= Liga Uruguaya de Básquetbol Finals MVP =

The Liga Uruguaya de Básquetbol Finals MVP (English: Uruguayan Basketball League Finals MVP) is the annual basketball award, that is given by the professional Uruguayan top-tier level Liga Uruguaya de Básquetbol (LUB) (Uruguayan Basketball League), to its Most Valuable Player of each league season's finals. The award began with the league's inaugural 2003 season. Diego Castrillón was the first award winner. Leandro García Morales has won the most awards so far, having won four.

== Winners ==
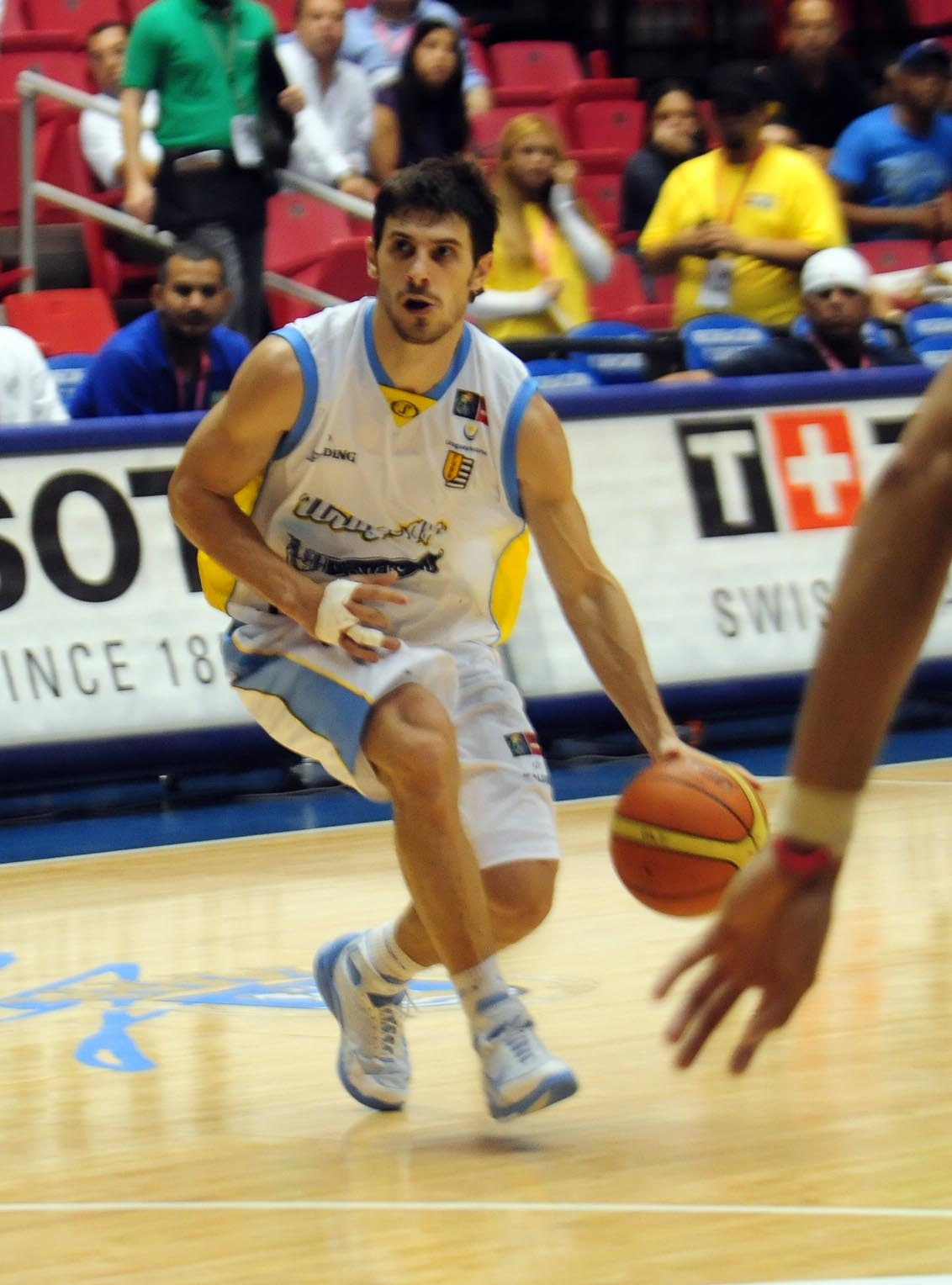
Leandro García Morales has won the Uruguayan League Finals MVP award four times (2008, 2009, 2013, 2017).

Season	Winner	Club	Ref.
2003	(Uruguay) Diego Castrillón	Defensor Sporting	
2004–05	(Uruguay) Luis Silveira	Salto Uruguay	
2005–06	(Uruguay) Marcel Bouzout	Trouville	
2006–07	(Uruguay) Fernando Martínez	Malvín	
2007–08	(Uruguay) Leandro García Morales	Biguá	
2008–09	(Uruguay) Leandro García Morales	Biguá	
2009–10	(United States) Robby Collum	Defensor Sporting	
2010–11	(Uruguay) Reque Newsome	Malvín	
2011–12	(Uruguay) Mauricio Aguiar	Hebraica y Macabi	
2012–13	(Uruguay) Leandro García Morales	Aguada	
2013–14	(Uruguay) Bruno Fitipaldo	Malvín	
2014–15	(Uruguay) Mathías Calfani	Malvín	
2015–16	(Uruguay) Luciano Parodi	Hebraica y Macabi	
2016–17	(Uruguay) Leandro García Morales	Hebraica y Macabi	
2017–18	(Uruguay) Nicolás Mazzarino	Malvín	
2018–19	(United States) Andrew Feeley	Aguada	
2019–20	(United States) Dwayne Davis	Aguada	
2021	(United States) Donald Sims	Biguá	
2021–22	(United States) Donald Sims	Biguá	
2022–23	(Uruguay) Luciano Parodi	Hebraica y Macabi	
2023–24	(United States) Donald Sims	Aguada	
2024–25	(Uruguay) Patricio Prieto	Nacional	
2025–26	(United States) Skyler Hogan	Peñarol	

== Multiple winners ==
Player	Finals MVPs	Years won
(Uruguay) Leandro García Morales	4	2008, 2009, 2013, 2017
(United States) Donald Sims	3	2021, 2022, 2024
(Uruguay) Luciano Parodi	2	2016, 2023

== See also ==
- Uruguayan Basketball League MVP
- Uruguayan Basketball League (2003–present)
- Uruguayan Federal Basketball Championship (1915–2003)
- Uruguayan Basketball Champions
- Uruguayan Basketball Federation (FUBB)
