= FUBB All-Star Game =

- Status: Inactive
- Frequency: Annually
- Inaugurated: 2012
- Most recent: 2014
- Organizer: Uruguayan Basketball Federation (FUBB)

The FUBB All-Star Game was an annual basketball event in Uruguay, organised by the Uruguayan Basketball Federation (Spanish: Federación Uruguaya de Basketball, FUBB) is the governing body of basketball in the country. It was established in 1998 as the All-Star Game of Uruguay's top tier. The event was held annually at the end of the year and consisted of an all-star game, a three-point shoot contest and slam-dunk exhibition.

Many notable players like Nicolás Mazzarino, Néstor Colmenares, Leandro García Morales, Bruno Fitipaldo, and Martín Osimani have played in the All-Star Game.

== Voting ==
In 2012, the selection made by the public was ten players per team, while the coaches picked the remaining two for aech squad. In 2013, the criteria for the election of Uruguayan and foreign players was again the popular vote carried out through an online poll for 12 players in total. The remaining players for each team were picked by the coaches and the FUBB.

== Editions ==
Bold: Team that won the game.

Year	Date/Location	Team	Score	Team	MVP	Club
2012	December 12, Montevideo	Uruguayans		Foreigners		
2013	December 13, Montevideo	Urruguayans	42-**61**	**Foreigners**	(Uruguay) Santiago Vidal Casaretto	Club Biguá
2014	December 10, Biguá	Uruguayans		Foreigners		

== Selections (2012-2014) ==
- All-Star Game 2012:

DATE: December 12
VENUE:Peñarol Palace, Montevideo
SCORE: Uruguayans - Foreigners

Uruguayans: Emiliano Giano (Nacional), Federico Bavosi (Unión Atlética), Leandro García Morales (Aguada), Juan Pablo Silveira (Olimpia), Emilio Taboada (Unión Atlética), Demian Álvarez (Sayago), Mathias Calfani (Malvín), Nicolás Borsellino (Malvín), Bruno Fitipaldo (Malvín), Panchi Barrera (Hebraica), Gonzalo Meira (Biguá) and Rodrigo Trelles (Bohemios). Coaches: Pablo López and Álvaro Tito.

Foreigners: Marcus Elliot (Olimpia), Walter Baxley (Defensor Sporting), Carlton Fay (Trouville), Anthony Danridge (Montevideo), Chris Jeffries (Biguá), Justin Keenan (Trouville), Terrence Shellman (Sayago), Hatila Passos (Hebraica), Anthony Johnson (Biguá), Timothy Jennings (Paysandú), Kristian Clarkson (Larre Borges). Coaches: Héctor Da Prá and Mateo Rubio (ESP).

- All-Star Game 2013:

DATE: December 13
VENUE:Peñarol Palace, Montevideo
SCORE: Uruguayans - Foreigners

Uruguayans: Bruno Fitipaldo (Malvín), Demian Álvarez (Goes), Federico Haller (Nacional), Fernando Martínez (Malvín), Panchi Barrera (Hebraica and Macabi), Leandro García Morales (Aguada), Mathías Calfani (Malvín), Nicolás Borselino (Hebraica and Macabi), Nicolás Mazzarino (Malvín), Ryan Blackson (Atenas), Santiago Vidal (Biguá) and Sebastián Izaguirre (DSC). Coaches: Javier Espíndola and Mateo Rubio.

Foreigners: Andrew Felley (Goes), Anthony Danridge (Montevideo), DeAngeo Riley (Nacional), Djibril Kante (Malvín), Erron Maxey (Unión Atlética), Greg Dilligard (Aguada), Hatila Passos (Hebraica and Macabi), Johwen Villegas (Atenas), Jon Rogers (Unión Atlética), Robby Collum (Defensor Sporting Club), Terrence Shelman (Sayago) and Weyinmi Rose (Hebraica and Macabi). Coaches: Gerardo Jauri and Pablo López.

- All-Star Game 2014:

DATE: December 10
VENUE:Gimnasio de Biguá, Biguá
SCORE: Uruguayans - Foreigners

Uruguayans: Martín Osimani (Aguada), Marcos Cabot (Defensor Sporting), Luciano Parodi (Hebraica y Macabi), Santiago Vidal (Trouville), Fernando Martínez (Malvín), Nicolás Mazzarino (Malvín), Joaquín Izuibejeres (Trouville), Juan Garbarino (Bohemios), Demian Álvarez (Larre Borges), Sebastián Vázquez (Goes), Sebastián Izaguirre (Hebraica y Macabi), Mathías Calfani (Malvín), Nicolás Borsellino (Aguada), Brian Craig (Bohemios), Kiril Wachsmann (Defensor Sporting), Reque Newsome (Malvín). Coaches: Pablo López (Malvín), Álvaro Tito (Trouville).

Foreigners: Michael Hicks (Hebraica y Macabi), Anthony Danridge (Defensor Sporting), Anthony Young (Montevideo), Eniel Polynice (Bohemios), Richard Chaney (Malvín), Johwen Villegas (Atenas), Alex Galindo (Olimpia), Chris Moss (Aguada-injured), Jimmy Boston (Larre Borges), Justin Dobbins (Defensor Sporting), Andrew Feeley (Biguá), Kristian Clarkson (Larre Borges), Néstor Colmenares (Trouville), Terrence Shelman (Sayago), Dwayne Curtis (Bohemios), Kevin Young (Trouville). Coaches: Gerardo Jauri (Defensor Sporting), Marcelo Signorelli (Hebraica y Macabi)

== All Star Game events ==
=== Three-Point Shoot Contest ===
Year	Player	Team
2012	(Uruguay) (Italy) Bruno Fitipaldo	Club Malvín
2013	(Uruguay) (Italy) Bruno Fitipaldo (2)	Club Malvín

=== Slam-Dunk champions ===
Year	Player	Team
2013	(United States) Anthony Danridge	Montevideo Basket

== Players with most selections ==
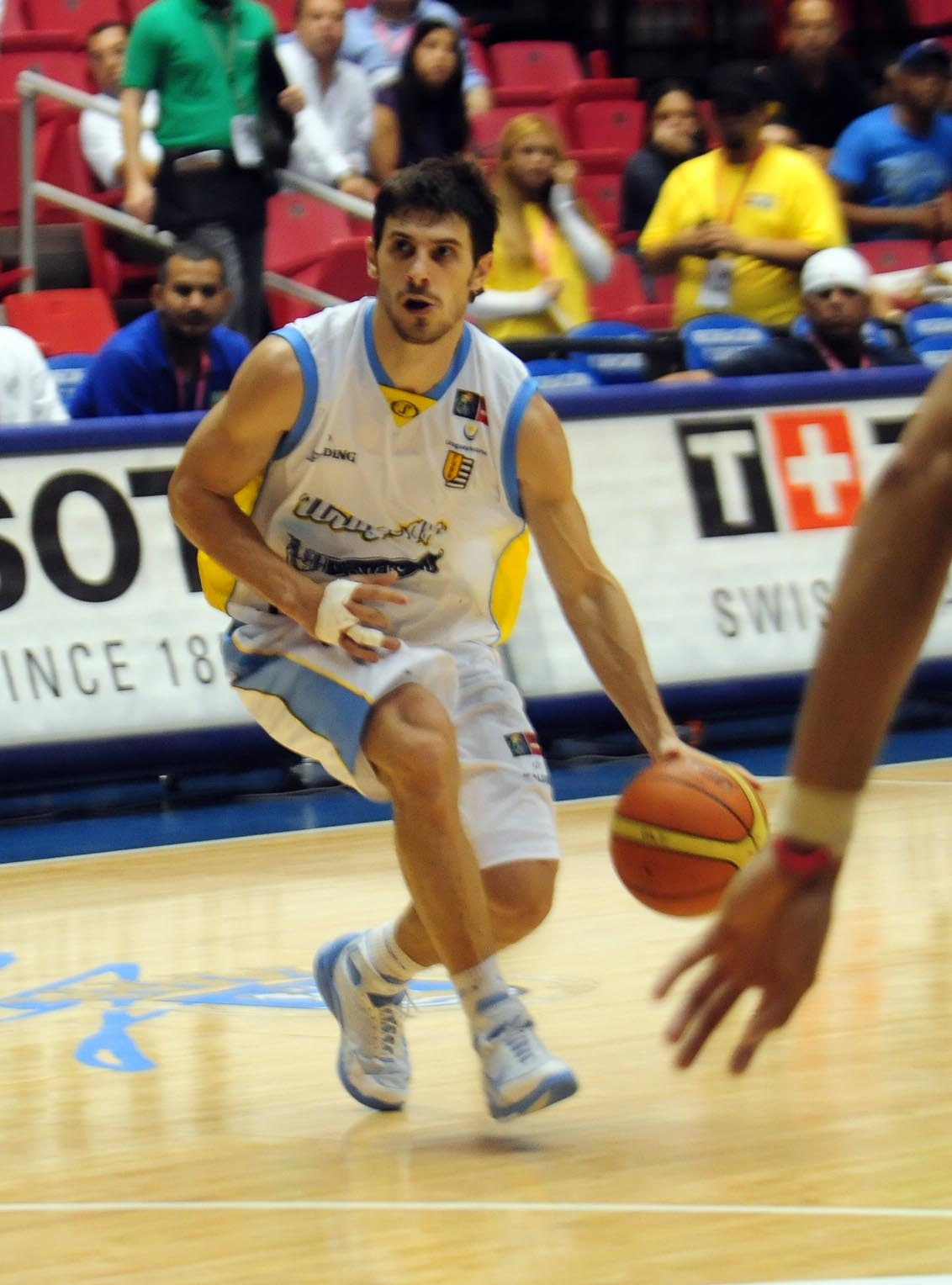
Former Uruguay international Leandro García Morales participated in three editions.

Player	All-Star	Editions	Notes
(Uruguay) Leandro García Morales	3	2012, 2013, 2014	
(Uruguay) Mathias Calfani	3	2012, 2013, 2014	
(Uruguay) Demian Álvarez	3	2012, 2013, 2014	
(United States) Anthony Danridge	3	2012, 2013, 2014	1x Slam dunk winner (2013)
(United States) Terrence Shelman	3	2012, 2013, 2014	

=== Other notable participants ===
- (Uruguay) (Italy) Bruno Fitipaldo
- (Uruguay) Martín Osimani
- (Uruguay) (Spain) Panchi Barrera
- (Uruguay) Nicolás Mazzarino
- (Uruguay) Mathías Calfani
- (Venezuela) Néstor Colmenares
- (United States) Eniel Polynice
- (United States) Justin Keenan
- (United States) Erron Maxey
- (United States) Djibril Kante
- (Puerto Rico) Alex Galindo

== See also ==
- Uruguayan Basketball Federation
