= Divisional Tercera de Ascenso =

Promotion basketball league in Uruguay

- Organising body: FUBB
- First season: 2003
- Country: Uruguay
- Confederation: FIBA Americas
- Number of teams: 13
- Level on pyramid: 3
- Promotion to: Liga de Ascenso
- Current champions: Sayago (1st title) (2025)
- Most championships: Olivol Mundial (3 titles)
- President: (Uruguay) Víctor Correa
- TV partners: Tenfield
- Website: www.fubb.org.uy
- 2026 DTA season

The Divisional Tercera de Ascenso (also known as DTA; English: Third Promotion Division) is the third division of professional club basketball league in Uruguay. It is organized by the Uruguayan Basketball Federation (FUBB). The competition began in 2003. The promotion basketball championships replaced the Third Promotion Federal Championship.

Sayago is the current champion and Olivol Mundial is the team with more titles, with three.

== Format ==
The DTA is currently played in three stages: Torneo Clasificatorio (Qualifying Tournament), Liguilla (Little League) or Reclasificatorio (Requalifier); and playoffs.

- In the Qualifying Tournament, the clubs play each other once, the first eight of the table play the playoffs.
- The teams competed in the playoffs, with series being best of three. The first stage is the quarterfinals. The qualifiers are played as: A) 1st vs. 8th, B) 2nd vs. 7th, C) 3rd vs 6th, D) 4th vs. 5th. The semifinal are also best of three series, and the pairings are: A) Winner vs. D) Winner and B) Winner vs. C) Winner. The winners of these matches are promoted to the Liga de Ascenso and play in a single-match final, with the winner being crowned as the champion. The loosers play a match, for the third promotion.

== Participating teams ==
=== 2026 season teams ===
Notes: All statistics are only for the DTA, which is organized by the Uruguayan Basketball Federation (Federación Uruguaya de Basketball). The Campeonato Federal de Tercera de Ascenso is not included. The "arena" column reflects the arena where the team plays most of its home games, but does not indicate that the team in question is the owner.

Club	City	Arena	Capacity	Foundation	Seasons	Promotions	Championships
25 de Agosto	Montevideo	Gimnasio 25 de Agosto (Note: Since these venues do not have an official name, they are mentioned as Gimnasio (Arena) "club name".)	350	1948	5	3	1
Ateneo	Piriápolis	Gimnasio Alfredo L. Núñez	750	1953	6	0	0
Auriblanco	Montevideo	Gimnasio Roberto Vázquez	350	1959	21	1	1
Bohemios	Montevideo	Gimnasio Albatros	925	1932	4	1	0
CADER	Rocha	Gimnasio Héctor Novick (Note: CADER decided to play its home games at the Montevideo's court.)	500	1937	2	0	0
Capitol	Montevideo	Gimnasio Carlos Garbuyo	480	1943	4	1	0
Capurro	Montevideo	Gimnasio Guillermo J. Ríos	150	1943	15	1	1
Defensores de Maroñas	Montevideo	Gimnasio Defensores de Maroñas	400	1934	5	0	0
Juventud	Las Piedras	Estadio Federal Cirilio Malnatti	1,000	1935	14	1	0
Layva	Montevideo	Gimnasio Layva	300	1924	7	0	0
Reducto	Montevideo	Gimnasio Reducto	600	1927	17	2	0
San Telmo Rápido Sport	Montevideo	Gimnasio Lussich Rolando	500	1949	20	1	0
Yale	Montevideo	Campo de Deportes Luis Ruocco	500	1940	8	1	0

== Champions by season ==
Season	Champion	Other promotions	Champion Coach
2003	Capurro	Reducto	(Uruguay) Sergio Hermida
2004	Hebraica y Macabi	Las Bóvedas	(Uruguay) Sergio Hermida
2005	Stockolmo	Larre Borges	(Uruguay) Alex Falero
2006	25 de Agosto	Juventud	(Uruguay) Gustavo Sande
2007	Guruyú Waston	Marne	(Uruguay) Miguel Bragunde
2008	Montevideo	Capitol	(Uruguay) Fernando Medina
2009	Guruyú Waston	Marne	(Uruguay) Gustavo Sande
2010	Urunday Universitario	Goes	(Uruguay) Daniel Lovera
2011	Romis Nelimar	Reducto	(Uruguay) Diego Frugoni
2011	Romis Nelimar	Marne	(Uruguay) Diego Frugoni
2012	Colón	Stockolmo	(Uruguay) Gustavo Reig
2012	Colón	25 de Agosto	(Uruguay) Gustavo Reig
2013	Olivol Mundial	Romis Nelimar	(Uruguay) Fernando Joanicó
2014	Cordón	Larrañaga	(Uruguay) Mathías Nieto
2015	Miramar	25 de Agosto	(Uruguay) Andrés Blazina
2016	Auriblanco	Colón	(Uruguay) Nicolás Rabino
2017	Olivol Mundial	Lagomar	(Uruguay) Javier Sánchez
2018	Peñarol	Danubio	(Uruguay) Diego Castrillón
2019	Olivol Mundial	Urupan	(Uruguay) Martín Sedes
2021	Larrañaga	San Telmo Rápido Sport	(Uruguay) Sergio Delgado
2022	Atenas	Welcome	(Uruguay) Martín Sedes
2023	Montevideo	Bohemios	(Uruguay) Sergio Delgado
2024	Atenas	Marne	(Uruguay) Guido Fernández
2024	Atenas	Yale	(Uruguay) Guido Fernández
2025	Sayago	Albatros	(Uruguay) Gustavo Reig
2025	Sayago	Olivol Mundial	(Uruguay) Gustavo Reig

== Total titles by club ==
Club	Championships	Promotions	Year(s) won
Olivol Mundial	3	4	2013, 2017, 2019
Atenas	2	2	2022, 2024
Montevideo	2	2	2008, 2023
Guruyú Waston	2	2	2007, 2009
25 de Agosto	1	3	2006
Larrañaga	1	2	2021
Colón	1	2	2012
Romis Nelimar	1	2	2011
Stockolmo	1	2	2005
Peñarol	1	1	2018
Auriblanco	1	1	2016
Miramar	1	1	2015
Cordón	1	1	2014
Urunday Universitario	1	1	2010
Hebraica y Macabi	1	1	2004
Capurro	1	1	2003
Sayago	1	1	2025
Marne	0	4	
Reducto	0	2	
Albatros	0	1	
Yale	0	1	
Bohemios	0	1	
Welcome	0	1	
San Telmo Rápido Sport	0	1	
Urupan	0	1	
Danubio	0	1	
Lagomar	0	1	
Goes	0	1	
Capitol	0	1	
Juventud	0	1	
Larre Borges	0	1	
Las Bóvedas	0	1	

== See also ==
- Liga Uruguaya de Básquetbol
- Liga de Ascenso
- Uruguayan Basketball Federation (FUBB)
