= 2021–22 LUB season =

- League: Liga Uruguaya de Básquetbol
- Sport: Basketball
- Duration: 25 October 2021 – 13 June 2022
- Number of teams: 13

Regular season
- Top seed: Goes
- Season MVP: Luis Santos (Biguá)
- Top scorer: Davaunta Thomas (Capitol)

Playoffs
- Finals champions: Biguá (4th title)
- Runners-up: Peñarol
- Finals MVP: Donald Sims (Biguá)

Seasons
- ← 2020–21 2022–23 →

The 2021–22 LUB season was the 19th season of the Liga Uruguaya de Básquetbol (LUB), the highest level basketball league in Uruguay.

The number of teams was expanded to 14 teams this season.

Biguá won their fourth LUB championship, Donald Sims was named the Finals MVP.

== Teams ==
=== Changes ===
▲ Promoted from 2019–20 Liga Ouro	▼ Relegated from the 2020–21 LUB season
Urupan; Olivol Mundial	N/A

=== Arenas ===
Team	City	Arena	Capacity
Aguada	Montevideo	Gimnasio Aguada	1,635
Biguá	Montevideo	Gimnasio Biguá de Villa Biarritz	1,200
Capitol	Montevideo	''Gimnasio Carlos Garbuyo''	480
Defensor Sporting	Montevideo	''Gimnasio Óscar Magurno''	800
Hebraica Macabi	Montevideo	Gimnasio Tabaré	1,100
Goes	Montevideo	''Gimnasio Plaza de las Misiones''	1,800
Malvín	Montevideo	''Gimnasio Juan Francisco Canil''	900
Nacional	Montevideo	Gimnasio Unión Atlética	750
Olimpia	Montevideo	''Gimnasio Albérico Passadore''	1200
Olivol Mundial	Montevideo	Gimnasio Olivol Mundial	350
Peñarol	Montevideo	Palacio Cr. Gastón Güelfi	4,700
Trouville	Montevideo	Gimnasio Club Trouville	780
Urunday Universitario	Montevideo	Gimnasio Urunday Universitario	700
Urupan	Pando	''Gimnasio Santiago A. Cigliuti''	1000

== Regular season ==
Quarterfinals
Play-in games
Relegation

Pos	2021–22 LUB regular season							
Pos	Team	Pld	W	L	PF	PA	PD	Pts
1	Goes	26	22	4	2088	1833	+255	48
2	Biguá	26	22	4	2334	2151	+183	48
3	Urupan	26	17	9	2248	2148	+100	43
4	Peñarol	26	17	9	1982	1895	+87	43
5	Malvín	26	15	11	2102	2110	-8	41
6	Trouville	26	13	13	2230	2206	+24	39
7	Olimpia	26	12	14	2140	2206	+25	38
8	Aguada	26	16	10	2089	2009	+80	38*
9	Nacional	26	11	15	2162	2157	+5	37
10	Defensor Sporting	26	10	16	1985	2051	-66	36
11	Hebraica y Macabi	26	9	17	2152	2226	-74	35
12	Urunday Universitario	26	8	18	2051	2226	-175	34
13	Olivol Mundial (R)	26	8	18	1996	2114	-118	34
14	Capitol (R)	26	2	24	2036	2354	-318	28

Source: NBB; (R): Relegated.

== Playoffs ==
The highest placed teams in the play-in series (denoted with a * next to their name) began the series with a 1–0 advantage.

Play-In
8	Aguada *	3
9	Nacional	2
5	Malvín *	3
12	Urunday Universitario	1
7	Olimpia *	3
10	Defensor Sporting	1
6	Trouville *	3
11	Hebraica y Macabi	0

Quarterfinals
1	Goes	2
8	Aguada	3
4	Peñarol	3
5	Malvín	2
2	Biguá	3
7	Olimpia	2
3	Urupan	2
6	Trouville	3

Semifinals
8	Aguada	0
4	Peñarol	3
2	Biguá	3
6	Trouville	0

Finals
4	Peñarol	1
2	Biguá	4

== Statistics ==
=== Individual statistical leaders ===
After the regular season.

Category	Player	Team(s)	Statistic
Points per game	Devaunta Thomas	Capitol	22.8
Rebounds per game	Hatila Passos	Defensor Sporting	12.0
Assists per game	Santiago Vidal	Bigua	8.2
Steals per game	Mateo Sarni	Urupan	2.5
Blocks per game	Luis Santos	Bigua	1.8
