= 2012 South American Basketball Championship =

45th South American Basketball Championship

Tournament details
- Host country: Argentina
- City: Resistencia
- Dates: 18–22 June
- Teams: 8 (from 1 confederation)
- Venue: 1 (in 1 host city)

Final positions
- Champions: Argentina (13th title)
- Runners-up: Venezuela
- Third place: Uruguay

Tournament statistics
- MVP: Leonardo Gutiérrez

Official website
- www.fiba.basketball/history

The 2012 South American Basketball Championship was the 45th edition of the South American Basketball Championship. Eight teams participated in the competition, held in Resistencia, Chaco Province, Argentina, from 18 to 22 June 2012 at the Stadium of Club Atlético Sarmiento. Brazil were the defending champions. The top five teams qualified for the 2013 FIBA Americas Championship, which also served as the FIBA Americas' qualifier for the 2014 Basketball World Cup.

== Preliminary round ==
All times are local (UTC−3).

=== Group A ===
Pos	Team	Pld	W	L	PF	PA	PD	Pts	Qualification
1	Argentina	3	3	0	265	219	+46	6	Semifinals
2	Venezuela	3	2	1	274	217	+57	5	Semifinals
3	Chile	3	1	2	201	240	−39	4	5th place match
4	Colombia	3	0	3	200	264	−64	3	

Source: FIBA

June 18
14:00

Report

Venezuela	86–61	Chile
Scoring by quarter: 20–17, 25–10, 21–23, 20–11
Pts: Romero 17; Rebs: G. Vásquez 6 Asts: G. Vásquez 5		Pts: Carrasco 16; Rebs: Arteaga, Isla 4 Asts: Carrasco 3

June 18
22:00

Report

Colombia	68–87	Argentina
Scoring by quarter: 17–20, 19–26, 11–23, 21–18
Pts: Ortiz 17; Rebs: Pérez 9 Asts: Aragón 4		Pts: Campazzo 20; Rebs: J. Gutiérrez, Mata 6 Asts: Fernández, Laprovíttola 6

June 19
14:30

Report

Chile	76–66	Colombia
Scoring by quarter: 19–15, 20–11, 19–17, 18–23
Pts: Carrasco 17; Rebs: Isla 12; Asts: Carrasco 5		Pts: Guevara 18; Rebs: Guevara 14; Asts: Bacci, Ortiz 2

June 19
22:00

Report

Argentina	90–87	Venezuela
Scoring by quarter: 21–26, 23–22, 20–14, 26–25
Pts: L. Gutiérrez 18; Rebs: Mata 7 Asts: Laprovíttola 6		Pts: G. Vásquez 26; Rebs: J. Vargas 5 Asts: G. Vargas, G. Vásquez 3

June 20
14:30

Report

Colombia	66–101	Venezuela
Scoring by quarter: 10–31, 21–24, 24–25, 11–21
Pts: Pérez 21; Rebs: Pérez 8 Asts: Contreras 3		Pts: J. Vargas 14; Rebs: Echenique 9 Asts: G. Vásquez, Zamora 5

June 20
19:30

Report

Argentina	88–64	Chile
Scoring by quarter: 24–15, 24–14, 19–17, 21–18
Pts: J. Gutiérrez 26; Rebs: Delía 10; Asts: Laprovíttola 6		Pts: Arteaga 17; Rebs: Carrasco 7 Asts: Sepúlveda 4

=== Group B ===
Pos	Team	Pld	W	L	PF	PA	PD	Pts	Qualification
1	Brazil	3	3	0	239	182	+57	6	Semifinals
2	Uruguay	3	2	1	277	183	+94	5	Semifinals
3	Paraguay	3	1	2	214	211	+3	4	5th place match
4	Bolivia	3	0	3	144	298	−154	3	

Source: FIBA

June 18
16:15

Report

Uruguay	122–36	Bolivia
Scoring by quarter: 36–5, 23–11, 35–10, 28–10
Pts: Fitipaldo 20; Rebs: Calfani 8 Asts: Osimani 6		Pts: Mendoza 12; Rebs: Camargo 6 Asts: three players 2

June 18
18:30

Report

Paraguay	63–67	Brazil
Scoring by quarter: 15–15, 18–17, 15–23, 15–12
Pts: Araujo 20; Rebs: Zanotti 7 Asts: Pérez, Martínez 5		Pts: Benite 21; Rebs: Lima 9 Asts: dos Santos 4

June 19
17:00

Report

Bolivia	62–81	Paraguay
Scoring by quarter: 17–15, 12–34, 17–21, 16–11
Pts: Camargo 16; Rebs: Camargo 8 Asts: Mendoza 4		Pts: Mellone 15; Rebs: Fabio 9 Asts: Pérez 4

June 19
19:30

Report

Brazil	77–73	Uruguay
Scoring by quarter: 16–11, 16–15, 25–17, 20–30
Pts: dos Santos 23; Rebs: Felício 7 Asts: Benite, Belchior 3		Pts: García Morales 21; Rebs: Aguiar 6 Asts: Barrera 4

June 20
17:00

Report

Brazil	95–46	Bolivia
Scoring by quarter: 24–7, 25–11, 27–14, 19–14
Pts: Benite, Reis 17; Rebs: Reis 9 Asts: Corazza Neto 6		Pts: Cadario 20; Rebs: Camargo 6 Asts: Camargo 3

June 20
22:00

Report

Paraguay	70–82	Uruguay
Scoring by quarter: 9–22, 19–26, 21–19, 21–15
Pts: Araujo 23; Rebs: Araujo, Fabio 6 Asts: Martínez 3		Pts: Izaguirre 19; Rebs: Granger 10; Asts: Granger 6

== Knockout round ==
=== Bracket ===
Semifinals
June 21 – Resistencia
Brazil	70
Venezuela	86
June 21 – Resistencia
Argentina	88
Uruguay	81

Final
June 22 – Resistencia
Venezuela	56
Argentina	79
Third place match
June 22 – Resistencia
Brazil	68
Uruguay	80

Fifth place match
June 21 – Resistencia
Chile	88
Paraguay	93

=== Fifth place match ===
June 21
17:00

Report

Chile	88–93	Paraguay
Scoring by quarter: 21–18, 24–22, 23–23, 20–30
Pts: Arteaga 27; Rebs: Bravo, Isla 6 Asts: Carrasco 7		Pts: Araujo 22; Rebs: Ortiz 10; Asts: Martínez 9

=== Semifinals ===
June 21
19:30

Report

Brazil	70–86	Venezuela
Scoring by quarter: 15–20, 18–19, 17–26, 20–21
Pts: Benite 20; Rebs: Souza 12; Asts: dos Santos 6		Pts: Cubillan, Sucre 21; Rebs: three players 5 Asts: G. Vásquez 8

June 21
22:00

Report

Argentina	88–81	Uruguay
Scoring by quarter: 26–18, 22–19, 20–16, 20–28
Pts: L. Gutiérrez 18; Rebs: Mata 10; Asts: L. Gutiérrez 4		Pts: Granger 26; Rebs: Granger 9 Asts: García Morales 4

=== Third place match ===
June 22
19:30

Report

Uruguay	80–68	Brazil
Scoring by quarter: 18–17, 17–18, 19–7, 26–26
Pts: Aguiar 21; Rebs: Izaguirre 7 Asts: Osimani 3		Pts: Benite 18; Rebs: Lima 6 Asts: dos Santos 7

=== Final ===
June 22
22:00

Report

Venezuela	56–79	Argentina
Scoring by quarter: 16–18, 9–20, 14–20, 17–21
Pts: Romero 12; Rebs: G. Vargas, J. Vargas 5 Asts: G. Vásquez 3		Pts: Campazzo 15; Rebs: Mata 7 Asts: Laprovíttola 6

== Final standings ==
Rank	Team	Record
1st place, gold medalist(s)	Argentina	5–0
2nd place, silver medalist(s)	Venezuela	3–2
3rd place, bronze medalist(s)	Uruguay	3–2
4th	Brazil	3–2
5th	Paraguay	2–2
6th	Chile	1–3
7th	Bolivia	0–3
7th	Colombia	0–3

Qualified for the 2013 FIBA Americas Championship
