= Diego Castrillón =

Uruguayan basketball player

Diego Ernesto Castrillón Martinez (born 8 January 1975, in Montevideo) is a former Uruguayan professional basketball player, coach and basketball teacher in Colegio Seminario. During his playing career, at a height of 2.00 m (6'6 3/4") tall, he played at the small forward and power forward positions. He was the Uruguayan League MVP and Uruguayan League Finals MVP, in 2003.

== Professional career ==
During his pro club career, Castrillón played in the Uruguayan League, with Club Malvín (1992–1996), Cordón (1997–1998), and with Defensor Sporting, from 1999, until his retirement in 2014. He won the Uruguayan League championship in 2003 (two tournaments), and in 2010, winning all three titles with Defensor Sporting. He was also an Uruguayan League runner-up in 1997 and 1998, with Cordón, losing both times against Welcome. He was also an Uruguayan League runner-up with Defensor Sporting in 2009, losing against Biguá, in 2013, losing against Aguada, and in 2014, losing against Club Malvín.

With Defensor Sporting, he played in the FIBA South American League, in the 2009 and 2013 seasons. With Defensor, he also played in the FIBA Americas League, in the 2007–08 and 2010–11 seasons.

== National team career ==
Castrillón was a member of Uruguay's junior national teams. He played with their Under-16 junior national team in 1991, and with their Under-22 junior national team in 1996.

Castrillón became a member of the senior Uruguay national team in 1999. With Uruguay, he played at the 1999 FIBA South American Championship, in Bahia Blanca, Argentina. He also played at the 2001 FIBA South American Championship in Valdivia, Chile, and in the 2006 FIBA South American Championship, in Caracas, Venezuela, where he won a silver medal. He was also the captain of the Uruguay national team at that tournament.

He also played at the 2008 FIBA South American Championship, in Puerto Montt, Chile, where he won a silver medal. Castrillon also played at the 1999 FIBA AmeriCup, with Uruguay, in San Juan, Puerto Rico, at the 2001 FIBA AmeriCup, in Neuquen, Argentina, and at the 2005 FIBA AmeriCup, in Santo Domingo, Dominican Republic. The 2008 FIBA South American Championship was his last tournament with Uruguay's senior national team.

== Coaching career ==
In 2010, Castrillón started coaching the juniors youth team of Defensor Sporting. First with their Under-13 team, from 2010 until 2012. In 2013, he coached their Under-15 team, and in 2014, he began coaching their Under-18 and Under-20 teams.

In 2015, he coached Club Nacional in the Uruguayan Second Division. In August 2018, he started coaching Club Atlético Peñarol, in the Uruguayan Third Division. His team, Club Atlético Peñarol won the title with a record of 15-0, finished unbeaten. In June 2019, he started the Uruguayan Second Division with Club Atlético Peñarol, until he finished as Peñarol's coach on 24 August 2019, when in the Uruguayan Second Division his team lost against Unión Atlética with a result of 78-73.
