= Uruguayan Basketball Championship =

The Uruguayan Basketball Championship is the season by season national club championship of the top-tier level men's professional basketball competition in Uruguay.

== History ==
- Campeonato Uruguayo Federal de Básquetbol (Uruguayan Federal Basketball Championship): (1915–2003)
- Liga Uruguaya de Básquetbol (Uruguayan Basketball League) (2003–present)

== List of first division champions (Uruguayan Federal Basketball Championship) ==
Campeonato 1a. División (Division 1a. Championship)
Season	Champion
1915	ACJ (YMCA)
1916	Plaza N° 3
1917	A. U. de S.
1918*	Sporting
Campeonato Nacional (National Championship)
1918*	Atenas
1919	Atenas
1920	Atenas
1921	Atenas
1922	Sporting
1923	Olimpia
1924	Sporting
1925	Unión Atlética
1926	Sporting
Campeonato Federal (Federal Championship)
1927	Sporting
1928	Olimpia
1929	Olimpia
1930	Sporting
1931	Atenas
1932	Sporting
1933	Sporting
1934	Sporting
1935	Nacional
1936	Sporting
1937	Nacional
1938	Sporting
1939	Goes
1940	Aguada
1941	Aguada
1942	Aguada
1943	Aguada
1944	Peñarol
1945	Trouville
1946	Olimpia
1947	Goes
1948	Aguada
1949	Sporting
1950	Sporting
1951	Sporting
1952	Peñarol
1953	Welcome
1954	Stockolmo
1955	Sporting
1956	Welcome
1957	Welcome
1958	Goes
1959	Goes
1960	Tabaré
1961	Tabaré
1962	Tabaré
1963	Bohemios
1964	Tabaré
1965	Olimpia
1966	Welcome
1967	Welcome
1968	Tabaré
1969	Atenas
1970	Olimpia
1971	Olimpia
1972	Olimpia
1973	Peñarol
1974	Aguada
1975	Hebraica Macabi
1976	Aguada
1977	Hebraica Macabi
1978	Peñarol
1979	Peñarol
1980	Sporting
1981	Bohemios
1982	Peñarol
1983	Bohemios
1984	Bohemios
1985	Sporting
1986	Cordón
1987	Bohemios
1988	Biguá
1989	Biguá
1990	Biguá
1991	Cordón
1992	Cordón
1993	Cordón
1994	Hebraica Macabi
1995	Cordón
1996	Cordón
1997	Welcome
1998	Welcome
1999	Welcome
2000	Welcome
2001	Cordón
2002	Cordón
2003	Defensor Sporting

- There were two tournaments held in 1918.

=== Titles by club (Uruguayan Federal Basketball Championship) ===
Campeonato Federal (Federal Championship)
Club	Championships won	Years won
Defensor Sporting	18	1918, 1922, 1924, 1926, 1927, 1930, 1932, 1933, 1934, 1936, 1938, 1949, 1950, 1951, 1955, 1980, 1985, 2003
Welcome	9	1953, 1956, 1957, 1966, 1967, 1997, 1998, 1999, 2000
Cordón	8	1986, 1991, 1992, 1993, 1995, 1996, 2001, 2002
Olimpia	8	1923, 1928, 1929, 1946, 1965, 1970, 1971, 1972
Aguada	7	1940, 1941, 1942, 1943, 1948, 1974, 1976
Atenas	6	1918, 1919, 1920, 1921, 1931, 1969
Peñarol	6	1944, 1952, 1973, 1978, 1979, 1982
Bohemios	5	1963, 1981, 1983, 1984, 1987
Tabaré	5	1960, 1961, 1962, 1964, 1968
Goes	4	1939, 1947, 1958, 1959
Biguá	3	1988, 1989, 1990
Hebraica Macabi	3	1975, 1977, 1994
Nacional	2	1935, 1937
Trouville	1	1945
Stockolmo	1	1954
Unión Atlética	1	1925
ACJ (YMCA)	1	1915
Plaza Nº 3	1	1916
A. U. de S.	1	1917

== List of first division champions (Uruguayan Basketball League) ==
Liga Uruguaya de Básquetbol (Uruguayan Basketball League)
Season	Champion
2003	Defensor Sporting
2004–05	Salto Uruguay
2005–06	Trouville
2006–07	Malvín
2007–08	Biguá
2008–09	Biguá
2009–10	Defensor Sporting
2010–11	Malvín
2011–12	Hebraica Macabi
2012–13	Aguada
2013–14	Malvín
2014–15	Malvín
2015–16	Hebraica Macabi
2016–17	Hebraica Macabi
2017–18	Malvín
2018–19	Aguada
2019–20	Aguada
2021	Biguá
2021–22	Biguá
2022–23	Hebraica Macabi
2023–24	Aguada
2024–25	Nacional
2025–26	Peñarol

=== Titles by club (Uruguayan Basketball League) ===
Liga Uruguaya de Básquetbol (Uruguayan Basketball League)
Club	Championships	Years won
Malvín	5	2007, 2011, 2014, 2015, 2018
Aguada	4	2013, 2019, 2020, 2024
Hebraica Macabi	4	2012, 2016, 2017, 2023
Biguá	4	2008, 2009, 2021, 2022
Defensor Sporting	2	2003, 2010
Peñarol	1	2026
Nacional	1	2025
Trouville	1	2006
Salto Uruguay	1	2005

== Total First Division titles by club ==
Club	Number of titles won	Years won
Defensor Sporting	20	1918, 1922, 1924, 1926, 1927, 1930, 1932, 1933, 1934, 1936, 1938, 1949, 1950, 1951, 1955, 1980, 1985, 2003, 2003, 2010
Aguada	11	1940, 1941, 1942, 1943, 1948, 1974, 1976, 2013, 2019, 2020, 2024
Welcome	9	1953, 1956, 1957, 1966, 1967, 1997, 1998, 1999, 2000
Cordón	8	1986, 1991, 1992, 1993, 1995, 1996, 2001, 2002
Olimpia	8	1923, 1928, 1929, 1946, 1965, 1970, 1971, 1972
Peñarol	7	1944, 1952, 1973, 1978, 1979, 1982, 2026
Hebraica y Macabi	7	1975, 1977, 1994, 2012, 2016, 2017, 2023
Biguá	7	1988, 1989, 1990, 2008, 2009, 2021, 2022
Atenas	6	1918, 1919, 1920, 1921, 1931, 1969
Malvín	5	2007, 2011, 2014, 2015, 2018
Bohemios	5	1963, 1981, 1983, 1984, 1987
Tabaré	5	1960, 1961, 1962, 1964, 1968
Goes	4	1939, 1947, 1958, 1959
Nacional	3	1935, 1937, 2025
Trouville	2	1945, 2006
Salto Uruguay	1	2005
Stockolmo	1	1954
Unión Atlética	1	1925
A. U. de S.	1	1917
Plaza Nº 3	1	1916
Asociación Cristiana de Jóvenes (ACJ) (YMCA)	1	1915

== See also ==
- Uruguayan Federal Basketball Championship (1915–2003)
- Uruguayan Basketball League (2003–present)
- Uruguayan Basketball Federation (FUBB)
