= Nicolás Mazzarino =

Uruguayan basketball player and coach (born 1975)

Biguá
- Position: Assistant coach
- League: Uruguayan Basketball League

Personal information
- Born: October 21, 1975 (age 51) Salto, Uruguay
- Listed height: 6 ft 0 in (1.83 m)
- Listed weight: 195 lb (88 kg)

Career information
- Playing career: 1991–2020

Career history
- 1991–1996: Hebraica y Macabi
- 1997–2001: Welcome
- 2001: Boca Juniors
- 2001–2002: Welcome
- 2002–2005: Viola Reggio Calabria
- 2005–2013: Mapooro Cantù
- 2013–2020: Malvín

Career highlights
- Italian Supercup winner (2012); Italian All Star Game 3 Point Shootout Champion (2011); FIBA South American Championship Top Scorer (2004); 8× Uruguayan League champion (1994, 1997, 1998, 1999, 2000, 2014, 2015, 2018); Uruguayan League Finals MVP (2018)
Medals
Men's basketball
Representing Uruguay
Pan American Games
| Bronze medal – third place | 2007 Rio de Janeiro |
FIBA South American Championship
| Gold medal – first place | 1997 Maracaibo |
| Silver medal – second place | 2008 Puerto Montt |

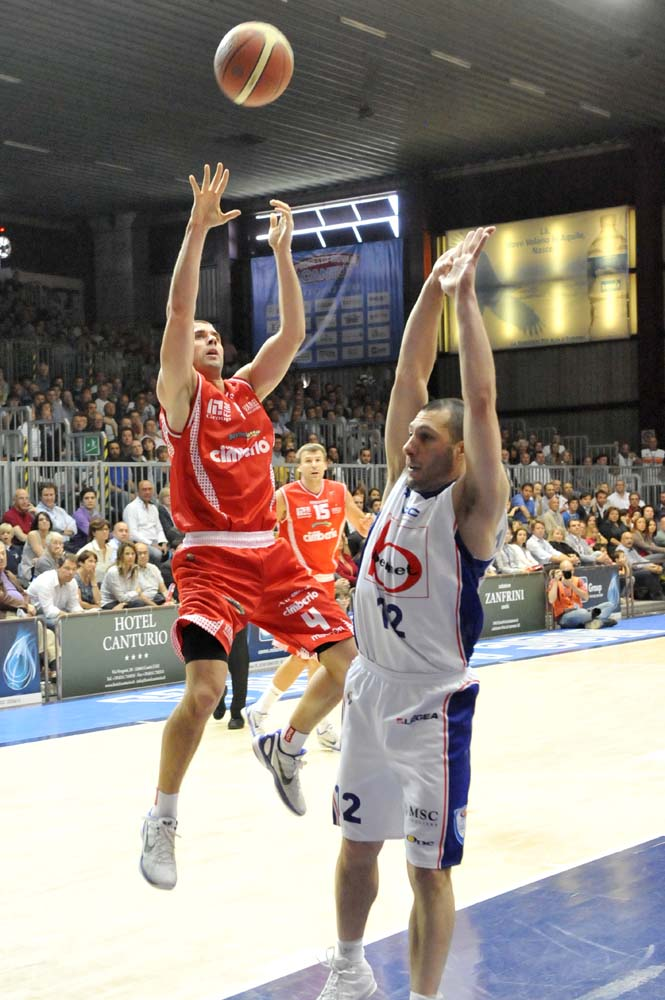
Basketball players Demartini and Mazzarino.

Nicolás Mazzarino (born October 21, 1975) is a former Uruguayan professional basketball player, and current assistant coach for Club Biguá de Villa Biarritz of the Liga Uruguaya de Básquetbol. He also holds an Italian passport. At a height of 1.83 m (6 ft 0 in) tall, he played the point guard and shooting guard positions.

== Professional career ==
Mazzarino began his professional career in the Uruguayan club Hebraica y Macabi in 1991. In this club, Mazzarino won the Uruguayan Federal Championship title in 1994. In 1997, he moved to C.A. Welcome, another Uruguayan basketball team, where he won 4 consecutive Uruguayan Federal Championships. In 2001, Mazzarino played a brief time in the Argentinian League team C.A. Boca Juniors, but then he returned to C.A. Welcome.

In 2001, he moved to the Italian League, to play in Viola Reggio Calabria, where he became the team's captain and best scorer in the 2004–05 season.

After that season, he moved to Pallacanestro Cantù. In the 2007–08 season, he became the captain of Cantù. His best season with Cantù was the 2009–10 season, when he helped Cantù make it to the Italian League semifinals, after averaging 13.8 points and 2.8 assists per game.

In 2013, he returned to Uruguay, and began playing at Club Malvín. With the team, he won the Uruguayan Basketball League championship in 2014, 2015, and 2018.

== National team career ==
Mazzarino played with the senior Uruguayan national team from 1997 to 2014. He played with Uruguay at 6 FIBA South American Championships (1997, 1999, 2001, 2004, 2008, 2014), 6 FIBA AmeriCups (1997, 1999, 2001, 2003, 2005, 2007, 2013), and 3 Pan American Games (1999, 2003, and 2007).
