= Panchi Barrera =

Uruguayan-Spanish basketball player

Club Atlético Olimpia
- Position: Point guard
- League: Liga Uruguaya de Basketball

Personal information
- Born: April 6, 1985 (age 41)
- Listed height: 6 ft 4 in (1.93 m)
- Listed weight: 205 lb (93 kg)

Career information
- Playing career: 2004–present

Career history
- 2004–2007: DKV Joventut
- 2005: → Pamesa Castellón (loan)
- 2005–2006: → CB Ciudad de Huelva (loan)
- 2006–2007: → CB Breogán (loan)
- 2007: → Club Melilla Baloncesto (loan)
- 2007–2008: Hebraica y Macabi
- 2008–2009: Atenas de Córdoba
- 2009: Trotamundos de Carabobo
- 2009–2010: Unión Atlética
- 2010–2011: Unicaja Málaga
- 2011: CB Granada
- 2011–2013: Hebraica y Macabi
- 2013: Guaiqueríes de Margarita
- 2013–2015: Hebraica y Macabi
- 2015–2016: Welcome
- 2016–2017: Aguada
- 2017–2018: Gimnasia y Esgrima
- 2019: Astros de Jalisco
- 2019–2020: Flamengo
- 2020–2021: Peñarol
- 2022: Defensor Sporting
- 2023–present: Club Atlético Olimpia

Career highlights
- Uruguayan League MVP (2010)
Medals
Men's basketball
Representing Uruguay
Pan American Games
Bronze medal – third place	2007 Rio de Janeiro
FIBA South American Championship
Silver medal – second place	2008 Puerto Montt

Gustavo Javier Barrera Castro, commonly known as Panchi Barrera (born April 6, 1985) is an Uruguayan-Spanish professional basketball player. His jersey's number is 9. He is a longtime member of the Uruguay national basketball team and is currently playing professionally with Club Atlético Olimpia of Liga Uruguaya de Basketball.

== Professional career ==
Barrera started his professional career in 2001 with Welcome Montevideo in Uruguay. He played several years with DKV Joventut in Spain, including six games with the team at the ULEB Cup 2003-04. After several years on the bench, he had his best season back in Uruguay in 2007-08 for second place Hebraica y Macabi, averaging 14.1 points and 6.9 assists per game.

Following this season, he was invited to play on the Houston Rockets' summer league team over the 2008 summer. After that he played a season with Club Atlético Atenas, he averaged 36.7 minutes per game, 17.0 points per game, 4.0 rebounds per game and 9.0 assists per game. He played for Trotamundos de Carabobo of the Venezuelan Professional Basketball League. At the moment he has got the highest number of assists per game at the Liga Uruguaya de Basketball averaging 7.0 assists per game, a total of 300 in the league.

== National team career ==
Barrera made his debut for the Uruguay senior team at the 2008 South American Championship, averaging 10.5 points and 5.2 assists per game. He also played for the team at the FIBA Americas Championship 2009.
