= Mathías Calfani =

Uruguayan basketball player (born 1992)

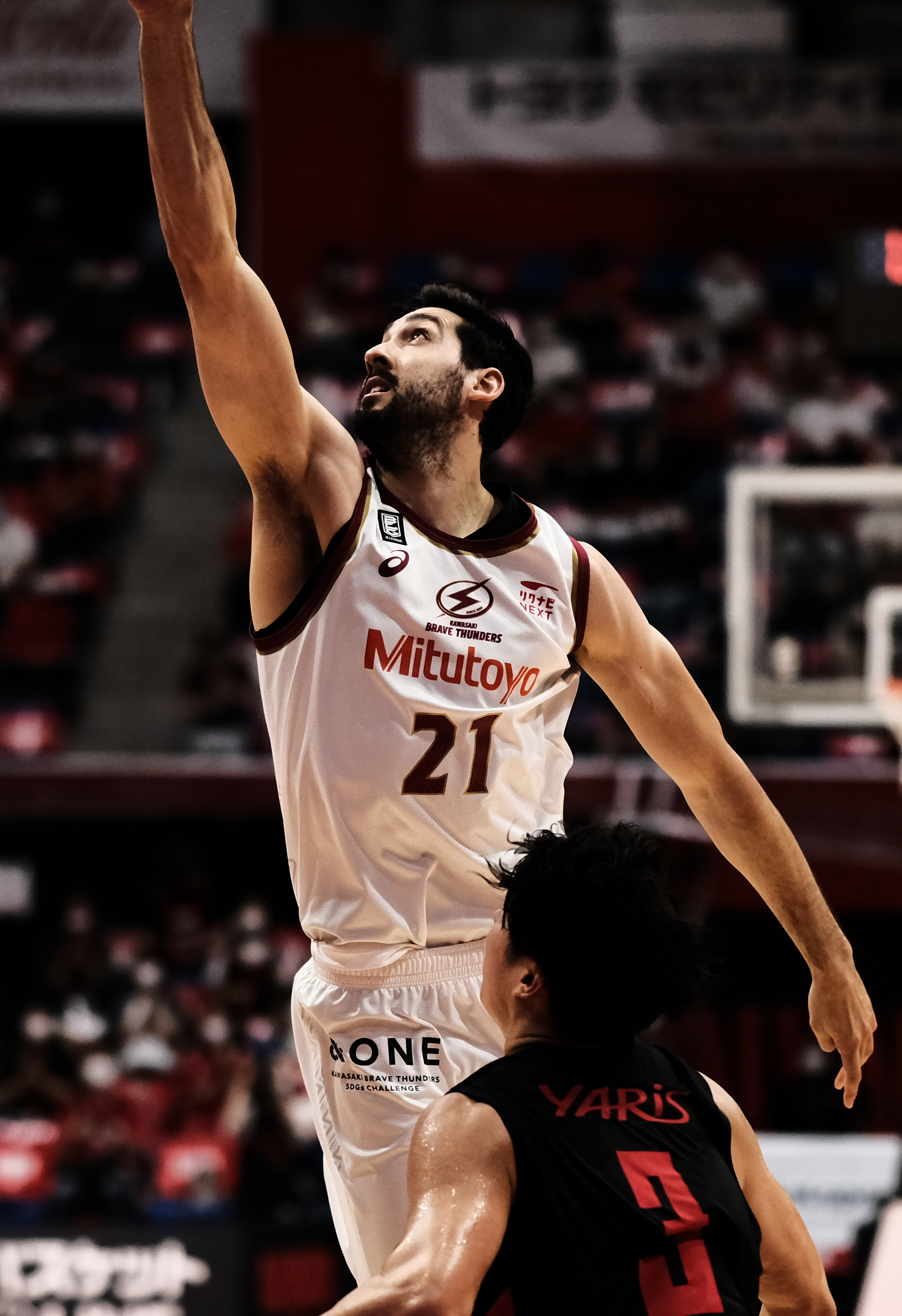

No. 21 – Obras Sanitarias
- Position: Power forward / center

Personal information
- Born: January 21, 1992 (age 34) Artigas, Uruguay
- Listed height: 6 ft 8.5 in (2.04 m)
- Listed weight: 218 lb (99 kg)

Career information
- NBA draft: 2014: undrafted
- Playing career: 2006–2025

Career history
- 2006–2012: Biguá
- 2011: Tabaré
- 2011–2012: Biguá
- 2012–2016: Malvín
- 2016–2019: San Lorenzo
- 2019–2021: Kawasaki Brave Thunders
- 2021–2022: Club Atlético Aguada
- 2022–2025: Obras Sanitarias

Career highlights
- FIBA Americas League champion (2018); South American Club Championship champion (2008); 2× Argentine League champion (2017, 2018); 4× Uruguayan League champion (2008, 2009, 2014, 2015); Uruguayan League MVP (2015); Uruguayan League Finals MVP (2015); Uruguayan 2nd Division champion (2011)
Medals
Men's basketball
Representing Uruguay
FIBA South American Championship
Bronze medal – third place	2010 Colombia
Bronze medal – third place	2012 Argentina
Bronze medal – third place	2016 Venezuela

Mathías Calfani (born January 21, 1992) is a Uruguayan former professional basketball player. Standing at 2.04 m (6' 8 1/2)" tall, he plays at the power forward and center positions.

== Professional career ==
In his pro club career, Calfani has played in both the South American 2nd-tier level FIBA South American League, and the South American 1st-tier level FIBA Americas League.

In 2019, he signed with Kawasaki Brave Thunders. Calfani averaged 10 points, 5 rebounds, 2 assist and 2 steals per game, shooting 57% from the field. He re-signed with the team on June 21, 2020.

== National team career ==
Calfani is a member of the senior Uruguayan national basketball team. He won the bronze medal at the 2010 FIBA South American Championship, 2012 FIBA South American Championship, and 2016 FIBA South American Championships.

== Awards and accomplishments ==
- 2010 FIBA South American Championship: Bronze
- 2012 FIBA South American Championship: Bronze
- 2016 FIBA South American Championship: Bronze
