= Mauricio Aguiar =

Uruguayan basketball player (born 1983)

Hebraica y Macabi
- Position: Forward
- League: Liga Uruguaya de Basketball

Personal information
- Born: February 3, 1983 (age 43) Montevideo, Uruguay
- Listed height: 6 ft 6 in (1.98 m)

Career information
- NBA draft: 2003: undrafted
- Playing career: 2000–present

Career history
- URU: Cordon Atletico
- ITA: Lauretana Biella
- ITA: Sardegna Sassari
- URU: Club Biguá
- ITA: Vanoli Soresina
- URU: Hebraica y Macabi

Career highlights
- Uruguayan League MVP (2012); Uruguayan League Finals MVP (2012)
Medals
Men's basketball
Representing Uruguay
Pan American Games
Bronze medal – third place	2007 Rio de Janeiro
FIBA South American Championship
Bronze medal – third place	2003 Montevideo
Silver medal – second place	2006 Caracas
Silver medal – second place	2008 Puerto Montt
Bronze medal – third place	2010 Neiva
Bronze medal – third place	2012 Resistencia

Mauricio "El Pica” Aguiar (born February 3, 1983, in Montevideo) is a Uruguayan professional basketball player. He is a longtime member of the Uruguay national basketball team and is currently playing professionally with Hebraica y Macabi of the Uruguayan Liga Uruguaya de Basketball

== Professional career ==
Aguiar began his career for the Uruguay basketball league in 2000. He spent his first three years (2000–03) playing with Uruguayan team Cordon Atletico. After three solid seasons with the team, Aguiar declared for the 2003 NBA draft. However, he went undrafted.

Following this, Aguiar moved to Italy to continue his career with Lauretana Biella of the Italian League. He saw little action off the bench in two seasons with the team, averaging only 4.0 points and 0.8 rebounds per game his first season and 5.3 points and 0.9 rebounds per game his second season.

Since 2006, Aguiar has bounced between teams in Uruguay and teams in Italy. In his most recent season, 2008–09, he began the year with Club Biguá in Uruguay, averaging 8.8 points and 3 rebounds per game for the club in the 2008-09 Americas League while playing alongside fellow Uruguay national basketball team members Leandro Garcia Morales and Martin Osimani. In April, he was signed by Italian team Vanoli Soresina for the last 16 games of the team's season. Aguiar quickly jumped into the team's rotation, averaging 9.2 points and 21.3 minutes per game for the season. Following the season, the team extended his contract for the 2009-10 season.

== National team career ==
Aguiar is a long-time member of the Uruguayan national basketball team. He has been selected for the Uruguayans for the last four continental championships, the 2003, 2005, 2007, and FIBA Americas Championship 2009.
