= Luciano Parodi =

Uruguayan basketball player

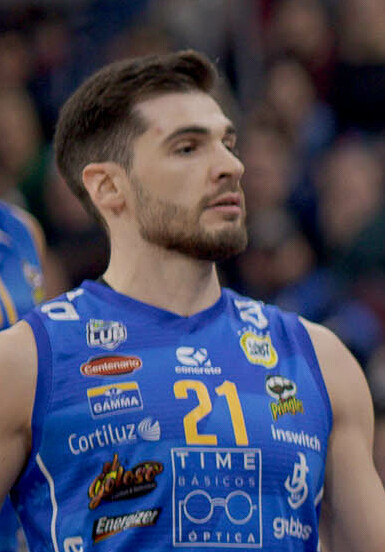

No. 21 – Hebraica Macabi
- Position: Point guard
- League: Uruguayan League

Personal information
- Born: February 16, 1994 (age 32) Paysandú, Uruguay
- Listed height: 6 ft 0 in (1.83 m)
- Listed weight: 180 lb (82 kg)

Career information
- NBA draft: 2016: undrafted
- Playing career: 2009–present

Career history
- 2009: Paysandú
- 2009–2017: Hebraica Macabi
- 2017–2018: Bahía Blanca
- 2018: Dinamo Sassari
- 2018–2019: Corinthians
- 2019–2020: Franca
- 2020–2021: Minas
- 2021–2022: s.Oliver Würzburg
- 2022–present: Hebraica Macabi

Career highlights
- 3× Uruguayan League champion (2012, 2016, 2017); Uruguayan League MVP (2016); Uruguayan League Finals MVP (2016)

Luciano Parodi González (born February 16, 1994) is a Uruguayan professional basketball player for Hebraica Macabi of the Uruguayan League. A three-time Uruguayan League champion with Hebraica Macabi. Parodi was named Uruguayan League MVP and Finals MVP in 2016.

== Early life ==
Parodi was born in Paysandú, Uruguay. He played for Paysandú and Hebraica Macabi youth teams.

== Professional career ==
=== Hebraica Macabi (2009–2017) ===
After starting his career in 2009 with Paysandú, Parodi moved to Hebraica Macabi, later that same year. Parodi helped Hebraica to win the 2016 Uruguayan League championship, and he was named the Uruguayan League MVP. In his next season, Parodi averaged 12.8 points, 3.5 rebounds, 6.6 assists and 2.3 steals per game and helped Hebraica to win the title two years in a row.

=== Bahía Blanca (2017–2018) ===
On June 14, 2017, Parodi signed a one-year deal with the Argentine League team Bahía Blanca. On January 31, 2018, Parodi recorded a career-high 27 points, shooting 8-of-15 from the field, along with four rebounds and six assists in a 93–90 win over Boca Juniors.

=== Be'er Sheva / Sassari (2018) ===
On July 14, 2018, Parodi signed with the Israeli League team Hapoel Be'er Sheva for the 2018–19 season. However, on September 16, 2018, Parodi parted ways with Be'er Sheva before appearing in a game for them. On September 27, 2018, Parodi signed a one-year deal with the Italian League team Dinamo Sassari. On November 26, 2018, Parodi parted ways with Sassari after appearing in six games.

=== Corinthians (2018–2019) ===
On December 3, 2018, Parodi signed with Corinthians Paulista of the NBB.

=== Franca (2019–2020) ===
On June 28, 2019 Parodi signed with Franca for the 2019–20 NBB season.

=== Minas (2020–2021) ===
In summer 2020, he has signed with Minas of the NBB.

=== s.Oliver Würzburg (2021–present) ===
On June 23, 2021, he has signed with s.Oliver Würzburg of the German Basketball Bundesliga.

== National team career ==
Parodi is a member of Uruguayan national basketball team, he participated in the 2013, 2015 and 2017 FIBA AmeriCup tournaments, as well as the 2019 FIBA World Cup qualification games.
