= Bruno Fitipaldo =

Uruguayan-Italian basketball player

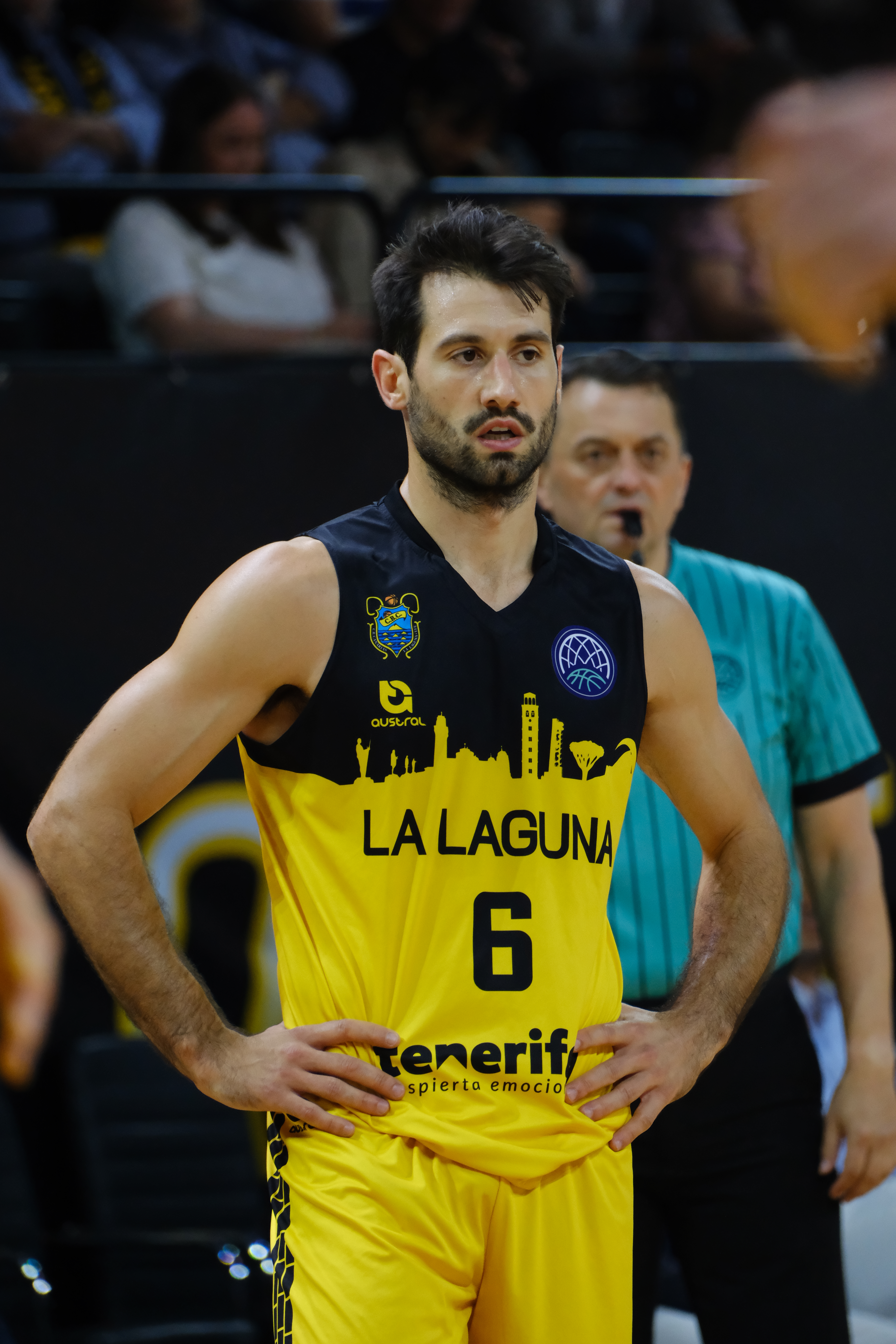
- Fitipaldo with Canarias in 2025

No. 6 – La Laguna Tenerife
- Position: Point guard / Shooting guard
- League: Liga ACB

Personal information
- Born: August 2, 1991 (age 35) Montevideo, Uruguay
- Listed height: 1.85 m (6 ft 1 in)
- Listed weight: 85 kg (187 lb)

Career information
- NBA draft: 2013: undrafted
- Playing career: 2006–present

Career history
- 2006–2014: Club Malvín
- 2014–2016: Obras Sanitarias
- 2016: Orlandina
- 2016–2017: Galatasaray
- 2017–2018: Felice Scandone
- 2018–2020: San Pablo Burgos
- 2020–present: La Laguna Tenerife

Career highlights
- Champions League champion (2022); FIBA Intercontinental Cup champion (2023); FIBA Intercontinental Cup MVP (2023); Liga ACB Free Throw Percentage leader (2022); 2× Uruguayan League champion (2011, 2014); Uruguayan League MVP (2014); Uruguayan League Finals MVP (2014)
Medals
Men's basketball
Representing Uruguay
FIBA South American Championship
| Bronze medal – third place | 2010 Colombia |
| Bronze medal – third place | 2012 Argentina |
| Bronze medal – third place | 2016 Venezuela |

Bruno Fitipaldo Rodríguez (born August 2, 1991) is a Uruguayan-Italian professional basketball player for La Laguna Tenerife of the Spanish Liga ACB. Standing at a height of 1.84 m (6 ft 1/2 in), he plays at the point guard and shooting guard positions.

== Professional career ==
=== South America ===
Fitipaldo began his professional career in the 2006–07 season, with the Uruguayan League's Club Malvín, in the city of Montevideo. During his time in the Uruguayan League of basketball, he became the club's local idol, due to his great performances. In the 2010–11 season, Fitipaldo won the Uruguayan national league title with his team, as he averaged 8.0 points, 1.5 rebounds, 2.6 assists, and 1.3 steals per game, in 41 games played.

At only 20, he was in the starting five of the Uruguayan team, and at the end of the 2011–12 season, he had averaged 10.4 points, 3.5 rebounds, 5.6 assists, and 1.3 steals per game, in 39 games played. In the 2013–14 season, Fitipaldo was named the MVP of the Uruguayan League. He later moved to the Argentine League club Obras Sanitarias, where he played during the 2014–15 and 2015–16 seasons.

=== Europe ===
In July 2016, the Italian LBA League side Orlandina Basket, announced the official the signing of Fitipaldo. On November 5, 2016, Fitipaldo was the LBA's MVP for the Round 6 of games. The Uruguayan-Italian point guard finished the round 6 game, with 33 points scored, in an Orlandina overtime win against Brescia. Fitipaldo played 45 minutes, and also added 3 rebounds, 10 assists, 9 fouls drawn, and a 44 evaluation.

However, in December of that same year, Fitipaldo left Orlandina, and signed with the Turkish Super League side Galatasaray, for the rest of the 2016–17 season. On June 23, 2017, Fitipaldo returned to Italy, and signed with Scandone Avellino. On August 1, 2018, Fitipaldo signed a one-yar deal with the Spanish League club San Pablo Burgos.

==== Canarias (2020–present) ====
He signed with Canarias (then known as Iberostar Tenerife for sponsorship reasons) of the Liga ACB on July 11, 2020.

In 2022, Fitipaldo won the 2021–22 Basketball Champions League with Canarias, his first continental title. Because of this, the team played in the 2023 FIBA Intercontinental Cup. Here, Fitipaldo guided Canarias to their third world title, as he had 12 points, 4 rebounds and 6 assists in the semi-final against Monastir and 15 points and 6 assists in the final against São Paulo. After the tournament, Fitipaldo was named the Intercontinental Cup MVP.

== National team career ==
Fitipaldo is a member of the senior Uruguayan national basketball team. He won the bronze medal at the 2010 FIBA South American Championship, 2012 FIBA South American Championship, and 2016 FIBA South American Championships.

== Honours and titles ==
- FIBA South American Championship
  - 2010 Colombia: Bronze
  - 2012 Argentina: Bronze
  - 2016 Venezuela: Bronze
