= Leandro García Morales =

Uruguayan-Italian basketball player

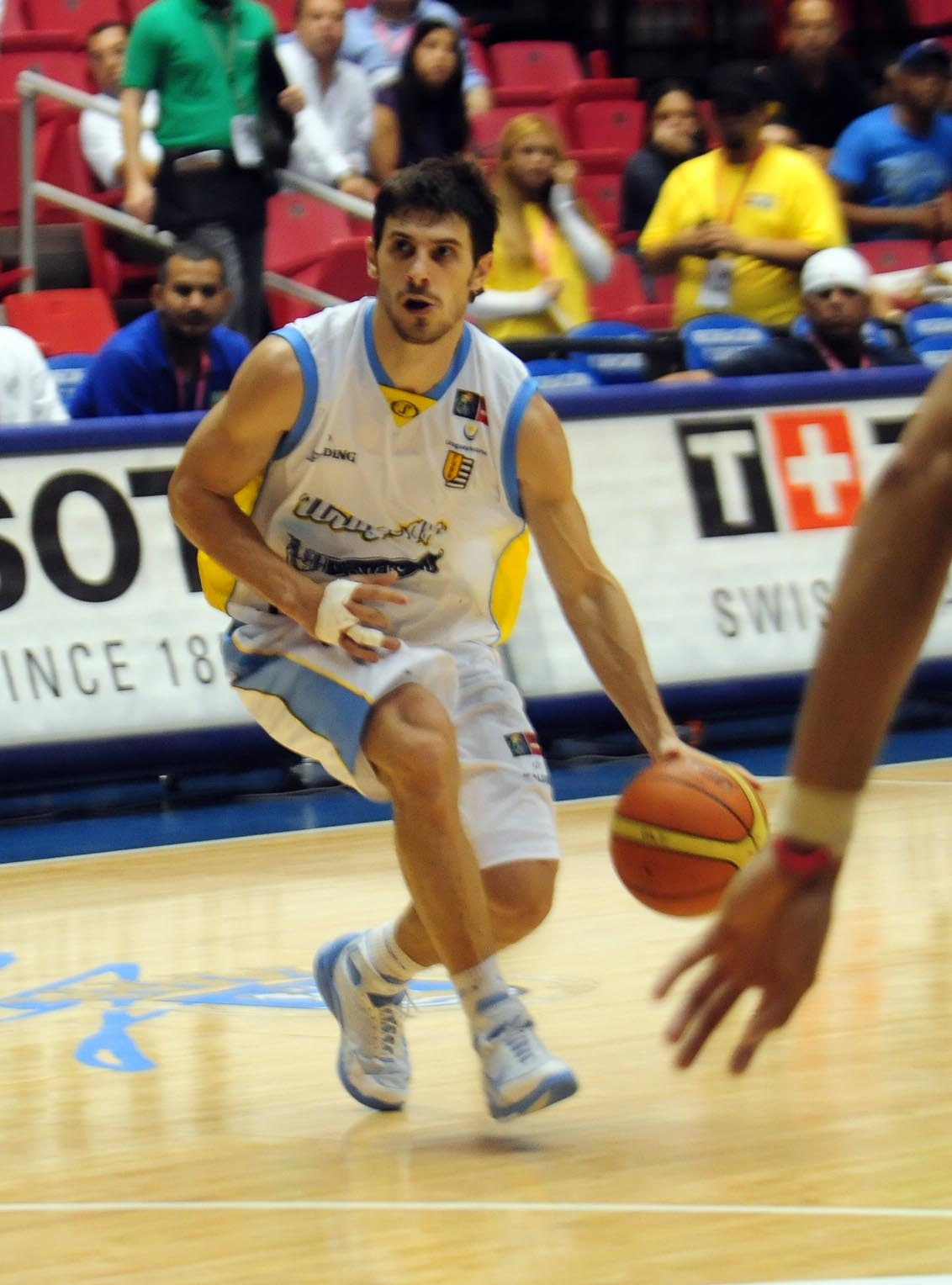
- García Morales, playing with the Uruguayan NT, in 2009.

Peñarol
- Position: Assistant coach
- League: Liga Uruguaya de Básquetbol

Personal information
- Born: June 27, 1980 (age 46) Montevideo, Uruguay
- Listed height: 6 ft 2 in (1.88 m)
- Listed weight: 186 lb (84 kg)

Career information
- High school: Hickman (Columbia, Missouri)
- College: Lynn (2000–2001); Miami Dade (2001–2002); Texas A&M (2002–2004)
- NBA draft: 2004: undrafted
- Coaching career: 2024–present

Career history

Playing
- 2005: Viola Reggio Calabria
- 2006: Junior Casale
- 2006–2007: ICD Pedro Echague
- 2006–2009: Club Biguá de Villa Biarritz
- 2008–2012: Cocodrilos de Caracas
- 2009: Saba Mehr
- 2009–2011: Halcones UV Xalapa
- 2011–2012: Club Biguá de Villa Biarritz
- 2012: San Martín de Corrientes
- 2012–2014: Club Atlético Aguada
- 2014–2015: Capitanes de Arecibo
- 2015: Club Atlético Aguada
- 2015–2018: Hebraica y Macabi
- 2018–2019: Instituto Atlético Central Córdoba
- 2019–2022: Club Atlético Aguada
- 2022–2023: Larre Borges
- 2023: Club Biguá de Villa Biarritz

Coaching
- 2024: Astros de Jalisco
- 2025–: Peñarol (Assistant)

Career highlights
- 3× FIBA Americas League Top Scorer (2009, 2010, 2014); South American Club champion (2008); 2× Venezuelan League champion (2008, 2010); Mexican League champion (2010); 5× Uruguayan League champion (2008, 2009, 2013, 2016, 2017); 4× Uruguayan League MVP (2008, 2009, 2013, 2017); 4× Uruguayan League Finals MVP (2008, 2009, 2013, 2017)
Medals
Men's basketball
Representing Uruguay
Pan American Games
Bronze medal – third place	2007 Rio de Janeiro
FIBA South American Championship
Silver medal – second place	2006 Caracas
Silver medal – second place	2008 Puerto Montt
Bronze medal – third place	2003 Montevideo
Bronze medal – third place	2012 Resistencia

Leandro García Morales (born June 27, 1980) is a Uruguayan-Italian former professional basketball player and current head coach. At a height 1.88 m (6 ft 2 in) tall, he played at the shooting guard position. He was also a member of the senior Uruguayan national basketball team. He currently coaches for Astros de Jalisco.

== College career ==
García Morales moved from Montevideo to Hialeah, Florida, to attend high school there. He was joined in his senior season by fellow Uruguayan national team member, Martin Osimani, at Champagnat Catholic High School. He first attended NCAA Division II school Lynn University. In his only season with the school, he earned NCAA Division II All-American Honorable Mention honors, and was named to the All-Freshman Team.

García Morales then transferred to Miami-Dade Community College. In one season there, he finished in the top ten in the nation in scoring, assists, and steals, while averaging 22.9 points, 9 assists, and 3.6 steals per game. He earned All-Region honors. After one season of playing JUCO ball, García Morales again committed to play college basketball, this time at Texas A&M University, after originally also considering the University of Miami, Xavier University, and Auburn University, among others. He played two seasons with the Aggies, averaging 6.5 points and 1.9 assists per game in his senior season.

== Professional career ==
After graduating from college, García Morales played for teams in Italy, Argentina, Venezuela, Iran, Mexico, and Puerto Rico. Along with Martin Osimani, he helped lead Club Biguá to the 2008 Uruguayan League championship, averaging 25.9 points per game for the team.

With Cocodrilos de Caracas, he won the Venezuelan League championship in 2008 and 2010. With Halcones UV Xalapa, he also won the Mexican League championship in 2010.

== National team career ==
Garcia Morales was also a member of the senior Uruguayan national basketball team. Some of the tournaments he played at include the 2005, 2007, and 2009 editions of the FIBA AmeriCup.
