= 2010 South American Basketball Championship =

44th South American Basketball Championship

Tournament details
- Host country: Colombia
- Dates: July 26–31
- Teams: 8 (from 10 federations)
- Venue: 1 (in 1 host city)

Final positions
- Champions: Brazil (18th title)

Tournament statistics
- MVP: (Brazil) Murilo Becker

Official website
- South American Basketball Championship 2010

The 2010 South American Basketball Championship was the 44th edition of the South American Basketball Championship. Eight teams featured the competition, held in Neiva, Colombia from 26 to July 31 in the Coliseo Álvaro Sánchez Silva. Argentina was the defending champion, but lost in the final to Brazil. The first three places qualified for the basketball tournament at the 2011 Pan American Games and to the 2011 FIBA Americas Championship, the latter of which doubled as the FIBA Americas qualifier for the 2012 Olympics. Because Argentina, which automatically qualified for the FIBA Americas Championship as host, finished in an automatic qualifying spot, the fourth-place team was also invited to that competition. The fifth-place team did not initially qualify for that competition, but was later invited once the United States withdrew from that event because it had qualified for the Olympics by winning the 2010 FIBA World Championship.

== Preliminary round ==
Qualified for the semifinals
Team will compete in Classification Round

=== Group A ===
Team	Pts	Pld	W	L	PF	PA	PD
Brazil	6	3	3	0	251	198	+53
Uruguay	5	3	2	1	204	214	−10
Paraguay	4	3	1	2	218	231	−13
Chile	3	3	0	3	190	220	−30

July 26
15:00

Report

Uruguay	66–61	Paraguay
Scoring by quarter: 15–13, 14–12, 20–19, 17–17
Pts: Aguiar 20; Rebs: Batista 16; Asts: Aguiar 7		Pts: Araujo 29; Rebs: Araujo 14; Asts: Martínez 8

July 26
17:00

Report

Brazil	69–54	Chile
Scoring by quarter: 24–15, 8–12, 19–12, 18–15
Pts: Becker 20; Rebs: Becker 11; Asts: dos Santos 7		Pts: Espinoza, Arteaga and Carrasco 12 each Rebs: Valencia 8 Asts: Carrasco and Briones 3 each

July 27
15:00

Report

Chile	72–76	Paraguay
Scoring by quarter: 16–17, 15–26, 23–24, 18–9
Pts: Briones 20; Rebs: Carrasco 8 Asts: Carrasco 6		Pts: Zanotti 16; Rebs: Martínez and Zanotti 8 each Asts: Martínez 7

July 27
19:00

Report

Brazil	89–63	Uruguay
Scoring by quarter: 29–16, 15–18, 20–12, 25–17
Pts: Tavernari 15; Rebs: Becker 8 Asts: Chiantia 10		Pts: Espinoza, Arteaga and Carrasco 12 each Rebs: Valencia 8 Asts: Carrasco and Briones 3 each

July 28
17:00

Report

Brazil	93–81	Paraguay
Scoring by quarter: 24–23, 25–16, 26–23, 18–19
Pts: Becker 20; Rebs: Becker 9 Asts: dos Santos 8		Pts: Martínez 18; Rebs: Araujo 14; Asts: Martínez, Zanotti and Araujo 3

July 28
19:00

Report

Chile	64–75	Uruguay
Scoring by quarter: 18–16, 17–11, 15–26, 14–22
Pts: Briones 19; Rebs: Briones 8 Asts: Carrasco 8		Pts: Martínez 23; Rebs: Batista 9 Asts: Osimani 6

=== Group B ===
Team	Pts	Pld	W	L	PF	PA	PD
Argentina	5	3	2	1	249	181	+68
Venezuela	5	3	2	1	251	198	+53
Colombia	5	3	2	1	241	199	+42
Ecuador	3	3	0	3	132	305	−173

July 26
19:00

Report

Venezuela	75–72	Argentina
Scoring by quarter: 18–19, 21–14, 21–15, 15–24
Pts: Romero 14; Rebs: Sucre 12; Asts: Romero 5		Pts: Gutiérrez 17; Rebs: Sandes 14; Asts: Schattmann and Mainoldi 4 each

July 26
21:00

Report

Colombia	94–46	Ecuador
Scoring by quarter: 26–4, 20–11, 22–14, 26–17
Pts: Ortiz 28; Rebs: Hernández 18; Asts: Moreno 4		Pts: Díaz 11; Rebs: Pauta 12; Asts: Pérez 4

July 27
17:00

Report

Argentina	107–43	Ecuador
Scoring by quarter: 19–12, 29–8, 27–15, 32–8
Pts: Schattmann 19; Rebs: Aguerre and Vega 10 each Asts: Schattmann and Fernández 9 each		Pts: Díaz 11; Rebs: Gordón 5 Asts: Pérez 2

July 27
21:00

Report

Colombia	84–83 (OT)	Venezuela
Scoring by quarter: 19–29, 19–12, 24–21, 14–14, Overtime: 8–7
Pts: Ortiz 27; Rebs: Aragón 7 Asts: Moreno 5		Pts: Bethelmy 17; Rebs: Bethelmy and Sucre 11 each Asts: Bethelmy 5

July 28
15:00

Relatório

Venezuela	104–43	Ecuador
Scoring by quarter: 25–5, 26–10, 24–14, 29–14
Pts: Vargas 17; Rebs: Herrera 8 Asts: Cubillán and Guevara 5 each		Pts: Caicedo 13; Rebs: Caicedo 7 Asts: Gordón 3

July 28
21:00

Report

Colombia	63–70	Argentina
Scoring by quarter: 15–13, 11–19, 19–23, 18–15
Pts: Ortiz 23; Rebs: Hernández 7 Asts: Moreno 5		Pts: Mainoldi 17; Rebs: Gutiérrez and González 11 each Asts: Cequeira 9

== Knockout round ==
=== Championship ===
Semi-finals
July 30 – Neiva
Brazil	79
Venezuela	67
July 30 – Neiva
Uruguay	73
Argentina	79

Final
July 31 – Neiva
Brazil	87
Argentina	77
Third place
July 31 – Neiva
Venezuela	70
Uruguay	76

==== Semifinals ====
July 30
19:00

Report

Uruguay	73–79	Argentina
Scoring by quarter: 19–21, 13–18, 18–16, 23–24
Pts: Aguiar 24; Rebs: Izaguirre 8 Asts: Martínez and Osimani 2 each		Pts: Cequeira and Mainoldi 17 each Rebs: Mainoldi 7 Asts: Cantero 8

July 30
21:00

Report

Brazil	79–67	Venezuela
Scoring by quarter: 18–20, 16–15, 23–15, 22–17
Pts: Becker 25; Rebs: Becker 7 Asts: dos Santos 8		Pts: Pérez 22; Rebs: Sucre 8 Asts: Centeno 4

==== Bronze medal game ====
July 31
19:00

Report

Venezuela	70–76	Uruguay
Scoring by quarter: 17–24, 21–8, 19–18, 13–26
Pts: Sucre 21; Rebs: Sucre 10; Asts: Centeno 3		Pts: Aguiar 21; Rebs: Batista 11; Asts: Osimani 6

==== Final ====
July 31
21:00

Report

Brazil	87–77	Argentina
Scoring by quarter: 19–18, 21–13, 22–21, 25–25
Pts: Becker 30; Rebs: Becker 10; Asts: dos Santos, Machado and Chiantia 5 each		Pts: Cantero 25; Rebs: Sandes, Cequeira and Mainoldi 4 each Asts: Schattman 5

=== 5th–8th playoffs ===
Semi-finals
July 30 – Neiva
Ecuador	45
Paraguay	89
July 30 – Neiva
Colombia	78
Chile	71

Fifth place
July 31 – Neiva
Paraguay	86
Colombia	66
Seventh place
July 31 – Neiva
Ecuador	70
Chile	88

==== 5th–8th semifinals ====
July 30
15:00

Report

Ecuador	45–89	Paraguay
Scoring by quarter: 19–21, 8–23, 11–23, 7–22
Pts: Díaz 11; Rebs: Mina 16; Asts: Gordón 4		Pts: Zanotti, Torres and Fabio 19 each Rebs: Fabio 13; Asts: Zanotti 6

July 30
17:00

Report

Colombia	78–71	Chile
Scoring by quarter: 20–14, 21–19, 17–19, 20–19
Pts: Ortiz 22; Rebs: Guevara 9 Asts: Moreno 5		Pts: Briones 17; Rebs: Prutzmann 9 Asts: Espinoza 4

==== 7th place playoff ====
July 31
15:00

Report

Ecuador	70–88	Chile
Scoring by quarter: 14–22, 15–20, 15–29, 26–17
Pts: Díaz 30; Rebs: Caicedo 7 Asts: Gordón and Soto 3 each		Pts: Arteaga 18; Rebs: Velásquez and Briones 8 each Asts: Velásquez 7

==== 5th place playoff ====
July 31
17:00

Report

Paraguay	86–66	Colombia
Scoring by quarter: 26–19, 30–13, 18–19, 12–15
Pts: Araujo 20; Rebs: Fabio 11; Asts: Martínez 8		Pts: Aragón 20; Rebs: Aragón and Hernández 6 each Asts: Ortiz 6

== Final standings ==
Rank	Team	Record
1st place, gold medalist(s)	Brazil	5–0
2nd place, silver medalist(s)	Argentina	3–2
3rd place, bronze medalist(s)	Uruguay	3–2
4th	Venezuela	2–3
5th	Paraguay	3–2
6th	Colombia	3–2
7th	Chile	1–4
8th	Ecuador	0–5
