= Donald Sims =

American basketball player (born 1987)

Personal information
- Born: April 25, 1987 (age 39) Gaffney, South Carolina, U.S.
- Listed height: 6 ft 1 in (1.85 m)
- Listed weight: 170 lb (77 kg)

Career information
- High school: Gaffney (Gaffney, South Carolina); Fork Union (Fork Union, Virginia)
- College: Appalachian State (2007–2011)
- NBA draft: 2011: undrafted
- Playing career: 2011–present
- Position: Point guard

Career history
- 2011–2012: Reno Bighorns
- 2011–2012: Gaiteros del Zulia
- 2012–2013: Ventspils
- 2013–2014: Dnipro-Azot
- 2014: Marinos de Anzoátegui
- 2014–2016: Brussels
- 2016–2017: Club de Regatas Corrientes
- 2017–2018: Atenas de Córdoba
- 2018–2019: San Lorenzo
- 2019–2020: Aguacateros de Michoacán
- 2021–2023: Club Biguá
- 2023-2025: Aguada
- 2025: Soles de Mexicali

Career highlights
- BCL Americas top scorer (2022); LNBP Foreign MVP (2022); LNBP All-Star (2022); 2× LUB champion (2021, 2022); LUB Most Valuable Player (2021); LUB Finals MVP (2022); FIBA Americas League champion (2019); Baltic League champion (2013); Venezuelan League champion (2014); Ukrainian SuperLeague top scorer (2014); SoCon Player of the Year – Media (2010); 2× First-team All-SoCon (2010, 2011)

Donald Erick Sims (born April 25, 1987) is an American professional basketball player for Aguada of the Liga Uruguaya de Básquetbol. He was a standout college basketball player at Appalachian State University, and has played professionally in several countries. He plays at the point guard position.

== High school career ==
Sims, who is originally from Gaffney, South Carolina, attended Gaffney High School, where he led his school to three consecutive AAAA state titles (the first school to achieve this feat), amassing an 81–3 record in his three seasons there. After prepping a year at Fork Union Military Academy, in Fork Union, Virginia, he chose to play college basketball at Appalachian State.

== College career ==
At Appalachian State, Sims became a standout performer. As a junior, in 2009–10, Sims averaged 20.4 points per game, and was named the Malcolm U. Pitt Southern Conference player of the year, by the league's media. As a senior, Sims averaged 21 points per game, and passed the 2,000 point mark for his career. He graduated as ASU's all-time leading scorer, with 2,185 points.

== Professional career ==
After college, Sims was not drafted in the 2011 NBA draft. After a stint with the Reno Bighorns, of the NBA Development League, he signed with Gaiteros del Zulia, in Venezuela, for the remainder of the season. For the 2012–13 season, he signed with Ventspils of the Latvian Basketball League, where he averaged 10.0 points per game.

For the 2014–15 season, Sims signed with the Belgian club Basic-Fit Brussels. For the 2016–17 season, Sims signed in Argentina, with Club de Regatas Corrientes. He became one of the key players of the team, and made it to the league's finals.

In 2019, Sims signed with Aguacateros de Michoacán of the Mexican Liga Nacional de Baloncesto Profesional (LNBP) and averaged 18.3 points, 2.4 rebounds, 3.2 assists, and 1.5 steals per game. He re-signed with the team on July 17, 2020.

In the 2020–21 season, Sims played with Club Biguá in the Liga Uruguaya de Básquetbol (LUB). He was named MVP of the league, after scoring 30 points and giving 10 assists in Game 5 of the finals against Nacional.

In the next season, Biguá repeated as LUB champions and Sims was named the league's Finals MVP.

In June 2022, Sims returned to Mexico, joining the Dorados de Chihuahua. He earned LNBP Foreign MVP honors.
