= Dwayne Davis =

American basketball player

No. 73 – Trotamundos de Carabobo
- Position: Small forward
- League: SPB

Personal information
- Born: November 27, 1989 (age 36) Philadelphia, Pennsylvania, U.S.
- Listed height: 6 ft 5 in (1.96 m)
- Listed weight: 205 lb (93 kg)

Career information
- High school: Strawberry Mansion (Philadelphia, Pennsylvania)
- College: Redlands CC (2009–2010); Midland (2010–2011); Southern Miss (2012–2013)
- NBA draft: 2013: undrafted
- Playing career: 2013–present

Career history
- 2013–2014: UCAM Murcia
- 2014–2016: Koroivos
- 2016: Hoops Club
- 2016–2017: Aurora Basket Jesi
- 2017–2018: Instituto ACC
- 2018: Vaqueros de Bayamón
- 2018–2019: Aguada
- 2019–2020: Instituto ACC
- 2020–2021: Aguada
- 2021–2022: Janus Basket Fabriano
- 2022–2023: Club Trouville
- 2023–present: Trotamundos de Carabobo

Career highlights
- LUB champion (2020); LUB Most Valuable Player (2020); BCL Americas Top Scorer (2020); All-Argentine League Team (2018); Italian Second Division Top Scorer (2017); First-team All-Conference USA (2013)
- Stats at Basketball Reference

Dwayne Davis (born November 27, 1989) is an American professional basketball player for the Trotamundos de Carabobo of the Superliga Profesional de Baloncesto (SPB). At 6'5", he plays as a small forward. Davis entered the 2013 NBA draft but was not selected in the draft's two rounds.

== College career ==
Davis managed to become the first person in his family to finish high school, which allowed him to make a name in Strawberry Mansion High School, noted in the NJCAA. He started playing college basketball in 2009 with Redlands Community College. He also played college basketball at Midland College, College of Midland, until it appeared a coach who changed his life, Donnie Tyndall. It was really a bet on him in his youth, and gave him the chance to play in the NCAA wearing the shirt of the University of Southern Miss. In the 2012/13 season he averaged 16 points, 4.5 rebounds and 2.6 assists per game in 34 games with Southern Miss Golden Eagles. He had a success rate of 53.2% shooting two and 41.3% in threes.

== Professional career ==
After the NBA Draft he moved to play in Europe for the UCAM Murcia from the Liga ACB.

For the 2014–15, he signed with Koroivos Amaliadas of the Greek Basket League. In 13 games for Koroivos in 2014–15 season, he averaged 12.5 points, 3.8 rebounds, 1.1 assists and 0.4 steals per game. He renewed his contract with Koroivos for one more season and he became the star of the club. In 19 games for Koroivos in the 2015–16 season, he averaged 18.3 points, 5.1 rebounds, 1.8 assists and 0.8 steals per game, being the second scorer of the league, including an amazing 36point performance against Arkadikos.

On April 23, 2016, Davis signed with Hoops Club of the Lebanese Basketball League, replacing Antwain Barbour on the team's squad.

On August 6, 2017, Davis joined Instituto ACC of the LNB.

Davis spent the 2020–21 season in Uruguay with Club Atlético Aguada, averaging 14.9 points, 3.7 rebounds and 3.7 assists per game. On August 8, 2021, he signed with Janus Basket Fabriano of the Serie B Basket. Davis averaged 18.8 points, 4.2 rebounds, and 2.4 assists per game. On January 15, 2022, he signed with Club Trouville.

== Personal life ==
Davis's mother died when he was 13 years old and he had to get a job to help take care of younger siblings.
