= Campeonato Uruguayo Federal de Básquetbol =

Basketball competition in Uruguay

Campeonato Uruguayo Federal de Básquetbol Uruguayan Federal Basketball League
- Founded: 1915; 111 years ago
- Folded: 2003; 23 years ago
- Country: Uruguay
- Level on pyramid: 1 out of 3
- Relegation to: Segunda de Ascenso
- Most championships: Defensor Sporting (18 titles)
- All-time top scorer: Wilfredo "Fefo" Ruiz (18,512)
- Website: www.fubb.org.uy

The Campeonato Uruguayo Federal de Básquetbol (CFB) (English: Uruguayan Federal Basketball Championship) was the top-tier level men's basketball national club competition in Uruguay. It was organized by the Uruguayan Basketball Federation (FUBB). It existed from 1915 to 2003, when it was replaced by the newly formed Liga Uruguaya de Básquetbol (LUB) (Uruguayan Basketball League). The worst performing teams of each season of the competition were relegated down to the second-tier level Segunda de Ascenso (Second of Ascent), which itself was replaced by the Torneo Metropolitano (Metropolitan Tournament), in 2004.

== History ==
The Campeonato Uruguayo Federal de Básquetbol (Uruguayan Federal Basketball Championship) was founded in 1915, making it among the oldest basketball competitions on the South American continent. Until the Uruguayan Basketball League was created in 2003, the Montevideo clubs were playing in the Uruguayan Federal Basketball Championship, while the rest of the country's clubs played in regional tournaments. The Uruguayan basketball championships were only local, and no competition brought all of the clubs in the country together.

=== Names of the competition ===
- Campeonato Uruguayo de 1a. División de Básquetbol (Uruguayan Championship of 1a. Basketball Division): (1915–1918)
- Campeonato Uruguayo Nacional de Básquetbol (Uruguayan National Basketball Championship): (1918–1926)
- Campeonato Uruguayo Federal de Básquetbol (Uruguayan Federal Basketball Championship): (1927–2003)

=== Uruguayan Basketball League ===
The Liga Uruguaya de Básquetbol (LUB; Uruguayan Basketball League) competition replaced the Uruguayan Federal Basketball Championship, when it began in 2003.

== Uruguayan Federal champions ==
Campeonato 1a. División (Division 1. Championship)
Season	Champion
1915	ACJ (YMCA)
1916	Plaza N° 3
1917	A. U. de S.
1918*	Sporting
Campeonato Nacional (National Championship)
1918*	Atenas
1919	Atenas
1920	Atenas
1921	Atenas
1922	Sporting
1923	Olimpia
1924	Sporting
1925	Unión Atlética
1926	Sporting
Campeonato Federal (Federal Championship)
1927	Sporting
1928	Olimpia
1929	Olimpia
1930	Sporting
1931	Atenas
1932	Sporting
1933	Sporting
1934	Sporting
1935	Nacional
1936	Sporting
1937	Nacional
1938	Sporting
1939	Goes
1940	Aguada
1941	Aguada
1942	Aguada
1943	Aguada
1944	Peñarol
1945	Trouville
1946	Olimpia
1947	Goes
1948	Aguada
1949	Sporting
1950	Sporting
1951	Sporting
1952	Peñarol
1953	Welcome
1954	Stockolmo
1955	Sporting
1956	Welcome
1957	Welcome
1958	Goes
1959	Goes
1960	Tabaré
1961	Tabaré
1962	Tabaré
1963	Bohemios
1964	Tabaré
1965	Olimpia
1966	Welcome
1967	Welcome
1968	Tabaré
1969	Atenas
1970	Olimpia
1971	Olimpia
1972	Olimpia
1973	Peñarol
1974	Aguada
1975	Hebraica Macabi
1976	Aguada
1977	Hebraica Macabi
1978	Peñarol
1979	Peñarol
1980	Sporting
1981	Bohemios
1982	Peñarol
1983	Bohemios
1984	Bohemios
1985	Sporting
1986	Cordón
1987	Bohemios
1988	Biguá
1989	Biguá
1990	Biguá
1991	Cordón
1992	Cordón
1993	Cordón
1994	Hebraica Macabi
1995	Cordón
1996	Cordón
1997	Welcome
1998	Welcome
1999	Welcome
2000	Welcome
2001	Cordón
2002	Cordón
2003	Defensor Sporting

- There were two tournaments held in 1918.

=== Titles by club ===
Club	Championships won	Years won
Defensor Sporting	18	1918, 1922, 1924, 1926, 1927, 1930, 1932, 1933, 1934, 1936, 1938, 1949, 1950, 1951, 1955, 1980, 1985, 2003
Welcome	9	1953, 1956, 1957, 1966, 1967, 1997, 1998, 1999, 2000
Cordón	8	1986, 1991, 1992, 1993, 1995, 1996, 2001, 2002
Olimpia	8	1923, 1928, 1929, 1946, 1965, 1970, 1971, 1972
Aguada	7	1940, 1941, 1942, 1943, 1948, 1974, 1976
Atenas	6	1918, 1919, 1920, 1921, 1931, 1969
Peñarol	6	1944, 1952, 1973, 1978, 1979, 1982
Bohemios	5	1963, 1981, 1983, 1984, 1987
Tabaré	5	1960, 1961, 1962, 1964, 1968
Goes	4	1939, 1947, 1958, 1959
Biguá	3	1988, 1989, 1990
Hebraica Macabi	3	1975, 1977, 1994
Nacional	2	1935, 1937
Trouville	1	1945
Stockolmo	1	1954
Unión Atlética	1	1925
ACJ (YMCA)	1	1915
Plaza Nº 3	1	1916
A. U. de S.	1	1917

== All-time leading scorers ==
Rank	Player	Total points scored
1	Wilfredo "Fefo" Ruiz	18,512
2	Oscar Moglia	11,374
3	Omar Arrestia	10,250
4	Luis Silveira	8,689
5	Horacio López	8,338
6	Marcelo Capalbo	7,820
7	Adesio Lombardo	7,630
8	Fernando Martínez	7,168

== See also ==
- Uruguayan Basketball League (2003–present)
- Uruguayan Basketball Champions
- Uruguayan Basketball Federation (FUBB)

== Sources ==
- Greatest teams
