= Martín Osimani =

Uruguayan professional basketball player (born 1981)

No. 11 – Club Biguá de Villa Biarritz
- Position: Point guard
- League: Liga Uruguaya de Básquetbol

Personal information
- Born: May 22, 1981 (age 45) Montevideo, Uruguay
- Listed height: 6 ft 4 in (1.93 m)
- Listed weight: 205 lb (93 kg)

Career information
- High school: Champagnat Catholic School (Hialeah, Florida)
- College: Utah (2001–2002); Miami Dade (2002–2003); Duquesne (2003–2005)
- NBA draft: 2005: undrafted
- Playing career: 2005–present

Career history
- 2005–2009: Club Biguá
- 2008: Trotamundos de Carabobo
- 2009: Atléticos de San Germán
- 2009: Halcones UV Córdoba
- 2010: Trotamundos de Carabobo
- 2010: Halcones de Xalapa
- 2011: Soles de Mexicali
- 2011–2013: Obras Sanitarias
- 2013–2014: Brasília
- 2014: Club Atlético Aguada
- 2015: Defensor Sporting
- 2016–2017: Peñarol
- 2018: Boca Juniors
- 2018–2020: Club Biguá
- 2020–present: Club Atlético Goes
Medals
Men's basketball
Representing Uruguay
Pan American Games
| Bronze medal – third place | 2007 Rio de Janeiro |
FIBA South American Championship
| Bronze medal – third place | 2003 Montevideo |
| Silver medal – second place | 2006 Caracas |
| Bronze medal – third place | 2010 Neiva |

Martín Osimani (born May 22, 1981) is a Uruguayan professional basketball player. Born in Montevideo, he is a longtime member of the Uruguay national basketball team and is currently playing professionally with Club Biguá de Villa Biarritz in the Liga Uruguaya de Básquetbol.

== College career ==
Osimani moved from Montevideo to Hialeah, Florida to attend high school there. An All-state player after nearly averaging a triple double per game for Champagnat Catholic High School, he was ranked in the top 100 high school recruits by ESPN.com. He settled on the University of Utah after considering several powerhouse programs, including Duke University and UCLA. In his freshman season, Osimani played in 28 of the team's 30 games off the bench, but averaged only 1.2 points and 1.0 assists per game in 8.0 minutes per game of playing time.

Following a disappointing season at Utah, Osimani transferred back home to Miami-Dade Community College. In one season there, he averaged 8.3 points, 3.8 rebounds, 6.9 assists and 3.5 steals per game in earning All-Conference honors. After one season of JUCO ball, Osimani again committed to play NCAA ball, this time at Duquesne University. He started at point guard for two years for the Dukes, and had two successful seasons for the team, including a 172 assist junior season that put him at second on Duquesne's all-time single season assist chart.

== Professional career ==
After graduating, Osimani returned home to Uruguay to play for Club Bigua of the Liga Uruguaya de Basketball Along with Leandro García Morales, he helped lead Club Bigua to the 2008 Uruguayan League title. In four years as a professional, he has played for teams in Uruguay, Venezuela, and Puerto Rico. As starting point guard, he helped lead Club Sandwich to the 2008 Uruguayan League title.

== National team career ==
Osimani has played for various age groups on the Uruguayan national basketball team since 1998. He has been selected for the Uruguayans for the last three continental championships, the 2005, 2007, and FIBA Americas Championship 2009.
