= Luis Silveira (basketball) =

Uruguayan basketball player

Luis Silveira (born 16 January 1971) is a former Uruguayan professional basketball player.

== Professional career ==
Silveira was the Uruguayan League MVP, and Uruguayan League Finals MVP, in 2005.
