= Club Atlético Welcome =

- Nickname: Welcome, La W (The W); Rey de Copas (King of Cups)
- League: Uruguayan Basketball League
- Founded: 26 October 1926
- Arena: Estadio Óscar Magurno
- Location: Emilio Frugoni 924, Parque Rodó, Montevideo, Uruguay
- General manager: Wilfredo Ruiz
- Head coach: Javier Espíndola
- Website: twitter.com/Welcomeoficial
Home	Away

Club Atlético Welcome or simply Welcome is a Uruguayan basketball club in Montevideo, member of the Uruguayan Basketball Federation. It was founded on 13 October 1926. Welcome, and promoted to the Uruguayan Basketball League (LUB) getting the second direct ascent in 2014. Its headquarters and metropolitan stage called "Estadio Oscar Magurno" is on the street Emilio Frugoni 924 corner Gonzalo Ramirez, in Parque Rodó neighborhood.

== History ==
With nine titles to its credit, Club Atlético Welcome is one of the most successful basketball clubs in the country. Along with Club Atlético Aguada y Club Atlético Atenas holds the record with four consecutive national championships obtained in the case of Welcome from 1997 to 2000.

Other facts to note is that the Athletic Club Welcome emerged two of the most renowned players of Uruguay, as were Oscar Moglia and Wilfredo "Fefo" Ruiz, who was the top scorer in basketball of Uruguay, with record unequaled to this day, for example having scored 84 points in one game, when there was no rule of three-point shot. (This mark was achieved defending the club Neptune)

Club Atlético Welcome promoted by its youth academy the only Uruguayan player to have played in the NBA and currently playing in the Greek Basket League for the European powerhouse Panathinaikos, Esteban Batista, who had played for the Atlanta Hawks.

== Titles ==
Uruguayan League

- Winners (9): 1953, 1956, 1957, 1966, 1967, 1997, 1998, 1999, 2000

American competitions: South American Club Championship

- Runners-up (3): 1967, 1968, 1998
