= Club Atlético Olimpia =

- Nickname: Alas Rojas; La Máquina Blanca
- Leagues: Liga Uruguaya de Básquetbol
- Founded: 1918
- Arena: Estadio La Cupula
- Capacity: 1,100
- Location: Montevideo, Uruguay
- Team colors: White and Red
- President: Fernando Stagnari
- Head coach: Gerardo Jauri
- Championships: 8 (CFB: 1923, 1928, 1929, 1946, 1965, 1970, 1971, 1972)
- Website: olimpia.uy
Home	Away

Club Atlético Olimpia, or simply Olimpia, is a sports club based in Montevideo, Uruguay. The club's main sport is basketball, with the basketball team having won eight championships in the now-defunct Campeonato Uruguayo Federal de Básquetbol (CFB). The team currently competes in the Liga Uruguaya de Básquetbol (LUB).

== History ==
Olimpia was founded on 17 September 1918. In 1946, Olimpia won the South American Club Championships. Between 1923 and 1972, the team won eight championships in the Campeonato Uruguayo Federal de Básquetbol (CFB).

== Head coaches ==
- (Uruguay) Gerardo Jauri (2019–2022)
