= Uruguayan Basketball Federation =

Uruguayan Basketball Federation Federación Uruguaya de Basketball
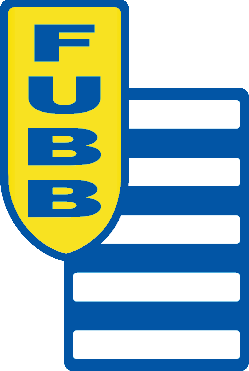
- Sport: Basketball
- Jurisdiction: Uruguay
- Abbreviation: FUBB
- Founded: 1915
- Affiliation: FIBA
- Affiliation date: FIBA 1936; FIBA Americas 1975
- Regional affiliation: FIBA Americas
- President: Luis A. Castillo
- (Uruguay)

The Uruguayan Basketball Federation (Spanish: Federación Uruguaya de Basketball, FUBB) is the governing body of basketball in Uruguay. It was founded in 1915, and is in charge of the senior Uruguayan national basketball team and the Liga Uruguaya de Básquetbol (LUB).

== History ==
Under the presidency of Federico Crocker. Basketball languished in Uruguay under the effects of Association football's popularity; at the 1936 Olympic Games, however, the Uruguayan National basketball team obtained a sixth place, which helped boost the sport's popularity in the Latin American country. That same year, the "FUBB" became a member of FIBA. After, the Uruguayan Basketball team won two bronze medals, in the olympic games of Helsinki 1952 and Melbourne 1956, both times after USA and USSR.

Later on, basketball in Uruguay also confronted a rivalry in the form of rugby. Basketball has, however, enjoyed steady popularity in the country, a fact which has helped the Federación Uruguaya de Básquetbol in Spanish) to survive for more than 90 years.

Federico Slinger took over presidency of the federation in 1981; he remained in office for sixteen years, holding the record for the longest tenure as president of the Uruguayan Basketball Federation.

After the 2005 season, the "FUBB" announced that Uruguayan police had become considered an important ally in order to prevent violence among fans during or after professional basketball games in Uruguay.

== Presidents ==
A list of presidents of the Uruguayan Basketball Federation:

Period	Name
1915	Federico Crocker
1916	Orestes Volpe
1917	José Pigni
1918	José Rodríguez Pacios
1919	Héctor Danero
1922	Juan Lagomarsino
1930	Pablo Luis Perazzo
1934	Carlos Rivieri Podestá
1937	Héctor Paysse Reyes
1938	Raúl Blengio Salvo
1939	José Martinelli Gómez
1940	Hugo Méndez Schiaffino
1942	Ruano Fournier
1946	Juan Aldo Siccardi
1948	Hugo Méndez Schiaffino
1950	Francisco Figueroa Serantes
1951	José Chávez Miranda
1952	Francisco Figueroa Serantes
1955	Pablo Pesce Barceló
1957	Washington Fradiletti
1960	Justo J. Orozco
1964	Omar Freire
1965	Alberto Casal
1966	Alberto Rossello
1981	Federico Slinger
1997	Ernesto Pereyra
1998	Germán Paz
2002	Luis A. Castillo
2016	Ricardo Vairo (current president)

== Tournaments organized ==
=== Uruguayan Basketball League ===
The professional era Liga Uruguaya de Básquetbol (LUB; Uruguayan Basketball League) competition began in 2003.

=== Torneo Metropolitano ===
A list of Federación Torneo Metropolitano teams (2018):

- Bohemios
- Unión Atlética
- Tabaré
- Capitol
- Auriblanco
- Larrañaga
- Olivol Mundial
- Colón
- Stockolmo
- Miramar

=== Third division teams (DTA – Divisional Tercera de Ascenso) ===
A list of Federacion Uruguaya de Basketball Tercera de Ascenso (3rd division) teams (2018):

- Marne
- Yale
- Reducto
- Capurro
- Montevideo
- Peñarol
- Danubio Fútbol Club
- San Telmo Rápido Sport
- Urupan
- Albatros
- Deportivo Paysandú

=== Other teams (2018) ===
- Cutcsa
- Cader
- Romis
- Romis Nelimar
- Guruyú Waston
- Anastasia
- Juventus
- Paysandú Wanderers
- Allavena
- Pelotaris
- Universitario
- Flores BBC
- Lagomar
- Lavalleja
- Maldonado
- Plaza NH
- Remeros

== Uruguayan Federal Basketball Championship ==
The Campeonato Uruguayo Federal de Básquetbol (Uruguayan Federal Basketball Championship) was founded in 1915, making it among the oldest basketball competitions on the South American continent. Until the Uruguayan Basketball League was created in 2003, the Montevideo clubs were playing in the Uruguayan Federal Basketball Championship, while the rest of the country's clubs played in regional tournaments. The Uruguayan basketball championships were only local, and no competition brought all of the clubs in the country together.

== See also ==
- FUBB All-Star Game
