= Peñarol (basketball) =

- Nickname: Carbonero; Manya; Mirasoles
- Leagues: LUB; BCL Americas
- Founded: 1931; 95 years ago
- Dissolved: 1997 (reaffiliated in 2018)
- History: Peñarol (1931–1997; 2018–present)
- Arena: Palacio Peñarol
- Capacity: 4,700
- Location: Montevideo, Uruguay
- Team colors
- President: Gastón Diz
- Head coach: Marcelo Signorelli
- Championships: 1 South American Club Championship; 6 Uruguayan Championships; 5 Winter Tournaments
- Website: peñarol.org/basquet
Home	Away

Club Atlético Peñarol Basketball, commonly known as simply Peñarol, is the senior men's basketball section of the Uruguayan sports club Peñarol, based in Montevideo. The team played in the Uruguayan Primera División, which was organized by the Uruguayan Basketball Federation, until the club was expelled in 1997.

After returning to official competitions in 2018, Peñarol currently plays in the LUB, the top division of Uruguayan basketball. Recently, Peñarol has also played in the Basketball Champions League Americas, the highest continental level. Over the club's history, they have won six Uruguayan Championships, as well as the South American Championship of Champions Clubs in 1983.

== History ==
Peñarol's basketball section dates back to the late 1920s. When Club Piratas was formed; in 1931, it became Peñarol. The club's first league game, which was in the fourth division of Uruguayan basketball, was played in 1940. By 1943, the team was playing in the Uruguayan top-tier level Federal Championship. The following year, Peñarol won the Federal Championship, a tournament including the best basketball teams in Montevideo. In 2003, the league changed its name to the LUB.

In 1945, Peñarol left the Uruguayan Basketball Federation, to play in a new league; the club rejoined the federation in 1947, when the upstart league failed. In 1952, Peñarol again won the Uruguayan Federal Championship. After a down period for the team (with relegation in 1968), Peñarol won the Uruguayan Federal Championship in 1973, 1978, 1979, and 1982. In 1983, the club also won the South American Championship of Champions Clubs, and thus qualified to play at the 1983 edition of the FIBA Intercontinental Cup. In 1985, the club was relegated, beginning a downward spiral, which ended with its expulsion from the Uruguayan Federal Championship in 1997.

Peñarol rejoined the Uruguayan Basketball Federation in 2018, competing in Uruguay's third-tier league, the DTA. In 2019, Peñarol won the Metropolitano championship, promoting to the top division, Liga Uruguaya (LUB), after beating Club Cordón in the finals.

== Arenas ==
Peñarol's home games are played at the 4,700 seat "Palacio Peñarol".

== Honours and titles ==
=== Continental ===
- South American Championship of Champions Clubs
  - Champions (1): 1983
  - Runners-up (1): 1974

=== National ===
- Uruguayan Championship
  - Champions (6): 1944, 1952, 1973, 1978, 1979, 1982
- Liga Uruguaya de Básquetbol
  - Runners-up (1): 2022
- First Division Winter Tournament
  - Champions (5): 1953, 1955, 1978, 1981, 1982

== Players ==
=== Current roster ===
As of 31 December 2023.

Note: Flags indicate national team, as has been defined under FIBA eligibility rules. Players may hold more than one non-FIBA nationality.

No.	Pos.	Nat.	Player
1	C	(Senegal) SEN	Malik Dime
2	F	(United States) USA	Jy'Lan Washington
3	PG	(Uruguay) URU	Juan Salvador Zanotta
6	SG	(Uruguay) URU	Ignacio Xavier
10	PF	(Uruguay) URU	Emiliano Serres
11	PG	(Uruguay) URU	Jayson Granger
14	PF	(Puerto Rico) PUR	Alexander Kappos
18	PF	(Uruguay) URU	Roodvan Osores
20	F	(Uruguay) URU	Joaquín Rodríguez
23	C	(Uruguay) URU	Marcelo Rosas
41	C	(Uruguay) URU	Nicolas Borsellino
75	SG	(Uruguay) URU	Juan Hernandez
