= Club Atlético Aguada =

Montevideo-based basketball

Aguada
- Nickname: Aguatero; Rojiverde
- Leagues: LUB
- Founded: 19 February 1922; 104 years ago
- Arena: Estadio Club Atlético Aguada
- Capacity: 3,738
- President: Alejandro Mazzeo
- Head coach: Leandro Ramella
- Championships: 4 (2013, 2019, 2020, 2024)
- Website: Club website
Home	Away

Club Atlético Aguada, commonly known as simply Aguada, is a Uruguayan basketball team based in Montevideo. The club was established in February 1922. Aguada plays in the Liga Uruguaya de Basketball (LUB) and has won the championship three times.

== History ==
Due to the COVID-19 pandemic, the 2019–20 LUB season took place between October 2019 and February 2021. The season paused in March 2020, resumed in November 2020 briefly with the start of the playoffs, and then paused again until February 2021. The 2019–20 season finished on February 26, 2021, when Aguada was crowned champions with a 3–1 finals series victory over Trouville.

== Honours ==
Liga Uruguaya de Basketball

- Champions (4): 2012–13, 2018–19, 2019–20, 2023–24

== Players ==
=== Current roster ===
Note: Flags indicate national team eligibility at FIBA-sanctioned events. Players may hold other non-FIBA nationalities not displayed.

Club Atlético Aguada roster
Players
Coaches

Pos.	No.	Nat.	Name	Ht.	Age
G/F	1	(United States)	Adams, Jordan	1.96 m (6 ft 5 in)	32 – 8 July 1994
G	2	(United States)	Fuller, Kyle	1.84 m (6 ft 0 in)	34 – 27 January 1992
C	7	(Uruguay)	Metzger, Theo	2.00 m (6 ft 7 in)	27 – 2 June 1999
G	10	(Uruguay)	Stoll, Juan	1.84 m (6 ft 0 in)	22 – 15 March 2004
PG	13	(Uruguay)	Santiso, Juan	1.85 m (6 ft 1 in)	32 – 3 May 1994
F	14	(Uruguay)	Gentile, Agustin	1.93 m (6 ft 4 in)	23 – 22 March 2003
PG	21	(Uruguay)	Brun, Gabriel	1.75 m (5 ft 9 in)	22 – 13 December 2003
PF	23	(Argentina)	Cerminato, Leandro	2.01 m (6 ft 7 in)	28 – 9 June 1998
F/C	24	(Uruguay)	Zuvich, Agustin	2.01 m (6 ft 7 in)	30 – 21 August 1995
C	30	(Dominican Republic)	Vargas, Eloy	2.11 m (6 ft 11 in)	37 – 30 December 1988
SG	31	(Uruguay)	Medina, Facundo	1.90 m (6 ft 3 in)	31 – 22 November 1994
G	33	(United States)	Johnson, Orlando	1.93 m (6 ft 4 in)	37 – 11 March 1989
F	34	(United States)	Young, Anthony	2.00 m (6 ft 7 in)	36 – 10 December 1989
F	77	(Uruguay)	Silva, Lucas	1.97 m (6 ft 6 in)	23 – 25 October 2002
PG	88	(Uruguay)	Planells, Luciano	1.84 m (6 ft 0 in)	24 – 24 October 2001

Head coach

- (Uruguay) Leandro Ramella

Assistant coach(es)

- (Uruguay) Germán Cortizas
- (Uruguay) Imanol Hernández

Legend

- (C) Team captain
- Injured

- Roster
Updated: December 1, 2022

=== Depth chart ===
Pos.	Starting 5	Bench 1	Bench 2
C	Eloy Vargas	Theo Metzger	Juan Stoll
PF	Leandro Cerminato	Agustin Zuvich	Lucas Silva
SF	Jordan Adams	Anthony Young	Agustin Gentile
SG	Orlando Johnson	Facundo Medina	Kyle Fuller
PG	Juan Santiso	Luciano Planells	Gabriel Brun

=== Individual awards ===
Liga Uruguaya de Básquetbol MVP

- Leandro García Morales – 2013
- Andrew Freeley - 2019
- Dwayne Davis – 2020
