= Club Biguá de Villa Biarritz =

Biguá
- Nickname: El Pato (The Duck)
- Leagues: Liga Uruguaya
- Founded: 14 April 1931; 93 years ago
- History: Club Biguá de Villa Biarritz; 1931–present
- Arena: Villa Biarritz
- Capacity: 1,200
- Location: Montevideo, Uruguay
- President: Tomás Wahrmann
- Head coach: Alvaro Tito
- Website: biguabasket.com
| Uniform | Uniform |

Club Biguá de Villa Biarritz, better known as simply Biguá, is a Uruguayan professional basketball team that is based in Montevideo. The team currently plays in the Uruguayan Basketball League. The men's basketball section is a part of a multi-sports club, which offers a wide variety of different sports. The multi-sports club was founded in 1931, after "Biguá" and "Club Biarritz" merged to form "Club Biguá de Villa Biarritz".

Biguá has won seven national titles: 3 Uruguayan Federal Championships and 4 Uruguayan Basketball League titles.

== History ==
In its history in domestic competitions, Biguá's basketball club won 3 Federal Championships (Uruguay's most important club tournament until 2003) in 1988, 1989 and 1990, 3 Liga Uruguaya de Básquet titles (the current version of the top-tier level Uruguayan basketball league) in 2007, 2008 and 2021, and the Torneo Super 4 title in 2008.

In international competitions, Biguá won 2 South American Club Championships, in 1992 and 2008. The club was also the runner-up in the 2022 edition of the FIBA Champions League Americas.

== Honours and titles ==
=== National honors ===
- Uruguayan Federal Championship

Champions (3): 1988, 1989, 1990

- Uruguayan Basketball League

Champions (4): 2007–08, 2008–09, 2021, 2022

- Torneo Super 4

Winners (1): 2008

=== International honors ===
- South American Club Championship

Champions (2): 1992, 2008

- FIBA Champions League Americas

Runners-up (1): 2022

=== Current roster ===
Note: Flags indicate national team eligibility at FIBA-sanctioned events. Players may hold other non-FIBA nationalities not displayed.

Club Biguá de Villa Biarritz roster
Players
Coaches

| Pos. | No. | Nat. | Name | Ht. | Wt. | Age |
|---|---|---|---|---|---|---|
| PF | 0 | (Uruguay) | Álvarez, Gonzalo | 1.98 m (6 ft 6 in) | 105 kg (231 lb) |
| F/C | 1 | (United States) | Rudd, Victor | 2.06 m (6 ft 9 in) | 100 kg (220 lb) |
| PF | 3 | (Uruguay) | Moglia, Santiago | 1.96 m (6 ft 5 in) | 90 kg (198 lb) |
| G | 4 | (Uruguay) | Vidal, Santiago | 1.80 m (5 ft 11 in) | 79 kg (174 lb) |
| SG | 7 | (Uruguay) | Loriente, Iván | 1.90 m (6 ft 3 in) | 88 kg (194 lb) |
| PG | 8 | (United States) | Sims, Donald | 1.90 m (6 ft 3 in) | 77 kg (170 lb) |
| G | 12 | (Uruguay) | Espinosa, Matías | 1.86 m (6 ft 1 in) | 82 kg (181 lb) |
| SF | 15 | (Uruguay) | Jones, Guillermo | 1.90 m (6 ft 3 in) | 82 kg (181 lb) |
| F | 17 | (Uruguay) | Arevalo, Ángel | 1.95 m (6 ft 5 in) | 90 kg (198 lb) |
| C | 23 | (Dominican Republic) | Santos, Luís | 2.03 m (6 ft 8 in) | 116 kg (256 lb) |
| F | 25 | (Uruguay) | Fernández, Guillermo | 1.92 m (6 ft 4 in) | 88 kg (194 lb) |
| PG | 26 | (Uruguay) | Saavedra, Manuel | 1.85 m (6 ft 1 in) | 85 kg (187 lb) |
| F | 42 | (Uruguay) | Rojas, Martín | 1.95 m (6 ft 5 in) | 93 kg (205 lb) |
| F | 50 | (Uruguay) | Montañez, Felipe | 1.98 m (6 ft 6 in) | 90 kg (198 lb) |

Head coach

- (Uruguay) Diego Cal

Assistant coach(es)

- (Uruguay) Nicolás Mazzarino

Legend

- (C) Team captain
- (I) Import player
- Injured

- Roster
Updated: October 5, 2022

== Head coaches ==
| Name | Nationality. | Períod |
|---|---|---|
| Víctor Hugo Berardi | Uruguay | 1988–1992 |
| Javier Espíndola | Uruguay | 1993 |
| Alejandro Gava | Uruguay | 1995 |
| Rubens Valenzuela | Uruguay | 1995–1996 |
| Enrique Perreta | Uruguay | 1997 |
| Víctor Hugo Berardi | Uruguay | 1998 |
| Enrique Perreta | Uruguay | 1998 |
| Horacio Perdomo | Uruguay | 1999–2000 |
| Francisco Bolaña | Uruguay | 2000–2002 |
| Alvaro Tito | Uruguay | 2002–2003 |
| Edgardo Kogan | Uruguay | 2004–2005 |
| Víctor Hugo Berardi | Uruguay | 2005 |
| Alvaro Tito | Uruguay | 2006 |
| Marcelo Signorelli | Uruguay | 2007 |
| Alejandro Alvarez | Uruguay | 2008 |
| Che García | Argentina | 2008–2009 |
| Alejandro Alvarez | Uruguay | 2009–2010 |
| Edgardo Kogan | Uruguay | 2010 |
| Juan Carlos Werstein | Uruguay | 2010 |
| Guillermo Narvarte | Argentina | 2011 |
| Alvaro Tito | Uruguay | 2011–2012 |
