= Hebraica Macabi =

- Nickname: Macabeo
- Leagues: Liga Uruguaya de Basketball; FIBA Americas League
- Founded: 25 May 1939; 86 years ago
- Arena: Camacuá
- Location: Montevideo, Uruguay
- President: Jaime Apoj
- Head coach: Leonardo Zylberstein
- Championships: 4 Uruguayan Championships
- Website: www.hebraicamacabi.com
Home	Away

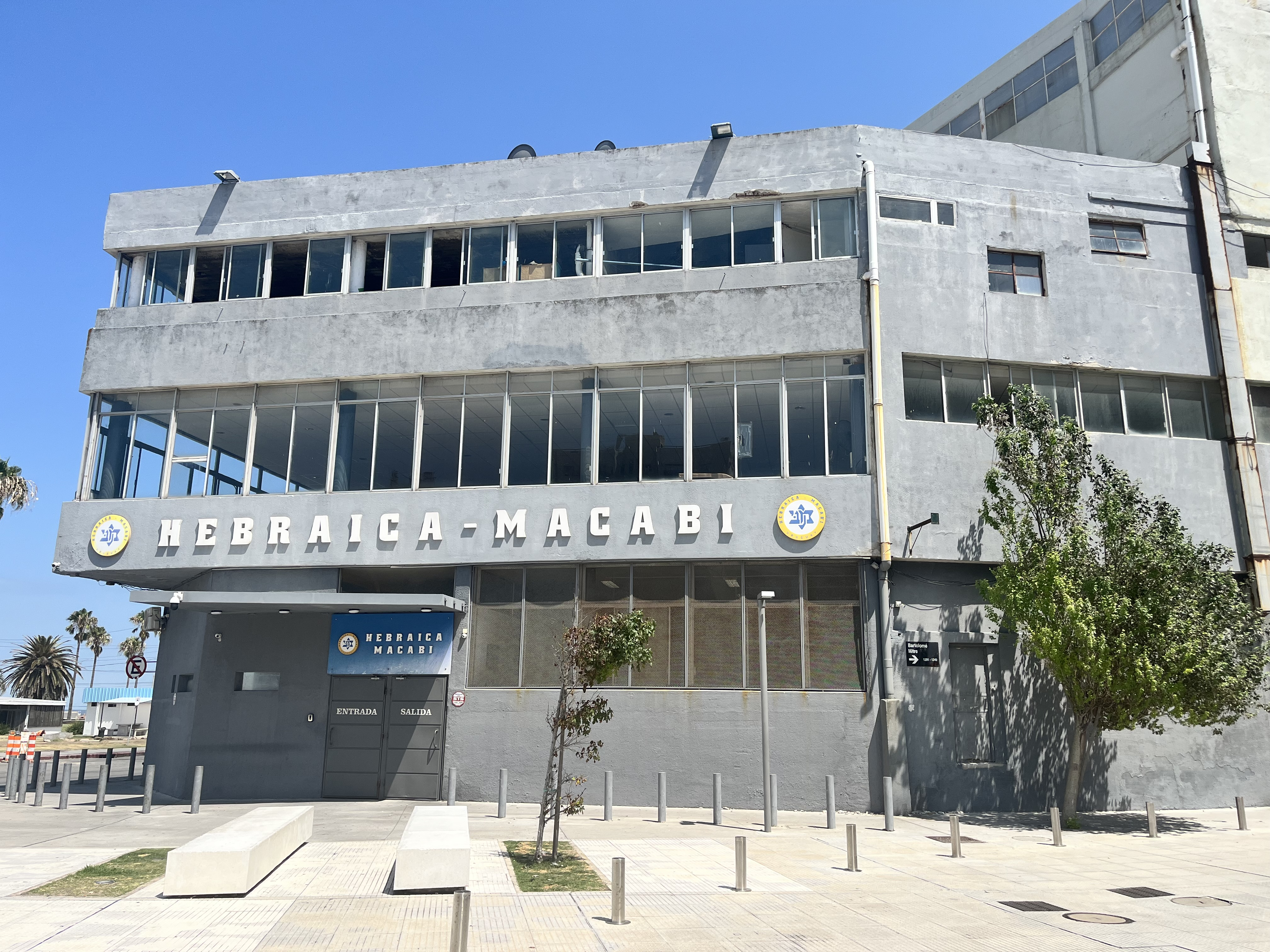
Headquarters of Hebraica Macabi

Asociación Hebraica y Macabi del Uruguay, commonly known as Hebraica Macabi, is a Uruguayan sports club based in Montevideo. Founded in 1939 by members of the local Jewish community, it is widely regarded as one of its main institutional representatives. The club is known of its professional basketball team which plays in the Liga Uruguaya de Basketball, the nation's top-tier league.

During the first cycle, the name used by the club was Macabi Hacoaj, later changing its name to the current one. Hebraica has won four national championships, in 2012, 2016, 2017 and 2023.

== History ==
The present-day Hebraica y Macabi originated in March 1963, following the merger of Club Deportivo Macabi Hacoaj Uruguay, founded on 25 May 1939, and the Asociación Hebraica del Uruguay, established in August 1944. In July 1964, the club was established in a building located in the southern part of the Ciudad Vieja neighbourhood of Montevideo. In December 1966, the National Council of Government approved its statutes and granted the new institution legal status.

Macabi was promoted to the Second Division of Uruguay Basketball in 1972 and to the First Division in 1973, winning three federal tournaments (Uruguay's most important tournament until 2000). The team retired from Uruguayan basketball in 1997, but then returned in 2004 to the Third Division. Obtaining two promotions over three years, Hebraica y Macabi played in 2007–08 on the Liga Uruguaya de Basketball, Uruguay's most important tournament, obtaining second place.

Macabi won its first national championship during the 2011–12 edition of the Liga Uruguaya de Basketball.

== Honours ==
- Liga Uruguaya de Basketball
  - Winners (4): 2011–12, 2015–16, 2016–17, 2022-23
- Liga Metropolitana
  - Winners (1): 2006

=== International ===
- Basketball Champions League Americas
  - Fourth Place (1): 2023–24

== Current roster ==
Hebraica y Macabi roster
Players
Coaches

Pos.	No.	Nat.	Name	Ht.
SG	3	(Israel)	Gutt, Golan	1.90 m (6 ft 3 in)
PG	4	(Uruguay)	Asyzn, Joaquin	1.79 m (5 ft 10 in)
PF	5	(Uruguay)	Ducasse, Juan	2.06 m (6 ft 9 in)
F	9	(Uruguay)	Haller, Federico	2.00 m (6 ft 7 in)
SG	10	(Uruguay)	Garcia, Brian	1.80 m (5 ft 11 in)
F/C	11	(United States)	Hassell, Franklin	2.03 m (6 ft 8 in)
PG	13	(Uruguay)	Romero, Manuel	1.83 m (6 ft 0 in)
PG	21	(Uruguay)	Parodi, Luciano (C)	1.82 m (6 ft 0 in)
PG	23	(United States)	Williams, Jordan	1.98 m (6 ft 6 in)
PF	28	(Argentina)	Viatri, Lautaro	2.02 m (6 ft 8 in)
F	30	(Panama)	Oglivie, Ernesto	2.03 m (6 ft 8 in)
PG	35	(Uruguay)	Calimares, Santiago	1.87 m (6 ft 2 in)

Head coach

- (Uruguay) Leonardo Zylberstein

Assistant coach(es)

- (Uruguay) Alejandro Muro

Legend

- (C) Team captain
- Injured

- Roster
Updated: 2024-01-10
