= Liga Uruguaya de Básquetbol =

Most important basketball league in Uruguay

- Founded: 2003; 23 years ago
- First season: 2003
- Country: Uruguay
- Confederation: FIBA Americas
- Number of teams: 12
- Level on pyramid: 1
- Relegation to: Liga de Ascenso
- International cup(s): BCL Americas; Liga Sudamericana de Baloncesto
- Current champions: Peñarol (1st title) (2025–26)
- Most championships: Malvín (5 titles)
- President: (Uruguay) Sergio Benítez
- TV partners: Tenfield
- Website: www.fubb.org.uy
- 2025–26 LUB season

The Liga Uruguaya de Básquetbol (abbreviated as LUB; English: Uruguayan Basketball League) is the highest professional club basketball league in Uruguay. It is organized by the Uruguayan Basketball Federation (FUBB). The Uruguayan Basketball League competition began in 2003. Before that time, the Uruguayan basketball championships were only local metropolitan, and no competitions brought together all the clubs in the country. Until the Liga Uruguaya de Básquetbol was created, the capital clubs participated in the Campeonato Uruguayo Federal de Básquetbol (Uruguayan Federal Basketball Championship), while the clubs of the rest of the country competed in regional tournaments. The Uruguayan Federal Basketball Championship was founded in 1915, making it among the oldest on the continent.

The first LUB competition had a dramatic end, with a win in the last second, that brought the Uruguayan League title to Defensor Sporting, whom also repeated in the 2009–10 season. So far, Defensor Sporting is the only one to appear in all of the league's seasons, after the relegation of Trouville in the 2024–25 season.

== Format ==
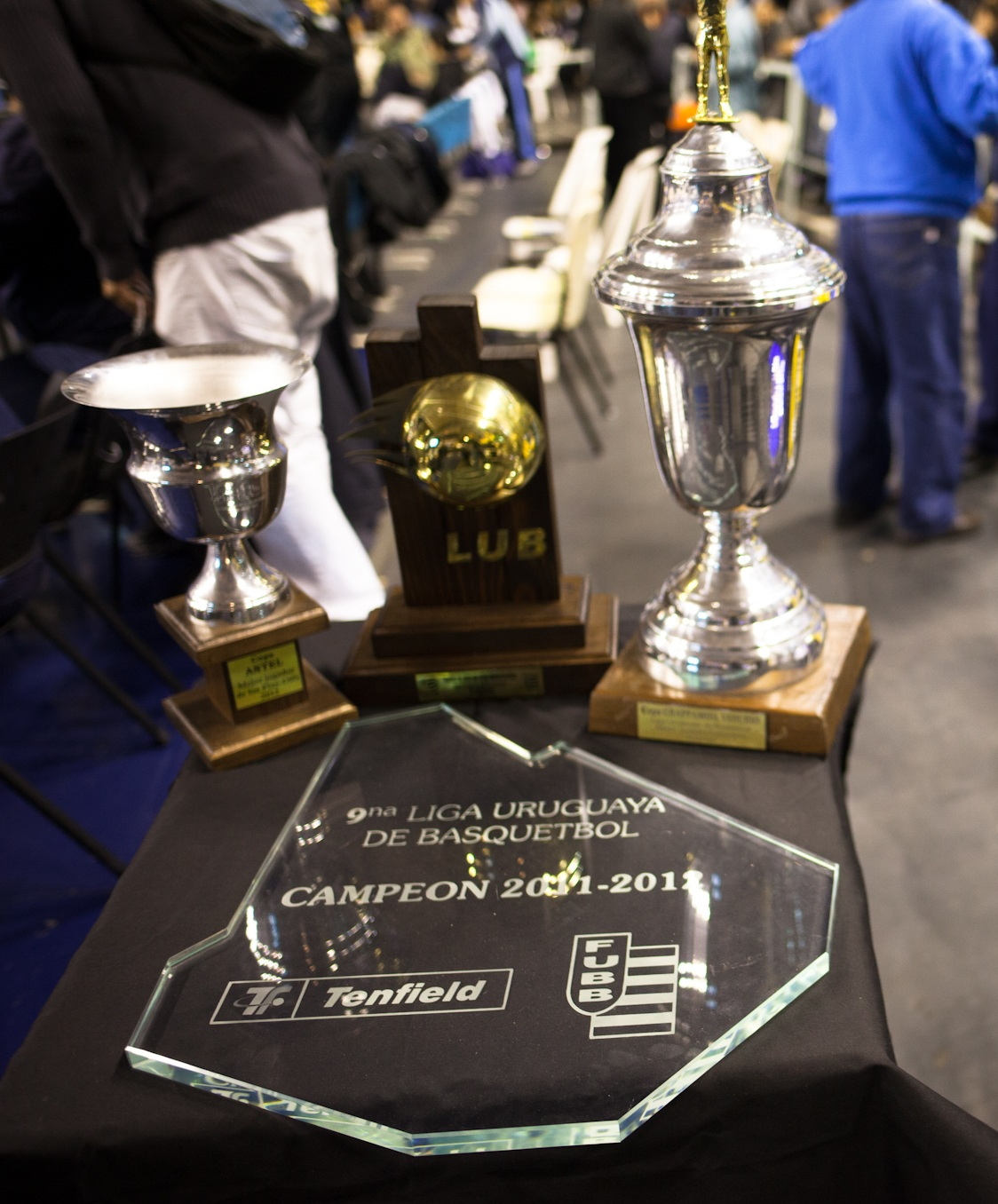
Trophies of the Uruguayan Basketball League.

The LUB is currently played in three stages: Torneo Clasificatorio (Qualifying Tournament), Fase Campeonato (Championship Phase) or Reclasificatorio (Requalifier), play-in and play-off.

- In the Qualifying Tournament, the clubs play each other twice, home and away, and the first six of the table play in the Championship Phase, where all is guaranteed to participate in the playoffs. The last six play the Requalifier.
- The Championship Phase is contested by six teams. The clubs play each other twice, home and away. It only serves to organize the positions for playoffs.
- The Requalifier was contested by six teams also. The clubs play each other twice. The last two are relegated to the Liga de Ascenso and the top two advance to the playoffs.
- Finally, teams competed in the playoffs, with series being best of five. The first stage was the quarterfinals. The qualifiers are played as: A) 1st of the Liguilla vs. 2nd of the Reclasificatorio, B) 2nd of the Liguilla vs. 1st of the Requalifier, C) 3rd of the Liguilla vs. 6th of the Liguilla, and D) 4th of the Liguilla vs. 5th of the Liguilla. The semifinal pairings were: A) Winner vs. D) Winner and B) Winner vs. C) Winner. The winners of these matches played in the finals in best-of-seven serie, with the winner being crowned as the league champions of the LUB.
- The finalists will play the BCL Americas and the losers of the semifinals, the Liga Sudamericana de Baloncesto.

== Participating teams ==
Defensor Sporting is the team with the most league appearances, having so far competed in every season of the LUB.

=== 2026–27 season teams ===
Notes: All statistics are only for the Uruguayan Basketball League (Liga Uruguaya de Básquetbol), which is organized by the Uruguayan Basketball Federation (Federación Uruguaya de Basketball). Uruguayan Federal tournaments are not included. The "arena" column reflects the arena where the team plays most of its home games, but does not indicate that the team in question is the owner.

Club	City	Arena	Capacity	Foundation	Seasons	Championships
Aguada	Montevideo	Estadio Propio Aguatero	3,738	1922	23	4
Atenas	Montevideo	Estadio Antonio María Borderes	1,565	1918	11	0
Biguá	Montevideo	Gimnasio Biguá de Villa Biarritz	1,200	1931	23	4
Defensor Sporting	Montevideo	Gimnasio Óscar Magurno	800	1910	24	2
Goes	Montevideo	Estadio Plaza de las Misiones	1,800	1934	15	0
Hebraica Macabi	Montevideo	Estadio Romeo Schinka	900	1939	19	4
Larrañaga	Montevideo	Gimnasio Doña Natividad Rivera	500	1939	1	0
Malvín	Montevideo	Gimnasio Juan Francisco Canil	900	1938	23	5
Nacional	Montevideo	Polideportivo del Gran Parque Central	800	1899	12	1
Peñarol	Montevideo	Estadio Cr. Gastón Güelfi	4,700	1891	7	1
Unión Atlética	Montevideo	Gimnasio Unión Atlética	750	1924	13	0
Urunday Universitario	Montevideo	Gimnasio Urunday Universitario	700	1931	10	0

== Champions by season ==
The Uruguayan Basketball League competition began in 2003. Before that time, the Uruguayan Federal Championships were only local, and no competition brought together all the clubs in the country.

Due to the COVID-19 pandemic, the 2019–20 season took place between October 2019 and February 2021. The season paused in March 2020, resumed in November 2020 briefly with the start of the playoffs, and then paused again until February 2021. The 2019–20 season finished on February 26, 2021, when Aguada beat Trouville in Game 4 of the finals to win 3–1. The 2021 season began in March 2021 and ran through June 2021.

Season	Champion	Result	Runner-up	Champion Coach
2003	Defensor Sporting	3–2	Paysandú	(Uruguay) Gerardo Jauri
2004–05	Salto Uruguay	3–1	Paysandú	(Uruguay) Javier Espíndola
2005–06	Trouville	3–0	Aguada	(Uruguay) Alejandro González
2006–07	Malvín	3–1	Biguá	(Uruguay) Pablo López
2007–08	Biguá	3–0	Hebraica Macabi	(Uruguay) Marcelo Signorelli
2008–09	Biguá	3–0	Defensor Sporting	(Argentina) Che García
2009–10	Defensor Sporting	3–0	Malvín	(Uruguay) Gerardo Jauri
2010–11	Malvín	3–1	Biguá	(Uruguay) Pablo López
2011–12	Hebraica Macabi	3–2	Malvín	(Uruguay) Marcelo Signorelli
2012–13	Aguada	4–3	Defensor Sporting	(Uruguay) Javier Espíndola
2013–14	Malvín	4–1	Defensor Sporting	(Uruguay) Pablo López
2014–15	Malvín	4–1	Trouville	(Uruguay) Pablo López
2015–16	Hebraica Macabi	4–2	Defensor Sporting	(Uruguay) Leonardo Zylbersztein
2016–17	Hebraica Macabi	4–3	Aguada	(Uruguay) Leonardo Zylbersztein
2017–18	Malvín	4–3	Aguada	(Uruguay) Pablo López
2018–19	Aguada	4–3	Malvín	(Uruguay) Miguel Volcan
2019–20	Aguada	3–1	Trouville	(Argentina) Adrián Capelli
2021	Biguá	3–2	Nacional	(Argentina) Hernán Laginestra
2021–22	Biguá	4–1	Peñarol	(Uruguay) Diego Cal
2022–23	Hebraica Macabi	4–2	Nacional	(Uruguay) Leonardo Zylbersztein
2023–24	Aguada	4–1	Peñarol	(Uruguay) Germán Cortizas
2024–25	Nacional	4–3	Aguada	(Uruguay) Álvaro Ponce
2025–26	Peñarol	4–2	Aguada	(Uruguay) Leandro García Morales

== Total LUB titles by club ==
Club	Championships	Runners-up	Year(s) won
Malvín	5	3	2007, 2011, 2014, 2015, 2018
Aguada	4	3	2013, 2019, 2020, 2024
Biguá	4	2	2008, 2009, 2021, 2022
Hebraica Macabi	4	1	2012, 2016, 2017, 2023
Defensor Sporting	2	4	2003, 2010
Peñarol	1	2	2026
Nacional	1	2	2025
Trouville	1	2	2006
Salto Uruguay	1	0	2005
Paysandú	0	2	

== Top Scorer ==
Season	Player	Club	Points
2014–15	(United States) Anthony Young	Montevideo	22.5
2015–16	(United States) Marcus Elliott	Olimpia	24.1
2016–17	(United States) Anthony Young (2)	Larre Borges	25.7
2017–18	(United States) Walter Baxley	Biguá	25.9
2018–19	(United States) Joe Efese	Verdirrojo	21.2
2019–20	(Puerto Rico) Isaac Sosa	Defensor Sporting	23.3
2021	(United States) Donald Sims	Biguá	26.7
2021–22	(United States) Davaunta Thomas	Capitol	22.8
2022–23	(United States) Donald Sims (2)	Biguá	24.1
2023–24	(United States) Donald Sims (3)	Aguada	23.8
2024–25	(Armenia) Andre Spight	Biguá	23.7
2025–26	(United States) Rashad Hassan	Montevideo	19.6

== See also ==
- Uruguayan Federal Basketball Championship (1915–2003)
- Liga Femenina de Básquetbol
- Uruguayan Basketball Champions
- Uruguayan Basketball Federation (FUBB)
- FUBB All-Star Game
