= 2016 South American Basketball Championship squads =

This article displays the rosters for the participating teams at the 2016 South American Basketball Championship. The player ages are as of June 26, which was the first day of the tournament.

== Group A ==
=== Bolivia ===
Bolivia men's national basketball team roster
Players
Coaches

Pos.	No.	Name	Age – Date of birth	Height	Club	Ctr.
C	4	Raul Salvatierra	24 – 15 July 1991	2.00 m (6 ft 7 in)	Caza y Pesca	(Bolivia)
F	5	Carlos Romero	32 – 20 May 1984	1.81 m (5 ft 11 in)	Pichincha	(Bolivia)
SG	6	Victor Fernandez	38 – 17 December 1977	1.83 m (6 ft 0 in)	La Salle Tarija	(Bolivia)
C	7	Cristhian Camargo	23 – 14 November 1992	1.94 m (6 ft 4 in)	UMSS	(Bolivia)
G	8	Paolo Ramos	28 – 31 August 1987	1.88 m (6 ft 2 in)	Universidad SC	(Bolivia)
F	9	Miguel Justiniano	35 – 27 August 1980	1.93 m (6 ft 4 in)	Amistad	(Bolivia)
G	10	Ronald Arze	23 – 22 June 1993	1.75 m (5 ft 9 in)	La Salle Olympic	(Bolivia)
G	11	Axel Veizaga	19 – 28 June 1996	1.82 m (6 ft 0 in)	UMSS	(Bolivia)
PF	12	Rene Calvo	23 – 19 May 1993	1.93 m (6 ft 4 in)	Pichincha	(Bolivia)
F	13	Diego Olguin	21 – 26 April 1995	1.86 m (6 ft 1 in)	UMSS	(Bolivia)
C	14	Luis Mercado	18 – 21 November 1997	2.06 m (6 ft 9 in)	Atletico Lanus	(Bolivia)
F	15	Martin Ochoa	21 – 18 November 1994	1.86 m (6 ft 1 in)	La Salle Tarija	(Bolivia)

Legend

- Club – describes last
  club before the tournament
- Age – describes age
  on 26 June 2016

=== Ecuador ===
Ecuador men's national basketball team roster
Players
Coaches

Pos.	No.	Name	Age – Date of birth	Height	Club	Ctr.
G	4	Luis Riascos	16 – 29 March 2000	1.94 m (6 ft 4 in)	Halcones	(Colombia)
PG	5	Christian Orozco	22 – 24 April 1994	1.85 m (6 ft 1 in)	U.T.E	(Ecuador)
PF	6	Alexander Guerra	20 – 24 January 1996	1.96 m (6 ft 5 in)	Juvenil
PG	7	Paul Cano	30 – 11 May 1986	1.70 m (5 ft 7 in)	Comunikt	(Ecuador)
C	8	Carlos Delgado	26 – 21 March 1990	2.02 m (6 ft 8 in)	Comunikt	(Ecuador)
F	9	Martin Martinez	20 – 7 October 1995	1.82 m (6 ft 0 in)	CKT
G	10	William Guayaquil	23 – 27 April 1993	1.85 m (6 ft 1 in)	U.T.E	(Ecuador)
F	11	Jonathan Arboleda	21 – 26 February 1995	1.90 m (6 ft 3 in)	H.R. Portviejo
PF	12	Erick Cobena	19 – 13 September 1996	1.94 m (6 ft 4 in)	H.R. Portviejo
PF	13	Nixon Mina	26 – 16 January 1990	2.05 m (6 ft 9 in)	Importadora Alvarado	(Ecuador)
C	14	Eduard Caicedo	25 – 26 November 1990	1.98 m (6 ft 6 in)	U.T.E	(Ecuador)
C	15	Carlos Carcelen	35 – 29 May 1981	2.01 m (6 ft 7 in)	U.T.E	(Ecuador)

Head coach

- (Argentina) Luciano Martinez

Legend

- Club – describes last
  club before the tournament
- Age – describes age
  on 26 June 2016

=== Paraguay ===
Paraguay men's national basketball team roster
Players
Coaches

Pos.	No.	Name	Age – Date of birth	Height	Club
PF	4	Gabriel Peralta	21 – 21 April 1995	2.01 m (6 ft 7 in)	Deportivo Viedma	(Argentina)
G/F	5	Daniel Pérez	31 – 13 August 1984	1.90 m (6 ft 3 in)	Club Libertad	(Paraguay)
G	6	Carlos Luis Vallejos	24 – 30 January 1992	1.83 m (6 ft 0 in)	Club Libertad	(Paraguay)
SF	7	Bruno Zanotti	33 – 13 September 1982	1.98 m (6 ft 6 in)	Club Libertad	(Paraguay)
SF	8	Edgar Riveros	25 – 2 April 1991	1.84 m (6 ft 0 in)	Sportivo Obreros de Pilar	(Paraguay)
G/F	9	Federico Mellone	31 – 20 January 1985	1.93 m (6 ft 4 in)	Cerro Porteño	(Paraguay)
F	10	Ramón Sánchez	24 – 1 October 1991	1.94 m (6 ft 4 in)	Cerro Porteño	(Paraguay)
F	11	Diego Bareiro	24 – 7 September 1991	1.95 m (6 ft 5 in)	Club Libertad	(Paraguay)
F	12	José Fabio	38 – 31 December 1977	2.00 m (6 ft 7 in)	Comunicaciones de Corrientes	(Argentina)
PG	13	Alejandro Peralta	25 – 17 April 1991	1.93 m (6 ft 4 in)	Deportivo San José	(Paraguay)
F	14	Robertro Latraro	32 – 7 December 1983	1.95 m (6 ft 5 in)	Club Libertad	(Paraguay)
F	15	Adolfo López	27 – 7 May 1989	1.99 m (6 ft 6 in)	Club Félix Pérez Cardozo	(Paraguay)

Head coach

- (Argentina) Eduardo Pfleger

Assistant coach(es)

- (Paraguay) Christian Viveros

Legend

- Club – describes last
  club before the tournament
- Age – describes age
  on 26 July 2016

== Group B ==
=== Chile ===
Chile men's national basketball team roster
Players
Coaches

Pos.	No.	Name	Age – Date of birth	Height	Club	Ctr.
PG	4	Tomas Alvarez	26 – 21 July 1989	1.86 m (6 ft 1 in)	Leones de Quilpue	(Chile)
PF	5	Ignacio Carrion	22 – 6 October 1993	2.01 m (6 ft 7 in)	Leones de Quilpue	(Chile)
PG	6	Pablo Coro	26 – 19 April 1990	1.85 m (6 ft 1 in)	CD Valdivia	(Chile)
SF	7	Sebastian Herrera	18 – 1 November 1997	1.89 m (6 ft 2 in)	Gladiators Trier	(Germany)
F	8	Carlos Aranda	24 – 8 March 1992	1.90 m (6 ft 3 in)	Club Deportes Las Animas	(Chile)
G	9	Erik Carrasco	33 – 18 May 1983	1.80 m (5 ft 11 in)	CD Valdivia	(Chile)
F	10	Sebastian Suarez	25 – 1 March 1991	1.85 m (6 ft 1 in)	CD Valdivia	(Chile)
C	11	Cristobal Infante	27 – 15 December 1988	1.92 m (6 ft 4 in)	Asociacion Basquetbol Ancud	(Chile)
PF	12	Gerardo Isla	25 – 9 May 1991	1.98 m (6 ft 6 in)	CD Valdivia	(Chile)
G	12	Fernando Schuler	25 – 26 January 1991	1.75 m (5 ft 9 in)	Colo Colo Santiago	(Chile)
C	14	Nicolas Carvacho	19 – 24 January 1997	2.08 m (6 ft 10 in)	Colorado State Rams men's basketball	(United States)
C	15	Juan Fontena	29 – 15 February 1987	1.95 m (6 ft 5 in)	Deportes Castro	(Chile)

Head coach

- (Argentina) Daniel Frola

Legend

- Club – describes last
  club before the tournament
- Age – describes age
  on 26 June 2016

=== Colombia ===
Colombia men's national basketball team roster
Players
Coaches

Pos.	No.	Name	Age – Date of birth	Height	Club	Ctr.
PG	4	Rodrigo Caicedo	28 – 27 February 1988	1.78 m (5 ft 10 in)	Cimarrones de Choco	(Colombia)
SG	5	Jorge Salazar	22 – 10 December 1993	1.74 m (5 ft 9 in)	Bucaros	(Colombia)
PF	6	Yildon Mendoza	19 – 8 September 1996	2.06 m (6 ft 9 in)	High School JUCO	(United States)
PF	7	Andre Ibarguen	19 – 14 December 1996	2.00 m (6 ft 7 in)	High School JUCO	(United States)
F	8	Michaell Jackson	28 – 11 July 1987	1.91 m (6 ft 3 in)	Bucaros	(Colombia)
SF	9	Stalin Ortiz	35 – 8 February 1981	1.91 m (6 ft 3 in)	Condores	(Colombia)
G	10	Hansel Atencia	19 – 24 May 1997	1.78 m (5 ft 10 in)	Liberty Flames basketball	(United States)
C	11	Michael Hinestroza	25 – 16 July 1990	2.06 m (6 ft 9 in)	Academia de la Montaña	(Colombia)
C	12	Divier Perez	27 – 14 April 1989	2.04 m (6 ft 8 in)	Academia de la Montaña	(Colombia)
F	13	Yesid Mosquera	19 – 19 November 1996	1.92 m (6 ft 4 in)	Furman Paladins men's basketball	(United States)
C	14	John Hernandez	32 – 6 January 1984	2.06 m (6 ft 9 in)	Sabios	(Colombia)
F	15	Jhan Mejia	22 – 15 June 1994	2.06 m (6 ft 9 in)	NE Oklahoma A&M CC	(United States)

Head coach

- (Colombia) Guillermo Moreno

Assistant coach(es)

- (Colombia) Tomas Diaz

Legend

- Club – describes last
  club before the tournament
- Age – describes age
  on 26 June 2016

=== Peru ===
Peru men's national basketball team roster
Players
Coaches

Pos.	No.	Name	Age – Date of birth	Height	Club	Ctr.
G	4	Jose Lopez Alva	26 – 5 January 1990	1.84 m (6 ft 0 in)	Regatas Lima	(Peru)
C	5	Julio Regalado	22 – 11 June 1994	2.04 m (6 ft 8 in)	Real Club	(Peru)
PG	6	Luis Barrios	25 – 21 September 1990	1.83 m (6 ft 0 in)	Faraday Club	(Peru)
C	7	Manuel Chavez	29 – 19 April 1987	2.02 m (6 ft 8 in)	Inmaculada	(Peru)
F	8	Alejandro Bellatin	26 – 21 January 1990	1.88 m (6 ft 2 in)	Regatas Lima	(Peru)
SF	9	Manuel Morales	28 – 28 December 1987	1.95 m (6 ft 5 in)	Regatas Lima	(Peru)
F	10	Martin La Rosa Peron	28 – 22 June 1988	1.91 m (6 ft 3 in)	Inmaculada	(Peru)
PG	11	Kyle Fuller	24 – 27 January 1992	1.83 m (6 ft 0 in)	Regatas Lima	(Peru)
PF	13	Carlos Cespedes	27 – 4 November 1988	1.96 m (6 ft 5 in)	Regatas Lima	(Peru)
C	14	Rodrigo Masias	35 – 11 March 1981	2.06 m (6 ft 9 in)	Regatas Lima	(Peru)
F	15	Angelo Parodi	27 – 24 May 1989	1.85 m (6 ft 1 in)	Real Club	(Peru)
F	17	Gianfranco Sambuceti	28 – 22 February 1988	1.82 m (6 ft 0 in)	Regatas Lima	(Peru)

Head coach

- (Paraguay) Carlos Zanelatto

Legend

- Club – describes last
  club before the tournament
- Age – describes age
  on 26 June 2016

=== Uruguay ===
Uruguay men's national basketball team roster
Players
Coaches

Pos.	No.	Name	Age – Date of birth	Height	Club	Ctr.
PG	5	Bruno Fitipaldo	24 – 2 August 1991	1.84 m (6 ft 0 in)	Obras Sanitarias	(Argentina)
SF	6	Mauricio Agular	33 – 3 February 1983	1.99 m (6 ft 6 in)	Defensor Sporting	(Uruguay)
PF	7	Mathias Calfani	24 – 21 January 1992	2.04 m (6 ft 8 in)	Malvin	(Uruguay)
G	9	Panchi Barrera	31 – 6 April 1985	1.94 m (6 ft 4 in)	Aguada	(Uruguay)
PF	12	Juan Ducasse	17 – 2 September 1998	2.04 m (6 ft 8 in)	Club Trouville	(Uruguay)
PF	13	Sebastian Vazquez	30 – 4 September 1985	1.95 m (6 ft 5 in)	Goes	(Uruguay)
C	15	Esteban Batista	32 – 2 September 1983	2.08 m (6 ft 10 in)	Olimpia Milano	(Italy)
PF	19	Frederico Haller	28 – 5 June 1988	1.98 m (6 ft 6 in)	Defensor Sporting	(Uruguay)
G	11	Luciano Parodi	22 – 16 February 1994	1.93 m (6 ft 4 in)	Hebraica Macabi	(Uruguay)
C	22	Reque Newsome	34 – 8 October 1981	2.03 m (6 ft 8 in)	Malvin	(Uruguay)
SF	24	Salvador Zanotta	21 – 25 March 1995	1.82 m (6 ft 0 in)	Hebraica Macabi	(Uruguay)
C	33	Kiril Wachsmann	31 – 12 November 1984	2.03 m (6 ft 8 in)	Defensor Sporting	(Uruguay)

Head coach

- (Uruguay) Marcelo Signorelli

Legend

- Club – describes last
  club before the tournament
- Age – describes age
  on 26 June 2016
