= Basketball at the 2015 Pan American Games – Men's team rosters =

This article shows the rosters of all participating teams at the men's basketball tournament at the 2015 Pan American Games in Toronto. Rosters could have a maximum of 12 athletes.

== Argentina ==
The Argentina men's national basketball team roster for the 2015 Pan American Games.

Argentina men's national basketball team – 2015 Pan American Games roster
Players
Coaches

Pos.	No.	Name	Age – Date of birth	Height	Club
G	4	Vildoza, Luca	19 – 11 Aug 1995	1.91 m (6 ft 3 in)	(Argentina) Quilmes
G	5	Richotti, Nicolas	28 – 17 Oct 1986	1.83 m (6 ft 0 in)	(Spain) CB Canarias
F	6	Mata, Marcos	28 – 1 Aug 1986	2.01 m (6 ft 7 in)	(Brazil) Franca
G	7	Campazzo, Facundo	24 – 23 Mar 1991	1.79 m (5 ft 10 in)	(Spain) Real Madrid
G	8	Laprovittola, Nicolas	25 – 31 Jan 1990	1.87 m (6 ft 2 in)	(Brazil) Flamengo
F	9	Brussino, Nicolas	22 – 2 Mar 1993	2.03 m (6 ft 8 in)	(Argentina) Regatas
F	10	Aguerre, Federico	26 – 23 Oct 1988	2.04 m (6 ft 8 in)	(Argentina) Atenas
C	11	Gallizzi, Tayavek	22 – 8 Feb 1993	2.04 m (6 ft 8 in)	(Argentina) Quilmes
C	12	Delia, Marcos	23 – 8 Apr 1992	2.09 m (6 ft 10 in)	(Argentina) Obras Sanitarias
C	13	Torres, Juan Manuel	31 – 24 Feb 1984	2.10 m (6 ft 11 in)	(Argentina) Atenas
F	14	Bortolin, Matias	22 – 11 Apr 1993	2.07 m (6 ft 9 in)	(Argentina) Atenas
F	15	Garino, Patricio	22 – 17 May 1993	1.98 m (6 ft 6 in)	(United States) George Washington

Head coach

- Hernandez, Sergio

Assistant coach(es)

- Santander, Silvio
- Casalanguida, Nicolas

Legend

- Age – as of 16 July 2015
- Club – before start of Games

== Brazil ==
The Brazil men's national basketball team roster for the 2015 Pan American Games.

Brazil men's national basketball team – 2015 Pan American Games roster
Players
Coaches

Pos.	No.	Name	Age – Date of birth	Height	Club
G	4	Fischer, Ricardo	24 – 16 May 1991	1.83 m (6 ft 0 in)	(Brazil) Bauru
G	5	Freire Luz, Rafael	23 – 11 Feb 1992	1.88 m (6 ft 2 in)	(Spain) Obradoiro
C	6	Lima, Augusto	23 – 17 Sep 1991	2.08 m (6 ft 10 in)	(Spain) UCAM Murcia
G	7	Taylor, Larry	34 – 3 Oct 1980	1.85 m (6 ft 1 in)	(Brazil) Mogi das Cruzes
F	8	Benite, Vítor	25 – 20 Feb 1990	1.90 m (6 ft 3 in)	(Brazil) CR Flamengo
F	10	Nascimento, Carlos	32 – 18 Apr 1983	2.03 m (6 ft 8 in)	(Brazil) CR Flamengo
C	11	Hettsheimeir, Rafael	29 – 16 Jun 1986	2.08 m (6 ft 10 in)	(Brazil) Bauru
C	12	Souza, Rafael	27 – 3 Jun 1988	2.09 m (6 ft 10 in)	(Brazil) Limeira
C	13	Batista, Joao Paulo	33 – 29 Oct 1981	2.05 m (6 ft 9 in)	(Brazil) CR Flamengo
F	14	Meindl, Leonardo	22 – 20 Mar 1993	2.00 m (6 ft 7 in)	(Brazil) Bauru
F	15	Toledo, Marcus	29 – 10 Jul 1986	2.03 m (6 ft 8 in)	(Brazil) Basquete Cearense

Head coach

- Magnano, Ruben

Assistant coach(es)

- Ferraciu, Demetrius
- Neto, Jose

Legend

- Age – as of 16 July 2015
- Club – before start of Games

== Canada ==
The Canada men's national basketball team roster for the 2015 Pan American Games.

Canada men's national basketball team – 2015 Pan American Games roster
Players
Coaches

Pos.	No.	Name	Age – Date of birth	Height	Club
G	4	Murray, Jamal	18 – 23 Feb 1997	1.96 m (6 ft 5 in)	(Canada) Athlete Institute
F	5	Cadougan, Junior	25 – 7 May 1990	1.85 m (6 ft 1 in)	(Italy) Sidigas Avellino
F	6	Ejim, Melvin	24 – 4 Mar 1991	1.98 m (6 ft 6 in)	(Italy) Pallacanestro Virtus
F	7	Nicholson, Andrew	25 – 8 Dec 1989	2.06 m (6 ft 9 in)	(United States) Orlando Magic
G	8	English, Carl	34 – 2 Feb 1981	1.96 m (6 ft 5 in)	(Greece) AEK Athens
F	9	Brooks, Dillon	19 – 22 Jan 1996	2.03 m (6 ft 8 in)	(United States) University of Oregon
F	10	Bennett, Anthony	22 – 14 Mar 1993	2.03 m (6 ft 8 in)	(United States) Minnesota Timberwolves
F	11	Doornekamp, Aaron	29 – 5 Dec 1985	1.98 m (6 ft 6 in)	(Germany) Fraport Skyliners
G	12	Heslip, Brady	25 – 19 Jun 1990	1.88 m (6 ft 2 in)	(Bosnia and Herzegovina) BC Igokea
G	13	Mullings, Daniel	23 – 26 Jul 1991	1.94 m (6 ft 4 in)	(United States) New Mexico State Univ
F	14	Wiltjer, Kyle	22 – 20 Oct 1992	2.08 m (6 ft 10 in)	(United States) Gonzaga University
C	15	Bhullar, Sim	22 – 2 Dec 1992	2.26 m (7 ft 5 in)	(United States) Sacramento Kings

Head coach

- Triano, Jay

Assistant coach(es)

- Vanterpool, David
- Smart, Dave Charles

Legend

- Age – as of 16 July 2015
- Club – before start of Games

== Dominican Republic ==
The Dominican Republic men's national basketball team roster for the 2015 Pan American Games.

Dominican Republic men's national basketball team – 2015 Pan American Games roster
Players
Coaches

Pos.	No.	Name	Age – Date of birth	Height	Club
SG	4	Dicent, Miguel	20 – 19 May 1995	1.91 m (6 ft 3 in)	(United States) Morehead State University
SG	5	Fortuna, Manuel	30 – 23 Mar 1985	1.88 m (6 ft 2 in)	(Dominican Republic) Leones de Santo Domingo
PG	6	Acosta, José	23 – 17 Jun 1992	1.85 m (6 ft 1 in)	(Colombia) Academia de la Montaña
SG	7	Mendoza, Rigoberto	23 – 6 Jul 1992	1.90 m (6 ft 3 in)	(Dominican Republic) Reales de La Vega
PF	8	Santana, Edward	35 – 20 May 1980	2.03 m (6 ft 8 in)	(Dominican Republic) Titanes del Distrito Nacional
SG	9	Feliz, Andrés	18 – 15 Jul 1997	1.83 m (6 ft 0 in)	(United States) West Oaks Academy
SG	10	Suero, Gerardo	26 – 20 Apr 1989	1.93 m (6 ft 4 in)	(Dominican Republic) Leones de Santo Domingo
PF	11	Guzmán, Elys	33 – 24 May 1982	2.04 m (6 ft 8 in)	(Dominican Republic) Soles de Santo Domingo Este
PF	12	Delgado, Ángel	20 – 20 Nov 1994	2.08 m (6 ft 10 in)	(United States) Seton Hall University
SG	13	Maye, James	34 – 29 Jan 1981	2.01 m (6 ft 7 in)	(Dominican Republic) Titanes del Distrito Nacional
G	14	Morillo, Nehemias	22 – 21 Aug 1992	1.96 m (6 ft 5 in)	(United States) University of South Florida
C	15	García, Juan Jose	26 – 22 Apr 1989	2.01 m (6 ft 7 in)	(Spain) CAI Zaragoza

Legend

- Age – as of 16 July 2015
- Club – before start of Games

== Mexico ==
The Mexico men's national basketball team roster for the 2015 Pan American Games.

Mexico men's national basketball team – 2015 Pan American Games roster
Players
Coaches

Pos.	No.	Name	Age – Date of birth	Height	Club
SF	4	González, Jesús	29 – 14 Jul 1986	1.95 m (6 ft 5 in)	(Mexico) Pioneros de Cancún
PF	5	Ramos, Marco	28 – 26 Feb 1987	2.00 m (6 ft 7 in)	(Mexico) Halcones Rojos Veracruz
C	6	Garibay, Edgar	25 – 5 Mar 1990	2.11 m (6 ft 11 in)	(Mexico) Gigantes del Estado de México
PG	7	Toussaint, Carlos	23 – 24 Oct 1991	1.82 m (6 ft 0 in)	(Mexico) Gigantes del Estado de México
C	8	López, Jesús	31 – 18 Dec 1983	2.05 m (6 ft 9 in)	(Mexico) Pioneros de Cancún
SG	9	Cruz, Francisco	25 – 3 Oct 1989	1.90 m (6 ft 3 in)	(Mexico) Halcones de Xalapa
PG	10	Girón, Gabriel	27 – 27 Feb 1988	1.92 m (6 ft 4 in)	(Mexico) Fuerza Regia
PG	11	Meza, Pedro	29 – 15 Oct 1985	1.92 m (6 ft 4 in)	(Mexico) Halcones de Xalapa
PF	12	Hernández, Héctor	30 – 15 Jun 1985	2.05 m (6 ft 9 in)	(Mexico) Pioneros de Quintana Roo
SG	13	Méndez-Valdez, Orlando	29 – 29 Apr 1986	1.83 m (6 ft 0 in)	(Mexico) Halcones de Xalapa
C	14	Zamora, Adrián	28 – 28 Oct 1986	2.06 m (6 ft 9 in)	(Mexico) Halcones Rojos Veracruz
C	15	Gutiérrez, Israel	22 – 15 Jan 1993	2.06 m (6 ft 9 in)	(Mexico) Halcones Rojos Veracruz

Head coach

(Spain) Sergio Valdeolmillos

Legend

- Age – as of 16 July 2015
- Club – before start of Games

== Puerto Rico ==
The Puerto Rico men's national basketball team roster for the 2015 Pan American Games.

Puerto Rico men's national basketball team – 2015 Pan American Games roster
Players
Coaches

Pos.	No.	Name	Age – Date of birth	Height	Club
C	4	Villafañe, Luis	34 – 21 Jun 1981	2.09 m (6 ft 10 in)	(Puerto Rico) Cangrejeros de Santurce
G	5	Barea, J. J.	31 – 26 Jun 1984	1.80 m (5 ft 11 in)	(United States) Dallas Mavericks
PF	6	Young, Kevin	25 – 24 Jun 1990	2.05 m (6 ft 9 in)	(Puerto Rico) Brujos de Guayama
SG	7	Mojica, Javier	30 – 31 Aug 1984	1.92 m (6 ft 4 in)	(Puerto Rico) Cangrejeros de Santurce
PF	8	Clavell, Gilberto	25 – 10 Aug 1989	2.00 m (6 ft 7 in)	(Finland) Kouvot
F	9	Collier, Devon	24 – 20 Jan 1991	2.04 m (6 ft 8 in)	(Israel) Bnei Herzliya
G	10	Ayuso, Elías Larry	38 – 27 Mar 1977	1.88 m (6 ft 2 in)	(Puerto Rico) Mets de Guaynabo
SF	11	Carmona, Alejandro	32 – 14 Jun 1983	1.94 m (6 ft 4 in)	(Puerto Rico) Brujos de Guayama
G	12	Browne, Gary	22 – 24 Mar 1993	1.85 m (6 ft 1 in)	(United States) West Virginia Mountaineers
G	13	De Jesús, Jezreel	24 – 5 May 1991	1.86 m (6 ft 1 in)	(Puerto Rico) Maratonistas de Coamo
PF	14	Clemente, Ramón	29 – 11 Dec 1985	1.98 m (6 ft 6 in)	(Argentina) Obras Sanitarias
F	15	Graham III, Paul	29 – 2 Dec 1985	1.96 m (6 ft 5 in)	(Puerto Rico) Piratas de Quebradillas

Head coach

(United States) Rick Pitino

Legend

- Age – as of 16 July 2015
- Club – before start of Games

== United States ==
The United States men's national basketball team roster for the 2015 Pan American Games.

United States men's national basketball team – 2015 Pan American Games roster
Players
Coaches

Pos.	No.	Name	Age – Date of birth	Height	Club
PG	4	Trimble, Melo	20 – 2 Feb 1995	1.91 m (6 ft 3 in)	(United States) Maryland
SG	5	Langford, Keith	31 – 15 Sep 1983	1.93 m (6 ft 4 in)	(Russia) UNICS Kazan
PG	6	Brown, Bobby	30 – 24 Sep 1984	1.88 m (6 ft 2 in)	(China) Dongguan Leopards
SG	7	Baker, Ron	22 – 30 Mar 1993	1.93 m (6 ft 4 in)	(United States) Wichita State
PG	8	Brogdon, Malcolm	22 – 11 Dec 1992	1.96 m (6 ft 5 in)	(United States) Virginia
SG	9	Valentine, Denzel	21 – 16 Nov 1993	1.93 m (6 ft 4 in)	(United States) Michigan State
PF	10	Long, Shawn	22 – 29 Jan 1993	2.06 m (6 ft 9 in)	(United States) Louisiana–Lafayette
PF	11	Randolph, Anthony	26 – 15 Jul 1989	2.11 m (6 ft 11 in)	(Russia) Lokomotiv Kuban
SG	12	Wilkins, Damien	35 – 11 Jan 1980	1.98 m (6 ft 6 in)	(Puerto Rico) Indios de Mayagüez
C	13	Tarczewski, Kaleb	22 – 26 May 1993	2.13 m (7 ft 0 in)	(United States) Arizona
SF	14	Prince, Taurean	21 – 22 Mar 1994	2.01 m (6 ft 7 in)	(United States) Baylor
C	15	Hollins, Ryan	30 – 10 Oct 1984	2.13 m (7 ft 0 in)	(United States) Sacramento Kings

Head coach

(United States) Mark Few

Legend

- Age – as of 16 July 2015
- Club – before start of Games

== Venezuela ==
The Venezuela men's national basketball team roster for the 2015 Pan American Games.

Venezuela men's national basketball team – 2015 Pan American Games roster
Players
Coaches

Pos.	No.	Name	Age – Date of birth	Height	Club
C	0	Echenique, Gregory	24 – 23 Nov 1990	2.08 m (6 ft 10 in)	(Venezuela) Guaros de Lara
C	4	Marriaga, Miguel	31 – 6 Jun 1984	2.08 m (6 ft 10 in)	(Venezuela) Toros de Aragua
PG	5	Vargas, Gregory	29 – 18 Feb 1986	1.82 m (6 ft 0 in)	(Israel) Maccabi Haifa
SG	6	Cox, John	34 – 6 Jul 1981	1.96 m (6 ft 5 in)	(France) STB Le Havre
SF	7	Zamora, Jhornan	26 – 30 Jan 1989	1.93 m (6 ft 4 in)	(Paraguay) Club Sol de América
PG	8	Cubillán, David	27 – 27 Jul 1987	1.83 m (6 ft 0 in)	(Venezuela) Trotamundos de Carabobo
SF	10	Vargas, José Gregorio	33 – 23 Jan 1982	1.95 m (6 ft 5 in)	(Venezuela) Marinos de Anzoátegui
PF	11	Bethelmy, Luis	28 – 14 Oct 1986	2.03 m (6 ft 8 in)	(Venezuela) Guaros de Lara
PF	15	Ruiz, Miguel	24 – 10 Dec 1990	2.02 m (6 ft 8 in)	(Venezuela) Trotamundos de Carabobo
PG	19	Guillent, Heissler	28 – 17 Dec 1986	1.86 m (6 ft 1 in)	(Venezuela) Guaros de Lara
SG	20	Lewis, Dwight	27 – 7 Oct 1987	1.98 m (6 ft 6 in)	(Venezuela) Trotamundos de Carabobo
PF	43	Colmenares, Néstor	27 – 5 Sep 1987	2.03 m (6 ft 8 in)	(Venezuela) Cocodrilos de Caracas

Head coach

(Argentina) Néstor García

Legend

- Age – as of 16 July 2015
- Club – before start of Games
