= Basketball at the 2015 Pan American Games – Men's tournament =

Tournament details
- Host country: Canada
- Dates: July 21 – 25
- Teams: 8 (from 1 federation)
- Venue: 1 (in 1 host city)

Final positions
- Champions: Brazil (6th title)

The men's basketball tournament at the 2015 Pan American Games was held in Toronto, Canada at the Ryerson Athletic Centre from July 21 to 25.

For these Games, the men competed in an 8-team tournament. The teams were grouped into two pools of four teams each for a round-robin preliminary round. The top two teams in each group will advance to a single elimination bracket.

Puerto Rico are the defending champions from the 2011 Pan American Games in Guadalajara, defeating Mexico, 74–72 in the final.

The official detailed schedule for the tournament was announced on February 5, 2015.

== Qualification ==
A total of eight men's teams qualified to compete at the games. The top three teams at the South American and Central American and Caribbean Championships will qualify for each respective tournament. The host nation (Canada) along with the United States automatically qualified a teams for the event.

=== Summary ===
Event	Date	Location	Vacancies	Qualified
Host Nation	—N/a	—N/a	1	Canada
Qualified automatically	—N/a	—N/a	1	United States
2014 South American Basketball Championship	July 23–28	(Venezuela) Isla Margarita	3	Venezuela; Argentina; Brazil
2014 Centrobasket	August 1–7	(Mexico) Tepic	3	Mexico; Puerto Rico; Dominican Republic
Total			8	

== Draw ==
Pots one through three were based on each team's finish at their respective qualification tournament. Pot 1 consisted of the champions, pot 2 the runners-up and pot 3 contained the third placed teams. Pot 4 contained the host nation, Canada and the United States. Teams were placed into groups using a random draw (with each group receiving one team per pot). The draw was held in San Juan, Puerto Rico on December 16, 2014. Canada as host nation were able to select their group after the first three pots were drawn. This automatically placed the United States into the group Canada did not select.

Pot 1	Pot 2	Pot 3	Pot 4
Mexico (19); Venezuela (29)	Puerto Rico (15); Argentina (3)	Dominican Republic (20); Brazil (9)	Canada (25); United States (1)

- Latest FIBA World Rankings (September 2014) per team is shown in brackets.

== Rosters ==
At the start of tournament, all eight participating countries had up to 12 players on their rosters.

- Argentina
- Brazil
- Canada
- Dominican Republic
- Mexico
- Puerto Rico
- United States
- Venezuela

== Results ==
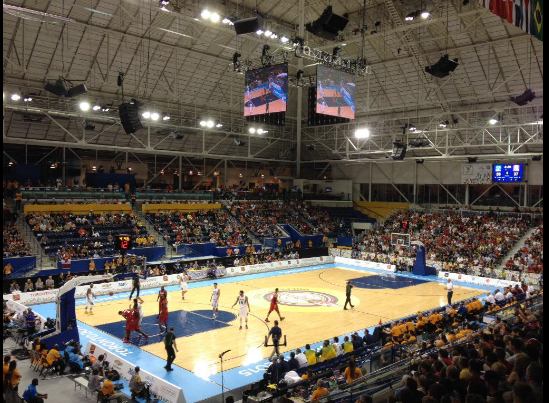
The Ryerson Athletic Centre, was the venue for the basketball competitions

All times are Eastern Daylight Time (UTC−4)

=== Preliminary round ===
==== Group A ====
Team	Pld	W	L	PF	PA	PD	Pts	Qualification
Brazil	3	3	0	264	206	+58	6	Qualified for the semifinals
United States	3	2	1	270	225	+45	5	Qualified for the semifinals
Puerto Rico	3	1	2	218	266	−48	4	
Venezuela	3	0	3	198	253	−55	3	

21 July 2015
10:30

Report

Brazil	92–59	Puerto Rico
Scoring by quarter: 31–6, 29–11, 19–25, 13–17
Pts: Hettsheimeir 19; Rebs: Batista 11; Asts: Lima 6		Pts: Clavell, De Jesús 8 Rebs: Villafañe, Young, Collier 4 Asts: Young 3

Ryerson Athletic Centre, Toronto

21 July 2015
21:00

Report

United States	85–62	Venezuela
Scoring by quarter: 18–18, 15–23, 26–12, 26–9
Pts: Wilkins 21; Rebs: Tarczewski 13; Asts: Brown 2		Pts: Cox, Bethelmy 14; Rebs: Bethelmy, Colmenares 8 Asts: Guillén 3

Ryerson Athletic Centre, Toronto

22 July 2015
13:30

Report

Venezuela	64–79	Brazil
Scoring by quarter: 9–22, 14–15, 20–17, 21–25
Pts: Cox, Colmenares 16; Rebs: Vargas Diaz 4 Asts: Vargas 3		Pts: Benite 14; Rebs: Lima 8 Asts: Luz 4

Ryerson Athletic Centre, Toronto

22 July 2015
21:00

Report

Puerto Rico	70–102	United States
Scoring by quarter: 19–29, 10–36, 23–20, 18–27
Pts: Mojica 15; Rebs: Villafañe 8 Asts: Barea 3		Pts: Brown 16; Rebs: Tarczewski 7 Asts: Brown 6

Ryerson Athletic Centre, Toronto

23 July 2015
13:30

Report

Puerto Rico	89–72	Venezuela
Scoring by quarter: 23–13, 23–25, 15–23, 28–11
Pts: Barea 27; Rebs: Clemente 7 Asts: Barea 6		Pts: Lewis 19; Rebs: Colmenares 8 Asts: Vargas, Vargas Diaz 3

Ryerson Athletic Centre, Toronto

23 July 2015
21:00

Report

United States	83–93	Brazil
Scoring by quarter: 17–24, 21–23, 19–28, 26–18
Pts: Langford 17; Rebs: Prince, Tarczewski 5 Asts: Brown 2		Pts: Benite 34; Rebs: Lima 8 Asts: Batista, Luz, Meindl 3

Ryerson Athletic Centre, Toronto

==== Group B ====
Team	Pld	W	L	PF	PA	PD	Pts	Qualification
Canada	3	3	0	289	247	+42	6	Qualified for the semifinals
Dominican Republic	3	1	2	253	255	−2	4 (Note: 1st tie-breaker: The bottom 3 teams had the exact same head-to-head record of 1–1) (Note: 2nd tie-breaker: Dominican Republic had a +15 head-to-head point differential, Argentina had a +8 head-to-head point differential, and Mexico had a −23 head-to-head point differential.)	Qualified for the semifinals
Argentina	3	1	2	247	244	+3	4	
Mexico	3	1	2	232	275	−43	4	

Notes:

21 July 2015
13:30

Report

Mexico	86–84 (OT)	Argentina
Scoring by quarter: 12–15, 25–14, 27–22, 12–25, Overtime: 10–8
Pts: Hernández 19; Rebs: Gutiérrez 14; Asts: Cruz 2		Pts: Laprovíttola 21; Rebs: Delía 10; Asts: Campazzo 5

Ryerson Athletic Centre, Toronto

21 July 2015
18:00

Report

Canada	105–88	Dominican Republic
Scoring by quarter: 20–17, 34–20, 22–25, 29–26
Pts: Heslip 24; Rebs: Bennett 10; Asts: Ejim, Doornekamp 4		Pts: Suero 17; Rebs: Delgado 6 Asts: Feliz, Suero, Delgado 2

Ryerson Athletic Centre, Toronto

22 July 2015
10:30

Report

Dominican Republic	95–70	Mexico
Scoring by quarter: 24–20, 27–20, 30–16, 14–14
Pts: Stokley 22; Rebs: Manuel Guzmán 6 Asts: Acosta, Suero 3		Pts: Cruz 21; Rebs: Ramos, Gutiérrez 7 Asts: Girón 7

Ryerson Athletic Centre, Toronto

22 July 2015
18:00

Report

Argentina	83–88	Canada
Scoring by quarter: 24–24, 26–20, 16–15, 17–29
Pts: Campazzo 23; Rebs: Richotti, Delía 5 Asts: Laprovíttola 7		Pts: Nicholson 24; Rebs: Nicholson 12; Asts: Cadougan 4

Ryerson Athletic Centre, Toronto

23 July 2015
10:30

Report

Dominican Republic	70–80	Argentina
Scoring by quarter: 18–18, 14–26, 20–10, 18–26
Pts: Stokley 19; Rebs: Santana 9 Asts: Acosta 6		Pts: Brussino 21; Rebs: Delía 8 Asts: Laprovíttola 6

Ryerson Athletic Centre, Toronto

23 July 2015
18:00

Report

Canada	96–76	Mexico
Scoring by quarter: 27–16, 22–23, 22–18, 25–19
Pts: Heslip 20; Rebs: Nicholson 10; Asts: Cadougan, Murray 2		Pts: Mendez 24; Rebs: Garibay 6 Asts: Giron 4

Ryerson Athletic Centre, Toronto

=== Classification round ===
==== Seventh place match ====
24 July 2015
10:30

Report

Venezuela	83–59	Mexico
Scoring by quarter: 16–6, 28–23, 19–15, 19–15
Pts: Cox 24; Rebs: Vargas 6 Asts: Vargas 4		Pts: Gonzalez, Ramos 11; Rebs: Gonzalez, Gutiérrez 7 Asts: Cruz 4

Ryerson Athletic Centre, Toronto

==== Fifth place match ====
24 July 2015
21:00

Report

Puerto Rico	85–105	Argentina
Scoring by quarter: 21–22, 18–20, 24–32, 22–31
Pts: de Jesus 12; Rebs: Clavell 7 Asts: Browne 5		Pts: Campazzo 17; Rebs: Delía 12; Asts: Campazzo, Laprovíttola 4

Ryerson Athletic Centre, Toronto

=== Knockout round ===
Semifinals
July 24 — Toronto
Brazil	68
Dominican Republic	62
July 24 — Toronto
Canada	111
United States	108

Final
July 25 — Toronto
Brazil	86
Canada	71
Third place
July 25 — Toronto
Dominican Republic	82
United States	87

==== Semifinals ====
24 July 2015
13:30

Report

Brazil	68–62	Dominican Republic
Scoring by quarter: 18–12, 17–17, 15–21, 18–12
Pts: Benite 18; Rebs: Lima 11; Asts: Lima, Batista 2		Pts: Stokley 15; Rebs: Santana 9 Asts: Feliz 3

Ryerson Athletic Centre, Toronto

24 July 2015
18:00

Report

United States	108–111 (OT)	Canada
Scoring by quarter: 23–24, 24–28, 33–22, 17–23, Overtime: 11–14
Pts: Brown 25; Rebs: Randolph 6 Asts: Brown 7		Pts: Nicholson 31; Rebs: Bennett 14; Asts: Murray 6

Ryerson Athletic Centre, Toronto

==== Bronze medal match ====
25 July 2015
11:00

Report

Dominican Republic	82–87	United States (bronze)
Scoring by quarter: 26–15, 22–20, 20–24, 14–28
Pts: Stokley 16; Rebs: Santana 10; Asts: Dicent 8		Pts: Brown 19; Rebs: Prince 7 Asts: Brown 5

Ryerson Athletic Centre, Toronto

==== Gold medal match ====
25 July 2015
16:30

Report

(gold) Brazil	86–71	Canada (silver)
Scoring by quarter: 26–13, 22–16, 19–25, 19–17
Pts: Lima, Taylor, Hettsheimeir 13; Rebs: Luz 7 Asts: Luz, Benite 7		Pts: Bennett 18; Rebs: Bennett 9 Asts: Doornekamp 4

Ryerson Athletic Centre, Toronto

== Awards ==
=== Topscorer ===
- (Brazil) Vítor Benite 91 pts (18.2 ppg)
- (Canada) Andrew Nicholson 91 pts (18.2 ppg)

== Final standings ==
Rank	Team	Record
1st place, gold medalist(s)	Brazil	5–0
2nd place, silver medalist(s)	Canada	4–1
3rd place, bronze medalist(s)	United States	3–2
4	Dominican Republic	1–4
5	Argentina	2–2
6	Puerto Rico	1–3
7	Venezuela	1–3
8	Mexico	1–3
