= 2016 South American Basketball Championship =

47th South American Basketball Championship

Tournament details
- Host country: Venezuela
- City: Caracas
- Dates: 26 June – 2 July
- Teams: 10 (from 1 confederation)
- Venue(s): 1 (in 1 host city)

Final positions
- Champions: Venezuela (3rd title)
- Runners-up: Brazil
- Third place: Uruguay

Tournament statistics
- MVP: (Venezuela) Gregory Vargas

Official website
- www.fiba.basketball

The 2016 South American Basketball Championship was the 47th and last edition of the FIBA South American Basketball Championship. Ten teams participated in the competition, which was held in Caracas, Venezuela, from 26 June to 2 July 2016. The top five teams qualified for the 2017 FIBA AmeriCup and the top seven teams qualified for the 2019 FIBA Basketball World Cup qualification.

Venezuela won their second consecutive South American championship by beating Brazil in the final, 64–58.

== Participating teams ==
- Venezuela (Hosts, defending champions)
- Argentina
- Bolivia
- Brazil
- Chile
- Colombia
- Ecuador
- Paraguay
- Peru
- Uruguay

== Preliminary round ==
The draw was held on 21 April 2016.

=== Group A ===
Pos	Team	Pld	W	L	PF	PA	PD	Pts	Qualification
1	Venezuela (H)	4	4	0	341	179	+162	8	Semifinals
2	Brazil	4	3	1	382	231	+151	7	Semifinals
3	Paraguay	4	2	2	256	290	−34	6	Fifth place match
4	Bolivia	4	1	3	200	359	−159	5	Seventh place match
5	Ecuador	4	0	4	230	350	−120	4	

Source: FIBA
Rules for classification: 1) Points; 2) Head-to-head results; 3) Points difference; 4) Points scored.
(H) Hosts

26 June

Boxscore

Paraguay	74–55	Bolivia
Scoring by quarter: 24–17, 9–13, 22–12, 19–13
Pts: G. Peralta 12; Rebs: Fabio 8 Asts: Vallejos 5		Pts: Camargo 22; Rebs: Salvatierra 13; Asts: Arze 9

Poliedro de Caracas, Caracas
Referees: Carlos Dueñas (COL), Bartolomé Estrada (PER), Fabricio Vito (ARG)

26 June

Boxscore

Ecuador	34–97	Venezuela
Scoring by quarter: 7–17, 7–29, 5–26, 15–25
Pts: Delgado 7 Rebs: Mina 6 Asts: Guayaquil 2		Pts: Bethelmy 17; Rebs: Ruiz 10; Asts: four players 4

Poliedro de Caracas, Caracas
Referees: Alejandro Sánchez (URU), Felipe Valenzuela (CHI), Roberto Vázquez (PUR)

27 June

Boxscore

Brazil	107–65	Ecuador
Scoring by quarter: 26–21, 31–16, 30–17, 20–11
Pts: Olivinha 18; Rebs: three players 10; Asts: Meindl 5		Pts: Delgado 22; Rebs: Delgado 6 Asts: Martínez 4

Poliedro de Caracas, Caracas
Referees: Carlos Dueñas (COL), Fabricio Vito (ARG), Alejandro Sánchez (URU)

27 June

Boxscore

Venezuela	77–48	Paraguay
Scoring by quarter: 18–5, 17–8, 17–17, 25–18
Pts: G. Vargas 13; Rebs: Colmenares, Lewis 6 Asts: G. Vargas 8		Pts: Pérez 8 Rebs: Bareiro 6 Asts: Fabio 3

Poliedro de Caracas, Caracas
Referees: Jorge Cabrera (CUB), Stephen Seibel (CAN), Felipe Valenzuela (CHI)

28 June

Boxscore

Paraguay	63–101	Brazil
Scoring by quarter: 6–28, 18–24, 22–28, 17–21
Pts: Peralta 11; Rebs: Mellone 8 Asts: three players 2		Pts: Olivinha 21; Rebs: Jefferson, Toledo 8 Asts: Fúlvio 9

Poliedro de Caracas, Caracas
Referees: Roberto Vázquez (PUR), Felipe Valenzuela (CHI), Fabricio Vito (ARG)

28 June

Boxscore

Bolivia	37–97	Venezuela
Scoring by quarter: 14–24, 9–25, 8–18, 6–30
Pts: Ramos 9 Rebs: Salvatierra 6 Asts: Arze, Ramos 3		Pts: Pérez 27; Rebs: Ruiz 7 Asts: Cazorla, Colmenares 6

Poliedro de Caracas, Caracas
Referees: Reynaldo Mercedes (DOM), Bartolomé Estrada (PER), Alejandro Sánchez (URU)

29 June

Boxscore

Ecuador	57–71	Paraguay
Scoring by quarter: 7–24, 20–21, 14–14, 16–12
Pts: Mina 16; Rebs: Mina 14; Asts: Martínez 5		Pts: Zanotti 16; Rebs: Vallejos 7 Asts: four players 3

Poliedro de Caracas, Caracas
Referees: Fabricio Vito (ARG), Carlos Dueñas (COL), Alejandro Sánchez (URU)

29 June

Boxscore

Brazil	114–33	Bolivia
Scoring by quarter: 31–7, 30–6, 25–7, 28–13
Pts: Jefferson 20; Rebs: Lucas, Toledo 7 Asts: Coelho, Deodato 6		Pts: Ramos 12; Rebs: Salvatierra 5 Asts: Salvatierra 2

Poliedro de Caracas, Caracas
Referees: Jorge Cabrera (CUB), Bartolomé Estrada (PER), Felipe Valenzuela (CHI)

30 June

Boxscore

Bolivia	75–74 (OT)	Ecuador
Scoring by quarter: 15–17, 15–18, 15–17, 21–14, Overtime: 9–8
Pts: Camargo 19; Rebs: Salvatierra 13; Asts: Arze 6		Pts: Delgado 17; Rebs: Caicedo 12; Asts: Orozco 8

Poliedro de Caracas, Caracas
Referees: Fabricio Vito (ARG), Carlos Dueñas (COL), Felipe Valenzuela (CHI)

30 June

Boxscore

Venezuela	70–60	Brazil
Scoring by quarter: 13–15, 20–16, 21–15, 16–14
Pts: Lewis 16; Rebs: Colmenares 6 Asts: Lewis, G. Vargas 4		Pts: de Souza 11; Rebs: Olivinha 11; Asts: Fúlvio 8

Poliedro de Caracas, Caracas
Referees: Stephen Seibel (CAN), Alejandro Sánchez (URU), Roberto Vázquez (PUR)

=== Group B ===
Pos	Team	Pld	W	L	PF	PA	PD	Pts	Qualification
1	Argentina	4	4	0	396	241	+155	8	Semifinals
2	Uruguay	4	3	1	301	242	+59	7	Semifinals
3	Colombia	4	2	2	284	277	+7	6	Fifth place match
4	Chile	4	1	3	279	339	−60	5	Seventh place match
5	Peru	4	0	4	198	359	−161	4	

Source: FIBA
Rules for classification: 1) Points; 2) Head-to-head results; 3) Points difference; 4) Points scored.

26 June

Boxscore

Peru	59–78	Chile
Scoring by quarter: 14–18, 12–24, 14–17, 19–19
Pts: Fuller 16; Rebs: Masias 7 Asts: Bellatin, Fuller 5		Pts: Carrión 20; Rebs: Isla 11; Asts: Carrasco 16

Poliedro de Caracas, Caracas
Referees: Roberto Oliveros (VEN), Gustavo Vera (PAR), Flavio Zavala (ECU)

26 June

Boxscore

Uruguay	60–54	Colombia
Scoring by quarter: 10–15, 14–13, 15–14, 21–12
Pts: Fitipaldo 15; Rebs: Batista 10; Asts: Fitipaldo 4		Pts: Ortiz 15; Rebs: Hernández 10; Asts: Caicedo, Ortiz 4

Poliedro de Caracas, Caracas
Referees: Marcos Benito (BRA), Jorge Cabrera (CUB), Américo Rodríguez (VEN)

27 June

Boxscore

Colombia	81–46	Peru
Scoring by quarter: 17–14, 21–9, 20–11, 23–12
Pts: Ortiz 26; Rebs: Hinestroza 10; Asts: Ortiz 8		Pts: Morales 15; Rebs: Céspedes, Chávez 5 Asts: Barrios 4

Poliedro de Caracas, Caracas
Referees: Marcos Benito (BRA), Américo Rodríguez (VEN), Gustavo Vera (PAR)

27 June

Boxscore

Argentina	82–58	Uruguay
Scoring by quarter: 8–14, 28–15, 24–13, 22–16
Pts: Schattmann 13; Rebs: Delía 10; Asts: Brussino 6		Pts: Fitipaldo 12; Rebs: Batista 11; Asts: Parodi 5

Poliedro de Caracas, Caracas
Referees: Reynaldo Mercedes (DOM), Roberto Oliveros (VEN), Flavio Zavala (ECU)

28 June

Boxscore

Peru	43–105	Argentina
Scoring by quarter: 14–23, 13–31, 5–30, 11–21
Pts: Fuller 19; Rebs: Fuller 6 Asts: Barrios 3		Pts: Aguerre, Schattmann 14; Rebs: Delía 9 Asts: De los Santos 7

Poliedro de Caracas, Caracas
Referees: Jorge Cabrera (CUB), Gustavo Vera (PAR), Flavio Zavala (ECU)

28 June

Boxscore

Chile	74–80	Colombia
Scoring by quarter: 12–18, 23–20, 21–15, 18–27
Pts: Suárez 19; Rebs: Carrasco, Fontena 6 Asts: Coro 5		Pts: Ortiz 28; Rebs: Pérez 8 Asts: Caicedo 8

Poliedro de Caracas, Caracas
Referees: Stephen Seibel (CAN), Marcos Benito (BRA), Américo Rodríguez (VEN)

29 June

Boxscore

Uruguay	95–50	Peru
Scoring by quarter: 25–17, 14–8, 37–12, 19–13
Pts: Calfani 20; Rebs: Vázquez 10; Asts: Zanotta 11		Pts: Fuller 20; Rebs: Fuller 8 Asts: Fuller 4

Poliedro de Caracas, Caracas
Referees: Marcos Benito (BRA), Américo Rodríguez (VEN), Gustavo Vera (PAR)

29 June

Boxscore

Argentina	112–71	Chile
Scoring by quarter: 27–16, 23–17, 30–16, 32–22
Pts: Brussino 18; Rebs: Delía, Saiz 6 Asts: Deck 7		Pts: Carvacho 11; Rebs: Fontena 8 Asts: Carrasco 7

Poliedro de Caracas, Caracas
Referees: Roberto Vázquez (PUR), Roberto Oliveros (VEN), Flavio Zavala (ECU)

30 June

Boxscore

Chile	56–88	Uruguay
Scoring by quarter: 9–25, 21–14, 15–31, 11–18
Pts: Carvacho 10; Rebs: Carvacho 11; Asts: Carrasco 4		Pts: Calfani 22; Rebs: Calfani 10; Asts: Fitipaldo 8

Poliedro de Caracas, Caracas
Referees: Marcos Benito (BRA), Roberto Oliveros (VEN), Gustavo Vera (PAR)

30 June

Boxscore

Colombia	69–97	Argentina
Scoring by quarter: 19–22, 15–20, 20–25, 15–30
Pts: Jackson 24; Rebs: Pérez 6 Asts: Salazar 4		Pts: Romano 20; Rebs: Romano 6 Asts: Mainoldi 7

Poliedro de Caracas, Caracas
Referees: Reynaldo Mercedes (DOM), Jorge Cabrera (CUB), Flavio Zavala (ECU)

== Final round ==
Semifinals
1 July
Venezuela	74
Uruguay	62
1 July
Argentina	82
Brazil	88

Final
2 July
Venezuela	64
Brazil	58
Third place
2 July
Uruguay	87
Argentina	83

=== Semifinals ===
1 July

Boxscore

Argentina	82–88	Brazil
Scoring by quarter: 20–28, 26–21, 16–16, 20–23
Pts: four players 12; Rebs: four players 5 Asts: Balbi, Brussino 4		Pts: Fúlvio 19; Rebs: Olivinha 8 Asts: Fúlvio 6

Poliedro de Caracas, Caracas
Referees: Stephen Seibel (CAN), Reynaldo Mercedes (DOM), Flavio Zavala (ECU)

1 July

Boxscore

Venezuela	74–62	Uruguay
Scoring by quarter: 15–18, 21–13, 18–13, 20–18
Pts: Cubillán 16; Rebs: Colmenares 12; Asts: Colmenares 6		Pts: Aguiar, Fitipaldo 15; Rebs: Fitipaldo 8 Asts: Fitipaldo 8

Poliedro de Caracas, Caracas
Referees: Roberto Vázquez (PUR), Jorge Cabrera (CUB), Felipe Valenzuela (CHI)

=== Seventh place game ===
1 July

Boxscore

Bolivia	55–70	Chile
Scoring by quarter: 11–15, 13–23, 9–19, 22–13
Pts: Veizaga 14; Rebs: Salvatierra 11; Asts: Ochoa 3		Pts: Carrión 14; Rebs: Carvacho 15; Asts: Carrasco, Suárez 4

Poliedro de Caracas, Caracas
Referees: Alejandro Sánchez (URU), Carlos Dueñas (COL), Américo Rodríguez (VEN)

=== Fifth place game ===
1 July

Boxscore

Paraguay	58–82	Colombia
Scoring by quarter: 15–26, 15–18, 12–21, 16–17
Pts: A. Peralta 11; Rebs: A. Peralta 6 Asts: Zanotti 5		Pts: Jackson 24; Rebs: Hernández 11; Asts: Atencia 4

Poliedro de Caracas, Caracas
Referees: Marcos Benito (BRA), Roberto Oliveros (VEN), Fabricio Vito (ARG)

=== Third place game ===
2 July

Boxscore

Uruguay	87–83	Argentina
Scoring by quarter: 25–18, 18–21, 22–27, 22–17
Pts: Parodi 24; Rebs: Batista 13; Asts: Fitipaldo 5		Pts: Mainoldi 18; Rebs: Aguerre 8 Asts: Brussino 5

Poliedro de Caracas, Caracas
Referees: Reynaldo Mercedes (DOM), Marcos Benito (BRA), Roberto Oliveros (VEN)

=== Final ===
2 July

Boxscore

Venezuela	64–58	Brazil
Scoring by quarter: 20–17, 15–16, 13–17, 16–8
Pts: G. Vargas 21; Rebs: Colmenares 9 Asts: J. Vargas 5		Pts: Toledo 13; Rebs: Olivinha 8 Asts: Fúlvio 7

Poliedro de Caracas, Caracas
Referees: Stephen Seibel (CAN), Jorge Cabrera (CUB), Roberto Vázquez (PUR)

2016 South American
Basketball Championship winners

Venezuela
3rd title

== Final standings ==
The top five teams qualified for the 2017 FIBA AmeriCup and the top seven teams qualified for the 2019 FIBA Basketball World Cup qualification.

Rank	Team	Record
1st place, gold medalist(s)	Venezuela	6–0
2nd place, silver medalist(s)	Brazil	4–2
3rd place, bronze medalist(s)	Uruguay	4–2
4	Argentina	4–2
5	Colombia	3–2
6	Paraguay	2–3
7	Chile	2–3
8	Bolivia	1–4
9	Ecuador	0–4
10	Peru	0–4

Qualified for the 2017 FIBA AmeriCup and for the 2019 FIBA Basketball World Cup qualification
Qualified for the 2019 FIBA Basketball World Cup qualification
