= 2014 South American Basketball Championship =

46th South American Basketball Championship

Tournament details
- Host country: Venezuela
- City: Isla Margarita
- Dates: 23–28 July
- Teams: 8 (from 1 confederation)
- Venue(s): 1 (in 1 host city)

Final positions
- Champions: Venezuela (2nd title)
- Runners-up: Argentina
- Third place: Brazil

Tournament statistics
- MVP: (Venezuela) Greivis Vásquez

Official website
- www.fiba.basketball/history

The 2014 South American Basketball Championship was the 46th edition of the South American Basketball Championship. Eight teams participated in the competition, held in Isla Margarita, Venezuela, from 24 to July 28. Argentina were the defending champions. The top three teams qualified for the 2015 Pan-American Games, with the top four teams qualified for the 2015 FIBA Americas Championship.

== Preliminary round ==
All times are local (UTC-04:30).

=== Group A ===
Pos	Team	Pld	W	L	PF	PA	PD	Pts	Qualification
1	Argentina	3	3	0	239	168	+71	6	Semifinals
2	Brazil	3	2	1	238	174	+64	5	Semifinals
3	Paraguay	3	1	2	204	221	−17	4	5th–8th place playoffs
4	Ecuador	3	0	3	171	289	−118	3	5th–8th place playoffs

Source: FIBA

July 24
15:00

Report

Ecuador	44–100	Argentina
Scoring by quarter: 9–10, 13–37, 4–32, 18–21
Pts: Carcelén 9 Rebs: Delgado 7 Asts: Cárdenas 2		Pts: Mata 15; Rebs: five players 3 Asts: three players 3

July 24
17:30

Report

Brazil	73–56	Paraguay
Scoring by quarter: 14–17, 18–9, 23–11, 18–19
Pts: Hettsheimeir 13; Rebs: Hettsheimeir 9 Asts: Chaia 3		Pts: Araujo 16; Rebs: Pérez, Fabio 4 Asts: four players 2

July 25
12:30

Report

Ecuador	54–106	Brazil
Scoring by quarter: 16–17, 11–29, 6–31, 21–29
Pts: Carcelén 9 Rebs: Quintero 8 Asts: Quintero 2		Pts: Nascimento, Souza 17; Rebs: Nascimento, Felício 7 Asts: Chaia 8

July 25
17:30

Report

Argentina	75–65	Paraguay
Scoring by quarter: 25–15, 11–19, 27–13, 12–18
Pts: Richotti 16; Rebs: Laprovíttola 7 Asts: Laprovíttola 5		Pts: Fabio 19; Rebs: Fabio 12; Asts: four players 2

July 26
12:30

Report

Paraguay	83–73	Ecuador
Scoring by quarter: 20–13, 24–19, 20–17, 19–24
Pts: Fabio 18; Rebs: Fabio 15; Asts: Fabio 5		Pts: Carcelén 20; Rebs: Delgado 7 Asts: Cárdenas 4

July 26
17:30

Report

Brazil	59–64	Argentina
Scoring by quarter: 12–21, 15–8, 19–8, 13–27
Pts: Silva 12; Rebs: Souza 10; Asts: Luz 2		Pts: Safar 17; Rebs: Espinoza 7 Asts: Figueroa 3

=== Group B ===
Pos	Team	Pld	W	L	PF	PA	PD	Pts	Qualification
1	Venezuela	3	3	0	229	167	+62	6	Semifinals
2	Uruguay	3	2	1	258	164	+94	5	Semifinals
3	Chile	3	1	2	192	238	−46	4	5th–8th place playoffs
4	Peru	3	0	3	164	274	−110	3	5th–8th place playoffs

Source: FIBA

July 24
12:30

Report

Uruguay	92–52	Chile
Scoring by quarter: 16–8, 26–15, 28–15, 22–14
Pts: Aguiar 18; Rebs: Wachsmann-Mallner 12; Asts: Osimani 6		Pts: Suárez 13; Rebs: Fontena, Valencia 5 Asts: Schuler, Valencia 1

July 24
20:00

Report

Peru	49–86	Venezuela
Scoring by quarter: 11–28, 13–18, 12–27, 13–13
Pts: Chávez, Saldaña 10; Rebs: Masias 6 Asts: Céspedes, Masias 3		Pts: Vásquez 13; Rebs: Colmenares 6 Asts: Vásquez 4

July 25
15:00

Report

Peru	45–103	Uruguay
Scoring by quarter: 4–25, 16–23, 10–29, 15–26
Pts: Sambucetti 15; Rebs: Chávez 6 Asts: Morales, López 3		Pts: Aguilera 15; Rebs: Borsellino 15; Asts: Osimani 5

July 25
20:00

Report

Venezuela	76–55	Chile
Scoring by quarter: 22–14, 22–13, 19–13, 13–15
Pts: Vásquez 15; Rebs: Vásquez 6 Asts: Cubillán 5		Pts: Isla 12; Rebs: Valencia 7 Asts: Isla 3

July 26
15:00

Report

Chile	85–70	Peru
Scoring by quarter: 23–18, 24–15, 24–17, 14–20
Pts: Morales 18; Rebs: Fontena 7 Asts: Carrasco 3		Pts: Bellatin, Monges 15; Rebs: three players 5 Asts: Chávez 4

July 26
20:00

Report

Venezuela	67–63	Uruguay
Scoring by quarter: 20–13, 10–9, 19–28, 18–13
Pts: Vásquez 19; Rebs: Marriaga 7 Asts: Vásquez 4		Pts: Aguiar 14; Rebs: Wachsmann-Mallner 9 Asts: Fitipaldo 3

== Knockout round ==
Main bracket

Semifinals
July 27 – Isla Margarita
Argentina	79
Uruguay	68
July 27 – Isla Margarita
Venezuela	66
Brazil	65

Final
July 28 – Isla Margarita
Argentina	65
Venezuela	74
Third place match
July 28 – Isla Margarita
Uruguay	61
Brazil	66

5th place bracket

5th–8th place semifinals
July 27 – Isla Margarita
Paraguay	80
Peru	56
July 27 – Isla Margarita
Chile	74
Ecuador	57

Fifth place match
July 28 – Isla Margarita
Paraguay	75
Chile	49
Seventh place match
July 28 – Isla Margarita
Peru	63
Ecuador	90

=== 5th–8th place semifinals ===
July 27
12:30

Report

Paraguay	80–56	Peru
Scoring by quarter: 16–4, 17–19, 25–22, 22–11
Pts: Pérez, Zanotti 14; Rebs: Ortiz 9 Asts: four players 2		Pts: Morales, Monges 14; Rebs: Masias 5 Asts: Monges 4

July 27
15:00

Report

Chile	74–57	Ecuador
Scoring by quarter: 26–14, 16–9, 18–18, 14–16
Pts: Isla 18; Rebs: Isla 10; Asts: Valencia 5		Pts: Carcelén 14; Rebs: Quintero 16; Asts: Delgado, Tenorio 2

=== Semifinals ===
July 27
17:30

Report

Argentina	79–68	Uruguay
Scoring by quarter: 31–20, 11–13, 21–13, 16–22
Pts: Laprovíttola 15; Rebs: Delía 6 Asts: Laprovíttola 6		Pts: Aguiar 21; Rebs: Wachsmann-Mallner 8 Asts: Parodi 2

July 27
20:00

Report

Venezuela	66–65	Brazil
Scoring by quarter: 16–15, 12–11, 22–29, 16–10
Pts: Guillent 15; Rebs: Marriaga 5 Asts: Guillent 4		Pts: Neto 15; Rebs: Felício 9 Asts: Luz, Neto 3

=== Seventh place match ===
July 28
12:30

Report

Peru	63–90	Ecuador
Scoring by quarter: 29–27, 12–25, 9–20, 13–18
Pts: Monges 19; Rebs: Monges, Masias 5 Asts: Monges 5		Pts: Cárdenas 26; Rebs: Quintero 14; Asts: three players 2

=== Fifth place match ===
July 28
15:00

Report

Paraguay	75–49	Chile
Scoring by quarter: 21–9, 21–13, 15–17, 18–10
Pts: Fabio 18; Rebs: Araujo, Ortiz 8 Asts: Pérez 8		Pts: Suárez 18; Rebs: Valencia 6 Asts: Isla 3

=== Third place match ===
July 28
17:30

Report

Uruguay	61–66	Brazil
Scoring by quarter: 17–18, 12–18, 18–21, 14–9
Pts: Fitipaldo 26; Rebs: Calfani 6 Asts: Osimani 5		Pts: Benite 16; Rebs: Hettsheimeir 10; Asts: Benite 3

=== Final ===
July 28
20:00

Report

Argentina	65–74	Venezuela
Scoring by quarter: 16–14, 15–15, 11–19, 23–26
Pts: Safar 16; Rebs: Leiva 10; Asts: Laprovíttola, Bortolín 2		Pts: Vásquez 24; Rebs: J. Vargas 6 Asts: Vásquez 4

== Final standings ==
Rank	Team	Record
1st place, gold medalist(s)	Venezuela	5–0
2nd place, silver medalist(s)	Argentina	4–1
3rd place, bronze medalist(s)	Brazil	3–2
4th	Uruguay	2–3
5th	Paraguay	3–2
6th	Chile	2–3
7th	Ecuador	1–4
8th	Peru	0–5

Qualified for both the 2015 Pan American Games and 2015 FIBA Americas Championship
Qualified for the 2015 FIBA Americas Championship
