= Peru men's national basketball team =

National basketball team

Peru
- FIBA ranking: NR (1 September 2026)
- Joined FIBA: 1936
- FIBA zone: FIBA Americas
- National federation: Peru Basketball Federation
- Coach: Carlos Zanelatto

Olympic Games
- Appearances: 3
- Medals: None

FIBA World Cup
- Appearances: 4
- Medals: None

FIBA AmeriCup
- Appearances: None
Home	Away

The Peru national basketball team represents Peru in international men's basketball competition,and is administered by the Peru Basketball Federation (Spanish: Federación Deportiva Peruana de Basketball) or FDPB for short.

Peru joined the International Federation of Basketball (FIBA) in 1936 and has one of the world's longest basketball traditions. It was the second best South American contender at the 1936 Summer Olympics. Until the mid 1970s, Peru was one of South America's major basketball forces. At the 1964 Summer Olympics, Peru was the only contender that kept the dominant United States to only 60 points. Between 1950 and 1967, Peru qualified for four out of five Basketball World Cups. Their best result to date was 7th place at the 1950 FIBA World Cup. From 1963 to 1973, it finished in the Top Four at the South American Basketball Championship at six straight events. However, after 1973, the team went through a steep decline. The team won its last victory at the South American Basketball Championship on 22 July 2001, when Peru beat Ecuador 72–58.

== Competitive record ==
=== Olympic Games ===
Year	Position	Tournament	Host
1936	8	Basketball at the 1936 Summer Olympics	Berlin, Germany
1948	10	Basketball at the 1948 Summer Olympics	London, United Kingdom
1964	15	Basketball at the 1964 Summer Olympics	Tokyo, Japan
2020	Did not qualify	Basketball at the 2020 Summer Olympics	Tokyo, Japan
2024	Did not qualify	Basketball at the 2024 Summer Olympics	Paris, France

=== FIBA World Cup ===
Year	Position	Tournament	Host
1950	7	1950 FIBA World Championship	Buenos Aires, Argentina
1954	12	1954 FIBA World Championship	Rio de Janeiro, Brazil
1963	12	1963 FIBA World Championship	Rio de Janeiro, Brazil
1967	10	1967 FIBA World Championship	Uruguay
2019	Did not qualify	2019 FIBA Basketball World Cup	China
2023	Did not qualify	2023 FIBA Basketball World Cup	Philippines, Japan and Indonesia
2027	To be determined	2027 FIBA Basketball World Cup	Qatar

=== FIBA AmeriCup ===
FIBA AmeriCup
Year	Result	Position	Pld	W	L	PF	PA	PD	Team
(Puerto Rico) 1980	did not compete								
(Brazil) 1984	did not qualify								
(Uruguay) 1988	did not qualify								
(Mexico) 1989	did not qualify								
(United States) 1992	did not qualify								
(Puerto Rico) 1993	did not qualify								
(Argentina) 1995	did not qualify								
(Uruguay) 1997	did not qualify								
(Puerto Rico) 1999	did not qualify								
(Argentina) 2001	did not qualify								
(Puerto Rico) 2003	did not qualify								
(Dominican Republic) 2005	did not qualify								
(United States) 2007	did not qualify								
(Puerto Rico) 2009	did not qualify								
(Argentina) 2011	did not qualify								
(Venezuela) 2013	did not qualify								
(Mexico) 2015	did not qualify								
(Argentina) (Colombia) (Uruguay) 2017	did not qualify								
(Brazil) 2022	did not qualify								
(Nicaragua) 2025	did not qualify								
Total	0 titles	0/20	0	0	0	0	0	0	

=== Pan American Games ===
Pan American Games
Year	Result	Position	Pld	W	L	PF	PA	PD	Team
(Argentina) 1951	did not qualify								
(Mexico) 1955	did not qualify								
(United States) 1959	did not qualify								
(Brazil) 1963		5th							
(Canada) 1967		8th							
(Colombia) 1971		8th	3	1	2				
(Mexico) 1975	did not qualify								
(Puerto Rico) 1979	did not qualify								
(Venezuela) 1983	did not qualify								
(United States) 1987	did not qualify								
(Cuba) 1991	did not qualify								
(Argentina) 1995	did not qualify								
(Canada) 1999	did not qualify								
(Dominican Republic) 2003	did not qualify								
(Brazil) 2007	did not qualify								
(Mexico) 2011	did not qualify								
(Canada) 2015	did not qualify								
(Peru) 2019	did not qualify								
(Chile) 2023	did not qualify								
(Peru) 2027	To be determined								
(Paraguay) 2031	To be determined								
Total									

=== South American Basketball Championship ===
- 1937 : 4th
- 1938 : (gold)
- 1939 : 4th
- 1940 : 5th
- 1941 : (silver)
- 1942 : Did not participate
- 1943 : (bronze)
- 1945 : Did not participate
- 1947 : 6th
- 1949 : 4th
- 1953 : 5th
- 1955 : 5th
- 1958 : 7th
- 1960 : Did not participate
- 1961 : 5th
- 1963 : (silver)
- 1966 : (bronze)
- 1968 : (bronze)
- 1969 : 4th
- 1971 : 4th
- 1973 : (bronze)
- 1976 : 7th
- 1977 : 5th
- 1979 : 7th
- 1981 : 5th
- 1983 : Did not participate
- 1985 : 8th
- 1987 : 5th
- 1989 : 8th
- 1991 : 8th
- 1993 : Did not participate
- 1995 : Did not participate
- 1997 : 9th
- 1999 : 8th
- 2001 : 8th
- 2003–2012 : Did not participate
- 2014 : 8th
- 2016 : 10th

== Current roster ==
At the 2018 South American Games:

Peru men's national basketball team roster
Players
Coaches

Pos.	No.	Name	Age – Date of birth	Height	Club	Ctr.
G		Cesar Villalobos	18 – 1 March 2000	1.86 m (6 ft 1 in)	Real Club de Lima	(Peru)
G/F		Derek Calmet	16 – 14 July 2001	1.95 m (6 ft 5 in)
G/F		Diego Gonzales	17 – 12 August 2000	1.94 m (6 ft 4 in)
PG		Franco Naters	16 – 10 July 2001	1.84 m (6 ft 0 in)
F		Gonzalo Bernabe	18 – 23 March 2000	1.97 m (6 ft 6 in)
C		Jose Mesones	17 – 2 November 2000	1.97 m (6 ft 6 in)	Colegio Inmaculada	(Peru)
PG		Juan Venegas	18 – 6 February 2000	1.83 m (6 ft 0 in)
F/C		Julio Regalado	23 – 11 June 1994	2.04 m (6 ft 8 in)	Real Club de Lima	(Peru)
PG		Matias Herrera	20 – 20 February 1998	1.83 m (6 ft 0 in)	CD Aleman Puerto Varas Concepcion	(Chile)
F		Miro Egoavil	17 – 5 October 2000	1.96 m (6 ft 5 in)
F		Roberto Ramirez	17 – 17 December 2000	1.97 m (6 ft 6 in)	San Carlos Basketball	(Dominican Republic)
G		Rodrigo Rivera	18 – 24 March 2000	1.77 m (5 ft 10 in)	Colegio Los Leones de Quilpué	(Chile)

Legend

- Club – describes last
  club before the tournament
- Age – describes age
  on 3 June 2018

=== Depth chart ===
Pos.	Starting 5	Bench
C
PF
SF
SG
PG

== Head coach position ==
- (Argentina) Gustavo De Benedetti
- (Paraguay) Carlos Zanelatto – 2016

== Past rosters ==
1936 Olympic Games: finished 8th among 21 teams

Miguel Godoy, Luis Jacob, Roberto Rospigliosi, Koko Cárdenas, Fernando Ruiz, "Canon" Ore, Jose Carlos Godoy, Armando Rossi, Rolando Bacigalupo, Manuel Fiestas, Willy Dasso, Antuco Flecha (Coach: Pedro Vera)

1948 Olympic Games: finished 10th among 23 teams

Eduardo Fiestas, Carlos Alegre, Rodolfo Salas, David Descalzo, Luis Sánchez, Soracco Ríos, José Vizcarra, Alberto Fernández, Ahrens Valdivia, Virgilio Drago, Ferreyros Pérez

1950 World Championship: finished 7th among 10 teams

Eduardo Fiestas, Carlos Alegre, David Descalzo, Alberto Fernández, Luis Gardella, Rodolfo Salas, Luis Vergara, Francisco de Zela, Virgilio Drago, Guillermo Airaldi, Mario Castro, Ernesto Ortiz (Coach: Carlos Rojas y Rojas)

1954 World Championship: finished 12th among 12 teams

Eduardo Fiestas, Hernán Sánchez, José Vizcarra, Virgilio Drago, Jorge Ferreyros, Isaac Loveday, Amalfi Lucioni, José Chocano, Rodolfo Salas, Álvaro Castro, Guillermo Toro, Aurelio Moreyra, Víctor Obando (Coach: Luis Alberto Sánchez)

1963 World Championship: finished 12th among 13 teams

Ricardo Duarte, Luis Gusmán, Jorge Vargas, Oscar Benalcazar, Fernando Claudet, Antonio Sangio, Ernesto Podestá, Enrique Duarte, Oscar Sevilla, Francisco Saldarriaga, Tomás Sangio, Raúl Duarte (Coach: Guillermo Ross / James McGregor)

1964 Olympic Games: finished 15th among 16 teams

Ricardo Duarte, Jorge Vargas, Oscar Benalcazar, Simón Paredes, Enrique Duarte, José Gusmán, Tomás Sangio, Carlos Vásquez, Raúl Duarte, Oscar Sevilla, Manuel Valerio, Luis Duarte (Coach: Fernando Cordova)

1967 World Championship: finished 10th among 13 teams

Ricardo Duarte, Jorge Vargas, Oscar Sevilla, Manuel Vigo, Tomás Sangio, César Vittorelli, José Verano, Manuel Valerio, Raúl Duarte, Walter Fleming, Simón Paredes, Carlos Vásquez (Coach: Carlos Alegre Benavides)

2008 Squad: According to Federacion Deportiva Peruana de Basketball

Players
Pos	Name	Ht.
C	Eduardo "papi" Coz	1.80 m
PG	Carlo Gismondi	1.85 m
F	Bryan Ortiz	1.87 m
C	Jack Garcia	1.90 m
PG	Miguel Farfan	1.85 m
F	Christian Giha	1.83 m
F	Fernando Dedios	1.80 m
C	Francisco Carulla	1.94 m
C	Giancarlo Risco	1.88 m
PG	Rodrigo Ruiz	1.80 m
C	Frank Lawal	2.22 m

Coaching staff
Position	Name
Coaching Manager	Mario Ramos Falconí
Head coach	Bradley Ortiz
Assistant coach	
Physiotherapist	Janet Serrano Castro

At the 2016 South American Basketball Championship:

Peru men's national basketball team roster
Players
Coaches

Pos.	No.	Name	Age – Date of birth	Height	Club	Ctr.
G	4	Jose Lopez Alva	26 – 5 January 1990	1.84 m (6 ft 0 in)	Regatas Lima	(Peru)
C	5	Julio Regalado	22 – 11 June 1994	2.04 m (6 ft 8 in)	Real Club	(Peru)
PG	6	Luis Barrios	25 – 21 September 1990	1.83 m (6 ft 0 in)	Faraday Club	(Peru)
C	7	Manuel Chavez	29 – 19 April 1987	2.02 m (6 ft 8 in)	Inmaculada	(Peru)
F	8	Alejandro Bellatin	26 – 21 January 1990	1.88 m (6 ft 2 in)	Regatas Lima	(Peru)
SF	9	Manuel Morales	28 – 28 December 1987	1.95 m (6 ft 5 in)	Regatas Lima	(Peru)
F	10	Martin La Rosa Peron	28 – 22 June 1988	1.91 m (6 ft 3 in)	Inmaculada	(Peru)
PG	11	Kyle Fuller	24 – 27 January 1992	1.83 m (6 ft 0 in)	Regatas Lima	(Peru)
PF	13	Carlos Cespedes	27 – 4 November 1988	1.96 m (6 ft 5 in)	Regatas Lima	(Peru)
C	14	Rodrigo Masias	35 – 11 March 1981	2.06 m (6 ft 9 in)	Regatas Lima	(Peru)
F	15	Angelo Parodi	27 – 24 May 1989	1.85 m (6 ft 1 in)	Real Club	(Peru)
F	17	Gianfranco Sambuceti	28 – 22 February 1988	1.82 m (6 ft 0 in)	Regatas Lima	(Peru)

Head coach

- (Paraguay) Carlos Zanelatto

Legend

- Club – describes last
  club before the tournament
- Age – describes age
  on 26 June 2016

== Kit ==
=== Manufacturer ===
2016: Peak

== See also ==
- Peru men's national under-17 basketball team
- Peru men's national under-15 basketball team
- Peru women's national basketball team
