= Néstor García (basketball) =

Argentine basketball coach (born 1965)

Che García
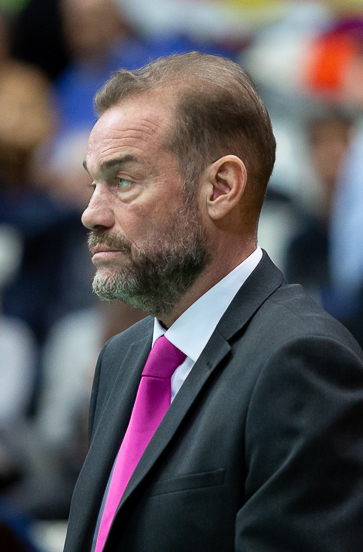

Calor de Cancún
- Position: Head coach
- League: LNBP

Personal information
- Born: 11 January 1965 (age 61) Bahía Blanca, Argentina
- Coaching career: 1990–present

Career history

Coaching
- 1990–1992: Estudiantes de Bahía Blanca
- 1992–1997: Peñarol de Mar del Plata
- 1997–1999: Boca Juniors
- 2000: Cangrejeros de Santurce
- 2000–2001: Boca Juniors
- 2001: Guaiqueríes de Margarita
- 2001: Libertad de Sunchales
- 2002: Marinos de Anzoátegui
- 2003–2004: Libertad de Sunchales
- 2003: Uruguay
- 2004: Al Ahli Sport Club
- 2004–2005: Argentino de Junín
- 2006: Trotamundos de Carabobo
- 2006–2007: Panteras de Miranda
- 2007: Guaros de Lara
- 2008: Marinos de Anzoátegui
- 2008–2009: Club Biguá de Villa Biarritz
- 2009: Gaiteros del Zulia
- 2009–2010: Halcones de Xalapa
- 2010–2011: Minas Tênis Clube
- 2011: Marinos de Anzoátegui
- 2011: Argentina (assistant)
- 2011–2012: Atenas de Córdoba
- 2012: Argentina
- 2012–2013: Boca Juniors
- 2013–2017: Venezuela
- 2014–2016: Guaros de Lara
- 2016–2017: Quimsa
- 2017–2018: Fuenlabrada
- 2018–2019: Fuenlabrada
- 2019: Dominican Republic
- 2021: Cangrejeros de Santurce
- 2021–2022: Argentina
- 2022–present: Dominican Republic
- 2026: Gran Canaria
- 2026–present: El Calor de Cancún

Career highlights
- As head coach: FIBA Americas League champion (2016); South American Club Championship champion (2008); Argentine League champion (1994); 2× Venezuelan League champion (2006, 2011); Uruguayan League champion (2009)
Medals
Men's basketball
Representing Argentina
FIBA South American Championship
Gold medal – first place	2012 Resistencia
Representing Venezuela
FIBA AmeriCup
Gold medal – first place	2015 Mexico City
FIBA South American Championship
Gold medal – first place	2014 Isla Margarita
Gold medal – first place	2016 Caracas

Néstor Rafael "Che" García (born 11 January 1965) is an Argentine professional basketball coach, who is currently serving as the head coach for El Calor de Cancún of the Liga Nacional de Baloncesto Profesional (LNBP) in Mexico.

== Head coaching career ==
=== Latin American clubs ===
García won the 3rd-tier South American Club Championship in 2008, with Club Biguá de Villa Biarritz. He also won the 1st-tier FIBA Americas League championship in 2016, with Guaros de Lara.

=== National teams ===
García coached the Uruguay national team in 2003. He also coached the Argentina national team at the 2012 South American Championship, where they won a gold medal. He has also coached the senior men's Venezuela national team.

As the head coach of Venezuela, he won the gold medal at the 2014 South American Championship, the gold medal at the 2015 FIBA Americas Championship, and the gold medal at the 2016 South American Championship. He also coached Venezuela at the 2016 Summer Olympics.

In 2019, Garcia was hired as head coach of the Dominican Republic national team, where he took the helm prior to their entrance into the 2019 FIBA World Cup.

In 2021, Garcia was reappointed as head coach of the Argentina national team. However, Garcia was abruptly let go a year later, prior to Argentina's arrival at the 2022 FIBA AmeriCup tournament. In September 2022, Garcia reappeared as head coach of the Dominican Republic national team.

=== European clubs ===
On 6 July 2017, García went to Spain, and agreed on a one-year contract term with Montakit Fuenlabrada. This marked the first European club that he worked in as a head coach. After parting ways with the club at the end of the 2017–18 season, he came back to the club in October 2018, in order to replace Agustí Julbe. On April 8, 2026, he took over as head coach for Gran Canaria of the Liga ACB.
