= Miguel Ruiz (basketball) =

Venezuelan basketball player

No. 14 – Obras Sanitarias
- Position: Small forward / power forward

Personal information
- Born: December 20, 1990 (age 35) Caracas, Venezuela
- Listed height: 6 ft 7.5 in (2.02 m)
- Listed weight: 230 lb (104 kg)

Career information
- Playing career: 2012–present

Career history
- 2012: Centauros de Apure
- 2012: Mavort
- 2012: Trotamundos de Carabobo
- 2014: → Sayago
- 2015: → Regatas Corrientes
- 2016-2017: → Libertad Sunchales
- 2019-2020: → Platense
- 2020-2021: → Gimnasia y Esgrima (CR)
- 2022-2023: → Unifacisa Basquete
- 2023: Panteras de Miranda
- 2023: Guaros de Lara
- 2023–present: Obras Sanitarias
Medals
Men's basketball
Representing Venezuela
South American Championship
Gold medal – first place	2014 Venezuela
Gold medal – first place	2016 Venezuela
FIBA AmeriCup
Gold medal – first place	2015 Mexico

Miguel Ruiz (born December 20, 1990) is a Venezuelan professional basketball player for Guaros de Lara of the Superliga Profesional de Baloncesto.

== Professional career ==
In his pro career, Ruiz has played in the 2nd-tier South American League.

On October 10, 2023, Ruiz was announced by Argentine club Obras Sanitarias.

== National team career ==
Ruiz has been a member of the senior men's Venezuelan national basketball team. He played at the 2014 South American Championship, where he won a gold medal, at the 2015 FIBA Americas Championship, where he also won a gold medal, and at the 2016 South American Championship, where he won another gold medal.

He also played with Venezuela at the 2016 Olympic Games.
