= José Echenique =

Venezuelan basketball player

Personal information
- Born: November 28, 1965 (age 60)
- Listed height: 202 cm (6 ft 8 in)

Career information
- Playing career: 19??–2003
- Position: Forward/center

José Echenique (born November 28, 1965, in Caracas) is a retired male basketball player from Venezuela, who played as a power forward during his career. He competed for the Venezuela national basketball team at the 1990 FIBA World Championship.

== Personal life ==
Echenique is the father of Venezuela national team member Gregory Echenique.
