= Paraguay men's national basketball team =

Paraguay
- FIBA ranking: 95 ▼2 (1 September 2026)
- Joined FIBA: 1947
- FIBA zone: FIBA Americas
- National federation: Paraguayan Basketball Federation
- Coach: Eduardo Pfleger

Olympic Games
- Appearances: None

FIBA World Cup
- Appearances: 2
- Medals: None

FIBA AmeriCup
- Appearances: 3
- Medals: None

South American Championship
- Appearances: 32
- Medals: Silver: 1955, 1960; Bronze: 1958
Home	Away

The Paraguay national basketball team is the team governed by the Paraguayan Basketball Federation (Spanish: Confederación Paraguaya de Basquetbol) that represents Paraguay in the men's international basketball competitions organized by the International Basketball Federation (FIBA) and the International Olympic Committee (IOC).

The best achievements by the Paraguay men's national basketball team are the two second-places finishes in the FIBA South America Basketball Championship, in 1955 and 1960.

== Roster ==
Team for the 2016 South American Basketball Championship.

Paraguay men's national basketball team roster
Players
Coaches

Pos.	No.	Name	Age – Date of birth	Height	Club
PF	4	Gabriel Peralta	21 – 21 April 1995	2.01 m (6 ft 7 in)	Deportivo Viedma	(Argentina)
G/F	5	Daniel Pérez	31 – 13 August 1984	1.90 m (6 ft 3 in)	Club Libertad	(Paraguay)
G	6	Carlos Luis Vallejos	24 – 30 January 1992	1.83 m (6 ft 0 in)	Club Libertad	(Paraguay)
SF	7	Bruno Zanotti	33 – 13 September 1982	1.98 m (6 ft 6 in)	Club Libertad	(Paraguay)
SF	8	Edgar Riveros	25 – 2 April 1991	1.84 m (6 ft 0 in)	Sportivo Obreros de Pilar	(Paraguay)
G/F	9	Federico Mellone	31 – 20 January 1985	1.93 m (6 ft 4 in)	Cerro Porteño	(Paraguay)
F	10	Ramón Sánchez	24 – 1 October 1991	1.94 m (6 ft 4 in)	Cerro Porteño	(Paraguay)
F	11	Diego Bareiro	24 – 7 September 1991	1.95 m (6 ft 5 in)	Club Libertad	(Paraguay)
F	12	José Fabio	38 – 31 December 1977	2.00 m (6 ft 7 in)	Comunicaciones de Corrientes	(Argentina)
PG	13	Alejandro Peralta	25 – 17 April 1991	1.93 m (6 ft 4 in)	Deportivo San José	(Paraguay)
F	14	Robertro Latraro	32 – 7 December 1983	1.95 m (6 ft 5 in)	Club Libertad	(Paraguay)
F	15	Adolfo López	27 – 7 May 1989	1.99 m (6 ft 6 in)	Club Félix Pérez Cardozo	(Paraguay)

Head coach

- (Argentina) Eduardo Pfleger

Assistant coach(es)

- (Paraguay) Christian Viveros

Legend

- Club – describes last
  club before the tournament
- Age – describes age
  on 26 July 2016

=== Depth chart ===
Pos.	Starting 5	Bench 1	Bench 2
C	Gabriel Peralta	Adolfo López
PF	Jose Fabio	Federico Mellone	Robertro Latraro
SF	Bruno Zanotti	Ramon Sanchez	Diego Bareiro
SG	Carlos Luis Vallejos	Edgar Riveros
PG	Daniel Perez	Alejandro Peralta

== Notable players ==
Other notable players from Paraguay:

Paraguay roster
Players	Coaches
Pos. / No. / Name / Age – Date of birth / Height / Club / Ctr.; G / / Javier Martínez (basketball) / 37 – 31 August 1978 / 1.88 m (6 ft 2 in) / Regatas Corrientes / (Argentina)

== Competitions ==
=== Olympic Games ===
- Never competed

=== FIBA World Cup ===
Year	Position	Tournament	Host
1954	9	1954 FIBA World Championship	Rio de Janeiro, Brazil
1967	13	1967 FIBA World Championship	4 cities, Uruguay

=== FIBA AmeriCup ===
Year	Position	Tournament	Host
1989	9	1989 Tournament of the Americas	Mexico City, Mexico
2011	10	2011 FIBA Americas Championship	Mar del Plata, Argentina
2013	10	2013 FIBA Americas Championship	Caracas, Venezuela

=== Pan American Games ===
- 1951: 7th
- 2031: Qualified as host

== Results and Fixtures ==
=== 2023 ===
23 June 2025 FIBA AmeriCup qualification	Paraguay	80–70	Barbados	Valdivia, Chile
18:30	Scoring by quarter: 15–16, 21–12, 19–30, 25–12
	Pts: Mercado 33; Rebs: López 8 Asts: Martínez 7	Boxscore	Pts: Alexander 20; Rebs: Thomas 9 Asts: Lockhart, Thomas 3	Arena: Coliseo Municipal Antonio Azurmendy Riveros; Referees: Marcos Benito (BRA), Franco Ronconi (ARG), Gonzalo Salgueiro (URU)

24 June 2025 FIBA AmeriCup qualification	Ecuador	59–66	Paraguay	Valdivia, Chile
21:30	Scoring by quarter: 19–21, 7–18, 16–16, 17–11
	Pts: Castillo 16; Rebs: Castillo 12; Asts: Guerra 5	Boxscore	Pts: Mercado 19; Rebs: Poisson 13; Asts: Martínez 5	Arena: Coliseo Municipal Antonio Azurmendy Riveros; Referees: Juan Fernández (ARG), Fernando Leite (BRA), Gonzalo Salgueiro (URU)

25 June 2025 FIBA AmeriCup qualification	Chile	112–47	Paraguay	Valdivia, Chile
19:00	Scoring by quarter: 24–10, 30–18, 28–4, 30–15
	Pts: Carrasco 18; Rebs: Herrera 6 Asts: Arroyo 6	Boxscore	Pts: Ferreira, Sequera 8 Rebs: Roque 4 Asts: Martínez 5	Arena: Coliseo Municipal Antonio Azurmendy Riveros; Referees: Marcos Benito (BRA), Fernando Leite (BRA), Gonzalo Salgueiro (URU)

=== 2024 ===
23 February 2025 FIBA AmeriCup qualification	Brazil	108–43	Paraguay	São Paulo, Brazil
19:00	Scoring by quarter: 24–10, 21–8, 30–12, 33–13
	Pts: Dos Santos 22; Rebs: Caboclo 9 Asts: Corazza 6	Boxscore	Pts: A. López 9 Rebs: Rivero 5 Asts: Martínez 5	Arena: Ginásio Poliesportivo Wlamir Marques; Attendance: 6,031; Referees: Johnny Batista (PUR), Carlos Vélez (COL), Franco Ronconi (ARG)

26 February 2025 FIBA AmeriCup qualification	Paraguay	53–108	Brazil	Asunción, Paraguay
19:00	Scoring by quarter: 12–25, 13–33, 14–23, 14–27
	Pts: Mercado 17; Rebs: Martínez 5 Asts: Martínez 5	Boxscore	Pts: Dias 20; Rebs: Cardoso 7 Asts: Corazza 10	Arena: SND Arena; Referees: Daniel García (VEN), Kristian Páez (ECU), Franco Anselmo (ARG)

21 November 2025 FIBA AmeriCup qualification	Paraguay	79–116	Panama	Paraguay
		Boxscore

24 November 2025 FIBA AmeriCup qualification	Paraguay	69–86	Uruguay	Paraguay
		Boxscore

=== 2025 ===
21 February 2025 FIBA AmeriCup qualification	Panama	94–68	Paraguay	Panama
		Boxscore

24 February 2025 FIBA AmeriCup qualification	Uruguay	107–60	Paraguay	Uruguay
		Boxscore

== Head coach position ==
- (Spain) Arturo Alvarez – 2010-2012
- (Argentina) Ariel Rearte – 2013-2016
- (Argentina) Eduardo Pfleger - 2016–present

== Kit ==
=== Sponsor ===
2013: Itaú 2016: Tigo

== See also ==
- Paraguay women's national basketball team
- Paraguay men's national under-17 basketball team
