= Luis Barrios =

Peruvian basketball player (born 1990)

Faraday Club
- Position: Point guard
- League: Liga de Basket de Lima

Personal information
- Born: September 21, 1990 (age 36) Moquegua
- Listed height: 6 ft 0 in (1.83 m)

Career information
- Playing career: 2011–present

Career history
- 2015-now: Faraday Club

Luis Barrios (born September 21, 1990), is a Peruvian professional basketball player. He currently plays for the Faraday Club of the Liga de Basket de Lima.

He represented Peru's national basketball team at the 2016 South American Basketball Championship, where he was his team's best passer.
