= Manuel Morales (basketball) =

Peruvian basketball player (born 1987)

Regatas Lima
- Position: Small forward
- League: Liga de Basket de Lima

Personal information
- Born: December 28, 1987 (age 38) Lima, Peru
- Listed height: 6 ft 5 in (1.96 m)

Career information
- Playing career: 2009–present

Career history
- 2016–present: Regatas Lima

Manuel Morales (born December 28, 1987), is a Peruvian professional basketball player. He currently plays for the Regatas Lima club of the Liga de Basket de Lima.

He represented Peru's national basketball team at the 2016 South American Basketball Championship, where he was his team's best three point shooter.
