= 1992 Tournament of the Americas =

Tournament details
- Host country: United States
- City: Portland
- Dates: June 27 - July 5
- Teams: 10
- Venue: 1 (in 1 host city)

Final positions
- Champions: United States (1st title)
- Runners-up: Venezuela
- Third place: Brazil
- Fourth place: Puerto Rico

Tournament statistics
- MVP: Charles Barkley and Magic Johnson

The 1992 Tournament of the Americas, later known as the FIBA Americas Championship and the FIBA AmeriCup, was a basketball championship hosted by the United States from June 27 to July 5, 1992. The games were played at the Memorial Coliseum in Portland, Oregon. This FIBA AmeriCup was to earn the four berths allocated to the Americas for the 1992 Summer Olympics in Barcelona. It was the international debut of the Dream Team, which defeated Venezuela in the final to win the tournament. Puerto Rico and Brazil made the semifinals to also qualify for the Olympics.

== Qualification ==
Eight teams qualified during the qualification tournaments held in their respective zones in 1991; USA and Canada qualified automatically since they are the only two members of the North America zone.

- North America: Canada, United States
- Caribbean and Central America:Cuba, Mexico, Panama, Puerto Rico
- South America: Argentina, Brazil, Uruguay, Venezuela

The draw split the tournament into two groups:

Group A

Argentina
Canada
Cuba
Panama
United States

Group B

Brazil
Mexico
Puerto Rico
Uruguay
Venezuela

== Format ==
- The top three teams from each group advance to the knockout round.
- The winners in the knockout semifinals advanced to the Final and were granted berths in the 1992 Olympic Tournament in Barcelona. The losers figure in a third place playoff and were both also granted berths in the Olympic Tournament.

== Preliminary round ==
| Qualified for the quarterfinals |

=== Group A ===
| Team | Pld | W | L | PF | PA | PD | Pts |
|---|---|---|---|---|---|---|---|
| United States | 4 | 4 | 0 | 481 | 257 | +224 | 8 |
| Canada | 4 | 2 | 2 | 297 | 326 | −29 | 6 |
| Argentina | 4 | 2 | 2 | 334 | 362 | −28 | 6 |
| Panama | 4 | 1 | 3 | 276 | 344 | −68 | 5 |
| Cuba | 4 | 1 | 3 | 274 | 373 | −99 | 5 |

June 27

| Argentina | 94–76 | Panama |

Memorial Coliseum, Portland

June 27

| Cuba | 79–78 | Canada |

Memorial Coliseum, Portland

June 28

| United States | 136–57 | Cuba |

Memorial Coliseum, Portland

June 28

| Canada | 87–80 | Argentina |

Memorial Coliseum, Portland

June 29

| Panama | 86–67 | Cuba |

Memorial Coliseum, Portland

June 29

| United States | 105–61 | Canada |

Memorial Coliseum, Portland

June 30

| United States | 112–52 | Panama |

Memorial Coliseum, Portland

June 30

| Argentina | 73–71 | Cuba |

Memorial Coliseum, Portland

July 1

| United States | 128–87 | Argentina |

Memorial Coliseum, Portland

July 1

| Canada | 71–62 | Panama |

Memorial Coliseum, Portland

=== Group B ===
| Team | Pld | W | L | PF | PA | PD | Pts |
|---|---|---|---|---|---|---|---|
| Brazil | 4 | 4 | 0 | 452 | 333 | +119 | 8 |
| Puerto Rico | 4 | 3 | 1 | 331 | 321 | +10 | 7 |
| Venezuela | 4 | 2 | 2 | 359 | 401 | −42 | 6 |
| Mexico | 4 | 1 | 3 | 328 | 331 | −3 | 5 |
| Uruguay | 4 | 0 | 4 | 367 | 451 | −84 | 4 |

June 27

| Brazil | 95–72 | Puerto Rico |

Memorial Coliseum, Portland

June 27

| Venezuela | 110–97 | Uruguay |

Memorial Coliseum, Portland

June 28

| Brazil | 128–81 | Venezuela |

Memorial Coliseum, Portland

June 28

| Puerto Rico | 64–58 | Mexico |

Memorial Coliseum, Portland

June 29

| Puerto Rico | 104–88 | Uruguay |

Memorial Coliseum, Portland

June 29

| Brazil | 90–87 | Mexico |

Rose Garden, Portland

June 30

| Brazil | 139–93 | Uruguay |

Memorial Coliseum, Portland

June 30

| Venezuela | 88–85 | Mexico |

Memorial Coliseum, Portland

July 1

| Puerto Rico | 91–80 | Venezuela |

Memorial Coliseum, Portland

July 1

| Mexico | 98–89 | Uruguay |

Memorial Coliseum, Portland

== Knockout round ==
=== Championship bracket ===
First round (July 2)
Canada | 72
Venezuela | 76
Puerto Rico | 95
Argentina | 85

Semifinals (July 3)
Brazil | 91
Venezuela | 100
Puerto Rico | 81
United States | 119

Championship (July 5)
Venezuela | 80
United States | 127
Third place (July 5)
Brazil | 93
Puerto Rico | 91

== The final ==
Dream team beat Venezuela easily by 127–80. Topscorers of the game were Carl Herrera with 21 pts, Charles Barkley and Karl Malone with 17 pts, Christian Laettner had 16 and Clyde Drexler 15 with 10 assists.

== Awards ==
=== Player of game ===
This concerns the Dream Team's games held in Portland, Oregon.

- Game 1 vs Cuba: Clyde Drexler (20 pts, 7 assists)
- Game 2 vs Canada:
- Game 3 vs Panama:
- Game 4 vs Argentina: Michael Jordan
- Game 5 vs Puerto Rico: Magic Johnson (16 pts, 6 assists, 4 rebs)
- Game 6 vs Venezuela: Michael Jordan

=== MVP ===
Charles Barkley and Magic Johnson were both named MVPs of the tournament. They both had 16 points average per game. The award was sponsored by Visa a worldwide sponsor of the 1992 Olympics.

=== Assists ===
Magic Johnson was the top assister of the tournament with 54.

1992 Tournament of the Americas winners

United States
First title

== Final standings ==
| Qualified for the 1992 Olympic Tournament |

| Rank | Team | Record |
|---|---|---|
| 1st place, gold medalist(s) | United States | 6–0 |
| 2nd place, silver medalist(s) | Venezuela | 4–3 |
| 3rd place, bronze medalist(s) | Brazil | 5–1 |
| 4 | Puerto Rico | 4–3 |
| 5 | Canada | 2–3 |
| 6 | Argentina | 2–3 |
| 7 | Mexico | 1–3 |
| 8 | Panama | 1–3 |
| 9 | Cuba | 1–3 |
| 10 | Uruguay | 0–4 |

== Sources ==
- 1992 American Olympic Qualifying Tournament for Men, FIBA.com.
- 1992 EDITION at latinbasket.com
