= Dwight Lewis =

American-Venezuelan basketball player

Personal information
- Born: October 7, 1987 (age 39) Maiquetia, Venezuela
- Listed height: 6 ft 6 in (1.98 m)
- Listed weight: 215 lb (98 kg)

Career information
- High school: Archbishop Rummel (Metairie, Louisiana); James E. Taylor (Katy, Texas)
- College: USC (2006–2010)
- NBA draft: 2010: undrafted
- Playing career: 2010–2020
- Position: Shooting guard / small forward

Career history
- 2010–2011: Mureș
- 2011–2013: Trotamundos
- 2013: Estrellas Orientales
- 2013–2018: Trotamundos
- 2018–2019: Gimnasia y Esgrima
- 2019–2020: Trotamundos
Medals
Men's basketball
Representing Venezuela
FIBA AmeriCup
Gold medal – first place	2015 Mexico
FIBA South American Championship
Gold medal – first place	2016 Venezuela

Dwight Alexis Lewis Padron (born October 7, 1987) is an American-Venezuelan former professional basketball player.

== College career ==
Lewis played college basketball at USC, with the USC Trojans.

== Professional career ==
In his pro career, Lewis has played in the 1st-tier FIBA Americas League.

== National team career ==
Lewis represented the senior men's Venezuelan national basketball team at the 2015 FIBA Americas Championship and the 2016 South American Championship, where he won gold medals. He also played at the men's basketball competition at the 2016 Summer Olympics.
