= Diego Bareiro =

Paraguayan basketball player (born 1991)

Diego Bareiro (born 2 September 1991 in Asunción) is a Paraguayan basketball player. He has been a member of the Paraguay men's national basketball team and participated at the 2014 South American Basketball Championship.
