= Nico Carvacho =

American-Chilean basketball player

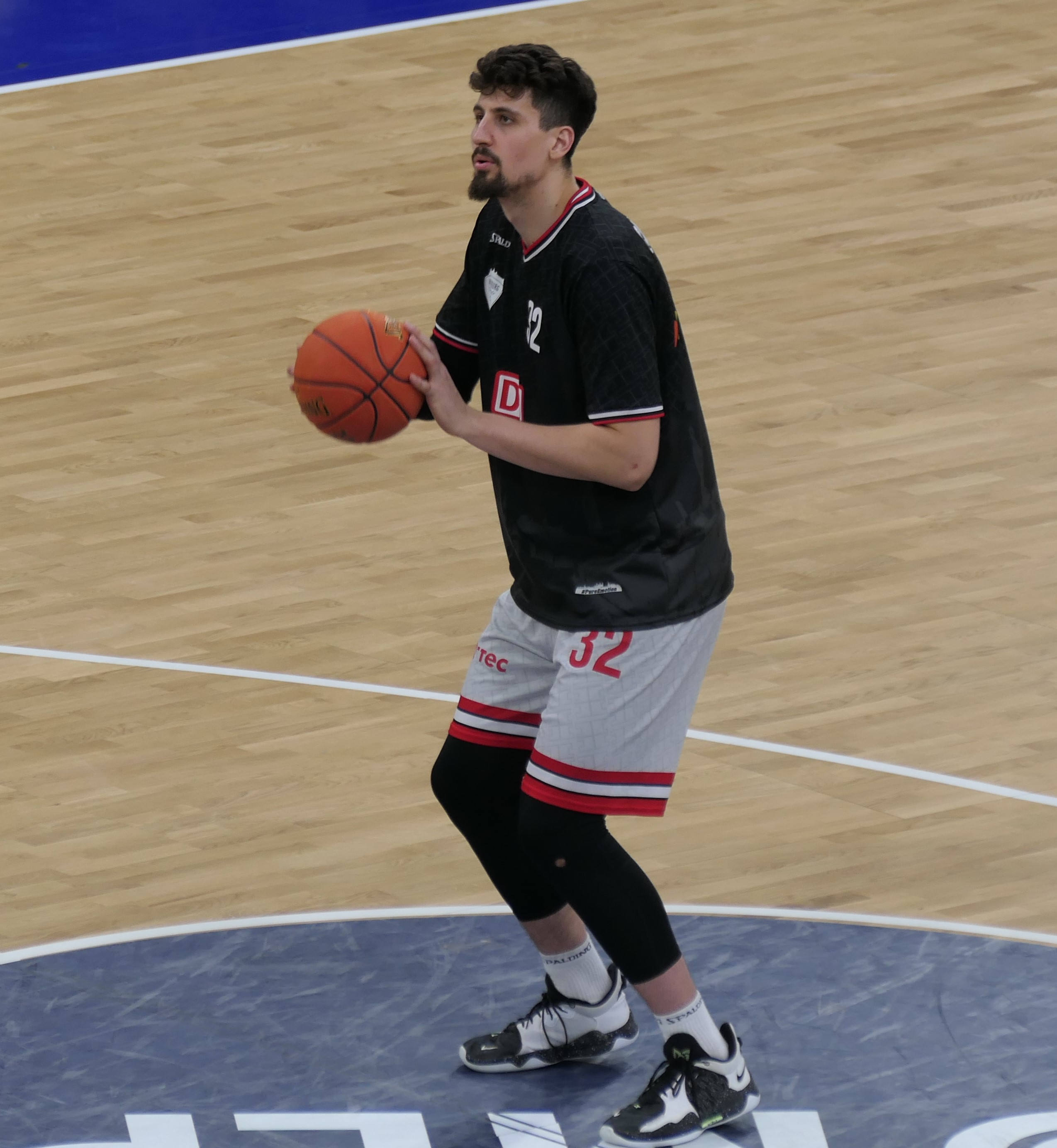
- Carvacho with Würzburg Baskets in 2023

Colorado State Rams
- Title: Graduate assistant
- League: Pac-12 Conference

Personal information
- Born: January 24, 1997 (age 29) Nashville, Tennessee, U.S.
- Listed height: 6 ft 11 in (2.11 m)
- Listed weight: 245 lb (111 kg)

Career information
- High school: Frisco (Frisco, Texas); Sunrise Christian Academy (Bel Aire, Kansas)
- College: Colorado State (2016–2020)
- NBA draft: 2020: undrafted
- Playing career: 2020–2026
- Position: Power forward / center
- Number: 32

Career history

Playing
- 2020–2021: Rilski Sportist
- 2021–2023: s.Oliver Würzburg
- 2023–2024: MKS Dąbrowa Górnicza
- 2024–2025: Benfica
- 2025–2026: Elitzur Netanya

Coaching
- 2026–present: Colorado State (assistant)

Career highlights
- Portuguese League champion (2025); Bulgarian Cup champion (2021); Bulgarian Cup MVP (2021); NCAA rebounding leader (2019); First-team All-Mountain West (2019); Second-team All-Mountain West (2020); Mountain West All-Defensive Team (2019)

Nicolás Eduardo "Nico" Carvacho Bibb (born January 24, 1997) is a Chilean-American former professional basketball player and current graduate assistant coach at Colorado State University. He played college basketball for the Colorado State Rams between 2016 and 2020, and held many school records in rebounding when he graduated.

== Early life ==
Carvacho was born in Nashville, Tennessee. He is the son of Nicole and Eddie Carvacho, a professional soccer coach. Growing up, Carvacho preferred playing soccer to basketball, which he began playing at the age of nine. When he was 15, he moved to his father's native country of Chile to join Universidad Católica as a goalkeeper, where his father had trained to his friend Sebastián Rozental. After five months, he returned to Frisco, Texas and decided to focus on basketball. As a junior at Frisco High School, Carvacho averaged 10 points and 10 rebounds per game and helped the team to a 19–12 record. He transferred to Sunrise Christian Academy for his senior season. Carvacho committed to Colorado State, one of the few schools to offer him a scholarship.

== College career ==
Carvacho redshirted his freshman season. As a redshirt freshman, his game was raw and he picked up quick fouls but showed signs of great rebounding ability. He ended his sophomore season with 16 straight double-doubles. As a sophomore, Carvacho averaged 9.2 points, 10.3 rebounds and 2.2 assists per game for the Rams. After the season, coach Larry Eustachy was fired and Carvacho explored transferring. He received attention from several high-major schools such as Oklahoma and Wisconsin, but ultimately returned to Colorado State.

On December 22, 2018, Carvacho had 23 points and a career-high 22 rebounds in a 64–61 loss to Long Beach State. After averaging 21.5 points and 8.5 rebounds in wins over Air Force and New Mexico, Carvacho was named Mountain West Conference player of the week on January 14, 2019. On February 12, Carvacho surpassed Pat Durham as the all-time leading rebounder at Colorado State. He tied the Mountain West rebounds mark in the season finale. He was named to the First Team All-Mountain West as well as to the league Defensive Team. He averaged 16.1 points and an NCAA Division I-leading 12.9 rebounds per game, and his 409 rebounds broke the school single-season record. After the season, he declared for the 2019 NBA draft but ended up returning to the Rams.

Coming into his senior season, Carvacho was named to the preseason First Team All-Mountain West. On November 5, Carvacho became the Mountain West Conference all-time leading rebounder, grabbing 11 in a win over Denver. He surpassed Jordan Caroline’s 958 career mark. At the conclusion of the regular season, Carvacho was named to the Second Team All-Mountain West. As a senior, Carvacho averaged 12.9 points and 10.8 rebounds per game and had 14 double-doubles.

== Professional career ==
On September 12, 2020, Carvacho signed his first professional contract with Rilski Sportist of the Bulgarian National Basketball League. Carvacho had a great season in the Bulgarian basketball league National Basketball League and was named as best import player and best center of the Bulgarian season 2020–21. He also wheeled Rislki to its third-ever Bulgarian Basketball Cup title and was given MVP honours.

On July 16, 2021, Carvacho signed with s.Oliver Würzburg of the German Basketball Bundesliga.

In July 2024, Carvacho signed with Benfica of the LPB.

Carvacho announced his retirement on 9 August 2026.

== National team career ==
Carvacho is a current member of the Chilean men's national basketball team. In 2013, Carvacho competed for Chile at the FIBA Americas Under-16 Championship in Maldonado, Uruguay, where his team finished in fifth place. In the following year, he represented Chile at the Albert Schweitzer Tournament, an under-18 tournament held in Mannheim, Germany. Carvacho played for the senior team of Chile in the 2016 South American Basketball Championship in Caracas, Venezuela and was named Honorable Mention All-Tournament.

== Career statistics ==
Legend
GP	Games played	GS	Games started	MPG	Minutes per game
FG%	Field goal percentage	3P%	3-point field goal percentage	FT%	Free throw percentage
RPG	Rebounds per game	APG	Assists per game	SPG	Steals per game
BPG	Blocks per game	PPG	Points per game	**Bold**	Career high

=== College ===
Year	Team	GP	GS	MPG	FG%	3P%	FT%	RPG	APG	SPG	BPG	PPG
2015–16	Colorado State	Redshirt										
2016–17	Colorado State	**36**	**33**	21.9	.537	.333	.595	5.7	1.2	.4	.5	5.4
2017–18	Colorado State	32	32	28.7	.507	**.375**	**.608**	10.3	**2.2**	**.7**	**.7**	9.2
2018–19	Colorado State	32	32	**31.9**	**.592**	.000	.491	**12.9**	2.1	.6	**.7**	**16.1**
2019–20	Colorado State	32	32	29.2	.562	.000	.490	10.8	1.8	.8	.6	12.9
Career		132	129	27.8	.558	.333	.531	9.8	1.8	.6	.6	10.7
