= Rodrigo Masias =

Peruvian basketball player (born 1981)

Regatas Lima
- Position: Center
- League: Liga de Basket de Lima

Personal information
- Born: March 11, 1981 (age 45) Lima, Peru
- Listed height: 6 ft 9 in (2.06 m)

Career information
- Playing career: 2000–present

Career history
- 2002–present: Regatas Lima

Rodrigo Masias (born March 11, 1981), is a Peruvian professional basketball player. He currently plays for the Regatas Lima club of the Liga de Basket de Lima.

He represented Peru's national basketball team at the 2016 South American Basketball Championship, where he was his team's best shot blocker.
