= David Cubillán =

Venezuelan basketball player (born 1987)

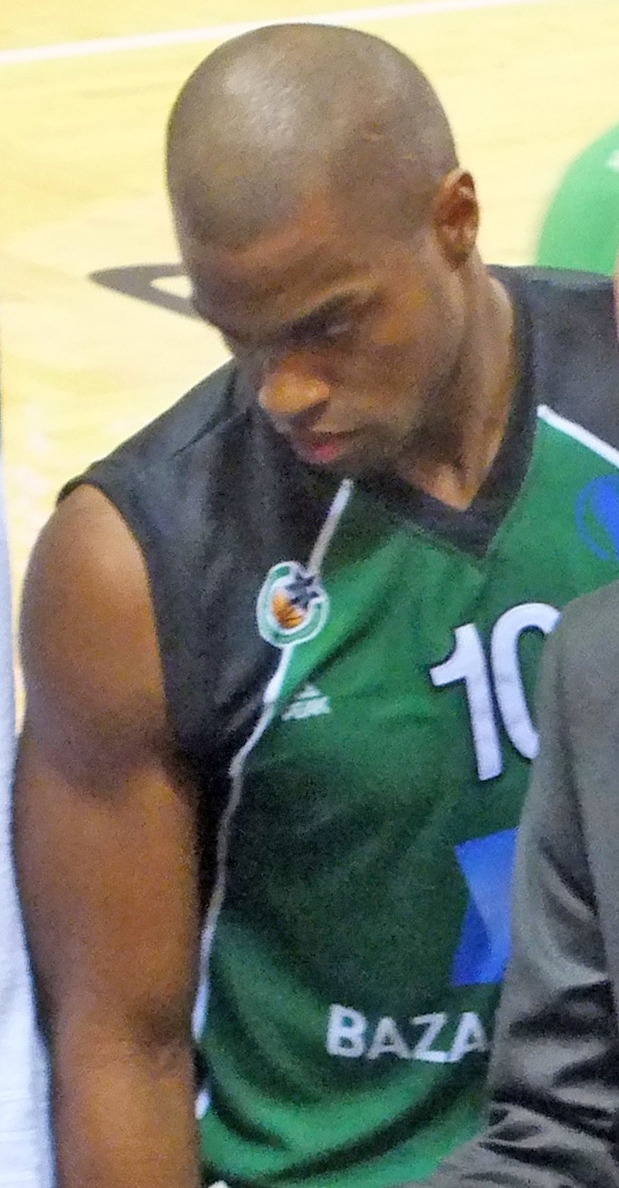

No. 8 – Trotamundos de Carabobo
- Position: Point guard
- League: Superliga Profesional de Baloncesto

Personal information
- Born: July 27, 1987 (age 39) Maracaibo, Venezuela
- Listed height: 6 ft 0 in (1.83 m)
- Listed weight: 175 lb (79 kg)

Career information
- High school: Saint Benedict's Preparatory School (Newark, New Jersey)
- College: Marquette (2006–2010)
- NBA draft: 2010: undrafted
- Playing career: 2010–present

Career history
- 2010: Espartanos de Margarita
- 2011: Trotamundos de Carabobo
- 2011–2012: Soles de Mexicali
- 2012–2013: Trotamundos de Carabobo
- 2013–2014: Maccabi Haifa
- 2014: Maccabi Ashdod
- 2014–2015: Trotamundos de Carabobo
- 2015: Guaros de Lara
- 2015–2017: Trotamundos de Carabobo
- 2017–2018: Flamengo
- 2018–2019: Guaros de Lara
- 2018–2019: Trotamundos de Carabobo
- 2019–2020: Fuerza Regia de Monterrey
- 2020–2021: CB Peñas Huesca
- 2021: Trotamundos de Carabobo
- 2021–2022: Unifacisa Basquete
- 2022: Trotamundos de Carabobo
- 2022: Caribbean Storm Islands
- 2022: Titanes de Barranquilla
- 2023: Goes
- 2023: Guaiqueríes de Margarita
- 2023: Abejas de León
- 2024: Halcones de Xalapa
- 2024: Dorados de Chihuahua
- 2025–present: Trotamundos de Carabobo
Medals
Men's basketball
Representing Venezuela
FIBA South American Championship
Gold medal – first place	2014 Isla Margarita
Gold medal – first place	2016 Venezuela
Silver medal – second place	2012 Argentina
FIBA AmeriCup
Gold medal – first place	2015 Mexico City

David Alejandro Cubillán León (born July 27, 1987) is a Venezuelan professional basketball player for the Trotamundos de Carabobo of the Superliga Profesional de Baloncesto (SPB). He played college basketball with the Marquette Golden Eagles, where he was a key part of Marquette's bench play.

== College career ==
While at Marquette, Cubillán was the first man off the bench, backing up starting point guard, Dominic James. As a freshman, he scored a career-high 20 points, in a 75–71 win over Pittsburgh, on March 3, 2007.

== Professional career ==
In July 2013, Cubillán signed with Maccabi Haifa of the Israeli Basketball Premier League. However, he was released from the roster that season, and moved to the Israeli club Maccabi Ashdod. He finished that 2013–14 season, playing with his third team of that season, Trotamundos de Carabobo, on the Venezuelan professional league, where he is considered to be one of the best point guards in the league. In August 2017, Cubillan announced that he is going to play in Brazilian league, using the colors of Flamengo.

He later returned to Trotamundos.

== National team career ==
With the senior men's Venezuelan national basketball team, Cubillán has won the gold medal at the 2014 South American Championship, the 2015 FIBA Americas Championship, and the 2016 South American Championship. He also won a silver medal at the 2012 South American Championship.

He also played at the 2016 Summer Olympics.

== Player profile ==
Cubillán's strengths as a player, include his quickness, and his ability to shoot the three-point shot at a high percentage.
