= Raul Salvatierra =

Bolivian basketball player (born 1991)

Gimnasia y Esgrima
- Position: Center
- League: Torneo Nacional de Ascenso

Personal information
- Born: July 15, 1991 (age 35) Beni, Bolivia
- Listed height: 6 ft 7 in (2.01 m)

Career information
- Playing career: 2015–present

Career history
- 2017–present: Gimnasia y Esgrima (Argentina)

Raul Salvatierra (born July 15, 1991) is a Bolivian professional basketball player. He currently plays for Gimnasia y Esgrima of the Torneo Nacional de Ascenso in Argentina.

He was a member of Bolivia's national basketball team at the 2016 South American Basketball Championship in Caracas, Venezuela. There, he was Bolivia's best rebounder.
