= Sebastián Suárez (basketball) =

Chilean basketball player (born 1991)

Sebastian Suarez
Español de Osorno
- Position: Guard
- League: LNB Chile

Personal information
- Born: March 1, 1991 (age 35) Ancud, Chile
- Listed height: 6 ft 4 in (1.93 m)

Career information
- College: Portland State (2013–2015)
- Playing career: 2015–present

Career history
- 2015–2016: Club Deportivo Valdivia
- 2016–2017: Penarol Mar del Plata
- 2017–2020: ABA Ancud
- 2019: Panteras de Miranda
- 2020–2021: Club Deportivo Valdivia
- 2021–2022: Español de Osorno
- 2022–2023: ABA Ancud
- 2023–present: Español de Osorno

Sebastian Suarez (born March 1, 1991), is a Chilean professional basketball player. He currently plays for Búcaros de Bucaramanga of the Liga colombiana de baloncesto .

In the 2016-17 season, he played for the Penarol Mar del Plata club of the Argentinean Liga Nacional de Básquet.

He represented Chile's national basketball team at the 2016 South American Basketball Championship, where he recorded most minutes and steals for his team.

Sebastian is the son of legendary Chilean national basketball team player Luis "Caco" Suarez.
