= Gregory Vargas =

Venezuelan basketball player (born 1986)

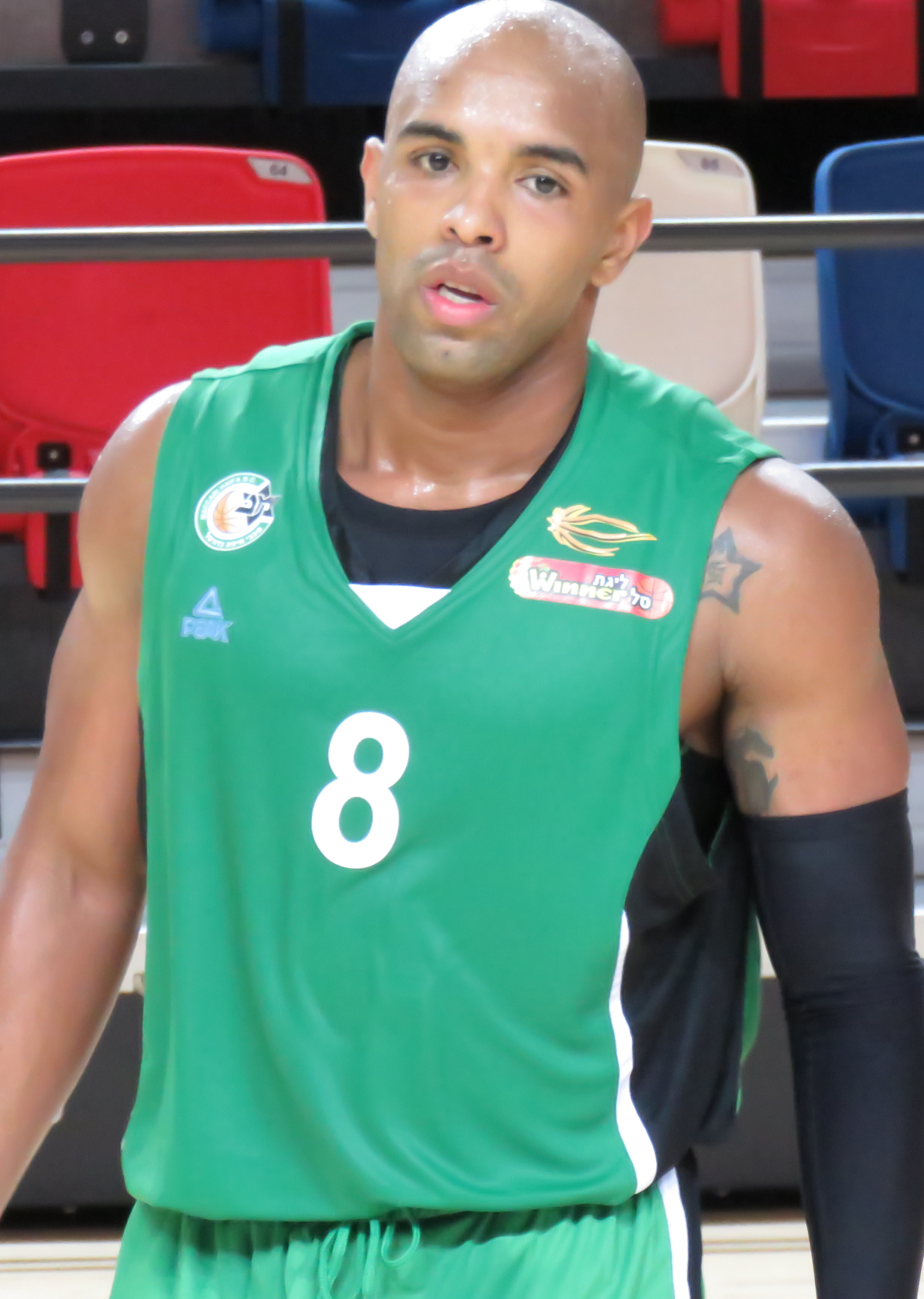
- Vargas with Maccabi Haifa in 2015

Personal information
- Born: 18 February 1986 (age 40) Ocumare Del Tuy, Venezuela
- Listed height: 1.80 m (5 ft 11 in)
- Listed weight: 91 kg (201 lb)

Career information
- NBA draft: 2008: undrafted
- Playing career: 2004–present
- Position: Point guard

Career history
- 2004: Patriotas de Guarico
- 2004–2005: Pescadores de Cumana
- 2005–2008: Panteras de Miranda
- 2006–2007: Pescadores de Sucre
- 2008–2016: Marinos de Anzoátegui
- 2008: Centauros de Cojedes
- 2008: Petroleros de Falcon
- 2008–2011: Angeles de Puebla
- 2009: Piratas Saludcoop Bogota
- 2009: Lanceros de Cojedes
- 2009: Tiburones de Vargas
- 2011: Reales de La Vega
- 2011–2012: Halcones Rojos Veracruz
- 2012–2013: Halcones UV Xalapa
- 2013: Caquetíos de Falcón
- 2014: Brujos de Guayama
- 2014: Maratonistas de Coamo
- 2014: Protectores de Miranda
- 2015–2016: Maccabi Haifa
- 2016: SLUC Nancy
- 2016–2017: Maccabi Haifa
- 2017–2018: Baloncesto Fuenlabrada
- 2018–2019: Guaros de Lara
- 2019–2020: Maccabi Haifa
- 2020–2021: U-BT Cluj-Napoca
- 2021: Cocodrilos de Caracas
- 2021–2022: Hapoel Haifa
- 2022–2025: Gladiadores de Anzoátegui
- 2025: El Calor de Cancún

Career highlights
- Venezuelan League champion (2021); Venezuelan League MVP (2021); 2× Israeli League All-Star (2016, 2017); 2× Israeli Premier League Defensive Player of the Year (2016, 2017); 3× Israeli Premier League assists Leader (2017, 2020, 2022); FIBA South American Championship MVP (2016)
Medals
Men's basketball
Representing Venezuela
FIBA South American Championship
Gold medal – first place	2014 Venezuela
Gold medal – first place	2016 Venezuela
Silver medal – second place	2012 Argentina
FIBA AmeriCup
Gold medal – first place	2015 Mexico

Gregory Maxdier Vargas Díaz (born 18 February 1986) is a Venezuelan professional basketball player who last played for Hapoel Haifa of the Israeli Basketball Premier League. He was the Israeli Basketball Premier League Defensive Player of the Year in 2016 and 2017, and the Israeli Premier League Assists Leader in 2017 and 2020.

== Professional career ==
In the 2015–16 season, Vargas averaged 13.9 points and 6.4 assists per game in the Israeli Premier League, with Maccabi Haifa.

Vargas also played against the NBA's Memphis Grizzlies as a part of Maccabi Haifa, in an NBA preseason game. He scored over 20 points in 8 games, and had 10 or more assists in 3 games as well, during the 2015–16 season.

On 7 July 2016, Vargas signed with French club SLUC Nancy. In November 2016, he left Nancy after appearing in eight games.

On 17 December 2016, he returned to his former club Maccabi Haifa., During his season with the club he won Israeli Super League Defensive Player of the Year award and helped Haifa reaching the Israeli League Finals. He was the Israeli Basketball Premier League Defensive Player of the Year in 2016 and 2017. He was also the Israeli Premier League Assists Leader in 2017.

On 20 July 2017, Vargas signed with the Spanish club Baloncesto Fuenlabrada of the Liga ACB for the 2017–18 season.

On 1 August 2019, Vargas returned to Maccabi Haifa for a third stint, signing a one-year deal. On 3 February 2020, Vargas recorded a triple-double 16 points, 12 rebounds and 13 assists, leading Haifa to a 93–84 win over Hapoel Gilboa Galil. He was subsequently named Israeli League Round 18 MVP. He was the Israeli Premier League Assists Leader in 2019–20.

On 2 July 2020, he signed with U-BT Cluj-Napoca of the Romanian Liga Națională.

Vargas played with Cocodrilos de Caracas in the 2021 season of the Venezuelan SuperLiga and was named the league MVP after averaging 17.4 points and 7.7 assists for the team.

== National team career ==
Vargas is a member of the senior men's Venezuelan national basketball team. As a member of the team at the 2015 FIBA Americas Championship, he helped Venezuela to defeat Uruguay and Canada to win the gold medal. That was Venezuela's first FIBA Americas Championship, and allowed them to qualify for the 2016 Summer Olympics in Rio, where Vargas also played with Venezuela.

== Player profile ==
Vargas was described as a tough FIBA player, who could be a college basketball All-American, by ESPN basketball analyst Fran Fraschilla.

== Personal ==
Vargas' older brother José is also a professional basketball player. The two brothers have played together on the senior men's Venezuelan national team.
