= Daniel Pérez (basketball) =

Paraguayan basketball player

Daniel Pérez (born 13 August 1984 in Asunción) is a Paraguayan basketball player.

He has been a member of the Paraguay men's national basketball team since 2003, and participated in five South American Basketball Championships and the 2011 FIBA Americas Championship.
