= Juan Fontena =

Chilean basketball player (born 1987)

Marinos de Oriente
- Position: Power forward / center
- League: Superliga Profesional de Baloncesto

Personal information
- Born: February 15, 1987 (age 39) Carupano, Venezuela
- Listed height: 6 ft 5 in (1.96 m)

Career information
- Playing career: 2007–present

Career history
- 2014: Club Deportes Castro (Chile)
- 2016: Osorno Básquetbol (Chile)
- 2019: Club Deportivo Valdivia (Chile)
- 2019: Club Deportes Castro (Chile)
- 2020: Club Deportivo Social y Cultural Puerto Varas (Chile)
- 2023: ABA Ancud (Chile)
- 2024: Marinos de Oriente (Venezuela)

Juan Fontena (born February 15, 1987), is a Venezuelan professional basketball player. He currently plays for the Marinos de Oriente club of the Superliga Profesional de Baloncesto de Venezuela.

He represented Chile's national basketball team at the 2016 South American Basketball Championship, where he recorded most blocks for his team.
