= Club Comunicaciones (Mercedes) =

Comunicaciones (Corrientes)
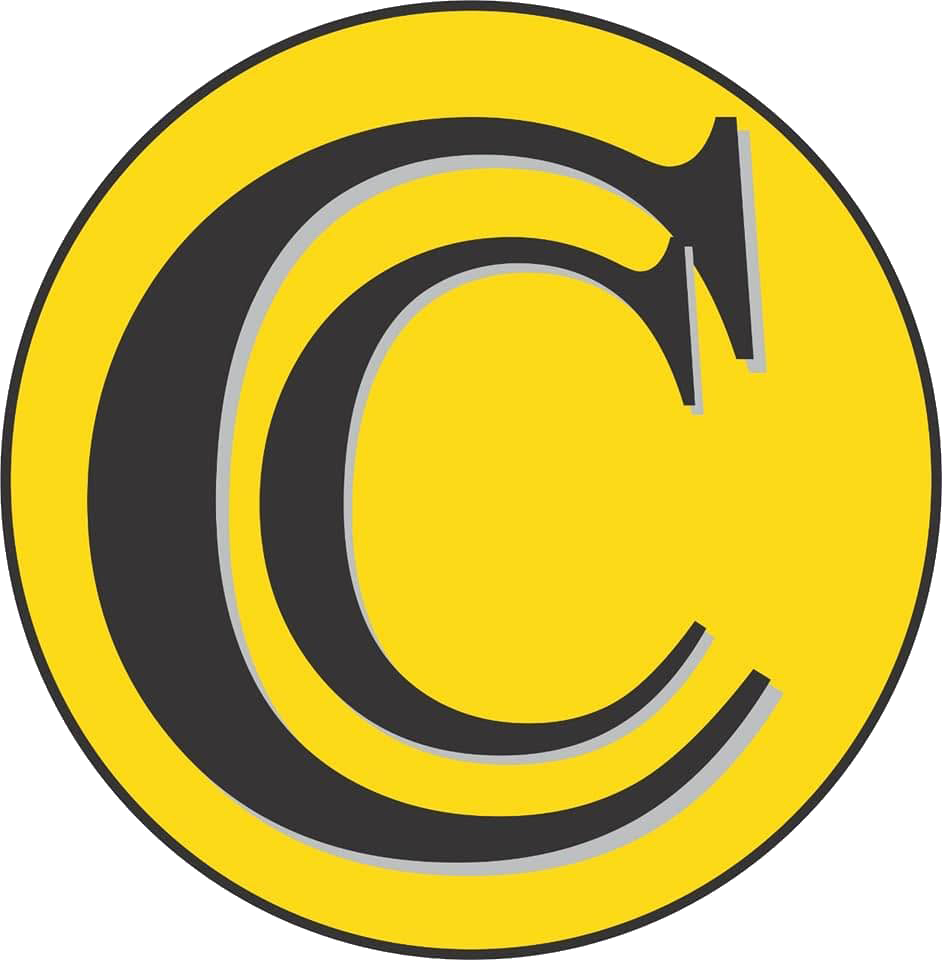
- Leagues: LAB
- Founded: June 20, 1957; 69 years ago
- Arena: Estadio de Comunicaciones
- Capacity: 3,500
- Location: Mercedes, Corrientes, Argentina
- Team colors
- President: Mario Fernández
Home	Away

Club Comunicaciones is an Argentine sports club located in the city of Mercedes in Corrientes Province. Founded n 1957, the club is mostly known for its basketball team, which currently plays in the La Liga Argentina de Básquet (LLA), the second division of the Argentine league system.

The club is internationally known because some of its players have represented their South American national teams at the FIBA Americas Championship.

Apart from basketball, Comunicaciones also has a football section, which team competes in tournaments organised by regional Liga Mercedina de Fútbol [es]. At national level, Comunicaciones played the 2017 Torneo Federal C [es], another regional football competition.

== Players ==
=== Current roster ===
Comunicaciones roster
Players
Coaches

Pos.	No.	Nat.	Name	Ht.	Wt.	Age
C	0	(United States)	Crawford, Chaz	2.07 m (6 ft 9 in)		42 – 12 April 1984
SF	4	(Argentina)	Gerlero, Miguel	1.94 m (6 ft 4 in)		37 – 9 February 1989
PG	10	(Argentina)	Cequeira, Luis	1.80 m (5 ft 11 in)		41 – 4 February 1985
SF	13	(United States)	Gadson, Novar	2.01 m (6 ft 7 in)		36 – 19 December 1989
C	14	(Argentina)	Bortolín, Matías	2.06 m (6 ft 9 in)		33 – 11 April 1993
SG	15	(Argentina)	Safar, Selem	1.92 m (6 ft 4 in)		39 – 6 May 1987
PF	93	(Argentina)	Fierro, Mariano	2.00 m (6 ft 7 in)		40 – 13 June 1986

Head coach

- (Argentina) Ariel Rearte

Legend

- (C) Team captain
- Injured

- Roster
Updated: 2020–02–01

=== Notable players ===
- (Argentina) Luis Cequeira
- (Paraguay) Jose Fabio
- (United States) Jordan Adams
