= José Fabio =

Argentinean basketball player

Comunicaciones Mercedes
- Positions: Small forward Power forward
- League: Torneo Nacional de Ascenso

Personal information
- Born: December 31, 1977 (age 48) Obera, Misiones, Argentina
- Listed height: 6 ft 7 in (2.01 m)

Career information
- Playing career: 2003–present

Career history
- 2008–11 2012–14: Obera Tennis Club
- 2015–: Comunicaciones Mercedes

José Manuel Fabio (born 31 December 1977) is a Paraguayan professional basketball player. He currently plays for the Comunicaciones Mercedes Sports Club of the Torneo Nacional de Ascenso in Argentina.

He has been a member of the Paraguayan national basketball team and participated at the 2014 South American Basketball Championship, where he averaged most minutes, points, rebounds and blocks for his team.
