= Erik Carrasco =

Chilean basketball player (born 1983)

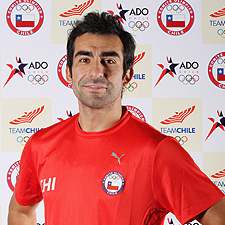

CD Valdivia
- Position: Guard
- League: Liga Nacional de Básquetbol de Chile

Personal information
- Born: May 18, 1983 (age 43) Santiago, Chile
- Listed height: 6 ft 0 in (1.83 m)

Career information
- Playing career: 1999–present

Career history
- 2015–present: Club Deportivo Valdivia

Erik "Cachete" Fernando Carrasco Follert (born May 18, 1983), is a Chilean professional basketball player. He currently plays for the Club Deportivo Valdivia club of the Liga Nacional de Básquetbol de Chile, the country's top professional basketball league.

He represented Chile's national basketball team at the 2016 South American Basketball Championship in Caracas, Venezuela, where he recorded most assists and steals for Chile.
