= Venezuela men's national basketball team =

Venezuela
- FIBA ranking: 34 ▼7 (1 September 2026)
- Joined FIBA: 1938
- FIBA zone: FIBA Americas
- National federation: Venezuelan Basketball Federation
- Coach: Alexis Cedres
- Nickname: La Vinotinto de las alturas

Olympic Games
- Appearances: 2

FIBA World Cup
- Appearances: 5

FIBA AmeriCup
- Appearances: 18
- Medals: Gold: (2015); Silver: (1992); Bronze: (2005)
Home	Away

The Venezuela national basketball team is organized and run by the Venezuelan Basketball Federation (FVB). (Spanish: Federación Venezolana de Baloncesto) They won the 2015 FIBA AmeriCup.

Venezuela qualified for two Summer Olympiads: 1992, and then 2016. Venezuela hosted the 2012 FIBA Olympic Qualifying Tournament, the country's most prestigious basketball event ever. Later, the country also hosted the 2013 FIBA AmeriCup.

Venezuela has participated in international competitions: International Basketball Federation (FIBA), Summer Olympic Games, the FIBA World Cup, the South American Championship, the Pan American Games and the Bolivarian Games.

== Honours ==
- FIBA AmeriCup

Winners: 2015

== Achievements ==
=== Summer Olympics ===
Year	Position	Tournament	Host
1992	11	1992 Summer Olympics	Barcelona, Spain
2016	10	2016 Summer Olympics	Rio de Janeiro, Brazil

=== FIBA Basketball World Cup ===
Year	Position	Tournament	Host
1990	11	1990 FIBA World Championship	Argentina
2002	14	2002 FIBA World Championship	Indianapolis, United States
2006	23	2006 FIBA World Championship	Japan
2019	14	2019 FIBA Basketball World Cup	China
2023	30	2023 FIBA Basketball World Cup	Philippines, Japan and Indonesia

=== FIBA AmeriCup ===
Year	Position	Tournament	Host
1988	7	1988 Tournament of the Americas	Montevideo, Uruguay
1989	4	1989 Tournament of the Americas	Mexico City, Mexico
1992	2nd place, silver medalist(s)	1992 Tournament of the Americas	Portland, United States
1993	6	1993 Tournament of the Americas	San Juan, Puerto Rico
1995	9	1995 Tournament of the Americas	Tucumán, Argentina
1997	7	1997 FIBA Americas Championship	Montevideo, Uruguay
1999	5	1999 FIBA Americas Championship	San Juan, Puerto Rico
2001	5	2001 FIBA Americas Championship	Neuquén, Argentina
2003	5	2003 FIBA Americas Championship	San Juan, Puerto Rico
2005	3rd place, bronze medalist(s)	2005 FIBA Americas Championship	Santo Domingo, Dominican Republic
2007	8	2007 FIBA Americas Championship	Las Vegas, United States
2009	9	2009 FIBA Americas Championship	San Juan, Puerto Rico
2011	5	2011 FIBA Americas Championship	Mar del Plata, Argentina
2013	5	2013 FIBA Americas Championship	Caracas, Venezuela
2015	1st place, gold medalist(s)	2015 FIBA Americas Championship	Mexico City, Mexico
2017	9	2017 FIBA AmeriCup	four cities in Argentina, Colombia, Uruguay
2021	7	2022 FIBA AmeriCup	Recife, Brazil
2025	9	2025 FIBA AmeriCup	Managua, Nicaragua

=== Pan American Games ===
- 1955 – 6th
- 1975 – 8th
- 1983 – 8th
- 1987 – 8th
- 1991 – 10th
- 2015 – 7th
- 2019 – 5th
- 2023 – (silver)

=== FIBA South American Championship ===
- 1961 – 8th
- 1979 – 5th
- 1985 – 4th
- 1987 – (silver)
- 1991 – (gold)
- 1993 – (bronze)
- 1995 – 4th
- 1997 – (silver)
- 1999 – (bronze)
- 2001 – (bronze)
- 2003 – 4th
- 2004 – (bronze)
- 2006 – 4th
- 2008 – (bronze)
- 2010 – 4th
- 2012 – (silver)
- 2014 – (gold)
- 2016 – (gold)

=== Bolivarian Games ===
- 1961 – (bronze)
- 1970 – (bronze)
- 1977 – (gold)
- 1981 – (silver)
- 1985 – (silver)
- 1997 – (gold)
- 2001 – (gold)
- 2005 – (silver)
- 2009 – (gold)
- 2013 – (gold)
- 2017 – (silver)

== Team ==
=== Current roster ===
Roster for the 2025 FIBA AmeriCup.

Venezuela men's national basketball team roster
Players
Coaches

Pos.	No.	Name	Age – Date of birth	Height	Club	Ctr.
PG	2	Edwin Mijares	32 – 27 October 1992	1.82 m (6 ft 0 in)	Toros de Aragua	(Venezuela)
G	3	Yeferson Guerra	22 – 6 July 2003	1.88 m (6 ft 2 in)	Unión de Santa Fe	(Argentina)
PG	8	David Cubillán (C)	38 – 27 July 1987	1.82 m (6 ft 0 in)	Trotamundos de Carabobo	(Venezuela)
PF	12	Elian Centeno	25 – 18 July 2000	2.02 m (6 ft 8 in)	Pioneros del Ávila	(Venezuela)
SF	13	José Ascanio	29 – 10 January 1996	2.02 m (6 ft 8 in)	Ciclista Olímpico	(Argentina)
C	15	Windi Graterol	38 – 10 September 1986	2.04 m (6 ft 8 in)	Spartans Distrito Capital	(Argentina)
SF	16	Anyelo Cisneros	28 – 31 January 1997	1.98 m (6 ft 6 in)	Gimnasia y Esgrima	(Argentina)
PG	20	Yohanner Sifontes	30 – 19 August 1995	1.90 m (6 ft 3 in)	Spartans Distrito Capital	(Venezuela)
G	21	Franger Pirela	22 – 19 December 2002	1.82 m (6 ft 0 in)	CB La Matanza	(Spain)
PF	27	Fernando Fuenmayor	25 – 5 April 2000	2.01 m (6 ft 7 in)	Trotamundos de Carabobo	(Venezuela)
SG	28	Carlos Daniel Fulda Carrera	23 – 23 July 2002	1.85 m (6 ft 1 in)	Gladiadores de Anzoátegui	(Venezuela)
C	77	Enrique Medina	21 – 31 January 2004	2.18 m (7 ft 2 in)	CB Santfeliuenc	(Spain)

Head coach

- (Venezuela) Ronald Guillén

Assistant coach(es)

- (Venezuela) Alexis Cedres
- (Venezuela) Yonaiker Ecker
- (Venezuela) Diego Vásquez

Legend

- (C) Team captain
- Club – describes last
  club before the tournament
- Age – describes age
  on 22 August 2025

=== Notable players ===
Other notable players from Venezuela:

Venezuela roster
Players
Coaches

Pos.	No.	Name	Age – Date of birth	Height	Club
SF		Donta Smith	33 – 27 November 1983	2.01 m (6 ft 7 in)	Elan Bearnais	(France)
G		Greivis Vásquez	30 – 16 January 1987	1.98 m (6 ft 6 in)	Free agent

Legend

- Club – describes current club
- Age – describes age
  on 11 July 2017

=== Head coach position ===
- (Venezuela) Jesus Cordobés: 1990
- (Puerto Rico) Julio Toro: 1992
- (Argentina) Guillermo Vecchio: 1998
- (Venezuela) Bruno D'Adezzio: 1999
- (United States) Jim Calvin: 2002
- (Venezuela) Néstor Salazar: 2003–2007
- (Venezuela) Nelson Solórzano: 2008
- (Venezuela) Nestor Salazar: 2009–2010
- (United States) Eric Musselman: 2011–2012
- (Argentina) Che García: 2013–2017
- (Argentina) Fernando Duró: 2018–2023
- (Venezuela) Daniel Seoane: 2023–2025
- (Venezuela) Ronald Guillén: 2025
- (Spain) Curro Segura: 2025–2026
- (Venezuela) Alexis Cedres: 2026–present

=== Past rosters ===
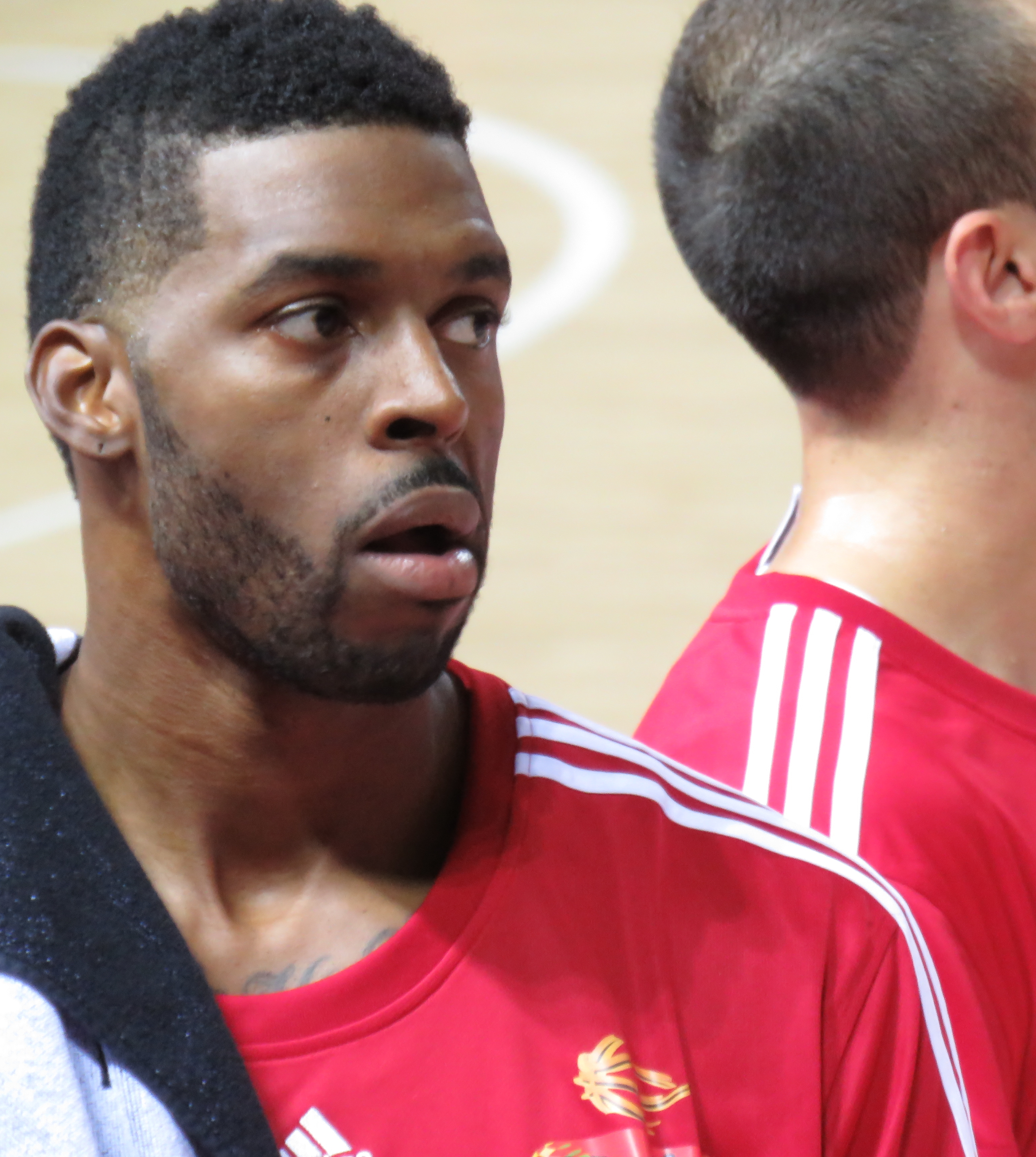
Donta Smith

1990 World Championship: finished 11th among 16 teams

4 David Díaz, 5 Cesar Portillo, 6 Armando Becker, 7 Nelson Solorzano, 8 Rostin González, 9 Luis Jiménez, 10 Sam Shepherd, 11 Carl Herrera, 12 José Echenique, 13 Gabriel Estaba, 14 Iván Olivares, 15 Alexander Nelcha (Coach: Jesus Cordobés)

1992 Olympic Games: finished 11th among 12 teams

4 Víctor Díaz, 5 David Diaz, 6 Melquiades Jaramillo, 7 Nelson Solorzano, 8 Rostin González, 9 Luis Jiménez, 10 Sam Shepherd, 11 Carl Herrera, 12 Omar Walcott, 13 Gabriel Estaba, 14 Iván Olivares, 15 Alexander Nelcha (Coach: Julio Toro)

2002 World Championship: finished 14th among 16 teams

4 Víctor Díaz, 5 Pablo Ezequiel Machado, 6 Yumerving Ernesto Mijares, 7 Richard Lugo, 8 Alejandro "Alex" Quiroz, 9 Óscar Torres, 10 Diego Guevara, 11 Carl Herrera, 12 Héctor "Pepito" Romero, 13 Vladimir Heredia, 14 Tomas Aguilera, 15 Carlos Morris (Coach: Jim Calvin)

2006 World Championship: finished 21st among 24 teams

4 Víctor Díaz, 5 Pablo Machado, 6 Yumerving Ernesto Mijares, 7 Richard Lugo, 8 Tomás Aguilera, 9 Óscar Torres, 10 Carlos Alberto Cedeno, 11 Miguel Marriaga, 12 Gregory Vallenilla, 13 Manuel Alejandro Barrios, 14 Heberth Alberto Bayona, 15 Carlos Morris (Coach: Néstor Salazar)

== See also ==
- Venezuela men's national under-19 basketball team
- Venezuela men's national 3x3 team
- Venezuela women's national basketball team
