= Liga de Basket de Lima =

Regional basketball league in Peru

- Sport: Basketball
- Founded: 1997
- No. of teams: 9
- Country: Peru
- Most recent champion: Regatas Lima (17th title) (2026 Apertura)
- Most titles: Regatas Lima (17 titles)
- Website: Liga de Basket de Lima

The Liga de Basket de Lima (LBL) is a regional basketball league in Peru. It is contested between teams from Lima. It is held since 1997.

Until 2011, it was the most important basketball championship in Peru. Since 2011, the annual winners of this league qualify for Peru's National Basketball League.

== Champions ==
=== Men's Competition ===
Season	Champion
1997	EOFAP
1998	
1999	Universidad Alas Peruanas
2000	Universidad Alas Peruanas
2001	Universidad de Lima
2002	Regatas Lima
2003	Regatas Lima
2004	Regatas Lima
2005	Regatas Lima
2006	Escuela Militar de Chorrillos
2007	Regatas Lima
2008	Regatas Lima
2009	Regatas Lima
2010	Regatas Lima
2011	Country Club El Bosque
2012	Country Club El Bosque
2013	Real Club de Lima
2014	Real Club de Lima
2015	Real Club de Lima
2016	Regatas Lima
2017	Regatas Lima
2018 Apertura	EOFAP
2018 Clausura	EOFAP
2019 Apertura	Regatas Lima
2019 Clausura	Regatas Lima
2020	Canceled due to the COVID-19 pandemic
2021	Canceled due to the COVID-19 pandemic
2022	Lima Norte Basketball Club
2023 Apertura	Regatas Lima
2023 Clausura	Regatas Lima
2024	Dinosaurios
2025 Apertura	Regatas Lima
2025 Clausura	Regatas Lima
2026 Apertura	Regatas Lima
