= 2024–25 LUB season =

Uruguayan professional basketball season

Liga Uruguaya de Básquetbol
- Season: 2024–25
- Dates: 24 October 2024 – 1 June 2025
- Games played: 196
- Teams: 14

Regular season
- Top seed: Nacional
- Season MVP: (Uruguay) Patricio Prieto
- Relegated: Trouville; Urupan

Finals
- Champions: Nacional; 1st LUB title 3rd Uruguayan title
- Runners-up: Aguada
- Semi-finalists: Malvín; Defensor Sporting
- Finals MVP: (Uruguay) Patricio Prieto

Statistical leaders
Points	(Colombia) Álvaro Peña	28.5
Rebounds	(United States) Cobie Barnes	12.0
Assists	(Uruguay) Santiago Vidal	7.7

Records
- Biggest home win: Nacional 115–64 Welcome (1 November 2024) (Note: Nacional also beat Hebraica y Macabi 115–64 on April 18 at the Polideportivo del Gran Parque Central, but for official purposes, it is considered an away game, as they exchanged home court with their rival, in games 2 and 3 of the quarterfinals.)
- Biggest away win: Urupan 65–121 Nacional (3 February 2024)
- Highest scoring: Welcome 111–120 Defensor Sporting (5 December 2024)
- Winning streak: 14 games Nacional (Note: This is the longest winning streak at the start of a tournament.)
- Losing streak: 12 games Trouville

The 2024–25 LUB season, was the 22nd season of the top Uruguayan professional basketball league, since its establishment in 2003. It began with Malvín's victory over Biguá for the regular season, on 24 October 2024, and ended on 1 June 2025, with the seventh game of the finals.

Nacional was the champion, beating the defending champion, Aguada, in a historic series being the first team to comeback after a 1–3 in finals.

== Teams ==
=== Promotion and relegation (pre-season) ===
A total of 14 teams contested the league, including 10 sides from the 2023–24 season, two promoted from the 2023 El Metro and two qualified from the OBL.

Teams promoted from El Metro

- Urunday Universitario
- Welcome

Teams relegated to Liga de Ascenso

- Larre Borges
- Goes

=== Venues and locations ===
Location of teams in 2024–25 LUB
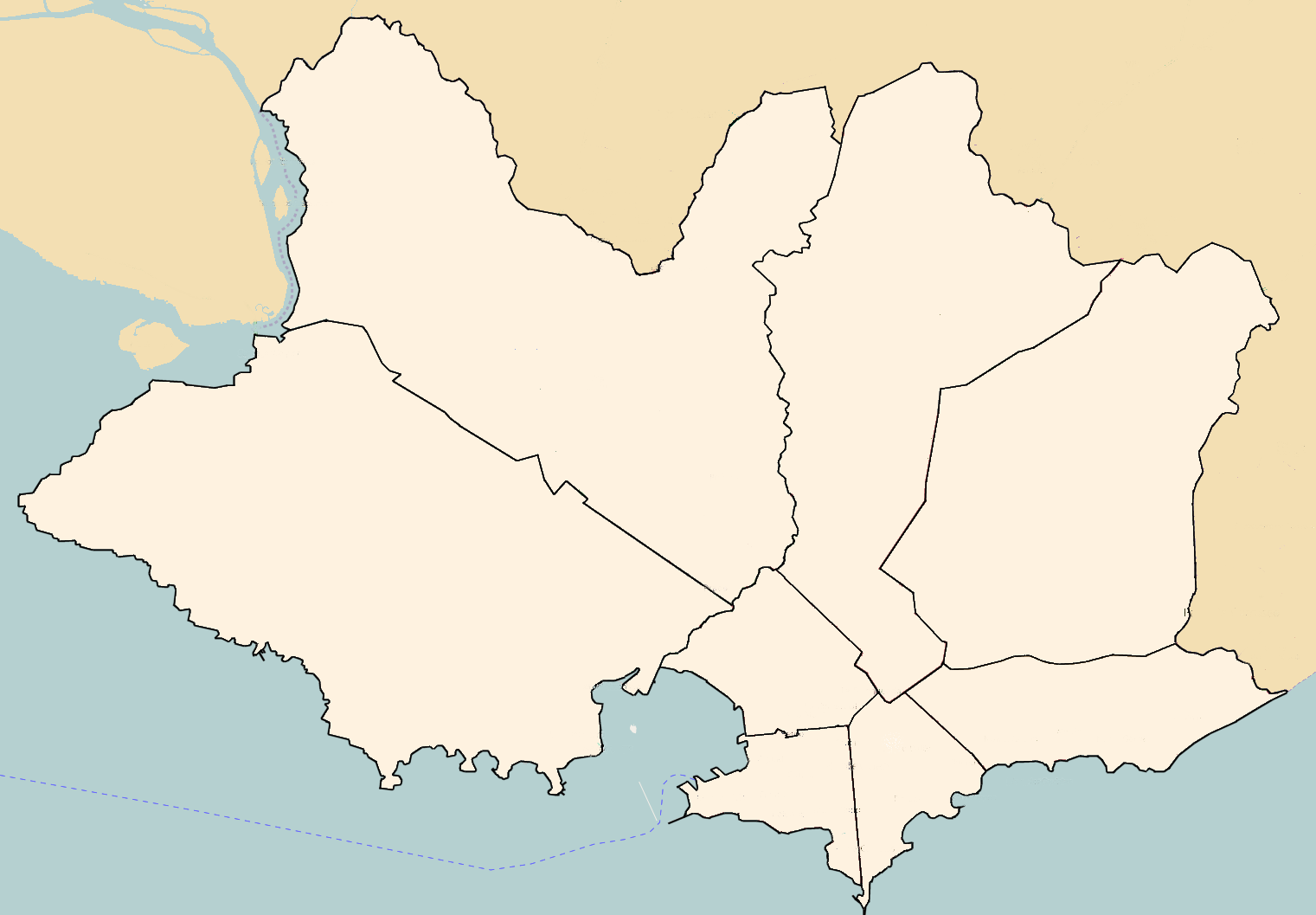
Location of teams from the Montevideo in 2024–25 LUB

Team	Home City	Arena	Capacity
Aguada	Montevideo	Estadio Propio Aguatero	3,738
Biguá	Montevideo	Gimnasio Biguá de Villa Biarritz (Note: Since these venues do not have an official name, they are mentioned as Gimnasio (Stadium) "club name".)	1,200
Cordón	Montevideo	Gimnasio Julio C. Zito Barrella	710
Defensor Sporting	Montevideo	Estadio Óscar Magurno (Note: Defensor's venue was not authorized to host home games, so they played in the Welcome's court.)	800
Ferro Carril	Salto	Polideportivo 1° de Diciembre de 1912	3,000
Hebraica Macabi	Montevideo	Gimnasio Unión Atlética (Note: Hebraica's venue was not authorized to host home games, so they played in the Unión Atlética's court.)	750
Malvín	Montevideo	Gimnasio Juan Francisco Canil	900
Nacional	Montevideo	Polideportivo del Gran Parque Central	800
Peñarol	Montevideo	Estadio Cr. Gastón Güelfi	4,700
Remeros	Mercedes	Gimnasio Agrimensor Mario Eduardo Bellini	400
Trouville	Montevideo	Gimnasio Trouville	780
Urunday Universitario	Montevideo	Gimnasio Urunday Universitario	700
Urupan	Pando	Gimnasio Santiago A. Cigliuti	700
Welcome	Montevideo	Estadio Óscar Magurno	800

=== Personnel and sponsorship ===
Team	Head coach	Captain	Kit manufacturer
Aguada	(Uruguay) Germán Cortizas	(Uruguay) Juan Santiso	Puma
Biguá	(Uruguay) Federico Camiña	(Uruguay) Federico Bavosi	B31
Cordón	(Uruguay) Nicolás Díaz	(Uruguay) Fernando Verrone	MGR
Defensor Sporting	(Uruguay) Gonzalo Brea	(Uruguay) Federico Soto	Kelme
Ferro Carril	(Uruguay) Gastón Ferreira	(Uruguay) Máximo Cerpa	LaDoce
Hebraica y Macabi	(Uruguay) Diego Rivas	(Uruguay) Federico Haller	Concreto
Malvín	(Uruguay) Pablo López	(Uruguay) Lucas Capalbo	Under Armour
Nacional	(Uruguay) Álvaro Ponce	(Uruguay) Patricio Prieto	Umbro
Peñarol	(Argentina) Guillermo Narvarte	(Uruguay) Emiliano Serres	Puma
Remeros	(Uruguay) Ignacio Borges	(Uruguay) Facundo Siniestro	Tauro
Trouville	(Uruguay) Esteban Yaquinta	(Uruguay) Santiago Fernández	Sport House
Urunday Universitario	(Uruguay) Héctor Da Pra	(Uruguay) Nicolás Delgado	Giova
Urupan	(Uruguay) Agustín Esteve	(Uruguay) Abel Agarbado	MGR
Welcome	(Uruguay) Juan Ignacio Vallarino	(Uruguay) Santiago Moglia	Kelme

=== Managerial changes ===
Team	Outgoing manager	Manner of departure	Date of vacancy	Position in table	Replaced with	Date of appointment
Malvín	(Uruguay) Federico Camiña	End of contract	7 June 2024	Pre-season	(Uruguay) Pablo López	26 July 2024
Peñarol	(Uruguay) Marcelo Signorelli	End of contract	25 June 2024	Pre-season	(Uruguay) Leonardo Zylbersztein	4 July 2024
Hebraica y Macabi	(Uruguay) Leonardo Zylbersztein	Signed by Peñarol	4 July 2024	Pre-season	(Uruguay) Diego Rivas	23 July 2024
Welcome	(Uruguay) Diego Rivas	Signed by Hebraica y Macabi	23 July 2024	Pre-season	(Uruguay) Juan Ignacio Vallarino	29 August 2024
Urupan	(Uruguay) Diego Palacios	End of contract	9 August 2024	Pre-season	(Uruguay) Agustín Esteve	13 August 2024
Trouville	(Uruguay) Pablo Morales	Resigned	13 February 2025	11th (4–16)	(Uruguay) Esteban Yaquinta	13 February 2025
Biguá	(Uruguay) Nicolás Mazzarino	Sacked	28 February 2025	8th (8–12)	(Uruguay) Diego Rodríguez (interim)	28 February 2025
Biguá	(Uruguay) Diego Rodríguez (interim)	End of interim period	3 March 2025	8th (9–12)	(Uruguay) Federico Camiña	3 March 2025
Defensor Sporting	(Uruguay) Gonzalo Fernández	Resigned	8 March 2025	5th (11–11)	(Uruguay) Gonzalo Brea	8 March 2025
Peñarol	(Uruguay) Leonardo Zylbersztein	Sacked	14 March 2025	4th (18–6)	(Uruguay) Guzmán Álvarez (interim)	14 March 2025
Peñarol	(Uruguay) Guzmán Álvarez (interim)	End of interim period	17 March 2025	4th (18–7)	(Argentina) Guillermo Narvarte	18 March 2025

== Torneo Clasificatorio ==
The Torneo Clasificatorio (Qualifying Tournament) was the first stage of the LUB. The metropolitan clubs played each other twice, home and away, and the first six of the table played in the Fase Campeonato, where all is guaranteed to participate in the playoffs. The last six played the Reclasificatorio.

=== League table ===
Pos	Team	Pld	W	L	PF	PA	PD	Pts	Qualification
1	Nacional	22	20	2	2076	1723	+353	42	Qualification to Fase Campeonato
2	Aguada (Note: Aguada was deducted 2 points, due to incidents in game 4 of last season's final, against Peñarol.)	22	18	4	1973	1756	+217	38	Qualification to Fase Campeonato
3	Malvín	22	14	8	1775	1684	+91	36	Qualification to Fase Campeonato
4	Peñarol (Note: Peñarol was deducted 2 points, due to incidents in game 4 of last season's final, against Aguada. In addition, 2 more points were deducted, due to incidents in the matchday 14, in the Clásico against Nacional.)	22	17	5	1862	1623	+239	35	Qualification to Fase Campeonato
5	Defensor Sporting	22	11	11	1928	1820	+108	33	Qualification to Fase Campeonato
6	Cordón	22	10	12	1829	1883	−54	32	Qualification to Fase Campeonato
7	Biguá	22	9	13	1866	1900	−34	31 (Note: Biguá 2–0 Hebraica y Macabi)	Qualficiation to Reclasificatorio
8	Hebraica y Macabi	22	9	13	1869	1935	−66	31	Qualficiation to Reclasificatorio
9	Urunday Universitario	22	8	14	1759	1888	−129	30	Qualficiation to Reclasificatorio
10	Urupan	22	7	15	1784	1932	−148	29	Qualficiation to Reclasificatorio
11	Welcome	22	5	17	1698	2070	−372	27	Qualficiation to Reclasificatorio
12	Trouville	22	4	18	1625	1830	−205	26	Qualficiation to Reclasificatorio

Source: FUBB
Rules for classification: 1) Win–loss record; 2) Head–to–head record; 3) Head–to–head point difference; 4) Point difference; 5) Points scored; 6) Sum of quotients of points scored

=== Results ===
Home \ Away	AGU	BIG	COR	DSC	HYM	MAL	NAC	PEÑ	TRO	UUN	UPA	WEL
Aguada	—	88–67	111–97	96–84	95–86	71–70	88–90	77–69	83–65	98–86	91–78	101–72
Biguá	81–95	—	97–104	79–81	113–85	73–86	96–102	72–83	92–87	85–92	75–73	99–69
Cordón	96–88	82–80	—	71–87	77–97	69–76	79–86	92–104	74–69	93–85	87–65	95–75
Defensor Sporting	85–89	100–79	82–65	—	86–90	87–80	78–88	84–85	90–59	98–90	91–66	112–77
Hebraica y Macabi	83–102	87–95	94–98	84–82	—	84–90	82–92	65–93	85–77	74–66	65–73	83–88
Malvín	67–81	75–82	82–60	86–73	92–83	—	67–88	75–73	85–71	97–89	91–72	97–70
Nacional	91–94	97–82	98–83	96–81	101–88	84–67	—	80–78	77–81	99–79	89–75	115–64
Peñarol	86–77	76–73	77–73	70–64	82–68	79–70	85–89	—	93–75	94–67	71–78	88–59
Trouville	75–77	82–87	78–74	84–93	79–88	68–73	70–86	56–97	—	68–71	62–88	83–77
Urunday Universitario	81–71	85–79	77–87	81–78	77–89	93–87	72–90	80–83	72–80	—	61–90	86–97
Urupan	73–96	89–93	91–92	94–92	95–104	74–76	65–121	83–105	97–90	85–95	—	92–86
Welcome	74–104	82–87	84–81	111–120	82–105	60–86	69–117	66–91	71–66	66–74	99–88	—

Source: FUBB
Legend: Blue = home team win; Red = away team win.

== Fase Campeonato ==
The Fase Campeonato (Championship Phase) is a stage played to organize the first six teams in the Torneo Clasificatorio, in the play-offs. The clubs play each other once. The teams accumulated their points to that obtained in the first stage.

=== Table ===
Pos	Team	Pld	W	L	PF	PA	PD	Pts	Qualification
1	Nacional (C, O)	27	23	4	2495	2128	+367	50	Qualification to Play-offs
2	Aguada (Note: Aguada was deducted 2 points, due to incidents in game 4 of last season's final, against Peñarol.)	27	22	5	2434	2174	+260	47	Qualification to Play-offs
3	Malvín	27	17	10	2169	2070	+99	44	Qualification to Play-offs
4	Peñarol (Note: Peñarol was deducted 2 points, due to incidents in game 4 of last season's final, against Aguada. In addition, 2 more points were deducted, due to incidents in the matchday 14, in the Clásico against Nacional.)	27	20	7	2269	2033	+236	43	Qualification to Play-offs
5	Defensor Sporting	27	12	15	2289	2213	+76	39	Qualification to Play-offs
6	Cordón	27	11	16	2251	2335	−84	38	Qualification to Play-offs

Source: FUBB
Rules for classification: 1) Win–loss record; 2) Head–to–head record; 3) Head–to–head point difference; 4) Point difference; 5) Points scored; 6) Sum of quotients of points scored
(C) Champions; (O) Play-off winners

=== Home teams ===
The aggregate score of the Torneo Clasificatorio, will determine the home teams in this phase.

Against	AGU	COR	DSC	MAL	NAC	PEÑ
Aguada	—N/a	Yes; 207–185	Yes; 185–169	Yes; 152–137	Yes; 182–181	No; 154–155
Cordón	No; 185–207	—N/a	No; 136–169	No; 129–158	No; 162–184	No; 165–181
Defensor Sporting	No; 169–185	Yes; 169–136	—N/a	No; 160–166	No; 159–184	No; 148–155
Malvín	No; 137–152	Yes; 158–129	Yes; 166–160	—N/a	No; 134–172	No; 145–152
Nacional	No; 181–182	Yes; 184–162	Yes; 184–159	Yes; 172–134	—N/a	Yes; 169–165
Peñarol	Yes; 155–154	Yes; 181–165	Yes; 155–148	Yes; 152–145	No; 165–169	—N/a

=== Results ===
Home \ Away	AGU	COR	DSC	MAL	NAC	PEÑ
Aguada		109–94	83–75	85–90	99–81	
Cordón						
Defensor Sporting		88–78				
Malvín		75–82	71–55			
Nacional		85–80	81–69	82–85		90–72
Peñarol	78–85	95–88	80–73	82–73		

Source: FUBB
Legend: Blue = home team win; Red = away team win.

== Reclasificatorio ==
The Reclasificatorio (Requalifier) is a stage played by the last six teams in the Torneo Clasificatorio. The clubs played each other once. The teams accumulated their points to that obtained in the first stage. This stage defined the teams qualified for the play-in and the relegated teams.

=== Table ===
Pos	Team	Pld	W	L	PF	PA	PD	Pts	Qualification or relegation
7	Biguá	27	12	15	2326	2313	+13	39 (Note: Biguá 3–0 Hebraica y Macabi)	Qualification to Play-in
8	Hebraica y Macabi	27	12	15	2307	2361	−54	39	Qualification to Play-in
9	Urunday Universitario	27	11	16	2103	2219	−116	38	
10	Welcome (O)	27	8	19	2157	2529	−372	35 (Note: Being tied on points, the last relegation is decided in a playoff match)	Relegation play-off
11	Urupan (Note: Urupan was deducted 2 points, due to incidents in matchday 5 of the Reclasificatorio, against Hebraica y Macabi.) (R)	27	10	17	2214	2362	−148	35	Relegation play-off
12	Trouville (R)	26	4	22	1953	2230	−277	30	Relegation to Liga de Ascenso

Source: FUBB
Rules for classification: 1) Win–loss record; 2) Head–to–head record; 3) Head–to–head point difference; 4) Point difference; 5) Points scored; 6) Sum of quotients of points scored
(O) Play-off winners; (R) Relegated

=== Home teams ===
The aggregate score of the Torneo Clasificatorio, will determine the home teams in this phase.

Against	BIG	HYM	TRO	UUN	UPA	WEL
Biguá	—N/a	Yes; 208–172	Yes; 179–169	No; 170–171	Yes; 168–162	Yes; 186–151
Hebraica y Macabi	No; 172–208	—N/a	Yes; 173–156	Yes; 163–143	Yes; 169–168	Yes; 188–170
Trouville	No; 169–179	No; 156–173	—N/a	Yes; 148–143	No; 152–185	Yes; 149–148
Urunday Universitario	Yes; 171–170	No; 163–143	No; 143–148	—N/a	No; 156–174	No; 160–163
Urupan	No; 162–168	No; 168–169	Yes; 185–152	Yes; 175–156	—N/a	No; 180–185
Welcome	No; 151–186	No; 170–188	No; 148–149	Yes; 163–160	Yes; 185–180	—N/a

=== Results ===
Home \ Away	BIG	HYM	TRO	UUN	UPA	WEL
Biguá		82–77	91–80		86–88	124–90
Hebraica y Macabi			98–88	74–78	102–97	87–81
Trouville				0–20 (Note: Trouville lost by forfeit)		81–106
Urunday Universitario	78–77					
Urupan			85–79	83–78		
Welcome				97–90	85–77	

Source: FUBB
Legend: Blue = home team win; Red = away team win.

== OBL ==
The OBL (Organización de Básquetbol del Litoral; English: Coastal Basketball Organization) is a tournament in which the best teams from Salto, Paysandú and the Soriano Regional League participate. The two finalists qualify for the LUB play-in.

=== Torneo Litoral Norte ===
This stage pits the champions and runners-up of the Salto and Paysandú tournaments against each other.

The finalists and the winner of the third-place match qualified for the OBL.

==== Qualified teams ====
Team	Method of qualification
Ferro Carril	Liga Salteña de Básquetbol champions
Pelotaris	Liga de Básquetbol de Paysandú champions
Touring	Liga de Básquetbol de Paysandú runners-up
Universitario	Liga Salteña de Básquetbol runners-up

==== Bracket ====
The semi-finals are played in a best-of-three format, home and away, with the advantage going to the league champions. The winners played a title game and the losers also played a match, for qualification to the OBL Tournament. Both matches were played in the Estadio 8 de Junio, Paysandú.

Semi-finals	Final
1S	Ferro Carril	71	100	2
2P	Touring	67	95	0
1S	Ferro Carril	85
1P	Pelotaris	67
1P	Pelotaris	66	91	2
2S	Universitario	59	69	0	Third place match
2P	Touring	81
2S	Universitario	54

Source: FUBB

=== OBL Tournament ===
In this tournament, the teams qualified by the Liga Regional de Soriano played against those from the Torneo Litoral Norte.

These teams will carryed over the results obtained in their qualifying tournaments, as follows:

- Remeros is awarded a 20–0 victory over Pacaembú Biguá, for beating them 3–1 in the Liga Regional de Soriano finals.
- Ferro Carril is awarded a 20–0 victory over Touring, for beating them 2–0 in the Torneo Litoral Norte semifinals.
- Pelotaris is awarded a 20–0 victory over Touring, for beating them 3–0 in the Liga de Básquetbol de Paysandú finals.
- Ferro Carril is awarded a 20–0 victory over Pelotaris, for beating them 85–67 in the Torneo Litoral Norte final.

==== Qualified teams ====
Team	Method of qualification
Ferro Carril	Torneo Litoral Norte champions
Pacaembú Biguá	Liga Regional de Básquetbol de Soriano runners-up
Pelotaris	Torneo Litoral Norte runners-up
Remeros	Liga Regional de Básquetbol de Soriano champions
Touring	Torneo Litoral Norte third place

==== Table ====
Pos	Team	Pld	W	L	PF	PA	PD	Pts	Qualification or relegation
1	Ferro Carril (C, O)	3	3	0	130	85	+45	6	Qualification to Final Four
2	Remeros	3	2	1	202	183	+19	5	Qualification to Final Four
3	Pelotaris	3	2	1	86	82	+4	5	Qualification to Final Four
4	Touring	4	1	3	113	137	−24	5	Qualification to Final Four
5	Pacaembú Biguá	3	0	3	62	106	−44	3	

Source: FUBB
Rules for classification: 1) Win–loss record; 2) Head–to–head record; 3) Head–to–head point difference; 4) Point difference; 5) Points scored; 6) Sum of quotients of points scored
(C) Champions; (O) Play-off winners

==== Results ====
Home \ Away	FCS	PAC	PEL	REM	TOU
Ferro Carril				90–85	
Pacaembú Biguá	(Note: The matches were postponed due to the cancellation of the Pacaembú Biguá-Touring match. Due to scheduling issues and with the semifinals already set, the matches were canceled.)				0–20 (Note: Pacaembú Biguá had originally won the match 79–69. Touring claimed the points because four youth players were not registered on the match form. The Court awarded them the match win by 20–0.)
Pelotaris		66–62			
Remeros					97–93
Touring					

Source: FUBB
Legend: Blue = home team win; Red = away team win.

==== Final Four ====
The final four will be held in the Estadio 8 de Junio, Paysandú.

Semi-finals
1	Ferro Carril	72
4	Touring	62
2	Remeros	67
3	Pelotaris	65

Final
1	Ferro Carril	88
2	Remeros	69

Source: FUBB

== Relegation play-off ==
6 April 2025
20:15 UTC−3

Report

Welcome	88–87	Urupan
Scoring by quarter: 24–20, 17–23, 24–22, 22–23
Pts: Peña 34; Rebs: Peña 12; Asts: Barrera 7		Pts: Peacock 20; Rebs: Peacock 18; Asts: Peacock 4

Estadio Romeo Schinca, Montevideo
Referees: Alejandro Sánchez Varela, Julio Dutra, Washington Chamorro

== Play-in and Play-offs ==
Play-in
8	Hebraica y Macabi	70	82	87	2
2O	Remeros	93	77	76	1
7	Biguá	103	88	2
1O	Ferro Carril	77	70	0

Quarter-finals
1	Nacional	94	115	96	3
8	Hebraica y Macabi	52	64	72	0
4	Peñarol	76	78	76	93	78	2
5	Defensor Sporting	71	73	95	96	84	3
2	Aguada	89	95	99	3
7	Biguá	77	90	82	0
3	Malvín	81	78	90	75	105	3
6	Cordón	88	63	75	79	76	2

Semi-finals
1	Nacional	97	77	90	85	3
5	Defensor Sporting	61	87	82	80	1
2	Aguada	96	83	93	83	111	3
3	Malvín	99	87	80	76	99	2

Finals
1	Nacional	102	75	73	72	103	97	79	4
2	Aguada	77	84	82	80	98	96	77	3

Source: FUBB

=== Finals ===
16 May 2025	Nacional	102–77 (Series: 1–0)	Aguada	Antel Arena, Montevideo
21:15 UTC−3	Scoring by quarter: 23–25, 26–13, 23–23, 30–16
	Pts: Semiglia 22; Rebs: Mãozinha 13; Asts: Three players 3	Boxscore	Pts: Sims 19; Rebs: Hassell 14; Asts: Santiso 7	Referees: Alejandro Sánchez Varela, Gonzalo Salgueiro, Vivian García

19 May 2025	Aguada	84–75 (Series: 1–1)	Nacional	Antel Arena, Montevideo
21:15 UTC−3	Scoring by quarter: 23–22, 21–12, 16–15, 24–26
	Pts: Sims 22; Rebs: Hassell, Wilson 10; Asts: Vidal 6	Boxscore	Pts: Semiglia 16; Rebs: Mãozinha 13; Asts: Three players 2	Attendance: 4,800; Referees: Andrés Laulhe, Diego Ortiz, Gastón Rodríguez

22 May 2025	Nacional	73–82 (Series: 1–2)	Aguada	Antel Arena, Montevideo
21:15 UTC−3	Scoring by quarter: 14–20, 25–25, 18–17, 16–20
	Pts: Smith 18; Rebs: Espíndola 9 Asts: Smith 4	Boxscore	Pts: Wilson 18; Rebs: Sims 9 Asts: Wilson 5	Referees: Andrés Bartel, Julio Dutra, Carlos Romero

25 May 2025	Aguada	80–72 (Series: 3–1)	Nacional	Antel Arena, Montevideo
21:15 UTC−3	Scoring by quarter: 13–22, 22–22, 21–18, 24–10
	Pts: Sims 23; Rebs: Hassell 12; Asts: Santiso, Sims 4	Boxscore	Pts: Oglivie 18; Rebs: Mãozinha 10; Asts: Smith 5	Referees: Alejandro Sánchez Varela, Andrés Laulhe, Gonzalo Salgueiro

27 May 2025	Nacional	103–98 (Series: 2–3)	Aguada	Antel Arena, Montevideo
21:15 UTC−3	Scoring by quarter: 33–21, 21–26, 24–20, 25–31
	Pts: Semiglia 19; Rebs: Oglivie, Espíndola 7 Asts: Espíndola 7	Boxscore	Pts: Sims 29; Rebs: Hassell 8 Asts: Vidal 7	Referees: Andrés Bartel, Alejandro Sánchez Varela, Julio Dutra

30 May 2025	Aguada	96–97 (Series: 3–3)	Nacional	Antel Arena, Montevideo
21:15 UTC−3	Scoring by quarter: 36–35, 24–18, 27–18, 9–26
	Pts: Sims 24; Rebs: Hassell 13; Asts: Vidal 9	Boxscore	Pts: Smith 30; Rebs: Espíndola 7 Asts: Smith 8	Referees: Andrés Bartel, Andrés Laulhe, Diego Ortiz

1 June 2025	Nacional	79–77 (Series: 4–3)	Aguada	Antel Arena, Montevideo
21:15 UTC−3	Scoring by quarter: 18–17, 22–16, 15–20, 24–24
	Pts: Smith 20; Rebs: Mãozinha 12; Asts: Six players 2	Boxscore	Pts: Wilson 28; Rebs: Wilson 11; Asts: Three players 2	Referees: Andrés Bartel, Alejandro Sánchez Varela, Gonzalo Salgueiro

== Final standings ==
Pos	Team	Pld	W	L	Seed	Qualification or relegation
Champion
1	Nacional	41	33	8	1	Qualification to Basketball Champions League Americas
Runners-up
2	Aguada	42	31	11	2	Qualification to Basketball Champions League Americas
Eliminated at semi-finals
3	Malvín (Note: Although Malvín qualified for the Liga Sudamericana de Baloncesto, refused to participate in the tournament.)	37	22	15	3	
4	Defensor Sporting	36	16	20	5	Qualification to Liga Sudamericana de Baloncesto
Eliminated at quarter-finals
5	Peñarol	32	22	10	4	
6	Cordón	32	13	19	6	
7	Biguá	32	14	18	7	
8	Hebraica y Macabi	33	14	19	8	
Eliminated at play-in
9	Ferro Carril	2	0	2	1 OBL	
10	Remeros	3	1	2	2 OBL	
Eliminated at Reclasificatorio
11	Urunday Universitario	27	11	16	9	
Relegation play-off winner
12	Welcome	28	9	19	10	
Relegated
13	Urupan	28	10	18	11	Relegation to Liga de Ascenso
14	Trouville	26	4	22	12	Relegation to Liga de Ascenso

== Statistical leaders ==
=== Points ===
Pos	Player	Club	PPG
1	(Colombia) Álvaro Peña	Welcome/Remeros	28.5
2	(Armenia) Andre Spight	Biguá	23.7
3	(United States) Donald Sims	Aguada	22.0
4	(United States) Connor Zinaich	Nacional	21.6
5	(Argentina) Erik Thomas	Urunday U.	21.5

=== Rebounds ===
Pos	Player	Club	RPG
1	(United States) Cobie Barnes	Ferro Carril	12.0
2	(United States) Anthony Peacock	Urupan	10.6
3	(United States) Frank Hassell	Aguada	10.5
4	(United States Virgin Islands) Ivan Aska	Urunday U.	10.1
5	(Uruguay) Kiril Wachsmann	Malvín	10.1

=== Assists ===
Pos	Player	Club	APG
1	(Uruguay) Santiago Vidal	Aguada	7.7
2	(Uruguay) Santiago Wohlwend	Hebraica y Macabi	6.0
3	(Uruguay) Luciano Parodi	Peñarol	5.6
4	(Uruguay) Matías De Gouveia	Hebraica y Macabi	5.6
5	(United States) Malik Curry	Defensor Sporting	5.5

=== Blocks ===
Pos	Player	Club	BPG
1	(United States) Connor Zinaich	Nacional	1.9
2	(Chile) Manny Suárez	Nacional	1.7
3	(Uruguay) Rogelio De León	Ferro Carril	1.5
4	(Brazil) Mãozinha	Nacional	1.4
5	(United States) Gerard DeVaughn	Urunday U.	1.4

Source: FUBB

== Awards ==
All official awards of the 2024–25 LUB season.

=== Season MVP ===
Pos.	Player	Team
SG	(Uruguay) Patricio Prieto	Nacional

=== Coach of the season ===
Coach	Team
(Uruguay) Álvaro Ponce	Nacional

=== Finals MVP ===
Pos.	Player	Team
SG	(Uruguay) Patricio Prieto	Nacional

=== National regular season MVP ===
Pos.	Player	Team
PG	(Uruguay) Lucas Capalbo	Malvín

=== Foreign season MVP ===
Pos.	Player	Team
SG	(Dominican Republic) James Feldeine	Nacional

=== Defensive Player of the regular season Award ===
Pos.	Player	Team
SF	(Uruguay) Federico Pereiras	Aguada

=== Rookie Player of the regular season Award ===
Pos.	Player	Team
PF	(Uruguay) Nicolás Martínez	Malvín

=== Baccio man of the season ===
Pos.	Player	Team
Head coach	(Uruguay) Álvaro Ponce	Nacional

=== All-Tournament Team ===
Player	Team
(Uruguay) Lucas Capalbo	Malvín
(United States) Donald Sims	Aguada
(Dominican Republic) James Feldeine	Nacional
(United States) Jamil Wilson	Aguada
(Panama) Ernesto Oglivie	Nacional

=== BROU player of the week ===
Week	Pos.	Player	Team
1	C	(United States) Anthony Peacock	Urupan
2	PG	(Uruguay) Luciano Parodi	Peñarol
3	PF	(Chile) Manny Suárez	Nacional
4	C	(United States) Frank Hassell	Aguada
5	SF	(Uruguay) Gastón Semiglia	Nacional
6	SG	(Dominican Republic) James Feldeine	Nacional
7	SG	(Armenia) Andre Spight	Biguá
8	SG	(United States) Brandon Robinson	Peñarol
9	C	(United States) Frank Hassell	Aguada
10	C	(United States) Connor Zinaich	Nacional
11	SG	(Argentina) Mateo Bolívar	Trouville
12	C	(Dominican Republic) Luis Santos	Peñarol
13	SF	(United States) Dion Wright	Defensor Sporting
14	PF	(United States) Jamil Wilson	Aguada
15	PF	(Serbia) Dragan Zeković	Malvín
16	SG	(Uruguay) Tiago Leites	Urupan
17	SG	(United States) Donald Sims	Aguada
18	SG	(Armenia) Andre Spight	Biguá
19	SF	(Uruguay) Ignacio Xavier	Peñarol
20	C	(Colombia) Álvaro Peña	Welcome
21	PG	(Uruguay) Lucas Capalbo	Malvín
22	C	(Cape Verde) Victor Andrade	Cordón
23	SG	(United States) Dexter McClanahan	Defensor Sporting
24	PG	(Uruguay) Lucas Capalbo	Malvín
25	PG	(Uruguay) Santiago Vidal	Aguada
26	SF	(Uruguay) Gastón Semiglia	Nacional
27	PG	(Uruguay) Santiago Vidal	Aguada

== LUB clubs in international competitions ==
Basketball Champions League Americas
Team	Progress	Result	W–L
Biguá	Group C	3rd of 3 teams (1–5)	1–5

Liga Sudamericana de Baloncesto
Team	Progress	Result	W–L
Nacional	Final	Win vs. (Argentine Basketball Confederation) San Lorenzo	6–0
Nacional	Semi-finals	Win vs. (Uruguayan Basketball Federation) Defensor Sporting	6–0
Nacional	Group A	1st of 5 teams (4–0)	6–0
Defensor Sporting	Third place game	Loss vs. (Argentine Basketball Confederation) Olímpico	3–3
Defensor Sporting	Semi-finals	Loss vs. (Uruguayan Basketball Federation) Nacional	3–3
Defensor Sporting	Group B	2nd of 5 teams (3–1)	3–3

== See also ==
- 2024–25 in Uruguayan basketball
