= 2024 DTA season =

Uruguayan professional basketball season

DTA
- Season: 2024
- Dates: 8 June 2024 – 23 September 2024
- Games played: 121
- Teams: 11

Regular season
- Top seed: Marne
- Promoted: Marne; Atenas; Yale

Finals
- Champions: Atenas; 2nd title
- Runners-up: Marne
- Semifinalists: Yale; Albatros
- Finals MVP: (Uruguay) Camilo Colman

Statistical leaders
Points	(Uruguay) Fabrizio Viacava	19.7
Rebounds	(Brazil) Pedro Peçanha	13.3
Assists	(Uruguay) Matías De Gouveia	6.6

Records
- Biggest home win: Marne 100–54 Ateneo (26 June 2024)
- Biggest away win: Danubio 55–95 Marne (23 June 2024)
- Highest scoring: Albatros 98–104 Marne (16 June 2024)
- Winning streak: 12 games Marne
- Losing streak: 9 games Danubio

The 2024 DTA season, is the 21st season of the third most important Uruguayan basketball league, since its establishment in 2003. It started on 8 June 2024 with the regular season and ended on 23 September 2024 with the second game of the third promotion playoff.

The champion was Atenas, who defeated Marne in the final and returned to Liga de Ascenso after having been relegated by abandonment.

Atenas was the first team to be promoted, beating Yale 2-0 in the semi-finals. Minutes later, Marne also gained promotion, defeating Albatros 2-0.

The two losers played a playoff for the third promotion, where Yale beat Albatros 2-0.

== Teams ==
=== Promotion, relegation and abandonments (pre-season) ===
A total of 11 teams contested the league, including 10 sides from the 2023 season and one relegated from the 2023 El Metro.

Miramar, which was relegated last year from the El Metro, decided not to participate this season. Also, Layva and Deportivo Paysandú, who received sanctions for incidents last tournament, forfeited this tournament either.

Teams relegated from El Metro

- Atenas
- Miramar

Teams promoted to Liga de Ascenso

- Montevideo
- Bohemios

=== Venues and locations ===
Location of teams in 2024 DTA
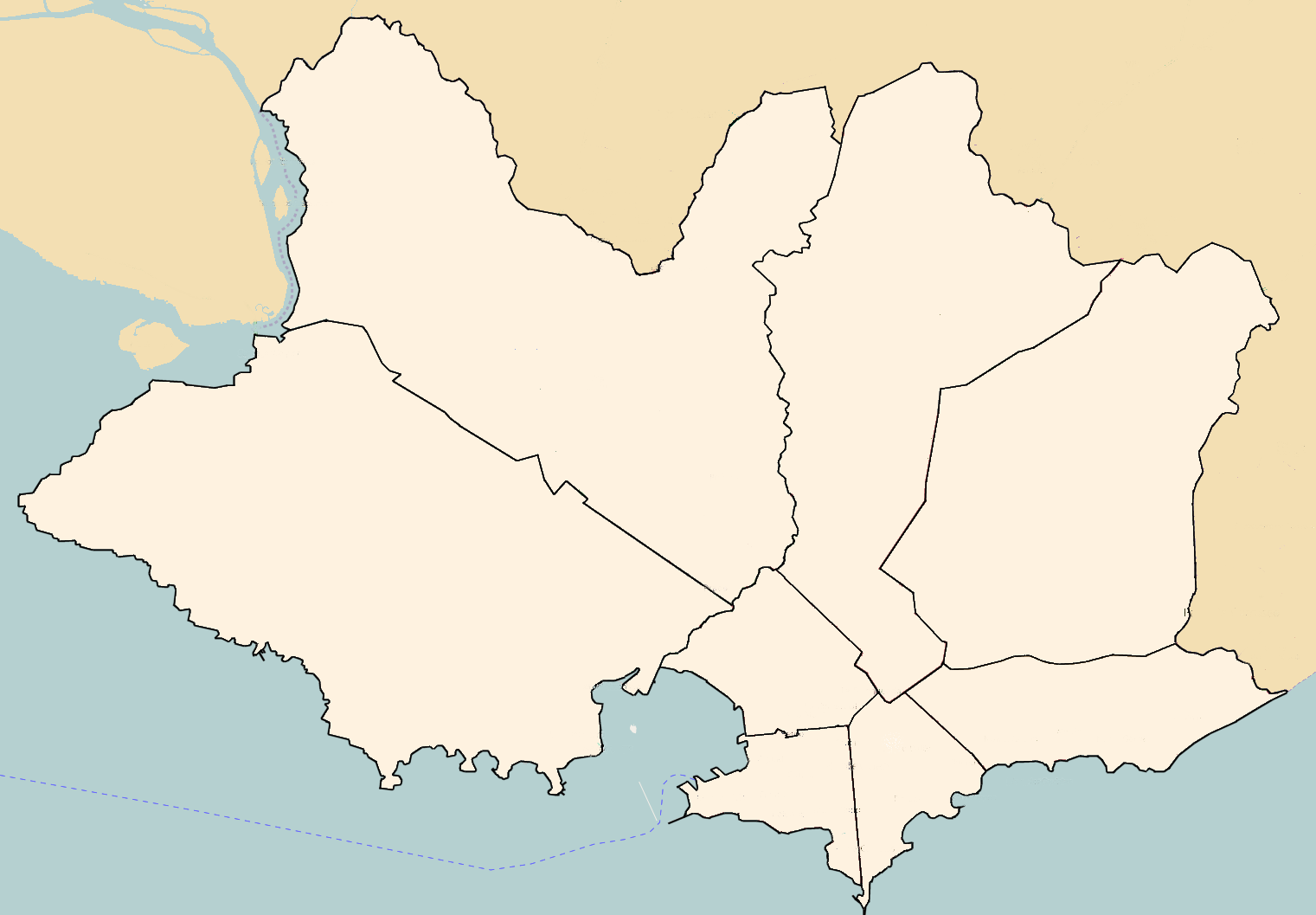
Location of teams from the Montevideo in 2024 DTA

Club	City	Arena	Capacity
Albatros	Montevideo	Gimnasio Albatros (Note: Since these venues do not have an official name, they are mentioned as Gimnasio (Arena) "club name".)	125
Atenas	Montevideo	Estadio Antonio María Borderes	1,565
Ateneo	Piriápolis	Gimnasio Alfredo L. Núñez	750
Auriblanco	Montevideo	Gimnasio Roberto Vázquez	350
Capurro	Montevideo	Gimnasio Guillermo J. Ríos	150
Danubio	Montevideo	Gimnasio Defensores de Maroñas (Note: Danubio does not have an Arena, it plays its games on the Defensores de Maroñas court)	350
Defensores de Maroñas	Montevideo	Gimnasio Defensores de Maroñas	400
Juventud	Las Piedras	Estadio Federal Cirilio Malnatti	1,000
Marne	Montevideo	Gimnasio Trouville (Note: Marne has its Arena under renovation an plays its games on the Trouville court)	780
San Telmo Rápido Sport	Montevideo	Gimnasio Lussich Rolando	500
Yale	Montevideo	Campo de Deportes Luis Ruocco	500

=== Personnel and sponsorship ===
Team	Head coach	Captain	Kit manufacturer
Albatros	(Uruguay) Nicolás Ellis	(Uruguay) Fabrizio Viacava	Sporty's
Atenas	(Uruguay) Guido Fernández	(Uruguay) Camilo Colman	Kelme
Ateneo	(Uruguay) Fernando Cabral	(Uruguay) Fernando Cestaro	Maxpe Sport
Auriblanco	(Uruguay) Mauricio Biderman	(Uruguay) Facundo Yaquinta	Sporty's
Capurro	(Uruguay) Fernando Cabrera	(Uruguay) Andrés Rodríguez	MGR
Danubio	(Uruguay) Matías Bueno	(Uruguay) Federico Álvarez	Starbade
Defensores de Maroñas	(Uruguay) Pedro Xavier	(Uruguay) Daniel Dacal	MGR
Juventud	(Uruguay) Humberto Sánchez	(Uruguay) Sergio Castello	Elite
Marne	(Uruguay) Fabián Narbais	(Uruguay) Matías Nicoletti	Sporty's
San Telmo Rápido Sport	(Uruguay) Javier Masner	(Uruguay) Javier Crocano	Concreto
Yale	(Uruguay) Ignacio Ortiz	(Uruguay) Emilio Taboada	Sports Dreams

=== Managerial changes ===
Team	Outgoing manager	Manner of departure	Date of vacancy	Position in table	Replaced with	Date of appointment
Yale	(Uruguay) Javier Masner	Pre-season	End of contract	31 December 2023	(Uruguay) Ignacio Ortiz	21 April 2024
Auriblanco	(Uruguay) Andrés Jones	Pre-season	End of contract	31 December 2023	(Uruguay) Mauricio Biderman	8 June 2024
San Telmo Rápido Sport	(Uruguay) Nicolás Scarabino	Pre-season	Signed by Tabaré	8 January 2024	(Uruguay) Javier Masner	18 May 2024
Atenas	(Uruguay) Mauricio Rodríguez	Pre-season	Signed by Bohemios	23 January 2024	(Uruguay) Guido Fernández	28 March 2024
Capurro	(Uruguay) Ignacio Ortega	Pre-season	End of contract	31 January 2024	(Uruguay) Fernando Cabrera	25 May 2024
Defensores de Maroñas	(Uruguay) Sebastián Baranzano	Pre-season	Resigned	8 April 2024	(Uruguay) Pedro Xavier	8 April 2024
Ateneo	(Uruguay) Juan Carlos Werstein	Pre-season	Resigned	25 April 2024	(Uruguay) Fernando Cabral	25 April 2024
Auriblanco	(Uruguay) Mauricio Biderman	10th (1–9)	Resigned	15 July 2024	(Uruguay) Ernesto Dorrego	16 July 2024
Juventud	(Uruguay) Andrés Antúnez	7th (4–8)	Resigned	24 July 2024	(Uruguay) Humberto Sánchez	24 July 2024
San Telmo Rápido Sport	(Uruguay) Javier Masner	7th (6–12)	Resigned	12 August 2024	(Uruguay) Juan Álvarez	12 August 2024

== Regular season ==
The Regular season was the first stage of the DTA. The clubs played each other twice, home and away. The first eight of the table will play the play-offs, and the last five will be eliminated.

=== League table ===
Pos	Team	Pld	W	L	PF	PA	PD	Pts	Qualification
1	Marne	20	18	2	1753	1415	+338	38	Qualification to Play-offs
2	Atenas (Note: Atenas was deducted 1 point, for incidents in Matchday 8, against Marne)	20	18	2	1683	1329	+354	37	Qualification to Play-offs
3	Yale	20	15	5	1627	1513	+114	35	Qualification to Play-offs
4	Albatros	20	12	8	1584	1522	+62	32	Qualification to Play-offs
5	Defensores de Maroñas	20	9	11	1438	1497	−59	29	Qualification to Play-offs
6	San Telmo Rápido Sport	20	8	12	1441	1511	−70	28	Qualification to Play-offs
7	Auriblanco	20	7	13	1454	1531	−77	27 (Note: Auriblanco 146–144 Capurro)	Qualification to Play-offs
8	Capurro (Note: Capurro were deducted 3 points, due to incidents in game 3 of last season's quarter-finals game, against Deportivo Paysandú)	20	10	10	1552	1539	+13	27	Qualification to Play-offs
9	Juventud	20	6	14	1480	1634	−154	26	
10	Danubio	20	3	17	1366	1649	−283	23	
11	Ateneo (Note: Ateneo were deducted 3 points, due to incidents in game 3 of last season's quarter-finals game, against Bohemios)	20	4	16	1461	1699	−238	21	

Source: FUBB
Rules for classification: 1) Win–loss record; 2) Head–to–head record; 3) Head–to–head point difference; 4) Point difference; 5) Points scored; 6) Sum of quotients of points scored

=== Results ===
Home \ Away	ALB	ATE	API	AUR	CPR	DAN	DMA	JLP	MNE	STR	YAL
Albatros	—	66–84	71–57	72–69	79–72	94–68	60–70	100–90	98–104	88–97	58–53
Atenas	73–51	—	94–64	71–58	83–65	87–51	81–55	106–65	71–79	97–78	77–59
Ateneo	71–87	83–95	—	84–81	60–85	101–81	82–64	91–81	60–96	68–79	77–85
Auriblanco	70–86	57–81	81–58	—	73–80	74–61	66–62	106–89	80–88	70–76	80–105
Capurro	85–81	84–92	107–80	64–73	—	92–68	100–79	80–79	62–92	87–72	58–59
Danubio	66–89	73–86	77–73	63–72	79–90	—	71–68	63–64	55–95	77–86	75–104
Defensores de Maroñas	79–74	67–84	81–73	79–61	71–69	75–63	—	84–69	83–91	63–66	73–95
Juventud	94–99	58–89	87–68	76–71	84–58	61–65	80–67	—	62–86	68–63	72–81
Marne	67–69	98–89	100–54	97–68	89–64	80–72	71–56	92–55	—	82–75	82–81
San Telmo Rápido Sport	66–86	58–67	81–76	66–75	68–73	74–60	56–67	70–67	68–76	—	74–82
Yale	87–76	60–76	86–81	73–69	78–77	84–78	85–95	95–79	93–88	82–68	—

Source: FUBB
Legend: Blue = home team win; Red = away team win.

== Play-offs ==
The two finalists of this stage will promote, and play a single-match final to crown the champion. The losers play a best-of-three serie for the third promotion.

Quarter-finals
1	Marne	88	82	2
8	Capurro	79	67	0
4	Albatros	91	82	2
5	Defensores de Maroñas	86	75	0
2	Atenas	81	68	71	2
7	Auriblanco	59	73	62	1
3	Yale	75	65	2
6	San Telmo Rápido Sport	59	61	0

Semi-finals
1	Marne	73	68	2
4	Albatros	62	66	0
2	Atenas	79	85	2
3	Yale	63	60	0

Final
1	Marne	81
2	Atenas	90
Promotion play-off
4	Albatros	67	69	0
3	Yale	71	76	2

Source: FUBB

== Final standings ==
Pos	Team	Pld	W	L	Seed	Promotion or relegation
Champion
1	Atenas	26	23	3	2	Promotion to Liga de Ascenso
Runners-up
2	Marne	25	22	3	1	Promotion to Liga de Ascenso
Promotion play-off winner
3	Yale	26	19	7	3	Promotion to Liga de Ascenso
Promotion play-off loser
4	Albatros	26	14	12	4	
Eliminated in quarter-finals
5	Defensores de Maroñas	22	9	13	5	
6	San Telmo Rápido Sport	22	8	14	6	
7	Auriblanco	23	8	15	7	
8	Capurro	22	10	12	8	
Eliminated at regular season
9	Juventud	20	6	14	9	
10	Danubio	20	3	17	10	
11	Ateneo	20	4	16	11	

== Statistical leaders ==
=== Points ===
Pos	Player	Club	PPG
1	(Uruguay) Fabrizio Viacava	Albatros	19.7
2	(Uruguay) Leandro Curbelo	Defensores de M.	18.9
3	(Uruguay) Joaquín Taboada	Yale	18.6
4	(Uruguay) Martín Astramskas	Yale	18.2
5	(Uruguay) Santiago Machado	Albatros	18.1

=== Rebounds ===
Pos	Player	Club	RPG
1	(Brazil) Pedro Peçanha	Juventud	13.3
2	(Uruguay) Javier Crocano	STRS	12.2
3	(Uruguay) Juan Marotta	Defensores de M.	12.0
4	(Uruguay) Santiago Machado	Albatros	11.5
5	(Uruguay) Federico Álvarez	Danubio	11.1

=== Assists ===
Pos	Player	Club	APG
1	(Uruguay) Matías De Gouveia	Albatros	6.6
2	(Uruguay) Andrés Rodríguez	Capurro	6.1
3	(Uruguay) Santiago Meinero	Albatros	5.5
4	(Uruguay) Andrés Piñeiro	Auriblanco	4.9
5	(Uruguay) Brian Silva	Defensores de M.	4.9

=== Blocks ===
Pos	Player	Club	
1	(Uruguay) Rogelio De León	Atenas	1.6
2	(Argentina) Ramiro Trebucq	Auriblanco	1.6
3	(Uruguay) Cristian López	Capurro	1.2
4	(Uruguay) Lucas Silva	Marne	1.1
5	(Argentina) Jonathan Sacco	Marne	1.1

Source: FUBB
