= Liga Uruguaya de Ascenso =

Promotion basketball league in Uruguay

Liga de Ascenso
- First season: 2004
- Country: Uruguay
- Confederation: FIBA Americas
- Number of teams: 14
- Level on pyramid: 2
- Promotion to: Liga Uruguaya de Básquetbol
- Relegation to: DTA
- Current champions: Trouville (1st title) (2026)
- Most championships: Bohemios (3 titles)
- President: (Uruguay) Héctor Cameselle
- TV partners: Tenfield
- Website: www.fubb.org.uy
- 2026 Liga de Ascenso season

The Liga de Ascenso (also known as LDA or Metro; English: Promotion League) is the second most important professional club basketball league in Uruguay. It is organized by the Uruguayan Basketball Federation (FUBB). The competition began in 2004 under the name of Torneo Metropolitano (Metropolitan Tournament). The promotion basketball championships replaced the Campeonato Federal de Segunda de Ascenso.

Trouville is the current champion and Bohemios is the team with more titles, with three.

== Format ==
The LDA is currently played in three stages: Torneo Clasificatorio (Qualifying Tournament), Liguilla (Little League) or Permanencia (Relegation Phase) and playoffs.

- In the Qualifying Tournament, the clubs play each other once, and the first eight of the table play in the Liguilla. The last eight play in the Permanencia.
- In the Liguilla, the clubs play each other once. The first eight advance to the playoffs, and the last two play in the play-in.
- In the Permanencia, the clubs play each other twice, home and away. The two first advance to the play-in and the last four play the play-out.
- The play-in consist of two series at one match, for the two last spots for the playoffs. Te qualifiers are played as: A) 7th of the Liguilla vs. 2nd of the Permanencia, B) 8th of the Liguilla vs. 1st of the Permanencia.
- The teams competed in the play-out, with series at best of three. The first stage is semifinales. The qualifiers are played as: A) 3rd vs. 6th, B) 4th vs. 5th. The losers of those series are relegated to the DTA, and the winners play a final serie to avoid the last relegation spot.
- The teams competed in the playoffs, with series being best of three. The first stage is the quarterfinals. The qualifiers are played as: A) 1st vs. B) play-in winner, B) 2nd vs. A) play-in winner, C) 3rd vs 6th, D) 4th vs. 5th. The semifinal are best of five series, and the pairings are: A) Winner vs. D) Winner and F) Winner vs. G) Winner. The winners of these matches are promoted to the Liga Uruguaya de Básquetbol and play in a single-match final, with the winner being crowned as the champion.

== Participating teams ==
=== 2026 season teams ===
Notes: All statistics are only for the Liga de Ascenso, which is organized by the Uruguayan Basketball Federation (Federación Uruguaya de Basketball). The Campeonato Federal de Ascenso is not included. The "arena" column reflects the arena where the team plays most of its home games, but does not indicate that the team in question is the owner.

Club	City	Arena	Capacity	Foundation	Seasons	Promotions	Championships
Albatros	Montevideo	Gimnasio Albatros (Note: Since these venues do not have an official name, they are mentioned as Gimnasio (Arena) "club name".)	125	1941	1	0	0
Colón	Montevideo	Gimnasio Héctor Chaine	1,000	1907	11	0	0
Lagomar	Ciudad de la Costa	Gimnasio Lagomar	170	1956	9	0	0
Larre Borges	Montevideo	Estadio Romeo Schinca	900	1927	12	2	3
Marne	Montevideo	Gimnasio Marne	300	1953	10	0	0
Montevideo	Montevideo	Gimnasio Héctor Novick	500	1933	6	1	1
Olimpia	Montevideo	Estadio Albérico J. Passadore	500	1918	4	0	0
Olivol Mundial	Montevideo	Gimnasio Marne	175	1931	4	13	0
Sayago	Montevideo	Gimnasio Roberto Moro	660	1923	7	2	0
Stockolmo	Montevideo	Gimnasio Héctor Domínguez	700	1919	17	1	0
Tabaré	Montevideo	Gimnasio Tabaré	800	1931	16	4	2
Trouville	Montevideo	Gimnasio Trouville	780	1922	1	0	0
Urupan	Pando	Gimnasio Santiago Cigliuti	700	1924	2	1	1
Verdirrojo	Montevideo	Gimnasio Verdirrojo	500	1948	22	1	0

== Champions by season ==
Season	Champion	Other promotions	Champion Coach
2004	Bohemios and Sayago (Note: Due to scheduling problems, both teams were proclaimed champions.)		(Uruguay) Ramiro De León and (Uruguay) Héctor Da Pra
2005	Tabaré	Goes	(Uruguay) Daniel Ciechanovecchi
2006	Welcome	Hebraica y Macabi	(Uruguay) Héctor Da Pra
2007	Bohemios	Tabaré	(Uruguay) Ramiro De León
2007	Bohemios	Cordón	(Uruguay) Ramiro De León
2008	Capurro	Aguada	(Uruguay) Federico Camiña
2009	Montevideo	Welcome	(Uruguay) Víctor Hugo Berardi
2010	Guruyú Waston	Larre Borges	(Uruguay) César Somma
2011	Tabaré	Nacional	(Uruguay) Federico Camiña
2012	Atenas	Goes	(Uruguay) José Luis Alonso
2013	Larre Borges	Guruyú Waston	(Uruguay) Daniel Lovera
2014	Urunday Universitario	Welcome	(Uruguay) Héctor Da Pra
2014	Urunday Universitario	Tabaré	(Uruguay) Héctor Da Pra
2015	Cordón	Unión Atlética	(Uruguay) Mathías Nieto
2015	Cordón	Sayago	(Uruguay) Mathías Nieto
2016	Larrañaga	Nacional	(Uruguay) Gonzalo Fernández
2016	Larrañaga	Bohemios	(Uruguay) Gonzalo Fernández
2017	Atenas	Sayago	(Uruguay) Martín Frydman
2017	Atenas	Verdirrojo	(Uruguay) Martín Frydman
2018	Bohemios	Capitol	(Uruguay) Edgardo Kogan
2019	Miramar	Peñarol	(Uruguay) Esteban Yaquinta
2020	Urupan	Olivol Mundial	(Uruguay) Esteban Yaquinta
2022	Larre Borges	Stockolmo	(Uruguay) Mathías Nieto
2023	Urunday Universitario	Welcome	(Uruguay) Héctor Da Pra
2024	Goes	Unión Atlética	(Uruguay) Gustavo Reig
2025	Larrañaga	Atenas	(Uruguay) Guzmán Álvarez
2026	Trouville	Olimpia	(Uruguay) Nicolás Díaz

== Total titles by club ==
Club	Championships	Promotions	Year(s) won
Bohemios	3	4	2004, 2007, 2018
Tabaré	2	5	2005, 2011
Atenas	2	3	2012, 2017
Cordón	2	3	2015, 2022
Larre Borges	2	3	2013, 2021
Larrañaga	2	2	2016, 2025
Urunday Universitario	2	2	2014, 2023
Welcome	1	4	2006
Goes	1	3	2024
Sayago	1	3	2004
Guruyú Waston	1	2	2010
Trouville	1	1	2026
Urupan	1	1	2020
Miramar	1	1	2019
Montevideo	1	1	2009
Capurro	1	1	2008
Unión Atlética	0	2	
Nacional	0	2	
Olimpia	0	1	
Stockolmo	0	1	
Olivol Mundial	0	1	
Peñarol	0	1	
Capitol	0	1	
Verdirrojo	0	1	
Aguada	0	1	
Hebraica y Macabi	0	1	

== See also ==
- Liga Uruguaya de Básquetbol
- Uruguayan Basketball Federation (FUBB)
