= 2024 Liga de Ascenso season =

Uruguayan professional basketball season

Liga de Ascenso
- Season: 2024
- Dates: 15 May 2024 – 22 October 2024
- Games played: 225
- Teams: 15

Regular season
- Top seed: Lagomar
- Season MVP: (Uruguay) Christian Pereira
- Promoted: Goes; Unión Atlética
- Relegated: Olivol Mundial; Sayago

Finals
- Champions: Goes; 1st title
- Runners-up: Unión Atlética
- Semi-finalists: Capitol; Stockolmo

Statistical leaders
Points	(Uruguay) Agustín Zuvich	23.9
Rebounds	(United States) Randy Rickards	14.1
Assists	(Uruguay) Gustavo Barrera	6.9

Records
- Biggest home win: Olimpia 109–68 Capitol (30 July 2024)
- Biggest away win: Stockolmo 54–86 Unión Atlética (16 May 2024)
- Highest scoring: Stockolmo 109–108 Olimpia (29 May 2024)
- Winning streak: 7 games Olimpia; Unión Atlética; Lagomar; Goes
- Losing streak: 7 games Olivol Mundial

The 2024 Liga de Ascenso season, is the 21st season of the second most important Uruguayan professional basketball league, since its establishment in 2003. It started on 15 May 2024 with the regular season and ended on 22 October 2024 with the final.

Goes was the champion, defeating Unión Atlética in the final, and returned to the Liga Uruguaya de Básquetbol after being relegated that same year.

Goes was the first team to be promoted, beating Capitol 3–0 in the semi-finals, being undefetead in the play-offs.

Four days later, Unión Atlética achieved promotion by defeating Stockolmo 3–2, in a controversial tie, as the loser played with many absences in the fifth game, due to the fact that several members of its roster traveled to La Banda to play the Liga Sudamericana de Baloncesto with Defensor Sporting.

== Teams ==
=== Promotion and relegation (pre-season) ===
A total of 15 teams contested the league, including 10 sides from the 2023 season, two promoted from the 2023 DTA, and two relegated from the 2023–24 LUB.

25 de Agosto, which participated last year, forfeited this tournament.

Teams relegated from LUB

- Larre Borges
- Goes

Teams promoted from DTA

- Montevideo
- Bohemios

Teams promoted to LUB

- Urunday Universitario
- Welcome

Teams relegated to DTA

- Atenas
- Miramar

=== Venues and locations ===
Location of teams in 2024 LdA
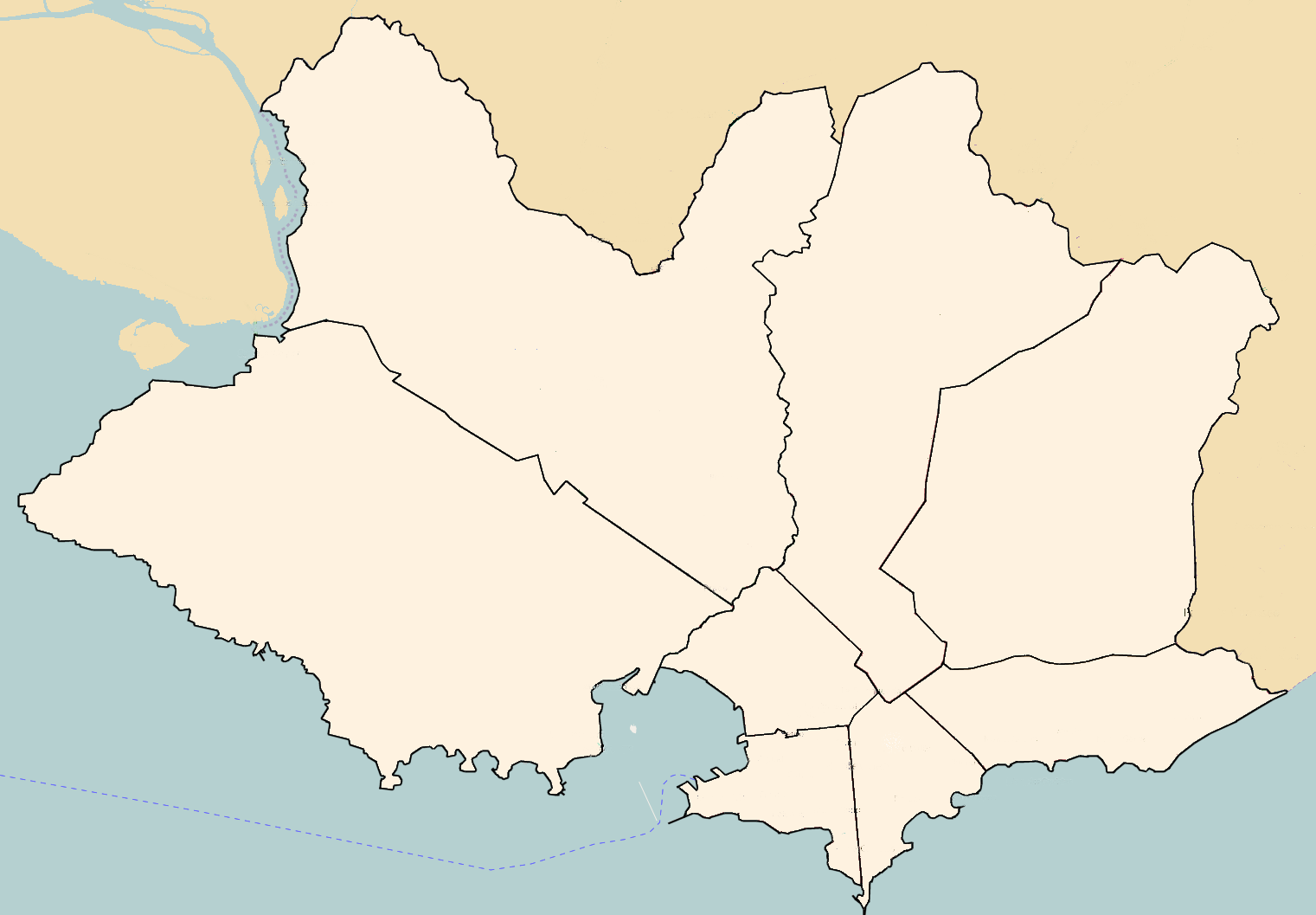
Location of teams from the Montevideo in 2024 LdA

Team	Home City	Arena	Capacity
Bohemios	Montevideo	Estadio Alberto Casal	925
Capitol	Montevideo	Gimnasio Carlos Garbuyo	480
Colón	Montevideo	Gimnasio Héctor Chaine	1,000
Goes	Montevideo	Estadio Plaza de las Misiones	1,800
Lagomar	Ciudad de la Costa	Gimnasio Lagomar (Note: Since these venues do not have an official name, they are mentioned as Gimnasio (Arena) "club name".)	170
Larrañaga	Montevideo	Gimnasio Larrañaga	350
Larre Borges	Montevideo	Estadio Romeo Schinca	900
Montevideo	Montevideo	Gimnasio Héctor Novick	500
Olimpia	Montevideo	Estadio Albérico J. Passadore	500
Olivol Mundial	Montevideo	Gimnasio Olivol Mundial	175
Sayago	Montevideo	Gimnasio Roberto Moro	660
Stockolmo	Montevideo	Gimnasio Héctor Domínguez	700
Tabaré	Montevideo	Gimnasio Tabaré	800
Unión Atlética	Montevideo	Gimnasio Unión Atlética	750
Verdirrojo	Montevideo	Gimnasio Verdirrojo	350

=== Personnel and sponsorship ===
Team	Head coach	Captain	Kit manufacturer
Bohemios	(Uruguay) Juan Carlos Werstein	(Uruguay) Julio Panelli	Concreto
Capitol	(Uruguay) Andrés Borroni	(Uruguay) Claudio Bascou	Giova
Colón	(Uruguay) Agustín Esteve	(Uruguay) Pierino Rüsch	MGR
Goes	(Uruguay) Gustavo Reig	(Uruguay) Christian Pereira	1934
Lagomar	(Uruguay) Alejandro Muro	(Uruguay) Andrés Aristimuño	Kova
Larrañaga	(Uruguay) Guzmán Álvarez	(Uruguay) Mateo Cancela	Podium
Larre Borges	(Uruguay) Daniel Giacoya	(Uruguay) Fernando Verrone	MGR
Montevideo	(Uruguay) Sergio Delgado	(Uruguay) Hernán Álvarez	M user
Olimpia	(Uruguay) Nicolás Altalef	(Uruguay) Nicolás Delgado	Podium
Olivol Mundial	(Uruguay) Luis Silveira	(Uruguay) Ángel Varela	Sporty's
Sayago	(Uruguay) Mathías Nieto	(Uruguay) Germán Silvarrey	Sporty's
Stockolmo	(Uruguay) Gonzalo Fernández	(Uruguay) Nicolás García	Sporty's
Tabaré	(Uruguay) Nicolás Scarabino	(Uruguay) Rodrigo Cardozo	Sporty's
Unión Atlética	(Uruguay) Diego Rivas	(Uruguay) Felipe Trusich	Concreto
Verdirrojo	(Uruguay) Ramiro Caballero	(Uruguay) Martín Mayora	Sports Dreams

=== Managerial changes ===
Team	Outgoing manager	Position in table	Manner of departure	Date of vacancy	Replaced with	Date of appointment
Larrañaga	(Uruguay) Nicolás Díaz	Pre-season	Signed by Cordón	20 September 2023	(Uruguay) Guzmán Álvarez	17 February 2024
Colón	(Uruguay) Fernando Cabrera	Pre-season	End of contract	30 September 2023	(Uruguay) Agustín Esteve	22 December 2023
Olivol Mundial	(Uruguay) Javier Masner	Pre-season	End of contract	30 September 2023	(Uruguay) Marcio Matoso	15 March 2024
Tabaré	(Uruguay) Diego Palacios	Pre-season	Signed by Urupan	31 October 2023	(Uruguay) Nicolás Scarabino	8 January 2024
Olimpia	(Uruguay) Daniel Lovera	Pre-season	End of contract	31 October 2023	(Uruguay) Nicolás Altalef	3 January 2024
Capitol	(Uruguay) Fabián Narbais	Pre-season	Signed by Marne	5 December 2023	(Uruguay) Andrés Borroni	6 March 2024
Bohemios	(Uruguay) Diego Rivas	Pre-season	End of contract	5 January 2024	(Uruguay) Mauricio Rodríguez	24 January 2024
Stockolmo	(Uruguay) Andrés Borroni	Pre-season	Signed by Goes	2 April 2024	(Uruguay) Pablo López (interim)	2 April 2024
Larre Borges	(Uruguay) Mathías Nieto	Pre-season	End of contract	16 April 2024	(Uruguay) Daniel Giacoya	16 April 2024
Stockolmo	(Uruguay) Pablo López	6th (2–2)	End of interim period	7 June 2024	(Uruguay) Gonzalo Fernández	7 June 2024
Sayago	(Uruguay) Germán Fernández	13th (1–5)	Sacked	21 June 2024	(Uruguay) Mathías Nieto	22 June 2024
Bohemios	(Uruguay) Mauricio Rodríguez	8th (6–7)	Sacked	17 July 2024	(Uruguay) Santiago Segovia (interim)	17 July 2024
Bohemios	(Uruguay) Santiago Segovia	7th (6–8)	End of interim period	18 July 2024	(Uruguay) Juan Carlos Werstein	20 July 2024
Olivol Mundial	(Uruguay) Marcio Matoso	15th (2–12)	Resigned	26 July 2024	(Uruguay) Luis Silveira	29 July 2024
Stockolmo	(Uruguay) Gonzalo Fernández	2–2 in semi-finals (18–16)	Travel to Liga Sudamericana de Baloncesto with Defensor Sporting	19 October 2024	(Uruguay) Luis Silveira (intermim)	19 October 2024

== Regular season ==
The Regular season was the first stage of the LDA. The clubs played each other twice, home and away. The first eight of the table will played the play-offs, and the last two were relegated to DTA.

=== League table ===
Pos	Team	Pld	W	L	PF	PA	PD	Pts	Qualification
1	Lagomar	28	17	11	2343	2133	+210	45 (Note: Lagomar 3–1, Olimpia 2–2, Goes 1–3)	Qualification to Play-offs
2	Olimpia (Note: Olimpia were deducted 2 points, due to incidents in game 3 of last season's promotion game, against Welcome. Also, 3 points more were deducted, due to incidents in their match on matchday 27, against Sayago.)	28	21	7	2464	2273	+191	45	Qualification to Play-offs
3	Goes	28	17	11	2245	2182	+63	45	Qualification to Play-offs
4	Larrañaga	28	16	12	2390	2326	+64	44	Qualification to Play-offs
5	Unión Atlética (Note: Unión Atlética were deducted 2 points, due to incidents in game 1 of last season's quarter-finals game, against Urunday Universitario. Also, 3 points more were deducted, for a fight between fans in their match on matchday 10, against Sayago.)	28	19	9	2073	1884	+189	42 (Note: Unión Atlética 5–1; Tabaré 3–3; Capitol 2–4, Stockolmo 2–4 (Capitol 2–0 Stockolmo))	Qualification to Play-offs
6	Tabaré	28	14	14	2202	2218	−16	42	Qualification to Play-offs
7	Capitol	28	14	14	2111	2183	−72	42	Qualification to Play-offs
8	Stockolmo	28	14	14	2134	2135	−1	42	Qualification to Play-offs
9	Colón	28	13	15	2128	2165	−37	41	
10	Verdirrojo (Note: Verdirrojo was deducted 1 point, for throwing a plastic bottle in game 1 of last season's play-out game, against Lagomar.)	28	12	16	2157	2278	−121	39 (Note: Verdirrojo 5–1, Larre Borges 4–2, Bohemios 2–4, Montevideo 1–5)	
11	Larre Borges	28	11	17	2135	2292	−157	39	
12	Bohemios	28	11	17	2239	2290	−51	39	
13	Montevideo	28	11	17	2318	2366	−48	39	
14	Sayago (Note: Sayago were deducted 3 points, for a fight between fans in their match on matchday 10, against Unión Atlética.)	28	13	15	1976	2045	−69	38	Relegation to DTA
15	Olivol Mundial	28	6	22	2180	2325	−145	34	Relegation to DTA

Source: FUBB
Rules for classification: 1) Win–loss record; 2) Head–to–head record; 3) Head–to–head point difference; 4) Point difference; 5) Points scored; 6) Sum of quotients of points scored

=== Results ===
Home \ Away	BOH	CPT	COL	GOE	LAG	LGA	LBO	MON	OLI	OMU	SAY	STO	TAB	UAT	VER
Bohemios	—	63–68	81–84	99–89	66–88	67–84	79–82	84–77	85–78	102–92	100–79	87–75	91–80	75–88	81–68
Capitol	66–63	—	65–75	72–79	72–80	79–74	65–62	65–72	98–89	94–91	80–61	91–78	72–86	71–72	102–111
Colón	77–67	83–74	—	87–76	96–81	82–85	81–67	75–77	67–90	80–68	68–66	67–66	84–88	76–87	77–58
Goes	96–81	64–83	71–61	—	72–81	83–79	94–76	91–80	88–74	90–80	72–67	64–61	74–67	83–75	107–76
Lagomar	83–72	98–69	77–58	97–85	—	104–84	97–68	89–88	72–77	121–86	61–65	58–61	72–81	80–82	103–80
Larrañaga	92–82	80–85	90–74	90–77	77–82	—	83–74	88–110	81–98	107–95	88–82	73–82	90–59	81–80	100–77
Larre Borges	105–83	72–71	76–83	59–81	74–82	92–87	—	89–79	69–94	87–77	84–76	80–78	77–88	68–83	90–97
Montevideo	100–98	69–79	100–95	97–93	86–84	88–96	87–95	—	97–98	98–82	89–83	73–81	90–81	68–88	76–80
Olimpia	83–73	109–68	98–85	87–82	87–91	87–84	92–84	81–73	—	77–79	92–59	84–73	91–85	82–81	87–85
Olivol Mundial	75–81	60–66	74–68	80–88	84–76	77–85	88–76	73–63	75–82	—	66–81	74–77	68–70	66–68	102–65
Sayago	74–81	72–57	81–70	67–70	67–66	77–84	64–62	77–75	83–65	91–72	—	67–64	92–69	(Note: The match was suspended at half-time due to a fight between fans. The Court decided that the game should not continue and that both teams should be declared losers.)	71–66
Stockolmo	75–65	78–86	78–82	74–77	87–79	82–89	84–68	94–84	109–108	75–64	105–66	—	78–72	54–86	1–20 (Note: The match was suspended in the second quarter when Stockolmo fans forced their way into the Arena, despite not being allowed to enter. The Court decided to award the match to Verdirrojo.)
Tabaré	90–81	93–87	77–69	76–70	70–85	82–89	61–64	78–89	79–92	91–84	89–65	101–82	—	58–63	82–62
Unión Atlética	60–71	79–53	71–56	74–65	64–84	83–69	66–68	68–58	81–87	66–59	73–58	78–87	86–66	—	86–65
Verdirrojo	82–81	70–73	76–68	82–64	75–72	86–81	92–67	81–75	87–95	100–89	77–85	92–95	71–83	76–85	—

Source: FUBB
Legend: Blue = home team win; Red = away team win.

== Play-offs ==
The two finalists of this stage were promoted, and played a single-match final to crown the champion.

Quarter-finals
1	Lagomar	75	66	0
8	Stockolmo	92	71	2
4	Larrañaga	63	60	0
5	Unión Atlética	89	74	2
2	Olimpia	70	85	65	1
7	Capitol	78	73	75	2
3	Goes	92	81	2
6	Tabaré	83	66	0

Semi-finals
8	Stockolmo	65	78	73	56	60	2
5	Unión Atlética	78	59	70	84	92	3
7	Capitol	85	70	72	0
3	Goes	90	93	99	3

Final
5	Unión Atlética	71
3	Goes	82

Source: FUBB

== Final standings ==
Pos	Team	Pld	W	L	Seed	Promotion or relegation
Champion
1	Goes	34	23	11	3	Promotion to LUB
Runners-up
2	Unión Atlética	36	24	12	5	Promotion to LUB
Eliminated en semifinals
3	Capitol	34	16	18	7	
4	Stockolmo	35	18	17	8	
Eliminated in quarter-finals
5	Lagomar	30	17	13	1	
6	Olimpia	31	22	9	2	
7	Larrañaga	30	16	14	4	
8	Tabaré	30	14	16	6	
Eliminated at regular season
9	Colón	28	13	15	9	
10	Verdirrojo	28	12	16	10	
11	Larre Borges	28	11	17	11	
12	Bohemios	28	11	17	12	
13	Montevideo	28	11	17	13	
Relegated
14	Sayago	28	13	15	14	Relegated to DTA
15	Olivol Mundial	28	6	22	15	Relegated to DTA

== Statistical leaders ==
=== Points ===
Pos	Player	Club	PPG
1	(Uruguay) Agustín Zuvich	Larrañaga	23.9
2	(United States) Jordan Doss	Sayago	23.0
3	(United States) Randy Rickards	Verdirrojo	22.8
4	(United States) Tirrel Brown	Tabaré	22.5
5	(United States) Zoran Talley	Goes	20.7

=== Rebounds ===
Pos	Player	Club	RPG
1	(United States) Randy Rickards	Verdirrojo	14.1
2	(Brazil) Sergio Conceição	Larre Borges	13.3
3	(Argentina) Tomás Verbauwede	Bohemios	10.6
4	(Brazil) João Demétrio	Sayago	10.4
5	(Uruguay) Sebastián Ottonello	Olimpia	10.3

=== Assists ===
Pos	Player	Club	APG
1	(Uruguay) Gustavo Barrera	Lagomar	6.9
2	(Uruguay) Mauro Zubiaurre	Stockolmo	6.5
3	(Uruguay) Salvador Zanotta	Tabaré	6.2
4	(Uruguay) Martín Perdomo	Bohemios	6.0
5	(Uruguay) Hernán Álvarez	Montevideo	5.8

=== Blocks ===
Pos	Player	Club	BPG
1	(Brazil) Sergio Conceição	Larre Borges	2.5
2	(Brazil) João Demétrio	Sayago	2.1
3	(Uruguay) Nicolás Martínez	Larrañaga	1.7
4	(Cuba) Marlon Díaz	Larre Borges	1.5
5	(Uruguay) Sebastián Ottonello	Olimpia	1.4

Source: FUBB
