= 2023–24 LUB season =

Uruguayan professional basketball season

Liga Uruguaya de Básquetbol
- Season: 2023–24
- Games played: 221
- Teams: 14

Regular season
- Top seed: Peñarol
- Season MVP: (Uruguay) Jayson Granger
- Relegated: Goes; Larre Borges

Finals
- Champions: Aguada; 4th LUB title 11th Uruguayan title
- Runners-up: Peñarol
- Semi-finalists: Nacional; Defensor Sporting
- Finals MVP: (United States) Donald Sims

Statistical leaders
Points	(United States) Donald Sims	23.8
Rebounds	(Dominican Republic) Miguel Simón	13.1
Assists	(Uruguay) Santiago Vidal	7.2

Records
- Biggest home win: Nacional 111–61 Goes (12 January 2024)
- Biggest away win: Hebraica y Macabi 52–93 Nacional (17 April 2024)
- Highest scoring: Aguada 105–111 Nacional (18 January 2024); Aguada 115–101 Nacional (14 May 2024)
- Winning streak: 14 games Peñarol
- Losing streak: 11 games Larre Borges

The 2023–24 LUB season, was the 21st season of the top Uruguayan professional basketball league, since its establishment in 2003. It started on 24 October 2023 with the regular season and ended on 17 June 2024 with the finals.

Hebraica y Macabi was the defending champion which was swept in quarterfinals by Defensor Sporting.

The champion was Aguada, who, repeating much of Biguá's two-time champion team, defeated Peñarol 4–1 in the finals.

== Teams ==
=== Promotion and relegation (pre-season) ===
A total of 14 teams contested the league, including 11 sides from the 2022–23 season, one promoted from the 2022 El Metro and two qualified from the OBL. Tabaré, which achieved promotion, declined to participate in the league.

Teams promoted from El Metro

- Cordón

Teams relegated to El Metro

- Olimpia
- Urunday Universitario

=== Venues and locations ===
Location of teams in 2023–24 LUB
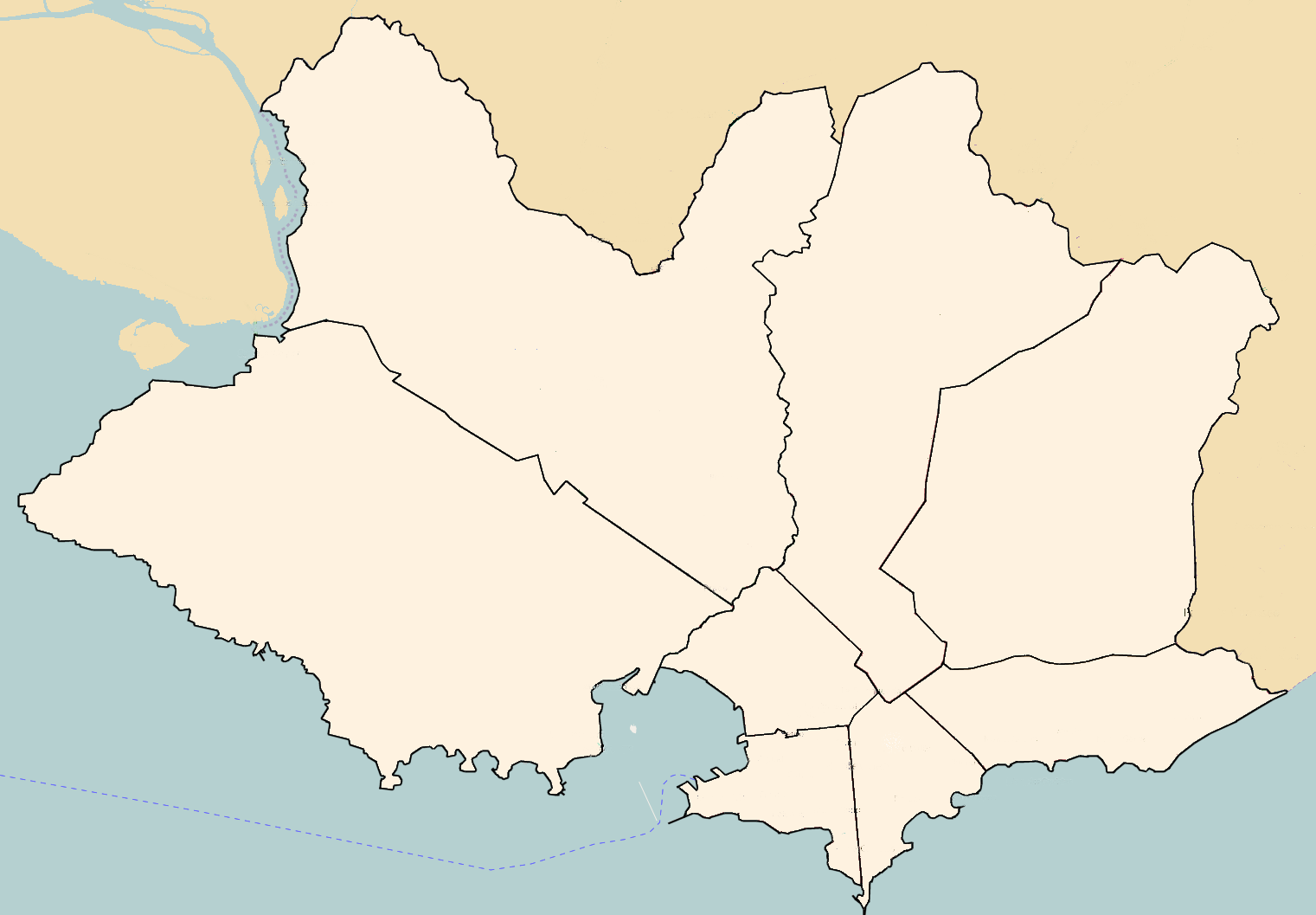
Location of teams from the Montevideo in 2023–24 LUB

Team	Home City	Arena	Capacity
Aguada	Montevideo	Estadio Propio Aguatero	3,738
Biguá	Montevideo	Gimnasio Biguá de Villa Biarritz	1,200
Cordón	Montevideo	Gimnasio Julio C. Zito Barrella	710
Defensor Sporting	Montevideo	Estadio Óscar Magurno	800
Goes	Montevideo	Estadio Plaza de las Misiones	1,800
Hebraica Macabi	Montevideo	Gimnasio Unión Atlética	750
Larre Borges	Montevideo	Estadio Romeo Schinca	900
Malvín	Montevideo	Gimnasio Juan Francisco Canil	900
Nacional	Montevideo	Polideportivo del Gran Parque Central	800
Peñarol	Montevideo	Estadio Cr. Gastón Güelfi	4,700
Racing	Mercedes	Gimnasio Agrimensor Mario Eduardo Bellini	400
Remeros	Mercedes	Gimnasio Agrimensor Mario Eduardo Bellini	400
Trouville	Montevideo	Gimnasio Trouville	780
Urupan	Pando	Gimnasio Santiago A. Cigliuti	700

=== Personnel and sponsorship ===
Team	Head coach	Captain	Kit manufacturer
Aguada	(Uruguay) Germán Cortizas	(Uruguay) Juan Santiso	Puma
Biguá	(Uruguay) Nicolás Mazzarino	(Uruguay) Leandro García Morales	B31
Cordón	(Uruguay) Nicolás Díaz	(Uruguay) Federico Bavosi	MGR
Defensor Sporting	(Uruguay) Gonzalo Fernández	(Uruguay) Federico Soto	Kelme
Goes	(Uruguay) Gustavo Reig	(Uruguay) Álex López	1934
Hebraica y Macabi	(Uruguay) Leonardo Zylbersztein	(Uruguay) Luciano Parodi	Concreto
Larre Borges	(Uruguay) Mathías Nieto	(Uruguay) Mauro Zubiaurre	MGR
Malvín	(Uruguay) Federico Camiña	(Uruguay) Kiril Wachsmann	Joma
Nacional	(Uruguay) Álvaro Ponce	(Uruguay) Alejandro Acosta	Umbro
Peñarol	(Uruguay) Marcelo Signorelli	(Uruguay) Jayson Granger	Puma
Racing	(Uruguay) Claudio Batista	(Uruguay) Nicolás Ibarra	MGR
Remeros	(Uruguay) Ignacio Borges	(Uruguay) Fernando Siniestro	MGR
Trouville	(Uruguay) Pablo Morales	(Uruguay) Santiago Fernández	Xu
Urupan	(Uruguay) Diego Palacios	(Uruguay) Mateo Sarni	MGR

=== Managerial changes ===
Team	Outgoing manager	Manner of departure	Date of vacancy	Position in table	Replaced with	Date of appointment
Cordón	(Uruguay) Álvaro Ponce	Signed by Nacional	9 December 2022	Pre-season	(Uruguay) Nicolás Díaz	16 June 2023
Goes	(Argentina) Guillermo Narvarte	Signed by (Venezuela) Trotamundos de Carabobo	10 April 2023	Pre-season	(Uruguay) Luis Silveira	30 June 2023
Trouville	(Uruguay) Marcelo Signorelli	End of contract	12 April 2023	Pre-season	(Uruguay) Pablo Morales	19 April 2023
Goes	(Uruguay) Luis Silveira	Sacked	4 November 2023	12th (0–3)	(Uruguay) Andrés Borroni	4 November 2023
Peñarol	(Uruguay) Pablo López	Sacked	3 December 2023	12th (4–2)	(Uruguay) Marcelo Signorelli	5 December 2023
Biguá	(Uruguay) Diego Cal	Sacked	15 December 2023	4th (6–7)	(Uruguay) Nicolás Mazzarino (interim)	15 December 2023
Biguá	(Uruguay) Nicolás Mazzarino	End of interim period	18 December 2023	2nd (7–7)	(Argentina) Gregorio Martínez	20 December 2023
Goes	(Uruguay) Andrés Borroni	Sacked	31 January 2024	12th (5–13)	(Uruguay) Gustavo Reig	1 February 2024
Biguá	(Argentina) Gregorio Martínez	Resigned	12 March 2024	8th (10–13)	(Uruguay) Nicolás Mazzarino	12 March 2024

== Torneo Clasificatorio ==
The Torneo Clasificatorio (Qualifying Tournament) was the first stage of the LUB. The metropolitan clubs played each other twice, home and away, and the first six of the table played in the Ronda Título, where all is guaranteed to participate in the playoffs. The last six played the Reclasificatorio.

=== League table ===
Pos	Team	Pld	W	L	PF	PA	PD	Pts	Qualification
1	Peñarol	22	18	4	1802	1543	+259	40	Qualification to Ronda Título
2	Aguada	22	17	5	1967	1774	+193	39	Qualification to Ronda Título
3	Nacional	22	16	6	1945	1779	+166	38	Qualification to Ronda Título
4	Defensor Sporting	22	15	7	1786	1719	+67	37	Qualification to Ronda Título
5	Hebraica y Macabi	22	14	8	1845	1770	+75	36	Qualification to Ronda Título
6	Cordón	22	10	12	1595	1643	−48	32 (Note: Cordón 143–143 Biguá (Note: Although Biguá obtained qualification for the Title Round, after Cordón's claim, the FUBB's Courts of Disputes and Appeals decided Cordón's qualification, having been the team that obtained the highest score in the matches between them (Cordón 77, Biguá 72)))	Qualification to Ronda Título
7	Biguá	22	10	12	1858	1858	0	32	Qualficiation to Reclasificatorio
8	Malvín	22	9	13	1790	1779	+11	31	Qualficiation to Reclasificatorio
9	Urupan	22	7	15	1710	1856	−146	29 (Note: Urupan 2–0 Trouville)	Qualficiation to Reclasificatorio
10	Trouville	22	7	15	1761	1897	−136	29	Qualficiation to Reclasificatorio
11	Goes	22	6	16	1730	1878	−148	25 (Note: Goes were deducted 3 points, due to incidents in game 3 of last season's play-in, against Larre Borges)	Qualficiation to Reclasificatorio
12	Larre Borges	22	3	19	1684	1977	−293	25 (Note: Goes 2–0 Larre Borges)	Qualficiation to Reclasificatorio

Source: FUBB
Rules for classification: 1) Win–loss record; 2) Head–to–head record; 3) Head–to–head point difference; 4) Point difference; 5) Points scored; 6) Sum of quotients of points scored

=== Results ===
Home \ Away	AGU	BIG	COR	DSC	GOE	HYM	LBO	MAL	NAC	PEÑ	TRO	UPA
Aguada	—	82–62	78–75	92–77	105–91	96–86	94–86	87–85	105–111	77–76	81–69	91–58
Biguá	81–94	—	71–66	87–82	94–91	67–80	94–61	89–75	101–94	81–87	97–82	79–84
Cordón	70–89	77–72	—	74–76	80–71	70–87	81–66	75–69	65–98	67–75	83–97	64–57
Defensor Sporting	85–70	96–86	75–67	—	84–80	78–84	92–77	85–82	91–99	72–79	88–84	78–67
Goes	74–75	91–86	75–84	73–87	—	76–75	80–64	76–78	92–98	77–62	85–93	74–80
Hebraica y Macabi	84–79	93–59	55–66	70–64	85–79	—	94–78	105–99	99–107	73–90	102–85	93–90
Larre Borges	83–104	80–106	83–79	75–85	80–83	88–83	—	89–96	82–94	52–57	84–90	100–88
Malvín	77–87	73–84	78–62	73–75	92–76	84–90	103–70	—	83–84	83–82	92–70	80–73
Nacional	77–68	71–67	86–61	65–72	111–61	79–83	95–67	84–79	—	77–97	83–81	91–78
Peñarol	88–87	92–90	65–75	81–64	90–65	73–52	89–62	82–58	79–68	—	88–52	90–64
Trouville	82–90	92–83	57–72	77–92	90–83	93–74	93–75	75–82	79–99	83–91	—	53–85
Urupan	74–111	90–99	63–82	77–88	85–87	80–98	97–82	79–61	89–74	64–89	88–84	—

Source: FUBB
Legend: Blue = home team win; Red = away team win.

== Ronda Título ==
The Ronda Título (Title Round) was a stage played to organize the first six teams in the Torneo Clasificatorio, in the play-offs. The clubs played each other twice, home and away. The teams accumulated their points to that obtained in the first stage.

=== League table ===
Pos	Team	Pld	W	L	PF	PA	PD	Pts	Qualification
1	Peñarol	32	24	8	2630	2307	+323	56 (Note: Peñarol 327–323 Aguada)	Qualification to Play-offs
2	Aguada	32	24	8	2867	2599	+268	56	Qualification to Play-offs
3	Nacional	31	21	10	2668	2468	+200	52	Qualification to Play-offs
4	Defensor Sporting	31	20	11	2507	2451	+56	51	Qualification to Play-offs
5	Hebraica y Macabi	31	17	14	2584	2608	−24	48	Qualification to Play-offs
6	Cordón	31	12	19	2280	2391	−111	43	Qualification to Play-offs

Source: FUBB
Rules for classification: 1) Win–loss record; 2) Head–to–head record; 3) Head–to–head point difference; 4) Point difference; 5) Points scored; 6) Sum of quotients of points scored

=== Results ===
Home \ Away	AGU	COR	DSC	HYM	NAC	PEÑ
Aguada	—	82–88	82–77	92–74	103–89	77–82
Cordón	74–97	—	79–89	(Note: As the positions were already defined, the match was canceled)	86–67	68–84
Defensor Sporting	91–85	79–60	—	92–76	58–95	67–83
Hebraica y Macabi	86–113	91–88	103–96	—	52–93	82–99
Nacional	83–87	69–61	(Note: The match was suspended due to incidents at the end of the second quarter, when Nacional led 33–29. By mutual agreement, the teams decided not to finish the match, leaving the game without result.)	66–101	—	94–78
Peñarol	81–82	90–81	69–72	99–74	63–67	—

Source: FUBB
Legend: Blue = home team win; Red = away team win.

== Reclasificatorio ==
The Reclasificatorio (Requalifier) was a stage played by the last six teams in the Torneo Clasificatorio. The clubs played each other twice, home and away. The teams accumulated their points to that obtained in the first stage. This stage defined the teams qualified for the play-in and the relegated teams.

=== League table ===
Pos	Team	Pld	W	L	PF	PA	PD	Pts	Qualification or relegation
1	Malvín	32	19	13	2549	2415	+134	51	Qualification to Play-in second stage
2	Biguá	32	15	17	2643	2634	+9	47	Qualification to Play-in second stage
3	Trouville	31	13	18	2368	2443	−75	44	Qualficiation to Play-in first stage
4	Urupan	31	11	20	2380	2534	−154	42	Qualficiation to Play-in first stage
5	Goes	30	10	20	2346	2493	−147	37 (Note: Goes were deducted 3 points, due to incidents in game 3 of last season's play-in, against Larre Borges)	Relegation to Liga de Ascenso
6	Larre Borges	27	3	24	2073	2552	−479	30	Relegation to Liga de Ascenso

Source: FUBB
Rules for classification: 1) Win–loss record; 2) Head–to–head record; 3) Head–to–head point difference; 4) Point difference; 5) Points scored; 6) Sum of quotients of points scored

=== Results ===
Home \ Away	BIG	GOE	LBO	MAL	TRO	UPA
Biguá	—	91–85	20–0 (Note: Larre Borges left the tournament after the first five matchdays)	81–82	76–87	83–73
Goes	77–87	—	20–0	87–92	0–20 (Note: Goes left the tournament after his relegation was confirmed)	73–79
Larre Borges	109–111	81–102	—	0–20	0–20	72–84
Malvín	103–91	20–0	86–62	—	81–71	92–84
Trouville	73–67	67–80	92–65	82–90	—	
Urupan	87–78	78–92	20–0	78–93	87–95	—

Source: FUBB
Legend: Blue = home team win; Red = away team win.

== OBL ==
The Organización de Básquetbol del Litoral (Litoral Basketball Organization) tournament was played by the champions and runners-up of the regional leagues of Paysandú Department and Soriano. The finalists obtained their classification to the LUB play-in, the champion faced the 4th in the Reclasificatorio and the runner-up, the 3rd.

=== First stage ===
In the first stage, the Soriano teams played against the teams from the Paysandú Department, two matches in Mercedes and two in Paysandú. The champions of their regional leagues (Remeros and Pelotaris) began with an additional point. This stage will serve to organize the position of the teams in the Final 4

==== Table ====
Pos	Team	Pld	W	L	PF	PA	PD	Pts
1	Racing	2	2	0	173	155	+18	**4**
2	Remeros	2	1	1	161	145	+16	**4**
3	Pelotaris	2	1	1	162	164	−2	**4**
4	Paysandú Wanderers	2	0	2	138	170	−32	**2**

Source: FUBB
Rules for classification: 1) Points; 2) Point difference

==== Results ====
Home \ Away	RAC	REM	PEL	WAN
Racing	—	—	—	88–77
Remeros	—	—	—	82–61
Pelotaris	78–85	84–79	—	—
Paysandú Wanderers	—	—	—	—

Source: FUBB
Legend: Blue = home team win; Red = away team win.

=== Final 4 ===
The Final 4 was hosted by Mercedes.

Teams in bold advanced to the next round. The numbers to the left of each team indicate the team's seeding, the numbers to the right indicate the result of games including result in bold of the team that won in that game, and the numbers furthest to the right indicate the number of games the team won in that round.

Semi-finals
**1**	**Racing**	**97**
4	Paysandú Wanderers	86
**2**	**Remeros**	**84**
3	Pelotaris	60

Final
1	Racing	72
**2**	**Remeros**	**80**

Source: FUBB

== Play-in ==
The winner of this bracket obtained 7th place in play-offs

First stage					Second stage
					1R	Malvín	88	74	77	2
1O	Remeros	81	74	0	4R	Urupan	86	99	68	1
4R	Urupan	90	81	2

The winner of this bracket obtained 8th place in play-offs

First stage						Second stage
						2R	Biguá	76	81	79	1
2O	Racing	81	85	83	1	3R	Trouville	79	70	81	2
3R	Trouville	90	70	85	2

Source: FUBB

== Play-offs ==
Quarter-finals
1	Peñarol	92	92	87	3
8	Trouville	87	64	77	0
4	Defensor Sporting	89	88	97	3
5	Hebraica y Macabi	84	73	73	0
2	Aguada	91	83	100	3
7	Malvín	67	81	95	0
3	Nacional	60	72	81	78	3
6	Cordón	73	66	68	66	1

Semi-finals
1	Peñarol	89	68	76	80	103	3
4	Defensor Sporting	74	87	80	61	66	2
2	Aguada	115	89	92	97	3
3	Nacional	101	98	87	82	1

Finals
1	Peñarol	65	90	95	74	71	1
2	Aguada	66	97	78	88	88	4

Source: FUBB

== Final standings ==
Pos	Team	Pld	W	L	Seed	Qualification or relegation
Champion
1	Aguada (Note: Although Aguada and Peñarol qualified for the Basketball Champions League Americas, both refused to participate in the tournament. Biguá took one of the vacant spots, as a guest.)	44	34	10	2	
Runners-up
2	Peñarol	44	31	14	1	
Eliminated at semi-finals
3	Nacional	39	25	14	3	Qualification to Liga Sudamericana de Baloncesto
4	Defensor Sporting	39	25	14	4	Qualification to Liga Sudamericana de Baloncesto
Eliminated at quarter-finals
5	Hebraica y Macabi	34	17	17	5	
6	Cordón	35	13	22	6	
7	Malvín	38	21	17	7	
8	Trouville	40	17	23	9	
Eliminated at play-in second round
9	Biguá	40	16	19	8	Qualification to Basketball Champions League Americas
10	Urupan	40	14	22	10	
Eliminated at play-in first round
11	Remeros	2	0	2	1 OBL	
12	Racing	3	1	2	2 OBL	
Relegated
13	Goes	30	10	20	11	Relegation to Liga de Ascenso
14	Larre Borges	27	3	24	12	Relegation to Liga de Ascenso

== Statistical leaders ==
=== Points ===
Pos	Player	Club	PPG
1	(United States) Donald Sims	Aguada	23.8
2	(United States) Malik Curry	Defensor Sporting	21.5
3	(United States) Justin Moss	Larre Borges	21.4
4	(Dominican Republic) Miguel Simón	Urupan	20.1
5	(United States) Michael Smith	Nacional	19.9

=== Rebounds ===
Pos	Player	Club	RPG
1	(Dominican Republic) Miguel Simón	Urupan	13.1
2	(United States) Chaz Crawford	Cordón	12.7
3	(United States) Gary McGhee	Goes	10.9
4	(United States) Frank Hassell	Hebraica y Macabi	10.0
5	(Dominican Republic) Luis Santos	Aguada	10.0

=== Assists ===
Pos	Player	Club	APG
1	(Uruguay) Santiago Vidal	Aguada	7.2
2	(Uruguay) Mateo Sarni	Urupan	7.0
3	(Uruguay) Jayson Granger	Peñarol	6.5
4	(United States) Daniel Hamilton	Malvín	5.8
5	(Uruguay) Manuel Romero	Hebraica y Macabi	5.4

=== Blocks ===
Pos	Player	Club	BPG
1	(Senegal) Malik Dime	Peñarol	2.4
2	(Rwanda) Prince Ibeh	Peñarol	2.3
3	(United States) Rakeem Christmas	Biguá	1.8
4	(United States) LaRon Smith	Larre Borges	1.8
5	(United States) Eric Anderson	Nacional	1.6

Source: FUBB

== Awards ==
All official awards of the 2023–24 LUB season.

=== Season MVP ===
Pos.	Player	Team
PG	(United States) Donald Sims	Aguada

=== National regular season MVP ===
Pos.	Player	Team
PG	(Uruguay) Jayson Granger	Peñarol

=== Foreign season MVP ===
Pos.	Player	Team
PG	(United States) Donald Sims	Aguada

=== Finals MVP ===
Pos.	Player	Team
PG	(United States) Donald Sims	Aguada

=== Defensive Player of the regular season Award ===
Pos.	Player	Team
SG	(Uruguay) Patricio Prieto	Nacional

=== Rookie Player of the regular season Award ===
Pos.	Player	Team
PG	(Uruguay) Santiago Calimares	Hebraica y Macabi

== LUB clubs in international competitions ==
Basketball Champions League Americas
Team	Progress	Result	W–L
Hebraica y Macabi	Third place game	Loss vs. (Asociación Deportiva Mexicana de Básquetbol) Halcones de Xalapa	4–7
Hebraica y Macabi	Semi-finals	Loss vs. (Argentine Basketball Confederation) Quimsa	4–7
Hebraica y Macabi	Quarter-finals	2–1 vs. (Brazilian Basketball Confederation) Franca	4–7
Hebraica y Macabi	Group C	2nd of 3 teams (2–4)	4–7
Nacional	Quarter-finals	1–2 vs. (Asociación Deportiva Mexicana de Básquetbol) Halcones de Xalapa	4–5
Nacional	Group B	2nd of 3 teams (3–3)	4–5

Liga Sudamericana de Baloncesto
Team	Progress	Result	W–L
Peñarol	Final 6 third round	Loss vs. (Argentine Basketball Confederation) Instituto	2–3
Peñarol	Final 6 first round	Loss vs. (Federación Colombiana de Baloncesto) Caribbean Storm	2–3
Peñarol	Group B	1st of 4 teams (2–1)	2–3
Biguá	Group C	3rd of 4 teams (1–2)	1–2
Malvín	Group A	4th of 4 teams (0–3)	0–3
