= 2023 El Metro season =

Uruguayan professional basketball season

El Metro
- Season: 2023
- Dates: 8 June 2024 – 14 October 2024
- Games played: 200
- Teams: 16

Regular season
- Top seed: Urunday Universitario
- Season MVP: (Uruguay) Demian Álvarez
- Promoted: Urunday Universitario; Welcome
- Relegated: Atenas; Miramar

Finals
- Champions: Urunday Universitario; 2nd title
- Runners-up: Welcome
- Semi-finalists: Olimpia; Tabaré

Statistical leaders
Points	(Uruguay) Theo Metzger	25.0
Rebounds	(Colombia) Santiago Serna	13.0
Assists	(Uruguay) Facundo Terra	7.6

Records
- Biggest home win: Olimpia 106–67 Capitol (17 July 2024)
- Biggest away win: Unión Atlética 48–82 Urunday Universitario (15 September 2024)
- Highest scoring: Urunday Universitario 103–99 Atenas (29 August 2024)
- Winning streak: 8 games Urunday Universitario; Tabaré
- Losing streak: 11 games Miramar

The 2023 El Metro season, is the 20th season of the second most important Uruguayan professional basketball league, since its establishment in 2003. It started on 8 June 2024 with four games of the regular season and ended on 14 October 2024 with the game 3 of the second promotion play-off.

Urunday Universitario was the champion, defeating Olimpia in three games, and returned to the Liga Uruguaya de Básquetbol after being relegated that same year.

Welcome achieved the second promotion by defeating Olimpia in the second promotion play-off by reversing the serie by 2–1. This generated controversy because Olimpia had won the semi-final against Welcome, so the play-off for the second promotion was eliminated in 2024 season.

== Teams ==
=== Promotion and relegation (pre-season) ===
A total of 16 teams contested the league, including 12 sides from the 2022 season, two promoted from the 2022 DTA, and two relegated from the 2022–23 LUB.

Tabaré, who had obtained one of the promotions the previous year, sold the place to the FUBB, which accepted in search of reducing the number of teams in the LUB to 12.

Teams relegated from LUB

- Olimpia
- Urunday Universitario

Teams promoted from DTA

- Atenas
- Welcome

Teams promoted to LUB

- Cordón

Teams relegated to DTA

- San Telmo Rápido Sport

=== Venues and locations ===
Location of teams in 2023 El Metro
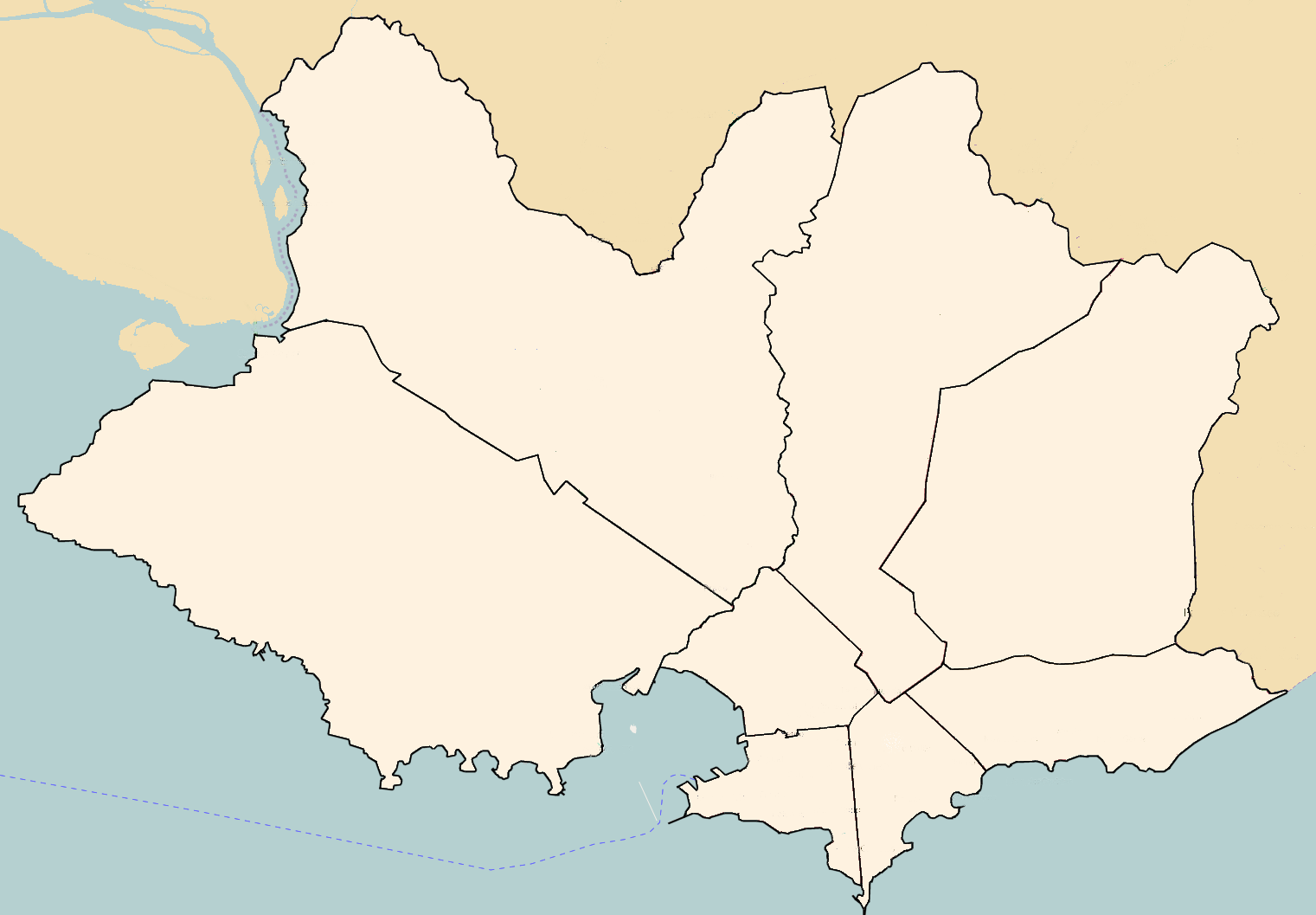
Location of teams from the Montevideo in 2023 El Metro

Team	Home City	Arena	Capacity
25 de Agosto	Montevideo	Gimnasio 25 de Agosto (Note: Since these venues do not have an official name, they are mentioned as Gimnasio (Arena) "club name".)	350
Atenas	Montevideo	Estadio Antonio María Borderes	1,565
Capitol	Montevideo	Gimnasio Carlos Garbuyo	480
Colón	Montevideo	Gimnasio Héctor Chaine	1,000
Lagomar	Ciudad de la Costa	Gimnasio Lagomar	170
Larrañaga	Montevideo	Gimnasio Larrañaga	350
Miramar	Montevideo	Gimnasio Miramar	200
Olimpia	Montevideo	Estadio Albérico J. Passadore	500
Olivol Mundial	Montevideo	Gimnasio Olivol Mundial	175
Sayago	Montevideo	Gimnasio Roberto Moro	660
Stockolmo	Montevideo	Gimnasio Héctor Domínguez	700
Tabaré	Montevideo	Gimnasio Tabaré	800
Unión Atlética	Montevideo	Gimnasio Unión Atlética	750
Urunday Universitario	Montevideo	Gimnasio Urunday Universitario	700
Verdirrojo	Montevideo	Gimnasio Verdirrojo	350
Welcome	Montevideo	Estadio Óscar Magurno	800

=== Personnel and sponsorship ===
Team	Head coach	Captain	Kit manufacturer
25 de Agosto	(Uruguay) Gustavo Reig	(Uruguay) Martín Couñago	Sporty's
Atenas	(Uruguay) Santiago Segovia	(Uruguay) Luciano Planells	Kelme
Capitol	(Uruguay) Fabián Narbais	(Uruguay) Juan Wenzel	Giova
Colón	(Uruguay) Ernesto Dorrego	(Uruguay) Andrés Aristimuño	
Lagomar	(Uruguay) Alejandro Muro	(Uruguay) Diego Tortajada	Borac
Larrañaga	(Uruguay) Nicolás Díaz	(Uruguay) Camilo Colman	Podium
Olimpia	(Uruguay) Daniel Lovera	(Uruguay) Santiago Fernández	Podium
Olivol Mundial	(Uruguay) Javier Masner	(Uruguay) Emilio Taboada	Sporty's
Sayago	(Uruguay) Germán Fernández	(Uruguay) Martín Aguilera	Sporty's
Stockolmo	(Uruguay) Andrés Borroni	(Uruguay) Facundo Terra	Sporty's
Tabaré	(Uruguay) Diego Palacios	(Uruguay) Martín Perdomo	Sporty's
Unión Atlética	(Uruguay) Santiago Gómez	(Uruguay) Felipe Trusich	Concreto
Urunday Universitario	(Uruguay) Héctor Da Pra	(Uruguay) Nicolás Delgado	Giova
Verdirrojo	(Uruguay) Ramiro Caballero	(Uruguay) Nicolás Gentini	Concreto
Welcome	(Uruguay) Diego Rivas	(Uruguay) Ángel Varela	M

=== Managerial changes ===
Team	Outgoing manager	Position in table	Manner of departure	Date of vacancy	Replaced with	Date of appointment
Sayago	(Uruguay) Carlos Barrios	Pre-season	End of contract	30 September 2022	(Uruguay) Germán Fernández	28 February 2023
Larrañaga	(Uruguay) Sergio Delgado	Pre-season	End of contract	30 September 2022	(Uruguay) Nicolás Díaz	5 February 2023
Stockolmo	(Uruguay) Guido Fernández	Pre-season	End of contract	30 September 2022	(Uruguay) Andrés Borroni	17 March 2023
Unión Atlética	(Uruguay) Daniel Lovera	Pre-season	Signed by Olimpia	13 December 2022	(Uruguay) Esteban Yaquinta	8 March 2023
Atenas	(Uruguay) Martín Sedes	Pre-season	End of contract	31 December 2022	(Uruguay) Santiago Segovia	31 January 2023
Welcome	(Uruguay) Sebastián Barbieri	Pre-season	End of contract	31 December 2022	(Uruguay) Diego Rivas	27 April 2023
Capitol	(Uruguay) Gonzalo Fernández	Pre-season	Signed by Defensor Sporting	11 January 2023	(Uruguay) Fabián Narbais	29 March 2023
Olivol Mundial	(Uruguay) Germán Cortizas	Pre-season	Signed by Aguada	30 May 2023	(Uruguay) Javier Masner	24 March 2023
Verdirrojo	(Uruguay) Ignacio Ortega	16th (0–6)	Resigned	3 July 2023	(Uruguay) Ramiro Caballero	3 July 2023
Atenas	(Uruguay) Santiago Segovia	9th (5–6)	Resigned	18 July 2023	(Uruguay) Mauricio Rodríguez	19 July 2023
Colón	(Uruguay) Ernesto Dorrego	12th (5–6)	Sacked	22 July 2024	(Uruguay) Fernando Cabrera	22 July 2024
Miramar	(Uruguay) Andrés Blazina	16th (2–11)	Resigned	31 July 2024	(Uruguay) Guido Fernández	31 July 2024
Unión Atlética	(Uruguay) Esteban Yaquinta	9th (8–8)	Resigned	9 August 2024	(Uruguay) Santiago Gómez	12 August 2024

== Regular season ==
The Regular season was the first stage of the El Metro. The clubs played each other once, with the home team determined by draw. The first eight of the table played the Fase Campeonato (Championship Phase), and the last eight played the Fase Descenso (Relegation Phase).

=== League table ===
Pos	Team	Pld	W	L	PF	PA	PD	Pts	Qualification
1	Urunday Universitario	15	12	3	1259	1099	+160	27	Qualification to Fase Campeonato
2	Olimpia	15	11	4	1169	1078	+91	26	Qualification to Fase Campeonato
3	Tabaré	15	10	5	1138	1074	+64	25	Qualification to Fase Campeonato
4	Capitol	15	9	6	1167	1155	+12	24 (Note: Capitol 3–0, Sayago 2–1, Welcome 1–2, Larrañaga 0–3)	Qualification to Fase Campeonato
5	Sayago	15	9	6	1208	1132	+76	24	Qualification to Fase Campeonato
6	Welcome	15	9	6	1154	1117	+37	24	Qualification to Fase Campeonato
7	Larrañaga	15	9	6	1156	1130	+26	24	Qualification to Fase Campeonato
8	Unión Atlética	15	8	7	1267	1219	+48	23 (Note: Unión Atlética 1–0 Atenas)	Tiebreak (Note: With two teams tied for eighth place, a tiebreak determined the last team to qualify for the Championship Round.)
9	Atenas	15	8	7	1208	1192	+16	23	Tiebreak
10	Colón	15	7	8	1174	1157	+17	22	Qualification to Fase Descenso
11	Olivol Mundial	15	6	9	1144	1174	−30	21 (Note: Olivol Mundial 1–0 Stockolmo)	Qualification to Fase Descenso
12	Stockolmo	15	6	9	1166	1200	−34	21	Qualification to Fase Descenso
13	Verdirrojo	15	5	10	1000	1127	−127	20 (Note: Verdirrojo 1–0 25 de Agosto)	Qualification to Fase Descenso
14	25 de Agosto	15	5	10	1086	1098	−12	20	Qualification to Fase Descenso
15	Lagomar	15	4	11	1113	1265	−152	19	Qualification to Fase Descenso
16	Miramar	15	2	13	1025	1217	−192	17	Qualification to Fase Descenso

Source: FUBB
Rules for classification: 1) Win–loss record; 2) Head–to–head record; 3) Head–to–head point difference; 4) Point difference; 5) Points scored; 6) Sum of quotients of points scored

=== Results ===
Home \ Away	25A	ATE	CPT	COL	LAG	LGA	MIR	OLI	OMU	SAY	STO	TAB	UAT	UUN	VER	WEL
25 de Agosto			82–63	76–84				63–74	90–77	66–52	79–58			76–91		
Atenas	83–62						72–71	82–69		75–85	83–78	72–74		78–89		
Capitol		88–79			85–68				94–61			65–79	84–78		20–1 (Note: The match was suspended due to incidents. The Court ruled that Verdirrojo was responsible for the suspension and awarded the victory to Capitol.)	84–74
Colón		82–93	89–83		96–62				79–80				97–99		93–73	63–62
Lagomar	68–92	82–89				76–79	70–57			88–90	90–81	71–90			76–71	
Larrañaga	78–59	85–66	72–90	64–57			84–75		76–73			72–90	91–90			
Miramar	62–59		76–102	56–72				77–80		66–96	80–76			67–83		
Olimpia			106–67	86–66	86–71	75–72			79–68				82–67		85–59	90–76
Olivol Mundial		56–82			97–75		98–65					72–75	81–75		64–83	58–65
Sayago			79–94	87–89		90–76		75–79	88–72				85–72	64–72		82–80
Stockolmo			75–72	79–74		77–72		75–65	80–86	82–76			83–82	89–94		
Tabaré	62–61			77–76			94–70	79–62		53–72	84–76			77–79		
Unión Atlética	75–68	99–75			86–87		77–63					87–75			96–72	95–92
Urunday U.			97–76	80–57	98–72	70–78		81–51	68–71				84–89			94–87
Verdirrojo	85–75	74–84				71–87	79–77			68–87	79–78	68–61		67–79		
Welcome	86–78	98–95			68–57	71–61	75–63				84–79	71–68			65–50	

Source: FUBB
Legend: Blue = home team win; Red = away team win.

=== Tiebreak ===
8 August 2024
20:15 UTC−3

Report

Unión Atlética	64–71	Atenas
Scoring by quarter: 14–22, 17–12, 21–12, 12–25
Pts: Dotti 13; Rebs: McClenton, García 10; Asts: Dotti 4		Pts: Zuvich 20; Rebs: Zuvich 13; Asts: Planells 7

Estadio Romeo Schinca, Montevideo
Attendance: 0 (Note: Due to threats between the fans of both teams, the FUBB decided to play the match without fans.)
Referees: Andrés Bartel, Washington Chamorro, Alejandro Nadruz

== Fase Campeonato ==
The Fase Campeonato (Championship Phase) was a stage played to organize the first seven teams in the play-offs. The eighth team will have to play the play-in against the first team in the Relegation Phase, to determine the last team to qualify for the playoffs. The clubs played each other once, with the home team determined by draw. The teams accumulated their points to that obtained in the Torneo Classificatorio.

=== League table ===
Pos	Team	Pld	W	L	PF	PA	PD	Pts	Qualification
1	Urunday Universitario	22	18	4	1910	1659	+251	40	Qualification to Play-offs
2	Olimpia	22	15	7	1774	1654	+120	37	Qualification to Play-offs
3	Welcome	22	14	8	1649	1570	+79	36 (Note: Welcome 1–0 Tabaré (Note: Since the direct clashes were not in home-away format, the FUBB decided that for the tiebreakers, only the matches of the Fase Campeonato will count.))	Qualification to Play-offs
4	Tabaré	22	14	8	1646	1566	+80	36	Qualification to Play-offs
5	Larrañaga	22	12	10	1668	1721	−53	34 (Note: Larrañaga 1–0 Sayago)	Qualification to Play-offs
6	Sayago	22	12	10	1786	1721	+65	34	Qualification to Play-offs
7	Capitol	22	11	11	1702	1715	−13	33	Qualification to Play-offs
8	Atenas (Note: Atenas was deducted 4 points for violating the security protocol when its fans forced their way into the tiebreak match, against Unión Atlética where the public was prohibited from entering. Also 3 points more were deducted, due to incidents in their match, on matchday 4 of the Fase Campeonato, against Urunday Universitario. Finally, 6 more points were deducted for causing incidents at the Estadio Oscar Magurno, when Welcome was playing its match against Sayago, on matchday 5 of the Fase Campeonato.)	20	9	11	1637	1684	−47	16	Relegation to DTA (Note: After several incidents involving its fans, Atenas left the tournament, leaving it with one of the relegation spots.)

Source: FUBB
Rules for classification: 1) Win–loss record; 2) Head–to–head record; 3) Head–to–head point difference; 4) Point difference; 5) Points scored; 6) Sum of quotients of points scored

=== Results ===
Home \ Away	ATE	CPT	LGA	OLI	SAY	TAB	UUN	WEL
Atenas		75–90	94–60	81–102				0–20 (Note: Atenas left the tournament after the first five matchdays.)
Capitol			65–75		79–81	91–74		
Larrañaga					83–80	85–74	79–108	53–78
Olimpia		86–73	92–77			75–83		
Sayago	97–80			99–77			81–88	
Tabaré	20–0				97–77		82–79	
Urunday Universitario	103–99	87–68		87–82				99–69
Welcome		82–69		76–91	85–63	85–78		

Source: FUBB
Legend: Blue = home team win; Red = away team win.

== Fase Descenso ==
The Fase Descenso (Relegation Phase) gave one place to the play-in and four to the relegation play-out. The clubs played each other once, with the home team determined by draw. The teams accumulated their points to that obtained in the Torneo Classificatorio.

=== League table ===
Pos	Team	Pld	W	L	PF	PA	PD	Pts	Qualification
1	Unión Atlética	22	13	9	1746	1658	+88	35	Qualification to Play-in
2	Stockolmo	22	10	12	1728	1700	+28	32 (Note: Stockolmo 3 pts., Colón 3 pts. (Stockolmo 1–0 Colón); 25 de Agosto 2 pts.)	
3	Colón (Note: Colón was deducted 1 point for insulting an opposing player in their match, on matchday 2, against Olivol Mundial.)	22	11	11	1623	1566	+57	32	
4	25 de Agosto	21	11	10	1601	1546	+55	32	
5	Olivol Mundial	22	8	14	1658	1748	−90	30	Qualification to Relegation play-out
6	Lagomar	22	7	15	1614	1781	−167	29 (Note: Lagomar 1–0 Verdirrojo)	Qualification to Relegation play-out
7	Verdirrojo	22	7	15	1494	1708	−214	29	Qualification to Relegation play-out
8	Miramar	21	4	17	1497	1736	−239	25	Qualification to Relegation play-out

Updated to match(es) played on unknown. Source: FUBB
Rules for classification: 1) Win–loss record; 2) Head–to–head record; 3) Head–to–head point difference; 4) Point difference; 5) Points scored; 6) Sum of quotients of points scored

=== Results ===
Home \ Away	25A	COL	LAG	MIR	OMU	STO	UAT	VER
25 de Agosto		0–20 (Note: Not having the chance to reach a play-in position, due to the non-appearance of its classic rival, Miramar, against Unión Atlética, 25 de Agosto also decided forfeit.)			88–72	77–70		
Colón			56–64	85–75			54–68	94–51
Lagomar	77–91				63–47	73–92	88–90	
Miramar	80–91		68–58		88–96			
Olivol Mundial		71–87				84–67		71–81
Stockolmo		80–53		93–69			78–60	82–84
Unión Atlética	69–76			20–0 (Note: With no chance of getting out of last place, Miramar decided to forfeit.)	100–73			72–70
Verdirrojo	60–92		72–78	76–92				

Source: FUBB
Legend: Blue = home team win; Red = away team win.

== Relegation play-out ==
With Atenas relegated by forfeit, there was only one more relegation in play. The losers of the semi-finals played a series to determine it.

Semi-finals
13	Olivol Mundial	74	81	2
16	Miramar	72	60	0
14	Lagomar	100	78	69	1
15	Verdirrojo	67	89	73	2

Final
16	Miramar	85	62	73	1
14	Lagomar	76	87	80	2

Source: FUBB

== Play-offs ==
The winner of this phase was promoted. The second promotion was decided between the loser of the final and the winner of the promotion play-off qualifier, which was played by the losers of the semi-finals.

In the quarter-finals, the highest ranked teams gained a point advantage.

Play-in
8	Atenas
9	Unión Atlética	w/o

Quarterfinals
1	Urunday Universitario	82	2
9	Unión Atlética	48	0
4	Tabaré	77	86	2
5	Larrañaga	78	67	1
2	Olimpia	104	2
7	Capitol	78	0
3	Welcome	69	79	2
5	Sayago	78	55	1

Semi-finals
1	Urunday Universitario	82	91	89	2
4	Tabaré	90	64	64	1
2	Olimpia	68	76	86	2
3	Welcome	66	77	58	1

Final
1	Urunday Universitario	79	62	81	2
2	Olimpia	65	69	72	1
Promotion play-off qualifier
4	Tabaré	79
3	Welcome	87

Source: FUBB

=== Second promotion play-off ===
9 October 2024
20:15 UTC−3

Report

Olimpia	85–70	Welcome
Scoring by quarter: 29–17, 28–17, 12–17, 16–19
Pts: Three players 17; Rebs: Glenn 13; Asts: Fernández 8		Pts: Peña 16; Rebs: Nicoletti 13; Asts: Three players 4

Estadio Romeo Schinca, Montevideo
Referees: Alejandro Sanchez Varela, Gonzalo Salgueiro, Vivian Garcia

12 October 2024
20:15 UTC−3

Report

Welcome	74–66	Olimpia
Scoring by quarter: 20–19, 19–9, 21–23, 14–15
Pts: Wohlwend 18; Rebs: Peña 8 Asts: Wohlwend 5		Pts: Viana 19; Rebs: Glenn 15; Asts: Fernández 5

Estadio Romeo Schinca, Montevideo
Referees: Andrés Laulhe, Julio Dutra, Valentina Dorrego

14 October 2024
21:15 UTC−3

Report

Olimpia	69–88	Welcome
Scoring by quarter: 13–23, 29–19, 13–23, 14–23
Pts: Glenn, Fernández 17; Rebs: Glenn 12; Asts: Three players 3		Pts: Verrone 21; Rebs: Peña 7 Asts: Three players 3

Estadio Romeo Schinca, Montevideo
Referees: Gonzalo Salgueiro, Julio Dutra, Aline García

== Final standings ==
Pos	Team	Pld	W	L	Seed	Promotion or relegation
Champion
1	Urunday Universitario	29	23	6	3	Promotion to LUB
Second promotion play-off winner
2	Welcome	31	19	12	3	Promotion to LUB
Second promotion play-off loser
3	Olimpia	32	20	12	2	
Promotion play-off qualifier loser
4	Tabaré	28	16	12	4	
Eliminated in quarter-finals
5	Larrañaga	24	13	11	5	
6	Sayago	24	13	11	6	
7	Capitol	23	11	12	7	
8	Unión Atlética	24	14	11	9	
Eliminated at play-in
9	Atenas	21	10	11	8	Relegation to DTA
Eliminated at Fase Descenso
10	Stockolmo	22	10	12	10	
11	Colón	22	11	11	11	
12	25 de Agosto	21	11	10	12	
Relegation play-out semi-finals winners
13	Olivol Mundial	24	10	14	13	
14	Verdirrojo	25	9	16	15	
Relegation play-out finals winner
15	Lagomar	28	10	18	14	
Relegation play-out finals loser
15	Miramar	26	5	21	16	Relegated to DTA

== Statistical leaders ==
=== Points ===
Pos	Player	Club	PPG
1	(Uruguay) Theo Metzger	Larrañaga	25.0
2	(United States) Tirrel Brown	25 de Agosto	23.9
3	(United States) King Revolution	Sayago	23.3
4	(United States) Desmond Holloway	25 de Agosto	20.8
5	(Uruguay) Agustín Zuvich	Atenas	20.4

=== Rebounds ===
Pos	Player	Club	RPG
1	(Colombia) Santiago Serna	Olivol Mundial	13.0
2	(United States) Deion McClenton	Unión Atlética	12.8
3	(Nigeria) Karachi Edo	Capitol	12.3
4	(Venezuela) Carlos Milano	Lagomar	12.0
5	(Uruguay) Agustín Zuvich	Atenas	11.9

=== Assists ===
Pos	Player	Club	APG
1	(Uruguay) Facundo Terra	Stockolmo	7.6
2	(Uruguay) Luciano Planells	Atenas	6.4
3	(United States) Jacob Ledoux	Capitol	5.9
4	(United States) Robert Whitfield	Verdirrojo	5.7
5	(Uruguay) Diego García	Urunday U.	5.5

=== Blocks ===
Pos	Player	Club	BPG
1	(Uruguay) Theo Metzger	Larrañaga	2.0
2	(United States) Charles Mitchell	Urunday U.	1.9
3	(Uruguay) Lucas Silva	Olivol Mundial	1.6
4	(Argentina) Damián Tintorelli	Sayago	1.5
5	(United States) Tyrone Lee	Urunday U.	1.4

Source: FUBB

== Awards ==
All official awards of the 2023 El Metro.

=== Season MVP ===
Pos.	Player	Team
SF	(Uruguay) Demian Álvarez	Urunday Universitario

=== Foreign season MVP ===
Pos.	Player	Team
C	(Colombia) Álvaro Peña	Welcome

=== Best coach ===
Coach	Team
(Uruguay) Diego Rivas	Welcome
