= Sebastián Vázquez =

Sebastián Vázquez may refer to:

- Sebastián Vázquez (basketball) (born 1985), Uruguayan basketball player
- Sebastián Vázquez (football) (born 1980), Uruguayan football player
- Sebastián Vázquez (golfer) (born 1990), Mexican golfer
