= Ricardo Glenn =

American basketball player (born 1990)

No. 4 – Comunicaciones
- Position: Center
- League: Liga Nacional de Básquetbol

Personal information
- Born: May 1, 1990 (age 36) Detroit, Michigan
- Listed height: 6 ft 8 in (2.03 m)
- Listed weight: 246 lb (112 kg)

Career information
- College: USC Upstate (2010–2014)
- NBA draft: 2014: undrafted
- Playing career: 2014–present

Career history
- 2014–2015: Hoverla
- 2015: MAFC
- 2015–2016: Landstede Zwolle
- 2016–2017: Club Biguá
- 2017: Peñarol
- 2017–2018: Club Biguá
- 2018: Gimnasia y Esgrima
- 2018: Unión Atlética
- 2018–2019: Club Atlético Aguada
- 2019–2020: Capitol Montevideo
- 2020: Ciclista Olímpico
- 2021: Larre Borges
- 2021: Caribbean Storm Islands
- 2022: Kipina
- 2022: Club Atlético Tabaré
- 2022–2023: Larre Borges
- 2023: Brillantes del Zulia
- 2023: Club Atlético Olimpia
- 2024–present: Comunicaciones Mercedes

Career highlights
- Hungarian League rebounding leader (2015); Second Team All-Atlantic Sun (2014)

Ricardo Glenn (born May 1, 1990) is an American basketball player. Glenn plays the center position, and currently plays for Ciclista Olímpico in Argentina.

== Professional career ==
In his debut season in Europe, he played with Hoverla Ivano-Frankivsk in Ukraine first, where he averaged 12.0 points per game. In 2015, he left for MAFC in Hungary. Here, he was the leading rebounder of the 2014–15 Hungarian League.

In October 2015, he signed with Landstede Basketbal in the Netherlands.

In August 2016, Glenn signed with Club Biguá in Uruguay.

== Playing style ==
Glenn is known as a "strong player", with "good rebounding capabilities".
