= Sebastián Vázquez (basketball) =

Uruguayan basketball player

No. 13 – 25 de Agosto
- Position: Small forward
- League: Liga Uruguaya de Basketball

Personal information
- Born: September 4, 1985 (age 41) Montevideo, Uruguay
- Listed height: 6 ft 5 in (1.96 m)

Career information
- Playing career: 2003–present

Career history
- 2014–2018: Goes Montevideo
- 2018: Ciclista Olímpico
- 2018–2021: Nacional
- 2021–present: 25 de Agosto

Sebastián "El Pelado" Vázquez Bernal (born September 4, 1985) is an Uruguayan professional basketball player. He currently plays for the Club Nacional de Football (basketball) club of the Liga Uruguaya de Basketball.

He represented Uruguay's national basketball team at the 2017 FIBA AmeriCup.
