= Emiliano Serres =

Uruguayan basketball player

No. 10 – Peñarol
- Position: Small forward / Power forward
- League: Liga Uruguaya de Basquetbol

Personal information
- Born: 7 June 1997 (age 29) Montevideo, Uruguay
- Listed height: 2.06 m (6 ft 9 in)
- Listed weight: 214 lb (97 kg)

Career information
- Playing career: 2016–present

Career history
- 2016–2019: Club Malvín
- 2019–2023: Obras Sanitarias
- 2024-present: Peñarol

Emiliano Serres (born 7 June 1997 in Montevideo, Uruguay) is a professional Uruguayan basketball forward renowned for his positional versatility, and efficient scoring. He currently plays for Obras Sanitarias in Argentina's top league.

== Club career ==
Serres started at Club Malvín, featuring in the 2016 and 2019 editions of the FIBA Americas League.

In May 2019, he moved to Buenos Aires to join Obras Sanitarias, debuting with 12 points off the bench in a development league game. He gradually became a fixture in the senior rotation.

Described as “a reliable shooter” and standing at 2.04 m, Serres adeptly alternated between small forward and power forward roles under coach Gregorio Martínez.

He briefly played for Peñarol in 2023, where he said: “Since I was a child, I dreamed of playing for Peñarol.”, emphasizing the emotional significance of returning home.

Returning to Obras, he featured prominently in the Basketball Champions League Americas, averaging:

- 2021: 8.5 PPG, 2 RPG
- 2022: 8.5 PPG, 10.5 RPG
- 2023: 10.6 PPG, 6.2 RPG

== International career ==
Serres is a presence on the Uruguay national team. In a 2024 interview, he said “I'm enjoying my moment.” after pivotal wins in AmeriCup qualifiers.

He also praised a commanding victory over Panama: “Ball sharing, teamwork, and defensive security were key.…”
