= Montevideo BBC =

Montevideo Basket-Ball Club
- Leagues: FUBB
- Founded: 1933; 93 years ago
- History: Montevideo BBC (1933–present)
- Location: Montevideo, Uruguay
- President: Facundo Escobar
- Website: www.montevideobbc.uy
Home	Away

The Montevideo Basket Ball Club, commonly known as Montevideo BBC or simply Montevideo, is a Uruguayan basketball team that plays in the Uruguayan Basketball Federation (FUBB). The club was founded in December 1933 in the La Comercial neighborhood of Montevideo, where the head office is still located.

== History ==
A group of basketball fans formed the Montevideo Basket Ball Club in 1933, and named it in honor of the city of Montevideo. The first gym was located between the streets of Martin Garcia and Republica in Montevideo.

The team has moved up and down the division scale, and currently plays in the metropolitano (second division) of the league's three divisions.

== Titles ==
- 1945 Champion Federal 2nd Division
- 1954 Champion winter tournament 1st Division
- 1963 Champion Federal 2nd Division
- 1986 Champion Federal 3rd Division
- 2008 Champion 3rd Division
- 2009 Champion Metropolitan 2nd Division
