= Club Trouville =

Uruguayan sports club

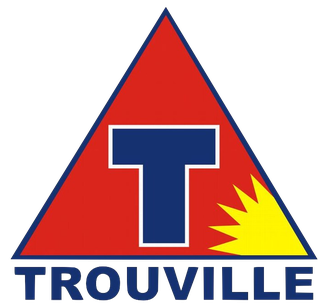
- League: LUB
- Founded: 1922
- History: Club Trouville; 1922–present
- Arena: Pocitos
- Capacity: 776
- Location: Montevideo, Uruguay
- Team colors: red, white
- President: Álvaro Rodríguez
- Head coach: Germán Fernández
- Championships: 1 Federal (1945); 1 LUB (2006)
Home	Away

Club Trouville is a multi-sport club based in Montevideo, Uruguay. The club is mainly known for its professional basketball section, which plays in the Liga Uruguaya de Básquetbol, the first level of Uruguayan basketball. Other sports practiced are rugby union and association football.

== History ==
The club has uncertain origins: its foundation date of April 1, 1922 was established during a meeting among club associates in 1954 after internal research. It owns its name to Plaza Trouville, a square in the Pocitos neighbourhood of Montevideo. The club was affiliated to the Uruguayan Basketball Federation in 1928, and was first promoted to the top level in 1931; in 1945 the team won the Federal championship. After the creation of the Liga Uruguaya de Básquetbol in 2003, the team has played in the league in all of its seasons, winning the league title in 2006, beating Aguada in the final series. Trouville finished second in the 2014–15 LUB, losing to Malvín in the finals. The club has also played at international level, and participated in the Liga Sudamericana de Básquetbol in 2004, 2005, 2008, 2015 and 2016.

The rugby union section has won the Campeonato Uruguayo de Rugby in 1954, 1956 and 1958.

== Notable players ==
Note: Flags indicate national team eligibility at FIBA-sanctioned events. Players may hold other non-FIBA nationalities not displayed.

Criteria

To appear in this section a player must have either:

- Set a club record or won an individual award while at the club
- Played at least one official international match for their national team at any time
- Played at least one official NBA match at any time.

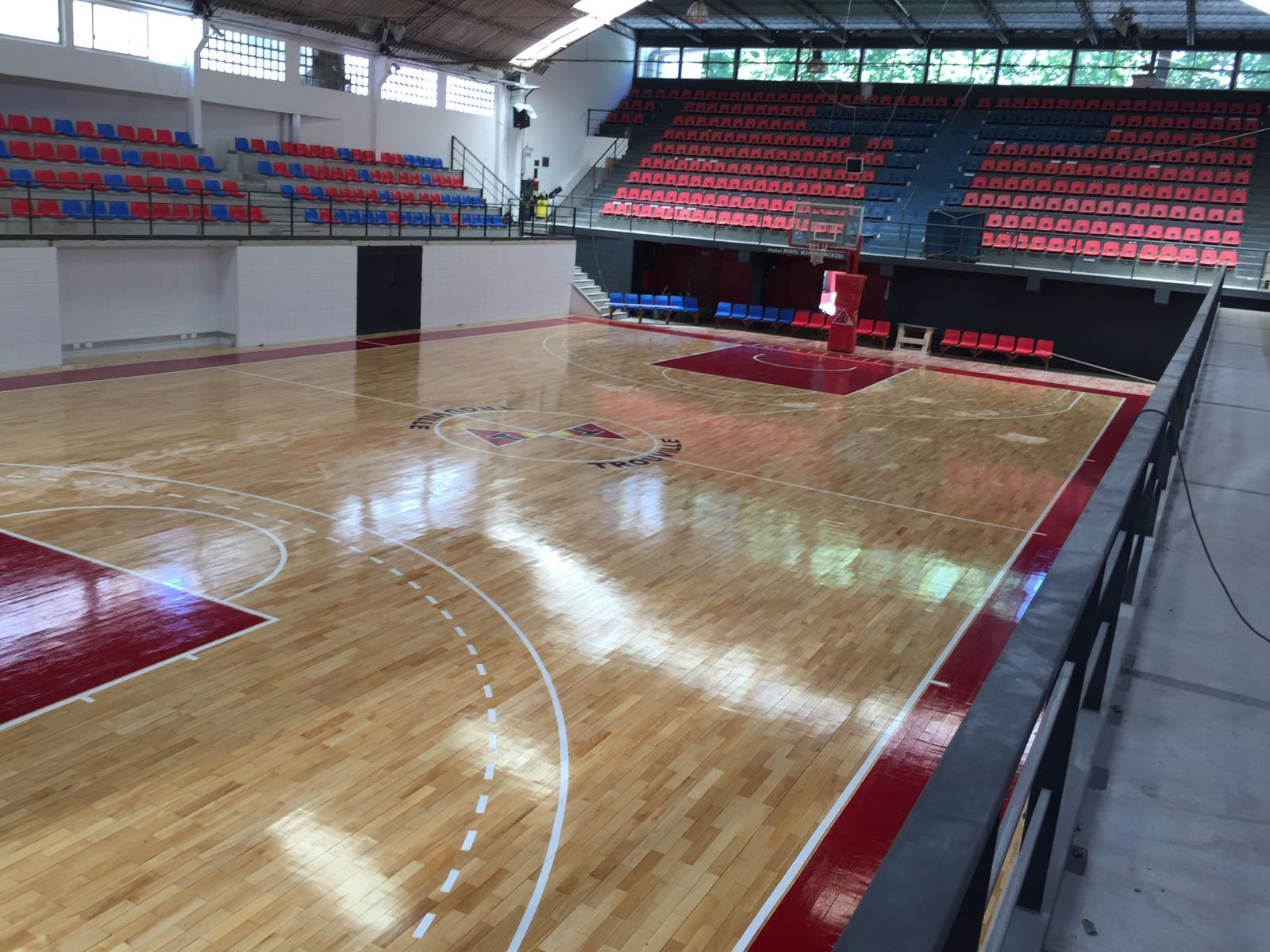
Club Trouville court

- (Uruguay) Gabriel Abratanski
- (Uruguay) Martín Aguilera
- (Uruguay) Esteban Batista
- (Puerto Rico) Miguel "Ali" Berdiel
- (Uruguay) Nicolás Borsellino
- (Uruguay) Marcel Bouzout
- (Uruguay) Hernando Cáceres
- (Uruguay) Claudio Charquero
- (Venezuela) Néstor Colmenares
- (Uruguay) Juan Ducasse
- (United States) J. R. Giddens
- (Uruguay) Sebastián Izaguirre
- (Uruguay) Joaquín Izuibejeres
- (Uruguay) Pablo Morales
- (Uruguay) Reque Newsome
- (Uruguay) Luis Pierri
- (Argentina) Paolo Quinteros
- (Uruguay) Juliano Rivera
- (Colombia) Romário Roque
- (Uruguay) Sebastián Shaw
- (Uruguay) Juan Pablo Silveira
- (Uruguay) Emilio Taboada
- (Uruguay) Santiago Vidal
- (Uruguay) Gonzalo Soto
