= Club Atlético Goes =

Club Atlético Guedes
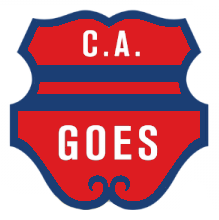
- Leagues: Liga Uruguaya de Basketball
- Founded: 1934
- Arena: Estadio Plaza de las Misiones (4,420 seats)
- Location: Montevideo, Uruguay
- Website: Official website
Home	Away

Club Atlético Goes is a Uruguayan professional basketball team located in Montevideo, Uruguay. The team competes in the Liga Uruguaya de Basketball.

== Current roster ==
Note: Flags indicate national team eligibility at FIBA-sanctioned events. Players may hold other non-FIBA nationalities not displayed.

Club Atlético Goes roster
Players
Coaches

Pos.	No.	Nat.	Name
PF	5	(Uruguay)	Joaquin Borrallo
	6	(Uruguay)	Alvaro Midaglia
F	8	(Uruguay)	Christian Pereira
G	10	(Uruguay)	Alejandro Acosta
	11	(Uruguay)	Joaquin Castro
	12	(Uruguay)	Augustine Dellepiane
PG	13	(Uruguay)	Sebastián Vázquez
C	15	(Uruguay)	Claudio Charquero
G	21	(Uruguay)	Brian Garcia
G	22	(Uruguay)	Santiago Wohlwend
	24	(Uruguay)	Cristian Alcieri
PF	25	(United States)	Clarence Matthews
F	33	(United States)	Calvin Warner
G	44	(Uruguay)	Fernando Martinez

Head coach

(Uruguay) Daniel Lovera

Legend

- (C) Team captain
- Injured

- Roster
Updated: 31 August 2017

== Notable players ==
To appear in this section a player must have either:

- Set a club record or won an individual award as a professional player.
- Played at least one official international match for his senior national team at any time.

- (Uruguay) Fernando Martinez
- (Uruguay) Sebastián Vázquez
- (The Bahamas) David Nesbitt
- (United States) Calvin Warner
