= Urunday Universitario =

- Nickname: El estudioso La doble U (The Double-U); Fusionado; El verde (The green)
- Leagues: Uruguay Metropolitan League
- Founded: August 16, 1931; 94 years ago
- History: Club Atlético Urunday (1932–1946); Club Universitario del Uruguay (1946–present)
- Arena: Gimnasio Cr. Osvaldo Dohir
- Capacity: 700
- Location: Montevideo, Uruguay
- President: Cr. Osvaldo Dohir Mazzoli
- Head coach: Héctor Da Pra
- Website: http://www.urundayuniversitario.com/
Home	Away

Club Social y Deportivo Urunday Universitario is an Uruguayan sports club located in the Prado barrio of Montevideo. Its name comes from Astronium balansae. Its main sports include basketball, and their team currently plays in the Uruguay Metropolitan League.

== History ==
It is the result of the union Club Atlético Urunday (Urunday Athletic Club) and Club Universitario del Uruguay (University Club of Uruguay) in 1978. In 1934, the team joined the Liga Universitaria de Deportes (League of University Sports), where to this day campaigning in the divisional A. In 1946, the team joined the Uruguayan Basketball Federation (FUBB).

== Current roster ==
Note: Flags indicate national team eligibility at FIBA-sanctioned events. Players may hold other non-FIBA nationalities not displayed.

Urunday Universitario roster
Players
Coaches

Pos.	No.	Nat.	Name	Ht.	Age
F	0	(United States)	Fuller, Aaron	1.98 m (6 ft 6 in)	36 – 3 December 1989
SG	1	(United States)	Branch, Stephaun	1.96 m (6 ft 5 in)	30 – 7 November 1995
F/C	5	(Uruguay)	Hornos, Felipe	2.01 m (6 ft 7 in)	23 – 14 December 2002
SF	6	(Uruguay)	Brause, Rodrigo	1.94 m (6 ft 4 in)	30 – 10 July 1995
G/F	7	(United States)	Efianayi, Tanksley	1.98 m (6 ft 6 in)	31 – 6 July 1994
PG	8	(Uruguay)	Corbisiero, Giovanni	1.80 m (5 ft 11 in)	23 – 23 April 2002
F	9	(Uruguay)	Catala, Nicolas	1.96 m (6 ft 5 in)	34 – 23 May 1991
PF	13	(Uruguay)	Delgado, D'Nicolas	1.98 m (6 ft 6 in)	39 – 4 April 1987
G	14	(Uruguay)	Trelles, Martin	1.87 m (6 ft 2 in)	30 – 24 January 1996
C	15	(Uruguay)	Passos, Hatila	2.11 m (6 ft 11 in)	41 – 18 January 1985
PG	20	(Uruguay)	Morena, Ignacio	1.83 m (6 ft 0 in)	26 – 28 January 2000
G	21	(Uruguay)	Curadossi, Bruno	1.88 m (6 ft 2 in)	21 – 30 October 2004
C	22	(Nigeria)	Ibekwe, Ekene	2.06 m (6 ft 9 in)	40 – 19 July 1985
F/C	24	(United States)	Naylor, Cameron	2.02 m (6 ft 8 in)	32 – 3 April 1994
PG	25	(Uruguay)	Agarbado, Abel	1.79 m (5 ft 10 in)	33 – 8 February 1993

Head coach

- (Uruguay) Hector Da Pra

Assistant coach(es)

- (Uruguay) Mauricio Gonzalez
- (Uruguay) Diego Oliveira

Legend

- (C) Team captain
- Injured

- Roster
Updated: 1 February 2023
