= Club Atlético Tabaré =

- League: Torneo Metropolitano
Home	Away

Club Atlético Tabaré (or simply Tabaré) is a professional basketball club based in Montevideo, Uruguay. The club was founded on July 9, 1931 and joined the FUBB in 1932. In 1934 it was promoted to the Second Division and in 1948, the First Division. The club won the Campeonato Uruguayo Federal de Básquetbol federal championship in 1960, 1961, 1962, 1964 and 1968. The club later alternated between the Second and First Division, with its last promotion and title in 2011, returning to decline in the 2013/14 season. It has since played in the Torneo Metropolitano, Uruguay's second division.

== Titles & achievements ==
=== Domestic competitions ===
Uruguayan League

- Winners (5): 1960, 1961, 1962, 1964, 1968

=== American competitions ===
South American Club Championship

- Runners-up (1): 1965

== Notable players ==
To appear in this section a player must have either:

- Set a club record or won an individual award as a professional player.
- Played at least one official international match for his senior national team at any time.

- (Uruguay) Demian Alvarez
- (Uruguay) Federico Alvarez
- (Uruguay) Nicolas Alvarez
- (Cuba) William Granda
