= Edson Bispo dos Santos =

Brazilian basketball player and coach

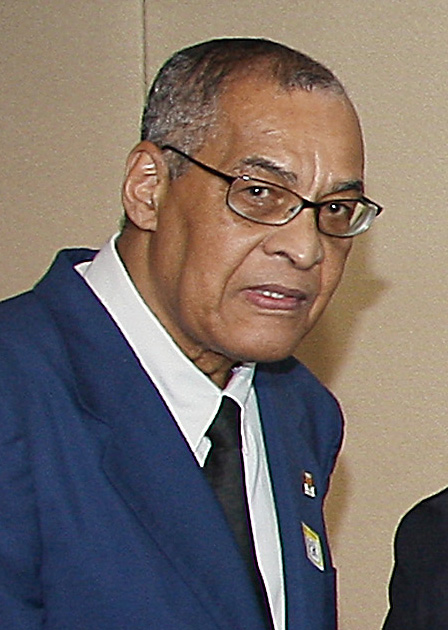
- Dos Santos, in 2009.

Personal information
- Born: 27 May 1935 Rio de Janeiro, Brazil
- Died: 12 February 2011 (aged 75) São Paulo, Brazil
- Listed height: 6 ft 6 in (1.98 m)
- Listed weight: 190 lb (86 kg)
- Position: Power forward / center
Medals
Men's basketball
Representing Brazil
Summer Olympics
Bronze medal – third place	1960 Rome
Bronze medal – third place	1964 Tokyo
FIBA World Cup
Gold medal – first place	1959 Santiago

Edson Bispo dos Santos, also commonly known as Edson Bispo (27 May 1935 – 12 February 2011), was a Brazilian professional basketball player and coach.

== National team playing career ==
With the senior Brazilian national basketball team, Dos Santos won bronze medals at the 1960 Summer Olympic Games, and the 1964 Summer Olympic Games. He also won a gold medal at the 1959 FIBA World Cup. In addition, he won bronze medals at the 1955 Pan American Games and the 1959 Pan American Games, and a silver medal at the 1963 Pan American Games.

== National team coaching career ==
Dos Santos was the head coach of the senior Brazilian national basketball team. He coached Brazil at the 1974 FIBA World Cup, and at the Pan American Games of 1967, 1971, and 1975. He also won a gold medal at the 1971 Pan American Games, and a bronze medal at the 1975 Pan American Games.

He also won a gold medal at the 1973 FIBA South American Championship, and a silver medal at the 1976 FIBA South American Championship.
