= Basketball at the Goodwill Games =

- Status: Inactive
- Frequency: Quadrennially
- Inaugurated: 1986
- Most recent: 2001
- Organizer: Goodwill Games

Basketball at the Goodwill Games began at the inaugural edition in Moscow, Soviet Union for women only. The men competition began at the 1990 edition in Seattle, United States.

== Men's tournament ==
=== Summaries ===
Year	Hosts	Gold medal game			Bronze medal game		
Year	Hosts	Gold	Score	Silver	Bronze	Score	Fourth place
1990	(United States); Seattle	Yugoslavia	85–79	United States	Soviet Union	109–103	Brazil
1994	(Russia); Saint Petersburg	Puerto Rico	94–80	Italy	United States	80–71	Russia
1998	(United States); New York City	United States	119–75	Australia	Lithuania	93–85	Puerto Rico
2001	(Australia); Brisbane	United States	91–63	Argentina	Brazil	94–93	Australia

=== Medal table ===
Rank	Nation	Gold	Silver	Bronze	Total
1	United States	2	1	1	4
2	Puerto Rico	1	0	0	1
2	Yugoslavia	1	0	0	1
4	Argentina	0	1	0	1
4	Australia	0	1	0	1
4	Italy	0	1	0	1
7	Brazil	0	0	1	1
7	Lithuania	0	0	1	1
7	Soviet Union	0	0	1	1
Totals (9 entries)		4	4	4	12

Goodwill Games
Years	Hosts	Gold	Silver	Bronze	4th place
1990; Details	(United States); Seattle, USA	Yugoslavia	United States	Soviet Union	Brazil
1994; Details	Saint Petersburg, Russia	Puerto Rico	Italy	United States	Russia
1998; Details	(United States); New York City, USA	United States	Australia	Lithuania	Puerto Rico
2001; Details	Brisbane, Australia	United States	Argentina	Brazil	Australia

=== Top scorers ===
==== Points Per Game ====
Year	Player	Position	Team	Points Per Game
1990	Oscar Schmidt	F	Brazil	
1998	Eddie Casiano	SG	Puerto Rico	24.7

==== Final ====
Year	Player	Position	Team	Points
1990	Billy Owens	F	United States	23
1994	Jerome Mincy	SG	Puerto Rico	20
1998	Shane Heal	SG	Australia	38
2001	Jermaine O'Neal	F	United States	14

== Women's tournament ==
Pan American Games
Years	Hosts	Gold	Silver	Bronze	4th place
1986; Details	(Soviet Union); Moscow, USSR	United States	Soviet Union	Brazil	Bulgaria
1990; Details	(United States); Seattle, USA	United States	Soviet Union	Bulgaria	Brazil
1994; Details	Saint Petersburg, Russia	United States	France	China	Russia

== See also ==
- Basketball at the Mediterranean Games
- Basketball at the Summer Olympics
- Basketball at the Summer Universiade
- Basketball at the Pan American Games
