= Basketball at the Pan American Games =

- No. of events: 2 (men: 1; women: 1)

Basketball at the Pan American Games began at the inaugural edition in Buenos Aires, Argentina for men only. The women competition began at the 1959 edition in Chicago, United States, and was not held in 1995 edition in Mar del Plata due to the lack of participating teams.

== Men's tournament ==
Pan American Games
Years	Hosts	Gold	Silver	Bronze	4th place
1951; Details	Buenos Aires, Argentina	United States	Argentina	Brazil	Cuba
1955; Details	Mexico City, Mexico	United States	Argentina	Brazil	Mexico
1959; Details	Chicago, United States	United States	Puerto Rico	Brazil	Mexico
1963; Details	São Paulo, Brazil	United States	Brazil	Puerto Rico	Uruguay
1967; Details	Winnipeg, Canada	United States	Mexico	Panama	Cuba
1971; Details	Cali, Colombia	Brazil	Puerto Rico	Cuba	Mexico
1975; Details	Mexico City, Mexico	United States	Puerto Rico	Brazil	Mexico
1979; Details	San Juan, Puerto Rico	United States	Puerto Rico	Brazil	Cuba
1983; Details	Caracas, Venezuela	United States	Brazil	Mexico	Canada
1987; Details	Indianapolis, United States	Brazil	United States	Puerto Rico	Mexico
1991; Details	Havana, Cuba	Puerto Rico	Mexico	United States	Cuba
1995; Details	Mar del Plata, Argentina	Argentina	United States	Brazil	Uruguay
1999; Details	Winnipeg, Canada	Brazil	United States	Puerto Rico	Argentina
2003; Details	Santo Domingo, Dominican Republic	Brazil	Dominican Republic	Puerto Rico	United States
2007; Details	Rio de Janeiro, Brazil	Brazil	Puerto Rico	Uruguay	Argentina
2011; Details	Guadalajara, Mexico	Puerto Rico	Mexico	United States	Dominican Republic
2015; Details	Toronto, Canada	Brazil	Canada	United States	Dominican Republic
2019; Details	Lima, Peru	Argentina	Puerto Rico	United States	Dominican Republic
2023; Details	Santiago, Chile	Argentina	Venezuela	Brazil	Mexico

=== Medal table ===
Rank	Nation	Gold	Silver	Bronze	Total
1	United States	8	3	4	15
2	Brazil	6	2	7	15
3	Argentina	3	2	0	5
4	Puerto Rico	2	6	4	12
5	Mexico	0	3	1	4
6	Canada	0	1	0	1
6	Dominican Republic	0	1	0	1
6	Venezuela	0	1	0	1
9	Cuba	0	0	1	1
9	Panama	0	0	1	1
9	Uruguay	0	0	1	1
Totals (11 entries)		19	19	19	57

=== Participation details ===
Team	1951	1955	1959	1963	1967	1971	1975	1979	1983	1987	1991	1995	1999	2003	2007	2011	2015	2019	2023	Total
Argentina	2nd place, silver medalist(s)	2nd place, silver medalist(s)	–	–	6th	5th	7th	6th	5th	9th	7th	1st place, gold medalist(s)	4th	6th	4th	7th	5th	1st place, gold medalist(s)	1st place, gold medalist(s)	17
Bahamas	–	–	–	–	–	–	9th	–	–	–	9th	–	–	–	–	–	–	–	–	2
Brazil	3rd place, bronze medalist(s)	3rd place, bronze medalist(s)	3rd place, bronze medalist(s)	2nd place, silver medalist(s)	7th	1st place, gold medalist(s)	3rd place, bronze medalist(s)	3rd place, bronze medalist(s)	2nd place, silver medalist(s)	1st place, gold medalist(s)	5th	3rd place, bronze medalist(s)	1st place, gold medalist(s)	1st place, gold medalist(s)	1st place, gold medalist(s)	5th	1st place, gold medalist(s)	–	3rd place, bronze medalist(s)	18
Canada	–	–	5th	6th	9th	8th	6th	5th	4th	5th	10th	–	5th	7th	7th	6th	2nd place, silver medalist(s)	–	–	14
Chile	5th	–	–	–	–	–	–	–	–	–	–	–	–	–	–	–	–	–	5th	2
Colombia	10th	–	–	–	10th	10th	–	–	–	–	–	–	–	–	–	–	–	–	–	3
Cuba	4th	5th	6th	–	4th	3rd place, bronze medalist(s)	5th	4th	7th	–	4th	–	7th	–	–	–	–	–	–	10
Dominican Republic	–	–	–	–	–	–	–	9th	9th	–	–	–	6th	2nd place, silver medalist(s)	–	4th	4th	4th	6th	8
Ecuador	9th	–	–	–	–	–	–	–	–	–	–	–	–	–	–	–	–	–	–	1
El Salvador	–	–	7th	–	–	–	–	–	–	–	–	–	–	–	–	–	–	–	–	1
Haiti	–	–	–	–	–	12th	–	–	–	–	–	–	–	–	–	–	–	–	–	1
Mexico	8th	4th	4th	7th	2nd place, silver medalist(s)	4th	4th	8th	3rd place, bronze medalist(s)	4th	2nd place, silver medalist(s)	5th	–	5th	–	2nd place, silver medalist(s)	8th	7th	4th	17
Panama	6th	–	–	–	3rd place, bronze medalist(s)	6th	–	7th	–	6th	–	–	–	–	6th	–	–	–	8th	7
Paraguay	7th	–	–	–	–	–	–	–	–	–	–	–	–	–	–	–	–	–	–	1
Peru	–	–	–	5th	8th	9th	–	–	–	–	–	–	–	–	–	–	–	–	–	3
Puerto Rico	–	–	2nd place, silver medalist(s)	3rd place, bronze medalist(s)	5th	2nd place, silver medalist(s)	2nd place, silver medalist(s)	2nd place, silver medalist(s)	6th	3rd place, bronze medalist(s)	1st place, gold medalist(s)	6th	3rd place, bronze medalist(s)	3rd place, bronze medalist(s)	2nd place, silver medalist(s)	1st place, gold medalist(s)	6th	2nd place, silver medalist(s)	7th	17
Suriname	–	–	–	–	–	13th	–	–	–	–	–	–	–	–	–	–	–	–	–	1
United States	1st place, gold medalist(s)	1st place, gold medalist(s)	1st place, gold medalist(s)	1st place, gold medalist(s)	1st place, gold medalist(s)	7th	1st place, gold medalist(s)	1st place, gold medalist(s)	1st place, gold medalist(s)	2nd place, silver medalist(s)	3rd place, bronze medalist(s)	2nd place, silver medalist(s)	2nd place, silver medalist(s)	4th	5th	3rd place, bronze medalist(s)	3rd place, bronze medalist(s)	3rd place, bronze medalist(s)	–	18
Uruguay	–	–	–	4th	–	–	–	–	–	7th	8th	4th	8th	8th	3rd place, bronze medalist(s)	8th	–	6th	–	9
Venezuela	–	6th	–	–	–	–	8th	–	8th	8th	6th	–	–	–	–	–	7th	5th	2nd place, silver medalist(s)	8
Virgin Islands	–	–	–	–	–	11th	10th	10th	–	10th	–	–	–	–	8th	–	–	8th	–	6
Nations	10	6	7	7	10	13	10	10	9	10	10	6	8	8	8	8	8	8	8	

=== Top scorers ===
==== By total points ====
Year	Player	Position	Team	Total points
1987	Oscar Schmidt	SF	Brazil	246
1991	Leonardo Perez	SG	Cuba	150
1995	Juan Espil	SG/SF	Argentina	143
1999				
2003	Nicolás Mazzarino	SG	Uruguay	91
2007	Esteban Batista	C	Uruguay	91
2011	Jack Michael Martínez	C	Dominican Republic	106
2015	Vítor Benite; Andrew Nicholson	SG	Brazil; Canada	91
2019	Gabriel Deck	SG	Argentina	94
2023	Garly Sojo	SG	Venezuela	79

==== By points per game ====
Year	Player	Position	Team	PPG
2003	Nicolás Mazzarino	SG	Uruguay	18.2
2007	Esteban Batista	C	Uruguay	18.2
2011	Jack Michael Martínez	SF	Dominican Republic	21.2
2015	Vítor Benite; Andrew Nicholson	SG	Brazil; Canada	18.2
2019	Walter Hodge	SG	Virgin Islands	22.0
2023	Garly Sojo	SG	Venezuela	19.8

==== Final - topscorer ====
Year	Player	Position	Team	Points
1995	Juan Espil	SG/SF	Argentina	22
1999				
2003	Guilherme Giovannoni	SG	Brazil	20
2007	J. P. Batista	C	Brazil	20
2011	Renaldo Balkman	F	Puerto Rico	28
2015	Anthony Bennett	SG	Canada	18
2019	Luis Scola	C	Argentina	28
2023	Garly Sojo; Bautista Lugarini	SG; SG	Venezuela; Argentina	17

== Women's tournament ==
Pan American Games
Years	Hosts	Gold	Silver	Bronze	4th place
1955; Details	Mexico City, Mexico	United States	Chile	Brazil	Mexico
1959; Details	Chicago, United States	United States	Brazil	Chile	Canada
1963; Details	São Paulo, Brazil	United States	Brazil	Chile	Canada
1967; Details	Winnipeg, Canada	Brazil	United States	Canada	Mexico
1971; Details	Cali, Colombia	Brazil	United States	Cuba	Mexico
1975; Details	Mexico City, Mexico	United States	Mexico	Cuba	Brazil
1979; Details	San Juan, Puerto Rico	Cuba	United States	Canada	Brazil
1983; Details	Caracas, Venezuela	United States	Cuba	Brazil	Canada
1987; Details	Indianapolis, United States	United States	Brazil	Canada	Cuba
1991; Details	Havana, Cuba	Brazil	Cuba	United States	Canada
1995	Tournament not held				
1999; Details	Winnipeg, Canada	Cuba	Canada	United States	Brazil
2003; Details	Santo Domingo, Dominican Republic	Cuba	United States	Brazil	Canada
2007; Details	Rio de Janeiro, Brazil	United States	Brazil	Cuba	Canada
2011; Details	Guadalajara, Mexico	Puerto Rico	Mexico	Brazil	Colombia
2015; Details	Toronto, Canada	Canada	United States	Cuba	Brazil
2019; Details	Lima, Peru	Brazil	United States	Puerto Rico	Colombia
2023; Details	Santiago, Chile	Brazil	Colombia	Argentina	Cuba

=== Medal table ===
Rank	Nation	Gold	Silver	Bronze	Total
1	United States	7	6	2	15
2	Brazil	5	4	4	13
3	Cuba	3	2	4	9
4	Canada	1	1	3	5
5	Puerto Rico	1	0	1	2
6	Mexico	0	2	0	2
7	Chile	0	1	2	3
8	Colombia	0	1	0	1
9	Argentina	0	0	1	1
Totals (9 entries)		17	17	17	51

=== Participation details ===
Team	(Mexico); 1955	(United States); 1959	(Brazil); 1963	(Canada); 1967	(Colombia); 1971	(Mexico); 1975	(Puerto Rico); 1979	(Venezuela); 1983	(United States); 1987	(Cuba); 1991	(Canada); 1999	(Dominican Republic); 2003	(Brazil); 2007	(Mexico); 2011	(Canada); 2015	(Peru); 2019	(Chile); 2023	Total
Argentina	-	-	-	-	-	-	-	-	-	5th	5th	5th	6th	5th	5th	5th	3rd	8
Bolivia	-	-	-	-	-	-	7th	-	-	-	-	-	-	-	-	-	-	1
Brazil	3rd	2nd	2nd	1st	1st	4th	4th	3rd	2nd	1st	4th	3rd	2nd	3rd	4th	1st	1st	17
Canada	5th	4th	4th	3rd	5th	5th	3rd	4th	3rd	4th	2nd	4th	4th	6th	1st	6th	-	16
Chile	2nd	3rd	3rd	-	-	-	-	-	-	-	-	-	-	-	-	-	6th	4
Colombia	-	-	-	-	7th	6th	-	-	7th	-	-	-	5th	4th	-	4th	2nd	7
Cuba	-	-	-	5th	3rd	3rd	1st	2nd	4th	2nd	1st	1st	3rd	-	3rd	-	4th	12
Dominican Republic	-	-	-	-	-	7th	-	-	-	-	6th	6th	-	-	8th	-	-	4
Ecuador	-	-	-	-	6th	-	-	-	-	-	-	-	-	-	-	-	-	1
El Salvador	-	-	-	-	-	8th	-	-	-	-	-	-	-	-	-	-	-	1
Jamaica	-	-	-	-	-	-	-	-	-	-	-	-	8th	8th	-	-	-	2
Mexico	4th	5th	-	4th	4th	2nd	5th	-	5th	-	-	-	7th	2nd	-	-	8th	10
Paraguay	-	-	-	-	-	-	-	-	-	-	-	-	-	-	-	7th	-	1
Peru	-	-	-	-	-	-	-	-	6th	-	-	-	-	-	-	-	-	1
Puerto Rico	-	-	-	-	-	-	6th	6th	-	-	-	-	-	1st	6th	3rd	7th	6
United States	1st	1st	1st	2nd	2nd	1st	2nd	1st	1st	3rd	3rd	2nd	1st	7th	2nd	2nd	-	16
Venezuela	-	-	-	-	-	-	-	5th	-	-	-	-	-	-	7th	-	5th	3
Virgin Islands	-	-	-	-	-	-	-	-	-	-	-	-	-	-	-	8th	-	1
Nations	5	5	4	5	7	7	8	6	8	8	7	6	8	8	8	8	8	

== 3x3 basketball ==
=== Men's tournament ===
Pan American Games
Years	Hosts	Gold	Silver	Bronze	4th place
2019; Details	Lima, Peru	United States	Puerto Rico	Dominican Republic	Brazil
2023; Details	Santiago, Chile	United States	Chile	Trinidad and Tobago	Venezuela

=== Women's tournament ===
Pan American Games
Years	Hosts	Gold	Silver	Bronze	4th place
2019; Details	Lima, Peru	United States	Argentina	Dominican Republic	Brazil
2023; Details	Santiago, Chile	United States	Colombia	Chile	Puerto Rico

=== Medal table ===
Rank	Nation	Gold	Silver	Bronze	Total
1	United States	4	0	0	4
2	Chile	0	1	1	2
3	Argentina	0	1	0	1
3	Colombia	0	1	0	1
3	Puerto Rico	0	1	0	1
6	Dominican Republic	0	0	2	2
7	Trinidad and Tobago	0	0	1	1
Totals (7 entries)		4	4	4	12

== See also ==
- Basketball at the Mediterranean Games
- Basketball at the Summer Olympics
- Basketball at the Summer Universiade
- Basketball at the Goodwill Games
