= Basketball at the 2023 Pan American Games – Men's tournament =

Men's basketball at the 2023 Pan American Games

Tournament details
- Host country: Chile
- City: Santiago
- Dates: October 31 – November 4, 2023
- Teams: 8 (from 1 confederation)
- Venue: 1 (in 1 host city)

Final positions
- Champions: Argentina (3rd title)
- Runners-up: Venezuela
- Third place: Brazil
- Fourth place: Mexico

Tournament statistics
- Top scorer: (Venezuela) Garly Sojo

The men's basketball tournament at the 2023 Pan American Games was held in Santiago, Chile at the Multisport Complex 1 at the National Stadium Park cluster, from October 31 to November 4, 2023. The eight participating teams were divided into two groups of four teams each, with the top two advancing to the knockout stage.

Argentina were the defending Pan American Games gold medalists, and they successfully defended their medal.

== Qualified teams ==
Eight teams qualified for the tournament. The top seven teams at the 2022 FIBA AmeriCup joined host team Chile to complete the eight berths. However, the United States and Canada, the teams that ended the AmeriCup in third and fourth, respectively, decided not to participate. They were replaced by the Dominican Republic and Panama.

Event	Dates	Location	Quota(s)	Qualified
Host nation	—	—	1	Chile
2022 FIBA AmeriCup	September 2–11	(Brazil) Recife	7	Argentina; Brazil; ~~United States~~; ~~Canada~~; Mexico; Puerto Rico; Venezuela; Dominican Republic; Panama
Total			8	

== Draw ==
The draw was held in Santiago, Chile, on September 22, 2023.

Pot 1	Pot 2	Pot 3	Pot 4
Argentina; Brazil	Venezuela; Puerto Rico	Dominican Republic; Mexico	Panama; Chile

== Rosters ==
The eight participating teams must name a roster up to 12 players each.

- Argentina (12)
- Brazil (12)
- Chile (12)
- Dominican Republic (12)
- Mexico (12)
- Panama (12)
- Puerto Rico (12)
- Venezuela (12)

== Competition format ==
In the first round of the competition, teams are divided into two pools of four teams, and play follows a round robin format with each of the teams playing all other teams in the pool once. Teams are awarded two points for a win, and one point for a loss.

Following the completion of the pool games, the top two teams from each pool advance to a single elimination round consisting of two semifinal games, and the bronze and gold medal matches. Losing teams compete in classification matches to determine their ranking in the tournament.

== Preliminary round ==
All times are local (UTC−3).

=== Group A ===
Pos	Team	Pld	W	L	PF	PA	PD	Pts	Qualification
1	Argentina	3	3	0	262	246	+16	6	Semifinals
2	Venezuela	3	2	1	257	253	+4	5	Semifinals
3	Dominican Republic	3	1	2	252	227	+25	4	Fifth place game
4	Panama	3	0	3	198	243	−45	3	Seventh place game

Source: Santiago 2023

31 October 2023
10:30

Boxscore

Argentina	95–88 (OT)	Venezuela
Scoring by quarter: 24–19, 22–11, 17–17, 14–30, Overtime: 18–11
Pts: Scala 23; Rebs: Saiz 10; Asts: Scala 6		Pts: Sojo 22; Rebs: Graterol 10; Asts: Mijares 6

Multisport Complex 1, Santiago
Referees: Jorge Vásquez (PUR), Johnny Batista (PUR), Alan dos Santos (BRA)

31 October 2023
13:00

Boxscore

Dominican Republic	81–53	Panama
Scoring by quarter: 17–10, 13–24, 28–8, 23–11
Pts: Guerrero 16; Rebs: Araújo 8 Asts: Suero 7		Pts: Romero 13; Rebs: Romero 13; Asts: Hall 7

Multisport Complex 1, Santiago
Referees: Luis Vásquez (PUR), Krishna Domínguez (MEX), Carmelo de la Rosa (PUR)

1 November 2023
10:30

Boxscore

Panama	77–85	Argentina
Scoring by quarter: 15–22, 17–21, 28–25, 17–17
Pts: Sánchez 21; Rebs: Romero 8 Asts: Hall 5		Pts: Cuello 23; Rebs: Ramírez 8 Asts: Baralle, Cuello 5

Multisport Complex 1, Santiago
Referees: Johnny Batista (PUR), Felipe Ibarra (CHI), Fernando Cavalcante (BRA)

1 November 2023
13:00

Boxscore

Venezuela	92–90 (OT)	Dominican Republic
Scoring by quarter: 18–19, 14–19, 30–29, 19–17, Overtime: 11–9
Pts: Colmenares, Sojo 21; Rebs: Sojo 10; Asts: Pirela, Sojo 4		Pts: Pérez 22; Rebs: Guerrero 8 Asts: Dicent, Suero 3

Multisport Complex 1, Santiago
Referees: Luis Vásquez (PUR), Alan dos Santos (BRA), Kevin Lei (CAN)

2 November 2023
10:30

Boxscore

Argentina	82–81 (OT)	Dominican Republic
Scoring by quarter: 19–4, 23–25, 15–24, 17–21, Overtime: 8–7
Pts: Saiz 19; Rebs: Lugarini 9 Asts: Baralle, Scala 6		Pts: Solano 30; Rebs: Guerrero 14; Asts: Suero 4

Multisport Complex 1, Santiago
Referees: Johnny Batista (PUR), Kristian Páez (ECU), Alan dos Santos (BRA)

2 November 2023
13:00

Boxscore

Panama	68–77	Venezuela
Scoring by quarter: 12–16, 29–23, 16–21, 11–17
Pts: Sánchez 23; Rebs: Romero 13; Asts: Hall 4		Pts: Sojo 22; Rebs: Colmenares 18; Asts: Ascanio, Sifontes 3

Multisport Complex 1, Santiago
Referees: Krishna Domínguez (MEX), Carmelo de la Rosa (PUR), Fernando Cavalcante (BRA)

=== Group B ===
Pos	Team	Pld	W	L	PF	PA	PD	Pts	Qualification
1	Brazil	3	3	0	240	166	+74	6	Semifinals
2	Mexico	3	1	2	195	209	−14	4 (Note: Head to head record: Mexico 1−1 (+6), Chile 1−1 (0), Puerto Rico 1−1 (−6))	Semifinals
3	Chile (H)	3	1	2	172	223	−51	4	Fifth place game
4	Puerto Rico	3	1	2	211	220	−9	4	Seventh place game

Source: Santiago 2023
(H) Hosts
Notes:

31 October 2023
17:30

Boxscore

Mexico	54–74	Brazil
Scoring by quarter: 10–19, 13–23, 13–18, 18–14
Pts: Valdés, Jaimes 9 Rebs: Camacho 5 Asts: Andriassi 3		Pts: Crepaldi 14; Rebs: Louzada, Crepaldi 6 Asts: Corazza 4

Multisport Complex 1, Santiago
Referees: Gastón Maina (URU), Daniel Nieves (VEN), Kevin Lei (CAN)

31 October 2023
20:00

Boxscore

Chile	66–70	Puerto Rico
Scoring by quarter: 18–14, 24–17, 15–20, 9–19
Pts: Carvacho 16; Rebs: Carvacho 11; Asts: Morales 6		Pts: Vaughn 14; Rebs: four players 5 Asts: Ortiz 5

Multisport Complex 1, Santiago
Referees: Julio Anaya (PAN), Michael Scott (CAN), Franco Anselmo (ARG)

1 November 2023
17:30

Boxscore

Puerto Rico	72–82	Mexico
Scoring by quarter: 12–25, 24–20, 21–13, 15–24
Pts: Cruz 23; Rebs: Medina 7 Asts: Boyd 5		Pts: Montano 24; Rebs: Ávalos 8 Asts: Ávalos 5

Multisport Complex 1, Santiago
Referees: Leonardo Zalazar (ARG), Kristian Páez (ECU), Michael Scott (CAN)

1 November 2023
20:00

Boxscore

Brazil	94–43	Chile
Scoring by quarter: 33–7, 20–8, 21–10, 20–18
Pts: Dias 21; Rebs: Crepaldi 7 Asts: Corazza 6		Pts: Jones 9 Rebs: Carrión 4 Asts: Morales 5

Multisport Complex 1, Santiago
Referees: Daniel García (VEN), Carlos Vélez (COL), Orlando Varela (HON)

2 November 2023
17:30

Boxscore

Brazil	72–69	Puerto Rico
Scoring by quarter: 19–15, 13–21, 21–17, 19–16
Pts: Dias 17; Rebs: Fuzaro 6 Asts: Corazza 6		Pts: Boyd 18; Rebs: Cintron 9 Asts: three players 3

Multisport Complex 1, Santiago
Referees: Andrés Maina (URU), Carlos Londono (COL), Kevin Lei (CAN)

2 November 2023
20:00

Boxscore

Chile	63–59	Mexico
Scoring by quarter: 14–11, 16–17, 21–22, 12–9
Pts: Carvacho 16; Rebs: Carvacho 12; Asts: Morales 8		Pts: Gutiérrez 19; Rebs: Gutiérrez 13; Asts: de Haro 4

Multisport Complex 1, Santiago
Referees: Michael Scott (CAN), Orlando Varela (HON), Franco Anselmo (ARG)

== Classification games ==
=== Seventh place game ===
3 November 2023
10:30

Boxscore

Panama	49–89	Puerto Rico
Scoring by quarter: 9–21, 8–19, 17–24, 15–25
Pts: Quintero 17; Rebs: Romero 9 Asts: Hall 4		Pts: Ocasio 25; Rebs: Cintron 10; Asts: Cintron 5

Multisport Complex 1, Santiago
Referees: Leonardo Zalazar (ARG), Daniel García (VEN), Franco Anselmo (ARG)

=== Fifth place game ===
3 November 2023
13:00

Boxscore

Dominican Republic	75–83	Chile
Scoring by quarter: 15–29, 19–9, 12–20, 29–25
Pts: Suero 15; Rebs: Solano 7 Asts: three players 4		Pts: Carvacho 24; Rebs: Morales 11; Asts: Morales 12

Multisport Complex 1, Santiago
Referees: Andrés Maina (URU), Krishna Domínguez (MEX), Fernando Cavalcante (BRA)

== Knockout round ==
Semifinals
November 3
Argentina	108
Mexico	73
November 3
Brazil	77
Venezuela	84

Gold medal game
November 4
Argentina	79
Venezuela	65
Bronze medal game
November 4
Mexico	61
Brazil	73

=== Semifinals ===
3 November 2023
17:30

Boxscore

Argentina	108–73	Mexico
Scoring by quarter: 25–26, 32–13, 26–24, 25–10
Pts: Baralle 13; Rebs: Ramírez 8 Asts: Baralle, Scala 5		Pts: Andriassi 15; Rebs: de Haro 5 Asts: Machado 4

Multisport Complex 1, Santiago
Referees: Jorge Vásquez (PUR), Julio Anaya (PAN), Kevin Lei (CAN)

3 November 2023
20:00

Boxscore

Brazil	77–84	Venezuela
Scoring by quarter: 15–25, 22–31, 20–14, 20–14
Pts: Pereira 22; Rebs: Crepaldi 10; Asts: Corazza 8		Pts: Sifontes 22; Rebs: Colmenares, Sojo 7 Asts: Pirela 6

Multisport Complex 1, Santiago
Referees: Luis Vásquez (PUR), Michael Scott (CAN), Carmelo de la Rosa (PUR)

=== Bronze medal game ===
4 November 2023
17:00

Boxscore

Mexico	61–73	Brazil
Scoring by quarter: 10–21, 13–18, 17–17, 21–17
Pts: Montano 16; Rebs: Jaimes 8 Asts: Montano 4		Pts: Camilo 18; Rebs: Crepaldi 10; Asts: Dias 5

Multisport Complex 1, Santiago
Referees: Jorge Vásquez (PUR), Leonardo Zalazar (ARG), Johnny Batista (PUR)

=== Gold medal game ===
4 November 2023
20:00

Boxscore

Argentina	79–65	Venezuela
Scoring by quarter: 17–12, 26–22, 27–10, 9–21
Pts: Lugarini 17; Rebs: Saiz 10; Asts: Cuello 4		Pts: Sojo 17; Rebs: Colmenares 10; Asts: Sifontes 3

Multisport Complex 1, Santiago
Referees: Luis Vásquez (PUR), Julio Anaya (PAN), Andrés Bartel (URU)

== Awards ==
=== Topscorer ===
- (Venezuela) Garly Sojo 79 pts (19.8 ppg)

2023 Pan American Games winners

Argentina
fourth title

== Final standings ==
Rank	Team	Record
1st place, gold medalist(s)	Argentina	5–0
2nd place, silver medalist(s)	Venezuela	3–2
3rd place, bronze medalist(s)	Brazil	4–1
4	Mexico	1–4
5	Chile	2–2
6	Dominican Republic	1–3
7	Puerto Rico	2–2
8	Panama	0–4
