= Argentina men's national basketball team =

Men's national basketball team representing Argentina

Argentina
- FIBA ranking: 8 (13 July 2026)
- Joined FIBA: 1932 (co-founders)
- FIBA zone: FIBA Americas
- National federation: CAB
- Coach: Pablo Prigioni
- Nickname: El Alma Argentina (The Argentine Soul)

Olympic Games
- Appearances: 9
- Medals: Gold: (2004); Bronze: (2008)

FIBA World Cup
- Appearances: 14
- Medals: Gold: (1950); Silver: (2002, 2019)

FIBA AmeriCup
- Appearances: 20
- Medals: Gold: (2001, 2011, 2022); Silver: (1995, 2003, 2005, 2007, 2015, 2017, 2025); Bronze: (1980, 1993, 1999, 2009, 2013)

Pan American Games
- Appearances: 17
- Medals: Gold: (1995, 2019, 2023); Silver: (1951, 1955)
- Retired numbers: 2 (5 , 13)
Home	Away

First international
- 1921 v. Uruguay
Medal record
Olympic Games
Gold medal – first place	2004 Athens	Team
Bronze medal – third place	2008 Beijing	Team
FIBA World Cup
Gold medal – first place	1950 Argentina
Silver medal – second place	2002 United States
Silver medal – second place	2019 China
FIBA AmeriCup
Gold medal – first place	2001 Argentina
Gold medal – first place	2011 Argentina
Gold medal – first place	2022 Brazil
Silver medal – second place	1995 Argentina
Silver medal – second place	2003 Puerto Rico
Silver medal – second place	2005 Dominican Republic
Silver medal – second place	2007 United States
Silver medal – second place	2015 Mexico
Silver medal – second place	2017 Argentina/Colombia/Uruguay
Silver medal – second place	2025 Nicaragua
Bronze medal – third place	1980 Puerto Rico
Bronze medal – third place	1993 Puerto Rico
Bronze medal – third place	1999 Puerto Rico
Bronze medal – third place	2009 Puerto Rico
Bronze medal – third place	2013 Venezuela
FIBA Diamond Ball
Gold medal – first place	2008 Nanjing
Bronze medal – third place	2004 Belgrade

The Argentina men's national basketball team (Spanish: selección de básquetbol (Note: The word básquetbol is specific to Rioplatense Spanish, the standard Spanish dialect of Argentina. In most other forms of Spanish, this word would be baloncesto.) de Argentina) represents Argentina in men's international basketball officially nicknamed The Argentine Soul (Spanish: El Alma Argentina), and it is controlled by the Argentine Basketball Confederation (CAB).

Argentina's national basketball team remains among the most successful in the Americas and one of the most successful in the world. It is the only national team in the FIBA Americas zone that has won the quintuplet crown: FIBA World Cup (they won the first edition, in 1950), Olympic Gold Medal (2004, considered the highest honor and most important title in the history of the Argentine men's team), FIBA Diamond Ball (2008), FIBA AmeriCup (2001, 2011 and 2022) and Pan American Gold Medal (1995, 2019 and 2023). They are also one of only four countries to have won the Olympic gold medal and FIBA World Cup joining the Soviet Union, the United States of America, and Yugoslavia. They have also won 13 South American Basketball Championships, as well as many youth championships.

The Argentine representative were also the first country to defeat a United States national team with a full squad of NBA players. They did so by 87–80 in the 2002 FIBA World Championship held in Indianapolis. In that tournament, Argentina came second behind FR Yugoslavia, losing the final in overtime.

Due to the series of good results since the beginning of the 2000s, Argentina reached the first position in the FIBA Men's Ranking at the end of the 2008 Olympic Games. Argentina is a founding member of the International Federation of Basketball (FIBA) and has South America's longest basketball tradition.

== History ==
The practice of basketball in Argentina was started by Asociación Cristiana de Jóvenes (Young Men's Christian Association – YMCA) in 1912, with the first Federation (Federación Argentina) established to organise competitions not only in Buenos Aires but in several cities around Argentina.

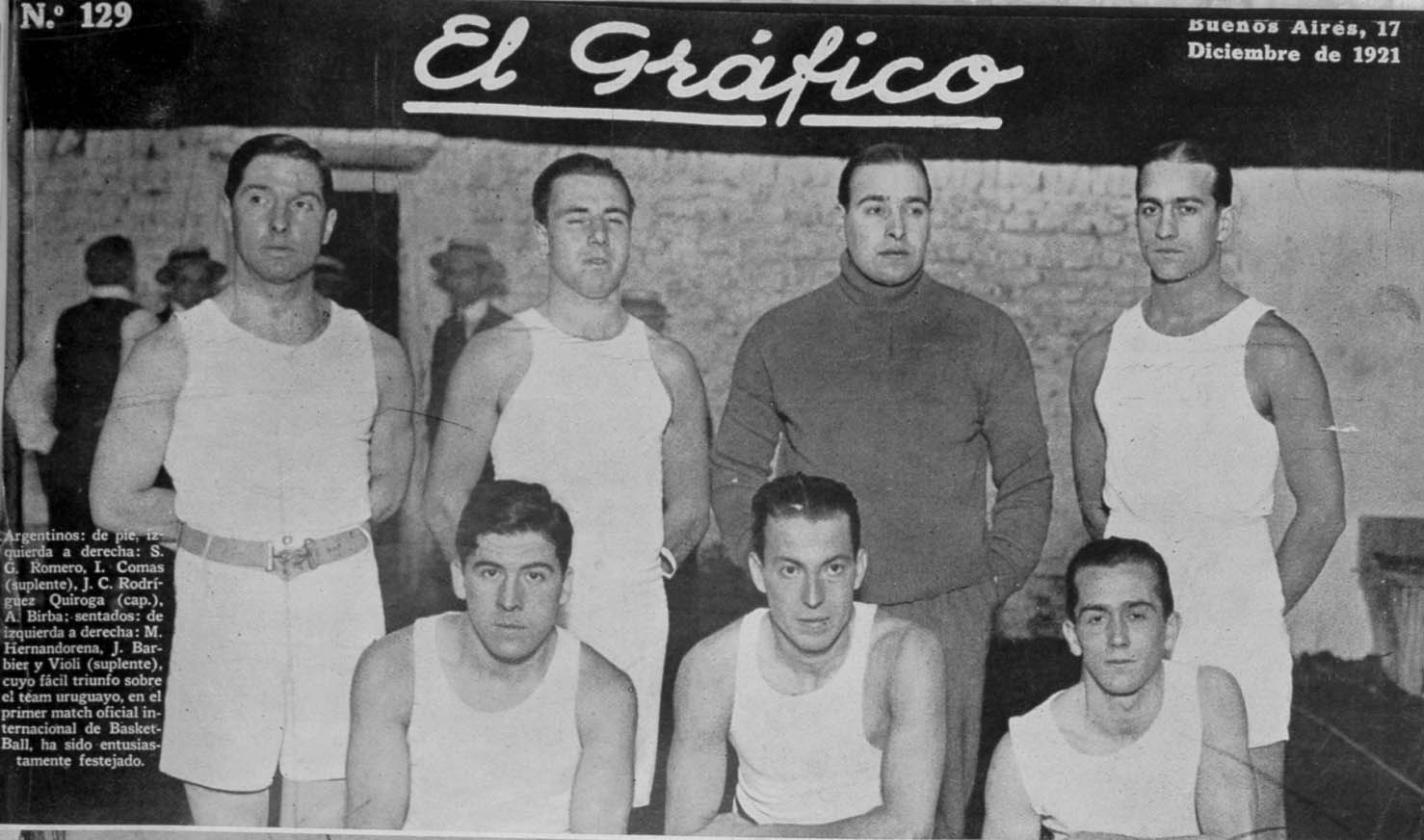
The first national team as covered by El Gráfico magazine in 1921

Argentina played its first international game against Uruguay in 1921.

In 1950 Argentina won its first and only World Championship to date, with a squad formed entirely of amateur players, after defeating France (twice), Brazil, Chile, Egypt and the United States in the decisive match.

With the creation of the Liga Nacional de Básquet in the mid-1980s, a new generation of players led Argentina to a moderate success in the 1986 World Championship where the squad defeated United States for the first time.

2001 was the year when the Golden Generation, winning Argentina's first FIBA Americas Championship – held in Neuquen – where they defeated all of their rivals in the competition. The progress of Argentine basketball would be shown in the 2002 FIBA World Championship, where they became the first team to defeat a United States roster composed entirely of NBA players and also reached the final, finally losing to Yugoslavia. Argentina would reach the finals for the first time since the first World Championship in 1950, but the most important achievement for the squad came in the 2004 Olympic Games in Athens when Argentina won their first gold medal, including another victory over the United States at the semi-finals. The Olympics title in 2004 was the highest honor and most important title won in Argentine basketball history.

== Uniforms and suppliers ==
Period	Kit manufacturer
1970s–1997	(Argentina) Topper
1998–2001	(Germany) Adidas
2002–2007	(Argentina) Topper
2007–2013	(China) Li-Ning
2014–2017	(Italy) Kappa
2017–2020	(United States) Jordan
2022–2025	(Spain) Kelme
2025–present	(China) Peak

Since its establishment, the Argentina national team had worn white kits. The team had a long tenure wearing Topper, which was the official supplier since the 1970s to 2007. In 2002, two light blue horizontal stripes (similar to the National flag) were added to the jerseys. When the contract with Topper expired in 2007, the CABB signed an agreement with Chinese firm Li-Ning, which kept the design established by Topper.

Italian company Kappa was the uniforms supplier since 2013. In 2014 the company designed a vertical striped model in the style of football and field hockey representatives. The jersey debuted in the 2014 FIBA Basketball World Cup.

When Nike became official sponsor through its brand Air Jordan, the Argentina jersey returned to a simple white color scheme. The deal extended to 2020, when the American company ceased operations in Argentina.

From 2022 to 2025, Spanish brand Kelme was the kit provider for all Argentinian basketball teams.

In August 2025, the Association announced a new deal signed with Chinese company Peak to provide all the uniforms for the national team. The agreement will be into force until 2032, and includes supplying for all the basketball team, including women's and youth teams. Uniforms manufactured by Peak debuted at the 2025 FIBA AmeriCup.

== Honours ==
- Olympic Games
  - Gold (1): 2004
  - Bronze (1): 2008
- FIBA World Cup
  - Gold (1): 1950
  - Silver (2): 2002, 2019
- FIBA Diamond Ball
  - Gold (1): 2008
  - Bronze (1): 2004
- FIBA Stanković Continental Champions' Cup
  - Gold (1): 2013 (2)
  - Silver (3): 2005, 2013 (1), 2016
- FIBA AmeriCup
  - Gold (3): 2001, 2011, 2022
  - Silver (7): 1995, 2003, 2005, 2007, 2015, 2017, 2025
  - Bronze (5): 1980, 1993, 1999, 2009, 2013
- Pan American Games
  - Gold (3): 1995, 2019, 2023
  - Silver (2): 1951, 1955
- South American Championship
  - Gold (13): 1934, 1935, 1941, 1942, 1943, 1966, 1976, 1979, 1987, 2001, 2004, 2008, 2012
  - Silver (12): 1930, 1938, 1940, 1973, 1983, 1989, 1993, 1995, 1999, 2003, 2010, 2014
  - Bronze (13): 1932, 1939, 1945, 1960, 1961, 1969, 1971, 1977, 1981, 1985, 1991, 1997, 2006

== Competition results ==
=== Olympic Games ===
Summer Olympic Games Record
Year	Position	Pld	W	L
(Germany) 1936	Did Not Qualify			
(United Kingdom) 1948	15th place	8	4	4
(Finland) 1952	4th place	8	5	3
(Australia) 1956	Did Not Qualify			
(Italy) 1960	Did Not Qualify			
(Japan) 1964	Did Not Qualify			
(Mexico) 1968	Did Not Qualify			
(Germany) 1972	Did Not Qualify			
(Canada) 1976	Did Not Qualify			
(Soviet Union) 1980	Originally qualified, but later withdrew			
(United States) 1984	Did Not Qualify			
(South Korea) 1988	Did Not Qualify			
(Spain) 1992	Did Not Qualify			
(United States) 1996	9th place	7	4	3
(Australia) 2000	Did Not Qualify			
(Greece) 2004	Gold Medal	8	6	2
(China) 2008	Bronze Medal	8	6	2
(United Kingdom) 2012	4th place	8	4	4
(Brazil) 2016	8th place	6	3	3
(Japan) 2020	7th place	4	1	3
(France) 2024	Did Not Qualify			
Total		57	33	24

=== FIBA World Cup ===
FIBA World Cup Record
Year	Position	Pld	W	L
(Argentina) 1950	Champions	6	6	0
(Brazil) 1954	Did Not Qualify			
(Chile) 1959	10th	6	3	3
(Brazil) 1963	8th	8	4	4
(Uruguay) 1967	6th	9	3	6
(Socialist Federal Republic of Yugoslavia) 1970	Did Not Qualify			
(Puerto Rico) 1974	11th	7	2	5
(Philippines) 1978	Did Not Qualify			
(Colombia) 1982	Did Not Qualify			
(Spain) 1986	12th	10	5	5
(Argentina) 1990	8th	8	2	6
(Canada) 1994	9th	8	5	3
(Greece) 1998	8th	9	3	6
(United States) 2002	Runner-up	9	8	1
(Japan) 2006	4th	9	7	2
(Turkey) 2010	5th	9	7	2
(Spain) 2014	11th	6	3	3
(China) 2019	Runner-up	8	7	1
(Philippines) (Japan) (Indonesia) 2023	Did Not Qualify			
(Qatar) 2027	To be determined			
(France) 2031	To be determined			
Total		112	65	47

=== FIBA Diamond Ball ===
FIBA Diamond Ball Record
Year	Position	Pld	W	L
(Hong Kong) 2000	Did Not Qualify			
(Serbia and Montenegro) 2004	Bronze Medal	3	2	1
(China) 2008	Champions	3	3	0
Total		6	5	1

=== FIBA AmeriCup ===
FIBA AmeriCup Record
Year	Position	Pld	W	L
(Puerto Rico) 1980	Third place	6	4	2
(Brazil) 1984	7th	8	2	6
(Uruguay) 1988	5th	6	3	3
(Mexico) 1989	8th	8	2	6
(United States) 1992	6th	5	2	3
(Puerto Rico) 1993	Third place	7	5	2
(Argentina) 1995	Runner-up	10	8	2
(Uruguay) 1997	4th	9	4	5
(Puerto Rico) 1999	Third place	10	7	3
(Argentina) 2001	Champions	10	10	0
(Puerto Rico) 2003	Runner-up	10	6	4
(Dominican Republic) 2005	Runner-up	10	7	3
(United States) 2007	Runner-up	10	8	2
(Puerto Rico) 2009	Third place	10	7	3
(Argentina) 2011	Champions	10	9	1
(Venezuela) 2013	Third place	10	6	4
(Mexico) 2015	Runner-up	10	8	2
(Argentina) (Colombia) (Uruguay) 2017	Runner-up	5	4	1
(Brazil) 2022	Champions	6	6	0
(Nicaragua) 2025	Runner-up	6	4	2
Total		166	112	54

=== South American Championship ===
South American Championship Record
Year	Position	Pld	W	L
(Uruguay) 1930	Runner-up	6	4	2
(Chile) 1932	Third place	4	0	4
(Argentina) 1934	Champions	6	6	0
(Brazil) 1935	Champions	4	3	1
(Chile) 1937	5th	8	2	6
(Peru) 1938	Runner-up	4	3	1
(Brazil) 1939	Third place	4	2	2
(Uruguay) 1940	Runner-up	5	4	1
(Argentina) 1941	Champions	5	5	0
(Chile) 1942	Champions	5	4	1
(Peru) 1943	Champions	8	5	3
(Ecuador) 1945	Third place	5	3	2
(Brazil) 1947	5th	5	2	3
(Paraguay) 1949	5th	5	2	3
(Uruguay) 1953	Did Not Participate			
(Colombia) 1955	4th	5	3	2
(Chile) 1958	4th	7	4	3
(Argentina) 1960	Third place	6	4	2
(Brazil) 1961	Third place	7	5	2
(Peru) 1963	4th	8	5	3
(Argentina) 1966	Champions	7	6	1
(Paraguay) 1968	5th	7	4	3
(Uruguay) 1969	Third place	6	4	2
(Uruguay) 1971	Third place	7	5	2
(Colombia) 1973	Runner-up	7	6	1
(Colombia) 1976	Champions	6	6	0
(Chile) 1977	Third place	8	6	2
(Argentina) 1979	Champions	6	6	0
(Uruguay) 1981	Third place	5	3	2
(Brazil) 1983	Runner-up	5	3	2
(Colombia) 1985	Third place	7	5	2
(Paraguay) 1987	Champions	6	5	1
(Ecuador) 1989	Runner-up	9	7	2
(Venezuela) 1991	Third place	7	6	1
(Brazil) 1993	Runner-up	7	5	2
(Uruguay) 1995	Runner-up	7	3	4
(Venezuela) 1997	Third place	7	4	3
(Argentina) 1999	Runner-up	6	5	1
(Chile) 2001	Champions	9	9	0
(Uruguay) 2003	Runner-up	6	4	2
(Brazil) 2004	Champions	6	5	1
(Venezuela) 2006	Third place	4	3	1
(Chile) 2008	Champions	6	5	1
(Colombia) 2010	Runner-up	5	3	2
(Argentina) 2012	Champions	5	5	0
(Venezuela) 2014	Runner-up	5	4	1
(Venezuela) 2016	4th	6	4	2
Total		270	190	80

=== Pan American Games ===
Pan American Games Record
Year	Position	Pld	W	L
(Argentina) 1951	Silver Medal	6	5	1
(Mexico) 1955	Silver Medal	5	4	1
(United States) 1959	Did Not Participate			
(Brazil) 1963	Did Not Participate			
(Canada) 1967	6th	5	1	4
(Colombia) 1971	5th	9	5	4
(Mexico) 1975	7th	9	3	6
(Puerto Rico) 1979	6th	9	3	6
(Venezuela) 1983	5th	9	4	5
(United States) 1987	9th	5	1	4
(Cuba) 1991	6th	7	3	4
(Argentina) 1995	Gold Medal	7	7	0
(Canada) 1999	4th	5	2	3
(Dominican Republic) 2003	6th	5	2	3
(Brazil) 2007	4th	5	2	3
(Mexico) 2011	7th	4	2	2
(Canada) 2015	5th	4	2	2
(Peru) 2019	Gold medal	5	4	1
(Chile) 2023	Gold medal	5	5	0
(Peru) 2027	To be determined			
(Paraguay) 2031	To be determined			
Total		104	55	49

== Players ==
=== Current roster ===
Roster for the 2025 FIBA AmeriCup.

Argentina men's national basketball team roster
Players
Coaches

Pos.	No.	Name	Age – Date of birth	Height	Club	Ctr.
PF	1	Francisco Cáffaro	25 – 19 May 2000	2.07 m (6 ft 9 in)	Bàsquet Girona	(Spain)
PG	6	Juani Marcos	25 – 6 July 2000	1.90 m (6 ft 3 in)	FC Barcelona	(Spain)
SF	9	Nicolás Brussino	32 – 2 March 1993	2.00 m (6 ft 7 in)	Gran Canaria	(Spain)
G	10	Gonzalo Corbalán	23 – 3 March 2002	1.93 m (6 ft 4 in)	San Pablo Burgos	(Spain)
PG	11	José Vildoza (C)	29 – 15 January 1996	1.91 m (6 ft 3 in)	Boca Juniors	(Argentina)
PG	16	Dylan Bordón	20 – 16 October 2004	1.90 m (6 ft 3 in)	Gran Canaria	(Spain)
C	18	Gonzalo Bressan	23 – 16 November 2001	2.05 m (6 ft 9 in)	Olímpico La Banda	(Argentina)
SF	20	Juan Bocca	20 – 18 March 2005	1.98 m (6 ft 6 in)	Obradoiro CAB	(Spain)
PF	21	Juan Fernández	22 – 21 November 2002	2.05 m (6 ft 9 in)	Bàsquet Girona	(Spain)
SF	22	Juan Pablo Vaulet	29 – 22 March 1996	1.98 m (6 ft 6 in)	Palencia Baloncesto	(Spain)
PF	23	Santiago Trouet	21 – 25 January 2004	2.05 m (6 ft 9 in)	Arizona State Sun Devils	(United States)
SG	44	Alex Negrete	24 – 2 August 2001	1.92 m (6 ft 4 in)	IACC	(Brazil)

Head coach

- (Argentina) Pablo Prigioni

Assistant coach(es)

- (Argentina) Pablo Albertinazzi
- (Argentina) Nicolas Casalanguida
- (Argentina) Pablo Favarel
- (Argentina) Herman Mandole

Legend

- (C) Team captain
- Club – describes last
  club before the tournament
- Age – describes age
  on 22 August 2025

=== Retired numbers ===
In July 2017, the Argentine Basketball Confederation announced that numbers 5 and 13 would be retired since the 2017 edition of FIBA AmeriCup and for the rest of championships played by the senior team from then on.

Argentina retired numbers
No.	Player	Pos.	Tenure	Games	Points	Ref.
5	Emanuel Ginóbili	SG	1998–2016	104	1,588	
13	Andrés Nocioni	SF	1999–2016	121	1,364	

== Head coaches ==
- (Argentina) León Najnudel: (1985)
- (Puerto Rico) Flor Meléndez: (1986–1987)
- (Argentina) Alberto Finger: (1987–1989)
- (Argentina) Carlos Boismené: (1989–1992)
- (Argentina) Walter Garrone: (1992)
- (Argentina) Guillermo Vecchio: (1993–1996)
- (Argentina) Julio Lamas: (1997–1999)
- (Argentina) (Italy) Rubén Magnano: (2000–2004)
- (Argentina) Sergio Hernández: (2005–2010)
- (Argentina) Julio Lamas: (2011–2014)
- (Argentina) Sergio Hernández: (2015–2020)
- (Argentina) Gabriel Picatto: (2020–2021)
- (Argentina) Sergio Hernández: (2021)
- (Argentina) Néstor García: (2021–2022)
- (Argentina) Pablo Prigioni: (2022–present)
