= Puerto Rico men's national basketball team =

Men's national basketball team

Puerto Rico
- FIBA ranking: 17 ▼1 (1 September 2026)
- Joined FIBA: 1957
- FIBA zone: FIBA Americas
- National federation: Puerto Rican Basketball Federation
- Coach: Carlos González
- Nickname(s): 12 Magníficos; Los Gallos

Olympic Games
- Appearances: 10

FIBA World Cup
- Appearances: 15

FIBA AmeriCup
- Appearances: 20
- Medals: (1980, 1989, 1995) (1988, 1993, 1997, 2009, 2013) (2003, 2007)

Pan American Games
- Appearances: 16
- Medals: (gold) (1991, 2011); (silver) (1959, 1971, 1975, 1979, 2007, 2019); (bronze) (1963, 1999, 2003)

Centrobasket
- Appearances: 24
- Medals: (gold) (1973, 1985, 1987, 1989, 1991, 1993, 2001, 2003, 2008, 2010, 2016); (silver) (1965, 1971, 1975, 1977, 1981, 1997, 1999, 2004, 2012, 2014); (bronze) (1969, 1995, 2006)
Home	Away

First international
- Puerto Rico 26–39 Mexico (San Salvador, El Salvador; 1935)

Biggest win
- Puerto Rico 171–72 Belize (Santo Domingo, Dominican Republic; 7 March 1974)
Medal record
Event	1st	2nd	3rd
FIBA Basketball World Cup	0	0	0
FIBA AmeriCup	3	5	2
Centrobasket	11	10	3
Pan American Games	2	6	4
Central American and Caribbean Games	6	6	4
FIBA CBC Championship	1	0	0
Goodwill Games	1	0	0
Total	24	27	13

The Puerto Rico national basketball team (Spanish: Selección de Baloncesto de Puerto Rico) represents Puerto Rico in men's international basketball competitions, it is governed by the Puerto Rican Basketball Federation (Spanish: Federación de Baloncesto de Puerto Rico), The team represents both FIBA and FIBA Americas. The team is colloquially known as the 12 Magníficos (lit. "The Magnificent 12").

Since joining FIBA in 1957, the Puerto Rican national team has been mostly composed by Puerto Rican-born players and players of Puerto Rican descent born in the continental United States such as Raymond Gause, Rick Apodaca, Georgie Torres, Héctor Blondet, Renaldo Balkman, Ramón Clemente, Maurice Harkless, Tyler Davis and many others.

The team's unofficial mascot is Moncho Loubriel.

== History ==
The Puerto Rican Basketball Federation joined FIBA in 1957. Puerto Rico has participated in nine Olympics and 12 World Championships, although they have never won a medal at either competition.

=== Early years ===
Puerto Rico's first appearance at a World Championship was in 1959 in Chile, where, led by Juan Vicéns, who averaged 22 points per game, the team finished 5th with a record of 3–6. In 1963, at Puerto Rico's second World Championship appearance which took place in Brazil, the team, led by Rafael Valle and Juan Vicéns, opened the tournament winning two straight games. Yet, after losing other six games back to back, ended its participation with a win over Italy, obtaining the 6th place.

Coming back from its 13th place debut at the 1960 Olympics in Rome, in 1964 in Tokyo, the team was able to reach 4th place, in good part because of the contributions of point guard Juan Vicéns. This was, and still is as of 2016, the highest place it has ever reached since the team's birth at any Olympic Games. Three years later in Uruguay, at the 1967 World Championship, the team, led this time by Raymond Dalmau, was only able to finish 12th, ending the decade with a 9th place at the 1968 Olympics in Mexico City.

Before the 1970s, regardless of the unremarkable performance at world international tournaments, Puerto Rico started to emerge as a power player at regional tournaments, medaling in all the competitions it participated (the Pan American Games, the CentroBasket tournament and the Central American and Caribbean Games). The medal count included two golds at the 1962 and the 1966 Central American and Caribbean Games, failing to medal only at the 1967 Pan American Games, where it finished 5th.

=== 1970s ===
The 1970s brought some dramatic moments for the team, particularly a one-point loss to the United States at the 1976 Olympics in Montreal, where a win by Puerto Rico would have been the first undisputed basketball loss for the United States team at an Olympic competition. Also, the 1974 World Championship and the 1979 Pan American Games were held in San Juan, promoting local enthusiasm for international basketball and Puerto Rico's presence in it. The 7th and 10th places at the 1974 and 1978 World Championships, where the team, led by Hector Blondet and Rubén Rodríguez respectively, saw 2–5 and 4–3 finishes, became turning points for the Puerto Rican team. The 4–3 showing in 1978 in the Philippines was the first time ever the team finished with a positive record at a World Championship. These achievements were accompanied by golds at the 1973 Centrobasket and the 1978 Central American and Caribbean Games. In all, Puerto Rico continued its regional success and was able to medal in all regional competitions.

=== 1980s ===
The 1980s included significant success for the team, as it earned gold medals at two of the first four FIBA Americas Championships in 1980 and 1989, and at the 1985, 1987 and 1989 CentroBasket tournaments. The silver medal at the 1988 Americas Championship held in Montevideo, Uruguay, secured the team's first Olympic participation since 1976. Having qualified and earned the right to participate, the Puerto Rican team chose not to do so at the 1980 Olympic Games, held in Moscow, in solidarity with the American boycott of that competition, despite possessing the autonomy to attend. It also didn't participate at the 1984 Olympic Games held in Los Angeles, because the team failed to qualify for it. Twelve years after its last Olympic showing, Puerto Rico was able to advance to the second round and finished 7th at the 1988 Olympic Games, held in Seoul. Two years earlier, at the 1986 World Championship in Spain, Puerto Rico's performance granted it the 10th place, having failed to qualify for the 1982 Championship in Colombia.

=== 1990s ===
During the 1990s, the team's success continued. Led by José Ortiz, Ramón Rivas, Jerome Mincy, Fico López, and Edgar León. the decade began with a 4th-place finish at the 1990 World Championship in Argentina. Puerto Rico's best World Championship showing to date, it defeated teams such as eventual gold medallist Yugoslavia, Argentina and the United States, lost to the USSR and advanced to the medal round. The team lost the bronze medal game to the United States by two points in overtime. In 1991, led by Raymond Gause, besides earning gold at the CentroBasket tournament, the team also won, the gold medal for the first time at the Pan American Games in Cuba. The team also qualified for the 1992 Olympics in Barcelona, where it reached the second round, losing to the US in its first game of the elimination round, finishing at the end in 8th place. In 1993, Puerto Rico signed its Caribbean supremacy at this sport by winning gold at both the CentroBasket and the Central American and Caribbean Games. This victory at CentroBasket was the last of a 5 gold medal streak at the tournament. In 1994, the team finished in a 6th place at the World Championship in Canada, but won the gold at the 1994 Goodwill Games in St. Petersburg, Russia, defeating teams such as Croatia, Russia, Brazil and Italy. It was then when Puerto Rico began to be classified as one of the top 10 international teams. Having won gold in 1995 at the FIBA Americas Pre-Olympic Championship, in 1996 at the Olympic Games, the team placed 10th in Atlanta, while in 1998, it placed 11th at the World Championship in Greece.

In 1994, Puerto Rico's national basketball team won the gold medal at the 1994 Goodwill Games in Russia, beating Italy, 94–80, in the gold medal game.

=== 2000–2004 ===
This Olympic cycle did not go well for the team at the International level, although it did have great moments and it performed well at the local level. Having failed to qualify for the 2000 Olympics in Sydney, Australia with its 4th place at the 1999 Tournament of the Americas hosted in San Juan, Puerto Rico, in 2001 the team was able to recover its CentroBasket title, with a triumph in Mexico. Later that year, the team repeated its 4th place at the 2001 FIBA Americas tournament in Argentina.

In 2002, the team had a strong showing at the World Championship held in Indianapolis, USA. The team beat the top 3 European teams at the time; eventual champion Yugoslavia, Turkey and Spain. Puerto Rico, with a 5–1 record entering the quarterfinals, lost its chance to get into the medals round only by a dramatic 2-points loss to New Zealand, eventually placing 7th. It is worth mentioning that Carlos Arroyo debuted at this tournament.

In 2003, the team also won gold at the CentroBasket tournament, held in Mexico, but was only able to achieve the bronze medal at the Tournament of the Americas and the Pan American Games. Reaching its 16th final at the CentroBasket tournament, Puerto Rico conquered the silver medal at the 2004 CentroBasket tournament, losing to the host Dominican Republic, 75–74, in the championship game.

The team made its ninth Olympic appearance in 2004 at Athens. On 15 August 2004, the Puerto Rico National Basketball Team became the second team in history to defeat the United States Olympic basketball team, recording only the third loss in an Olympic competition for the U.S. team, and the first since NBA players were allowed to compete. The 92–73 outcome of that game is, as of 2025, the most lopsided victory against the U.S. (collegiate or NBA players) in the history of Olympic basketball. The other team to defeat the U.S. had been the Soviet Union at the 1972 gold medal game (the outcome of which is still disputed) and the 1988 semifinals. Carlos Arroyo's gesture of lifting his shirt towards the end of the game became the subject of a picture that was published internationally and is considered iconic in Puerto Rico. For academic Antonio Sotomayor, the significance of this victory had to be taken within the context of imperialism in Olympism, being an scenario in which a "twenty-first century colonial nation can dramatically beat its colonial masters at their own game", in the process asserting "world exposure and national existence".

=== 2005–2008 ===
In 2005, Puerto Rico was invited to play at the 2005 Stanković Continental Champions' Cup in Beijing, where it lost all five games and ended up finishing in 6th place. Still, having failed to qualify directly to the 2006 World Championship by achieving a 7th place at the 2005 FIBA Americas Championship in Santo Domingo, due to its great tradition, in November 2005, Puerto Rico received an invitation to participate in the World tournament as a wildcard, along with Italy, Serbia and Montenegro and Turkey. En route to the World Championship, Puerto Rico won bronze at the 2006 Centrobasket, losing the automatic classification to the 2008 tournament, but recovering in time to earn gold at the 2006 Central American and Caribbean Games. Later, at the group play stage of the 2006 World Championship, which was contested in Japan, Puerto Rico started with victories over Senegal and China, but lost ties against the United States, Italy and Slovenia. The application of a second tiebreaker by points differential to Slovenia, China and Puerto Rico, each with a winning percentage of .400, placed Puerto Rico fifth in Group D, preventing the team from advancing to the knockout round for the first time since 1986; Puerto Rico ultimately placed 17th out of twenty-four, that being its shyest performance in a long time. The following year began with Puerto Rico earning its fifth silver medal at the 2007 Pan American Games, followed by the team's first participation in a CaribeBasket tournament, debuting against Trinidad & Tobago. Although the team didn't have the participation of Daniel Santiago or Rick Apodaca, Puerto Rico won the tournament undefeated, which meant its classification to the 2008 Centrobasket tournament. Later that year, Puerto Rico started to host an exhibition tournament called the Marchand Continental Championship Cup in order to prepare for the 2007 FIBA Americas Championship. After playing against Brazil, Canada and Argentina, Puerto Rico lost all three games, ending up in fourth place. The year ended with a bronze at the FIBA Americas Championship. On 31 January 2008, a draw took place for the FIBA Preolympic tournament, which placed Puerto Rico in the same group as Croatia and Cameroon, where its winner would have to face the second place of Group C. Following this event, the president of the National Superior Basketball League confirmed that the team would play exhibition games at the 2008 Bamberg Super Cup in Germany against Greece, Slovenia and the host, beginning on 4 July 2008. Then, a second set of exhibition games would follow, scheduled to start on 8 July 2008, in Slovenia: the 2008 Alpos International Cup, where the team would face New Zealand, Iran and the hosts. After these preparatory tournaments, the team would train until the Preolympic tournament's beginning. The team began practicing on 19 May 2008, and included several players that were under consideration for inclusion by Cintrón. On 4 June 2008, Daniel Santiago confirmed that he would abandon his international retirement and play with Puerto Rico in the Preolympic tournament. Santiago announced that he would join the team in July, following an exhibition game. Javier Mojica, Alejandro Carmona and Joel Jones were included in as potential members in the preliminary team. On 1 July 2008, hours before the team was scheduled to travel to Europe, Ángelo Reyes was excluded after not establishing communication with the directives. Reyes was replaced with Alex Falcón. Subsequently, Reyes asked for a dispensation to attend personal matters, noting that he intended to join the team in a week; however, he was not included due to time constraints. In the first game at the Bamberg Super Cup, Puerto Rico defeated Germany with a team composed mostly of reserve players, as Carlos Arroyo, Santiago, Larry Ayuso and Carmelo Lee were attending other compromises. Puerto Rico continued playing with these players, finishing 2nd, after losing the final game to Greece, who entered the cup with their entire lineup. Santiago and Ayuso joined the practices on 5 July 2008, when Puerto Rico traveled to Slovenia, where the Alpos International Cup was being held. The first match in the tournament was a victory against New Zealand, followed by another victory in the semifinals over Iran. At the end, Puerto Rico finished second, losing to Slovenia in the finals. The Preolympic tournament began on 14 July 2008, but Puerto Rico's debut came the following day, when the team defeated Cameroon and advanced to the second round, due to a loss that the African team had suffered during the first day of competition. On its second game, the team lost to Croatia, but in the quarterfinals, defeated Slovenia. The team didn't qualify to the Olympics, after losing to Greece in the semifinals and to Germany in the tournament's bronze medal game.

=== 2008–2012 ===
This Olympic cycle began with the 2008 Centrobasket competition. After having failed to qualify directly to it, Puerto Rico's spot was secured after its first and only participation in the 2007 CaribeBasket tournament, where Puerto Rico won all round one games by over 25 points and went on to win gold. The 2008 Centrobasket was scheduled to take place before the Olympic Qualifying Tournament, but due to time constraints it was postponed. A group of prospects was included in the roster to replace Peter John Ramos and Ricky Sanchez, who were injured. Among those included was Ángel Daniel Vassallo, who played as a small forward in Virginia Tech. In the first game of the tournament, Puerto Rico defeated Costa Rica. In the other two games of the first round, the team defeated Cuba and Panama. During the course of the event, Carlos Arroyo and Larry Ayuso were forced to rest a game due to injuries. In the semifinals, the team scored a win over the Dominican Republic. Puerto Rico won the gold medal by defeating the United States Virgin Islands in the finals. The team has secured a spot for the 2010 FIBA World Championship by finishing in 1 of the top 4 spots in the 2009 FIBA Americas Championship. At the end, Puerto Rico finished the tournament with the silver medal, having lost the game against Argentina in the group stage, and losing the final against Brazil. Pending the performance at the 2010 FIBA World Championship, this cycle has had Puerto Rico with a record of 19–2 (Caribebasket 6–0, Centrobasket 5–0, FIBA Americas 8–2), not counting the 2nd-place finish at the 2009 Marchand Continental Championship Cup, where Puerto Rico won the exhibition games against Argentina and Canada, but lost the final to Brazil.

At the 2010 CentroBasket, Puerto Rico won Group B with Cuba finishing second. The team defeated Panama in semifinals and the Dominican Republic in the final to win the gold medal. Arroyo and Barea were included in the tournament's All-Star Team.

In 2010, the Puerto Rican Basketball Federation relieved Manolo Cintron of his coaching duties, and on 8 June 2011, the Federation officially announced the new head coach of the national team, Flor Melendez, which will be Melendez's second stint with the team as head coach.

On 27 August 2011, a chartered airplane carrying the team as well as the Canadian, Dominican and Brazilian national basketball teams from Foz de Iguacu, Brazil, to Mar del Plata, Argentina, made an emergency landing at Ezeiza International Airport, Buenos Aires, Argentina, after experiencing severe weather conditions mid-flight. The plane left for Mar del Plata an hour and a half after it landed.

=== 2019 ===
On 26 February 2019, Puerto Rico defeated the Uruguayan national basketball team 65–61, securing their entrance into the 2019 FIBA Basketball World Cup in China They were drawn to Group C, facing 2nd-ranked Spain, alongside Iran and Tunisia, with Puerto Rico facing Iran and Tunisia for the very first time.

=== 2023 FIBA World Cup ===
On 27 July 2023, the New Orleans Pelicans announced that for precautionary reasons that Puerto Rican star PG Jose Alvarado would miss the 2023 FIBA world cup to allow him to heal up for the upcoming NBA season.

On 10 August 2023, FIBA had announced the 2025 AmeriCup Qualifiers groups, placing PR in Group D with the United States, Cuba, and Bahamas.

=== 2024 ===
On July 7, 2024, Puerto Rico qualified for the 2024 Summer Olympics after defeating both Mexico in the semifinals and Lithuania in the final of one of four 2024 FIBA Men's Olympic Qualifying Tournaments. However, they were eliminated after back-to-back losses against South Sudan and Serbia as a result of their very poor performance at the Olympics, marred by their inconsistent playing styles that led to their early exit from the Olympics. In the final game, they lost to the United States. Ultimately, Puerto Rico finished dead last in the Olympics basketball as a result of their worst performance after their 20-year return.

== Uniform ==
During most of the 1980s and up until the late 1990s, the team wore a solid color uniform, with accent lines and the word "Puerto Rico" written in stylized cursive. Nowadays, the national team's uniform resembles a Puerto Rican flag, but also includes the traditional Puerto Rico letters in cursive. The uniforms are red or blue for "home" status, and white for "away".

== Competitive record ==
=== Summer Olympics ===
Year	Position	Pld	W	L
(Italy) 1960	13th	8	3	5
(Japan) 1964	4th	9	5	4
(Mexico) 1968	9th	9	5	4
(Germany) 1972	6th	9	6	3
(Canada) 1976	9th	7	3	4
(Soviet Union) 1980	Boycotted	–	–	–
(United States) 1984	Did not qualify	–	–	–
(South Korea) 1988	7th	8	4	4
(Spain) 1992	8th	8	3	5
(United States) 1996	10th	7	2	5
(Australia) 2000	Did not qualify	–	–	–
(Greece) 2004	6th	7	3	4
(China) 2008	Did not qualify	–	–	–
(United Kingdom) 2012	Did not qualify	–	–	–
(Brazil) 2016	Did not qualify	–	–	–
(Japan) 2020	Did not qualify	–	–	–
(France) 2024	12th	3	0	3
(United States) 2028	To be determined	–	–	–
(Australia) 2032	To be determined	–	–	–
Total		75	34	41

=== FIBA World Cup ===
Year	Position	Pld	W	L
(Chile) 1959	5th	9	3	6
(Brazil) 1963	6th	9	3	6
(Uruguay) 1967	12th	8	2	6
(Socialist Federal Republic of Yugoslavia) 1970	Did not qualify	–	–	–
(Puerto Rico) 1974	7th	7	2	5
(Philippines) 1978	10th	7	4	3
(Colombia) 1982	Did not qualify	–	–	–
(Spain) 1986	13th	5	2	3
(Argentina) 1990	4th	8	6	2
(Canada) 1994	6th	8	3	5
(Greece) 1998	11th	8	3	5
(United States) 2002	7th	9	6	3
(Japan) 2006	17th	5	2	3
(Turkey) 2010	18th	5	1	4
(Spain) 2014	19th	5	1	4
(China) 2019	15th	5	2	3
(Philippines) / (Japan) / (Indonesia) 2023	12th	5	3	2
(Qatar) 2027	To be determined	–	–	–
(France) 2031	To be determined			
Total		103	43	60

=== FIBA AmeriCup ===
FIBA Americas					Qualification		
Year	Pos.	Pld	W	L	Pld	W	L
(Puerto Rico) 1980	1st place, gold medalist(s)	6	5	1	Directly qualified		
(Brazil) 1984	6th	8	3	5	Directly qualified		
(Uruguay) 1988	2nd place, silver medalist(s)	8	6	2	Directly qualified		
(Mexico) 1989	1st place, gold medalist(s)	8	7	1	Directly qualified		
(United States) 1992	4th	7	4	3	Directly qualified		
(Puerto Rico) 1993	2nd place, silver medalist(s)	7	5	2	Directly qualified		
(Argentina) 1995	1st place, gold medalist(s)	10	9	1	Directly qualified		
(Uruguay) 1997	2nd place, silver medalist(s)	9	5	4	Directly qualified		
(Puerto Rico) 1999	4th	10	6	4	Directly qualified		
(Argentina) 2001	4th	9	5	4	Directly qualified		
(Puerto Rico) 2003	3rd place, bronze medalist(s)	10	6	4	Directly qualified		
(Dominican Republic) 2005	7th	8	4	4	Directly qualified		
(United States) 2007	3rd place, bronze medalist(s)	10	5	5	Directly qualified		
(Puerto Rico) 2009	2nd place, silver medalist(s)	10	8	2	Directly qualified		
(Argentina) 2011	4th	10	6	4	Directly qualified		
(Venezuela) 2013	2nd place, silver medalist(s)	10	7	3	Directly qualified		
(Mexico) 2015	5th	8	4	4	Directly qualified		
(Argentina) / (Colombia) / (Uruguay) 2017	5th	3	2	1	Directly qualified		
(Brazil) 2022	5th	4	2	2	Directly qualified		
(Nicaragua) 2025	6th	4	2	2	5	3	2
Total		157	101	58	5	3	2

1st place, gold medalist(s)	2nd place, silver medalist(s)	3rd place, bronze medalist(s)	Total
3	5	2	10

=== Pan American Games ===
Year	Position	Tournament	Host
1951	–	1951 Pan American Games	Buenos Aires, Argentina
1955	–	1955 Pan American Games	Mexico City, Mexico
1959	2nd place, silver medalist(s)	1959 Pan American Games	Chicago, United States
1963	3rd place, bronze medalist(s)	1963 Pan American Games	São Paulo, Brazil
1967	5	1967 Pan American Games	Winnipeg, Canada
1971	2nd place, silver medalist(s)	1971 Pan American Games	Cali, Colombia
1975	2nd place, silver medalist(s)	1975 Pan American Games	Mexico City, Mexico
1979	2nd place, silver medalist(s)	1979 Pan American Games	San Juan, Puerto Rico
1983	6	1983 Pan American Games	Caracas, Venezuela
1987	3rd place, bronze medalist(s)	1987 Pan American Games	Indianapolis, United States
1991	1st place, gold medalist(s)	1991 Pan American Games	Havana, Cuba
1995	6	1995 Pan American Games	Mar del Plata, Argentina
1999	3rd place, bronze medalist(s)	1999 Pan American Games	Winnipeg, Canada
2003	3rd place, bronze medalist(s)	2003 Pan American Games	Santo Domingo, Dominican Republic
2007	2nd place, silver medalist(s)	2007 Pan American Games	Rio de Janeiro, Brazil
2011	1st place, gold medalist(s)	2011 Pan American Games	Guadalajara, Mexico
2015	6	2015 Pan American Games	Toronto, Canada
2019	2nd place, silver medalist(s)	2019 Pan American Games	Lima, Peru
2023	7	2023 Pan American Games	Santiago, Chile

Since joining FIBA in 1957, Puerto Rico has participated in the basketball competition for all editions of the Pan American Games since 1959, obtaining medals in all but the 1967, 1983, 1995, 2015, and 2023 games. It has a total of 12 medals.

1st place, gold medalist(s)	2nd place, silver medalist(s)	3rd place, bronze medalist(s)	Total
2	6	4	12

=== Centrobasket ===
Year	Position	Tournament	Host
1965	2nd place, silver medalist(s)	1965 Centrobasket Championship	Mexico City, Mexico
1967	–	1967 Centrobasket Championship	San Salvador, El Salvador
1969	3rd place, bronze medalist(s)	1969 Centrobasket Championship	Havana, Cuba
1971	2nd place, silver medalist(s)	1971 Centrobasket Championship	Caracas, Venezuela
1973	1st place, gold medalist(s)	1973 Centrobasket Championship	San Juan, Puerto Rico
1975	2nd place, silver medalist(s)	1975 Centrobasket Championship	Santo Domingo, Dominican Republic
1977	2nd place, silver medalist(s)	1977 Centrobasket Championship	Panama City, Panama
1981	2nd place, silver medalist(s)	1981 Centrobasket Championship	San Juan Puerto Rico
1985	1st place, gold medalist(s)	1985 Centrobasket Championship	Mexico City, Mexico
1987	1st place, gold medalist(s)	1987 Centrobasket Championship	Santo Domingo, Dominican Republic
1989	1st place, gold medalist(s)	1989 Centrobasket Championship	Havana, Cuba
1991	1st place, gold medalist(s)	1991 CentroBasket Championship	Monterrey, Mexico
1993	1st place, gold medalist(s)	1993 Centrobasket Championship	Ponce, Puerto Rico
1995	3rd place, bronze medalist(s)	1995 Centrobasket Championship	Santo Domingo, Dominican Republic
1997	2nd place, silver medalist(s)	1997 Centrobasket Championship	Tegucigalpa, Honduras
1999	2nd place, silver medalist(s)	1999 Centrobasket Championship	Havana, Cuba
2001	1st place, gold medalist(s)	2001 Centrobasket Championship	Toluca, Mexico
2003	1st place, gold medalist(s)	2003 Centrobasket Championship	Culiacán, Mexico
2004	2nd place, silver medalist(s)	2004 Centrobasket Championship	Santo Domingo, Dominican Republic
2006	3rd place, bronze medalist(s)	2006 Centrobasket Championship	Panama City, Panama
2008	1st place, gold medalist(s)	2008 Centrobasket Championship	Cancún, Mexico
2010	1st place, gold medalist(s)	2010 Centrobasket Championship	Santo Domingo, Dominican Republic
2012	2nd place, silver medalist(s)	2012 Centrobasket Championship	San Juan, Puerto Rico
2014	2nd place, silver medalist(s)	2014 Centrobasket Championship	Nayarit, Mexico
2016	1st place, gold medalist(s)	2016 Centrobasket Championship	Panama City, Panama

Puerto Rico has a great record at the Centrobasket Championships, having participated in all of them but 1967, and obtaining a medal in all.

1st place, gold medalist(s)	2nd place, silver medalist(s)	3rd place, bronze medalist(s)	Total
11	10	3	24

=== Central American and Caribbean Games ===
Year	Position	Tournament	Host
1926	–	1926 Central American and Caribbean Games	Mexico City, Mexico
1930	–	1930 Central American and Caribbean Games	Havana, Cuba
1935	3rd place, bronze medalist(s)	1935 Central American and Caribbean Games	San Salvador, El Salvador
1938	4	1938 Central American and Caribbean Games	Panama City, Panama
1946	5	1946 Central American and Caribbean Games	Barranquilla, Colombia
1950	5	1950 Central American and Caribbean Games	Guatemala City, Guatemala
1954	3rd place, bronze medalist(s)	1954 Central American and Caribbean Games	Mexico City, Mexico
1959	2nd place, silver medalist(s)	1959 Central American and Caribbean Games	Caracas, Venezuela
1962	1st place, gold medalist(s)	1962 Central American and Caribbean Games	Kingston, Jamaica
1966	1st place, gold medalist(s)	1966 Central American and Caribbean Games	San Juan, Puerto Rico
1970	3rd place, bronze medalist(s)	1970 Central American and Caribbean Games	Panama City, Panama
1974	2nd place, silver medalist(s)	1974 Central American and Caribbean Games	Santo Domingo, Dominican Republic
1978	1st place, gold medalist(s)	1978 Central American and Caribbean Games	Medellin, Colombia
1982	2nd place, silver medalist(s)	1982 Central American and Caribbean Games	Havana, Cuba
1986	2nd place, silver medalist(s)	1986 Central American and Caribbean Games	Santiago de los Caballeros, Dominican Republic
1990	2nd place, silver medalist(s)	1990 Central American and Caribbean Games	Mexico City, Mexico
1993	1st place, gold medalist(s)	1993 Central American and Caribbean Games	Ponce, Puerto Rico
1998	6	1998 Central American and Caribbean Games	Maracaibo, Venezuela
2002	2nd place, silver medalist(s)	2002 Central American and Caribbean Games	San Salvador, El Salvador
2006	1st place, gold medalist(s)	2006 Central American and Caribbean Games	Cartagena, Colombia
2010	1st place, gold medalist(s)	2010 Central American and Caribbean Games	Mayagüez, Puerto Rico
2014	3rd place, bronze medalist(s)	2014 Central American and Caribbean Games	Veracruz, Mexico
2018	1st place, gold medalist(s)	2018 Central American and Caribbean Games	Barranquilla, Colombia
2023	3rd place, bronze medalist(s)	2023 Central American and Caribbean Games	San Salvador, El Salvador

Since its basketball debut in the 1935 Games, Puerto Rico has only failed to medal in the 1938, 1946, 1950, and 1998 Games. The team has a total of 16 medals.

1st place, gold medalist(s)	2nd place, silver medalist(s)	3rd place, bronze medalist(s)	Total
6	6	5	17

=== CaribeBasket Championships ===
Year	Position	Tournament	Host
2007	1st place, gold medalist(s)	2007 CaribeBasket Championship	Caguas, Puerto Rico

Since the founding of the CaribeBasket tournament in 1981 as a CentroBasket qualification stage for Caribbean countries, Puerto Rico has only participated in the 2007 tournament, after failing to classify directly to CentroBasket 2008. In this tournament, it won all round one games by over 25 points and went on to win gold.

=== Goodwill Games ===
Year	Position	Tournament	Host
1986	13	1986 Goodwill Games	Moscow, Soviet Union
1990	6	1990 Goodwill Games	Seattle, Washington, United States
1994	1st place, gold medalist(s)	1994 Goodwill Games	St. Petersburg, Russia
1998	4	1998 Goodwill Games	New York City, New York, United States
2001	–	2001 Goodwill Games	Brisbane, Australia

Because the 1986 FIBA World Championship was scheduled to be held at the same time as the 1986 Goodwill Games, the inaugural men's Goodwill Games basketball title was based on results from the World's. For the 2001 games, although scheduled to compete with seven other teams, Puerto Rico was not able to make it to the tournament, being replaced by Mexico, which finished 7th.

=== FIBA World Olympic qualifying tournament ===
Year	Position	Tournament	Host	Comment
1960	N/A	1960 Pre-Olympic Basketball Tournament	Bologna, Italy	Qualified – 1959 Pan Am Games – 2nd place
1964	N/A	1964 Pre-Olympic Basketball Tournament	Yokohama, Japan	Qualified – 1963 Pan Am Games – 3rd place
1968	N/A	1968 Pre-Olympic Basketball Tournament	Monterrey, Mexico	Qualified – 1964 Olympic Games – 4th place
1972	N/A	1972 Pre-Olympic Basketball Tournament	Augsburg, Germany	Qualified – 1971 Pan Am Games – 2nd place
1976	N/A	1976 Pre-Olympic Basketball Tournament	Hamilton, Canada	Qualified – 1975 Pan Am Games – 2nd place
1980–2004	Did not take place.			
2008	4	2008 FIBA World Olympic Qualifying Tournament	Athens, Greece	Did not qualify – reached Semi-final.
2012	5	2012 FIBA World Olympic Qualifying Tournament	Caracas, Venezuela	Did not qualify – reached Quarter-final.
2016	2	2016 FIBA World Olympic Qualifying Tournament	Belgrade, Serbia	Did not qualify – reached Final.
2020	3	2020 FIBA World Olympic Qualifying Tournament	Belgrade, Serbia	Did not qualify – reached Semi-final.
2024	1	2024 FIBA World Olympic Qualifying Tournament	San Juan, Puerto Rico	Qualified

=== Marchand Continental Championship Cup ===
Year	Position	Tournament	Host
2007	4	2007 Marchand Continental Championship Cup	San Juan, Puerto Rico
2009	2	2009 Marchand Continental Championship Cup	San Juan, Puerto Rico
2011	2	2011 Marchand Continental Championship Cup	Foz do Iguaçu, Brazil
2013	1	2013 Marchand Continental Championship Cup	San Juan, Puerto Rico
2015	2	2015 Marchand Continental Championship Cup	San Juan, Puerto Rico

=== Other international events ===
Year	Position	Tournament	Host
1991	1	Winston Basketball Cup	San Juan, Puerto Rico
2005	6	2005 Stanković Continental Champions' Cup	Beijing, China
2008	2	2008 Bamberg Super Cup	Bamberg, Germany
2008	2	2008 Alpos International Cup	Maribor, Slovenia
2013	4	2013 Stankovic Continental Champions Cup – Tournament 1	Lanzhou, China
2013	4	2013 Stankovic Continental Champions Cup – Tournament 2	Guangzhou, China

== Team ==
=== Current roster ===
Roster for the 2025 FIBA AmeriCup.

Puerto Rico men's national basketball team roster
Players
Coaches

Pos.	No.	Name	Age – Date of birth	Height	Club	Ctr.
PF	0	Isaiah Pineiro	30 – 2 February 1995	2.01 m (6 ft 7 in)	Cangrejeros de Santurce	(Puerto Rico)
F	1	George Conditt IV	25 – 22 August 2000	2.12 m (6 ft 11 in)	CB Gran Canaria	(Spain)
F	6	RJ Meléndez	22 – 3 December 2002	1.98 m (6 ft 6 in)	Capitanes de Arecibo	(Puerto Rico)
G	9	Gary Browne	32 – 24 March 1993	1.85 m (6 ft 1 in)	Vaqueros de Bayamón	(Puerto Rico)
PG	10	Jose Alvarado	27 – 12 April 1998	1.83 m (6 ft 0 in)	New York Knicks	(United States)
PF	16	Alexander Kappos	28 – 26 July 1997	2.08 m (6 ft 10 in)	Criollos de Caguas	(Puerto Rico)
SF	20	Jordan Cintrón	27 – 11 June 1998	2.03 m (6 ft 8 in)	Vaqueros de Bayamón	(Puerto Rico)
G	21	Iván Gandía	27 – 14 September 1997	1.82 m (6 ft 0 in)	Santeros de Aguada	(Puerto Rico)
G	24	Gian Clavell (C)	31 – 26 November 1993	1.93 m (6 ft 4 in)	Piratas de Quebradillas	(Puerto Rico)
SG	25	Alfonso Plummer	27 – 4 September 1997	1.85 m (6 ft 1 in)	ratiopharm Ulm	(Germany)
C	28	Ismael Romero	34 – 23 June 1991	2.03 m (6 ft 8 in)	Mets de Guaynabo	(Puerto Rico)
PF	41	Arnaldo Toro	27 – 28 October 1997	2.02 m (6 ft 8 in)	Santeros de Aguada	(Puerto Rico)

Head coach

- (Puerto Rico) Carlos González

Assistant coach(es)

- (Puerto Rico) Wilhelmus Caanen
- (Puerto Rico) Christian Dalmau

Legend

- (C) Team captain
- Club – describes last
  club before the tournament
- Age – describes age
  on 22 August 2025

=== Retired numbers ===
Puerto Rico retired numbers
No.	Player	Pos.	Tenure	Ref.
4	José Ortiz	PF / C	1983–2004	
14	Raymond Dalmau	PF	1966–1985	

=== Head coach position ===
- (Puerto Rico) Víctor Mario Pérez (1959)
- (United States) Howie Shannon (1960–1963)
- (Puerto Rico) José Garrige (1963)
- (United States) Lou Rossini (1964–1967)
- (Puerto Rico) Fufi Santori (1967)
- (United States) Lou Rossini (1968–1972)
- (United States) Gene Bartow (1972–1974)
- (Puerto Rico) Armando Torres (1974–1976)
- (United States) Tom Nissalke (1976–1978)
- (Puerto Rico) Víctor Ojeda (1978–1986)
- (Puerto Rico) Ángel Cancel (1986–1988)
- (Puerto Rico) Armando Torres Ortiz (1988–1990)
- (Puerto Rico) Raymond Dalmau (1990–1994)
- (Puerto Rico) Carlos Morales (1994–2002)
- (Puerto Rico) Julio Toro (2002–2006)
- (Puerto Rico) Manolo Cintrón (2010–2011)
- (Puerto Rico) Flor Meléndez (2011–2013)
- (Spain) Paco Olmos (2013–2014)
- (United States) Rick Pitino (2015)
- (Puerto Rico) Eddie Casiano (2016–2021)
- (Puerto Rico) Omar González (2019; Pan American Games)
- (Puerto Rico) Nelson Colón (2021–present)

=== Past rosters ===
1959 World Championship

- Alfonso Lastra
- Juan "Pachin" Vicens
- Juan Ramon "Johnny" Baez
- Jose Angel Cestero
- Johnny Rodriguez
- Evelio Droz
- John Morales
- Jose Antonio Casillas
- Martin Jimenez
- Jose A. Ruano
- Salvador Dijols (Coach: Victor Mario Perez)

1960 Summer Olympic Games

- Juan "Pachin" Vicens
- Teofilo "Teo" Cruz
- Evelio Droz
- Juan Ramon "Johnny" Baez
- Jose Angel Cestero
- Jose Antonio Casillas
- Johnny Rodriguez
- Rafael Valle
- Jose Santori
- Angel Cancel
- John Morales
- Cesar Bocachica (Coach: Howie Shannon)

1963 World Championship

- Juan "Pachin" Vicens
- Juan Ramon "Johnny" Baez
- Bill McCadney
- Rafael Valle
- Evelio Droz
- Salvador Dijols
- Eduardo Alvarez
- Cesar Bocachica
- Ramon Siragusa
- Tomas Gutierrez
- Angel Cancel
- Armando Torres (Coach: Jose Garrige)

1964 Summer Olympic Games

- Teofilo "Teo" Cruz
- Juan "Pachin" Vicens
- Bill McCadney
- Juan Ramon "Johnny" Baez
- Tomas Gutierrez
- Evelio Droz
- Ruben Adorno
- Angel Cancel
- Martin Anza
- Alberto Zamot
- Jaime Frontera
- Angel Garcia (Coach: Lou Rossini)

1967 World Championship

- Raymond Dalmau
- Bill McCadney
- Tomas Gutierrez
- Angel Cancel
- Rafael Rivera
- Gustavo Mattei
- Francisco Cordova
- Mariano Ortiz
- Alberto Zamot
- Victor Cuevas
- Adolfo Porrata
- Richard Pietri (Coach: Jose Santori Coll)

1968 Summer Olympic Games

- Raymond Dalmau
- Teofilo "Teo" Cruz
- Bill McCadney
- Joe Hatton
- Ruben Adorno
- Alberto Zamot
- Angel Cancel
- Tomas Gutierrez
- Mariano Ortiz
- Francisco Cordova
- Jaime Frontera
- Adolfo Porrata (Coach: Lou Rossini)

1972 Summer Olympic Games

- Teofilo "Teo" Cruz
- Raymond Dalmau
- Hector Blondet
- Neftali Rivera
- Ruben Rodriguez
- Joe Hatton
- Mariano Ortiz
- Billy Baum
- Earl Brown
- Miguel Coll
- Jimmy Thordsen
- Ricardo Calzada (Coach: Gene Bartow)

1974 World Championship

- Teofilo "Teo" Cruz
- Raymond Dalmau
- Neftali Rivera
- Hector Blondet
- Ruben Rodriguez
- Jimmy Thordsen
- Mariano Ortiz
- Michael Vicens
- Ruben Montanez
- Carlos Bermudez
- Jose Pacheco
- Luis Brignoni (Coach: Armandito Torres Ortiz)

1976 Summer Olympic Games

- Teofilo "Teo" Cruz
- Raymond Dalmau
- Neftali Rivera
- Earl Brown
- Hector Blondet
- Jimmy Thordsen
- Mariano Ortiz
- Michael Vicens
- Roberto "Bobby" Alvarez
- Alfred Lee
- Ruben Rodriguez
- Luis Brignoni (Coach: Tom Nissalke)

1978 World Championship

- Raymond Dalmau
- Neftali Rivera
- Ruben Rodriguez
- Angel "Cachorro" Santiago
- Steven Sewell
- Hector Olivencia, Willie Quinones
- Georgie Torres
- Carlos Bermudez
- Mario Morales
- J. Villet
- O. Rodriguez (Coach: Victor Ojeda)

1986 World Championship

- Federico "Fico" Lopez
- Ramon Rivas
- Jerome Mincy
- Angelo Cruz
- Felix Rivera
- Edgar de Leon
- Wesley Correa
- Jose Sosa
- Orlando Febres
- Frankie Torruellas
- Mario Morales
- Francisco de Leon (Coach: Angel Cancel)

1988 Summer Olympic Games

- Federico "Fico" Lopez
- Jose "Piculin" Ortiz
- Ramon Ramos
- Jerome Mincy
- Ramon Rivas
- Angelo Cruz
- Edgar de Leon
- Mario Morales
- Roberto Rios
- Francisco de Leon
- Raymond Gausse
- Vicente Ithier (Coach: Armandito Torres Ortiz)

1990 World Championship

- Federico "Fico" Lopez
- Jose "Piculin" Ortiz
- Ramon Rivas
- Jerome Mincy
- Angelo Cruz
- Edgar de Leon
- James Carter
- Francisco de Leon
- Georgie Torres
- Raymond Gausse
- Jose Agosto
- Orlando Marrero (Coach: Raymond Dalmau)

1992 Summer Olympic Games

- Jose "Piculin" Ortiz
- Federico "Fico" Lopez
- Eddie Casiano
- Ramon Rivas
- Jerome Mincy
- Edgar de Leon
- James Carter
- Mario Morales
- Richard Soto
- Raymond Gausse
- Edwin Pellot
- Javier Antonio Colon (Coach: Raymond Dalmau)

1994 World Championship

- Jose "Piculin" Ortiz
- Federico "Fico" Lopez
- Eddie Casiano
- Edgar de Leon
- Jerome Mincy
- James Carter
- Orlando Vega
- Felix Perez
- Ruben Colon
- Dean Borges
- Javier Colon
- Luis Ramon Allende (Coach: Carlos Morales)

1996 Summer Olympic Games

- Jose "Piculin" Ortiz
- Ramon Rivas
- Daniel Santiago
- Pablo Alicea
- Edgar Padilla
- Jerome Mincy
- Richard Soto
- Heriberto "Eddie" Rivera
- George "Georgie" Torres
- Carmelo Travieso
- Eugenio Soto
- Luis Joel Curbelo (Coach: Carlos Morales)

1998 World Championship

- Jose "Piculin" Ortiz
- Eddie Casiano
- Orlando Vèga
- Daniel Santiago
- Jerome Mincy
- James Carter
- Eugenio Soto
- Edgar de Leon
- Carmelo Travieso
- Eddin Santiago
- Javier Colon
- Rolando Hourruitiner (Coach: Carlos Morales)

2002 World Championship

- Carlos Arroyo
- Elias "Larry" Ayuso
- Daniel Santiago
- Jose "Piculin" Ortiz
- Rick Apodaca
- Jerome Mincy
- Christian Dalmau
- Raymond "Richie" Dalmau
- Rolando Hourruitiner
- Luis Ramon Allende
- Antonio Latimer
- Felix Javier Perez (Coach: Julio Toro)

2004 Summer Olympic Games

- Carlos Arroyo
- Elias "Larry" Ayuso
- Jose "Piculin" Ortiz
- Daniel Santiago
- Eddie Casiano
- Rick Apodaca
- Christian Dalmau
- Sharif Karim Fajardo
- Peter John Ramos
- Roberto Jose "Bobby Joe" Hatton
- Rolando Hourruitiner
- Jorge Luis Rivera (Coach: Julio Toro)

2006 World Championship

- Carlos Arroyo
- David Huertas
- Daniel Santiago
- Rick Apodaca
- Guillermo Díaz
- Peter John Ramos
- Roberto Jose "Bobby Joe" Hatton
- Antonio "Puruco" Latimer
- Carmelo Antrone Lee
- Filiberto Isaac Rivera
- Manuel Antonio Narvaez
- Angelo Luis Reyes (Coach: Julio Toro)

== See also ==
- Puerto Rico women's national basketball team
