= 1993 Tournament of the Americas =

Tournament details
- Host country: Puerto Rico
- City: San Juan
- Dates: August 28 – September 5
- Teams: 10
- Venue: 1 (in 1 host city)

Final positions
- Champions: United States (2nd title)
- Runners-up: Puerto Rico
- Third place: Argentina
- Fourth place: Brazil

Tournament statistics
- Top scorer: (Argentina) Juan Espil

The 1993 Tournament of the Americas, later known as the FIBA Americas Championship and the FIBA AmeriCup, was a basketball championship hosted by Puerto Rico from August 28 to September 5, 1993. The games were played in San Juan. This FIBA AmeriCup was to earn the four berths allocated to the Americas for the 1994 FIBA World Championship in Toronto. The United States defeated Puerto Rico in the final to win the tournament, although they had already qualified for the World Championship by winning the 1992 Summer Olympics basketball tournament. Argentina defeated Brazil in the third place game. Cuba defeated Venezuela in the 5th place game. All five nations qualified for the 1994 FIBA World Championship.

== Qualification ==
Eight teams qualified during the qualification tournaments held in their respective zones in 1993; USA and Canada qualified automatically since they are the only two members of the North America zone.

- North America: Canada, United States
- Caribbean and Central America:Cuba, Dominican Republic, Panama, Puerto Rico
- South America: Argentina, Brazil, Uruguay, Venezuela

The draw split the tournament into two groups:

Group A

Brazil
Dominican Republic
Panama
United States
Venezuela

Group B

Argentina
Canada
Cuba
Puerto Rico
Uruguay

== Format ==
- The top four teams from each group advance to the knockout round. The losers from the knockout quarterfinals compete in a separate bracket to define fifth through eighth place.
- The winners in the knockout semifinals advanced to the Final and were granted berths in the 1994 FIBA World Championship in Canada. The losers figure in a third-place playoff and were both also granted berths in the FIBA World Championship. Since Canada and the United States were already qualified as hosts and Olympic Champions respectively, should they reach one of the top four positions in the final standings, one or two extra berths should be granted to the fifth and/or sixth team in the final standings.

== Preliminary round ==
Qualified for the quarterfinals

=== Group A ===
Team	Pld	W	L	PF	PA	PD	Pts
Brazil	4	3	1	354	344	+10	7
United States	4	3	1	391	384	+7	7
Panama	4	2	2	343	346	−3	6
Venezuela	4	2	2	344	338	+6	6
Dominican Republic	4	0	4	340	360	−20	4

August 28

United States	101–99	Panama

San Juan

August 28

Venezuela	98–83	Brazil

San Juan

August 29

United States	102–99	Dominican Republic

San Juan

August 29

Panama	80–76	Venezuela

San Juan

August 30

Brazil	84–80	Dominican Republic

San Juan

August 30

United States	97–85	Venezuela

San Juan

August 31

Venezuela	85–78	Dominican Republic

San Juan

August 31

Brazil	86–75	Panama

San Juan

September 1

Panama	89–83	Dominican Republic

San Juan

September 1

Brazil	101–91	United States

San Juan

=== Group B ===
Team	Pld	W	L	PF	PA	PD	Pts
Argentina	4	3	1	351	335	+16	7
Puerto Rico	4	3	1	392	292	+100	7
Canada	4	3	1	355	345	+10	7
Cuba	4	1	3	343	369	−26	5
Uruguay	4	0	4	314	414	−100	4

August 28

Argentina	93–83	Canada

San Juan

August 28

Puerto Rico	128–62	Uruguay

San Juan

August 29

Cuba	90–76	Uruguay

San Juan

August 29

Canada	79–76	Puerto Rico

San Juan

August 30

Argentina	92–84	Cuba

San Juan

August 30

Canada	102–86	Uruguay

San Juan

August 31

Puerto Rico	110–79	Cuba

San Juan

August 31

Argentina	94–90	Uruguay

San Juan

September 1

Canada	91–90	Cuba

San Juan

September 1

Puerto Rico	78–72	Argentina

San Juan

== Knockout round ==
=== Championship Bracket ===
Quarter-finals
September 3
Brazil	99
Cuba	88
September 3
Panama	73
Puerto Rico	90
September 3
United States	87
Canada	73
September 3
Argentina	93
Venezuela	82

Semi-finals
September 4
Brazil	97
Puerto Rico	111
September 4
United States	123
Argentina	107

Final
September 5
Puerto Rico	95
United States	109
Third place
September 5
Argentina	98
Brazil	91

== Classification round ==
=== 5th-8th places ===
Semi-finals
September 4
Cuba	96
Panama	83
September 4
Canada	86
Venezuela	94

Fifth place
September 5
Cuba	103
Venezuela	98
Seventh place
September 5
Panama	90
Canada	96

== Awards ==
=== Topscorer ===
Juan Espil of Argentina was the topscorer with 199 points (28.4 per game).

1993 Tournament of the Americas winners

United States
Second title

== Final standings ==
Qualified for the 1994 FIBA World Championship
Qualified for the 1994 FIBA World Championship as Olympic Champions
Qualified for the 1994 FIBA World Championship as hosts

Rank	Team	Record
1st place, gold medalist(s)	United States	6–1
2nd place, silver medalist(s)	Puerto Rico	5–2
3rd place, bronze medalist(s)	Argentina	5–2
4	Brazil	4–3
5	Cuba	3–4
6	Venezuela	3–4
7	Canada	4–3
8	Panama	2–5
9	Dominican Republic	0–4
10	Uruguay	0–4

== Sources ==
- 1993 edition
