= Basketball at the 1964 Summer Olympics =

Coordinates: 35.6678°N 139.7003°E

6th Olympic Basketball Tournament
- Tokyo 1964
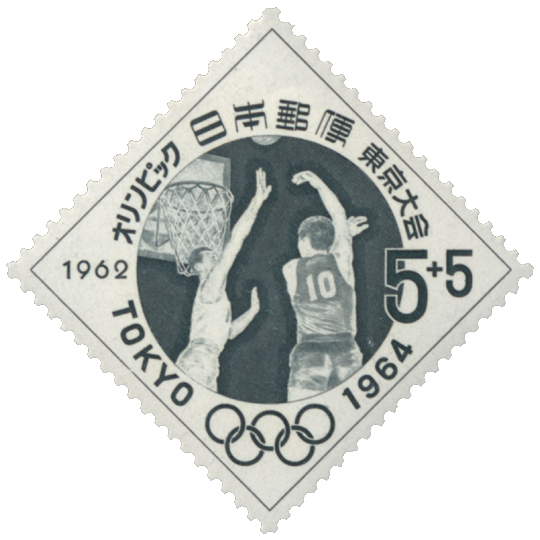

Tournament details
- Olympics: 1964 Summer Olympics
- Host nation: Japan
- City: Tokyo
- Duration: October 11–23, 1964

Men's tournament
- Teams: 16
Medals
Gold medalists	United States
Silver medalists	Soviet Union
Bronze medalists	Brazil

Tournaments
← Rome 1960	Mexico City 1968 →

Basketball contests at the 1964 Summer Olympics was the sixth appearance of the sport of basketball as an official Olympic medal event. It took place at the Yoyogi National Gymnasium in Tokyo, Japan from October 11 to October 23. The United States defeated the Soviet Union to win their sixth consecutive gold medal at this event, while Brazil earned the bronze against Puerto Rico.

== Results ==
Event	Gold	Silver	Bronze
Men's basketball	United States; Jim Barnes; Bill Bradley; Larry Brown; Joe Caldwell; Mel Counts; Richard Davies; Walt Hazzard; Lucious Jackson; John McCaffrey; Jeff Mullins; Jerry Shipp; George Wilson	Soviet Union; Valdis Muižnieks; Mykola Bahley; Armenak Alachachian; Alexandr Travin; Viacheslav Khrynin; Jānis Krūmiņš; Levan Moseshvili; Yury Korneev; Alexsandr Petrov; Gennadi Volnov; Jaak Lipso; Juris Kalniņš	Brazil; Amaury Antônio Pasos; Wlamir Marques; Ubiratan Pereira Maciel; Carlos Domingos Massoni; Friedrich Wilhelm Braun; Rosa Branca; Jatyr Eduardo Schall; Edson Bispo dos Santos; Antônio Salvador Sucar; Victor Mirshauswka; Sérgio de Toledo Machado; José Edvar Simões

== Qualification ==
Automatic qualifications were granted to the host country and the first eight places at the previous tournament. Additional spots were decided by various continental tournaments held by FIBA plus two additional intercontinental tournaments that granted six extra berths total, after the withdrawal of United Arab Republic and Czechoslovakia.

Means of qualification	Date	Venue	Berths	Qualified
Host nation			1	Japan
1960 Summer Olympics	26 August–10 September 1960	(Italy) Rome	~~8~~ 7	United States
1960 Summer Olympics	26 August–10 September 1960	(Italy) Rome	~~8~~ 7	Soviet Union
1960 Summer Olympics	26 August–10 September 1960	(Italy) Rome	~~8~~ 7	Brazil
1960 Summer Olympics	26 August–10 September 1960	(Italy) Rome	~~8~~ 7	Italy
1960 Summer Olympics	26 August–10 September 1960	(Italy) Rome	~~8~~ 7	Czechoslovakia^{[a]}
1960 Summer Olympics	26 August–10 September 1960	(Italy) Rome	~~8~~ 7	SFR Yugoslavia
1960 Summer Olympics	26 August–10 September 1960	(Italy) Rome	~~8~~ 7	Poland
1960 Summer Olympics	26 August–10 September 1960	(Italy) Rome	~~8~~ 7	Uruguay
1963 Pan American Games	23 April–3 May 1963	(Brazil) São Paulo	2	Puerto Rico
1963 Pan American Games	23 April–3 May 1963	(Brazil) São Paulo	2	Peru
FIBA Africa Championship 1964	4–8 March 1964	(Morocco) Casablanca	~~1~~ 0	United Arab Republic^{[a]}
European Pre-Olympic Tournament	4–13 June 1964	(Switzerland) Geneva	2	Finland
European Pre-Olympic Tournament	4–13 June 1964	(Switzerland) Geneva	2	Hungary
Pan-Continental Pre-Olympic Tournament	25 September–3 October 1964	(Japan) Yokohama	~~2~~ 4	Mexico
Pan-Continental Pre-Olympic Tournament	25 September–3 October 1964	(Japan) Yokohama	~~2~~ 4	Australia
Pan-Continental Pre-Olympic Tournament	25 September–3 October 1964	(Japan) Yokohama	~~2~~ 4	Canada^{[b]}
Pan-Continental Pre-Olympic Tournament	25 September–3 October 1964	(Japan) Yokohama	~~2~~ 4	South Korea^{[b]}
Total			16	

- ^{a} Withdrew from the tournament.
- ^{b} Replacement teams.

== Format ==
- Two groups of eight teams are formed, where the top two from each group compete for the medals in a knockout round.
- The remaining places are defined as follows:
  - Fifth through eighth places are decided in a separate bracket between the third and fourth places from each group in a separate bracket.
  - Ninth through sixteenth places are decided between the fifth through eighth places from each group in separate brackets.

== Squads ==
For the team rosters see: Basketball at the 1964 Summer Olympics – Men's team rosters.

== Preliminary round ==
The top two teams from each group advance to the semifinals, while the remaining teams compete for 5th through 16th places in separate brackets. Both group leaders, the United States and the Soviet Union advanced undefeated to the knockout stage.

=== Group A ===
Pos	Team	Pld	W	L	PF	PA	PD	Pts	Qualification
1	Soviet Union	7	7	0	562	424	+138	14	Semifinals
2	Puerto Rico	7	5	2	493	454	+39	12	Semifinals
3	Poland	7	4	3	467	448	+19	11 (Note: Head-to-head record: Poland 1–0 Italy)	5th–8th classification round
4	Italy	7	4	3	495	480	+15	11	5th–8th classification round
5	Mexico	7	3	4	485	514	−29	10 (Note: Head-to-head record: Mexico 1–0 Japan)	9th–12th classification round
6	Japan (H)	7	3	4	421	428	−7	10	9th–12th classification round
7	Hungary	7	2	5	407	469	−62	9	13th–16th classification round
8	Canada	7	0	7	408	521	−113	7	13th–16th classification round

Source: FIBA archive
Rules for classification: 1) points; 2) head-to-head points; 3) head-to-head goal average; 4) head-to-head number of points scored.
(H) Hosts
Notes:

October 11

13:30

Poland	56–53	Hungary

Yoyogi National Gymnasium, Tokyo

16:00

Italy	85–80	Mexico

Yoyogi National Gymnasium, Tokyo

17:30

Japan	55–65	Puerto Rico

Yoyogi National Gymnasium, Tokyo

19:00

Soviet Union	87–52	Canada

Yoyogi National Gymnasium, Tokyo

October 12

10:30

Italy	74–64	Puerto Rico

Yoyogi National Gymnasium, Tokyo

12:00

Poland	81–57	Japan

Yoyogi National Gymnasium, Tokyo

19:00

Soviet Union	87–76	Mexico

Yoyogi National Gymnasium, Tokyo

20:30

Canada	59–70	Hungary

Yoyogi National Gymnasium, Tokyo

October 13

12:00

Italy	58–61	Poland

Yoyogi National Gymnasium, Tokyo

13:30

Puerto Rico	73–55	Mexico

Yoyogi National Gymnasium, Tokyo

16:00

Soviet Union	84–42	Hungary

Yoyogi National Gymnasium, Tokyo

19:00

Canada	37–58	Japan

Yoyogi National Gymnasium, Tokyo

October 14

9:00

Soviet Union	82–63	Puerto Rico

Yoyogi National Gymnasium, Tokyo

12:00

Hungary	41–58	Japan

Yoyogi National Gymnasium, Tokyo

16:00

Canada	54–66	Italy

Yoyogi National Gymnasium, Tokyo

20:30

Mexico	71–70	Poland

Yoyogi National Gymnasium, Tokyo

October 16

12:00

Mexico	78–68	Canada

Yoyogi National Gymnasium, Tokyo

16:00

Hungary	73–77	Italy

Yoyogi National Gymnasium, Tokyo

17:30

Soviet Union	72–59	Japan

Yoyogi National Gymnasium, Tokyo

20:30

Puerto Rico	66–60	Poland

Yoyogi National Gymnasium, Tokyo

October 17

9:00

Japan	72–68	Italy

Yoyogi National Gymnasium, Tokyo

10:00

Hungary	69–61	Mexico

Yoyogi National Gymnasium, Tokyo

12:00

Soviet Union	74–65	Poland

Yoyogi National Gymnasium, Tokyo

13:30

Puerto Rico	88–69	Canada

Yoyogi National Gymnasium, Tokyo

October 18

9:00

Puerto Rico	74–59	Hungary

Yoyogi National Gymnasium, Tokyo

10:00

Poland	74–69	Canada

Yoyogi National Gymnasium, Tokyo

12:00

Japan	62–64	Mexico

Yoyogi National Gymnasium, Tokyo

13:30

Soviet Union	76–67	Italy

Yoyogi National Gymnasium, Tokyo

=== Group B ===
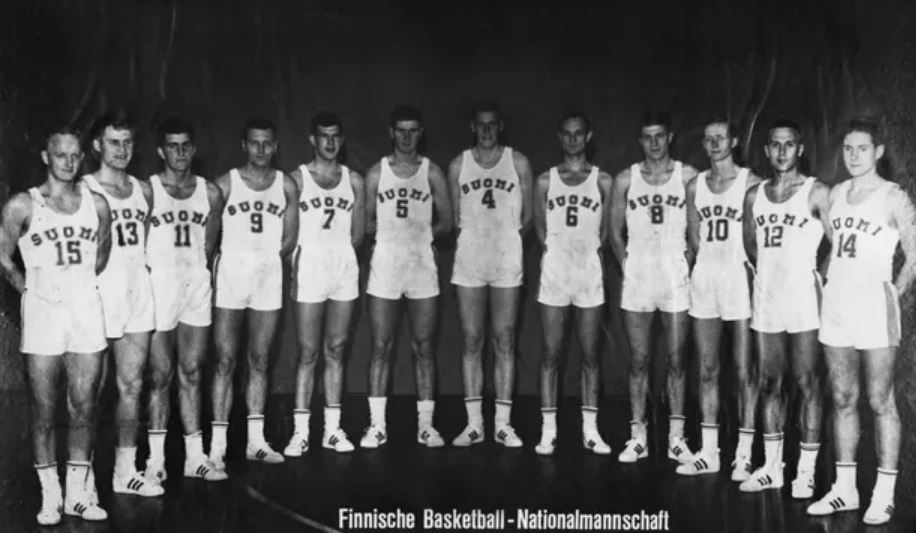
Finnish basketball team at the 1964 Tokyo Olympics

Pos	Team	Pld	W	L	PF	PA	PD	Pts	Qualification
1	United States	7	7	0	569	333	+236	14	Semifinals
2	Brazil	7	5	2	473	452	+21	12 (Note: Head-to-head record: Brazil 1–0 Yugoslavia)	Semifinals
3	Yugoslavia	7	5	2	529	453	+76	12	5th–8th classification round
4	Uruguay	7	4	3	472	482	−10	11	5th–8th classification round
5	Finland	7	3	4	409	475	−66	10	9th–12th classification round
6	Australia	7	2	5	434	460	−26	9 (Note: Head-to-head record: Australia 1–0 Peru)	9th–12th classification round
7	Peru	7	2	5	431	453	−22	9	13th–16th classification round
8	South Korea	7	0	7	432	641	−209	7	13th–16th classification round

Source: FIBA archive
Rules for classification: 1) points; 2) head-to-head points; 3) head-to-head goal average; 4) head-to-head number of points scored.
Notes:

October 11

9:00

South Korea	72–80	Finland

Yoyogi National Gymnasium, Tokyo

10:30

Brazil	50–58	Peru

Yoyogi National Gymnasium, Tokyo

12:00

SFR Yugoslavia	84–71	Uruguay

Yoyogi National Gymnasium, Tokyo

20:30

United States	78–45	Australia

Yoyogi National Gymnasium, Tokyo

October 12

9:00

South Korea	64–105	Uruguay

Yoyogi National Gymnasium, Tokyo

13:30

Brazil	68–64	SFR Yugoslavia

Yoyogi National Gymnasium, Tokyo

16:00

United States	77–51	Finland

Yoyogi National Gymnasium, Tokyo

17:30

Australia	81–62	Peru

Yoyogi National Gymnasium, Tokyo

October 13

9:00

United States	60–45	Peru

Yoyogi National Gymnasium, Tokyo

10:30

Finland	55–73	Uruguay

Yoyogi National Gymnasium, Tokyo

13:30

Australia	70–74	SFR Yugoslavia

Yoyogi National Gymnasium, Tokyo

20:30

South Korea	65–92	Brazil

Yoyogi National Gymnasium, Tokyo

October 14

10:30

United States	83–28	Uruguay

Yoyogi National Gymnasium, Tokyo

13:30

Peru	64–73	SFR Yugoslavia

Yoyogi National Gymnasium, Tokyo

17:30

Finland	54–61	Brazil

Yoyogi National Gymnasium, Tokyo

19:00

Australia	65–58	South Korea

Yoyogi National Gymnasium, Tokyo

October 16

9:00

Finland	61–59	Australia

Yoyogi National Gymnasium, Tokyo

10:30

Peru	84–57	South Korea

Yoyogi National Gymnasium, Tokyo

13:30

Uruguay	68–80	Brazil

Yoyogi National Gymnasium, Tokyo

19:00

United States	69–61	SFR Yugoslavia

Yoyogi National Gymnasium, Tokyo

October 17

16:00

SFR Yugoslavia	99–66	South Korea

Yoyogi National Gymnasium, Tokyo

17:30

Peru	59–63	Finland

Yoyogi National Gymnasium, Tokyo

19:00

United States	86–53	Brazil

Yoyogi National Gymnasium, Tokyo

20:30

Uruguay	58–57	Australia

Yoyogi National Gymnasium, Tokyo

October 18

10:30

United States	116–50	South Korea

Yoyogi National Gymnasium, Tokyo

13:30

SFR Yugoslavia	74–45	Finland

Yoyogi National Gymnasium, Tokyo

17:30

Brazil	69–57	Australia

Yoyogi National Gymnasium, Tokyo

20:30

Uruguay	69–59	Peru

Yoyogi National Gymnasium, Tokyo

== Knockout stage ==
=== Championship playoffs ===
Semifinals (October 21); One-game playoff
A1	Soviet Union	53
B2	Brazil	47
B1	United States	62
A2	Puerto Rico	42

Gold medal Final (October 23); One-game playoff
B1	United States	73
A1	Soviet Union	59
Bronze medal game (October 23); One-game playoff
A2	Puerto Rico	60
B2	Brazil	76

=== Classification brackets ===
5th–8th Place

Semifinals (October 20)
A3	Poland	82
B4	Uruguay	69
B3	SFR Yugoslavia	63
A4	Italy	75

5th place (October 22)
A3	Poland	59
A4	Italy	79
7th place (October 22)
B3	SFR Yugoslavia	78
B4	Uruguay	55

9th–12th Place

Semifinals (October 21)
A5	Mexico	58
B6	Australia	70
B5	Finland	45
A6	Japan	54

9th place (October 23)
B6	Australia	64
A6	Japan	57
11th place (October 23)
A5	Mexico	72
B5	Finland	73

13th–16th Place

Semifinals (October 20)
A7	Hungary	99
B8	South Korea	83
B7	Peru	81
A8	Canada	82

13th place (October 22)
A7	Hungary	68
A8	Canada	65
15th place (October 22)
B7	South Korea	66
B8	Peru	71

== Awards ==
1964 Olympic Basketball Champions

United States
Sixth title

== Final standings ==
Rank	Team	W	L
1st place, gold medalist(s)	United States	9	0
2nd place, silver medalist(s)	Soviet Union	8	1
3rd place, bronze medalist(s)	Brazil	6	3
4th	Puerto Rico	5	4
5th	Italy	6	3
6th	Poland	5	4
7th	SFR Yugoslavia	6	3
8th	Uruguay	4	5
9th	Australia	4	5
10th	Japan	4	5
11th	Finland	4	5
12th	Mexico	3	6
13th	Hungary	4	5
14th	Canada	1	8
15th	Peru	3	6
16th	South Korea	0	9
