= 2013 FIBA Stanković Continental Champions' Cup =

2013 (I) FIBA Stanković Continental Champions Cup
10th FIBA Stanković Continental Champions Cup

Tournament details
- Host country: China
- Dates: June 27 – July 9
- Teams: 6
- Venue(s): 1 (in 1 host city)

Final positions
- Champions: Australia (2nd title)

Tournament statistics
- Games played: 15

The 2013 FIBA Stanković Continental Champions' Cup, or 2013 FIBA Mini World Cup, officially called Dongfeng Yueda KIA FIBA Stanković Continental Champions' Cup 2013 editions (I) and (II), were the 10th and 11th annual FIBA Stanković Continental Champions' Cup tournaments. They were held as two separate round-robin tournaments, in Lanzhou and Guangzhou, from June 27 to July 9.

== Lanzhou Tournament ==
=== Participating teams ===
- Argentina
- Australia University
- China Olympic
- Germany
- Nigeria
- Puerto Rico

=== Matches ===
==== June 27 ====
Germany 61–56 Nigeria

China Olympic 79–67 Puerto Rico

Argentina 59–62 Australia University

==== June 28 ====
Nigeria 66–70 Puerto Rico

China Olympic 59–64 Australia University

Germany 60–77 Argentina

==== June 29 ====
Puerto Rico 68–72 Australia University

Argentina 71–54 Nigeria

China Olympic 60–51 Germany

==== June 30 ====
Puerto Rico 61–71 Argentina

China Olympic 57–60 Nigeria

Australia University 79–64 Germany

==== July 2 ====
Nigeria 61 – 76 Australia University

China Olympic 59 – 66 Argentina

Germany 56 – 66 Puerto Rico

=== Final standings ===
Rank	Team	Record	Tie*
Gold medal	Australia University	5-0	
Silver medal	Argentina	4-1	
Bronze medal	China Olympic	2-3	1-0
4th	Puerto Rico	2-3	0-1
5th	Germany	1-4	1-0
6th	Nigeria	1-4	0-1

- Head-to-head record

== Guangzhou Tournament ==
2013 (I) FIBA Stanković Continental Champions Cup
10th FIBA Stanković Continental Champions Cup

Tournament details
- Host country: China
- Dates: June 27 – July 9
- Teams: 4
- Venue(s): 1 (in 1 host city)

Final positions
- Champions: Argentina (1st title)

Tournament statistics
- Games played: 8

=== Participating teams ===
- Argentina
- China
- Nigeria
- Puerto Rico

=== Matches ===
==== Group stage ====
===== July 5 =====
China 58 - 52 Nigeria

Argentina 72 - 58 Puerto Rico

===== July 6 =====
China 73 - 62 Puerto Rico

Nigeria 58 - 73 Argentina

===== July 7 =====
China 58 - 66 Argentina

Nigeria 47 - 59 Puerto Rico

==== Standings ====
Team	Pld	W	L	PF	PA	PD	Pts
Argentina	3	3	0	211	174	37	6
China	3	2	1	189	180	9	5
Puerto Rico	3	1	2	179	192	-13	3
Nigeria	3	0	3	157	190	-33	4

==== Final stage ====
===== July 9 =====
====== Third-place Playoff ======
Puerto Rico 67 - 70 Nigeria

====== Final ======
Argentina 61 - 44 China

=== Final standings ===
Rank	Team	Record
Gold medal	Argentina	4-0
Silver medal	China	2-2
Bronze medal	Nigeria	1-3
4th	Puerto Rico	1-3
