= Basketball at the 1990 Goodwill Games – Men's tournament =

1990 edition of the FIBA World Championship

Tournament details
- Host country: United States
- City: Seattle
- Dates: 23–30 July
- Teams: 8 (from 3 confederations)
- Venue: Seattle Center Coliseum

Final positions
- Champions: Yugoslavia
- Runners-up: United States
- Third place: Soviet Union
- Fourth place: Brazil

Tournament statistics
- Games played: 20

The men's tournament of basketball at the 1990 Goodwill Games in Seattle, United States, began on July 23 and ended on July 30.

The Yugoslavia won the gold medal after defeating the United States 85–79 in the final, with the Soviet Union winning the bronze medal by beating Brazil.

== Participants ==
- Australia
- Brazil
- Italy
- Puerto Rico
- Spain
- United States (host)
- Soviet Union
- Yugoslavia

== Preliminary round ==
=== Group A ===
Pos	Team	Pld	W	L	PF	PA	PD	Pts	Qualification
1	Brazil	3	3	0	310	268	+42	6	Semifinals
2	Yugoslavia	3	2	1	259	239	+20	5	Semifinals
3	Spain	3	1	2	234	266	−32	4	5th–8th classification round
4	Australia	3	0	3	242	272	−30	3	5th–8th classification round

Source: Goodwill Games Archive

23 July

Brazil	114–89	Spain
Scoring by half: 59–44, 55–45

Seattle Center Coliseum, Seattle

23 July

Yugoslavia	93–77	Australia
Scoring by half: 50–37, 43–40

Seattle Center Coliseum, Seattle

24 July

Spain	78–71	Australia
Scoring by half: 45–33, 33–38

Seattle Center Coliseum, Seattle

24 July

Brazil	95–85	Yugoslavia

Seattle Center Coliseum, Seattle

25 July

Brazil	101–94	Australia
Scoring by half: 60–48, 41–46

Seattle Center Coliseum, Seattle

25 July

Yugoslavia	81–67	Spain
Scoring by half: 43–31, 38–36

Seattle Center Coliseum, Seattle

=== Group B ===
Pos	Team	Pld	W	L	PF	PA	PD	Pts	Qualification
1	Soviet Union	3	2	1	264	269	−5	5	Semifinals
2	United States (H)	3	2	1	298	262	+36	5	Semifinals
3	Italy	3	1	2	278	298	−20	4	5th–8th classification round
4	Puerto Rico	3	1	2	290	301	−11	4	5th–8th classification round

Source: Goodwill Games Archive
(H) Hosts

23 July

Soviet Union	88–85	Italy

Seattle Center Coliseum, Seattle

23 July

United States	100–94	Puerto Rico
Scoring by half: 51–52, 49–42

Seattle Center Coliseum, Seattle

24 July

Soviet Union	92–85	United States

Seattle Center Coliseum, Seattle

24 July

Italy	117–97	Puerto Rico
Scoring by half: 52–47, 65–50

Seattle Center Coliseum, Seattle

25 July

Puerto Rico	99–84	Soviet Union
Scoring by half: 43–37, 56–47

Seattle Center Coliseum, Seattle

25 July

United States	113–76	Italy
Scoring by half: 49–28, 64–48

Seattle Center Coliseum, Seattle

== 5th–8th classification ==
Semifinals
Spain	74
Puerto Rico	75
Italy	78
Australia	106

5th place game
Puerto Rico	92
Australia	116
7th place game
Spain	96
Italy	105

=== Semifinals ===
28 July

Spain	74–75	Puerto Rico
Scoring by half: 35–31, 39-44

Seattle Center Coliseum, Seattle

28 July

Italy	78–106	Australia
Scoring by half: 42–49, 36–57

Seattle Center Coliseum, Seattle

=== Seventh place playoff ===
30 July

Spain	96–105	Italy

Seattle Center Coliseum, Seattle

=== Fifth place playoff ===
30 July

Puerto Rico	92–116	Australia

Seattle Center Coliseum, Seattle

== Final round ==
Semifinals
Brazil	95
United States	112
Soviet Union	78
Yugoslavia	84

Finals
United States	79
Yugoslavia	85
3rd place game
Brazil	103
Soviet Union	109

=== Semifinals ===
28 July

Report

Brazil	95–112	United States
Scoring by half: 45–58, 50–54

Seattle Center Coliseum, Seattle

28 July

Soviet Union	78–84	Yugoslavia
Scoring by half: 36–45, 42–39

Seattle Center Coliseum, Seattle

=== Third place playoff ===
30 July

Brazil	103–109	Soviet Union

Seattle Center Coliseum, Seattle

=== Final ===
30 July

Report

United States	79–85	Yugoslavia
Scoring by half: 31–34, 48–51
Pts: Owens 23		Pts: Zdovc 21

Seattle Center Coliseum, Seattle

== Final standings ==
Rank	Team	Pld	W	L	PF	PA	PD
1st place, gold medalist(s)	Yugoslavia	5	4	1	428	396	+32
2nd place, silver medalist(s)	United States	5	3	2	489	442	+47
3rd place, bronze medalist(s)	Soviet Union	5	3	2	451	456	-5
4th	Brazil	5	3	2	508	489	+19
Eliminated at the preliminary round
5th	Australia	5	2	3	464	442	+22
6th	Puerto Rico	5	2	3	457	491	-34
7th	Italy	5	2	3	461	500	-39
8th	Spain	5	1	4	404	446	-42

== Awards ==
1990 Goodwill Games Champions

Yugoslavia
First title

Team Roster:
Luka Pavićević, Velimir Perasović, Zoran Čutura, Toni Kukoč, Žarko Paspalj, Jure Zdovc, Željko Obradović, Radisav Ćurčić, Zoran Jovanović, Arijan Komazec, Dino Rađa, Zoran Savić, and Sabahudin Bilalović. Head coach: Dušan Ivković
