= Broncos de Caracas =

Venezuelan basketball team

- Leagues: Liga Profesional de Baloncesto
- Location: Caracas, Venezuela
- Head coach: Manuel Berroteran
Home	Away

Broncos de Caracas are a professional basketball team, located in Caracas, Venezuela. They compete in the Liga Profesional de Baloncesto, the highest tier of professional basketball in Venezuela.

In May 2021, the Broncos defeated Trotamundos B.B.C. 75-71 (35-41) at the start of the semifinals of the Liga Profesional de Baloncesto. A double by Luis Julio with 67 seconds left tied the score at 71. Two free throws by Garly Sojo and two by Michael Rudas sealed the game. The Broncos' leading scorer was Sojo with 15 points, six rebounds and three assists, followed by Héctor Díaz with 13 baskets and Julio with 10.

In the fifth and final game of the league's semifinals, the Broncos ceded to Trotamundos 86-59 (44-29). A noteworthy occurrence was that Broncos Caracas started the game with a 10-0 run. After the victory, Trotamundos' David Cubillán stated: «My respects to the Caracas Broncos organization, which was a great rival that complicated the series for us and made us grow as a team, since we played the first games with confidence and had to improve in many aspects to move on.»

== Notable players ==
- Set a club record or won an individual award as a professional player.
- Played at least one official international match for his senior national team at any time.

- (Venezuela) Héctor Díaz
- (Venezuela) Luis Julio
- (Venezuela) Garly Sojo
