= Basketball at the 1983 Pan American Games =

- Dates: August 15–27, 1983

The men's basketball tournament at the 1983 Pan American Games was held from August 15 to August 27, 1983 in Caracas, Venezuela.

The United States men won the gold medal after winning all eight games. They were led by a 20-year-old Michael Jordan, who averaged a team-high 17.3 points per game.

== Men's competition ==
=== Participating nations ===
Group A	Group B
Argentina; Canada; Cuba; Dominican Republic; Puerto Rico	Brazil; Mexico; United States; Venezuela

=== Final ranking ===
RANK	TEAM
1.	United States
2.	Brazil
3.	Mexico
4.	Canada
5.	Argentina
6.	Puerto Rico
7.	Cuba
8.	Venezuela
9.	Dominican Republic

=== Awards ===
1983 Pan American Games winners

United States
Eighth title

== Women's competition ==
=== Final ranking ===
RANK	TEAM
1.	United States
2.	Cuba
3.	Brazil
