= Basketball at the 1951 Pan American Games =

- Venues: Luna Park
- Start date: February 28, 1951
- End date: March 8, 1951

Medalists
Gold medal	United States
Silver medal	Argentina
Bronze medal	Brazil

The men's basketball tournament at the 1951 Pan American Games was held in the Luna Park in Buenos Aires, from February 28 to March 8, 1951.

== Participating nations ==
Argentina; Brazil; Chile; Cuba; Colombia	Ecuador; Mexico; Panama; Paraguay; United States

== Matches ==
2 March

Report

United States	77–59	Cuba

Luna Park, Buenos Aires

2 March

Report

Argentina	58–47	Brazil

Luna Park, Buenos Aires

4 March

Report

United States	90–55	Panama

Luna Park, Buenos Aires

4 March

Report

Argentina	72–56	Cuba

Luna Park, Buenos Aires

4 March

Report

Brazil	58–39	Chile

Luna Park, Buenos Aires

5 March

Report

United States	69–50	Chile
Scoring by half: 79–41

Luna Park, Buenos Aires

5 March

Report

Brazil	57–46	Cuba

Luna Park, Buenos Aires

5 March

Report

Argentina	65–54	Panama

Luna Park, Buenos Aires

6 March

Report

Cuba	73–67	Panama

Luna Park, Buenos Aires

6 March

Report

United States	74–42	Brazil

Luna Park, Buenos Aires

6 March

Report

Argentina	54–47	Chile

Luna Park, Buenos Aires

6 March

Report

Panama	70–51	Brazil

Luna Park, Buenos Aires

8 March

Report

Argentina	51–57	United States
Scoring by half: 23–29

Luna Park, Buenos Aires

== Final ranking ==
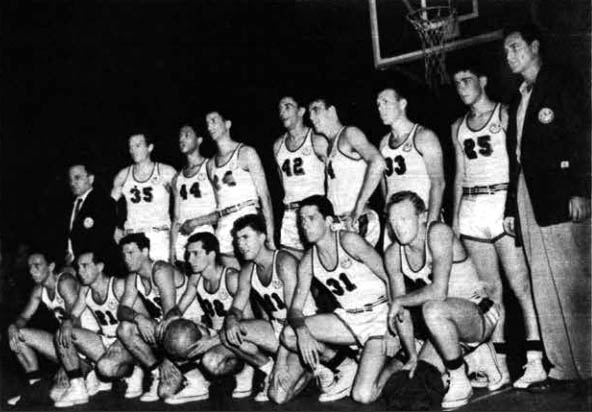
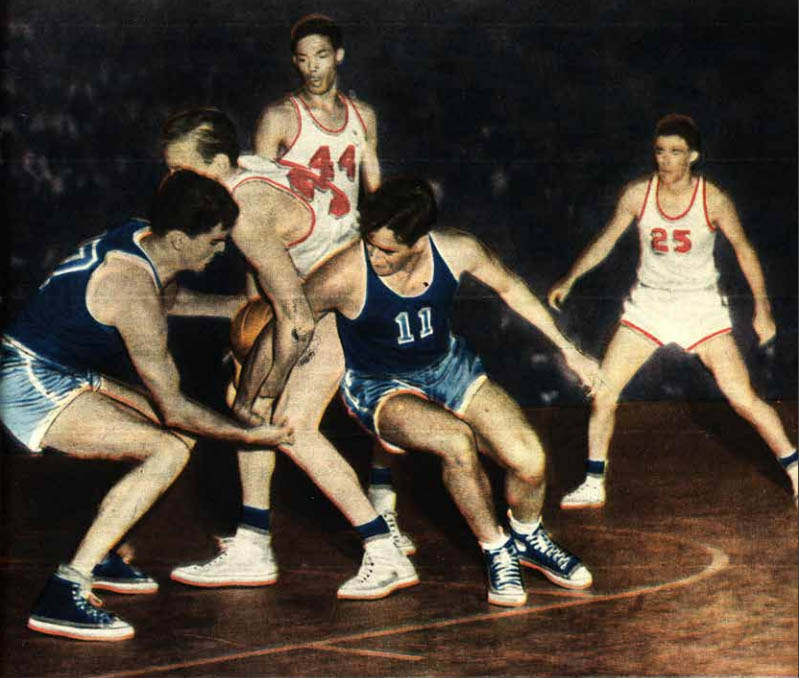
(Left): USA basketball team, gold medal; (right): A moment of the Argentina (wearing blue) v USA match

Rank.	Team
1.	United States
2.	Argentina
3.	Brazil
4.	Cuba
5.	Chile
6.	Panama
7.	Paraguay
8.	Mexico
9.	Ecuador
10.	Colombia

== Awards ==
1951 Pan American Games winners

United States
First title

== Bibliography ==
- Olderr, Steven (2009). The Pan American Games: A Statistical History, 1951-1999, bilingual edition. McFarland & Company. ISBN 0786443367. ISBN 9780786443369.
