= Iván Montano =

Mexican basketball player (born 1998)

No. 9 – Lobos de Puebla
- Position: Point guard
- League: LNBP

Personal information
- Born: 16 September 1998 (age 28) Xalapa, Veracruz, Mexico
- Listed height: 5 ft 11 in (1.80 m)
- Listed weight: 170 lb (77 kg)

Career information
- College: Universidad Popular Autónoma del Estado de Puebla
- Playing career: 2021–present

Career history
- 2021: Panteras de Aguascalientes
- 2022: Plateros de Fresnillo
- 2023: Plateros de Fresnillo
- 2024: Toros Laguna
- 2024: Piratas de Imbabura
- 2024: Panteras de Aguascalientes
- 2025: Riachuelo
- 2025: Fuerza Regia de Monterrey
- 2026–present: Dorados de Chihuahua
- 2026: Toros Laguna
- 2026–present: Lobos de Puebla

Iván Montano Macías (born 16 September 1998) is a Mexican professional basketball player for the Riachuelo of the Liga Nacional de Básquetbol, and the Mexican national team.

== Career ==
Montano made his debut in the 2021 season with the Panteras de Aguascalientes to play in the LNBP. In the season 2022 and 2023 he played with Plateros de Fresnillo. In 2024 he played with Toros Laguna. Later the same year he joined Piratas de Imbabura. In 2025 he signed with Riachuelo.

== National team career ==
Since 2023, he is member of the Mexican national team. He was part of the squad that participated in the 2024 FIBA Men's Olympic Qualifying Tournaments.
