= Basketball at the 1971 Pan American Games =

The men's basketball tournament at the 1971 Pan American Games was held from July 31 to August 12, 1971 in Cali, Colombia.

== Men's competition ==
=== Participating nations ===
Group A	Group B	Group C
Argentina; Canada; Colombia; Panama; Virgin Islands	Haiti; Mexico; Peru; Puerto Rico	Brazil; Cuba; Suriname; United States

=== Preliminary round ===
Group A	Pts	Pld	W	L	PF	PA	Diff
Argentina	8	4	4	0	347	317	+30
Panama	7	4	3	1	311	278	+33
Canada	6	4	2	2	300	275	+25
Colombia	5	4	1	3	266	318	–52
Virgin Islands	4	4	0	4	267	303	–36

Group B	Pts	Pld	W	L	PF	PA	Diff
Puerto Rico	6	3	3	0	—	—	—
Mexico	5	3	2	1	—	—	—
Peru	4	3	1	2	—	—	—
Haiti	3	3	0	3	—	—	—

Group C	Pts	Pld	W	L	PF	PA	Diff
Brazil^{†}	4	3	2	1	287	205	+82
Cuba^{†}	4	3	2	1	252	208	+44
United States	4	3	2	1	278	200	+78
Suriname	3	3	0	3	170	374	–204

†Brazil, Cuba and the United States all finished the preliminary stage with identical 2–1 records. The United States was eliminated, however, on the basis of margins of victory in head-to-head games among the teams tied for first.

=== Final ranking ===
RANK	TEAM
1.	Brazil
2.	Puerto Rico
3.	Cuba
4.	Mexico
5.	Argentina
6.	Panama
7.	United States
8.	Canada
9.	Peru
10.	Colombia
11.	Virgin Islands
12.	Haiti
13.	Suriname

=== Awards ===
1971 Pan American Games winners

Brazil
First title
