= Basketball at the 1967 Pan American Games =

The men's basketball tournament at the 1967 Pan American Games was held from July 24 to August 2, 1967 in Winnipeg, Manitoba, Canada.

== Men's competition ==
=== Participating nations ===
Group A	Group B
Colombia; Panama; Peru; Puerto Rico; United States	Argentina; Brazil; Canada; Cuba; Mexico

=== Final ranking ===
RANK	TEAM
1.	United States
2.	Mexico
3.	Panama
4.	Cuba
5.	Puerto Rico
6.	Argentina
7.	Brazil
8.	Peru
9.	Canada
10.	Colombia

=== Awards ===
1967 Pan American Games winners

United States
Fifth title
