= Garly Sojo =

Venezuelan basketball player (1999–2023)

Personal information
- Born: 23 September 1999 Caracas, Venezuela
- Died: 22 December 2023 (aged 24) Caracas, Venezuela
- Listed height: 6 ft 5 in (1.96 m)
- Listed weight: 216 lb (98 kg)

Career information
- NBA draft: 2021: undrafted
- Playing career: 2019–2023
- Position: Point guard
- Number: 6, 9, 26

Career history
- 2019–2020: Cocodrilos de Caracas
- 2020–2021: Broncos de Caracas
- 2021: Mexico City Capitanes
- 2022: Quimsa
- 2022: Broncos de Caracas
- 2022: Mexico City Capitanes
- 2023: Defensor Sporting
- 2023: Broncos de Caracas
- 2023: Gladiadores de Anzoátegui

Career highlights
- SPB Most Valuable Player (2022); SPB Ideal Quintet (2022); LPB Cup Rookie of the Year (2019)

Garly Enrique Sojo Tilvez (23 September 1999 – 22 December 2023) was a Venezuelan professional basketball player. Standing at 6 ft 5 in (1.96 m), he played the point guard position. He was a promising player in Venezuelan basketball, as he won the LPB Most Valuable Player award in 2022. Sojo played for the Venezuela national team, among others at the 2023 FIBA Basketball World Cup.

== Personal life ==
Garly Enrique Sojo Tilvez was born in Caracas on 23 September 1999. He grew up in the Caricuao district of Caracas.

Sojo died at his home in Caracas on 22 December 2023, at the age of 24, from complications following an epileptic seizure.

== Professional career ==
Sojo played for Cocodrilos de Caracas of the Liga Profesional de Baloncesto (LPB) in 2019 under the command of coach Nelson “Kako” Solórzano. There, he participated in the LPB Cup and in addition, he played for the club's team in the Liga Especial de Desarrollo (Special Development League) (LED 1). In 13 games for the club's U21 team, he posted numbers of 17.7 points, 9.2 rebounds, 2.5 assists and 1.0 block per game, finishing as 2019 LPB Cup's "Rookie of the year". The coaching staff was led by the Argentine Fernando Duró.

On 3 February 2020, at Cocodrilos Sports Park, Sojo stated that he would be absent for a few weeks to carry out procedures in Colombia due to a latent opportunity in the United States at the end of June.

On 11 November 2021, Sojo signed with the Mexico City Capitanes of the NBA G League.

On 1 March 2022, Sojo signed with Argentine club Quimsa.

Playing for the Broncos de Caracas, Sojo won the SPB Most Valuable Player award in the 2022 season. In December 2023, Sojo played for the Gladiadores de Anzoátegui in the Basketball Champions League Americas.

== National team ==
Sojo played for Venezuela's U21 National Team at the FIBA South America Under-21 Championship in Tunja, Colombia, in August 2019. In five games he averaged 17.6 points, 2.6 steals and 2.4 assists.

Sojo was also part of his country's 3 × 3 team that participated in the 2019 World Beach Games in Doha, Qatar. Sojo played for the Venezuelan national basketball team at the 2020 FIBA Men's Olympic Qualifying Tournaments – Kaunas. He represented his country at the 2023 FIBA Basketball World Cup, where he averaged 12.4 points, 4.2 rebounds and 1.2 assists per game while shooting 44.9% from the field in five games.

== Player profile ==
Sojo played both the guard and forward positions.

In early 2020, Sojo stated that his strengths were defense, steals and rebounds. He further mentioned that he needed to improve his strength as well as his long-distance shot.
