= Basketball at the 1975 Pan American Games =

Basketball at the 1975 Pan American Games was held from October 13 to October 25, 1975 in Mexico City, Mexico.

== Men's competition ==
=== Participating nations ===
Argentina; Bahamas; Brazil; Canada; Cuba	Mexico; Puerto Rico; United States; Venezuela; Virgin Islands

=== Final ranking ===
RANK	TEAM
1.	United States
2.	Puerto Rico
3.	Brazil
4.	Mexico
5.	Cuba
6.	Canada
7.	Argentina
8.	Venezuela
9.	Bahamas
10.	Virgin Islands

=== Awards ===
1975 Pan American Games winners

United States
Sixth title

== Women's competition ==
=== Participating nations ===
El Salvador; Mexico; Brazil; Canada	Cuba; Colombia; Dominican Republic; United States

=== Final ranking ===
RANK	TEAM
1.	United States
2.	Mexico
3.	Cuba
4.	Brazil
5.	Canada
6.	Colombia
7.	Dominican Republic
8.	El Salvador

=== Awards ===
1975 Pan American Games winners

United States
Fourth title
