= Basketball at the 1955 Pan American Games =

- Date: March 13–24, 1955
- Teams: 6

Medalists
Gold medal	United States
Silver medal	Argentina
Bronze medal	Brazil

The basketball tournament at the 1955 Pan American Games was held from March 13 to March 24, 1955 in Mexico City, Mexico.

== Men's competition ==
=== Participating nations ===
Argentina; Brazil; Cuba	Mexico; United States; Venezuela

=== Results ===
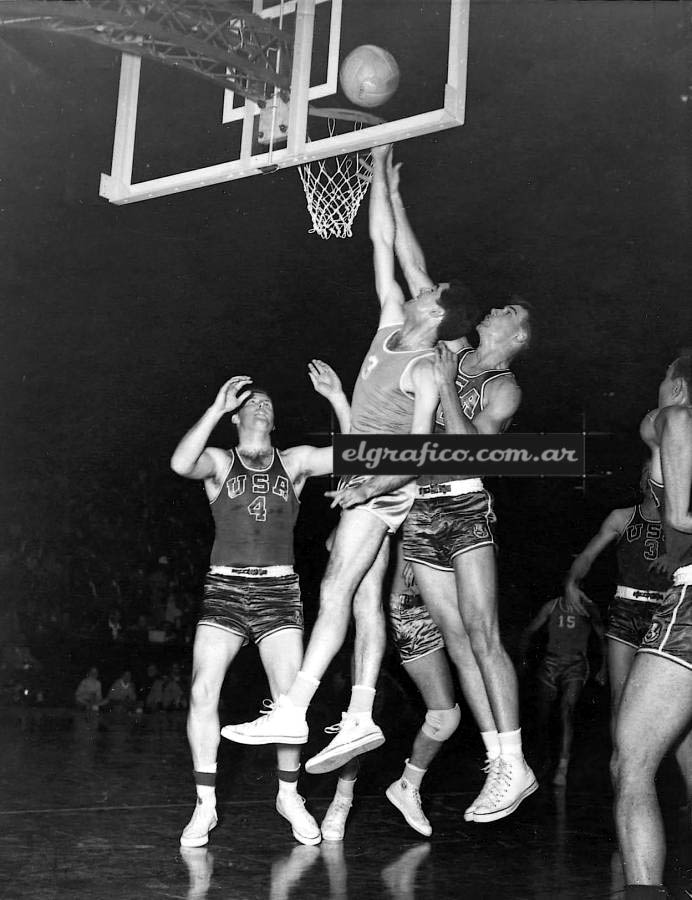
Argentina v USA match

- United States 78-49 Brazil
- United States 85-55 Mexico
- United States 84-56 Cuba
- United States 72-29 Venezuela
- Argentina 72-39 Venezuela
- Argentina 78-64 Mexico
- Argentina 54-53 United States
- Argentina 66-50 Cuba
- Brasil 86-44 Venezuela
- Brasil 95-69 Cuba
- Brasil 61-57 Argentina
- Brasil 65-59 Mexico
- Mexico 89-74 Cuba
- Mexico 93-49 Venezuela
- Cuba 86-69 Venezuela

=== Final ranking ===
RANK	TEAM
1.	United States
2.	Argentina
3.	Brazil
4.	Mexico
5.	Cuba
6.	Venezuela

=== Awards ===
1955 Pan American Games winners

United States
Second title

== Women's competition ==
=== Participating nations ===
The women's basketball team to represent the U.S. at the Second Pan American Games in March 1955 in Mexico City included Lometa Odom. The U.S. team went 8-0 and captured the gold medal.

=== Final ranking ===
1. USA 2. Argentina 3. Brazil
