= Basketball at the 1959 Pan American Games =

Basketball at the I959 Pan American Games
- Venues: Alumni Gym (men's) and Oak Park High School (women's)

The men's basketball tournament at the 1959 Pan American Games was held from August 27 to September 6, 1959 in Chicago, United States.

== Men's competition ==
=== Participating nations ===
USA

Held in Chicago, the USA hosted the Pan American Games for the first time. Coach Fred Schaus (West Virginia) and his 14-member squad marched through the competition with a 6-0 record to capture the USA’s third consecutive Pan American Games gold.

Led by then-standout collegians and future NBA legends Oscar Robertson and Jerry West, the closest any team came to the United States was 14 points when Brazil fell to the U.S. 93-79 in the final.

Brazil; Canada; Cuba; El Salvador	Mexico; Puerto Rico; United States

=== Final ranking ===
RANK	TEAM
1.	United States
2.	Puerto Rico
3.	Brazil
4.	Mexico
5.	Canada
6.	Cuba
7.	El Salvador

=== Awards ===
1959 Pan American Games winners

United States
Third title
