= Basketball at the 1963 Pan American Games =

The men's basketball tournament at the 1963 Pan American Games was held from April 23 to May 3, 1963 in São Paulo, Brazil.

== Men's competition ==
=== Participating nations ===
Brazil; Canada; Mexico; Peru	Puerto Rico; Uruguay; United States

=== Final ranking ===
RANK	TEAM
1.	United States
2.	Brazil
3.	Puerto Rico
4.	Uruguay
5.	Peru
6.	Canada
7.	Mexico

=== Awards ===
1963 Pan American Games winners

United States
Fourth title

== Women's competition ==
=== Final ranking ===
RANK	TEAM
1.	United States
2.	Brazil
3.	Chile
4.	Canada
