= Brazilian Basketball Confederation =

Governing body of basketball in Brazil

Brazil Basketball Confederation Confederação Brasileira de Basketball
- Sport: Basketball
- Jurisdiction: Brazil
- Abbreviation: CBB
- Founded: 25 October 1933; 93 years ago
- Affiliation: FIBA
- Affiliation date: FIBA: 18 June 1935; 91 years ago FIBA Americas: 11 October 1975; 51 years ago
- Regional affiliation: FIBA Americas
- Headquarters: Rio de Janeiro
- Location: Avenida Salvador Allende
- President: Guy Rodrigues Peixoto Júnior
- CEO: Ricardo Avelino Trade
- Vice president: Maria Paula Gonçalves da Silva
- Director: Marcelo Corrêa Sousa
- Secretary: Carlos Roberto da Costa Fontenelle

Official website
- www.cbb.com.br
- (Brazil)

The Brazilian Basketball Confederation (Portuguese: Confederação Brasileira de Basketball, CBB), also known as Basketball Brazil (Portuguese: Basquete Brasil), is the governing body of basketball in Brazil. The confederation represents Brazil in FIBA and FIBA Americas competitions. It organizes and oversees the Men's National Basketball Team and the Women's National Basketball Team. Since 2017, former national basketball player Guy Peixoto is the president. CBB contains 720 registered clubs, 36,000 licensed female players, 96,000 licensed male players, and 42,000 unlicensed players.

The senior men's Brazilian national basketball team, which is governed by the CBB, is currently ranked number 11 in the world by FIBA.

== History ==
The logo used from 2017 to 2025.

The CBB has been affiliated with FIBA since 1935. It previously ran the original top-tier level men's professional basketball league in Brazil, the Campeonato Brasileiro de Basquete (Brazilian Basketball Championship).

== Presidents ==
- 1934 / 1938 - Gerdal Gonzaga Boscoli
- 1938 / 1975 - Paulo Martins Meira
- 1975 / 1983 - Alberto Curi
- 1983 / 1989 - Carlos de Oliveira Dias
- 1989 / 1997 - Renato Miguel Gaia Brito Cunha
- 1997 / 2001 - Gerasime Nicolas Bozikis
- 2001 / 2005 - Gerasime Nicolas Bozikis
- 2005 / 2009 - Gerasime Nicolas Bozikis
- 2009 / 2013 - Carlos Boaventura Correa Nunes

== Olympics ==
Updated until 2024 Summer Olympics

| Year | Medal | Name | Event |
|---|---|---|---|
| 1948 | Bronze | Zeny de Azevedo; João Francisco Bráz; Ruy de Freitas; Marcus Vinícius Dias; Affonso Évora; Alexandre Gemignani; Alfredo da Motta; Alberto Marson; Nilton Pacheco; Massinet Sorcinelli | Men's Basketball |
| 1960 | Bronze | Edson Bispo dos Santos; Moysés Blás; Waldemar Blatskauskas; Algodão; Rosa Branca; Carlos Domingos Massoni; Waldyr Boccardo; Wlamir Marques; Amaury Pasos; Fernando Pereira de Freitas; Antônio Salvador Sucar; Jatyr Eduardo Schall | Men's Basketball |
| 1964 | Bronze | Amaury Antônio Pasos; Wlamir Marques; Ubiratan Pereira Maciel; Carlos Domingos Massoni; Friedrich Wilhelm Braun; Rosa Branca; Jatyr Eduardo Schall; Edson Bispo dos Santos; Antônio Salvador Sucar; Victor Mirshauswka; Sérgio de Toledo Machado; José Edvar Simões | Men's Basketball |
| 1996 | Silver | Hortência Marcari Oliva; Maria Angélica; Adriana Aparecida Santos; Leila Sobral; Maria Paula Silva; Janeth Arcain; Roseli Gustavo; Marta Sobral; Silvinha; Alessandra Santos de Oliveira; Cintia Santos; Claudia Maria Pastor | Women's tournament |
| 2000 | Bronze | Janeth Arcain; Ilisaine David; Lilian Gonçalves; Helen Luz; Silvia Luz; Claudia Neves; Alessandra Oliveira; Adriana Pinto; Adriana Santos; Cintia Santos; Kelly Santos; Marta Sobral || Women's tournament | |

== See also ==
- Brazilian Basketball Championship
