= Brazil men's national basketball team =

Men's national basketball team representing Brazil

Brazil
- FIBA ranking: 11 ▼2 (1 September 2026)
- Joined FIBA: 1935; 91 years ago
- FIBA zone: FIBA Americas
- National federation: Confederação Brasileira de Basketball (CBB)
- Coach: Aleksandar Petrovic

Olympic Games
- Appearances: 16
- Medals: Bronze: (1948, 1960, 1964)

FIBA World Cup
- Appearances: 19
- Medals: (gold) Gold: (1959, 1963); (silver) Silver: (1954, 1970); (bronze) Bronze: (1967, 1978)

FIBA AmeriCup
- Appearances: 20
- Medals: Gold: (1984, 1988, 2005, 2009, 2025); Silver: (2001, 2011, 2022); Bronze: (1989, 1992, 1995, 1997)

Pan American Games
- Appearances: 18
- Medals: Gold: (1971, 1987, 1999, 2003, 2007, 2015); Silver: (1963, 1983); Bronze: (1951, 1955, 1959, 1975, 1979, 1995, 2023)
Home	Away
Medal record
Olympic Games
Bronze medal – third place	1948 London	Team
Bronze medal – third place	1960 Rome	Team
Bronze medal – third place	1964 Tokyo	Team
FIBA World Cup
Gold medal – first place	1959 Chile
Gold medal – first place	1963 Brazil
Silver medal – second place	1954 Brazil
Silver medal – second place	1970 Yugoslavia
Bronze medal – third place	1967 Uruguay
Bronze medal – third place	1978 Philippines
FIBA AmeriCup
Gold medal – first place	1984 Brazil
Gold medal – first place	1988 Uruguay
Gold medal – first place	2005 Dominican Republic
Gold medal – first place	2009 Puerto Rico
Gold medal – first place	2025 Nicaragua
Silver medal – second place	2001 Argentina
Silver medal – second place	2011 Argentina
Silver medal – second place	2022 Brazil
Bronze medal – third place	1989 Mexico
Bronze medal – third place	1992 United States
Bronze medal – third place	1995 Argentina
Bronze medal – third place	1997 Uruguay

The Brazil national basketball team is governed by the Brazilian Basketball Confederation (Portuguese: Confederação Brasileira de Basketball), abbreviated as CBB. They have been a member of the International Federation of Basketball (FIBA), since 1935. Brazil's national basketball team remains among the most successful in the Americas. It is the only team besides the United States, that has appeared at every FIBA Basketball World Cup, since it was first held in 1950.

Throughout its history, the Brazilian national team has won two FIBA World Cup gold medals (1959 and 1963), three Summer Olympic Games bronze medals (in 1948, 1960 and 1964), five FIBA AmeriCup gold medals (1984, 1988, 2005, 2009 and 2025), and six Pan American Games gold medals (1971, 1987, 1999, 2003, 2007, and 2015).

== History ==
=== First steps ===
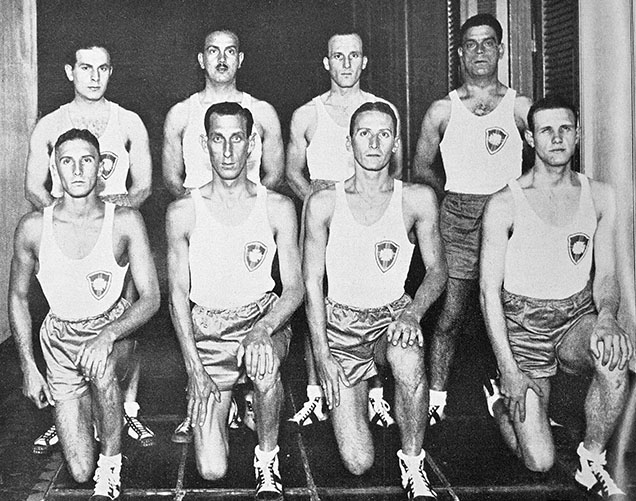
The Brazilian team that competed at the 1934 South American Championship, held in Argentina

Basketball was initially introduced to Brazil by Professor Augusto Shaw in 1896. In 1912, he began organizing the first state tournament and in 1922 the first national team made its debut at games against Argentina and Uruguay. As in the case of football, South America was initially ahead of the rest of the world and in 1930 held the first edition of the FIBA South American Championship. In that decade, Brazilian basketball was supported by professional football clubs, to include it as a new sports section, although amateur in nature. Later, these clubs became professional and supported the national team with world-class players.

=== Initial success despite budget constraints ===
In the following years, Brazil became a regular at major international competitions. Its basketball squad participated in the first official basketball tournament at the Summer Olympics 1936 in Berlin. In 1939, the first continental championship was held in Rio de Janeiro. In the 40s, basketball was catching on more layers of society and left the elitist stigma. The sport received the ultimate accolade at the 1948 Olympic Games in London. There, against all odds, the team directed by Moacyr Daiuto (1915–1994) managed to achieve the bronze medal. The team recorded six straight wins until it stopped due to the semi-final defeat to France (33–43). In the bronze medal match, Brazil beat Mexico (52–47). They managed to feature ten amateur players. The pre-Olympic Brazil concentration was very poor in resources. After its time-consuming journey to London, the team was astonishment when they saw how the U.S. team practiced: each player with a ball. Brazil only had two for the whole team.

=== The Kanela era ===
One of the fundamental pillars of Brazilian basketball was the boldness of its coaches. The "father" of them all is Togo Renan Soares, "Kanela" (so nicknamed for his thick white hair). Working in the shadow of the giant football, Kanela (1906–1992) understood that basketball would add more followers if it could only offer new emotions. He aimed to get the influential media involved, so the game was conceived as a spectacle based on its dynamism and aesthetics. The formula worked. Besides the national team, he coached Flamengo which chained ten titles Rio de Janeiro State Championships in a row (1951–1960). Born in João Pessoa, Paraíba, he also coached football, rowing and water polo. In his youth, he studied at a military college. His lengthy workouts alternated with authoritative teaching tone.

=== Rise to global dominance ===
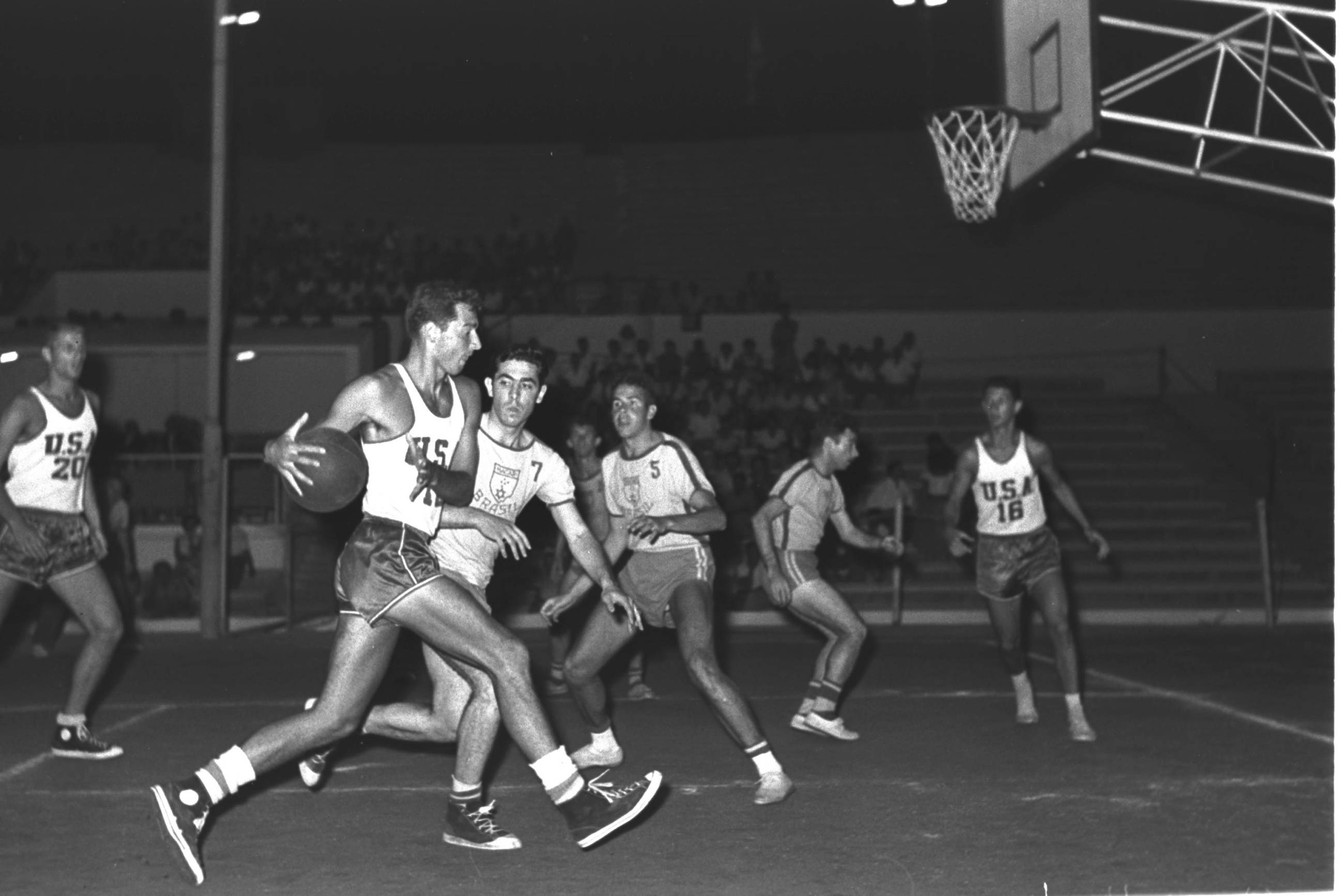
Brazil playing the United States, during the 5th Maccabiah Games, in Israel

The unstoppable rise of basketball was confirmed at the second World Championship in Rio (1954). The Brazilian team, coached by Kanela, reached the final undefeated and proclaimed runner-up after losing to the global hegemonic basketball power from the U.S. The Brazilian team was equipped with experienced players who won the bronze medal at the 1948 London Summer Olympic Games, and supported through the arrival of two young men. These young men were Amaury Pasos and Wlamir Marques, 18 and 17 years old, respectively. The bet of the visionary Kanela would give tremendous returns in later years.

Ironically, the Brazilian player leap happened when the team was made up of willing and enthusiastic amateurs. These athletes, who were initiated into the game almost self-taught by imitation of American basketball players who had toured the country. The hard work of Kanela consisted of giving these players basic fundamentals and then lecture them on team concepts. Amaury and Wlamir were his most successful students. Especially their jump shots dazzled at the 54 FIBA World Cup. "Their scoring was smart and technically perfect." said the Brazilian journalist Fábio Balassiano.

Before playing basketball, Amaury, who measured 1.91 m (6'3"), had practiced swimming, athletics and volleyball, which provided him with much athletic ability. Amaury began his career playing as a typical center and power forward, but he later learned to play away from the basket, as play maker. His partner, Wlamir, was another former track runner. Standing at 1.85 m (6'1"), Wlamir was a great shooter, had great ball handling skills, enormous agility and jumping ability, which also helped him to become an excellent rebounder. Amaury and Wlamir fit well into Kanela's system: fast pace, quick transition, and full confidence in the outside shooters.

After three months of intense preparation at a Marine base, Brazil was presented at the 1959 FIBA World Championship in Chile, as a candidate for the podium. In addition to the U.S. (with a team composed of air force players), a very tough opponent emerged that had been absent in the previous tournament: the Soviet Union, the 1957 EuroBasket champions and 1956 Summer Olympics silver medalists. Kanela had the following starting lineup: Amaury Pasos as play maker, Wlamir Marques and the 33-year old veteran Algodão as wings; and Waldemar Blatskauskas and Edson Bispo at power forward and center. To complete his 7-player rotation, Kanela mostly played his bench players, small forward Jatyr Schall and point guard Pecente Fonseca. There were some minutes also for the young forward Rosa Branca, who was a great ball handler, and who later received an offer to join the Harlem Globetrotters.

In the first phase, victories over Canada (69–52) and Mexico (78–50), and defeat against the USSR (64–73). Brazil began the final phase of the tournament by beating Taiwan (94–76) and Bulgaria (62–53). Again, the Brazilians ran into the Soviets (63–66) who imposed their academic style and the size of players like Jānis Krūmiņš (2.18 m). In that clash, Kanela showed his most irascible side by attacking a referee. After a new triumph over Puerto Rico (99–71), a diplomatic carom returned chance to for the title back to Brazil: the USSR, an ally of China, declined to play against Taiwan (at that time Formosa), thus losing the match. Brazil depended on itself and did not fail. Historic victory over the USA (81–67, with 26 points from Wlamir) and, on the last day, an exhibition against Chile (73–49). Brazil reached the top of world basketball. The charismatic Amaury and Wlamir caught up with Pelé and Garrincha.

=== Recent years ===
In 2012, Brazil's top players included: Anderson Varejão, Tiago Splitter, Leandro Barbosa, Nenê, Marcelinho Huertas, Alex Garcia, Guilherme Giovannoni, Marcelinho Machado, and Marquinhos Vieira. Brazil has four NBA players in 2021: Cristiano Felício (Chicago Bulls), Anderson Varejão (Cleaveland Cavaliers), Raulzinho Neto (Washington Wizards) and Didi Louzada (New Orleans Pelicans)

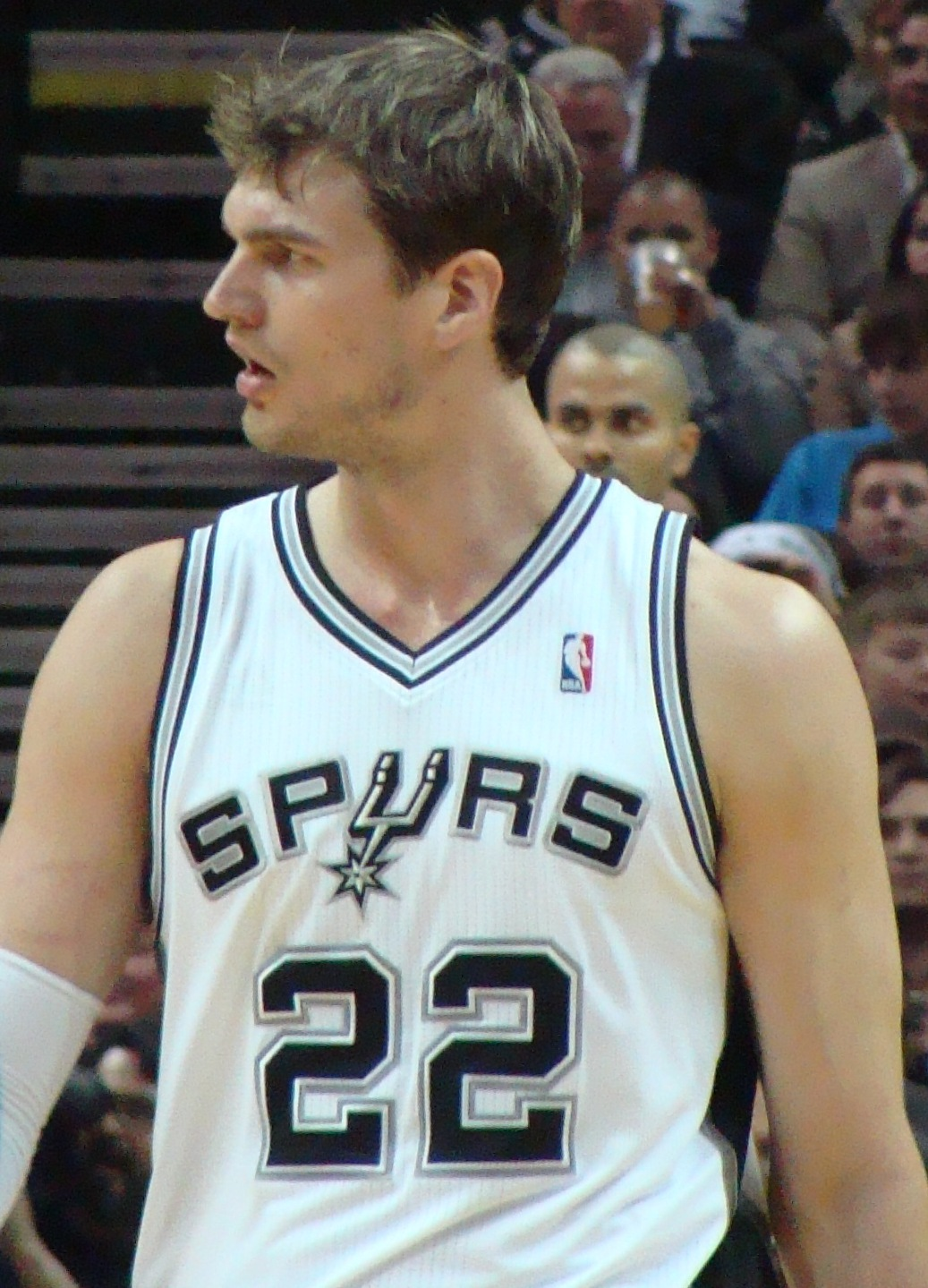
Tiago Splitter

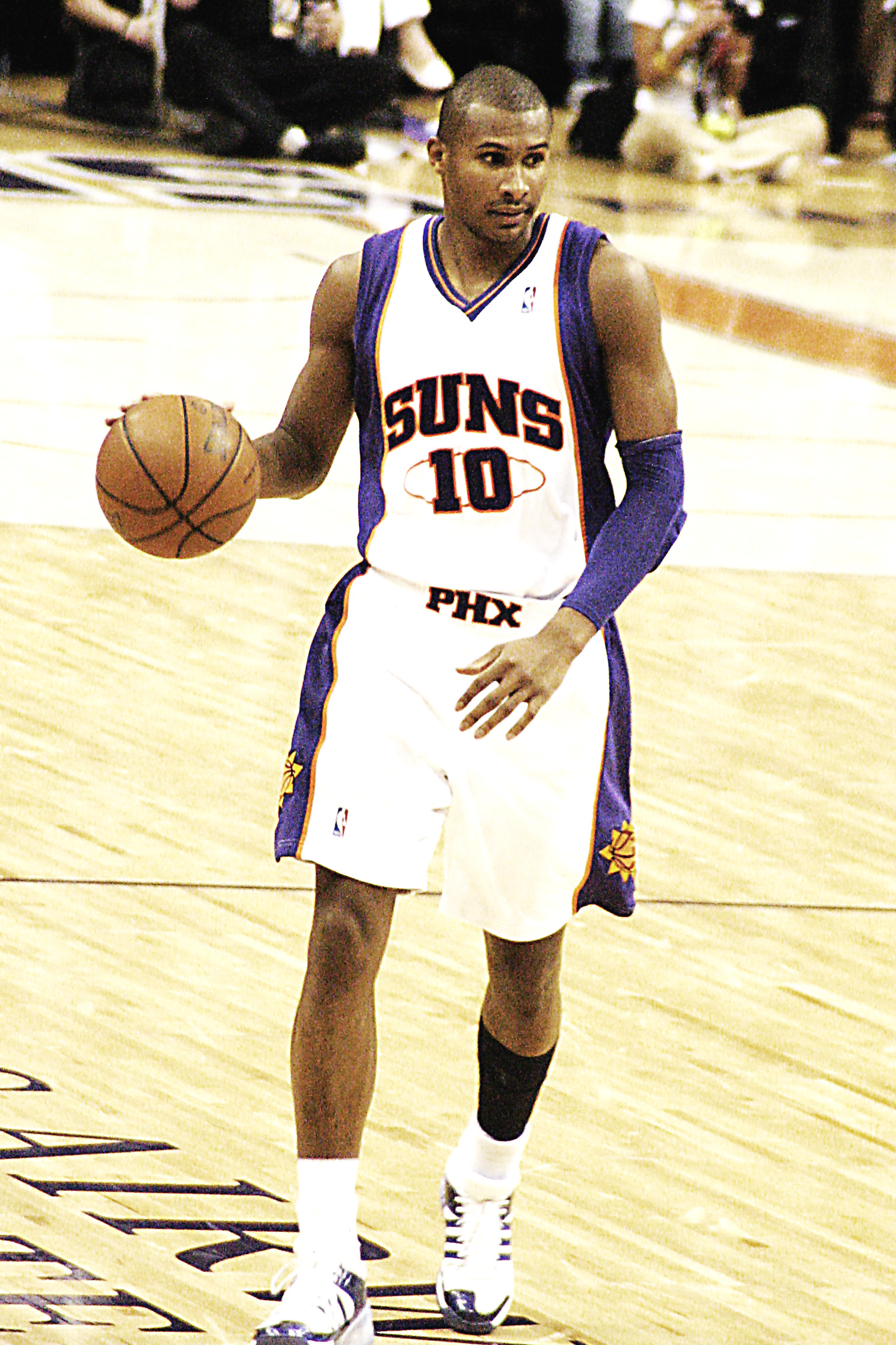
Leandro Barbosa

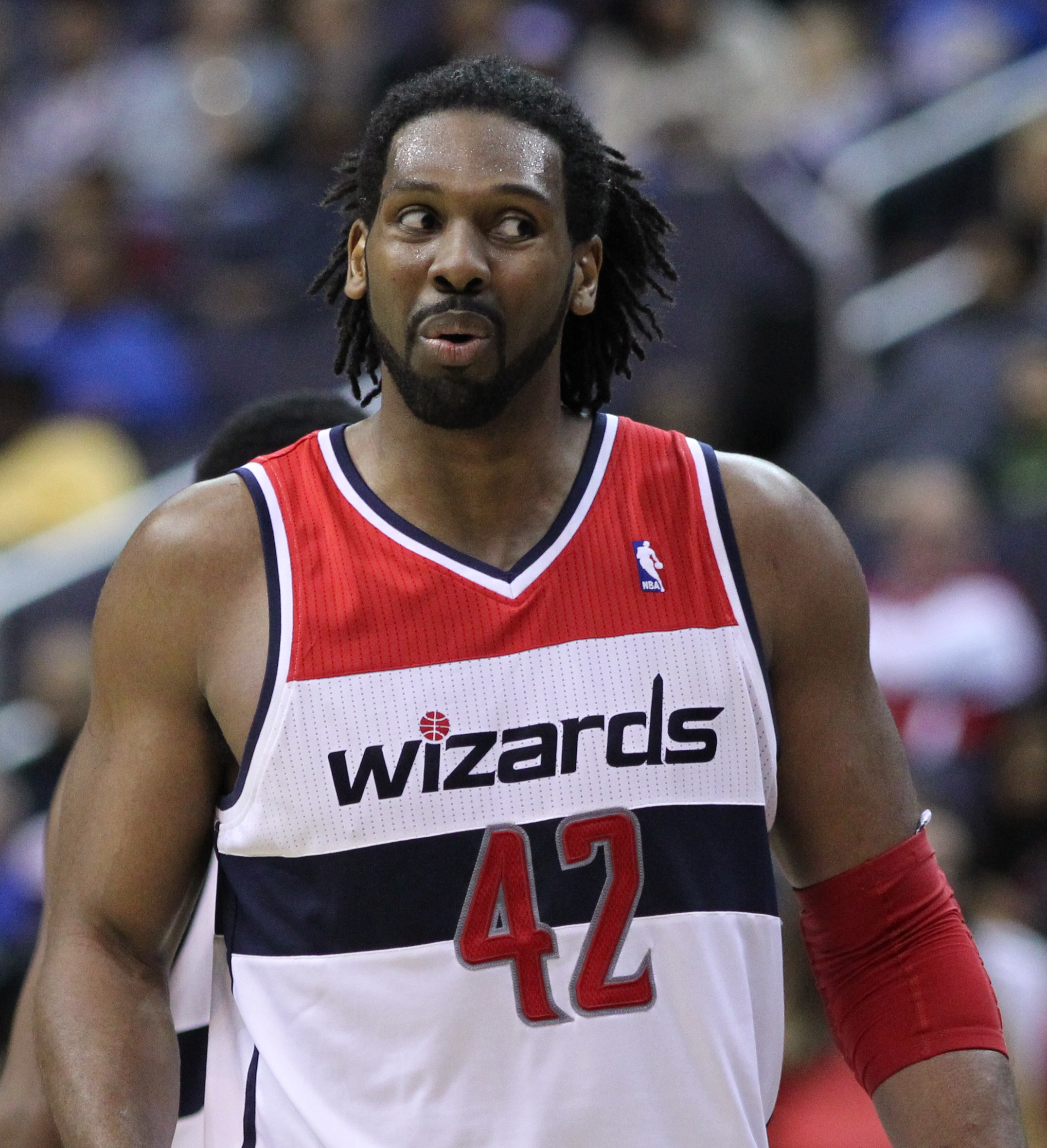
Nenê

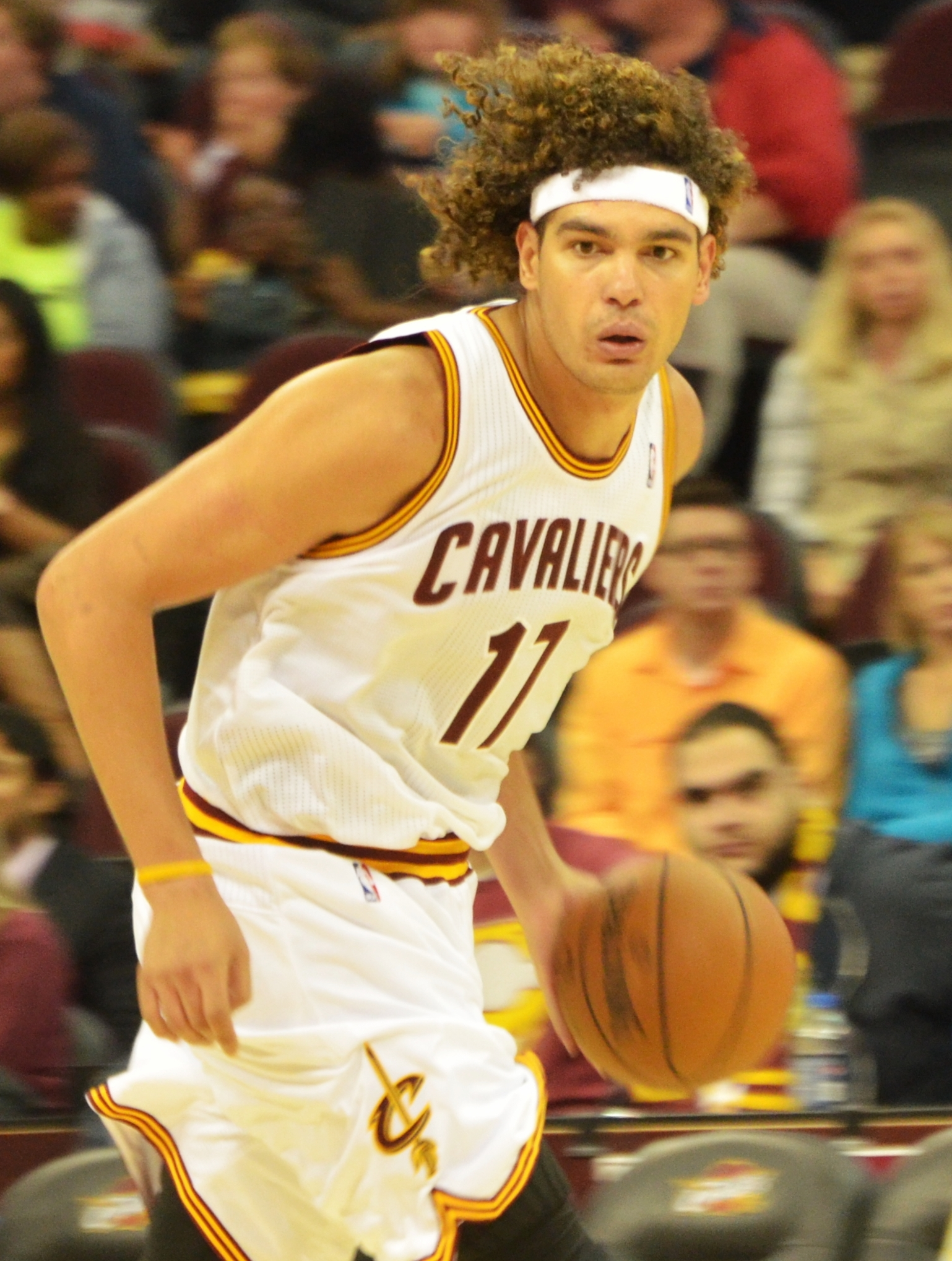
Anderson Varejão

== Competition results ==
=== Olympic Games ===
Summer Olympic Games Record
Years	Positions	Pld	W	L
(Germany) 1936	9th place	4	1	3
(United Kingdom) 1948	Bronze medal	8	7	1
(Finland) 1952	6th place	8	4	4
(Australia) 1956	6th place	7	3	4
(Italy) 1960	Bronze medal	8	6	2
(Japan) 1964	Bronze medal	9	6	3
(Mexico) 1968	4th place	9	6	3
(Germany) 1972	7th place	9	5	4
(Canada) 1976	did not qualify			
(Soviet Union) 1980	5th place	7	4	3
(United States) 1984	9th place	7	3	4
(South Korea) 1988	5th place	8	5	3
(Spain) 1992	5th place	8	4	4
(United States) 1996	6th place	8	3	5
(Australia) 2000	did not qualify			
(Greece) 2004	did not qualify			
(China) 2008	did not qualify			
(United Kingdom) 2012	5th place	6	4	2
(Brazil) 2016	9th place	5	2	3
(Japan) 2020	did not qualify			
(France) 2024	7th place	4	1	3
Total		115	66	49

=== FIBA World Cup ===
FIBA World Cup Record
Year	Result	Pld	W	L
(Argentina) 1950	4th place	6	3	3
(Brazil) 1954	Runner-up	9	8	1
(Chile) 1959	Champions	9	7	2
(Brazil) 1963	Champions	6	6	0
(Uruguay) 1967	3rd place	9	7	2
(Socialist Federal Republic of Yugoslavia) 1970	Runner-up	9	7	2
(Puerto Rico) 1974	6th place	9	4	5
(Philippines) 1978	3rd place	10	8	2
(Colombia) 1982	8th place	7	4	3
(Spain) 1986	4th place	10	6	4
(Argentina) 1990	5th place	8	4	4
(Canada) 1994	11th place	8	2	6
(Greece) 1998	10th place	8	2	6
(United States) 2002	8th place	9	4	5
(Japan) 2006	19th place	5	1	4
(Turkey) 2010	9th place	6	3	3
(Spain) 2014	6th place	7	5	2
(China) 2019	13th place	5	3	2
(Philippines) (Japan) (Indonesia) 2023	13th place	5	3	2
(Qatar) 2027	To Be Determined			
(France) 2031	To Be Determined			
Total		145	87	58

=== Pan American Games ===
Pan American Games Record
Year	Result	Pld	W	L
(Argentina) 1951	Bronze Medal	6	3	3
(Mexico) 1955	Bronze Medal	5	4	1
(United States) 1959	Bronze Medal	6	4	2
(Brazil) 1963	Silver Medal	6	5	1
(Canada) 1967	7th place	6	4	2
(Colombia) 1971	Gold Medal	8	7	1
(Mexico) 1975	Bronze Medal	9	7	2
(Puerto Rico) 1979	Bronze Medal	9	4	5
(Venezuela) 1983	Silver Medal	8	5	3
(United States) 1987	Gold Medal	7	6	1
(Cuba) 1991	5th place	7	6	1
(Argentina) 1995	Bronze Medal	7	5	2
(Canada) 1999	Gold Medal	5	4	1
(Dominican Republic) 2003	Gold Medal	5	5	0
(Brazil) 2007	Gold Medal	5	5	0
(Mexico) 2011	5th place	4	2	2
(Canada) 2015	Gold Medal	5	5	0
(Peru) 2019	did not qualify			
(Chile) 2023	Bronze Medal	5	4	1
(Peru) 2027	To be determined			
(Paraguay) 2031	To be determined			
Total		103	76	27

=== FIBA AmeriCup ===
FIBA AmeriCup Record
Year	Result	Pld	W	L
(Puerto Rico) 1980	4th place	6	4	2
(Brazil) 1984	Champions	8	8	0
(Uruguay) 1988	Champions	8	7	1
(Mexico) 1989	3rd place	8	7	1
(United States) 1992	3rd place	6	5	1
(Puerto Rico) 1993	4th place	7	4	3
(Argentina) 1995	3rd place	10	5	5
(Uruguay) 1997	3rd place	9	6	3
(Puerto Rico) 1999	6th place	8	3	5
(Argentina) 2001	Runner-up	10	7	3
(Puerto Rico) 2003	7th place	8	3	5
(Dominican Republic) 2005	Champions	10	7	3
(United States) 2007	4th place	10	5	5
(Puerto Rico) 2009	Champions	10	9	1
(Argentina) 2011	Runner-up	10	8	2
(Venezuela) 2013	9th place	4	0	4
(Mexico) 2015	9th place	4	1	3
(Argentina) (Colombia) (Uruguay) 2017	10th place	3	1	2
(Brazil) 2022	Runner-up	6	5	1
(Nicaragua) 2025	Champions	6	5	1
Total		151	100	51

=== FIBA South American Championship ===
FIBA South American Championship
Years	Positions	Pld	W	L
(Uruguay) 1930	3rd Place	6	2	4
(Argentina) 1934	4th place	6	1	5
(Brazil) 1935	Runner-up	4	2	2
(Chile) 1937	3rd place	8	3	5
(Peru) 1938	4th place	4	1	3
(Brazil) 1939	Champions	4	3	1
(Uruguay) 1940	3rd place	5	3	2
(Argentina) 1941	5th place	5	1	4
(Chile) 1942	4th place	4	2	2
(Ecuador) 1945	Champions	5	5	0
(Brazil) 1947	Runner-up	5	3	2
(Paraguay) 1949	Runner-up	5	3	2
(Uruguay) 1953	Runner-up	6	5	1
(Colombia) 1955	3rd place	8	6	2
(Chile) 1958	Champions	7	7	0
(Argentina) 1960	Champions	6	6	0
(Brazil) 1961	Champions	7	7	0
(Peru) 1963	Champions	8	7	1
(Argentina) 1966	Runner-up	7	6	1
(Paraguay) 1968	Champions	7	6	1
(Uruguay) 1969	Runner-up	6	4	2
(Uruguay) 1971	Champions	7	6	1
(Colombia) 1973	Champions	7	7	0
(Colombia) 1976	Runner-up	6	5	1
(Chile) 1977	Champions	8	8	0
(Argentina) 1979	Runner-up	6	5	1
(Uruguay) 1981	Runner-up	5	4	1
(Brazil) 1983	Champions	6	6	0
(Colombia) 1985	Champions	7	7	0
(Paraguay) 1987	3rd place	6	5	1
(Ecuador) 1989	Champions	5	5	0
(Venezuela) 1991	Runner-up	8	6	2
(Brazil) 1993	Champions	7	7	0
(Uruguay) 1995	3rd place	7	6	1
(Venezuela) 1997	4th place	7	5	2
(Argentina) 1999	Champions	6	6	0
(Chile) 2001	Runner-up	9	7	2
(Uruguay) 2003	Champions	6	6	0
(Brazil) 2004	Runner-up	6	5	1
(Venezuela) 2006	Champions	4	3	1
(Chile) 2008	4th place	6	4	2
(Colombia) 2010	Champions	5	5	0
(Argentina) 2012	4th place	5	3	2
(Venezuela) 2014	3rd place	5	3	2
(Venezuela) 2016	Runner-up	6	4	2
Total		271	211	60

== Team ==
=== Current roster ===
Roster for the 2025 FIBA AmeriCup.

Brazil men's national basketball team roster
Players
Coaches

Pos.	No.	Name	Age – Date of birth	Height	Club	Ctr.
SF	1	Guilherme Deodato	34 – 2 June 1991	1.92 m (6 ft 4 in)	Flamengo	(Brazil)
PG	2	Yago dos Santos	26 – 9 March 1999	1.78 m (5 ft 10 in)	Crvena zvezda	(Serbia)
PG	4	Alexey Borges	29 – 8 October 1995	1.88 m (6 ft 2 in)	Flamengo	(Brazil)
SG	8	Vítor Benite (C)	35 – 20 February 1990	1.90 m (6 ft 3 in)	Real Betis	(Spain)
PF	9	Lucas Dias	30 – 6 July 1995	2.07 m (6 ft 9 in)	SESI Franca	(Brazil)
PG	23	Caio Pacheco	26 – 22 February 1999	1.88 m (6 ft 2 in)	Básquet Coruña	(Spain)
SF	29	Reynan Santos	21 – 13 February 2004	1.92 m (6 ft 4 in)	Pinheiros	(Brazil)
C	30	Ruan Miranda	24 – 7 July 2001	2.03 m (6 ft 8 in)	Flamengo	(Brazil)
F	32	Georginho de Paula	29 – 24 May 1996	1.97 m (6 ft 6 in)	SESI Franca	(Brazil)
PF	43	Nathan Fernandes	21 – 16 September 2003	2.07 m (6 ft 9 in)	Athletico Paulistano	(Brazil)
F	45	Mãozinha Pereira	24 – 28 August 2000	1.98 m (6 ft 6 in)	Manisa Basket	(Turkey)
PF	51	Bruno Caboclo	29 – 21 September 1995	2.08 m (6 ft 10 in)	Hapoel Tel Aviv	(Israel)

Head coach

- (Croatia) Aleksandar Petrović

Assistant coach(es)

- (Brazil) Demétrius Conrado

Legend

- (C) Team captain
- Club – describes last
  club before the tournament
- Age – describes age
  on 22 August 2025

=== Past rosters ===
1936 Olympic Games: finished 9–14 among 23 teams

Aluízio "Baiano" Freire Ramos Accioly Neto, Américo Montanarini, Armando Albano, Ary "Pavão" dos Santos Furtado, Carmino de Pilla, Miguel Pedro, Nélson Monteiro, Waldemar "Coroa" Gonçalves (Head Coach: Arno Frank)

1948 Olympic Games: finished 3rd among 23 teams

Zenny "Algodão" de Azevedo, Ruy de Freitas, Affonso Évora, Alfredo da Motta, Marcus Vinícius, Alexandre Gemignani, Nilton Pacheco, João Francisco Bráz, Alberto Marson, Massinet Sorcinelli (Head Coach: Moacyr Brondi Daiuto)

1952 Olympic Games: finished 6th among 23 teams

Zenny "Algodão" de Azevedo, Hélio "Godinho" Marques Pereira, Tião Amorim Gimenez, Ruy de Freitas, Mayr Facci, Raymundo Carvalho dos Santos, Angelo "Angelim" Bonfietti, João Francisco Bráz, Alfredo da Motta, Almir Nelson de Almeida, Mário Jorge, Thales Monteiro, Zé Luiz (Head Coach: Manoel Pitanga)

1954 FIBA World Championship: finished 2nd among 12 teams

Amaury Pasos, Wlamir Marques, Zenny "Algodão" de Azevedo, Alfredo da Motta, Thales Monteiro, Hélio "Godinho" Marques Pereira, Ângelo "Angelim" Bonfietti, Almir Nelson de Almeida, Wilson Bombarda, Mário Jorge, Mayr Facci, José Henrique de Carli, Jamil Gedeão, Fausto Sucena Rasga Filho (Head Coach: Togo "Kanela" Renan Soares)

1956 Olympic Games: finished 6th among 15 teams

Amaury Pasos, Angelo "Angelim" Bonfietti, Edson Bispo dos Santos, Fausto Sucena Rasga Filho, Jamil Gedeão, Jorge Olivieri, Zé Luiz, Mayr Facci, Nélson Couto, Wilson Bombarda, Wlamir Marques, Zenny "Algodão" de Azevedo (Head Coach: Mário Amândio Duarte)

1959 FIBA World Championship: finished 1st among 13 teams

Amaury Pasos, Wlamir Marques, Waldemar Blatskauskas, Zenny "Algodão" de Azevedo, Edson Bispo dos Santos, Jatyr Eduardo Schall, Carmo "Rosa Branca" de Souza, Otto Nóbrega, Waldyr Geraldo Boccardo, Pedro "Pecente" Vicente da Fonseca, José "Zezinho" Maciel Senra, Fernando "Brobró" Pereira de Freitas (Head Coach: Togo "Kanela" Renan Soares)

1960 Olympic Games: finished 3rd among 16 teams

Amaury Pasos, Wlamir Marques, Waldemar Blatskauskas, Zenny "Algodão" de Azevedo, Edson Bispo dos Santos, Antônio Salvador Sucar, Carlos "Mosquito" Domingos Massoni, Carmo "Rosa Branca" de Souza, Jatyr Eduardo Schall, Moysés Blás, Waldyr Geraldo Boccardo, Fernando "Brobró" Pereira de Freitas (Head Coach: Togo "Kanela" Renan Soares)

1963 FIBA World Championship: finished 1st among 13 teams

Amaury Pasos, Bira Maciel, Wlamir Marques, Waldemar Blatskauskas, Carlos "Mosquito" Domingos Massoni, Jatyr Eduardo Schall, Carmo "Rosa Branca" de Souza, Antônio Salvador Sucar, Luiz Cláudio Menon, Friedrich "Fritz" Wilhelm Braun, Victor Mirshauswka, Benedito "Paulista" Cicero Tortelli (Head Coach: Togo "Kanela" Renan Soares)

1964 Olympic Games: finished 3rd among 16 teams

Amaury Pasos, Bira Maciel, Wlamir Marques, Edson Bispo dos Santos, Carlos "Mosquito" Domingos Massoni, Antônio Salvador Sucar, Jatyr Eduardo Schall, Carmo "Rosa Branca" de Souza, José Edvar Simões, Victor Mirshauswka, Sérgio "Macarrão" Toledo Machado, Friedrich "Fritz" Wilhelm Braun (Head Coach: Renato Brito Cunha)

1967 FIBA World Championship: finished 3rd among 13 teams

Amaury Pasos, Bira Maciel, Carlos "Mosquito" Domingos Massoni, Jatyr Eduardo Schall, Antônio Salvador Sucar, Hélio Rubens Garcia, José Edvar Simões, Sérgio "Macarrão" Toledo Machado, Luiz Cláudio Menon, José Luiz Olaio Neto, Cesar Sebba, Emil Rached (Head Coach: Togo "Kanela" Renan Soares)

1968 Olympic Games: finished 4th among 16 teams

Sérgio "Macarrão" Toledo Machado, Wlamir Marques, Bira Maciel, Celso Scarpini, Hélio Rubens Garcia, Rosa Branca, José "Joy" Aparecido, Luiz Cláudio Menon, Antônio Salvador Sucar, José Edvar Simões, Zé Geraldo, Carlos "Mosquito" Domingos Massoni (Head Coach: Renato Brito Cunha)

1970 FIBA World Championship: finished 3rd among 13 teams

José "Joy" Aparecido, Rosa Branca, Sérgio "Macarrão" Toledo Machado, José Edvar Simões, Wlamir Marques, Marquinhos Leite, Luiz Cláudio Menon, Carlos "Mosquito" Domingos Massoni, Zé Olaio, Pedro "Pedrinho" César Cardoso, Bira Maciel, Hélio Rubens Garcia (Head Coach: Togo "Kanela" Renan Soares)

1972 Olympic Games: finished 7th among 16 teams

Marquinhos Leite, Adilson Nascimento, Carlos "Mosquito" Domingos Massoni, Hélio Rubens Garcia, Zé Geraldo, José "Joy" Aparecido, Washington "Dodi" Joseph, Luiz Cláudio Menon, Radvilas Gorauskas, Fransérgio García, Bira Maciel (Head Coach: Pedro "Pedroca" Murilla Fuentes)

1974 FIBA World Championship: finished 6th among 14 teams

Bira Maciel, Carlos "Mosquito" Domingos Massoni, Marcel de Souza, Hélio Rubens Garcia, Marquinhos Leite, Adilson Nascimento, Washington "Dodi" Joseph, Zé Geraldo, Lazaro Henrique Garcia, Roberto "Robertão" José Corrêa, Milton "Carioquinha" Setrini, Luiz "Peixotinho" Carlos de Almeida Peixoto (Head Coach: Edson Bispo dos Santos)

1978 FIBA World Championship: finished 3rd among 14 teams

Oscar "Mão Santa" Schmidt, Bira Maciel, Marcel de Souza, Hélio Rubens Garcia, Marquinhos Leite, Adilson, Milton "Carioquinha" Setrini Júnior, Roberto "Robertão" José Corrêa, Gilson Trindade de Jesus, Eduardo Agra, Marcelo Vido, Fausto Giannechini (Head Coach: Ary Ventura Vidal)

1980 Olympic Games: finished 5th among 12 teams

André Ernesto Stoffel, Marcel de Souza, Marcelo Vido, Milton "Carioquinha" Setrini, Oscar "Mão Santa" Schmidt, Adilson Nascimento, Gilson Trinidade de Jesus, José Carlos Saiani, Marquinhos Leite, Ricardo "Cadum" Cardoso Guimarães, Wagner da Silva (Head Coach: Cláudio Mortari)

1982 FIBA World Championship: finished 8th among 13 teams

Nilo Martins Guimarães, Ricardo "Cadum" Cardoso Guimarães, André Ernesto Stoffel, Milton "Carioquinha" Setrini, Maury de Souza, Marquinhos Leite, Gilson Trinidade de Jesus, Marcel, Adilson Nascimento, Marcelo Vido, Oscar "Mão Santa" Schmidt, Israel Andrade (Head Coach: José Edvar Simões)

1984 Olympic Games: finished 9th among 12 teams

Gerson Victalino, Israel Andrade, Marcel de Souza, Marcelo Vido, Milton "Carioquinha" Setrini, Oscar "Mão Santa" Schmidt, Sílvio Malvezi, Adilson Nascimento, Eduardo Agra, Marquinhos Leite, Nilo Martins Guimarães, Ricardo "Cadum" Cardoso Guimarães (Head Coach: Renato Brito Cunha)

1986 FIBA World Championship: finished 4th among 24 teams

Nilo Martins Guimarães, Maury de Souza, Gerson Victalino, João "Pipoka" Vianna, Rolando Ferreira, Paulinho Villas Boas, Jorge "Guerrinha" Guerra, Marcel de Souza, Marcelo Vido, Sílvio Malvezi, Oscar "Mão Santa" Schmidt, Israel Andrade (Head Coach: Ary Ventura Vidal)

1988 Olympic Games: finished 5th among 12 teams

Gerson Victalino, Israel Andrade, João "Pipoka" Vianna, Jorge "Guerrinha" Guerra, Luiz Felipe, Marcel de Souza, Maury de Souza, Ricardo "Cadum" Cardoso Guimarães, Oscar "Mão Santa" Schmidt, Paulinho Villas Boas, Giant da Silva, Rolando Ferreira (Head Coach: Ary Ventura Vidal)

1990 FIBA World Championship: finished 5th among 16 teams

Luiz Felipe, Israel Andrade, Oscar "Mão Santa" Schmidt, Gerson Victalino, Fernando Minuci, Jorge "Guerrinha" Guerra, Ricardo "Cadum" Cardoso Guimarães, Aristides Josuel dos Santos, Marcel de Souza, Maury de Souza, João "Pipoka" Vianna, Rolando Ferreira (Head Coach: Hélio Rubens Garcia)

1992 Olympic Games: finished 5th among 12 teams

Aristides Josuel dos Santos, Gerson Victalino, Israel Andrade, João "Pipoka" Vianna, Jorge "Guerrinha" Guerra, Marcel de Souza, Maury de Souza, Oscar "Mão Santa" Schmidt, Paulinho Villas Boas, Rolando Ferreira, Fernando Minuci, Ricardo "Cadum" Cardoso Guimarães (Head Coach: José Medalha)

1994 FIBA World Championship: finished 11th among 16 teams

Paulinho Villas Boas, João "Pipoka" Vianna, Márcio Faria de Azevedo, Maury de Souza, Aristides Josuel dos Santos, Joélcio "Janjão" Joerke, Fernando Minuci, Rolando Ferreira, André "Ratto" Luís Guimarães Fonseca, Rogério Klafke, Carlos "Olívia" Henrique Rodrigues do Nascimento, Antônio "Tonico" José Nogueira Santana (Head Coach: Ênio Ângelo Vecchi)

1996 Olympic Games: finished 6th among 12 teams

Demétrius Conrado Ferraciú, André "Ratto" Luís Guimarães Fonseca, Caio Eduardo de Mello Cazziolato, João "Pipoka" Vianna, Carlos "Olívia" Henrique Rodrigues do Nascimento, Caio da Silveira, Antônio "Tonico" José Nogueira Santana, Fernando Minucci, Aristides Josuel dos Santos, Rogério Klafke, Oscar "Mão Santa" Schmidt, Joélcio "Janjão" Joerke (Head Coach: Ary Ventura Vidal)

1998 FIBA World Championship: finished 10th among 16 teams

Marcelinho Machado, André "Ratto" Luís Guimarães Fonseca, Caio Eduardo de Mello Cazziolato, João "Pipoka" Vianna, Sandro França Varejão, Demétrius Conrado Ferraciú, Hélio "Helinho" Rubens Garcia Filho, Marco "Chuí" Aurelio Pegolo dos Santos, Aristides Josuel dos Santos, Claudio Antonio Gomes Clemente, Rogério Klafke, Joélcio "Janjão" Joerke (Head Coach: Hélio Rubens Garcia)

2002 FIBA World Championship: finished 8th among 16 teams

Marcelinho Machado, Alex Garcia, Vanderlei Mazzuchini, Tiago Splitter, Sandro França Varejão, Demétrius Conrado Ferraciú, Hélio "Helinho" Rubens Garcia Filho, Anderson Varejão, Guilherme Giovannoni, Leandro "Leandrinho" Barbosa, Rogério Klafke, Rafael "Bábby" Araújo (Head Coach: Hélio Rubens Garcia)

2006 FIBA World Championship: finished 19th among 24 teams

Marcelinho Machado, Nezinho dos Santos, Murilo Becker, Estevam Ferreira, Leandro "Leandrinho" Barbosa, Marcelinho Huertas, Alex Garcia, Anderson Varejão, Guilherme Giovannoni, Caio Torres, Andre Bambú, Tiago Splitter (Head Coach: Lula Ferreira)

2007 FIBA Americas Championship: finished 4th among 10 teams

Marcelinho Machado, Nezinho dos Santos, Murilo Becker, Marcelinho Huertas, Alex Garcia, Valtinho da Silva, Leandro "Leandrinho" Barbosa, J. P. Batista, Guilherme Giovannoni, Nenê, Marquinhos Vieira, Tiago Splitter (Head Coach: Lula Ferreira)

2009 FIBA Americas Championship: finished 1st among 10 teams

4 – Marcelinho Machado, 5 – Duda Machado, 6 – Diego Pinheiro, 7 – Carlos Olivinha, 8 – Alex Garcia, 9 – Marcelinho Huertas, 10 – Leandrinho Barbosa, 11 – Anderson Varejão, 12 – Guilherme Giovannoni, 13 – J. P. Batista, 14 – Jonathan Tavernari, 15 – Tiago Splitter (Head Coach: Moncho Monsalve)

2010 FIBA World Championship: finished 9th among 24 teams

Marcelinho Machado, Nezinho dos Santos, Murilo Becker, Raul "Raulzinho" Neto, Alex Garcia, Marcelinho Huertas, Leandro "Leandrinho" Barbosa, Anderson Varejão, Guilherme Giovannoni, J. P. Batista, Marquinhos Vieira, Tiago Splitter (Head Coach: Rubén Magnano)

2011 FIBA Americas Championship: finished 2nd among 10 teams

4 – Marcelinho Machado, 5 – Nezinho dos Santos, 6 – Rafa Luz, 7 – Augusto Lima, 8 – Vítor Benite, 9 – Marcelinho Huertas, 10 – Alex Garcia, 11 – Rafa Hettsheimeir, 12 – Guilherme Giovannoni, 13 – Caio Torres, 14 – Marquinhos Vieira, 15 – Tiago Splitter (Head Coach: Rubén Magnano)

2012 Olympic Games: finished 5th among 12 teams

4 – Marcelinho Machado, 5 – Raul "Raulzinho" Neto, 6 – Caio Torres, 7 – Larry Taylor, 8 – Alex Garcia, 9 – Marcelinho Huertas, 10 – Leandro "Leandrinho" Barbosa, 11 – Anderson Varejão, 12 – Guilherme Giovannoni, 13 – Nenê, 14 – Marquinhos Vieira, 15 – Tiago Splitter (Head Coach: Rubén Magnano)

2013 FIBA Americas Championship: finished 9th among 10 teams

Arthur Luiz Belchior Silva, Rafa Luz, Raul "Raulzinho" Neto, Larry Taylor, Vítor Benite, Marcelinho Huertas, Alex Garcia, Rafa Hettsheimeir, Guilherme Giovannoni, Caio Torres, Cristiano Felício, J. P. Batista (Head Coach: Rubén Magnano)

2014 FIBA World Cup: finished 6th among 24 teams

4 – Marcelinho Machado, 5 – Raul "Raulzinho" Neto, 6 – Rafa Hettsheimeir, 7 – Larry Taylor, 8 – Alex Garcia, 9 – Marcelinho Huertas, 10 – Leandro "Leandrinho" Barbosa, 11 – Anderson Varejão, 12 – Guilherme Giovannoni, 13 – Nenê, 14 – Marquinhos Vieira, 15 – Tiago Splitter (Head Coach: Rubén Magnano)

2015 FIBA Americas Championship: finished 9th among 10 teams

Ricardo Fischer, Rafa Luz, Augusto Lima, Deryk Ramos, Vítor Benite, Léonardo Meindl, Carlos Olivinha, Rafa Mineiro, Guilherme Giovannoni, J. P. Batista, Marquinhos Vieira, Marcus Toledo (Head Coach: Rubén Magnano)

2016 Olympic Games: finished 9th among 12 teams

Raul Neto, Cristiano Felício, Vítor Benite, Alex Garcia, Marcelinho Huertas, Guilherme Giovannoni, Nenê, Rafael Hettsheimeir, Marquinhos Vieira, Leandro Barbosa, Augusto Lima, Rafa Luz (Head Coach: Rubén Magnano)

2017 FIBA AmeriCup: finished 9th among 10 teams

Davi Rossetto, Bruno Caboclo, Lucas Dias, Lucas Mariano, Danilo Siqueira, Renan Lenz, Fúlvio de Assis, Rafa Mineiro, J. P. Batista, Léonardo Meindl, Jimmy de Oliveira, Georginho de Paula (Head Coach: César Guidetti)

2019 FIBA World Cup: finished 13th among 32 teams. The final roster was announced on 18 August 2019.

2019 FIBA World Cup roster

Brazil national basketball team – 2019 FIBA Basketball World Cup roster
Players
Coaches

Pos.	No.	Name	Age – Date of birth	Height	Club	Ctr.
PG	2	Yago dos Santos	20 – 9 March 1999	1.78 m (5 ft 10 in)	Paulistano	(Brazil)
PG	5	Rafa Luz	27 – 11 February 1992	1.88 m (6 ft 2 in)	UCAM Murcia	(Spain)
PF	6	Cristiano Felício	27 – 7 July 1992	2.08 m (6 ft 10 in)	Chicago Bulls	(United States)
SG	8	Vítor Benite	29 – 20 February 1990	1.91 m (6 ft 3 in)	San Pablo Burgos	(Spain)
PG	9	Marcelo Huertas	36 – 25 May 1983	1.91 m (6 ft 3 in)	Iberostar Tenerife	(Spain)
SF	10	Alex Garcia	39 – 4 March 1980	1.93 m (6 ft 4 in)	Minas	(Brazil)
C	11	Anderson Varejão	36 – 28 September 1982	2.11 m (6 ft 11 in)	Flamengo	(Brazil)
PF	14	Marquinhos Vieira	35 – 31 May 1984	2.06 m (6 ft 9 in)	Flamengo	(Brazil)
SG	19	Leandro Barbosa	36 – 28 November 1982	1.91 m (6 ft 3 in)	Minas	(Brazil)
C	23	Augusto Lima	27 – 17 September 1991	2.08 m (6 ft 10 in)	San Pablo Burgos	(Spain)
SF	24	Didi Louzada	20 – 2 July 1999	1.95 m (6 ft 5 in)	Sydney Kings	(Australia)
PF	50	Bruno Caboclo	23 – 20 September 1995	2.06 m (6 ft 9 in)	Memphis Grizzlies	(United States)

Head coach

- (Croatia) Aleksandar Petrović

Assistant coach(es)

- (Brazil) Cesar Guidetti
- (Brazil) Bruno Savignani

Legend

- (C) Team captain
- Club – describes last
  club before the tournament
- Age – describes age
  on 31 August 2019

=== Head coaches ===
- (Brazil) Fred Charles Brown: 1930
- (Brazil) Ângelo Mônaco: 1934, 1940
- (Brazil) Arthur Silva Araújo: 1935
- (Brazil) Arno Frank: 1936, 1939
- (Brazil) Jayme da Costa Chacon: 1937–1938
- (Brazil) José Vaz: 1941
- (Brazil) Octacílio de Souza Braga: 1942–1947
- (Brazil) Moacyr Brondi Daiuto: 1948, 1950
- (Brazil) José Simões Henriques: 1949, 1953, 1955
- (Brazil) Togo "Kanela" Renan Soares: 1951, 1954, 1957–63, 1967, 1970–71
- (Brazil) Manoel Pitanga: 1952
- (Brazil) Ruy de Freitas: 1955
- (Brazil) Mário Amândio Duarte: 1956
- (Brazil) Renato Brito Cunha: 1964–1965, 1968, 1983–84
- (Brazil) Ary Ventura Vidal: 1966, 1977–79, 1985–88, 1995–96
- (Brazil) Édson Bispo: 1967, 1971–76
- (Brazil) José Fernandes Tude Sobrinho: 1969
- (Brazil) Pedro "Pedroca" Murilla Fuentes: 1972
- (Brazil) Cláudio Mortari: 1980–81
- (Brazil) José Edvar Simões: 1982–83
- (Brazil) Hélio Rubens Garcia: 1989–1990, 1997–2002
- (Brazil) José Medalha: 1991–92
- (Brazil) Ênio Ângelo Vecchi: 1993–94
- (Brazil) Lula Ferreira: 2003–2007
- (Spain) Moncho Monsalve: 2008–2010
- (Brazil) Paulo Teixeira Sampaio: 2008
- (Brazil) João Marcelo Leite: 2010
- (Argentina) / (Italy) Rubén Magnano: 2010–2016
- (Brazil) Gustavo Conti: 2012, 2016
- (Brazil) José Neto: 2014
- (Brazil) César Guidetti: 2017
- (Croatia) Aleksandar Petrović: 2017–2021, 2024–present

== Kit ==
=== Manufacturer ===
2010–: Nike

=== Sponsor ===
2015–2016: Bradesco
2017–: Motorola
2019–: Cimed
2019–: BRB 2020-aidas

== See also ==
- Brazil men's national 3x3 team
- Brazil national under-19 basketball team
- Brazil national under-17 basketball team
- Brazil women's national basketball team
