= SE Palmeiras (basketball) =

Brazilian basketball club

Palmeiras
- Nickname: Verdão
- Leagues: NBB
- Founded: 1914; 111 years ago (parent athletic club); 1923; 102 years ago (basketball club)
- Arena: Ginásio Palestra Itália
- Capacity: 1,500
- Location: São Paulo, SP, Brazil
- Team colors: White and Green
- President: (Brazil) Maurício Galiotte
- Championships: 1 Brazilian Championship
- Website: palmeiras.com.br
Home	Away

Sociedade Esportiva Palmeiras, abbreviated as S.E. Palmeiras, and also commonly known as Palmeiras Basquete, is a Brazilian men's professional basketball club that is based in São Paulo, Brazil. It is a part of the multi-sports club Sociedade Esportiva Palmeiras. The club competes in the top-tier level Brazilian League.

== History ==
The basketball department of Sociedade Esportiva Palmeiras was founded in 1923 by pioneers Nicolino Spina and Estevam J. Stratta. Their vision and leadership were instrumental in the growth of the sport, both within the club and across Brazil, during the early 1920s.

Basketball became the second team sport introduced at Palmeiras, following football, which was already well-established and highly regarded in the Brazilian sports scene.

On April 24, 1924, Palmeiras—then known as Palestra Itália—joined forces with CA Paulistano, Espéria, the Young Men's Christian Association (YMCA), and the São Paulo Athletic Association to form the São Paulo Basketball Federation, aiming to organize the first interclub competitions.

In November 1925, Oscar Paolillo and Estevam Stratta became the first Palestra Itália athletes to represent the São Paulo Basketball Team in a friendly match.

In its early years, Palmeiras established itself as the dominant force in São Paulo basketball, securing seven state titles in just eight years of competition. This success played a key role in the growth and development of the sport during the 1920s and 1930s.

In 1934, the Palmeiras men's basketball team earned the honor of representing Brazil at the South American Championship in Buenos Aires, Argentina, where they secured a respectable third place. The following year, they represented Brazil again at the South American Championship in Rio de Janeiro, cementing Palmeiras as one of the few clubs in the country to achieve such an international distinction.

During this golden era, a popular phrase emerged among Palmeiras fans: “It’s with the foot, it’s with the hand, Palestra is Champion!” This reflected the club's dominance in both football and basketball, as they triumphed in numerous competitions across the two sports.

However, during the 1940s, the outbreak of World War II forced significant changes at Palmeiras. The club's leadership, under pressure from government policies, had to scale back its commitment to amateur sports, including basketball. While this period hindered the sport's progress, it did not extinguish the passion of the club’s supporters.

Palmeiras made its return to the top levels of basketball in the late 1950s and early 1960s, thanks to the dedicated efforts of its management. The team remained competitive and achieved significant success through the early 1980s, winning major titles and producing several nationally acclaimed athletes.

From the 1980s onward, economic changes in Brazil, along with limited private sector support for sports, prompted a shift in Palmeiras’ basketball strategy. The club focused on developing talent through its youth categories, with the goal of nurturing future stars of the sport.

Today, the Palmeiras men’s basketball team competes in both the Campeonato Paulista and the Novo Basquete Brasil (NBB).

== Honors and titles ==
=== Continental ===
- South American Club Championship
  - Runners-up (1): 1977

=== National ===
- Brazilian Championship
  - Champions (1): 1977
  - Runners-up (2): 1975, 1978

=== Inter-regional ===
- Copa Brasil Sudeste
  - Champions (1): 2012

=== Regional ===
- São Paulo State Championship
  - Champions (8): 1932, 1933, 1934, 1958, 1961, 1963, 1972, 1974
  - Runners-up (5): 1960, 1962, 1965, 1975, 1976
- Campeonato Paulista A2
  - Champions (1): 2011

== Players ==
=== Roster ===
Note: Flags indicate national team eligibility at FIBA-sanctioned events. Players may hold other non-FIBA nationalities not displayed.

Palmeiras roster
Players
Coaches

Pos.	No.	Nat.	Name	Ht.
G	4	(Brazil)	de Lima, Lucas	1.85 m (6 ft 1 in)
F	5	(Brazil)	Pinheiro, Diego	1.95 m (6 ft 5 in)
F	7	(Brazil)	Santos, Jhonatan	1.98 m (6 ft 6 in)
G/F	8	(Brazil)	Marone, André	1.93 m (6 ft 4 in)
G	9	(Brazil)	da Silva, Murilo	1.78 m (5 ft 10 in)
F/C	10	(Brazil)	de Oliveira, Fabricio	2.00 m (6 ft 7 in)
C	13	(Brazil)	Nunes, Douglas	2.10 m (6 ft 11 in)
G	14	(Brazil)	Neto, Arlindo	1.86 m (6 ft 1 in)
F/C	15	(Brazil)	Cicotti, Ítalo	1.96 m (6 ft 5 in)
F	21	(Brazil)	Egon, Vitor	1.90 m (6 ft 3 in)
G	22	(Argentina)	Stanic, Maximiliano	1.78 m (5 ft 10 in)
G	23	(Brazil)	Avelino, Lucas	1.90 m (6 ft 3 in)
G/F	25	(Argentina)	Gianella, Nicolás	1.87 m (6 ft 2 in)
C	26	(Brazil)	Sales, Douglas	2.04 m (6 ft 8 in)
F/C	28	(Brazil)	Costa, Cadu	1.93 m (6 ft 4 in)
C	42	(United States)	Toyloy, Steven	2.03 m (6 ft 8 in)
C	44	(Brazil)	Reis Silva, Rodrigo	2.06 m (6 ft 9 in)
C	71	(Brazil)	dos Santos, Átila	2.08 m (6 ft 10 in)

Head coach

- (Brazil) Régis Marrelli

Assistant coach(es)

- (Brazil) Felipe Santana
- (Brazil) Adagoberto Aguiar

Legend

- (C) Team captain
- Injured

- Roster
Updated: 2014-12-10

== Notable players ==
Note: Flags indicate national team eligibility at FIBA-sanctioned events. Players may hold other non-FIBA nationalities not displayed.

Criteria

To appear in this section a player must have either:

- Set a club record or won an individual award while at the club
- Played at least one official international match for their national team at any time
- Played at least one official NBA match at any time.

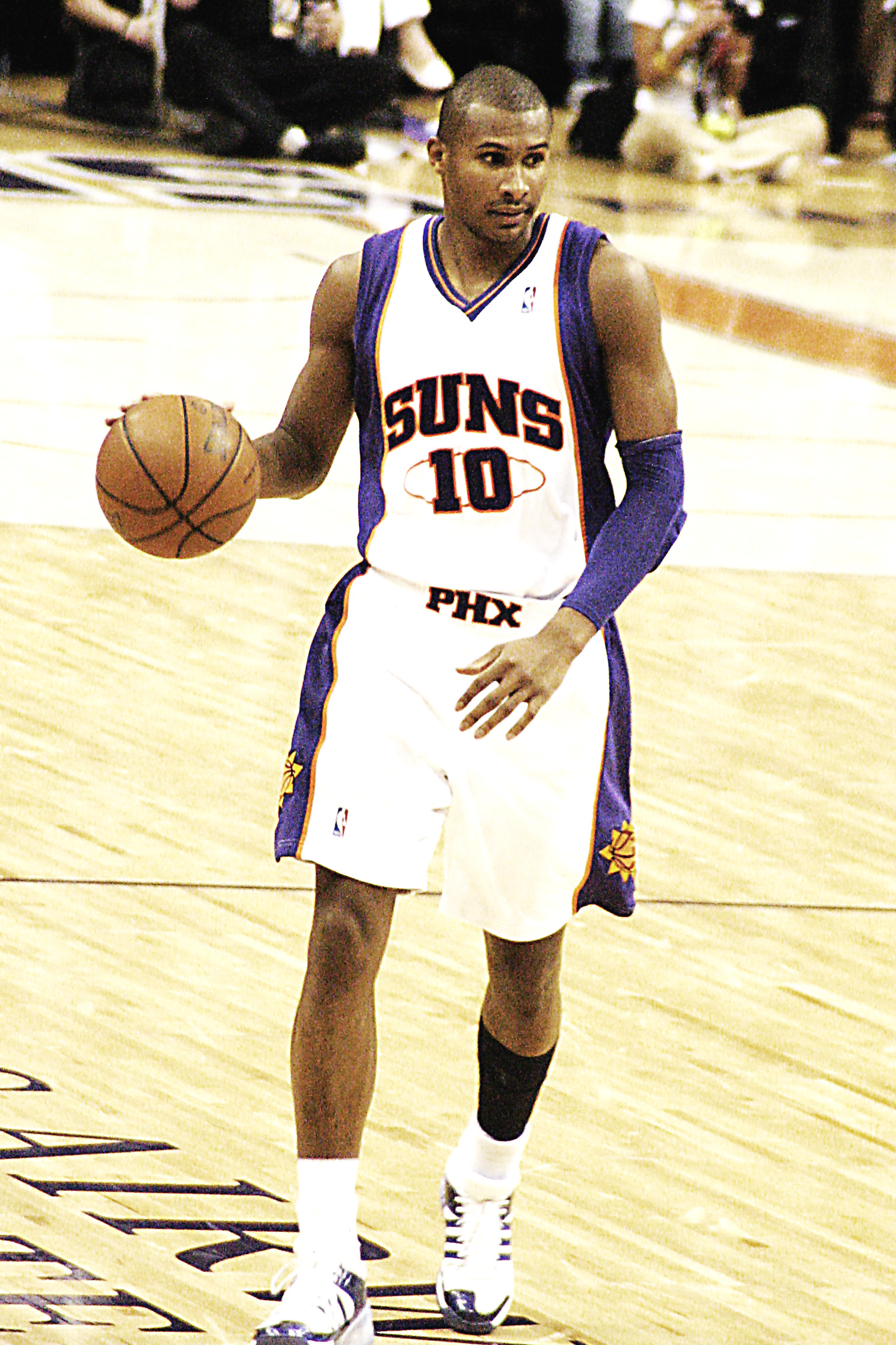
Leandrinho Barbosa

Bira Maciel

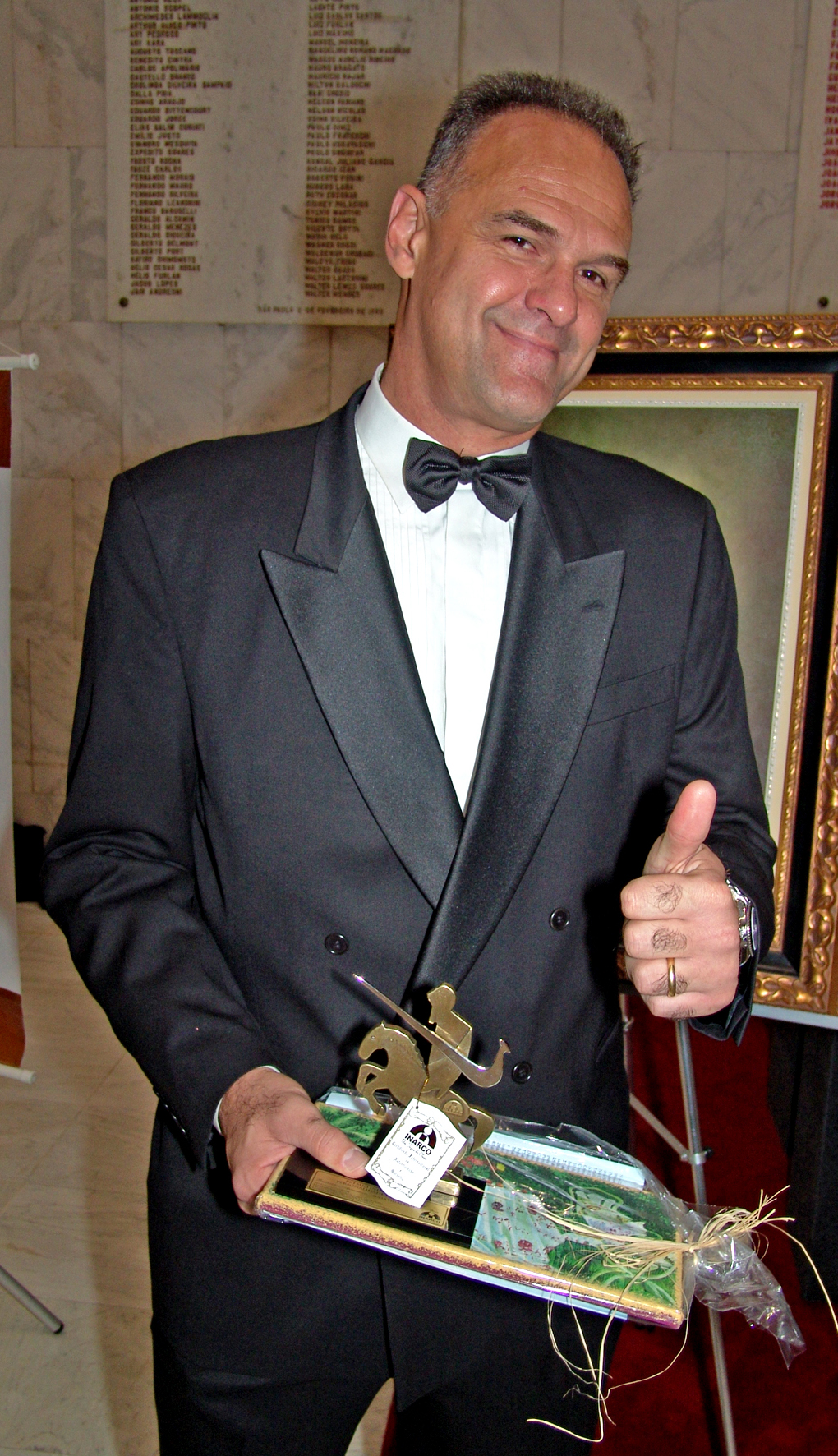
Oscar Schmidt
- (Brazil) Emil Assad Rached
- (Brazil) Leandrinho Barbosa
- (Brazil) Edson Bispo
- (Brazil) Rosa Branca
- (Brazil) Zé Geraldo
- (Brazil) Ricardo Cardoso Guimarães
- (Brazil) Gilson Trinidade de Jesus
- (Brazil) Washington Joseph
- (Brazil) Marcel de Souza
- (Brazil) Carlos Domingos Massoni
- (Brazil) Bira Maciel
- (Brazil) Luiz Cláudio Menon
- (Brazil) Cláudio Mortari
- (Brazil) Adilson Nascimento
- (Brazil) Diego Pinheiro
- (Brazil) Jatyr Eduardo Schall
- (Brazil) Oscar Schmidt
- (Brazil) Edvar Simões
- (Brazil) Milton Setrini
- (Brazil) João Vianna
- (Brazil) Paulinho Villas Boas
- (Argentina) Nicolás Gianella
- (Argentina) Maxi Stanic

== Notable coaches ==
- (Brazil) Togo "Kanela" Renan Soares
- (Brazil) Wlamir Marques
- (Brazil) Cláudio Mortari

== See also ==
- SE Palmeiras
- Sociedade Esportiva Palmeiras (women)
