= 1954 FIBA World Championship squads =

The 1954 FIBA World Championship squads were the squads of the 1954 FIBA World Championship. Each of the 12 teams at the tournament selected a squad of 12 players.

== Group A ==
=== Brazil ===
- 4 Wilson Bombarda
- 5 Ângelo Bonfietti
- 6 José Henrique Carli
- 7 Almir Nelson de Almeida
- 8 Algodão
- 9 Mayr Facci
- 10 Fausto Sucena Rasga Filho
- 11 Jamil Gedeão
- 12 Amaury Pasos
- 13 Alfredo da Motta
- 14 Wlamir Marques
- coach Togo Renan Soares

=== Paraguay ===
- 3 Antonio Zapattini Ortiz
- 4 Reinaldo Cálcena
- 5 Antonio F. Coscia
- 6 Gustavo Bendlin Souza Lobos
- 7 Oswaldo Mongelós
- 8 Francisco S. Yegros
- 9 Rubén Darío Olavarrieta Onieva
- 10 Federico Abente
- 11 José Emilio Gorostiaga
- 12 Jorge Bogado
- 13 Arístides Isusi
- 14 Óscar Amarilla
- coach Carlos Rojas y Rojas

=== Philippines ===
Head coach: Herminio Silva

#	Pos	Name	Year born	Team
3		Lauro Mumar	1924	
4		Francisco Rabat		(Philippines) Ateneo Blue Eagles
5		Napoleon Flores		(Philippines) UST Glowing Goldies
6		Mariano Tolentino	1928	
7		Benjamin Francisco		(Philippines) PAL Skymasters
8		Rafael Barretto	1931	(Philippines) San Miguel–San Beda
9		Ponciano Saldaña	1928	
10		Florentino Batista		
11		Ramon Manulat	1930	(Philippines) UST Glowing Goldies
12		Bayani Amador		(Philippines) FEU Tamaraws
13		Antonio Genato	1929	
14		Carlos Loyzaga	1930	

== Group B ==
=== Canada ===
Head coach: Jim Bulloch

#	Pos	Name	Year born	Team
9		Carl Ridd	1929	(Canada) Winnipeg Paulins
10		Mike Spack		(Canada) Winnipeg Paulins
22		Roy Burkett		(Canada) Winnipeg Paulins
23		George Oelkers		(Canada) Winnipeg Paulins
33		Ralph Watts		(Canada) Winnipeg Paulins
43		Andy Spack		(Canada) Winnipeg Paulins
44		Doug Gresham		(Canada) Winnipeg Paulins
45		Ken Callis		(Canada) Winnipeg Paulins
55		Herb Olafson		(Canada) Winnipeg Paulins
88		Wally Parobec		(Canada) Winnipeg Paulins

=== United States ===
Head coach: Warren Womble

#	Pos	Name	Year born	Team
11	Center	Don Penwell		(United States) Peoria Caterpillars
12	Forward	Kirby Minter	1929	(United States) Peoria Caterpillars
14	Forward	Dick Retherford		(United States) Peoria Caterpillars
21	Forward	Richard Gott		(United States) Peoria Caterpillars
22	Forward	Bill Johnson		(United States) Peoria Caterpillars
24	Guard	Joe Stratton		(United States) Peoria Caterpillars
34	Guard	Allen Kelley	1932	(United States) Peoria Caterpillars
34	Forward	Forrest Hamilton	1930	(United States) Peoria Caterpillars
44	Guard	Kendall Sheets	1931	(United States) Peoria Caterpillars
45	Center	B. H. Born	1932	(United States) Peoria Caterpillars
55	Forward	Ed Solomon		(United States) Peoria Caterpillars

== Group C ==
=== Uruguay ===
- 4 Oscar Moglia
- 5 Martín Acosta y Lara
- 6 Héctor García Otero
- 7 Roberto Lovera
- 8 Nelson Demarco
- 9 Adesio Lombardo
- 10 Carlos Roselló
- 11 Omar Zubillaga
- 12 Hector Costa
- 13 Raul Mera
- 14 Manuel Usher Ferrer
- 15 Julio Cesar Gully
- coach Prudencio de Pena

=== Yugoslavia ===
- 3 Bogdan Müller
- 4 Mirko Marjanović
- 5 Milan Bjegojević
- 6 Đorđe Andrijašević
- 7 Lajos Engler
- 8 Đorđe Konjović
- 9 Dragan Godžić
- 10 Milan Blagojević
- 11 Aleksandar Blašković
- 12 Boris Kristančič
- 13 Vilmos Lóczi
- 14 Borislav Ćurčić
- coach Aleksandar Nikolić
