= Basketball at the 1987 Pan American Games – Men's team rosters =

Basketball squads

The following is a list of rosters for each nation that competed in the men's basketball tournament at the 1987 Pan American Games in Indianapolis.

== Key ==
Pos.	Position
C	Center
PF	Power Forward
SF	Small Forward
SG	Shooting Guard
PG	Point Guard

== Teams ==
=== Argentina ===
Argentina men's basketball team roster
Players
Coaches

Pos.	No.	Name	Age – Date of birth	Height	Club	Ctr.
PF		Sergio Aispurúa	22 – 10 October 1964	2.00 m (6 ft 7 in)	Club Atlético Argentino	(Argentina)
SF		Esteban Camisassa	27 – 3 August 1960	1.97 m (6 ft 6 in)
PG		Miguel Cortijo	28 – 22 August 1958	1.87 m (6 ft 2 in)	Ferro Carril Oeste	(Argentina)
G/F		Jorge Faggiano	26 – 24 March 1961		Estudiantes de Bahía Blanca	(Argentina)
		Luis González	–
C		Diego Maggi	23 – 22 November 1963	2.06 m (6 ft 9 in)	Ferro Carril Oeste	(Argentina)
SG		Raúl Merlo	20 – 10 February 1967	1.94 m (6 ft 4 in)	Sport Club Cañadense	(Argentina)
PG		Marcelo Milanesio	22 – 11 February 1965	1.88 m (6 ft 2 in)	Asociación Deportiva Atenas	(Argentina)
C		Hernán Montenegro	20 – 10 August 1966	2.06 m (6 ft 9 in)	Unión de Santa Fe	(Argentina)
SF		Esteban Pérez	21 – 26 March 1966	2.00 m (6 ft 7 in)	Club Olimpo	(Argentina)
PG		Carlos Romano	30 – 30 March 1957	1.88 m (6 ft 2 in)
C		Rubén Scolari	20 – 25 September 1966	2.06 m (6 ft 9 in)	Club Olimpo	(Argentina)

Head coach

- (Puerto Rico) Flor Meléndez

Legend

- (C) Team captain
- Club – describes current club
- Age – describes age
  on 9 August 1987

=== Brazil ===
Brazil men's basketball team roster
Players
Coaches

Pos.	No.	Name	Age – Date of birth	Height	Club	Ctr.
C		Paulo Almeida	24 – 26 January 1963	2.16 m (7 ft 1 in)	Clube Atlético Monte Líbano	(Brazil)
C		Israel Andrade	27 – 17 January 1960	2.06 m (6 ft 9 in)	Fabriano Basket	(Italy)
C		Rolando Ferreira	23 – 24 May 1964	2.16 m (7 ft 1 in)	Houston Cougars	(United States)
PG		Jorge Guerra	28 – 21 June 1959	1.86 m (6 ft 1 in)
G		Ricardo Guimarães	28 – 4 February 1959	2.00 m (6 ft 7 in)	Clube Atlético Monte Líbano	(Brazil)
C		Sílvio Malvezi	27 – 17 March 1960	2.07 m (6 ft 9 in)
F		Oscar Schmidt	29 – 16 February 1958	2.06 m (6 ft 9 in)	JuveCaserta Basket	(Italy)
G/F		Marcel de Souza	30 – 4 December 1956	1.99 m (6 ft 6 in)	Fabriano Basket	(Italy)
PG		Maury de Souza	24 – 2 September 1962	1.90 m (6 ft 3 in)	Flamengo Basketball	(Brazil)
C		André Stoffel	27 – 9 April 1960	2.02 m (6 ft 8 in)	Clube Atlético Monte Líbano	(Brazil)
PF		João Vianna	20 – 15 November 1966	2.06 m (6 ft 9 in)	Clube Atlético Monte Líbano	(Brazil)
PF		Gerson Victalino	27 – 19 September 1959	2.05 m (6 ft 9 in)

Head coach

- (Brazil) Ary Vidal

Legend

- (C) Team captain
- Club – describes current club
- Age – describes age
  on 9 August 1987

=== Canada ===
Canada men's basketball team roster
Players
Coaches

Pos.	No.	Name	Age – Date of birth	Height	Club	Ctr.
		Norman Clarke	27 – 27 June 1960
C		Cord Clemens	23 – 28 September 1963	2.13 m (7 ft 0 in)	Victoria Vikes	(Canada)
SF		John Hatch	25 – 23 February 1962	1.98 m (6 ft 6 in)
		Alan Kristmanson	25 – 5 November 1961	2.01 m (6 ft 7 in)
PF		Barry Mungar	25 – 4 November 1961	2.03 m (6 ft 8 in)	Libertas Livorno	(Italy)
PG		Eli Pasquale	26 – 24 August 1960	1.85 m (6 ft 1 in)
C		Romel Raffin	33 – 23 April 1954	2.06 m (6 ft 9 in)
SG		Tony Simms	28 – 16 February 1959	1.96 m (6 ft 5 in)
SG		Karl Tilleman	26 – 1 November 1960	1.88 m (6 ft 2 in)
G		Jay Triano	28 – 21 September 1958	1.93 m (6 ft 4 in)
SF		Dwight Walton	22 – 25 March 1965	1.93 m (6 ft 4 in)	Siena Saints	(United States)
SF		Wayne Yearwood	22 – 22 September 1964	2.01 m (6 ft 7 in)	West Virginia Mountaineers	(United States)

Head coach

- (United States) Jack Donohue

Legend

- (C) Team captain
- Club – describes current club
- Age – describes age
  on 9 August 1987

=== Mexico ===
Mexico men's basketball team roster
Players
Coaches

Pos.	No.	Name	Age – Date of birth	Height	Club	Ctr.
		Calixto Arroyo	–
F		José Arroyos	25 – 20 January 1962	1.99 m (6 ft 6 in)
C		Julio Gallardo	29 – 26 June 1958	2.08 m (6 ft 10 in)	Indios de Mayagüez	(Puerto Rico)
		Roberto González	–
		Armando Lazzeri	–
		Esteban Ledezma	–
		Luis López	–
		Mario López	–
		Norberto Mena	27 – 23 August 1959
C		Antonio Reyes	24 – 22 August 1962	2.18 m (7 ft 2 in)
		Arturo Sánchez	–
G		Francisco Siller	–

Legend

- (C) Team captain
- Club – describes current club
- Age – describes age
  on 9 August 1987

=== Panama ===
Panama men's basketball team roster
Players
Coaches

Pos.	No.	Name	Age – Date of birth	Height	Club	Ctr.
C		Mario Butler	30 – 15 January 1957	2.03 m (6 ft 8 in)	RCD Espanyol Bàsquet	(Spain)
		Cirilo Escalona	23 – 19 November 1963
PF		Rolando Frazer	29 – 3 July 1958	2.01 m (6 ft 7 in)	Polluelos de Aibonito	(Puerto Rico)
F		Mario Gálvez	27 – 7 August 1960	1.90 m (6 ft 3 in)
PG		Enrique Grenald	25 – 22 March 1962	1.84 m (6 ft 0 in)
G		Reginaldo Grenald	–	1.85 m (6 ft 1 in)
SF		Ernesto Malcolm	31 – 15 July 1956	1.93 m (6 ft 4 in)
		Amado Martínez	–		Briar Cliff Chargers	(United States)
C		Guillermo Myers	19 – 17 March 1968	2.03 m (6 ft 8 in)	Briar Cliff Chargers	(United States)
		Fernando Pinillo	27 – 24 October 1959		Briar Cliff Chargers	(United States)
		Braulio Rivas	–	1.98 m (6 ft 6 in)
F		Carlos Rockshead	–	1.96 m (6 ft 5 in)
SF		Alfonso Smith	–	1.96 m (6 ft 5 in)

Legend

- (C) Team captain
- Club – describes current club
- Age – describes age
  on 9 August 1987

=== Puerto Rico ===
Puerto Rico men's basketball team roster
Players
Coaches

Pos.	No.	Name	Age – Date of birth	Height	Club	Ctr.
PG		Ángel Cruz	28 – 20 September 1958	1.78 m (5 ft 10 in)	Indios de Canóvanas	(Puerto Rico)
		Edgar de León	22 – 22 November 1964	2.03 m (6 ft 8 in)	Cariduros de Fajardo	(Puerto Rico)
PG		Federico López	25 – 26 March 1962	1.96 m (6 ft 5 in)	Mets de Guaynabo	(Puerto Rico)
		Orlando Marrero	–		Vaqueros de Bayamón	(Puerto Rico)
		Willie Meléndez	–		Polluelos de Aibonito	(Puerto Rico)
PF		Jerome Mincy	22 – 10 October 1964	2.03 m (6 ft 8 in)	Vaqueros de Bayamón	(Puerto Rico)
SF		Mario Morales	29 – 13 November 1957	1.95 m (6 ft 5 in)	Mets de Guaynabo	(Puerto Rico)
		Jerry Ocasio	29 – 19 February 1958		Indios de Mayagüez	(Puerto Rico)
C		José Ortiz	23 – 25 October 1963	2.08 m (6 ft 10 in)	CB Zaragoza	(Spain)
C		Ramon Ramos	19 – 20 November 1967	2.03 m (6 ft 8 in)	Seton Hall Pirates	(United States)
SF		Ángel Santiago	31 – 3 July 1956	1.96 m (6 ft 5 in)	Polluelos de Aibonito	(Puerto Rico)
SF		Deán Borges	20 – 14 July 1967	1.96 m (6 ft 5 in)	Wagner Seahawks	(United States)

Head coach

- (United States) Gene Bartow

Assistant coach(es)

- (Puerto Rico) Armando Torres

Legend

- (C) Team captain
- Club – describes current club
- Age – describes age
  on 9 August 1987

=== United States ===
United States men's basketball team roster
Players
Coaches

Pos.	No.	Name	Age – Date of birth	Height	Club	Ctr.
SF		Willie Anderson	20 – 8 January 1967	2.01 m (6 ft 7 in)	Georgia Bulldogs	(United States)
SF		Ricky Berry	22 – 6 October 1964	2.03 m (6 ft 8 in)	San Jose State Spartans	(United States)
SG		Rex Chapman	19 – 5 October 1967	1.93 m (6 ft 4 in)	Kentucky Wildcats	(United States)
SF		Fennis Dembo	21 – 24 January 1966	1.96 m (6 ft 5 in)	Wyoming Cowboys	(United States)
C		Pervis Ellison	20 – 3 April 1967	2.06 m (6 ft 9 in)	Louisville Cardinals	(United States)
C		Dean Garrett	20 – 27 November 1966	2.11 m (6 ft 11 in)	Indiana Hoosiers	(United States)
PF		Jerome Lane	20 – 4 December 1966	1.98 m (6 ft 6 in)	Pittsburgh Panthers	(United States)
SG		Jeff Lebo	20 – 5 October 1966	1.88 m (6 ft 2 in)	North Carolina Tar Heels	(United States)
C		Danny Manning	21 – 17 May 1966	2.08 m (6 ft 10 in)	Kansas Jayhawks	(United States)
PG		Pooh Richardson	21 – 14 May 1966	1.85 m (6 ft 1 in)	UCLA Bruins	(United States)
C		David Robinson	22 – 6 August 1965	2.16 m (7 ft 1 in)	Navy Midshipmen	(United States)
PG		Keith Smart	22 – 21 September 1964	1.85 m (6 ft 1 in)	Indiana Hoosiers	(United States)

Head coach

- (United States) Denny Crum

Legend

- (C) Team captain
- Club – describes current club
- Age – describes age
  on 9 August 1987

=== Uruguay ===
Uruguay men's basketball team roster
Players
Coaches

Pos.	No.	Name	Age – Date of birth	Height	Club	Ctr.
C		Luis Larrosa	29 – 31 March 1958	2.03 m (6 ft 8 in)
SF		Adolfo Medrick	31 – 2 January 1956	1.98 m (6 ft 6 in)
C		Juan Mignone	25 – 14 November 1961	2.08 m (6 ft 10 in)
PF		Óscar Moglia	22 – 3 January 1965	2.05 m (6 ft 9 in)
PF		Hebert Núñez	31 – 7 June 1956	2.02 m (6 ft 8 in)
PG		Carlos Peinado	32 – 23 December 1954	1.85 m (6 ft 1 in)	Hebraica Macabi	(Uruguay)
PG		Horacio Perdomo	26 – 14 November 1960	1.85 m (6 ft 1 in)
PF		Luis Pierri	24 – 10 March 1963	2.02 m (6 ft 8 in)	Club Atlético Bohemios	(Uruguay)
		Nazar Rodríguez	–
C		Gustavo Szczygielski	19 – 28 September 1967	2.04 m (6 ft 8 in)	Club Biguá de Villa Biarritz	(Uruguay)
G		Álvaro Tito	25 – 17 January 1962	1.90 m (6 ft 3 in)
		Hugo Vázquez	19 – 2 March 1968

Head coach

- (Uruguay) Javier Espíndola

Legend

- (C) Team captain
- Club – describes current club
- Age – describes age
  on 9 August 1987

=== Venezuela ===
Venezuela men's basketball team roster
Players
Coaches

Pos.	No.	Name	Age – Date of birth	Height	Club	Ctr.
		José Acosta	–
F		Armando Becker	21 – 9 June 1966	1.96 m (6 ft 5 in)	Panteras de Miranda	(Venezuela)
		Nelson Bompart	–
PG		David Díaz	23 – 31 January 1964	1.83 m (6 ft 0 in)	Bravos de Portuguesa	(Venezuela)
		Yamal El-Hawi	–
PF		Gabriel Estaba	22 – 24 March 1965	1.98 m (6 ft 6 in)	Jacksonville College	(United States)
F		Rostyn González	23 – 14 February 1964	1.98 m (6 ft 6 in)
PF		Carl Herrera	20 – 14 December 1966	2.06 m (6 ft 9 in)	Jacksonville College	(United States)
SF		Iván Olivares	25 – 10 December 1961	1.95 m (6 ft 5 in)	Trotamundos de Carabobo	(Venezuela)
		Felice Parisi	29 – 31 August 1957		Gaiteros del Zulia	(Venezuela)
PG		Sam Shepherd	34 – 21 April 1953	1.80 m (5 ft 11 in)
PG		Nelson Solórzano	28 – 30 March 1959	1.80 m (5 ft 11 in)
		Luis Sosa	–

Head coach

- (Venezuela) Pedro Espinoza

Legend

- (C) Team captain
- Club – describes current club
- Age – describes age
  on 9 August 1987

=== Virgin Islands ===
Virgin Islands men's basketball team roster
Players
Coaches

Pos.	No.	Name	Age – Date of birth	Height	Club	Ctr.
		Earl Andrews	–
		Elnes Bolling	–
		Donald Bough	26 – 20 June 1961
C		Fitzroy Brow	–	2.11 m (6 ft 11 in)	Virginia Tech Hokies	(United States)
F		Elvin Brown	–	1.96 m (6 ft 5 in)	Tennessee Volunteers	(United States)
PF		Sylvester Charles	25 – 11 February 1962	2.03 m (6 ft 8 in)
		Joseph Faulkner	–
		Raymond Lettsome	24 – 15 January 1963
SF		Milt Newton	21 – 25 August 1965	1.96 m (6 ft 5 in)	Kansas Jayhawks	(United States)
		Darwin Ronan	–
		Neil Smith	–	1.93 m (6 ft 4 in)	LIU Sharks	(United States)
		Keith Swanston	–
G		Richie Welch	–	1.85 m (6 ft 1 in)

Head coach

- (United States) Tevester Anderson

Legend

- (C) Team captain
- Club – describes current club
- Age – describes age
  on 9 August 1987
