= Brazil at the 1955 Pan American Games =

- IOC code: BRA
- NOC: Brazilian Olympic Committee
- Website: www.cob.org.br

in Mexico City March 12 - March 26, 1955
- Competitors: 135 in 17 sports
- Medals Ranked 7th: Gold 2 Silver 3 Bronze 13 Total 18

Pan American Games appearances (overview)
- 1951; 1955; 1959; 1963; 1967; 1971; 1975; 1979; 1983; 1987; 1991; 1995; 1999; 2003; 2007; 2011; 2015; 2019; 2023; 2027

Brazil competed at the 2nd Pan American Games held in Mexico City, Mexico from March 12 to March 26, 1955.

== Medals ==
Medal	Name(s)	Sport	Event	Date	Ref
Bronze	José Telles da Conceição	Athletics	Men's high jump	13 March 1955	
Bronze	Ary de Sá	Athletics	Men's long jump	14 March 1955	
Bronze	Wilson Carneiro	Athletics	Men's 400m hurdles	14 March 1955	
Gold	Adhemar Ferreira da Silva	Athletics	Men's triple jump	16 March 1955	
Bronze	José Telles da Conceição	Athletics	Men's 200m	16 March 1955	
Bronze	Wanda dos Santos	Athletics	Women's 80m hurdles	17 March 1955	
Silver	Deyse de Castro	Athletics	Women's high jump	17 March 1955	
Bronze	Men's basketball team: Wlamir Marques Amaury Pasos Almir Nelson de Almeida Mayr Facci Wilson Bombarda Edson Bispo Pedro Vicente Fonseca Leonardo Ribeiro Paraíso Moacyr Penha Ribeiro Carlos Marino Willi Pecher Zenny de Azevedo	Basketball	Men's tournament	24 March 1955	
Bronze	Women's basketball team: Neuci Ramos da Silva Agláe Giorgio Nair Kanawatti Wanda Lima Bezerra Eugenia Rindeika Isaura Marli Alvares Marlene José Bento Zilah Helen Santos Maria Helena Cardoso Zilda Ulbrich Laura Rodrigues Nivea Figueiredo Silva	Basketball	Women's tournament		
Bronze	Celestino Pinto	Boxing	Men's light welterweight (-63,5 kg)		
Gold	Luiz Ignácio	Boxing	Men's light heavyweight (-81 kg)		
Silver	Adão Waldemar	Boxing	Men's heavyweight (+81 kg)		
Bronze	Ingrid Metzner	Tennis	Women's singles		
Bronze	Ingrid Metzner; Maria Esther Bueno	Tennis	Women's doubles		
Bronze	Men's volleyball team: Atila Gonçalves Martins Fernando Pavan Gilberto Geraldo Barcelos Jorge Almeida Belo Jorge Bittencourt José Gil Mendonça Lucio Cunha Figueiredo Mário Figueira Sobrinho Oscar Cunha Pinheiro Parker Gilbert Carvalho Reginaldo Lyra Silva Urbano Santiago	Volleyball	Men's tournament		
Bronze	Women's volleyball team: Celma de Araújo Helena Valente Duarte Hildergarde Lassen Isaura Marli Alvares Lillian Collier Maria Imaculada Machado Maria José Barros Marlene Schenkel Norma Rosa Vaz Sônia Freire Araújo Vera Trezoitko Zilda Ulbrich	Volleyball	Women's tournament		
Bronze	Men's water polo team: Adhemar Grijó Filho Amaury Fonseca Denir Ribeiro Edson Peri Eduardo Alijó Everaldo Cruz Hilton de Almeida Márvio dos Santos Roberto de Araújo Rodney Bell Rolf Kestener	Water polo	Men's tournament		
Silver	Bruno Barabani	Weightlifting	Men's middle heavyweight (-90 kg)		

Medals by sport
Sport	1st place, gold medalist(s)	2nd place, silver medalist(s)	3rd place, bronze medalist(s)	Total
Athletics	1	1	5	7
Boxing	1	1	1	3
Weightlifting	0	1	0	1
Basketball	0	0	2	2
Tennis	0	0	2	2
Volleyball	0	0	2	2
Waterpolo	0	0	1	1
Total	2	3	13	18

== See also ==
- Brazil at the 1956 Summer Olympics
- List of Pan American medalists for Brazil
