= Gerson Victalino =

Brazilian basketball player (1959–2020)

Personal information
- Born: 19 September 1959 Belo Horizonte, Brazil
- Died: 29 April 2020 (aged 60) Belo Horizonte, Brazil
- Listed height: 6 ft 8.75 in (2.05 m)
- Listed weight: 210 lb (95 kg)
- Position: Power forward / center
Medals
Men's basketball
Representing Brazil
Pan American Games
| Gold medal – first place | 1987 Indianapolis | Team competition |
| Silver medal – second place | 1983 Caracas | Team competition |

Gerson Victalino (19 September 1959 – 29 April 2020), also commonly known simply as Gerson, was a Brazilian professional basketball player.

== National team career ==
With the senior Brazilian national basketball team, Victalino won a silver medal at the 1983 Pan American Games and a gold medal at the 1987 Pan American Games. He competed at the Summer Olympics in 1984, 1988, and 1992.

Victalino was also a member of the Brazilian teams which respectively finished in fourth place at the 1986 FIBA World Championship and fifth place at the 1990 FIBA World Championship.
