= Israel Andrade =

Brazilian basketball player (born 1960)

Personal information
- Born: 17 January 1960 (age 66) Salvador, Brazil
- Listed height: 6 ft 9 in (2.06 m)
- Listed weight: 245 lb (111 kg)
- Position: Center

Career highlights
- 4× Brazilian champion (1982, 1985, 1986 (I), 1986 (II))

Israel Machado Campelo Andrade (born January 17, 1960, in Salvador), commonly known as Israel Andrade or simply Israel, is a former professional basketball player from Brazil.

== Professional career ==
During his pro club career, Andrade won 4 Brazilian Championships, in the seasons 1982, 1985, 1986 (I), and 1986 (II), while a member of C.A. Monte Líbano.

== National team career ==
Andrade played with the senior Brazilian national basketball team at three consecutive Summer Olympic Games, at the 1984 Summer Olympic Games, the 1988 Summer Olympic games, and the 1992 Summer Olympic Games. Andrade was also a member of the Brazilian national team that won the gold medal at the 1987 Pan American Games, where he scored 78 points in seven games during the tournament. He also played at the 1982 FIBA World Cup, the 1986 FIBA World Cup, and the 1990 FIBA World Cup.
