= José Luiz Olaio Neto =

Brazilian basketball player

Medal record

Men's basketball

Representing Brazil

World Championship
| Bronze medal – third place | 1967 Montevideo | Team |
| Silver medal – second place | 1970 Ljubljana | Team |

José Luiz Olaio Neto, commonly known as Zé Olaio, is a former Brazilian basketball player. Netto participated at the 1967 and 1970 FIBA World Championships with the Brazil national basketball team.
