= Ruy de Freitas =

Brazilian basketball player

Personal information
- Born: 24 August 1916 Macaé, Rio de Janeiro, Brazil
- Died: 2 August 2012 (aged 95) Rio de Janeiro, Rio de Janeiro, Brazil
Medals
Men's basketball
Representing Brazil
Olympic Games
Bronze medal – third place	1948 London	Team

Ruy de Freitas (24 August 1916 – 2 August 2012), also commonly known as Tio Ruy, was a Brazilian professional basketball player and coach, who competed in two consecutive Summer Olympics, starting in 1948. He was born in Macaé. At his first appearance in London he won the bronze medal with the Brazilian basketball team under the guidance of head coach Moacyr Daiuto.
