= César Augusto Sebba =

Brazilian basketball player

Medal record

Men's basketball

Representing Brazil

World Championship
Bronze medal – third place	1967 Montevideo	Team

César Augusto Sebba, also commonly known as César Sebba, is a former Brazilian basketball player. Seba participated at the 1967 FIBA World Championship with the Brazil national basketball team.
