= Olívia (basketball) =

Brazilian basketball player (born 1974)

Personal information
- Born: 3 February 1974 (age 51); Rio de Janeiro, Brazil

Carlos Henrique Rodrigues do Nascimento (born 3 February 1974), also commonly known as Olívia, is a Brazilian former professional basketball player. With the senior Brazilian national basketball team, do Nascimento competed at the 1994 FIBA World Cup, and the 1996 Summer Olympics.
