= João Vianna =

Brazilian basketball player

Personal information
- Born: 15 November 1966 (age 59) Brasília, Brazil
- Listed height: 6 ft 9 in (2.06 m)
- Listed weight: 215 lb (98 kg)

Career information
- NBA draft: 1988: undrafted
- Position: Power forward
- Number: 31

Career history
- 1989–1991: Maratonistas de Coamo
- 1991: Dallas Mavericks
- 1993: Maratonistas de Coamo

Career highlights
- 2× South American Club champion (1985, 1986); 5× Brazilian champion (1985, 1986 (I), 1986 (II), 1987, 2007)
- Stats at NBA.com
- Stats at Basketball Reference

João José "Pipoka" Vianna (born 15 November 1966), is a Brazilian former professional basketball player. At a height of 2.06 m (6 ft 9 in) tall, he played at the power forward position.

== Professional career ==
During his pro club career, Vianna won 5 Brazilian Championships, in the seasons 1985, 1986 (I), 1986 (II), 1987, and 2007. Vianna also played briefly with the Dallas Mavericks of the National Basketball Association (NBA), during the 1991–92 season, becoming just the second Brazilian player to play in the NBA, after Rolando Ferreira.

Vianna played for Maratonistas de Coamo at the BSN in Puerto Rico from 1989 to 1991, and in 1993.

== National team career ==
Vianna represented the senior Brazil national basketball team at the 1988 Summer Olympics, the 1992 Summer Olympics, and the 1996 Summer Olympics, as well as several other international competitions. He was also a part of the Brazil national team that won the 1987 Pan American Games, in Indianapolis, over Team USA.

He also played at the 1986 FIBA World Cup, the 1990 FIBA World Cup, the 1994 FIBA World Cup, and the 1998 FIBA World Cup.
