= Nilo Guimarães (basketball) =

Brazilian basketball player (born 1957)

Personal information
- Born: 4 April 1957 (age 69) Mogi das Cruzes, Brazil
- Listed height: 5 ft 11 in (1.80 m)
- Listed weight: 160 lb (73 kg)
- Position: Point guard

Nilo Martins Guimarães (born 4 April 1957) is a Brazilian former professional basketball player and coach.

== National team career ==
With the senior Brazilian national basketball team, Guimarães competed at the 1982 FIBA World Cup, the 1984 Summer Olympics, and the 1986 FIBA World Cup.
