= Antônio José Nogueira Santana =

Brazilian basketball player

Personal information
- Born: 26 July 1972 (age 52); Brasília, Brazil

Antônio José Nogueira Santana, also commonly known as "Tonico" (born 26 July 1972), is a Brazilian former professional basketball player. With the senior Brazilian national basketball team, Santana competed at the 1994 FIBA World Cup, and the 1996 Summer Olympics.
