= João Francisco Bráz =

Brazilian basketball player (1920–1996)

Personal information
- Born: 25 November 1920 São Paulo, Brazil
- Died: 11 September 1996 (aged 75)
Medals
Men's basketball
Representing Brazil
Olympic Games
Bronze medal – third place	1948 London	Team

João Francisco Bráz (25 November 1920 – 11 September 1996), commonly known simply as Bráz, was a Brazilian basketball player. Born in São Paulo, at his Olympic debut he won the bronze medal with Brazilian basketball team under the guidance of head coach Moacyr Daiuto.
