= Adilson Nascimento =

Brazilian basketball player

Personal information
- Born: 3 December 1951 São Paulo, Brazil
- Died: 3 February 2009 (aged 57) Campinas, Brazil
- Listed height: 6 ft 4.75 in (1.95 m)
- Listed weight: 220 lb (100 kg)
- Position: Power forward / center

Career highlights
- Brazilian champion (1973)

Adilson de Freitas Nascimento, also commonly known as Adilson Nascimento, or simply Adilson (3 December 1951 – 3 February 2009), was a Brazilian professional basketball player. He died in 2009 due to cancer.

== Professional career ==
During his pro club career, Nascimento won the Brazilian Championship, in the year 1973, with Vila Nova.

== National team career ==
With the senior Brazilian national basketball team, Nascimento competed at the following major world tournaments: the 1972 Summer Olympics, the 1974 FIBA World Cup, the 1978 FIBA World Cup, the 1980 Summer Olympics, the 1982 FIBA World Cup, and the 1984 Summer Olympics.
