= Rafael Barretto =

Filipino basketball player (1931–1999)

Personal information
- Born: September 30, 1931
- Died: December 25, 1999 (aged 68) Melbourne, Australia
- Listed height: 6 ft 2 in (188 cm)
- Listed weight: 196 lb (89 kg)
Medals
Men's basketball
Representing Philippines
FIBA World Championship
Bronze medal – third place	1954 Rio de Janeiro	Team

Rafael Geronimo Barretto y Soler (September 30, 1931 – December 25, 1999) was a Filipino basketball player who competed in the 1956 Summer Olympics.
