= Massinet Sorcinelli =

Brazilian basketball player

Personal information
- Born: 27 February 1922 São Paulo, Brazil
- Died: 12 August 1971 (aged 49)
Medals
Men's basketball
Representing Brazil
Olympic Games
Bronze medal – third place	1948 London	Team
Pan American Games
Bronze medal – third place	1951 Buenos Aires	Team

Massinet Sorcinelli (27 February 1922 in São Paulo – 12 August 1971) was a Brazilian basketball player who competed in the 1948 Summer Olympics in London, United Kingdom. There he won the bronze medal with the men's national basketball team under the guidance of head coach Moacyr Daiuto.
