= André Ernesto Stoffel =

Brazilian basketball player (born 1960)

Personal information
- Born: 9 April 1960 (age 66) São Paulo, Brazil
- Listed height: 6 ft 7.5 in (2.02 m)
- Listed weight: 200 lb (91 kg)
- Position: Center

Career highlights
- 4× Brazilian champion (1982, 1985, 1986 (I), 1986 (II))

André Ernesto Stoffel, also commonly known simply as André (born 9 April 1960) is a Brazilian former professional basketball player.

== Career ==
During his pro club career, Stoffel won 4 Brazilian Championships, in the seasons 1982, 1985, 1986 (I), and 1986 (II), while a member of C.A. Monte Líbano.

With the senior men's Brazilian national basketball team, Stoffel played at the 1980 Summer Olympic Games, and the 1982 FIBA World Cup.
