= Pedro Vicente Fonseca =

Brazilian basketball player (born 1935)

Personal information
- Born: 21 January 1935 (age 91) São Paulo, Brazil
- Listed height: 5 ft 11 in (1.80 m)
- Position: Point guard
Medals
Men's basketball
Representing Brazil
FIBA World Cup
| Gold medal – first place | 1959 Santiago de Chile |
Pan American Games
| Bronze medal – third place | 1955 Mexico City |
| Bronze medal – third place | 1959 Chicago |
FIBA South American Championship
| Bronze medal – third place | 1955 Colombia |

Pedro "Pecente" Vicente da Fonseca (born 21 January 1935 in São Vicente), commonly known as Picente Fonseca, or simply as Picente, is a retired Brazilian professional basketball player. At a height of 1.80 m (5 ft 11 in) tall, he played at the point guard position.

== Professional career ==
As a professional player, he played for several clubs, including: São Vicente, Santos, and XV de Piracicaba.

== National team career ==
With the senior Brazilian national basketball team, Picente won the gold medal at the 1959 FIBA World Championship, in Chile. He also won bronze medals at the 1955 Pan American Games, and the 1959. He also won a bronze medal at the 1955 FIBA South American Championship. In total, he played in 26 official games with the senior Brazilian national team, scoring a total of 151 points.

== Post-playing career ==
After he ended his basketball playing career, Picente became the technical coordinator of the Clube de Campo de Piracicaba youth basketball teams, as well as the director of AVEBESP, which is the veteran basketball players association of São Paulo state.
