= Zé Geraldo =

Brazilian basketball player (born 1950)

Personal information
- Born: 18 September 1950 (age 76) São Paulo, Brazil
- Listed height: 6 ft 6.75 in (2.00 m)
- Listed weight: 175 lb (79 kg)
- Position: Small forward

José Geraldo de Castro, commonly known as Zé Geraldo (born 18 September 1950) is a Brazilian former professional basketball player. With the senior Brazilian national basketball team, Geraldo competed at the 1968 Summer Olympics, the 1972 Summer Olympics, and the 1974 FIBA World Cup.
