= Antônio Salvador Sucar =

Brazilian basketball player

Personal information
- Born: 14 June 1939 San Isidro de Lules, Argentina
- Died: 31 December 2018 (aged 79) São Paulo, Brazil
- Listed height: 200 cm (6 ft 7 in)
- Listed weight: 100 kg (220 lb)
Medals
Men's basketball
Representing Brazil
Olympic Games
Bronze medal – third place	1960 Rome	Team
Bronze medal – third place	1964 Tokyo	Team
World Championship
Gold medal – first place	1963 Brazil	Team
Bronze medal – third place	1967 Uruguay	Team

Antônio Salvador Sucar (14 June 1939 – 31 December 2018) was a Brazilian basketball player. He was a member of the team that won the title at the 1963 World Championship, in Rio de Janeiro, and the bronze medal at the 1967 FIBA World Championship with the Brazil national basketball team. Sucar participated in three Summer Olympic Games and won two bronze medals in 1960 and 1964.
