= Jorge Guerra =

Jorge Guerra may refer to:

- Jorge Guerra (basketball) ("Jorge Guerrinha", born 1959), Brazilian basketball player and coach
- Jorge Guerra (cyclist) (Jorge Guerra Cepeda, 1913–2003), Chilean sports cyclist
- Jorge Guerra Toledo (fl. 1920s), Chilean politician, minister of war
- Jorge Guerra Vergara (1861–1908), Chilean politician, member of the Chamber of Deputies
