= Zé Luiz (basketball) =

Brazilian basketball player

José Luiz Santos de Azevedo, commonly known as Zé Luiz (22 November 1929 – 18 May 1986), was a Brazilian basketball player who competed in the 1952 Summer Olympics and in the 1956 Summer Olympics.
