= Hélio Marques Pereira =

Brazilian basketball player

Hélio "Godinho" Marques Pereira, also commonly known simply as Godinho (27 August 1925 – 10 September 1971), was a Brazilian basketball player who competed in the 1952 Summer Olympics. He was a notable figure in Brazilian basketball, having played for the Brazilian national team and was associated with the Clube de Regatas do Flamengo basketball team. His achievements include being a finalist at the 1954 FIBA World Championship and earning a bronze medal at the 1951 Pan American Games.
