= Rolando Ferreira =

Brazilian basketball player and coach

Personal information
- Born: 24 May 1964 (age 62) Curitiba, Paraná, Brazil
- Listed height: 7 ft 1 in (2.16 m)
- Listed weight: 240 lb (109 kg)

Career information
- High school: Colegro Objectivo (São Paulo, Brazil)
- College: Houston (1986–1988)
- NBA draft: 1988: 2nd round, 26th overall pick
- Drafted by: Portland Trail Blazers
- Playing career: 1983–2001
- Position: Center
- Number: 32

Career history
- 1988–1989: Portland Trail Blazers

Career highlights
- South American Club champion (1984); Brazilian champion (1983)
- Stats at NBA.com
- Stats at Basketball Reference
Medals
Men's basketball
Representing Brazil
Pan American Games
Gold medal – first place	1987 Indianapolis

Rolando Ferreira Júnior (born May 24, 1964) is a Brazilian former professional basketball player, professor, and coach. At a height of 2.16 m (7 ft 1 in) tall, he played at the center position.

== College career ==
Ferreira played college basketball at the University of Houston, with the Houston Cougars, for two seasons. As a senior co-captain of the 1987–88 Cougar squad, he averaged 15.8 points per game, and led the team with 6.8 rebounds and 1.6 blocked shots per game. For his efforts, he was named to the 1988 All-Southwest Conference defensive team.

== Professional playing career ==
Ferreira was selected by the Portland Trail Blazers, in the 2nd round (26th overall) of the 1988 NBA draft. Ferreira played in only one NBA season, as a member of the 1988–89 Blazers. In his NBA career, he played in 12 games, and scored a total of 9 points. He owns the distinction of being the first Brazilian to play in the NBA.

== National team playing career ==
Ferreira was a member of the senior Brazilian national basketball team for 12 years. He played at three FIBA World Cups, in 1986, 1990, and 1994, and at two Summer Olympic Games, in 1988 and 1992. He was also a part of the Brazilian team that won the 1987 Pan American Games, in Indianapolis, over Team USA.

== Career statistics ==
Legend
GP	Games played	GS	Games started	MPG	Minutes per game
FG%	Field goal percentage	3P%	3-point field goal percentage	FT%	Free throw percentage
RPG	Rebounds per game	APG	Assists per game	SPG	Steals per game
BPG	Blocks per game	PPG	Points per game	**Bold**	Career high

=== NBA ===
==== Regular season ====
Year	Team	GP	GS	MPG	FG%	3P%	FT%	RPG	APG	SPG	BPG	PPG
1988–89	Portland	12	—	2.8	.056	—	.875	.8	1.1	0.0	0.1	0.8

== Coaching career ==
After his playing career ended, Ferreira went on to work as coach at the Universidade Federal do Paraná. Today, he is a basketball coach at the International School Of Curitiba (ISC), in Curitiba-Paraná, Brazil.
