= Gilson de Jesus =

Brazilian basketball player

Gilson Trinidade de Jesus
Personal information
- Born: 8 February 1957 (age 69) Salvador, Brazil
- Listed height: 6 ft 6 in (1.98 m)
- Listed weight: 212 lb (96 kg)
- Position: Small forward

Career highlights
- 4× Brazilian champion (1974, 1975, 1977, 1981 II)

Gilson Trinidade de Jesus, also commonly known simply as Gilson de Jesus, or simply as Gilson (born 8 February 1957), is a Brazilian former professional basketball player.

== Career ==
During his pro club career, de Jesus won four Brazilian Championships, in the seasons 1974, 1975, 1977, and 1981 II. With the senior men's Brazilian national basketball team, de Jesus competed at the 1978 FIBA World Cup, the 1980 Summer Olympics, and the 1982 FIBA World Cup.
