= Sílvio Malvezi =

Brazilian basketball player

Personal information
- Born: 17 March 1960 (age 66) São Paulo, Brazil
- Listed height: 6 ft 9.5 in (2.07 m)
- Listed weight: 185 lb (84 kg)
- Position: Center

Career highlights
- 3× Brazilian champion (1980, 1981 II, 1983)

Sílvio Malvezi (alternate spelling: Malvesi, born 17 March 1960), or simply Sílvio, is a Brazilian former professional basketball player.

== Career ==
During his pro club career, Malvezi won 3 Brazilian Championships, in the seasons 1980, 1981 (II), and 1983. With the senior Brazilian national basketball team, Malvezi competed at the 1984 Summer Olympics, and the 1986 FIBA World Cup.
