= Sérgio Toledo Machado =

Brazilian basketball player (1945–2026)

Medal record

Men's basketball

Representing Brazil

FIBA World Cup
Bronze medal – third place	1967 Montevideo	

Sérgio "Macarrão" de Toledo Machado (24 February 1945 – 12 September 2026), also commonly known as Sérgio Macarrão, was a Brazilian professional basketball player.

== National team career ==
With the senior Brazilian national basketball team, Machado played at the 1967 FIBA World Cup, and the 1970 FIBA World Cup. He also played at the 1964 Summer Olympic Games, and the 1968 Summer Olympic Games.

== Personal life and death ==
Sérgio's brother, Renê Machado, was also a Brazilian club basketball player in the 1960s and 1970s. One of his nephews, Duda Machado, was also a basketball player with the senior men's Brazilian national basketball team. Another one of his nephews, Marcelinho Machado, was also a long-time professional basketball player, and he is one of the most well-known players Brazil ever produced.

Sérgio Toledo Machado died on 12 September 2026, at the age of 81.
