= Thales Monteiro =

Brazilian basketball player

Thales Monteiro (20 February 1925 – 2 April 1993) was a Brazilian basketball player who competed in the 1952 Summer Olympics.
