= Luiz Cláudio Menon =

Brazilian basketball player

Medal record

Men's basketball

Representing Brazil

World Championship
Gold medal – first place	1963 Rio de Janeiro	Team
Silver medal – second place	1970 Ljubljana	Team
Bronze medal – third place	1967 Montevideo	Team

Luiz Cláudio Menon (born February 7, 1944) is a former Brazilian basketball player. Menon participated at the 1963, 1967 and 1970 FIBA World Championships as well as at the 1968 and 1972 Summer Olympics with the Brazil national basketball team.
