= José Aparecido =

Brazilian basketball player (born 1946)

Personal information
- Born: 15 November 1946 (age 79) São Paulo, Brazil

Sport
- Sport: Basketball

José "Joy" Aparecido dos Santos, also commonly known as simply "Joy" (born 15 November 1946) is a Brazilian basketball player. He competed in the men's tournament at the 1968 Summer Olympics and the 1972 Summer Olympics.
