= Victor Mirshauswka =

Brazilian basketball player (born 1941)

Victor Mirshawka
Personal information
- Nationality: Brazilian
- Born: 27 April 1941 (age 84) Cherni, Belarusian SSR, Soviet Union

Sport
- Sport: Basketball

Victor Mirshawka (born 27 April 1941) is a Brazilian basketball player. He competed in the men's tournament at the 1964 Summer Olympics.
