= Jatyr Eduardo Schall =

Brazilian basketball player (born 1938)

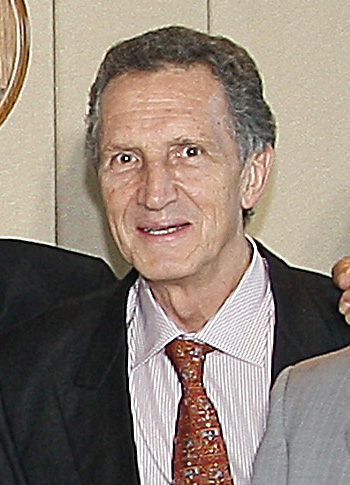

Personal information
- Born: 18 October 1938 (age 88) São Paulo, Brazil
- Listed height: 6 ft 1.75 in (1.87 m)
- Listed weight: 190 lb (86 kg)
- Position: Small forward
Medals
Men's basketball
Representing Brazil
Summer Olympic Games
Bronze medal – third place	1960 Rome	Team
Bronze medal – third place	1964 Tokyo	Team
FIBA World Cup
Gold medal – first place	1959 Chile	Team
Gold medal – first place	1963 Brazil	Team
Bronze medal – third place	1967 Uruguay	Team
Pan American Games
Bronze medal – third place	1959 Chicago	Team
FIBA South American Championship
Gold medal – first place	1958 Chile	Team
Gold medal – first place	1960 Argentina	Team
Gold medal – first place	1961 Brazil	Team

Jatyr Eduardo Schall (born 18 October 1938 in São Paulo), commonly known as Jatyr Schall, or simply as Jatyr, is a former Brazilian professional basketball player.

== National team career ==
With the senior Brazilian national basketball team, Jatyr won bronze medals at the 1960 Summer Olympic Games, and the 1964 Summer Olympic Games. He also won gold medals at the 1959 FIBA World Championship and 1963 FIBA World Championship, and a bronze medal at the 1967 FIBA World Championship.
