= José Edvar Simões =

Brazilian basketball player and coach

Medal record

Men's basketball

Representing Brazil

Olympic Games
Bronze medal – third place	1964 Tokyo	Team

World Championship
Bronze medal – third place	1967 Montevideo	Team
Silver medal – second place	1970 Ljubljana	Team

José Edvar Simões, also commonly known as Edvar Simões, (born 23 April 1943), is a former Brazilian professional basketball player and coach. Simões participated at the 1967 and 1970 FIBA World Championships with the Brazil national basketball team. He won a bronze medal at the 1964 Tokyo Olympics.
