= Jamil Gedeão =

Brazilian basketball player

Personal information
- Born: 19 April 1931 (age 93); Recife, Brazil

Sport
- Sport: Basketball

Jamil Gedeão (born 19 April 1931) is a Brazilian basketball player. He competed in the men's tournament at the 1956 Summer Olympics.
