= Alfredo da Motta =

Brazilian basketball player (1921–1998)

Personal information
- Born: 12 January 1921 Rio de Janeiro, Brazil
- Died: 22 April 1998 (aged 77) Rio de Janeiro, Brazil
Medals
Men's basketball
Representing Brazil
Olympic Games
Bronze medal – third place	1948 London	Team
World Championship
Silver medal – second place	1954 Rio de Janeiro	Team
Pan American Games
Bronze medal – third place	1951 Buenos Aires	Team

Alfredo Rodrigues da Motta (12 January 1921 – 22 April 1998) was a Brazilian basketball player, who competed in the 1948 Summer Olympics in London, United Kingdom, winning the bronze medal with the men's national team. He also was on the 1952 Olympic team that took sixth place. He was born in Rio de Janeiro.
