= Carlos Domingos Massoni =

Brazilian basketball player (1939–2026)

Personal information
- Born: 4 January 1939 São Paulo, Brazil
- Died: 13 August 2026 (aged 87)
- Listed height: 5 ft 11 in (1.80 m)
- Listed weight: 180 lb (82 kg)
- Position: Shooting guard
Medals
Men's basketball
Representing Brazil
Summer Olympics
| Bronze medal – third place | 1960 Rome |
| Bronze medal – third place | 1964 Tokyo |
FIBA World Cup
| Gold medal – first place | 1963 Rio de Janeiro |
| Silver medal – second place | 1970 Ljubljana |
| Bronze medal – third place | 1967 Montevideo |
Pan American Games
| Gold medal – first place | 1971 Cali |
| Silver medal – second place | 1963 São Paulo |
| Bronze medal – third place | 1959 Chicago |

Carlos Domingos Massoni (4 January 1939 – 13 August 2026), commonly known as Mosquito, was a Brazilian professional basketball player.

== National team career ==
Massoni played with the senior Brazilian national team at the 1963 FIBA World Cup, where he won a gold medal. He also won a silver medal at the 1970 FIBA World Cup. In addition, he also won bronze medals at the 1960 Summer Olympic Games, the 1964 Summer Olympic Games, and the 1967 FIBA World Cup.

== Death ==
Massoni died on 13 August 2026, at the age of 87.

== Sources ==
- (in Portuguese)
- Evans, Hilary; Gjerde, Arild; Heijmans, Jeroen; Mallon, Bill; et al. "Carlos "Mosquito" Domingos Massoni". Olympics at Sports-Reference.com. Sports Reference LLC.
