= Fausto Sucena Rasga Filho =

Brazilian basketball player

Personal information
- Born: 12 April 1929; São Paulo, Brazil
- Died: 30 July 2007 (aged 78)

Sport
- Sport: Basketball

Fausto Sucena Rasga Filho, also commonly known simply as Fausto (12 April 1929 – 30 July 2007), was a Brazilian basketball player. He competed in the men's tournament at the 1956 Summer Olympics.
