= Fernando Brobró =

Brazilian basketball player

Personal information
- Full name: Fernando Pereira de Freitas
- Born: 18 July 1934; Rio de Janeiro, Brazil
- Died: 10 February 2006 (aged 71); Rio de Janeiro, Brazil

Sport
- Sport: Basketball

Fernando Pereira de Freitas (18 July 1934 – 10 February 2006), also commonly known as Fernando Brobró was a Brazilian basketball player. He competed in the men's tournament at the 1960 Summer Olympics.
