= Friedrich Wilhelm Braun =

Brazilian basketball player (1941–2025)

Personal information
- Born: 18 July 1941; Rio de Janeiro, Brazil
- Died: 2 February 2025 (aged 83); Rio Claro, São Paulo, Brazil

Sport
- Sport: Basketball

Friedrich Wilhelm Braun (18 July 1941 – 2 February 2025), also commonly known simply as Fritz, was a Brazilian basketball player. He competed in the men's tournament at the 1964 Summer Olympics. Braun died in Rio Claro, São Paulo on 2 February 2025, at the age of 83.
