= Rosa Branca =

Brazilian basketball player and Olympian

Personal information
- Born: 19 July 1940 Araraquara, São Paulo, Brazil
- Died: 22 December 2008 (aged 68) São Paulo, Brazil
- Listed height: 190 cm (6 ft 3 in)
- Listed weight: 89 kg (196 lb)
Medals
Men's basketball
Representing Brazil
Olympic Games
Bronze medal – third place	1960 Rome	Team
Bronze medal – third place	1964 Tokyo	Team
FIBA World Cup
Gold medal – first place	1959 Chile	Team
Gold medal – first place	1963 Brazil	Team
Silver medal – second place	1970 Yugoslavia	Team
Pan American Games
Silver medal – second place	1963 São Paulo	Team
Bronze medal – third place	1959 Chicago	Team
FIBA South American Championship
Gold medal – first place	1958 Chile	Team
Gold medal – first place	1960 Argentina	Team
Gold medal – first place	1961 Brazil	Team
Gold medal – first place	1968 Paraguay	Team

Carmo de Souza (19 July 1940 – 22 December 2008), commonly known as "Rosa Branca" ("White Rose"), was a Brazilian basketball player with the Brazil national basketball team. De Souza competed with Brazil at the 1959, 1963 and 1970 FIBA World Championships and won two bronze medals at the 1960 and 1964 Summer Olympics. He was born in Araraquara.
