= Ângelo Bonfietti =

Brazilian basketball player

Ângelo "Angelim" Bonfietti, also commonly known simply as Angelim (6 August 1926 – 10 October 2004) was a Brazilian basketball player who competed in the 1952 Summer Olympics and in the 1956 Summer Olympics.
