= Cadum =

Brazilian basketball player (born 1959)

Personal information
- Born: 4 October 1959 (age 67) São Paulo, Brazil
- Listed height: 6 ft 6.75 in (2.00 m)
- Listed weight: 203 lb (92 kg)
- Position: Point guard / shooting guard

Career highlights
- 2× South American Club champion (1985, 1986); 5× Brazilian champion (1982, 1985, 1986 (I), 1986 (II), 1987)

Ricardo Cardoso Guimarães (born 4 October 1959), commonly known as Cadum, is a Brazilian former professional basketball player and coach.

== Professional playing career ==
During his pro club career, Cadum won 5 Brazilian Championships, in the seasons 1982, 1985, 1986 (I), 1986 (II), 1987. He won all of the Brazilian championships as a member of C.A. Monte Líbano.

== National team playing career ==
With the senior Brazilian national basketball team, Cadum competed at the following major world tournaments: the 1980 Summer Olympics, the 1982 FIBA World Cup, the 1984 Summer Olympics, the 1988 Summer Olympics, the 1990 FIBA World Cup, and the 1992 Summer Olympics.

== Coaching career ==
After his basketball playing career ended, Cadum began a career working as a basketball coach.
