= Waldyr Boccardo =

Brazilian basketball player

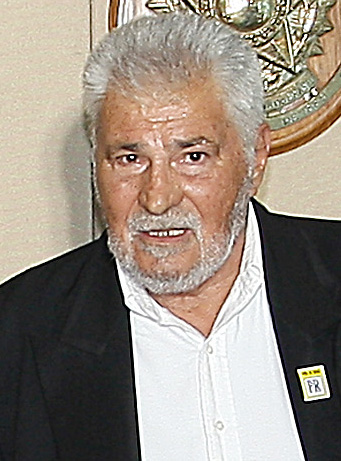

Personal information
- Born: 28 January 1936; São Manuel, Brazil
- Died: 18 November 2018 (aged 82); Rio de Janeiro, Brazil
Medals
Men's basketball
Representing Brazil
Olympic Games
Bronze medal – third place	1960 Rome	Team
World Championship
Gold medal – first place	1959 Santiago de Chile	Team

Waldyr Geraldo Boccardo (alternate spelling: Waldir) (28 January 1936 – 18 November 2018) was a Brazilian basketball player. He was a member of the team that won the title at the 1959 World Championship and the bronze medal at the 1960 Olympics.

Boccardo was born in São Manuel, and died, aged 82, in Rio de Janeiro.
