= Moacyr Daiuto =

Brazilian basketball coach

Moacyr Brondi Daiuto, commonly known as Moacyr Daiuto (July 19, 1915 – 1994) was a Brazilian basketball coach, who guided the men's national team to the bronze medal at the 1948 Summer Olympics in London, United Kingdom. As an assistant-coach he led the team to the silver medal at the 1963 Pan American Games in São Paulo. He was born in Altinópolis.
