= Mayr Facci =

Brazilian basketball player

Personal information
- Born: 7 April 1927 ?, Brazil
- Died: 11 March 2015 (aged 87); Ponta Grossa, Brazil

Sport
- Sport: Basketball

Mayr Facci (7 April 1927 – 11 March 2015) was a Brazilian basketball player. He competed in the men's tournament at the 1952 Summer Olympics and the 1956 Summer Olympics.
