= Almir Nelson de Almeida =

Brazilian basketball player

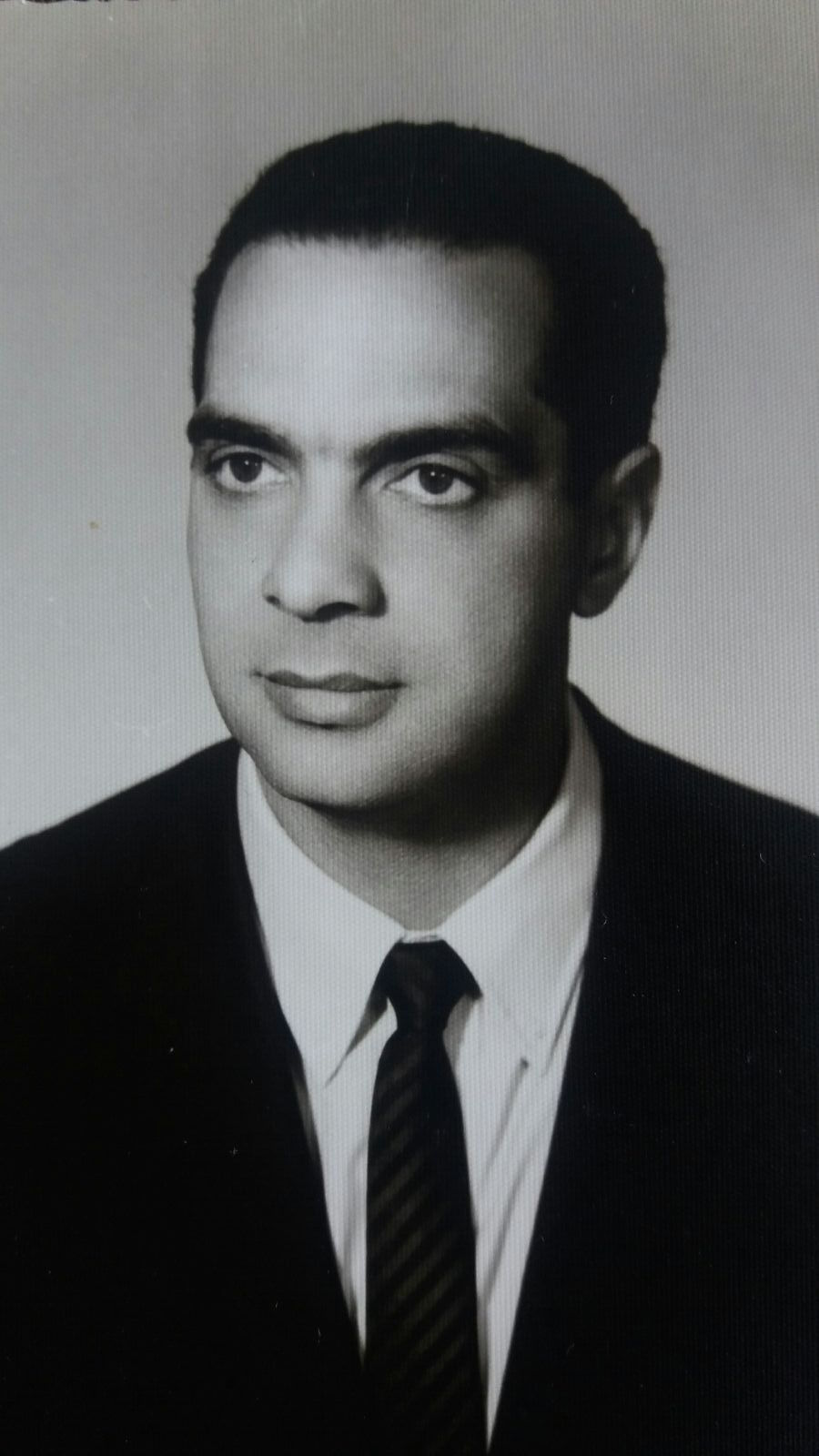
Almir Nelson de Almeida

Almir Nelson de Almeida, also commonly known simply as Almir (2 September 1923 – 14 April 1977), was a Brazilian basketball player who competed in the 1952 Summer Olympics. He was born in Salvador - Bahia.
