= Wilson Bombarda =

Brazilian basketball player (1930–2026)

Personal information
- Born: 7 October 1930 Lins, São Paulo, Brazil
- Died: 25 March 2026 (aged 95)

Sport
- Sport: Basketball

Wilson Bombarda (7 October 1930 – 25 March 2026) was a Brazilian basketball player. He competed in the men's tournament at the 1956 Summer Olympics. Bombarda died on 25 March 2026, at the age of 95.
