= Algodão =

Brazilian basketball player (1925–2001)

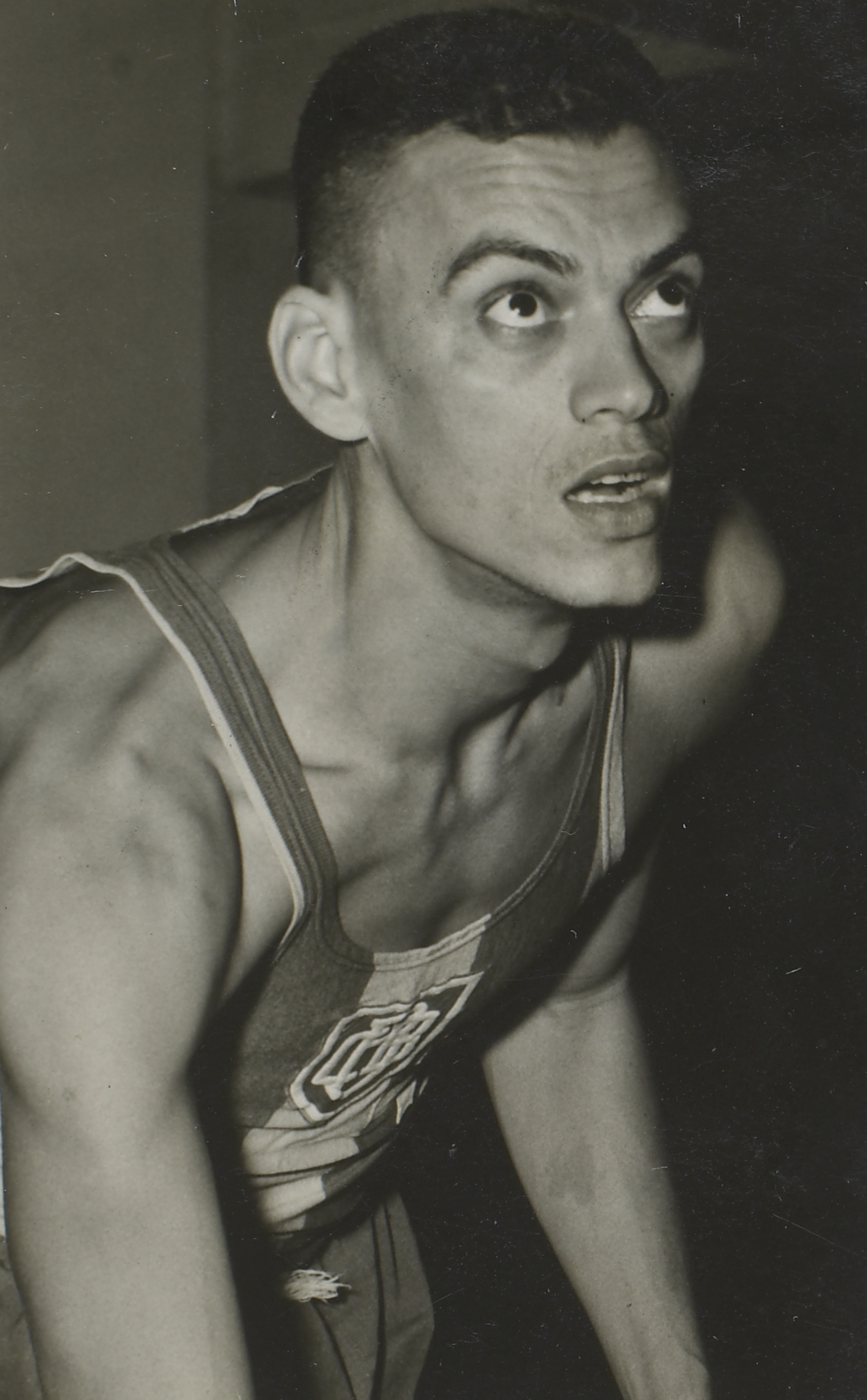

Personal information
- Born: 1 March 1925 Rio de Janeiro, Brazil
- Died: 10 March 2001 (aged 76) Rio de Janeiro, Brazil
- Listed height: 183 cm (6 ft 0 in)
- Listed weight: 77 kg (170 lb)
Medals
Men's basketball
Representing Brazil
Olympic Games
Bronze medal – third place	1948 London	Team
Bronze medal – third place	1960 Rome	Team
World Championship
Silver medal – second place	1954 Rio de Janeiro	Team
Gold medal – first place	1959 Santiago de Chile	Team
Pan American Games
Bronze medal – third place	1951 Buenos Aires	Team
Bronze medal – third place	1955 Mexico City	Team
Bronze medal – third place	1959 Chicago	Team

Zenny de Azevedo (1 March 1925 – 10 March 2001), commonly known as Algodão ("Cotton"), was a Brazilian basketball player, who competed for his native country in four consecutive Summer Olympics, starting in 1948. He won the bronze medal in 1948 and 1960 with the Brazilian basketball team. He was born in Rio de Janeiro.
