= Basketball at the 1987 Pan American Games =

- Venue: Market Square Arena
- Dates: August 9–23, 1987
- Teams: 10

Medalists
Gold medal	Brazil
Silver medal	United States
Bronze medal	Puerto Rico

Basketball at the 1987 Pan American Games was held from August 9 to August 23, 1987, at the Market Square Arena in Indianapolis, United States. In men's basketball, Brazil defeated the U.S. 120–115 in the final to win the gold medal. The Brazilian team was led by their star player Oscar, who scored 46 points in the final.

Likewise, the women's basketball tournament was held from August 9 to August 23, 1987, at the same venue.

== Men's competition ==
=== Participating nations ===
Group A	Group B
Argentina; Mexico; Panama; United States; Venezuela	Brazil; Canada; Puerto Rico; Uruguay; Virgin Islands

=== Preliminary round ===
==== Group A ====
Pos	Team	Pld	W	L	PF	PA	PD	Pts	Qualification
1	United States	4	4	0	390	268	+122	8	Semifinals
2	Venezuela	4	3	1	321	343	−22	7	Semifinals
3	Panama	4	2	2	302	295	+7	6	Semifinals
4	Mexico	4	1	3	313	363	−50	5	Semifinals
5	Argentina	4	0	4	276	333	−57	4	Ninth place game

Report

United States	91–63	Panama

Market Square Arena

Report

Venezuela	87–84	Mexico

Market Square Arena

Report

United States	85–58	Argentina

Market Square Arena

Report

Panama	86–60	Mexico

Market Square Arena

Report

Venezuela	78–71	Argentina

Market Square Arena

Report

United States	105–73	Mexico

Market Square Arena

Report

Panama	74–62	Argentina

Market Square Arena

Report

United States	109–74	Venezuela

Market Square Arena

Report

Mexico	96–85	Argentina

Market Square Arena

Report

Venezuela	82–79	Panama

Market Square Arena

==== Group B ====
Pos	Team	Pld	W	L	PF	PA	PD	Pts	Qualification
1	Canada	4	3	1	356	325	+31	7	Semifinals
2	Puerto Rico	4	3	1	370	336	+34	7	Semifinals
3	Brazil	4	3	1	402	367	+35	7	Semifinals
4	Uruguay	4	1	3	297	356	−59	5	Semifinals
5	Virgin Islands	4	0	4	327	368	−41	4	Ninth place game

Report

Canada	88–73	Uruguay

Market Square Arena

Report

Puerto Rico	100–79	Virgin Islands

Market Square Arena

Report

Canada	92–78	Virgin Islands

Market Square Arena

Report

Brazil	111–79	Uruguay

Market Square Arena

Report

Brazil	100–99	Puerto Rico

Market Square Arena

Report

Uruguay	73–72	Virgin Islands

Market Square Arena

Report

Puerto Rico	86–85 (OT)	Canada

Market Square Arena

Report

Brazil	103–98	Virgin Islands

Market Square Arena

Report

Canada	91–88	Brazil

Market Square Arena

Report

Puerto Rico	85–72	Uruguay

Market Square Arena

=== Knockout round ===
==== Quarterfinals ====
Report

United States	105–81	Uruguay

Market Square Arena

Report

Brazil	131–84	Venezuela

Market Square Arena

Report

Puerto Rico	78–77	Panama

Market Square Arena

Report

Mexico	110–101	Canada

Market Square Arena

==== 5th to 8th place semifinals ====
Report

Panama	87–81	Uruguay

Market Square Arena

Report

Canada	90–86	Venezuela

Market Square Arena

==== Semifinals ====
Report

United States	80–75	Puerto Rico

Market Square Arena

Report

Brazil	137–116	Mexico

Market Square Arena

==== Ninth place match ====
Report

Argentina	101–90	Virgin Islands

Market Square Arena

==== Seventh place match ====
Report

Uruguay	87–73	Venezuela

Market Square Arena

==== Fifth place match ====
Report

Canada	120–118	Panama

Market Square Arena

==== Bronze medal match ====
Report

Puerto Rico	102–100	Mexico

Market Square Arena

==== Gold medal match ====
Report

Brazil	120–115	United States

Market Square Arena

=== Final ranking ===
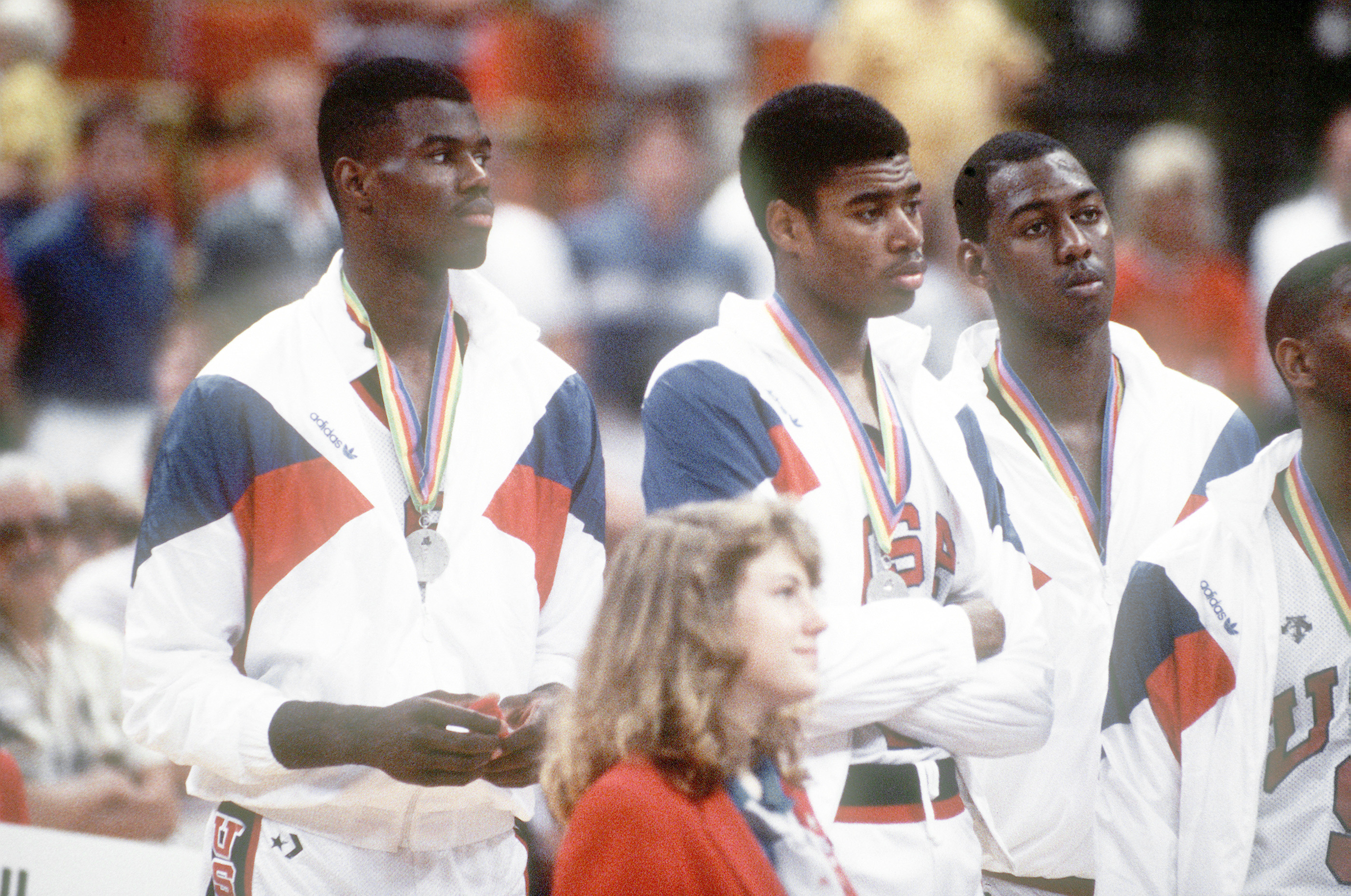
David Robinson (left), Danny Manning (center right) and other players of the U.S. with silver medals

Rank	Team
1.	Brazil
2.	United States
3.	Puerto Rico
4.	Mexico
5.	Canada
6.	Panama
7.	Uruguay
8.	Venezuela
9.	Argentina
10.	Virgin Islands

=== Awards ===
==== Topscorer ====
- (Brazil) Oscar Schmidt 246 pts

1987 Pan American Games winners

Brazil
Second title

Basketball at the 1987 Pan American Games
- Venue: Market Square Arena
- Dates: August 9–23, 1987
- Teams: 10

Medalists
Gold medal	United States
Silver medal	Brazil
Bronze medal	Canada

== Women's competition ==
=== Participating nations ===
Group A	Group B
Brazil; Dominican Republic; Peru; United States	Canada; Colombia; Cuba; Mexico

=== Preliminary Round ===
==== Group A ====
Pos	Team	Pld	W	L	PF	PA	PD	Pts	Qualification
1	United States	2	2	0	194	122	+72	4	Semifinals
2	Brazil	2	1	1	198	132	+66	3	Quarterfinals
3	Peru	2	0	2	89	227	−138	2	Quarterfinals
4	Dominican Republic	0	0	0	0	0	0	0	withdrew

Report

United States	110–41	Peru

Market Square Arena

Report

Brazil	117–48	Peru

Market Square Arena

Report

United States	84–81	Brazil

Market Square Arena

==== Group B ====
Pos	Team	Pld	W	L	PF	PA	PD	Pts	Qualification
1	Canada	3	3	0	275	204	+71	6	Semifinals
2	Cuba	3	2	1	289	236	+53	5	Quarterfinals
3	Mexico	3	1	2	203	233	−30	4	Quarterfinals
4	Colombia	3	0	3	168	262	−94	3	

Report

Cuba	102–69	Colombia

Market Square Arena

Report

Canada	94–57	Mexico

Market Square Arena

Report

Cuba	90–49	Mexico

Market Square Arena

Report

Canada	83–50	Colombia

Market Square Arena

Report

Canada	98–97	Cuba

Market Square Arena

Report

Mexico	77–49	Colombia

Market Square Arena

=== Knockout round ===
==== Quarterfinals ====
Report

Brazil	113–64	Mexico

Market Square Arena

Report

Cuba	125–41	Peru

Market Square Arena

==== Semifinals ====
Report

United States	85–80	Cuba

Market Square Arena

Report

Brazil	79–78	Canada

Market Square Arena

==== Fifth place match ====
Report

Mexico	91–70	Peru

Market Square Arena

==== Bronze medal match ====
Report

Canada	78–73	Cuba

Market Square Arena

==== Gold medal match ====
Report

United States	111–87	Brazil

Market Square Arena

=== Final ranking ===
Rank	Team
1.	United States
2.	Brazil
3.	Canada
4.	Cuba
5.	Mexico
6.	Peru
7.	Colombia

=== Awards ===
1987 Pan American Games winners

United States
Sixth title
