= 2025 FIBA AmeriCup qualification =

International qualification tournament

Tournament details
- Dates: 22 February 2023 – 24 February 2025
- Teams: 25

Official website
- Qualifiers website Pre-qualifiers website South American pre-qualifiers website Central American pre-qualifiers website

The 2025 FIBA AmeriCup qualification was a basketball competition that was played from February 2023 to February 2025, to determine the eleven FIBA Americas nations who would join the automatically qualified host Nicaragua at the 2025 FIBA AmeriCup.

== Sub-zone pre-qualifiers ==
=== Central America ===
The tournament was held in Managua, Nicaragua.

All times are local (UTC−6).

Pos	Team	Pld	W	L	PF	PA	PD	Pts	Qualification
1	Nicaragua (H)	4	4	0	325	237	+88	8	Pre-qualifiers
2	Costa Rica	4	3	1	315	298	+17	7	
3	Honduras	4	2	2	247	269	−22	6	
4	El Salvador	4	1	3	277	304	−27	5	
5	Guatemala	4	0	4	244	300	−56	4	

Source: FIBA
Rules for classification: 1) points; 2) head-to-head points; 3) head-to-head points difference; 4) head-to-head number of points scored.
(H) Hosts

22 February 2023	El Salvador	97–101(2OT)	Costa Rica	Managua
15:30	Scoring by quarter: 23–17, 16–10, 22–13, 12–33, Overtime: 15–15, 9–13
	Pts: Martínez 28; Rebs: Arias 20; Asts: Escalante 7	Boxscore	Pts: Dav. Shedden 22; Rebs: Quesada 17; Asts: Conejo 9	Arena: Polideportivo Alexis Argüello; Attendance: 150; Referees: Jesed Díaz (PUR), Juan Valenzuela (MEX), Kevin Lei (CAN)

22 February 2023	Nicaragua	91–65	Honduras	Managua
19:00	Scoring by quarter: 22–14, 20–10, 26–20, 23–21
	Pts: Ruiz 21; Rebs: López 18; Asts: Ponce 9	Boxscore	Pts: Forbs, Lucas 13; Rebs: Forbs, Lucas 6 Asts: Alfaro 5	Arena: Polideportivo Alexis Argüello; Attendance: 500; Referees: Gustavo Mathias (BRA), Carmelo de la Rosa (PUR), Samuel Hidalgo (DOM)

23 February 2023	Honduras	65–51	El Salvador	Managua
15:30	Scoring by quarter: 18–16, 19–8, 17–14, 11–13
	Pts: Lucas 16; Rebs: Ramon 11; Asts: Lucas 5	Boxscore	Pts: García 14; Rebs: Arias 13; Asts: Escalante 5	Arena: Polideportivo Alexis Argüello; Attendance: 150; Referees: Gustavo Mathias (BRA), Yezid Carreño (VEN), Carmelo de la Rosa (PUR)

23 February 2023	Guatemala	59–77	Nicaragua	Managua
19:00	Scoring by quarter: 11–22, 10–21, 18–13, 20–21
	Pts: Esquivel 18; Rebs: Esquivel 20; Asts: Tuchan 4	Boxscore	Pts: Ruiz 18; Rebs: Ruiz 7 Asts: Hodgson 5	Arena: Polideportivo Alexis Argüello; Attendance: 2,000; Referees: Jesed Díaz (PUR), Kevin Lei (CAN), Samuel Hidalgo (DOM)

24 February 2023	El Salvador	80–61	Guatemala	Managua
15:30	Scoring by quarter: 22–16, 17–13, 17–10, 24–22
	Pts: Arias 24; Rebs: Arias 13; Asts: Escalante 8	Boxscore	Pts: three players 15; Rebs: Esquivel 22; Asts: three players 3	Arena: Polideportivo Alexis Argüello; Attendance: 150; Referees: Jesed Díaz (PUR), Yezid Carreño (VEN), Juan Valenzuela (MEX)

24 February 2023	Costa Rica	69–55	Honduras	Managua
19:00	Scoring by quarter: 23–10, 12–15, 19–21, 15–9
	Pts: Quesada 16; Rebs: Conejo, McDonald 8 Asts: Conejo 8	Boxscore	Pts: Lucas 14; Rebs: Lucas 9 Asts: four players 2	Arena: Polideportivo Alexis Argüello; Attendance: 150; Referees: Carmelo de la Rosa (PUR), Gustavo Mathias (BRA), Kevin Lei (CAN)

25 February 2023	Guatemala	66–81	Costa Rica	Managua
15:30	Scoring by quarter: 10–24, 23–15, 11–30, 22–22
	Pts: Monterroso 19; Rebs: Esquivel 13; Asts: González 6	Boxscore	Pts: Quesada 15; Rebs: Conejo 11; Asts: Conejo 13	Arena: Polideportivo Alexis Argüello; Attendance: 150; Referees: Jesed Díaz (PUR), Yezid Carreño (VEN), Samuel Hidalgo (DOM)

25 February 2023	Nicaragua	77–49	El Salvador	Managua
19:00	Scoring by quarter: 24–4, 16–12, 23–18, 14–15
	Pts: Ruiz 27; Rebs: Cacho 13; Asts: Ruiz 6	Boxscore	Pts: Escalante 14; Rebs: Arias 10; Asts: Arias 4	Arena: Polideportivo Alexis Argüello; Attendance: 2,500; Referees: Carmelo de la Rosa (PUR), Gustavo Mathias (BRA), Kevin Lei (CAN)

26 February 2023	Honduras	62–58	Guatemala	Managua
15:30	Scoring by quarter: 19–14, 20–15, 12–17, 11–12
	Pts: Lucas 21; Rebs: Forbs, Williams 9 Asts: Alfaro 5	Boxscore	Pts: Monterroso 16; Rebs: Esquivel 16; Asts: Chur, Guerra 3	Arena: Polideportivo Alexis Argüello; Attendance: 150; Referees: Jesed Díaz (PUR), Kevin Lei (CAN), Juan Valenzuela (MEX)

26 February 2023	Costa Rica	64–80	Nicaragua	Managua
19:00	Scoring by quarter: 15–19, 11–23, 21–17, 17–21
	Pts: Arias, Dan. Shedden 17; Rebs: Dav. Shedden 8 Asts: Conejo 7	Boxscore	Pts: Ruiz 31; Rebs: López 15; Asts: Ruiz 5	Arena: Polideportivo Alexis Argüello; Attendance: 2,000; Referees: Carmelo de la Rosa (PUR), Yezid Carreño (VEN), Gustavo Mathias (BRA)

=== South America ===
Two teams entered the South American pre-qualifiers. Bolivia and Ecuador played a two-legged match with the overall winner advancing to the pre-qualifiers.

Team 1	Agg.	Team 2	1st leg	2nd leg
Ecuador	171–154	Bolivia	90–68	81–86

23 May 2023	Ecuador	90–68	Bolivia	Ibarra
20:00	Scoring by quarter: 18–14, 19–26, 22–16, 31–12
	Pts: Barahona 19; Rebs: Cardenas 13; Asts: Martinez 6	Boxscore	Pts: Calvo 19; Rebs: Calvo 8 Asts: Arze 8	Arena: Coliseo Luis Leoro Franco; Attendance: 0 Referees: Julio Anaya (PAN), Franco Anselmo (ARG), Ramiro Marques (BRA)

27 May 2023	Bolivia	86–81	Ecuador	Tarija
20:00	Scoring by quarter: 10–26, 23–21, 26–13, 27–21
	Pts: Arze 23; Rebs: Stark 8 Asts: Arze 7	Boxscore	Pts: Barahona 13; Rebs: Torres 11; Asts: Riascos 4	Arena: Coliseo de Basquetbol Guadalquivir; Attendance: 1,500; Referees: Andrés Bartel (URU), Leonardo Zalazar (ARG), Gustavo Mthias (BRA)

=== Caribbean ===
Antigua and Barbuda and Barbados were the two countries qualified based on their high rankings. The automatic qualification came after a host country could not be found.

== Pre-qualifiers ==
The eight participating teams were divided into two groups: Group A in Chile and Group B in Nicaragua. Each team will play against the rest of the teams in its group (total of three games per team). The best two teams in each of the groups will automatically qualify for the FIBA AmeriCup 2025 Qualifiers, beginning in February 2024.

Entrance/qualification method	Team(s)
Eliminated from the 2023 FIBA Basketball World Cup qualification first round	Paraguay; Chile; Virgin Islands; Cuba
Qualified from the sub-zone pre-qualifiers	Nicaragua; Ecuador; Barbados; Antigua and Barbuda

=== Group A ===
Pos	Team	Pld	W	L	PF	PA	PD	Pts	Qualification
1	Chile (H)	3	3	0	275	158	+117	6	Qualifiers
2	Paraguay	3	2	1	193	241	−48	5	Qualifiers
3	Barbados	3	1	2	223	256	−33	4	
4	Ecuador	3	0	3	220	256	−36	3	

Source: FIBA
Rules for classification: 1) points; 2) head-to-head points; 3) head-to-head points difference; 4) head-to-head number of points scored.
(H) Hosts

All times are local (UTC−4).

23 June 2023	Paraguay	80–70	Barbados	Valdivia, Chile
18:30	Scoring by quarter: 15–16, 21–12, 19–30, 25–12
	Pts: Mercado 33; Rebs: López 8 Asts: Martínez 7	Boxscore	Pts: Alexander 20; Rebs: Thomas 9 Asts: Lockhart, Thomas 3	Arena: Coliseo Municipal Antonio Azurmendy Riveros; Attendance: 1,000; Referees: Marcos Benito (BRA), Franco Ronconi (ARG), Gonzalo Salgueiro (URU)

23 June 2023	Chile	85–63	Ecuador	Valdivia
21:30	Scoring by quarter: 18–15, 26–12, 25–19, 16–17
	Pts: Herrera 20; Rebs: Carvacho, Herrera 8 Asts: Arroyo 5	Boxscore	Pts: Barreras 18; Rebs: Guerra 9 Asts: four players 2	Arena: Coliseo Municipal Antonio Azurmendy Riveros; Attendance: 2,300; Referees: Juan Fernández (ARG), Fernando Leite (BRA), Yezid Carreño (COL)

24 June 2023	Barbados	48–78	Chile	Valdivia, Chile
19:00	Scoring by quarter: 14–17, 12–29, 8–20, 14–12
	Pts: Alexander 10; Rebs: Alexander 7 Asts: Adams, Birkett 2	Boxscore	Pts: Carvacho 20; Rebs: Pickett 8 Asts: Arroyo 6	Arena: Coliseo Municipal Antonio Azurmendy Riveros; Attendance: 2,500; Referees: Marcos Benito (BRA), Franco Ronconi (ARG), Yezid Carreño (COL)

24 June 2023	Ecuador	59–66	Paraguay	Valdivia, Chile
21:30	Scoring by quarter: 19–21, 7–18, 16–16, 17–11
	Pts: Castillo 16; Rebs: Castillo 12; Asts: Guerra 5	Boxscore	Pts: Mercado 19; Rebs: Poisson 13; Asts: Martínez 5	Arena: Coliseo Municipal Antonio Azurmendy Riveros; Attendance: 1,000; Referees: Juan Fernández (ARG), Fernando Leite (BRA), Gonzalo Salgueiro (URU)

25 June 2023	Chile	112–47	Paraguay	Valdivia
19:00	Scoring by quarter: 24–10, 30–18, 28–4, 30–15
	Pts: Carrasco 18; Rebs: Herrera 6 Asts: Arroyo 6	Boxscore	Pts: Ferreira, Sequera 8 Rebs: Roque 4 Asts: Martínez 5	Arena: Coliseo Municipal Antonio Azurmendy Riveros; Attendance: 2,800; Referees: Marcos Benito (BRA), Fernando Leite (BRA), Gonzalo Salgueiro (URU)

25 June 2023	Barbados	105–98(OT)	Ecuador	Valdivia, Chile
21:30	Scoring by quarter: 29–22, 19–24, 17–26, 23–16, Overtime: 17–10
	Pts: Alexander 30; Rebs: Alexander, Thomas 6 Asts: Hurley 6	Boxscore	Pts: Castillo 29; Rebs: Cárdenas 14; Asts: Barreras 8	Arena: Coliseo Municipal Antonio Azurmendy Riveros; Attendance: 1,000; Referees: Juan Valenzuela (MEX), Franco Ronconi (ARG), Yezid Carreño (COL)

=== Group B ===
Pos	Team	Pld	W	L	PF	PA	PD	Pts	Qualification
1	Nicaragua (H)	3	3	0	232	213	+19	6	Qualifiers
2	Cuba	3	2	1	244	194	+50	5	Qualifiers
3	Virgin Islands	3	1	2	193	201	−8	4	
4	Antigua and Barbuda	3	0	3	178	239	−61	3	

Source: FIBA
Rules for classification: 1) points; 2) head-to-head points; 3) head-to-head points difference; 4) head-to-head number of points scored.
(H) Hosts

All times are local (UTC−6).

23 June 2023	Cuba	72–63	Virgin Islands	Managua, Nicaragua
15:30	Scoring by quarter: 19–25, 22–13, 16–12, 15–13
	Pts: Rivero 13; Rebs: three players 8 Asts: Chacón 5	Boxscore	Pts: Aska 20; Rebs: Corbett 10; Asts: Lopez Jr. 4	Arena: Polideportivo Alexis Argüello; Referees: Diego Chiconato (BRA), Franco Anselmo (ARG), Kevin Lei (CAN)

23 June 2023	Nicaragua	79–71	Antigua and Barbuda	Managua
19:00	Scoring by quarter: 21–16, 13–17, 30–18, 15–20
	Pts: Ruiz 41; Rebs: López 13; Asts: Ruiz 5	Boxscore	Pts: Braithwaite 16; Rebs: Charles 12; Asts: Andrew, Braithwaite 3	Arena: Polideportivo Alexis Argüello; Referees: Julio Anaya (PAN), Williset Del Valle (PUR), Samuel Hidalgo (DOM)

24 June 2023	Antigua and Barbuda	53–97	Cuba	Managua, Nicaragua
15:30	Scoring by quarter: 14–21, 16–26, 12–30, 11–20
	Pts: Jackson 14; Rebs: Jackson 12; Asts: Andrew 5	Boxscore	Pts: Rivero 15; Rebs: Mensia 7 Asts: Guzmán 7	Arena: Polideportivo Alexis Argüello; Referees: Julio Anaya (PAN), Franco Anselmo (ARG), Samuel Hidalgo (DOM)

24 June 2023	Virgin Islands	67–75	Nicaragua	Managua, Nicaragua
19:00	Scoring by quarter: 17–16, 19–19, 14–21, 17–19
	Pts: Aska 19; Rebs: Jules 11; Asts: Nesbitt 3	Boxscore	Pts: Ruiz 37; Rebs: López 12; Asts: Ruiz 7	Arena: Polideportivo Alexis Argüello; Referees: Diego Chiconato (BRA), Williset Del Valle (PUR), Kevin Lei (CAN)

25 June 2023	Antigua and Barbuda	54–63	Virgin Islands	Managua, Nicaragua
15:30	Scoring by quarter: 11–19, 14–11, 13–12, 16–21
	Pts: Charles 16; Rebs: Desouza 12; Asts: Andrew 3	Boxscore	Pts: Hansen 19; Rebs: Hansen 10; Asts: Arnold, Corbett 4	Arena: Polideportivo Alexis Argüello; Referees: Franco Anselmo (ARG), Kevin Lei (CAN), Williset Del Valle (PUR)

25 June 2023	Nicaragua	78–75	Cuba	Managua
19:00	Scoring by quarter: 19–23, 26–19, 16–15, 17–18
	Pts: Ruiz 34; Rebs: Garth 9 Asts: Garth, Ruiz 3	Boxscore	Pts: Cubilla 18; Rebs: Chacón, Cubilla 7 Asts: three players 3	Arena: Polideportivo Alexis Argüello; Referees: Julio Anaya (PAN), Diego Chiconato (BRA), Samuel Hidalgo (DOM)

== Qualifiers ==
12 teams from the 2023 FIBA Basketball World Cup qualification were directly qualified and joined by the four teams qualifying from the pre-qualifiers. They were drawn into four groups of four teams and played a home-and-away format. The top three teams of Groups A, B, and D, as well as the top two teams of Group C qualified for the final tournament.

Entrance/qualification method	Team(s)
Qualified from 2023 FIBA Basketball World Cup qualification second round	Canada; United States; Dominican Republic; Puerto Rico; Venezuela; Mexico; Brazil; Argentina; Uruguay; Panama; Bahamas; Colombia
Qualified from the pre-qualifiers	Chile; Nicaragua; Cuba; Paraguay

=== Draw ===
The draw was held on 9 August 2023.

==== Seeding ====
The seedings were announced on 2 August 2023. Teams were seeded based on geographical principles and FIBA rankings. Teams from pots 1, 3, 5, and 7 were drawn to Groups A and B, while teams from pots 2, 4, 6, and 8 were drawn to Groups C and D.

Pot 1
Team	Pos
Argentina	2
Brazil	3

Pot 5
Team	Pos
Panama	10
Colombia	11

Pot 2
Team	Pos
United States	1
Canada	4

Pot 6
Team	Pos
Mexico	8
Bahamas	13

Pot 3
Team	Pos
Venezuela	5
Uruguay	9

Pot 7
Team	Pos
Chile	14
Paraguay	16

Pot 4
Team	Pos
Puerto Rico	6
Dominican Republic	7

Pot 8
Team	Pos
Cuba	15
Nicaragua	17

All times are local.

=== Group A ===
Pos	Team	Pld	W	L	PF	PA	PD	Pts	Qualification
1	Argentina	6	4	2	489	435	+54	10	2025 FIBA AmeriCup
2	Venezuela	6	3	3	405	421	−16	9 (Note: Head-to-head points scored: Venezuela 143–127 Colombia.)	2025 FIBA AmeriCup
3	Colombia	6	3	3	454	494	−40	9	2025 FIBA AmeriCup
4	Chile	6	2	4	480	478	+2	8	

Source: FIBA
Rules for classification: 1) points; 2) head-to-head points; 3) head-to-head points difference; 4) head-to-head number of points scored.
Notes:

22 February 2024	Venezuela	79–60	Colombia	Maiquetía
18:30	Scoring by quarter: 24–16, 23–18, 19–16, 13–10
	Pts: Carrera 19; Rebs: three players 6 Asts: Chourio, Vargas 5	Boxscore	Pts: Atencia 16; Rebs: Almanza, Echenique 7 Asts: Roque, Tello 3	Arena: Domo José María Vargas; Attendance: 5,237; Referees: Carlos Peralta (ECU), Nicolás Flores (PAR), Ramiro Marques (BRA)

22 February 2024	Argentina	90–78	Chile	Mar del Plata
21:40	Scoring by quarter: 30–15, 20–28, 22–16, 18–19
	Pts: Brussino 19; Rebs: Deck 10; Asts: Campazzo 8	Boxscore	Pts: Suárez 25; Rebs: Suárez 12; Asts: Morales 5	Arena: Polideportivo Islas Malvinas; Attendance: 3,953; Referees: Andrés Bartel (URU), Kristian Páez (ECU), Fernando Leite (BRA)

25 February 2024	Colombia	67–64	Venezuela	Medellín
18:10	Scoring by quarter: 20–14, 17–16, 19–18, 11–16
	Pts: Ibargüen, Roque 13; Rebs: Almanza 9 Asts: Roque 5	Boxscore	Pts: Vargas 16; Rebs: Carrera, Colmenares 8 Asts: Vargas 6	Arena: Coliseo Iván de Bedout; Attendance: 5,000; Referees: Andrés Bartel (URU), Waseem Husainy (CAN), Edwin Quiles (PUR)

25 February 2024	Chile	79–77	Argentina	Valdivia
21:20	Scoring by quarter: 26–11, 27–31, 6–18, 20–17
	Pts: Suárez 29; Rebs: Haase, Suárez 9 Asts: Morales 6	Boxscore	Pts: Deck 20; Rebs: Brussino, Deck 7 Asts: Campazzo 9	Arena: Coliseo Municipal Antonio Azurmendy Riveros; Attendance: 3,825; Referees: Krishna Domínguez (MEX), Alexis Mercado (PUR), Nicolás Flores (PAR)

22 November 2024	Chile	74–80	Colombia	Valdivia
20:00	Scoring by quarter: 21–20, 11–22, 21–12, 21–26
	Pts: Herrera 21; Rebs: Suárez 11; Asts: Varela 9	Boxscore	Pts: Wright 25; Rebs: Ibargüen, Palacios 7 Asts: Atencia 4	Arena: Coliseo Municipal Antonio Azurmendy Riveros; Attendance: 2,765; Referees: Grant Todey (USA), Fernando Leite (BRA), Samuel Hidalgo (DOM)

22 November 2024	Argentina	72–61	Venezuela	Mar del Plata
22:15	Scoring by quarter: 21–13, 20–11, 16–18, 15–19
	Pts: Fernández 20; Rebs: Fernández 8 Asts: Brussino 3	Boxscore	Pts: Carrera 19; Rebs: Carrera 7 Asts: Guerra 4	Arena: Polideportivo Islas Malvinas; Attendance: 4,232; Referees: Johnny Batista (PUR), Nicolás Flores (PAR), Diego Chiconato (BRA)

25 November 2024	Chile	86–61	Venezuela	Valdivia
20:00	Scoring by quarter: 22–20, 33–11, 13–11, 18–19
	Pts: Carrasco 15; Rebs: Suárez 8 Asts: Herrera 5	Boxscore	Pts: Sifontes 15; Rebs: Carrera 7 Asts: three players 2	Arena: Coliseo Municipal Antonio Azurmendy Riveros; Attendance: 2,631; Referees: Ramiro Marques (BRA), Jayson Steill (CAN), Nicolás Flores (PAR)

25 November 2024	Argentina	88–68	Colombia	Mar del Plata
22:15	Scoring by quarter: 22–16, 24–9, 13–26, 29–17
	Pts: Garino, Vildoza 17; Rebs: Lugarini 8 Asts: Corbalán 8	Boxscore	Pts: Trocha 14; Rebs: Echenique 7 Asts: Atencia 6	Arena: Polideportivo Islas Malvinas; Referees: Omar Bermúdez (MEX), Alan dos Santos (BRA), Carmelo de la Rosa (PUR)

20 February 2025	Venezuela	67–64	Argentina	Caracas
19:10	Scoring by quarter: 16–16, 17–20, 17–13, 17–15
	Pts: Sifontes 16; Rebs: Ascanio 10; Asts: Vargas 6	Boxscore	Pts: Brussino 12; Rebs: Fernández 12; Asts: Campazzo 5	Arena: Parque Miranda; Attendance: 2,850; Referees: Omar Bermúdez (MEX), Krishna Domínguez (MEX), Nicolas Zivieri (BRA)

20 February 2025	Colombia	97–91	Chile	Cali
20:40	Scoring by quarter: 40–25, 23–23, 15–16, 19–27
	Pts: Roque 25; Rebs: Palacios 10; Asts: Atencia, Palacios 5	Boxscore	Pts: Herrera 25; Rebs: Haase, Herrera 6 Asts: Carrasco 6	Arena: Coliseo Evangelista Mora; Attendance: 2,250; Referees: Jorge Vázquez (PUR), Alan dos Santos (BRA), Carmelo de la Rosa (PUR)

23 February 2025	Colombia	82–98	Argentina	Cali
18:10	Scoring by quarter: 20–19, 19–34, 20–24, 23–21
	Pts: Echenique 16; Rebs: Echenique 9 Asts: Roque 4	Boxscore	Pts: Vildoza 18; Rebs: Bressan 6 Asts: Fernández 4	Arena: Coliseo Evangelista Mora; Attendance: 2,340; Referees: Roberto Vázquez (PUR), Kevin Lei (CAN), Edwin Quiles (PUR)

23 February 2025	Venezuela	73–72(OT)	Chile	Caracas
19:10	Scoring by quarter: 16–15, 19–14, 15–11, 13–23, Overtime: 10–9
	Pts: Sifontes 14; Rebs: Ascanio 8 Asts: Vargas 5	Boxscore	Pts: Haase 22; Rebs: five players 5 Asts: Haase 6	Arena: Parque Miranda; Attendance: 2,000; Referees: Andrés Bartel (URU), Fernando Leite (BRA), Nicolás Flores (PAR)

=== Group B ===
Pos	Team	Pld	W	L	PF	PA	PD	Pts	Qualification
1	Brazil	6	5	1	524	370	+154	11	2025 FIBA AmeriCup
2	Uruguay	6	4	2	495	403	+92	10	2025 FIBA AmeriCup
3	Panama	6	3	3	491	490	+1	9	2025 FIBA AmeriCup
4	Paraguay	6	0	6	372	619	−247	6	

Source: FIBA
Rules for classification: 1) points; 2) head-to-head points; 3) head-to-head points difference; 4) head-to-head number of points scored.

23 February 2024	Brazil	108–43	Paraguay	São Paulo
19:00	Scoring by quarter: 24–10, 21–8, 30–12, 33–13
	Pts: Dos Santos 22; Rebs: Caboclo 9 Asts: Corazza 6	Boxscore	Pts: A. López 9 Rebs: Rivero 5 Asts: Martínez 5	Arena: Ginásio Poliesportivo Wlamir Marques; Attendance: 6,031; Referees: Johnny Batista (PUR), Carlos Vélez (COL), Franco Ronconi (ARG)

23 February 2024	Uruguay	99–78	Panama	Montevideo
21:10	Scoring by quarter: 23–17, 37–24, 22–17, 17–20
	Pts: Fitipaldo, Granger 22; Rebs: Fitipaldo 6 Asts: Fitipaldo 8	Boxscore	Pts: Rodríguez 20; Rebs: Lindo 7 Asts: Rodríguez 3	Arena: Antel Arena; Attendance: 3,155; Referees: Daniel García (VEN), Carmelo de la Rosa (PUR), Franco Anselmo (ARG)

26 February 2024	Paraguay	53–108	Brazil	Asunción
19:00	Scoring by quarter: 12–25, 13–33, 14–23, 14–27
	Pts: Mercado 17; Rebs: Martínez 5 Asts: Martínez 5	Boxscore	Pts: Dias 20; Rebs: Cardoso 7 Asts: Corazza 10	Arena: SND Arena; Attendance: 1,250; Referees: Daniel García (VEN), Kristian Páez (ECU), Franco Anselmo (ARG)

26 February 2024	Panama	55–77	Uruguay	Panama City
20:10	Scoring by quarter: 12–12, 12–21, 10–29, 21–15
	Pts: Bishop, Gaskins 11; Rebs: Lindo, Romero 8 Asts: Gaskins 3	Boxscore	Pts: Rodríguez 18; Rebs: Ubal 6 Asts: Rodríguez 8	Arena: Roberto Durán Arena; Attendance: 3,050; Referees: Jorge Vázquez (PUR), Carlos Peralta (ECU), Kevin Lei (CAN)

21 November 2024	Paraguay	79–116	Panama	Pilar
19:40	Scoring by quarter: 23–30, 17–35, 25–25, 14–26
	Pts: Ochipinti 17; Rebs: Dose 4 Asts: Sánchez 4	Boxscore	Pts: Molinar 27; Rebs: Atencio 9 Asts: Molinar 5	Arena: Polideportivo Municipal Roberto Cabañas; Attendance: 2,320; Referees: Jorge Vázquez (PUR), Claudio Osorio (CHI), Franco Anselmo (ARG)

21 November 2024	Brazil	71–65	Uruguay	Belém
20:00
	Pts: Caboclo 21; Rebs: Caboclo 11; Asts: Corazza 7	Boxscore	Pts: Rodríguez 20; Rebs: Serres 5 Asts: Pomoli 5	Arena: Arena Guilherme Paraense; Attendance: 4,701; Referees: Roberto Vázquez (PUR), Krishna Domínguez (MEX), Carmelo de la Rosa (PUR)

24 November 2024	Paraguay	69–86	Uruguay	Pilar
19:40	Scoring by quarter: 21–29, 16–19, 23–19, 9–22
	Pts: Sarubbi 14; Rebs: Poisson 8 Asts: Riveros 3	Boxscore	Pts: Parodi 22; Rebs: Pomoli 13; Asts: Parodi 7	Arena: Polideportivo Municipal Roberto Cabañas; Attendance: 2,200; Referees: Daniel García (VEN), Edwin Quiles (PUR), Yezid Carreño (VEN)

24 November 2024	Brazil	93–67	Panama	Belém
20:00	Scoring by quarter: 26–16, 23–12, 24–19, 20–20
	Pts: Cardoso 18; Rebs: Cardoso 13; Asts: De Paula 6	Boxscore	Pts: Lindo 24; Rebs: Lindo, Romero 6 Asts: Molinar 5	Arena: Arena Guilherme Paraense; Attendance: 5,640; Referees: Johnny Batista (PUR), Orlando Varela (HON), Williset Del Valle (PUR)

21 February 2025	Uruguay	61–70	Brazil	Paysandú
20:10	Scoring by quarter: 13–21, 21–21, 14–10, 13–18
	Pts: Iglesias 14; Rebs: three players 5 Asts: Rodríguez 6	Boxscore	Pts: De Paula 20; Rebs: De Paula 11; Asts: De Paula, Dos Santos 2	Arena: Estadio 8 de Junio; Attendance: 1,617; Referees: Daniel García (VEN), Williset del Valle (PUR), Franco Anselmo (ARG)

21 February 2025	Panama	94–68	Paraguay	Panama City
20:40	Scoring by quarter: 22–27, 22–8, 14–15, 36–18
	Pts: Molinar 24; Rebs: Lindo 10; Asts: Molinar 7	Boxscore	Pts: Benítez 13; Rebs: Dose 8 Asts: Ruiz 5	Arena: Roberto Durán Arena; Attendance: 4,117; Referees: Johnny Batista (PUR), Roberto Fernández (CRC), Samuel Hidalgo (DOM)

24 February 2025	Uruguay	107–60	Paraguay	Paysandú
20:00	Scoring by quarter: 30–13, 25–27, 29–12, 23–9
	Pts: Pomoli 14; Rebs: Serres 9 Asts: Véscovi 8	Boxscore	Pts: Mercado 16; Rebs: Ruiz 6 Asts: Benítez 5	Arena: Estadio 8 de Junio; Referees: Juan Fernández (ARG), Carmelo de la Rosa (PUR), Claudio Osorio (CHI)

24 February 2025	Panama	81–74	Brazil	Panama City
20:40	Scoring by quarter: 19–22, 28–13, 18–18, 16–21
	Pts: Molinar 25; Rebs: Oglivie, Mitchell 8 Asts: Molinar 7	Boxscore	Pts: Fernandes 24; Rebs: three players 7 Asts: Borges 8	Arena: Roberto Durán Arena; Attendance: 6,157; Referees: Omar Bermúdez (MEX), Orlando Varela (HON), Julirys Guzmán (PUR)

=== Group C ===
Pos	Team	Pld	W	L	PF	PA	PD	Pts	Qualification
1	Canada	6	4	2	514	413	+101	10 (Note: Head-to-head points difference: Canada +14, Dominican Republic −1, Mexico −13.)	2025 FIBA AmeriCup
2	Dominican Republic	6	4	2	475	443	+32	10	2025 FIBA AmeriCup
3	Mexico	6	4	2	514	468	+46	10	
4	Nicaragua (Note: Nicaragua was confirmed as hosts of the 2025 FIBA AmeriCup on 22 December 2023, therefore qualifying for the tournament automatically, two teams will take the two remaining spots in Group C.)	6	0	6	371	550	−179	6	2025 FIBA AmeriCup as the hosts

Source: FIBA
Rules for classification: 1) points; 2) head-to-head points; 3) head-to-head points difference; 4) head-to-head number of points scored.
Notes:

23 February 2024	Canada	96–51	Nicaragua	St. Catharines
19:10	Scoring by quarter: 28–18, 23–17, 26–13, 19–3
	Pts: Best 21; Rebs: Young 9 Asts: P. Scrubb 8	Boxscore	Pts: Garth 14; Rebs: Cacho 6 Asts: Ruiz 6	Arena: Meridian Centre; Attendance: 3,166; Referees: Jesed Díaz (PUR), Yezid Carreño (VEN), Williset Del Valle (PUR)

23 February 2024	Dominican Republic	84–70	Mexico	Santo Domingo
20:10
	Pts: Montero 19; Rebs: Vargas 11; Asts: Montero 7	Boxscore	Pts: Girón 25; Rebs: Stoll 5 Asts: Stoll 6	Arena: Palacio de los Deportes; Attendance: 2,240; Referees: Jorge Vázquez (PUR), Juan Fernández (ARG), Alan dos Santos (BRA)

26 February 2024	Nicaragua	46–88	Canada	Managua
19:10	Scoring by quarter: 15–25, 11–17, 11–27, 9–19
	Pts: Ruiz 11; Rebs: Cacho, Ruiz 6 Asts: Ruiz 4	Boxscore	Pts: Rowe 19; Rebs: Rowe 10; Asts: Kajami-Keane 10	Arena: Polideportivo Alexis Argüello; Attendance: 6,323; Referees: Johnny Batista (PUR), Alan dos Santos (BRA), Orlando Varela (HON)

26 February 2024	Mexico	80–73(OT)	Dominican Republic	Mexico City
20:10	Scoring by quarter: 22–10, 18–15, 11–14, 15–27, Overtime: 14–7
	Pts: Stoll 16; Rebs: Bonilla 9 Asts: Stoll 4	Boxscore	Pts: Liz 16; Rebs: Vargas 9 Asts: Liz, Pérez 3	Arena: Arena CDMX; Attendance: 7,048; Referees: Roberto Vázquez (PUR), Julio Anaya (PAN), Franco Ronconi (ARG)

21 November 2024	Canada	88–71	Dominican Republic	Saskatoon
19:10	Scoring by quarter: 25–18, 24–19, 18–10, 21–24
	Pts: Kabengele 17; Rebs: Rowe 9 Asts: Bell-Haynes 10	Boxscore	Pts: Figueroa 18; Rebs: Liz 6 Asts: Bautista 7	Arena: SaskTel Centre; Attendance: 2,981; Referees: Julio Anaya (PAN), Andrés Bartel (URU), Alan dos Santos (BRA)

21 November 2024	Nicaragua	77–86	Mexico	Managua
19:10	Scoring by quarter: 16–29, 15–21, 25–14, 21–22
	Pts: Ruiz 25; Rebs: Campbell 8 Asts: Ruiz 5	Boxscore	Pts: Bonilla 20; Rebs: Gutiérrez, Jaimes 8 Asts: Bonilla, Jaimes 6	Arena: Polideportivo Alexis Argüello; Attendance: 7,301; Referees: Leonardo Zalazar (ARG), Daniel García (VEN), Orlando Varela (HON)

24 November 2024	Canada	83–73	Mexico	Saskatoon
14:10	Scoring by quarter: 24–14, 19–24, 23–25, 17–10
	Pts: Bell-Haynes 20; Rebs: Kabengele 12; Asts: Carr 10	Boxscore	Pts: Rodríguez 21; Rebs: Bonilla 8 Asts: Bonilla 11	Arena: SaskTel Centre; Attendance: 3,914; Referees: Luis Vázquez (PUR), Leonardo Zalazar (ARG), Carlos Vélez (COL)

24 November 2024	Nicaragua	73–89	Dominican Republic	Managua
19:10	Scoring by quarter: 21–14, 14–32, 21–26, 17–17
	Pts: Martínez 21; Rebs: three players 8 Asts: Ruiz 5	Boxscore	Pts: Liz 19; Rebs: Vargas 10; Asts: Bautista 5	Arena: Polideportivo Alexis Argüello; Attendance: 8,438; Referees: Jorge Vázquez (PUR), Roberto Fernández (CRC), Norval Young (IVB)

21 February 2025	Dominican Republic	74–65	Canada	Santo Domingo
20:10	Scoring by quarter: 19–17, 18–15, 19–13, 18–20
	Pts: Feliz 18; Rebs: Delgado, Feliz 6 Asts: Jones, Montero 4	Boxscore	Pts: Bell-Haynes, Kabengele 12; Rebs: Kabengele 12; Asts: Bell-Haynes 6	Arena: Pabellón Ricardo Gioriver Arias; Attendance: 2,000; Referees: Roberto Vázquez (PUR), Juan Fernández (ARG), Orlando Varela (HON)

21 February 2025	Mexico	107–57	Nicaragua	San Luis Potosí
20:40	Scoring by quarter: 31–13, 33–22, 24–3, 19–19
	Pts: Bonilla, Rodríguez 17; Rebs: Jaimes 12; Asts: Stoll 7	Boxscore	Pts: Ruiz 21; Rebs: Martínez 8 Asts: Garth, Ruiz 3	Arena: Arena Potosí; Attendance: 2,485; Referees: Grant Todey (USA), Diego Chiconato (BRA), Julirys Guzmán (PUR)

24 February 2025	Mexico	98–94	Canada	San Luis Potosí
19:00	Scoring by quarter: 26–29, 28–22, 15–20, 29–23
	Pts: Cruz 30; Rebs: Bonilla 8 Asts: Avila, Cruz 4	Boxscore	Pts: Kabengele 24; Rebs: Mike 10; Asts: Carr 8	Arena: Arena Potosí; Attendance: 7,924; Referees: Johnny Batista (PUR), Daniel García (VEN), Alan dos Santos (BRA)

24 February 2025	Dominican Republic	84–67	Nicaragua	Santo Domingo
21:00	Scoring by quarter: 29–17, 20–12, 22–18, 13–20
	Pts: Montero 16; Rebs: Soriano 12; Asts: Figueroa 7	Boxscore	Pts: Ruiz 25; Rebs: Ruiz 8 Asts: Ruiz 6	Arena: Pabellón Ricardo Gioriver Arias; Attendance: 3,000; Referees: Grant Todey (USA), Williset del Valle (PUR), Nicolas Zivieri (BRA)

=== Group D ===
Pos	Team	Pld	W	L	PF	PA	PD	Pts	Qualification
1	United States	6	5	1	549	454	+95	11	2025 FIBA AmeriCup
2	Bahamas	6	2	4	471	515	−44	8	2025 FIBA AmeriCup
3	Puerto Rico	5	2	3	381	408	−27	7 (Note: Cuba 73–81 Puerto Rico)	2025 FIBA AmeriCup
4	Cuba	5	2	3	383	407	−24	7	

Source: FIBA
Rules for classification: 1) points; 2) head-to-head points; 3) head-to-head points difference; 4) head-to-head number of points scored.
Notes:

22 February 2024	United States	100–79	Cuba	Kissimmee
19:10	Scoring by quarter: 32–16, 23–22, 18–25, 27–16
	Pts: Ramsey 20; Rebs: Payton 11; Asts: Payton 8	Boxscore	Pts: García 19; Rebs: Cubilla 9 Asts: Rivero 5	Arena: Silver Spurs Arena; Attendance: 457; Referees: Krishna Domínguez (MEX), Michael Scott (CAN), Samuel Hidalgo (DOM)

22 February 2024	Puerto Rico	77–88	Bahamas	San Juan
20:10	Scoring by quarter: 15–30, 18–17, 24–24, 20–17
	Pts: Fernández 17; Rebs: Romero 7 Asts: Fernández 6	Boxscore	Pts: Bridgewater 20; Rebs: Miller 9 Asts: Bridgewater 6	Arena: Roberto Clemente Coliseum; Attendance: 7,800; Referees: Julio Anaya (PAN), Leonardo Zalazar (ARG), Waseem Husainy (CAN)

25 February 2024	Cuba	81–67	United States	Havana
17:10	Scoring by quarter: 26–10, 15–22, 31–20, 9–15
	Pts: Bombino 19; Rebs: Rivero 9 Asts: Espinosa 6	Boxscore	Pts: Gray 17; Rebs: Johnson 10; Asts: three players 2	Arena: Coliseo de la Ciudad Deportiva; Attendance: 7,532; Referees: Leonardo Zalazar (ARG), Roberto Fernández (CRC), Jayson Steill (CAN)

25 February 2024	Bahamas	67–86	Puerto Rico	Nassau
20:10	Scoring by quarter: 16–26, 12–18, 14–22, 25–20
	Pts: Jones 14; Rebs: Jones 9 Asts: Gordon 3	Boxscore	Pts: Romero 22; Rebs: Toro 17; Asts: Plummer 5	Arena: Kendall Isaacs Gymnasium; Attendance: 2,000; Referees: Carlos Peralta (ECU), Michael Scott (CAN), Samuel Hidalgo (DOM)

22 November 2024	Cuba	76–62	Bahamas	Havana
18:00	Scoring by quarter: 16–11, 18–15, 22–17, 20–19
	Pts: Mensia 17; Rebs: Mensia 8 Asts: García 3	Boxscore	Pts: Davis, Miller 17; Rebs: Miller 8 Asts: Munnings 4	Arena: Coliseo de la Ciudad Deportiva; Attendance: 2,853; Referees: Juan Fernández (ARG), Jayson Steill (CAN), Ramiro Marques (BRA)

22 November 2024	United States	108–66	Puerto Rico	Washington, D.C.
19:10	Scoring by quarter: 22–18, 24–17, 32–14, 30–17
	Pts: Smart 20; Rebs: Covington 9 Asts: Stockton 10	Boxscore	Pts: Wheeler 12; Rebs: Toro 6 Asts: three players 2	Arena: Entertainment and Sports Arena; Attendance: 753; Referees: Omar Bermúdez (MEX), Carlos Peralta (ECU), Kristian Páez (ECU)

25 November 2024	Cuba	73–81	Puerto Rico	Havana
18:00	Scoring by quarter: 15–14, 27–21, 16–23, 15–23
	Pts: Bombino 20; Rebs: Sant-Roos 7 Asts: García, Sant-Roos 5	Boxscore	Pts: Romero 15; Rebs: Romero 14; Asts: Fernández 5	Arena: Coliseo de la Ciudad Deportiva; Attendance: 4,815; Referees: Andrés Bartel (URU), Krishna Dominguez (MEX), Kevin Lei (CAN)

25 November 2024	United States	97–74	Bahamas	Washington, D.C.
19:10
	Pts: Smart 21; Rebs: Kaminsky 7 Asts: Stockton 6	Boxscore	Pts: Miller 20; Rebs: Miller 10; Asts: Davis 5	Arena: Entertainment and Sports Arena; Attendance: 489; Referees: Julio Anaya (PAN), Fernando Leite (BRA), Samuel Hidalgo (DOM)

20 February 2025	Puerto Rico	71–72	United States	San Juan
20:10	Scoring by quarter: 14–23, 26–20, 19–13, 12–16
	Pts: Howard 17; Rebs: Conditt 10; Asts: Conditt, Fernández 3	Boxscore	Pts: Smart 16; Rebs: Baker, Williams 7 Asts: Nembhard 3	Arena: Roberto Clemente Coliseum; Attendance: 7,555; Referees: Andrés Bartel (URU), Fernando Leite (BRA), Nathaniel Saunders (CAN)

20 February 2025	Bahamas	97–74	Cuba	Nassau
20:40	Scoring by quarter: 26–20, 25–14, 21–20, 25–20
	Pts: Miller 26; Rebs: Davis, Miller 8 Asts: Clarke 7	Boxscore	Pts: Rivero 15; Rebs: Bombino, Chacón 8 Asts: Chacón 4	Arena: Kendall Isaacs Gymnasium; Attendance: 200; Referees: Michael Scott (CAN), Claudio Osorio (CHI), Yezid Carreño (VEN)

23 February 2025	Bahamas	83–105	United States	Nassau
19:10	Scoring by quarter: 22–26, 14–22, 20–25, 27–32
	Pts: Bridgewater 19; Rebs: Bastian 9 Asts: Bridgewater 5	Boxscore	Pts: Little, Smart 16; Rebs: Baker 9 Asts: Cole, Smart 3	Arena: Kendall Isaacs Gymnasium; Attendance: 200; Referees: Carlos Vélez (COL), Ramiro Marques (BRA), Nathaniel Saunders (CAN)

Cancelled (Note: The game, scheduled for 23 February 2025, 20:10 local time, was cancelled due to visa issues preventing Cuba from reaching San Juan. In accordance with FIBA regulations, no points were awarded to either team.)	Puerto Rico	vs.	Cuba	San Juan
		Boxscore		Arena: Roberto Clemente Coliseum

== Qualified teams ==
Team	Qualification method	Date of qualification	Appearance(s)				Previous best performance (Note: Bold text indicates they hosted that edition.)	WR (Note: World ranking at start of tournament.)
Team	Qualification method	Date of qualification	Total	First	Last	Streak	Previous best performance	WR
Nicaragua	Host nation	22 December 2023	1st	—	—	1	Debut	80
Uruguay	Group B top three	24 November 2024	19th	1980	2022	16	Runners-up (1984)	51
Brazil	Group B top three	24 November 2024	20th	1980	2022	20	Champions (1984, 1988, 2005, 2009)	12
United States	Group D top three	20 February 2025	12th	1989	2022	3	Champions (Seven times) (Note: The United States has won in 1992, 1993, 1997, 1999, 2003, 2007, and 2017.)	1
Argentina	Group A top three	20 February 2025	20th	1980	2022	20	Champions (2001, 2011, 2022)	8
Colombia	Group A top three	20 February 2025	3rd	2017	2022	3	Ninth place (2022)	55
Panama	Group B top three	21 February 2025	14th	1984	2022	4	Fourth place (1984)	57
Venezuela	Group A top three	23 February 2025	18th	1988	2022	18	Champions (2015)	25
Bahamas	Group D top three	23 February 2025	2nd	1995		1	Eighth place (1995)	52
Puerto Rico	Group D top three	23 February 2025	20th	1980	2022	20	Champions (1980, 1989, 1995)	15
Canada	Group C top two	24 February 2025	20th	1980	2022	20	Runners-up (1980, 1999)	6
Dominican Republic	Group C top two	24 February 2025	15th	1984	2022	7	Third place (2011)	18
