= 2025 FIBA AmeriCup =

International basketball tournament

Tournament details
- Host country: Nicaragua
- City: Managua
- Dates: 22–31 August
- Teams: 12
- Venue: 1 (in 1 host city)

Final positions
- Champions: Brazil (5th title)
- Runners-up: Argentina
- Third place: United States
- Fourth place: Canada

Tournament statistics
- Games played: 26
- Attendance: 65,270 (2,510 per game)
- MVP: (Brazil) Yago dos Santos
- Top scorer: (The Bahamas) Franco Miller Jr. (22.7 ppg)

Official website
- 2025 FIBA AmeriCup

The 2025 FIBA AmeriCup was the 20th edition of the FIBA AmeriCup, the quadrennial international men's basketball championship organized by FIBA Americas. The tournament was played in Managua, Nicaragua for the first time, from 22 to 31 August 2025. This also marked the first time the competition was in Central America. The competition returned to its usual four-year cycle, after the previous tournament was delayed to 2022 due to the COVID-19 pandemic.

The 2025 FIBA AmeriCup concluded with Brazil winning their fifth title in the competition, defeating Argentina in the final, a rematch from 2022. The United States won the bronze medal for the second consecutive AmeriCup, with their victory against Canada.

== Qualification ==
Map of qualifiers for the 2025 AmeriCup: Team qualified for 2025 AmeriCup Team failed to qualify Did not enter

25 teams took part in qualification, including hosts Nicaragua, who participated for preparation reasons. The teams who failed to qualify for the previous edition played in the pre-qualifiers. The advancing teams progressed to the qualifiers where each team was drawn into four groups of four. The top three from each group qualified for the AmeriCup. The qualifiers draw was held on 9 August 2023 in Miami. Games were played from February 2024 to February 2025, to determine the 12 nations who will qualify for the tournament.

Of the twelve qualified teams, 10 were present in the previous edition. Hosts Nicaragua will make their debut in this edition while The Bahamas returned to the competition after 30 years, their only prior appearance being in 1995.

Mexico, winners of the competition in 2013, failed to qualify. The U.S. Virgin Islands also missed the tournament after being eliminated in the pre-qualifiers.

Argentina, Brazil, Canada, and Puerto Rico all continued their perfect record of participating in every tournament.

=== Qualified teams ===
Team	Qualification method	Date of qualification	Appearance(s)				Previous best performance (Note: Bold text indicates they hosted that edition.)	WR (Note: World ranking at start of tournament.)
Team	Qualification method	Date of qualification	Total	First	Last	Streak	Previous best performance	WR
Nicaragua	Host nation	22 December 2023	1st	—	—	1	Debut	80
Uruguay	Group B top three	24 November 2024	19th	1980	2022	16	Runners-up (1984)	51
Brazil	Group B top three	24 November 2024	20th	1980	2022	20	Champions (1984, 1988, 2005, 2009)	12
United States	Group D top three	20 February 2025	12th	1989	2022	3	Champions (Seven times) (Note: The United States has won in 1992, 1993, 1997, 1999, 2003, 2007, and 2017.)	1
Argentina	Group A top three	20 February 2025	20th	1980	2022	20	Champions (2001, 2011, 2022)	8
Colombia	Group A top three	20 February 2025	3rd	2017	2022	3	Ninth place (2022)	55
Panama	Group B top three	21 February 2025	14th	2015	2022	4	Fourth place (1984)	57
Venezuela	Group A top three	23 February 2025	18th	1988	2022	18	Champions (2015)	25
Bahamas	Group D top three	23 February 2025	2nd	1995		1	Eighth place (1995)	52
Puerto Rico	Group D top three	23 February 2025	20th	1980	2022	20	Champions (1980, 1989, 1995)	15
Canada	Group C top two	24 February 2025	20th	1980	2022	20	Runners-up (1980, 1999)	6
Dominican Republic	Group C top two	24 February 2025	15th	1984	2022	7	Third place (2011)	18

== Venue ==
All games were played at the Polideportivo Alexis Argüello.

== Draw ==
The draw took place on 26 March 2025 in Miami, United States.

=== Seeding ===
The seeding was revealed on 7 March 2025.

Pot 1
Team	Pos
United States	1
Canada	6
Nicaragua	79

Pot 2
Team	Pos
Argentina	8
Brazil	12
Puerto Rico	15

Pot 3
Team	Pos
Dominican Republic	18
Venezuela	25
Uruguay	51

Pot 4
Team	Pos
Bahamas	52
Colombia	55
Panama	57

== Preliminary round ==
All times are local (Central Standard Time; UTC−6).

=== Group A ===
Pos	Team	Pld	W	L	PF	PA	PD	Pts	Qualification
1	United States	3	2	1	280	257	+23	5	Quarterfinals
2	Uruguay	3	2	1	262	257	+5	5	Quarterfinals
3	Brazil	3	2	1	243	232	+11	5	Quarterfinals
4	Bahamas	3	0	3	250	289	−39	3	

Source: FIBA
Rules for classification: 1) Points; 2) Head-to-head results; 3) Points difference; 4) Points scored.

23 August 2025
13:10

Boxscore

Brazil	81–76	Uruguay
Scoring by quarter: 27–20, 19–24, 19–18, 16–14
Pts: Caboclo 13; Rebs: Caboclo 10; Asts: dos Santos 5		Pts: Serres 14; Rebs: Serres, Véscovi 6 Asts: Fitipaldo 8

Polideportivo Alexis Argüello, Managua
Attendance: 1,000
Referees: Omar Bermúdez (MEX), Daniel García (VEN), Waseem Husainy (CAN)

23 August 2025
15:40

Boxscore

United States	105–93 (OT)	Bahamas
Scoring by quarter: 25–26, 16–20, 23–19, 20–19, Overtime: 21–9
Pts: Auguste 28; Rebs: Cavanaugh 14; Asts: Grant 7		Pts: Miller Jr. 29; Rebs: Mobley 10; Asts: Clarke 7

Polideportivo Alexis Argüello, Managua
Attendance: 1,000
Referees: Julio Anaya (PAN), Michael Scott (CAN), Claudio Osorio (CHI)

24 August 2025
15:40

Boxscore

Bahamas	66–84	Brazil
Scoring by quarter: 23–18, 16–22, 11–33, 16–11
Pts: Miller Jr. 19; Rebs: Davis 7 Asts: Miller 5		Pts: dos Santos 17; Rebs: Santos 6 Asts: Borges 8

Polideportivo Alexis Argüello, Managua
Attendance: 550
Referees: Krishna Domínguez (DOM), Daniel García (VEN), Orlando Varela (HON)

24 August 2025
21:10

Boxscore

Uruguay	86–85	United States
Scoring by quarter: 19–15, 20–27, 25–18, 22–25
Pts: Véscovi 24; Rebs: Rodríguez 8 Asts: Fitipaldo 6		Pts: Galloway 25; Rebs: three players 7 Asts: Grant 7

Polideportivo Alexis Argüello, Managua
Attendance: 1,000
Referees: Julio Anaya (PAN), Carlos Vélez (COL), Waseem Husainy (CAN)

26 August 2025
16:10

Boxscore

Uruguay	100–91	Bahamas
Scoring by quarter: 22–16, 24–30, 20–26, 34–19
Pts: Fitipaldo 33; Rebs: Fitipaldo 8 Asts: Fitipaldo 13		Pts: Bridgewater 29; Rebs: Burrows 7 Asts: Bridgewater, Hunter 5

Polideportivo Alexis Argüello, Managua
Attendance: 300
Referees: Julio Anaya (PAN), Juan Fernández (ARG), Michael Scott (CAN)

26 August 2025
19:10

Boxscore

United States	90–78	Brazil
Scoring by quarter: 24–21, 16–25, 24–21, 26–11
Pts: Smart 22; Rebs: Cavanaugh, Smart 7 Asts: Galloway 5		Pts: Caboclo 21; Rebs: Santos 8 Asts: dos Santos 9

Polideportivo Alexis Argüello, Managua
Attendance: 2,500
Referees: Daniel García (VEN), Carlos Vélez (COL), Orlando Varela (HON)

=== Group B ===
Pos	Team	Pld	W	L	PF	PA	PD	Pts	Qualification
1	Canada	3	3	0	269	176	+93	6	Quarterfinals
2	Puerto Rico	3	2	1	263	211	+52	5	Quarterfinals
3	Venezuela	3	1	2	201	258	−57	4	
4	Panama	3	0	3	181	269	−88	3	

Source: FIBA
Rules for classification: 1) Points; 2) Head-to-head results; 3) Points difference; 4) Points scored.

22 August 2025
13:10

Boxscore

Panama	59–93	Puerto Rico
Scoring by quarter: 17–24, 13–16, 12–25, 17–28
Pts: Rodríguez Jr. 15; Rebs: Atencio, Bell 6 Asts: Bell 3		Pts: Romero 15; Rebs: Conditt IV, Romero 9 Asts: Alvarado 6

Polideportivo Alexis Argüello, Managua
Attendance: 500
Referees: Krishna Domínguez (DOM), Carlos Vélez (COL), Alan dos Santos (BRA)

22 August 2025
15:40

Boxscore

Venezuela	54–88	Canada
Scoring by quarter: 13–26, 13–15, 18–25, 10–22
Pts: Sifontes 14; Rebs: Sifontes 5 Asts: Mijares, Sifontes 4		Pts: George 18; Rebs: Muenkat 9 Asts: Bell-Haynes 9

Polideportivo Alexis Argüello, Managua
Attendance: 500
Referees: Omar Bermúdez (MEX), Andrés Bartel (URU), Orlando Varela (HON)

23 August 2025
18:40

Boxscore

Puerto Rico	97–70	Venezuela
Scoring by quarter: 21–17, 22–26, 27–15, 27–12
Pts: Romero 19; Rebs: Conditt IV 13; Asts: Browne 9		Pts: Mijares 25; Rebs: Graterol 6 Asts: Sifontes 6

Polideportivo Alexis Argüello, Managua
Attendance: 520
Referees: Andrés Bartel (URU), Juan Fernández (ARG), Fernando Leite (BRA)

23 August 2025
21:10

Boxscore

Canada	99–49	Panama
Scoring by quarter: 33–16, 21–15, 24–4, 21–14
Pts: Darling 22; Rebs: Wiltjer 9 Asts: Carr 6		Pts: Rodríguez Jr. 10; Rebs: Gedeon 5 Asts: three players 2

Polideportivo Alexis Argüello, Managua
Attendance: 500
Referees: Carlos Vélez (COL), Orlando Varela (HON), Alan dos Santos (BRA)

25 August 2025
13:10

Boxscore

Panama	73–77	Venezuela
Scoring by quarter: 17–23, 22–11, 16–19, 18–24
Pts: Bell 20; Rebs: Bell 13; Asts: Armstrong 12		Pts: Cubillán 15; Rebs: Guerra 9 Asts: Sifontes 7

Polideportivo Alexis Argüello, Managua
Attendance: 500
Referees: Juan Fernández (ARG), Carlos Vélez (COL), Fernando Leite (BRA)

25 August 2025
21:10

Boxscore

Canada	82–73	Puerto Rico
Scoring by quarter: 20–18, 16–16, 22–23, 24–16
Pts: George 17; Rebs: Kabengele 10; Asts: Wiltjer 5		Pts: Alvarado 20; Rebs: Conditt IV 8 Asts: Clavell 7

Polideportivo Alexis Argüello, Managua
Attendance: 5,000
Referees: Andrés Bartel (URU), Krishna Domínguez (MEX), Orlando Varela (HON)

=== Group C ===
Pos	Team	Pld	W	L	PF	PA	PD	Pts	Qualification
1	Dominican Republic	3	3	0	242	212	+30	6	Quarterfinals
2	Argentina	3	2	1	261	237	+24	5	Quarterfinals
3	Colombia	3	1	2	231	254	−23	4	Quarterfinals
4	Nicaragua (H)	3	0	3	226	257	−31	3	

Source: FIBA
Rules for classification: 1) Points; 2) Head-to-head results; 3) Points difference; 4) Points scored.
(H) Hosts

22 August 2025
18:40

Boxscore

Nicaragua	70–94	Argentina
Scoring by quarter: 18–20, 14–28, 14–21, 24–25
Pts: Ruiz 19; Rebs: Omier 17; Asts: Omier 7		Pts: Brussino 17; Rebs: Vaulet 6 Asts: Marcos, Vildoza 4

Polideportivo Alexis Argüello, Managua
Attendance: 7,500
Referees: Johnny Batista (PUR), Blanca Burns (USA), Michael Scott (CAN)

22 August 2025
21:10

Boxscore

Dominican Republic	84–59	Colombia
Scoring by quarter: 22–18, 22–15, 22–15, 18–11
Pts: Jones 22; Rebs: Jones 8 Asts: Feliz 9		Pts: Angola 19; Rebs: Angola 9 Asts: three players 3

Polideportivo Alexis Argüello, Managua
Attendance: 2,500
Referees: Julio Anaya (PAN), Matthew Myers (USA), Fernando Leite (BRA)

24 August 2025
13:10

Boxscore

Argentina	83–84 (OT)	Dominican Republic
Scoring by quarter: 19–13, 17–20, 19–18, 20–24, Overtime: 8–9
Pts: Corbalán 20; Rebs: Brussino, Vaulet 7 Asts: Vildoza 10		Pts: Jones 20; Rebs: Jones 9 Asts: Feliz 11

Polideportivo Alexis Argüello, Managua
Attendance: 450
Referees: Roberto Vázquez (PUR), Matthew Myers (USA), Alan dos Santos (BRA)

24 August 2025
18:40

Boxscore

Colombia	89–86	Nicaragua
Scoring by quarter: 13–27, 28–21, 20–23, 28–15
Pts: Atencia 26; Rebs: Solís 9 Asts: Roque 6		Pts: Omier 30; Rebs: Omier 20; Asts: Ruiz 11

Polideportivo Alexis Argüello, Managua
Attendance: 7,900
Referees: Johnny Batista (PUR), Blanca Burns (USA), Carmelo de la Rosa (PUR)

25 August 2025
15:40

Boxscore

Argentina	84–83	Colombia
Scoring by quarter: 29–17, 11–24, 22–17, 22–25
Pts: Fernández 36; Rebs: Fernández 16; Asts: Vildoza 5		Pts: Angola 22; Rebs: Solís 13; Asts: Angola 10

Polideportivo Alexis Argüello, Managua
Attendance: 500
Referees: Omar Bermúdez (MEX), Johnny Batista (PUR), Daniel García (VEN)

25 August 2025
18:40

Boxscore

Dominican Republic	74–70	Nicaragua
Scoring by quarter: 16–16, 21–16, 22–20, 15–18
Pts: Núñez 17; Rebs: Núñez 8 Asts: Montero 8		Pts: Omier 21; Rebs: Omier 18; Asts: Omier 7

Polideportivo Alexis Argüello, Managua
Attendance: 8,500
Referees: Roberto Vázquez (PUR), Blanca Burns (USA), Waseem Husainy (CAN)

=== Ranking of third-placed teams ===
Pos	Grp	Team	Pld	W	L	PF	PA	PD	Pts	Qualification
1	A	Brazil	3	2	1	243	232	+11	5	Quarterfinals
2	C	Colombia	3	1	2	231	254	−23	4	Quarterfinals
3	B	Venezuela	3	1	2	201	258	−57	4	

Source: FIBA
Rules for classification: 1) Points; 2) Head-to-head; 3) Points difference; 4) Points scored.

== Knockout stage ==
The teams will be ranked 1 to 8 based on their preliminary round results.

=== Preliminary round results ===
Pos	Grp	Team	Pld	W	L	PF	PA	PD	Pts
1	B	Canada	3	3	0	269	176	+93	6
2	C	Dominican Republic	3	3	0	242	212	+30	6
3	A	United States	3	2	1	280	257	+23	5
4	B	Puerto Rico	3	2	1	263	211	+52	5
5	C	Argentina	3	2	1	261	237	+24	5
6	A	Uruguay	3	2	1	262	257	+5	5
7	A	Brazil	3	2	1	243	232	+11	5
8	C	Colombia	3	1	2	231	254	−23	4

Source: FIBA
Rules for classification: 1) Points; 2) Head-to-head results; 3) Points difference; 4) Points scored.

=== Bracket ===
Quarter-finals
28 August
Canada	94
Colombia	56
28 August
Puerto Rico	77
Argentina (OT)	82
28 August
Dominican Republic	82
Brazil	94
28 August
United States	83
Uruguay	70

Semi-finals
30 August
Canada	73
Argentina	83
30 August
Brazil	92
United States	77

Final
31 August
Argentina	47
Brazil	55
Third place game
31 August
Canada	85
United States	90

=== Quarter-finals ===
28 August 2025
13:10

Boxscore

Dominican Republic	82–94	Brazil
Scoring by quarter: 25–18, 17–29, 19–28, 21–18
Pts: Feliz 14; Rebs: Núñez 6 Asts: Feliz 7		Pts: De Paula 28; Rebs: Caboclo 9 Asts: De Paula 7

Polideportivo Alexis Argüello, Managua
Attendance: 600
Referees: Juan Fernández (ARG), Orlando Varela (HON), Michael Scott (CAN)

28 August 2025
15:40

Boxscore

United States	83–70	Uruguay
Scoring by quarter: 18–15, 20–30, 25–15, 20–10
Pts: Smart 27; Rebs: Cooley 12; Asts: Galloway 4		Pts: Véscovi 17; Rebs: Bianchi 8 Asts: Parodi 6

Polideportivo Alexis Argüello, Managua
Attendance: 750
Referees: Julio Anaya (PAN), Carlos Vélez (COL), Waseem Husainy (CAN)

28 August 2025
18:40

Boxscore

Puerto Rico	77–82 (OT)	Argentina
Scoring by quarter: 11–18, 24–18, 24–15, 11–19, Overtime: 7–12
Pts: Alvarado 25; Rebs: Romero 11; Asts: Plummer 6		Pts: Fernández, Vildoza 18; Rebs: Brussino 12; Asts: Corbalán 6

Polideportivo Alexis Argüello, Managua
Attendance: 1,500
Referees: Omar Bermúdez (MEX), Daniel García (VEN), Alan dos Santos (BRA)

28 August 2025
21:10

Boxscore

Canada	94–56	Colombia
Scoring by quarter: 28–15, 26–10, 23–20, 17–11
Pts: George 18; Rebs: Miller 9 Asts: Bell-Haynes 6		Pts: Atencia 19; Rebs: Angola 5 Asts: Angola 3

Polideportivo Alexis Argüello, Managua
Attendance: 1,500
Referees: Andrés Bartel (URU), Krishna Domínguez (MEX), Fernando Leite (BRA)

=== Semi-finals ===
30 August 2025
14:40

Boxscore

Brazil	92–77	United States
Scoring by quarter: 20–23, 18–29, 20–16, 34–9
Pts: dos Santos 25; Rebs: Dias 13; Asts: dos Santos 12		Pts: Galloway 22; Rebs: Baker, Cooley 6 Asts: Smart 5

Polideportivo Alexis Argüello, Managua
Attendance: 2,500
Referees: Andrés Bartel (URU), Daniel García (VEN), Krishna Domínguez (MEX)

30 August 2025
18:10

Boxscore

Canada	73–83	Argentina
Scoring by quarter: 9–24, 20–22, 16–22, 28–15
Pts: Carr 16; Rebs: Kabengele 8 Asts: Carr 4		Pts: Vildoza 26; Rebs: Corbalán 11; Asts: Corbalán, Vildoza 6

Polideportivo Alexis Argüello, Managua
Attendance: 8,000
Referees: Julio Anaya (PAN), Carlos Vélez (COL), Orlando Varela (HON)

=== Third place game ===
31 August 2025
14:40

Boxscore

Canada	85–90	United States
Scoring by quarter: 18–23, 19–26, 24–19, 24–22
Pts: Carr, Kabengele 16; Rebs: Miller 9 Asts: Carr 7		Pts: Cavanaugh, Smart 21; Rebs: Cooley 8 Asts: Grant 7

Polideportivo Alexis Argüello, Managua
Attendance: 700
Referees: Julio Anaya (PAN), Daniel García (VEN), Alan dos Santos (BRA)

=== Final ===
31 August 2025
18:10

Boxscore

Argentina	47–55	Brazil
Scoring by quarter: 15–16, 9–15, 12–11, 11–13
Pts: Cáffaro 11; Rebs: Corbalán 9 Asts: Vildoza 4		Pts: dos Santos 14; Rebs: Dias 8 Asts: Dias, dos Santos 5

Polideportivo Alexis Argüello, Managua
Attendance: 8,500
Referees: Roberto Vázquez (PUR), Omar Bermúdez (MEX), Andrés Bartel (URU)

== Final standings ==
Rank	Team	Record
1st place, gold medalist(s)	Brazil	5–1
2nd place, silver medalist(s)	Argentina	4–2
3rd place, bronze medalist(s)	United States	4–2
4	Canada	4–2
5	Dominican Republic	3–1
6	Puerto Rico	2–2
7	Uruguay	2–2
8	Colombia	1–3
9	Venezuela	1–2
10	Nicaragua	0–3
11	Bahamas	0–3
12	Panama	0–3

== Awards ==
The following awards were presented at the conclusion of the championship.

AmeriCup MVP
(Brazil) Yago dos Santos
FIBA AmeriCup All-Tournament Team
(Brazil) Yago dos Santos	(United States) Javonte Smart	(Canada) Kyshawn George	(Brazil) Bruno Caboclo	(Argentina) Juan Fernández
FIBA Americup All-Tournament Second Team
(Puerto Rico) José Alvarado	(Argentina) José Vildoza	(Brazil) Georginho de Paula	(Nicaragua) Norchad Omier	(Canada) Mfiondu Kabengele
