= FIBA AmeriCup =

Men's basketball tournament

- Most recent season or competition: 2025 FIBA AmeriCup
- Formerly: Tournament of the Americas; FIBA Americas Championship
- Sport: Basketball
- Founded: 1980; 46 years ago
- First season: 1980
- Organizing body: FIBA Americas
- No. of teams: 12
- Country: FIBA Americas member nations
- Continent: Americas
- Most recent champion: Brazil (5th title)
- Most titles: United States (7 titles)
- Related competitions: Centrobasket; South American Championship
- Website: FIBA Americas

The FIBA AmeriCup (previously known as the FIBA Americas Championship or Torneo de las Américas) is the Americas men's basketball championship that takes place once every four years between national teams of the Western Hemisphere continents.

Since FIBA organized the entire Western Hemisphere west of the Atlantic Ocean under one zone, countries from North America, Central America, the Caribbean and South America compete in this tournament.

Through the 2015 edition, the Americas championship took place every two years, and was also a qualifying tournament for the FIBA World Cup and the Summer Olympic Games. Since 2017, however, the AmeriCup, along with all other FIBA continental championships for men are played once every four years. The continental championships are no longer a part of the qualifying process for either the World Cup or Olympics.

The United States has the most titles in the tournament's history with seven, but did not contest all editions of the tournament while they were qualified and focused for the Olympic Games and World Cup.

== Summaries ==
Ed.	Year	Host	Gold medal game			Bronze medal game		
Ed.	Year	Host	Gold	Score	Silver	Bronze	Score	Fourth place
1	1980	Puerto Rico	Puerto Rico	– (Note: Positions defined after a round-robin tournament.)	Canada	Argentina	–	Brazil
2	1984	Brazil	Brazil	–	Uruguay	Canada	–	Panama
3	1988	Uruguay	Brazil	101–92	Puerto Rico	Canada	87–70	Uruguay
4	1989	Mexico	Puerto Rico	89–80	United States	Brazil	158–124	Venezuela
5	1992	United States	United States	127–80	Venezuela	Brazil	93–91	Puerto Rico
6	1993	Puerto Rico	United States	109–95	Puerto Rico	Argentina	98–91	Brazil
7	1995	Argentina	Puerto Rico	87–86	Argentina	Brazil	97–77	Canada
8	1997	Uruguay	United States	95–86	Puerto Rico	Brazil	76–75	Argentina
9	1999	Puerto Rico	United States	92–66	Canada	Argentina	103–101	Puerto Rico
10	2001	Argentina	Argentina	78–59	Brazil	Canada	102–95	Puerto Rico
11	2003	Puerto Rico	United States	106–73	Argentina	Puerto Rico	79–66	Canada
12	2005	Dominican Republic	Brazil	100–88	Argentina	Venezuela	93–83	United States
13	2007	United States	United States	118–81	Argentina	Puerto Rico	111–107	Brazil
14	2009	Puerto Rico	Brazil	61–60	Puerto Rico	Argentina	88–73	Canada
15	2011	Argentina	Argentina	80–75	Brazil	Dominican Republic	103–89	Puerto Rico
16	2013	Venezuela	Mexico	91–89	Puerto Rico	Argentina	103–93	Dominican Republic
17	2015	Mexico	Venezuela	76–71	Argentina	Canada	87–86	Mexico
18	2017	Argentina; Colombia; Uruguay	United States	81–76	Argentina	Mexico	79–65	Virgin Islands
19	2022	Brazil	Argentina	75–73	Brazil	United States	84–80	Canada
20	2025	Nicaragua	Brazil	55–47	Argentina	United States	90–85	Canada
21	2029	TBD		–			–	

== Medal table ==
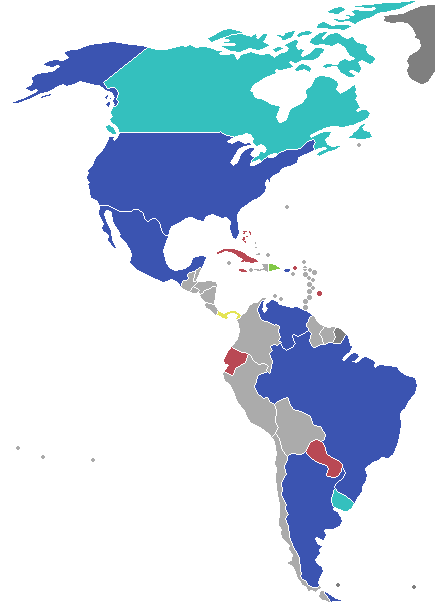
Map of best finishes per team. First place Second place Fourth place and better Eighth place and better Worse than eighth place FIBA Americas member, no appearance yet Not a FIBA Americas member

Rank	Nation	Gold	Silver	Bronze	Total
1	United States	7	1	2	10
2	Brazil	5	3	4	12
3	Argentina	3	7	5	15
4	Puerto Rico	3	5	2	10
5	Venezuela	1	1	1	3
6	Mexico	1	0	1	2
7	Canada	0	2	4	6
8	Uruguay	0	1	0	1
9	Dominican Republic	0	0	1	1
Totals (9 entries)		20	20	20	60

== Participating nations ==
=== 1980–2025 ===
Argentina, Brazil, Canada and Puerto Rico are the only four teams that have contested all the editions of the tournament. United States has the most titles with seven.

Nation	(Puerto Rico) 1980	(Brazil) 1984	(Uruguay) 1988	(Mexico) 1989	(United States) 1992	(Puerto Rico) 1993	(Argentina) 1995	(Uruguay) 1997	(Puerto Rico) 1999	(Argentina) 2001	(Puerto Rico) 2003	(Dominican Republic) 2005	(United States) 2007	(Puerto Rico) 2009	(Argentina) 2011	(Venezuela) 2013	(Mexico) 2015	(Argentina) (Colombia) (Uruguay) 2017	(Brazil) 2022	(Nicaragua) 2025
Argentina	3rd	7th	5th	8th	5th	3rd	2nd	4th	3rd	1st	2nd	2nd	2nd	3rd	1st	3rd	2nd	2nd	1st	2nd
Bahamas	–	–	–	–	–	–	8th	–	–	–	–	–	–	–	–	–	–	–	–	11th
Barbados	–	–	–	–	–	–	10th	–	–	–	–	–	–	–	–	–	–	–	–	–
Brazil	4th	1st	1st	3rd	3rd	4th	3rd	3rd	6th	2nd	7th	1st	4th	1st	2nd	9th	9th	10th	2nd	1st
Canada	2nd	3rd	3rd	5th	6th	7th	4th	5th	2nd	3rd	4th	9th	5th	4th	6th	6th	3rd	8th	4th	4th
Colombia	–	–	–	–	–	–	–	–	–	–	–	–	–	–	–	–	–	11th	9th	8th
Cuba	6th	8th	–	7th	9th	5th	5th	6th	10th	–	–	–	–	–	10th	–	10th	–	–	–
Dominican Republic	–	9th	–	6th	–	9th	7th	9th	7th	–	8th	6th	–	5th	3rd	4th	6th	7th	8th	5th
Ecuador	–	–	–	12th	–	–	–	–	–	–	–	–	–	–	–	–	–	–	–	–
Jamaica	–	–	–	–	–	–	–	–	–	–	–	–	–	–	–	8th	–	–	–	–
Mexico	5th	5th	6th	9th	7th	–	–	10th	–	9th	6th	10th	7th	7th	–	1st	4th	3rd	6th	–
Nicaragua	–	–	–	–	–	–	–	–	–	–	–	–	–	–	–	–	–	–	–	10th
Panama	–	4th	–	11th	8th	8th	–	–	9th	6th	–	5th	9th	8th	8th	–	7th	12th	11th	12th
Paraguay	–	–	–	10th	–	–	–	–	–	–	–	–	–	–	9th	10th	–	–	–	–
Puerto Rico	1st	6th	2nd	1st	4th	2nd	1st	2nd	4th	4th	3rd	7th	3rd	2nd	4th	2nd	5th	5th	5th	6th
United States	–	–	–	2nd	1st	1st	–	1st	1st	10th	1st	4th	1st	–	–	–	–	1st	3rd	3rd
Uruguay	7th	2nd	4th	–	10th	10th	6th	8th	8th	8th	9th	8th	6th	6th	7th	7th	8th	6th	10th	7th
Venezuela	–	–	7th	4th	2nd	6th	9th	7th	5th	5th	5th	3rd	8th	9th	5th	5th	1st	9th	7th	9th
Virgin Islands	–	–	–	–	–	–	–	–	–	7th	10th	–	10th	10th	–	–	–	4th	12th	–
Total	7	9	7	12	10	10	10	10	10	10	10	10	10	10	10	10	10	12	12	12

=== 2029–present ===
Nation	(N/A) 2029	App.
Argentina		20
Bahamas		2
Barbados		1
Brazil		20
Canada		20
Colombia		3
Cuba		10
Dominican Republic		15
Ecuador		1
Jamaica		1
Mexico		15
Nicaragua		1
Panama		14
Paraguay		3
Puerto Rico		20
United States		12
Uruguay		19
Venezuela		18
Virgin Islands		6
Total	12	

== Debut of teams ==
A total of 19 national teams have appeared in at least one FIBA AmeriCup in the history of the tournament through the 2025 competition. Each successive AmeriCup has had at least one team appearing for the first time. Countries competing in their first AmeriCup are listed below by year.

Year	Debutants	Number
1980	Argentina, Brazil, Canada, Cuba, Mexico, Puerto Rico, Uruguay	7
1984	Dominican Republic, Panama	9
1988	Venezuela	10
1989	Ecuador, Paraguay, United States	13
1992	None	13
1993	None	13
1995	Bahamas, Barbados	15
1997	None	15
1999	None	15
2001	Virgin Islands	16
2003	None	16
2005	None	16
2007	None	16
2009	None	16
2011	None	16
2013	Jamaica	17
2015	None	17
2017	Colombia	18
2022	None	18
2025	Nicaragua	19
2029	To be determined	19
Total		19

== Tournament awards and records ==
=== Most Valuable Player ===
Most recent award winner (2025)

Year	Winner
2025	(Brazil) Yago dos Santos

=== All-Tournament Team ===
Most recent award winners (2025)

Year	Player	Position	Team
2025	Yago dos Santos	Guard	Brazil
2025	Javonte Smart	Guard	United States
2025	Kyshawn George	Forward	Canada
2025	Bruno Caboclo	Forward	Brazil
2025	Juan Fernández	Center	Argentina

== See also ==
- FIBA World Cup
- Summer Olympic Games
- Pan American Games
- Centrobasket
- South American Championship
- South American Championship for Women
- FIBA Under-18 Americas Championship
- FIBA Under-16 Americas Championship
- FIBA Women's AmeriCup
