= Bahamas men's national basketball team =

Team representing the Bahamas in international men's basketball

Bahamas
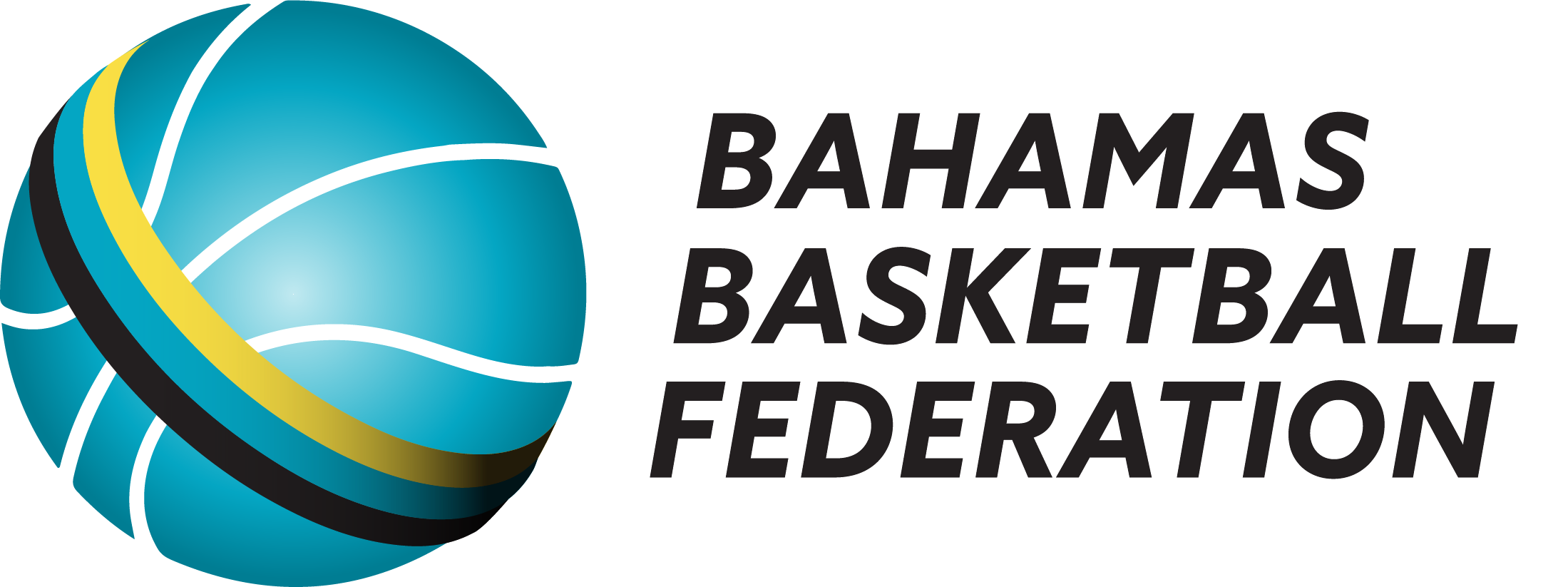
- FIBA ranking: 49 (1 September 2026)
- Joined FIBA: 1962
- FIBA zone: FIBA Americas
- National federation: Bahamas Basketball Federation
- Coach: Mikhail McLean

FIBA AmeriCup
- Appearances: 2
Home	Away

The Bahamas men's national basketball team represents The Bahamas in international basketball. The team is controlled by the Bahamas Basketball Federation.

The Bahamas has traditionally been the dominant nation at the official Caribbean Basketball Championship as it won more gold medals and more overall medals than any contender.

== History ==
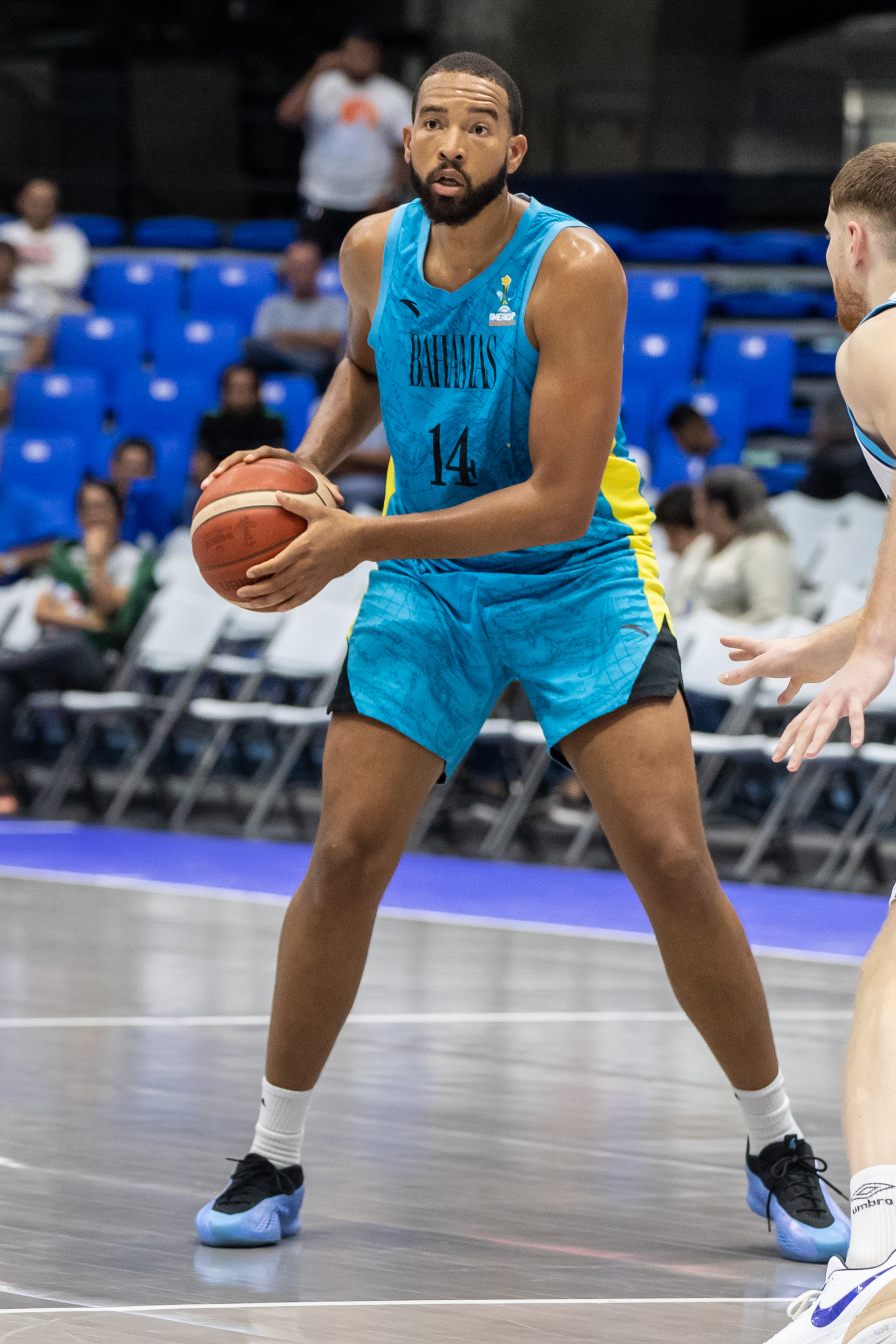
Isaiah Mobley playing for the national team in 2025

Basketball in the Bahamas has grown steadily since the mid-20th century, with the sport gaining popularity in schools and community programs. The Bahamas Basketball Federation (BBF) was founded in 1962, shortly before the country’s independence, and joined FIBA in 1962, making the Bahamas one of the earliest Caribbean nations to compete in international basketball.

The national team made its international debut in regional competitions in the 1970s, participating in the Caribbean Basketball Championship and establishing itself as one of the strongest basketball nations in the Caribbean. The Bahamas won multiple gold medals at the Caribbean Championship, including titles in 1982, 1995, and 1998, cementing its reputation in the region.

On the continental stage, the Bahamas has participated in several editions of the FIBA AmeriCup qualifiers and the Centrobasket tournament, often competing against Central and South American powerhouses such as Puerto Rico, Mexico, and Dominican Republic. While the team has not yet qualified for a FIBA World Cup or the Olympic Games, it has remained a consistent competitor in the Americas region.

The 2010s and 2020s saw a rise in Bahamian talent playing in the NBA and overseas professional leagues, including players such as Eric Gordon, Buddy Hield, Deandre Ayton, Kai Jones, and V. J. Edgecombe, who have strengthened the visibility of Bahamian basketball internationally. In August 2023, the Bahamas achieved one of its most significant milestones by winning the Pre-Olympic Qualifying Tournament in Argentina, defeating top regional teams and earning a place in the 2024 FIBA Olympic Qualifiers for Paris.

Today, the Bahamas men’s national basketball team continues to compete in FIBA competitions with a long-term goal of qualifying for the FIBA Basketball World Cup and the Olympic Games, building on the momentum created by its NBA stars and regional dominance.

== Competitive record ==
=== FIBA AmeriCup ===
FIBA AmeriCup Record
Year	Position	Pld	W	L
(Puerto Rico) 1980	did not participate			
(Brazil) 1984	did not participate			
(Uruguay) 1988	did not participate			
(Mexico) 1989	did not participate			
(United States) 1992	did not participate			
(Puerto Rico) 1993	did not participate			
(Argentina) 1995	Eighth place	8	2	6
(Uruguay) 1997	did not participate			
(Puerto Rico) 1999	did not participate			
(Argentina) 2001	did not participate			
(Puerto Rico) 2003	did not participate			
(Dominican Republic) 2005	did not participate			
(United States) 2007	did not participate			
(Puerto Rico) 2009	did not participate			
(Argentina) 2011	did not participate			
(Venezuela) 2013	did not participate			
(Mexico) 2015	did not participate			
(Argentina) (Colombia) (Uruguay) 2017	did not participate			
(Brazil) 2022	did not qualify			
(Nicaragua) 2025	Eleventh place	3	0	3
Total		11	2	9

=== Pan American Games ===
- 1975 – 9th place
- 1991 – 8th place

=== Centrobasket Championship ===
- 1975 – 5th place
- 1985 – 8th place
- 1989 – 8th place
- 1995 – 5th place
- 2003 – 5th place
- 2012 – 5th place
- 2014 – 7th place
- 2016 – 7th place

=== CBC Championship ===
- 1982 – (gold)
- 1984 – (gold)
- 1985 – (gold)
- 1991 – (gold)
- 1993 – (gold)
- 1995 – (gold)
- 1996 – (bronze)
- 1998 – (bronze)
- 2002 – 4th place
- 2004 – 5th place
- 2006 – 4th place
- 2007 – 4th place
- 2009 – 5th place
- 2011 – (silver)
- 2014 – (gold)
- 2015 – (silver)

== Team ==
=== Current roster ===
Roster for the 2025 FIBA AmeriCup.

Bahamas men's national basketball team roster
Players
Coaches

Pos.	No.	Name	Age – Date of birth	Height	Club	Ctr.
G	0	Garvin Clarke	23 – 15 September 2001	1.83 m (6 ft 0 in)	CB L'Horta Godella	(Spain)
PG	2	Dominick Bridgewater	25 – 14 May 2000	1.78 m (5 ft 10 in)	Fos Provence Basket	(France)
G	3	Franco Miller Jr.	26 – 9 February 1999	1.88 m (6 ft 2 in)	Florida Gulf Coast Eagles	(United States)
SF	4	Wilkenson Isnord	25 – 30 March 2000	1.98 m (6 ft 6 in)	GBA Sojky Pelhřimov	(Czech Republic)
G	5	Rashad Davis	28 – 29 October 1996	1.85 m (6 ft 1 in)	Vendée Challans Basket	(France)
SF	9	Joshua Dames	25 – 25 July 2000	1.88 m (6 ft 2 in)	Kansas Community College	(United States)
PF	11	Samuel Hunter	24 – 28 November 2000	2.03 m (6 ft 8 in)	BC Trepca	(Kosovo)
SF	12	Kentwan Smith	33 – 17 December 1991	2.03 m (6 ft 8 in)	BC Luleå	(Sweden)
C	14	Isaiah Mobley	25 – 24 September 1999	2.03 m (6 ft 8 in)	Delaware Blue Coats	(United States)
C	15	Jaraun Burrows	39 – 4 September 1985	1.98 m (6 ft 6 in)	Andrézieux-Bouthéon	(France)
PF	18	Lathaniel Bastian	27 – 12 May 1998	2.00 m (6 ft 7 in)	Pays Salonais Basket	(France)

Head coach

- (The Bahamas) Lourawls Nairn Jr.

Assistant coach(es)

- (The Bahamas) Nashad Mackey

Legend

- (C) Team captain
- Club – describes last
  club before the tournament
- Age – describes age
  on 22 August 2025

=== Past rosters ===
At 2009 FIBA CBC Championship:

The Bahamas men's national basketball team roster
Players
Coaches

Pos.	No.	Name	Age – Date of birth	Height	Club
G	4	Quentin Hall	33 – 1 July 1977	1.74 m (5 ft 9 in)	TBB Trier	(Germany)
G	5	Alonzo Hinds	26 – 5 March 1984	1.83 m (6 ft 0 in)	Newberry College	(United States)
G	6	Brian Bain	29 – 11 June 1981	1.90 m (6 ft 3 in)	Armstrong Atlantic State University	(United States)
C	7	Jeremy Hutchinson	30 – 7 February 1980		Real Deal Shockers	(United States)
F	8	Jeffrey Henfield	24 – 30 November 1985	1.93 m (6 ft 4 in)	Gallup Talons	(United States)
F	9	Scott Forbes	35 – 23 June 1975	1.96 m (6 ft 5 in)	JSF Nanterre	(France)
F	10	Torrington Cox	24 – 30 September 1985	2.01 m (6 ft 7 in)	King University	(United States)
F	11	Cordero Seymour	23 – 15 May 1987	1.96 m (6 ft 5 in)	Dickinson State University	(United States)
F	12	Quentin Demeritte	28 – 13 April 1982	1.98 m (6 ft 6 in)	Central Oregon Hotshots	(United States)
F/C	14	Doyle Hudson	26 – 27 January 1984	2.08 m (6 ft 10 in)	University of Pittsburgh	(United States)
C	15	Gjio Bain	25 – 15 July 1985	2.13 m (7 ft 0 in)	Free agent

Head coach

- (The Bahamas) Mario Bowleg

Assistant coach(es)

- (The Bahamas)
- (The Bahamas)
- (The Bahamas)

Athletic trainer(s)

- (The Bahamas)

At the 2016 Centrobasket:

The Bahamas men's national basketball team roster
Players
Coaches

Pos.	No.	Name	Age – Date of birth	Height	Club	Ctr.
G	1	Michael Carey	–	1.96 m (6 ft 5 in)	Wagner Seahawks men's basketball	(United States)
G	3	Jaron Cornish	22 – 2 August 1993	1.80 m (5 ft 11 in)	-	(The Bahamas)
PG	4	Lourawls Nairn	21 – 8 August 1994	1.74 m (5 ft 9 in)	-	(The Bahamas)
F	5	Travis Munnings	21 – 14 September 1994	1.93 m (6 ft 4 in)	Louisiana–Monroe Warhawks men's basketball	(United States)
F	6	D’Shon Taylor	23 – 18 January 1993	1.98 m (6 ft 6 in)	Norfolk State Spartans men's basketball	(United States)
SF	7	Jean Cadot	29 – 7 May 1987	1.95 m (6 ft 5 in)	Real Canoe NC (basketball)	(Spain)
SF	8	Kentwan Smith	24 – 17 December 1991	2.03 m (6 ft 8 in)	Garonne Asptt Basket (nationale 2, France)	(France)
SF	9	Eugene Bain	27 – 14 November 1988	1.96 m (6 ft 5 in)	Cybiots	(The Bahamas)
C	10	Deandre Ayton	19 – 23 July 1998	2.13 m (7 ft 0 in)	Phoenix Suns	(United States)
C	15	Jaraun Burrows	33 – 4 September 1985	2.03 m (6 ft 8 in)	Forca Lleida	(Spain)
F	12	David Nesbitt	25 – 10 February 1991	2.00 m (6 ft 7 in)	Minas Tênis Clube	(Brazil)
G	14	Leon Cooper	25 – 20 February 1991	1.85 m (6 ft 1 in)	Ohud Medina (basketball)	(Saudi Arabia)
G	15	Taran Cox	28 – 17 November 1987	1.87 m (6 ft 2 in)	Al-Madina SC	(Libya)

Head coach

- (United States) Chris Demarco

Assistant coach(es)

- (The Bahamas) Norris Bain
- (The Bahamas) Perry Thompson Jr

Legend

- Club – describes last
  club before the tournament
- Age – describes age
  on 19 June 2016

Roster for the 2022 FIBA AmeriCup qualification matches played on 19 and 20 February 2021 against the United States and Puerto Rico.

The Bahamas men's national basketball team roster
Players
Coaches

Pos.	No.	Name	Age – Date of birth	Height	Club	Ctr.
G	1	Michael Carey	27 – 18 August 1993	1.98 m (6 ft 6 in)
PG	2	Dominick Bridgewater	20 – 14 May 2000	1.78 m (5 ft 10 in)	Fos Provence Basket	(France)
PG	3	Godfrey Rolle	24 – 30 October 1996	1.80 m (5 ft 11 in)	Southwest Baptist Bearcats	(United States)
PG	4	Jaron Cornish	25 – 2 October 1995	1.80 m (5 ft 11 in)	Zornotza ST	(Spain)
F	6	Mychel Thompson	32 – 1 June 1988	2.01 m (6 ft 7 in)
F	7	Travis Munnings	26 – 14 September 1994	1.98 m (6 ft 6 in)	U.D. Oliveirense	(Portugal)
F	8	Nashad Mackey	24 – 26 July 1996	1.98 m (6 ft 6 in)	Embry–Riddle Eagles	(United States)
F	9	D’Shon Taylor	28 – 18 January 1993	1.96 m (6 ft 5 in)	Commonwealth Bank Giants	(The Bahamas)
PF	10	David Nesbitt	30 – 10 February 1991	2.03 m (6 ft 8 in)	Minas Tênis Clube	(Brazil)
F	11	Aaron Levarity	23 – 16 April 1997	2.03 m (6 ft 8 in)	Svendborg Rabbits	(Denmark)
F	12	Kentwan Smith	29 – 17 December 1991	2.04 m (6 ft 8 in)	Garonne Avenir Basket du Marmandais	(France)
F	13	Tavario Miller	26 – 26 February 1994	2.03 m (6 ft 8 in)	Boca Juniors	(Argentina)

Head coach

- (The Bahamas) Mario Bowleg

Assistant coach(es)

- (The Bahamas) Moses Johnson
- (The Bahamas) Perry Thompson Jr

Legend

- Club – describes last
  club before the tournament
- Age – describes age
  on 20 February 2021

Roster for the 2024 FIBA Men's Olympic Qualifying Tournaments.

The Bahamas men's national basketball team roster
Players
Coaches

Pos.	No.	Name	Age – Date of birth	Height	Club	Ctr.
C	1	Deandre Ayton	25 – 23 July 1998	2.13 m (7 ft 0 in)	Portland Trail Blazers	(United States)
G	3	Franco Miller Jr.	24 – 2 September 1999	1.88 m (6 ft 2 in)	Florida Gulf Coast Eagles	(United States)
F	6	Travis Munnings	29 – 14 September 1994	1.98 m (6 ft 6 in)	Élan Béarnais	(France)
SG	7	Buddy Hield	31 – 17 December 1992	1.93 m (6 ft 4 in)	Golden State Warriors	(United States)
G	8	V. J. Edgecombe	18 – 30 July 2005	1.98 m (6 ft 6 in)	Philadelphia 76ers	(United States)
F	9	Donavan Freeman	18 – 14 August 2005	2.10 m (6 ft 11 in)	Syracuse Orange	(United States)
SG	10	Eric Gordon	35 – 25 December 1988	1.93 m (6 ft 4 in)	Phoenix Suns	(United States)
PG	11	Lourawls Nairn Jr.	29 – 17 December 1994	1.78 m (5 ft 10 in)	Free agent
F	12	Kentwan Smith	32 – 17 December 1991	2.04 m (6 ft 8 in)	BC Luleå	(Sweden)
PG	13	Deyton Albury	22 – 11 April 2002	1.88 m (6 ft 2 in)	Utah State Aggies	(United States)
PF	14	Sammy Hunter	23 – 28 November 2000	2.05 m (6 ft 9 in)	Akron Zips	(United States)
C	15	Jaraun Burrows	38 – 4 September 1985	2.03 m (6 ft 8 in)	ABLS Basket	(France)

Head coach

- (United States) Chris DeMarco

Assistant coach(es)

- (The Bahamas) Mikhail McLean
- (The Bahamas) Moses Johnson

Legend

- Club – describes last
  club before the tournament
- Age – describes age
  on 2 July 2024

== Head coaching history ==
- (United States) Larry Brown – 2011–2012
- (United States) Larry Eustachy – 2014
- (The Bahamas) Mario Bowleg – 2015–2018
- (The Bahamas) Norris Bain – 2019
- (United States) Chris DeMarco – 2019–2025
- (The Bahamas) Lourawls Nairn Jr. – 2025
- (The Bahamas) Mikhail McLean - since 2026

== Uniform ==
=== Manufacturer ===
2015: Under Armour

2017–2021: Nike

2022–present: Anta

== See also ==
- Bahamas women's national basketball team
- Bahamas men's national under-18 basketball team
- Bahamas men's national under-15 and under-16 basketball team
