= Rashad Davis =

Bahamian basketball player (born 1996)

Caen Basket Calvados
- Position: Guard
- League: LNB Pro B

Personal information
- Born: October 29, 1996 (age 30) Nassau, The Bahamas
- Listed height: 1.85 m (6 ft 1 in)

Career information
- College: UT Arlington (2018–2020); Florida International (2020–2021)

Career history
- 2021–2022: Fundación CB Granada
- 2022–2024: Vendée Challans Basket
- 2024–present: Caen Basket Calvados

Rashad-Roger Davis (born 29 October 1996) is a Bahamian professional basketball player who plays as a guard for Caen Basket Calvados in LNB Pro B in France and the Bahamas men's national basketball team.

== High school career ==
Davis played basketball at Ouachita Parish High School. He was recognized as the team’s best on-ball defender and often tasked with guarding opponents’ top scorers. In a 2021 game against top-ranked West Monroe High School, Davis held Dallas Baptist signee Javion Richard to just eight points while contributing five points, three rebounds and three assists in a 51–36 victory.

== Professional career ==
In 2023, Davis signed with Vendée Challans Basket of France, competing in Nationale Masculine 1.

In the 2024–25 season, Davis averaged 9.4 points, 3.9 rebounds, and 1.2 assists per game playing for Caen Basket Calvados. He also posted a field goal percentage of 42.1%, a three-point percentage of 29.6%, and a free throw rate of 69.2%.

== National team career ==
Davis is a regular member of the Bahamas men's national team. In the 2023 FIBA Basketball World Cup qualification (Americas), he put up 5.3 points, 2.3 rebounds, and 1.0 assist per game. According to advanced metric rankings, Davis led his team with a 16.4 Player Efficiency Rating (PER) in the 2024 qualifiers, ranking second in the Bahamas’ team advanced stats.

During the 2025 FIBA AmeriCup qualification, he averaged 7.3 points, 3.5 rebounds, and 1.3 assists per game across six appearances.

Davis has also appeared in youth international competition. In the 2013 FIBA U17 Centrobasket, he averaged 15.8 points and 8.4 rebounds per game.

Davis has been a member of the Bahamas men's national team, representing the country at the 2025 FIBA AmeriCup.
