= Jackson Rowe =

Canadian basketball player (born 1997)

No. 44 – Ironi Ness Ziona
- Position: Power forward
- League: Israeli Basketball Premier League

Personal information
- Born: January 4, 1997 (age 29) Toronto, Ontario, Canada
- Listed height: 6 ft 6 in (1.98 m)
- Listed weight: 210 lb (95 kg)

Career information
- High school: Wasatch Academy (Mount Pleasant, Utah)
- College: Cal State Fullerton (2016–2020)
- NBA draft: 2020: undrafted
- Playing career: 2020–present

Career history
- 2020–2021: Chorale Roanne
- 2021–2022: Norrköping Dolphins
- 2022: Ottawa BlackJacks
- 2022–2023: medi bayreuth
- 2023: Ottawa BlackJacks
- 2023–2024: Santa Cruz Warriors
- 2024: Scarborough Shooting Stars
- 2024–2025: Santa Cruz Warriors
- 2025: Golden State Warriors
- 2025: →Santa Cruz Warriors
- 2025–present: Ironi Ness Ziona

Career highlights
- CEBL All-Canadian Team (2023); SBL champion (2022); SBL Forward of the Year (2022); Second-team All-Big West (2020); Big West Freshman of the Year (2017)
- Stats at NBA.com
- Stats at Basketball Reference

Jackson Rowe (born January 4, 1997) is a Canadian professional basketball player for Ironi Ness Ziona of the Israeli Basketball Premier League.

He played college basketball for the Cal State Fullerton Titans, where he earned Big West Freshman of the Year honors in 2017, and second-team All-Big West honors in 2020.

Rowe won a Swedish Basketball League championship and SBL Forward of the Year honors with the Norrköping Dolphins in 2022. He subsequently played in the Canadian Elite Basketball League for the Ottawa BlackJacks—earning CEBL All-Canadian Team recognition in 2023. Following two seasons in the NBA G League with the Santa Cruz Warriors, he signed a two-way contract with the Golden State Warriors in January 2025 and appeared in six NBA games before joining Ironi Ness Ziona in December 2025. Internationally, he has represented the Canada men's national basketball team in FIBA competition since 2023.

== High school career ==
Rowe played four years of varsity basketball at Wasatch Academy in Mount Pleasant, Utah, graduating in 2016. As a senior, he averaged 15.5 points, 10.2 rebounds, 3.4 steals, and 2.1 blocks per game on 71.4% shooting from the field. That season, he helped lead the Tigers to a 29–4 record and a No. 14 finish in the USA Today Super 25 Expert Rankings, while earning Boys' Basketball Mid-Utah Radio Defensive Player of the Year honors.

== College career ==
Rowe played four seasons of college basketball at Cal State Fullerton from 2016 to 2020, appearing in 111 games with career averages of 12.1 points and 7.3 rebounds per game. Named the Big West Freshman of the Year in 2017 and an All-Big West honorable mention in 2018 and 2019, he averaged a team-leading 15.6 points and 31.0 minutes, 7.4 rebounds, 1.9 assists, 1.1 steals , and 1.2 blocks per game while shooting 46.7% from the floor and 40.7% from three-point range over 20 games as a senior, to earn second-team All-Big West honors. He finished his career ranked second in program history in rebounds (811) and blocks (113), fourth in double-doubles (21), and tenth in scoring (1,340 points).

== Professional career ==
=== Chorale Roanne (2020–2021) ===
On May 5, 2020, Rowe signed his first professional contract with Chorale Roanne of the French LNB Pro A. In six appearances during the 2020–21 season, he averaged 5.0 points and 2.0 rebounds in 12.2 minutes per game while shooting 50.0% from the field. Later that year, he went undrafted in the 2020 NBA draft.

=== Norrköping Dolphins (2021–2022) ===
On July 17, 2021, Rowe signed with the Norrköping Dolphins of the Swedish Basketball League (SBL). In 46 regular-season and playoff games during the 2021–22 season, he averaged 26.3 minutes, 16.3 points, 7.4 rebounds, 1.9 assists, and 1.1 steals per game, while shooting 52.6% from the floor, with 10 double-doubles. He was named the SBL Forward of the Year, and helped the Dolphins capture the 2022 Swedish championship.

=== Ottawa BlackJacks (2023) ===
On March 2, 2022, Rowe signed with the Ottawa BlackJacks of the Canadian Elite Basketball League (CEBL). In 13 games during the 2022 season, he averaged 24.8 minutes, 9.4 points, 6.2 rebounds, 1.7 assists, and a team-leading 1.1 blocks in 24.8 minutes per game.

=== medi bayreuth (2022–2023) ===
On July 4, 2022, Rowe signed with medi bayreuth of the German Basketball Bundesliga. In 32 league appearances during the 2022–23 season, he averaged 10.8 points, 5.2 rebounds, 2.3 assists, and 1.1 steals in 27.5 minutes per game.

=== Return to Ottawa (2023) ===
On March 14, 2023, Rowe re-signed with the Ottawa BlackJacks. In 18 games during the 2023 season, he averaged 15.3 points, 6.6 rebounds, and 1.9 assists in 27.7 minutes per game, while shooting 50.9% from the floor and 42.3% from three-point range, earning a selection to the CEBL All-Canadian Team.

=== Santa Cruz Warriors (2023–2024) ===
On October 30, 2023, Rowe joined the Santa Cruz Warriors after a tryout. In 49 games during the 2023–24 season, he averaged 12.4 points, 6.3 rebounds, 2.2 assists, 1.1 blocks, and 1.2 steals in 30 minutes per game.

=== Scarborough Shooting Stars (2024) ===
On May 3, 2024, Rowe signed with the Scarborough Shooting Stars of the Canadian Elite Basketball League, playing nine games and averaging 14.9 points, 7.7 rebounds, 2.9 assists, and 1.8 steals in 30.3 minutes per game, while shooting 48.5% from the floor.

=== Golden State Warriors / Return to Santa Cruz (2024–2025) ===
After joining them for the 2024 NBA Summer League, Rowe signed with the Golden State Warriors on July 19, 2024, but was waived on October 19. On October 28, he rejoined the Santa Cruz Warriors and on January 28, 2025, he signed a two-way contract with Golden State.

After appearing in six NBA games during the 2024–25 season—averaging 3.7 points, 1.8 rebounds, and 0.7 assists in 8.7 minutes per game—Rowe did not make any appearances for the Warriors during the 2025–26 season. On December 1, 2025, he was waived by Golden State to make room for the signing of LJ Cryer.

=== Ironi Ness Ziona (2025–present) ===
On December 17, 2025, Rowe signed with Ironi Ness Ziona of the Israeli Israeli Basketball Premier League. In 21 league games during the 2025–26 season, he averaged 29.4 minutes, 12.3 points, 6.7 rebounds, 2.7 assists, and 1.3 steals per game, while shooting 48.4% from the floor.

He then re-signed with the club on July 11, 2026, for the 2026–27 season.

== National team career ==
Rowe made his senior debut with the Canada men's national basketball team in the FIBA World Cup 2023 Americas Qualifiers in February 2023, averaging 10.0 points, 5.0 rebounds, and 1.5 assists per game in two appearances. He subsequently represented Canada in the FIBA AmeriCup 2025 Qualifiers, averaging 13.7 points, 7.7 rebounds, and 1.3 assists in three games, and in the FIBA Basketball World Cup 2027 Americas Qualifiers, averaging 7.5 points, 3.0 rebounds, and 1.0 assist in four games.

== Career statistics ==
Legend
GP	Games played	GS	Games started	MPG	Minutes per game
FG%	Field goal percentage	3P%	3-point field goal percentage	FT%	Free throw percentage
RPG	Rebounds per game	APG	Assists per game	SPG	Steals per game
BPG	Blocks per game	PPG	Points per game	**Bold**	Career high

=== NBA ===
Year	Team	GP	GS	MPG	FG%	3P%	FT%	RPG	APG	SPG	BPG	PPG
2024–25	Golden State	6	0	8.7	.471	.300	.500	1.8	.7	.7	.0	3.7
Career		6	0	8.7	.471	.300	.500	1.8	.7	.7	.0	3.7

=== College ===
Year	Team	GP	GS	MPG	FG%	3P%	FT%	RPG	APG	SPG	BPG	PPG
2016–17	Cal State Fullerton	27	26	29.6	.546	.341	.707	7.2	**1.9**	.6	.8	10.4
2017–18	Cal State Fullerton	31	**31**	30.0	**.581**	**.414**	**.777**	6.7	1.6	.9	1.0	12.1
2018–19	Cal State Fullerton	**33**	**31**	**31.1**	.541	.304	.674	**7.9**	1.8	.6	1.1	11.3
2019–20	Cal State Fullerton	20	19	31.0	.467	.407	.678	7.4	**1.9**	**1.1**	**1.3**	**15.6**
Career		111	107	30.4	.535	.373	.709	7.3	1.8	.8	1.0	12.1

== Personal life ==
The son of Roger Rowe and Barbara McWaters, he has two siblings. He majored in kinesiology.
