= Garvin Clarke =

Bahamian–American basketball player

Caja 87 Sevilla
- Position: Shooting guard
- League: Segunda FEB (Spain)

Personal information
- Born: 15 September 2001 (age 25) Euclid, Ohio, United States
- Listed height: 183 cm (6 ft 0 in)
- Listed weight: 184 lb (83 kg)

Career information
- College: Akron; IUP
- Playing career: 2024–present

Career history
- 2024–present: CB L'Horta Godella

Garvin Clarke (born 15 September 2001) is a Bahamian–American professional basketball player who plays as a Shooting guard for Caja 87 Sevilla in Spain’s **Segunda FEB** and represents the Bahamas men's national basketball team.

== College career ==
Clarke began his college career at Akron, appearing in 80 games over three seasons and scoring a total of 200 points. In July 2021, he was selected to join the Bahamas national team while still at Akron—a notable honor for the young guard.

He later transferred to IUP, where in the 2023–24 season he averaged approximately 18.1 points, 6.1 rebounds, and 5.6 assists per game, earning All-PSAC West First Team honors.

== Professional career ==
In September 2024, Clarke began his professional career in Spain’s **Segunda FEB**, signing with CB L'Horta Godella. He quickly became a key player, averaging about 10.8 points, 3.5 rebounds, and 3.6 assists per game during the 2024–25 season.

== International career ==
Clarke has been an integral member of the Bahamas men's national basketball team. In the 2025 FIBA AmeriCup qualification, he contributed approximately 7 points, 5.5 rebounds, and 4 assists per game.
