= Robert Baker (basketball) =

American basketball player (born 1998)

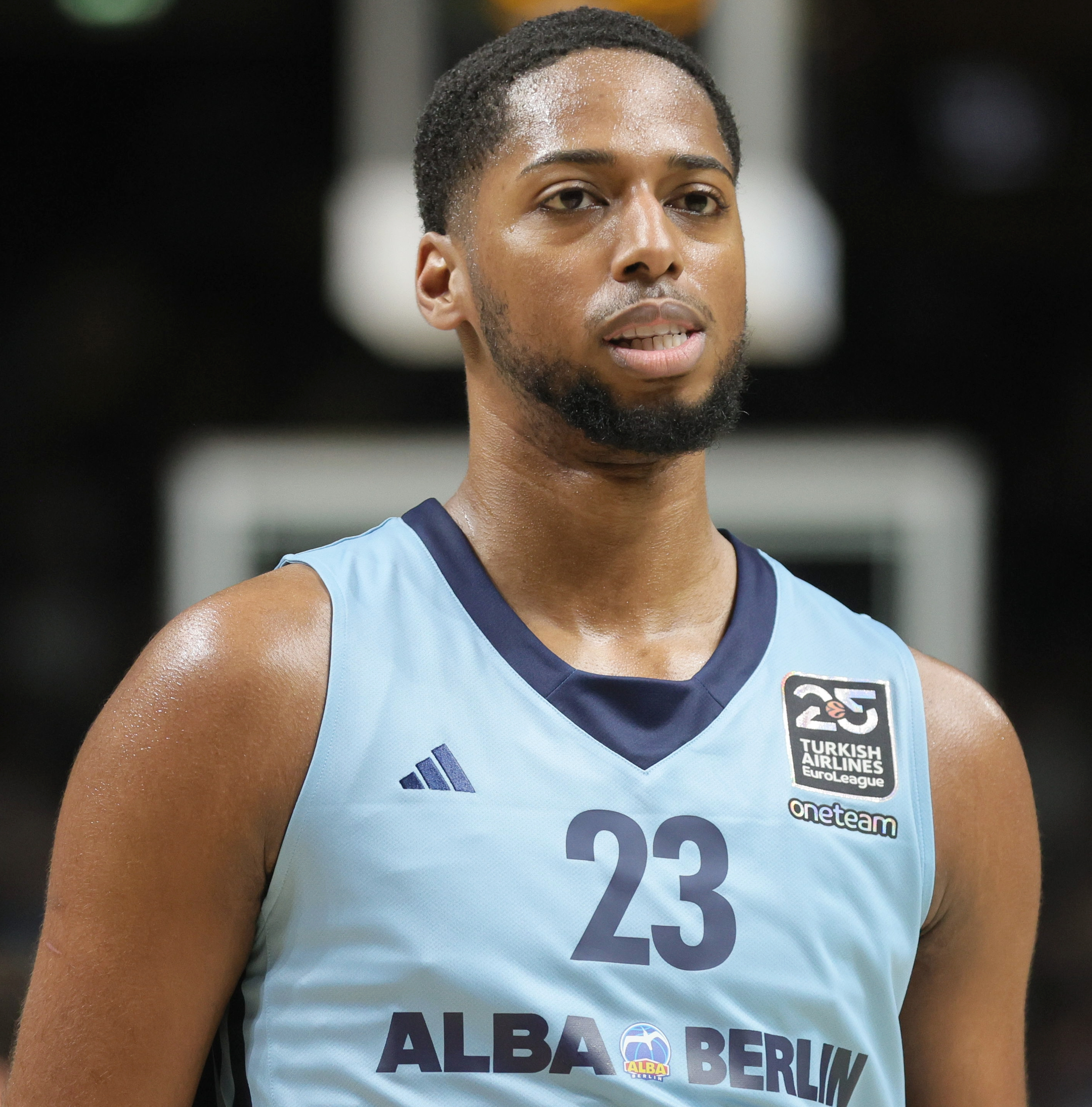
- Baker with Alba Berlin in 2025

Free agent
- Position: Power forward / center

Personal information
- Born: June 28, 1998 (age 28) Woodstock, Georgia, U.S.
- Listed height: 6 ft 10 in (2.08 m)
- Listed weight: 210 lb (95 kg)

Career information
- High school: The Walker School (Marietta, Georgia)
- College: Harvard (2016–2020)
- NBA draft: 2020: undrafted
- Playing career: 2021–present

Career history
- 2021: Iskra Svit
- 2021–2022: Stockton Kings
- 2022–2023: Lakeland Magic
- 2023: Cariduros de Fajardo
- 2023: Akita Northern Happinets
- 2024: College Park Skyhawks
- 2024: NBA G League United
- 2024–2025: Osceola Magic
- 2025: Alba Berlin
- 2025–2026: New Zealand Breakers

Career highlights
- NBL Ignite Cup winner (2026)
- Stats at NBA.com
- Stats at Basketball Reference
Medals
Men's basketball
Representing the United States
FIBA AmeriCup
Bronze medal – third place	2025 Managua

Robert Baker II (born June 28, 1998) is an American professional basketball player who last played for the New Zealand Breakers of the Australian National Basketball League (NBL). He played college basketball for the Harvard Crimson.

== High school career ==
Baker attended The Walker School in Marietta, Georgia where he captained the team for three years while becoming the all-time leading scorer with 1,535 career points. He received first team All-State, All-Region, All-County, and team MVP honors as a junior and senior.

== College career ==
Baker played for the Harvard Crimson playing in 99 games and starting 39. He averaged 4.5 points, 3.6 rebounds, and 14.9 minutes per game, while shooting 44.2 percent from the field, 33.5 percent from beyond the arc, and 77.5 percent from the free throw line. As a senior, he played 29 games and started 26 while averaging 7.0 points, 5.3 rebounds, and 22.3 minutes while shooting 47.2 percent from the field, 35.6 percent from 3-point distance, and 81.8 percent on free throws, which earned him the team's John Harnice '84 Spirit Award.

== Professional career ==
=== Iskra Svit (2021) ===
After going undrafted in the 2020 NBA draft, Baker signed with Iskra Svit of the Slovak Basketball League on February 1, 2021. In 14 games, he averaged 14.1 points, 6.9 rebounds, 0.9 assists, 1.2 steals and 1.7 blocks in 29.7 minutes.

=== Stockton Kings (2021–2022) ===
On October 25, 2021, Baker signed with the Stockton Kings of the NBA G League where he played 26 games and averaged 4.0 points, 2.3 rebounds and 0.2 assists in 10.4 minutes.

=== Lakeland Magic (2022–2023) ===
After joining the Oklahoma City Thunder for the 2022 NBA Summer League, Baker was traded to the Lakeland Magic on September 12, 2022. In 32 games, he averaged 11.2 points, 6.7 rebounds, 1.6 assists, 1.2 steals and 2.0 blocks in 24.8 minutes.

=== Cariduros de Fajardo (2023) ===
On April 16, 2023, Baker signed with the Cariduros de Fajardo of the Baloncesto Superior Nacional, playing in eight games and averaged 8.3 points, 5.1 rebounds, 0.8 assists and 1.1 block in 15.7 minutes.

=== Akita Northern Happinets (2023) ===
After joining the Orlando Magic for the 2023 NBA Summer League, Baker signed with the Akita Northern Happinets of the B.League on July 25, 2023 where he played 14 games and averaged 8.9 points, 6.5 rebounds, 0.8 assists and 1.2 steals in 24.9 minutes. On December 1, Baker left Akita.

=== College Park Skyhawks (2024) ===
On January 9, 2024, Baker joined the College Park Skyhawks, playing 29 games while averaging 14.7 points, 6.3 rebounds and 2.2 assists in 28.2 minutes.

=== Osceola Magic (2024–2025) ===
After joining the Atlanta Hawks for the 2024 NBA Summer League, Baker signed with the Orlando Magic on October 12, 2024, but was waived four days later. On October 27, he joined the Osceola Magic.

=== Alba Berlin (2025) ===
On February 26, 2025, Baker signed with German club Alba Berlin for the remainder of the season.

Baker joined the Indiana Pacers for the 2025 NBA Summer League.

=== New Zealand Breakers (2025–2026) ===
On August 8, 2025, Baker signed with the New Zealand Breakers of the Australian National Basketball League (NBL) for the 2025–26 season. On January 20, 2026, he was ruled out for the rest of the season with an ACL injury. In 21 games, he averaged 10.2 points and 4.8 rebounds per game.

== National team ==
Baker represented the United States men's national basketball team at the 2025 FIBA AmeriCup.
