= Juan Fernández (basketball, born 2002) =

Argentine basketball player (born 2002)

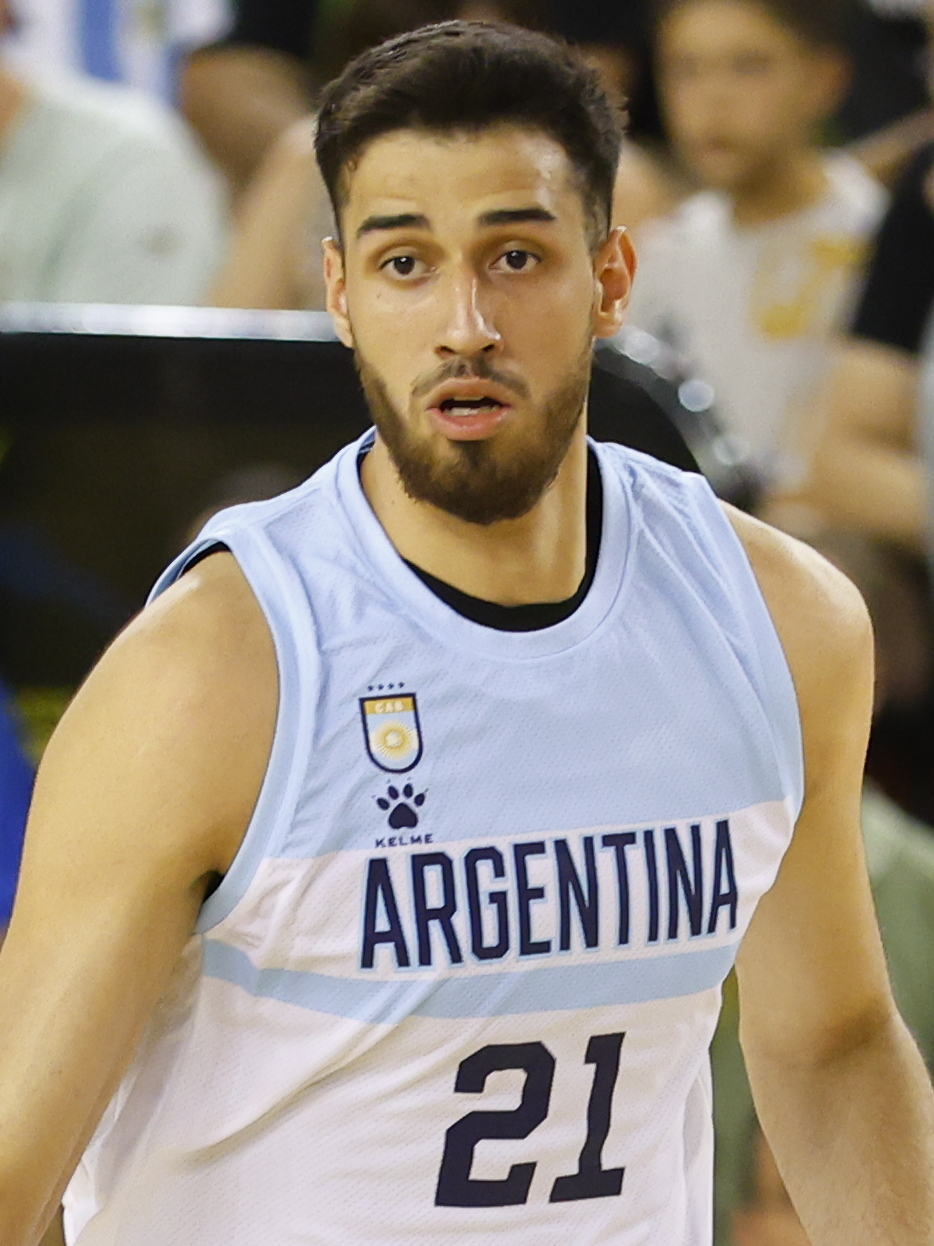
- Fernández with Argentina in 2023

No. 21 – South Carolina Gamecocks
- Position: Center
- League: Southeastern Conference

Personal information
- Born: November 21, 2002 (age 23) Santa Fe, Argentina
- Listed height: 2.11 m (6 ft 11 in)
- Listed weight: 100 kg (220 lb)

Career information
- College: South Carolina (2026–present)
- NBA draft: 2025: undrafted
- Playing career: 2020–present

Career history
- 2020–2023: Fuenlabrada
- 2020–2022: →Fuenlabrada B
- 2023–2024: Río Breogán
- 2024–2026: Bàsquet Girona

Career highlights
- ACB All-Young Team (2024)
Medals
Men's basketball
Representing Argentina
FIBA AmeriCup
Silver medal – second place	2025 Managua

Juan Francisco Fernández Ríos (born November 21, 2002) is an Argentine college basketball player for the South Carolina Gamecocks of the Southeastern Conference.

He has also represented the Argentine national team. Standing at 6 ft 11 inches (2.11 m), Fernández plays as a center. He also has Spanish citizenship.

== Early life and youth career ==
Born in Santa Fe, Argentina, Fernández joined the youth ranks of Unión de Santa Fe's basketball section at age 13. He also made his first appearances for the youth teams of the Argentine Basketball Confederation during this period. Fernández would later move to Spain to join the youth teams of Baloncesto Fuenlabrada at age 15.

== Professional career ==
=== Fuenlabrada (2020–2023) ===
After climbing through the ranks of Fuenlabrada's youth system, Fernández joined the reserve team Fuenlabrada B, then playing in the Liga EBA. He made his debut for the Fuenlabrada first team in November 2021, during the 2021–22 ACB season. Fernández moved between both teams until fully joining the first team roster for the 2022–23 ACB season.

=== Río Breogán (2023–2024) ===
In July 2023, Fernández signed with Río Breogán of the Liga ACB. With Breogán, Fernández was selected to the Best All-Young Team of the 2023–24 ACB season.

=== Bàsquet Girona (2024–2026) ===
In June 2024, Fernández signed with Bàsquet Girona of the Liga ACB. In January 2025, he was selected Player of the Round for the 16th round of the 2024–25 ACB season. On July 1, 2025, Girona announced Fernández would remain at the club for the 2025–26 season. On August 5, 2026, Girona announced it was parting ways with Fernández.

== National team career ==
Fernández has represented Argentina's youth ranks in several international tournaments, such as the 2018 U17 World Cup with the U17 Team and the 2019 U19 World Cup with the U19 Team.

He made his debut for the senior Argentine national team against Paraguay in November 2021, during the 2023 World Cup qualifiers. He was selected as part of Argentina's roster in the 2025 FIBA AmeriCup, in which they were runners-up. Fernández was selected to the All-Tournament Team.

== Career statistics ==
Legend
GP	Games played	GS	Games started	MPG	Minutes per game
FG%	Field-goal percentage	3P%	3-point field-goal percentage	FT%	Free-throw percentage
RPG	Rebounds per game	APG	Assists per game	SPG	Steals per game
BPG	Blocks per game	PPG	Points per game	PIR	Performance index rating
**Bold**	Career high

=== Domestic leagues ===
Year	Team	League	GP	MPG	FG%	3P%	FT%	RPG	APG	SPG	BPG	PPG
2023–24	(Spain) Breogán	ACB	34	19.1	.515	.298	.617	4.1	.9	.5	.7	8.5
2024–25	(Spain) Girona	ACB	28	19.1	.554	.059	.615	4.7	1.0	.6	.5	9.4
