= Javonte Smart =

American basketball player (born 1999)

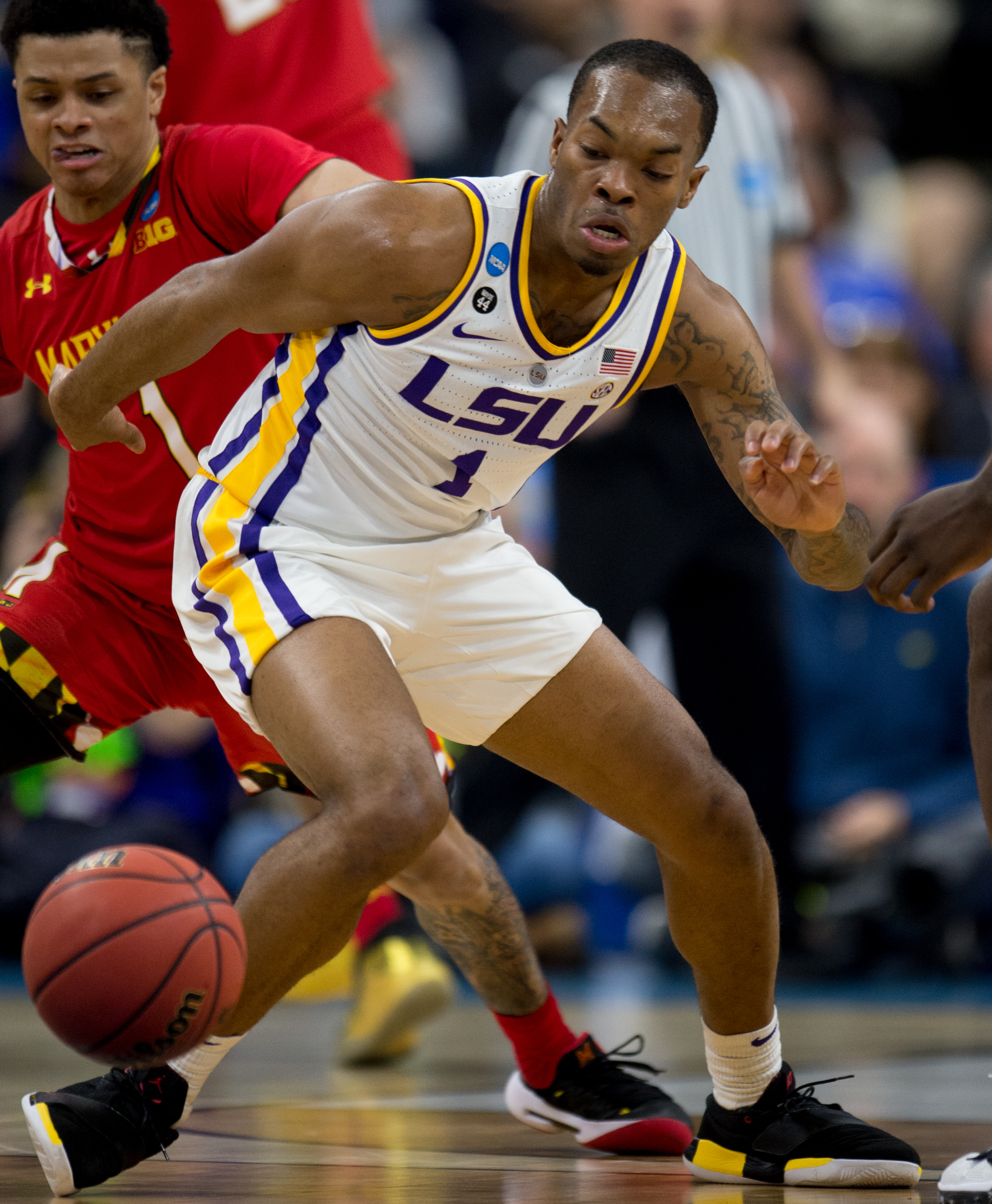
- Smart with LSU in 2019

No. 1 – U-BT Cluj-Napoca
- Position: Shooting guard
- League: Liga Națională; ABA League; EuroCup

Personal information
- Born: June 3, 1999 (age 27) Baton Rouge, Louisiana, U.S.
- Listed height: 6 ft 4 in (1.93 m)
- Listed weight: 205 lb (93 kg)

Career information
- High school: Scotlandville Magnet (Baton Rouge, Louisiana)
- College: LSU (2018–2021)
- NBA draft: 2021: undrafted
- Playing career: 2021–present

Career history
- 2021: Sioux Falls Skyforce
- 2021–2022: Milwaukee Bucks
- 2021–2022: →Wisconsin Herd
- 2022: Sioux Falls Skyforce
- 2022: Miami Heat
- 2022: →Sioux Falls Skyforce
- 2022–2023: Birmingham Squadron
- 2023: Philadelphia 76ers
- 2023: →Delaware Blue Coats
- 2023–2024: Delaware Blue Coats
- 2024: Crvena zvezda
- 2024–2026: Osceola Magic
- 2025–2026: Ottawa BlackJacks
- 2026–present: U-BT Cluj-Napoca

Career highlights
- ABA League champion (2024); CEBL scoring champion (2025); Second-team All-SEC – Coaches (2021); 3× Louisiana Mr. Basketball (2016–2018)
- Stats at NBA.com
- Stats at Basketball Reference
Medals
Men's basketball
Representing the United States
FIBA AmeriCup
Bronze medal – third place	2025 Managua
FIBA U17 World Cup
Gold medal – first place	2016 Spain	National team

Javonte Dedrick Smart (born June 3, 1999) is an American professional basketball player for U-BT Cluj-Napoca of the Romanian Liga Națională, the ABA League and the EuroCup. He played college basketball for the LSU Tigers.

== High school career ==
Smart attended Scotlandville Magnet High School in Baton Rouge, Louisiana and led the school to a state title as a freshman, earning MVP honors. As a sophomore, he averaged 22.4 points, 7.2 assists, and 6.9 rebounds per game. He participated in the Under Armour Elite 24 Showcase in August 2016. As a junior, Smart averaged 25.1 points, 8.7 rebounds, 6.4 assists and 2.1 steals per game. He was named Gatorade Louisiana Player of the Year for the second consecutive season and led Scotlandville to a state title in 2017. As a senior, Smart averaged 32.9 points, 10.6 rebounds, and 6.1 assists per game, sometimes playing the center position. He led the team to a state title and was again named Player of the Year. He is the only player to have been the Louisiana Mr. Basketball three times (2016-2018). Smart was considered a five-star recruit and was ranked 21st in his class according to 247Sports. Smart committed to LSU over offers from Kentucky and UCLA.

== College career ==
On February 23, 2019, Smart scored a career-high 29 points and hit two free throws with 0.6 seconds remaining in an 82–80 win against Tennessee. Smart missed one game during his freshman season, the regular season finale against Vanderbilt on March 7, after a report surfaced alleging coach Will Wade paid him during his recruitment. He returned for the SEC and NCAA tournaments after officials found no wrongdoing on Smart's part. As a freshman, Smart averaged 11.1 points, 3.3 rebounds, and 2.4 assists per game. After the season, he declared for the 2019 NBA draft but ultimately decided to return to LSU. As a sophomore, Smart averaged 12.5 points, 4.2 assists, 3.5 rebounds and 1.1 steals per game. Following the season Smart declared for the 2020 NBA draft but maintained his eligibility. Smart announced on August 3 that he was withdrawing from the draft and returning to LSU. As a junior, Smart averaged 16 points, 3.7 rebounds, four assists and 1.3 steals per game, earning Second Team All-SEC honors. He declared for the 2021 NBA draft and hired an agent.

== Professional career ==
=== Sioux Falls Skyforce / Milwaukee Bucks / Wisconsin Herd (2021–2022) ===
After going undrafted in the 2021 NBA draft, Smart joined the Miami Heat for the 2021 NBA Summer League and on September 10, he signed a contract with the Heat. He was waived prior to the start of the season and joined the Sioux Falls Skyforce as an affiliate player.

On November 30, 2021, Smart signed a two-way contract with the Milwaukee Bucks. Under the terms of the deal, he split time between the Bucks and their NBA G League affiliate, the Wisconsin Herd. However, he was waived on January 13, 2022.

=== Miami Heat / Return to Sioux Falls (2022) ===
On January 16, 2022, the Sioux Falls Skyforce reacquired Smart.

On February 15, 2022, Smart signed a two-way contract with the Miami Heat. The same day, he scored 40 points in a win against the Rio Grande Valley Vipers. On July 16, Smart was waived by the Heat.

=== Birmingham Squadron (2022–2023) ===
On November 4, 2022, Smart was named to the opening night roster for the Birmingham Squadron.

=== Philadelphia 76ers / Deleware Blue Coats (2023–2024) ===
In July 2023, Smart joined the Philadelphia 76ers for the 2023 NBA Summer League and on August 13, he signed with them. On October 21, the 76ers converted Smart to a two-way contract, but waived him on December 23. Four days later, he joined the Delaware Blue Coats.

=== Crvena zvezda Meridianbet (2024) ===
On January 14, 2024, Smart signed with Serbian powerhouse Crvena zvezda Meridianbet.

=== Osceola Magic (2024–2025) ===
On September 20, 2024, Smart signed with the Orlando Magic, but was waived on October 12. On October 27, he joined the Osceola Magic.

On October 13, 2025, Smart signed a training camp contract with Orlando. He was waived by the team prior to the start of the regular season on October 18.

== National team career ==
Smart has represented the United States in FIBA play on two occasions. In 2015, he was a member of the gold medal-winning U.S. team in the 2015 FIBA Americas Under-16 Championship and averaged 6.8 points, 4.2 rebounds, 1.4 assists, and 1.9 steals per game. Smart then won a gold medal at the 2016 FIBA Under-17 World Championship in Zaragoza, Spain. In the U17 tournament, Smart averaged 5.4 points, 3.4 assists and 3 rebounds per game.

== Career statistics ==
Legend
GP	Games played	GS	Games started	MPG	Minutes per game
FG%	Field-goal percentage	3P%	3-point field-goal percentage	FT%	Free-throw percentage
RPG	Rebounds per game	APG	Assists per game	SPG	Steals per game
BPG	Blocks per game	PPG	Points per game	PIR	Performance index rating
**Bold**	Career high

=== NBA ===
Year	Team	GP	GS	MPG	FG%	3P%	FT%	RPG	APG	SPG	BPG	PPG
2021–22	Milwaukee	**13**	**1**	**12.3**	.256	.222	.833	**1.5**	**1.1**	.3	.2	2.4
2021–22	Miami	4	0	10.0	**.471**	**.444**	—	1.3	.5	**.5**	**.3**	**5.0**
2023–24	Philadelphia	1	0	.7	—	—	—	—	—	—	—	0.0
Career		18	1	11.8	.317	.296	.833	1.3	.9	.3	.2	2.8

=== EuroLeague ===
Year	Team	GP	GS	MPG	FG%	3P%	FT%	RPG	APG	SPG	BPG	PPG	PIR
2023–24	Crvena zvezda Meridianbet	12	3	17.5	.365	.174	1.000	2.0	1.3	.3	.2	7.2	4.8
Career		12	3	17.5	.365	.174	1.000	2.0	1.3	.3	.2	7.2	4.8

=== Domestic leagues ===
Year	Team	League	GP	MPG	FG%	3P%	FT%	RPG	APG	SPG	BPG	PPG
2021–22	(United States) Sioux Falls Skyforce	G League	25	36.8	.419	.320	.754	4.6	3.6	1.9	.3	21.1
2022–23	(United States) B'ham Squadron	G League	32	29.1	.427	.360	.939	2.8	3.1	.9	—	13.6
2023–24	(United States) Delaware Blue Coats	G League	6	34.2	.500	.333	.818	2.5	4.7	.7	.3	18.5
2023–24	(Serbia) Crvena zvezda Meridianbet	ABA	10	20.5	.488	.347	.600	2.5	1.3	.5	—	11.0

=== College ===
Year	Team	GP	GS	MPG	FG%	3P%	FT%	RPG	APG	SPG	BPG	PPG
2018–19	LSU	**34**	18	29.9	.368	.311	.839	3.3	2.4	**1.3**	.1	11.1
2019–20	LSU	31	**30**	34.2	.415	.326	.814	3.5	**4.2**	1.1	**.2**	12.5
2020–21	LSU	28	28	**35.6**	**.460**	**.402**	**.857**	**3.7**	4.0	**1.3**	.1	**16.0**
Career		93	76	33.1	.414	.351	.836	3.5	3.4	1.2	.1	13.0

== Personal life ==
Smart is the son of Melinda Smart and Jerry Matthews. He has an older sister, Desiree, and a younger brother, Davyion. His cousin, Keith Smart has played and coached in the NBA.
