= 1988 Tournament of the Americas =

Tournament details
- Host country: Uruguay
- Dates: 22–31 May
- Teams: 7
- Venue: 1 (in 1 host city)

Final positions
- Champions: Brazil (2nd title)
- Runners-up: Puerto Rico
- Third place: Canada
- Fourth place: Uruguay

Tournament statistics
- Top scorer: (Brazil) Oscar Schmidt

The 1988 Tournament of the Americas, later known as the FIBA Americas Championship and the FIBA AmeriCup, was a basketball championship hosted by Uruguay from 22 to 31 May 1988. The games were played in Montevideo. This FIBA AmeriCup was to earn the three berths allocated to the Americas for the 1988 Summer Olympics in Seoul. The United States did not participate in the tournament, as the team had already been awarded a berth in the Olympics. Brazil defeated Puerto Rico in the final to win the tournament. Canada beat Uruguay in the third place game to claim the final Olympic berth.

== Qualification ==
Eight teams qualified during the qualification tournaments held in their respective zones in 1987; Canada qualified automatically since they are one of only two members of the North America zone. Panama and the Dominican Republic withdrew from the tournament. The teams formed a single group of seven teams.

- North America: Canada
- Caribbean and Central America:~~Dominican Republic~~, Mexico, ~~Panama~~, Puerto Rico
- South America: Argentina, Brazil, Uruguay, Venezuela

== Format ==
- The top four teams from the main group advance to the semifinals.
- The winners in the knockout semifinals advanced to the Final and were granted berths in the 1988 Summer Olympics tournament in Seoul. The losers figure in a third-place playoff where the winner was given the third and final place in the Olympics.

== Preliminary round ==
Qualified for the semifinals

Team	Pld	W	L	PF	PA	PD	Pts
Brazil	6	5	1	591	559	+32	11
Puerto Rico	6	5	1	493	456	+37	11
Canada	6	3	3	507	506	+1	9
Uruguay	6	3	3	533	487	+46	9
Argentina	6	3	3	533	567	−34	9
Mexico	6	2	4	546	549	−3	8
Venezuela	6	0	6	471	570	−99	6

22 May

Puerto Rico	80–63	Canada

Montevideo

22 May

Brazil	113–93	Argentina

Montevideo

22 May

Uruguay	100–67	Venezuela

Montevideo

23 May

Puerto Rico	94–81	Argentina

Montevideo

23 May

Uruguay	98–84	Mexico

Montevideo

23 May

Canada	94–88	Venezuela

Montevideo

24 May

Brazil	98–92	Puerto Rico

Montevideo

24 May

Canada	84–81	Mexico

Montevideo

24 May

Argentina	110–77	Venezuela

Montevideo

25 May

Uruguay	79–68	Canada

Montevideo

25 May

Argentina	91–89	Mexico

Montevideo

25 May

Brazil	91–83	Venezuela

Montevideo

26 May

Puerto Rico	65–63	Venezuela

Montevideo

26 May

Mexico	111–103	Brazil

Montevideo

26 May

Argentina	90–82	Uruguay

Montevideo

27 May

Puerto Rico	80–71	Mexico

Montevideo

27 May

Brazil	96–94	Uruguay

Montevideo

27 May

Canada	112–88	Argentina

Montevideo

28 May

Puerto Rico	82–80	Uruguay

Montevideo

28 May

Brazil	90–86	Canada

Montevideo

28 May

Mexico	110–93	Venezuela

Montevideo

== Knockout stage ==
Semi-finals
30 May
Puerto Rico	62
Canada	60
30 May
Brazil	90
Uruguay	83

Final
31 May
Brazil	101
Puerto Rico	92
Third place
31 May
Canada	87
Uruguay	80

== Final ==
Brazil beat Puerto Rico 101–92 with Oscar Schmidt scoring 20 points.

== Awards ==
=== Topscorer ===
Oscar Schmidt was the top scorer with 240 points (30.0 average).

1988 Tournament of the Americas winners

Brazil
Second title

== Final standings ==
Qualified for the 1988 Olympic Tournament

Rank	Team	Record
1st place, gold medalist(s)	Brazil	7–1
2nd place, silver medalist(s)	Puerto Rico	6–2
3rd place, bronze medalist(s)	Canada	4–4
4	Uruguay	3–5
5	Argentina	3–3
6	Mexico	2–4
7	Venezuela	0–6
