= 1980 Tournament of the Americas =

Tournament details
- Host country: Puerto Rico
- Dates: April 18–25, 1980
- Teams: 7
- Venue(s): 1 (in 1 host city)

Final positions
- Champions: Puerto Rico (1st title)
- Runners-up: Canada
- Third place: Argentina
- Fourth place: Brazil

Tournament statistics
- Top scorer: (Mexico) Arturo Guerrero

The 1980 Tournament of the Americas, since 2005 called the FIBA Americas Championship or the FIBA AmeriCup, was the inaugural edition of this basketball tournament, and it was hosted by Puerto Rico in San Juan from April 18 to April 25, 1980. The berths allocated to the Americas for the 1980 Summer Olympics in Moscow were determined. The United States did not participate in the tournament. Puerto Rico won the tournament by going 5–1 in the round robin. Because of the U.S.-led boycott of the 1980 Summer Olympic Games, eventual berths went to Brazil, the fourth-place finisher, and Cuba, the sixth-place finisher.

== Competing nations ==
The following national teams competed:

Argentina
Brazil
Canada
Cuba
Mexico
Puerto Rico
Uruguay

== Preliminary rounds ==
=== Standings ===
Team	Pts	Pld	W	L	PF	PA	Diff
Puerto Rico*	11	6	5	1	651	535	+116
Canada*	11	6	5	1	544	476	+68
Argentina*	10	6	4	2	584	526	+58
Brazil*	10	6	4	2	543	557	–14
Mexico	8	6	2	4	538	589	–51
Cuba	7	6	1	5	486	523	–37
Uruguay	6	6	0	6	492	632	–140

- Puerto Rico wins gold medal based on head-to-head victory over Canada. Argentina wins bronze medal based on head-to-head victory over Brazil.

April 18, 1980

Brazil	95–82	Uruguay
Canada	77–74	Cuba
Puerto Rico	99–93	Argentina

April 19, 1980

Canada	102–79	Mexico
Brazil	78–76	Cuba
Puerto Rico	128–84	Uruguay

April 20, 1980

Canada	111–72	Uruguay
Argentina	104–79	Mexico
Puerto Rico	113–88	Cuba

April 21, 1980

Brazil	92–90	Mexico
Canada	89–86	Argentina
Cuba	103–81	Uruguay

April 23, 1980

Canada	98–81	Brazil
Argentina	97–86	Uruguay
Puerto Rico	134–104	Mexico

April 24, 1980

Argentina	118–98	Brazil
Puerto Rico	84–67	Canada
Mexico	88–70	Cuba

April 25, 1980

Mexico	98–87	Uruguay
Argentina	86–75	Cuba
Brazil	99–93	Puerto Rico

== Awards ==
=== Topscorer ===
Arturo Guerrero was the topscorer with 147 pts (24.5 per game).

1980 Tournament of the Americas winners

Puerto Rico
First title
