= 1984 Tournament of the Americas =

Tournament details
- Host country: Brazil
- Dates: 15–24 May
- Teams: 9
- Venue: 1 (in 1 host city)

Final positions
- Champions: Brazil (1st title)
- Runners-up: Uruguay
- Third place: Canada
- Fourth place: Panama

Tournament statistics
- Top scorer: (Brazil) Oscar Schmidt

The 1984 Tournament of the Americas, since 2005 called the FIBA Americas Championship or FIBA AmeriCup, was the 2nd edition of this basketball tournament, hosted in São Paulo, Brazil from 15 to 24 May 1984. The outcome would determine the three berths allocated to the Americas for the 1984 Los Angeles Summer Olympics and five berths for the 1986 FIBA World Championship in Spain. The United States did not participate in the tournament, claiming host-courtesy. Brazil was undefeated in the round robin tournament and were accompanied to the Olympic games by Canada and Uruguay.

== Qualification ==
Eight teams promoted from the respective zone tournaments in 1982 and 1983 to the 1984 tournament; Canada qualified automatically since they are one of only two members of the North America zone. Venezuela withdrew from the tournament. The teams formed a single group of nine teams.

- North America: Canada
- Caribbean and Central America:Cuba, Dominican Republic, Mexico, Panama, Puerto Rico
- South America: Argentina, Brazil, Uruguay, ~~Venezuela~~

== Format ==
- The top three teams from the main group earned berths in the 1984 Los Angeles Summer Olympic games and for the 1986 FIBA World Championship to be held in Spain. The fourth and fifth teams in the main group also earned berths to the 1986 FIBA World Championship.

== Preliminary round ==
Qualified for the 1984 Olympic Tournament and the 1986 FIBA World Championship
Qualified for the 1986 FIBA World Championship

Team	Pld	W	L	PF	PA	PD	Pts
Brazil	8	8	0	778	710	+68	16
Uruguay	8	6	2	749	766	−17	14
Canada	8	6	2	759	646	+113	14
Panama	8	5	3	776	741	+35	13
Mexico	8	3	5	724	780	−56	11
Puerto Rico	8	3	5	753	774	−21	11
Argentina	8	2	6	740	769	−29	10
Cuba	8	2	6	736	752	−16	10
Dominican Republic	8	1	7	737	814	−77	9

15 May

Canada	101–72	Mexico

São Paulo

15 May

Cuba	100–92	Dominican Republic

São Paulo

15 May

Panama	88–77	Argentina

São Paulo

15 May

Brazil	93–76	Uruguay

São Paulo

16 May

Canada	85–75	Cuba

São Paulo

16 May

Mexico	93–87	Puerto Rico

São Paulo

16 May

Dominican Republic	88–83	Argentina

São Paulo

16 May

Brazil	95–92	Panama

São Paulo

17 May

Canada	110–82	Dominican Republic

São Paulo

17 May

Uruguay	109–95	Mexico

São Paulo

17 May

Brazil	107–95	Argentina

São Paulo

17 May

Puerto Rico	97–86	Cuba

São Paulo

18 May

Uruguay	95–88	Cuba

São Paulo

18 May

Canada	85–73	Argentina

São Paulo

18 May

Panama	95–87	Mexico

São Paulo

18 May

Puerto Rico	107–98	Dominican Republic

São Paulo

19 May

Brazil	90–80	Mexico

São Paulo

19 May

Cuba	103–82	Panama

São Paulo

19 May

Uruguay	110–106	Dominican Republic

São Paulo

19 May

Canada	89–75	Puerto Rico

São Paulo

21 May

Puerto Rico	93–92	Argentina

São Paulo

21 May

Uruguay	91–89	Canada

São Paulo

21 May

Panama	115–98	Dominican Republic

São Paulo

21 May

Brazil	92–89	Cuba

São Paulo

22 May

Argentina	113–98	Mexico

São Paulo

22 May

Uruguay	92–84	Puerto Rico

São Paulo

22 May

Canada	107–79	Panama

São Paulo

22 May

Brazil	93–78	Dominican Republic

São Paulo

23 May

Uruguay	105–101	Argentina

São Paulo

23 May

Mexico	103–90	Cuba

São Paulo

23 May

Panama	115–103	Puerto Rico

São Paulo

23 May

Brazil	99–93	Canada

São Paulo

24 May

Mexico	96–95	Dominican Republic

São Paulo

24 May

Panama	110–71	Uruguay

São Paulo

24 May

Argentina	106–105	Cuba

São Paulo

24 May

Brazil	109–107	Puerto Rico

São Paulo

== Final ==
Brazil beat Puerto Rico in a dramatic game with Oscar Schmidt the top scorer with 27 points.

== Awards ==
=== Topscorer ===
Oscar Schmidt was the top scorer with 209 points (26.1 average).

1984Tournament of the Americas winners

Brazil
First title
