= Uruguay men's national basketball team =

Uruguay
- FIBA ranking: 43 ▼1 (1 September 2026)
- Joined FIBA: 1936; 90 years ago
- FIBA zone: FIBA Americas
- National federation: Uruguayan Basketball Federation
- Coach: Gerardo Jauri
- Nickname: Charrúas

Olympic Games
- Appearances: 7
- Medals: (bronze) Bronze: (1952, 1956)

FIBA World Cup
- Appearances: 7

FIBA AmeriCup
- Appearances: 19
- Medals: (silver) Silver: (1984)
Home	Away

The Uruguay national basketball team (Spanish: Selección de baloncesto de Uruguay) represents Uruguay in men's international basketball competitions and it is governed by Federación Uruguaya de basketball.

The team has made seven appearances in the FIBA World Cup and the team represents FIBA and FIBA Americas.

Uruguay is one of three South American countries to win medals at the Basketball Tournament of the Summer Olympics. It won the bronze medal in both the 1952 and 1956 Summer Olympics.

In addition, it is the third most successful team in the South American Basketball Championship, with 11 titles.

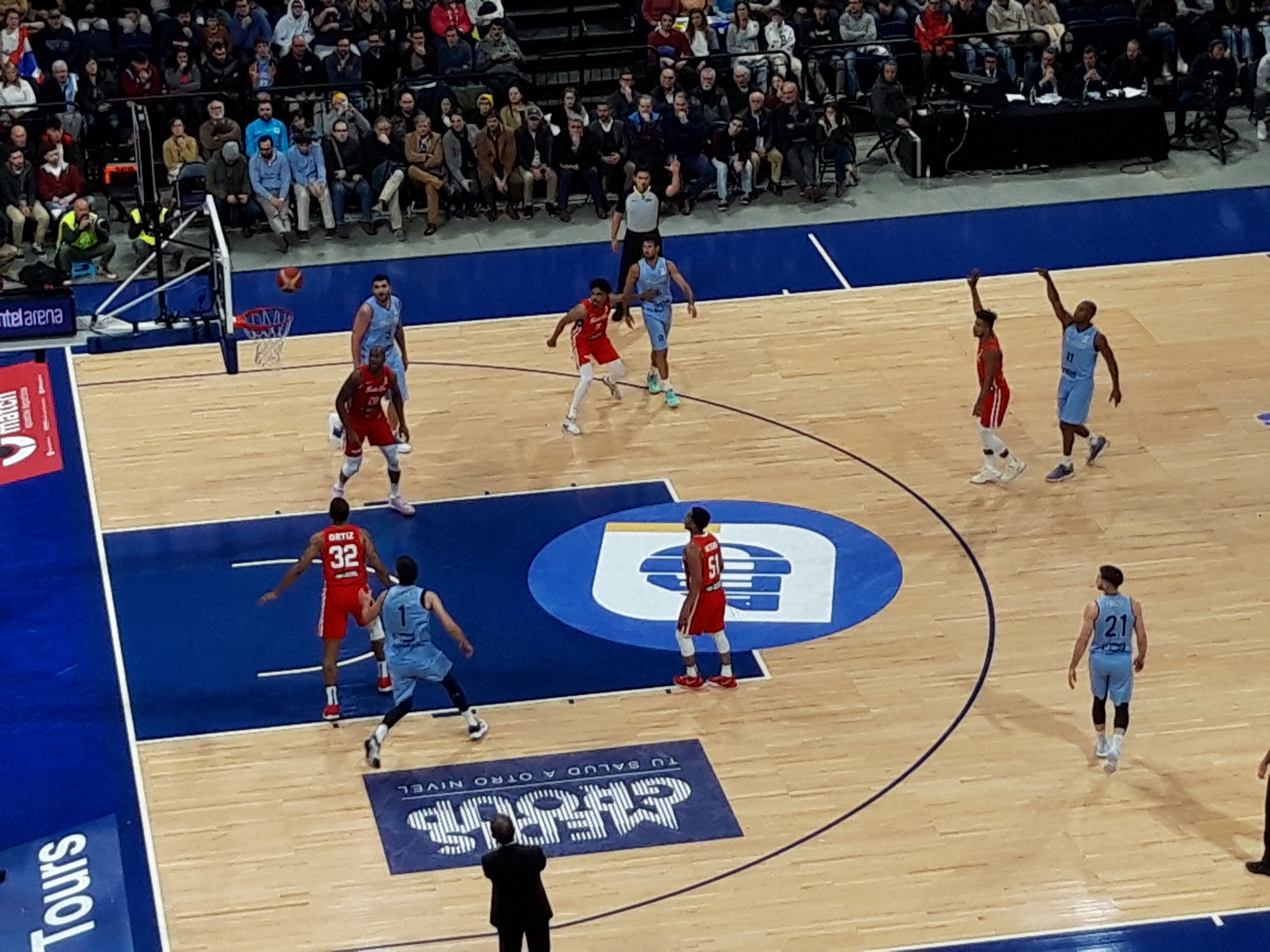
2023 FIBA World Cup match against Puerto Rico

== Honours ==
- Olympic Games
  - Bronze (2): 1952, 1956
- FIBA AmeriCup
  - Silver (1): 1984
- Pan American Games
  - Bronze (1): 2007
- South American Championship
  - Gold (11): 1930, 1932, 1940, 1947, 1949, 1953, 1955, 1969, 1981, 1995, 1997
  - Silver (13): 1937, 1939, 1942, 1943, 1945, 1958, 1961, 1968, 1971, 1977, 1985, 2006, 2008
  - Bronze (13): 1935, 1938, 1941, 1963, 1976, 1979, 1983, 1989, 1993, 2003, 2010, 2012, 2016

== Competitive record ==
=== Olympic Games ===
Champions Runners-up Third place Fourth place Tournament played fully or partially on home soil

Olympic Games record									Qualification record					
Year	Round	Position	Pld	W	L	PF	PA	Squad	Pos	Pld	W	L	PF	PA
(Germany) 1936	Quarter-finals	6th	6	3	3	142	146	Squad						
(United Kingdom) 1948	Quarter-finals	5th	8	5	3	369	301	Squad						
(Finland) 1952	Bronze medalists	3rd	8	5	3	486	471	Squad	Qualified as top six in 1948 Olympics					
(Australia) 1956	Bronze medalists	3rd	8	6	2	568	559	Squad	Direct qualification					
(Italy) 1960	Semi-finals	8th	8	2	6	548	678	Squad	Direct qualification					
(Japan) 1964	Preliminary round	8th	9	4	5	596	642	Squad	Qualified as top eight in 1960 Olympics					
(Mexico) 1968	Did not qualify								3rd	4	3	1	302	285
(West Germany) 1972	Did not qualify								Did not participate					
(Canada) 1976	Did not qualify								Did not participate					
(Soviet Union) 1980	Did not qualify								Tournament of the Americas served as qualifiers					
(United States) 1984	Quarter-finals	6th	8	3	5	688	776	Squad	Tournament of the Americas served as qualifiers					
(South Korea) 1988	Did not qualify								Tournament of the Americas served as qualifiers					
(Spain) 1992	Did not qualify								Tournament of the Americas served as qualifiers					
(United States) 1996	Did not qualify								Tournament of the Americas served as qualifiers					
(Australia) 2000	Did not qualify								Tournament of the Americas served as qualifiers					
(Greece) 2004	Did not qualify								Tournament of the Americas served as qualifiers					
(China) 2008	Did not qualify								Did not qualify					
(United Kingdom) 2012	Did not qualify								Did not qualify					
(Brazil) 2016	Did not qualify								Did not qualify					
(Japan) 2020	Did not qualify								5th	2	0	2	165	175
(France) 2024	Did not qualify								4th	4	1	3	277	290
Total	2 Bronzes	7/21	55	28	27	3397	3573	—	—	10	4	6	744	750

=== FIBA World Cup ===
FIBA Basketball World Cup record									Qualification record					
Year	Round	Position	Pld	W	L	PF	PA	Squad	Pos	Pld	W	L	PF	PA
(Argentina) 1950	Qualified but later withdrew								South American Championship served as qualifiers					
(Brazil) 1954	Final round	6th	9	4	5	535	544	Squad	South American Championship served as qualifiers					
(Chile) 1959	Preliminary round	9th	6	2	4	356	384		South American Championship served as qualifiers					
(Brazil) 1963	Preliminary round	10th	8	4	4	571	586		South American Championship served as qualifiers					
(Uruguay) 1967	Final round	7th	6	1	5	347	419		Qualified as host					
(Socialist Federal Republic of Yugoslavia) 1970	Final round	7th	9	2	7	564	692		South American Championship served as qualifiers					
(Puerto Rico) 1974	Did not qualify								South American Championship served as qualifiers					
(Philippines) 1978	Did not qualify								South American Championship served as qualifiers					
(Colombia) 1982	Preliminary round	11th	7	2	5	559	628		South American Championship served as qualifiers					
(Spain) 1986	Preliminary round	18th	5	2	3	377	437	Squad	South American Championship served as qualifiers					
(Argentina) 1990	Did not qualify								Tournament of the Americas served as qualifiers					
(Canada) 1994	Did not qualify								Tournament of the Americas served as qualifiers					
(Greece) 1998	Did not qualify								Tournament of the Americas served as qualifiers					
(United States) 2002	Did not qualify								Tournament of the Americas served as qualifiers					
(Japan) 2006	Did not qualify								FIBA Americas Championship served as qualifiers					
(Turkey) 2010	Did not qualify								FIBA Americas Championship served as qualifiers					
(Spain) 2014	Did not qualify								FIBA Americas Championship served as qualifiers					
(China) 2019	Did not qualify								4th	12	6	6	824	909
(Philippines) (Japan) (Indonesia) 2023	Did not qualify								5th	12	5	7	867	935
(Qatar) 2027	Qualification in progress								2nd	8	6	2	675	587
(France) 2031	To be determined								To be determined					
Total	—	7/20	50	17	33	3309	3690	—	—	32	17	15	2366	2431

=== FIBA AmeriCup ===
FIBA AmeriCup record									Qualification record					
Year	Round	Position	Pld	W	L	PF	PA	Squad	Pos	Pld	W	L	PF	PA
(Puerto Rico) 1980	Round robin	7th	6	0	6	492	632	Squad	South American Championship served as qualifiers					
(Brazil) 1984	Runners-up	2nd	8	6	2	749	766	Squad	South American Championship served as qualifiers					
(Uruguay) 1988	Fourth place	4th	8	3	5	696	664	Squad	Qualified as host					
(Mexico) 1989	Qualified but later withdrew								South American Championship served as qualifiers					
(United States) 1992	Preliminary round	10th	4	0	4	367	451	Squad	South American Championship served as qualifiers					
(Puerto Rico) 1993	Preliminary round	10th	4	0	4	314	414	Squad	South American Championship served as qualifiers					
(Argentina) 1995	Quarterfinal group	6th	8	4	4	676	686	Squad	South American Championship served as qualifiers					
(Uruguay) 1997	Quarterfinal group	8th	8	3	5	602	648	Squad	Qualified as host					
(Puerto Rico) 1999	Quarterfinal group	7th	8	2	6	602	730	Squad	South American Championship served as qualifiers					
(Argentina) 2001	Quarterfinal group	8th	8	1	7	627	782	Squad	South American Championship served as qualifiers					
(Puerto Rico) 2003	Preliminary round	9th	4	0	4	290	352	Squad	South American Championship served as qualifiers					
(Dominican Republic) 2005	Quarterfinal group	8th	8	1	7	628	672	Squad	South American Championship served as qualifiers					
(United States) 2007	Quarterfinal group	6th	8	3	5	638	732	Squad	South American Championship served as qualifiers					
(Puerto Rico) 2009	Quarterfinal group	6th	8	3	5	546	569	Squad	South American Championship served as qualifiers					
(Argentina) 2011	Quarterfinal group	7th	8	2	6	561	626	Squad	South American Championship served as qualifiers					
(Venezuela) 2013	Quarterfinal group	7th	8	2	6	561	657	Squad	South American Championship served as qualifiers					
(Mexico) 2015	Quarterfinal group	8th	8	2	6	590	657	Squad	South American Championship served as qualifiers					
(Argentina) (Colombia) (Uruguay) 2017	Preliminary round	6th	3	2	1	211	199	Squad	South American Championship served as qualifiers					
(Brazil) 2022	Preliminary round	10th	3	0	3	208	230	Squad	1st	6	3	3	478	471
(Nicaragua) 2025	Quarter-finals	7th	4	2	2	332	340	Squad	2nd	6	4	2	495	403
Total	1 silver	19/20	124	36	88	9690	10807	—	—	12	7	3	973	874

=== Pan American Games ===
Pan American Games record
Year	Round	Position	Pld	W	L	PF	PA	Squad
(Argentina) 1951	Did not participate							
(Mexico) 1955	Did not participate							
(United States) 1959	Did not participate							
(Brazil) 1963	Round robin	4th	6	2	4	371	402	
(Canada) 1967	Did not participate							
(Colombia) 1971	Did not participate							
(Mexico) 1975	Did not participate							
(Puerto Rico) 1979	Did not participate							
(Venezuela) 1983	Did not participate							
(United States) 1987	Quarter-finals	7th	7	2	5	546	621	
(Cuba) 1991	Quarter-finals	7th	6	1	5	494	597	
(Argentina) 1995	Fourth place	4th	7	2	5	613	628	
(Canada) 1999	Preliminary round	8th	4	0	4	282	329	Squad
(Dominican Republic) 2003	Preliminary round	8th	5	1	4	366	422	Squad
(Brazil) 2007	Bronze medalists	3rd	5	3	2	398	389	Squad
(Mexico) 2011	Preliminary round	8th	4	1	3	277	300	Squad
(Canada) 2015	Did not qualify							
(Peru) 2019	Preliminary round	6th	4	1	3	262	324	Squad
(Chile) 2023	Did not qualify							
Total	1 bronze	9/19	48	13	35	3609	4012	—

=== FIBA South American Championship ===
South American Basketball Championship record
Year	Round	Position	Pld	W	L	PF	PA	Squad
(Uruguay) 1930	Champions	1st	6	6	0	225	88	
(Chile) 1932	Champions	1st	5	4	1	125	99	
(Argentina) 1934	Fourth place	4th	6	2	4	72	71	
(Brazil) 1935	Third place	3rd	4	1	3	107	123	
(Chile) 1937	Runners-up	2nd	8	5	3	201	198	
(Peru) 1938	Third place	3rd	4	2	2	160	139	
(Brazil) 1939	Runners-up	2nd	4	3	1	151	122	
(Uruguay) 1940	Champions	1st	5	5	0	192	101	
(Argentina) 1941	Third place	3rd	5	3	2	206	151	
(Chile) 1942	Runners-up	2nd	5	3	2	196	173	
(Peru) 1943	Runners-up	2nd	8	6	2	325	199	
(Ecuador) 1945	Runners-up	2nd	5	4	1	231	181	
(Brazil) 1947	Champions	1st	5	5	0	225	183	
(Paraguay) 1949	Champions	1st	5	5	0	164	134	
(Uruguay) 1953	Champions	1st	6	6	0	309	200	
(Colombia) 1955	Champions	1st	8	7	1	463	389	
(Chile) 1958	Runners-up	2nd	7	6	1	445	398	
(Argentina) 1960	Fourth place	4th	6	3	3	478	388	
(Brazil) 1961	Runners-up	2nd	7	5	2	434	420	
(Peru) 1963	Third place	3rd	8	7	1	552	474	
(Argentina) 1966	Fourth place	4th	7	4	3	460	444	
(Paraguay) 1968	Runners-up	2nd	7	5	2	451	397	
(Uruguay) 1969	Champions	1st	6	6	0	433	322	
(Uruguay) 1971	Runners-up	1st	7	6	1	516	455	
(Colombia) 1973	Fourth place	4th	7	3	4	465	484	
(Colombia) 1976	Third place	3rd	6	4	2	452	456	
(Chile) 1977	Runners-up	2nd	8	6	2	650	572	
(Argentina) 1979	Third place	3rd	6	4	2	530	494	
(Uruguay) 1981	Champions	1st	5	5	0	431	352	
(Brazil) 1983	Third place	3rd	6	4	2	524	449	
(Colombia) 1985	Runners-up	2nd	7	6	1	690	506	
(Paraguay) 1987	Fourth place	4th	6	3	3	481	460	
(Ecuador) 1989	Third place	3rd	8	5	3	720	674	
(Venezuela) 1991	Fourth place	4th	7	4	3	634	571	
(Brazil) 1993	Fourth place	4th	7	3	4	621	595	
(Uruguay) 1995	Champions	1st	7	6	1	660	569	
(Venezuela) 1997	Champions	1st	7	5	2	646	500	
(Argentina) 1999	Fourth place	4th	6	3	3	542	480	
(Chile) 2001	Fourth place	4th	9	5	4	766	642	
(Uruguay) 2003	Third place	3rd	6	4	2	467	452	
(Brazil) 2004	Fourth place	4th	6	3	3	535	535	
(Venezuela) 2006	Runners-up	2nd	4	2	2	298	324	
(Chile) 2008	Runners-up	2nd	6	4	2	531	493	
(Colombia) 2010	Third place	3rd	5	3	2	353	363	
(Argentina) 2012	Third place	3rd	5	3	2	438	339	
(Venezuela) 2014	Fourth place	4th	5	2	3	387	309	
(Venezuela) 2016	Third place	3rd	6	4	2	450	399	Squad
Total	11 titles	47/47	289	200	89	19392	16867	—

== Results and fixtures ==
The following is a list of match results in the last 12 months, as well as any future matches that have been scheduled.

Win Loss Fixture

=== 2025 ===
27 November 2027 FIBA WCQ; First round	Panama	60–93	Uruguay	Panama City, Panama
20:40 UTC−5	Scoring by quarter: 12–28, 20–27, 15–21, 13–17
	Pts: Mitchell, Lindo 14; Rebs: Lindo 10; Asts: Jackson 4	Boxscore	Pts: Parodi 23; Rebs: Rodríguez 23; Asts: Rodríguez, Parodi 6	Arena: Roberto Durán Arena; Referees: Roberto Vázquez (PUR), Jayson Stiell (CAN), Claudio Osorio (CHI)

30 November 2027 FIBA WCQ; First round	Uruguay	84–82	Panama	Montevideo, Uruguay
21:40 UTC−3	Scoring by quarter: 21–19, 19–2, 21–23, 23–18
	Pts: Rodríguez 29; Rebs: Rodríguez 9 Asts: Parodi 7	Boxscore	Pts: Jackson 29; Rebs: Mitchell 12; Asts: Mitchell, Jackson 5	Arena: Antel Arena; Referees: Johnny Batista (PUR), Edwin Quiles (PUR), Nicolas Zivieri (BRA)

=== 2026 ===
27 February 2027 FIBA WCQ; First round	Argentina	44–61	Uruguay	Buenos Aires, Argentina
21:30 UTC−3	Scoring by quarter: 15–16, 7–14, 13–11, 9–20
	Pts: Corbalán 14; Rebs: Lugarini, Bressan 7 Asts: Bressan 3	Boxscore	Pts: Rodríguez 20; Rebs: Rojas 10; Asts: Rodríguez 6	Arena: Estadio Obras Sanitarias; Attendance: 1,950; Referees: Johnny Batista (PUR), Grant Todey (USA), Cooper Toppings (CAN)

2 March 2027 FIBA WCQ; First round	Cuba	62–88	Uruguay	Panama City, Panama
19:00 UTC−5	Scoring by quarter: 17–20, 19–17, 11–22, 15–29
	Pts: Bombino 14; Rebs: Bombino 9 Asts: Chacón 5	Boxscore	Pts: Serres 25; Rebs: Véscovi 11; Asts: Véscovi 8	Arena: Roberto Durán Arena; Referees: Roberto Vázquez (PUR), Waseem Husainy (CAN), Julirys Guzmán (PUR)

2 July 2027 FIBA WCQ; First round	Uruguay	76–91	Argentina	Montevideo, Uruguay
22:10 UTC−3	Scoring by quarter: 20–25, 24–16, 16–28, 16–22
	Pts: J. Rodríguez 19; Rebs: J. Rodríguez 9 Asts: J. Rodríguez 6	Boxscore	Pts: Bolmaro 22; Rebs: Cáffaro 11; Asts: Deck 5	Arena: Antel Arena; Referees: Roberto Vázquez (PUR), Jayson Stiell (CAN), Alexis Mercado (PUR)

5 July 2027 FIBA WCQ; First round	Uruguay	99–70	Cuba	Montevideo, Uruguay
18:40 UTC−3	Scoring by quarter: 30–14, 26–22, 21–16, 22–18
	Pts: Taboada 27; Rebs: Gómez 8 Asts: J. Rodríguez 11		Pts: Chacón 15; Rebs: Rodríguez 5 Asts: Chacón 4	Arena: Antel Arena; Attendance: 4,603; Referees: Matthew Myers (USA), Edwin Quiles (PUR), João Varella (BRA)

13 August Friendly	China	83–78	Uruguay	Foshan, China
19:30 UTC+8	Scoring by quarter: 29–24, 19–22, 15–11, 20–21
	Pts: He 17; Rebs: Hu J. 5 Asts: He, Liao 4		Pts: Pomoli 15; Rebs: Rojas 5 Asts: Vescovi 6	Arena: Shunde Sports Center; Referees: Li Jin (CHN), Gao Yuejie (CHN), Jianing Jun'an (CHN)

13 August Friendly	China	72–91	Uruguay	Foshan, China
19:30 UTC+8	Scoring by quarter: 18–16, 21–32, 14–22, 19–21
	Pts: Zhao J. 17; Rebs: Three players 7 Asts: Pang 4		Pts: Vescovi 21; Rebs: Vescovi 7 Asts: Vescovi 6	Arena: Shunde Sports Center; Referees: Sun Jian (CHN), Li Jin (CHN), Gao Xiaodong (CHN)

27 August 2027 FIBA WCQ; Second round	Uruguay	94–103	Bahamas	Montevideo, Uruguay
20:10 UTC−3	Scoring by quarter: 20–23, 28–31, 20–21, 26–28
	Pts: Rodríguez 30; Rebs: Taboada 7 Asts: Vescovi 8	Boxscore	Pts: Hield 28; Rebs: Burrows, Hield 7 Asts: Bridgewater 9	Arena: Antel Arena; Referees: Omar Bermúdez (MEX), Orlando Varela (HON), Roberto Fernández (CRC)

31 August 2027 FIBA WCQ; Second round	Uruguay	80–75	Puerto Rico	Montevideo, Uruguay
20:10 UTC−3	Scoring by quarter: 27–20, 16–17, 21–18, 16–20
	Pts: Fitipaldo 20; Rebs: Vescovi 7 Asts: Parodi, Fitipaldo 6	Boxscore	Pts: E. Thompson 29; Rebs: Piñeiro 7 Asts: Alvarado 9	Arena: Antel Arena; Attendance: 6,271; Referees: Daniel García (VEN), Krishna Domínguez (MEX), Fernando Leite (BRA)

26 November 2027 FIBA WCQ; Second round	Uruguay	vs.	Canada	Montevideo, Uruguay
19:10 UTC−3
		Boxscore		Arena: Antel Arena

29 November 2027 FIBA WCQ; Second round	Puerto Rico	vs.	Uruguay	Bayamón, Puerto Rico
21:10 UTC−4
		Boxscore		Arena: Coliseo Rubén Rodríguez

=== 2027 ===
26 February 2027 FIBA WCQ; Second round	Bahamas	vs.	Uruguay	Bahamas
		Boxscore

1 March 2027 FIBA WCQ; Second round	Canada	vs.	Uruguay	Canada
		Boxscore

== Team ==
=== Current roster ===
Roster for the FIBA World Cup qualification matches on 27 and 31 August 2026 against Bahamas and Puerto Rico

Uruguay men's national basketball team roster
Players
Coaches

Pos.	No.	Name	Age – Date of birth	Height	Club	Ctr.
G	6	Bruno Fitipaldo (C)	35 – 2 August 1991	1.84 m (6 ft 0 in)	La Laguna Tenerife	(Spain)
G	8	Nicola Pomoli	27 – 25 January 1999	1.98 m (6 ft 6 in)	Peñarol	(Uruguay)
F	10	Emiliano Serres	29 – 7 June 1997	2.04 m (6 ft 8 in)	Peñarol	(Uruguay)
SG	14	Joaquín Rodríguez	27 – 14 June 1999	1.94 m (6 ft 4 in)	Dreamland Gran Canaria	(Spain)
C	20	Pablo Gómez	23 – 24 January 2003	2.02 m (6 ft 8 in)	Nacional	(Uruguay)
PG	21	Luciano Parodi	32 – 16 February 1994	1.82 m (6 ft 0 in)	Sesi Franca	(Brazil)
G	25	Santiago Vescovi	24 – 14 September 2001	1.91 m (6 ft 3 in)	Peñarol	(Uruguay)
PF	30	Nicolás Martínez	22 – 28 October 2003	2.06 m (6 ft 9 in)	Quimsa	(Argentina)
PF	35	Gonzalo Iglesias	33 – 4 August 1993	2.03 m (6 ft 8 in)	Amics Castelló	(Spain)
PF	42	Martín Rojas	28 – 23 July 1998	1.93 m (6 ft 4 in)	Peñarol	(Uruguay)
PF	45	Mateo Bianchi	24 – 23 June 2002	2.05 m (6 ft 9 in)	Defensor Sporting	(Uruguay)
F	59	Joaquín Taboada	19 – 5 June 2007	1.91 m (6 ft 3 in)	San Pablo Burgos	(Spain)

Head coach

- (Uruguay) Gerardo Jauri

Assistant coach(es)

- (Uruguay) Nicolás Mazzarino
- (Uruguay) Gonzalo Brea
- (Uruguay) Joaquín Núñez

Legend

- (C) Team captain
- Age – describes age
  on 27 August 2026

=== Depth chart ===
Pos.	Starting 5	Bench 1	Bench 2
C	Pablo Gómez	Mateo Bianchi
PF	Gonzalo Iglesias	Martín Rojas
SF	Joaquín Taboada	Emiliano Serres
SG	Joaquín Rodriguez	Santiago Vescovi	Nicola Pomoli
PG	Bruno Fitipaldo	Luciano Parodi

=== Recent call-ups ===
Uruguay men's national basketball team in the past twelve months roster
Players
Coaches

Pos.	No.	Name	Age – Date of birth	Height	Club	Ctr.
PF	00	Theo Metzger (v (The Bahamas) †)	27 – 6 February 1999	2.00 m (6 ft 7 in)	Biguá	(Uruguay)
PF	5	Juan Ignacio Ducasse (v (The Bahamas) †)	27 – 2 September 1998	2.07 m (6 ft 9 in)	Goes	(Uruguay)
G	9	Lucas Rodríguez (v (The Bahamas) †)	18 – 23 September 2007	2.00 m (6 ft 7 in)	Peñarol	(Uruguay)
SG	33	Bernardo Barrera (v (The Bahamas) †)	28 – 4 October 1997	1.94 m (6 ft 4 in)	Defensor Sporting	(Uruguay)
PG	11	Lucas Capalbo (v (China) )	26 – 22 March 2000	1.75 m (5 ft 9 in)	Inveready Gipuzkoa	(Spain)
G	15	Facundo Terra (v (Argentina) †)	28 – 14 May 1998	1.88 m (6 ft 2 in)	Platense	(Argentina)

Head coach

- (Uruguay) Gerardo Jauri

Legend

- Age – describes age
  on his last call-up
- (The Bahamas) 2027 FIBA WCQ
  on 15 August 2026
- (China) Friendly match
  on 15 August 2026
- (Argentina) 2027 FIBA WCQ
  on 2 July 2026
- † Preliminary squad

=== Head coach position ===
- (Uruguay) Juan Collazo: 1930–1938
- (Uruguay) Héctor López Reboledo: 1938–1942
- (Uruguay) Raúl Canale: 1942–1949
- (Uruguay) Albérico Passadore: 1949–1950
- (Uruguay) Olguiz Rodríguez: 1950–1953
- (Uruguay) Prudencio de Pena: 1953–1955
- (Uruguay) Héctor López Reboledo: 1955–1959
- (Uruguay) Olguiz Rodríguez: 1959–1960
- (Uruguay) Héctor López Reboledo: 1960–1963
- (Uruguay) Olguiz Rodríguez: 1963
- (Uruguay) Dante Méndez: 1963–1964
- (Uruguay) Raúl Ballefin: 1964–1968
- (Uruguay) Héctor Bassaiztegui: 1968–1971
- (Uruguay) Ramón Etchamendi: 1971–1987
- (Uruguay) Javier Espíndola: 1987–1992
- (Uruguay) Víctor Hugo Berardi: 1992–1997
- (Uruguay) Luis Pierri: 1995
- (Uruguay) César Somma: 1997–2003
- (Uruguay) Hugo Vázquez: 1999
- (Argentina) Che García: 2003–2004
- (Uruguay) Alberto Espasandín: 2004–2008
- (Uruguay) Gerardo Jauri: 2008–2011
- (Uruguay) Álvaro Tito: 2011
- (Uruguay) Pablo Lopez: 2012–2014
- (Spain) Mateo Rubio Díaz 2014
- (Argentina) Adrian Capelli: 2014–2016
- (Uruguay) (Italy) Marcelo Signorelli: 2016–2018
- (Argentina) Rubén Magnano: 2018–2023
- (Uruguay) Gerardo Jauri: 2023–present

=== Past rosters ===
1936 Olympic Games: finished 6th among 21 teams

- Héctor González, Alberto Martí, Amílcar Mesa, Rodolfo Braselli, Carlos Gabin, Leandro Gómez, Gregorio Agos, Tabaré Quintans, Humberto Bernasconi, Prudencio de Pena, Alejo González Roig, Víctor Latou (Coach: Juan Collazo)

1948 Olympic Games: finished 5th among 23 teams

- Martín Acosta y Lara, Nelson Demarco, Héctor García Otero, Adesio Lombardo, Héctor Ruiz, Roberto Lovera, Carlos Rosello, Miguel Diab, Eduardo Folle, Abraham Eidlin Grossman, Gustavo Magarinos, Victorio Cieslinskas, Néstor Anton, Eduardo Gordon (Coach: Raúl Canale)

1952 Olympic Games: finished 3rd among 23 teams

- Martín Acosta y Lara, Héctor García Otero, Adesio Lombardo, Roberto Lovera, Sergio Matto, Wilfredo Peláez, Carlos Rossello, Victorio Cieslinskas, Héctor Costa, Nelson Demarco, Enrique Balino, Tabaré Larre Borges

1954 World Championship: finished 6th among 12 teams

- Oscar Moglia, Martín Acosta y Lara, Héctor García Otero, Roberto Lovera, Nelson Demarco, Adesio Lombardo, Carlos Rosello, Omar Zubillaga, Héctor Costa, Raúl Mera, Manuel Usher Ferrer, Julio César Gully, Sergio Matto, Enrique Balino (Coach: Prudencio de Pena)

1956 Olympic Games: finished 3rd among 15 teams

- Oscar Moglia, Héctor García Otero, Carlos Blixen, Nelson Demarco, Raúl Mera, Héctor Costa, Ariel Olascoaga, Milton Scaron, Sergio Matto, Nelson Chelle, Carlos Gonzáles, Ramiro Cortés (Coach: Héctor López Reboledo)

1959 World Championship: finished 9th among 13 teams

- Héctor García Otero, Carlos Blixen, Milton Scaron, Washington Poyet, Ramiro Cortés, Sergio Matto, Nelson Chelle, Raúl Mera, Manuel Usher Ferrer, Álvaro Roca, Octavio Pedragosa, Adolfo Lubnicki (Coach: Olguiz Rodríguez)

1960 Olympic Games: finished 8th among 16 teams

- Carlos Blixen, Washington Poyet, Milton Scaron, Héctor Costa, Raúl Mera, Nelson Chelle, Sergio Matto, Adolfo Lubnicki, Manuel Gadea, Edison Ciavattone, Waldemar Rial, Danilo Coito (Coach: Héctor López Reboledo)

1963 World Championship: finished 10th among 13 teams

- Carlos Blixen, Ramiro de León, Julio Gómez, Sergio Pisano, Manuel Gadea, Álvaro Roca, Waldemar Rial, Atilio Caneiro, Edison Ciavattone, Oscar Ledesma, Francisco di Matteo, Walter Márquez (Coach: Dante Méndez)

1964 Olympic Games: finished 8th among 16 teams

- Washington Poyet, Julio Gómez, Edison Ciavattone, Álvaro Roca, Manuel Gadea, Ramiro de León, Sergio Pisano, Luis García, Waldemar Rial, Jorge Maya, Walter Márquez, Luis Koster (Coach: Raúl Ballefin)

1967 World Championship: finished 7th among 13 teams

- Oscar Moglia, Washington Poyet, Julio Gómez, Víctor Hernández, Omar Arrestia, Sergio Pisano, Ramiro de León, Luis García, Walter Márquez, Manuel Gadea, Daniel Borroni, Juan Ceriani (Coach: Raúl Ballefin)

1970 World Championship: finished 7th among 13 teams

- Omar Arrestia, Sergio Pisano, Manuel Gadea, Víctor Hernández, Ramiro de León, Luis García, Daniel Borroni, Valentín Rodríguez, José Barizo, Daniel Vannet, Walter Lage, Roberto Bomio (Coach: Héctor Bassaiztegui)

1982 World Championship: finished 11th among 13 teams

- Wilfredo Ruiz, Álvaro Tito, Walter Pagani, Víctor Frattini, Horacio Perdomo, Carlos Peinado, Gerardo Jauri, Germán Haller, Mario Viola, Luis Larrosa, Luis Pierri, Hebert Núñez (Coach: Ramón Etchamendi)

1984 Olympic Games: finished 6th among 12 teams

- Wilfredo Ruiz, Horacio López, Álvaro Tito, Víctor Frattini, Walter Pagani, Juan Mignone, Horacio Perdomo, Carlos Peinado, Luis Pierri, Hebert Núñez, Luis Larrosa, Julio Pereyra (Coach: Ramón Etchamendi)

1986 World Championship: finished 18th among 24 teams

- Horacio López, Ramiro Cortés, Álvaro Tito, Joe McCall, Juan Mignone, Horacio Perdomo, Gabriel Waiter, Luis Larrosa, Luis Pierri, Carlos Peinado, Hebert Núñez, Gustavo Sczygielski. (Coach: Ramón Etchamendi)

1991 Pan American Games: finished 7th among 10 teams

- Alejandro Costa, Juan Blanc, Marcelo Capalbo, Jeffrey Granger, Gustavo Sczygielski, Javier Guerra, Luis Larrosa, Hebert Núñez, Horacio Perdomo, Álvaro Tito, Daniel Koster, and Enrique Tucuna. Head Coach: Javier Espíndola

1995 Pan American Games: finished 4th among 6 teams

- Marcel Bouzout, Gonzalo Caneiro, Marcelo Capalbo, Federico Garcín, Jeffrey Granger, Adrián Laborda, Diego Losada, Alain Mayor, Oscar Moglia Jr., Gustavo Sczygielski, Luis Silveira, and Luis Pierri

1999 Pan American Games: finished 8th among 8 teams

- Adrián Bertolini, Marcel Bouzout, Bruno Abratansky, Jorge Cabrera, Diego Castrillón, Diego Losada, Nicolás Mazzarino, Oscar Moglia Jr., Pablo Morales, Luis Silveira, Martín Suárez, and Hugo Vázquez

2003 Pan American Games: finished 8th among 8 teams

- Mauricio Aguiar, Esteban Batista, Leandro García Morales, Sebastián Leguizamón, Nicolás Mazzarino, Alejandro Muro, Trelonnie Owens, Gastón Paez, Alejandro Pérez, Luis Silveira, Gustavo Szczgielsky, and Emiliano Taboada

2007 Pan American Games: finished 3rd among 8 teams

- Emilio Taboada, Mauricio Aguiar, Leandro García Morales, Esteban Batista, Gastón Paez, Nicolás Mazzarino, Fernando Martínez, Panchi Barrera, Claudio Charquero, Martín Osimani, Juan Pablo Silveira, and Sebastián Izaguirre

FIBA Americas Championship 2009: finished 6th among 10 teams

- Sebastián Izaguirre, Panchi Barrera, Mauricio Aguiar, Emilio Taboada, Diego González, Reque Newsome, Leandro García Morales, Martín Osimani, Gastón Páez, Juan Pablo Silveira, Nicolás Borsellino, and Esteban Batista

South American Basketball Championship 2010: finished 3rd among 8 teams

- Bruno Fitipaldo, Fernando Martínez, Martín Osimani, Joaquín Izuibejeres, Joaquín Osimani, Iván Loriente, Mauricio Aguiar, Mathías Calfani, Reque Newsome, Esteban Batista, Gastón Páez, and Sebastián Izaguirre

FIBA Americas Championship 2013: finished 7th among 10 teams

- Esteban Batista, Frederico Bavosi, Marcos Cabot, Mathias Calfani, Bruno Fitipaldo, Leandro Garcia Morales, Sebastian Izaguirre, Nicolás Mazzarino, Reque Newsome, Emilito Taboada, Sebastián Vázquez, and Kiril Wachsmann

Roster for the 2015 FIBA Americas Championship.

Uruguay national basketball team roster
Players
Coaches

Pos.	No.	Name	Age – Date of birth	Height	Club	Ctr.
SF	6	Mauricio Aguiar	32 – 3 February 1983	1.98 m (6 ft 6 in)	Regatas	(Argentina)
SG	41	Demian Alvarez	30 – 19 October 1984	1.93 m (6 ft 4 in)	Atletico Aguada	(Uruguay)
PF	14	Nicolas Borsellino	29 – 8 May 1986	2.02 m (6 ft 8 in)	Atletico Aguada	(Uruguay)
PF	13	Hernando Caceres	21 – 22 August 1994	2.01 m (6 ft 7 in)	Club Atletico Goes	(Uruguay)
C	7	Mathías Calfani	23 – 21 January 1992	2.02 m (6 ft 8 in)	Club Malvín	(Uruguay)
PG	5	Bruno Fitipaldo	24 – 2 August 1991	1.83 m (6 ft 0 in)	Obras	(Argentina)
C	22	Reque Newsome	33 – 8 October 1981	2.04 m (6 ft 8 in)	Club Malvín	(Uruguay)
G	11	Martín Osimani (C)	34 – 22 May 1981	1.95 m (6 ft 5 in)	Defensor Sporting	(Uruguay)
PG	21	Luciano Parodi	21 – 16 February 1994	1.82 m (6 ft 0 in)	Hebraica y Macabi	(Uruguay)
F	10	Marcel Souberbielle	23 – 29 November 1991	2.00 m (6 ft 7 in)	Club Malvín	(Uruguay)
PG	4	Santiago Vidal	26 – 5 June 1989	1.80 m (5 ft 11 in)	Trouville	(Uruguay)
F/C	33	Kiril Wachsmann	30 – 11 November 1984	2.03 m (6 ft 8 in)	Melilla Baloncesto	(Spain)

Head coach

- (Uruguay) Adrián Capelli

Assistant coach(es)

- (Uruguay) Federico Camina
- (Uruguay) Javier Isis

Legend

- Club – describes last
  club before the tournament
- Age – describes age
  on 30 August 2015

At the 2016 South American Basketball Championship:

Uruguay national basketball team roster
Players
Coaches

Pos.	No.	Name	Age – Date of birth	Height	Club	Ctr.
PG	5	Bruno Fitipaldo	24 – 2 August 1991	1.84 m (6 ft 0 in)	Obras Sanitarias	(Argentina)
SF	6	Mauricio Agular	33 – 3 February 1983	1.99 m (6 ft 6 in)	Defensor Sporting	(Uruguay)
PF	7	Mathias Calfani	24 – 21 January 1992	2.04 m (6 ft 8 in)	Malvin	(Uruguay)
G	9	Panchi Barrera	31 – 6 April 1985	1.94 m (6 ft 4 in)	Aguada	(Uruguay)
PF	12	Juan Ducasse	17 – 2 September 1998	2.04 m (6 ft 8 in)	Club Trouville	(Uruguay)
PF	13	Sebastian Vazquez	30 – 4 September 1985	1.95 m (6 ft 5 in)	Goes	(Uruguay)
C	15	Esteban Batista	32 – 2 September 1983	2.08 m (6 ft 10 in)	Olimpia Milano	(Italy)
PF	19	Frederico Haller	28 – 5 June 1988	1.98 m (6 ft 6 in)	Defensor Sporting	(Uruguay)
G	11	Luciano Parodi	22 – 16 February 1994	1.93 m (6 ft 4 in)	Hebraica Macabi	(Uruguay)
C	22	Reque Newsome	34 – 8 October 1981	2.03 m (6 ft 8 in)	Malvin	(Uruguay)
SF	24	Salvador Zanotta	21 – 25 March 1995	1.82 m (6 ft 0 in)	Hebraica Macabi	(Uruguay)
C	33	Kiril Wachsmann	31 – 12 November 1984	2.03 m (6 ft 8 in)	Defensor Sporting	(Uruguay)

Head coach

- (Uruguay) Marcelo Signorelli

Legend

- Club – describes last
  club before the tournament
- Age – describes age
  on 26 June 2016

== See also ==
- Uruguay women's national basketball team
- Uruguay men's national under-19 basketball team
- Uruguay men's national under-15 and under-16 basketball team
- Uruguay men's national 3x3 team
