= 1995 Tournament of the Americas squads =

This article displays the rosters for the participating teams at the 1995 Tournament of the Americas played in Neuquén and Tucumán, Argentina from August 15 to August 27, 1995.

== Group A ==
=== Barbados ===
- 4 Cosmo Edwards
- 5 Sydney Rowe
- 6 Dwight Rouse
- 7 Andrew Harvey
- 8 Adrian Stewart
- 9 Hallam Stuart
- 10 Victor Payne
- 11 Nigel Lloyd
- 12 Michael Butcher
- 13 Charles Hill
- 14 Andrew Alleyn
- 15 James Phillips

- Head coach: (Barbados) William Harper

=== Canada ===
- 4 Joey Vickery
- 5 Sherman Hamilton
- 6 Phil Dixon
- 7 Steve Nash
- 8 William Njoku
- 9 Michael Meeks
- 10 Kory Hallas
- 11 Dwight Walton
- 12 Martin Keane
- 13 Bobby Allen
- 14 Greg Wiltjer
- 15 Wayne Yearwood

- Head coach: (United States) / (Canada) Steve Konchalski

=== Cuba ===
- 4 Ángel Caballero
- 5 Yudi Abreu
- 6 Pedro Cobarrubia
- 7 Roberto Simón
- 8 José Luis Díaz
- 9 Roberto Amaro
- 10 Leonardo Pérez
- 11 Lazaro Borrell
- 12 Leopoldo Vázquez
- 13 Francisco Cisneros
- 14 Radbel Hechevarría
- 15 Ruperto Herrera García

- Head coach: (Cuba) Miguel Calderón Gómez

=== Dominican Republic ===
- 4 Derek Baker
- 5 Domingo Aquino
- 6 Soterio Ramírez
- 7 Carlos Payano
- 8 Ricardo Vásquez
- 9 Víctor Chacón
- 10 Rafael Nova
- 11 Carlos Martínez
- 12 Tito Horford
- 13 Felipe López
- 14 José Vargas
- 15 Franklin Western

- Head coach: (Dominican Republic) Osiris Duquela

=== Puerto Rico ===
- 4 José Ortiz
- 5 Joël Curbelo
- 6 Pablo Alicea
- 7 Richard Soto
- 8 Jerome Mincy
- 9 Eddie Rivera
- 10 José Nieves
- 11 Ramón Rivas
- 12 Rolando Hourruitiner
- 13 Eugenio Soto
- 14 Francisco de León
- 15 Georgie Torres

- Head coach: (Puerto Rico) Carlos Morales

== Group B ==
=== Argentina ===
- 4 Marcelo Nicola
- 5 Daniel Farabello
- 6 Luis Villar
- 7 Esteban de la Fuente
- 8 Ernesto Michel
- 9 Marcelo Milanesio
- 10 Juan Espil
- 11 Diego Osella
- 12 Fabricio Oberto
- 13 Jorge Racca
- 14 Esteban Pérez
- 15 Rubén Wolkowyski

- Head coach: (Argentina) Guillermo Vecchio

=== Bahamas ===
- Neville Adderley
- Locksley Collie
- Scott Forbes
- Vincent Knowles
- Shawn Merritt
- Marcus Moncur
- Gibbiarra Outten
- Ricardo Pierre
- Shane Taylor
- Michael Wilson

- Head coach: (The Bahamas) Gladstone McPhee

=== Brazil ===
- 4 Chuí
- 5 Ratto
- 6 Caio
- 7 Pipoka
- 8 Ferreira
- 9 Márcio
- 10 Maury
- 11 Minuci
- 12 Josuel
- 13 Rogério
- 14 Oscar
- 15 Israel

- Head coach: (Brazil) Ary Ventura Vidal

=== Uruguay ===
- 4 Juliano Rivera
- 5 Diego Losada
- 6 Luis Pierri
- 7 Enrique Cativelli
- 8 Alain Mayor
- 9 Óscar Moglia
- 10 Marcelo Capalbo
- 11 Gonzalo Caneiro
- 12 Gustavo Szczygielski
- 13 Luis Silveira
- 14 Marcel Bouzout
- 15 Jeff Granger

- Head coach: (Uruguay) Víctor Hugo Berardi

=== Venezuela ===
- 4 Víctor David Díaz
- 5 Diego Guevara
- 6 Armando Becker
- 7 Richard Lugo
- 8 José Ramos
- 9 José Echenique
- 10 Sam Shepherd
- 11 César Portillo
- 12 Miguel Yepez
- 13 Gabriel Estaba
- 14 Iván Olivares
- 15 Omar Walcott

- Head coach: (United States) Mike Davis

== Bibliography ==
- Mexico 2015 FIBA Americas Championship Guía Histórica 1980–2015 (in Spanish). FIBA. 2015. p. 61–68.
