= Basketball at the 1995 Pan American Games =

- Venue: Polideportivo Islas Malvinas
- Dates: March 19–25, 1995
- Teams: 6

Medalists
Gold medal	Argentina
Silver medal	United States
Bronze medal	Brazil

The Basketball Tournament at the 1995 Pan American Games was held in Mar del Plata, Argentina from March 19 to March 25, 1995. The women's tournament was cancelled because as of March 3, 1995, only four women's teams had subscribed. As a result, an extra event was held in Canada between June 22 and 29 of that same year, the 1995 FIBA Americas Championship for Women, which served as the women's basketball tournament for this edition.

All the games were held in Polideportivo Islas Malvinas, which was built for this edition of the Pan American Games. Argentina won their first Pan American Games after beating United States in the final. Argentina, coached by Guillermo Vecchio, finished the tournament unbeaten.

== Men's tournament ==
=== Preliminary round ===
Team	Pts	Pld	W	L	PF	PA	Diff
Argentina	10	5	5	0	423	389	+34
Brazil	9	5	4	1	510	439	+71
United States	8	5	3	2	470	423	+47
Uruguay	7	5	2	3	453	448	+5
Puerto Rico	6	5	1	4	425	473	–48
Mexico	6	5	0	5	399	508	–109

- March 19, 1995

Argentina	68 – 67	United States
Brazil	102 – 88	Puerto Rico
Uruguay	92 – 78	Mexico

- March 20, 1995

Puerto Rico	97 – 86	Mexico
Brazil	101 – 81	United States
Argentina	83 – 81	Uruguay

- March 21, 1995

United States	97 – 78	Puerto Rico
Brazil	107 – 83	Uruguay
Argentina	90 – 80	Mexico

- March 22, 1995

Argentina	87 – 86	Puerto Rico
United States	104 – 96	Uruguay
Brazil	125 – 75	Mexico

- March 23, 1995

Uruguay	101 – 76	Puerto Rico
United States	104 – 80	Mexico
Argentina	95 – 75	Brazil

=== Knockout stages ===
Semi-finals
March 24, 1995
Argentina	90
Uruguay	74
March 24, 1995
United States	89
Brazil	85

Final
March 25, 1995
Argentina	98
United States	85
Third place
March 25, 1995
Uruguay	86
Brazil	90

- March 24, 1995 – 5th/6th place

Mexico	89 – 80	Puerto Rico

- March 24, 1995 – Semi-Finals

Argentina	90 – 74	Uruguay
United States	89 – 85	Brazil

- March 25, 1995 – Bronze Medal Match

Uruguay	86 – 90	Brazil

Gold Medal match

March 25

Report

Argentina	98–85	United States
Scoring by half: 60, 51

Polideportivo Islas Malvinas
Attendance: 8,000

Team details

Argentina
United States

=== Final standings ===
RANK	TEAM	RECORD	PF : PA
	Argentina	7 – 0	611 : 548
	United States	4 – 3	644 : 606
	Brazil	5 – 2	685 : 614
4.	Uruguay	2 – 5	613 : 628
5.	Mexico	1 – 5	488 : 588
6.	Puerto Rico	1 – 5	505 : 562

=== Rosters ===
-	Team	Roster
1	Argentina	Argentina; Marcelo Milanesio, Jorge Racca, Esteban De la Fuente, Luis Villar, Diego Osella, Esteban Pérez, Diego Maggi, Cristian Aragona, Juan Espil, Rubén Wolkowyski, Fabricio Oberto, Coach. Guillermo Edgardo Vecchio
2	United States	(United States) USA; Kelsey Weems, A.J. Wynder, Sean Gay, Carl Thomas, Rumeal Robinson, Brian Davis, Dave Jamerson, Larry Lewis, Erik Martin, Chuckie White, Mike Williams, Scott Paddock, Coach. Mike Thibault
3	Brazil	Brazil; Chuí, João Batista, Luiz Felipe, Gema, Rolando Ferreira, Demétrius Conrado Ferraciú, Alberto, Fernando Minucci, Josuel, Janjão, Rogério, Luisão, Coach. Ary Vidal
4	Uruguay	Uruguay; Marcel Bouzout, Gonzalo Caneiro, Marcelo Capalbo, Federico Garcín, Jeffrey Granger, Adrián Laborda, Diego Losada, Alain Mayor, Oscar Moglia Jr., Gustavo Sczygielski, Luis Silveira, Luis Pierri
5	Mexico	Mexico; Oscar Castellanos, Antonio Reyes, Octavio Robles, Enrique González, Salvador Aguirre, Alberto Martínez, Hector Martínez, Florentino Chávez, Jose Luis Arroyos, Víctor Mariscal, Edgar Loera, Arturo Montes, Coach. Fernando Wong
6	Puerto Rico	Puerto Rico; Eddie Casiano, Jerome Mincy, James Carter, Luis Allende, Édgar de León, Richie Dalmau, Javier Colon, Orlando Vega, Rubén Colón, Deán Borges, Joe Murray, Félix Pérez, Coach. Carlos Morales

== Awards ==
=== Topscorer ===
- (Argentina) Juan Espil 143 pts

1995 Pan American Games winners

Argentina
First title
