= Oscar Moglia =

Uruguayan basketball player (1935–1989)

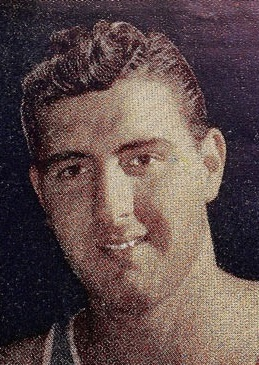

Personal information
- Born: February 1, 1935 Montevideo, Uruguay
- Died: 8 October 1989 (aged 54) Montevideo, Uruguay
- Listed height: 205 cm (6 ft 9 in)
- Listed weight: 102 kg (225 lb)

Career information
- Playing career: 1950–1972
- Position: Small forward
- Number: 25

Career history
- 1950–1972: Club Atlético Welcome

Career highlights
- As player: Summer Olympic Games Top Scorer (1956); 5× Uruguayan Federal Champion (1953, 1956, 1957, 1966, 1967); 8× Uruguayan Federal Championship Top Scorer (1953–1960)
- FIBA Hall of Fame
Medals
Men's basketball
Representing Uruguay
Summer Olympics
Bronze medal – third place	1956 Melbourne
FIBA South American Championship
Gold medal – first place	1953 Uruguay
Gold medal – first place	1955 Colombia
Silver medal – second place	1958 Chile

Oscar Aldo Moglia Eiras (February 1, 1935 – October 8, 1989) was a basketball player from Uruguay.

== Club career ==
During his club career, Moglia played with the Uruguayan team Club Atlético Welcome. He won five Uruguayan Federal Championships (1953, 1956, 1957, 1966, 1967). He was the league's second all-time highest scorer, after Fefo Ruiz, with 11,374 career total points scored.

== National team career ==
With the senior Uruguayan national basketball team, Moglia was the top scorer in points per game, of the 1954 FIBA World Championship, with a scoring average of 18.7 points per game. He was also named to the All-Tournament Team. He won the bronze medal at the 1956 Summer Olympic Games, in Melbourne, Australia. He was also the leading scorer of that tournament, with a scoring average of 26.0 points per game.

He also played at the 1967 FIBA World Championship. He won gold medals at the 1953 FIBA South American Championship and the 1955 FIBA South American Championship, and a silver medal at the 1958 FIBA South American Championship. He was the leading scorer of the FIBA South American Championship three times, (1955, 1958, 1960).

On June 11, Moglia was inducted to the FIBA Hall of Fame, class of 2021.

== Honours and awards ==
=== Club team ===
- Uruguayan Federal championship
  - Champion (5): 1953, 1956, 1957, 1966, 1967
  - Top scorer (8): 1953, 1954, 1955, 1956, 1957, 1958, 1959, 1960

=== National team ===
- FIBA World Championship
  - All-Tournament team: 1954
- Olympic Games
  - Bronze: 1956
  - All-Tournament team: 1956
  - Top scorer: 1956
- FIBA South American Championship
  - Gold (2): 1953, 1955
  - Silver: 1958
  - Top scorer (3): 1955, 1957, 1960
