= Kanela =

Brazilian basketball coach (1906–1992)

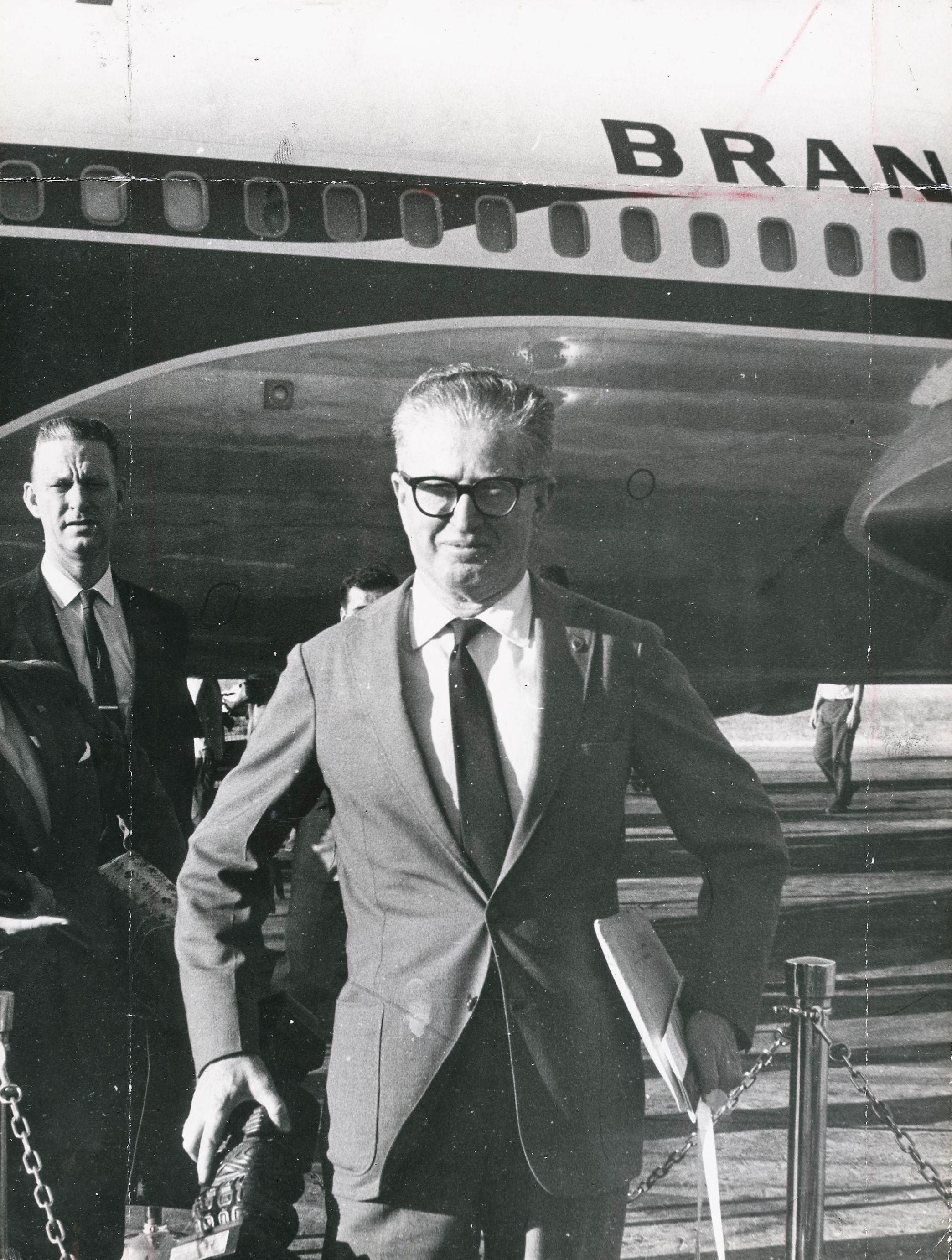
- Kanela in 1963

Personal information
- Born: 22 May 1906 Parahyba do Norte, Paraíba, Brazil
- Died: 12 December 1992 (aged 86) Rio de Janeiro, Brazil
- Position: Head coach
- Coaching career: 1929–1971

Career history

Coaching
- 1929–1936: Botafogo F.R.
- 1933–1947: Botafogo F.R. Basquete
- 1948–1949: C.R. Flamengo
- 1948–1970: C.R. Flamengo Basquete
- 1951, 1954, 1957–1963, 1967, 1970–1971: Brazil
- 1971–1972: S.E. Palmeiras
- 1973–1974: Vila Nova

Career highlights
- As a head coach: South American Club champion (1953); Brazilian champion (1973); São Paulo State champion (1972); 20× Rio de Janeiro State champion (1939, 1942–1945, 1947–1949, 1951–1960, 1962, 1964)
- FIBA Hall of Fame
Medals
Men's basketball
Representing Brazil
Summer Olympic Games
Bronze medal – third place	1960 Rome
FIBA World Cup
Silver medal – second place	1954 Rio de Janeiro
Gold medal – first place	1959 Santiogo de Chile
Gold medal – first place	1963 Rio de Janeiro
Bronze medal – third place	1967 Montevideo
Silver medal – second place	1970 Ljubljana
Pan American Games
Bronze medal – third place	1951 Argentina
Bronze medal – third place	1959 USA
Silver medal – second place	1963 Brazil
FIBA South American Championship
Gold medal – first place	1958 Chile
Gold medal – first place	1960 Argentina
Gold medal – first place	1961 Brazil
Gold medal – first place	1963 Peru
Gold medal – first place	1971 Uruguay

Togo Renan Soares, also commonly known as Kanela (22 May 1906 – 12 December 1992) was a Brazilian professional basketball coach, football coach, water polo coach, and rowing coach. He was born in Parahyba do Norte (present-day João Pessoa), Brazil. The gymnasium Gávea, is named after him. He was enshrined into the FIBA Hall of Fame in 2007.

== Club football managerial career ==
Kanela was the head coach of the Brazilian football club Botafogo F.R., (1929–1936). He was also the Brazilian football club C.R. Flamengo's head coach, (1948–49).

== Club basketball coaching career ==
Kanela began his basketball coaching career as the head coach of the Brazilian club Botafogo F.R. Basquete. With Botafogo, he won 6 Rio de Janeiro State Championships. He was next the head coach of the Brazilian club C.R. Flamengo Basquete, (1948–1970). He led Flamengo to 14 Rio de Janeiro State Championships, including 10 in a row, between 1951 and 1960. With Flamengo, he also won the South American Club Championship, in 1953.

His next club was S.E. Palmeiras, with which he won the São Paulo State Championship in 1972. He ended his club coaching career with Vila Nova, with which he won the Brazilian Championship, in 1973.

== National basketball team coaching career ==
Kanela also coached the senior Brazilian national basketball team. He led them to two gold medals at the FIBA World Cup, in 1959 (beating the USSR in the final game) and 1963 (beating the USA in the final game). He also led them to the following medals: silver medals at the 1954 FIBA World Cup and 1970 FIBA World Cup, a bronze medal at the 1960 Summer Olympics, a bronze medal at the 1967 FIBA World Cup, a silver medal at the 1963 Pan American Games, bronze medals at the 1951 Pan American Games and 1959 Pan American Games, and to five gold medals at the FIBA South American Championship (1958, 1960, 1961, 1963, 1971).

== Coaching career in other sports ==
In addition to coaching in the sports of football and basketball, Kanela also worked as a water polo coach and a rowing coach, with Botafogo F.R.

== Personal ==
Kanela died in Rio de Janeiro, in 1992, at age 86.

== See also ==
- FIBA Basketball World Cup winning head coaches
