= 1997 Tournament of the Americas squads =

This article displays the rosters for the participating teams at the 1997 Tournament of the Americas played in Montevideo, Uruguay from August 21 to August 31, 1997.

== Group A ==
=== Argentina ===
- 4 Gabriel Fernández
- 5 Héctor Campana
- 6 Luis Villar
- 7 Esteban de la Fuente
- 8 Lucas Victoriano
- 9 Marcelo Milanesio
- 10 Juan Espil
- 11 Diego Osella
- 12 Gabriel Díaz
- 13 Jorge Racca
- 14 Patricio Simoni
- 15 Rubén Wolkowyski

- Head coach: (Argentina) Julio Lamas

=== Brazil ===
- 4 Raúl
- 5 Ratto
- 6 Caio
- 7 Olívia
- 8 Josuel
- 9 Demétrius
- 10 Alexei
- 11 Brasília
- 12 Sandro Varejão
- 13 Vanderlei
- 14 Rogério
- 15 Janjão

- Head coach: (Brazil) Hélio Rubens Garcia

=== Cuba ===
- 4 Ángel Caballero
- 5 Yudi Abreu
- 6 Rabdel Echevarría
- 7 Ulises Goire
- 8 Héctor Pino
- 9 Roberto Herrera García
- 10 Leonardo Pérez
- 11 Lazaro Borrell
- 12 Leopoldo Vázquez
- 13 Eliécer Rojas
- 14 Ángel Núñez
- 15 Ruperto Herrera García

- Head coach: (Cuba) Miguel Calderón Gómez

=== Mexico ===
- 4 Óscar Castellanos
- 5 Antonio Reyes
- 6 Andrés Contreras
- 7 Florentino Chávez
- 8 Enrique González
- 9 Silvestre Barajas
- 10 Alberto Martínez
- 11 Luis López
- 12 Javier Zavala
- 13 Erick Martínez
- 14 Miguel Acuña
- 15 Rodrigo Pérez

- Head coach: (Mexico) Luis Fernando Wong

=== Uruguay ===
- 4 Camilo Acosta
- 5 Diego Losada
- 6 Luis Pierri
- 7 Freddy Navarrete
- 8 Nicolás Mazzarino
- 9 Adolfo Medrick
- 10 Marcelo Capalbo
- 11 Óscar Moglia
- 12 Gustavo Szczygielski
- 13 Luis Silveira
- 14 Marcel Bouzout
- 15 Jesus Rostán

- Head coach: (Uruguay) Víctor Hugo Berardi

== Group B ==
=== Canada ===
- 4 Joey Vickery
- 5 Sherman Hamilton
- 6 Eli Pasquale
- 7 Steve Nash
- 8 William Njoku
- 9 Rowan Barrett
- 10 Peter Van Elswyk
- 11 Rob Wilson
- 12 Martin Keane
- 13 Pascal Fleury
- 14 Michael Meeks
- 15 Wayne Yearwood

- Head coach: (Canada) / (United States) Steve Konchalski

=== Dominican Republic ===
- 4 Ricardo Vásquez
- 5 Eladio Almonte
- 6 Soterio Ramírez
- 7 Moisés Michel
- 8 Henry Paulino
- 9 José Mercedes
- 10 José Molina
- 11 Héctor Gil
- 12 Franklin Western
- 13 Ocaris Lenderborg
- 14 Carlos Martínez
- 15 Juan Carlos Eusebio

- Head coach: (Dominican Republic) Miguel Cruzeta

=== Puerto Rico ===
- 4 José Ortiz
- 5 Eddie Casiano
- 6 Orlando Santiago
- 7 Erick Rivera
- 8 Jerome Mincy
- 9 James Carter
- 10 Carlos Lanauze
- 11 Ramón Rivas
- 12 Rolando Hourruitiner
- 13 Édgar de León
- 14 Luis Allende
- 15 Daniel Santiago

- Head coach: (Puerto Rico) Carlos Morales

=== United States ===
- 4 Rusty LaRue
- 5 Corey Beck
- 6 Jim Farmer
- 7 Jason Sasser
- 8 Erik Martin
- 9 Adrian Griffin
- 10 Reggie Jordan
- 11 Kermit Holmes
- 12 Evers Burns
- 13 Russ Millard
- 14 Travis Williams
- 15 Michael McDonald

- Head coach: (United States) Morris McHone

=== Venezuela ===
- 4 Víctor David Díaz
- 5 José Hernández
- 6 Ernesto Mijares
- 7 Richard Lugo
- 8 Alex Quiroz
- 9 Víctor González
- 10 Armando Becker
- 11 Omar Walcott
- 12 Richard Medina
- 13 Gabriel Estaba
- 14 Iván Olivares
- 15 Ludwing Irazábal

- Head coach: (Puerto Rico) Julio Toro

== Bibliography ==
- Mexico 2015 FIBA Americas Championship Guía Histórica 1980–2015 (in Spanish). FIBA. 2015. p. 71–78.
