= FIBA South America Under-21 Championship for Men =

- Formerly: FIBA South American Championship for Men "22 and Under"; FIBA South American Championship for Young Men
- Sport: Basketball
- Founder: FIBA Americas
- Continent: South America
- Related competitions: FIBA Under-21 World Championship
- Website: www.fiba.basketball

The FIBA South America Under-21 Championship for Men is a sporadically held basketball tournament. With the FIBA Americas Under-20 Championship having not been held since 2004 and no plans to hold it in the near future, this tournament's future is in doubt.

== 1996 FIBA South American Championship for Men "22 and Under" ==
The tournament was played in Vitória, Brazil, from 10 to 15 June 1996.

1. Brazil
2. Argentina
3. Uruguay
4. Venezuela
5. Chile
6. Ecuador

== 2000 FIBA South American Championship for Young Men ==
The tournament was played in Montevideo, Uruguay, from 24 June to 2 July 2000.

1. Argentina
2. Brazil
3. Uruguay
4. Venezuela
5. Colombia
6. Peru
7. Paraguay
8. Bolivia
9. Chile
10. Ecuador

== 2004 FIBA U21 South American Championship for Men ==
The tournament was played in Ancud, Chile, from 14 to 20 June 2004.

1. Argentina
2. Brazil
3. Venezuela
4. Paraguay
5. Colombia
6. Chile
7. Uruguay
8. Bolivia

== 2018 FIBA U21 South American Championship for Men ==
The tournament was played in Salta, Argentina, from 30 July to 5 August 2018.

1. Brazil
2. Argentina
3. Uruguay
4. Chile
5. Peru
6. Paraguay

== 2019 FIBA U21 South American Championship for Men ==
The tournament was played in Tunja, Colombia, from 12 to 18 August 2019.

1. Brazil
2. Argentina
3. Chile
4. Uruguay
5. Venezuela
6. Colombia
7. Paraguay

== See also ==
- FIBA U17 South American Championship
- FIBA U15 South American Championship
- FIBA U17 Women's South American Championship
- FIBA U15 Women's South American Championship
