= Waldemar Blatskauskas =

Brazilian basketball player (1938–1964)

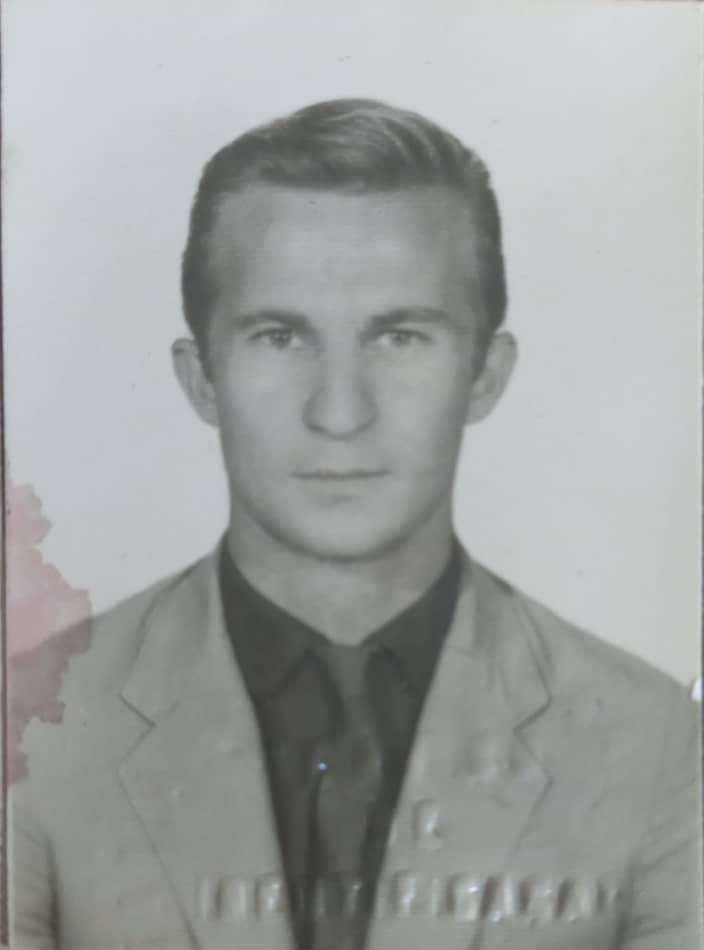

Personal information
- Born: 17 March 1938 São Paulo, Brazil
- Died: 6 March 1964 (aged 25)
- Listed height: 6 ft 2.5 in (1.89 m)
- Position: Small forward / power forward

Career history
- Regatas Campinas
- Tietê
- São Carlos Clube
- XV de Novembro de Piracicaba
Medals
Men's basketball
Representing Brazil
Summer Olympic Games
Bronze medal – third place	1960 Rome
FIBA World Cup
Gold medal – first place	1959 Santiago de Chile
Gold medal – first place	1963 Rio de Janeiro
Pan American Games
Bronze medal – third place	1959 Chicago
Silver medal – second place	1963 São Paulo
FIBA South American Championship
Gold medal – first place	1958 Chile
Gold medal – first place	1961 Brazil
Summer Universiade
Gold medal – first place	1963 Brazil

Waldemar Blatskauskas (17 March 1938 – 6 March 1964), also known simply as Waldemar, was a Brazilian professional basketball player of Lithuanian descent.

== Personal life ==
Blatskauskas was of Lithuanian descent as he was born in a family of Lithuanian emigrants to Brazil.

== Club career ==
During his pro career, Blatkauskas played with the Brazilian clubs Regatas Campinas, Tietê, São Carlos Clube, and XV de Novembro de Piracicaba.

== National team career ==
Blatkauskas was a member of the senior Brazilian national basketball team that won gold medals at the 1959 FIBA World Championship, and the 1963 FIBA World Championship. With Brazil, he also won a bronze medal at the 1960 Summer Olympic Games. He also won the following medals: a bronze medal at the 1959 Pan American Games, a silver medal at the 1963 Pan American Games, gold medals at the 1958 FIBA South American Championship and the 1961 FIBA South American Championship, and a gold medal at the 1963 Summer Universiade.

== Death and legacy ==
Blatkauskas died in Brazil, in a traffic accident, on 6 March 1964.

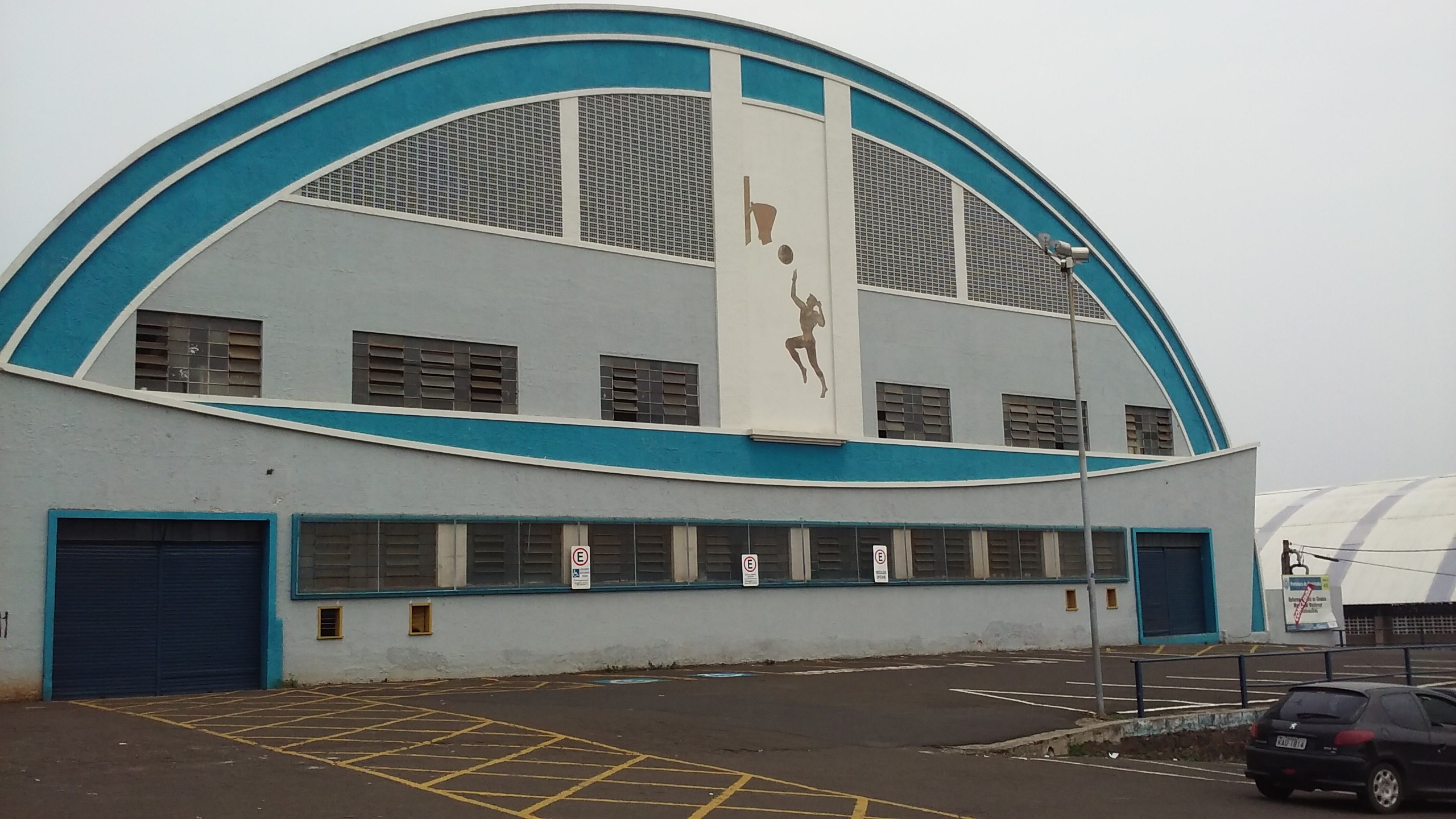
The Ginásio Municipal Waldemar Blatkauskas (Municipal Gymnasium) in Piracicaba, Brazil.

That same year, the Piracicaba municipal sports gymnasium was given the name "Ginásio Municipal Waldemar Blatkauskas" in his memory.
