= Basketball at the 2019 Pan American Games – Men's tournament =

Tournament details
- Host country: Peru
- Dates: 31 July–4 August
- Teams: 8 (from 1 federation)
- Venue(s): 1 (in 1 host city)

Final positions
- Champions: Argentina (2nd title)

The men's basketball tournament at the 2019 Pan American Games was held in Lima, Peru at the Coliseo Eduardo Dibos from 31 July to 4 August. The teams were grouped into two pools of four teams each for a round-robin preliminary round. The top two teams in each group advanced to a single elimination bracket. Argentina won the gold medal, its second gold in Pan American basketball, after defeating Puerto Rico in the championship

== Qualification ==
A total of eight men's teams qualified to compete at the games. The top seven teams at the 2017 FIBA AmeriCup have qualified. The host nation Peru was barred from participating by FIBA, following sanctions imposed on the Peruvian Basketball Federation. Venezuela took the vacated berth.

=== Summary ===
Event	Date	Location	Vacancies	Qualified
Host Nation	—	—	~~1~~ 0	~~Peru~~
2017 FIBA AmeriCup	August 25 – September 3	Various	~~7~~ 8	United States; Argentina; Mexico; Virgin Islands; Puerto Rico; Uruguay; Dominican Republic; Venezuela
Total			8	

== Draw ==
The draw was held in San Juan, Puerto Rico on 23 May 2019.

Pot 1	Pot 2	Pot 3	Pot 4
United States; Argentina	Puerto Rico; Mexico	Dominican Republic; Venezuela	Uruguay; Virgin Islands

== Rosters ==
At the start of tournament, all eight participating countries had up to 12 players on their rosters.

- Argentina
- Dominican Republic
- Mexico
- Puerto Rico
- United States
- Uruguay
- Venezuela
- Virgin Islands

== Competition format ==
In the first round of the competition, teams are divided into two pools of four teams, and play follows a round robin format with each of the teams playing all other teams in the pool once. Teams are awarded two points for a win, and one point for a loss.

Following the completion of the pool games, the top two teams from each pool advance to a single elimination round consisting of two semifinal games, and the bronze and gold medal matches. Losing teams compete in classification matches to determine their ranking in the tournament.

== Results ==
All times are local (UTC−5)

=== Preliminary round ===
==== Group A ====
Team	Pld	W	L	PF	PA	PD	Pts	Qualification
Argentina	3	2	1	268	234	+34	5	Qualified for the Semifinals
Dominican Republic	3	2	1	245	220	+25	5	Qualified for the Semifinals
Uruguay	3	1	2	194	246	−52	4	
Mexico	3	1	2	194	201	−7	4	

31 July 2019
18:00

Report

Argentina	102–65	Uruguay
Scoring by quarter: 27–2, 24–15, 22–27, 29–21
Pts: Deck 23; Rebs: Scola 8 Asts: Scola 4		Pts: Parodi 11; Rebs: Four players 3 Asts: Parodi, Rodríguez, Wachsmann 2

Coliseo Eduardo Dibos, Lima
Referees: Steven Anderson (USA)

31 July 2019
21:00

Report

Mexico	61–65 (OT)	Dominican Republic
Scoring by quarter: 6–20, 13–13, 22–14, 14–8, Overtime: 6–10
Pts: Estrada 18; Rebs: Gutiérrez 9 Asts: Estrada 5		Pts: Rojas, Suero 13; Rebs: Santos, Vargas 6 Asts: Four players 1

Coliseo Eduardo Dibos, Lima
Referees: Jorge Vázquez (PUR)

1 August 2019
13:30

Report

Dominican Republic	97–102 (OT)	Argentina
Scoring by quarter: 18–21, 19–22, 18–23, 32–21, Overtime: 10–15
Pts: De León 21; Rebs: Montero 8 Asts: Montero 3		Pts: Deck 24; Rebs: Campazzo, Deck 6 Asts: Campazzo 7

Coliseo Eduardo Dibos, Lima
Referees: Jorge Vázquez (PUR)

1 August 2019
18:00

Report

Mexico	61–72	Uruguay
Scoring by quarter: 12–19, 12–11, 22–14, 15–28
Pts: Zesati 19; Rebs: Zesati 6 Asts: Estrada 2		Pts: Rojas 19; Rebs: Rojas 5 Asts: Parodi 4

Coliseo Eduardo Dibos, Lima
Referees: Michael Weiland (CAN)

2 August 2019
10:30

Report

Uruguay	57–83	Dominican Republic
Scoring by quarter: 19–15, 12–20, 12–19, 14–29
Pts: Four players 9 Rebs: Wachsmann 13; Asts: Parodi 5		Pts: Figueroa 16; Rebs: Rojas, Vargas 5 Asts: Solano 9

Coliseo Eduardo Dibos, Lima
Referees: Jorge Vazquez (PUR)

2 August 2019
13:30

Report

Mexico	72–64	Argentina
Scoring by quarter: 10–20, 17–15, 24–20, 21–9
Pts: Estrada 18; Rebs: Gutiérrez 8 Asts: Estrada, Machado, Velis 2		Pts: Deck 13; Rebs: Fjellerup 7 Asts: Brussino 3

Coliseo Eduardo Dibos, Lima
Referees: Luis Vazquez (PUR)

==== Group B ====
Team	Pld	W	L	PF	PA	PD	Pts	Qualification
Puerto Rico	3	3	0	261	237	+24	6	Qualified for the Semifinals
United States	3	2	1	273	224	+49	5	Qualified for the Semifinals
Venezuela	3	1	2	204	227	−23	4	
Virgin Islands	3	0	3	257	307	−50	3	

31 July 2019
10:30

Report

United States	119–84	Virgin Islands
Scoring by quarter: 39–23, 17–20, 35–19, 28–22
Pts: Diallo 20; Rebs: Diallo 11; Asts: Gillespie 3		Pts: Hodge 18; Rebs: Aska 8 Asts: Milligan 8

Coliseo Eduardo Dibos, Lima
Referees: Michael Weiland (CAN)

31 July 2019
13:30

Report

Puerto Rico	73–64	Venezuela
Scoring by quarter: 11–12, 15–18, 23–14, 24–20
Pts: Collier 13; Rebs: Andujar 9 Asts: Collier 4		Pts: Colmenares, Zamora 12; Rebs: Colmenares 13; Asts: Vargas 8

Coliseo Eduardo Dibos, Lima
Referees: Leandro Lezcano (ARG)

1 August 2019
10:30

Report

Puerto Rico	101–89	Virgin Islands
Scoring by quarter: 33–11, 26–16, 18–27, 24–35
Pts: Sosa 25; Rebs: Andujar 8 Asts: Collier 3		Pts: Hodge 27; Rebs: Aska 9 Asts: Hodge 5

Coliseo Eduardo Dibos, Lima
Referees: Andréia Silva (BRA)

1 August 2019
21:00

Report

Venezuela	53–70	United States
Scoring by quarter: 13–20, 16–14, 8–16, 16–20
Pts: Colmenares 16; Rebs: Vargas 9 Asts: Colmenares, Vargas 2		Pts: Powell 30; Rebs: Gillespie 7 Asts: Diallo 3

Coliseo Eduardo Dibos, Lima
Referees: Cristiano Maranho (BRA)

2 August 2019
18:00

Report

Virgin Islands	84–87	Venezuela
Scoring by quarter: 19–19, 29–20, 15–24, 21–24
Pts: Milligan 22; Rebs: three players 7 Asts: Hodge 3		Pts: Zamora 19; Rebs: Carrera 11; Asts: Vargas 4

Coliseo Eduardo Dibos, Lima
Referees: Michael Weiland (CAN)

2 August 2019
21:00

Report

Puerto Rico	87–84	United States
Scoring by quarter: 27–38, 19–19, 18–15, 23–12
Pts: Collier 23; Rebs: Collier 10; Asts: Gandía 4		Pts: Samuels 17; Rebs: Cale 5 Asts: Gillespie, Powell 2

Coliseo Eduardo Dibos, Lima
Referees: Cristiano Maranho (BRA)

=== Classification round ===
==== Placement stage (5th–8th place) ====
7th place
3 August
Virgin Islands	81
Mexico	92

5th place
3 August
Venezuela	78
Uruguay	68

==== Seventh place match ====
3 August 2019
10:30

Report

Virgin Islands	81–92	Mexico
Scoring by quarter: 13–26, 11–28, 31–12, 26–26
Pts: Hodge 25; Rebs: Perry-Murray 5 Asts: Aska 3		Pts: Camacho 18; Rebs: Gutiérrez 9 Asts: Five players 5

Coliseo Eduardo Dibos, Lima
Referees: Luis Vazquez (PUR)

==== Fifth place match ====
3 August 2019
13:30

Report

Venezuela	78–68	Uruguay
Scoring by quarter: 19–25, 17–12, 23–22, 19–9
Pts: Zamora 15; Rebs: Graterol 7 Asts: Guillent 3		Pts: Rojas 17; Rebs: Wachsmann 7 Asts: Parodi 3

Coliseo Eduardo Dibos, Lima
Referees: Jorge Vazquez (PUR)

=== Knockout round ===
Semifinals
3 August — Coliseo Eduardo Dibos
Puerto Rico	65
Dominican Republic	63
3 August — Coliseo Eduardo Dibos
Argentina	114
United States	75

Final
4 August — Coliseo Eduardo Dibos
Puerto Rico	66
Argentina	84
Third place
4 August — Coliseo Eduardo Dibos
Dominican Republic	83
United States	92

==== Semifinals ====
3 August 2019
18:00

Report

Puerto Rico	65–63	Dominican Republic
Scoring by quarter: 13–18, 21–8, 15–14, 16–23
Pts: Sosa 13; Rebs: Andujar, Reese 7 Asts: Soto 3		Pts: Suero, Vargas 15; Rebs: Rojas, Vargas 7 Asts: Montero 2

Coliseo Eduardo Dibos, Lima
Referees: Leandro Lezcano (ARG)

3 August 2019
21:00

Report

Argentina	114–75	United States
Scoring by quarter: 29–18, 32–18, 30–20, 23–19
Pts: Deck 23; Rebs: Brussino 8 Asts: Campazzo 5		Pts: Duke 16; Rebs: Reeves 6 Asts: Gillespie 5

Coliseo Eduardo Dibos, Lima
Referees: Cristiano Maranho (BRA)

==== Bronze medal match ====
4 August 2019
18:00

Report

Dominican Republic	83–92	United States
Scoring by quarter: 20–20, 18–16, 27–24, 18–32
Pts: Solano 26; Rebs: Montero 9 Asts: De León 4		Pts: Diallo 23; Rebs: Groselle 10; Asts: Diallo 3

Coliseo Eduardo Dibos, Lima
Referees: Leandro Lezcano (ARG)

==== Gold medal match ====
4 August 2019
21:00

Report

Puerto Rico	66–84	Argentina
Scoring by quarter: 18–27, 12–13, 20–20, 16–24
Pts: Collier 19; Rebs: Collier 12; Asts: Soto 3		Pts: Scola 28; Rebs: Scola 9 Asts: Campazzo 12

Coliseo Eduardo Dibos, Lima
Referees: Cristiano Maranho (BRA)

== Awards ==
=== Topscorer ===
- (Argentina) Gabriel Deck 94 pts (18.8 ppg)
- (United States Virgin Islands) Walter Hodge 88 pts (22.0 ppg)

2019 Pan American Games winners

Argentina

== Final standings ==
Rank	Team	Record
1st place, gold medalist(s)	Argentina	4–1
2nd place, silver medalist(s)	Puerto Rico	4–1
3rd place, bronze medalist(s)	United States	3–2
4	Dominican Republic	2–3
5	Venezuela	2–2
6	Uruguay	1–3
7	Mexico	2–2
8	Virgin Islands	0–4
