= 1942 South American Basketball Championship =

10th South American Basketball Championship

Tournament details
- Host country: Chile
- Dates: 7-17 March
- Teams: 5
- Venue: 1 (in 1 host city)

Final positions
- Champions: Argentina (4th title)

The 1942 South American Basketball Championship was the 10th edition of this tournament. It was held in Santiago, Chile and won by the Argentina national basketball team. It was the first time since the 1935 championship that the host had not won the competition. 5 teams competed despite the World War that was under way.

== Final rankings ==
1. Argentina
2. Uruguay
3. Chile
4. Brazil
5. Ecuador

== Results ==
=== Preliminary round ===
Each team played the other four teams once, for a total of four games played by each team and 10 overall in the preliminary round.

The tie for third place was resolved by head-to-head results, with Chile taking the bronze medal as they beat Brazil.

As Argentina and Uruguay were tied for first place, a final game to determine the championship was required.

Rank	Team	Pts	W	L	PF	PA	Diff
=1	Argentina	7	3	1	235	169	+66
=1	Uruguay	7	3	1	149	121	+28
3	Chile	6	2	2	181	202	-21
4	Brazil	6	2	2	173	170	+3
5	Ecuador	4	0	4	169	245	-76

Argentina	32 - 37	Uruguay
Argentina	65 - 44	Chile
Argentina	44 - 29	Brazil
Argentina	94 - 59	Ecuador
Uruguay	43 - 29	Chile
Uruguay	33 - 36	Brazil
Uruguay	36 - 24	Ecuador
Chile	53 - 48	Brazil
Chile	55 - 46	Ecuador
Brazil	60 - 40	Ecuador

=== Final ===
Argentina and Uruguay played a final matchup after each finishing 3-1 in the preliminary round. Uruguay had won the preliminary meeting between the two, but Argentina proved victorious in the rematch to take the gold medal.

Argentina	52 - 47	Uruguay
