= 1938 South American Basketball Championship =

6th South American Basketball Championship

Tournament details
- Host country: Peru
- Dates: 12-22 February
- Teams: 5
- Venue: 1 (in 1 host city)

Final positions
- Champions: Peru (1st title)

The 1938 South American Basketball Championship was the 6th edition of this tournament. It was held in Lima, Peru and won by the host, Peru national basketball team. 5 teams competed, including Ecuador in their first appearance.

== Final rankings ==
1. Peru
2. Argentina
3. Uruguay
4. Brazil
5. Ecuador

== Results ==
Each team played the other four teams once, for a total of four games played by each team and 10 overall in the tournament.

Rank	Team	Pts	W	L	PF	PA	Diff
1	Peru	8	4	0	203	167	+36
2	Argentina	7	3	1	218	180	+38
3	Uruguay	6	2	2	160	139	+21
4	Brazil	5	1	3	174	195	-21
5	Ecuador	4	0	4	132	206	-74

Peru	61 - 55	Argentina
Peru	42 - 36	Uruguay
Peru	50 - 47	Brazil
Peru	50 - 29	Ecuador
Argentina	46 - 39	Uruguay
Argentina	60 - 38	Brazil
Argentina	57 - 42	Ecuador
Uruguay	45 - 30	Brazil
Uruguay	40 - 21	Ecuador
Brazil	59 - 40	Ecuador
