= 1943 South American Basketball Championship =

11th South American Basketball Championship

Tournament details
- Host country: Peru
- Dates: 3-17 May
- Teams: 6
- Venue(s): 1 (in 1 host city)

Final positions
- Champions: Argentina (5th title)

The 1943 South American Basketball Championship was the 11th edition of regional tournament. It was held in Lima, Peru and won by the Argentina national basketball team. 6 teams, including Bolivia in their first appearance, competed despite the World War that was currently under way.

== Final rankings ==
1. Argentina
2. Uruguay
3. Peru
4. Chile
5. Paraguay
6. Bolivia

== Results ==
=== Preliminary round ===
Each team played the other five teams once, for a total of five games played by each team and 15 overall in the preliminary round. Placing in the top four qualified a team to move on to the final round.

Rank	Team	Pts	W	L	PF	PA	Diff
1	Peru	10	5	0	205	134	+71
2	Uruguay	9	4	1	223	117	+106
3	Chile	8	3	2	222	166	+56
4	Argentina	7	2	3	204	154	+50
5	Paraguay	6	1	4	121	292	-171
6	Bolivia	5	0	5	137	249	-112

Peru	23 - 21	Uruguay
Peru	38 - 37	Chile
Peru	42 - 32	Argentina
Peru	66 - 22	Paraguay
Peru	36 - 22	Bolivia
Uruguay	39 - 33	Chile
Uruguay	30 - 24	Argentina
Uruguay	72 - 15	Paraguay
Uruguay	61 - 22	Bolivia
Chile	40 - 27	Argentina
Chile	56 - 23	Paraguay
Chile	56 - 39	Bolivia
Argentina	66 - 20	Paraguay
Argentina	55 - 22	Bolivia
Paraguay	41 - 32	Bolivia

=== Final round ===
The top four teams advanced to the final round, where they played each of the other three once. Only the results from this round were used to determine final placing for the top four.

Rank	Team	Pts	W	L	PF	PA	Diff
1	Argentina	6	3	0	106	79	+27
2	Uruguay	5	2	1	102	82	+20
3	Peru	4	1	2	90	84	+6
4	Chile	3	0	3	77	130	-53

Argentina	32 - 29	Uruguay
Argentina	34 - 23	Peru
Argentina	40 - 27	Chile
Uruguay	66 - 22	Peru
Uruguay	46 - 27	Chile
Peru	44 - 23	Chile

Argentina line-up: Candido Arrua (Santa Fe), Jose Alberto Beltran (Capital Federal), Carlos Jensen Buhl (Capital Federal), Julio Carrasco (Santa Fe), Gustavo Chazarreta (Stgo del Estero), Mario Jimenez (Stgo del Estero), Rafael Lledo (Stgo del Estero), Italo Malvicini (Santa Fe), Marcelino Ojeda (Corrientes), Hector Romagnolo (Capital Federal), Carlos Sanchez (Stgo del Estero), Oscar Serena (Santa Fe). Coach: Saul Ramirez Manfredi.
