= 1963 South American Basketball Championship =

20th South American Basketball Championship

Tournament details
- Host country: Peru
- Dates: February 14 - March 4
- Teams: 9
- Venue(s): 1 (in 1 host city)

Final positions
- Champions: Brazil (6th title)

The South American Basketball Championship 1963 was the 19th edition of this regional tournament. It was held from February 14 to March 4 in Lima, Peru. Nine teams competed.

== Results ==
The final standings were determined by a round robin, where the 9 teams played against each other once.

Rank	Team	Pts	W	L	PF	PA	Diff
1	Brazil	15	7	1	634	410	+224
2	Peru	15	7	1	565	436	+129
3	Uruguay	15	7	1	552	474	+78
4	Argentina	13	5	3	552	497	+55
5	Paraguay	12	4	4	469	446	+23
6	Ecuador	11	3	5	478	551	-73
7	Chile	10	2	6	474	518	-44
8	Colombia	9	1	7	428	583	-155
9	Bolivia	8	0	8	364	601	-237

Uruguay	86–62	Colombia

Peru	79–36	Bolivia

Brazil	62–53	Paraguay

Peru	71–47	Colombia

Paraguay	64–28	Bolivia

Uruguay	68–66	Ecuador

Argentina	65–62	Chile

Argentina	70–29	Bolivia

Peru	73–57	Ecuador

Chile	77–53	Colombia

Brazil	90–39	Ecuador

Brazil	87–41	Colombia

Argentina	64–58	Paraguay

Ecuador	71–51	Bolivia

Uruguay	76–52	Chile

Peru	71–51	Paraguay

Paraguay	58–50	Ecuador

Brazil	110–49	Bolivia

Peru	65–49	Chile

Colombia	59–52	Bolivia

Brazil	80–53	Chile

Uruguay	73–65	Argentina

Ecuador	63–55	Colombia

Uruguay	59–53	Paraguay

Peru	77–65	Argentina

Argentina	72–49	Colombia

Paraguay	57–50	Chile

Uruguay	52–50	Brazil

Chile	68–57	Bolivia

Paraguay	75–62	Colombia

Peru	64–58	Uruguay

Ecuador	65–63	Chile

Uruguay	80–62	Bolivia

Brazil	82–58	Argentina

Argentina	93–67	Ecuador

Brazil	73–65	Peru
