= Martín Suárez =

Martín Suárez may refer to:

- Martín Suárez (basketball)
- Martín Suárez (footballer)
- Martin Suarez (comics)

== See also ==
- Martín Suárez de Toledo, Spanish nobleman and conquistador
