= 1947 South American Basketball Championship =

Basketball tournament

13th South American Basketball Championship

Tournament details
- Host country: Brazil
- Dates: 31 May - 17 June
- Teams: 6
- Venue: 1 (in 1 host city)

Final positions
- Champions: Uruguay (4th title)

The 1947 South American Basketball Championship was the 13th edition of this regional tournament. It was held in Rio de Janeiro, Brazil, and won by the Uruguay national basketball team. 6 teams competed.

== Final rankings ==
1. Uruguay
2. Brazil
3. Chile
4. Ecuador
5. Argentina
6. Peru

== Results ==
Each team played the other five teams once, for a total of five games played by each team and 15 overall in the preliminary round. Ties in the standings were broken by head-to-head results, as only a tie for first would have resulted in a final match.

| Rank | Team | Pts | W | L | PF | PA | Diff |
|---|---|---|---|---|---|---|---|
| 1 | Uruguay | 10 | 5 | 0 | 225 | 183 | +42 |
| 2 | Brazil | 8 | 3 | 2 | 200 | 181 | +19 |
| 3 | Chile | 8 | 3 | 2 | 205 | 193 | +12 |
| 4 | Ecuador | 7 | 2 | 3 | 193 | 234 | -41 |
| 5 | Argentina | 7 | 2 | 3 | 223 | 228 | -5 |
| 6 | Peru | 5 | 0 | 5 | 196 | 223 | -27 |

| Uruguay | 37 - 27 | Brazil |
| Uruguay | 45 - 44 | Chile |
| Uruguay | 46 - 33 | Ecuador |
| Uruguay | 51 - 48 | Argentina |
| Uruguay | 46 - 31 | Peru |
| Brazil | 44 - 33 | Chile |
| Brazil | 50 - 34 | Ecuador |
| Brazil | 37 - 38 | Argentina |
| Brazil | 42 - 39 | Peru |
| Chile | 52 - 31 | Ecuador |
| Chile | 42 - 41 | Argentina |
| Chile | 34 - 32 | Peru |
| Ecuador | 47 - 43 | Argentina |
| Ecuador | 48 - 43 | Peru |
| Argentina | 53 - 51 | Peru |
