= 1945 South American Basketball Championship =

12th South American Basketball Championship

Tournament details
- Host country: Ecuador
- Dates: 17 July - 2 August
- Teams: 6
- Venue(s): 1 (in 1 host city)

Final positions
- Champions: Brazil (2nd title)

The 1945 South American Basketball Championship was the 12th edition of this regional tournament. It was held in Guayaquil, Ecuador and won by the Brazil national basketball team. Six teams competed, including Colombia in their first appearance. After an experiment with a two-round tournament two years earlier, the 1945 competition returned to a single round format.

== Final rankings ==
1. Brazil
2. Uruguay
3. Argentina
4. Chile
5. Ecuador
6. Colombia

== Results ==
Each team played the other five teams once, for a total of five games played by each team and 15 overall in the preliminary round.

Rank	Team	Pts	W	L	PF	PA	Diff
1	Brazil	10	5	0	233	170	+63
2	Uruguay	9	4	1	231	181	+50
3	Argentina	8	3	2	271	239	+32
4	Chile	7	2	3	208	187	+21
5	Ecuador	6	1	4	209	206	+3
6	Colombia	5	0	5	180	349	-169

Brazil	31 - 26	Uruguay
Brazil	53 - 51	Argentina
Brazil	50 - 42	Chile
Brazil	30 - 26	Ecuador
Brazil	69 - 25	Colombia
Uruguay	55 - 49	Argentina
Uruguay	35 - 30	Chile
Uruguay	47 - 30	Ecuador
Uruguay	68 - 41	Colombia
Argentina	41 - 37	Chile
Argentina	50 - 42	Ecuador
Argentina	80 - 52	Colombia
Chile	41 - 37	Ecuador
Chile	58 - 24	Colombia
Ecuador	74 - 38	Colombia
