= 1941 South American Basketball Championship =

9th South American Basketball Championship

Tournament details
- Host country: Argentina
- Dates: 18 April – 26 May
- Teams: 6
- Venue(s): 1 (in 1 host city)

Final positions
- Champions: Argentina (3rd title)

The 1941 South American Basketball Championship was the 9th edition of this tournament. It was held in Mendoza, Argentina and won by the host, Argentina national basketball team. Six teams competed despite the World War that was then under way.

== Final rankings ==
1. Argentina
2. Peru
3. Uruguay
4. Chile
5. Brazil
6. Paraguay

== Results ==
Each team played the other five teams once, for a total of five games played by each team and 15 overall in the tournament.

| Rank | Team | Pts | W | L | PF | PA | Diff |
|---|---|---|---|---|---|---|---|
| 1 | Argentina | 10 | 5 | 0 | 233 | 129 | +104 |
| 2 | Peru | 9 | 4 | 1 | 224 | 167 | +57 |
| 3 | Uruguay | 8 | 3 | 2 | 206 | 151 | +55 |
| 4 | Chile | 7 | 2 | 3 | 190 | 208 | −18 |
| 5 | Brazil | 6 | 1 | 4 | 187 | 208 | −21 |
| 6 | Paraguay | 5 | 0 | 5 | 144 | 321 | −177 |

| Argentina | 32–17 | Peru |
| Argentina | 33–25 | Uruguay |
| Argentina | 51–32 | Chile |
| Argentina | 51–26 | Brazil |
| Argentina | 66–29 | Paraguay |
| Peru | 37–36 | Uruguay |
| Peru | 46–36 | Chile |
| Peru | 48–28 | Brazil |
| Peru | 76–35 | Paraguay |
| Uruguay | 48–27 | Chile |
| Uruguay | 32–30 | Brazil |
| Uruguay | 65–24 | Paraguay |
| Chile | 48–36 | Brazil |
| Chile | 47–27 | Paraguay |
| Brazil | 67–29 | Paraguay |
