= Joaquín Izuibejeres =

Uruguayan basketball player

Joaquín Izuibejeres (born February 23, 1982, in Montevideo, Uruguay) is a Uruguayan professional basketball player. His jersey's number is 5. He is a longtime member of the Uruguay national basketball team, having played in the 2006 and 2010 South American basketball championships and the 2003 Pan American Games, and is currently (2015-2016 season) playing professionally with Trouville of Liga Uruguaya de Basketball.
