= 1955 South American Basketball Championship =

16th South American Basketball Championship

Tournament details
- Host country: Colombia
- Dates: August 13–31
- Teams: 9
- Venue(s): 1 (in 1 host city)

Final positions
- Champions: Uruguay (7th title)

The South American Basketball Championship 1955 was the 16th edition of this tournament. It was played in Cúcuta, Colombia. The title holder is Uruguay.

== Preliminary round ==
Team	Pts.	W	L	PCT	PF	PA	Diff
Brazil	6	3	0	1.000	183	138	+45
Paraguay	6	3	0	1.000	177	148	+29
Peru	5	2	1	0.667	154	163	-9
Uruguay	4	2	0	1.000	125	91	+34
Argentina	4	2	0	1.000	128	97	+31
Chile	3	0	3	0.000	154	168	-14
Ecuador	3	0	3	0.000	153	190	-37
Colombia	2	0	2	0.000	102	138	-36
Venezuela	2	0	2	0.000	99	137	-38

Brazil	42–38	Chile

San Jose de Cucuta

Brazil	84–60	Colombia

San Jose de Cucuta

Paraguay	58–39	Ecuador

San Jose de Cucuta

Peru	57–49	Chile

San Jose de Cucuta

Paraguay	50–42	Venezuela

San Jose de Cucuta

Peru	42–40	Ecuador

San Jose de Cucuta

Uruguay	87–57	Venezuela

San Jose de Cucuta

Uruguay	38–34	Ecuador

San Jose de Cucuta

Argentina	54–42	Colombia

San Jose de Cucuta

Brazil	57–40	Ecuador

San Jose de Cucuta

Paraguay	69–67	Chile

San Jose de Cucuta

Argentina	74–55	Peru

San Jose de Cucuta

== Final round ==
Team	Pts.	W	L	PCT	PF	PA	Diff
Uruguay	5	2	1	0.667	186	167	+19
Paraguay	5	2	1	0.667	165	162	+3
Brazil	4	1	2	0.333	154	156	-2
Argentina	4	1	2	0.333	152	172	-20

Paraguay	50–43	Brazil

San Jose de Cucuta

Brazil	63–35	Argentina

San Jose de Cucuta

Paraguay	53–50	Argentina

San Jose de Cucuta

Uruguay	61–48	Brazil

San Jose de Cucuta

Argentina	57–56	Uruguay

San Jose de Cucuta

Uruguay	69–62	Paraguay

San Jose de Cucuta

South American Basketball Championship 1955

Uruguay
seventh title

== Final standings ==
Place	Team
1	Uruguay
2	Paraguay
3	Brazil
4	Argentina
5	Peru
6	Chile
7	Ecuador
8	Colombia
9	Venezuela
