= 1930 South American Basketball Championship =

1st South American Basketball Championship

Tournament details
- Host country: Uruguay
- Dates: December 6-14
- Teams: 4
- Venue: 1 (in 1 host city)

Final positions
- Champions: Uruguay (1st title)

The 1930 South American Basketball Championship was the first edition of this regional tournament, the first major international basketball tournament. It is the earliest competition recognized by the International Basketball Federation, founded in 1932. It was held in Montevideo, Uruguay and won by the host nation.

== Final rankings ==
1. Uruguay
2. Argentina
3. Brazil
4. Chile

== Results ==
Each team played the other three teams twice apiece, for a total of six games played by each team.

Rank	Team	W	L	PF	PA	Diff
1	Uruguay	6	0	225	88	+137
2	Argentina	4	2	151	128	+23
3	Brazil	2	4	89	148	-59
4	Chile	0	6	92	193	-101

Uruguay	26–19	Argentina

Uruguay	33–11	Brazil

Uruguay	45–14	Chile

Argentina	33–18	Chile

Argentina	18–11	Brazil

Brazil	19–13	Chile

Argentina	16–36	Uruguay

Brazil	15–39	Uruguay

Chile	20–34	Argentina

Chile	13–46	Uruguay

Brazil	17–31	Argentina

Chile	14–16	Brazil
