= 1953 South American Basketball Championship =

15th South American Basketball Championship

Tournament details
- Host country: Uruguay
- Dates: April 4–19
- Teams: 7
- Venue: 1 (in 1 host city)

Final positions
- Champions: Uruguay (6th title)

The 1953 South American Basketball Championship was the 15th edition of this regional tournament. It was held in Montevideo, Uruguay and won by the host, Uruguay national basketball team. A record seven national teams competed. It was the first to follow the first World Championship in 1950.

== Final rankings ==
1. Uruguay
2. Brazil
3. Chile
4. Paraguay
5. Peru
6. Ecuador
7. Colombia

== Results ==
Each team played the other six teams once, for a total of six games played by each team and 21 overall in the preliminary round. The three-way tie between Chile, Peru, and Paraguay was broken by a sub-bracket; each was 1–1 against the other teams in that sub-bracket. The point differentials within the bracket gave Chile the top spot in it with +5, Paraguay had +4, and Peru had -9. This was mostly due to Chile's relatively large victory over Peru while the other two games (Peru-Paraguay and Chile-Paraguay) had both been much closer.

Rank	Team	Pts	W	L	PF	PA	Diff
1	Uruguay	12	6	0	309	200	+109
2	Brazil	11	5	1	274	222	+52
3	Chile	9	3	3	269	282	-13
4	Paraguay	9	3	3	287	284	+3
5	Peru	9	3	3	235	237	-2
6	Ecuador	7	1	5	259	310	-51
7	Colombia	6	0	6	241	339	-98

Uruguay	48 - 32	Brazil
Uruguay	52 - 36	Chile
Uruguay	62 - 45	Paraguay
Uruguay	22 - 20	Peru
Uruguay	58 - 34	Ecuador
Uruguay	67 - 33	Colombia
Brazil	51 - 40	Chile
Brazil	40 - 37	Paraguay
Brazil	31 - 15	Peru
Brazil	51 - 37	Ecuador
Brazil	69 - 45	Colombia
Chile	40 - 46	Paraguay
Chile	56 - 45	Peru
Chile	52 - 47	Ecuador
Chile	45 - 41	Colombia
Paraguay	51 - 53	Peru
Paraguay	57 - 43	Ecuador
Paraguay	51 - 46	Colombia
Peru	50 - 43	Ecuador
Peru	52 - 34	Colombia
Ecuador	55 - 42	Colombia
