= Gerardo Jauri =

Uruguayan basketball coach

Personal information
- Born: September 10, 1961 (age 65) Montevideo, Uruguay

Career information
- Playing career: 2002–present
- Position: Head coach

Career history
- 2002–2017: Defensor Sporting
- 2008–2011: Uruguay men's national basketball team (head coach)
- 2019–2022: Club Atlético Olimpia
- 2023–present: Uruguay men's national basketball team (head coach)

Gerardo Jauri (born 10 September 1961 in Montevideo) is a Uruguayan professional basketball coach and former player. Between 2002–2017, he led Defensor Sporting with one of the longest coaching tenures in Uruguayan sports. In 2023, he returned as head coach of the Uruguay men's national basketball team.

== Club coaching career ==
Jauri began his head coaching career at Defensor Sporting in 2002 after previously playing with the team.

During his 15 years with Defensor, he guided the team to eight finals, capturing multiple trophies: the Federal Championship (2003) and two Liga Uruguaya de Básquetbol championships (2003–04, 2009–10).

He stepped down in 2017, closing one of the longest coaching cycles in basketball in Uruguay.

== National team coaching ==
Jauri first worked with the Uruguay men's national basketball team from 2008 to 2012, participating in South American Championships and the FIBA Americas Championship, achieving a runner-up finish with the squad.

In June 2023, he was reappointed head coach by the Uruguayan Basketball Federation.

Under his leadership, Uruguay competed in the 2025 FIBA AmeriCup, recording a landmark victory over the USA. Jauri highlighted the growth of the team’s young core and emphasized preparation for future international competitions.
