= 1939 South American Basketball Championship =

7th South American Basketball Championship

Tournament details
- Host country: Brazil
- Dates: 14-30 April
- Teams: 5
- Venue: 1 (in 1 host city)

Final positions
- Champions: Brazil (1st title)

The 1939 South American Basketball Championship was the 7th edition of this tournament. It was held in Rio de Janeiro, Brazil and won by the host, Brazil national basketball team. 5 teams competed.

== Final rankings ==
1. Brazil
2. Uruguay
3. Argentina
4. Peru
5. Chile

== Results ==
Each team played the other four teams once, for a total of four games played by each team and 10 overall in the tournament.

Rank	Team	Pts	W	L	PF	PA	Diff
1	Brazil	8	4	0	139	120	+19
2	Uruguay	7	3	1	151	122	+29
3	Argentina	6	2	2	151	126	+25
4	Peru	5	1	3	129	132	-3
5	Chile	4	0	4	97	167	-70

Brazil	34 - 32	Uruguay
Brazil	31 - 30	Argentina
Brazil	32 - 25	Peru
Brazil	42 - 33	Chile
Uruguay	43 - 42	Argentina
Uruguay	34 - 29	Peru
Uruguay	42 - 17	Chile
Argentina	38 - 33	Peru
Argentina	41 - 19	Chile
Peru	42 - 28	Chile
