= 1940 South American Basketball Championship =

8th South American Basketball Championship

Tournament details
- Host country: Uruguay
- Dates: 20-28 January
- Teams: 6
- Venue(s): 1 (in 1 host city)

Final positions
- Champions: Uruguay (3rd title)

The 1940 South American Basketball Championship was the 8th edition of this tournament. It was held in Montevideo, Uruguay and won by the host, Uruguay national basketball team. A record 6 teams competed, including Paraguay in their first appearance, despite the World War that was currently under way.

== Final rankings ==
1. Uruguay
2. Argentina
3. Brazil
4. Chile
5. Peru
6. Paraguay

== Results ==
Each team played the other five teams once, for a total of five games played by each team and 15 overall in the tournament.

Rank	Team	Pts	W	L	PF	PA	Diff
1	Uruguay	10	5	0	192	101	+91
2	Argentina	9	4	1	177	106	+71
3	Brazil	8	3	2	135	156	-21
4	Chile	7	2	3	166	155	+11
5	Peru	6	1	4	149	146	+3
6	Paraguay	5	0	5	83	238	-155

Uruguay	25 - 23	Argentina
Uruguay	38 - 15	Brazil
Uruguay	43 - 26	Chile
Uruguay	25 - 24	Peru
Uruguay	61 - 13	Paraguay
Argentina	46 - 33	Brazil
Argentina	18 - 17	Chile
Argentina	40 - 26	Peru
Argentina	50 - 5	Paraguay
Brazil	36 - 31	Chile
Brazil	27 - 21	Peru
Brazil	24 - 20	Paraguay
Chile	35 - 32	Peru
Chile	57 - 26	Paraguay
Peru	46 - 19	Paraguay
