= 1932 South American Basketball Championship =

2nd South American Basketball Championship

Tournament details
- Host country: Chile
- Dates: 29 April - 14 May
- Teams: 3
- Venue: 1 (in 1 host city)

Final positions
- Champions: Uruguay (2nd title)

The 1932 South American Basketball Championship was the 2nd edition of this regional tournament. It was held in Santiago, Chile and won by Uruguay.

== Final rankings ==
1. Uruguay
2. Chile
3. Argentina

== Results ==
=== Preliminary round ===
Each team played the other two teams twice apiece, for a total of four games played by each team.

Rank	Team	W	L	PF	PA	Diff
1	Uruguay	3	1	83	71	+12
2	Chile	3	1	81	77	+4
3	Argentina	0	4	81	97	-16

Uruguay	21 - 19	Chile
Chile	14 - 13	Uruguay
Uruguay	31 - 25	Argentina
Argentina	13 - 18	Uruguay
Chile	27 - 24	Argentina
Argentina	19 - 21	Chile

Uruguay's loss to Chile was its first defeat; nevertheless it took the top seed in the preliminary round.

=== Final ===
As Uruguay and Chile finished level on points, a play-off match for the championship was required.

Uruguay	42 - 28	Chile

Uruguay won the final to claim its second South American title.
