= 1934 South American Basketball Championship =

3rd South American Basketball Championship

Tournament details
- Host country: Argentina
- Dates: 13-21 April
- Teams: 4
- Venue: 1 (in 1 host city)

Final positions
- Champions: Argentina (1st title)

The 1934 South American Basketball Championship was the 3rd edition of this regional tournament. It was held in Buenos Aires, Argentina and won by the host Argentina national basketball team. 4 teams competed.

== Final rankings ==
1. Argentina
2. Chile
3. Brazil
4. Uruguay

== Results ==
Each team played the other three teams twice apiece, for a total of six games played by each team. The top two teams after this round played each other one more time in the final.

Rank	Team	Pts	W	L	PF	PA	Diff
1	Argentina	12	6	0	153	104	+49
2	Chile	9	3	3	136	157	-21
3	Brazil	7	1	5	120	149	-29
4	Uruguay	5	2	4	72	71	+1

Argentina	26 - 25	Brazil
Brazil	25 - 29	Argentina
Argentina	43 - 26	Chile
Chile	20 - 35	Argentina
Argentina	18 - 8	Uruguay
Uruguay	0 - 2 (w/o)	Argentina
Brazil	29 - 32	Chile
Chile	31 - 17	Brazil
Uruguay	0 - 2 (w/o)	Chile
Chile	25 - 33	Uruguay
Uruguay	0 - 2 (w/o)	Brazil
Brazil	22 - 31	Uruguay
