= 1949 South American Basketball Championship =

14th South American Basketball Championship

Tournament details
- Host country: Paraguay
- Dates: 21 April - 7 May
- Teams: 6
- Venue(s): 1 (in 1 host city)

Final positions
- Champions: Uruguay (5th title)

The 1949 South American Basketball Championship was the 14th edition of this regional tournament. It was held in Asunción, Paraguay and won by the Uruguay national basketball team. 6 teams competed.

== Final rankings ==
1. Uruguay
2. Brazil
3. Chile
4. Peru
5. Argentina
6. Paraguay

== Results ==
Each team played the other five teams once, for a total of five games played by each team and 15 overall in the preliminary round. Ties in the standings were broken by head-to-head results, as only a tie for first would have resulted in a final match.

Rank	Team	Pts	W	L	PF	PA	Diff
1	Uruguay	10	5	0	161	134	+27
2	Brazil	8	3	2	188	178	+10
3	Chile	8	3	2	179	174	+5
4	Peru	7	2	3	178	162	+16
5	Argentina	7	2	3	188	187	+1
6	Paraguay	5	0	5	134	193	-59

Uruguay	34 - 26	Brazil
Uruguay	35 - 34	Chile
Uruguay	32 - 21	Peru
Uruguay	35 - 34	Argentina
Uruguay	25 - 19	Paraguay
Brazil	40 - 31	Chile
Brazil	32 - 30	Peru
Brazil	40 - 48	Argentina
Brazil	50 - 35	Paraguay
Chile	41 - 35	Peru
Chile	47 - 40	Argentina
Chile	26 - 24	Paraguay
Peru	37 - 29	Argentina
Peru	55 - 28	Paraguay
Argentina	37 - 28	Paraguay
