= Francisco de León (basketball) =

Puerto Rican basketball player

Personal information
- Nationality: Puerto Rican
- Born: 25 July 1961 (age 63); Guaynabo, Puerto Rico

Sport
- Sport: Basketball

Francisco de León (born 25 July 1961) is a Puerto Rican basketball player. He competed in the men's tournament at the 1988 Summer Olympics.
