= Álvaro Tito =

Uruguayan basketball player

Álvaro Tito Moreno (born 17 January 1962) is a Uruguayan former basketball player who competed in the 1984 Summer Olympics.
