= Ernesto Michel =

Argentine basketball player

Ernesto Federico Michel (born October 12, 1970 in Paraná, Entre Ríos) is a retired male basketball player (2.00 metres) from Argentina, who competed for his native country at the 1996 Summer Olympics in Atlanta, Georgia, finishing in ninth place in the overall-rankings. He was nicknamed "Nito" during his career.
