= 1935 South American Basketball Championship =

4th South American Basketball Championship

Tournament details
- Host country: Brazil
- Dates: 19-29 June
- Teams: 3
- Venue: 1 (in 1 host city)

Final positions
- Champions: Argentina (2nd title)

The 1935 South American Basketball Championship was the 4th edition of this regional tournament. It was held in Rio de Janeiro, Brazil and won by the host, Argentina national basketball team. 3 teams competed.

== Final rankings ==
1. Argentina
2. Brazil
3. Uruguay

== Results ==
Each team played the other two teams twice apiece, for a total of four games played by each team.

Rank	Team	Pts	W	L	PF	PA	Diff
1	Argentina	7	3	1	117	102	+15
2	Brazil	6	2	2	107	106	+1
3	Uruguay	5	1	3	107	123	-16

Argentina	28 - 23	Brazil
Brazil	30 - 20	Argentina
Argentina	33 - 19	Uruguay
Uruguay	30 - 36	Argentina
Brazil	29 - 27	Uruguay
Uruguay	31 - 25	Brazil
