= 1960 South American Basketball Championship =

18th South American Basketball Championship

Tournament details
- Host country: Argentina
- Dates: March 3-18
- Teams: 7
- Venue(s): 1 (in 1 host city)

Final positions
- Champions: Brazil (4th title)

The South American Basketball Championship 1960 was the 18th edition of this tournament. It was held from March 3 to March 18 in Córdoba, Argentina and won by the Brazil national basketball team. 7 teams competed.

== Results ==
Rank	Team	Pts	W	L	PF	PA	Diff
1	Brazil	12	6	0	441	360	+81
2	Paraguay	10	4	2	395	379	+16
3	Argentina	10	4	2	380	337	+43
4	Uruguay	9	3	3	478	388	+90
5	Chile	8	2	4	351	399	-48
6	Colombia	7	1	5	359	451	-92
7	Ecuador	7	1	5	339	429	-90

Brazil	89–67	Colombia

Chile	69–67	Paraguay

Argentina	71–38	Ecuador

Uruguay	86–60	Chile

Argentina	71–56	Colombia

Colombia	78–68	Ecuador

Brazil	71–64	Paraguay

Uruguay	87–63	Ecuador

Argentina	53–44	Chile

Paraguay	67–60	Ecuador

Brazil	73–45	Chile

Uruguay	94–49	Colombia

Paraguay	76–61	Argentina

Chile	76–57	Colombia

Brazil	81–80	Uruguay

Brazil	69–47	Ecuador

Argentina	67–65	Uruguay

Paraguay	53–52	Colombia

Ecuador	63–57	Chile

Paraguay	68–66	Uruguay

Brazil	58–57	Argentina
