= Hugo Vázquez =

Uruguayan basketball player (born 1968)

Hugo Vázquez (born 2 March 1968) is an Uruguayan former basketball player.
