= Washington Poyet =

Uruguayan basketball player

Washington Augusto Poyet Carreras (12 January 1939 – 16 June 2007) was a Uruguayan basketball player who competed in the 1960 Summer Olympics and in the 1964 Summer Olympics. He was the father of footballer Gus Poyet, and the grandfather of Diego Poyet.
