= Coliseo Eduardo Dibós =

Indoor arena in Lima, Peru

Coordinates: 12.111088°S 77.001028°W

Coliseo Eduardo Dibos
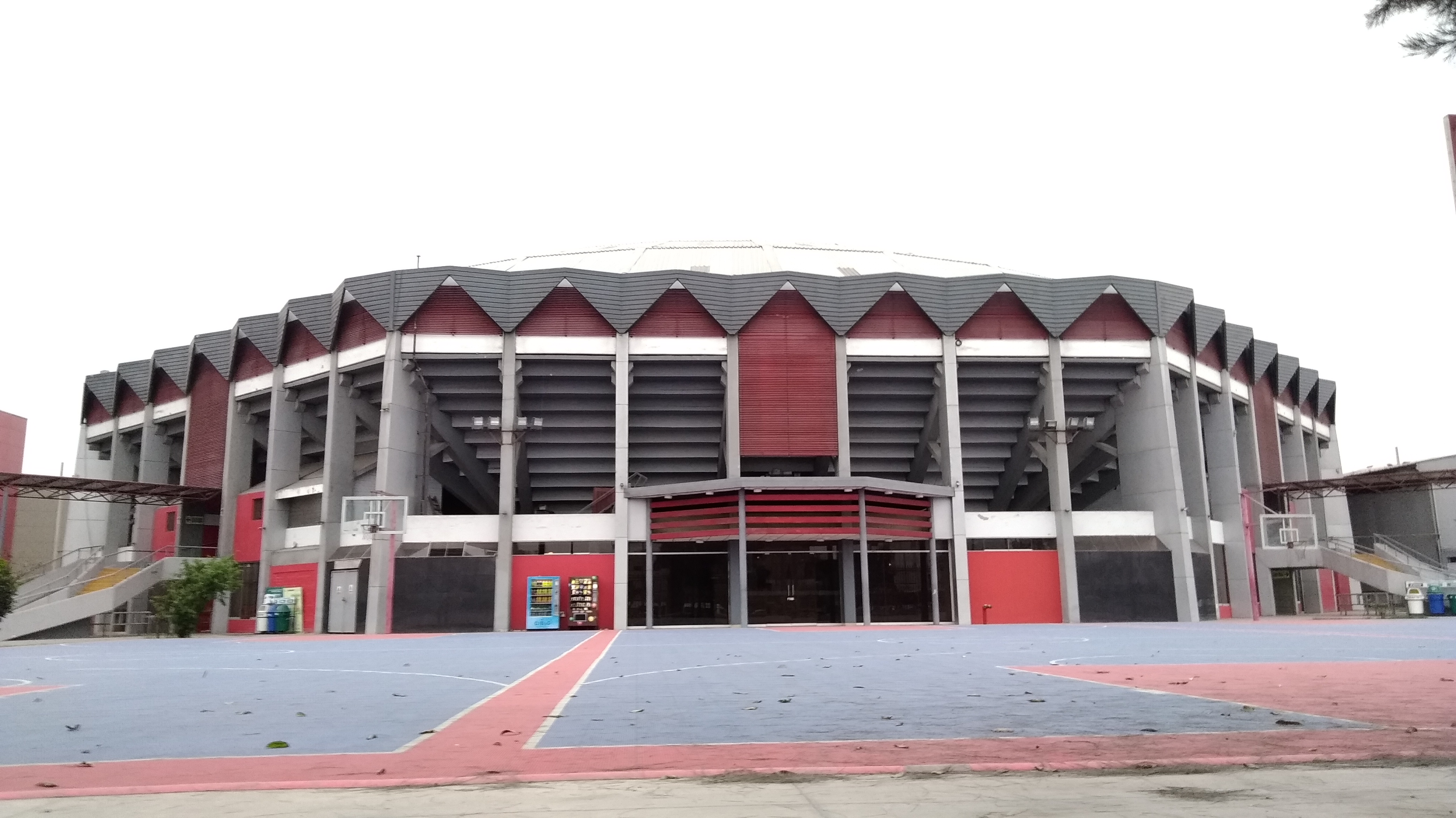
- Coliseo Eduardo Dibós in 2017 before its renovation.
- Interactive map of Coliseo Eduardo Dibos
- Location: Aviación and Angamos avenues, San Borja, Lima, Peru
- Owner: Peruvian Sports Institute
- Operator: Peruvian Sports Institute
- Capacity: 4,600

Construction
- Opened: 1989

Tenants
- Peru national basketball team Peru women's national volleyball team

The Coliseo Eduardo Dibos is a multi-purpose indoor arena located at the intersection of Angamos and Aviación avenues in San Borja, Lima, Peru. It is named after politician Eduardo Dibós Dammert, who served two times as mayor of Lima, from 1938 to 1940 and from 1950 to 1952.

== Overview ==
The arena has a capacity for 4,600 people. This arena is used to host sport events as volleyball and basketball, also many other secondary sports. It is also used for circus events and Bugs Bunny on Ice in August 2006. The Dibos Coliseum, with the Coliseo Mariscal Caceres, are the most important venues for non-football sports in Lima. This venue also hosts concerts as in 1994, when the Gaitán Castro brothers were the first Peruvian artists to sell out the arena for a concert. A boxing event sold out featuring the WBA world champion Kina Malpartida and Halana Dos Santos on 20 June 2009. It was remodelled to house the venue in the 3x3 basketball and the traditional 5x5 basketball competitions at the 2019 Pan American Games.
