= 1961 South American Basketball Championship =

19th South American Basketball Championship

Tournament details
- Host country: Brazil
- Dates: April 20-30
- Teams: 8
- Venue: 1 (in 1 host city)

Final positions
- Champions: Brazil (5th title)

The South American Basketball Championship 1961 was the 18th edition of this regional tournament. It was held from April 20 to April 30 in Rio de Janeiro, Brazil. Eight teams competed.

== Results ==
The final standings were determined by a round robin, where the 8 teams played against each other once.

align=center bgcolor=#efefef	Rank	Team	Pts	W	L	PF	PA	Diff
1	Brazil	14	7	0	576	356	+220
2	Uruguay	12	5	2	434	420	+37
3	Argentina	12	5	2	473	436	+14
4	Paraguay	11	4	3	462	448	+14
5	Peru	10	3	4	363	434	-71
6	Chile	9	2	5	408	446	-38
7	Ecuador	8	1	6	419	521	-74
8	Venezuela	8	1	6	372	446	-102

Paraguay	68–49	Venezuela

Ecuador	54–88	Brazil

Argentina	79–49	Peru

Chile	60–63	Uruguay

Venezuela	48–62	Peru

Paraguay	63–61	Uruguay

Argentina	83–70	Ecuador

Brazil	98–54	Chile

Brazil	84–63	Argentina

Venezuela	56–59	Ecuador

Uruguay	61–49	Peru

Paraguay	60–61	Chile

Uruguay	62–53	Venezuela

Brazil	74–35	Peru

Ecuador	61–86	Paraguay

Chile	49–51	Argentina

Venezuela	57–63	Argentina

Brazil	94–58	Paraguay

Uruguay	74–64	Ecuador

Peru	54–51	Chile

Peru	53–66	Paraguay

Uruguay	66–65	Argentina

Ecuador	56–73	Chile

Venezuela	45–72	Brazil

Chile	60–64	Venezuela

Argentina	69–61	Paraguay

Ecuador	55–61	Peru

Uruguay	47–66	Brazil
