= Joaquín Rodríguez (basketball) =

Uruguayan professional basketball player

No. 14 – Gran Canaria
- Position: Shooting guard / Point guard
- League: Primera FEB

Personal information
- Born: 14 June 1999 (age 27) Mercedes, Uruguay
- Listed height: 194 cm (6 ft 4 in)

Career information
- Playing career: 2017–present

Career history
- 2017–2018: Club Atlético Aguada
- 2018: Larre Borges
- 2018–2019: Aguada
- 2019–2020: Estudiantes Concordia
- 2020–2023: Obras Sanitarias
- 2023–2024: Real Betis Baloncesto
- 2024–2026: Casademont Zaragoza
- 2025: →Movistar Estudiantes
- 2026: Peñarol
- 2026–present: Gran Canaria

Joaquín Rodríguez (born 14 June 1999) is a Uruguayan professional basketball player for Gran Canaria of the Primera FEB. He is a member of the Uruguay men's national basketball team.

== Club career ==
Rodríguez began his professional career at Club Atlético Aguada in Uruguay (2017–18), interspersed with a brief stint at Larre Borges in 2018. He returned to Aguada for the 2018–19 season before moving to Estudiantes Concordia in Argentina for 2019–20. In 2020, he joined Obras Sanitarias, where he became a standout in the Basketball Champions League Americas, averaging double figures in points and rebounds.

In September 2023, Rodríguez signed with Real Betis Baloncesto of LEB Oro. He quickly became a key performer, notably recording a 34-point, 37-evaluation performance (including 7/8 three-point shooting) against Guuk Gipuzkoa Basket and earning multiple weekly MVP honors.

He then secured a move to ACB club Casademont Zaragoza in June 2024. He was loaned to Movistar Estudiantes in February 2025 for more playing time in Primera FEB. On July 12, 2026, Rodríguez signed with Gran Canaria of the Primera FEB.

== International career ==
Rodríguez debuted with the Uruguay senior national team during the 2019 FIBA Basketball World Cup qualification. He has since represented Uruguay at the 2019 Pan American Games, 2022 FIBA AmeriCup, and 2023 Olympic Pre-Qualifiers, averaging double-digit points and contributing in assists.
