= Federico Garcín =

Uruguayan basketball player (born 1973)

Federico Garcín (born 14 November 1973) is an Uruguayan former basketball player.
