= Martín Suárez (basketball) =

Uruguayan basketball player (born 1977)

Martín Suárez (born 20 April 1977) is an Uruguayan basketball player, currently playing for Cader in the Uruguayan second division. He plays as a small forward.
