= Adrián Laborda =

Uruguayan basketball player

Adrián Laborda (born 16 February 1972) is an Uruguayan former basketball player.

Adrián Laborda
Born: 16 February 1972
Position: Center
Height: 6'7.5"
