= Bolivia men's national basketball team =

Bolivia
- FIBA ranking: 108 (2 December 2025)
- Joined FIBA: 1947
- FIBA zone: FIBA Americas
- National federation: Federación Boliviana de Básquetbol (FBB)
- Nickname: Cóndores

Olympic Games
- Appearances: None

FIBA World Cup
- Appearances: None

FIBA AmeriCup
- Appearances: None
Home	Away

The Bolivia national basketball team is the national men's basketball team from Bolivia.

In June 2021, the Bolivians succeeded in their first undertaking for the 2023 FIBA Basketball World Cup qualification (Americas). They defeated Ecuador in two games by 91-57 (on aggregate). The home game was played at the Guadalquivir Coliseum in Tarija, where more than 2,000 people attended.

== Current squad ==
At the 2023 FIBA Basketball World Cup qualification (Americas):

Bolivia men's national basketball team roster
Players
Coaches

Pos.	No.	Name	Age – Date of birth	Height	Club	Ctr.
PG	1	Pedro Gutierrez	24 – 20 October 1996	1.76 m (5 ft 9 in)	Pichincha de Potosi	(Bolivia)
C	6	Oliver Harri	23 – 22 July 1997	2.02 m (6 ft 8 in)	Entretanto Meta La Salle Tarija	(Bolivia)
PF	7	Cristhian Camargo	28 – 14 November 1992	1.94 m (6 ft 4 in)	Club Nacional Potosi	(Bolivia)
G	8	Paolo Ramos	33 – 31 July 1987	1.90 m (6 ft 3 in)	Atletico Nacional	(Bolivia)
SF	9	Luis Choque	23 – 11 September 1997	1.98 m (6 ft 6 in)	CD Estudio	(Spain)
PG	10	Ronald Arze	28 – 22 May 1993	1.78 m (5 ft 10 in)	Pichincha de Potosi	(Bolivia)
F	11	Axel Veizaga	25 – 28 June 1996	1.82 m (6 ft 0 in)	Deportivo Calero	(Bolivia)
F	13	Diego Olguin	26 – 26 April 1995	1.87 m (6 ft 2 in)	Rubair Quillacollo	(Bolivia)
C	14	Luis Mercado	23 – 27 November 1997	2.08 m (6 ft 10 in)	Club Universidad Santa Cruz	(Bolivia)
SF	15	Martin Ochoa	26 – 18 November 1994	1.85 m (6 ft 1 in)	La Salle	(Bolivia)
F	23	Rene Calvo	28 – 19 May 1993	1.93 m (6 ft 4 in)	Pichincha de Potosi	(Bolivia)
G	24	Josh Reaves	24 – 4 June 1997	1.94 m (6 ft 4 in)	Rio Grande Valley Vipers	(United States)

Head coach

- (Bolivia) Giovanny Vargas

Assistant coaches

Legend

- Club – describes last
  club before the tournament
- Age – describes age
  on 16 July 2021

=== Depth chart ===
Pos.	Starting 5	Bench 1	Bench 2
C	Luis Mercado	Oliver Harri
PF	Cristhian Camargo	Axel Veizaga	Diego Olguin
SF	Rene Calvo	Luis Choque	Pedro Gutierrez
SG	Josh Reaves	Paolo Ramos
PG	Martin Ochoa	Ronald Arze

== South American Championship record ==
- 1943 : 6th
- 1963 : 9th
- 1977 : 9th
- 1989 : 9th
- 1997 : 10th
- 1999 : 10th
- 2001 : 10th
- 2012 : 7th
- 2016 : 8th

== Head coach position ==
- (Bolivia) Sandro Patino - 2012
- (Bolivia) Giovanny Vargas - 2019, 2021

== Past squads ==
At the 2016 South American Basketball Championship:

Bolivia men's national basketball team roster
Players
Coaches

Pos.	No.	Name	Age – Date of birth	Height	Club	Ctr.
C	4	Raul Salvatierra	24 – 15 July 1991	2.00 m (6 ft 7 in)	Caza y Pesca	(Bolivia)
F	5	Carlos Romero	32 – 20 May 1984	1.81 m (5 ft 11 in)	Pichincha	(Bolivia)
SG	6	Victor Fernandez	38 – 17 December 1977	1.83 m (6 ft 0 in)	La Salle Tarija	(Bolivia)
C	7	Cristhian Camargo	23 – 14 November 1992	1.94 m (6 ft 4 in)	UMSS	(Bolivia)
G	8	Paolo Ramos	28 – 31 August 1987	1.88 m (6 ft 2 in)	Universidad SC	(Bolivia)
F	9	Miguel Justiniano	35 – 27 August 1980	1.93 m (6 ft 4 in)	Amistad	(Bolivia)
G	10	Ronald Arze	23 – 22 June 1993	1.75 m (5 ft 9 in)	La Salle Olympic	(Bolivia)
G	11	Axel Veizaga	19 – 28 June 1996	1.82 m (6 ft 0 in)	UMSS	(Bolivia)
PF	12	Rene Calvo	23 – 19 May 1993	1.93 m (6 ft 4 in)	Pichincha	(Bolivia)
F	13	Diego Olguin	21 – 26 April 1995	1.86 m (6 ft 1 in)	UMSS	(Bolivia)
C	14	Luis Mercado	18 – 21 November 1997	2.06 m (6 ft 9 in)	Atletico Lanus	(Bolivia)
F	15	Martin Ochoa	21 – 18 November 1994	1.86 m (6 ft 1 in)	La Salle (basketball team)	(Bolivia)

Head coach

Assistant coaches

Legend

- Club – describes last
  club before the tournament
- Age – describes age
  on 26 June 2016

== Kit ==
=== Sponsor ===
2021: Entel

== See also ==
- Bolivia men's national under-17 basketball team
- Bolivia men's national under-15 basketball team
- Bolivia women's national basketball team
