= Diego Osella (basketball) =

Argentine basketball player

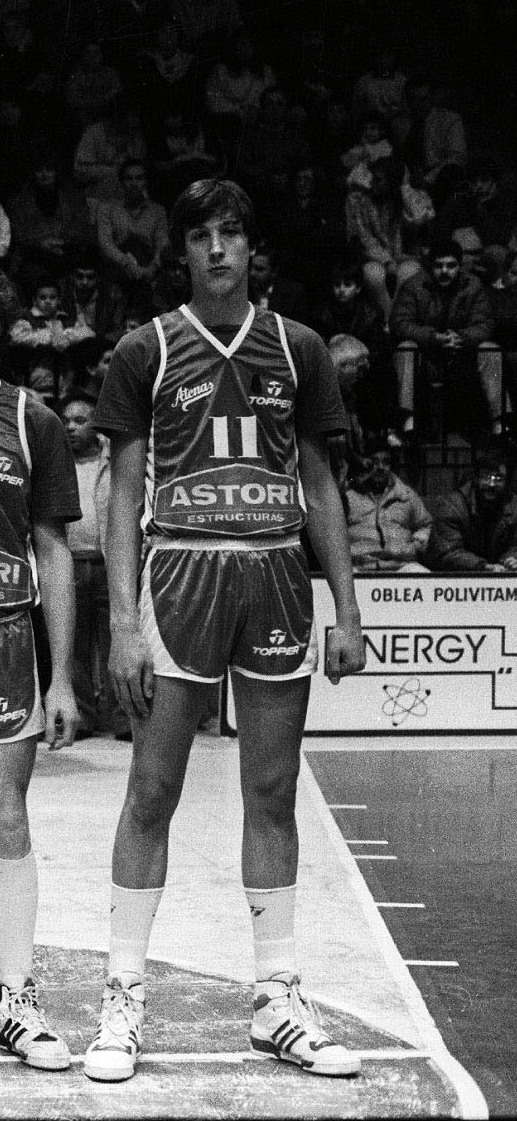
- Diego Osella, wearing the Atenas de Córdoba jersey

Personal information
- Born: September 4, 1969 (age 57) Oncativo, Córdoba, Argentina
- Listed height: 2.07 m (6 ft 9 in)

Career information
- Playing career: 1988–2011
- Position: Center

Career history
- 1988–1992: Atenas de Córdoba
- 1992–1993: Club Banco de Córdoba
- 1993–2000: Atenas de Córdoba
- 2000–2001: Lucentum Alicante
- 2001: Atenas de Córdoba
- 2001–2002: Estudiantes de Olavarría
- 2002–2003: Pallacanestro Varese
- 2003–2010: Atenas de Córdoba
- 2010–2011: Juventud Sionista

Career highlights
- Pan American Club Championship champion (1996); 3× FIBA South American League champion (1997, 1998, 2004); 2× South American Club Championship champion (1993, 1994); 6× Argentine League champion (1988, 1990, 1992, 1998, 1999, 2009); 9x Argentina League All Star (es) (1989, 1990, 1992, 1993, 1995, 1996, 1997, 1998, 1999); Argentine League Finals MVP (1999); NO. 11 jersey retired by Atenas
Medals
Men's basketball
Representing Argentina
Pan American Games
Gold medal – first place	1995 Mar del Plata
FIBA South American Championship
Gold medal – first place	2001 Valdivia

Diego Marcelo Osella (born September 4, 1969) is a retired Argentine professional basketball player.

== Professional career ==
Osella spent the majority of his career in Argentina with three brief spells in Spain and Italy. He was the Argentine League Finals MVP in 1999, while his featured in 9 Argentine All-Star Games (1989, 1990, 1992, 1993, 1995, 1996, 1997, 1998, 1999).

== National team career ==
With the senior Argentine national basketball team, Osella competed at the 1996 Summer Olympic Games in Atlanta, Georgia, where his team finished in ninth place in the overall-rankings. A year earlier, he helped claim Argentina's first ever gold medal in senior men's basketball, at the 1995 Pan American Games, after defeating the United States in the final, in Mar del Plata, Argentina.

== Titles ==
=== Clubs ===
- Liga Nacional de Básquet: 1988, 1990, 1991–92, 1997–98, 1998–99, 2008–09
- Campeonato Sudamericano de Clubes: 1993, 1994
- Campeonato Panamericano de Clubes: 1996
- Liga Sudamericana de Clubes: 1997, 1998, 2004

All club championships were won playing with Atenas.

=== National team ===
- Sudamericano Juvenil: 1988
- Pan American Games gold medal: 1995
- Sudamericano Mayores gold medal: 2001

== Personal honours ==
- Liga Nacional de Básquet Statistical Leaders:
  - Most games played in the Liga Nacional at the time he retired (1,096)
  - Most rebounds in the Liga Nacional (6,804).
  - Most blocks in the Liga Nacional (989).
  - 5th all-time top scorer in the Liga Nacional (12,358).
- Number 11 jersey retired by Atenas: (2011)
