= Gonzalo Caneiro =

Uruguayan former basketball player

Personal information
- Born: 1 December 1971 (age 53)
- Listed height: 181 cm (5 ft 11 in)

Career information
- Playing career: 19??–2011
- Position: Point guard
- Coaching career: 2011–present

Career history
- 1995–1999: Club Atlético Welcome
- 2000–2002: Cordón
- 2003–2004: Malvín
- 2005: Unión Atlética
- 2006–2007: Atenas
- 2008–2009: Tabaré
- 2010: Cordón
- 2011: Club Atlético Goes

Career highlights
- As player: 5× Uruguayan Basketball Championship (1997–1999, 2001, 2002)

Gonzalo Caneiro Ayarza (born 1 December 1971) is a Uruguayan basketball coach and former player who played for the Uruguay men's national basketball team. He won the Uruguayan Basketball Championship five times.
