= 1958 South American Basketball Championship =

17th South American Basketball Championship

Tournament details
- Host country: Chile
- Dates: January 24-February 11
- Teams: 8
- Venue: 1 (in 1 host city)

Final positions
- Champions: Brazil (3rd title)

The South American Basketball Championship 1958 was the 17th edition of this tournament. It was held from January 24 to February 11 in Santiago, Chile and won by the Brazil national basketball team. 8 teams competed.

== Results ==
Team	Pts.	W	L	PCT	PF	PA	Diff
Brazil	14	7	0	1.000	581	407	+174
Uruguay	13	6	1	0.857	445	398	+47
Paraguay	12	5	2	0.714	416	364	+52
Argentina	11	4	3	0.571	455	470	-15
Chile	10	3	4	0.429	389	376	+13
Colombia	9	2	5	0.286	433	499	-66
Peru	8	1	6	0.167	362	478	-116
Ecuador	7	0	7	0.000	360	449	-89

Uruguay	52–49	Colombia

Santiago

Paraguay	58–48	Ecuador

Santiago

Brazil	92–50	Peru

Santiago

Chile	75–59	Colombia

Santiago

Paraguay	50–42	Venezuela

Santiago

Uruguay	64–48	Ecuador

Santiago

Paraguay	67–53	Argentina

Santiago

Brazil	91–65	Colombia

Santiago

Argentina	71–55	Peru

Santiago

Brazil	57–40	Ecuador

Santiago

Brazil	91–65	Colombia

Santiago

Uruguay	60–58	Paraguay

Santiago

Chile	54–35	Peru

Santiago

Chile	54–47	Ecuador

Santiago

Colombia	63–54	Ecuador

Santiago

Paraguay	55–47	Chile

Santiago

Uruguay	71–63	Peru

Santiago

Brazil	84–67	Argentina

Santiago

Brazil	89–52	Ecuador

Santiago

Argentina	63–60	Chile

Santiago

Peru	59–58	Ecuador

Santiago

Argentina	81–72	Colombia

Santiago

Brazil	66–56	Uruguay

Santiago

Paraguay	72–45	Peru

Santiago

Paraguay	54–43	Chile

Santiago

Colombia	60–55	Peru

Santiago

Uruguay	79–58	Argentina

Santiago

Argentina	62–53	Ecuador

Santiago

Brazil	68–52	Paraguay

Santiago

Uruguay	63–56	Chile

Santiago
