= Marcel Bouzout =

Uruguayan basketball player (born 1971)

Marcel Bouzout Stefano (born March 2, 1971) is a retired male professional basketball player from Uruguay.

== Professional career ==
Bouzout was the Uruguayan League MVP, and Uruguayan League Finals MVP, in 2006.

== National team career ==
Bouzout played with the senior Uruguayan national basketball team in the 1990s, and the early 2000s (decade). He won two continental titles with the men's national squad (1995 and 1997) during his career.
