= Marcelo Capalbo =

Uruguayan basketball player and coach

Marcelo Capalbo (born 23 September 1970) is an Uruguayan basketball coach and former player, born in Montevideo.
