= Luis Pierri =

Uruguayan basketball player

Luis E. Pierri Barros (born 10 March 1963) is a Uruguayan former basketball player who competed in the 1984 Summer Olympics.
