= Diego Losada =

Uruguayan basketball player

Diego Losada (born 19 February 1972) is an Uruguayan former basketball player.
