= Ecuador men's national basketball team =

Ecuador
- FIBA ranking: 107 (3 March 2026)
- Joined FIBA: 1950
- FIBA zone: FIBA Americas

Olympic Games
- Appearances: None

FIBA World Cup
- Appearances: 1 (1950)
- Medals: None

FIBA AmeriCup
- Appearances: None
Home	Away

Ecuador national basketball team is the national men's basketball team from Ecuador who played in the 1950 FIBA World Championship where they came eighth.

== FIBA World Cup ==
- 1950: 8th place

== Pan American Games ==
- 1951: 9th place

== Current roster ==
At the 2016 South American Basketball Championship:

Ecuador men's national basketball team roster
Players
Coaches

Pos.	No.	Name	Age – Date of birth	Height	Club	Ctr.
G	4	Luis Riascos	16 – 29 March 2000	1.94 m (6 ft 4 in)	Halcones	(Colombia)
PG	5	Christian Orozco	22 – 24 April 1994	1.85 m (6 ft 1 in)	U.T.E	(Ecuador)
PF	6	Alexander Guerra	20 – 24 January 1996	1.96 m (6 ft 5 in)	Juvenil
PG	7	Paul Cano	30 – 11 May 1986	1.70 m (5 ft 7 in)	CKT	(Ecuador)
C	8	Carlos Delgado	26 – 21 March 1990	2.02 m (6 ft 8 in)	CKT	(Ecuador)
F	9	Martin Martinez	20 – 7 October 1995	1.82 m (6 ft 0 in)	CKT
G	10	William Guayaquil	23 – 27 April 1993	1.85 m (6 ft 1 in)	U.T.E	(Ecuador)
F	11	Jonathan Arboleda	21 – 26 February 1995	1.90 m (6 ft 3 in)	H.R. Portviejo
PF	12	Erick Cobena	19 – 13 September 1996	1.94 m (6 ft 4 in)	H.R. Portviejo
PF	13	Nixon Mina	26 – 16 January 1990	2.05 m (6 ft 9 in)	Importadora Alvarado	(Ecuador)
C	14	Eduard Caicedo	25 – 26 November 1990	1.98 m (6 ft 6 in)	U.T.E	(Ecuador)
C	15	Carlos Carcelen	35 – 29 May 1981	2.01 m (6 ft 7 in)	U.T.E	(Ecuador)

Head coach

- (Argentina) Luciano Martinez

Assistant coaches

Legend

- Club – describes last
  club before the tournament
- Age – describes age
  on 26 June 2016
