= List of Chile men's national basketball team rosters =

These are squads of the Chilean national basketball team at international tournaments:

1936 Olympic Games: finished 10th among 21 teams

Luis Carrasco, Augusto Carvacho, José González, Eusebio Hernández, Luis Ibaseta, Eduardo Kapstein Suckel, Michel Mehech

1948 Olympic Games: finished 6th among 23 teams

Eduardo Cordero Fernández, Ezequiel Figueroa Reyes, Juan José Gallo Chinchilla, Roberto Hammer Casadio, Eduardo Kapstein Suckel, Manuel Ledesma Barrales, Víctor Mahana Badrie, Luis Enrique Marmentini Gil, Andrés Mitrovic Guic, Antonio Moreno Rodillo, Eduardo Parra Rojas, Hermán Raffo Abarca, Marcos Sánchez Carmona, Guillermo Verdugo Yañez

1950 World Championship: finished 3rd among 10 teams

Rufino Bernedo, Víctor Mahana, Pedro Araya, Luis Enrique Marmentini Gil, Exequiel Figueroa, Juan José Gallo, Marcos Sánchez Carmona, Eduardo Cordero Fernández, Hernán Ramos, Raul Emilio López, Juan Ostoic, Mariano Fernández (Head Coach: Kenneth Davidson)

1952 Olympic Games: finished 5th among 23 teams

Pedro Araya Zabala, Rufino Bernedo, Eduardo Cordero Fernández, Hugo Fernández Diez, Ezequiel Figueroa Reyes, Juan José Gallo Chinchilla, Víctor Mahana Badrie, Eric Mahn Godoy, Juan Ostoic, Hermán Raffo Abarca, Hermán Ramos Muñoz, Álvaro Salvadores, Orlando Silva Infante

1954 World Championship: finished 10th among 12 teams

Pedro Araya, Víctor Mahana, Hernán Raffo, Juan Zitko, Raul Emilio López, Juan Ostoic, Antonio Torres, Milenko Skoknic, Raúl Urra, Rolando Etchepare, Dante Gianoni, Salomón Awad (Head Coach: Kenneth Davidson)

1956 Olympic Games: finished 8th among 15 teams

Hernán Raffo, Juan Ostoic, Luis Salvadores, Maximiliano Garafulic, Orlando Etcheberrigaray, Orlando Silva, Pedro Araya, Raúl Urra, Rolando Etchepare, Rufino Bernedo, Victor Mahaña (Head Coach: Juan Arredondo)

1959 World Championship: finished 3rd among 13 teams

Rufino Bernedo, Luis Salvadores, Juan Zitko, Rolando Etchepare, Orlando Silva, Orlando Etcheberrigaray, Juan Guillermo Thompson, José de la Fuente, Maximiliano Garafulic, Dante Gianoni, Bruno Luchsinger, Domingo Sibilla (Head Coach: Luis Valenzuela)

Roster for 2014 FIBA South American Championship.

#	Position	Name	Date of birth	Height	Club
4	G	Sebastián Sáez	1984	1.90 m	Deportivo Español de Talca
5	F	Jorge Schuler	1987	1.99 m	CD Boston College Santiago
6	PG	Franco Morales	1992	1.78 m	Bucaros
7	G	Sebastián Suárez	1991	1.93 m	Portland State University
8	PG	Pedro Sandoval	1989	1.75 m	Deportes Ancud
9	PG	Erick Carrasco	1983	1.81 m	CD Boston College Santiago
10	F	Juan Fontena	1987	1.96 m	CD Castro
11	C/F	Renato Vera	1987	1.99 m	Osorno Básquetbol
12	F	Gerardo Isla	1991	2.01 m	Columbia College of Missouri
13	C	Jorge Valencia	1977	2.06 m	CD Boston College Santiago
14	F/C	José del Solar	1990	1.95 m	Osorno Básquetbol
15	C	Cristóbal Infante	1988	2.01 m	Los Leones de Quilpue

At the 2016 South American Basketball Championship:

Chile men's national basketball team roster
Players
Coaches

Pos.	No.	Name	Age – Date of birth	Height	Club	Ctr.
PG	4	Tomas Alvarez	26 – 21 July 1989	1.86 m (6 ft 1 in)	Leones de Quilpue	(Chile)
PF	5	Ignacio Carrion	22 – 6 October 1993	2.01 m (6 ft 7 in)	Leones de Quilpue	(Chile)
PG	6	Pablo Coro	26 – 19 April 1990	1.85 m (6 ft 1 in)	CD Valdivia	(Chile)
SF	7	Sebastian Herrera	18 – 1 November 1997	1.89 m (6 ft 2 in)	Gladiators Trier	(Germany)
F	8	Carlos Aranda	24 – 8 March 1992	1.90 m (6 ft 3 in)	Club Deportes Las Animas	(Chile)
G	9	Erik Carrasco	33 – 18 May 1983	1.80 m (5 ft 11 in)	CD Valdivia	(Chile)
F	10	Sebastian Suarez	25 – 1 March 1991	1.85 m (6 ft 1 in)	CD Valdivia	(Chile)
C	11	Cristobal Infante	27 – 15 December 1988	1.92 m (6 ft 4 in)	Asociacion Basquetbol Ancud	(Chile)
PF	12	Gerardo Isla	25 – 9 May 1991	1.98 m (6 ft 6 in)	CD Valdivia	(Chile)
G	12	Fernando Schuler	25 – 26 January 1991	1.75 m (5 ft 9 in)	Colo Colo Santiago	(Chile)
C	14	Nicolas Carvacho	19 – 24 January 1997	2.08 m (6 ft 10 in)	Colorado State Rams men's basketball	(United States)
C	15	Juan Fontena	29 – 15 February 1987	1.95 m (6 ft 5 in)	Deportes Castro	(Chile)

Head coach

- (Chile) Claudio Jorquera

Assistant coaches

Legend

- Club – describes last
  club before the tournament
- Age – describes age
  on 26 June 2016

At 2020 FIBA AmeriCup Qualifiers:

Chile men's national basketball team roster
Players
Coaches

Pos.	No.	Name	Age – Date of birth	Height	Club	Ctr.
SF	5	Ignacio Carrion	19 – 26 March 2001	2.02 m (6 ft 8 in)	Colegio Los Leones de Quilpué	(Chile)
SG	6	Carlos Lauler	23 – 31 May 1996	1.90 m (6 ft 3 in)	C.D. Universidad de Concepción Básquetbol	(Chile)
SF	7	Sebastian Herrera	22 – 1 November 1997	1.93 m (6 ft 4 in)	Crailsheim Merlins	(Germany)
G	8	Marcelo Perez	20 – 25 April 1999	1.96 m (6 ft 5 in)	Barry Buccaneers	(United States)
G	9	Franco Morales	27 – 30 June 1992	1.79 m (5 ft 10 in)	Las Ánimas de Valdivia	(Chile)
G	10	Sebastian Suarez	29 – 1 March 1991	1.93 m (6 ft 4 in)	Asociacion Basquetbol Ancud	(Chile)
F	15	Juan Fontena	33 – 15 February 1987	1.96 m (6 ft 5 in)	Deportes Castro	(Chile)
G	17	Sebastian Silva	24 – 12 March 1996	1.87 m (6 ft 2 in)	Club Deportivo Universidad Católica (sports club)	(Chile)
PF	20	Gerardo Isla	28 – 9 May 1991	2.01 m (6 ft 7 in)	CD Valdivia	(Chile)
G	30	Diego Silva	26 – 5 June 1993	1.86 m (6 ft 1 in)	C.D. Universidad de Concepción Básquetbol	(Chile)

Head coach

- (Argentina) Christian Santander

Assistant coaches

- (Argentina) Carlos Alberto Duro

Legend

- Club – describes last
  club before the tournament
- Age – describes age
  on 23 February 2020
