= Chile at the 1952 Summer Olympics =

- IOC code: CHI
- NOC: Chilean Olympic Committee

in Helsinki
- Competitors: 59 (55 men and 4 women) in 9 sports
- Flag bearer: Adriana Millard
- Medals Ranked 31st: Gold 0 Silver 2 Bronze 0 Total 2

Summer Olympics appearances (overview)
- 1896; 1900–1908; 1912; 1920; 1924; 1928; 1932; 1936; 1948; 1952; 1956; 1960; 1964; 1968; 1972; 1976; 1980; 1984; 1988; 1992; 1996; 2000; 2004; 2008; 2012; 2016; 2020; 2024

Chile at the 1952 Summer Olympics in Helsinki, Finland was the nation's ninth appearance out of twelfth editions of the Summer Olympic Games. The nation was represented by a team of 59 athletes, 55 males and 4 females, that competed in 33 events in 9 sports. This edition marked Chile's second and third Olympic medals, both silver medals in the individual and team show jumping competition of the equestrian event.

== Medalists ==
Medal	Name	Sport	Event
Silver	Óscar Cristi	Equestrian	Jumping Individual Competition
Silver	Ricardo Echeverría; Óscar Cristi; César Mendoza	Equestrian	Jumping Team Competition

== Athletics ==
Key

- Note–Ranks given for track events are within the athlete's heat only
- Q = Qualified for the next round

Men
Track & road events

Athlete	Event	Heat		Quarterfinal		Semifinal		Final	
Athlete	Event	Result	Rank	Result	Rank	Result	Rank	Result	Rank
Gustavo Ehlers	200 m	DNS		Did not advance					
Gustavo Ehlers	400 m	DNS		Did not advance					
Hugo Nutini	800 m	DNS		—N/a		Did not advance			
Hugo Nutini	1500 m	DNS		—N/a		Did not advance			
Guillermo Solá	1500 m	DNS		—N/a		Did not advance			
Raúl Inostroza	5000 m	DNS		—N/a				Did not advance	
Raúl Inostroza	10,000 m	—N/a						31:28.6	23
Edmundo Ohaco	110 m hurdles	15.4	5	—N/a		Did not advance			
Jörn Gevert	110 m hurdles	15.2	3	—N/a		Did not advance			
Jörn Gevert	400 m hurdles	56.1	5	Did not advance					
Pedro Yoma	400 m hurdles	56.8	4	Did not advance					
Guillermo Solá	3000 m steeplechase	9:32.2	10	—N/a				Did not advance	
Luis Celedón	Marathon	—N/a						2:33:45.8	14
Raúl Inostroza	Marathon	—N/a						DNF	

Field events

Athlete	Event	Qualification		Final	
Athlete	Event	Result	Rank	Result	Rank
Ernesto Lagos	High jump	1.80	32	Did not advance	
Carlos Vera	Long jump	7.07	14	Did not advance	
Hernán Haddad	Discus throw	42.89	28	Did not advance	
Arturo Melcher	Hammer throw	45.55	32	Did not advance	

Combined events – Decathlon

Athlete	Event	100 m	LJ	SP	HJ	400 m	110H	DT	PV	JT	1500 m	Final	Rank
Hernán Figueroa	Result	11.73	6.38	12.87	1.60	52.8	16.4	38.08	3.50	51.22	4:58.2	5592	17
Hernán Figueroa	Points	678	608	660	555	654	523	574	516	550	274	5592	17
Carlos Vera	Result	11.28	6.96	9.52	1.75	DNF						DNF	
Carlos Vera	Points	870	773	387	711	DNF						DNF	
Edmond Ohaco	Result	DNS										DNS	
Edmond Ohaco	Points	DNS										DNS	

Women
Track & road events

Athlete	Event	Heat		Quarterfinal		Semifinal		Final	
Athlete	Event	Result	Rank	Result	Rank	Result	Rank	Result	Rank
Adriana Millard	100 m	DNS		Did not advance					
Adriana Millard	200 m	25.4	4	—N/a		Did not advance			
Marion Huber	80 m hurdles	DNF		—N/a		Did not advance			

Field events

Athlete	Event	Qualification		Final	
Athlete	Event	Result	Rank	Result	Rank
Adriana Millard	Long jump	5.49	15	5.59	13
Gerda Martín	Javelin throw	36.94	18	Did not advance	
Edith Thomas	Javelin throw	No mark		Did not advance	

== Basketball ==
=== Men's team competition ===
- Main Round (Group D)
  - Defeated Cuba (53–52)
  - Defeated Egypt (74–46)
  - Lost to France (43–52)
- Final Round (Group B)
  - Lost to Brazil (44–75)
  - Lost to United States (55–103)
  - Lost to Soviet Union (60–78)
- Classification Matches
  - 5th/8th place: Defeated Bulgaria (60–53)
  - 5th/6th place: Defeated Brazil (58–49) → Fifth place
- Team Roster
  - Pedro Araya Zabala
  - Rufino Bernedo Zorzano
  - Eduardo Cordero Fernández
  - Hugo Fernández Diez
  - Exequiel Figueroa Reyes
  - Juan Gallo Chinchilla
  - Erich Mahn Godoy
  - Victor Mahana Badrie
  - Juan Ostoic Ostoic
  - Hernán Ramos Muñoz
  - Alvaro Salvadores Salvi
  - Hernán Raffo Abarca
  - Orlando Silva Infante

== Cycling ==
=== Road Competition ===
Men's Individual Road Race (190.4 km)

- Hernán Masanés – did not finish (→ no ranking)
- Héctor Droguett – did not finish (→ no ranking)
- Héctor Mellado – did not finish (→ no ranking)
- Hugo Miranda – did not finish (→ no ranking)

=== Track Competition ===
Men's 1.000m Time Trial

- Hernán Masanés
  - Final – 1:15.9 (→ 17th place)

Men's 1.000m Sprint Scratch Race

- Hernán Masanés – 14th place

== Modern pentathlon ==
Three male pentathletes represented Chile in 1952.

Individual

- Nilo Floody
- Hernán Fuentes
- Luis Carmona

Team

- Nilo Floody
- Hernán Fuentes
- Luis Carmona

== Rowing ==
Chile had one male rowers participate in one out of seven rowing events in 1952.

Men's single sculls

- Carlos Adueza

== Shooting ==
Two shooters represented Chile in 1952.

50 m pistol

- Enrique Ojeda

50 m rifle, three positions

- Juan Bizama

50 m rifle, prone

- Juan Bizama

== Swimming ==
Men

Rank given is within the heat.

Athlete	Event	Heat		Semifinal		Final	
Athlete	Event	Time	Rank	Time	Rank	Time	Rank
Hernán Avilés	100 m freestyle	1:02.8	6	Did not advance			
