= Chile at the 1956 Summer Olympics =

- IOC code: CHI
- NOC: Chilean Olympic Committee

in Melbourne/Stockholm
- Competitors: 33 (31 men and 2 women) in 8 sports
- Flag bearer: Marlene Ahrens
- Medals Ranked 27th: Gold 0 Silver 2 Bronze 2 Total 4

Summer Olympics appearances (overview)
- 1896; 1900–1908; 1912; 1920; 1924; 1928; 1932; 1936; 1948; 1952; 1956; 1960; 1964; 1968; 1972; 1976; 1980; 1984; 1988; 1992; 1996; 2000; 2004; 2008; 2012; 2016; 2020; 2024

Chile at the 1956 Summer Olympics in Melbourne, Australia was the nation's tenth appearance out of thirteen editions of the Summer Olympic Games. The nation was represented by a team of 33 athletes, 31 males and 2 females, that competed in 22 events in 8 sports. This edition marked Chile's 4 through 7 medals, two each in the silver and bronze categories.

== Medalists ==
Medal	Name	Sport	Event
Silver	Marlene Ahrens	Athletics	Women's Javelin Throw
Silver	Ramón Tapia	Boxing	Men's Middleweight
Bronze	Claudio Barrientos	Boxing	Men's Bantamweight
Bronze	Carlos Lucas	Boxing	Men's Light Heavyweight

== Athletics ==
Men's Marathon

- Eduardo Fontecilla — did not finish (→ no ranking)
- Eduardo Silva — did not finish (→ no ranking)

== Basketball ==
Preliminary Round, Group D

23 November 1956 1	Chile	59–78	Brazil	Melbourne
20:00	Scoring by half: 34–39, 25–39
	Pts: Bernedo 23	Boxscore	Pts: Wlamir 27	Arena: Royal Exhibition Building

26 November 1956 2	Chile	78–56	Australia	Melbourne
13:30	Scoring by half: 37–27, 41–29
	Pts: Bernedo 18	Boxscore	Pts: Dancis 19	Arena: Royal Exhibition Building

Quarter-finals, Group A

27 November 1956 1	France	71–60	Chile	Melbourne
15:00	Scoring by half: 37–23, 34–37
	Pts: Beugnot 20	Boxscore	Pts: Etchepare 19	Arena: Royal Exhibition Building

28 November 1956 2	Uruguay	80–73	Chile	Melbourne
15:00	Scoring by half: 40–25, 40–48
	Pts: Moglia 31	Boxscore	Pts: Ostoic 12	Arena: Royal Exhibition Building

29 November 1956 3	Chile	88–69	Philippines	Melbourne
16:30	Scoring by half: 42–32, 46–37
	Pts: Silva 28	Boxscore	Pts: Genato 12	Arena: Royal Exhibition Building

5th–8th place classification

30 November 1956 Semifinals	Chile	64–89	Brazil	Melbourne
15:00	Scoring by half: 33–55, 31–34
	Pts: Ostoic 13	Boxscore	Pts: dos Santos 27	Arena: Royal Exhibition Building

1 December 1956 7th place match	Chile	68–75	Philippines	Melbourne
15:00	Scoring by half: 38–33, 30–42
	Pts: Bernedo 14	Boxscore	Pts: Loyzaga 27	Arena: Royal Exhibition Building

== Cycling ==
Sprint

- Hernán Masanés — 11th place

Time trial

- Hernán Masanés — 1:14.7 (→ 14th place)

Individual road race

- Juan Pérez — 5:25:38 (→ 21st place)

== Diving ==
Men

Athlete	Event	Preliminary		Final			
Athlete	Event	Points	Rank	Points	Rank	Total	Rank
Günther Mund	3 m springboard	80.54	7 Q	56.99	6	137.53	7
Günther Mund	10 m platform	63.01	19	Did not advance			

Women

Athlete	Event	Preliminary		Final	
Athlete	Event	Points	Rank	Points	Rank
Lilo Mund	3 m springboard	DNF		Did not advance	

== Modern pentathlon ==
Three male pentathletes represented Chile in 1956.

Individual

- Gerardo Cortes, Sr.
- Nilo Floody
- Héctor Carmona

Team

- Gerardo Cortes, Sr.
- Nilo Floody
- Héctor Carmona

== Rowing ==
Chile had three male rowers participate in one out of seven rowing events in 1956.

Men's coxed pair

- Juan Carmona
- Jorge Contreras
- Eusebio Ojeda (cox)

== Shooting ==
Three shooters represented Chile in 1956.

25 m pistol

- Eliazar Guzmán
- Ignacio Cruzat

50 m pistol

- Ignacio Cruzat
- Rigoberto Fontt
