= South American Basketball Championship =

Basketball competition in South America

- Most recent season or competition: 2016 South American Basketball Championship
- Sport: Basketball
- Founded: 1930
- First season: 1930
- No. of teams: 10
- Country: South American countries
- Continent: South America
- Most recent champion: Venezuela (3rd title)
- Most titles: Brazil (18 titles)
- Related competitions: FIBA AmeriCup
- Website: FIBAAmericas.com

The South American Basketball Championship, or FIBA South American Championship, was the main FIBA tournament for men's national teams from South America's region of FIBA Americas. The tournament was first played in 1930. The tournament often has been played biannually, but the last took place in 2016 as the 2018 edition in Osorno, Chile was cancelled. It has been largely supplanted by the FIBA AmeriCup.

== Results ==
Year	Hosts	Gold medal game			Bronze medal game		
Year	Hosts	Gold	Score	Silver	Bronze	Score	Fourth place
1930; Details	Uruguay (Montevideo)	Uruguay	Round Robin	Argentina	Brazil	Round Robin	Chile
1932; Details	Chile (Santiago)	Uruguay	42–28	Chile	Argentina	N/A	None
1934; Details	Argentina (Buenos Aires)	Argentina	Round Robin	Chile	Brazil	Round Robin	Uruguay
1935; Details	Brazil (Rio de Janeiro)	Argentina	Round Robin	Brazil	Uruguay	N/A	None
1937; Details	Chile (Santiago & Valparaíso)	Chile	Round Robin	Uruguay	Brazil	Round Robin	Peru
1938; Details	Peru (Lima)	Peru	Round Robin	Argentina	Uruguay	Round Robin	Brazil
1939; Details	Brazil (Rio de Janeiro)	Brazil	Round Robin	Uruguay	Argentina	Round Robin	Peru
1940; Details	Uruguay (Montevideo)	Uruguay	Round Robin	Argentina	Brazil	Round Robin	Chile
1941; Details	Argentina (Mendoza)	Argentina	Round Robin	Peru	Uruguay	Round Robin	Chile
1942; Details	Chile (Santiago)	Argentina	Round Robin	Uruguay	Chile	Round Robin	Brazil
1943; Details	Peru (Lima)	Argentina	Round Robin	Uruguay	Peru	Round Robin	Chile
1945; Details	Ecuador (Guayaquil)	Brazil	Round Robin	Uruguay	Argentina	Round Robin	Chile
1947; Details	Brazil (Rio de Janeiro)	Uruguay	Round Robin	Brazil	Chile	Round Robin	Ecuador
1949; Details	Paraguay (Asunción)	Uruguay	Round Robin	Brazil	Chile	Round Robin	Peru
1953; Details	Uruguay (Montevideo)	Uruguay	Round Robin	Brazil	Chile	Round Robin	Paraguay
1955; Details	Colombia (Cúcuta)	Uruguay	Round Robin	Paraguay	Brazil	Round Robin	Argentina
1958; Details	Chile (Santiago)	Brazil	Round Robin	Uruguay	Paraguay	Round Robin	Argentina
1960; Details	Argentina (Córdoba)	Brazil	Round Robin	Paraguay	Argentina	Round Robin	Uruguay
1961; Details	Brazil (Rio de Janeiro)	Brazil	Round Robin	Uruguay	Argentina	Round Robin	Paraguay
1963; Details	Peru (Lima)	Brazil	Round Robin	Peru	Uruguay	Round Robin	Argentina
1966; Details	Argentina (Mendoza & San Juan)	Argentina	Round Robin	Brazil	Peru	Round Robin	Uruguay
1968; Details	Paraguay (Asunción)	Brazil	Round Robin	Uruguay	Peru	Round Robin	Paraguay
1969; Details	Uruguay (Montevideo)	Uruguay	Round Robin	Brazil	Argentina	Round Robin	Peru
1971; Details	Uruguay (Montevideo)	Brazil	Round Robin	Uruguay	Argentina	Round Robin	Peru
1973; Details	Colombia (Bogotá)	Brazil	Round Robin	Argentina	Peru	Round Robin	Uruguay
1976; Details	Colombia (Medellín)	Argentina	Round Robin	Brazil	Uruguay	Round Robin	Paraguay
1977; Details	Chile (Valdivia)	Brazil	Round Robin	Uruguay	Argentina	Round Robin	Venezuela
1979; Details	Argentina (Bahía Blanca)	Argentina	Round Robin	Brazil	Uruguay	Round Robin	Chile
1981; Details	Uruguay (Montevideo)	Uruguay	Round Robin	Brazil	Argentina	Round Robin	Chile
1983; Details	Brazil (São José dos Campos)	Brazil	Round Robin	Argentina	Uruguay	Round Robin	Venezuela
1985; Details	Colombia (Medellín)	Brazil	Round Robin	Uruguay	Argentina	Round Robin	Venezuela
1987; Details	Paraguay (Asunción)	Argentina	Round Robin	Venezuela	Brazil	Round Robin	Uruguay
1989; Details	Ecuador (Machala & Guayaquil)	Brazil	Round Robin	Argentina	Uruguay	Round Robin	Venezuela
1991; Details	Venezuela (Valencia)	Venezuela	122–121	Brazil	Argentina	Round Robin	Uruguay
1993; Details	Brazil (Guaratinguetá)	Brazil	82–76	Argentina	Venezuela	–	Uruguay
1995; Details	Uruguay (Montevideo)	Uruguay	89–74	Argentina	Brazil	85–63	Venezuela
1997; Details	Venezuela (Maracaibo)	Uruguay	Round Robin	Venezuela	Argentina	Round Robin	Brazil
1999; Details	Argentina (Bahía Blanca)	Brazil	73–67	Argentina	Venezuela	99–77	Uruguay
2001; Details	Chile (Valdivia)	Argentina	76–69	Brazil	Venezuela	94–90	Uruguay
2003; Details	Uruguay (Montevideo)	Brazil	83–80	Argentina	Uruguay	88–82	Venezuela
2004; Details	Brazil (Campos dos Goytacazes)	Argentina	95–78	Brazil	Venezuela	76–74	Uruguay
2006; Details	Venezuela (Caracas)	Brazil	92–61	Uruguay	Argentina	95–78	Venezuela
2008; Details	Chile (Puerto Montt)	Argentina	100–95	Uruguay	Venezuela	87–72	Brazil
2010; Details	Colombia (Neiva)	Brazil	87–77	Argentina	Uruguay	76–70	Venezuela
2012; Details	Argentina (Resistencia)	Argentina	79–56	Venezuela	Uruguay	80–68	Brazil
2014; Details	Venezuela (Isla Margarita)	Venezuela	74–65	Argentina	Brazil	66–61	Uruguay
2016; Details	Venezuela (Caracas)	Venezuela	64–58	Brazil	Uruguay	87–83	Argentina

== Performance by nation ==
Rank	Nation	Gold	Silver	Bronze	Total
1	Brazil	18	13	8	39
2	Argentina	13	12	13	38
3	Uruguay	11	13	12	36
4	Venezuela	3	3	5	11
5	Chile	1	2	4	7
5	Peru	1	2	4	7
7	Paraguay	0	2	1	3
8	Bolivia	0	0	0	0
8	Colombia	0	0	0	0
8	Ecuador	0	0	0	0
Totals (10 entries)		47	47	47	141

== Participation details ==
Team	(Uruguay); 1930	(Chile); 1932	(Argentina); 1934	(Brazil); 1935	(Chile); 1937	(Peru); 1938	(Brazil); 1939	(Uruguay); 1940	(Argentina); 1941	(Chile); 1942	(Peru); 1943	(Ecuador); 1945	(Brazil); 1947	(Paraguay); 1949	(Uruguay); 1953	(Colombia); 1955	(Chile); 1958	(Argentina); 1960	(Brazil); 1961	(Peru); 1963
Argentina	2nd	3rd	1st	1st	5th	2nd	3rd	2nd	1st	1st	1st	3rd	5th	5th	–	4th	4th	3rd	3rd	4th
Bolivia	–	–	–	–	–	–	–	–	–	–	6th	–	–	–	–	–	–	–	–	9th
Brazil	3rd	–	3rd	2nd	3rd	4th	1st	3rd	5th	4th	–	1st	2nd	2nd	2nd	3rd	1st	1st	1st	1st
Chile	4th	2nd	2nd	–	1st	–	5th	4th	4th	3rd	4th	4th	3rd	3rd	3rd	6th	5th	5th	6th	7th
Colombia	–	–	–	–	–	–	–	–	–	–	–	6th	–	–	7th	8th	6th	6th	–	8th
Ecuador	–	–	–	–	–	5th	–	–	–	5th	–	5th	4th	–	6th	7th	8th	7th	7th	6th
Paraguay	–	–	–	–	–	–	–	6th	6th	–	5th	–	–	6th	4th	2nd	3rd	2nd	4th	5th
Peru	–	–	–	–	4th	1st	4th	5th	2nd	–	3rd	–	6th	4th	5th	5th	7th	–	5th	2nd
Uruguay	1st	1st	4th	3rd	2nd	3rd	2nd	1st	3rd	2nd	2nd	2nd	1st	1st	1st	1st	2nd	4th	2nd	3rd
Venezuela	–	–	–	–	–	–	–	–	–	–	–	–	–	–	–	9th	–	–	8th	–

Team	(Argentina); 1966	(Paraguay); 1968	(Uruguay); 1969	(Uruguay); 1971	(Colombia); 1973	(Colombia); 1976	(Chile); 1977	(Argentina); 1979	(Uruguay); 1981	(Brazil); 1983	(Colombia); 1985	(Paraguay); 1987	(Ecuador); 1989	(Venezuela); 1991	(Brazil); 1993	(Uruguay); 1995	(Venezuela); 1997	(Argentina); 1999	(Chile); 2001	(Uruguay); 2003
Argentina	1st	5th	3rd	3rd	2nd	1st	3rd	1st	3rd	2nd	3rd	1st	2nd	3rd	2nd	2nd	3rd	2nd	1st	2nd
Bolivia	–	–	–	–	–	–	9th	–	–	–	–	–	9th	–	–	–	10th	10th	10th	–
Brazil	2nd	1st	2nd	1st	1st	2nd	1st	2nd	2nd	1st	1st	3rd	1st	2nd	1st	3rd	4th	1st	2nd	1st
Chile	6th	6th	5th	6th	5th	6th	6th	4th	4th	5th	7th	6th	–	–	6th	6th	6th	7th	6th	5th
Colombia	7th	7th	6th	5th	6th	5th	7th	–	–	6th	5th	–	7th	5th	–	–	5th	9th	7th	6th
Ecuador	5th	8th	–	8th	8th	–	–	–	–	–	–	–	5th	6th	5th	–	8th	6th	9th	–
Paraguay	8th	4th	7th	7th	7th	4th	8th	6th	6th	7th	6th	–	6th	7th	–	5th	7th	5th	5th	–
Peru	3rd	3rd	4th	4th	3rd	7th	5th	7th	5th	–	8th	5th	8th	8th	–	–	9th	8th	8th	–
Uruguay	4th	2nd	1st	2nd	4th	3rd	2nd	3rd	1st	3rd	2nd	4th	3rd	4th	4th	1st	1st	4th	4th	3rd
Venezuela	–	–	–	–	–	–	4th	5th	–	4th	4th	2nd	4th	1st	3rd	4th	2nd	3rd	3rd	4th

Team	(Brazil); 2004	(Venezuela); 2006	(Chile); 2008	(Colombia); 2010	(Argentina); 2012	(Venezuela); 2014	(Venezuela); 2016	Total
Argentina	1st	3rd	1st	2nd	1st	2nd	4th	46
Bolivia	–	–	–	–	7th	–	8th	9
Brazil	2nd	1st	4th	1st	4th	3rd	2nd	45
Chile	5th	6th	6th	7th	6th	6th	7th	43
Colombia	–	5th	5th	6th	7th	–	5th	26
Ecuador	–	–	–	8th	–	7th	9th	23
Paraguay	6th	–	–	5th	5th	5th	6th	32
Peru	–	–	–	–	–	8th	10th	31
Uruguay	4th	2nd	2nd	3rd	3rd	4th	3rd	47
Venezuela	3rd	4th	3rd	4th	2nd	1st	1st	22

== Top scorers ==
=== By total points ===
Year	Player	Position	Team	Total points
2001	Víctor Díaz	SG	Venezuela	166
2003	Víctor Díaz	SG	Venezuela	135
2004	Nicolás Mazzarino	PG	Uruguay	154
2006	Esteban Batista	C	Uruguay	85
2008	Román González	C	Argentina	127
2010	Stalin Ortiz	SF	Colombia	112
2012	Vítor Benite	SG	Brazil	135
2014	Mauricio Aguiar	SG	Uruguay	82
2016	Stalin Ortiz; Michael Jackson	SF	Colombia; Colombia	88

=== By points per game ===
Year	Player	Position	Team	PPG
2001	Víctor Díaz	SG	Venezuela	23.7
2003	Víctor Díaz	SG	Venezuela	22.5
2004	Nicolás Mazzarino	PG	Uruguay	25.7
2006	Stalin Ortiz	SF	Colombia	26.7
2008	Román González	C	Argentina	21.2
2010	Stalin Ortiz	SF	Colombia	22.4
2012	Evandro Arteaga Fuentes	PG	Chile	17.3
2014	Mauricio Aguiar	SG	Uruguay	16.4
2016	Stalin Ortiz; Michael Jackson	SF	Colombia; Colombia	17.6

=== Final – topscorer ===
Year	Player	Position	Team	Points
1999	Vanderlei Mazzuchini	SG	Brazil	20
2001	Leandro Palladino	SG	Argentina	22
2003	Guilherme Giovannoni	SF	Brazil	17
2004	Walter Herrmann	SF	Argentina	37
2006	Leandro García Morales; Marcelo Huertas	SG	Uruguay; Brazil	19
2008	Leandro García Morales	SG	Uruguay	33
2010	Murilo Becker	SF	Brazil	30
2012	Facundo Campazzo	PG	Argentina	15
2014	Greivis Vásquez	SG	Venezuela	24
2016	Gregory Vargas	SG	Venezuela	21

== MVP Award ==
Year	Player	Position	Team
2010	Murilo Becker	PF	Brazil
2012	Leonardo Gutiérrez	SF	Argentina
2014	Greivis Vásquez	SG	Venezuela
2016	Gregory Vargas	SG	Venezuela

== Medalists ==
- 1983

1. Brazil: Marquinhos, Fausto, Carioquinha, Cadum, Marcelo Vido, Sílvio Malvezi, Israel Andrade, Gerson Victalino, Marcel de Souza, André, Oscar Schmidt, Nilo Guimarães, Coach: Renato Brito Cunha
2. Argentina:
3. Uruguay:

- 1985

1. Brazil: Nilo Guimarães, Rolando Ferreira, Marcelo Vido, Sílvio Malvezi, Maury de Souza, Israel Andrade, Gerson Victalino, Oscar Schmidt, Guerrinha, Paulinho Villas Boas, João Vianna, Marcel de Souza, Coach: Ary Ventura Vidal
2. Uruguay:
3. Argentina:

- 1987

1. Argentina: Miguel Cortijo, Carlos Romano, Carlos Cerutti, Esteban Camisassa, Sergio Aispurúa, Luis González, Jorge Faggiano, Rubén Scolari, Esteban Pérez, Marcelo Milanesio, Sebastián Uranga, Aldo Yódice. Coach: Flor Meléndez
2. Brazil: André, Paulão, Chuí, Luiz de Azevedo, Gerson Victalino, Maury de Souza, Israel Andrade, Rolando Ferreira, Cadum, Guerrinha, Paulinho Villas Boas, João Vianna, Coach: Ary Vidal

- 1989

1. Brazil: Cadum, Giant Silva, Luiz de Azevedo, João Vianna, Paulinho Villas Boas, Guerrinha, João Vianna, Coach: Hélio Rubens Garcia
3. Uruguay:

- 1991

1. Venezuela: Víctor Díaz, Cesar Portillo, Alexander Nelcha, Nelson Solórzano, Armando Becker, Luis Jiménez, Sam Shepherd (naturalised American), Carl Herrera, Luis Sosa, Gabriel Estaba, Iván Olivares, Omar Walcott. Coach: Julio Toro
2. Brazil: Paulinho Villas Boas, Luiz de Azevedo, Maury de Souza, Rolando Ferreira, Josuel, Guerrinha, Chuí, Cosmo, Luisão, Luiz Augusto Zanon, Wilson Minuci, Marcel de Souza, Coach: José Medalha
3. Argentina: Gabriel Darras, Ariel Bernardini, Esteban De la Fuente, Orlando Tourn, Guillermo Coissón, Claudio Farabello, Facundo Sucatzky, Diego Osella, Marcelo Milanesio, Sebastián Uranga, Luis Oroño, Sergio Aispurúa. Coach: Carlos Boismené

- 1993

1. Brazil: Antônio José Nogueira Santana, Paulinho Villas Boas, André Luís Guimarães Fonseca, Josuel, Rogério Klafke, Wilson Minuci, Olívia, Demétrius Conrado Ferraciú, Coach: Ênio Ângelo Vecchi
2. Argentina: Marcelo Milanesio, Esteban De la Fuente, Jorge Racca, Sebastián Uranga, Diego Maggi, Eduardo Dominé, Gabriel Cocha, Carlos Romano, Rubén Wolkowyski. Coach: Guillermo Vecchio
3. Venezuela: Eduardo Crespo, José "Cheito" Ramos, Carlos Villasmil, Hermis Peñaloza. Coach: Guillermo Vecchio

- 1995

1. Uruguay: Juliano Rivera, Diego Losada, Luis Eduardo Pierri, Enrique Cativelli, Alain Mayor, Óscar Moglia, Marcelo Capalbo, Gonzalo Caneiro, Gustavo Szczygielski, Luis Silveira, Marcel Bouzout, Jeff Granger (naturalised American). Coach: Víctor Hugo Berardi, ass: Enrique Peretta.
2. Argentina: Daniel Farabello, Leopoldo Ruiz Moreno, Esteban Pérez, Ernesto Michel, Horacio Beigier, Gabriel Moravansky, José Luis Gil, Ariel Reale, Pablo Marino, Gabriel Fernández, Ariel Bernardini, Lucio Schiavi. Coach: Guillermo Vecchio
3. Brazil: Antônio José Nogueira Santana, Guerrinha, Caio Eduardo de Mello Cazziolato, Olívia, André Luís Guimarães Fonseca, Rolando Ferreira, Josuel, João Vianna, Rogério Klafke, Coach: Ary Ventura Vidal

- 1997 (es)

1. Uruguay: Camilo Acosta; Marcel Bouzout; Marcelo Capalbo; Diego Losada; Nicolás Mazzarino; Adolfo Medrick; Oscar Moglia; Juan Moltedo; Freddy Navarrete; Luis Pierri; Julio Rivera; Jesús Rostan; Luis Silveira; Gustavo Szczygielski. Coach: Víctor Hugo Berardi, ass: Enrique Perreta.
2. Venezuela: Victor David Díaz, Omar Alejandro Walcot, Gabriel Estaba, Armando Becker, Ivan Olivares, Carlos Villasmil, Jose Echenique, Richard Lugo, Ludwing Irazabal, Victor González, Alejandro Quiroz y Richard Medina. Coach: Julio Toro, ass: Nestor Salazar and Sam Shepherd.
3. Argentina: Luis Villar, Rubén Wolkowyski; Diego Osella, Esteban De la Fuente; Lucas Victoriano; Alejandro Montecchia; Hugo Sconochini; Gabriel Fernández; Daniel Farabello; Marcos Nóbile; Gabriel Díaz, Fabricio Oberto. Coach: Julio Lamas, ass: Ruben Magnano.

- 1999

1. Brazil: Caio Eduardo de Mello Cazziolato, Demétrius Conrado Ferraciú, Josuel, Caio Cazziolatto, Vanderlei, Sandro Varejão; Aylton Tesh, André Luís Guimarães Fonseca Ratto, Luiz Fernando. Coach: Helio Rubens.
2. Argentina: Alejandro Montecchia, Juan Espil, Leandro Palladino, Luis Scola, Ruben Wolkowyski; Lucas Victoriano, Sergio Aispurua, Emanuel Ginobili, Pepe Sanchez, Andres Nocioni. Coach: Julio Lamas.
3. Venezuela: Victor David Díaz, Carl Herrera, Harold Keeling, Alex Quiróz, Armando Becker, Ernesto Mijares, Omar Walcott, Richard Lugo, Víctor González, Vladimir Heredia, Diego Guevara, Heberth Bayona. Coach: Bruno D'Adezzio

- 2001

1. Argentina: Alejandro Montecchia, Leandro Palladino, Andrés Nocioni, Gabriel Fernández, Diego Osella, Silvio Gigena, Walter Herrmann, Andrés Pelussi, Víctor Baldo, Lucas Victoriano, Daniel Farabello, Leonardo Gutiérrez. Coach: Rubén Magnano.
2. Brazil: Demétrius Conrado Ferraciú, Sandro Varejão. Coach: Hélio Rubens Garcia
3. Venezuela: Victor David Díaz, Carl Herrera, Oscar Torres, Omar Walcott, Harold Keeling, Alex Quiróz, Armando Becker, Ernesto Mijares, Richard Lugo, Víctor González, Vladimir Heredia, Pablo Machado

- 2003 (es)

1. Brazil: Marcelo Machado, Arnaldinho, André Stefanelli, Válter Apolinário, Tiagao, Demétrius Conrado Ferraciú, Alex Ribeiro, Anderson Varejão, Guilherme Giovannoni, Tiago Splitter, André Bambu, Renato, Coach: Lula Ferreira.
2. Argentina: Federico Kammerichs, Pablo Prigioni, Román González, Bruno Labaque, Diego Lo Grippo, Patricio Prato, Leonardo Gutiérrez, Martín Leiva, Paolo Quinteros, Julio Mazzaro, Gabriel Fernández. Coach: Rubén Magnano.
3. Uruguay: Martín Osimani, Leandro García Morales, Alejandro Muro, Luis Silveira, Mauricio Aguiar, Juan Moltedo, Emilio Taboada, Trelonnie Owens, Gustavo Szczygielski, Marcel Bouzout, Esteban Batista, Enrique López Vilas. Coach: Néstor "Ché" García

- 2004

1. Argentina: Pablo Prigioni, Carlos Delfino, Walter Herrmann, Juan Gutiérrez, Leonardo Gutiérrez, Román González, Bruno Lábaque, Diego Lo Grippo, Daniel Farabello, Andrés Pelussi, Diego Prego, Julio Mázzaro. Coach: Rubén Magnano

- 2006

1. Brazil: Arthur Silva, Manteiguinha Rodrigues, Murilo Becker, 'Estevam' Ferreira, 'Nezinho' dos Santos, Paulo Prestes, 'Duda' Machado, Marcelinho Huertas, Marcus Toledo, 'Caio' Torres, 'Andre Bambu' Pereira, Luis Felipe Gruber. Coach: Aluisio Xavier Ferreira

- 2008 (es)

1. Argentina: Nicolás De Los Santos, Maximiliano Stanic, Luis Cequeira, Paolo Quinteros, Diego García, Marcos Mata, Sebastián Vega, Andrés Pelussi, Leonardo Mainoldi, Juan Pedro Gutiérrez, Román González, Diego Gerbaudo. Coach: Sergio Hernández, ass: Guillermo Narvarte.
2. Uruguay: Mauricio Aguiar, Gustavo Barrera, Esteban Batista, Diego Castrillón, Claudio Charquero, Leandro García Morales, Sebastián Izaguirre, Sebastián Vázquez, Nicolás Mazzarino, Diego González, Gastón Páez, Juan Pablo Silveira. Coach: Gerardo Jauri.
3. Venezuela: Héctor Romero, Oscar Torres, Carlos Cedeño, José Vargas, Rafael Guevara, Miguel Marriaga, Luis Bethelmy, Axiers Sucre, Roque Osorio, Rafael Pérez, Luis Julio, Jesús Centeno. Coach: Nelson Solórzano

- 2010 (es)

1. Brazil: Murilo Becker, Rafael Ferreira Mineiro, João Paulo Batista, Bruno Fiorotto, Lucas Cipolini, Jonathan Tavernari, André Luiz Goes, Arthur Belchior, Eduardo Machado, Luiz Felipe Lemes, Fúlvio Chiantia, Welington Santos "Nezinho". Coach: João Marcelo Leite.
2. Argentina:Juan Pablo Cantero, Luis Eduardo Cequeira, Juan Manuel Fernández, Leonel Schattmann, Marcos Daniel Mata, Matías Sandes, Sebastián Ernesto Vega, Federico Matías Aguerre, Leonardo Andrés Mainoldi, Alejandro Martín Alloatti, Román Javier González, Juan Pedro Gutiérrez. Coach: Sergio Hernández.
3. Uruguay: Bruno Fitipaldo, Fernando Martínez, Martín Osimani, Joaquín Izuibejeres, Joaquín Osimani, Iván Loriente, Mauricio Aguiar, Mathías Calfani, Sebastián Izaguirre, Reque Newsome, Esteban Batista, Gastón Páez

- 2012 (es)

1. Argentina: Juan Pedro Gutiérrez Lanas, Juan Manuel Fernández, Marcos Daniel Mata, Carlos Matías Sandes, Selem Safar, Facundo Campazzo, Leonardo Gutiérrez, Martín Leiva, Marcos Delía, Franco Nahuel Giorgetti, Nicolás Laprovittola, Federico Martín Van Lacke.Coach: Julio Lamas.
2. Venezuela: Miguel Marriaga, Gregory Vargas, Greivis Josue Vásquez, Jhornan Zamora, David Cubillán, Francisco José Centeno, José G. Vargas Díaz, José Juan Bravo Viloria, Héctor O. Romero Rivas, Axiers Sucre Briceño, Gregory Echenique, Windi M. Graterol Clemente. Coach: Eric Musselman
3. Uruguay: Bruno Fitipaldo, Fernando Martínez, Martín Osimani, Joaquín Izuibejeres, Joaquín Osimani, Iván Loriente, Mauricio Aguiar, Mathías Calfani, Sebastián Izaguirre, Reque Newsome, Esteban Batista, Gastón Páez

- 2014

1. Venezuela: Miguel Marriaga, Greivis Vásquez, David Cubillán, José Vargas, Luis Bhetelmy, Gregory Vargas, Jhornan Zamora, Nestor Colmenares, Jesús Centeno, Heislert Guillent, Miguel Ruiz, Windi Graterol. Coach: Néstor "Ché" García.
2. Argentina: Marcos Mata, Nicolás Laprovittola, Marcos Delía, Matías Bortolín, Selem Safar; Nicolás Romano, Nicolás Richotti, Juan Pablo Figueroa, Nicolás Brussino, Pablo Espinoza, Martín Leiva, Franco Giorgetti. Coach: Nicolas Casalánguida.

- 2016

Venezuela: José Vargas, Néstor Colmenares, Luis "El tsunami" Bethelmy, Gregory Vargas, David Cubillán. Coach: Néstor "Ché" García

== See also ==
- South American Basketball Championship for Women
- FIBA AmeriCup
- Campeonato Sudamericano de Clubes Campeones de Básquetbol
- Pan American Games
