= Pedro Araya =

Pedro Araya may refer to:

- Pedro Segundo Araya (fl. 1910s), Chilean politician
- Pedro Araya Ortiz (1929–2003), Chilean construction worker and politician
- Pedro Araya Guerrero (born 1974), Chilean politician
- Pedro Araya (basketball) (1925–1998), Chilean basketball player
- Pedro Araya (footballer) (born 1942), Chilean footballer
