= Garafulic =

Garafulic is a surname. Notable people with the surname include:

- Igor Garafulic Olivares, Chilean economist, academic, and former intendant of the Santiago Metropolitan Region
- Lily Garafulic Yankovic (1914–2012), Chilean sculptor and a member of the Generation of 40 (Generación del 40) artists
- Maximiliano Garafulic (1938–2007), Chilean basketball player
