= Orlando Silva =

Orlando Silva may refer to:

- Orlando Silva (basketball) (1929–1989), Chilean basketball player
- Orlando Silva (politician) (born 1971), Brazilian politician
