= La Roja =

La Roja (Spanish: The Red one), may refer to:

- Chile men's national basketball team
- Chile national football team
- Chile women's national football team
- Spain national football team
- Spain women's national football team
