= 1966 South American Basketball Championship =

21st South American Basketball Championship

Tournament details
- Host country: Argentina
- Dates: December 2–12
- Teams: 8
- Venue: 1 (in 1 host city)

Final positions
- Champions: Argentina (6th title)

The South American Basketball Championship 1966 was the 20th edition of this regional tournament. It was held from December 2 to 12 in Mendoza, San Juan, Argentina. Eight teams competed.

== Results ==
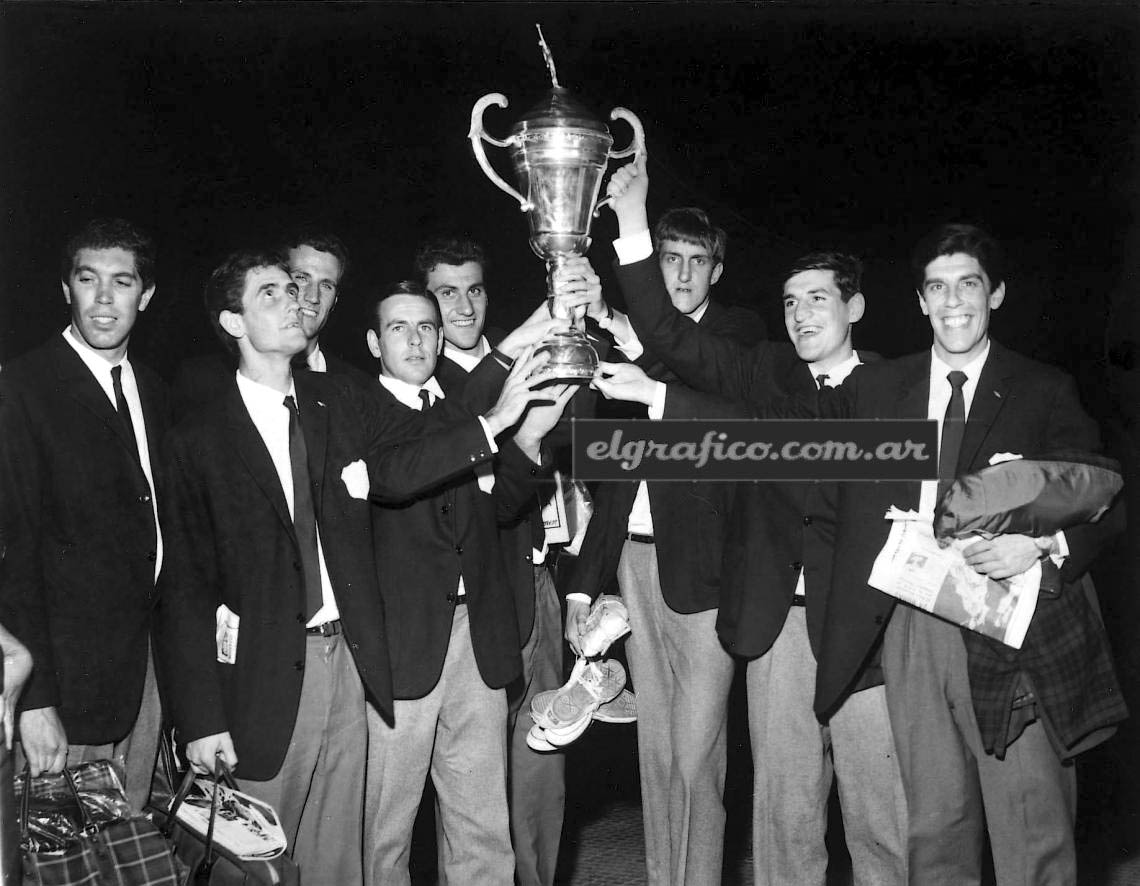
Argentina with the trophy awarded

The final standings were determined by a round robin, where the 8 teams played against each other once.

Team	Pld	W	L	PF	PA	PD	Pts
Argentina	7	6	1	500	353	+147	13
Brazil	7	6	1	470	337	+133	13
Peru	7	5	2	458	448	+10	12
Uruguay	7	4	3	460	444	+16	11
Ecuador	7	3	4	426	477	−51	10
Chile	7	2	5	431	513	−82	9
Colombia	7	1	6	464	523	−59	8
Paraguay	7	1	6	409	523	−114	8
