= 1937 South American Basketball Championship =

5th South American Basketball Championship

Tournament details
- Host country: Chile
- Dates: 5-16 March
- Teams: 5
- Venues: 2 (in 2 host cities)

Final positions
- Champions: Chile (1st title)

The 1937 South American Basketball Championship was the 5th edition of this tournament. It was held in Valparaíso and Santiago, Chile and won by the host, Chile national basketball team. A record 5 teams competed, including Peru in their first appearance.

== Final rankings ==
1. Chile
2. Uruguay
3. Brazil
4. Peru
5. Argentina

== Results ==
Each team played the other four teams twice apiece, for a total of eight games played by each team and 20 overall in the tournament.

Rank	Team	Pts	W	L	PF	PA	Diff
1	Chile	16	8	0	244	185	+59
2	Uruguay	13	5	3	201	198	+3
3	Brazil	11	3	5	181	214	-33
4	Peru	10	2	6	182	190	-8
5	Argentina	10	2	6	197	218	-21

Chile	21 - 20	Argentina
Argentina	30 - 33	Chile
Chile	35 - 22	Brazil
Brazil	18 - 34	Chile
Chile	33 - 21	Peru
Peru	34 - 35	Chile
Chile	19 - 13	Uruguay
Uruguay	27 - 34	Chile
Uruguay	26 - 30	Argentina
Argentina	29 - 30	Uruguay
Uruguay	28 - 23	Brazil
Brazil	27 - 30	Uruguay
Uruguay	24 - 17	Peru
Peru	19 - 23	Uruguay
Brazil	31 - 22	Argentina
Argentina	21 - 30	Brazil
Brazil	12 - 29	Peru
Peru	15 - 18	Brazil
Peru	23 - 20	Argentina
Argentina	25 - 24	Peru
