= Luis Salvadores =

Chilean basketball player (1932–2014)

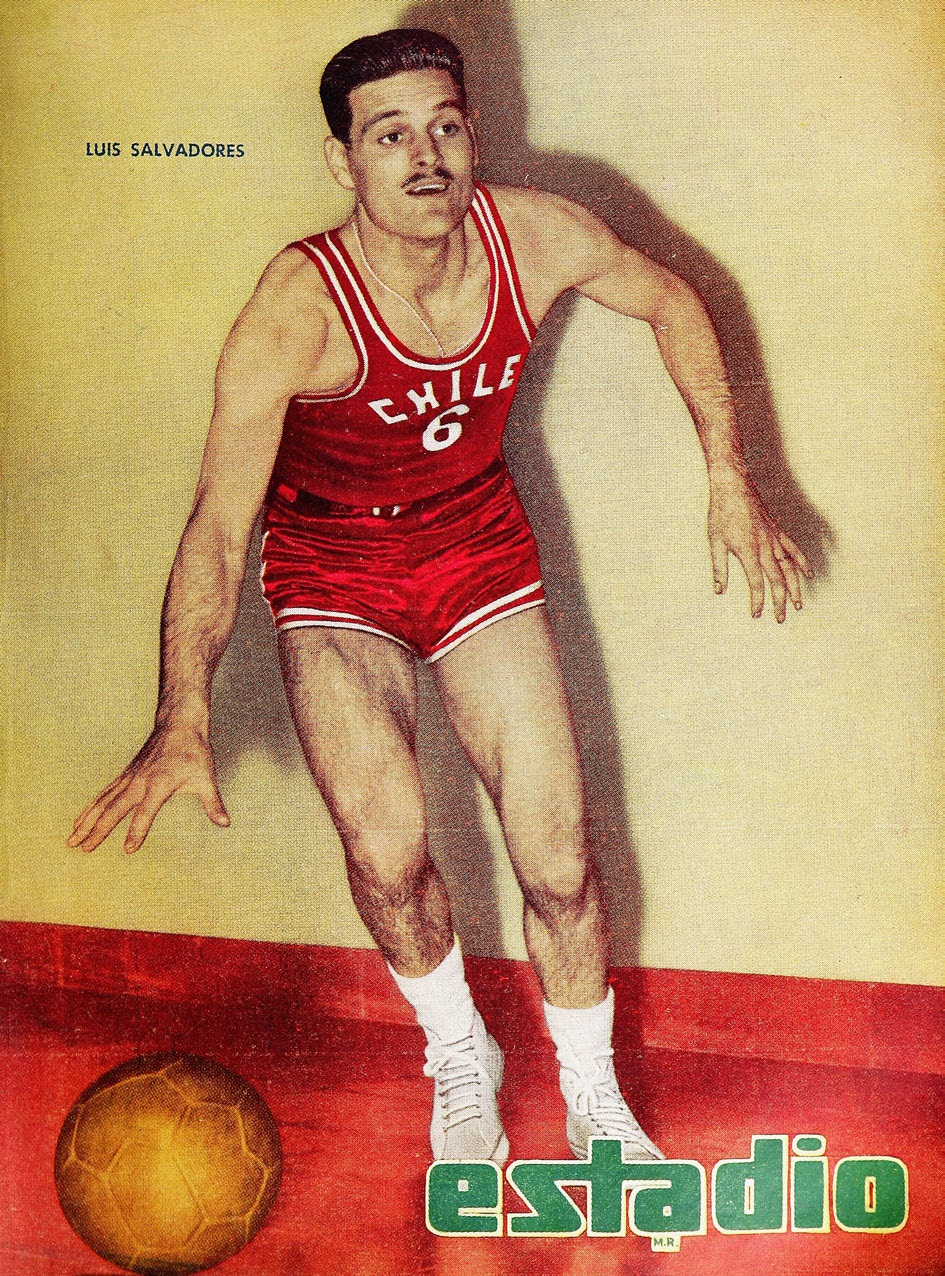
Luis Salvadores in 1959

Luis Salvadores Salvi (August 26, 1932 in Lanco – February 1, 2014 in Temuco) was a Chilean basketball player who competed in the 1956 Summer Olympics. One of nine boys and two girls, he and his brothers established the Salvadores Salvi name as part of the basketball legend of Chile. One of his brothers, Alvaro Salvadores, was also well-known in professional basketball.

== Biography ==
Luis Salvadores Salvi shot his first basket at the San José de Temuco school in 1944, shortly after arriving from his native Lanco to study Humanities. At age 16, he joined the Deportivo San José club, winning the championship. In the same year, 1949, he joined the Temuco league, participating in two major championships, the "Provincias del Sur", or "Southern Provinces", winning in Osorno, and the "Campeonato Nacional" or "National Championship", winning in Santiago, Chile. This is how his fifty-year-old basketball career started, which would also include his participation in the 1956 Melbourne Olympic Games, the 1959 FIBA World Championship and two South American Championships. An earthquake caused him to miss the 1960 Olympic Games. He continued to play basketball until he was 78 in a senior league, playing alongside one of his sons. He resided in Temuco, Chile and was well-respected around the area.

== Clubs ==
- Deportivo San José - (Chile) - 1948 to 1949 and 1962 to 1974
- Universidad de Chile - (Chile) - 1950-1954
- Club Deportivo Huachipato - (Chile) - 1955-1958
- Unión Deportiva Española - (Chile) - 1959-1961

== Individual honors ==
- Best Basketball Player of Chile - 1966
- The "Mejor de los Mejores" Award for best athlete in Chile in all disciplines - 1968 and 1969

== See also ==
- Chile national basketball team
