= Andrés Pelussi =

Argentine-Italian basketball player

Medal record

Men's Basketball

Representing Argentina

FIBA AmeriCup
Bronze medal – third place	2009 San Juan	

FIBA South American Championship
Gold medal – first place	2004 Rio de Janeiro	
Gold medal – first place	2008 Puerto Montt	

Goodwill Games
Silver medal – second place	2001 Brisbane	

Andrés Ricardo Pelussi (born October 14, 1977) is a former Argentine-Italian professional basketball player. He was also a member of the senior Argentine national basketball team. At a height of 1.98 m (6 ft 6 in) tall, and a weight of 114 kg (251 lb), he played at the small forward and power forward positions.

== Professional career ==
Pelussi played with Libertad de Sunchales of the Argentine Liga Nacional de Básquetbol (LNB), where he helped the team win the 2008 Argentine League championship. Pelussi spent his entire professional club career in Argentina, aside from three seasons in Italy. He played in the Italian League with Virtus Bologna.

== National team career ==
Pelussi was a long-time member of the senior Argentine national basketball team. He first participated with the national team at the 2004 South American Championship. He saw his most extensive action with the Argentine national team at the 2008 South American Championship, where he averaged 12.7 points and 5.5 rebounds per game for the team. He also competed with the bronze medal-winning Argentine team, at the 2009 FIBA Americas Championship, where he played primarily off the bench, averaging 3.3 points and 2.2 rebounds per game.
