= Luiz Augusto Zanon =

Brazilian basketball player and coach

Luiz Augusto Zanon (São Carlos, 17 June 1963) is a Brazilian former basketball player and coach. As a player, Zanon won a bronze with the national team at the FIBA Under-19 World Championship, a gold and a silver at the South American Basketball Championship, and competed at the 1991 Pan American Games.

Zanon became a coach in the 2000s, winning the Brazilian championship of men with Limeira, and the women's one with São Carlos. In 2013, Zanon was hired to become the new coach of the Brazilian women's national team. The team won a bronze medal at the 2013 FIBA Americas Championship for Women and qualified for the 2014 FIBA World Championship for Women. He resigned from the national team in December 2015 due to health concerns.
