= Orlando Etcheberrigaray =

Chilean basketball player (1933–2017)

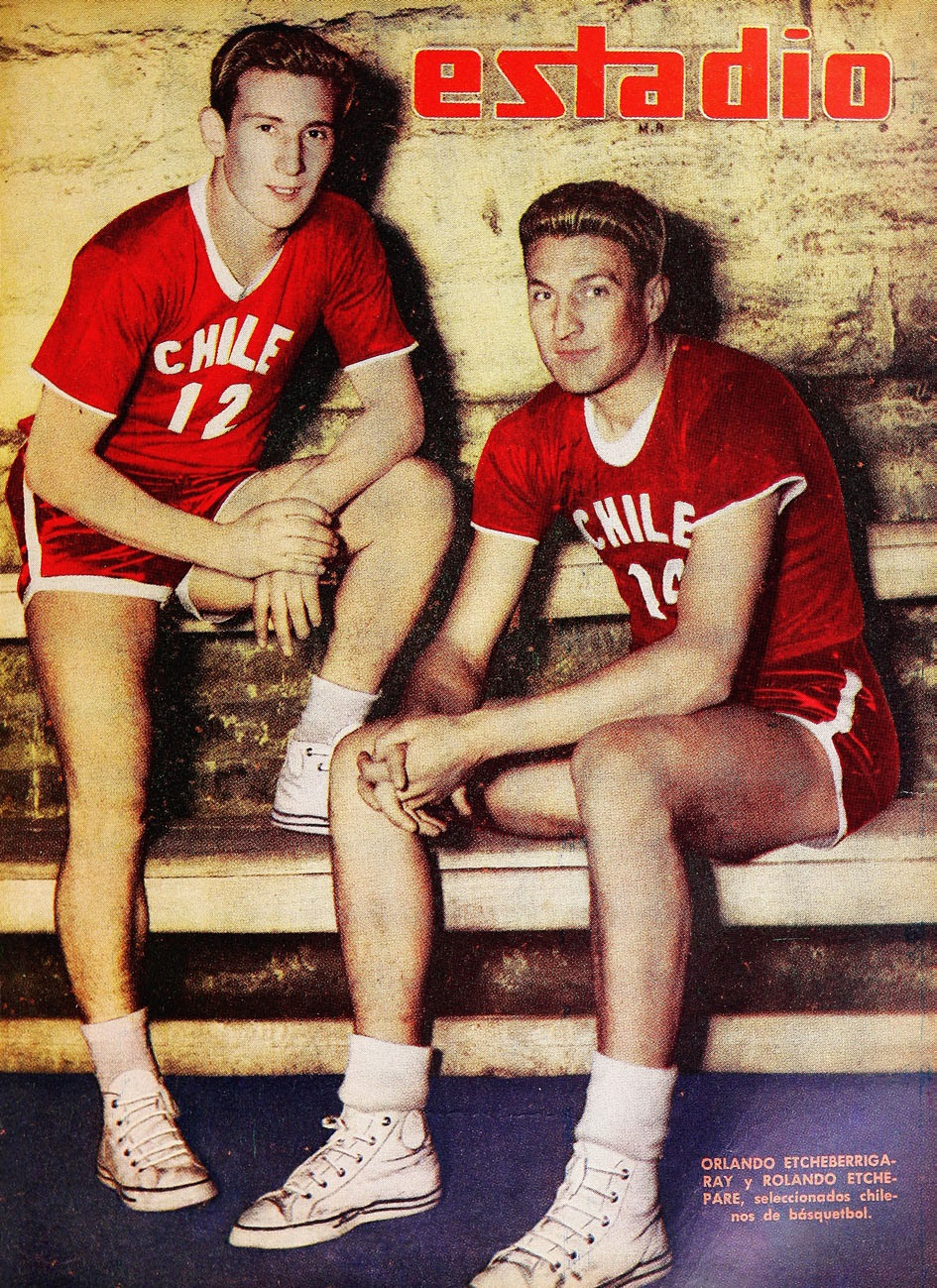

Personal information
- Full name: Orlando Etcheberrigaray Ríos
- Nationality: Chilean
- Born: 3 March 1933
- Died: 25 March 2017 (aged 84)

Sport
- Sport: Basketball

Orlando Etcheberrigaray Ríos (3 March 1933 – 25 March 2017) was a Chilean basketball player. He competed in the men's tournament at the 1956 Summer Olympics.
