= Luis Marmentini =

Chilean basketball player (1922–1996)

Enrique Anjel Marmentini Gil
Personal information
- Born: 15 July 1922 Santiago, Chile
- Died: 25 December 1996 (aged 74) Santiago, Chile

Sport
- Sport: Basketball

Enrique Anjel Marmentini Gil (15 July 1922 – 25 December 1996) was a Chilean basketball player. He competed in the men's tournament at the 1948 Summer Olympics.
