= Raúl Urra =

Chilean basketball player

Personal information
- Born: 3 July 1930 Santiago, Chile
- Died: July 2014 (aged 83–84)

Sport
- Sport: Basketball

Raúl Osvaldo Urra da Forno (3 July 1930 – July 2014) was a Chilean basketball player. He competed in the men's tournament at the 1956 Summer Olympics.
