= Christian Santander =

Chilean basketball coach

Cristian Alberto Santander Lavado (born January 22, 1972) in Remedios de Escalada, is an Argentine basketball coach for the Chilean national team. was Champion in LBF league in Brazil for Sampaio Basquete.

In the past, he coached Argentine women's national team.
