= Álvaro Salvadores =

Chilean basketball player

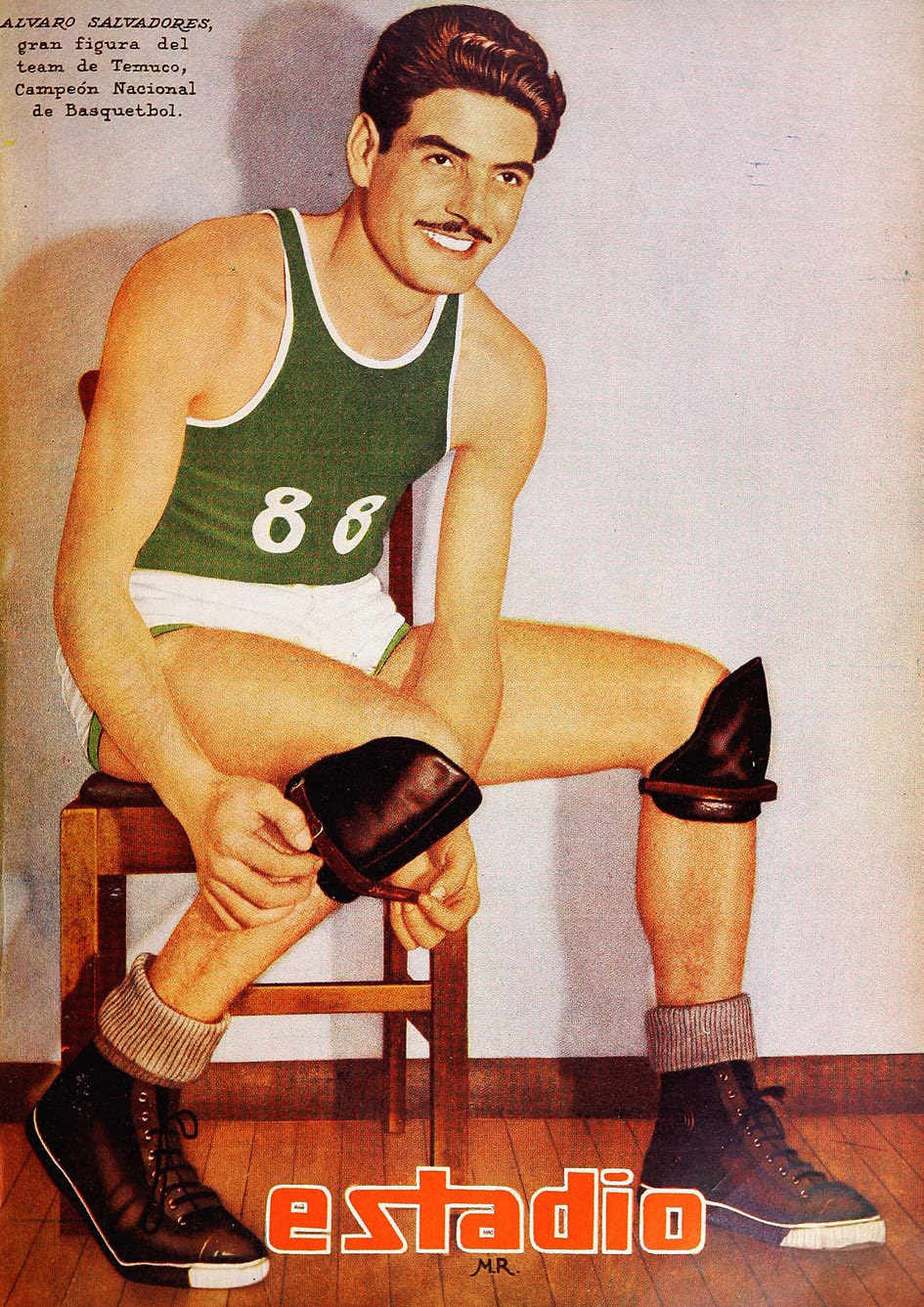
- Salvadores, in 1951.

Personal information
- Born: October 12, 1928 Lanco, Región de los Ríos, Chile
- Died: 13 April 2002 (aged 73) Cartagena de Indias, Bolívar, Colombia
- Listed height: 186 cm (6 ft 1 in)
- Listed weight: 84 kg (185 lb)
- Position: Small forward

Career highlights
- As player

Álvaro Salvadores Salvi (born 12 October 1928 in Chile – died 13 April 2002 in Cartagena de Indias, Colombia) was a Chilean-Spaniard basketball player who competed at the 1950 FIBA World Championship in the Spain national team, and at the 1952 Summer Olympics in the Chile men's national team. Salvadores was also Chile's ambassador to Colombia, from 1986 to 1988. One of his younger brothers, Luis Salvadores, was a basketball player.

== Early life ==
As a young boy, Salvadores' family immigrated from Spain to Chile by boat, due to the Spanish Civil War. On the way, he was kidnapped by a Gypsy, but was he was later found by his mother, with the help of some men. His family moved to Lanco, Chile, where they were known for their talent in basketball and music. He studied Law at the Universidad de Concepción, but gave it up a couple of years later.

== Basketball career ==
Salvadores played basketball from a young age. He played professional basketball for many years in Chile. He took part in the first FIBA Basketball World Cup, hosted by Argentina, in 1950, after he offered the Spanish Basketball Federation to represent the senior Spain national basketball team. At the tournament, he was the leader in points per game, scoring 13.8 points per game. He was also named to the All-Tournament Team.

In 1952, Salvadores was a member of the senior Chilean basketball team, which finished in fifth place at the 1952 Summer Olympics Olympic Games. He played in all eight of Chile's games during the tournament, despite fracturing his femur during the dying minutes of the seventh game, after colliding with the goal post when he botched a layup attempt. He played the last game on large amounts of pain medication, which would later be described as, "a mixture that could very nearly have killed him."

== Personal life ==
Álvaro Salvadores went to Cartagena de Indias, Colombia for a basketball competition. There, he met his future wife, Elsa de la Espriella, with whom he fell in love, and he decided to stay in Colombia. He was known for his handsome looks, which granted him a role as an extra in the film, "The Adventurers", in 1970. He had four children, Álvaro, Mónica, Elsa, and María Angélica Salvadores. After being Chile's ambassador to Colombia, he continued to live there, until his death in 2002, from lung cancer.
