= Luiz de Azevedo (basketball) =

Brazilian basketball player

Personal information
- Born: 8 October 1964 (age 62) Vitória, Brazil
- Listed height: 6 ft 5 in (1.96 m)
- Listed weight: 210 lb (95 kg)
- Position: Small forward

Luiz Felipe Faria de Azevedo, also commonly known as Luiz Felipe (born 8 October 1964) is a Brazilian former professional basketball player. With the senior Brazilian national basketball team, De Azevedo competed at the 1988 Summer Olympics, and the 1990 FIBA World Cup.
