= Marcos Sánchez (basketball) =

Chilean basketball player (1924–2005)

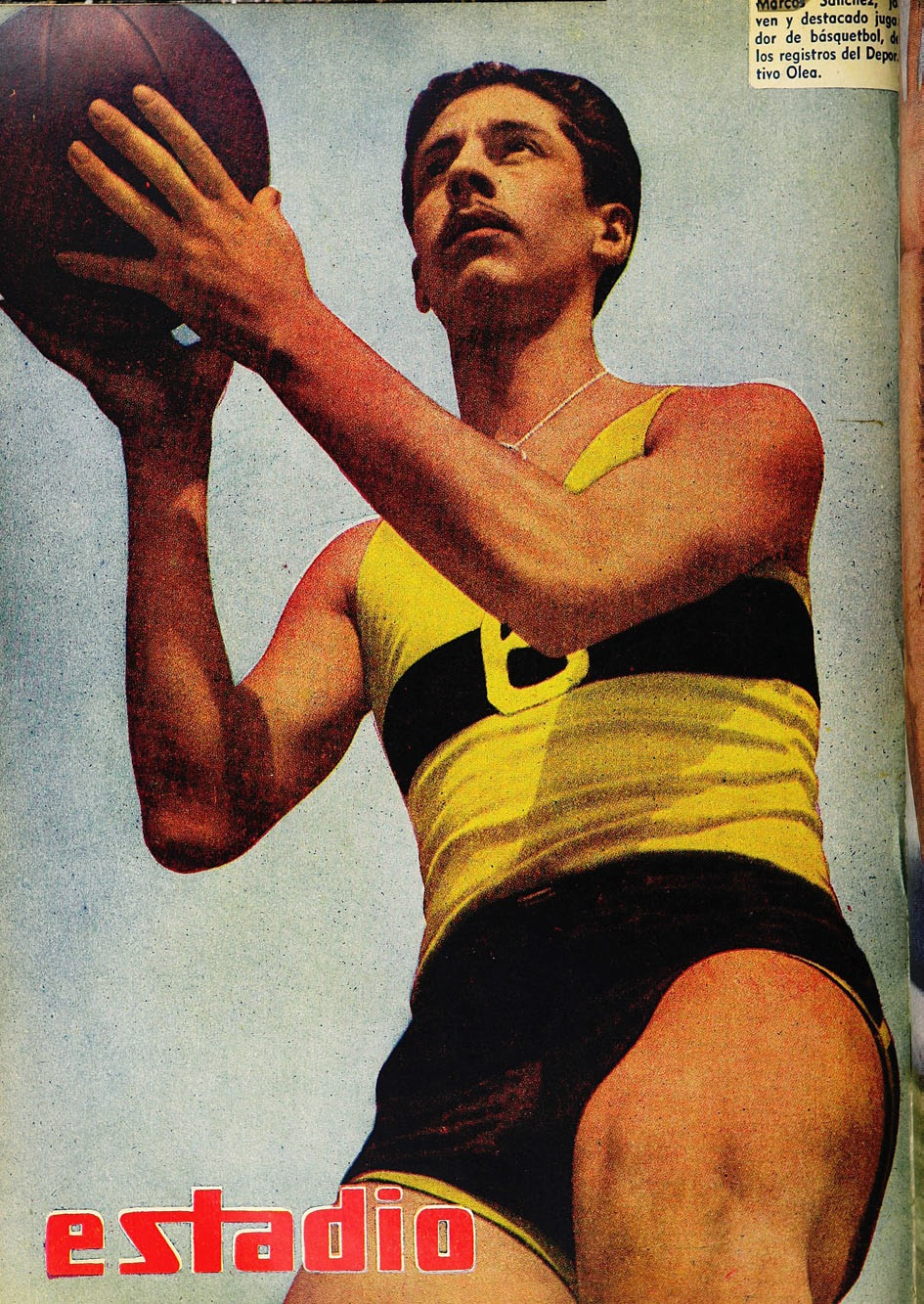

Personal information
- Born: 4 January 1924 Santiago, Chile
- Died: 31 January 2005 (aged 81)

Sport
- Sport: Basketball

Marcos Sánchez Carmona (4 January 1924 – 31 January 2005) was a Chilean basketball player. He competed in the men's tournament at the 1948 Summer Olympics.
