= Juan José Gallo =

Chilean basketball player (1924–2003)

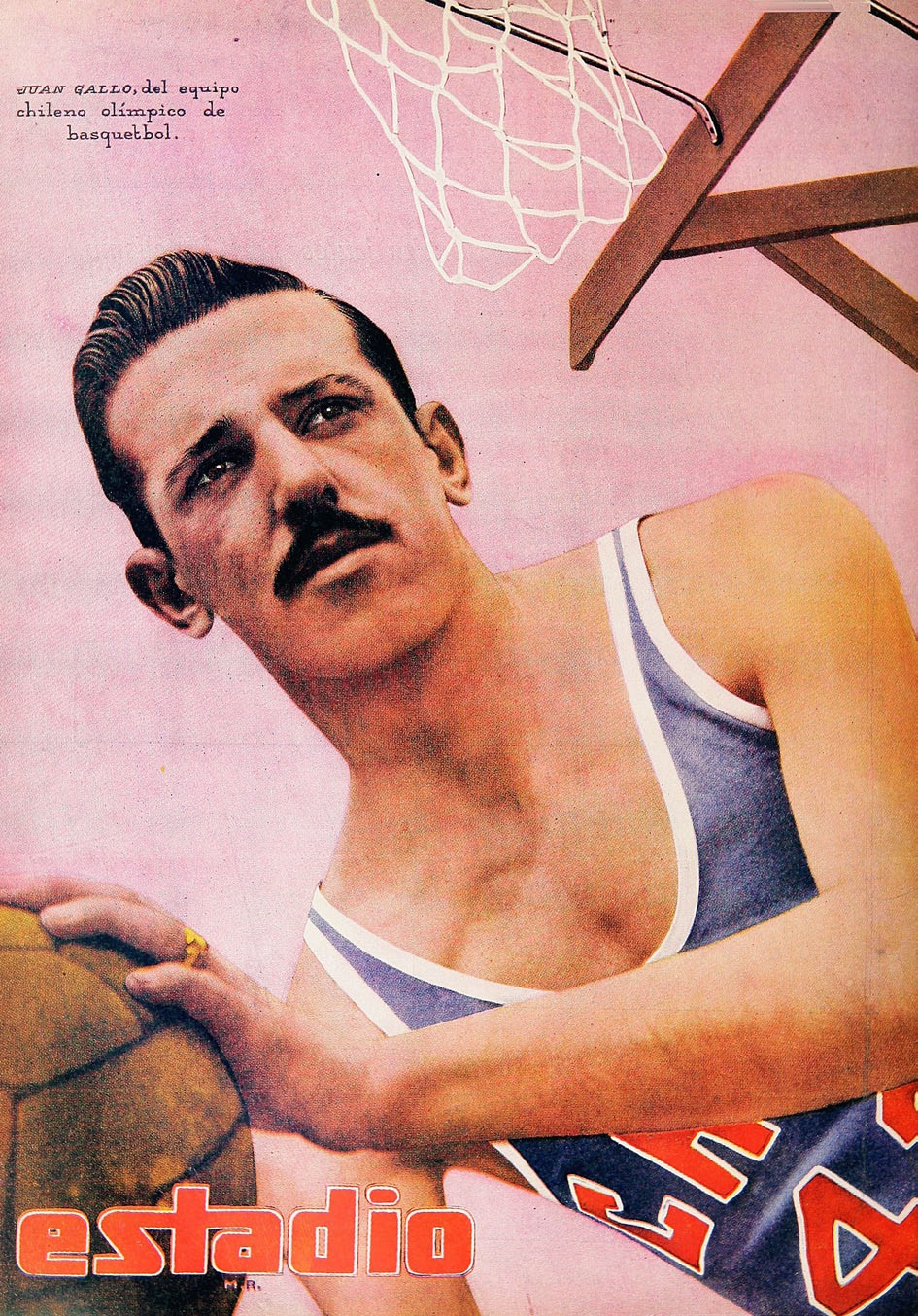

Personal information
- Born: 18 October 1924 Iquique, Chile
- Died: 10 June 2003 (aged 78)

Sport
- Sport: Basketball

Juan José Gallo Chinchilla (18 October 1924 – 10 June 2003) was a Chilean basketball player. He competed in the men's tournament at the 1948 Summer Olympics and the 1952 Summer Olympics.
