= Eduardo Cordero =

Chilean basketball player (1921–1991)

Personal information
- Born: 12 September 1921 Iquique, Chile
- Died: 3 September 1991 (aged 69) Valparaíso, Chile

Sport
- Sport: Basketball

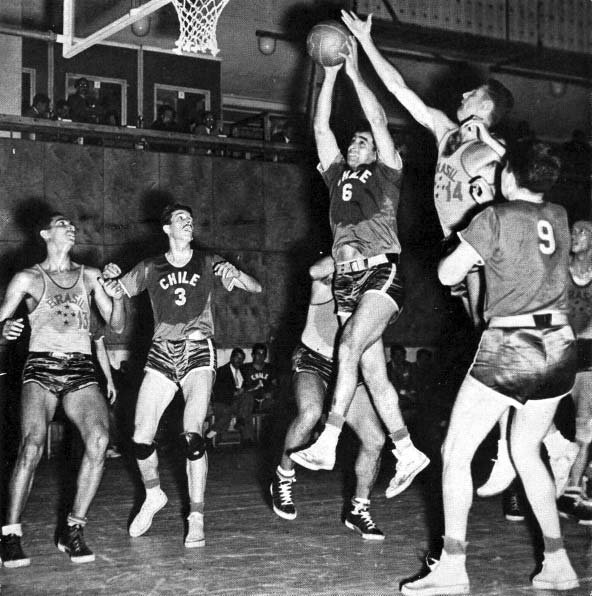
The Chile-Brazil 1952 Men's Basketball Team

Eduardo Cordero Fernández (12 September 1921 – 3 September 1991) was a Chilean basketball player. He competed in the men's tournament at the 1948 Summer Olympics and the 1952 Summer Olympics.
