= Victor Mahana =

Chilean basketball player (1922–2001)

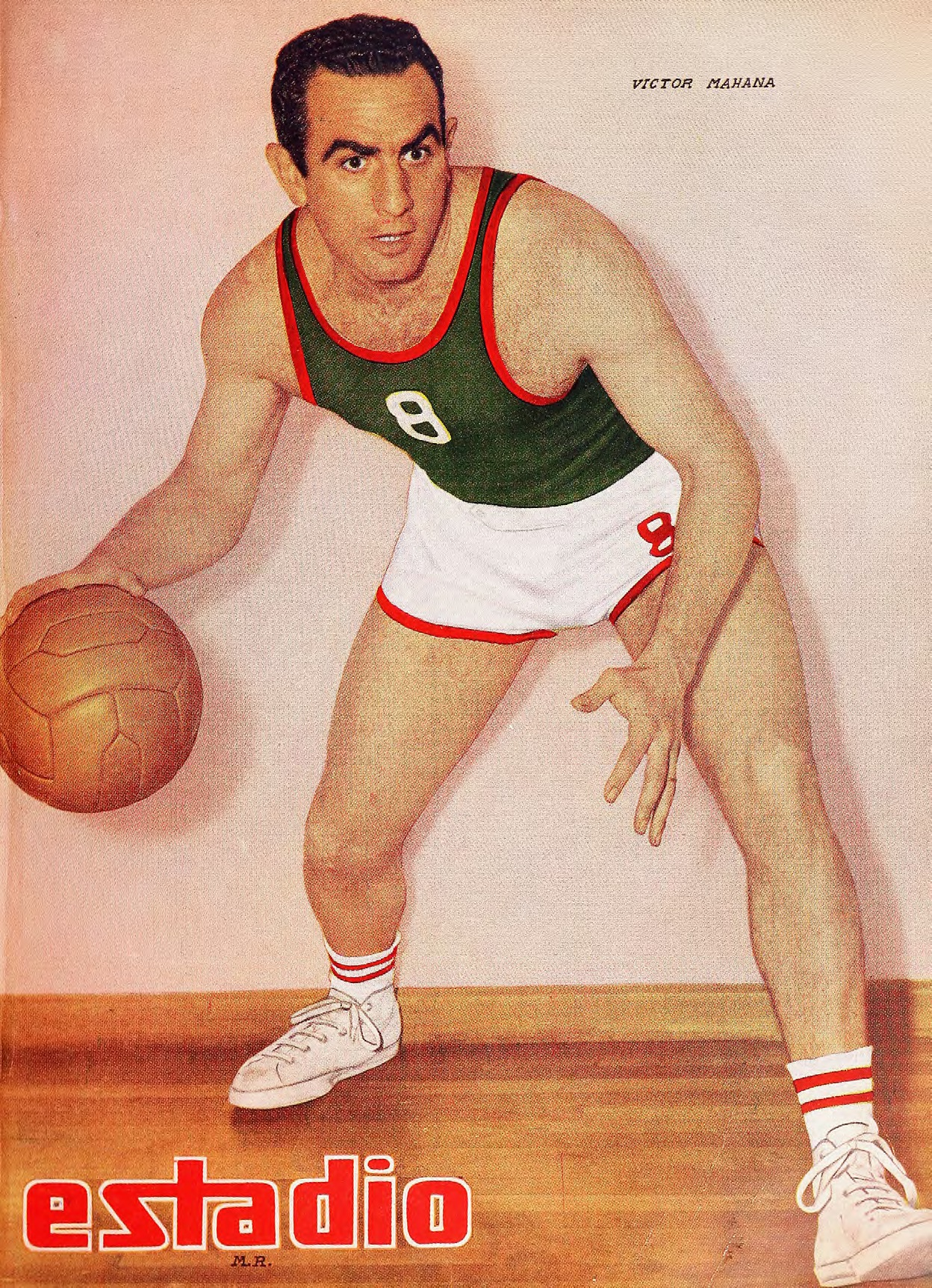

Personal information
- Born: 12 August 1922 Santiago, Chile
- Died: 6 September 2001 (aged 79) Santiago, Chile

Sport
- Sport: Basketball

Victor Mahana Badrie (12 August 1922 – 6 September 2001) was a Chilean basketball player. He competed in the men's tournament at the 1948 Summer Olympics, the 1952 Summer Olympics and the 1956 Summer Olympics.
