= Maximiliano Garafulic =

Chilean basketball player

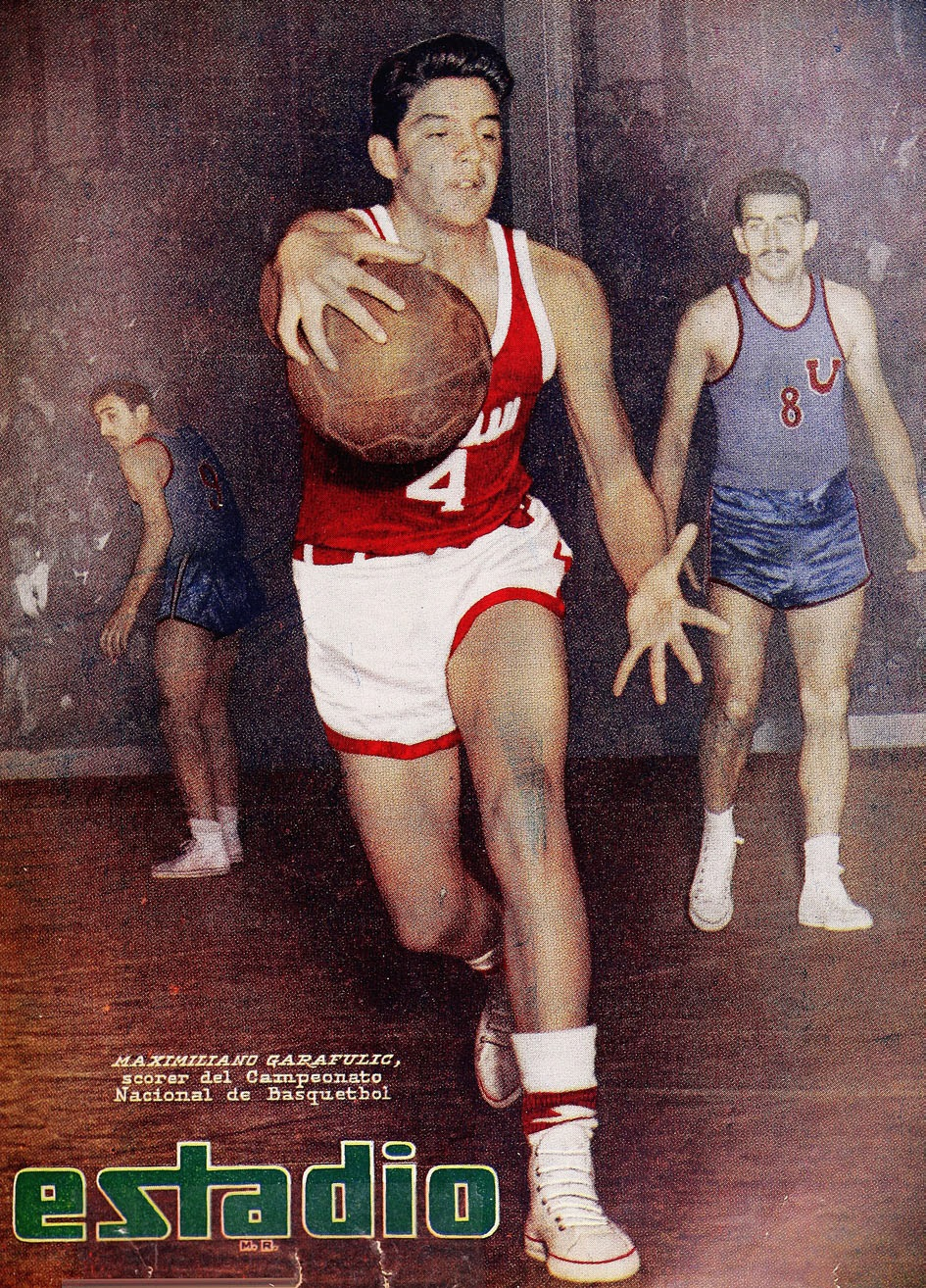

Personal information
- Born: 6 August 1938; Antofagasta, Chile
- Died: 23 November 2007 (aged 69); Antofagasta, Chile

Sport
- Sport: Basketball

Maximiliano Garafulic Alfred (6 August 1938 – 23 November 2007) was a Chilean basketball player. He competed in the men's tournament at the 1956 Summer Olympics.
