= Exequiel Figueroa =

Chilean basketball player (1924–2005)

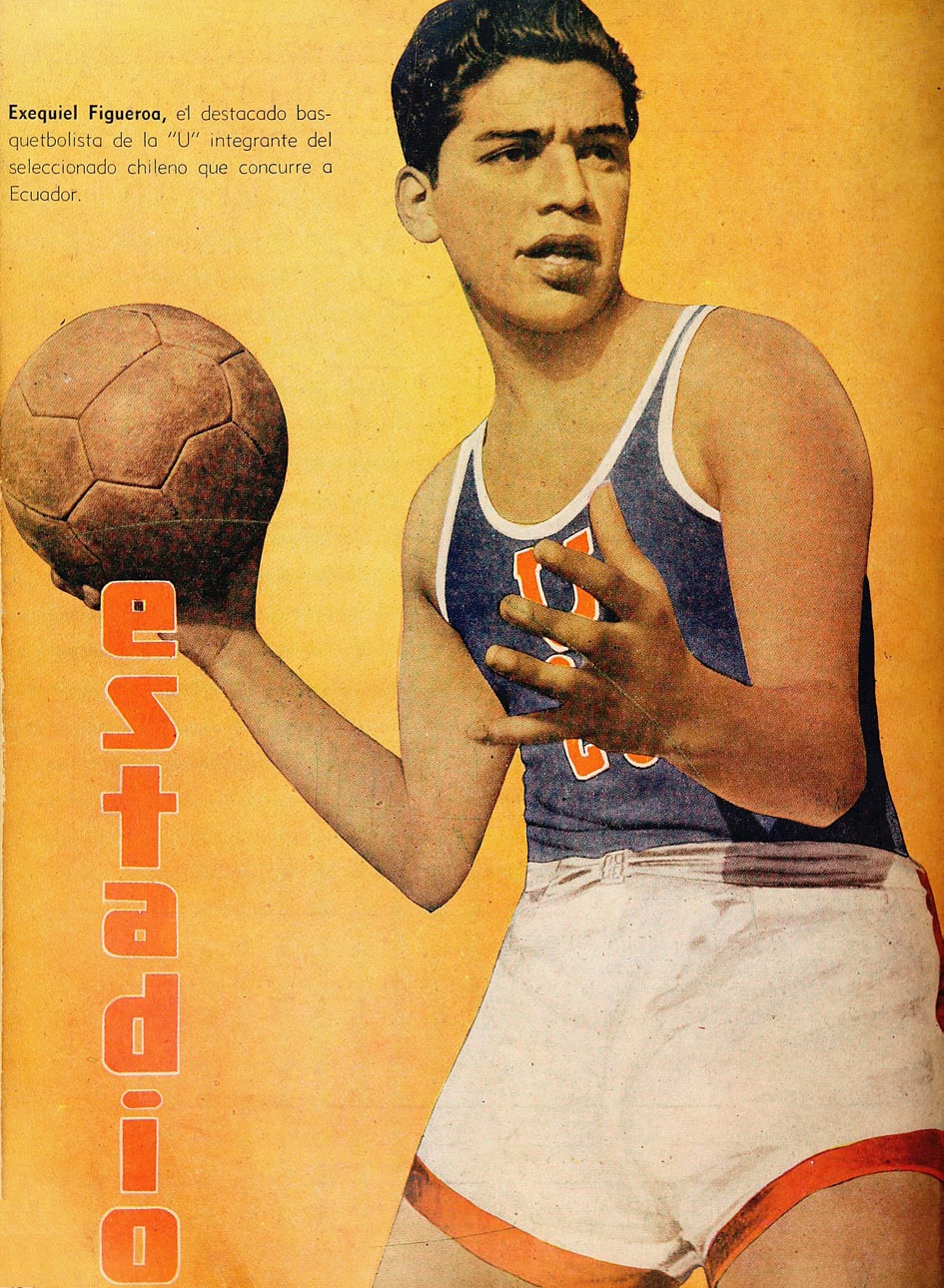

Personal information
- Born: 20 September 1924 Santiago, Chile
- Died: 28 December 2005 (aged 81)

Sport
- Sport: Basketball

Exequiel Fernando Figueroa Reyes (20 September 1924 – 28 December 2005) was a Chilean basketball player. He competed in the men's tournament at the 1948 Summer Olympics and the 1952 Summer Olympics.
