= Hernán Masanés =

Chilean cyclist

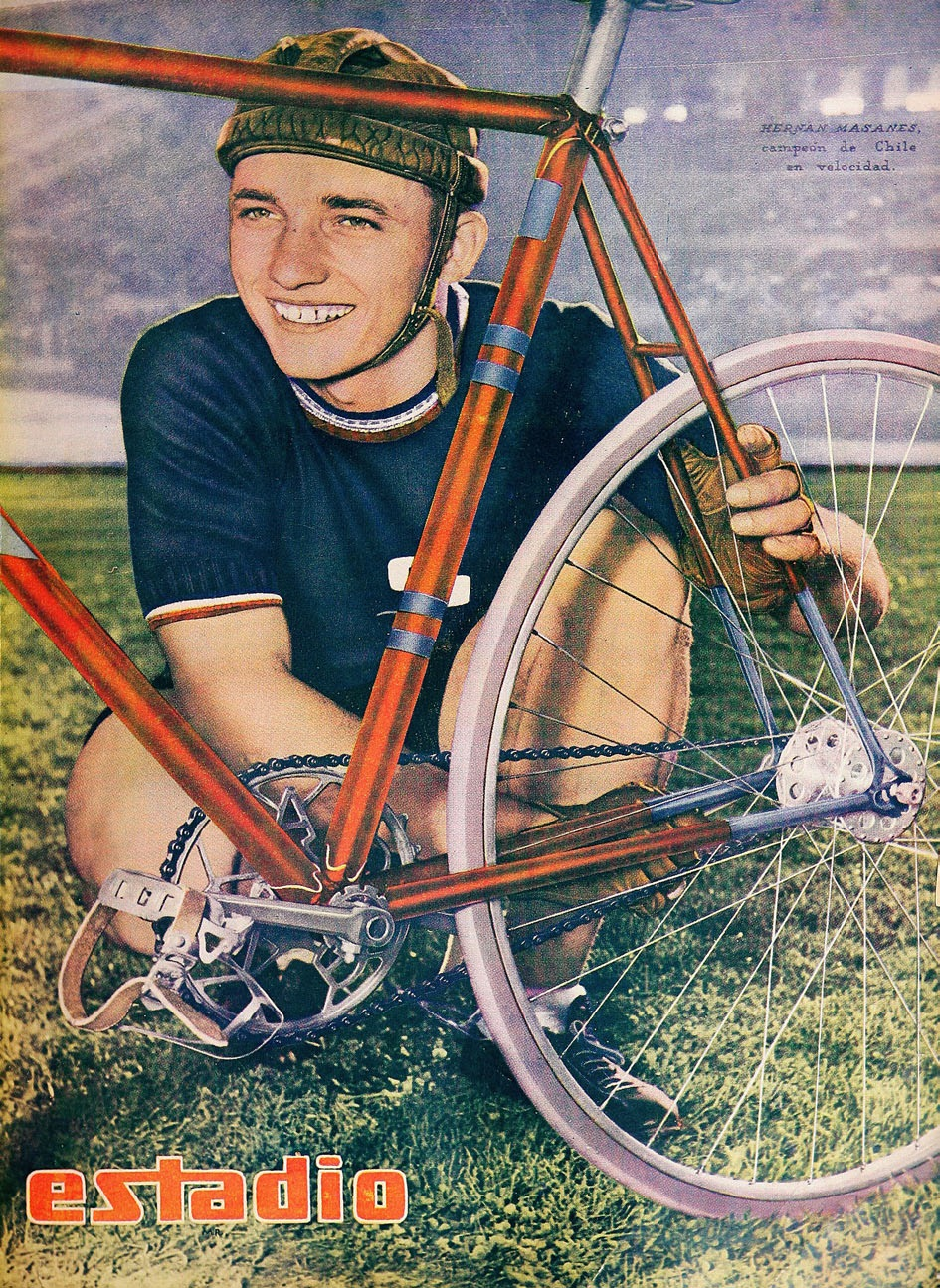

Personal information
- Born: 2 October 1931
- Died: 8 August 2018 (aged 86)

Cycling career
- Sport: Cycling

Hernán Masanés (2 October 1931 – 8 August 2018) was a Chilean cyclist. He competed at the 1952 and 1956 Summer Olympics.
