= Guillermo Vecchio =

Argentine professional basketball head coach

Guillermo Edgardo Vecchio (born March 9, 1961, in Buenos Aires, Argentina) is an Argentine professional basketball head coach.

== Club coaching career ==
Vecchio began his coaching career in Lanus, and then moved to the Argentine League club Obras Sanitarias, where he won the William Jones World Cup in 1983. He moved to the Puerto Rican League, for 3 years with Coamo.

He also was a senior scout for the Detroit Pistons of the NBA.

== National team coaching career ==
Vecchio coached the senior men's Argentine national team between 1991 and 1996.
