= Hernán Raffo =

Chilean basketball player

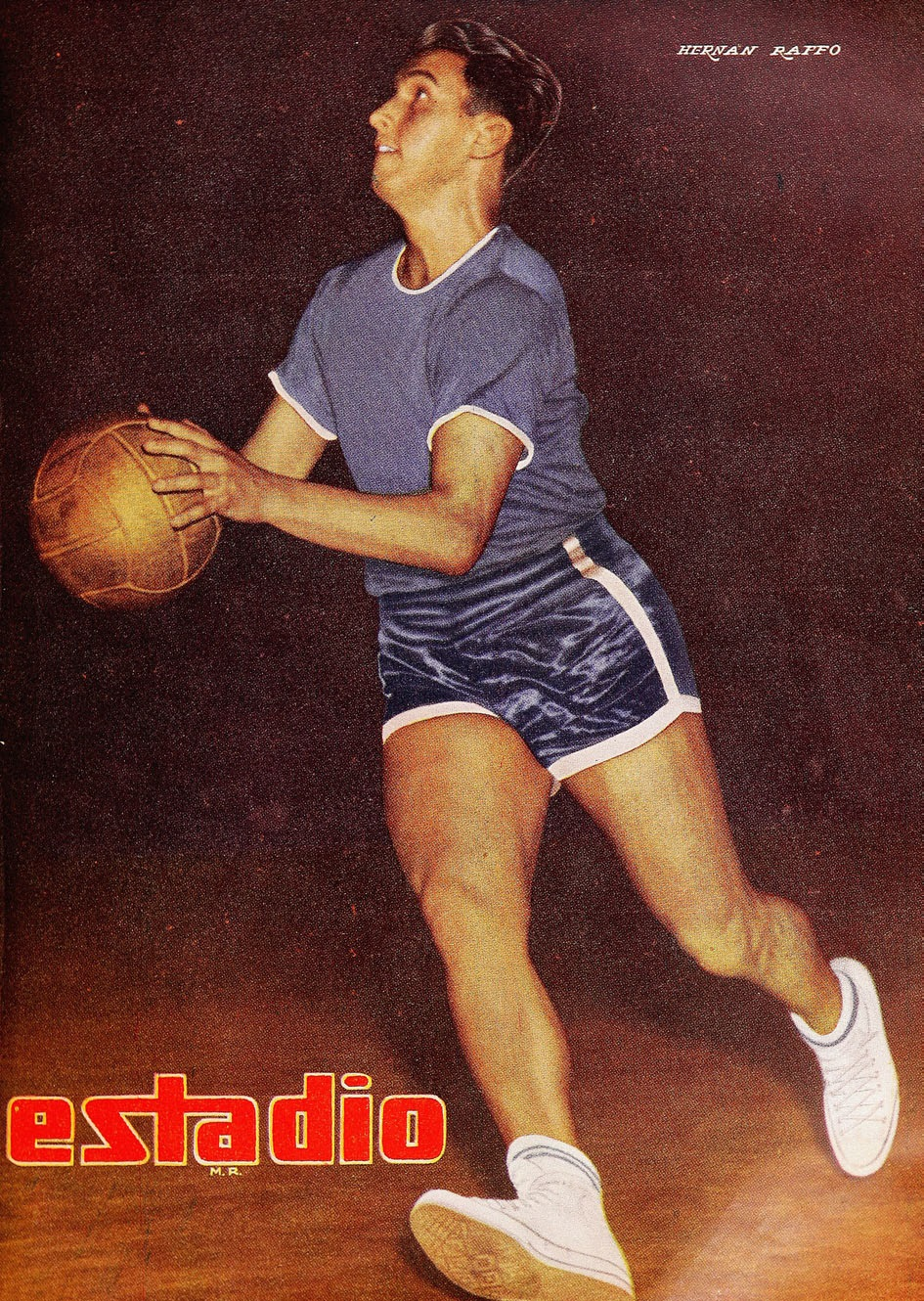

Personal information
- Born: 2 July 1929; Valparaíso, Chile
- Died: 24 July 2012 (aged 83); Villa Alemana, Chile

Sport
- Sport: Basketball

Hernán Leopoldo Raffo Abarca (2 July 1929 – 24 July 2012) was a Chilean basketball player. He competed in the men's tournament at the 1948 Summer Olympics, the 1952 Summer Olympics and the 1956 Summer Olympics.
