= Hernán Ramos =

Chilean basketball player (1929–1992)

Personal information
- Full name: Hernán Ramos Muñoz
- Nationality: Chilean
- Born: 29 April 1929
- Died: 17 September 1992 (aged 63) La Reina, Chile

Sport
- Sport: Basketball

Hernán Ramos Muñoz (29 April 1929 – 17 September 1992) was a Chilean basketball player. He competed in the men's tournament at the 1952 Summer Olympics. Ramos died in La Reina, Chile on 17 September 1992, at the age of 63.
