= Juan Ostoic =

Chilean basketball player (1931–2020)

Personal information
- Full name: Juan Benito Ostoic Ostojic
- Born: 21 March 1931 Huara, Chile
- Died: 25 June 2020 (aged 89) Santiago, Chile

Sport
- Sport: Basketball

Juan Benito Ostoic Ostojic (21 March 1931 – 25 June 2020), known as Juan Ostoic, was a Chilean basketball player. He competed in the men's tournament at the 1952 Summer Olympics and the 1956 Summer Olympics.

After his playing career, Ostoic became a coach, leading Unión Española to multiple Chilean titles. He also served as an assistant for the Chilean national basketball team.

Ostoic also created crossword puzzles for the La Tercera newspaper since 1981 under the pseudonym "Jota O".
