= Rufino Bernedo =

Chilean basketball player (1926–2006)

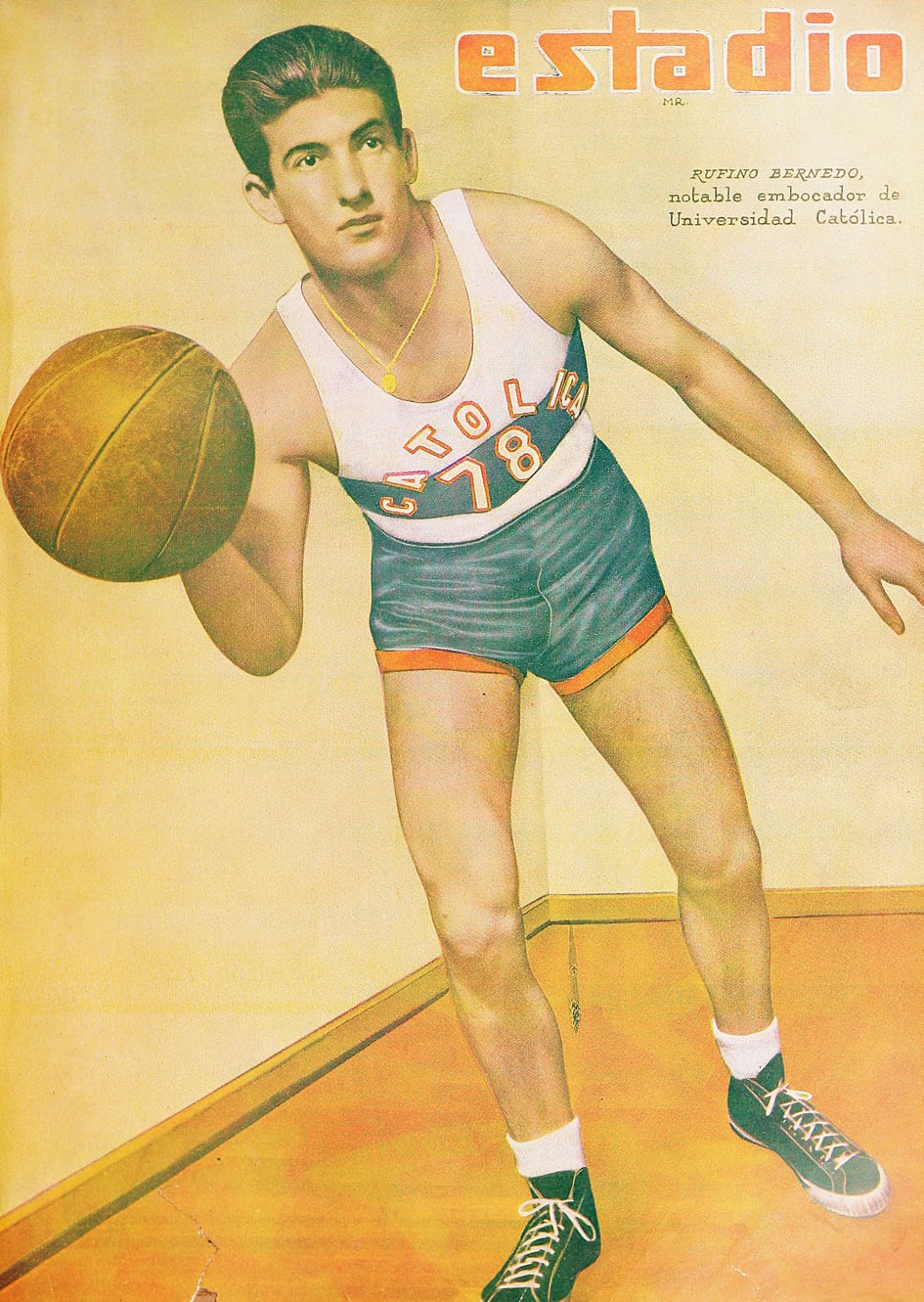

Personal information
- Born: 21 December 1926 Freire, Chile
- Died: 3 February 2006 (aged 79) Temuco, Chile
- Listed height: 172 cm (5 ft 8 in)
- Listed weight: 75 kg (165 lb)

Career information
- Playing career: 1945–1959
- Position: Small forward
- Number: 37, 78

Career history
- 1946–1950: Universidad Católica
Medals
Men's Basketball
Representing Chile
FIBA World Cup
| Bronze medal – third place | 1950 Argentina |
| Bronze medal – third place | 1959 Chile |

Rufino "Chico" Bernedo Zorzano (21 December 1926 – 3 February 2006) was a Chilean basketball player. At a height of 1.72 m (5'7 3/4") tall, he played at the small forward position. He is considered to be among the best Chilean basketball players ever. In November 2013, Sebastián Piñera, the President of Chile, inaugurated a sports center bearing his name, in his honor, in the city of Temuco.

== Club career ==
Bernedo played club basketball in Chile with Universidad Católica (Basket UC) between 1946 and 1950.

== National team career ==
Bernedo was the long-time captain of the senior men's Chilean national basketball team. With Chile, he competed at the men's basketball tournaments at the 1952 Summer Olympics and the 1956 Summer Olympics. With Chile's national team, he also won bronze medals at the 1950 FIBA World Championship and the 1959 FIBA World Championship. He also played at the 1958 FIBA South American Championship.

== Personal life ==
Bernedo was known by the nicknames "Chico", "El Petizo", and "El Rufo". Bernedo died on 3 February 2006, at the age of 79, due to heart failure.
