= Pedro Araya (basketball) =

Chilean basketball player (1925–1998)

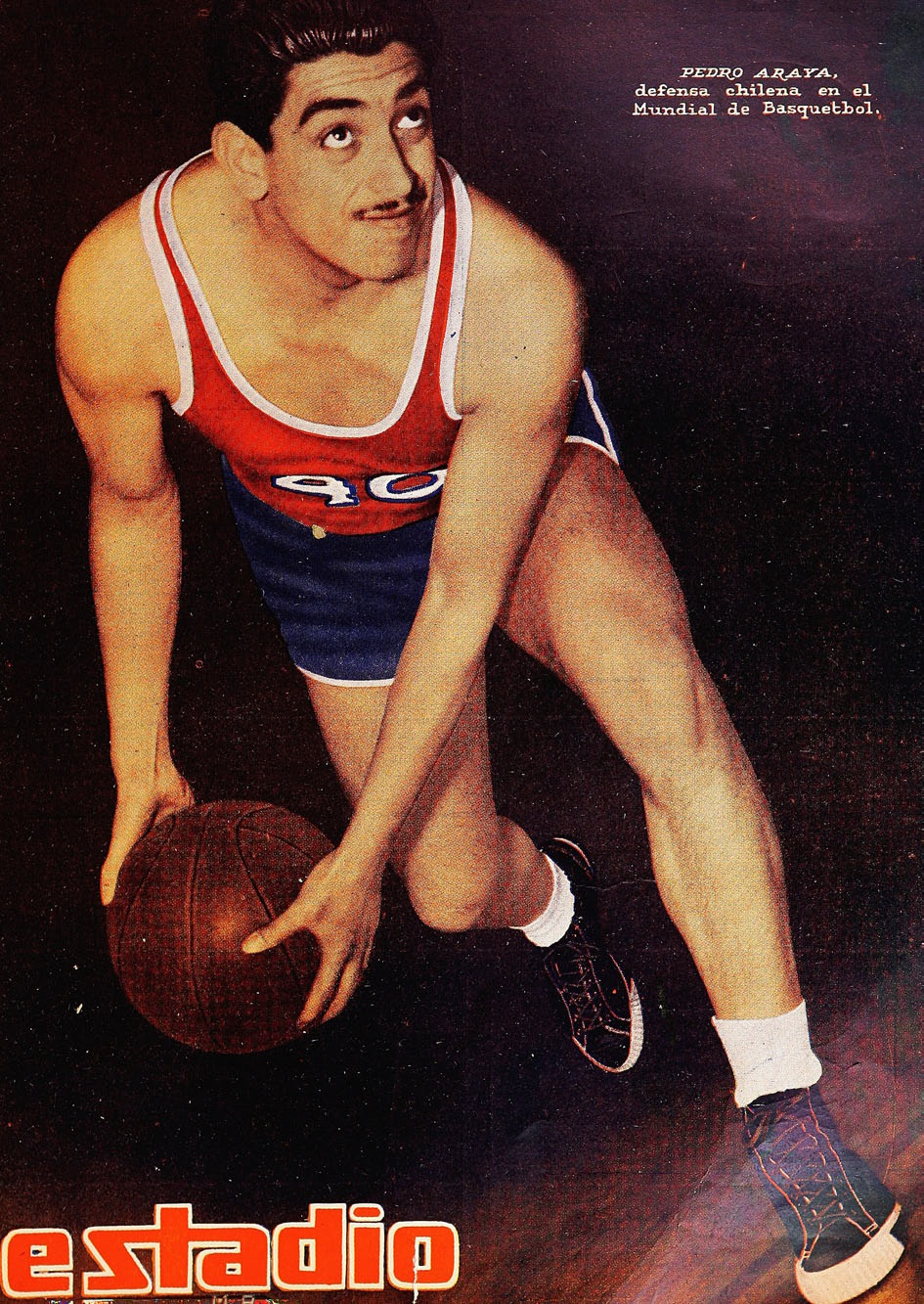

Personal information
- Born: 25 July 1925 Santiago, Chile
- Died: 22 December 1998 (aged 73) Santiago, Chile

Sport
- Sport: Basketball

Pedro Segundo Araya Zavala (25 July 1925 – 22 December 1998) was a Chilean basketball player. He competed in the men's tournament at the 1952 Summer Olympics and the 1956 Summer Olympics.
