= Rolando Etchepare =

Chilean basketball player (1929–2004)

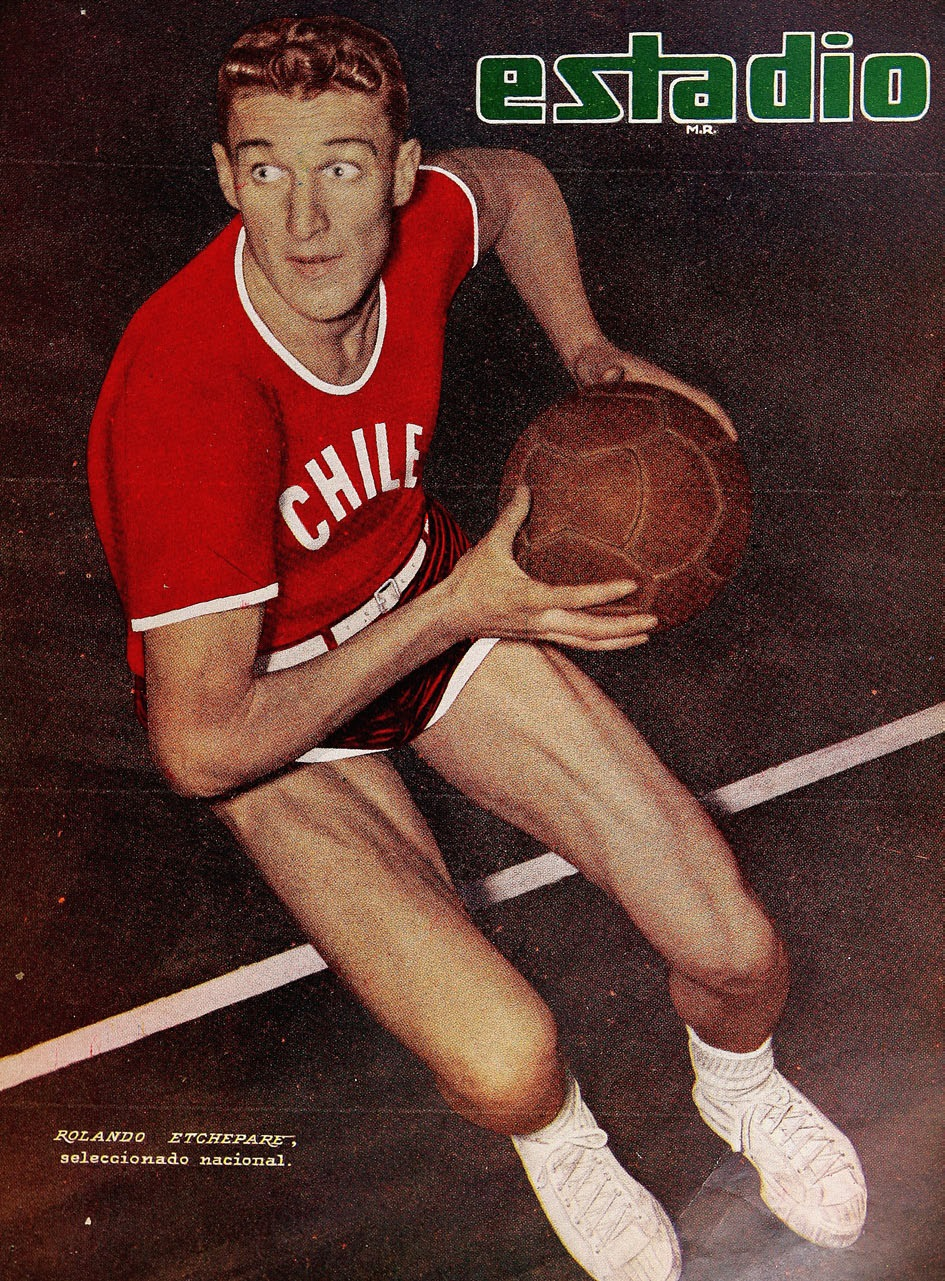

Personal information
- Born: 6 October 1929; Concepción, Chile
- Died: 1 July 2004 (aged 74)

Sport
- Sport: Basketball

Rolando Sergio Etchepare Harismendy (6 October 1929 – 1 July 2004) was a Chilean basketball player. He competed in the men's tournament at the 1956 Summer Olympics.
