= Orlando Silva (basketball) =

Chilean basketball player (1929–1989)

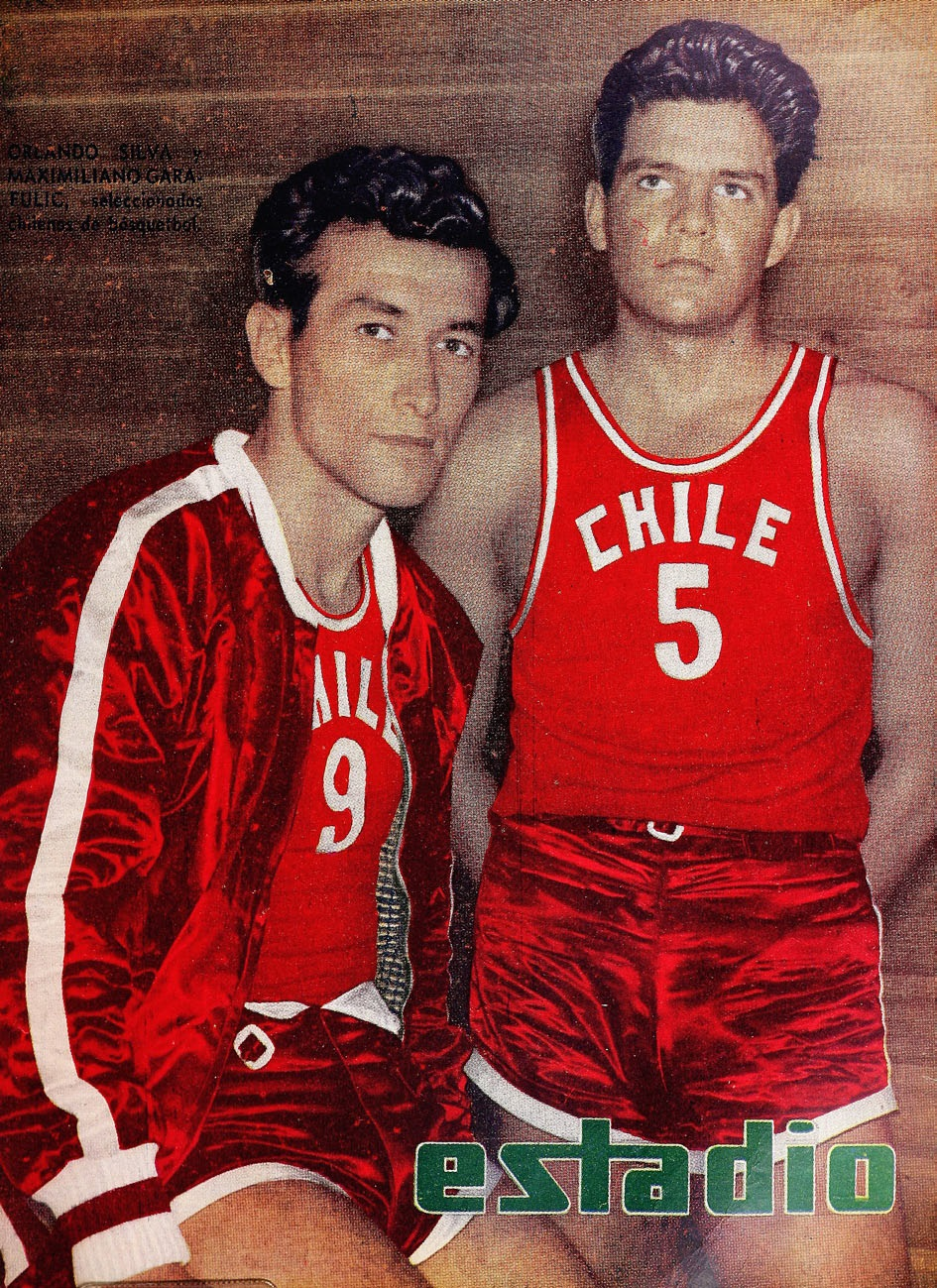

Personal information
- Born: 29 April 1929 Antofagasta, Chile
- Died: 17 October 1989 (aged 60) Santiago, Chile

Sport
- Sport: Basketball

Orlando Silva Infante (29 April 1929 – 17 October 1989) was a Chilean basketball player. He competed in the men's tournament at the 1952 Summer Olympics and the 1956 Summer Olympics. Silva died in Santiago on 17 October 1989, at the age of 60.
