= Chile men's national basketball team =

Men's national basketball team representing Chile

Chile
- FIBA ranking: 60 ▲1 (13 July 2026)
- Joined FIBA: 1935; 91 years ago
- FIBA zone: FIBA Americas
- National federation: Chile Basketball Federation
- Coach: Juan Manuel Córdoba
- Nickname: La Roja

Olympic Games
- Appearances: 4
- Medals: None

FIBA World Cup
- Appearances: 3
- Medals: (bronze) Bronze: 1950, 1959

FIBA AmeriCup
- Appearances: None
Home	Away
Medal record
FIBA World Cup
Bronze medal – third place	1950 Argentina	Team
Bronze medal – third place	1959 Chile	Team
South American Basketball Championship
Gold medal – first place	1937 Chile	Team
Silver medal – second place	1932 Chile	Team
Silver medal – second place	1934 Argentina	Team
Bronze medal – third place	1942 Chile	Team
Bronze medal – third place	1947 Brazil	Team
Bronze medal – third place	1949 Paraguay	Team
Bronze medal – third place	1953 Uruguay	Team

The Chile national basketball team is controlled by the Federación de Básquetbol de Chile. It is affiliated to FIBA, under the zone confederation of FIBA Americas.

In the 1950s, Chile had one of the finest national basketball teams in the world. In more recent years team has primarily competed regionally at the FIBA South American Championship.

== History ==
=== Past years ===
The team has a distinguished history in international and regional competitions, with notable successes in the FIBA World Cup and the FIBA South American Championships. In the FIBA World Cup, Chile won two bronze medals: the first in the first ever World Cup in 1950 played in Buenos Aires, Argentina and another in 1959 when Chile hosted the tournament.

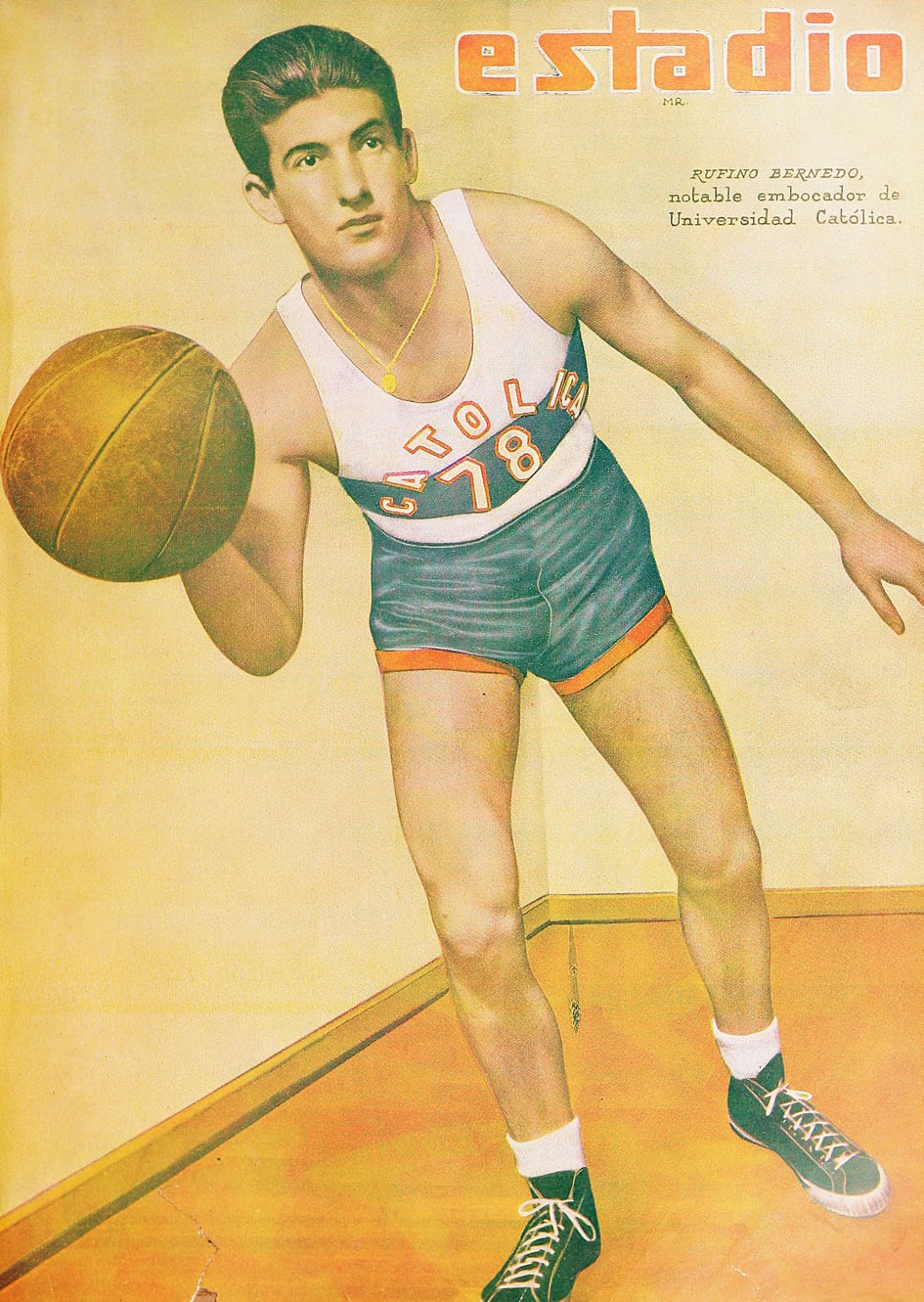
Rufino Bernedo, was part of the team of 1950 and 1959.

In the South American Championship, Chile achieved its peak performance with a gold medal in 1937 on home soil. They also secured silver in 1932 and 1934, along with several bronze medals in the 1940s and 1950s, underlining their regional strength. The team won bronze medals in 1942 (Chile), 1947 (Brazil), 1949 (Paraguay), and 1953 (Uruguay), proving their consistency in regional competitions during that era, being considered one of the strong teams of FIBA Americas.

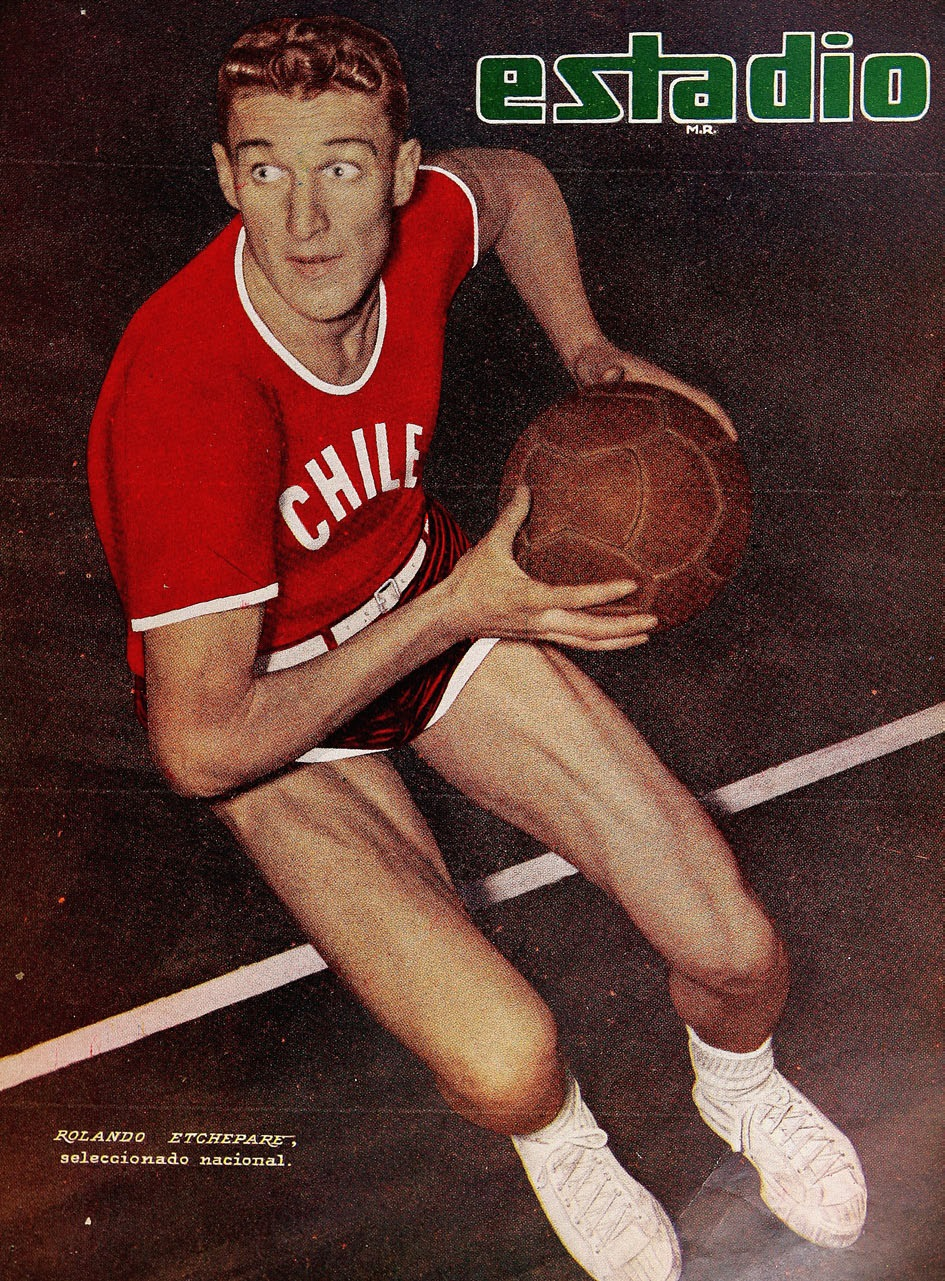
Rolando Etchepare, was part of the team of 1959 FIBA World Cup third-place.

Additionally, Chile's performances in the South American Games have been impressive in more recent years. They clinched gold in 2022 in Paraguay, building on a series of strong performances, which included silver in 2014 when the games were held in Chile, and bronze medals in 1982 (Argentina), 2010 (Colombia), and 2018 (Bolivia). These achievements highlight Chile's resilience and ongoing competitiveness in basketball throughout various decades.

Though the team has struggled to maintain a dominant presence on the global stage, they have qualified for several major tournaments, including the Olympic Games and multiple FIBA World Cups. Despite recent challenges, the Chilean team remains an important part of basketball's development in South America. The competitive record section highlights their journey and involvement in various competitions like the FIBA AmeriCup and Pan American Games.

=== Recent years ===
The Chile men's national basketball team is currently in a rebuilding phase, striving to regain their former competitiveness on the international stage. While the team has faced challenges in recent years, including inconsistent performances in major tournaments such as the FIBA World Cup qualifiers, there is renewed focus on developing young talent and improving their regional standing in South America with players like Sebastián Herrera, Franco Morales, Gerardo Isla, Nico Carvacho or Manny Suárez as important players of this era.

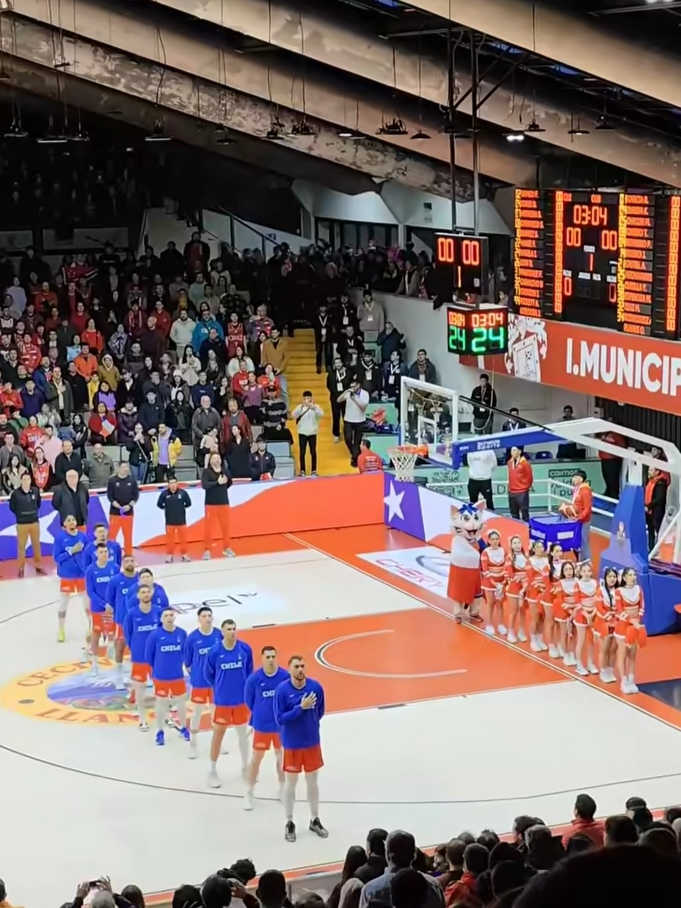
Chile in the handshake against Cuba for the 2027 FIBA World Cup pre-qualifiers.

Despite team efforts and a historic 79–77 victory over Argentina in Valdivia, failed to qualify for the 2025 FIBA AmeriCup. The team faced a highly competitive group that included regional powerhouses Argentina, Colombia, and Venezuela. Although a memorable home victory briefly raised hopes, key defeats ultimately sealed its fate, including a 63–54 loss to Colombia and a narrow 73–72 overtime defeat to Venezuela in the final match.

== Stadium ==
Coliseo Municipal Antonio Azurmendy Riveros
- La Catedral
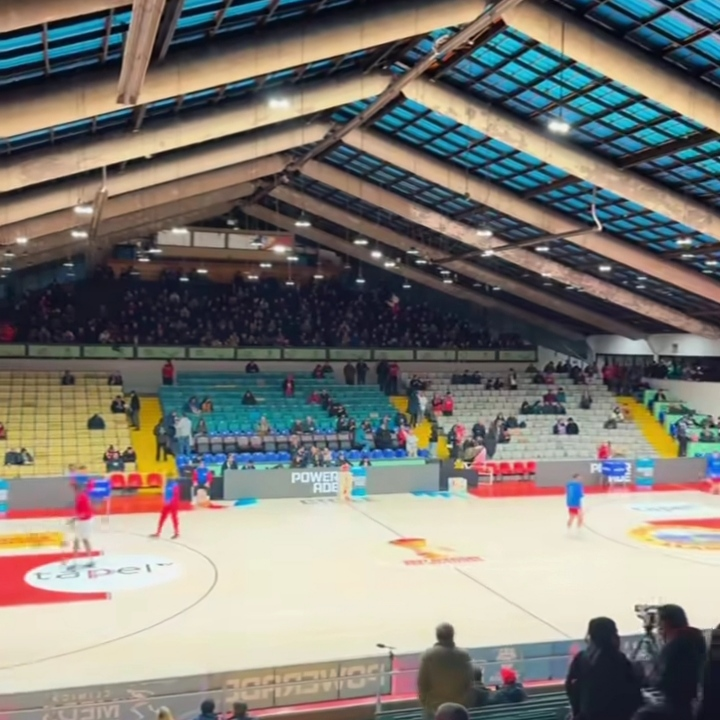
- Capacity: 5,000

Construction
- Opened: 1966

The Coliseo Municipal Antonio Azurmendy Riveros, also known as La Catedral, located in Valdivia, Chile, is a prominent indoor sports arena that plays a key role in hosting Chilean basketball events. With a seating capacity of about 5,000, it has been a frequent venue for domestic and international competitions, making it a significant home court for the Chilean team. Its intimate yet vibrant atmosphere makes it ideal for high-stakes basketball games, fostering strong support for the home team.

The Chilean men's national basketball team has utilized the Coliseo for numerous tournaments and training sessions. As a key sports hub in the region, the venue has hosted pivotal games in the team's competitive history, including preparations for international events like the FIBA World Cup qualifiers.

Its central role in national basketball reflects the importance of local infrastructure in supporting Chile's basketball development on both a regional and international level.

== Competitive record ==
=== Olympic Games ===
Year	Position	Tournament	Host
1936	9	Basketball at the 1936 Summer Olympics	(Nazi Germany) Berlin, Germany
1948	6	Basketball at the 1948 Summer Olympics	London, United Kingdom
1952	5	Basketball at the 1952 Summer Olympics	Helsinki, Finland
1956	8	Basketball at the 1956 Summer Olympics	Melbourne, Australia

=== FIBA World Cup ===
Year	Position	Tournament	Host
1950	(bronze) 3	1950 FIBA World Championship	Buenos Aires, Argentina
1954	10	1954 FIBA World Championship	Rio de Janeiro, Brazil
1959	(bronze) 3	1959 FIBA World Championship	Chile
2027	To be determined	2027 FIBA Basketball World Cup	Qatar

=== FIBA AmeriCup ===
yet to qualify

=== Pan American Games ===
- 1951 : 5th
- 2019 : Did not qualify
- 2023 : 5th

=== FIBA South American Championship ===
- 1930 : 4th
- 1932 : (silver)
- 1934 : (silver)
- 1935 : Did not participate
- 1937 : (gold)
- 1938 : Did not participate
- 1939 : 5th
- 1940 : 4th
- 1941 : 4th
- 1942 : (bronze)
- 1943 : 4th
- 1945 : 4th
- 1947 : (bronze)
- 1949 : (bronze)
- 1953 : (bronze)
- 1955 : 6th
- 1958 : 5th
- 1960 : 5th
- 1961 : 6th
- 1963 : 7th
- 1966 : 6th
- 1968 : 6th
- 1969 : 5th
- 1971 : 6th
- 1973 : 5th
- 1976 : 6th
- 1977 : 6th
- 1979 : 4th
- 1981 : 4th
- 1983 : 5th
- 1985 : 7th
- 1987 : 6th
- 1989–1993 : Did not participate
- 1995 : 6th
- 1997 : 6th
- 1999 : 7th
- 2001 : 6th
- 2003 : 5th
- 2004 : 5th
- 2006 : 6th
- 2008 : 6th
- 2010 : 7th
- 2012 : 6th
- 2014 : 6th
- 2016 : 7th

== Results and fixtures ==
=== Matches ===
Date	City	Competition	Home	Result	Away
23 June 2023	(Chile) Valdivia	2025 FIBA AmeriCup qualification	Chile	85:63	Ecuador
24 June 2023	(Chile) Valdivia	2025 FIBA AmeriCup qualification	Barbados	48:78	Chile
25 June 2023	(Chile) Valdivia	2025 FIBA AmeriCup qualification	Chile	112:47	Paraguay
14 August 2023	(Argentina) La Banda	2024 Olympics qualifiers	Virgin Islands	61:62	Chile
15 August 2023	(Argentina) La Banda	2024 Olympics qualifiers	Chile	78:70	Uruguay
17 August 2023	(Argentina) La Banda	2024 Olympics qualifiers	Chile	77:65	Colombia
19 August 2023	(Argentina) Santiago del Estero	2024 Olympics qualifiers	Chile	79:87	Argentina
31 October 2023	(Chile) Santiago	2023 Pan American Games	Chile	66:70	Puerto Rico
1 November 2023	(Chile) Santiago	2023 Pan American Games	Brazil	94:43	Chile
2 November 2023	(Chile) Santiago	2023 Pan American Games	Chile	63:59	Mexico
3 November 2023	(Chile) Santiago	2023 Pan American Games	Dominican Republic	75:83	Chile
22 February 2024	(Argentina) Mar del Plata	2025 FIBA AmeriCup qualification	Argentina	90:78	Chile
25 February 2024	(Chile) Valdivia	2025 FIBA AmeriCup qualification	Chile	79:77	Argentina
22 November 2024	(Chile) Valdivia	2025 FIBA AmeriCup qualification	Chile	74:80	Colombia
25 November 2024	(Chile) Valdivia	2025 FIBA AmeriCup qualification	Chile	86:61	Venezuela
20 February 2025	(Colombia) Cali	2025 FIBA AmeriCup qualification	Colombia	97:91	Chile
23 February 2025	(Venezuela) Caracas	2025 FIBA AmeriCup qualification	Venezuela	73:72	Chile

== Players ==
=== Current squad ===
The following players were called up to the squad for the 2025 FIBA AmeriCup qualification matches against Colombia and Venezuela on 22 and 25 November 2024, respectively.

Chile
No.	Player	Pos.	Height	Age	Team
2	Felipe Inyaco	PG	2,02 m	32	(Argentina) Obras Basket
4	Darrol Jones	F	1,95 m	29	(Chile) Leones de Quilpué
7	Sebastián Herrera	F	1,93 m	27	(France) Paris Basketball
8	Sebastián Carrasco	PG	1,80 m	23	(Chile) Universidad de Concepción
9	Franco Morales	G	1,79 m	32	(Chile) ABA Ancud
19	Ignacio Carrión	G	1,90 m	24	(Chile) Leones de Quilpué
22	Felipe Haase	PF	2,05 m	25	Mexico City Capitanes
23	Kevin Rubio	F	1,93 m	24	(Chile) Universidad de Concepción
24	Ignacio Arroyo-Varela	G	1,85 m	23	(Spain) Monbus Obradoiro
28	Diego Low	PF	1,90 m	26	(Chile) Universidad de Concepción
31	Fabián Martínez	PF	1,94 m	24	(Argentina) Comunicaciones
32	Nicolás Carvacho	C	2,08 m	26	(Portugal) Benfica
44	Manny Suárez	C	2,08 m	30	(Uruguay) Nacional
99	Aitor Pickett	PF	2,03 m	24	(Germany) Kirchheim Knights

=== National team rosters ===
Chile national basketball team rosters

== Coaches ==
=== Current staff ===
Position	Name
Head coach	Juan Manuel Córdoba
Assistant coach	Carlos Zúñiga
Assistant coach	Guillermo Maurino

=== Past head coaches ===
- (Chile) Erasmo López: 1932, 1936
- (Chile) Jesús Magaña: 1937
- (Chile) Fernando Primard: 1939
- (Chile) Carlos Salamovich: 1940
- (Mexico) Pedro Ascencio: 1941
- (Mexico) Alfonso Barra Ponce: 1942
- (United States) Kenneth Davidson: 1943-1947
- (Chile) Luis Valenzuela: 1948
- (Chile) Osvaldo Retamal: 1949
- (United States) Kenneth Davidson / (Chile) Luis Valenzuela: 1950
- (Chile) Osvaldo Retamal / (Chile) Sergio Molinari: 1952
- (Chile) Juan Yovanovic: 1953
- (United States) Kenneth Davidson / (Chile) Juan Arredondo: 1954
- (Chile) Exequiel Figueroa: 1955
- (Chile) Juan Arredondo: 1956
- (Chile) Exequiel Figueroa / (Chile) Juan Arredondo: 1958
- (Chile) Luis Valenzuela / (Chile) / Juan Arredondo / (Chile) Exequiel Figueroa: 1959
- (Chile) Raúl López: 1960
- (Chile) Luis Valenzuela: 1961
- (Chile) Gustavo Ortlieb: 1963
- (Soviet Union) Stepan Spandarian: 1965-1966
- (Chile) Luis Valenzuela: 1966
- (Chile) Juan Arredondo: 1968
- (Chile) René Hola: 1969
- (Chile) Luis Valenzuela: 1971
- (United States) Dan Peterson: 1971-1973
- (Chile) Héctor Oreste / (Chile) Luis Pérez: 1976
- (United States) Randy Knowles: 1977
- (Chile) Renato Raggio: 1979-1985
- (Chile) Héctor Oreste: 1987
- (Chile) Juan Morales: 1993
- (Chile) Miguel Ureta: 1995
- (Chile) Juan Morales: 1997-2001
- (Argentina) Daniel Allende: 2002-2003
- (Chile) Miguel Ureta: 2004
- (Argentina) Daniel Allende: 2006-2008
- (Argentina) Juan Manuel Córdoba: 2010-2011
- (Argentina) Guillermo Vecchio: 2012
- (Chile) Cipriano Núñez: 2014
- (Argentina) Daniel Frola: 2016
- (Chile) Claudio Jorquera: 2017-2018
- (Argentina) Jorge Luis Álvarez: 2018-2019
- (Argentina) Daniel Frola: 2019
- (Argentina) Christian Santander: 2019-2022
- (Argentina) Juan Manuel Córdoba: 2023-

== See also ==
- Chile men's national under-15 and under-16 basketball team
- Chile men's national under-17 and under-18 basketball team
- Chile women's national basketball team
