= 2005 FIBA Americas Championship squads =

This article displays the rosters for the participating teams at the 2005 FIBA Americas Championship.

== Group A ==
=== Brazil ===
Brazil men's national basketball team roster
Players
Coaches

Pos.	No.	Name	Age – Date of birth	Height	Club	Ctr.
G	4	Marcelinho Machado	30 – 12 April 1975	2.00 m (6 ft 7 in)	Uberlândia	(Brazil)
G	5	Nezinho dos Santos	24 – 21 January 1981	1.85 m (6 ft 1 in)	COC-Ribeirão Preto	(Brazil)
C	6	Murilo Becker	22 – 14 July 1983	2.07 m (6 ft 9 in)	Franca	(Brazil)
G	7	Marcelinho Huertas	22 – 25 May 1983	1.90 m (6 ft 3 in)	Joventut Badalona	(Spain)
G	8	Leandro Barbosa	22 – 28 November 1982	1.94 m (6 ft 4 in)	Phoenix Suns	(United States)
F	9	Jefferson Da Silva	22 – 29 March 1983	2.07 m (6 ft 9 in)	Paulistano	(Brazil)
G/F	10	Alex Garcia	25 – 4 March 1980	1.92 m (6 ft 4 in)	COC Ribeirão Preto	(Brazil)
C	11	Anderson Varejão	22 – 28 September 1982	2.11 m (6 ft 11 in)	FC Barcelona	(Spain)
F	12	Guilherme Giovannoni	25 – 2 June 1980	2.08 m (6 ft 10 in)	Treviso Basket	(Italy)
C	13	Rafael Hettsheimeir	19 – 18 June 1986	2.09 m (6 ft 10 in)	Akasvayu Vic	(Spain)
C	14	Caio Torres	18 – 3 June 1987	2.11 m (6 ft 11 in)	Adecco Estudiantes	(Spain)
F	15	Tiago Splitter	20 – 1 January 1985	2.11 m (6 ft 11 in)	Tau Cerámica	(Spain)

Head coach

- (Brazil) Lula Ferreira

Legend

- Club – describes last
  club before the tournament
- Age – describes age
  on August 24, 2005

=== Canada ===
Canada men's national basketball team roster
Players
Coaches

Pos.	No.	Name	Age – Date of birth	Height	Club	Ctr.
G	4	Jermaine Anderson	22 – February 8, 1983	6 ft 2 in (1.88 m)	Fordham Rams	(United States)
G	5	Denham Brown	22 – January 6, 1983	6 ft 5 in (1.96 m)	University of Connecticut	(United States)
G	6	James Gillingham	24 – August 20, 1981	6 ft 4 in (1.93 m)	TBB Trier	(Germany)
G	7	Randall Nohr	28 – June 26, 1977	6 ft 1 in (1.85 m)	Fribourg Olympic	(Switzerland)
G	8	Carl English	24 – February 2, 1981	6 ft 5 in (1.96 m)	Florida Flame	(United States)
F	9	Levon Kendall	21 – July 4, 1984	6 ft 11 in (2.11 m)	University of Pittsburgh	(United States)
C	10	Nathan Doornekamp	22 – October 9, 1982	6 ft 11 in (2.11 m)	TBB Trier	(Germany)
F	11	Vidal Massiah	26 – February 1, 1979	6 ft 7 in (2.01 m)	Oliveirense Caçarola	(Portugal)
G	12	Richard Anderson	27 – November 30, 1977	6 ft 6 in (1.98 m)	Kraftwerk Wels	(Austria)
F	13	Juan Mendez	23 – September 23, 1981	6 ft 8 in (2.03 m)	Niagara University	(Italy)
F	14	Jermaine Bucknor	21 – November 1, 1983	6 ft 7 in (2.01 m)	University of Richmond	(United States)
C	15	Kevin Jobity	30 – November 21, 1974	6 ft 10 in (2.08 m)	Champville	(Lebanon)

Head coach

- (Canada) Leo Rautins

Assistant coach(es)

- (Canada) David Smart
- (Canada) Greg Francis

Legend

- Club – describes last
  club before the tournament
- Age – describes age
  on August 24, 2005

=== Panama ===
Panama men's national basketball team roster
Players
Coaches

Pos.	No.	Name	Age – Date of birth	Height	Club	Ctr.
G	4	Joel Muñoz	25 – June 24, 1980	5 ft 10 in (1.78 m)	John Brown University	(United States)
G	5	Jair Peralta	29 – January 5, 1976	5 ft 11 in (1.8 m)	Canguros de Parque Lefevre	(Panama)
F	6	Danilo Pinnock	21 – December 11, 1983	6 ft 6 in (1.98 m)	GW Colonials	(United States)
G	7	Maximiliano Gómez	29 – December 18, 1975	6 ft 4 in (1.93 m)	Toros del Chorrillo	(Panama)
G	8	Eduardo Isaac	25 – February 11, 1980	5 ft 11 in (1.8 m)	Navieros de Colon	(Panama)
F	9	Chris Warren	24 – January 19, 1981	6 ft 5 in (1.96 m)	KK Reflex	(Serbia and Montenegro)
F	10	Reyjavick De Gracia	23 – November 5, 1981	6 ft 8 in (2.03 m)	John Brown University	(United States)
F	11	Michael Hicks	16 – June 30, 1989	6 ft 5 in (1.96 m)	Agricola Glroai Montecatini	(Italy)
F	12	Dionisio Gómez	25 – April 7, 1980	6 ft 8 in (2.03 m)	Central Entrerriano	(Argentina)
F	13	Antonio García	29 – May 11, 1976	6 ft 8 in (2.03 m)	Club Deportivo Quevedo	(Ecuador)
F/C	14	Jaime Lloreda	24 – October 11, 1980	6 ft 8 in (2.03 m)	Pınar Karşıyaka	(Turkey)
F	15	Eric Cardenas	31 – November 29, 1973	6 ft 9 in (2.06 m)	ESPE Quito	(Ecuador)

Head coach

- (United States) Nolan Richardson

Assistant coach(es)

- (Panama) Enrique Grenald
- (Panama) Raúl Pineda

Legend

- nat field describes country
  of last club
  before the tournament
- Age field is age on August 24, 2005

=== United States ===
United States men's national basketball team roster
Players
Coaches

Pos.	No.	Name	Age – Date of birth	Height	Club
G	4	Tyus Edney	32 – 14 February 1973	5 ft 10 in (1.78 m)	Lottomatica Roma	(Italy)
G	5	Marque Perry	24 – 28 January 1981	6 ft 1 in (1.85 m)	Olympiacos	(Greece)
G	6	Lynn Greer	25 – 23 October 1979	6 ft 1 in (1.85 m)	Pompea Napoli	(Italy)
G	7	Charlie Bell	26 – 12 March 1979	6 ft 4 in (1.93 m)	Milwaukee Bucks	(United States)
G	8	Alex Scales	27 – 3 July 1978	6 ft 3 in (1.91 m)	Seoul Samsung Thunders	(South Korea)
F	9	Tang Hamilton	27 – 26 May 1978	6 ft 7 in (2.01 m)	Fayetteville Patriots	(United States)
F	10	Ron Slay	24 – 29 June 1981	6 ft 8 in (2.03 m)	Asheville Altitude	(United States)
C	11	Adam Chubb	24 – 5 July 1981	6 ft 10 in (2.08 m)	Ulsan Mobis Phoebus	(South Korea)
C	12	Noel Felix	23 – 4 October 1981	6 ft 9 in (2.06 m)	Talk 'N Text Phone Pals	(Philippines)
F	13	Aaron McGhee	26 – 28 June 1979	6 ft 8 in (2.03 m)	Busan KTF Magic Wings	(South Korea)
C	14	Jerome Beasley	25 – 17 May 1980	6 ft 10 in (2.08 m)	Sioux Falls Skyforce	(United States)
C	15	Kris Lang	25 – 12 December 1979	6 ft 11 in (2.11 m)	Caffe Maxim Virtus Bologna	(Italy)

Head coach

- (United States) Morris McHone

Assistant coach(es)

- (United States) Dennis Johnson
- (United States) Joey Meyer

Legend

- Club – describes last
  club before the tournament
- Age – describes age
  on August 24, 2005

=== Venezuela ===
Venezuela men's national basketball team roster
Players
Coaches

Pos.	No.	Name	Age – Date of birth	Height	Club	Ctr.
F	4	Víctor Díaz	37 – 2 April 1968	1.98 m (6 ft 6 in)	Cocodrilos de Caracas	(Venezuela)
F	5	Luis Julio	25 – 12 June 1980	1.96 m (6 ft 5 in)	Gaiteros del Zulia	(Venezuela)
G	6	Ernesto Mijares	28 – 30 September 1976	1.91 m (6 ft 3 in)	Marinos de Anzoátegui	(Venezuela)
C	7	Richard Lugo	28 – 30 September 1976	2.07 m (6 ft 9 in)	Capitanes de Arecibo	(Puerto Rico)
F/C	8	Tomás Aguilera	27 – 25 September 1977	1.97 m (6 ft 6 in)	Cocodrilos de Caracas	(Venezuela)
G	9	Óscar Torres	28 – 18 December 1976	1.98 m (6 ft 6 in)	BC Khimki	(Russia)
G	10	Askia Jones	33 – 19 December 1971	1.96 m (6 ft 5 in)	Guaros de Lara	(Venezuela)
C	11	Miguel Ángel Marriaga	21 – 6 June 1984	2.06 m (6 ft 9 in)	Gaiteros del Zulia	(Venezuela)
F	12	Héctor Romero	25 – 3 January 1980	2.02 m (6 ft 8 in)	Marinos de Anzoátegui	(Venezuela)
G	13	Diego Guevara	27 – 26 April 1978	1.86 m (6 ft 1 in)	Guaros de Lara	(Venezuela)
C	14	Heberth Bayona	27 – 26 April 1978	2.11 m (6 ft 11 in)	Guaiqueríes de Margarita	(Venezuela)
G/F	15	Carlos Morris	29 – 10 November 1975	1.95 m (6 ft 5 in)	Gatos de Monagas	(Venezuela)

Head coach

- (Venezuela) Néstor Salazar

Assistant coach(es)

- (Venezuela) Nelson Solorzano
- (Venezuela) Carlos Gil

Legend

- Club – describes last
  club before the tournament
- Age – describes age
  on August 24, 2005

== Group B ==
=== Argentina ===
Argentina men's national basketball team roster
Players
Coaches

Pos.	No.	Name	Age – Date of birth	Height	Club	Ctr.
G	4	Antonio Porta	21 – 28 October 1983	1.90 m (6 ft 3 in)	Villaggio Solidago Livorno	(Italy)
G	5	Julio Mázzaro	26 – 31 January 1979	1.90 m (6 ft 3 in)	River Plate	(Argentina)
C	6	Román González	27 – 28 January 1978	2.10 m (6 ft 11 in)	Argentino de Junín	(Argentina)
F	7	Diego Lo Grippo	27 – 22 January 1978	2.00 m (6 ft 7 in)	Alerta Cantabria Lobos	(Spain)
G	8	Daniel Farabello	31 – 18 October 1973	1.98 m (6 ft 6 in)	Casti Group Varese	(Italy)
C	9	Gabriel Fernández	28 – 23 October 1976	2.04 m (6 ft 8 in)	Casti Group Varese	(Italy)
F	10	Leonardo Gutiérrez	27 – 16 May 1978	2.00 m (6 ft 7 in)	Ben Hur	(Argentina)
C	11	Martín Leiva	25 – 23 April 1980	2.10 m (6 ft 11 in)	Boca Juniors	(Argentina)
C	12	Juan Pedro Gutiérrez	21 – 10 October 1983	2.05 m (6 ft 9 in)	Obras Sanitarias	(Argentina)
G	13	Paolo Quinteros	26 – 15 January 1979	1.88 m (6 ft 2 in)	Boca Juniors	(Argentina)
F	14	Hernán Jasen	27 – 4 February 1978	1.99 m (6 ft 6 in)	Adecco Estudiantes	(Spain)
F	15	Federico Kammerichs	25 – 21 June 1980	2.02 m (6 ft 8 in)	Pamesa Valencia	(Spain)

Head coach

- (Argentina) Sergio Hernández

Legend

- nat field describes country
  of last club
  before the tournament
- Age field is age on August 24, 2005

=== Dominican Republic ===
Dominican Republic national basketball team roster
Players
Coaches

Pos.	No.	Name	Age – Date of birth	Height	Club	Ctr.
G	4	Otto Ramírez	30 – 14 November 1974	5 ft 11 in (1.8 m)
C	5	Marlon Martínez	26 – 17 January 1979	6 ft 8 in (2.03 m)	Marineros de Puerto Plata	(Dominican Republic)
G	6	Luis Flores	24 – 11 April 1981	6 ft 2 in (1.88 m)	Denver Nuggets	(United States)
F	7	Andy Turner	24 – 26 December 1980	6 ft 5 in (1.96 m)	Cañeros de La Romana	(Dominican Republic)
C	8	Josh Asselin	26 – 24 December 1978	6 ft 11 in (2.11 m)	Alerta Cantabria Lobos	(Spain)
C	9	Amaury Filion	24 – 1 August 1981	6 ft 9 in (2.06 m)	Metros de Santiago	(Dominican Republic)
G	10	Cristian Arias	23 – 15 November 1981	6 ft 3 in (1.91 m)	Panteras del Distrito Nacional	(Dominican Republic)
F	11	Francisco García	24 – 31 December 1980	6 ft 7 in (2.01 m)	Sacramento Kings	(United States)
C	12	José Vargas	42 – 23 June 1963	6 ft 9 in (2.06 m)	Universo Brasilia	(Brazil)
G	13	Felipe López	30 – 19 December 1974	6 ft 6 in (1.98 m)	Metros de Santiago	(Dominican Republic)
C	14	Jaime Peterson	33 – 29 September 1971	6 ft 9 in (2.06 m)	ALM Évreux Basket	(France)
F	15	Jack Martinez	23 – 12 October 1981	6 ft 8 in (2.03 m)	Atléticos de San Germán	(Puerto Rico)

Head coach

- (United States) Keith Smart

Legend

- Club – describes last
  club before the tournament
- Age – describes age
  on August 24, 2005

=== Mexico ===
Mexico men's national basketball team roster
Players
Coaches

Pos.	No.	Name	Age – Date of birth	Height	Club	Ctr.
G	4	Romel Beck	23 – 29 May 1982	2.01 m (6 ft 7 in)	University of Nevada, Las Vegas	(United States)
C	5	Víctor Ávila	28 – 23 March 1977	2.09 m (6 ft 10 in)	Halcones de Xalapa	(Mexico)
G	6	Anthony Pedroza	26 – 7 March 1979	1.91 m (6 ft 3 in)	Osos de Guadalajara	(Mexico)
C	7	Horacio Llamas	32 – 17 July 1973	2.11 m (6 ft 11 in)	Soles de Mexicali	(Mexico)
F	8	Enrique González	36 – 10 September 1968	2.05 m (6 ft 9 in)	Centauros de Chihuahua	(Mexico)
F	9	Eric Hare	26 – 11 January 1979	1.96 m (6 ft 5 in)	Paskolas de Navojoa	(Mexico)
C	10	Ramsés Benítez	25 – 10 September 1979	2.09 m (6 ft 10 in)	Soles de Mexicali	(Mexico)
G	11	Omar Quintero	23 – 26 September 1981	1.83 m (6 ft 0 in)	Forum Filatélico Valladolid	(Spain)
F	12	Alonso Izaguirre	28 – 14 December 1976	2.00 m (6 ft 7 in)	Frayles de Guasave	(Mexico)
G	13	Enrique Zúñiga	29 – 7 July 1976	1.93 m (6 ft 4 in)	Lechugueros de Leon	(Mexico)
C	14	David Crouse	31 – 10 August 1974	2.11 m (6 ft 11 in)	Lobos de la UAC	(Mexico)
C	15	Adam Parada	23 – 21 October 1981	2.08 m (6 ft 10 in)	Correcaminos UAT Victoria	(Mexico)

Head coach

- (Mexico) Jorge Ramírez

Assistant coach(es)

- (Mexico) José Ramírez

Legend

- Club – describes last
  club before the tournament
- Age – describes age
  on August 24, 2005

=== Puerto Rico ===
Puerto Rico men's national basketball team roster
Players
Coaches

Pos.	No.	Name	Age – Date of birth	Height	Club	Ctr.
C	4	Peter John Ramos	20 – 23 May 1985	2.22 m (7 ft 3 in)	Washington Wizards	(United States)
F	5	David Cortez	23 – 23 December 1981	1.90 m (6 ft 3 in)	Capitanes de Arecibo	(Puerto Rico)
G	6	Bobby Joe Hatton	28 – 11 October 1976	1.88 m (6 ft 2 in)	Leones de Ponce	(Puerto Rico)
G	7	Filiberto Rivera	22 – 28 September 1982	1.87 m (6 ft 2 in)	University of Texas El Paso	(United States)
F	8	Rick Apodaca	25 – 1 July 1980	1.95 m (6 ft 5 in)	Atléticos de San Germán	(Puerto Rico)
G	9	Christian Dalmau	29 – 29 August 1975	1.92 m (6 ft 4 in)	Atléticos de San Germán	(Puerto Rico)
G	10	Elías Larry Ayuso	28 – 27 March 1977	1.92 m (6 ft 4 in)	Capitanes de Arecibo	(Puerto Rico)
F	11	Antonio Latimer	26 – 26 November 1978	2.00 m (6 ft 7 in)	Vaqueros de Bayamón	(Puerto Rico)
F	12	Gabriel Colón	20 – 20 December 1984	1.98 m (6 ft 6 in)	Leones de Ponce	(Puerto Rico)
F	13	Sharif Fajardo	29 – 9 June 1976	2.10 m (6 ft 11 in)	Capitanes de Arecibo	(Puerto Rico)
F	14	Ángel Figueroa	23 – 13 October 1981	1.91 m (6 ft 3 in)	Capitanes de Arecibo	(Puerto Rico)
C	15	Manuel Narvaez	23 – 18 December 1981	2.11 m (6 ft 11 in)	Leones de Ponce	(Puerto Rico)

Head coach

- (Puerto Rico) Julio Toro

Legend

- Club – describes last
  club before the tournament
- Age – describes age
  on August 24, 2005

=== Uruguay ===
Uruguay men's national basketball team roster
Players
Coaches

Pos.	No.	Name	Age – Date of birth	Height	Club	Ctr.
F	4	Diego Castrillón	30 – 8 January 1975	1.99 m (6 ft 6 in)	Club Atlético Capurro	(Uruguay)
F	5	Sebastián Izaguirre	19 – 4 December 1985	2.07 m (6 ft 9 in)	Club Social Larrañaga	(Uruguay)
F	6	Mauricio Aguiar	22 – 3 February 1983	1.99 m (6 ft 6 in)	Banco di Sardegna Sassari	(Italy)
F	7	Pablo Morales	27 – 31 May 1978	2.00 m (6 ft 7 in)	Salto Uruguay	(Uruguay)
G	8	Nicolás Mazzarino	29 – 21 October 1975	1.81 m (5 ft 11 in)	Vertical Vision Cantù	(Italy)
F	9	Claudio Charquero	28 – 22 July 1977	1.98 m (6 ft 6 in)	Paysandú BBC	(Uruguay)
G	10	Leandro García Morales	25 – 27 June 1980	1.88 m (6 ft 2 in)	Olimpia	(Uruguay)
G	11	Martín Osimani	24 – 22 May 1981	1.95 m (6 ft 5 in)	University of Duquesne	(United States)
C	12	Gastón Paez	25 – 22 September 1979	2.08 m (6 ft 10 in)	Independiente de Mercedes	(Uruguay)
G/F	13	Luis Silveira	34 – 16 January 1971	1.89 m (6 ft 2 in)	Salto Uruguay	(Uruguay)
F	14	Nicolás Borsellino	19 – 8 May 1986	2.02 m (6 ft 8 in)	Club Atlético Capurro	(Uruguay)
F/C	15	Esteban Batista	21 – 2 September 1983	2.08 m (6 ft 10 in)	Calpe Aguas	(Spain)

Head coach

- (Uruguay) Alberto Espasandin

Legend

- Club – describes last
  club before the tournament
- Age – describes age
  on August 24, 2005
