= 2005 FIBA Americas Championship =

Tournament details
- Host country: Dominican Republic
- City: Santo Domingo
- Dates: August 24 – September 4
- Teams: 10
- Venue: 1 (in 1 host city)

Final positions
- Champions: Brazil (3rd title)
- Runners-up: Argentina
- Third place: Venezuela
- Fourth place: United States

Tournament statistics
- MVP: (Brazil) Marcelo Machado
- Top scorer: (Brazil) Marcelo Machado (23.4 points per game)

The 2005 FIBA Americas Championship, later known as the FIBA AmeriCup (also known as The Tournament of the Americas), was hosted by the Dominican Republic, from August 24, to September 4, 2005. The games were played in Santo Domingo. This FIBA AmeriCup was to earn the four berths allocated to the Americas for the 2006 FIBA World Championship, in Japan. Argentina had already qualified, by winning the gold medal at the 2004 Olympics. Brazil won the tournament, the country's third AmeriCup championship.

== Venues ==
All games were played at the Palacio de los Deportes Virgilio Travieso Soto.

Santo Domingo
Palacio de los Deportes Virgilio Travieso Soto
Capacity: 8,337

== Qualification ==
Eight teams qualified during the qualification tournaments held in their respective zones in 2004; two teams (USA and Canada) qualified automatically since they are the only members of the North America zone.

- North America: Canada, United States
- Caribbean and Central America:Dominican Republic, Puerto Rico, Panama, Mexico
- South America: Argentina, Brazil, Uruguay, Venezuela

The tournament draw took place Monday, April 18, in Santo Domingo. The teams were split into 5 pots; those drawn first went to Group A, those drawn last went to Group B.

The draw split the tournament into two groups:

Group A

Brazil
Canada
Panama
United States
Venezuela

Group B

Argentina
Dominican Republic
Mexico
Puerto Rico
Uruguay

== Format ==
- The top four teams from each group advance to the quarterfinals.
- Results and standings among teams within the same group are carried over.
- The top four teams at the quarterfinals advance to the semifinals (1 vs. 4, 2 vs. 3).
- The winners in the knockout semifinals advance to the Final, where both are guaranteed of berths in the 2006 FIBA World Championship. The losers figure in a third-place playoff. The semifinal losers were also given berths in the 2006 World Championship. Also, should Argentina reach one of the first four places in the tournament, due to their obtaining the gold medal in the 2004 Olympic Tournament in Athens, the fifth best team in the quarterfinals stage was also qualified for the 2006 World Championship.

=== Tie-breaking criteria ===
Ties are broken via the following the criteria, with the first option used first, all the way down to the last option:

1. Head to head results
2. Goal average (not the goal difference) between the tied teams
3. Goal average of the tied teams for all teams in its group

== Preliminary round ==
Qualified for the quarterfinals

Times given below are in Atlantic Standard Time (UTC-4).

=== Group A ===
Team	Pld	W	L	PF	PA	PD	Pts	Tie
Brazil	4	3	1	393	342	+51	7	1–0
Venezuela	4	3	1	330	342	−12	7	0–1
United States	4	2	2	336	329	+7	6	
Panama	4	1	3	298	302	−4	5	1–0
Canada	4	1	3	318	360	−42	5	0–1

August 24
14:00

Boxscore

United States	94–72	Panama
Scoring by quarter: 30–24, 20–11, 24–17, 20–20
Pts: Scales 18; Rebs: Hamilton, McGhee 7 Asts: Edney 6		Pts: Cardenas 13; Rebs: A. García 9 Asts: Hicks 3

Palacio de los Deportes Virgilio Travieso Soto, Santo Domingo

August 24
16:30

Boxscore

Venezuela	88–111	Brazil
Scoring by quarter: 23–30, 7–28, 30–26, 28–27
Pts: Romero 24; Rebs: Romero, Torres 5 Asts: Guevara 7		Pts: Barbosa 28; Rebs: Barbosa 7 Asts: Barbosa 6

Palacio de los Deportes Virgilio Travieso Soto, Santo Domingo

August 25
13:30

Boxscore

Brazil	94–96	United States
Scoring by quarter: 21–25, 22–21, 25–18, 26–32
Pts: Barbosa 37; Rebs: Varejão 11; Asts: Machado 6		Pts: Bell 20; Rebs: McGhee 14; Asts: Greer, Slay 4

Palacio de los Deportes Virgilio Travieso Soto, Santo Domingo

August 25
16:00

Boxscore

Canada	91–100	Venezuela
Scoring by quarter: 27–24, 16–26, 20–28, 28–22
Pts: English 25; Rebs: Mendez 8 Asts: Anderson 4		Pts: Lugo, Torres 24; Rebs: Romero, Torres 8 Asts: Guevara 7

Palacio de los Deportes Virgilio Travieso Soto, Santo Domingo

August 26
14:00

Boxscore

Panama	77–83	Brazil
Scoring by quarter: 23–18, 11–19, 23–28, 20–18
Pts: Hicks 30; Rebs: Lloreda 11; Asts: Pinnock, Peralta 2		Pts: Machado 21; Rebs: Giovannoni, Becker 8 Asts: Machado 6

Palacio de los Deportes Virgilio Travieso Soto, Santo Domingo

August 26
16:30

Boxscore

United States	76–92	Canada
Scoring by quarter: 13–26, 15–23, 20–21, 28–22
Pts: Greer 21; Rebs: McGhee 7 Asts: Beasley, Slay 2		Pts: Brown 28; Rebs: Mendez 14; Asts: Brown, English, Nohr 3

Palacio de los Deportes Virgilio Travieso Soto, Santo Domingo

August 27
16:30

Boxscore

Venezuela	71–70	United States
Scoring by quarter: 13–26, 15–23, 20–21, 28–22
Pts: Romero 21; Rebs: Romero 12; Asts: Guevara 5		Pts: Bell 21; Rebs: Hamilton, Lang 8 Asts: Edney, Hamilton 3

Palacio de los Deportes Virgilio Travieso Soto, Santo Domingo

August 27
19:00

Boxscore

Panama	79–54	Canada
Scoring by quarter: 16–15, 20–10, 24–13, 19–16
Pts: Hicks, Pinnock 14; Rebs: García 22; Asts: Peralta 4		Pts: English 16; Rebs: Brown, English, Mendez 7 Asts: English 4

Palacio de los Deportes Virgilio Travieso Soto, Santo Domingo

August 28
13:30

Boxscore

Brazil	105–81	Canada
Scoring by quarter: 30–26, 23–13, 18–24, 34–18
Pts: Machado 42; Rebs: Machado 11; Asts: Machado 7		Pts: Brown 25; Rebs: English 9 Asts: English 5

Palacio de los Deportes Virgilio Travieso Soto, Santo Domingo

August 28
16:00

Boxscore

Panama	70–71	Venezuela
Scoring by quarter: 18–23, 12–15, 18–20, 22–13
Pts: Lloreda, Pinnock 16; Rebs: Lloreda 11; Asts: Lloreda 3		Pts: Guevara 23; Rebs: Torres 11; Asts: Guevara 4

Palacio de los Deportes Virgilio Travieso Soto, Santo Domingo

=== Group B ===
Team	Pld	W	L	PF	PA	PD	Pts	Tie
Argentina	4	3	1	348	307	+41	7	1–0
Dominican Republic	4	3	1	325	333	−8	7	0–1
Puerto Rico	4	2	2	354	339	+15	6	
Uruguay	4	1	3	312	313	−1	5	1–0
Mexico	4	1	3	324	371	−47	5	0–1

August 24
19:00

Boxscore

Argentina	82–96	Mexico
Scoring by quarter: 28–18, 17–22, 19–26, 18–30
Pts: Jasen 21; Rebs: Farabello, Fernández, Kammerichs, Quinteros 4 Asts: Farabello 8		Pts: Beck 28; Rebs: Ávila 8 Asts: Llamas, Quintero 4

Palacio de los Deportes Virgilio Travieso Soto, Santo Domingo

August 24
21:30

Boxscore

Uruguay	69–72	Dominican Republic
Scoring by quarter: 22–14, 13–16, 27–26, 7–16
Pts: Mazzarino 26; Rebs: Batista 17; Asts: Mazzarino 4		Pts: García, Martínez 15; Rebs: Martínez 13; Asts: Flores, García 2

Palacio de los Deportes Virgilio Travieso Soto, Santo Domingo

August 25
18:30

Boxscore

Mexico	60–91	Uruguay
Scoring by quarter: 20–15, 13–23, 12–34, 15–19
Pts: Ávila, Pedroza 12; Rebs: Pedroza 7 Asts: Zúñiga 4		Pts: Batista 23; Rebs: Batista 12; Asts: Mazzarino 6

Palacio de los Deportes Virgilio Travieso Soto, Santo Domingo

August 25
21:00

Boxscore

Puerto Rico	79–96	Argentina
Scoring by quarter: 28–22, 16–17, 19–32, 16–25
Pts: Apodaca 23; Rebs: Narvaez 9 Asts: Dalmau 5		Pts: Quinteros 30; Rebs: Quinteros 7 Asts: Farabello 7

Palacio de los Deportes Virgilio Travieso Soto, Santo Domingo

August 26
19:00

Boxscore

Uruguay	80–95	Puerto Rico
Scoring by quarter: 20–19, 19–33, 21–20, 20–23
Pts: Mazzarino 23; Rebs: Batista 19; Asts: Batista, Mazzarino 4		Pts: Ayuso 19; Rebs: Ramos 21; Asts: Ayuso, Dalmau, Hatton 4

Palacio de los Deportes Virgilio Travieso Soto, Santo Domingo

August 26
21:30

Boxscore

Dominican Republic	104–94	Mexico
Scoring by quarter: 28–19, 17–24, 32–26, 27–25
Pts: García 24; Rebs: Martínez 14; Asts: Flores 6		Pts: Beck 29; Rebs: Ávila, Parada, Quintero 7 Asts: Zúñiga 4

Palacio de los Deportes Virgilio Travieso Soto, Santo Domingo

August 27
13:00

Boxscore

Argentina	86–72	Uruguay
Scoring by quarter: 19–19, 22–19, 21–20, 24–14
Pts: Kammerichs 16; Rebs: Quinteros 7 Asts: Farabello 7		Pts: Batista 19; Rebs: Batista 13; Asts: Mazzarino 3

Palacio de los Deportes Virgilio Travieso Soto, Santo Domingo

August 27
21:30

Boxscore

Puerto Rico	86–89	Dominican Republic
Scoring by quarter: 22–15, 27–18, 23–25, 14–31
Pts: Dalmau 27; Rebs: Ramos 9 Asts: Apodaca, Latimer 6		Pts: Martínez 23; Rebs: Martínez 21; Asts: Flores 4

Palacio de los Deportes Virgilio Travieso Soto, Santo Domingo

August 28
18:30

Boxscore

Mexico	74–94	Puerto Rico
Scoring by quarter: 13–19, 14–23, 27–19, 20–33
Pts: Quintero 28; Rebs: Llamas 10; Asts: González, Llamas, Quintero 3		Pts: Ayuso 27; Rebs: Ramos 14; Asts: Hatton 6

Palacio de los Deportes Virgilio Travieso Soto, Santo Domingo

August 28
21:00

Boxscore

Dominican Republic	60–84	Argentina
Scoring by quarter: 14–12, 11–29, 27–19, 8–24
Pts: García 22; Rebs: Martínez 10; Asts: Arias 4		Pts: L. Gutiérrez 19; Rebs: Jasen 12; Asts: Porta 7

Palacio de los Deportes Virgilio Travieso Soto, Santo Domingo

== Quarterfinal group ==
Qualified for the semifinals
Fifth place

The top four teams in both Group A and Group B advanced to the quarterfinal group. Then each team played the four from the other group once to complete a full round robin. Records from the preliminary groups carried over, but only against teams that also advanced. The top four teams advanced to the semifinals. The fifth-place team (Panama) did not continue competing for the Americas Championship, but qualified for the 2006 FIBA World Championship.

Team	Pld	W	L	PF	PA	PD	Pts	Tie
Argentina	7	6	1	665	583	+82	13	
Brazil	7	4	3	723	661	+62	11	2−1 (1.103)
United States	7	4	3	688	664	+24	11	2−1 (1.097)
Venezuela	7	4	3	636	679	−43	11	2−1 (1.000)
Panama	7	4	3	627	590	+37	11	0-3
Dominican Republic	7	3	4	648	675	−27	10	1−0
Puerto Rico	7	3	4	677	679	−2	10	0−1
Uruguay	7	0	7	628	672	−44	7	

August 30

Boxscore

Argentina	84–89	Panama
Pts: Kammericks 18; Rebs: Jasen 7 Asts: Lo Grippo 5		Pts: Peralta 24; Rebs: García 16; Asts: Peralta 6

Palacio de los Deportes Virgilio Travieso Soto, Santo Domingo

August 30

Boxscore

Brazil	89–69	Uruguay
Pts: Barbosa 27; Rebs: Splitter 12; Asts: Machado 5		Pts: Batista 20; Rebs: Batista 17; Asts: Mazzarino, Osimani 5

Palacio de los Deportes Virgilio Travieso Soto, Santo Domingo

August 30

Boxscore

Venezuela	82–73	Puerto Rico
Pts: Romero 27; Rebs: Torres 12; Asts: Bayona, Lugo, Romero 2		Pts: Ayuso 22; Rebs: Ramos 13; Asts: Dalmau 3

Palacio de los Deportes Virgilio Travieso Soto, Santo Domingo

August 30

Boxscore

Dominican Republic	86–111	United States
Pts: García 26; Rebs: López, Martínez 6 Asts: López, Martínez 3		Pts: Bell 20; Rebs: Hamilton 6 Asts: Bell 5

Palacio de los Deportes Virgilio Travieso Soto, Santo Domingo

August 31

Boxscore

Uruguay	99–101	Venezuela
Pts: Batista 25; Rebs: Batista 18; Asts: García Morales 7		Pts: Torres 26; Rebs: Lugo 7 Asts: Torres 5

Palacio de los Deportes Virgilio Travieso Soto, Santo Domingo

August 31

Boxscore

Puerto Rico	107–101	Brazil
Pts: Ayuso 29; Rebs: Narvaez 15; Asts: Ayuso 4		Pts: Machado 34; Rebs: Splitter 18; Asts: Machado 10

Palacio de los Deportes Virgilio Travieso Soto, Santo Domingo

August 31

Boxscore

United States	67–84	Argentina
Pts: Edney, Lang 11; Rebs: Hamilton 11; Asts: Edney, Greer 3		Pts: Quinteros 21; Rebs: González 7 Asts: Farabello 6

Palacio de los Deportes Virgilio Travieso Soto, Santo Domingo

August 31

Boxscore

Panama	88–78	Dominican Republic
Pts: Lloreda 18; Rebs: García 13; Asts: Hicks 5		Pts: Flores, Martínez 18; Rebs: Martínez 12; Asts: Ramírez 5

Palacio de los Deportes Virgilio Travieso Soto, Santo Domingo

September 1

Boxscore

Argentina	78–60	Venezuela
Pts: González, Mázzaro 16; Rebs: Kammerichs 7 Asts: Farabello 6		Pts: Romero 15; Rebs: Aguilera 10; Asts: Marriaga, Mijares 2

Palacio de los Deportes Virgilio Travieso Soto, Santo Domingo

September 1

Boxscore

Uruguay	77–91	United States
Pts: Mazzarino 32; Rebs: Batista 11; Asts: Mazzarino 4		Pts: Bell 20; Rebs: Lang 11; Asts: Scales 5

Palacio de los Deportes Virgilio Travieso Soto, Santo Domingo

September 1

Boxscore

Puerto Rico	55–74	Panama
Pts: Dalmau 15; Rebs: Ramos 8 Asts: Dalmau, Ramos 5		Pts: Hicks 31; Rebs: García 16; Asts: García, Muñoz 3

Palacio de los Deportes Virgilio Travieso Soto, Santo Domingo

September 1

Boxscore

Dominican Republic	72–80	Brazil
Pts: Flores 17; Rebs: Asselin, Martínez 12; Asts: Arias 3		Pts: Machado 23; Rebs: Becker 11; Asts: Barbosa 4

Palacio de los Deportes Virgilio Travieso Soto, Santo Domingo

September 2

Boxscore

Panama	78–71	Uruguay
Pts: Hicks 17; Rebs: García 13; Asts: García, Lloreda 4		Pts: Mazzarino 25; Rebs: Batista 18; Asts: García Morales 3

Palacio de los Deportes Virgilio Travieso Soto, Santo Domingo

September 2

Boxscore

Brazil	60–71	Argentina
Pts: Garcia 12; Rebs: Becker 13; Asts: Huertas 3		Pts: González, Jasen 12; Rebs: González 7 Asts: Lo Grippo, Porta 3

Palacio de los Deportes Virgilio Travieso Soto, Santo Domingo

September 2

Boxscore

United States	83–88	Puerto Rico
Pts: Beasley 18; Rebs: Beasley 10; Asts: Greer 5		Pts: Apodaca 34; Rebs: Hatton 10; Asts: Hatton 6

Palacio de los Deportes Virgilio Travieso Soto, Santo Domingo

September 2

Boxscore

Venezuela	63–87	Dominican Republic
Pts: Romero 22; Rebs: Romero 10; Asts: Jones, Romero 3		Pts: Martínez 21; Rebs: Flores 9 Asts: García 6

Palacio de los Deportes Virgilio Travieso Soto, Santo Domingo

== Knockout stage ==
Semi-finals
September 3 – 19:00
United States	75
Brazil	93
September 3 – 21:30
Argentina	104
Venezuela	93

Final
September 4 – 21:00
Brazil	100
Argentina	88
Third place
September 4 – 18:00
United States	83
Venezuela	93

=== Semifinals ===
September 3
19:00

Boxscore

United States	75–93	Brazil
Scoring by quarter: 17–25, 24–26, 19–23, 15–19
Pts: Lang 14; Rebs: Lang 9 Asts: Slay 6		Pts: Machado 19; Rebs: Splitter 17; Asts: Splitter 5

Palacio de los Deportes Virgilio Travieso Soto, Santo Domingo
Attendance: 3,000

September 3
21:30

Boxscore

Argentina	104–93	Venezuela
Scoring by quarter: 33–30, 20–20, 23–19, 28–24
Pts: Quinteros 15; Rebs: Kammerichs 7 Asts: Farabello 6		Pts: Torres 26; Rebs: Romero 8 Asts: Guevara, Mijares, Romero 3

Palacio de los Deportes Virgilio Travieso Soto, Santo Domingo

=== Third place game ===
September 4
18:00

Boxscore

United States	83–93	Venezuela
Scoring by quarter: 18–20, 14–17, 24–27, 27–29
Pts: Lang 30; Rebs: Lang 14; Asts: Bell 5		Pts: Torres 23; Rebs: Romero 9 Asts: Mijares 5

Palacio de los Deportes Virgilio Travieso Soto, Santo Domingo

=== Final ===
September 4
21:00

Boxscore

Brazil	100–88	Argentina
Scoring by quarter: 21–32, 28–11, 18–23, 33–22
Pts: Barbosa 29; Rebs: Garcia 9 Asts: Machado 6		Pts: González 23; Rebs: González 8 Asts: Porta 4

Palacio de los Deportes Virgilio Travieso Soto, Santo Domingo

== Awards ==
2005 Tournament of the Americas winners

Brazil
Third title

== Statistical leaders ==
=== Individual Tournament Highs ===
Points

Pos.	Name	PPG
1	(Brazil) Marcelinho Machado	23.4
2	(Brazil) Leandro Barbosa	21.2
3	(Uruguay) Nicolás Mazzarino	21.0
4	(Puerto Rico) Larry Ayuso	18.9
4	(Dominican Republic) Francisco García	18.9
6	(Puerto Rico) Rick Apodaca	18.4
7	(Uruguay) Esteban Batista	18.0
8	(Venezuela) Óscar Torres	17.7
9	(Dominican Republic) Luis Flores	17.0
10	(Venezuela) Héctor Romero	16.7

Rebounds

Pos.	Name	RPG
1	(Uruguay) Esteban Batista	15.6
2	(Panama) Antonio García	12.9
3	(Dominican Republic) Jack Michael Martínez	11.9
4	(Puerto Rico) Peter John Ramos	9.8
5	(Brazil) Tiago Splitter	9.6
6	(Panama) Jaime Lloreda	9.4
7	(Venezuela) Héctor Romero	7.7
8	(Venezuela) Óscar Torres	7.6
9	(United States) Kris Lang	7.4
10	(United States) Aaron McGhee	6.9

Assists

Pos.	Name	APG
1	(Argentina) Daniel Farabello	5.9
2	(Brazil) Marcelinho Machado	5.6
3	(Brazil) Leandro Barbosa	4.2
4	(Uruguay) Nicolás Mazzarino	4.1
5	(Venezuela) Diego Guevara	3.4
6	(Puerto Rico) Christian Dalmau	3.1
7	(Puerto Rico) Bobby Joe Hatton	3.0
8	(Dominican Republic) Luis Flores	2.9
9	(United States) Tyus Edney	2.7
10	(United States) Charlie Bell	2.5
10	(United States) Lynn Greer	2.5

Steals

Pos.	Name	SPG
1	(Brazil) Leandro Barbosa	2.2
1	(Argentina) Paolo Quinteros	1.9
3	(Dominican Republic) Francisco García	1.7
3	(Panama) Danilo Pinnock	1.7
5	(Argentina) Daniel Farabello	1.6
5	(Brazil) Marcelinho Machado	1.6
7	(Puerto Rico) Rick Apodaca	1.5
7	(Uruguay) Esteban Batista	1.5
9	(Panama) Jaime Lloreda	1.4
10	(United States) Charlie Bell	1.3

Blocks

Pos.	Name	BPG
1	(Venezuela) Richard Lugo	2.8
2	(Puerto Rico) Peter John Ramos	2.0
3	(Brazil) Tiago Splitter	1.6
3	(Dominican Republic) Francisco García	1.6
5	(United States) Kris Lang	1.4
5	(Dominican Republic) Josh Asselin	1.4
7	(Dominican Republic) Jack Michael Martínez	1.1
8	(Uruguay) Esteban Batista	1.0
8	(Panama) Jaime Lloreda	1.0
10	(Panama) Antonio García	0.9

Minutes

Pos.	Name	MPG
1	(Brazil) Marcelinho Machado	36.7
2	(Uruguay) Nicolás Mazzarino	36.0
3	(Brazil) Leandro Barbosa	35.4
4	(Uruguay) Esteban Batista	34.3
5	(Puerto Rico) Rick Apodaca	33.8
6	(Puerto Rico) Larry Ayuso	32.9
7	(Venezuela) Héctor Romero	32.3
7	(Dominican Republic) Francisco García	32.3
9	(Brazil) Tiago Splitter	32.0
10	(Dominican Republic) Luis Flores	31.5

=== Individual Game Highs ===
Department	Name	Total	Opponent
Points	(Brazil) Marcelinho Machado	42	Canada
Rebounds	(Panama) Antonio García	22	Canada
Assists	(Brazil) Marcelinho Machado	10	Puerto Rico
Steals	(Argentina) Paolo Quinteros	5	Puerto Rico
Blocks	(Puerto Rico) Peter John Ramos	8	Uruguay
Turnovers	(Uruguay) Mauricio Aguiar	8	Dominican Republic

=== Team Tournament Highs ===
Offensive PPG

Pos.	Name	PPG
1	Panama	91.6
2	Venezuela	85.7
3	Canada	84.6
4	Uruguay	84.6
5	Brazil	82.2

Defensive PPG

Pos.	Name	PPG
1	Panama	84.3
2	Argentina	86.2
3	Venezuela	88.8
4	Canada	90.0
5	Mexico	92.8

Rebounds

Pos.	Name	RPG
1	Panama	40.4
2	Dominican Republic	39.9
2	Brazil	37.9
4	United States	37.6
5	Puerto Rico	37.1

Assists

Pos.	Name	APG
1	Argentina	16.8
2	Brazil	16.6
3	United States	15.3
4	Mexico	14.8
5	Venezuela	14.6

Steals

Pos.	Name	SPG
1	Argentina	8.8
2	Brazil	8.5
3	Panama	8.5
4	Uruguay	7.8
5	Venezuela	6.9

Blocks

Pos.	Name	BPG
1	Dominican Republic	5.6
2	Venezuela	3.8
3	Panama	3.8
4	Mexico	3.5
5	Argentina	3.3

=== Team Game highs ===
Department	Name	Total	Opponent
Points	Brazil; United States	111	Venezuela; Dominican Republic
Rebounds	Dominican Republic	52	Puerto Rico
Assists	Brazil	26	Canada
Steals	Brazil	17	Venezuela
Blocks	Venezuela	10	United States
Field goal percentage	Venezuela	66.7%	Uruguay
3-point field goal percentage	United States	58.8%	Uruguay
Free throw percentage	Canada	94.1%	Venezuela
Turnovers	Brazil; United States	25	Argentina; Brazil

== Final standings ==
Qualified for 2006 FIBA World Championship
Qualified for the 2006 FIBA World Championship as wild cards

Rank	Team	Record
1st place, gold medalist(s)	Brazil	7–3
2nd place, silver medalist(s)	Argentina	7–3
3rd place, bronze medalist(s)	Venezuela	6–4
4	United States	4–6
5	Panama	5–3
6	Dominican Republic	4–4
7	Puerto Rico	4–4
8	Uruguay	1–7
9	Canada	1–3
10	Mexico	1–3

1st	2nd	3rd	4th
Brazil Marcelinho Machado; Nezinho dos Santos; Murilo Becker; Marcelinho Huertas; Leandro Barbosa; Jefferson Da Silva; Alex Garcia; Anderson Varejão; Guilherme Giovannoni; Rafael Hettsheimeir; Caio Torres; Tiago Splitter	Argentina Antonio Porta; Julio Mázzaro; Román González; Diego Lo Grippo; Daniel Farabello; Gabriel Fernández; Leonardo Gutiérrez; Martín Leiva; Juan Pedro Gutiérrez; Paolo Quinteros; Hernán Jasen; Federico Kammerichs	Venezuela Víctor Díaz; Luis Julio; Ernesto Mijares; Richard Lugo; Tomás Aguilera; Óscar Torres; Askia Jones; Miguel Ángel Marriaga; Héctor Romero; Diego Guevara; Heberth Bayona; Carlos Morris	United States Tyus Edney; Marque Perry; Lynn Greer; Charlie Bell; Alex Scales; Tang Hamilton; Ron Slay; Adam Chubb; Noel Felix; Aaron McGhee; Jerome Beasley; Kris Lang
