= 2007 FIBA Americas Championship squads =

The following is the list of squads for each of the 10 teams competing in the 2007 FIBA Americas Championship, held in Las Vegas, Nevada between August 22 and September 2, 2007. Each team selected a squad of 12 players for the tournament.

== Group A ==
=== Argentina ===
Head coach: (Argentina) Sergio Hernández

#	Pos	Name	Date of Birth	Height	Club
4	F	Luis Scola	April 30, 1980 (age 27)	6 ft 9 in (2.06 m)	(United States) Houston Rockets
5	G	Pablo Prigioni	May 17, 1977 (age 30)	6 ft 1 in (1.85 m)	(Spain) TAU Cerámica
6	C	Román González	January 28, 1978 (age 29)	6 ft 10 in (2.08 m)	(Argentina) Peñarol de Mar del Plata
7	F	Diego Lo Grippo	January 22, 1978 (age 29)	6 ft 7 in (2.01 m)	(Spain) CB Atapuerca
8	C	Juan Pedro Gutiérrez	October 10, 1983 (age 23)	6 ft 9 in (2.06 m)	(Spain) CB Granada
9	G	Antonio Porta	October 28, 1983 (age 23)	6 ft 9 in (2.06 m)	(Russia) Spartak St. Petersburg
10	G	Carlos Delfino	August 29, 1982 (age 24)	6 ft 5 in (1.96 m)	(Canada) Toronto Raptors
11	C	Martín Leiva	April 23, 1980 (age 27)	6 ft 10 in (2.08 m)	(Spain) CB Atapuerca
12	F	Leonardo Gutiérrez	May 16, 1978 (age 29)	6 ft 7 in (2.01 m)	(Argentina) Boca Juniors
13	G	Paolo Quinteros	January 15, 1979 (age 26)	6 ft 2 in (1.88 m)	(Spain) CAI Zaragoza
14	F	Matías Sandes	June 14, 1984 (age 23)	6 ft 7 in (2.01 m)	(Spain) TAU Cerámica
15	F	Federico Kammerichs	June 21, 1980 (age 27)	6 ft 8 in (2.03 m)	(Spain) CB Murcia

=== Mexico ===
Head coach: (United States) Nolan Richardson

#	Pos	Name	Date of Birth	Height	Club
4	C	Adam Parada	October 21, 1981 (age 25)	7 ft 0 in (2.13 m)	(Jordan) Fastlink
5	G	Pedro David Meza	October 15, 1978 (age 26)	6 ft 1 in (1.85 m)	(Mexico) Caballeros de Culiacán
6	G	Anthony Pedroza	March 7, 1979 (age 28)	6 ft 3 in (1.91 m)	(Venezuela) Gaiteros del Zulia
7	C	Horacio Llamas	July 17, 1973 (age 34)	6 ft 11 in (2.11 m)	(Mexico) Dorados de Playa del Carmen
8	F/C	Arim Solares	April 24, 1983 (age 24)	6 ft 6 in (1.98 m)	(Mexico) Santos Reales de San Luis
9	G	Romel Beck	May 29, 1982 (age 25)	6 ft 7 in (2.01 m)	(Venezuela) Gatos de Monagas
10	F	Víctor Mariscal	May 24, 1972 (age 35)	6 ft 7 in (2.01 m)	(Mexico) Halcones UV Xalapa
11	G	Omar Quintero	September 26, 1981 (age 26)	6 ft 0 in (1.83 m)	(Venezuela) Marinos de Anzoategui
12	F	Héctor Hernández	June 15, 1985 (age 22)	6 ft 9 in (2.06 m)	(United States) Fresno State University
13	G	Enrique Zúñiga	July 7, 1976 (age 31)	6 ft 4 in (1.93 m)	(Mexico) Frayles de Guasave
14	F/C	Gustavo Ayón	April 1, 1985 (age 22)	6 ft 10 in (2.08 m)	(Mexico) Vaqueros de Agua Prieta
15	C	Victor Avila	March 23, 1977 (age 30)	6 ft 10 in (2.08 m)	(Mexico) Caballeros de Culiacán

=== Panama ===
Head coach: (Panama) Vicente Duncan

#	Pos	Name	Date of Birth	Height	Club
4	G	Joel Muñoz	June 24, 1980 (age 27)	5 ft 10 in (1.78 m)	(Panama) Magnates de Calidonia
5	G	Jamar Green	February 18, 1979 (age 28)	6 ft 0 in (1.83 m)	(Montenegro) KK Mogren
6	F	J. R. Pinnock	December 11, 1983 (age 23)	6 ft 6 in (1.98 m)	(United States) Arkansas Rimrockers
7	G	Maximiliano Gómez	December 18, 1975 (age 31)	6 ft 4 in (1.93 m)	(Panama) Toros de Chorrillo
8	F/C	Jamaal Levy	January 8, 1983 (age 24)	6 ft 9 in (2.06 m)	(Argentina) Peñarol de Mar del Plata
9	G	Jorsua Chambers	June 11, 1981 (age 26)	6 ft 4 in (1.93 m)	(Panama) Toros de Chorrillo
10	F	Reyjavick Garcia	November 5, 1981 (age 25)	6 ft 8 in (2.03 m)	(Panama) Navieros de Colón
11	F/G	Gary Forbes	February 25, 1985 (age 22)	6 ft 7 in (2.01 m)	(United States) University of Massachusetts
12	F	Amir Alvarado	July 19, 1984 (age 23)	6 ft 6 in (1.98 m)	Liceo de Costa Rica
13	F/C	Antonio García	May 11, 1976 (age 31)	6 ft 8 in (2.03 m)	(Argentina) Estudiantes de Olavarría
14	F/C	Jaime Lloreda	October 11, 1980 (age 26)	6 ft 8 in (2.03 m)	(Russia) Lokomotiv Rostov
15	F	Desmond Smith	November 24, 1986 (age 20)	6 ft 6 in (1.98 m)	(Panama) Magnates de Calidonia

=== Puerto Rico ===
Head coach: (Puerto Rico) Manolo Cintron

#	Pos	Name	Date of Birth	Height	Club
4	C	Peter John Ramos	May 23, 1985 (age 22)	7 ft 3 in (2.21 m)	(Spain) Baloncesto Fuenlabrada
5	G	José Juan Barea	June 26, 1984 (age 23)	6 ft 0 in (1.83 m)	(United States) Dallas Mavericks
6	G	Filiberto Rivera	September 28, 1982 (age 24)	6 ft 2 in (1.88 m)	(Italy) Eldo Basket Napoli
7	G	Carlos Arroyo	July 30, 1979 (age 28)	6 ft 2 in (1.88 m)	(United States) Orlando Magic
8	F	Rick Apodaca	July 1, 1980 (age 27)	6 ft 4 in (1.93 m)	(Turkey) Beşiktaş Cola Turka
9	F	Alex Falcón	November 20, 1973 (age 34)	6 ft 7 in (2.01 m)	(Puerto Rico) Cangrejeros de Santurce
10	G	Larry Ayuso	March 27, 1977 (age 30)	6 ft 7 in (2.01 m)	(Croatia) KK Cibona
11	F	Ricardo Sanchez	July 6, 1987 (age 20)	6 ft 11 in (2.11 m)	(Puerto Rico) Grises de Humacao
12	F	Angelo Reyes	September 18, 1981 (age 25)	6 ft 7 in (2.01 m)	(Puerto Rico) Gigantes de Carolina
13	C	Héctor Valenzuela	January 14, 1982 (age 25)	6 ft 8 in (2.03 m)	(Puerto Rico) Mets de Guaynabo
14	F	Carmelo Lee	June 7, 1977 (age 30)	6 ft 7 in (2.01 m)	(Puerto Rico) Mets de Guaynabo
15	F	Ángel Figueroa	October 13, 1981 (age 25)	6 ft 3 in (1.91 m)	(Puerto Rico) Capitanes de Arecibo

=== Uruguay ===
Head coach: (Uruguay) Alberto Espasandín

#	Pos	Name	Date of Birth	Height	Club
4	G	Fernando Martínez	December 9, 1979 (age 27)	5 ft 9 in (1.75 m)	(Uruguay) Malvín
5	G	Emilio Taboada	May 11, 1982 (age 25)	6 ft 6 in (1.98 m)	(Uruguay) Malvín
6	F	Mauricio Aguiar	February 3, 1983 (age 24)	6 ft 6 in (1.98 m)	(Italy) Basket Livorno
7	F	Omar Galeano	August 3, 1981 (age 26)	6 ft 6 in (1.98 m)	(Uruguay) Biguá
8	G	Nicolás Mazzarino	October 21, 1975 (age 31)	6 ft 0 in (1.83 m)	(Italy) Tisettanta Cantù
9	C	Claudio Charquero	July 22, 1977 (age 30)	6 ft 9 in (2.06 m)	(Spain) CB Illescas
10	G	Leandro García Morales	June 27, 1980 (age 27)	6 ft 2 in (1.88 m)	(Uruguay) Biguá
11	F	Martín Osimani	May 22, 1981 (age 26)	6 ft 4 in (1.93 m)	(Uruguay) Biguá
12	C	Gastón Páez	September 22, 1979 (age 27)	6 ft 9 in (2.06 m)	(Uruguay) Defensor Sporting
13	G	Luis Silveira	January 16, 1971 (age 36)	6 ft 3 in (1.91 m)	(Uruguay) Atenas
14	F	Sebastián Izaguirre	April 12, 1985 (age 22)	6 ft 9 in (2.06 m)	(Uruguay) Paysandú
15	C	Esteban Batista	September 2, 1983 (age 24)	6 ft 10 in (2.08 m)	(Israel) Maccabi Tel Aviv

== Group B ==
=== Brazil ===
Head coach: (Brazil) Lula Ferreira

#	Pos	Name	Date of Birth	Height	Club
4	F	Marcelo Machado	April 12, 1975 (age 32)	6 ft 7 in (2.01 m)	(Lithuania) BC Žalgiris
5	G	Nezinho Dos Santos	January 21, 1981 (age 26)	6 ft 1 in (1.85 m)	(Brazil) Universo/Brasilia
6	F/C	Murilo Becker	July 14, 1983 (age 24)	6 ft 10 in (2.08 m)	(Israel) Maccabi Tel Aviv
7	G	Marcelinho Huertas	May 25, 1983 (age 24)	6 ft 3 in (1.91 m)	(Spain) Joventut Badalona
8	G	Alex Garcia	March 4, 1980 (age 27)	6 ft 3 in (1.91 m)	(Brazil) Universo/Brasilia
9	G	Valter Apolinario Da Silva	January 31, 1977 (age 30)	6 ft 2 in (1.88 m)	(Brazil) Unitri Uberlândia
10	G	Leandro Barbosa	November 28, 1982 (age 24)	6 ft 3 in (1.91 m)	(United States) Phoenix Suns
11	F	João Paulo Batista	October 29, 1981 (age 25)	6 ft 11 in (2.11 m)	(Lithuania) Lietuvos Rytas
12	F	Guilherme Giovannoni	June 2, 1980 (age 27)	6 ft 8 in (2.03 m)	(Italy) VidiVici Bologna
13	C	Nenê	September 13, 1982 (age 24)	6 ft 11 in (2.11 m)	(United States) Denver Nuggets
14	F	Marcus Vinicius	May 31, 1984 (age 23)	6 ft 8 in (2.03 m)	(United States) New Orleans Hornets
15	F/C	Tiago Splitter	January 1, 1985 (age 22)	6 ft 11 in (2.11 m)	(Spain) TAU Cerámica

=== Canada ===
Head coach: (Canada) Leo Rautins

#	Pos	Name	Date of Birth	Height	Club
4	G	Jermaine Anderson	February 8, 1983 (age 24)	6 ft 2 in (1.88 m)	(Poland) Polpak Świecie
5	G	Denham Brown	January 6, 1983 (age 24)	6 ft 5 in (1.96 m)	(Italy) Tisettanta Cantù
6	C	Samuel Dalembert	May 10, 1980 (age 27)	6 ft 10 in (2.08 m)	(United States) Philadelphia 76ers
7	C	Vladimir Kuljanin	April 2, 1985 (age 22)	6 ft 10 in (2.08 m)	(United States) University of North Carolina-Wilmington
8	G	Carl English	February 2, 1981 (age 26)	6 ft 5 in (1.96 m)	(Spain) Gran Canaria Grupo Dunas
9	F	Olu Famutimi	February 21, 1984 (age 23)	6 ft 6 in (1.98 m)	(United States) Arkansas RimRockers
10	G	Andy Rautins	November 2, 1986 (age 20)	6 ft 5 in (1.96 m)	(United States) Syracuse University
11	G	David Thomas	December 4, 1976 (age 31)	6 ft 8 in (2.03 m)	(Australia) Melbourne Tigers
12	C	Jesse Young	April 29, 1980 (age 27)	6 ft 10 in (2.08 m)	(Spain) Joventut Badalona
13	F	Juan Mendez	September 23, 1981 (age 25)	6 ft 8 in (2.03 m)	(Israel) Ironi Nahariya
14	F	Levon Kendall	July 4, 1984 (age 23)	6 ft 10 in (2.08 m)	(Greece) Panionios
15	F	Ryan Bell	April 17, 1984 (age 23)	6 ft 5 in (1.96 m)	(Canada) Carleton University

=== United States ===
Head coach: (United States) Mike Krzyzewski

#	Pos	Name	Date of Birth	Height	Club
4	G	Chauncey Billups	September 25, 1976 (age 30)	6 ft 3 in (1.91 m)	(United States) Detroit Pistons
5	G	Jason Kidd	March 23, 1973 (age 34)	6 ft 4 in (1.93 m)	(United States) New Jersey Nets
6	F	LeBron James	December 30, 1984 (age 22)	6 ft 8 in (2.03 m)	(United States) Cleveland Cavaliers
7	G	Deron Williams	June 26, 1984 (age 23)	6 ft 3 in (1.91 m)	(United States) Utah Jazz
8	G	Michael Redd	August 24, 1979 (age 26)	6 ft 6 in (1.98 m)	(United States) Milwaukee Bucks
9	F	Tayshaun Prince	February 28, 1980 (age 27)	6 ft 9 in (2.06 m)	(United States) Detroit Pistons
10	G	Kobe Bryant	August 23, 1978 (age 28)	6 ft 6 in (1.98 m)	(United States) Los Angeles Lakers
11	C	Dwight Howard	August 12, 1985 (age 21)	6 ft 11 in (2.11 m)	(United States) Orlando Magic
12	C	Amar'e Stoudemire	November 16, 1982 (age 23)	6 ft 10 in (2.08 m)	(United States) Phoenix Suns
13	G	Mike Miller	February 19, 1980 (age 27)	6 ft 8 in (2.03 m)	(United States) Memphis Grizzlies
14	C	Tyson Chandler	October 2, 1982 (age 24)	7 ft 1 in (2.16 m)	(United States) New Orleans Hornets
15	F	Carmelo Anthony	May 29, 1984 (age 23)	6 ft 9 in (2.06 m)	(United States) Denver Nuggets

=== Venezuela ===
Head coach: (Venezuela) Nestor Salazar

#	Pos	Name	Date of Birth	Height	Club
4	F/C	Miguel Marriaga	June 6, 1984 (age 23)	6 ft 10 in (2.08 m)	(Venezuela) Gaiteros del Zulia
5	F	Axiers Sucre	July 27, 1978 (age 29)	6 ft 6 in (1.98 m)	(Venezuela) Marinos de Anzoátegui
6	G	Carlos Cedeno	October 23, 1985 (age 21)	6 ft 4 in (1.93 m)	(Venezuela) Guaiqueríes de Margarita
7	F/C	Luis Bethelmy	October 14, 1986 (age 20)	6 ft 8 in (2.03 m)	(Venezuela) Cocodrilos de Caracas
8	F	Hernán Salcedo	April 22, 1980 (age 27)	6 ft 6 in (1.98 m)	(Venezuela) Guaros de Lara
9	F	Jesus Urbina	July 9, 1984 (age 23)	6 ft 8 in (2.03 m)	(United States) George Mason University
10	F	Kevin Palacios	September 29, 1984 (age 22)	6 ft 8 in (2.03 m)	(Venezuela) Duros de Lara
11	F/G	José Vargas	January 23, 1982 (age 25)	6 ft 5 in (1.96 m)	(Venezuela) Trotamundos de Carabobo
12	F	Héctor Romero	January 3, 1980 (age 27)	6 ft 8 in (2.03 m)	(Italy) Scafati Basket
13	F	Alejandro Barrios	April 24, 1979 (age 28)	6 ft 8 in (2.03 m)	(Venezuela) Trotamundos de Carabobo
14	G	Greivis Vasquez	January 16, 1987 (age 20)	6 ft 5 in (1.96 m)	(United States) University of Maryland
15	C	Heberth Bayona	April 26, 1978 (age 29)	6 ft 11 in (2.11 m)	(Venezuela) Guaiqueríes de Margarita

=== Virgin Islands ===
Head coach: (United States) Tevester Anderson

#	Pos	Name	Date of Birth	Height	Club
4	G	Stephen Hodge	July 9, 1977 (age 30)	6 ft 2 in (1.88 m)	(Mexico) Bucaneros de Guaymas
5	G	Kevin Sheppard	September 17, 1979 (age 27)	6 ft 0 in (1.83 m)	(Puerto Rico) Maratonistas de Coamo
6	G	Carl Krauser	May 13, 1981 (age 26)	6 ft 1 in (1.85 m)	(Germany) EWE Baskets Oldenburg
7	G	Cuthbert Victor	January 30, 1983 (age 24)	6 ft 6 in (1.98 m)	(Spain) CAI Zaragoza
8	F	Ja Ja Richards	November 19, 1974 (age 32)	6 ft 10 in (2.08 m)	(Turkey) Mersin Büyükşehir Belediyesi
9	F/G	Jason Edwin	June 24, 1981 (age 26)	6 ft 4 in (1.93 m)	(Germany) Paderborn Baskets
10	F/C	Omari Peterkin	December 29, 1983 (age 23)	6 ft 8 in (2.03 m)	(United States) Boston University
11	F/G	Kaylen Gregory	October 30, 1986 (age 20)	6 ft 3 in (1.91 m)	(United States) Marist College
12	F	Akeem Francis	October 31, 1983 (age 23)	6 ft 6 in (1.98 m)	(United States Virgin Islands) Guidance
13	F	Jameel Heywood	March 19, 1977 (age 30)	6 ft 6 in (1.98 m)	(Venezuela) Gaiteros del Zulia
14	C	Kitwana Rhymer	May 22, 1978 (age 29)	6 ft 10 in (2.08 m)	(United States Virgin Islands) Guidance
15	C	Frank Elegar	December 3, 1986 (age 20)	6 ft 10 in (2.08 m)	(United States) Drexel University
