= Martynas Andriukaitis =

Lithuanian basketball player

Personal information
- Born: March 28, 1981 Kaunas, Lithuanian SSR, Soviet Union
- Died: September 4, 2014 (aged 33) Riga, Latvia
- Listed height: 6 ft 8 in (2.03 m)
- Listed weight: 233 lb (106 kg)

Career information
- Playing career: 2001–2013
- Position: Power forward

Career history
- 2001–2002: Žalgiris
- 2002–2003: Alita
- 2003–2004: Šiauliai
- 2004–2005: JA Vichy
- 2005–2006: Debreceni Vadkakasok
- 2006–2007: ASK Rīga
- 2007–2008: Cherkaski Mavpy
- 2008–2009: Donetsk
- 2009–2010: Dnipro
- 2010–2011: Politekhnika-Halychyna
- 2011: APOEL
- 2011–2012: Liepājas Lauvas
- 2012–2013: Lietkabelis
- 2013: Olimpi Tbilisi

Martynas Andriukaitis (March 28, 1981 – September 4, 2014) was a Lithuanian professional basketball player. He was born in Kaunas.

== Professional career ==
During his pro club career, Andriukaitis won the Lithuanian League championship (2001), and the Latvian League championship (2007). He was also a league runner-up in the North European League, in 2001. He played at the Lithuanian All-Star Game in 2002 and 2003, and at the Ukrainian League's All-Star Game, and the FIBA EuroChallenge All-Star Day, in 2008.

== National team career ==
Andriukaitis was named the MVP of the 2005 FIBA Stanković Continental Champions' Cup, while he was a member of the senior Lithuanian national basketball team.

== Career statistics ==
Legend
GP	Games played	GS	Games started	MPG	Minutes per game
FG%	Field-goal percentage	3P%	3-point field-goal percentage	FT%	Free-throw percentage
RPG	Rebounds per game	APG	Assists per game	SPG	Steals per game
BPG	Blocks per game	PPG	Points per game	PIR	Performance index rating
**Bold**	Career high

=== EuroLeague ===
Year	Team	GP	GS	MPG	FG%	3P%	FT%	RPG	APG	SPG	BPG	PPG	PIR
2000–01	Zalgiris	4	1	19.0	.625	.000	.917	4.0	.3	.3	.5	10.3	12.0

== Death ==
On September 4, 2014, late in the evening, Andriukaitis shot his wife Renata, in his home near Riga, and shot himself, but he was only severely wounded. Their 14-year-old son witnessed what happened and called the police and paramedics. Andriukaitis was taken to hospital, but died there later that night.
