= PalaMangano =

Indoor arena in Scafati, Italy

Coordinates: 40.763316°N 14.517953°E

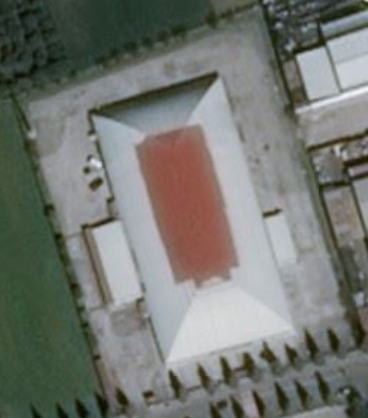
- Interactive map of PalaMangano

PalaMangano is an indoor sporting arena located in Scafati, Italy. The capacity of the arena is 3,500 people and is named after former coach Massimo Mangano. It is currently home of the Scafati Basket basketball team.
