= 2005 FIBA Stanković Continental Champions' Cup =

2005 FIBA Stanković Continental Champions Cup
1st FIBA Stanković Continental Champions Cup

Tournament details
- Host country: China
- Dates: July 26 – 31
- Teams: 6
- Venue: 1 (in 1 host city)

Final positions
- Champions: Lithuania (1st title)

Tournament statistics
- Games played: 15
- MVP: (Lithuania) Martynas Andriukaitis
- Top scorer: (Puerto Rico) Rick Apodaca (20.2 PPG)
- Top rebounds: (Puerto Rico) Manuel Narvaez (9.6 RPG)
- Top assists: (Australia) C. J. Bruton (5.0 APG)
- PPG (Team): Argentina (84.0 PPG)
- RPG (Team): Puerto Rico (28.0 RPG)
- APG (Team): Argentina (13.8 PPG)

The 2005 FIBA Stanković Continental Champions' Cup, or 2005 FIBA Stanković World Cup, was the first edition of the FIBA Stanković Continental Champions' Cup tournament. It was held in Beijing, from July 26 to July 31.

== Participating teams ==
- Angola (FIBA Africa Champions)
- Argentina (2004 Olympic Champions)
- Australia (FIBA Oceania Champions)
- China (FIBA Asia Champions)
- Lithuania (FIBA Europe Champions)
- Puerto Rico (FIBA Americas Championship runner-up)

Teams played a round-robin tournament.

== Results ==
Team	Pld	W	L	PF	PA	PD	Pts	Tie
Lithuania	5	4	1	406	398	+8	9	1–0
Argentina	5	4	1	420	349	+71	9	0–1
Australia	5	3	2	392	382	+10	8	
China	5	2	3	343	366	−23	7	1–0
Angola	5	2	3	350	344	+6	7	0–1
Puerto Rico	5	0	5	383	455	−72	5	

=== Day 1 ===
26 July

Argentina	88–57	Australia

26 July

Angola	61–62	China

26 July

Lithuania	82–73	Puerto Rico

26 Jul – Argentina - Australia 88:57

26 Jul – China - Angola 62:61

26 Jul – Lithuania - Puerto Rico 82:73

27 Jul – Argentina - Angola 83:64

27 Jul – Australia - Puerto Rico 106:78

27 Jul – Lithuania - China 68:66

29 Jul – Angola - Australia 62:49

29 Jul – China - Puerto Rico 91:80

29 Jul – Lithuania - Argentina 83:77

30 Jul – Angola - Puerto Rico 90:73

30 Jul – Argentina - China 86:66

30 Jul – Australia - Lithuania 109:96

31 Jul – Argentina - Puerto Rico 86:79

31 Jul – Australia - China 71:58

31 Jul – Lithuania - Angola 77:73

== Final standings ==
Place	Team	Record
1st place, gold medalist(s)	Lithuania	4–1
2nd place, silver medalist(s)	Argentina	4–1
3rd place, bronze medalist(s)	Australia	3–2
4th	China	2–3
5th	Angola	2–3
6th	Puerto Rico	0–5

== Individual awards ==
=== All-Tournament Team ===
- C. J. Bruton ( Australia)
- Rick Apodaca ( Puerto Rico)
- Zhu Fangyu ( China)
- Martynas Andriukaitis ( Lithuania)
- Gabriel Fernández ( Argentina)

=== Top Scorer ===
- Rick Apodaca ( Puerto Rico)

=== MVP ===
- Martynas Andriukaitis ( Lithuania)
