= Hernán Jasen =

Argentine-Italian basketball player

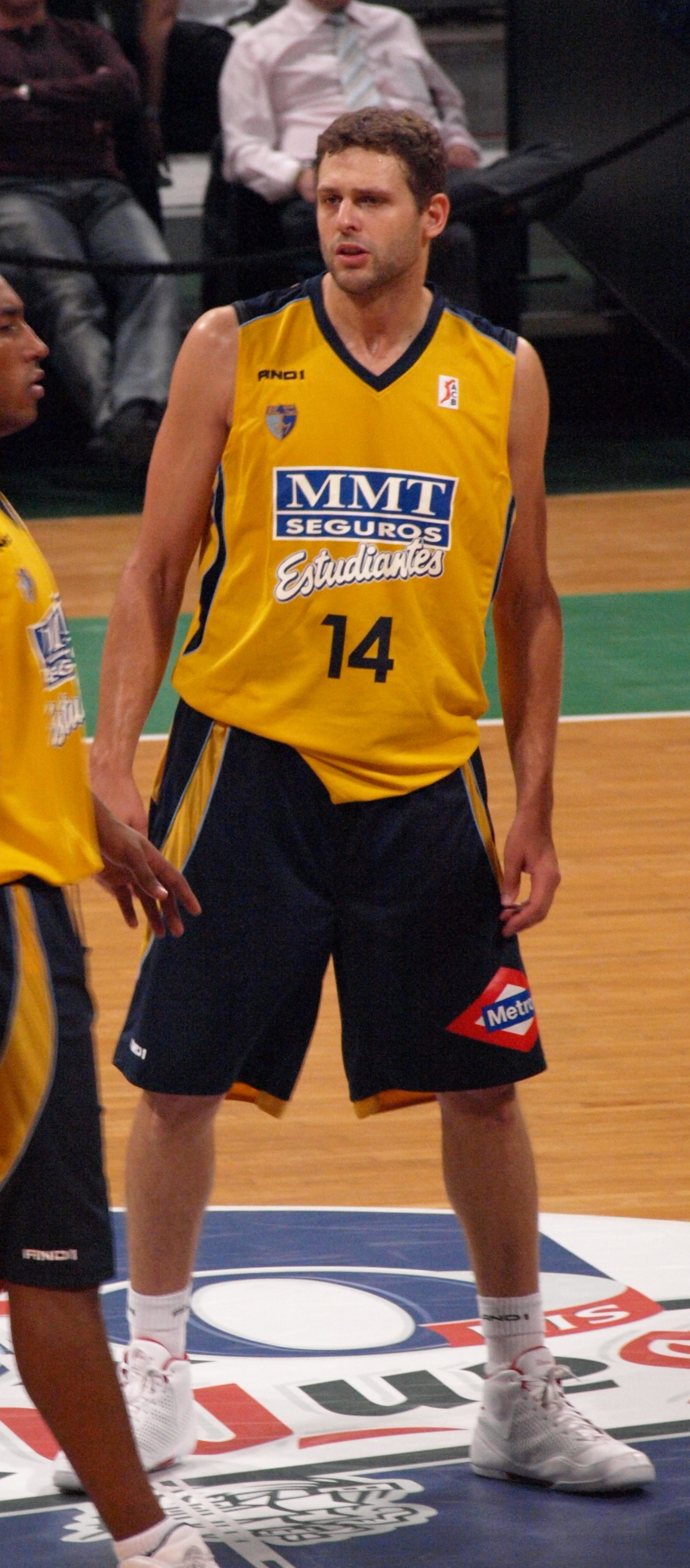
- Jasen with Estudiantes, during the 2008–09 season.

Personal information
- Born: February 4, 1978 (age 48) Bahía Blanca, Argentina
- Listed height: 6 ft 6.5 in (1.99 m)
- Listed weight: 217 lb (98 kg)

Career information
- Playing career: 1995–2018
- Position: Small forward

Career history

Playing
- 1995–1996: Andino La Rioja
- 1996–1999: Estudiantes de Bahía Blanca
- 1999–2001: Gijón Baloncesto
- 2001–2011: Estudiantes
- 2011–2012: Cajasol Sevilla
- 2012–2018: Bahía Basket

Coaching
- 2019: New Orleans Pelicans (assistant)
- 2019–2021: Club Leandro N. Alem (manager)
- 2021–2023: Estudiantes (manager)
- 2024–present: Club Leandro N. Alem (manager)
Medals
Men's basketball
Representing Argentina
FIBA AmeriCup
Silver medal – second place	2005 Santo Domingo
Gold medal – first place	2011 Mar del Plata
FIBA South American Championship
Silver medal – second place	1999 Bahía Blanca
Bronze medal – third place	2006 Caracas
FIBA Stanković Cup
Silver medal – second place	2005 Beijing

Hernán "Pancho" Emilio Jasen Cicarelli (born February 4, 1978) is an Argentine-Italian former professional basketball player. Born in Bahía Blanca, Argentina, and standing at a height of 6'6 1/2" (1.99 m) tall, he played mainly at the small forward position, but he could also play at the shooting guard position.

== Professional career ==
Jasen joined Andino La Rioja of the Argentine League in 1995. He then moved to the Argentine club Estudiantes de Bahía Blanca in 1996. He moved to the Spanish League team Gijón Baloncesto in 1999.

In 2001, he then joined the Spanish club Estudiantes, whom he also played with in the Euroleague and the Eurocup competitions. He was later named the captain of Estudiantes. In 2011, he moved to the Spanish club Cajasol Sevilla.

== National team career ==
Jasen won the 1996 South American U-18 Championship with Argentina's junior national team. He won the silver medal at the 1999 South American Championship. He also played for the silver-medal winning senior Argentine national basketball team at the 2005 FIBA Americas Championship.

He also won the bronze medal at the 2006 South American Championship, before a four-year hiatus from the national team. Jasen was again called to the national team for the 2010 FIBA World Championship. With Argentina leading by one point in its first game during the tournament, he had a key steal against Germany's Demond Greene, with ten seconds left in the game, to help preserve the team's victory.

He won the gold medal at the 2011 FIBA Americas Championship.

== EuroLeague statistics ==
Legend
GP	Games played	GS	Games started	MPG	Minutes per game
FG%	Field-goal percentage	3P%	3-point field-goal percentage	FT%	Free-throw percentage
RPG	Rebounds per game	APG	Assists per game	SPG	Steals per game
BPG	Blocks per game	PPG	Points per game	PIR	Performance index rating
**Bold**	Career high

Year	Team	GP	GS	MPG	FG%	3P%	FT%	RPG	APG	SPG	BPG	PPG	PIR
2004–05	Estudiantes	13	10	23.3	.421	.226	.689	5.5	2.1	1.2	.4	10.7	12.1
Career		13	10	23.3	.421	.226	.689	5.5	2.1	1.2	.4	10.7	12.1

== Awards and accomplishments ==
=== Argentine national team ===
- 1996 South American U-18 Championship: Gold
- 1999 South American Championship: Silver
- 2005 Stanković Continental Champions' Cup: Silver
- 2005 FIBA Americas Championship: Silver
- 2006 South American Championship: Bronze
- 2011 FIBA Americas Championship: Gold

=== Club team ===
- Number **5** retired by Estudiantes de Bahía Blanca in 2018
