= Antonio Porta (basketball) =

Argentine-Italian basketball player

Personal information
- Born: October 28, 1983 (age 43) Fimat, Argentina
- Listed height: 1.88 m (6 ft 2 in)
- Listed weight: 95 kg (209 lb)

Career information
- Playing career: 2000–2017
- Position: Point guard
- Number: 5

Career history
- 2000–2002: Echagüe Paraná
- 2002: Andrea Costa Imola
- 2002–2006: Basket Livorno
- 2006–2007: Angelico Biella
- 2007–2008: Spartak Saint Petersburg
- 2008–2010: Air Avellino
- 2010–2012: Scaligera Basket Verona
- 2012–2013: Scafati Basket
- 2013: Valladolid
- 2013–2016: Svendborg Rabbits
- 2016: Amici Pallacanestro Udinese
- 2016–2017: Svendborg Rabbits
Medals
Men's basketball
Representing Argentina
Summer Olympic Games
Bronze medal – third place	2008 Beijing
FIBA Diamond Ball
Gold medal – first place	2008 Nanjing
FIBA AmeriCup
Silver medal – second place	2005 Santo Domingo
Silver medal – second place	2007 Las Vegas
FIBA South American Championship
Bronze medal – third place	2006 Caracas

Antonio Alejandro Porta Pernigotti (born 28 October 1983) is a former Argentine-Italian professional basketball player, who lasted played with the Svendborg Rabbits in the Danish Basketball League. He played at both the point guard and shooting guard positions. Porta is now a basketball coach on the "Svendborg Efterskole" in Svendborg, Denmark. He is the coach of a group of young teenagers.

== Professional career ==
Porta played with several clubs in the Italian League, and also in the Spanish League and the Russian Super League.

== National team career ==
Porta was a member of the senior Argentine national basketball team. He made his debut with the national team at the 2005 Stanković Continental Champions' Cup. He also played with Argentina at the 2005 FIBA Americas Championship, the 2006 South American Championship, and the 2007 FIBA Americas Championship. He was also a part of the Argentina squad that won a bronze medal at the 2008 Summer Olympic Games.
