= Diego Lo Grippo =

Argentine-Italian basketball player

Diego Fernando Lo Grippo (born January 22, 1978) is an Argentine-Italian professional basketball player. He is 1.98 m (6 ft 6 in) tall, and he plays the positions of small forward and power forward. He also holds Italian nationality.

== Professional career ==
Lo Grippo was the Argentine League Finals MVP in 2003.

=== Pro clubs ===
- 1998–2001: Ferro Carril Oeste
- 2001–2002: Estudiantes de Olavarria
- 2002–2003: Atenas
- 2003–2005: Cantabria Baloncesto
- 2005–2009: Autocid Ford Burgos
- 2009–2010: Atenas
- 2010–2013: Quimsa
- 2013–2014: Libertad de Sunchales
- 2014–2018: Atenas
- 2019: San Lorenzo

== National team career ==
Lo Grippo debuted for the Argentina national team in 2003, in a game against Chile.

=== Argentina national team honours ===
Diego Lo Grippo
Medal record

Men's basketball

Representing Argentina

FIBA AmeriCup
Silver medal – second place	2005 Santo Domingo	
Silver medal – second place	2007 Las Vegas	

FIBA South American Championship
Silver medal – second place	2003 Montevideo	
Bronze medal – third place	2006 Caracas	

- 2003 South American Championship: Silver
- 2005 FIBA Americas Championship: Silver
- 2005 Stanković Cup: Silver
- 2006 South American Championship: Bronze
- 2007 Pan American Games: (fourth place)
- 2007 FIBA Americas Championship: Silver
