= Jack Michael Martínez =

Dominican Republic basketball player

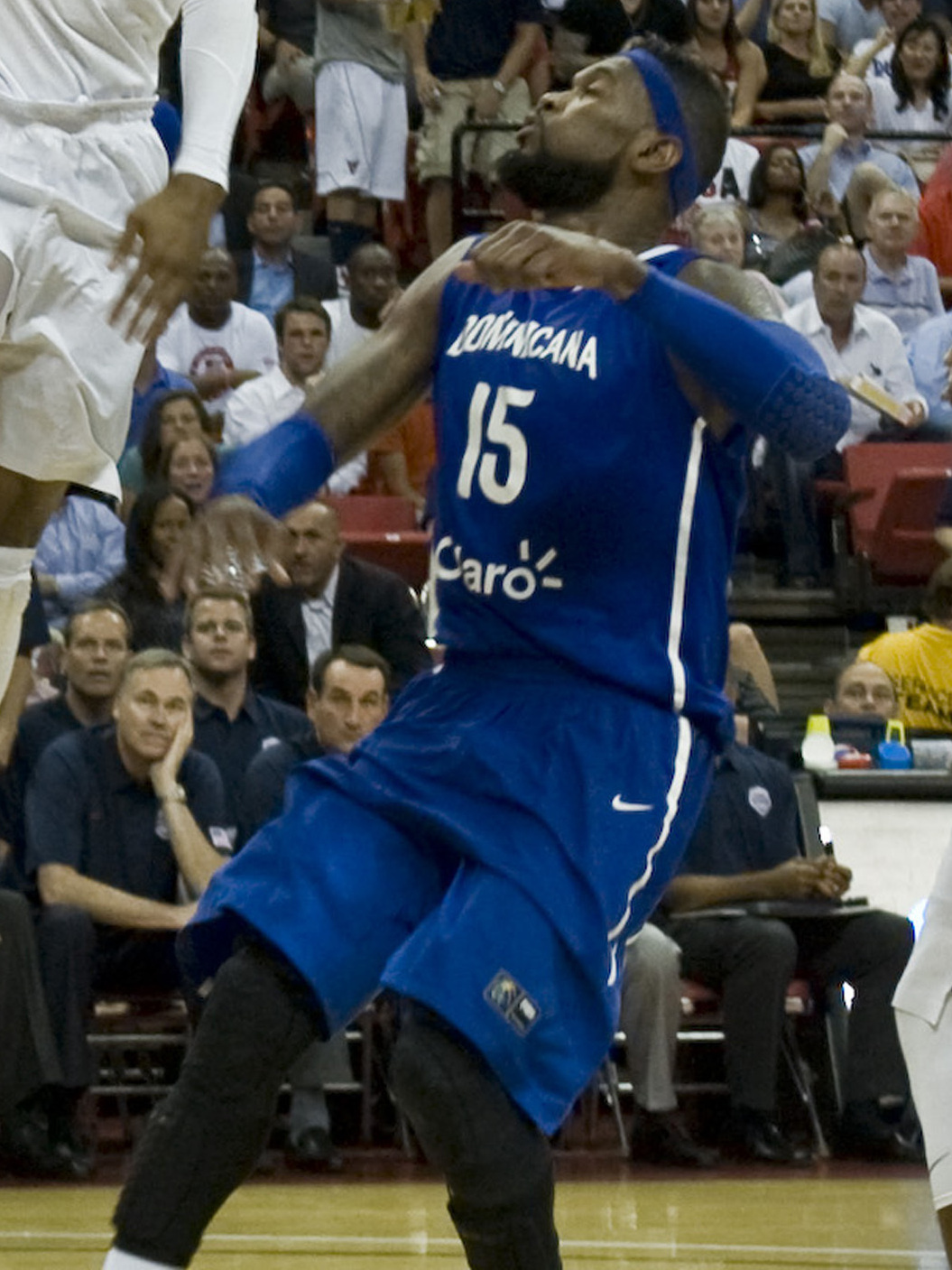
- Martínez with the Dominican Republic national basketball team in 2012

Personal information
- Born: October 12, 1981 (age 45) Santo Domingo, Dominican Republic
- Listed height: 6 ft 9 in (2.06 m)
- Listed weight: 260 lb (118 kg)

Career information
- High school: Artesia (Lakewood, California)
- Playing career: 2002–2016
- Position: Power forward / center

Career history
- 2002: JL Bourg
- 2003: Paris Basket Racing
- 2005: Atléticos de San Germán
- 2005–2006: Roseto
- 2006–2007: Scafati
- 2007: Teramo
- 2008: Cocodrilos de Caracas
- 2008: Grises de Humacao
- 2008–2009: Halcones Rojos Veracruz
- 2010–2012: Cocodrilos de Caracas
- 2013: Guaros de Lara
- 2013: Capitanes de Arecibo
- 2013: Trotamundos
- 2014: Leones de Santo Domingo
- 2015: Trotamundos
- 2016: Metros de Santiago
- 2016: Caciques de Humacao

Career highlights
- Liga Nacional de Básquet rebounding leader (2012)
Medals
Men's basketball
Representing the Dominican Republic
FIBA AmeriCup
Bronze medal – third place	2011 Argentina
Pan American Games
Silver medal – second place	2003 Dominican Republic
Centrobasket
Gold medal – first place	2004 Dominican Republic
Silver medal – second place	2010 Dominican Republic
Bronze medal – third place	2008 Mexico	Team
Central American and Caribbean Games
Bronze medal – third place	2006 Colombia
FIBA CBC Championship
Silver medal – second place	2007 Puerto Rico

Jack Michael Martínez (born October 12, 1981) is a Dominican former professional basketball player.

== High school career ==
Jack Martinez attended Artesia High School in Lakewood, California, playing alongside Jason Kapono and Jón Arnór Stefánsson. It later emerged he and other foreign players on the team had been illegally recruited by coach Wayne Merino.

== Professional career ==
Martinez's career took him to Venezuela, Puerto Rico, Italy where he was the Lega Basket Serie A top rebounder in 2006, the Dominican Republic, and Mexico.

== National team career ==
Martínez made his debut for the Dominican Republic national basketball team in 2001. He was named MVP at the 2004 Centrobasket in Santo Domingo, Dominican Republic, where his team claimed the gold medal by defeating Puerto Rico in the final.
