= James Gillingham (basketball) =

Personal information
- Born: August 20, 1981 (age 45) Hamilton, Ontario, Canada
- Listed height: 6 ft 3 in (1.91 m)

Career information
- College: Bradley
- Position: Shooting guard / small forward

Career history
- 2000–2004: Bradley Braves (NCAA)
- 2004–2010: TBB TrierUSDEU
- 2005: Canada

James R. Gillingham (born August 20, 1981) is a retired Canadian basketball player. Gillingham played professionally in the German Bundesliga for TBB Trier from 2004 until 2010.

== Education and career ==
Gillingham was born in Hamilton, Ontario. He graduated from Bradley University in Peoria, Illinois, where he was a member of the NCAA's Missouri Valley Conference basketball team from 2000 to 2004. Gillingham was named to the MVC All-Conference Second Team in 2003 and 2004, to the MVC All-Defensive Team in 2002, 2003, and 2004, to the MVC All-Freshman Team in 2001, and to the MVC Most Improved Team in 2002 and 2003.

Gillingham signed a deal with the German first division club TBB Trier in 2004 after ending his NCAA career. He remained with TBB his entire career, retiring in 2010 after serving as team captain for 5 years. Following his retirement, Gillingham returned to his hometown and served as an Assistant Coach for the University of Guelph Gryphons Men's Basketball team.

Gillingham lives in Ontario, Canada, and is married with three children.
