= Ron Slay =

American basketball player (born 1981)

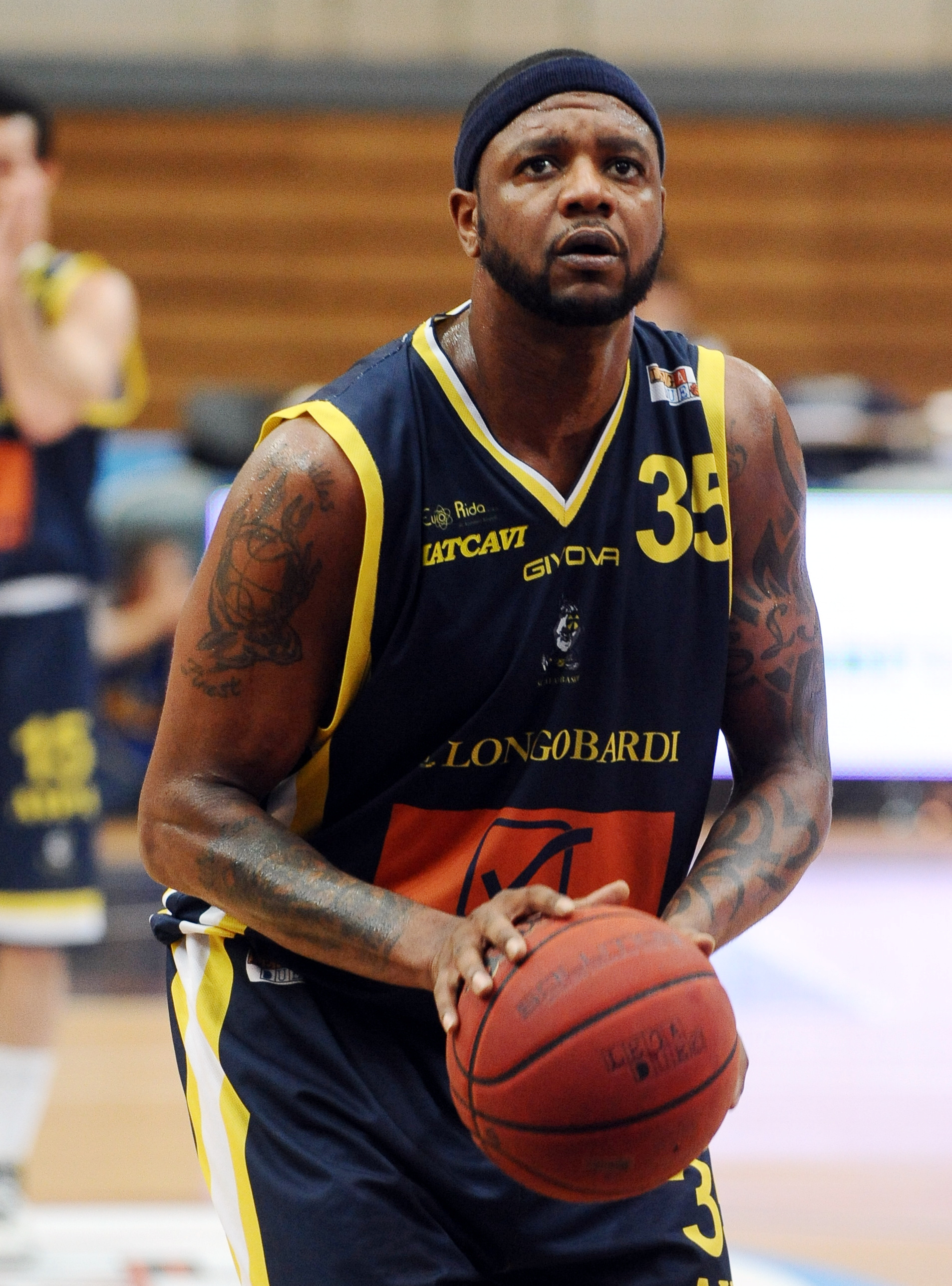
- Slay with Givova Scafati in 2013

Personal information
- Born: June 29, 1981 (age 45) Memphis, Tennessee, U.S.
- Listed height: 6 ft 8 in (2.03 m)
- Listed weight: 240 lb (109 kg)

Career information
- High school: Oak Hill Academy (Mouth of Wilson, Virginia)
- College: Tennessee (1999–2003)
- NBA draft: 2003: undrafted
- Playing career: 2003–2016
- Position: Power forward
- Number: 35

Career history
- 2003–2004: Galatasaray
- 2004: Cocodrilos de Caracas
- 2004–2005: Asheville Altitude
- 2005–2006: Maccabi Giv'at Shmuel
- 2006: Curtiriso Casale Monferrato
- 2006: Ciudad de Huelva
- 2006–2007: Premiata Montegranaro
- 2007–2008: Scavolini Pesaro
- 2008: Grises de Humacao
- 2008–2009: Eldo Caserta
- 2009–2011: Cimberio Varese
- 2011: Levski Sofia
- 2011–2012: Sidigas Avellino
- 2012–2013: Givova Scafati
- 2013–2014: Châlons Reims
- 2014–2015: Benfica
- 2016: Lugano Tigers
- 2016: Lille Métropole

Career highlights
- All-NBDL Second Team (2005); Third-team All-American – AP (2003); SEC Player of the Year – AP (2003)

Ronald Sylvester Slay (born June 29, 1981) is an American former professional basketball player. He was the Southeastern Conference player of the year and an All-American as a senior at Tennessee.

== College career ==
Ron Slay played for Pearl-Cohn High School in Nashville, Tennessee before transferring to prep powerhouse Oak Hill Academy and then heading to the University of Tennessee. As a freshman in 1999–2000, Slay averaged 9.7 points and 4.4 rebounds per game as the Volunteers went 26–7 and won the SEC. In the 2000 NCAA Tournament, Slay and the Vols made their first Sweet Sixteen appearance since 1981. The next season, Slay upped his averages to 12.9 points and 5.3 rebounds per game. He was named third team all-conference and team MVP.

Slay was poised to have another strong year as a junior, as he became a regular starter for the Volunteers and again showed improvement in his production, raising his averages to 14.8 points and 6.3 rebounds per game. However, Slay tore his anterior cruciate ligament and was limited to 14 games. After rehabbing during the offseason, Slay had a breakout year as a senior. He averaged 21.2 points and 7.8 rebounds per game and was named the Associated Press SEC Player of the Year and a third team All-American.

== Professional career ==
Following the conclusion of his college career, Slay went undrafted in the 2003 NBA draft. He took part in the Orlando Summer League as a member of the Miami Heat's entry, however he did not make the team. He instead signed with Galatasaray Café Crown of the Turkish Basketball League. This began an international basketball career that would take Slay to Israel, Venezuela, Italy, Spain, and Puerto Rico. Slay also played a season for the Asheville Altitude of the NBDL, where he was named second team all-league.

On September 17, 2012, Slay signed with Scafati Basket of Italy's Legadue. In the summer of 2013, he signed with Châlons Reims.

In August 2014, he signed with Benfica of the Liga Portuguesa de Basquetebol for the 2014–15 season.

== Honours ==
Benfica

- Portuguese League: 2014–15
- Portuguese Cup: 2014–15
- Portuguese SuperCup: 2014
- Hugo dos Santos Cup: 2014–15
- António Pratas Trophy: 2014

== The Basketball Tournament (TBT) ==
In the summer of 2017, Slay competed in The Basketball Tournament on ESPN for the City of Gods. In their first-round matchup, Slay scored 14 points in 21 minutes in the City of Gods' 88–86 loss to Gael Nation, a team composed of Iona College basketball alum.
