= Julio Mázzaro =

Argentine-Italian basketball player

Julio Eduardo Mázzaro (born 30 January 1979 in Villa Regina, Río Negro) is a former Argentine professional basketball player. He also holds an Italian passport. At a height of 1.90 m (6 ft 2 3/4 in) tall, he played at the shooting guard position.

== Professional career ==
Mázzaro played with River Plate and Boca Juniors in Argentina, and Edimes Pavia ('03–'04) in the Italian 2nd Division. He also played with Quimsa in Argentina. He was named the MVP of the second FIBA South American League tournament in 2009.

== National team career ==
Mázzaro represented the Argentine national basketball team on a number of occasions, including the FIBA AmeriCup of 2005, the Stanković Cup, and the FIBA South American Championships in 2003 and 2004.
