= Richard Lugo (basketball) =

Venezuelan basketball player (born 1973)

Personal information
- Born: May 7, 1973 (age 53) Calabozo, Guárico, Venezuela
- Listed height: 6 ft 10 in (2.08 m)
- Listed weight: 235 lb (107 kg)

Career information
- College: St. Francis (NY) (1996–97)
- Playing career: 1995–present
- Position: Center

Career history
- VEN (Venezuela): Panteras de Miranda
- COL (Colombia): Los Canoneros
- PUR (Puerto Rico): Vaqueros de Bayamón, Cangrejero de Santurce, Capitanes de Arecibo, Atletico de San German
- CHN (China): Jiangsu Dragons
- ESP (Spain): Porriño Baloncesto
- POL (Poland): Śląsk Wrocław
- VEN (Venezuela): Trotamundos de Carabobo
- MEX (Mexico): Halcones UV Córdoba
- VEN (Venezuela): Bucaneros de La Guaira
- PUR (Puerto Rico): Cangrejeros de Santurce
- VEN (Venezuela): Guaiqueríes de Margarita

Richard Lugo
Medal record

Men's basketball

Representing Venezuela

FIBA AmeriCup
Bronze medal – third place	2005 Santo Domingo	

FIBA South American Championship
Bronze medal – third place	2001 Valdivia	
Bronze medal – third place	2004 Rio de Janeiro	

Richard Lugo (born May 7, 1973, in Calabozo, Guárico, Venezuela) is a Venezuelan professional basketball player currently signed with the Venezuelan team Guaiqueríes de Margarita.

== Early life and college career ==
Lugo was born on May 7, 1973, in Calabozo, Guárico, Venezuela. He attended St. Francis College in New York, where he played one season of NCAA Division I college basketball. As a freshman starting center for the Terriers, he averaged 9.5 points, 8.1 rebounds, and 4.5 blocks per game.

== Professional career ==
After his college career, Lugo turned professional, signing with Panteras de Miranda in Venezuela in 1995. Throughout his 20-year career, he has played for various teams across Latin America, Europe, and China. His career highlights include:

- Playing in Venezuela for teams like Panteras de Miranda, Trotamundos de Carabobo, Bucaneros de La Guaira, and Guaiqueríes de Margarita.
- Playing in Puerto Rico for Vaqueros de Bayamón, Cangrejeros de Santurce, Capitanes de Arecibo, and Atleticos de San German. He was a champion with Capitanes de Arecibo in 2005 and participated with Atleticos de San German in 2008.
- Brief stints in China with Jiangsu Dragons, Spain with Porriño Baloncesto, and Poland with Śląsk Wrocław.
- Playing in Mexico with Halcones UV Córdoba and Colombia with Los Canoneros.

Lugo has made a name for himself as a dominant defensive player, being named the Venezuelan Player of the Year in 1998. He earned a spot on the Venezuelan All-Defensive Team four times (2000, 2005–2007) and was a two-time Puerto Rican League Defensive Player of the Year (2003–2004).

In 2016, Lugo became the all-time leading rebounder in the Professional Basketball League of Venezuela (LPB), surpassing 6,000 career rebounds.

== National team career ==
Lugo has been a regular member of the Venezuela national basketball team since 1998. He participated in the 2002 FIBA World Championship and 2006 FIBA World Championship, leading the team in rebounds at both tournaments. He also helped the team win bronze medals at the 2005 FIBA Americas Championship and the South American Basketball Championship in 2001 and 2004.

== Honors and awards ==
- Venezuelan Player of the Year (1998)
- Venezuelan All-Defensive Team (2000, 2005–2007)
- Puerto Rican League Defensive Player of the Year (2003, 2004)
- FIBA Americas Championship Bronze Medal (2005)
- South American Championship Bronze Medal (2001, 2004)
