= Óscar Torres (basketball) =

Venezuelan basketball player (born 1976)

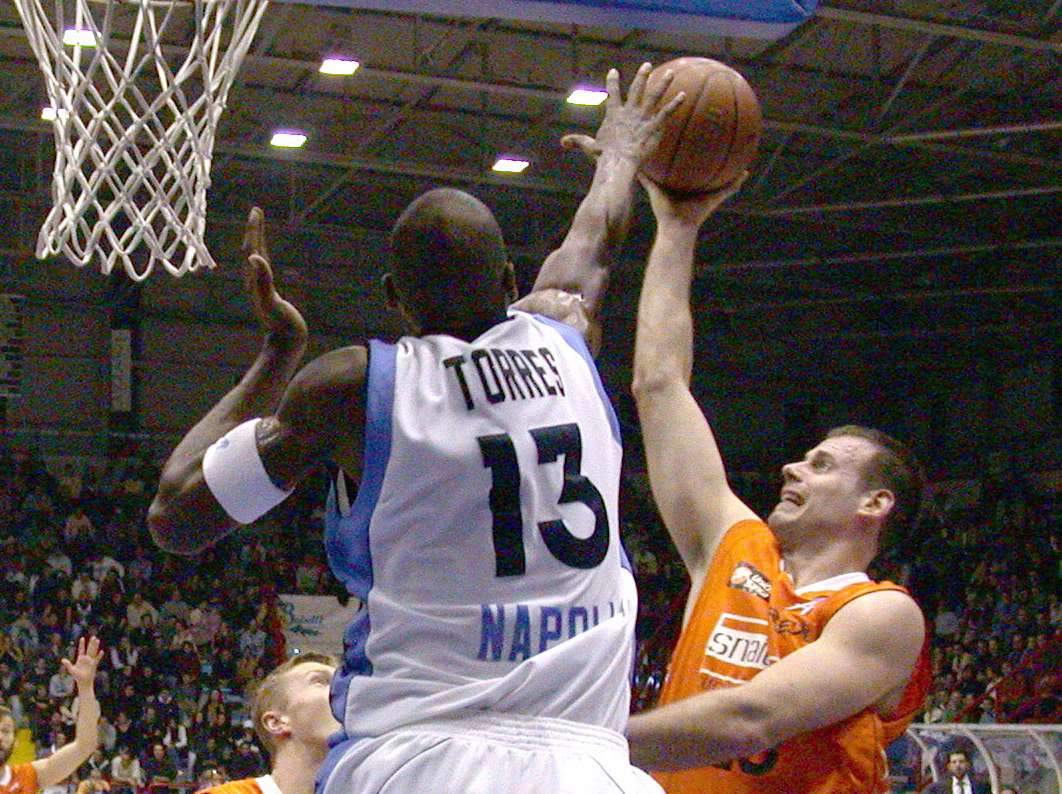
- Blocked shot by Oscar Torres

Personal information
- Born: December 18, 1976 (age 49) Caracas, Venezuela
- Listed height: 6 ft 6 in (1.98 m)
- Listed weight: 210 lb (95 kg)

Career information
- NBA draft: 1998: undrafted
- Playing career: 1997–2017
- Position: Small forward / shooting guard
- Number: 18, 13

Career history
- 1997–1998: Marinos de Oriente
- 1999–2000: Trotamundos de Carabobo
- 2000: Billings RimRockers
- 2001–2002: Houston Rockets
- 2002: Marinos de Oriente
- 2002: Golden State Warriors
- 2003: Marinos de Oriente
- 2003–2004: SS Basket Napoli
- 2004–2007: Khimki Moscow
- 2007: CSKA Moscow
- 2007–2008: Fortitudo Bologna
- 2008: Marinos de Anzoategui
- 2008–2009: Snaidero Udine
- 2009: Türk Telekom
- 2009–2011: Marinos de Anzoategui
- 2011–2012: Tarragona
- 2012–2017: Marinos de Anzoategui
- Stats at NBA.com
- Stats at Basketball Reference
Medals
Men's basketball
Representing Venezuela
FIBA AmeriCup
Bronze medal – third place	2005 Santo Domingo
FIBA South American Championship
Bronze medal – third place	2001 Valdivia
Bronze medal – third place	2004 Rio de Janeiro
Bronze medal – third place	2008 Puerto Montt

Óscar José Torres Martínez (born December 18, 1976) is a Venezuelan former professional basketball player. A 6'6" native of Caracas, Torres played at the shooting guard and small forward positions.

== Professional career ==
Torres became the first Venezuelan-born player in National Basketball Association (NBA) history, when he signed with the Houston Rockets, for the 2001–02 NBA season. Torres averaged 6.0 points over the course of the season, and scored an NBA career-high 28 points against the Cleveland Cavaliers, on December 11, 2001. He spent the next season with the Golden State Warriors, and averaged 3.1 points per game.

Torres led the Russian team Khimki Moscow Region to the 2006 EuroCup finals, before losing to DKV Joventut. Torres was transferred CSKA Moscow, from Khimki, in February 2007, and with them, he won the Russian Championship and the Russian Cup.

He was released from CSKA in June that year. On August 21, 2007, he signed with the Italian League team Climamio Bologna.

== National team career ==
Torres also played with the senior Venezuelan national basketball team at the 2002 and 2006 editions of the FIBA World Cups.

== Career statistics ==
Legend
GP	Games played	GS	Games started	MPG	Minutes per game
FG%	Field-goal percentage	3P%	3-point field-goal percentage	FT%	Free-throw percentage
RPG	Rebounds per game	APG	Assists per game	SPG	Steals per game
BPG	Blocks per game	PPG	Points per game	PIR	Performance index rating
**Bold**	Career high

=== NBA ===
==== Regular season ====
Year	Team	GP	GS	MPG	FG%	3P%	FT%	RPG	APG	SPG	BPG	PPG
2001–02	Houston	**65**	**13**	**16.5**	.396	.294	**.781**	**1.9**	**.6**	**.4**	**.1**	**6.0**
2002–03	Golden State	17	0	6.4	**.444**	**.538**	.700	.7	.2	.2	**.1**	3.1
Career		82	13	14.4	.401	.317	.786	1.6	.5	.4	.1	5.4

=== EuroLeague ===
Year	Team	GP	GS	MPG	FG%	3P%	FT%	RPG	APG	SPG	BPG	PPG	PIR
2006–07	CSKA Moscow	10	9	23.1	.500	.483	.611	4.6	.9	1.1	.1	8.7	10.6
Career		10	9	23.1	.500	.483	.611	4.6	.9	1.1	.1	8.7	10.6
