= Tang Hamilton =

American basketball player (born 1978)

Personal information
- Born: May 26, 1978 (age 48) Jackson, Mississippi, U.S.
- Listed height: 6 ft 7 in (2.01 m)
- Listed weight: 220 lb (100 kg)

Career information
- High school: Lanier (Jackson, Mississippi)
- College: Mississippi State (1997–2001)
- NBA draft: 2001: undrafted
- Playing career: 2001–2012
- Position: Forward
- Number: 8

Career history
- 2001: Miami Heat
- 2002–2003: Columbus Riverdragons
- 2003–2004: BC Azovmash
- 2004–2005: Fayetteville Patriots
- 2006: Tulsa 66ers
- 2006: Incheon ET Land Black Slamer
- 2006: Ironi Ashkelon
- 2007–2008: Guaros de Lara
- 2008: Club Biguá de Villa Biarritz
- 2008: Belgrano de San Nicolás
- 2008–2009: Dorados de Chihuahua
- 2010: Gaiteros del Zulia
- 2010: Cocodrilos de Caracas
- 2012: Panteras de Miranda

Career highlights
- All-NBDL First Team (2003); Mississippi Mr. Basketball (1997)
- Stats at NBA.com
- Stats at Basketball Reference

Tephen "Tang" Hamilton (born May 26, 1978) is an American former professional basketball player. He played in the National Basketball Association (NBA) for the Miami Heat during the 2001–02 season. Hamilton played college basketball for the Mississippi State Bulldogs.

== Life and career ==
=== Early life ===
Born in Jackson, Mississippi, Hamilton was named Mississippi Mr. Basketball during his senior season at Lanier High School.

=== NBA ===
Hamilton played in the NBA from October 2001 to November 2001, appeared in nine games for the Miami Heat, and averaged 2.2 points and 2.0 rebounds. His final game was on November 27, 2001, in a 83–84 loss to the Boston Celtics where he played for two minutes and recorded no stats outside of a missed three-pointer.

== Career statistics ==
Legend
GP	Games played	GS	Games started	MPG	Minutes per game
FG%	Field goal percentage	3P%	3-point field goal percentage	FT%	Free throw percentage
RPG	Rebounds per game	APG	Assists per game	SPG	Steals per game
BPG	Blocks per game	PPG	Points per game	**Bold**	Career high

=== NBA ===
==== Regular season ====
Year	Team	GP	GS	MPG	FG%	3P%	FT%	RPG	APG	SPG	BPG	PPG
2001–02	Miami	9	2	10.9	.526	.000	.000	2.0	.6	.4	.0	2.2
