= Kris Lang =

American basketball player (born 1979)

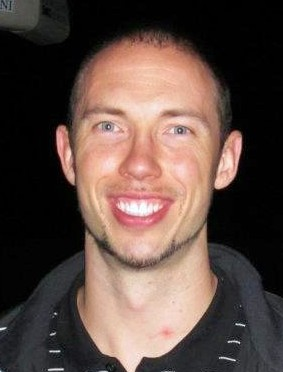
- Lang in 2011

Personal information
- Born: December 12, 1979 (age 46) Gastonia, North Carolina, U.S.
- Listed height: 6 ft 11 in (2.11 m)
- Listed weight: 246 lb (112 kg)

Career information
- High school: Hunter Huss (Gastonia, North Carolina)
- College: North Carolina (1998–2002)
- NBA draft: 2002: undrafted
- Playing career: 2002–2018
- Position: Center

Career history
- 2002–2003: Anwil Włocławek
- 2003–2004: Asheville Altitude
- 2004–2005: Seoul SK Knights
- 2005: Unicaja Málaga
- 2005–2007: Virtus Bologna
- 2007: Azovmash Mariupol
- 2007–2008: Austin Toros
- 2008–2010: Türk Telekom
- 2010–2011: Enel Brindisi
- 2011–2012: Virtus Bologna
- 2013–2016: Cocodrilos de Caracas
- 2015: Metros de Santiago
- 2016: Regatas Corrientes
- 2016: Defensor Sporting
- 2017: Bucaneros de La Guaira
- 2018: Panteras de Miranda

Career highlights
- LPB champion (2013); Turkish Presidential Cup winner (2008); Turkish Cup winner (2008); KBL All-Star (2005); NBDL champion (2004); PLK champion (2003); ACC All-Freshman Team (1999); Fourth-team Parade All-American (1998); McDonald's All-American Game (1998); North Carolina Mr. Basketball (1998)

Kristoffer Douglas Lang (born December 12, 1979) is an American professional basketball player. He played college basketball for North Carolina between 1998 and 2002 before playing professionally in Poland, NBA D-League, South Korea, Spain, Italy, Ukraine, Turkey, Venezuela, Dominican Republic, Argentina, and Uruguay.

== College career ==
Lang played college basketball for North Carolina between 1998 and 2002. In 128 career games, he averaged 10.9 points and 5.3 rebounds per game.

== Professional career ==
Lang made his professional debut in Poland, spending the 2002–03 season with Anwil Włocławek and winning the PLK championship. For the 2003–04 season, he returned to the U.S. and helped the Asheville Altitude win the NBDL championship. For the 2004–05 season, he moved to South Korea to play for the Seoul SK Knights. He finished the season in Spain with Unicaja Málaga. The next two seasons were spent in Italy with Virtus Bologna.

After spending preseason with the San Antonio Spurs in the NBA in October 2007, Lang moved to Ukraine for a short stint with Azovmash Mariupol. He returned to the U.S. in December 2007 to join the Austin Toros. He left the Toros in February 2008 and moved to Turkey to play for Türk Telekom. He continued on with Türk Telekom for the 2008–09 and 2009–10 seasons. Lang returned to Italy for the 2010–11 season to play for Enel Brindisi. He remained in Italy for the 2011–12 season, re-joining Virtus Bologna.

In 2013, Lang began what would be a six-year stint in South America. He played six seasons in the Venezuelan LPB (Cocodrilos de Caracas 2013–16; Bucaneros de La Guaira 2017; Panteras de Miranda 2018), a season in the Dominican Republic (Metros de Santiago 2015), half a season in Argentina (Regatas Corrientes 2016), and half a season in Uruguay (Defensor Sporting 2016).
