= KK Świecie =

KK Świecie is a Polish basketball club, based in Świecie. It currently plays in the III Liga, the fourth tier in Poland. The club played in the first tier Polish Basketball League in years 2005–2008.

== Team history ==
- I Liga
  - Winners (1): 2004–05
