= Gabriel Fernández (basketball) =

Argentine-Italian basketball player

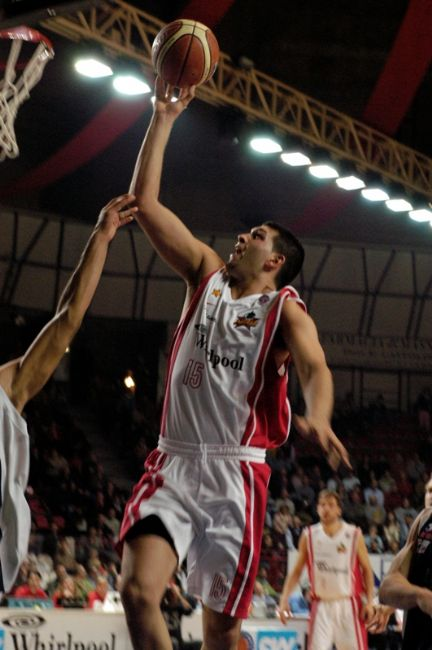
- Fernández with Pallacanestro Varese .

Personal information
- Born: October 23, 1976 (age 50) Lomas de Zamora, Argentina
- Listed height: 6 ft 8 in (2.03 m)
- Listed weight: 259 lb (117 kg)

Career information
- Playing career: 1995–2018
- Position: Power forward / center

Career history
- 1995–1996: Ferro Carril Oeste (Argentina)
- 1996–2000: Boca Juniors
- 2000–2001: Estudiantes de Olavarría
- 2001–2002: STB Le Havre
- 2002: Tau Cerámica
- 2002–2004: Fórum Filatélico
- 2004–2005: Plus Pujol Lleida
- 2005–2008: Pallacanestro Varese
- 2008: Boca Juniors
- 2008: Marinos de Anzoátegui
- 2008–2009: Boca Juniors
- 2009–2010: Obras Sanitarias
- 2010–2011: Lanús
- 2011–2013: Independiente de Avellaneda
- 2013–2015: Peñarol de Mar del Plata
- 2015: Centro Deportivo Huracán
- 2017–2018: Burzaco

Career highlights
- Spanish League champion (2002); Spanish Cup winner (2002); Pan American Club Championship champion (2000); South American League champion (2001); 2× Argentine League champion (2001, 2014)
Medals
Men's basketball
Representing Argentina
Summer Olympic Games
Gold medal – first place	2004 Athens
FIBA World Cup
Silver medal – second place	2002 Indianapolis
FIBA AmeriCup
Bronze medal – third place	1999 San Juan
Gold medal – first place	2001 Neuquén
Silver medal – second place	2003 San Juan
Silver medal – second place	2005 Santo Domingo
FIBA South American Championship
Silver medal – second place	1995 Montevideo
Bronze medal – third place	1997 Maracaibo
Gold medal – first place	2001 Valdivia
Silver medal – second place	2003 Montevideo

Gabriel Diego Fernández (born October 23, 1976) is a former Argentine-Italian professional basketball player.

== Professional career ==
In his pro career, Fernández played with numerous clubs, including Boca Juniors in the Argentine league.

== National team career ==
As a member of Argentina's junior national teams, Fernández played at the 1995 FIBA Under-19 World Cup, and the 1997 FIBA Under-21 World Cup.

As a member of the senior men's Argentine national team, he played at the following tournaments: the 1995 FIBA South American Championship, the 1997 FIBA South American Championship, the 1997 FIBA AmeriCup, the 1998 FIBA World Cup, the 1999 Pan American Games, the 1999 FIBA AmeriCup (bronze medal), the 2001 FIBA South American Championship (gold medal), the 2001 FIBA AmeriCup (gold medal), the 2002 FIBA World Cup (silver medal), the 2003 FIBA South American Championship (gold medal), the 2003 FIBA AmeriCup (silver medal), and the 2005 FIBA AmeriCup (silver medal).

He was also a member of Argentina's 2004 Summer Olympic Games gold medal-winning team.

== Awards and honors ==
=== Pro clubs ===
- Pan American Club Championship Champion: (2000)
- South American League Champion: (2001)
- Argentine League All-Star Game: (2001)
- 2× Argentine League Champion: (2001, 2014)
- Spanish Cup Winner: (2002)
- Spanish League Champion: (2002)

=== Argentine national team ===
- 1995 FIBA South American Championship: Silver
- 1997 FIBA South American Championship: Bronze
- 1999 FIBA AmeriCup: Bronze
- 2001 FIBA South American Championship: Gold
- 2001 FIBA AmeriCup: Gold
- 2002 FIBA World Cup: Silver
- 2003 FIBA South American Championship: Silver
- 2003 FIBA AmeriCup: Silver
- 2004 Summer Olympics: Gold
- 2005 FIBA AmeriCup: Silver
