= Daniel Farabello =

Argentine-Italian basketball player

Dani Farabello
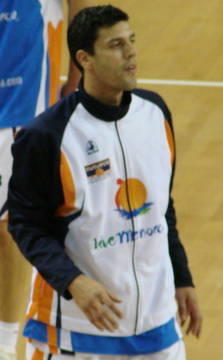
- Farabello with Menorca Bàsquet in 2007.

Personal information
- Born: 18 October 1973 (age 53) Colón, Entre Ríos
- Listed height: 6 ft 4.5 in (1.94 m)
- Listed weight: 216 lb (98 kg)

Career information
- Playing career: 1991–2014
- Position: Point guard / shooting guard

Career history
- 1991–1995: Sport Club Cañadense
- 1995–1997: Andino Sport Club
- 1997–1999: Club Atlético Boca Juniors
- 1999–2001: Club Atlético Estudiantes (Olavarría)
- 2001–2002: Quilmes Mar del Plata
- 2002–2003: Vasco da Gama
- 2003–2006: Pallacanestro Varese
- 2006–2007: Menorca Bàsquet
- 2007–2011: Basket Club Ferrara
- 2011–2012: Club La Unión
- 2012–2014: Sport Club Cañadense

Career highlights
- FIBA South American League MVP (2001); Argentine League MVP (2002)
Medals
Men's basketball
Representing Argentina
FIBA AmeriCup
Gold medal – first place	2005 Santo Domingo
FIBA South American Championship
Gold medal – first place	2001 Valdivia
Gold medal – first place	2004 Rio de Janeiro
Goodwill Games
Silver medal – second place	2001 Brisbane

Daniel "Dani" Edgardo Farabello (born 18 October 1973) is a former Argentine-Italian professional basketball player.

== Professional career ==
Farabello played with Club de Regatas Vasco da Gama.

== National team career ==
A member of the senior men's Argentine national basketball team, he competed with the squad at the 1996 Summer Olympics and 2006 FIBA World Championship.

== Personal life ==
His son Francisco plays college basketball for the Creighton Bluejays men's basketball team.
