= Rick Apodaca =

Puerto Rican basketball player (born 1980)

Personal information
- Born: July 1, 1980 (age 46) North Bergen, New Jersey
- Listed height: 6 ft 3 in (1.91 m)
- Listed weight: 190 lb (86 kg)

Career information
- High school: North Bergen (North Bergen, New Jersey)
- College: Hofstra (1999–2003)
- NBA draft: 2003: undrafted
- Playing career: 2000–2015
- Position: Shooting guard / small forward

Career history
- 2000: Bayamón Cowboys
- 2002: Arecibo Captains
- 2003: Westchester Wildfire
- 2003: Arecibo Captains
- 2003–2004: Huntsville Flight
- 2004: Arecibo Captains
- 2005: San German Athletics
- 2005–2006: Polpak Swiecie
- 2006: San German Athletics
- 2006–2007: Scafati Basket
- 2007–2008: Beşiktaş Cola Turka
- 2008: Santurce Crabbers
- 2008: Yunnan
- 2008: Basket Club Ferrara
- 2013: Leones de Ponce
- 2014: Caciques de Humacao
- 2014: Indios de Mayagüez
- 2015: Mets de Guaynabo

Career highlights
- BSN Rookie if the Year (2000); LBA Top Scorer (2007); LBA steals leader (2007)
Medals
Men's basketball
Representing Puerto Rico
FIBA AmeriCup
Bronze medal – third place	2003 Puerto Rico
Bronze medal – third place	2007 United States
Centrobasket
Gold medal – first place	2003 Mexico
Silver medal – second place	2004 Dominican Republic
Bronze medal – third place	2006 Panama

Rick Apodaca (born July 1, 1980) is a Puerto Rican former professional basketball player. Apodaca has played in the NCAA, USBL, NBDL, and the National Superior Basketball League of Puerto Rico (BSN) with the Arecibo Captains, Bayamón Cowboys, San German Athletics and Leones de Ponce. He also played professional basketball in Poland, Italy and Turkey. Apodaca was a member of the senior Puerto Rican National Basketball Team that defeated the United States at the 2004 Summer Olympic Games.

== High school ==
Apodaca, is a native of North Bergen, New Jersey, where he attended North Bergen High School. Apodaca was the all-time leader in points scored in Hudson County high school basketball history, surpassing a thirty-five plus year record held by current Fox college basketball analyst Bill Raftery, in 1999. He was also inducted into the Hudson County Sports Hall of Fame.

== College career ==
Apodaca debuted in the National Collegiate Athletic Association as a member of Hofstra's basketball team in 1999, and he was an All-America East Rookie selection. He led the team in scoring during his junior year with an average of 17.7 points per game, and was an All Colonial Athletic Association second team selection. During his senior season, Apodaca was selected to the All Colonial Athletic Association first team during the tournament's preseason, but was unable to play during the first fourteen games of the 2005 season.

== Professional career ==
In the 2005 off-season, the Arecibo Captains traded Apodaca to the San Germán Athletics for Larry Ayuso. He also played with the Huntsville Flight in the NBDL. Apodaca was a part of Polpak Swiecie, in the 2005–06 season of the Polish League. During the 2006–07 season, Apodaca played with Scafati Basket, in the LBA, in Italy. During that time, he was selected to play in the league's All-Star Game, and he finished fourth in the league in scoring, with an average of 19.7 points per game.

Apodaca also played with the Turkish club Beşiktaş Cola Turka, in that country's national league championship, and in the EuroCup. He played with the Santurce Crabbers, in the semifinals of the 2008 National Superior Basketball season.

== National team career ==
Apodaca was a member of the senior Puerto Rican National Basketball Team starting in 2002. He played at the 2002 FIBA World Championship, in Indianapolis in, and at the 2003 Pan American Games, in which Puerto Rico won the bronze medal. He also played at the 2004 Summer Olympics, and in a game where Puerto Rico defeated the United States. During that game, he suffered an injury that left him unable to compete in the rest of the tournament. Apodaca also competed with Puerto Rico at the 2006 FIBA World Championship, in Japan.

In June 2008, the national team's management announced that Apodaca did not have a guaranteed spot on the roster. After that, Apodaca notified them on June 15, 2008, that he needed time to attend to some personal issues, and to take time off to ponder about his national team future.

== Career highlights ==
=== Pro clubs ===
- Puerto Rican League Rookie of the Year: (2000)
- Italian League All-Star Game: (2006)
- Italian League Top Scorer: (2007)

=== Puerto Rican senior national team ===
- 2003 Pan American Games: Bronze
- 2003 FIBA Americas Championship: Bronze
- 2007 FIBA Americas Championship: Bronze

== Career stats ==
Apodaca's NBA Development League stats, in 25 games played, were: 7 games started, 267 points scored (10.7 points per game), 42 assists (1.7 assists per game), 37 rebounds (1.5 rebounds per game), 19 steals (0.7 steals per game), 5 blocks (0.1 blocks per game), a .412% field goal percentage, a .390% three-point percentage, and an .849% free-throw percentage.
