= Víctor Ávila =

Mexican basketball player (born 1977)

Personal information
- Born: March 23, 1977 (age 49) Culiacán, Mexico
- Listed height: 6 ft 11 in (2.11 m)

Career information
- High school: Cornerstone Christian (San Antonio, Texas)
- College: Scottsdale CC (1996–1998); Oklahoma (1998–2000)
- NBA draft: 2000: undrafted
- Playing career: 2001–2014
- Position: Center

Career history
- 2001: San Diego Wildfire
- 2001: Salamanca FC
- 2001–2002: North Charleston Lowgators
- 2002: Soles de Jalisco
- 2002–2004: Caballeros de Culiacán
- 2003: Mineros de Zacatecas
- 2003: Tijuana Tazmania Diablos
- 2004–2005: BK Synthesia Pardubice
- 2005: Cañeros de Navolato
- 2006: Tiburones de Mazatlán
- 2008: Atleticos de San German
- 2004–2010: Halcones UV Xalapa
- 2009–2012: Caballeros de Culiacán
- 2012: Tijuana Zonkeys
- 2012–2013: Halcones UV Xalapa
- 2013: Ostioneros de Guaymas
- 2013–2014: Ángeles Guerreros de Acapulco
- 2014: Tijuana Zonkeys

Víctor Manuel Ávila Haro (born 23 March 1977) is a Mexican professional basketball player currently with the CIBACOPA team Caballeros de Culiacán. Since the CIBACOPA takes place for only a few months a year, Avila also plays for Halcones UV Xalapa in the LNBP. Throughout his career, Avila has played professional basketball in the United States, Mexico, Czech Republic and Puerto Rico. He has represented Mexico's national basketball team on many occasions.

== Achievements ==
=== Individual ===
- 1999, 2003–07, 2009: Mexico national basketball team
- 2008: LNBP MVP
- 2006, 2007, 2009: CIBACOPA All-Star
- 2004, 2005, 2009: Mexico LNBP All-Star
- 1998: 2nd Team JUCO All-American
- 1997: JUCO Conference Freshman of the Year

=== Team ===
- 2010, 2014: CIBACOPA Champion
- 2009: CIBACOPA Southern Division Champion
- 2008-2010: LNBP Champion
- 2007: FIBA COCABA Championship Gold Medal
- 2003: Centrobasket Bronze Medal
