= Denham Brown =

Canadian basketball player (born 1983)

Personal information
- Born: January 6, 1983 (age 43) Toronto, Ontario, Canada
- Listed height: 6 ft 6 in (1.98 m)
- Listed weight: 220 lb (100 kg)

Career information
- High school: West Hill Collegiate Institute (Toronto, Ontario)
- College: UConn (2002–2006)
- NBA draft: 2006: 2nd round, 40th overall pick
- Drafted by: Seattle SuperSonics
- Playing career: 2006–2015
- Position: Shooting guard / small forward

Career history
- 2006–2007: Tulsa 66ers
- 2007: Galatasaray Café Crown
- 2007: Tisettanta Cantù
- 2008–2009: Dakota Wizards
- 2009: Iowa Energy
- 2010: Marinos de Anzoátegui
- 2010: Barangay Ginebra Kings
- 2010–2011: Dnipro Dnipropetrovsk
- 2011: Oshawa Power
- 2011–2012: Ciclista Olímpico
- 2012–2013: Timba Timişoara
- 2013–2014: BC Mures

Career highlights
- NCAA champion (2004)
- Stats at Basketball Reference

Denham Washington Brown (born January 6, 1983) is a Canadian former professional basketball player.

== High school ==
Brown attended Bathurst Heights Secondary School in Toronto, and led the school's AAA basketball team to the Ontario provincial championship in 2000. In his junior year, he averaged 30 points per game (ppg). However, he transferred to West Hill Collegiate Institute for his senior season after Bathurst Heights closed. In 2002, his senior year, Brown was highly celebrated in the media when he scored 111 points in a basketball game against R. H. King Academy. After Brown scored 111 points in a game he was featured in SLAM magazine; not only because of the 111 points, but also because he had committed to an elite college program at the University of Connecticut (UConn).

== College ==
Brown was a sophomore at UConn when the Huskies won the 2004 national championship. In his senior year at UConn (2005–06 season), he averaged 10.7 points, 1.3 assists, and 4.4 rebounds per game. In November the Huskies beat Gonzaga to win the Maui Invitational on a last-second jumper by Brown. His season-high came during a game against Villanova in which he scored 23 points. In the regional finals of the 2006 NCAA tournament, Brown made a last-second lay-up to force overtime against George Mason, but missed a potential game-winning three pointer at the buzzer resulting in an 86–84 loss. During his tenure with the Huskies, Brown had a reputation for being a clutch performer, as well as possessing an above average handle for a wing player.

== NBA ==
Brown was selected with the 40th pick in the 2nd round in the 2006 NBA draft by the Seattle SuperSonics. After playing two preseason games with totals of eight points and five rebounds with the Sonics, he was waived by the team on October 26, 2006. However, the Tulsa 66ers subsequently used the eighth overall pick in the 2006 NBA D-League Draft on Brown.

In his first preseason game with the SuperSonics, Brown scored 8 points in a winning effort against the Portland Trail Blazers. After that game Brown saw little action for the SuperSonics in the preseason appearing in just one more game. He was playing well in the D-League averaging close to 19 ppg for the Tulsa 66ers.

On November 7, 2008, Brown was selected with the 9th pick in the first round of the 2008 NBA D-League Draft by the Utah Flash. He began the 2008–09 season with the Dakota Wizards.

On December 19, 2008, Brown was waived by the Wizards due to injury.

On March 4, 2009, Brown signed with the D-League's Iowa Energy.

== Overseas ==
Brown left the Tulsa 66ers later in the 2006–07 season, and played in a pro league in Turkey for Galatasaray Café Crown. For the 2007–08 season, he signed with the Serie A Italian team Tisettanta Cantù.

Brown took his talents to Philippines for three weeks in June 2010, as one of a series of import players for the Philippine Basketball Association's Barangay Ginebra Kings.

On August 25, 2010, Polish league champion for two straight years, Asseco Prokom Gdynia, added Brown to their roster.

== National team ==
Brown has extensive experience playing on the Canadian national team. He first made the team in 2003 when he was on the roster for the FIBA Americas Qualification Tournament. At the FIBA Tournament he played in ten games, starting none of them; but he averaged 12.4 ppg, 4.2 rebounds per game (rpg), 1.0 assist per game (apg) and 20 minutes per game (mpg). In 2004, he was on the roster for the Four Nations Tournament. At that tournament, he upped his scoring average to 13.8 ppg, while starting all six games and averaging 23.3 mpg, 5.3 rpg, and 1.3 apg. He also played with the team in 2005, but did not play in 2006, as he was attempting to play in NBA. Brown played for the team during the 2007 FIBA Americas Championship.

== NBL Canada ==
On October 11, 2011, it was announced that Brown had signed a deal with the National Basketball League of Canada's Oshawa Power.

== Honours ==
- 2004 NCAA Champion

== See also ==
- List of basketball players who have scored 100 points in a single game
