= Manuel Narvaez =

Puerto Rican basketball player

Personal information
- Born: December 18, 1981 (age 44) Bayamón, Puerto Rico
- Listed height: 6 ft 10 in (2.08 m)
- Listed weight: 260 lb (120 kg)

Career information
- College: Southern Nazarene (2000–2004)
- NBA draft: 2004: undrafted
- Playing career: 2000–2015
- Position: Center
Medals
Men's basketball
Representing Puerto Rico
Pan American Games
Silver medal – second place	2007 Brazil
Gold medal – first place	2011 Mexico
Centrobasket
Bronze medal – third place	2006 Panama
Central American and Caribbean Games
Gold medal – first place	2010 Puerto Rico

Manuel Antonio Narváez Rivera (born December 18, 1981) is a Puerto Rican professional basketball player. He has played in the NBDL, National Association of Intercollegiate Athletics (NAIA) and the National Superior Basketball League of Puerto Rico (BSN) with Santurce Crabbers, Coamo Marathon Runners, Ponce Lions, Bayamón Cowboys, Morovis Titans, and the Isabela Gallitos. Narvaez was drafted by the Albuquerque Thunderbirds with the 1st pick of the fourth round of the 2006 NBDL draft. He was a member of the 2006 and 2007 Puerto Rican National Team.

== Biography ==
Narvaez played his college career with Southern Nazarene University from 2000 to 2004. During his junior year (2002–03)he averaged 15.8 points per game and 11.6 rebounds per game. During his senior year (2003–2004) he averaged 18.6 points per game and 12.5 rebounds per game, and was named NAIA Third Team All-American.

Narvaez played professionally in the National Superior Basketball League starting in 2000. In 2006 Narvaez was drafted by the Albuquerque Thunderbirds with the 1st pick of the fourth round of the 2006 NBA Development League draft. On January 2, 2007, Narvaez was waived by the Thunderbirds. On February 14, 2007, Narvaez was acquired by the Colorado 14ers to replace Eric Osmundson due to injury. Narvaez was waived by the 14ers in February 2007.

With the Coamo Marathon Runners in 2007, Narvaez averaged 14 points and 13.9 rebounds per game. He led his team in five categories: defensive rebound, offensive rebounds, All-start team, sportsmanship player and defensive team.

Narvaez was a member of the Puerto Rican National Basketball Team in 2006, participating in the Central American and Caribbean Games earning the gold medal and the Basketball World Championship 2006.

During summer of 2007, Narvaez represented Puerto Rico as a member of the Puerto Rican National Basketball Team, which won a silver medal during the 2007 Pan-American Games.

Narvaez participated in the 2010 National Superior Basketball season, playing with Ponce Lions with an average of 10 points and 10 rebounds per game. In the 2011 season with Coamo, Narvaez averaged 11 points and 11 rebounds.

Narvaez is also an author of a motivational book called "El Sentido del Baloncesto en la Vida". In this book, Narvaez described leadership tools basketball offers to the future generations.

== Career stats ==
Narvaez's NBA Development League stats in 16 games were 7 games started, 61 points with 3.9 points per game, 8 assists for 0.4 assists per game average, 72 rebounds for a 4.9 rebounds per game average, 4 steals with a 0.3 steals per game average, 1 block for a 0.1 blocks per game average, a .500 field goal percentage and a .765 free-throw percentage.
