= Héctor Romero =

Venezuelan basketball player

No. 33 – Centauros de Portuguesa
- Position: Power forward
- League: SLB

Personal information
- Born: January 3, 1980 (age 46) Barcelona, Anzoátegui
- Listed height: 6 ft 8 in (2.03 m)
- Listed weight: 220 lb (100 kg)

Career information
- College: Independence CC (1999–2001); New Orleans (2001–2003)
- NBA draft: 2003: undrafted
- Playing career: 2000–present

Career history
- 2006–2007: AEL 1964 Larissa
- 2007: Polaris World Murcia
- 2007: Legea Scafati
- 2007–2008: Montepaschi Siena

Career highlights
- FIBA Americas League Top Scorer (2009); Sun Belt Player of the Year (2002); 2× First-team All-Sun Belt (2002, 2003)
Medals
Men's basketball
Representing Venezuela
FIBA AmeriCup
Bronze medal – third place	2005 Santo Domingo

Héctor Orlando Romero Rivas (born January 3, 1980) is a Venezuelan former professional basketball player.

== Professional career ==
- 2000–2002: Basket Bravos de Portuguesa
- 2002–2004: Basket Marinos de Oriente
- 2004-2005: Haifa-Ramat Hasharon
- 2005: Basket Marinos de Anzoategui
- 2005-2006: Haifa-Ramat Hasharon
- 2006: Basket Marinos de Anzoategui
- 2006: Basket Murcia
- 2007: Basket AE Larissa
- 2007: Basket Scafati
- 2008: Basket Siena
- 2008–2009: Basket Udine
- 2009: Basket Marinos de Anzoategui
- 2009–2010: Basket Espartanos de Margarita
- 2011: Basket Indios de Mayaguez
- 2012–2013: Basket Trotamundos de Carabobo
- 2014–2016: Basket Bucaneros de La Guaira
- 2017: Basket Marinos de Anzoategui
- 2020: Basket Centauros de Portuguesa

== National team career ==
Romero was also a member of the senior men's Venezuelan national basketball team, and he played at the 2002 FIBA World Championship.
