= Juan Mendez (basketball) =

Canadian basketball player

Personal information
- Born: September 23, 1981 (age 45) Montreal, Quebec, Canada
- Listed height: 6 ft 8 in (2.03 m)
- Listed weight: 250 lb (113 kg)

Career information
- High school: Florida Air Academy (Melbourne, Florida)
- College: Niagara (2001–2005)
- NBA draft: 2005: undrafted
- Playing career: 2005–2013
- Position: Power forward
- Number: 13
- Coaching career: 2015–present

Career history
- 2005–2006: Pallacanestro Trapani
- 2006: Panellinios
- 2006–2007: Ironi Nahariya
- 2007–2008: Maccabi Rishon LeZion
- 2008–2009: Xinjiang Flying Tigers
- 2010–2011: BC Dnipro
- 2011–2012: Cocolos
- 2012–2013: Montreal Jazz
- 2013: GUG

Career highlights
- MAAC Player of the Year (2005)

Juan Méndez (born September 23, 1981) is a Canadian professional basketball player who played for the Niagara University men's university basketball team from 2001 to 2005. He is currently assistant coach on the Redmen Basketball Team. Born in Montreal, Quebec, from Dominican parents, Mendez played with the Canadian national basketball team as well as in several different professional teams overseas.

== Career highs ==
Juan entered his senior year with over 1,500 career points. This put him close to Calvin Murphy on Niagara's all time lists. Juan is also the highest scoring Canadian in NCAA Division 1 history. In 2014, Juan was inducted into the MAAC Naismith Hall of Fame (1st Canadian) in Springfield, Massachusetts, USA.

== Professional career ==
After graduating college, Mendez built his professional career as a player overseas. He has also been a member of the Team Canada from summers 2003 to 2008. During his time with the team, he participated in the NBA summer league in 2003, averaging 11.4 PPG in 5 games. He participated in the 2003 Pan American Games and finished in 2nd place at Four Nations Tournament in China and Brazil in 2004. He also averaged 16.5 points and 8.5 rebounds per game at the 2005 Americas Championship and 8.9 points and 4.1 rebounds per game during the 2007 Americas Championship.

== See also ==
- List of NCAA Division I men's basketball players with 2000 points and 1000 rebounds
