= Elías Larry Ayuso =

Puerto Rican basketball player

Larry Ayuso
Vaqueros de Bayamón
- Position: Assistant coach
- League: BSN

Personal information
- Born: Elías Ayuso Carrillo; March 27, 1977 (age 49) Carolina, Puerto Rico
- Listed height: 6 ft 2 in (1.88 m)
- Listed weight: 200 lb (91 kg)

Career information
- College: USC (1998–1999)
- Playing career: 1996–2020

Career history
- 1996–1997: Piratas de Quebradillas
- 1999: Piratas de Quebradillas
- 2000–2001: Atléticos de San Germán
- 2001–2002: Sutor Montegranaro
- 2002: Atléticos de San Germán
- 2002–2003: Grand Rapids Hoops
- 2003: Ionikos Neas Filadelfeias
- 2003: Atléticos de San Germán
- 2003–2004: Beşiktaş
- 2005: Capitanes de Arecibo
- 2005–2006: Žalgiris Kaunas
- 2006: Capitanes de Arecibo
- 2006–2007: KK Split
- 2007: Cangrejeros de Santurce
- 2007–2008: Cibona Zagreb
- 2008: Cangrejeros de Santurce
- 2008–2009: Iowa Energy
- 2009: Cangrejeros de Santurce
- 2010–2012: Capitanes de Arecibo
- 2012: Huracanes del Atlántico
- 2013–2014: Mets de Guaynabo
- 2014: Vaqueros de Bayamón
- 2015: Mets de Guaynabo
- 2015–2016: Piratas de Quebradillas
- 2016–2017: Cangrejeros de Santurce
- 2017: Brujos de Guayama
- 2017–2018: Cariduros de Fajardo
- 2019-2020: Atléticos de San Germán

Career highlights
- 4× BSN champion (2005, 2007, 2010, 2011); 2× BSN Finals MVP (2007, 2010); BSN Most Outstanding Player (2005); BSN scoring champion (2002); 4× BSN All-Star (2006–2008, 2010); 3× BSN First team (2005, 2010, 2012); 9× BSN three pointers leader (2003, 2005–2011, 2015); Greek League All-Star (2003); CBA All-Star (2003)
Medals
Men's basketball
Representing Puerto Rico
FIBA AmeriCup
Silver medal – second place	2009 Puerto Rico
Silver medal – second place	2013 Venezuela
Bronze medal – third place	2003 Puerto Rico
Bronze medal – third place	2007 United States
Centrobasket
Gold medal – first place	2003 Mexico
Gold medal – first place	2008 Mexico
Silver medal – second place	2004 Dominican Republic
Bronze medal – third place	2006 Panama
Central American and Caribbean Games
Bronze medal – third place	2014 Mexico
FIBA CBC Championship
Gold medal – first place	2007 Puerto Rico
Pan American Games
Bronze medal – third place	2003 Dominican Republic

Elías "Larry" Ayuso Carrillo (Note: In this Spanish name, the first or paternal surname is Ayuso and the second or maternal family name is Carrillo.) (born March 27, 1977) is a Puerto Rican former professional basketball player, who is head coach for the Piratas de Quebradillas of the Baloncesto Superior Nacional (BSN). Internationally, Ayuso has represented and played for the Puerto Rican national team since 2001. He was part of the 2004 team that defeated the United States at the 2004 Olympic Games.

== Professional career ==
Ayuso has spent most of his career playing in Puerto Rico. He also has played in Europe with Montegranaro in Italy, Ionikos Neas Filadelfeias BC in Greece, Beşiktaş in Turkey, Spartak St. Petersburg in Russia, the Žalgiris Kaunas in Lithuania, and the KK Split and KK Cibona Zagreb in Croatia.

Ayuso participated in the 2003 pre-season training camp of the San Antonio Spurs and the 2006 pre-season training camp with the Denver Nuggets of the NBA.

Ayuso led the BSN in 2002 scoring 703 points and achieving a 24.2 PPG average.

During the summer of 2004, Ayuso was a member of the Puerto Rico National Team that participated in the 2004 Olympics which defeated the United States.

In 2005, Ayuso helped the Captains win their first title since 1959 when Arecibo beat the Bayamón Cowboys in four games during the BSN finals.

During the summer of 2006, Ayuso was a member of the Puerto Rico National Team that participated in the 2006 FIBA World Championship. Ayuso scored 106 points with a 21.2 PPG and shot a .629 3-point percentage during the tournament. Ayuso finished tied for fourth in PPG in the 2006 Worlds. Due to his outstanding performance during the 2006 Worlds the Denver Nuggets invited him to the 2006 Training Camp and was added to the Pre-Season roster.

In February 2007, Ayuso signed with the KK Split of the Croatian A1 League.

During the summer of 2007, he joined the BSN Santurce Crabbers before joining the Puerto Rico National Team. During his tenure with the Santurce Crabbers he led the team to win the BSN Championship over the Arecibo Captains. He was elected the 2007 BSN Finals MVP.

On November 7, 2008, Ayuso was drafted with the 2nd pick in the 2nd round (18th overall pick) of the 2008 NBA Development League draft by the Iowa Energy.

On July 3, 2010, Ayuso led the Arecibo Captains to the 2010 BSN Championship, beating the Vaqueros de Bayamón in seven games.

== Coaching ==
Ayuso was slated to coach Santurce for the 2022 season in the BSN, but opted to ask for his release to pursue other options. He signed with Quebradillas in March.

He became the head coach of the Capitanes de Arecibo on October 1, 2026.

== Personal life ==
Ayuso is a graduate of the University of Southern California with a bachelor's degree in Social Sciences. He is married with Puerto Rican model and host Angelique Burgos better known as "La Burbu" with whom he has two sons named Sahil Elías Ayuso and Kokoh Mar Ayuso.

== Career statistics ==
Legend
GP	Games played	GS	Games started	MPG	Minutes per game
FG%	Field goal percentage	3P%	3-point field goal percentage	FT%	Free throw percentage
RPG	Rebounds per game	APG	Assists per game	SPG	Steals per game
BPG	Blocks per game	PPG	Points per game	**Bold**	Career high

=== NBA D-League ===
Year	Team	GP	GS	MPG	FG%	3P%	FT%	RPG	APG	SPG	BPG	PPG
2008–09	Iowa	14	14	35.0	.383	.321	.895	2.8	1.9	0.6	0.1	13.2
Career		14	14	35.0	.383	.321	.895	2.8	1.9	0.6	0.1	13.2

=== BSN ===
Year	Team	GP	FG%	3P%	FT%	RPG	APG	PPG
1996	Quebradillas	27	.363	.322	.869	1.4	0.6	8.6
1997	Quebradillas	17	.344	.327	.794	1.9	0.4	6.4
1999	Quebradillas	28	.444	.352	.818	1.7	1.0	10.3
2000	San Germán	28	.461	.402	.826	3.0	1.7	16.3
2001	San Germán	26	**.495**	**.455**	.881	4.4	1.8	22.3
2002	San Germán	29	.451	.426	.864	3.4	1.9	24.2
2003	San Germán	4	.362	.270	**.947**	**4.5**	**3.8**	19.5
2005	Arecibo	31	.423	.392	.880	3.5	2.7	23.9
2006	Arecibo	26	.400	.379	.807	3.1	2.6	19.9
2007	Santurce	7	.458	**.455**	.908	2.4	3.0	**24.6**
2008	Santurce	30	.442	.393	.859	1.9	1.9	19.7
2009	Santurce	30	.470	.420	.880	2.9	1.5	21.9
2010	Arecibo	29	.406	.351	.902	2.9	2.0	18.2
2011	Arecibo	22	.384	.382	.896	2.3	0.9	19.0
2012	Arecibo	27	.390	.352	.939	2.7	1.3	18.0
2013	Guaynabo	36	.376	.348	.913	2.8	2.2	19.9
2014	Bayamon	36	.362	.334	.905	2.5	1.8	16.9
2015	Guaynabo	**44**	.416	.365	.872	2.2	2.0	18.8
Career	N/A	477	.418	.380	.876	2.7	1.7	18.2

=== EuroLeague ===
Year	Team	GP	GS	MPG	FG%	3P%	FT%	RPG	APG	SPG	BPG	PPG	PIR
2005–06	Žalgiris	8	8	24.2	.355	.372	.632	1.8	1.1	1.1	.0	10.3	7.0
2007–08	Cibona Zagreb	13	12	29.2	.476	.296	.921	2.5	1.5	1.0	.0	12.8	8.7

== See also ==
- List of Puerto Ricans – Sports
