= Scafati Basket =

Longobardi Scafati Basket
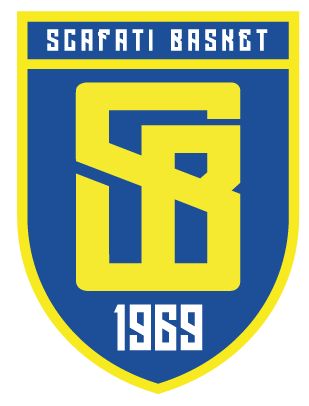
- Leagues: LBA
- Founded: 1969; 57 years ago
- Arena: PalaMangano
- Capacity: 3,700
- Location: Scafati, Italy
- Team colors: Blue, Yellow
- Main sponsor: Givova
- President: Alessandro Rossano
- Head coach: Piero Bucchi
- Ownership: Aniello Longobardi
- Championships: 1 Serie A2; 1 Italian LNP Cup; 1 LegaDue Cup; 1 Italian LNP Supercup
- Website: www.scafatibasket.com
Home	Away

Scafati Basket, known for sponsorship reasons as Longobardi Scafati Basket, is an Italian professional basketball club based in Scafati, Campania. The club competes in Lega Basket Serie A (LBA), the first-tier of the Italian league pyramid .

== History ==
Scafati Basket traces its history to Silvio Pellico, a club founded by a group of students in 1949. That merged with Savoia in 1955 to form Scafatese Basket, which would be renamed Centro Sportivo Scafatese in 1969. The team played in the amateur regional Serie C and Serie D until the early 1990s when, under the presidency of Aniello Longobardi, it climbed up divisions to reach the first tier Serie A in 2006.

It was relegated from the Serie A in 2007–08.

== Arena ==
The team has played its home games in the PalaMangano (named after former head coach Massimo Mangano), it holds 3,700 seats.

== Sponsorship names ==
Throughout the years, due to sponsorship, the club has been known as:

- Rida Scafati (2001–2003)
- Eurorida Scafati (2003–2006)
- Legea Scafati (2006–2008)
- Harem Scafati (2008–2009)
- Bialetti Scafati (2009–2010)
- Sunrise Scafati (2010–2011)
- Givova Scafati (2011–2026)
- Longobardi Scafati (2026–present)

== Players ==
=== Current roster ===
Givova Scafati roster
Players
Coaches

Pos.	No.	Nat.	Name	Ht.	Wt.	Age
G	00	(France)	Ngouama, Mehdy	1.88 m (6 ft 2 in)	79 kg (174 lb)	31 – 6 July 1995
F/C	4	(Italy)	Lever, Alessandro	2.08 m (6 ft 10 in)	107 kg (236 lb)	27 – 4 December 1998
C	7	(Italy)	Iannuzzi, Antonio	2.03 m (6 ft 8 in)	103 kg (227 lb)	35 – 21 April 1991
G	8	(United States)	Moore, Charlie	1.80 m (5 ft 11 in)	82 kg (181 lb)	28 – 3 February 1998
F	9	(Italy)	Spinelli, Francesco	1.96 m (6 ft 5 in)		21 – 29 September 2005
G	11	(Italy)	Ceron, Marco	1.96 m (6 ft 5 in)	82 kg (181 lb)	34 – 16 June 1992
G	12	(United States)	Nevels, Garrett	1.88 m (6 ft 2 in)	86 kg (190 lb)	33 – 26 November 1992
F	13	(United States)	Offurum, Mezie	2.03 m (6 ft 8 in)	104 kg (229 lb)	26 – 21 May 2000
G	17	(United States)	McGruder, Rodney	1.93 m (6 ft 4 in)	93 kg (205 lb)	35 – 21 May 1991
C	21	(United States)	Onyema, Ze'Rik	2.06 m (6 ft 9 in)	107 kg (236 lb)	25 – 31 October 2001
G	33	(Italy)	Mascolo, Bruno	1.90 m (6 ft 3 in)	85 kg (187 lb)	30 – 4 March 1996
F/C	88	(United States)	Johnson, Brandon	2.03 m (6 ft 8 in)	95 kg (209 lb)	24 – 15 January 2002

Head coach

- (Italy) Piero Bucchi

Assistant coach(es)

- (Italy) Mario Conte
- (Italy) Antonio Carone

Legend

- (C) Team captain
- Injured

- Roster
Updated: November 22, 2026

== Notable players ==
Note: Flags indicate national team eligibility at FIBA-sanctioned events. Players may hold other non-FIBA nationalities not displayed.

Criteria

To appear in this section a player must have either:

- Set a club record or won an individual award while at the club
- Played at least one official international match for their national team at any time
- Played at least one official NBA match at any time.

- (Canada) Greg Newton 2 seasons: '00–'02
- (United States) Randolph Childress 2 seasons: '01–'03
- (United States) Michael Campbell 1 season: '01–'02
- (United States) Curtis Staples 1 season: '01–'02
- (United States) Lamont Barnes 1 season: '02–'03
- (Australia) Jason Smith 1 season: '02–'03
- (Argentina) Maximiliano Stanic 3 seasons: '03–'06
- (United States) James Collins 1 season: '03–'04
- (Italy) Vincenzo Esposito 1 season: '03–'04
- (United States) Josh Powell 1 season: '03–'04
- (United States) Darryl Wilson 2 seasons: '04–'06
- (United States) Harold Jamison 2 seasons: '04–'06
- (United States) Jamal Robinson 1 season: '04–'05
- (Puerto Rico) Rick Apodaca 1 season: '06–'07
- (Venezuela) Hector Romero 1 season: '07–'08
- (Denmark) Michael Andersen 1 season: '07–'08
- (United States) Marcus Hatten 1 season: '07–'08
- (Belgium) Dimitri Lauwers 3 seasons: '05–'08
- (Italy) Luigi Datome 2 seasons: '06–'08
- (United States) Frankie Williams 1 season: '07–'08
- (Argentina) Rubén Wolkowyski 1 season: '07–'08
- (Lithuania) Steponas Babrauskas 1 season: '07–'08
- (United Kingdom) Mike Lenzly 1 season: '08–'09
- (United States) Anthony Carter 1 season: '06–'07
- (Finland) Edon Maxhuni
- (Finland) Kimmo Muurinen 1 season: '10
- (Albania) Franko Bushati 1 season: '12–'13
- (Israel) Yuval Naimi 1 season: '16–'17
- (United States) Jordan McRae 1 season: '24
