= 2009 FIBA Americas Championship squads =

These were the rosters of the 10 teams competing at the 2009 FIBA Americas Championship.

== Group A ==
=== Canada ===
Canada men's national basketball team roster
Players
Coaches

Pos.	No.	Name	Age – Date of birth	Height	Club	Ctr.
G	4	Jermaine Anderson	26 – February 8, 1983	6 ft 2 in (1.88 m)	Tübingen	(Germany)
G	5	Tyler Kepkay	22 – June 19, 1987	5 ft 10 in (1.78 m)	University of Utah	(United States)
G	6	Ryan Bell	25 – April 17, 1984	6 ft 5 in (1.96 m)	Schalke	(Germany)
F	7	Jermaine Bucknor	25 – November 1, 1983	6 ft 7 in (2.01 m)	Aix Maurienne Savoie Basket	(France)
G	8	Carl English	28 – February 2, 1981	6 ft 5 in (1.96 m)	Gran Canaria	(Spain)
F	9	Olu Famutimi	25 – February 21, 1984	6 ft 6 in (1.98 m)	Khimik Yuzhny	(Ukraine)
G	10	Andy Rautins	22 – November 2, 1986	6 ft 5 in (1.96 m)	Syracuse University	(United States)
F	11	Aaron Doornekamp	23 – December 5, 1985	6 ft 7 in (2.01 m)	Carleton University	(Canada)
F	12	Jesse Young	29 – April 29, 1980	6 ft 10 in (2.08 m)	Murcia	(Spain)
F	13	Kyle Landry	23 – April 4, 1986	6 ft 9 in (2.06 m)	Mons-Hainaut	(Belgium)
F	14	Levon Kendall	24 – July 4, 1984	6 ft 10 in (2.08 m)	Panionios	(Greece)
C	15	Joel Anthony	26 – August 9, 1982	6 ft 9 in (2.06 m)	Miami Heat	(United States)

Head coach

- (Canada) Leo Rautins

Legend

- nat field describes country
  of last club
  before the tournament
- Age field is age on August 26, 2009

Average Age
24.8

=== Mexico ===
Mexico men's national basketball team roster
Players
Coaches

Pos.	No.	Name	Age – Date of birth	Height	Club	Ctr.
G	4	Karim Malpica	31 – August 24, 1978	6 ft 3 in (1.91 m)	Soles de Mexicali	(Mexico)
F	5	Jesus Lopez	25 – December 28, 1983	6 ft 8 in (2.03 m)	Caballeros de Culiacán	(Mexico)
G	6	Anthony Pedroza	30 – March 7, 1979	6 ft 3 in (1.91 m)	Rayos de Hermosillo	(Mexico)
C	7	Horacio Llamas	36 – July 17, 1973	6 ft 11 in (2.11 m)	Trigueros de Ciudad Obregon	(Mexico)
C	8	Adam Parada	27 – October 21, 1981	7 ft 0 in (2.13 m)	Los Angeles Lightning	(United States)
G	9	Romel Beck	27 – May 29, 1982	6 ft 7 in (2.01 m)	Dakota Wizards	(United States)
G/F	10	Miguel Ayala	26 – September 29, 1982	6 ft 6 in (1.98 m)	Coras de Nayarit	(Mexico)
G	11	Omar Quintero	27 – September 26, 1981	6 ft 0 in (1.83 m)	Gigantes de Guayana	(Venezuela)
F	12	Noé Alonzo	25 – December 28, 1983	6 ft 7 in (2.01 m)	Tecos UAG	(Mexico)
G	13	Enrique Zuniga	33 – July 7, 1976	6 ft 4 in (1.93 m)	Frayles de Guasave	(Mexico)
F/C	14	Gustavo Ayon	23 – April 1, 1985	6 ft 10 in (2.08 m)	Fuenlabrada	(Spain)
C	15	Lorenzo Mata	22 – February 27, 1986	6 ft 9 in (2.06 m)	Halcones UV Xalapa	(Mexico)

Head coach

- (Mexico) Arturo Guerrero

Legend

- nat field describes country
  of last club
  before the tournament
- Age field is age on August 26, 2009

=== Puerto Rico ===
Puerto Rico men's national basketball team roster
Players
Coaches

Pos.	No.	Name	Age – Date of birth	Height	Club	Ctr.
C	4	Manuel Narvaez	24 – May 23, 1985	6 ft 10 in (2.08 m)	Ponce Lions (basketball)	(Puerto Rico)
G	5	Jose Juan Barea	24 – March 4, 1985	6 ft 0 in (1.83 m)	Dallas Mavericks	(United States)
G	6	Filiberto Rivera	26 – September 28, 1982	6 ft 2 in (1.88 m)	Bamberg	(Germany)
G	7	Carlos Arroyo	30 – July 30, 1979	6 ft 2 in (1.88 m)	Miami Heat	(United States)
F	8	Angel Vassalo	23 – April 2, 1986	6 ft 6 in (1.98 m)	Gallitos de Isabela	(Puerto Rico)
G	9	Christian Dalmau	33 – August 29, 1975	6 ft 4 in (1.93 m)	Ural Great	(Russia)
G	10	David Cortez	32 – March 27, 1977	6 ft 3 in (1.91 m)	Capitanes de Arecibo	(Puerto Rico)
F	11	Ricardo Sanchez	22 – July 6, 1987	6 ft 11 in (2.11 m)	Cangrejeros de Santurce	(Puerto Rico)
F	12	Nathan Peavy	28 – June 21, 1981	6 ft 8 in (2.03 m)	Artland Dragons	(Germany)
F	13	Renaldo Balkman	27 – September 18, 1981	6 ft 8 in (2.03 m)	Denver Nuggets	(United States)
F	14	Carmelo Lee	31 – June 7, 1977	6 ft 7 in (2.01 m)	Vaqueros de Bayamón	(Puerto Rico)
C	15	Daniel Santiago	32 – June 24, 1976	7 ft 1 in (2.16 m)	Vaqueros de Bayamón	(Puerto Rico)

Head coach

- (Puerto Rico) Manolo Cintron

Legend

- nat field describes country
  of last club
  before the tournament
- Age field is age on August 26, 2009

=== Uruguay ===
Uruguay men's national basketball team roster
Players
Coaches

Pos.	No.	Name	Age – Date of birth	Height	Club	Ctr.
F	4	Sebastián Izaguirre	24 – April 12, 1985	6 ft 9 in (2.06 m)	Paysandú	(Uruguay)
G	5	Gustavo Barrera	24 – April 6, 1985	6 ft 4 in (1.93 m)	Trotamundos de Carabobo	(Venezuela)
F	6	Mauricio Aguiar	26 – February 3, 1983	6 ft 6 in (1.98 m)	Vanoli Cremona	(Italy)
F	7	Emilio Taboada	27 – May 11, 1982	6 ft 4 in (1.93 m)	Regatas Corrientes	(Argentina)
G	8	Diego González	25 – January 9, 1984	5 ft 9 in (1.75 m)	Defensor Sporting	(Uruguay)
F	9	Reque Newsome	27 – October 8, 1981	6 ft 8 in (2.03 m)	Hebraica Macabi	(Uruguay)
G	10	Leandro García	29 – June 27, 1980	6 ft 1 in (1.85 m)	Cocodrilos de Caracas	(Venezuela)
G	11	Martín Osimani	28 – May 22, 1981	6 ft 4 in (1.93 m)	Atleticos San German	(Puerto Rico)
C	12	Gastón Páez	29 – September 22, 1979	6 ft 10 in (2.08 m)	Hebraica y Macabi	(Uruguay)
G	13	Juan Silveira	23 – March 3, 1986	6 ft 3 in (1.91 m)	25 de Agosto	(Uruguay)
F	14	Nicolás Borsellino	22 – May 8, 1986	6 ft 8 in (2.03 m)	Urunday Universitario	(Uruguay)
C	15	Esteban Batista	24 – September 2, 1983	6 ft 10 in (2.08 m)	Libertad Sunchales	(Argentina)

Head coach

- (Uruguay) Gerardo Jauri

Legend

- nat field describes country
  of last club
  before the tournament
- Age field is age on August 26, 2009

=== Virgin Islands ===
Virgin Islands men's national basketball team roster
Players
Coaches

Pos.	No.	Name	Age – Date of birth	Height	Club	Ctr.
G	4	Rasheem Richards	19 – August 9, 1990	5 ft 11 in (1.8 m)	York College	(United States)
G	5	Kevin Sheppard	29 – September 17, 1979	6 ft 0 in (1.83 m)	Piratas de Quebradillas	(Puerto Rico)
G	6	Walter Hodge	22 – September 21, 1986	6 ft 0 in (1.83 m)	University of Florida	(United States)
G	7	Cuthbert Victor	26 – January 30, 1983	6 ft 5 in (1.96 m)	Melilla Baloncesto	(Spain)
C	8	Phil Jones	23 – September 2, 1985	6 ft 11 in (2.11 m)	UNC Charlotte	(United States)
F	9	Jason Edwin	28 – June 24, 1981	6 ft 5 in (1.96 m)	Guaros de Lara	(Venezuela)
G	10	Aaron Brown	17 – March 24, 1992	6 ft 4 in (1.93 m)	St. Benedict's Preparatory School	(United States)
G/F	11	Calvert White	33 – December 7, 1975	6 ft 5 in (1.96 m)	Jam Squad	(United States Virgin Islands)
G/F	12	Reggie Freeman	34 – May 17, 1975	6 ft 7 in (2.01 m)	Vujic Metalac Valjevo	(Serbia)
F	13	Greg Washington	22 – May 25, 1987	6 ft 11 in (2.11 m)	Hofstra University	(United States)
C	14	Kitwana Rhymer	30 – May 22, 1978	6 ft 10 in (2.08 m)	Kryvbasbasket-Lux Kryvyi Rih	(Ukraine)
F	15	David Cooper	24 – November 10, 1983	6 ft 7 in (2.01 m)	Manchester Millrats	(United States)

Head coach

- (United States) Tevester Anderson

Legend

- nat field describes country
  of last club
  before the tournament
- Age field is age on August 26, 2009

== Group B ==
=== Argentina ===
Argentina men's national basketball team roster
Players
Coaches

Pos.	No.	Name	Age – Date of birth	Height	Club	Ctr.
PF	4	Luis Scola	29 – 30 April 1980	2.06 m (6 ft 9 in)	Houston Rockets	(United States)
PG	5	Pablo Prigioni	32 – 17 May 1977	1.86 m (6 ft 1 in)	Real Madrid	(Spain)
C	6	Román González	31 – 28 January 1978	2.10 m (6 ft 11 in)	Quimsa	(Argentina)
PF	7	Leonardo Mainoldi	24 – 4 March 1985	2.04 m (6 ft 8 in)	Fuenlabrada	(Spain)
SG	8	Diego García	29 – 15 September 1979	1.90 m (6 ft 3 in)	Valladolid	(Spain)
PG	9	Juan Pablo Cantero	26 – 19 September 1982	1.84 m (6 ft 0 in)	Atenas	(Argentina)
PF	10	Leonardo Gutiérrez	31 – 16 May 1978	2.00 m (6 ft 7 in)	Peñarol	(Argentina)
SF	11	Matías Sandes	25 – 14 June 1984	2.01 m (6 ft 7 in)	Fuenlabrada	(Spain)
PF	12	Andrés Pelussi	31 – 14 October 1977	1.98 m (6 ft 6 in)	Libertad	(Argentina)
SG	13	Paolo Quinteros	30 – 15 January 1979	1.88 m (6 ft 2 in)	CAI Zaragoza	(Spain)
C	14	Juan Pedro Gutiérrez	24 – 10 October 1983	2.05 m (6 ft 9 in)	Granada	(Spain)
PF	15	Federico Kammerichs	28 – 21 June 1980	2.05 m (6 ft 9 in)	Regatas	(Argentina)

Head coach

- (Argentina) Sergio Hernández

Legend

- nat field describes country
  of last club
  before the tournament
- Age field is age on August 26, 2009

=== Brazil ===
Brazil men's national basketball team roster
Players
Coaches

Pos.	No.	Name	Age – Date of birth	Height	Club	Ctr.
SF	4	Marcelinho Machado	34 – April 12, 1975	6 ft 7 in (2.01 m)	Flamengo	(Brazil)
G/F	5	Duda Machado	26 – September 10, 1982	6 ft 5 in (1.96 m)	Flamengo	(Brazil)
SG	6	Diego Pinheiro	29 – June 14, 1980	6 ft 5 in (1.96 m)	EC Pinheiros	(Brazil)
PF	7	Carlos Olivinha	26 – April 18, 1983	6 ft 8 in (2.03 m)	EC Pinheiros	(Brazil)
G/F	8	Alex Garcia	29 – March 4, 1980	6 ft 4 in (1.93 m)	Universo BRB	(Brazil)
PG	9	Marcelinho Huertas	26 – May 25, 1983	6 ft 3 in (1.91 m)	Caja Laboral Baskonia	(Spain)
G	10	Leandro Barbosa	26 – November 28, 1982	6 ft 4 in (1.93 m)	Phoenix Suns	(United States)
F/C	11	Anderson Varejao	26 – September 28, 1982	6 ft 11 in (2.11 m)	Cleveland Cavaliers	(United States)
PF	12	Guilherme Giovannoni	29 – June 2, 1980	6 ft 8 in (2.03 m)	Universo BRB	(Brazil)
C	13	J. P. Batista	27 – October 29, 1981	6 ft 10 in (2.08 m)	Le Mans	(France)
G/F	14	Jonathan Tavernari	20 – October 29, 1987	6 ft 6 in (1.98 m)	BYU Cougars	(United States)
C	15	Tiago Splitter	23 – January 1, 1985	6 ft 11 in (2.11 m)	Caja Laboral Baskonia	(Spain)

Head coach

- (Spain) José Manuel Monsalve

Legend

- nat field describes country
  of last club
  before the tournament
- Age field is age on August 26, 2009

=== Dominican Republic ===
Dominican Republic men's national basketball team roster
Players
Coaches

Pos.	No.	Name	Age – Date of birth	Height	Club	Ctr.
G	4	Juan Coronado	26 – August 25, 1983	6 ft 4 in (1.93 m)	Jose Horacio Rodriguez	(Dominican Republic)
G	5	Carlos Morban	27 – April 25, 1982	6 ft 2 in (1.88 m)	Lobos Grises UAD	(Mexico)
G	6	Kelvin Pena	28 – October 5, 1980	6 ft 4 in (1.93 m)	Guaiqueries de Margarita	(Venezuela)
G	7	Luis Flores	28 – April 11, 1981	6 ft 2 in (1.88 m)	Hapoel Holon	(Israel)
C	8	Marlon Martínez	30 – January 17, 1979	6 ft 8 in (2.03 m)	Trotamundos de Carabobo	(Venezuela)
F	9	Francisco García	27 – December 31, 1981	6 ft 7 in (2.01 m)	Sacramento Kings	(United States)
F/C	10	Al Horford	23 – June 3, 1986	6 ft 10 in (2.08 m)	Atlanta Hawks	(United States)
F	11	Alejandro Flores	27 – December 4, 1981	6 ft 8 in (2.03 m)	Toros de Aragua	(Venezuela)
F	12	Franklin Western	37 – April 11, 1972	6 ft 6 in (1.98 m)	Vaqueros de Bayamón	(Puerto Rico)
F	13	Charlie Villanueva	25 – August 24, 1984	6 ft 11 in (2.11 m)	Detroit Pistons	(United States)
G/F	14	Ricardo Greer	30 – August 18, 1977	6 ft 5 in (1.96 m)	SLUC Nancy	(France)
F	15	Jack Michael Martinez	26 – October 12, 1981	6 ft 7 in (2.01 m)	Cocodrilos de Caracas	(Venezuela)

Head coach

- (Puerto Rico) Julio Toro

Legend

- nat field describes country
  of last club
  before the tournament
- Age field is age on August 26, 2009

=== Panama ===
Panama men's national basketball team roster
Players
Coaches

Pos.	No.	Name	Age – Date of birth	Height	Club	Ctr.
G	4	Joel Munoz	29 – June 24, 1980	5 ft 10 in (1.78 m)	Magnates de Costa del Este	(Panama)
G	5	Warren Green	30 – February 18, 1979	6 ft 0 in (1.83 m)	Gaiteros del Zulia	(Venezuela)
F	6	Danilo Pinnock	25 – December 11, 1983	6 ft 6 in (1.98 m)	Colosos de Betania	(Panama)
G	7	Maximiliano Gomez	33 – December 18, 1975	6 ft 4 in (1.93 m)	Caimanes de Rio Abajo	(Panama)
F	8	Orlando Ortega	27 – October 3, 1981	6 ft 4 in (1.93 m)	Caimanes de Rio Abajo	(Panama)
F/C	9	Joel Tesis	27 – March 19, 1982	6 ft 9 in (2.06 m)	Navieros de Colon	(Panama)
C	10	Eduardo Archibold	22 – May 19, 1987	6 ft 9 in (2.06 m)	Le Moyne Dolphins	(United States)
F	11	Ernesto Ogilvie	20 – June 30, 1989	6 ft 5 in (1.96 m)	Caimanes de Rio Abajo	(Panama)
F	12	Reyjavick De Gracia	27 – November 5, 1981	6 ft 8 in (2.03 m)	Navieros de Colon	(Panama)
C	13	Ricardo Lindo Kirkland	39 – January 26, 1970	6 ft 9 in (2.06 m)	Fieras de Cocle	(Panama)
F/C	14	Jaime Lloreda	27 – October 11, 1980	6 ft 8 in (2.03 m)	Navieros de Colon	(Panama)
F	15	Gyno Pomare	22 – April 5, 1986	6 ft 8 in (2.03 m)	University of San Diego	(United States)

Head coach

- (Puerto Rico) David Rosario

Legend

- nat field describes country
  of last club
  before the tournament
- Age field is age on August 26, 2009

=== Venezuela ===
Venezuela men's national basketball team roster
Players
Coaches

Pos.	No.	Name	Age – Date of birth	Height	Club	Ctr.
C	4	Miguel Marriaga	25 – June 6, 1984	6 ft 11 in (2.11 m)	Gaiteros del Zulia	(Venezuela)
F	5	Alejandro Barrios	30 – April 24, 1979	6 ft 8 in (2.03 m)	Trotamundos de Carabobo	(Venezuela)
F	6	Gregory Echenique	18 – November 23, 1990	6 ft 9 in (2.06 m)	Rutgers University	(United States)
C	7	Richard Lugo	36 – May 7, 1973	6 ft 9 in (2.06 m)	Trotamundos de Carabobo	(Venezuela)
G	8	Jesus Centeno	23 – December 27, 1985	6 ft 3 in (1.91 m)	Cocodrilos de Caracas	(Venezuela)
G	9	Óscar Torres	32 – December 18, 1976	6 ft 6 in (1.98 m)	Marinos de Anzoátegui	(Venezuela)
C	10	Luis Bethelmy	22 – October 14, 1986	6 ft 7 in (2.01 m)	Lanceros de Cojedes	(Venezuela)
G/F	11	José Vargas	27 – January 23, 1982	6 ft 6 in (1.98 m)	Trotamundos de Carabobo	(Venezuela)
F	12	Hector Romero	29 – January 3, 1980	6 ft 8 in (2.03 m)	Guaiqueríes de Margarita	(Venezuela)
F	13	Axiers Sucre	31 – July 27, 1978	6 ft 6 in (1.98 m)	Tiburones de Vargas	(Venezuela)
G	14	Greivis Vasquez	21 – January 16, 1987	6 ft 6 in (1.98 m)	University of Maryland	(United States)
G/F	15	Rafael Perez	26 – April 10, 1982	6 ft 5 in (1.96 m)	Centauros de Apure	(Venezuela)

Head coach

- (Venezuela) Nestor Salazar

Legend

- nat field describes country
  of last club
  before the tournament
- Age field is age on August 26, 2009
