= 2009 FIBA Americas Championship =

Continental championship held by FIBA Americas

Tournament details
- Host country: Puerto Rico
- City: San Juan
- Dates: August 26 – September 6
- Teams: 10
- Venue: Roberto Clemente Coliseum

Final positions
- Champions: Brazil (4th title)
- Runners-up: Puerto Rico
- Third place: Argentina
- Fourth place: Canada

Tournament statistics
- MVP: (Argentina) Luis Scola
- Top scorer: (Argentina) Luis Scola (23.3 points per game)

The 2009 FIBA Americas Championship, later known as the FIBA AmeriCup, was the continental championship held by FIBA Americas, for North, Central and South America and the Caribbean. This FIBA AmeriCup championship served as a qualifying tournament for the 2010 FIBA World Championship in Turkey. Each of the top four finishers in the quarterfinal round robin qualified for the World Championship.

Brazil won the gold medal, after beating host Puerto Rico, 61–60, in the title game. This was Brazil's fourth FIBA AmeriCup title, and second in the last three tournaments. At the time FIBA world number 1 ranked Argentina claimed the bronze medal, over fourth placed Canada. By making the quarterfinals, all four teams qualified for the 2010 FIBA World Championship. The tournament's leading scorer, Luis Scola, was named MVP of the tournament, after he rallied Argentina from an 0–2 start, to the bronze medal, by leading his team in scoring, in nine out of ten games.

== Host ==
Location of San Juan within Puerto Rico.

The hosting privileges were originally awarded to Mexico but were later removed by FIBA Americas due to issues involving the sponsorship of the event. The other countries that already qualified were then informed by FIBA of the announcement, with Uruguay, Puerto Rico, Argentina and Canada all expressing interest of hosting the tournament.

On May 29, 2009, it was announced that Puerto Rico was selected as the new host of the championships, with the Roberto Clemente Coliseum in San Juan as the venue. Puerto Rico had previously hosted the 1980, 1993, 1999 and the 2003 Tournament of the Americas (prior to the tournament being renamed the FIBA Americas Championship.

== Venues ==
All games were played at Roberto Clemente Coliseum, which hosted games in each of Puerto Rico's previous four times hosting the FIBA Americas Championship. The 10,000-seat arena also hosted the final round of the 1974 FIBA World Championship after construction was completed in January 1973.

San Juan
Roberto Clemente Coliseum
Capacity: 10,000
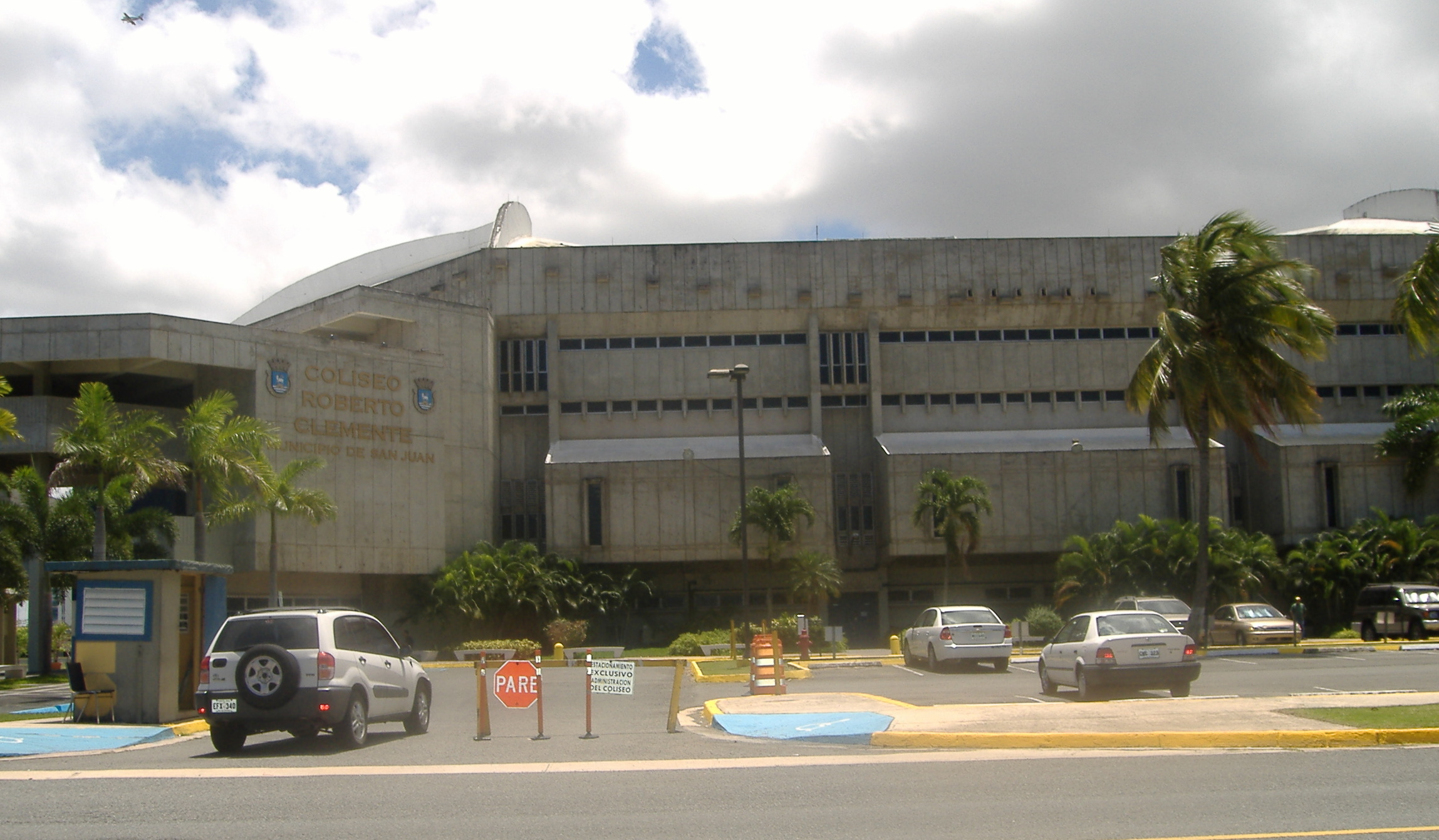

== Qualification ==
Qualification was done via FIBA Americas' sub-zones. The qualified teams are:

- South American Sub-Zone (2008 South American Basketball Championship):
  - Argentina
  - Brazil
  - Uruguay
  - Venezuela
- North America Sub-Zone:
  - Canada
- Central American and Caribbean Zone (2008 Centrobasket):
  - Panama
    - Cuba withdrew.
  - Dominican Republic
  - Mexico
  - Puerto Rico
  - Virgin Islands

The draw was done on June 9, at the Roberto Clemente Coliseum. Panama replaced Cuba after the latter withdrew.

The United States, which had qualified for the World Championship with a gold-medal performance in the 2008 Beijing Olympics, skipped this tournament, opening the slot for another team from the Centrobasket championship to qualify. Besides the United States, every participating nation from the FIBA Americas Championship 2007 qualified for this tournament, although Panama only returned by virtue of Cuba's withdrawal. The Dominican Republic returned to the tournament for the ninth time after failing to qualify in 2007.

== Draw ==
The draw ceremonies were held at San Juan on June 9, 2009. The results, with the FIBA World Rankings prior to the draw, were:

Group A	Group B
11. Puerto Rico; 19. Canada; 28. Uruguay; 29. Mexico; 36. Virgin Islands	1. Argentina; 16. Brazil; 21. Venezuela; 31. Dominican Republic; 30. Panama

Note: Cuba had 0 ranking points and was therefore ranked after the last ranked team. However, once Cuba withdrew, Panama, ranked 30th, took Cuba's spot in Group B.

== Format ==
- The top four teams from each group advance to the quarterfinals.
- Results and standings among teams within the same group are carried over.
- The top four teams at the quarterfinals advance to the semifinals (1 vs. 4, 2 vs. 3). The top four also qualify outright to the 2010 FIBA World Championship.
- The winners in the knockout semifinals advance to the Final. The losers play for third place.

=== Tie-breaking criteria ===
Ties are broken via the following the criteria, with the first option used first, all the way down to the last option:

1. Head to head results
2. Goal average (not the goal difference) between the tied teams
3. Goal average of the tied teams for all teams in its group

== Squads ==
Each team had a roster of twelve players. Seven players currently on NBA rosters played in the tournament. The Dominican Republic led the way with three: Francisco Garcia, Al Horford, and Charlie Villanueva. Brazil (Anderson Varejão, Leandro Barbosa), Canada (Joel Anthony), and Argentina (Luis Scola) also called up NBA players to their rosters.

== Preliminary round ==
Qualified for the quarterfinals
Eliminated in preliminary round

=== Group A ===
In Group A, hosts Puerto Rico stormed through to the quarterfinals undefeated, winning each game by double digits. On the fourth day of group play, surprising Uruguay stunned Canada, which had won its previous two games by a combined 75 points, for second place in the group after Martin Osimani hit a three with 21 seconds that gave the Uruguayans a 71–69 victory. Mexico dominated the second half against the Virgin Islands en route to a 17-point victory and the final quarterfinal spot out of Group A.

Team	Pts	Pld	W	L	PF	PA	PD
Puerto Rico	8	4	4	0	327	264	+63
Uruguay	7	4	3	1	267	251	+16
Canada	6	4	2	2	321	268	+53
Mexico	5	4	1	3	235	293	−58
Virgin Islands	4	4	0	4	266	340	−74

August 26
13:30

Report

Virgin Islands	62–88	Uruguay
Scoring by quarter: 14–22, 15–27, 20–17, 13–22
Pts: K. Sheppard 17; Rebs: Rhymer and Victor 6 each Asts: K. Sheppard 4		Pts: L. Garcia 28; Rebs: E. Batista 13; Asts: Barrera and Osimani 6 each

Roberto Clemente Coliseum, San Juan

August 26
21:00

Report

Mexico	66–81	Puerto Rico
Scoring by quarter: 19–19, 23–19, 9–23, 15–20
Pts: R. Beck 26; Rebs: G. Ayon 9 Asts: Quintero and Ayon 3 each		Pts: L. Ayuso 16; Rebs: D. Santiago 11; Asts: C. Arroyo 11

Roberto Clemente Coliseum, San Juan

August 27
16:00

Report

Canada	95–40	Mexico
Scoring by quarter: 30–13, 19–8, 29–12, 17–7
Pts: A. Rautins 18; Rebs: L. Kendall 11; Asts: J. Anderson 7		Pts: N. Alonzo 10; Rebs: G. Ayon 10; Asts: A. Pedroza 3

Roberto Clemente Coliseum, San Juan

August 27
21:00

Report

Puerto Rico	85–74	Virgin Islands
Scoring by quarter: 16–21, 22–22, 26–10, 21–21
Pts: C. Arroyo 24; Rebs: P. Ramos 10; Asts: C. Arroyo 5		Pts: Sheppard and Jones 18 each Rebs: Victor and Jones 7 each Asts: Sheppard and Hodge 5 each

Roberto Clemente Coliseum, San Juan

August 28
16:00

Report

Virgin Islands	67–87	Canada
Scoring by quarter: 14–24, 12–20, 22–20, 19–23
Pts: W. Hodge 18; Rebs: K. Rhymer 11; Asts: W. Hodge 5		Pts: J. Young 14; Rebs: L. Kendall 8 Asts: A. Rautins 5

Roberto Clemente Coliseum, San Juan

August 28
21:00

Report

Uruguay	54–71	Puerto Rico
Scoring by quarter: 14–14, 14–16, 11–23, 15–18
Pts: E. Batista 19; Rebs: E. Batista 8 Asts: Barrera and Osimani 2 each		Pts: C. Arroyo 18; Rebs: P. Ramos 12; Asts: C. Arroyo 6

Roberto Clemente Coliseum, San Juan

August 29
13:30

Report

Mexico	80–63	Virgin Islands
Scoring by quarter: 15–13, 12–19, 26–18, 27–13
Pts: Quintero and Pedroza 17 each Rebs: G. Ayon 15; Asts: Quintero and Llamas 7 each		Pts: K. Sheppard 18; Rebs: Freeman and Victor 9 each Asts: K. Sheppard 5

Roberto Clemente Coliseum, San Juan

August 29
16:00

Report

Canada	69–71	Uruguay
Scoring by quarter: 16–25, 15–11, 16–15, 22–20
Pts: J. Young 20; Rebs: J. Young 8 Asts: J. Anderson 6		Pts: E. Batista 18; Rebs: E. Batista 12; Asts: M. Osimani 9

Roberto Clemente Coliseum, San Juan

August 30
13:30

Report

Uruguay	54–49	Mexico
Scoring by quarter: 18–10, 8–19, 18–4, 10–16
Pts: M. Aguiar 15; Rebs: E. Batista 18; Asts: Barrera and Osimani 4 each		Pts: G. Ayon 12; Rebs: G. Ayon 11; Asts: K. Malpica 4

Roberto Clemente Coliseum, San Juan

August 30
21:00

Report

Puerto Rico	90–70	Canada
Scoring by quarter: 23–14, 22–16, 20–11, 25–29
Pts: Ayuso and Arroyo 16 each Rebs: D. Santiago 8 Asts: F. Rivera 3		Pts: A. Rautins 18; Rebs: J. Anthony 10; Asts: C. English 3

Roberto Clemente Coliseum, San Juan
Attendance: 10000

=== Group B ===
Group B began with a shocker as Venezuela dominated world number one ranked Argentina, forcing 23 turnovers en route to a 16-point victory. Group winner Brazil was the only consistent team in the group, winning all of its games by at least nine points. The Dominican Republic, sporting a roster that included a tournament-high three NBA players, qualified to the quarterfinals with a 2–2 record. Argentina, buoyed by tournament scoring leader Luis Scola, rebounded from an 0–2 start to win its last two games and qualify for the next round. Venezuela could not capitalize on its victory over Argentina and was sent home after losing to Panama. The Venezuelans could have advanced on a tiebreaker had Argentina lost to the Dominicans, but Charlie Villanueva missed a three-pointer at the buzzer in overtime and Argentina escaped with an 89–87 victory in the final game of group play.

Team	Pts	Pld	W	L	PF	PA	PD	Tie
Brazil	8	4	4	0	328	266	+62	
Argentina	6	4	2	2	305	303	+2	1–0
Dominican Republic	6	4	2	2	333	330	+3	0–1
Panama	5	4	1	3	286	335	−49	1–0
Venezuela	5	4	1	3	296	314	−18	0–1

August 26
16:00

Report

Dominican Republic	68–81	Brazil
Scoring by quarter: 18–21, 18–17, 25–19, 7–24
Pts: F. Garcia 17; Rebs: J. Martínez 9 Asts: L. Flores 9		Pts: Barbosa and Garcia 21 each Rebs: Varejão and Splitter 10 each Asts: M. Huertas 9

Roberto Clemente Coliseum, San Juan

August 26
18:30

Report

Venezuela	85–69	Argentina
Scoring by quarter: 18–16, 21–14, 24–21, 22–18
Pts: O. Torres 22; Rebs: O. Torres 6 Asts: G. Vasquez 7		Pts: L. Scola 25; Rebs: L. Scola 7 Asts: P. Prigioni 6

Roberto Clemente Coliseum, San Juan

August 27
13:30

Report

Panama	87–100	Dominican Republic
Scoring by quarter: 27–25, 23–23, 10–28, 27–24
Pts: D. Pinnock 27; Rebs: J. Lloreda 14; Asts: J. Lloreda 6		Pts: F. Garcia 24; Rebs: C. Villanueva 10; Asts: C. Morban 6

Roberto Clemente Coliseum, San Juan

August 27
18:30

Report

Brazil	87–67	Venezuela
Scoring by quarter: 18–18, 26–6, 19–19, 24–24
Pts: L. Barbosa 15; Rebs: A. Varejão 9 Asts: A. Garcia 5		Pts: Perez and Lugo 12 each Rebs: R. Lugo 6 Asts: J. Centeno 5

Roberto Clemente Coliseum, San Juan

August 28
13:30

Report

Argentina	67–76	Brazil
Scoring by quarter: 13–21, 10–16, 23–23, 21–16
Pts: L. Scola 19; Rebs: F. Kammerichs 10; Asts: P. Prigioni 8		Pts: L. Barbosa 21; Rebs: A. Varejão 9 Asts: M. Huertas 5

Roberto Clemente Coliseum, San Juan

August 28
18:30

Report

Venezuela	71–80	Panama
Scoring by quarter: 12–22, 14–17, 28–18, 17–23
Pts: Romero and G Vasquez 17 each Rebs: R. Lugo 14; Asts: G. Vasquez 5		Pts: J. Lloreda 19; Rebs: Lloreda and Pomare 8 each Asts: J. Lloreda 5

Roberto Clemente Coliseum, San Juan

August 29
18:30

Report

Dominican Republic	78–73	Venezuela
Scoring by quarter: 21–18, 19–14, 24–19, 14–22
Pts: C. Villanueva 28; Rebs: Horford and Villanueva 12 each Asts: C. Morban 5		Pts: H. Romero 25; Rebs: Lugo and Romero 9 each Asts: G. Vasquez 7

Roberto Clemente Coliseum, San Juan

August 29
21:00

Report

Panama	55–80	Argentina
Scoring by quarter: 13–28, 17–20, 19–12, 6–20
Pts: W. Green 18; Rebs: W. Green 9 Asts: D. Pinnock 5		Pts: L. Scola 20; Rebs: P. Prigioni 8 Asts: P. Prigioni 8

Roberto Clemente Coliseum, San Juan

August 30
16:00

Report

Brazil	84–64	Panama
Scoring by quarter: 23–17, 19–19, 28–14, 14–14
Pts: L. Barbosa 17; Rebs: T. Splitter 7 Asts: Garcia and Huertas 5 each		Pts: D. Pinnock 24; Rebs: L. Pomare 10; Asts: J. Lloreda 5

Roberto Clemente Coliseum, San Juan

August 30
18:30

Report

Argentina	89–87 (OT)	Dominican Republic
Scoring by quarter: 19–18, 18–25, 22–17, 15–14, Overtime: 15–13
Pts: L. Scola 30; Rebs: L. Scola 8 Asts: Scola and Prigioni 5 each		Pts: A. Horford 24; Rebs: Martínez and Horford 11 each Asts: A. Horford 6

Roberto Clemente Coliseum, San Juan

== Quarterfinals ==
In the quarterfinals, Brazil and Puerto Rico easily clinched a semifinal berth and qualification for the 2010 FIBA World Championship when both teams won their first two quarterfinal games to run their records to 5–0. World number one ranked Argentina also qualified, winning all four of their quarterfinal games to erase an 0–2 start and escape a nearly disastrous result. All three teams finished 6–1. Argentina handed Puerto Rico its first loss of the tournament, 80–78, when Pablo Prigioni hit two free throws with four seconds left in the game. Puerto Rico then handed the Brazilians their first loss in the tournament, after the Puerto Ricans took a 16-point fourth quarter lead and withstood a late charge to win by four. A tiebreaker gave Brazil the top seed in the semifinals.

Uruguay could not continue its momentum from its surprising 3–1 start, losing all four of its quarterfinal games. With Panama and Mexico already eliminated from semifinal contention, a Uruguay loss to Argentina on the final day of group play meant that the winner of the Canada-Dominican Republic game would advance to the semifinals and claim the final 2010 FIBA World Championship berth from the Americas. The Canadians slipped through with a four-point victory over a Dominican team that was playing without its star player, Francisco Garcia, after he broke a finger in quarterfinal play. Canada advanced to the World Championship despite a 1–4 start to the round after winning their last two quarterfinal games.

Team	Pts	Pld	W	L	PF	PA	PD	Tie*	
Brazil	13	7	6	1	565	467	+98	1–1	1.03
Puerto Rico	13	7	6	1	570	479	+91	1–1	1.01
Argentina	13	7	6	1	533	478	+55	1–1	0.95
Canada	10	7	3	4	521	477	+44	1–0	
Dominican Republic	10	7	3	4	573	569	+4	0–1	
Uruguay	9	7	2	5	458	507	−49		
Mexico	8	7	1	6	428	552	−124	1–0	
Panama	8	7	1	6	472	591	−119	0–1	

- Tiebreaker for tied teams is head-to-head results. Because Brazil, Puerto Rico, and Argentina split games against each other, the second tiebreaker, goal average for tied teams, was used.

September 1
13:30

Report

Uruguay	74–80	Dominican Republic
Scoring by quarter: 15–14, 25–19, 24–23, 10–24
Pts: L. Garcia 28; Rebs: E. Batista 8 Asts: G. Barrera 8		Pts: C. Villanueva 19; Rebs: A. Horford 12; Asts: F. García 4

Roberto Clemente Coliseum, San Juan
Attendance: 1500

September 1
16:00

Report

Canada	51–67	Argentina
Scoring by quarter: 13–15, 15–21, 10–20, 13–11
Pts: C. English 17; Rebs: C. English 6 Asts: T. Kepkay 3		Pts: L. Gutiérrez 15; Rebs: L. Scola 9 Asts: P. Prigioni 7

Roberto Clemente Coliseum, San Juan

September 1
18:30

Report

Mexico	61–92	Brazil
Scoring by quarter: 17–24, 12–21, 16–24, 16–23
Pts: O. Quintero 13; Rebs: A. Parada 12; Asts: Zúñiga and Parada 3		Pts: L. Barbosa 18; Rebs: A. Varejão 12; Asts: M. Machado 5

Roberto Clemente Coliseum, San Juan
Attendance: 1500

September 1
21:00

Report

Puerto Rico	79–51	Panama
Scoring by quarter: 11–13, 23–12, 25–14, 20–12
Pts: Ramos and Diaz 12 each Rebs: P. Ramos 11; Asts: C. Arroyo 4		Pts: D. Pinnock 23; Rebs: J. Lloreda 7 Asts: J. Lloreda 3

Roberto Clemente Coliseum, San Juan

September 2
13:30

Report

Brazil	68–59	Canada
Scoring by quarter: 18–15, 18–18, 16–17, 16–9
Pts: L. Barbosa 31; Rebs: A. Varejão 7 Asts: T. Splitter 3		Pts: L. Kendall 12; Rebs: L. Kendall 7 Asts: A. Rautins 5

Roberto Clemente Coliseum, San Juan

September 2
16:00

Report

Panama	83–77	Uruguay
Scoring by quarter: 16–17, 14–21, 28–19, 25–20
Pts: W. Green 25; Rebs: 3 tied with 7 Asts: J. Munoz 6		Pts: E. Batista 18; Rebs: E. Batista 11; Asts: M. Osimani 7

Roberto Clemente Coliseum, San Juan
Attendance: 1000

September 2
18:30

Report

Argentina	77–65	Mexico
Scoring by quarter: 17–17, 17–12, 23–18, 20–18
Pts: L. Scola 25; Rebs: F. Kammerichs 11; Asts: P. Prigioni 7		Pts: G. Ayon 18; Rebs: G. Ayon 9 Asts: Llamas and Ayon 3 each

Roberto Clemente Coliseum, San Juan

September 2
21:00

Report

Dominican Republic	76–85	Puerto Rico
Scoring by quarter: 13–16, 21–21, 19–21, 23–27
Pts: C. Villanueva 21; Rebs: A. Horford 10; Asts: L. Flores 9		Pts: C. Arroyo 17; Rebs: P. Ramos 8 Asts: C. Arroyo 5

Roberto Clemente Coliseum, San Juan
Attendance: 10000

September 3
13:00

Report

Canada	97–65	Panama
Scoring by quarter: 22–15, 23–9, 26–19, 26–22
Pts: A. Rautins 23; Rebs: J. Anthony 5 Asts: J. Anderson 5		Pts: D. Pinnock 21; Rebs: J. Lloreda 10; Asts: 3 tied with 2

Roberto Clemente Coliseum, San Juan

September 3
15:15

Report

Mexico	73–86	Dominican Republic
Scoring by quarter: 15–22, 18–22, 25–24, 15–18
Pts: H. Llamas 16; Rebs: 3 tied with 5 Asts: A. Pedroza 5		Pts: L. Flores 18; Rebs: A. Horford 9 Asts: 4 tied with 3

Roberto Clemente Coliseum, San Juan

September 3
17:30

Report

Uruguay	62–82	Brazil
Scoring by quarter: 14–22, 21–22, 16–18, 11–20
Pts: M. Aguiar 18; Rebs: G. Barrera 9 Asts: G. Barrera 6		Pts: M. Machado 23; Rebs: A. Varejao 10; Asts: Huertas and Machado 4 each

Roberto Clemente Coliseum, San Juan
Attendance: 2000

September 3
19:45

Report

Puerto Rico	78–80	Argentina
Scoring by quarter: 22–14, 15–29, 15–21, 26–16
Pts: L. Ayuso 19; Rebs: P. Ramos 12; Asts: C. Arroyo 8		Pts: L. Scola 25; Rebs: L. Scola 12; Asts: P. Prigioni 12

Roberto Clemente Coliseum, San Juan
Attendance: 8000

September 4
13:30

Report

Panama	67–74	Mexico
Scoring by quarter: 18–18, 14–21, 20–19, 15–16
Pts: D. Pinnock 20; Rebs: J. Lloreda 13; Asts: D. Pinnock 4		Pts: Llamas and Pedroza 18 each Rebs: G. Ayon 13; Asts: Zúñiga and Pedroza 6 each

Roberto Clemente Coliseum, San Juan

September 4
16:00

Report

Argentina	73–66	Uruguay
Scoring by quarter: 22–6, 16–17, 21–23, 14–20
Pts: L. Scola 19; Rebs: L. Scola 8 Asts: J. Cantero 6		Pts: E. Batista 20; Rebs: E. Batista 10; Asts: G. Barrera 2

Roberto Clemente Coliseum, San Juan

September 4
18:30

Report

Dominican Republic	76–80	Canada
Scoring by quarter: 16–13, 19–17, 21–26, 20–24
Pts: Flores and Villanueva 17 each Rebs: A. Horford 14; Asts: L. Flores 6		Pts: J. Anderson 21; Rebs: L. Kendall 11; Asts: Rautins and Anderson 5 each

Roberto Clemente Coliseum, San Juan
Attendance: 7000

September 4
21:00

Report

Brazil	82–86	Puerto Rico
Scoring by quarter: 20–13, 14–25, 17–29, 31–19
Pts: A. Varejao 22; Rebs: A. Varejao 10; Asts: M. Huertas 6		Pts: L. Ayuso 25; Rebs: C. Lee 7 Asts: C. Arroyo 6

Roberto Clemente Coliseum, San Juan
Attendance: 10000

== Knockout round ==
Semi-finals
September 5 – San Juan
Brazil	73
Canada	65
September 5 – San Juan
Puerto Rico	85
Argentina	80

Final
September 6 – San Juan
Brazil	61
Puerto Rico	60
Third place
September 6 – San Juan
Canada	73
Argentina	88

=== Semi finals ===
In the first semifinal, top seeded Brazil faced a surprising challenge from fourth seeded Canada. The Brazilians only led by one at halftime before blowing the game open in the second half, jumping out to a 17-point fourth quarter lead before the Canadians went on a late run to cut the final deficit to eight. In the second semifinal, Puerto Rico erased a nine-point deficit in a five-point victory over Argentina. The host team avenged a quarterfinal loss to the Argentine team despite Luis Scola's tournament-high 31 points.

September 5
18:30

Report

Brazil	73–65	Canada
Scoring by quarter: 17–17, 11–10, 26–13, 19–25
Pts: L. Barbosa 22; Rebs: A. Varejao 8 Asts: M. Huertas 8		Pts: J. Anthony 17; Rebs: J. Anthony 8 Asts: 3 tied with 4

Roberto Clemente Coliseum, San Juan
Attendance: 6000

September 5
21:00

Report

Puerto Rico	85–80	Argentina
Scoring by quarter: 13–20, 19–21, 26–19, 27–20
Pts: C. Arroyo 19; Rebs: P. Ramos 9 Asts: C. Arroyo 4		Pts: L. Scola 31; Rebs: 3 tied with 5 Asts: P. Prigioni 10

Roberto Clemente Coliseum, San Juan
Attendance: 10000

=== Third place ===
In the bronze medal match, Argentina never trailed while jumping out to a 31-point halftime lead. The over-matched Canadians could not cut the lead below double digits at any time after the first quarter.

September 6
18:30

Report

Canada	73–88	Argentina
Scoring by quarter: 8–31, 10–18, 28–19, 27–20
Pts: J. Anderson 19; Rebs: O. Famutimi 9 Asts: J. Anderson 11		Pts: L. Scola 27; Rebs: J. Gutiérrez 6 Asts: P. Prigioni 8

Roberto Clemente Coliseum, San Juan
Attendance: 7000

=== Final ===
Brazil claimed the gold medal over the host Puerto Ricans in a 61–60 thriller. The Brazilians took a 13-point lead into the fourth quarter and led by 11 with 5:45 left before the Puerto Ricans began a frantic run to get back in the game. After Carlos Arroyo hit a basket with 35 seconds left to pull the Puerto Ricans within two at 61–59, Puerto Rican youngster Angel Vassalo stole the ball and was fouled. After hitting the first, Vassalo missed the second free throw; the Puerto Ricans did get the ball back, but Carlos Arroyo missed a 3-pointer at the buzzer and Brazil hung on for a 61–60 victory to claim its fourth FIBA Americas Championship.

September 6
21:00

Report

Brazil	61–60	Puerto Rico
Scoring by quarter: 19–13, 17–15, 14–9, 11–23
Pts: L. Barbosa 24; Rebs: T. Splitter 9 Asts: T. Splitter 4		Pts: C. Arroyo 14; Rebs: R. Sanchez 7 Asts: F. Rivera 4

Roberto Clemente Coliseum, San Juan
Attendance: 10000

== Awards ==
2009 Tournament of the Americas winners

Brazil
Fourth title

== Statistical leaders ==
=== Individual Tournament Highs ===
Points

Pos.	Name	PPG
1	(Argentina) Luis Scola	23.3
2	(Brazil) Leandro Barbosa	21.1
3	(Panama) Danilo Pinnock	20.1
4	(Venezuela) Hector Romero	18
5	(Dominican Republic) Charlie Villanueva	17.1
6	(Puerto Rico) Carlos Arroyo	16.8
7	(Uruguay) Esteban Batista	16.6
8	(Dominican Republic) Francisco Garcia	15.8
8	(United States Virgin Islands) Kevin Sheppard	15.8
10	(Dominican Republic) Luis Flores	14.8

Rebounds

Pos.	Name	RPG
1	(Uruguay) Esteban Batista	10.5
2	(Dominican Republic) Al Horford	10.2
3	(Mexico) Gustavo Ayon	9.4
4	(Panama) Jaime Lloreda	8.6
5	(Brazil) Anderson Varejão	8.4
6	(Venezuela) Richard Lugo	8
7	(Puerto Rico) Peter John Ramos	7.8
8	(Dominican Republic) Charlie Villanueva	7.4
9	(Dominican Republic) Jack Michael Martínez	7.2
10	(Brazil) Tiago Splitter	7.2

Assists

Pos.	Name	APG
1	(Argentina) Pablo Prigioni	7.4
2	(Venezuela) Greivis Vasquez	5.5
3	(Puerto Rico) Carlos Arroyo	5.3
4	(Brazil) Marcelo Huertas	4.9
4	(Dominican Republic) Luis Flores	4.9
6	(Uruguay) Panchi Barrera	4.8
7	(Uruguay) Martin Osimani	4.6
8	(United States Virgin Islands) Kevin Sheppard	4.5
9	(Canada) Jermaine Anderson	4.2
10	(United States Virgin Islands) Walter Hodge	3.5

Steals

Pos.	Name	SPG
1	(United States Virgin Islands) Walter Hodge	3
2	(Argentina) Pablo Prigioni	2.6
3	(Panama) Danilo Pinnock	2
3	(Uruguay) Leandro Garcia	2
3	(Mexico) Gustavo Ayon	2
6	(Brazil) Anderson Varejão	1.9
7	(Canada) Olu Famutimi	1.8
7	(Uruguay) Esteban Batista	1.8
7	(Uruguay) Panchi Barrera	1.8
10	(Dominican Republic) Luis Flores	1.5

Blocks

Pos.	Name	BPG
1	(Brazil) Anderson Varejão	1.9
2	(Dominican Republic) Francisco Garcia	1.8
3	(Mexico) Gustavo Ayon	1.5
4	(Canada) Joel Anthony	1.4
5	(Venezuela) Richard Lugo	1.3
5	(United States Virgin Islands) Kitwana Rhymer	1.2
7	(Puerto Rico) Peter John Ramos	1.1
7	(Dominican Republic) Charlie Villanueva	1.1
7	(Puerto Rico) Daniel Santiago	1.1
10	4 tied with 1	

Minutes

Pos.	Name	MPG
1	(Panama) Danilo Pinnock	38.4
2	(Dominican Republic) Francisco Garcia	36.5
3	(Dominican Republic) Luis Flores	34.4
4	(United States Virgin Islands) Kevin Sheppard	34.3
5	(Uruguay) Esteban Batista	33.6
5	(Panama) Jaime Lloreda	33.6
7	(Panama) Warren Green	33.3
8	(Dominican Republic) Al Horford	33.1
9	(Mexico) Gustavo Ayon	32.9
9	(Brazil) Leandro Barbosa	32.9

=== Individual Game Highs ===
Department	Name	Total	Opponent
Points	(Brazil) Leandro Barbosa (Argentina) Luis Scola	31	Canada; Puerto Rico
Rebounds	(Uruguay) Esteban Batista	18	Mexico
Assists	(Argentina) Pablo Prigioni	12	Puerto Rico
Steals	(Argentina) Pablo Prigioni	6	Canada
Blocks	(Mexico) Gustavo Ayon (Brazil) Anderson Varejão	6	Virgin Islands; Uruguay
Field goal percentage	(Puerto Rico) Angel Vassalo	100% (8/8)	Brazil
3-point field goal percentage	4 tied with 100% (3/3)		
Free throw percentage	(Puerto Rico) Larry Ayuso	100% (11/11)	Brazil
Turnovers	(Venezuela) Richard Lugo	8	Panama

=== Team Tournament Highs ===
Offensive PPG

Pos.	Name	PPG
1	Dominican Republic	81.4
2	Puerto Rico	80
3	Brazil	78.6
4	Argentina	77
5	Canada	74.6

Defensive PPG

Pos.	Name	PPG
1	Brazil	65.9
2	Puerto Rico	69.4
3	Canada	70.5
4	Uruguay	71.1
5	Argentina	72.1

Rebounds

Pos.	Name	RPG
1	Dominican Republic	37.8
2	Brazil	34.8
3	Puerto Rico	34.7
4	Mexico	33.5
5	Panama	32.8

Assists

Pos.	Name	APG
1	Canada	18.1
2	Dominican Republic	17.8
3	Brazil	17.3
4	Argentina	17.2
5	Puerto Rico	16.1

Steals

Pos.	Name	SPG
1	Argentina	8.1
1	Canada	8.1
3	Brazil	8
4	Uruguay	7.6
5	Panama	7.1

Blocks

Pos.	Name	BPG
1	Dominican Republic	4.8
2	Venezuela	4.2
3	Mexico	4.1
4	Brazil	3.2
4	Puerto Rico	3.2

=== Team Game highs ===
Department	Name	Total	Opponent
Points	Dominican Republic	100	Panama
Rebounds	Canada	47	Mexico
Assists	Canada	30	Mexico
Steals	Argentina	18	Canada
Blocks	Mexico	9	Virgin Islands
Field goal percentage	Dominican Republic	57.6%	Panama
3-point field goal percentage	Argentina	58.8%	Puerto Rico
Free throw percentage	Dominican Republic	100% (13/13)	Uruguay
Turnovers	Argentina	23	Venezuela

== Final standings ==
Qualified for 2010 FIBA World Championships

Rank	Team	Record
1st place, gold medalist(s)	Brazil	9–1
2nd place, silver medalist(s)	Puerto Rico	8–2
3rd place, bronze medalist(s)	Argentina	7–3
4	Canada	4–6
5	Dominican Republic	4–4
6	Uruguay	3–5
7	Mexico	2–6
8	Panama	2–6
9	Venezuela	1–3
10	Virgin Islands	0–4

1st	2nd	3rd	4th
Brazil Marcelinho Machado; Duda Machado; Diego Pinheiro; Olivinha; Alex Garcia; Marcelo Huertas; Leandro Barbosa; Anderson Varejão; Guilherme Giovannoni; João Paulo Batista; Jonathan Tavernari; Tiago Splitter	Puerto Rico Peter Ramos; Guillermo Diaz; Filiberto Rivera; Carlos Arroyo; Angel Vassallo; Christian Dalmau; Larry Ayuso; Ricardo Sanchez; Luis Villafañe; Angelo Reyes; Carmelo Lee; Daniel Santiago	Argentina Luis Scola; Pablo Prigioni; Román González; Leonardo Mainoldi; Diego García; Juan Pablo Cantero; Leonardo Gutiérrez; Matias Sandes; Andress Pelussi; Paolo Quinteros; Juan Pedro Gutiérrez; Federico Kammerichs	Canada Jermaine Anderson; Tyler Kepkay; Ryan Bell; Jermaine Bucknor; Carl English; Olu Famutimi; Andy Rautins; Aaron Doornekamp; Jesse Young; Kyle Landry; Levon Kendall; Joel Anthony

== All-Tournament Teams ==
The following players were voted to the All-Tournament Teams by latinbasket.com (unofficial):

=== First Team ===
G – (Puerto Rico) Carlos Arroyo
G – (Brazil) Leandro Barbosa
F – (Dominican Republic) Al Horford
F – (Argentina) Luis Scola (Tournament MVP)
C – (Uruguay) Esteban Batista

=== Second Team ===
G – (Argentina) Pablo Prigioni
G – (Puerto Rico) Larry Ayuso
F – (Panama) Danilo Pinnock
F – (Dominican Republic) Charlie Villanueva
C – (Brazil) Anderson Varejão

=== Third Team ===
G – (Canada) Jermaine Anderson
G – (Uruguay) Leandro Garcia
F – (Venezuela) Hector Romero
F – (Canada) Joel Anthony
C – (Puerto Rico) Peter John Ramos
