= Basketball at the 2011 Pan American Games – Men's tournament =

Basketball – Men's tournament at the 2011 Pan American Games
- Venue: CODE Dome
- Dates: October 26–30
- Competitors: 96 from 8 nations

Medalists
Gold medal	Puerto Rico
Silver medal	Mexico
Bronze medal	United States

The men's tournament of basketball at the 2011 Pan American Games in Guadalajara, Mexico began on October 26 and ended on October 30, when Puerto Rico defeated Mexico 74-72 for the gold medal. All games were held at the CODE Dome. The defending champion was Brazil, who won the title on their home court.

== Qualification ==
Three teams automatically qualified to compete in this tournament, the hosts Mexico, Canada and the United States. The rest qualified through two regional tournaments.

Event	Date	Location	Vacancies	Qualified
Host Nation	–	–	1	Mexico
Automatic Qualification			2	Canada; United States
2010 Centrobasket	July 5–12, 2010	(Dominican Republic) Santo Domingo	2	Puerto Rico; Dominican Republic
South American Basketball Championship 2010	July 26–31, 2010	(Colombia) Neiva	3	Brazil; Argentina; Uruguay
TOTAL			8	

== Format ==
- Eight teams are split into 2 preliminary round groups of 4 teams each. The top 2 teams from each group qualify for the knockout stage.
- The third and fourth placed teams will play the fifth to eight bracket.
- In the semifinals, the matchups are as follows: A1 vs. B2 and B1 vs. A2
- The winning teams from the semifinals play for the gold medal. The losing teams compete for the bronze medal.

Ties are broken via the following the criteria, with the first option used first, all the way down to the last option:

1. Head to head results.
2. Goal average (not the goal difference) between the tied teams.
3. Goal average of the tied teams for all teams in its group.

== Squads ==
At the start of tournament, all eight participating countries had 12 players on their rosters. Final squads for the tournament were due on September 14, 2011, a month before the start of 2011 Pan American Games.

- Argentina
- Brazil
- Canada
- Dominican Republic
- Mexico
- Puerto Rico
- United States
- Uruguay

== Draw ==
The draw for the tournament was held at the Weightlifting Forum, the venue for the Weightlifting at the games in Guadalajara on June 26 and was conducted by FIBA Americas Technical Director, Mr. Anibal García.

The competing are drawn to each group by couples to secure a balance in the competition. The first team selected randomly in the draw goes to group A and the second to Group B. Mexico as host nation got to choose which team from the first pot it played, Argentina.

Each team is listed with their world ranking before the draw.

Pot 1	Pot 2	Pot 3	Pot 4
United States (1); Argentina (3)	Brazil (16); Puerto Rico (15)	Canada (23); Dominican Republic (30)	Mexico (27); Uruguay (25)

== Preliminary round ==
All times are local Central Daylight Time (UTC−5)

=== Group A ===
Pos	Team	Pld	W	L	PF	PA	PD	Pts	Qualification
1	Puerto Rico	3	2	1	231	206	+25	5 (Note: Puerto Rico 73–69 Mexico)	Advance to Semifinals
2	Mexico (H)	3	2	1	231	194	+37	5	Advance to Semifinals
3	Canada	3	1	2	206	238	−32	4 (Note: Canada 83–79 Argentina)	
4	Argentina	3	1	2	214	244	−30	4	

(H) Hosts
Notes:

October 26
10:30

Report

Canada	83–79 (OT)	Argentina
Scoring by quarter: 16–22, 18–17, 10–14, 26–17, Overtime: 13–9
Pts: Scrubb, 35; Rebs: Ward, 10; Asts: Scrubb, 3		Pts: Laprovíttola, 16; Rebs: Espinoza, 7 Asts: Cequeira, 4

CODE Dome, Guadalajara
Referees: Vazquez (URU), Rodriguez (VEN), Stith (USA)

October 26
20:00

Report

Mexico	69–73	Puerto Rico
Scoring by quarter: 24–16, 20–22, 7–16, 18–19
Pts: Mendez-Valdez, 20; Rebs: Hernández, 7 Asts: Stoll, 4		Pts: Balkman, 18; Rebs: Ubiles, 8 Asts: Barea, 4

CODE Dome, Guadalajara
Referees: Benito (BRA), Aracena (DOM), Fernandez (CUB)

October 27
13:00

Report

Argentina	79–78	Puerto Rico
Scoring by quarter: 24–22, 25–9, 13–22, 15–17
Pts: Sandes 15; Rebs: Sandes 8 Asts: Laprovittola 5		Pts: Barea 24; Rebs: Santiago 8 Asts: Barea, Berdiel 2

CODE Dome, Guadalajara
Referees: Rodriguez (VEN), Benito (BRA), Fernandez (CRC)

October 27
17:30

Report

Canada	65–79	Mexico
Scoring by quarter: 7–22, 14–17, 19–21–18, 19–25
Pts: Ward 20; Rebs: Klassen 9 Asts: Jones 5		Pts: Mariscal 16; Rebs: Real 15; Asts: Meza 6

CODE Dome, Guadalajara
Referees: Vazquez (URU), Stith (USA), Hayles (JAM)

October 28
10:30

Report

Puerto Rico	80–58	Canada
Scoring by quarter: 19–21, 9–21, 15–19, 15–19
Pts: Barea 25; Rebs: Balkman 8 Asts: Berdiel 8		Pts: Ward 15; Rebs: Phillip 6 Asts: Lieffers 3

CODE Dome, Guadalajara
Referees: Rodriguez (VEN), Aracena (DOM), Fernandez (CUB)

October 28
20:00

Report

Mexico	83–56	Argentina
Scoring by quarter: 18–15, 12–10, 25– 16, 28–15
Pts: Harris 22; Rebs: Real 14; Asts: Quintero 3		Pts: González 15; Rebs: Sandes 8 Asts: Laprovittola 4

CODE Dome, Guadalajara
Referees: Benito (BRA), Stith (USA), Vazquez (URU)

=== Group B ===
Pos	Team	Pld	W	L	PF	PA	PD	Pts	Qualification
1	United States	3	2	1	231	206	+25	5 (Note: United States 77–76 Dominican Republic)	Advance to Semifinals
2	Dominican Republic	3	2	1	231	194	+37	5	Advance to Semifinals
3	Brazil	3	1	2	206	238	−32	4 (Note: Brazil 80–71 Uruguay)	
4	Uruguay	3	1	2	214	244	−30	4	

Notes:

October 26
13:00

Report

Brazil	80–71	Uruguay
Scoring by quarter: 19–18, 17–17, 20–16, 24–20
Pts: Giovannoni 15; Rebs: Giovannoni 8 Asts: Santos 3		Pts: Fitipaldo 16; Rebs: Vázquez, Borsellino 5 Asts: Osimani 5

CODE Dome, Guadalajara
Referees: Fernandez (ARG), Fernandez (CRC), Vazquez (PUR)

October 26
17:30

Report

United States	77–76	Dominican Republic
Scoring by quarter: 20–20, 9–17, 25–20, 23–19
Pts: Thomas 15; Rebs: Thomas 16; Asts: Thomas, Dentmon 3		Pts: Martinez 31; Rebs: Martinez 10; Asts: Soliver 5

CODE Dome, Guadalajara
Referees: Dorame (MEX), Kenyon (CAN), Dueñas (COL)

October 27
17:30

Report

Uruguay	55–69	Dominican Republic
Scoring by quarter: 15–17, 19–19, 12–13, 9–20
Pts: Osimani 16; Rebs: Osimani 8 Asts: Osimani 4		Pts: Coronado Gil 17; Rebs: Martinez 21; Asts: Martinez 4

CODE Dome, Guadalajara
Referees: Aluz (ARG), Ramos (MEX), Vazquez (PUR)

October 27
20:00

Report

United States	88–77	Brazil
Scoring by quarter: 19–18, 13–20, 24–23, 32–16
Pts: Ahearn 21; Rebs: Thomas 12; Asts: Dentmon 6		Pts: Santos 16; Rebs: Becker, Giovannoni 7 Asts: Santos 7

CODE Dome, Guadalajara
Referees: Fernandez (ARG), Dorame (MEX), Donnelly (CAN)

October 28
13:00

Report

Dominican Republic	85–77	Brazil
Scoring by quarter: 20–19, 13–21, 23–29, 29–8
Pts: Martinez 22; Rebs: Martinez 9 Asts: Soliver 3		Pts: Machado 17; Rebs: da Rosa, Giovannoni 5 Asts: Machado, Santos 5

CODE Dome, Guadalajara
Referees: Vazquez (PUR), Aluz (ARG), Kenyon (CAN)

October 28
17:30

Report

United States	80–82	Uruguay
Scoring by quarter: 29–20, 24–22, 11–20, 16–20
Pts: Dyson 19; Rebs: Lyons 6 Asts: Sloan 3		Pts: Osimani 23; Rebs: Borsellino 8 Asts: Osimani 6

CODE Dome, Guadalajara
Referees: Donnelly (CAN), Dueñas (COL), Ramos (MEX)

== Final phase ==
Semi-finals
29 October – Guadalajara
Puerto Rico	85
Dominican Republic	77
29 October – Guadalajara
United States	55
Mexico	71

Final
30 October – Guadalajara
Puerto Rico	74
Mexico	72
Third place
30 October – Guadalajara
Dominican Republic	92
United States	94

=== Semifinals ===
October 29
13:00

Report

United States	55–71	Mexico
Scoring by quarter: 15–11, 14–23, 12–13, 14–24
Pts: Lyons 13; Rebs: Sloan 8 Asts: Dyson, Sloan 2		Pts: Harris 15; Rebs: Real 9 Asts: Stoll, Harris 4

CODE Dome, Guadalajara
Referees: Aluz (ARG), Rodriguez (VEN), Kenyon (CAN)

October 29
20:00

Report

Puerto Rico	85–77	Dominican Republic
Scoring by quarter: 23–18, 20–19, 23–16, 19–24
Pts: Barea 22; Rebs: Balkman 7 Asts: Barea 5		Pts: Martinez 20; Rebs: Martinez 8 Asts: Soliver 4

CODE Dome, Guadalajara
Referees: Benito (BRA), Donnelly (CAN), Fernandez (ARG)

=== Seventh place match ===
October 29
10:30

Report

Argentina	71–69	Uruguay
Scoring by quarter: 22–16, 18–12, 20–20, 11–21
Pts: Sandes 23; Rebs: Sandes 10; Asts: 3 players 3		Pts: Borsellino 15; Rebs: Borsellino 10; Asts: Osimani 8

CODE Dome, Guadalajara
Referees: Vazquez (PUR), Hayles (JAM), Fernandez (CRC)

=== Fifth place match ===
October 29
17:30

Report

Canada	56–74	Brazil
Scoring by quarter: 21–22, 15–14, 9–17, 11–21
Pts: Scrubb 10; Rebs: Sandes 12; Asts: Jones, Yu 2		Pts: Machado 19; Rebs: 3 players 6 Asts: Machado, Santos 3

CODE Dome, Guadalajara
Referees: Aracena (DOM), Fernandez (CUB), Dorame (MEX)

=== Bronze medal match ===
October 30
10:30

Report

Dominican Republic	92–94	United States
Scoring by quarter: 30–28, 21–17, 17–23, 24–26
Pts: Guzmán 25; Rebs: Guzmán, Martinez 9 Asts: Liz 7		Pts: Thomas 14; Rebs: Lewis 7 Asts: Dentmon 5

CODE Dome, Guadalajara
Referees: Vazquez (PUR), Vazquez (URU), Dorame (MEX)

=== Gold medal match ===
October 30
13:00

Report

Mexico	72–74	Puerto Rico
Scoring by quarter: 21–19, 14–16, 16–15, 21–24
Pts: Harris 18; Rebs: Real 7 Asts: Stoll 4		Pts: Balkman 28; Rebs: Balkman 12; Asts: Barea 8

CODE Dome, Guadalajara
Referees: Fernandez (ARG), Benito (BRA), Aracena (DOM)

== Awards ==
=== Topscorer ===
- (Dominican Republic) Jack Michael Martínez 106 pts (21.2 ppg)

2011 Pan American Games winners

Puerto Rico
2nd title

== Final standings ==
Rank	Team	Record
Gold medal	Puerto Rico	4–1
Silver medal	Mexico	3–2
Bronze medal	United States	3–2
4	Dominican Republic	2–3
5	Brazil	2–2
6	Canada	1–3
7	Argentina	2–2
8	Uruguay	1–3

== Medalists ==
Event	Gold	Silver	Bronze
Men's tournament	Puerto Rico; José Juan Barea; Carlos Arroyo; Filiberto Rivera; Carlos Strong; Samuel Villegas; Miguel "Ali" Berdiel; Edwin Ubiles; Gabriel Colón; Luis Villafañe; Renaldo Balkman; Manuel Narvaez; Daniel Santiago	Mexico; Paul Stoll; Jovan Harris; Pedro Meza; Christopher Hernandez; Adam Parada; Michael Strobbe; Victor Mariscal; Omar Quintero; Héctor Hernández; Orlando Méndez; Lorenzo Real; Jesús López	United States; Blake Ahearn; Brian Butch; Justin Dentmon; Jerome Dyson; Moses Ehambe; Marcus Lewis; Leo Lyons; Renaldo Major; Donald Sloan; Greg Stiemsma; Curtis Sumpter; Lance Thomas
