= Luis Villafañe =

Puerto Rican basketball player

Medal record

Men's basketball

Representing Puerto Rico

FIBA AmeriCup
Silver medal – second place	2009 Puerto Rico	
Silver medal – second place	2013 Venezuela	

Pan American Games
Gold medal – first place	2011 Mexico	

Centrobasket
Gold medal – first place	2008 Mexico	
Gold medal – first place	2010 Dominican Republic	

Central American and Caribbean Games
Gold medal – first place	2006 Colombia	

Luis Villafañe (born June 21, 1981 in San Juan, Puerto Rico) is a Puerto Rican professional basketball player who plays with Caciques de Humacao of the Puerto Rican Baloncesto Superior Nacional. He also is a member of the Puerto Rico National Basketball Team.

He made his debut for the senior Puerto Rican team at the 2008 Centrobasket tournament and was also selected to represent the nation in the FIBA Americas Championship 2009.

At the club level, he began his career with Cangrejeros de Santurce in 1999, and won four titles with them before moving to Grises de Humacao in 2006.

His signature skill is setting picks & protecting the paint. He is the best in Puerto Rico at it, that is why he is always among the first selections of the Puerto Rico men's national basketball team. He also continues to improve his offensive game.
