= Manolo Cintrón =

Puerto Rican basketball player

Personal information
- Born: January 4, 1963 (age 63) Ponce, Puerto Rico

Career information
- Playing career: 1981–1991
- Position: Point guard
- Coaching career: 2001–present

Career history

Playing
- 1981–1985: Atléticos de San Germán
- 1986: Gigantes de Carolina
- 1986–1987: Leones de Ponce
- 1987–1991: Gigantes de Carolina

Coaching
- 2001–2006: Explosivos de Moca
- 2002: Toros de Aragua
- 2002: Capitanes de Arecibo
- 2002: Vaqueros de Bayamón
- 2003: Capitanes de Arecibo
- 2003–2004: Explosivos de Moca
- 2004: Capitanes de Arecibo
- 2004–2006: Leones de Ponce
- 2007: Indios de Mayagüez
- 2008: Vaqueros de Bayamón
- 2008: Indios de Mayagüez
- 2008–2011: Halcones Rojos Veracruz
- 2016–2017: Garzas de Plata
- 2001–2006: Puerto Rico (Assistant coach)
- 2017–2019: Mineros de Zacatecas
- 2019–2024: Panteras de Aguascalientes
- 2024–2025: Santos del Potosí

Career highlights
- As coach: LNBP champion (2016)

Manuel "Manolo" Cintrón Vega (born January 4, 1963, in Ponce, Puerto Rico) is a former Puerto Rican professional basketball player, who for 11 seasons in the 1980s and early 1990s played with several teams in the National Basketball League in Puerto Rico., including the Atléticos de San Germán, the Leones de Ponce and the Gigantes de Carolina.

He is the former head coach of the Puerto Rico national basketball team, after being replaced in 2011 by Flor Melendez. He is the head coach of Veracruz´s "Halcones Rojos" in the Mexican Professional Basketball League.

In the past, he has been the head coach of: the "Explosivos de Moca" (PR, 2001–2002), the "Toros de Aragua Maracay" (Ven, 2002), the "Vaqueros de Bayamón" (PR, 2002), the "Capitanes de Arecibo" (PR, 2003), the "Explosivos de Moca" (PR, 2003–2004), the "Leones de Ponce" (PR, 2004–2006), the "Indios de Mayagüez" (PR, 2007) and the "Vaqueros de Bayamón" (PR, 2008).

As the assistant head coach of Puerto Rico from 2001 to 2006, he helped the team obtain gold at the 2001 Centrobasket. In 2007, he became Puerto Rico's head coach, taking over the work done by Julio Toro. He has managed to team to a gold medal at the 2008 Centrobasket, to silver medals at the 2007 Pan American Games and the 2009 FIBA Americas Championship and a bronze medal at the 2007 FIBA Americas Championship.
