= Kitwana Rhymer =

United States Virgin Islands basketball player

Kitwana Rhymer (born 22 May 1978 in Saint Thomas, U.S. Virgin Islands) is a United States Virgin Islands basketball player currently with La Villa Basketball of the La Vega League in the Dominican Republic.

Rhymer was a four-year player for the University of Massachusetts Amherst from 1998 to 2002. He graduated as the school's fifth-leading shot blocker and was the 2000-01 Atlantic 10 Conference Defensive Player of the Year.

== Professional career ==
Since beginning his professional career in 2002, Rhymer has bounced through nine teams on four continents. These include:

- (United States) Brooklyn Kings (USBL) (2002)
- (United States) Columbus Riverdragons (D-League) (2003)
- (United States) Westchester Wildfire (USBL) (2003–04)
- (United States) Great Lakes Storm (CBA) (2005)
- (New Zealand) Waikato Pistons (2006)
- (United States) Long Island Primetime (USBL) (2006)
- (Venezuela) Guaros de Lara (2006)
- (Netherlands) Hanzevast Capitals Groningen (2006–07)
- (Venezuela) Marinos de Anzoategui (2007–08)
- (Ukraine) Kryvbasbasket-Lux Kryvyi Rih (2008–09)
- (Romania) Gaz Metan Mediaş (2009–10)
- (Dominican Republic) La Villa Basketball La Vega League (2010–17)
- Brujos de Guayama, Baloncesto Superior Nacional, 1 game, 2017

== National team career ==
Kitwana Rhymer
Medal record

Men's basketball

Representing Virgin Islands

Centrobasket
Silver medal – second place	2006 Panama	
Silver medal – second place	2008 Mexico	

Rhymer is a long-time member of the Virgin Islands national basketball team. He played with the team at the 1999, 2003, 2006, and 2008 Centrobasket tournaments. The Virgin Islanders won the silver medal in each of the latter two Centrobasket tournaments. He also participated with the team at the last place Virgin Islanders at both the FIBA Americas Championship 2007 and FIBA Americas Championship 2009.
