= Ángel Daniel Vassallo =

Puerto Rican basketball player (born 1986)

No. 8 – Cangrejeros de Santurce
- Position: Small forward
- League: BSN

Personal information
- Born: April 21, 1986 (age 40) Toa Baja, Puerto Rico
- Listed height: 6 ft 6 in (1.98 m)
- Listed weight: 216 lb (98 kg)

Career information
- High school: Faith Christian Academy (Hurt, Virginia)
- College: Virginia Tech (2005–2009)
- NBA draft: 2009: undrafted
- Playing career: 2009–present

Career history
- 2009: Criollos de Caguas
- 2009–2010: Paris-Levallois
- 2010: ASVEL Basket
- 2011–2012: Mets de Guaynabo
- 2013–2014: Capitanes de Arecibo
- 2014–2015: Leones de Ponce
- 2015–2016: STB Le Havre
- 2016–2022: Leones de Ponce
- 2023–present: Cagrejeros de Santurce

Career highlights
- 2× BSN champion (2014, 2015); BSN Most Valuable Player (2016); 2× BSN All-Star (2009, 2016); BSN Rookie of the Year (2009); French League All-Star (2016); Second-team All-ACC (2008); Third-team All-ACC (2009)
Medals
Men's basketball
Representing Puerto Rico
FIBA AmeriCup
Silver medal – second place	2009 Puerto Rico
Centrobasket
Gold medal – first place	2008 Mexico
Gold medal – first place	2016 Panama
Central American and Caribbean Games
Gold medal – first place	2010 Puerto Rico

Ángel Daniel Vassallo Colón (born April 21, 1986) is a Puerto Rican professional basketball player for Cangrejeros de Santurce of the Baloncesto Superior Nacional (BSN). He has been a member of the Puerto Rico national basketball team since his teenage years, representing Puerto Rico in the 2003 FIBA World Championship for Junior Men and the 2005 FIBA U-21 World Championship. In 2008, Vassallo joined the senior team, playing at the 2008 Centrobasket, FIBA Americas Championship 2009 and 2010 FIBA World Championship.

After completing his high school education, he played for the Tigers of Hargrave Military Academy, reaching the preparatory national finals. Vassallo joined the NCAA playing for Virginia Tech, and throughout his college career received several recognitions, including two All-ACC second team inclusions. He finished his collegiate career fifth in the team's all-time scoring list. In his first Baloncesto Superior Nacional season, Vassallo averaged 25.6 points, 6.7 rebounds, and 4.3 assists per game for the Criollos de Caguas. He made his LNB Pro A debut for Paris-Levallois Basket, leading the team to the playoffs. Vassallo has been an All-Star player in both the BSN and the LNB.

== Early life ==
Vassallo was born in the municipality of Toa Baja, located in the northern coast of Puerto Rico's main island. He was the younger of two siblings, the other being Alexis Vassallo, born to Daniel Vassallo and Maria Colón. His father was a former professional player in the Baloncesto Superior Nacional, playing 17 seasons and becoming one of the league's all-time leading scorers.

In 2001, Vassallo moved to Virginia, where he continued his secondary education. He then enrolled in Faith Christian Academy in Hurt, VA, where he finished his high school education, being lettered in basketball and baseball. Vassallo played for the basketball team three years, during which time he was the lead scorer. Subsequently, he continued his preparatory education and played for the Tigers of Hargrave Military Academy. The team finished the season with a record of 28–1, advancing to the preparatory national championship game, losing to Laurinburg. In this game, Vassallo scored 19 points and recovered 14 rebounds.

== College career ==
Vassallo signed with University of Richmond twice and was denied admission both times despite meeting the requirements. The university surrendered his rights and Virginia Tech signed him, which compensated for Tony Dobbins' departure for Richmond years before.

=== 2005–2006 ===
Vassallo debuted for the Hokies in the 2005–06 season, playing in all of the team's games. Despite mostly serving as a bench player, he played at least 20 minutes in games against Mount St. Mary's and Marshall, scoring 18 collective points, 5 rebounds, 2 assists and one blocked shot. His first start was against Radford, recording 7 points, 3 rebounds and 3 assists. In a game against Western Carolina, Vassallo scored his first 3-point field goal. Vassallo scored season best in three-point baskets and rebounds against Morgan State. He started in a game at Bowling Green, but played less than ten minutes. Vassallo recorded his first double-double against Wake Forest, recording 29 points and 10 rebounds. He set season bests in six categories, shooting 11-of-19 2-point field goals, 4-of-5 3-point field goals, 3-of-3 free throws and earning four steals. The 29 points were the highest number scored by a Virginia Tech freshman in 27 years. Vassallo dished a season-high 7 assists against Virginia. He was included in the starting lineup in 8 out of the last 11 season games. At the Atlantic Coast Conference (ACC) Tournament he recorded 6 points and 3 rebounds against Virginia. In his first season, Vassallo led the Hokies in free throw percentage, he was also an Honorable Mention ACC All-Freshman and two-time ACC Rookie of the Week.

=== 2006–2007 ===
He continued serving as the Hokies backup small forward in the 2006–07 season. Vassallo scored 15 points in Virginia Tech's first home game. In 22 minutes against West Florida he scored 26 points, recovered 6 rebounds and recorded a block. He set a career-high in free throws against Southern Illinois. Serving as a starter against Richmond, Vassallo recorded 11 points and 6 rebounds. While serving as a backup he scored in double digits against UNC Greensboro, North Carolina and Miami. He recorded a double-double in his next start with 19 points and 10 rebounds. Serving as starter against Virginia, Vassallo scored 22 points and recovered 8 rebounds. He continued serving this role more frequently for the remainder of the season, starting against Miami, Virginia and Wake Forest in the ACC tournament. Virginia Tech was included in the NCAA Tournament. Vassallo started two games before the team was eliminated, recording 11 points, 12 rebounds and 3 assists.

=== 2007–2008 ===
He served as Virginia Tech's starting small forward throughout the 2007–08 season, starting in 35 games and leading the team in minutes played. Vassallo recorded more assists in this season than his freshman and sophomore years, tying his career-high once. He also set a career-high in blocks (3) against Liberty. His offensive role within the team was expanded, leading the Hokies in points per game (16.9), scoring over 10 points in 33 out of 35 games, including all against ACC competition. He recorded career highs in field goal attempts, reaching his 1,000th point and concluding the season with 1,174. His season-high was 27 against Georgia Tech. Vassallo was third among the Hokies in rebounds with an average of 4.6, he tied his career-high of 11 twice and recorded two double-doubles. When Virginia Tech won the Aeropostale Holiday Festival defeating St. John's, he was named the event's Most Valuable Player. Vassallo led the Hokies in scoring during the ACC Tournament and recorded 21 assists. After the season concluded, he received All-ACC, National Association of Basketball Coaches All-District and ACC Tournament Second-Team recognitions.

=== 2008–2009 ===
In his final season with the Hokies, Vassallo earned averages of 19.1 points per game, 2.6 assists per game and 6.2 rebounds per game. This marked a steady increase in points, rebounds, assists, steals, and blocks per game throughout his college career. Vassallo's served as the team's offensive leader. In a game against Wisconsin he scored 24 points during the second half, including six 3-point field goals, to finish with 30. In January 2009, Vassallo scored 29 points versus Virginia. He scored 15 consecutive points against Duke on February 28, 2010. On March 18, 2009, he recorded 33 points and 12 rebounds to surpass Zabian Dowdell in the list, becoming the Hokies's best offensive player since Bimbo Coles. Vassallo finished his NCAA career with 1,822 points, finishing fifth in Virginia Tech's history; he also set a record with 267 made 3-point shots. He was included in the All-ACC third team and NABC All-District second team. Vassallo's final amateur tournament was the Portsmouth Invitational Tournament, where he scored 21, 10 and 11 points in his team's third-place finish.

== Professional career ==
=== Baloncesto Superior Nacional ===
Vassallo debuted in the Baloncesto Superior Nacional on April 17, 2009, scoring 22 points against the Gigantes de Carolina. He closed his first week scoring 26 and 19 points in games versus the Vaqueros de Bayamón and Cangrejeros de Santurce, as well as capturing 15 rebounds in these two games. He closed the month of April scoring 17 and 19 points against the Atléticos de San Germán and Piratas de Quebradillas. On May 2, 2009, Vassallo scored 26 points and captured 7 rebounds in a game versus the Leones de Ponce, before taking a hiatus of three weeks while he participated in NBA training camps. Upon returning, he scored 34 points and recovered 7 rebounds in his first game. On May 30, 2009, Vassallo scored 53 points versus the Indios de Mayagüez, recording the highest number of points in his life and tying the career-high of his father's BSN career. He closed this week scoring 36 points and 9 rebounds against Ponce. From June 10 to 16, Vassallo scored 30, 14, 18 and 26 points in games against the Mets de Guaynabo, Mayagüez, Bayamón and Carolina, capturing 32 rebounds. In his last two games of the season, Vassallo scored 48 points and recovered 12 rebounds in games versus the Grises de Humacao and Capitanes de Arecibo. In his first BSN All-Star Game, he recorded 11 points and 3 rebounds. Since he only played 15 games for the Criollos, Vassallo was not included in the league's leaderboards however, during these games he recorded a higher average than all of the players included in the boards, with 25.6 points per game, in contrast to the league's scoring champion, Jesse Pellot Rosa, who had 23.48 points per game. Despite the Criollos' elimination, Vassallo received 25 out of 28 votes in the "Rookie of the Year" elections. The Criollos recessed prior to the 2010 BSN season and the Gallitos de Isabela earned the rights of his contract. Vassallo joined the team during the playoffs, but the team was swept by the Vaqueros in their series. His season average were 25.6 points per game and 6.7 rebounds per game. In 2014, he won sixth man of the year and championship with Leones de Ponce.

=== Ligue Nationale de Basketball ===
On October 3, 2009, Vassallo debuted in the Ligue Nationale de Basketball for Paris-Levallois Basket scoring 14 points and 7 rebounds. On the second date against Union Poitiers Basket 86, he improved to 21 points and 10 rebounds. In his third game, Vassallo scored 14 of his 22 points in the last quarter and recovered 6 rebounds. This pattern continued on Paris' first game against JDA Dijon, where he had 19 points and 6 rebounds. On October 31, 2009, Vassallo recorded his second double-double, but the team lost. A week later he recorded his worst game of the season in a 61–75 loss to Le Mans Sarthe Basket. Paris managed to win its next game against ASVEL Lyon-Villeurbanne, with Vassallo scoring 24 points. On November 24, 2009, he had perfect 2-point field goal and free throw percentages, but the team lost by 14 points to JA Vichy. Four days later Vassallo scored 29 and recovered 6 rebounds against SPO Rouen Basket. In his first game of December, he scored 7 out of eleven field goal attempts in a victory over Hyères-Toulon Var Basket. In his last two games of the year, Vassallo recorded 18 and 21 points.

In the LNB All-Star Game, Vassallo played for the Foreign-Star team, leading all scorers with 22 points and 7 rebounds. Paris opened the second half of the season with a win over Chorale Roanne Basket and two losses against Strasbourg IG and Entente Orléanaise. Vassallo continued scoring in double figures during this period, recording 14, 10 and 18 points. From this point onwards, Paris would play in rematches against the team faced during the early part of the first half. During the following weeks, the team defeated Poitiers and Dijon, but lost against SLUC Nancy and ÉS Chalon-sur-Saône. Vassallo contributed 14, 13, 11 and 19 points and recovered 18 collective rebounds. On February 26, 2010, Le Mans was able to limit him to 5 field goal attempts and 1 rebound, but he was able to record a season-high 6 assists. In victories over ASVEL, Rouen and Hyères-Toulon, Vassallo scored 21, 29 and 15 points and recovered 14 rebounds. In April he entered a brief offensive slump, only being successful in 13 out of 34 field-goal attempts in games against Cholet Basket and STB Le Havre. Vassallo recovered by scoring 21, 29 and 12 points. Paris advanced to the playoffs, being placed in a bracket against Le Mans. The team lost both games, but Vassallo scored 40 points and recovered 7 rebounds. During the off-season, Vassallo announced that he had been invited to the 2010 NBA Summer League and would also participate in a Toronto Raptors try-out, preventing his participation in the 2010 Centrobasket. However, prior to the event's inauguration, he signed a contract with ASVEL.

== National team career ==
During his youth, Vassallo was part of Puerto Rico's Junior National Team. His first major competition with this team was the 2003 FIBA World Championship for Junior Men, where he averaged 8 points and 6 rebounds per game. At the 2005 FIBA U21 World Championship for Men, Vassallo recorded 8.6 points and 4 rebounds per game. His first participation with the senior Puerto Rico national basketball team was at the 2008 Centrobasket, where he served as the shooting guard backup behind Carmelo Lee. He recorded 6 points and 1.2 per game in limited time, while the team won the gold medal. He returned to this role at the 2009 Marchand Continental Cup, an exhibition tournament, where he improved to 10 points and 3 rebounds. Next was the 2009 FIBA Americas Championship for Men, a qualificatory tournament for the 2010 FIBA World Championship. There Vassallo had statistics of 7.3 points and 3.4 rebounds, including a perfect game against Brasil, where he scored 8 of 8 field goal attempts and a free throw attempt. Puerto Rico won the silver medal and qualified.

Vassallo returned to the team in 2010, now being rotated between the small forward and shooting guard positions. In order to improve his defense and reflexes, he guarded point guard Carlos Arroyo during team practices. Vassallo participated in the 2010 Central American and Caribbean Games, where Puerto Rico won the gold medal undefeated. In this tournament he scored 80% of his 2-point field goal attempts, for averages of 12 points and 4 rebounds per game. Subsequently, the team participated in multiple preparatory exhibition games, including a series against the top-ranked team in the world, Argentina, where Vassallo scored 26 points in the final of three contests.

== Career stats ==
League	Games	Points scored	Total assists	Total rebounds	Points Per Game Average	Assists Per Game Average	Rebounds Per Game Average
NCAA Division I	133	1,822	222	581	13.7	1.7	4.4
Baloncesto Superior Nacional	169	3,017	401	873	17.9	2.4	5.2
Ligue Nationale de Basketball	31	552	81	134	17.8	2.6	4.3

== See also ==
- List of Puerto Ricans
