= Phil Jones (basketball) =

United States Virgin Islands basketball player

Personal information
- Born: September 2, 1985 (age 39); Nashville, Tennessee, U.S.
- Listed height: 6 ft 11 in (2.11 m)
- Listed weight: 259 lb (117 kg)

Career information
- High school: Laurinburg Institute (Laurinburg, North Carolina)
- College: Charlotte (2007–2011)
- NBA draft: 2011: undrafted
- Playing career: 2011–2014
- Position: Power forward / center

Career history
- 2011: Atlético Aguada
- 2012: U-Mobitelco Cluj-Napoca
- 2012–2013: Los Angeles D-Fenders
- 2014: Island Storm

Phillip Michael Jones (born September 2, 1985) is a Virgin Islands professional basketball player. He played college basketball at the University of North Carolina at Charlotte and has played internationally for the U.S. Virgin Islands national basketball team. Born in Nashville, Tennessee, Jones spent part of his childhood growing up in the Virgin Islands.

Jones committed to the 49ers out of Laurinburg Prep School in North Carolina after he spent a year at the school after graduating from high school in Philadelphia. Ranked as a top 100 recruit by several publications, he averaged 19 points, 10.2 rebounds, and 5.3 blocks per game while leading the school to the Prep National Championship.

As a first-year sophomore for the 49ers, he averaged 3.3 points and 2.9 rebounds a game while playing 13.4 minutes per game off the bench to the 49ers. He improved in his junior season, 2008–09, averaging 7.3 points, 4 rebounds, and 1.4 blocks per game for the team.

Jones competed on the U.S. Virgin Islands national basketball team for the first time at the FIBA Americas Championship 2009. He averaged 8.5 points and 4.8 rebounds per game in four games for the team, including a team-high 18 points and seven rebounds in a preliminary round loss to Puerto Rico.
