= Cuthbert Victor =

US Virgin Islands basketball player

Free agent
- Position: Power forward

Personal information
- Born: January 30, 1983 (age 43) Saint Croix, U.S. Virgin Islands
- Listed height: 6 ft 5 in (1.96 m)
- Listed weight: 215 lb (98 kg)

Career information
- High school: St. Joseph (U.S. Virgin Islands)
- College: Murray State (2000–2004)
- NBA draft: 2004: undrafted
- Playing career: 2004–present

Career history
- 2004–2005: CB Plasencia
- 2005–2006: CB Tarragona
- 2006–2007: Cantabria Baloncesto
- 2007–2008: CAI Zaragoza
- 2008–2009: Melilla Baloncesto
- 2009–2011: Menorca Bàsquet
- 2011–2012: Spartak Primorye
- 2012–2013: Le Mans
- 2013–2015: Krasny Oktyabr
- 2015–2016: Ulsan Mobis Phoebus
- 2016: Capitanes de Arecibo
- 2016–2017: Incheon ET Land Elephants

Career highlights
- VTB United League steals leader (2014); OVC Player of the Year (2004)
Medals
Men's basketball
Representing Virgin Islands
Centrobasket
Silver medal – second place	2006 Panama
Silver medal – second place	2008 Mexico
FIBA CBC Championship
Silver medal – second place	2006 Jamaica
Gold medal – first place	2011 Bahamas
Gold medal – first place	2015 British Virgin Islands

Cuthbert Victor (born January 30, 1983) is a U.S. Virgin Islander professional basketball player who last played for the Incheon ET Land Elephants of the Korean Basketball League. Nicknamed the "Greek God" by Virgin Island fans, he is a long-time member of the U.S. Virgin Islands national basketball team.

== College career ==
Victor played college basketball at Murray State University. In his four years there, he established himself as a dominant force for the Racers. Despite flying under the radar, he has been called one of the best players in Murray State Racer history, and was once named CollegehoopsNet Unsung Player of the week.

Victor graduated as the all-time Racer leader in career blocks (160). He also ranks in the top 6 on the school's career list in rebounds, field goal percentage, and steals, and is 14th in career points. During his time at the university, he led the team to the NCAA Tournament twice, in 2002 and 2004. After a senior season in which he averaged 14.6 points and 10.2 rebounds per game, he was named Ohio Valley Conference Player of the Year.

== Professional career ==
After graduating, Victor began his career in Spain for CAI Zaragoza for the 2004–05 season. In the 2008–09 season with Melilla, he averaged 14 points and 6.3 rebounds per game in 37 games for the team and was a candidate for League MVP. On July 28, 2009, he signed with another Spanish team, Menorca Bàsquet, for the 2009–10 season; where with the team and his help, achieved ending in second place and go to ACB league, one of the best leagues around the world. In August 2011 he signed with Spartak Primorye in Russia.

== National team career ==
Victor is a long-time member of the U.S. Virgin Islands national basketball team. He has been with the team since 1999 and competed for the team at the 2003, 2007, and FIBA Americas Championship 2009. He was the fourth leading overall scorer at the 2008 Centrobasket tournament and top overall rebounder while averaging 21.8 points and 10 rebounds per game for the Virgin Islands. He was also the team's leading scorer with 16.6 points per game at the 2006 Centrobasket. The Virgin Islands won the silver medal at both tournaments.
