= Jermaine Anderson (basketball) =

Canadian professional basketball player

Personal information
- Born: February 8, 1983 (age 43) Toronto, Ontario
- Listed height: 6 ft 2 in (1.88 m)
- Listed weight: 180 lb (82 kg)

Career information
- High school: Eastern Commerce Collegiate Institute (Toronto, Ontario)
- College: Fordham (2002–2006)
- NBA draft: 2006: undrafted
- Playing career: 2006–2017
- Position: Point guard

Career history
- 2006: Brose Baskets
- 2007: Polpak Świecie
- 2007–2008: Halifax Rainmen
- 2008–2009: Walter Tigers Tübingen
- 2009–2010: Cedevita Zagreb
- 2010–2011: Triumph Lyubertsy
- 2011: Panionios
- 2011–2012: Budućnost Podgorica
- 2012: Cibona Zagreb
- 2012–2013: New Yorker Phantoms Braunschweig
- 2013–2015: TBB Trier
- 2015–2016: Baloncesto Sevilla
- 2016: Basketball Löwen Braunschweig
- 2016–2017: Châlons-Reims
- 2017: Mornar Bar
- 2017: Châlons-Reims

Career highlights
- Montenegrin League champion (2012); Montenegrin Cup winner (2012)

Jermaine Anderson (born February 8, 1983) is a Canadian retired professional basketball player who is currently General Manager and Vice President of Basketball Operations for the Brampton Honey Badgers of the CEBL. He is a veteran member of the Canadian national basketball team.

== High school and college ==
Anderson attended Eastern Commerce Collegiate Institute in Toronto, playing with the school's basketball team until graduating in the class of 2001.

Anderson attended Fordham University from the 2002–03 season through to 2005–06, where, as a senior, he started all 32 games for the Rams averaging 15.6 points, 3.7 rebounds and 3.4 assists per game.

== Professional career ==
On August 2, 2013, he signed a one-year deal with TBB Trier. On August 11, 2014, he re-signed with Trier for one more season.

On August 28, 2015, he signed with Baloncesto Sevilla of the Spanish Liga ACB. On January 19, 2016, he parted ways with Sevilla after appearing in 15 games. On February 2, 2016, he returned to his former team Basketball Löwen Braunschweig for the rest of the season.

On August 18, 2016, Anderson signed with the French team Châlons-Reims. On January 19, 2017, he left Châlons-Reims and signed with Montenegrin club Mornar Bar. He left Mornar after appearing in six games. In April 2017, he returned to Châlons-Reims for the rest of the season.

== National team career ==
Anderson has been a member of Canada's senior men's basketball team since 2004, and has played in over 75 international games with the team.

Anderson participated in the 2009 FIBA Americas Championship, he helped lead Canada to a 4th-place finish losing in the 3rd place game to Argentina. The 88–73 loss to Argentina was also Anderson's best game of the tournament scoring 19 points, 11 assists and 4 rebounds. Anderson was voted to the all-tournament third team along with teammate Joel Anthony.
