= Jesus Centeno =

Venezuelan basketball player (born 1985)

Medal record

Men's basketball

Representing Venezuela

FIBA South American Championship
Bronze medal – third place	2008 Puerto Montt	
Gold medal – first place	2014 Isla Margarita	

Jesus Humberto Centeno Bolivar (born December 27, 1985, in Maracay, Venezuela) is a Venezuelan professional basketball player currently signed with Venezuelan team Diablos de Miranda.

Centeno was a prolific junior team member for the Venezuela national basketball team. He played for the U-19 team at the 2003 FIBA Under-19 World Championship, averaging 10.6 points and 2.4 assists per game for the ninth placed Venezuelans. He also competed for the Under-21 team at the 2004 Americas Tournament. He made his debut for the senior team in qualifying for the FIBA Americas Championship 2009. After the Venezuelans qualified, he was also named to the team that would represent the country in the tournament.
