= Tyler Kepkay =

Canadian basketball player

Personal information
- Born: June 19, 1987 (age 39) Vancouver, British Columbia
- Listed height: 6 ft 0 in (1.83 m)
- Listed weight: 185 lb (84 kg)

Career information
- High school: Handsworth (North Vancouver, British Columbia)
- College: College of Eastern Utah (2005–2007); Utah (2007–2009)
- NBA draft: 2009: undrafted
- Position: Guard

Career history
- 2009–2010: ETB Wohnbau Baskets
- 2010–2011: Gießen 46ers
- 2011–2012: Science City Jena
- 2012: Artland Dragons
- 2013-2025: Winling Basketball Club

Tyler Kepkay (born June 19, 1987) is a Canadian professional basketball player, who last played for the Winling Basketball Club in Hong Kong. He is a veteran member of the Canadian national basketball team.

== College career ==
Kepkay initially attended the College of Eastern Utah in Price, Utah. At the junior college school, he led the nation in scoring his sophomore season en route to being named First Team Junior College All-America. Following his two years of junior college, he committed to the University of Utah for his last two years of eligibility. In his first season with the Utes, he played in all 33 games, starting 26 of them, while averaging 7.5 points and 2.1 assists per game. In the 2008–09 season, he averaged 10.3 points per game for the Utes in helping the team to a 24–9 record and a berth in the 2009 NCAA Men's Division I Basketball Tournament. At the tournament, he scored a team-high 19 points in a first round loss to the University of Arizona.

== National team career ==
Kepkay first played for the Canada national basketball team at the FIBA World Olympic Qualifying Tournament for Men 2008 while seeing limited action off the bench for the Canadians. He also participated with the team at the FIBA Americas Championship 2009.
