= Virgin Islands men's national basketball team =

Men's national basketball team

Virgin Islands (United States Virgin Islands)
- FIBA ranking: 84th NR (1 September 2026)
- Joined FIBA: 1964
- FIBA zone: FIBA Americas
- National federation: Virgin Islands Basketball Federation
- Coach: Edniesha Curry

FIBA AmeriCup
- Appearances: 6
- Medals: None
Home	Away

The Virgin Islands men's national basketball team is the basketball team which represents the United States Virgin Islands in men's international basketball competitions. The team assembles intermittently, to qualify for and compete in competitions such as the FIBA AmeriCup, the Central American and Caribbean Games, and the Pan American Games.

On 15 August 2022, the VI basketball federation appointed former NBA assistant coach Edniesha Curry as the team's head coach. She has led the team in its most recent major international competitions, the 2022 FIBA AmeriCup (and qualifiers for the 2025 edition), the 2024 Pre-Olympic Qualifiers, and the 2023 Central American and Caribbean Games.

== Tournament record ==
=== Pan American Games ===
- 1971 – 11th place
- 1975 – 10th place
- 1979 – 10th place
- 1987 – 10th place
- 2007 – 8th place

=== FIBA AmeriCup ===
- 2001 – 7th place
- 2003 – 10th place
- 2007 – 10th place
- 2009 – 10th place
- 2017 – 4th place
- 2022 – 12th place

=== Central American Championship ===
- 1997 – 5th place
- 1999 – 6th place
- 2001 – 4th place
- 2003 – 4th place
- 2006 – 2nd place
- 2008 – 2nd place
- 2010 – 9th place
- 2012 – 7th place
- 2014 – 6th place

=== FIBA CBC Championship ===
- 2000 – 2nd place
- 2002 – 1st place
- 2004 – 6th place
- 2006 – 2nd place
- 2011 – 1st place
- 2014 – 3rd place
- 2015 – 1st place

== Players ==
=== Current roster ===
Roster for the 2022 FIBA AmeriCup.

Virgin Islands men's national basketball team – 2022 FIBA AmeriCup roster
Players
Coaches

Pos.	No.	Name	Age – Date of birth	Height	Club	Ctr.
G	0	Amir Nesbitt	21 – 23 July 2001	1.82 m (6 ft 0 in)	Hampton Pirates	(United States)
G	4	Georgio Milligan	32 – 26 July 1990	1.87 m (6 ft 2 in)	União Corinthians	(Brazil)
SF	5	Jahsean Corbett	20 – 1 July 2002	1.98 m (6 ft 6 in)	Chicago State Cougars	(United States)
F	7	Shaquan Jules	22 – 23 September 1999	2.01 m (6 ft 7 in)	Radford Highlanders	(United States)
PG	8	Trivante Bloodman	29 – 26 December 1992	1.85 m (6 ft 1 in)	Mississippi State Bulldogs	(United States)
F	11	Ivan Aska (C)	32 – 26 June 1990	2.00 m (6 ft 7 in)	DEAC	(Hungary)
C	13	Rakeem Christmas	30 – 1 December 1991	2.05 m (6 ft 9 in)	Yulon Luxgen	(Chinese Taipei)
F	14	Romani Hansen	25 – 4 February 1997	2.03 m (6 ft 8 in)	Starwings Basket Regio Basel	(Switzerland)
F	20	Miguel López	22 – 13 September 1999	1.93 m (6 ft 4 in)	Whitworth University	(United States)
G	22	Earl Baker	22 – 26 October 1999	1.80 m (5 ft 11 in)	Slippery Rock University	(United States)

Head coach

- (United States) Edniesha Curry

Assistant coach(es)

- (Guinea) Malick Kone

Legend

- (C) Team captain
- Club – describes last
  club before the tournament
- Age – describes age
  on September 2, 2022

=== Past roster ===
The roster for the 2017 FIBA AmeriCup.

U.S. Virgin Islands – 2017 AmeriCup roster
Players
Coaches

Pos.	No.	Name	Age – Date of birth	Height	Club	Ctr.
PG	4	Angel Rivera	22 – 17 March 1995	1.70 m (5 ft 7 in)	Stetson Hatters	(United States)
SG	5	Stephaun Adams	20 – 20 November 1996	1.93 m (6 ft 4 in)	Tennessee Tech Golden Eagles	(United States)
PG	6	Walter Hodge	30 – 21 September 1986	1.83 m (6 ft 0 in)	Homenetmen Beirut BC	(Lebanon)
SF	7	Cuthbert Victor	34 – 30 January 1983	1.97 m (6 ft 6 in)	ET Land	(South Korea)
PF	8	Justin Gray	21 – 15 December 1995	2.00 m (6 ft 7 in)	Texas Tech Red Raiders	(United States)
SG	9	Jonathan Gray	26 – 4 May 1991	1.93 m (6 ft 4 in)	Valle d'Itria Basket Martina Franca	(Italy)
SG	10	Jahmia Simmons	19 – 17 June 1998	1.94 m (6 ft 4 in)	North Texas Mean Green	(United States)
SG	11	Deon Edwin	25 – 9 August 1992	1.93 m (6 ft 4 in)	Kyiv-Basket	(Ukraine)
SF	12	Khalid Hart	22 – 13 September 1994	1.92 m (6 ft 4 in)	Marist Red Foxes	(United States)
SF	13	Rashawn Fredericks	20 – 12 November 1996	1.95 m (6 ft 5 in)	Motlow State Bucks	(United States)
C	14	Phillip Jones	31 – 2 September 1985	2.11 m (6 ft 11 in)	Atléticos de San Germán	(Puerto Rico)
PF	15	Javier Martínez	24 – 16 July 1993	1.98 m (6 ft 6 in)	Tennessee-Martin Skyhawks	(United States)

Head coach

- (United States) Sam Mitchell

Assistant coach(es)

- (United States) Jareem Dowling
- (United States) Michael Evans

Legend

- (C) Team captain
- Club – describes current club
- Age – describes age
  on August 25, 2017

=== Other players ===
U.S. Virgin Islands roster
Players
Coaches

Pos.	No.	Name	Age – Date of birth	Height	Club	Ctr.
PG		Kemba Walker	28 – May 8, 1990	6 ft 1 in (1.85 m)	Charlotte Hornets	(United States)
SG		Marcus Georges-Hunt	24 – March 28, 1994	6 ft 5 in (1.96 m)	Maine Red Claws	(United States)
SF		Royce O'Neale	25 – June 5, 1993	6 ft 6 in (1.98 m)	Utah Jazz	(United States)
PF		John Collins	21 – September 23, 1997	6 ft 10 in (2.08 m)	Atlanta Hawks	(United States)
F/C		Ivan Aska	28 – June 26, 1990	6 ft 8 in (2.03 m)	Kolossos Rodou	(Greece)
SF		Justin Gray	22 – December 15, 1995	6 ft 6 in (1.98 m)	Bristol Flyers	(United Kingdom)
F/C		Nicolas Claxton	19 – April 17, 1999	6 ft 11 in (2.11 m)	Georgia Bulldogs	(United States)
C		Ahsan Asadullah	20 – June 5, 1998	6 ft 8 in (2.03 m)	Lipscomb Bisons	(United States)

- Jason Edwin (196–G/F–81)
- Frank Elegar (206–C–86)
- Akeem Francis (198–F–83)
- Kaylen Gregory (190–G/F–86)
- Jameel Heywood (198–F–77)
- Steven Hodge (180–G–80)
- Carl Krauser (188–G–81)
- Omari Peterkin (203–F/C–83)
- Kitwana Rhymer (208–C–78)
- Ja Ja Richards (207–C–75)
- Kevin Sheppard (182–G–79)

=== Head coach position ===
- (United States) Milton Barnes (2010–2014)
- (United States) Sam Mitchell (2015–2018)
- (Puerto Rico) William Colón (2018–present)
