= 1999 Centrobasket =

This page shows the results of the 1999 Men's Central American and Caribbean Basketball Championship, also known as the 1999 Centrobasket, which was held in the city of Havana, Cuba from May 4 to May 9, 1999. The top four teams qualified for the 1999 Pan American Tournament, scheduled for July 14 to July 25 at the Roberto Clemente Coliseum in San Juan, Puerto Rico.

== Competing nations ==
Group A	Group B
Belize; Costa Rica; Cuba; Dominican Republic	Mexico; Panama; Puerto Rico; Virgin Islands

== Preliminary round ==
Group A	Pts	Pld	W	L	PF	PA	Diff
Cuba	6	3	3	0	244	197	+47
Dominican Republic	5	3	2	1	218	175	+43
Costa Rica	4	3	1	2	202	257	–55
Belize	3	3	0	3	194	229	–35

- 1999-05-04

Dominican Republic	68 – 52	Belize
Cuba	77 – 65	Costa Rica

- 1999-05-05

Dominican Republic	84 – 53	Costa Rica
Belize	66 – 77	Cuba

- 1999-05-06

Belize	76 – 84	Costa Rica
Cuba	70 – 66	Dominican Republic

Group B	Pts	Pld	W	L	PF	PA	Diff
Puerto Rico	6	3	3	0	261	194	+67
Panama	5	3	2	1	238	224	+14
Virgin Islands	4	3	1	2	198	234	–36
Mexico	3	3	0	3	172	217	–45

- 1999-05-04

Panama	64 – 52	Mexico
Puerto Rico	80 – 54	Virgin Islands

- 1999-05-05

Panama	90 – 72	Virgin Islands
Puerto Rico	81 – 56	Mexico

- 1999-05-06

Puerto Rico	100 – 84	Panama
Virgin Islands	72 – 64	Mexico

== Consolidation Round ==
- 1999-05-08 — 5th/8th place

Mexico	59 – 50	Costa Rica
Virgin Islands	82 – 67	Belize

- 1999-05-08 — 1st/4th place

Puerto Rico	67 – 66	Dominican Republic
Cuba	72 – 64	Panama

== Final round ==
- 1999-05-09 — 7th/8th place

Belize	63 – 61	Costa Rica

- 1999-05-09 — 5th/6th place

Mexico	69 – 60	Virgin Islands

- 1999-05-09 — 3rd/4th place

Dominican Republic	86 – 74	Panama

- 1999-05-09 — 1st/2nd place

Cuba	67 – 63	Puerto Rico

== Final ranking ==
1. Cuba

2. Puerto Rico

3. Dominican Republic

4. Panama

5. Mexico

6. Virgin Islands

7. Belize

8. Costa Rica

1999 Men's Centrobasket winners

Cuba
Fourth title
