= 2008 Centrobasket =

Sporting event

2008 FIBA Centrobasket
21st Central American and Caribbean Basketball Championship

Tournament details
- Host country: Mexico
- Dates: August 26 – August 31
- Teams: 8 (from 32 federations)
- Venues: 2 (in 2 host cities)

Final positions
- Champions: Puerto Rico (9th title)

Tournament statistics
- MVP: (Puerto Rico) José Juan Barea

Official website
- FIBA Americas

The 2008 Men's Central American and Caribbean Basketball Championship, also known as 2008 Centrobasket, was hosted in Cancún and Chetumal, Mexico. The four semifinalists of this edition qualified for the 2009 FIBA Americas championship.

== First phase ==
=== Group A ===
| Team | Pld | W | L | PF | PA | PD | Pts | Tie-Break |
|---|---|---|---|---|---|---|---|---|
| Virgin Islands | 3 | 2 | 1 | 242 | 215 | +27 | 5 | +5 |
| Dominican Republic | 3 | 2 | 1 | 258 | 194 | +64 | 5 | -1 |
| Mexico | 3 | 2 | 1 | 237 | 185 | +52 | 5 | -4 |
| El Salvador | 3 | 0 | 3 | 143 | 286 | -143 | 3 | |

August 27
18:30

Game 2

| Mexico | 92–36 | El Salvador |
Scoring by quarter: 20-16, 16-3, 26-12, 30-5
| Pts: Castillo 20; Rebs: Benítez 8 Asts: Hernández 4 | | Pts: Molina 6 Rebs: three players 4 Asts: four players 1 |

Palacio de los Deportes, Chetumal

August 27
21:00

Game 4

| Virgin Islands | 83–74 | Dominican Republic |
Scoring by quarter: 16-18, 17-20, 25-18, 25-18
| Pts: Sheppard 25; Rebs: Edwin, Victor 8 Asts: Edwin, White 3 | | Pts: Horford 21; Rebs: Horford 9 Asts: Arias 3 |

Palacio de los Deportes, Chetumal

August 28
18:30

Game 5

| Dominican Republic | 106–41 | El Salvador |
Scoring by quarter: 33-8, 18-11, 31-16, 24-6
| Pts: Francisco García 22; Rebs: Jack Michael Martinez 10; Asts: Jack Michael Martinez 4 | | Pts: Jose Araujo 14; Rebs: 4 players 3 Asts: Jose Miguel Baños 2 |

Palacio de los Deportes, Chetumal

August 28
21:00

Game 7

| Virgin Islands | 71–75 | Mexico |
Scoring by quarter: 23-22, 7-19, 23-17, 18-17
| Pts: Cuthbert Victor 24; Rebs: Kitwana Rhymer 9 Asts: Calvert White 2 | | Pts: Jesus Benitez 18; Rebs: Gustavo Ayon 8 Asts: Gustavo Ayon 4 |

Palacio de los Deportes, Chetumal

August 29
16:00

Game 9

| El Salvador | 66–88 | Virgin Islands |
Scoring by quarter: 7-26, 25-12, 15-23, 19-20
| Pts: Oscar Rivera & Carlos Alas 17; Rebs: Oscar Rivera 6 Asts: Oscar Rivera 3 | | Pts: Kevin Sheppard 20; Rebs: Cuthbert Victor 8 Asts: Cuthbert Victor 6 |

Palacio de los Deportes, Chetumal

August 29
18:30

Game 12

| Mexico | 70–78 | Dominican Republic |
Scoring by quarter: 19-16, 14-23, 20-26, 17-13
| Pts: Omar Quintero 15; Rebs: Gustavo Ayon 6 Asts: Horacio Llamas 4 | | Pts: Al Horford 24; Rebs: Jack Michael Martinez 13; Asts: Francisco García 3 |

Palacio de los Deportes, Chetumal

=== Group B ===
| Team | Pld | W | L | PF | PA | PD | Pts |
|---|---|---|---|---|---|---|---|
| Puerto Rico | 3 | 3 | 0 | 295 | 260 | +35 | 6 |
| Cuba | 3 | 2 | 1 | 285 | 265 | +20 | 5 |
| Panama | 3 | 1 | 2 | 278 | 269 | +9 | 4 |
| Costa Rica | 3 | 0 | 3 | 206 | 270 | -64 | 3 |

August 27
18:00

Game 1

| Cuba | 101–85 | Panama |
Scoring by quarter: 27-26, 16-14, 29-19, 29-26
| Pts: Silvestre Hernández 41; Rebs: Yoan Haiti 7 Asts: Michael Guerra 5 | | Pts: Danilo Pinnock 33; Rebs: Orlando Ortega 6 Asts: Jair Peralta 7 |

Kuchil Baxal Gymnasium, Cancún

August 27
21:00

Game 3

| Puerto Rico | 85–68 | Costa Rica |
Scoring by quarter: 20-14, 16-13, 24-18, 25-23
| Pts: Jose Juan Barea 16; Rebs: Angelo Reyes 11; Asts: Carlos Arroyo 8 | | Pts: Henry Martinez & Jaffry Francisco 12; Rebs: Daniel Simmons 9 Asts: Alonso Sanchez 2 |

Kuchil Baxal Gymnasium, Cancún

August 28
18:30

Game 6

| Panama | 91–61 | Costa Rica |
Scoring by quarter: 25-21, 17-9, 25-17, 23-14
| Pts: Maximiliano Gomez 15; Rebs: Reyjavick DeGracia 15; Asts: Jair Peralta 7 | | Pts: Henry Martinez 15; Rebs: David Richards 8 Asts: Jaffry Spencer 3 |

Kuchil Baxal Gymnasium, Cancún

August 28
21:00

Game 8

| Cuba | 90–103 | Puerto Rico |
Scoring by quarter: 21-34, 21-28, 20-19, 28-22
| Pts: Silvestre Hernandez 25; Rebs: Michael Guerra 6 Asts: Yudniel Perez 3 | | Pts: Alexander Falcon & Jose Juan Barea 19; Rebs: Angelo Reyes (basketball) 6 Asts: Jose Juan Barea 15 |

Kuchil Baxal Gymnasium, Cancún

August 29
18:30

Game 10

| Costa Rica | 77–94 | Cuba |
Scoring by quarter: 20-25, 22-27, 17-21, 18-21
| Pts: Henry Martinez & David Carnegie 17; Rebs: David Carnegie 14; Asts: Henry Martinez & Cristian Chavarria 3 | | Pts: Allens Jemmontt 25; Rebs: Geoffrei Silvestre 8 Asts: Allens Jemmontt 4 |

Kuchil Baxal Gymnasium, Cancún

August 29
21:00

Game 11

| Puerto Rico | 107–102 | Panama |
Scoring by quarter: 35-22, 22-28, 24-21, 26-31
| Pts: José Juan Barea 31; Rebs: Angelo Reyes 8 Asts: Filiberto Rivera 5 | | Pts: Danilo Pinnock 39; Rebs: Danilo Pinnock 6 Asts: Jair Peralta & Joel Muñoz 5 |

Kuchil Baxal Gymnasium, Cancún

== Bracket ==
Semi-finals
August 30 - 17:30 p.m.
Virgin Islands | 78
Cuba | 61
August 30 - 20:00 p.m.
Puerto Rico | 76
Dominican Republic | 74

Final
August 31 - 20:30 p.m.
Virgin Islands | 70
Puerto Rico | 87
Third place
August 31 - 17:30 p.m.
Cuba | 74
Dominican Republic | 102

== Semifinals ==
The top 2 teams from each group advance to the semifinals, in which the top team of Group A plays against the second place team of Group B and the top team of Group B plays against the second place team of Group A.

Three-team ties are determined by the point differential in games played between the three teams, not counting the margin of victory or loss against a non tied team.

August 30
17:30

Game 15

| Virgin Islands | 78–61 | Cuba |
Scoring by quarter: 19-17, 18-14, 17-14, 24-16
| Pts: Jason Edwin 22; Rebs: Cuthbert Victor 14; Asts: Kevin Sheppard 5 | | Pts: Allens Jemmont 10; Rebs: Geoffrei Silvestre 5 Asts: Michael Guerra & Allens Jemmont 3 |

Kuchil Baxal Gymnasium, Cancún

August 30
20:00

Game 16

| Puerto Rico | 76–74 | Dominican Republic |
Scoring by quarter: 20-15, 24-15, 19-23, 13-21
| Pts: José Juan Barea 30; Rebs: Angelo Reyes 13; Asts: José Juan Barea 5 | | Pts: Franklin Western 25; Rebs: Al Horford 14; Asts: Al Horford 6 |

Kuchil Baxal Gymnasium, Cancún

== Final ==
Puerto Rico(5-0) V.S. USVI (3-2) Gold Medal Game

August 31
20:30

Game 20

| Virgin Islands | 70–87 | Puerto Rico |
Scoring by quarter: 20-25, 18-17, 16-19, 16-26
| Pts: Cuthbert Victor 24; Rebs: Kitwana Rhymer 13; Asts: Calvert White 3 | | Pts: Carmelo Lee 21; Rebs: Angelo Reyes 12; Asts: Carlos Arroyo 6 |

Kuchil Baxal Gymnasium, Cancún
