= Anthony Pedroza =

Mexican-American basketball player

Anthony Lever Pedroza Durazo (born March 7, 1979) is a Mexican-American professional basketball player. He is a 6'3" Guard who played international basketball from the France, Croatia, Bosnia, NBA, and professional league in Mexico with Soles de Mexicali in the Liga Nacional de Baloncesto Profesional in Mexico. He is also a member of the Mexico national basketball team.

Pedroza is a long-time member of the Mexico national basketball team. He competed for the team at the FIBA Americas Championship in 2003, 2005, 2007, and 2009. In 2009, Pedroza scored a team-leading 17 points against the Virgin Islands in Mexico's preliminary round victory.

== Early life and high school career ==
Pedroza was born in Tucson, Arizona, to an American father, basketball player Fat Lever, and a Mexican mother. He attended Canyon del Oro High School, graduating in 1998.

== Post-playing career ==
Pedroza worked in consulting for US and Mexican companies. Now he is handling community activities with NBA Mexico and many other entrepreneur endeavors throughout the United States and Mexico.

In March 2022, Pedroza was announced as the sporting director for the Tijuana Zonkeys. However, he was fired the following month.
