= 2006 Centrobasket =

Basketball championship

2006 FIBA Centrobasket
20th Central American and Caribbean Basketball Championship

Tournament details
- Host country: Panama
- Dates: July 4 – July 8
- Teams: 8
- Venue(s): 1 (in 1 host city)

Final positions
- Champions: Panama (4th title)

Tournament statistics
- MVP: (Panama) Michael Hicks
- Top scorer: (Panama) Hicks (24.2)
- Top rebounds: (Panama) García (14.6)
- Top assists: (Panama) Cota (5.6)
- PPG (Team): Puerto Rico (87.4)
- RPG (Team): Panama (47.8)
- APG (Team): Panama (20.8)

Official website
- FIBA Americas

The 2006 Men's Central American and Caribbean Basketball Championship, also known as 2006 Centrobasket, was hosted in Panama City, Panama. The ATLAPA Convention Center in Panama City served as the venue for all the games.

Four teams qualified for the FIBA Americas Championship 2007 in Las Vegas, three teams qualified for the 2007 Pan American Games in Rio de Janeiro, Brazil and seven teams qualified for the 2006 Centroamerican Games in Cartagena de Indias, Colombia.

== Qualification ==
Eight teams qualified during the qualification tournaments held in their respective zones in 2006.

- Host: Panama
- Gold Medal of Centrobasket 2004: Dominican Republic
- Silver Medal of Centrobasket 2004: Puerto Rico
- 2 for Central America:Mexico, Costa Rica
- 3 for the Caribbean:Virgin Islands, Cuba, Jamaica

== First phase ==
=== Group A ===
Team	Pts	Pld	W	L	PF	PA
Panama	6	3	3	0	274	229
(United States Virgin Islands) US Virgin Islands	5	3	2	1	262	205
Dominican Republic	4	3	1	2	249	261
Costa Rica	3	3	0	3	217	307

4 July	14:00	Dominican Republic	(Dominican Republic)	60-91	(United States Virgin Islands)	US Virgin Islands
4 July	21:30	Panama	(Panama)	105-71	(Costa Rica)	Costa Rica
5 July	16:30	Costa Rica	(Costa Rica)	85-108	(Dominican Republic)	Dominican Republic
5 July	21:30	US Virgin Islands	(United States Virgin Islands)	77-84	(Panama)	Panama
6 July	16:30	US Virgin Islands	(United States Virgin Islands)	94-61	(Costa Rica)	Costa Rica
6 July	21:30	Panama	(Panama)	85-81	(Dominican Republic)	Dominican Republic

=== Group B ===
Team	Pts	Pld	W	L	PF	PA
Puerto Rico	6	3	3	0	260	237
Mexico	5	3	2	1	253	232
Cuba	4	3	1	2	244	255
Jamaica	3	3	0	3	233	265

4 July	16:30	Jamaica	(Jamaica)	69-85	(Mexico)	Mexico
4 July	19:00	Cuba	(Cuba)	74-86	(Puerto Rico)	Puerto Rico
5 July	14:00	Mexico	(Mexico)	87-72	(Cuba)	Cuba
5 July	19:00	Puerto Rico	(Puerto Rico)	83-82	(Jamaica)	Jamaica
6 July	14:00	Cuba	(Cuba)	97-82	(Jamaica)	Jamaica
6 July	19:00	Mexico	(Mexico)	81-91	(Puerto Rico)	Puerto Rico

== Semifinals ==
7 July	19:00	Puerto Rico	(Puerto Rico)	84-85	(United States Virgin Islands)	US Virgin Islands
7 July	21:30	Panama	(Panama)	81-66	(Mexico)	Mexico

== Final ==
8 July	21:30	US Virgin Islands	(United States Virgin Islands)	59 - 73	(Panama)	Panama

== Consolation Round ==
Games 13 & 14

7 July	14:00	Dominican Republic	(Dominican Republic)	94-90	(Jamaica)	Jamaica
7 July	16:30	Cuba	(Cuba)	102-59	(Costa Rica)	Costa Rica

=== 7th & 8th Places ===
8 July	14:00	Jamaica	(Jamaica)	100 - 57	(Costa Rica)	Costa Rica

=== 5th & 6th Places ===
8 July	16:30	Dominican Republic	(Dominican Republic)	84-78	(Cuba)	Cuba

== Final ranking ==
1. Panama

2. Virgin Islands

3. Puerto Rico

4. Mexico

5. Dominican Republic

6. Cuba

7. Jamaica

8. Costa Rica

2006 Men's Centrobasket winners

Panama
Fourth title

== Individual awards ==
- All-Star Team:
  - Point guard: Andy Love Ross (PUR)
  - Shooting guard: Raul Rosabal Sanchez (CUB)
  - Small forward: Geoffrey Silvestre (CUB)
  - Power forward: Jack Michael Martínez (DOM)
  - Center: Horacio Llamas (MEX)
