= Adam Parada =

American-born Mexican basketball player (born 1981)

Personal information
- Born: October 21, 1981 (age 45) Alta Loma, California, U.S.
- Listed height: 7 ft 0 in (2.13 m)
- Listed weight: 265 lb (120 kg)

Career information
- High school: Alta Loma (Alta Loma, California)
- College: UC Irvine (2000–2004)
- NBA draft: 2004: undrafted
- Playing career: 2004–2017
- Position: Center

Career history
- 2005–2006: Nagoya Diamond Dolphins
- 2006–2007: Halcones UV Xalapa
- 2007–2008: Fastlink
- 2008-2009: Red Bull Barako
- 2009–2010: Los Angeles Lightning
- 2010-2012: Alaska Aces
- 2012–2015: Halcones UV Xalapa
- 2015–2016: Pioneros de Quintana Roo
- 2016–2017: Fuerza Regia
Medals
Men's basketball
Representing Mexico
Pan American Games
Silver medal – second place	2011 Guadalajara
Centrobasket
Gold medal – first place	2014 Tepic

Adam Oswald Parada de los Reyes (born October 21, 1981) is an American-born Mexican former professional basketball player. He played most notably as an import in the Philippine Basketball Association for the Alaska Aces. He played four years at the University of California, Irvine, but was not drafted by any team in the 2004 NBA draft. He became a mainstay of the Mexico national team. He first played as an import for the Red Bull Barako in 2008 and led the Barako to a third-place finish, becoming the first Latin American reinforcement in an Asian league.

== Pan American Games ==
- Pan American Games 2011 Silver Medal

== Centrobasket ==
- Centrobasket 2014 Gold Medal
