= Daniel Santiago =

Puerto Rican-American basketball player

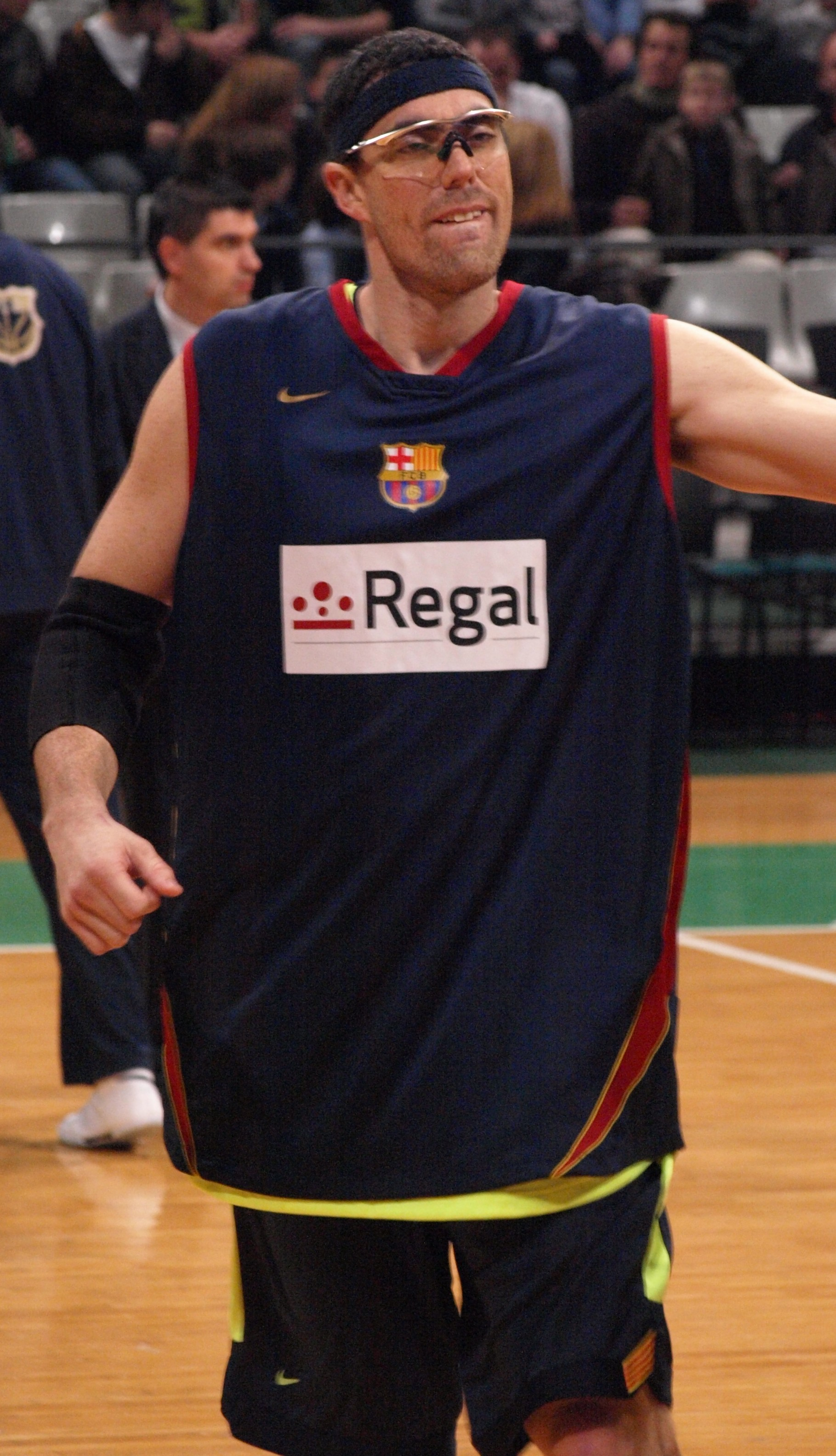

Personal information
- Born: June 24, 1976 (age 50) Lubbock, Texas, U.S.
- Listed height: 7 ft 1 in (2.16 m)
- Listed weight: 260 lb (118 kg)

Career information
- College: New Mexico Military Institute (1994–1995); New Mexico (1995–1997); Saint Vincent (1997–1998)
- NBA draft: 1998: undrafted
- Playing career: 1996–2015
- Position: Center
- Number: 15, 55

Career history
- 1996–1998: Vaqueros de Bayamón
- 1998–2000: Pallacanestro Varese
- 2000–2001: Phoenix Suns
- 2001: Vaqueros de Bayamón
- 2001–2002: Phoenix Suns
- 2002: Vaqueros de Bayamón
- 2002–2003: Lottomatica Roma
- 2003–2005: Milwaukee Bucks
- 2005–2008: Unicaja Málaga
- 2008–2009: Barcelona
- 2009: Vaqueros de Bayamón
- 2009–2010: Efes Pilsen
- 2010: Capitanes de Arecibo
- 2010: Spirou Charleroi
- 2011–2012: Capitanes de Arecibo
- 2012–2013: Boca Juniors
- 2013: Mets de Guaynabo
- 2014–2015: Cangrejeros de Santurce

Career highlights
- 2× Spanish League champion (2006, 2009); Italian League champion (1999); Italian Supercup winner (1999); 4× BSN champion (1996, 2009–2011); NAIA Player of the Year (1998)
- Stats at NBA.com
- Stats at Basketball Reference
Medals
Men's basketball
Representing Puerto Rico
Pan American Games
Gold medal – first place	2011 Mexico
FIBA AmeriCup
Silver medal – second place	2009 San Juan
Silver medal – second place	2013 Venezuela

Daniel Gregg Santiago (born June 24, 1976) is a Puerto Rican basketball coach at IMG Academy and former professional player. A center, he had a collegiate career in the NCAA and NAIA. His professional career saw him play in the NBA, the Baloncesto Superior Nacional of Puerto Rico, and overseas. Santiago has played for the Puerto Rican national team since 1998 until 2014, including been part of the 2004 team that defeated the United States at the 2004 Olympic Games in Greece.

== College career ==
Santiago attended and played Junior College basketball at New Mexico Military Institute in Roswell, New Mexico and played NCAA Division I basketball at the University of New Mexico. He finished up his collegiate career at the NAIA school of Saint Vincent College in Latrobe, Pennsylvania, where he was named NAIA player of the year. In 2019 Daniel Santiago obtained a college degree in General Studies with concentrations in Social Work, Sociology and History from the University of South Florida.

== Professional career ==
In Puerto Rico, Santiago played professionally on the National Superior Basketball League with the Vaqueros, helping the team to various national championships and tournament finals.

Between 1998 and 2000, he played for Varese Roosters of the Italian Serie A.

From 2000 to 2001 he played for the NBA's Phoenix Suns as a back-up center until being released. He returned to the NBA in 2003, playing two seasons with the Milwaukee Bucks.

In 2005, Santiago signed for a season with Spanish ACB League's Unicaja Málaga. After winning the 2006 league, he signed a further two-year deal with the Andalusia outfit. In 2008, Santiago signed with Regal FC Barcelona, helping the side to a third finish in the 2008–09 Euroleague.

In July 2009, Santiago came back to the BSN after a 7-year absence, joining the Bayamón Cowboys. In September 2009 he signed with Efes Pilsen S.K. of Turkey. In October 2010 he signed with Spirou Charleroi. In January 2011 he joined Capitanes de Arecibo.

In September 2012, Santiago signed with Boca Juniors in Argentina. In March 2013, he was selected as the league's best center for the season. In May 2013, he joined the Mets de Guaynabo in Puerto Rico.

== National team career ==
In 2002, Santiago represented senior the Puerto Rican national team at the Indianapolis 2002 FIBA World Cup, and he also played in the 2004 Summer Olympics team that handed the United States their first defeat in Olympic play, since they began using NBA players. Santiago again represented Puerto Rico at the 2006 World Cup. He retired from the national side in 2007, only to return the following year.

== Personal ==
Santiago's paternal grandfather, Pedro Santiago Rodríguez, was a well known baseball player in Puerto Rico and emigrated to the United States to play. Due to his small stature he was nicknamed "Jockey", while grandson Daniel received the "El Gigante" (the giant) moniker. Puerto Rico's Jockey Rodríguez retired from baseball with the Albuquerque Dukes team under the name Pedro Santiago.

Santiago was raised in the West Texas area of Lamesa on a cotton farm and later in Albuquerque, New Mexico where his parents, Stan and Diana Santiago, originated. He has two younger brothers, Matthew and Jarrett Santiago.

== Career statistics ==
Legend
GP	Games played	GS	Games started	MPG	Minutes per game
FG%	Field-goal percentage	3P%	3-point field-goal percentage	FT%	Free-throw percentage
RPG	Rebounds per game	APG	Assists per game	SPG	Steals per game
BPG	Blocks per game	PPG	Points per game	PIR	Performance index rating
**Bold**	Career high

=== NBA ===
==== Regular season ====
Year	Team	GP	GS	MPG	FG%	3P%	FT%	RPG	APG	SPG	BPG	PPG
2000–01	Phoenix	**54**	2	10.8	.478	–	.689	1.9	.2	.3	**.4**	3.1
2001–02	Phoenix	3	0	8.0	**.500**	–	–	2.3	**.7**	.0	.3	2.7
2003–04	Milwaukee	**54**	**28**	**13.1**	.479	–	.678	**2.4**	.4	**.4**	**.4**	**4.0**
2004–05	Milwaukee	11	0	9.5	.333	–	**.727**	1.7	.1	.3	**.4**	2.0
Career		122	30	11.6	.469	–	.685	2.1	.3	.3	.4	3.4

==== Playoffs ====
Year	Team	GP	GS	MPG	FG%	3P%	FT%	RPG	APG	SPG	BPG	PPG
2001	Phoenix	**1**	0	**12.0**	**.500**	–	–	**5.0**	.0	.0	**2.0**	**2.0**
2004	Milwaukee	**1**	0	1.0	–	–	–	.0	.0	.0	.0	.0
Career		2	0	6.5	.500	–	–	2.5	.0	.0	1.0	1.0

=== EuroLeague ===
*	Led the league

Year	Team	GP	GS	MPG	FG%	3P%	FT%	RPG	APG	SPG	BPG	PPG	PIR
2005–06	Málaga	19	18	**24.8**	.641	.000	.641	**5.6**	.6	.6	.7	**12.9**	**15.4**
2006–07	Málaga	22	17	22.4	.601	—	.549	4.9	**1.1**	**.9**	**.9**	11.1	13.8
2007–08	Málaga	17	13	17.4	**.679**	—	.684	4.2	.4	.5	.7	9.0	11.6
2008–09	Barcelona	**23***	**20**	14.8	.552	.000	.762	2.7	.5	.3	.8	6.4	6.7
2009–10	Efes	15	2	10.6	.651	.000	**.829**	2.5	.3	.1	.7	5.7	7.3
2010–11	Charleroi	9	8	13.2	.476	—	.611	3.3	.3	.6	.3	5.7	6.2
Career		105	78	17.9	.609	.000	.648	4.0	.6	.5	.7	8.8	10.6

=== Domestic leagues ===
Season	Team	League	GP	MPG	FG%	3P%	FT%	RPG	APG	SPG	BPG	PPG
1996	Vaqueros de Bayamón	BSN	23	?	.570	--	.690	3.3	.5	?	?	5.0
1997	Vaqueros de Bayamón	BSN	24	?	.590	--	.820	3.2	.5	?	?	4.4
1998	Vaqueros de Bayamón	BSN	7	?	.390	--	1.000	2.9	.4	?	?	3.4
1998–99	Pallacanestro Varese	Lega A	36	18.4	.629	--	.663	3.5	.2	1.3	.8	6.1
1999–00	Pallacanestro Varese	Lega A	27	29.9	.575	.200	.654	7.1	.6	2.7	.9	13.2
2001	Vaqueros de Bayamón	BSN	6	?	.560	.000	.690	4.8	.7	?	?	10.2
2002	Vaqueros de Bayamón	BSN	27	?	.610	.000	.770	6.9	1.1	?	?	15.0
2002–03	Lottomatica Roma	Lega A	42	29.3	.574	.333	.610	8.0	1.0	2.8	1.5	12.3
2005–06	Unicaja	Liga ACB	43	21.4	.605	.000	.721	4.1	.4	1.2	.9	10.4
2006–07	Unicaja	Liga ACB	24	20.3	.601	.000	.656	3.8	.7	1.1	.8	10.3
2007–08	Unicaja	Liga ACB	33	15.8	.552	.000	.737	3.2	.4	.8	.8	8.4
2008–09	FC Barcelona	Liga ACB	41	12.1	.562	.000	.726	2.0	.5	.5	.8	4.9
2009	Vaqueros de Bayamón	BSN	5	25.2	.488	.333	.500	6.6	3.4	1.4	1.2	11.2
2010	Capitanes de Arecibo	BSN	29	21.3	.554	.462	.738	5.7	1.1	.8	.7	11.0
2010–11	Spirou Charleroi	Ethias League	5	17.2	.577	--	.733	4.0	1.2	.4	1.0	8.2
2011	Capitanes de Arecibo	BSN	42	21.7	.577	.000	.715	5.8	1.7	.5	1.8	11.0
2012	Capitanes de Arecibo	BSN	48	19.9	.577	.000	.647	4.4	1.0	.6	.9	9.3
2012–13	Boca Juniors	Argentina LNB	49	24.2	.629	.286	.588	5.8	1.3	.8	1.1	11.9
2013	Mets de Guaynabo	BSN	24	24.8	.566	--	.591	5.9	1.9	.5	.9	10.2
2014	Cangrejeros de Santurce	BSN	47	22.1	.572	.000	.701	5.0	1.2	.5	1.0	9.7
2015	Cangrejeros de Santurce	BSN	13	11.2	.524	.000	.500	2.6	.6	.1	.7	3.9

== See also ==
- List of Puerto Ricans
- Puerto Rico Men's National Basketball Team
- Puerto Rico at the 2004 Summer Olympics
- José "Piculín" Ortiz
- Elías Larry Ayuso
- Carlos Arroyo
