= Filiberto Rivera =

Puerto Rican basketball player

No. 21 – Gigantes de Carolina
- Position: Point guard
- League: BSN

Personal information
- Born: September 28, 1982 (age 44) Carolina, Puerto Rico
- Listed height: 6 ft 2 in (1.88 m)
- Listed weight: 175 lb (79 kg)

Career information
- College: Southeastern CC (2001–2003); UTEP (2003–2005)
- NBA draft: 2005: undrafted
- Playing career: 2003–present

Career history
- 2000–2003: Maratonistas de Coamo
- 2005–2007: Artland Dragons
- 2007: Napoli
- 2007–2008: AEK Athens
- 2008: Gigantes de Carolina
- 2008–2009: Brose Bamberg
- 2009: Gigantes de Carolina
- 2010: Gallitos de Isabela
- 2010–2011: Bnei HaSharon
- 2011–2012: Atléticos de San Germán
- 2012: Titanes del Distrito Nacional
- 2012–2013: Gaiteros
- 2013: Caciques de Humacao
- 2013–2014: Halcones Rojos Veracruz
- 2014: Vaqueros de Bayamón
- 2015–2016: Indios de Mayagüez
- 2016: Science City Jena
- 2017–2018: Cariduros de Fajardo
- 2019: Santeros de Aguada
- 2020: Plateros de Fresnillo
- 2021–2022: Cangrejeros de Santurce
- 2023–present: Gigantes de Carolina

Career highlights
- LNBP champion (2014); 3× BSN champion (2006, 2019, 2023); BSN Rookie of the Year (2000); WAC tournament MVP (2005); NJCAA Player of the Year (2003); NJCAA First Team All-American (2003)
Medals
Men's basketball
Representing Puerto Rico
FIBA AmeriCup
Silver medal – second place	2009 Puerto Rico
Bronze medal – third place	2007 United States
Pan American Games
Gold medal – first place	2011 Mexico
Centrobasket
Gold medal – first place	2008 Mexico
Gold medal – first place	2010 Dominican Republic
Silver medal – second place	2004 Santo Domingo
Bronze medal – third place	2006 Panama
Central American and Caribbean Games
Gold medal – first place	2006 Colombia
Gold medal – first place	2010 Puerto Rico
FIBA CBC Championship
Gold medal – first place	2007 Puerto Rico

Filiberto Rivera (born September 28, 1982), also known as "Fili", is a Puerto Rican professional basketball player for Gigantes de Carolina of the Baloncesto Superior Nacional (BSN), in Puerto Rico. Rivera has played in the NCAA, NJCAA, and has also played internationally in Germany and Italy. He was also a member of the Puerto Rican national team earlier in his career.

== Biography ==
=== Amateur career ===
Rivera has played in the National Superior Basketball League of Puerto Rico since 1999. Rivera won Rookie of the Year in 2000 for National Superior Basketball League of Puerto Rico.

Rivera had a notable college career where he was named First Team NJCAA All-American, Junior College Player of the Year (2002–03), and First Team All-WAC his junior and senior seasons. Ranks third on University of Texas El Paso all-time lists in career assists (381)and free throw percentage (.815). Finished collegiate career at Texas-El Paso after playing first two seasons at Southeastern Community College in West Burlington, Iowa.

During his senior year (2004–05), Rivera averaged 13.5 points while leading the WAC and ranking seventh nationally in assists (7.2 apg). Also paced the conference in free throw shooting (.853) and ranked sixth in steals (1.3 spg). Season total of 229 assists set a school record. Dished out 10 or more assists five times and posted two double-doubles. Recorded a school single-game record 18 assists versus zero turnovers vs. Louisiana Tech. Tallied 23 points and six assists at Nevada. Posted 19 points and 12 assists vs. Fresno State. Scored 21 points and grabbed a career-high seven steals at San Jose State. Registered a career-high 32 points vs. Boise State in the WAC tournament title game. Earned WAC Tournament MVP honors.

During his junior year (2003–04), Rivera averaged 11.2 points, 3.1 rebounds, 4.8 assists (third in the WAC) and 1.7 steals (fourth). Scored in double figures in 21 games. Recorded season-high 22 points at San Jose State. Tallied 14 points and eight assists vs. Rutgers. Named to the WAC All-Tournament team after averaging 9.3 points, 6.0 rebounds and 4.7 assists in three games. Registered 14 points, six assists, and a career-high nine rebounds vs. Nevada in the WAC Tournament title game. Scored 12 points and grabbed six assists vs. Maryland in the first round of the NCAA Tournament.

During his sophomore year (2002–03), at Southeastern Community College (Iowa), Rivera averaged 16.2 points and 6.7 assists. Helped lead Southeastern to a 37-1 record and a NJCAA Tournament championship. Averaged 17.4 points during the NJCAA Tournament on his way to MVP honors. Led team with 18 points in the title game vs. San Jacinto (Tex.). Set season-high with 37 points vs. Iowa Western. Named a First Team NJCAA All-American and Junior College Player of the Year.

During his freshman year (2001–02), Rivera averaged 11.9 points and a team-high 5.1 assists. Ranked third on the team in scoring and led the squad in average steals. Helped team to a 25-10 overall record.

=== NBA and Europe ===
During the summer of 2005, Filiberto participated in the Summer Pro League with the Dallas Mavericks and Cleveland Cavaliers.

During the summer of 2006, Rivera represented Puerto Rico in the Basketball World Championship 2006 and 2006 Central American and Caribbean Games where Puerto Rico won the Gold Medal.

During the 2006–2007 season, Rivera played with Artland Dragons of the German Bundesliga. The Dragons were regarded as a "Cinderella team" entering the playoffs, winning the first round against Alba Berlin. Rivera led the team in the league's semifinal, scoring sixteen points, five rebounds and three assists in a victory over the Koeln the fifth and last game of the series. Rivera had an average of 15.5 points, 4.3 rebounds and 6.0 prior to the finals.

During Summer of 2007, he was invited to participate with the Chicago Bulls during the Pepsi Pro Summer League, but did not play due to injury.

He started the 2007/08 season in Italy with Eldo Basket Napoli left on December 12, and joined AEK Athens BC

On 2006 Rivera participated in the BSN, where he led the team to the league's championship. On January 29, 2008, the Carolina Giants announced that they began negotiations with Rivera. On January 31, 2008 the team officially announced Rivera's signing.

Prior to 2010–2011 season Rivera has signed with Israeli club Bnei HaSharon

On October 28, 2016, Rivera parted ways with the German team Science City Jena.

== Career stats ==
Rivera's NCAA stats in 64 games are 790 points with a 12.3 PPG, 381 assists with a 6.0 APG, 184 rebounds with a 2.9 RPG, 97 steals with a 1.5 SPG, .452 field goal percentage, .815 free-throw percentage, and .360 3-point percentage. Rivera's NJCAA stats in 57 games are 830 points with a 14.6 PPG, 349 assists with a 6.1 APG, 153 rebounds with a 2.7 RPG, 142 steals with a 2.5 SPG, .460 field goal percentage, .778 free-throw percentage, and .269 3-point percentage.
