= Carmelo Antrone Lee =

Puerto Rican basketball player (born 1977)

Personal information
- Born: June 7, 1977 (age 49) Atlanta, Georgia
- Listed height: 6 ft 7 in (2.01 m)
- Listed weight: 220 lb (100 kg)

Career information
- College: Florida (1995–1996); Long Beach State (1997–2000)
- NBA draft: 2000: undrafted
- Playing career: 2002–2016
- Position: Forward

Career history
- 2002–2003: Austin Cyclones
- 2003–2004: Leñadores de Durango
- 2004–2005: Cometas de Querétaro
- 2005: Gallitos de Isabela
- 2005–2006: Lobos Grises de la UAD
- 2006: Conquistadores de Guaynabo
- 2006: Regatas Corrientes
- 2006–2007: CAB Madeira Funchal
- 2007: Guaros de Lara
- 2007: Conquistadores de Guaynabo
- 2008–2009: Ironi Ramat Gan
- 2009–2012: Vaqueros de Bayamón
- 2013–2014: Piratas de Quebradillas
- 2014–2015: Atenienses de Manati
- 2016: Piratas de Quebradillas

Career highlights
- LNBP All-Star (2003)
Medals
Men's basketball
Representing Puerto Rico
FIBA AmeriCup
Silver medal – second place	2009 Puerto Rico
Bronze medal – third place	2007 United States
Pan American Games
Silver medal – second place	2007 Brazil
Centrobasket
Gold medal – first place	2008 Mexico
Bronze medal – third place	2006 Panama
FIBA CBC Championship
Gold medal – first place	2007 Puerto Rico
Central American and Caribbean Games
Gold medal – first place	2006 Colombia
Gold medal – first place	2010 Puerto Rico

Carmelo Antrone Lee (born June 7, 1977) is an American former professional basketball player. Lee has played with the Guaynabo Conquistadores in the National Superior Basketball league of Puerto Rico, he played with Vaqueros de Bayamón from 2009 to 2012. Internationally he has played with the Guaros (Venezuela), CAB (Portugal), Regatas C. (Argentina), LNBP (Mexico) and Metros (Dominican Republic). In 2007, Lee was included as a small forward in the Puerto Rico national basketball team. In 2009, he won the Puerto Rico national championship with Bayamon.

== Early life ==
Lee was born in the United States to an African American mother and Puerto Rican father.

== Career ==
- 1995–1996: Florida (NCAA)
- 1997–1998: Long Beach St. (NCAA)
- 1998–1999: Long Beach St. (NCAA)
- 1999–2000: Long Beach St. (NCAA)
- 2000: Nike Summer League in Treviso (ITA)
- 2002: Austin Cyclones (XBL)
- 2003: Leñadores de Durango (MEX-LNBP)
- 2004: Leñadores Durango (MEX-LNBP), in Aug. moved to Cometas de Querétaro (MEX-LNBP) 17g 18.4ppg 6.1rpg 2.7apg
- 2005, February: BSN Pre-Draft Camp, Puerto Rico
- 2005 March: drafted by Isabela (BSN Draft 1st Round- Nr.2)
- 2005: Gallitos de Isabela (PUR-BSN): 32 games: 7.4ppg, 4.4rpg, 2.1apg, 2FGP: 47.0%, 3FGP: 25.0%, FT: 64.0%
- 2005: IN Aug. signed at Lobos Grises de la UAD (MEX-LNBP): 22 games: 21.3ppg, 7.2rpg, 2.0apg, 1.5spg, 1.5bpg, 2FGP: 53.0%, 3FGP: 33.5%, FT: 81.1%
- 2006: Conquistadores de Guaynabo (PUR-BSN,1T): 18.1ppg, 5.1rpg, 1.6bpg, in Sep. moved to Metros de Santiago (DOM-LIDOBA North)
- 2006–2007: Regatas Corrientes (ARG-LigaA), released in Nov.'06: 7 games: 8.3ppg, 4.3rpg, 1.0spg, 2FGP: 42.9%, 3FGP: 33.3%, FT: 80%, then moved to CAB Madeira Funchal (POR-UZO Liga): 1 game: 6pts, 1reb, 2ast; left in Jan.'07 because of injury
- 2007: In February signed at Guaros de Lara (VEN-LPB,1T), in April moved to Conquistadores de Guaynabo (PUR-BSN,1T)
- 2008:Signed for Ironi Ramat Gan
- 2009:Signed for Vaqueros de Bayamón (PUR-BSN)

== Awards and achievements ==
- Mexican LNBP All-Star Game −2003
- Puerto Rican National Team −2005–present
- Mexican LNBP Regular Season Runner-Up −05
- Centrobasket −2006: (Bronze): 5 games: 3.6ppg, 3.2rpg
- World Championships in Japan −2006: 5 games: 3.0ppg, 1.2rpg
- Dominican Rep. LIDOBA Finals MVP −2006
- Dominican Rep. LIDOBA Champion −2006
- Puerto Rican BSN All-Star Game −2006
- Puerto Rican BSN Championship- 2009
- Silver Medal (Puerto Rican National Team) Marchand Invitational Cup-2009
- Silver Medal (Puerto Rican National Team) FIBA Americas Championship- 2009
- Puerto Rican BSN All-Star Game-2010
- Puerto Rican BSN All-Star-Game MVP- 2010
