= Mexico men's national basketball team =

Men's national basketball team representing Mexico

Mexico
- FIBA ranking: 26 ▲2 (1 September 2026)
- Joined FIBA: 1933; 93 years ago
- FIBA zone: FIBA Americas
- National federation: Asociación Deportiva Mexicana de Básquetbol (ADEMEBA)
- Coach: Omar Quintero
- Nickname: 12 Guerreros

Olympic Games
- Appearances: 7
- Medals: Bronze: (1936)

FIBA World Cup
- Appearances: 6

FIBA AmeriCup
- Appearances: 15
- Medals: Gold: (2013); Bronze: (2017)
First	Second

The Mexico national basketball team (Spanish: selección de baloncesto de México / selección Mexicana de básquetbol) represents Mexico in men's international basketball competitions, The team has made 6 appearances in FIBA World Cup and 5 appearances in the Summer Olympics. The governing body of the team is the Asociación Deportiva Mexicana de Básquetbol (ADEMEBA).

In 2013, Mexico won the FIBA AmeriCup.

== History ==
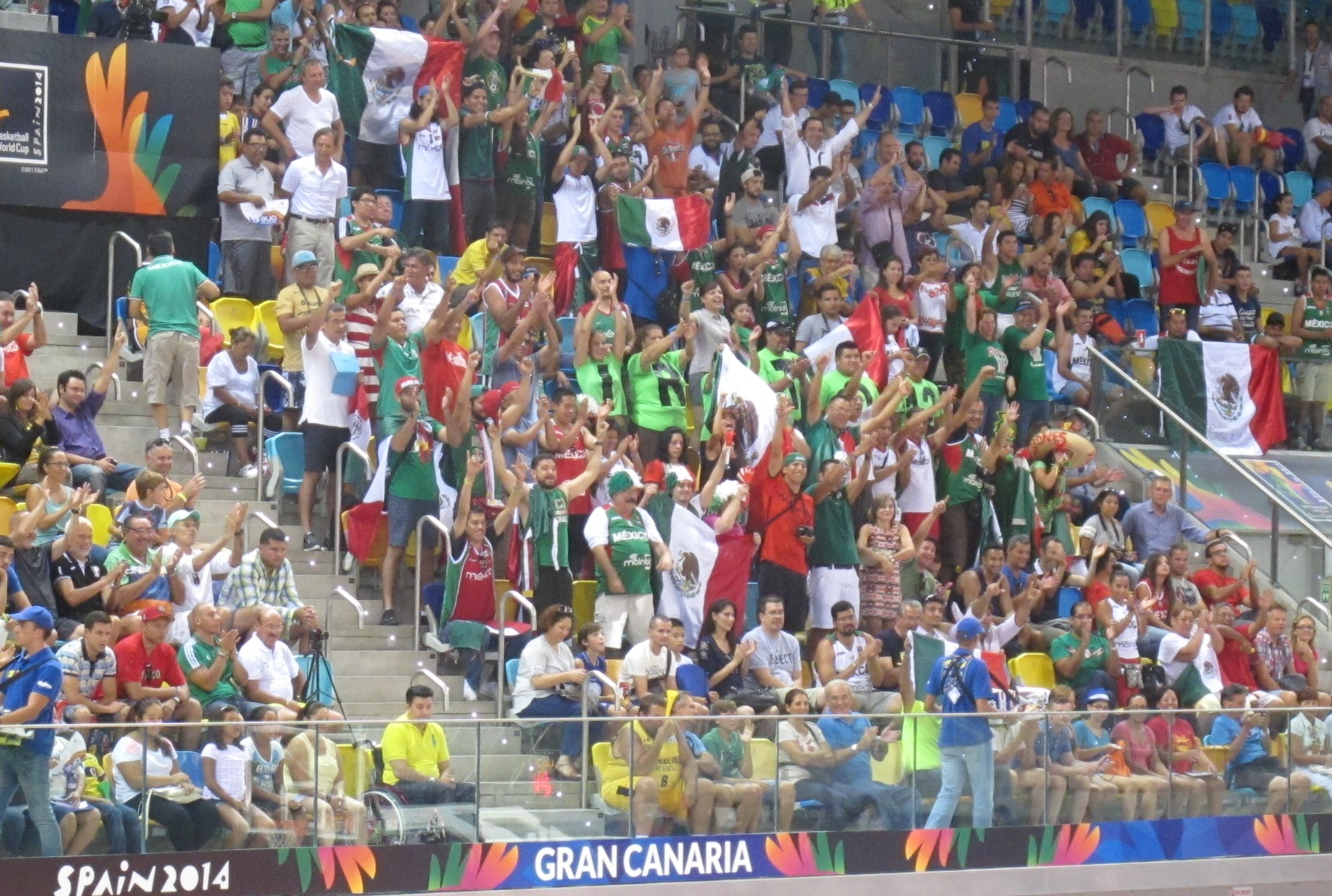
Fans of Team Mexico at the 2014 Basketball World Cup

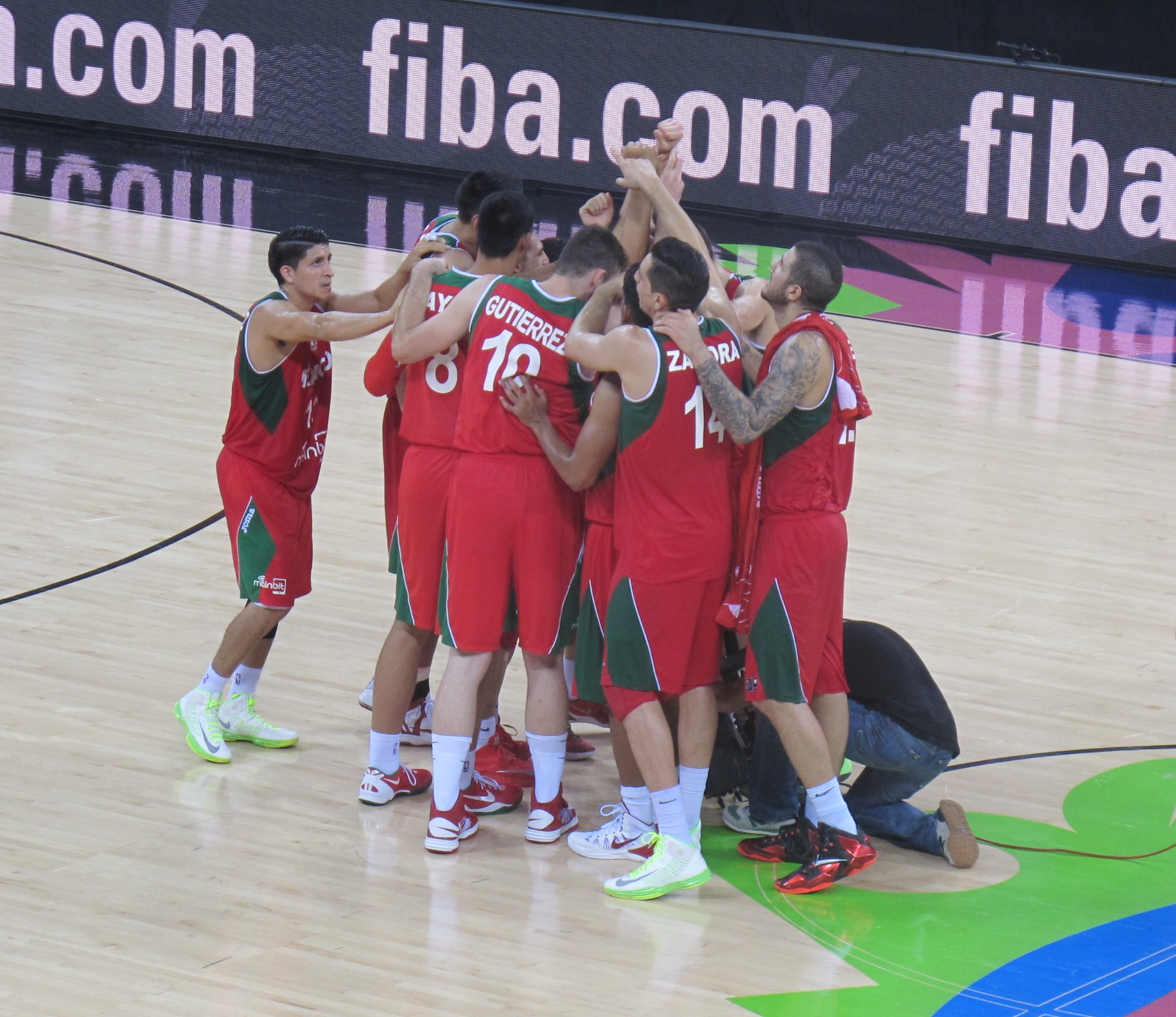
Team Mexico celebrating a victory.

Until the late 1960s, team Mexico was a major force at the world stage. The team won the bronze medal at the 1936 Summer Olympics, finished 4th at the 1948 event and 5th in 1968. Mexico won the Pan American Games silver medal in Winnipeg 1967 led by Captain Carlos Quintanar with players like Arturo Guerrero and Manuel Raga.

At the FIBA Americas Championship 2009 in San Juan, Puerto Rico, Mexico finished 7th, ahead of Panama, Venezuela and the United States Virgin Islands.

On individual performances, Gustavo Ayon finished among the tournament's top performers in steals (3rd), blocks (3rd) and minutes per game (9th).

Both Eduardo Nájera and Earl Watson expressed their interest in representing Mexico internationally. However, neither received permission by their NBA teams to participate at the FIBA Americas Championship 2009 in San Juan, Puerto Rico.

=== Mexico Beats Team USA ===
On 29 October 2011, Mexico defeated Team USA 71–55. This 16 point victory took place during the 2011 Pan Am Games.

=== "La Edad de Oro" (since 2013) ===
Mexico took part in the FIBA Americas Championship 2013 to replace Panama, who were disqualified. To the surprise of many they beat hosts Venezuela in their opening game, and advanced to the second round with wins over Paraguay and the Dominican Republic. They later finished top of the eight-team second round group and a semi-final win over heavy favourites Argentina saw them through to the final.

On 11 September 2013, they beat Puerto Rico 91–83 in the gold medal game to win the FIBA Americas Championship. Inside player Gustavo Ayón was voted as the tournament's Most Valuable Player.

==== 2014 Basketball World Cup ====
The surprising gold medal at the 2013 FIBA Americas Championship secured Mexico a spot at the 2014 FIBA World Cup in Spain. This marked the first qualification to the Basketball World Cup in 40 years.

At the 2014 FIBA World Cup, the Mexicans won two of their five preliminary round games against Korea and Angola which earned them a playoff spot for the first time in their history. They would, however, come unstuck against eventual champions USA.

Especially noteworthy was Mexico's 3 point field goal percentage, which was one of the highest among all the teams at the event.

==== 2015 FIBA Americas Championship ====
Due to Mexico's strong performances of late, the country gained the right to host the 2015 FIBA Americas Championship.

=== Mexico Defeats Team USA Again ===
On 28 June 2018, Mexico defeated Team USA 78–70 during the 2019 FIBA Basketball World Cup Qualifiers. Mexico was led by Gustavo Ayon and Juan Toscano-Anderson. Team USA was led by Alex Caruso, David Stockton, and coached by Jeff Van Gundy.

On 19 November 2021, Mexico defeated Team USA 97–88 during the 2023 FIBA Basketball World Cup Qualifiers. Mexico was led by Orlando Méndez-Valdez (who was also part of Mexico's victory over Team USA in 2018) and Team USA was led by Isaiah Thomas and Luke Kornet.

On 2 September 2022, Mexico defeated Team USA 73–67 during the 2022 FIBA AmeriCup in Recife, Brazil. Mexico was led by Paul Stoll and Fabian Jaimes. Team USA was led by Jodie Meeks, Patrick McCaw, Frank Mason III, and Norris Cole.

On 16 August 2023, Team Mexico defeated the Kansas State University Wildcats 83–81 in an exhibition game in Abu Dhabi, United Arab Emirates. Kansas State made it to the Elite Eight in the NCAA Tournament in the 2022–23 season.

== Honours ==
Worldwide

- FIBA World Cup
  - 8th place: 1967
- Olympic Games
  - Third place: 1936

Continental

- FIBA AmeriCup
  - Champions (1): 2013
  - Third place: 2017
- Pan American Games
  - Runners-up (3): 1967, 1991, 2011
  - Third place: 1983

Regional

- FIBA Centrobasket
  - Champions (3): 1965, 1975, 2014
  - Runners-up (4): 1973, 1991, 2001, 2016
  - Third place: 1987, 2003
- FIBA COCABA Championship
  - Champions (4): 2006, 2007, 2009, 2013
- Central American and Caribbean Games
  - Champions (8): 1926, 1930, 1935, 1938, 1946, 1950, 1954, 1990
  - Runners-up (3): 1966, 2010, 2023
  - Third place: 1962, 1974, 1978, 1982, 2002

=== FIBA honours summary ===
Competition	1st place, gold medalist(s)	2nd place, silver medalist(s)	3rd place, bronze medalist(s)	Total
FIBA World Cup	0	0	0	0
Olympic Games	0	0	1	1
FIBA AmeriCup	1	0	1	2
FIBA Centrobasket	3	4	2	9
FIBA COCABA Championship	4	0	0	4
Total	8	4	4	16

== Competitive record ==
=== Summer Olympics ===
Olympic Games record
Year	Round	Position	Pld	W	L	PF	PA	PD	Team
(Nazi Germany) 1936	Bronze medalists	3rd of 21	4	3	1	98	76	+22	Team
(United Kingdom) 1948	Fourth place	4th of 23	7	5	2	364	264	+100	Team
(Finland) 1952	Fifteenth place	15th of 23	3	1	2	172	171	+1	Team
(Australia) 1956	Did not qualify								
(Italy) 1960	Twelfth place	12th of 16	9	4	5	602	637	−35	Team
(Japan) 1964	Twelfth place	12th of 16	9	3	6	615	657	−42	Team
(Mexico) 1968	Fifth place	5th of 16	9	7	2	641	580	+61	Team
(West Germany) 1972	Did not qualify								
(Canada) 1976	Tenth place	10th of 12	7	3	4	547	600	−53	Team
(Soviet Union) 1980	Did not qualify								
(South Korea) 1988	Did not qualify								
(Spain) 1992	Did not qualify								
(United States) 1996	Did not qualify								
(Australia) 2000	Did not qualify								
(Greece) 2004	Did not qualify								
(China) 2008	Did not qualify								
(United Kingdom) 2012	Did not qualify								
(Brazil) 2016	Did not qualify								
(Japan) 2020	Did not qualify								
(France) 2024	Did not qualify								
(United States) 2028	To be determined								
(Australia) 2032	To be determined								
Total	Bronze medal	7/22	48	26	22	3,039	2,885	+154	—

=== FIBA World Olympic Qualifying ===
Year	Position	Pld	W	L
(Japan) 1964	1st place	9	8	1
(Germany) 1972	4th place	No data		
(Canada) 1976	3rd place	No data		
(Italy) 2016	4th place	3	1	2
(Croatia) 2020	3rd place	3	1	2
(Puerto Rico) 2024	4th place	3	1	2

=== FIBA World Cup ===
FIBA World Cup record
Year	Round	Position	Pld	W	L	PF	PA	PD	Team
(Argentina) 1950	Did not qualify								
(Brazil) 1954	Did not qualify								
(Chile) 1959	Thirteen place	13th of 13	6	0	6	342	427	−85	Team
(Brazil) 1963	Ninth place	9th of 13	8	4	4	629	624	+5	Team
(Uruguay) 1967	Eighth place	8th of 13	8	6	2	534	486	+48	Team
(Socialist Federal Republic of Yugoslavia) 1970	Did not qualify								
(Puerto Rico) 1974	Ninth place	9th of 14	8	6	2	746	705	+41	Team
(Philippines) 1978	Did not qualify								
(Colombia) 1982	Did not qualify								
(Spain) 1986	Did not qualify								
(Argentina) 1990	Did not qualify								
(Canada) 1994	Did not qualify								
(Greece) 1998	Did not qualify								
(United States) 2002	Did not qualify								
(Japan) 2006	Did not qualify								
(Turkey) 2010	Did not qualify								
(Spain) 2014	Round of 16	14th of 24	6	2	4	433	458	−25	Team
(China) 2019	Did not qualify								
(Philippines) (Japan) (Indonesia) 2023	Twenty-fifth place	25th of 32	5	2	3	410	467	−57	Team
(Qatar) 2027	To be determined								
(France) 2031	To be determined								
Total	Round of 16	6/20	41	20	21	3,094	3,167	−73	—

=== FIBA AmeriCup ===
FIBA AmeriCup record
Year	Round	Position	Pld	W	L	PF	PA	PD	Team
(Puerto Rico) 1980	Fifth place	5th of 7	6	2	4	538	589	–51	Team
(Brazil) 1984	Fifth place	5th of 9	8	3	5	724	780	−56	Team
(Uruguay) 1988	Sixth place	6th of 7	6	2	4	546	549	−3	Team
(Mexico) 1989	Ninth place	9th of 12	5	1	4	453	476	−23	Team
(United States) 1992	Seventh place	7th of 10	4	1	3	328	331	−3	Team
(Puerto Rico) 1993	Did not qualify								
(Argentina) 1995	Did not qualify								
(Uruguay) 1997	Tenth place	10th of 10	4	0	4	282	352	−70	Team
(Puerto Rico) 1999	Did not qualify								
(Argentina) 2001	Ninth place	9th of 10	4	0	4	362	407	−45	Team
(Puerto Rico) 2003	Sixth place	6th of 10	12	6	6	992	1091	−99	Team
(Dominican Republic) 2005	Tenth place	10th of 10	4	1	3	324	371	−47	Team
(United States) 2007	Seventh place	7th of 10	11	3	8	991	1082	−91	Team
(Puerto Rico) 2009	Seventh place	7th of 10	11	2	9	663	845	−182	Team
(Argentina) 2011	Did not qualify								
(Venezuela) 2013	Champions	1st of 10	13	10	3	1,029	964	+65	Team
(Mexico) 2015	Fourth place	4th of 10	13	10	3	1,042	950	+92	Team
(Argentina) (Colombia) (Uruguay) 2017	Third place	3rd of 12	5	4	1	396	361	+35	Team
(Brazil) 2022	Fifth place	5th of 12	4	2	2	289	289	0	Team
(Nicaragua) 2025	Did not qualify								
(N/A) 2029	To be determined								
Total	1 title	15/21	110	47	63	8,929	9,437	−508	—

=== Pan American Games ===
Pan American Games record
Year	Round	Position	Pld	W	L	PF	PA	PD	Team
(Argentina) 1951	Eighth place	8th of 10	6	3	3	344	308	+36	Team
(Mexico) 1955	Fourth place	4th of 6	5	2	3	360	351	+9	Team
(United States) 1959	Fourth place	4th of 6	6	4	2	383	409	+26	Team
(Brazil) 1963	Seventh place	7th of 7	6	1	5	415	528	–113	Team
(Canada) 1967	Sliver medalists	2nd of 10	9	8	1	625	595	+30	Team
(Colombia) 1971	Fourth place	4th of 13	8	4	4	716	579	+137	Team
(Mexico) 1975	Fourth place	4th of 10	9	5	4	776	710	+66	Team
(Puerto Rico) 1979	Eighth place	8th of 10	6	2	4	611	590	+21	Team
(Venezuela) 1983	Bronze medalists	3rd of 9	8	4	4	645	682	–37	Team
(United States) 1987	Fourth place	4th of 10	7	2	5	639	667	–28	Team
(Cuba) 1991	Sliver medalists	2nd of 10	7	4	3	556	561	–5	Team
(Argentina) 1995	Fifth place	5th of 6	6	1	5	488	588	–100	Team
(Canada) 1999	Did not enter								
(Dominican Republic) 2003	Fifth place	5th of 8	5	2	3	399	436	–37	Team
(Brazil) 2007	Did not enter								
(Mexico) 2011	Sliver medalists	2nd of 8	5	3	2	374	323	+51	Team
(Canada) 2015	Eighth place	8th of 8	3	1	2	232	275	–43	Team
(Peru) 2019	Seventh place	7th of 8	3	1	2	194	201	–7	Team
(Chile) 2023	Fourth place	4th of 10	5	1	4	329	390	−64	Team
Total	Sliver medal	17/19	99	47	52	7,757	7,803	–46	—

=== Central American and Caribbean Games ===
Year	Position	Tournament	Host
1926	1st place, gold medalist(s)	1926 Central American and Caribbean Games	Mexico City, Mexico
1930	1st place, gold medalist(s)	1930 Central American and Caribbean Games	Havana, Cuba
1935	1st place, gold medalist(s)	1935 Central American and Caribbean Games	San Salvador, El Salvador
1938	1st place, gold medalist(s)	1938 Central American and Caribbean Games	Panama City, Panama
1946	1st place, gold medalist(s)	1946 Central American and Caribbean Games	Barranquilla, Colombia
1950	1st place, gold medalist(s)	1950 Central American and Caribbean Games	Guatemala City, Guatemala
1954	1st place, gold medalist(s)	1954 Central American and Caribbean Games	Mexico City, Mexico
1959	–	1959 Central American and Caribbean Games	Caracas, Venezuela
1962	3rd place, bronze medalist(s)	1962 Central American and Caribbean Games	Kingston, Jamaica
1966	2nd place, silver medalist(s)	1966 Central American and Caribbean Games	San Juan, Puerto Rico
1970	4	1970 Central American and Caribbean Games	Panama City, Panama
1974	3rd place, bronze medalist(s)	1974 Central American and Caribbean Games	Santo Domingo, Dominican Republic
1978	3rd place, bronze medalist(s)	1978 Central American and Caribbean Games	Medellin, Colombia
1982	3rd place, bronze medalist(s)	1982 Central American and Caribbean Games	Havana, Cuba
1986	5	1986 Central American and Caribbean Games	Santiago de los Caballeros, Dominican Republic
1990	1st place, gold medalist(s)	1990 Central American and Caribbean Games	Mexico City, Mexico
1993	–	1993 Central American and Caribbean Games	Ponce, Puerto Rico
1998	10	1998 Central American and Caribbean Games	Maracaibo, Venezuela
2002	3rd place, bronze medalist(s)	2002 Central American and Caribbean Games	San Salvador, El Salvador
2006	5	2006 Central American and Caribbean Games	Cartagena, Colombia
2010	2nd place, silver medalist(s)	2010 Central American and Caribbean Games	Mayagüez, Puerto Rico
2014	5	2014 Central American and Caribbean Games	Veracruz, Mexico
2018	5	2018 Central American and Caribbean Games	Barranquilla, Colombia
2023	2nd place, silver medalist(s)	2023 Central American and Caribbean Games	San Salvador, El Salvador
2026	4	2026 Central American and Caribbean Games	Santo Domingo, Dominican Republic

1st place, gold medalist(s)	2nd place, silver medalist(s)	3rd place, bronze medalist(s)	Total
8	3	5	16

== Results and fixtures ==
=== 2025 ===
8 August 2025 2027 FIBA World Cup – Americas Pre-qualifiers Second Round	Mexico	77–66	Costa Rica	Ciudad Obregón, Mexico
20:00	Scoring by quarter: 22–14, 25–22, 16–18, 14–12
	Pts: Girón 15; Rebs: Bonilla, Gutiérrez 9 Asts: Cruz 9	Boxscore	Pts: Martínez 13; Rebs: Arias 7 Asts: Alvarado 6	Arena: Arena ITSON; Attendance: 2,242; Referees: Roberto Vázquez (PUR), Fernando Leite (BRA), Julirys Guzmán (PUR)

9 August 2025 2027 FIBA World Cup – Americas Pre-qualifiers Second Round	Mexico	113–78	Barbados	Ciudad Obregón, Mexico
20:00	Scoring by quarter: 25–24, 33–22, 32–16, 23–16
	Pts: Bonilla 22; Rebs: Bonilla 7 Asts: Cruz 8	Boxscore	Pts: Thorpe 16; Rebs: Thorpe 7 Asts: Alexander, Hurley 3	Arena: Arena ITSON; Attendance: 1,718; Referees: Orlando Varela (HON), Nicolas Zivieri (BRA), Carlos Pallares (COL)

10 August 2025 2027 FIBA World Cup – Americas Pre-qualifiers Second Round	Jamaica	61–90	Mexico	Ciudad Obregón, Mexico
19:00	Scoring by quarter: 8–24, 27–19, 12–23, 14–24
	Pts: Thomas 11; Rebs: Facey 7 Asts: Foster 6	Boxscore	Pts: Cruz 21; Rebs: Gutiérrez 12; Asts: Stoll 8	Arena: Arena ITSON; Attendance: 3,107; Referees: Orlando Varela (HON), Nicolas Zivieri (BRA), Cooper Toppings (CAN)

28 November 2025 2027 FIBA World Cup – Americas Qualifiers First Round	Mexico	85–92	Dominican Republic	Zacatecas, Mexico
20:40	Scoring by quarter: 23–17, 20–25, 15–26, 27–24
	Pts: Cruz 29; Rebs: Bonilla 10; Asts: Cruz 7	Boxscore	Pts: Feliz 21; Rebs: Duarte 8 Asts: Duarte 4	Arena: Gimnasio Marcelino González; Attendance: 3,527; Referees: Andrés Bartel (URU), Daniel García (VEN), Diego Chiconato (BRA)

1 December 2025 2027 FIBA World Cup – Americas Qualifiers First Round	Dominican Republic	88–89	Mexico	Santo Domingo, Dominican Republic
20:10	Scoring by quarter: 28–24, 26–23, 9–20, 25–22
	Pts: Feliz 22; Rebs: Feliz 9 Asts: Montero 8	Boxscore	Pts: Bonilla 20; Rebs: Bonilla 10; Asts: Cruz, Stoll 4	Arena: Pabellón Ricardo Gioriver Arias; Attendance: 3,700; Referees: Julio Anaya (PAN), Waseem Husainy (CAN), Orlando Varela (HON)

=== 2026 ===
26 February 2026 2027 FIBA World Cup – Americas Qualifiers First Round	Nicaragua	72–99	Mexico	Managua, Nicaragua
19:10	Scoring by quarter: 21–22, 10–27, 16–21, 25–29
	Pts: Ruiz 26; Rebs: Pérez 10; Asts: Ruiz 5	Boxscore	Pts: Cruz, Girón 16; Rebs: Girón 11; Asts: Cruz 7	Arena: Polideportivo Alexis Argüello; Referees: Alan dos Santos (BRA), Roberto Fernández (CRC), Nicolas Zivieri (BRA)

1 March 2026 2027 FIBA World Cup – Americas Qualifiers First Round	United States	123–88	Mexico	Oceanside, United States
16:10	Scoring by quarter: 40–14, 31–18, 17–35, 35–21
	Pts: Roddy 20; Rebs: Taylor 10; Asts: Payton 9	Boxscore	Pts: Stoll 25; Rebs: Avila, Gutiérrez 5 Asts: Cruz 6	Arena: Frontwave Arena; Attendance: 3,367; Referees: Julio Anaya (PAN), Carlos Pallares (COL), César Gonçalves (BRA)

3 July 2026 2027 FIBA World Cup – Americas Qualifiers First Round	Mexico	98–79	Nicaragua	Zacatecas, Mexico
20:30	Scoring by quarter: 22–22, 27–19, 25–17, 24–21
	Pts: Bonilla 25; Rebs: Avila 12; Asts: Cruz 6	Boxscore	Pts: Ruiz 19; Rebs: Ruiz 8 Asts: Peralta 4	Arena: Gimnasio Marcelino González; Attendance: 3,200; Referees: Daniel García (VEN), César Gonçalves (BRA), Larissa Rodrigues (BRA)

6 July 2026 2027 FIBA World Cup – Americas Qualifiers First Round	Mexico	93–94	United States	Zacatecas, Mexico
20:00	Scoring by quarter: 27–22, 17–33, 23–16, 26–23
	Pts: Cruz 30; Rebs: Bonilla 16; Asts: Stoll 7	Boxscore	Pts: Craig 23; Rebs: James 8 Asts: James 7	Arena: Gimnasio Marcelino González; Attendance: 3,200; Referees: Andrés Bartel (URU), Danilo Molina (ARG), Carlos Pallares (COL)

27 August 2026 (Note: The order of the games between Colombia and Mexico was reversed due to the 10 August 2026 Colombia earthquake.) 2027 FIBA World Cup – Americas Qualifiers Second Round	Mexico	112–86	Colombia	Zacatecas, Mexico
20:10	Scoring by quarter: 28–25, 26–17, 28–23, 30–21
	Pts: Andriassi 28; Rebs: Gutiérrez 8 Asts: Stoll 6	Boxscore	Pts: Angola 31; Rebs: Echenique, Solís 6 Asts: Atencia 5	Arena: Gimnasio Marcelino González; Attendance: 2,560; Referees: Roberto Vázquez (PUR), Daniel García (VEN), Julirys Guzmán (PUR)

31 August 2026 2027 FIBA World Cup – Americas Qualifiers Second Round	Mexico	79–74	Brazil	Zacatecas, Mexico
20:10	Scoring by quarter: 24–23, 30–21, 13–14, 12–16
	Pts: Cruz 24; Rebs: Avila 15; Asts: Stoll 5	Boxscore	Pts: Meindl 21; Rebs: Galvanini 7 Asts: Neto 7	Arena: Gimnasio Marcelino González; Attendance: 2,894; Referees: Andrés Bartel (URU), Edwin Quiles (PUR), Alexis Mercado (PUR)

27 November 2026 2027 FIBA World Cup – Americas Qualifiers Second Round	Chile	vs.	Mexico	Santiago, Chile
19ː40
				Arena: Coliseo Ismenia Pauchard Demierre

30 November 2026 2027 FIBA World Cup – Americas Qualifiers Second Round	Brazil	vs.	Mexico	São Paulo, Brazil
20ː10
				Arena: Ginásio do Ibirapuera

=== 2027 ===
25 February 2027 2027 FIBA World Cup – Americas Qualifiers Second Round	Colombia	vs.	Mexico	Colombia

28 February 2027 2027 FIBA World Cup – Americas Qualifiers Second Round	Mexico	vs.	Chile	Mexico

== Team ==
=== Current roster ===
The roster for the 2027 FIBA Basketball World Cup qualification (Americas) matches against Colombia on 27 August 2026 and Brazil on 31 August 2026.

Mexico men's national basketball team – 2027 FIBA Basketball World Cup qualification (Americas) roster
Players
Coaches

Pos.	No.	Name	Age – Date of birth	Height	Club	Ctr.
G	0	Karim Rodriguez	38 – 17 January 1988	1.96 m (6 ft 5 in)	Lobos de Puebla	(Mexico)
PG	1	Jaron Martin	31 – 6 March 1995	1.78 m (5 ft 10 in)	Panteras de Aguascalientes	(Mexico)
PG	4	Paul Stoll	40 – 14 December 1985	1.80 m (5 ft 11 in)	El Calor de Cancún	(Mexico)
PF	6	Brayan Martínez	24 – 21 September 2001	2.05 m (6 ft 9 in)	Soles de Mexicali	(Mexico)
SG	7	Moisés Andriassi	26 – 1 March 2000	1.87 m (6 ft 2 in)	Astros de Jalisco	(Mexico)
G	9	Francisco Cruz	36 – 3 October 1989	1.91 m (6 ft 3 in)	Astros de Jalisco	(Mexico)
SF	10	Gabriel Girón (C)	38 – 27 February 1988	1.92 m (6 ft 4 in)	Panteras de Aguascalientes	(Mexico)
F	11	Victor Valdés	22 – 18 June 2004	2.07 m (6 ft 9 in)	Georgia Tech Yellow Jackets	(United States)
PF	15	Jorge Camacho	37 – 16 April 1989	2.05 m (6 ft 9 in)	Lobos de Puebla	(Mexico)
PF	22	Jonatan Machado	32 – 22 October 1993	2.00 m (6 ft 7 in)	Panteras de Aguascalientes	(Mexico)
C	25	Israel Gutiérrez	33 – 15 January 1993	2.06 m (6 ft 9 in)	Lobos de Puebla	(Mexico)
PF	31	J. J. Avila	34 – 11 October 1991	2.03 m (6 ft 8 in)	Dorados de Chihuahua	(Mexico)

Head coach

- (Mexico) Omar Quintero

Assistant coach(es)

- (Mexico) Gustavo Quintero
- (Spain) Xavi Monferrer
- (Puerto Rico) Carlos Morales Jr.

Legend

- (C) Team captain
- Club – describes last
  club before the tournament
- Age – describes age
  on 31 August 2026

=== Previous squads ===
Olympics

- 1936 Olympics squad
- 1948 Olympics squad
- 1952 Olympics squad
- 1960 Olympics squad
- 1964 Olympics squad
- 1968 Olympics squad
- 1976 Olympics squad

FIBA AmeriCup

- 1980 Tournament of the Americas squad
- 1984 Tournament of the Americas squad
- 1988 Tournament of the Americas squad
- 1989 Tournament of the Americas squad
- 1992 Tournament of the Americas squad
- 1993 Tournament of the Americas squad
- 1997 Tournament of the Americas squad
- 2001 Tournament of the Americas squad
- 2003 Tournament of the Americas squad
- 2005 FIBA Americas Championship squad
- 2007 FIBA Americas Championship squad
- 2009 FIBA Americas Championship squad
- 2013 FIBA Americas Championship squad
- 2015 FIBA Americas Championship squad
- 2017 FIBA AmeriCup squad
- 2022 FIBA AmeriCup squad

FIBA World Cup

- 2014 FIBA Basketball World Cup squad
- 2023 FIBA Basketball World Cup squad

=== Head coach position ===
- Augustin Garcia (1959)
- Enrique "Kiki" Romero (1960)
- Pedro Barba Ramos (1963)
- Agustin Garcia Arreola (1964)
- (United States) Lester Lane (1967–1968)
- Pedro Barba Ramos (1974)
- (Mexico) Carlos Bru (1976)
- (Argentina) Guillermo Vecchio (2003)
- (United States) Nolan Richardson (2007)
- (Argentina) Silvio Jose Santander (2008)
- (United States) Nolan Richardson (2009)
- (Mexico) Arturo Guerrero (2009)
- (Spain) Josep Claros (2010–2011)
- (Spain) Sergio Valdeolmillos (2011)
- (Spain) Josep Claros (2012)
- (Mexico) Arturo Guerrero (2013)
- (Spain) Sergio Valdeolmillos (2013–2014)
- (United States) Bill Cartwright (2014–2015)
- (Puerto Rico) Eddie Casiano (2015)
- (Spain) Sergio Valdeolmillos (2015–2017)
- (Spain) Ramón Díaz Sánchez (2018)
- (Spain) Iván Déniz (2018–2019)
- (Spain) Sergio Valdeolmillos (2020–2021)
- (Mexico) Omar Quintero (2021–present)

== Kit ==
=== Manufacturer ===
2015–2021: Under Armour

2022–present: Titan Sports

== See also ==
- Mexico women's national basketball team
- Mexico national under-19 basketball team
- Mexico national under-17 basketball team
- Mexico national 3x3 team
