= 2015 FIBA Americas Championship squads =

These were the rosters of the 10 teams competing at the 2015 FIBA Americas Championship.

== Group A ==
=== Brazil ===
Brazil men's national basketball team roster
Players
Coaches

Pos.	No.	Name	Age – Date of birth	Height	Club
PF	13	J. P. Batista	33 – 29 October 1981	2.06 m (6 ft 9 in)	Flamengo	(Brazil)
SG	8	Vítor Benite (C)	25 – 20 February 1990	1.91 m (6 ft 3 in)	UCAM Murcia	(Spain)
PG	4	Ricardo Fischer	24 – 16 May 1991	1.85 m (6 ft 1 in)	Bauru	(Brazil)
F	12	Guilherme Giovannoni	35 – 2 June 1980	2.03 m (6 ft 8 in)	Brasilia	(Brazil)
C	6	Augusto Lima	23 – 17 September 1991	2.08 m (6 ft 10 in)	UCAM Murcia	(Spain)
G	5	Rafael Luz	23 – 11 February 1992	1.88 m (6 ft 2 in)	Flamengo	(Brazil)
SF	14	Marquinhos	31 – 31 May 1984	2.07 m (6 ft 9 in)	Flamengo	(Brazil)
SF	9	Leonardo Meindl	22 – 20 March 1993	2.01 m (6 ft 7 in)	Bauru	(Brazil)
C	11	Mineiro	27 – 3 June 1988	2.09 m (6 ft 10 in)	Winner Limeira	(Brazil)
F	10	Carlos Olivinha	32 – 18 April 1983	2.03 m (6 ft 8 in)	Flamengo	(Brazil)
PG	7	Deryk Ramos	21 – 14 June 1994	1.88 m (6 ft 2 in)	Winner Limeira	(Brazil)
PF	15	Marcus Toledo	29 – 10 July 1986	2.03 m (6 ft 8 in)	Basquete Cearense	(Brazil)

Head coach

- (Argentina) Rubén Magnano

Assistant coach(es)

- (Brazil) Gustavo De Conti
- (Brazil) José Alves Neto

Legend

- (C) – Team Captain
- Club – describes last
  club before the tournament
- Age – describes age
  on 30 August 2015

=== Dominican Republic ===
Dominican Republic men's national basketball team roster
Players
Coaches

Pos.	No.	Name	Age – Date of birth	Height	Club
F	13	Eulis Báez (C)	33 – 18 March 1982	1.98 m (6 ft 6 in)	Gran Canaria	(Spain)
SG	10	James Feldeine	27 – 26 June 1988	1.93 m (6 ft 4 in)	Panathinaikos	(Greece)
PG	14	Luis Flores	34 – 11 April 1981	1.88 m (6 ft 2 in)	Guaros de Lara	(Venezuela)
SF	9	Francisco García	33 – 31 December 1981	2.00 m (6 ft 7 in)	Houston Rockets	(United States)
PF	15	Juan Jose García	26 – 22 April 1989	2.01 m (6 ft 7 in)	CAI Zaragoza	(Spain)
SG	5	Víctor Liz	29 – 12 May 1986	1.82 m (6 ft 0 in)	Metros de Santiago	(Dominican Republic)
SG	6	Rigoberto Mendoza	23 – 6 July 1992	1.90 m (6 ft 3 in)	Reales de La Vega	(Dominican Republic)
F	12	Orlando Sánchez	27 – 26 May 1988	2.06 m (6 ft 9 in)	Metros de Santiago	(Dominican Republic)
PF	8	Edward Santana	27 – 14 September 1987	2.03 m (6 ft 8 in)	Titanes del Distrito Nacional	(Dominican Republic)
PG	4	Édgar Sosa	27 – 15 January 1988	1.85 m (6 ft 1 in)	Dinamo Sassari	(Italy)
SG	7	Gerardo Suero	26 – 20 April 1989	1.93 m (6 ft 4 in)	Leones de Santo Domingo	(Dominican Republic)
C	11	Eloy Vargas	26 – 30 December 1988	2.11 m (6 ft 11 in)	Metros de Santiago	(Dominican Republic)

Head coach

- (United States) Kenny Atkinson

Assistant coach(es)

- (United States) Bill Bayno
- (United States) Jordan Ott
- (Dominican Republic) David Diaz

Legend

- (C) – Team Captain
- Club – describes last
  club before the tournament
- Age – describes age
  on 30 August 2015

=== Mexico ===
Mexico men's national basketball team roster
Players
Coaches

Pos.	No.	Name	Age – Date of birth	Height	Club
PG	4	Paul Stoll	29 – 14 December 1985	1.80 m (5 ft 11 in)	Halcones Rojos Veracruz	(Mexico)
F	5	Marco Ramos	28 – 26 February 1987	1.98 m (6 ft 6 in)	Halcones Rojos Veracruz	(Mexico)
SF	6	Juan Anderson	22 – 10 April 1993	1.98 m (6 ft 6 in)	Marquette Golden Eagles	(United States)
PG	7	Jorge Gutiérrez	26 – 27 December 1988	1.91 m (6 ft 3 in)	Milwaukee Bucks	(United States)
C	8	Gustavo Ayón (C)	30 – 1 April 1985	2.07 m (6 ft 9 in)	Real Madrid Baloncesto	(Spain)
G/F	9	Francisco Cruz	25 – 3 October 1989	1.91 m (6 ft 3 in)	BK VEF Rīga	(Latvia)
SG	10	Gabriel Girón	27 – 27 February 1988	1.90 m (6 ft 3 in)	Fuerza Regia	(Mexico)
PG	11	Pedro Meza	29 – 15 October 1985	1.86 m (6 ft 1 in)	Caballeros de Culiacán	(Mexico)
PF	12	Héctor Hernández	30 – 15 June 1985	2.05 m (6 ft 9 in)	Pioneros de Quintana Roo	(Mexico)
SG	13	Orlando Méndez-Valdez	29 – 29 April 1986	1.83 m (6 ft 0 in)	Halcones de Xalapa	(Mexico)
F/C	14	Rodrigo Adrián Zamora	28 – 28 October 1986	2.06 m (6 ft 9 in)	Halcones Rojos Veracruz	(Mexico)
C	15	Israel Gutiérrez	22 – 15 January 1993	2.06 m (6 ft 9 in)	Caballeros de Culiacán	(Mexico)

Head coach

- (Spain) Sergio Valdeolmillos

Assistant coach(es)

- (Spain) Ramón Diaz
- (Mexico) Javier Ceniceros
- (Mexico) Mateo Rubio

Legend

- (C) – Team Captain
- Club – describes last
  club before the tournament
- Age – describes age
  on 30 August 2015

=== Panama ===
Panama men's national basketball team roster
Players
Coaches

Pos.	No.	Name	Age – Date of birth	Height	Club
SF	10	Josimar Ayarza	28 – 3 May 1987	2.05 m (6 ft 9 in)	Culiacán	(Mexico)
F/C	15	Rubén Garcés	41 – 17 October 1973	2.06 m (6 ft 9 in)	Club Malvin	(Uruguay)
PG	5	Trevor Gaskins	25 – 24 November 1989	1.88 m (6 ft 2 in)	Estudiantes Bahía Blanca	(Argentina)
G/F	11	Michael Hicks (C)	39 – 4 August 1976	1.96 m (6 ft 5 in)	Hebraica y Macabi	(Uruguay)
F	7	Jamelle Horne	26 – 4 November 1988	2.00 m (6 ft 7 in)	Toyama Grouses	(Japan)
G/F	8	Jonathan King	25 – 25 January 1990	1.98 m (6 ft 6 in)	Cojute	(El Salvador)
F/C	9	Jamaal Levy	32 – 8 January 1983	2.06 m (6 ft 9 in)	Estudiantes Bahía Blanca	(Argentina)
F/C	14	Jose Lloreda	34 – 10 November 1980	2.06 m (6 ft 9 in)	Atenienses de Manatí	(Puerto Rico)
PG	4	Joel Muñoz	35 – 24 June 1980	1.83 m (6 ft 0 in)	Leones de Managua	(Nicaragua)
SF	12	Ernesto Oglivie	26 – 30 June 1989	1.99 m (6 ft 6 in)	San Marcos	(El Salvador)
SG	6	J. R. Pinnock	31 – 11 December 1983	1.96 m (6 ft 5 in)	Huracanes del Atlántico	(Dominican Republic)
PF	13	Gyno Pomare	29 – 5 April 1986	2.04 m (6 ft 8 in)	Aomori Wat's	(Japan)

Head coach

- (Puerto Rico) David Rosario

Assistant coach(es)

- (Panama) Mario Butler
- (Panama) Luis Julio

Legend

- (C) – Team Captain
- Club – describes last
  club before the tournament
- Age – describes age
  on 30 August 2015

=== Uruguay ===
Uruguay men's national basketball team roster
Players
Coaches

Pos.	No.	Name	Age – Date of birth	Height	Club	Ctr.
SF	6	Mauricio Aguiar	32 – 3 February 1983	1.98 m (6 ft 6 in)	Obras	(Argentina)
SG	41	Demian Alvarez	30 – 19 October 1984	1.93 m (6 ft 4 in)	Atletico Aguada	(Uruguay)
PF	14	Nicolas Borsellino	29 – 8 May 1986	2.02 m (6 ft 8 in)	Atletico Aguada	(Uruguay)
PF	13	Hernando Caceres	21 – 22 August 1994	2.01 m (6 ft 7 in)	Club Atletico Goes	(Uruguay)
C	7	Mathías Calfani	23 – 21 January 1992	2.02 m (6 ft 8 in)	Club Malvín	(Uruguay)
PG	5	Bruno Fitipaldo	24 – 2 August 1991	1.83 m (6 ft 0 in)	Obras	(Argentina)
C	22	Reque Newsome	33 – 8 October 1981	2.04 m (6 ft 8 in)	Club Malvín	(Uruguay)
G	11	Martín Osimani (C)	34 – 22 May 1981	1.95 m (6 ft 5 in)	Defensor Sporting	(Uruguay)
PG	21	Luciano Parodi	21 – 16 February 1994	1.82 m (6 ft 0 in)	Hebraica y Macabi	(Uruguay)
F	10	Marcel Souberbielle	23 – 29 November 1991	2.00 m (6 ft 7 in)	Club Malvín	(Uruguay)
PG	4	Santiago Vidal	26 – 5 June 1989	1.80 m (5 ft 11 in)	Club Trouville	(Uruguay)
F/C	33	Kiril Wachsmann	30 – 11 November 1984	2.03 m (6 ft 8 in)	Melilla Baloncesto	(Spain)

Head coach

- (Argentina) Adrián Capelli

Assistant coach(es)

- (Uruguay) Federico Camina
- (Uruguay) Javier Isis

Legend

- (C) – Team Captain
- Club – describes last
  club before the tournament
- Age – describes age
  on 30 August 2015

== Group B ==
=== Argentina ===
Argentina men's national basketball team roster
Players
Coaches

Pos.	No.	Name	Age – Date of birth	Height	Club
SG	9	Nicolás Brussino	22 – 2 March 1993	2.04 m (6 ft 8 in)	Peñarol	(Argentina)
PG	7	Facundo Campazzo	24 – 23 March 1991	1.79 m (5 ft 10 in)	Real Madrid	(Spain)
SF	14	Gabriel Deck	20 – 8 February 1995	2.00 m (6 ft 7 in)	Quilmes	(Argentina)
C	12	Marcos Delía	23 – 8 April 1992	2.09 m (6 ft 10 in)	Obras Sanitarias	(Argentina)
F/C	83	Tayavek Gallizzi	22 – 8 February 1993	2.05 m (6 ft 9 in)	Quilmes	(Argentina)
G/F	29	Patricio Garino	22 – 17 May 1993	1.98 m (6 ft 6 in)	George Washington University	(United States)
PG	8	Nicolás Laprovíttola	25 – 31 January 1990	1.90 m (6 ft 3 in)	Lietuvos Rytas	(Lithuania)
PF	19	Leo Mainoldi	30 – 4 March 1985	2.04 m (6 ft 8 in)	Gimnasia Indalo	(Argentina)
SF	13	Andrés Nocioni	35 – 30 November 1979	2.02 m (6 ft 8 in)	Real Madrid	(Spain)
G	5	Nicolás Richotti	28 – 30 October 1986	1.84 m (6 ft 0 in)	CB Canarias	(Spain)
SG	15	Selem Safar	28 – 6 May 1987	1.92 m (6 ft 4 in)	Obras Sanitarias	(Argentina)
PF	4	Luis Scola	35 – 30 April 1980	2.06 m (6 ft 9 in)	Toronto Raptors	(Canada)

Head coach

- (Argentina) Sergio Hernandez

Legend

- (C) – Team Captain
- Club – describes last
  club before the tournament
- Age – describes age
  on 30 August 2015

=== Canada ===
Canada men's national basketball team roster
Players
Coaches

Pos.	No.	Name	Age – Date of birth	Height	Club
F	10	Anthony Bennett	22 – March 14, 1993	6 ft 8 in (2.03 m)	Minnesota Timberwolves	(United States)
F	11	Aaron Doornekamp	29 – December 5, 1985	6 ft 7 in (2.01 m)	Skyliners Frankfurt	(Germany)
SF	6	Melvin Ejim	24 – March 4, 1991	6 ft 6 in (1.98 m)	Orlando Magic	(United States)
SG	12	Brady Heslip	25 – June 19, 1990	6 ft 1 in (1.85 m)	Pallacanestro Cantù	(Italy)
PG	5	Cory Joseph (C)	23 – September 20, 1991	6 ft 3 in (1.91 m)	Toronto Raptors	(Canada)
PF	7	Andrew Nicholson	25 – December 8, 1989	6 ft 9 in (2.06 m)	Orlando Magic	(United States)
C	13	Kelly Olynyk	24 – April 19, 1991	7 ft 0 in (2.13 m)	Boston Celtics	(United States)
PF	14	Dwight Powell	24 – July 20, 1991	6 ft 11 in (2.11 m)	Dallas Mavericks	(United States)
C	15	Robert Sacre	26 – June 6, 1989	7 ft 0 in (2.13 m)	Los Angeles Lakers	(United States)
G	4	Philip Scrubb	22 – November 27, 1992	6 ft 3 in (1.91 m)	AEK	(Greece)
SG	9	Nik Stauskas	21 – October 7, 1993	6 ft 6 in (1.98 m)	Philadelphia 76ers	(United States)
SF	8	Andrew Wiggins	20 – February 23, 1995	6 ft 8 in (2.03 m)	Minnesota Timberwolves	(United States)

Head coach

- (Canada) Jay Triano

Assistant coach(es)

- (Canada) Bryan Gates
- (Canada) David Smart
- (United States) David Vanterpool

Legend

- (C) – Team Captain
- Club – describes last
  club before the tournament
- Age – describes age
  on 30 August 2015

=== Cuba ===
Cuba men's national basketball team roster
Players
Coaches

Pos.	No.	Name	Age – Date of birth	Height	Club
F/C	16	Yoel Cubilla	20 – 25 December 1994	2.04 m (6 ft 8 in)	Ciego de Avila	(Cuba)
SG	10	William Granda (C)	30 – 8 August 1985	1.89 m (6 ft 2 in)	Club Atlético Tabaré	(Uruguay)
G/F	4	Karel Guzman	20 – 7 February 1995	1.88 m (6 ft 2 in)	Capitalinos	(Cuba)
C	12	Joan Luis Haiti	33 – 20 April 1982	2.00 m (6 ft 7 in)	Ciego de Avila	(Cuba)
C	6	Javier Justiz	22 – 18 September 1992	2.05 m (6 ft 9 in)	Estudiantes Concordia	(Argentina)
SF	13	Esteban Martinez	28 – 8 May 1987	1.92 m (6 ft 4 in)	Santiago de Cuba	(Cuba)
PG	11	Yuniskel Molina	22 – 28 March 1993	1.85 m (6 ft 1 in)	Pinar del Rio	(Cuba)
PG	5	Osmel Oliva	28 – 24 April 1987	1.78 m (5 ft 10 in)	Artemisa	(Cuba)
PF	15	Jasiel Rivero	21 – 31 October 1993	2.04 m (6 ft 8 in)	Club Atlético Tabaré	(Uruguay)
G	7	Yaser Rodriguez	27 – 1 January 1988	1.86 m (6 ft 1 in)	Ciego de Avila	(Cuba)
PF	14	Orestes Torres	28 – 26 February 1987	2.03 m (6 ft 8 in)	Capitalinos	(Cuba)
SF	9	Livan Valdez	27 – 21 January 1988	1.95 m (6 ft 5 in)	Capitalinos	(Cuba)

Head coach

- (Cuba) Daniel Scott

Legend

- (C) – Team Captain
- Club – describes last
  club before the tournament
- Age – describes age
  on 30 August 2015

=== Puerto Rico ===
Puerto Rico men's national basketball team roster
Players
Coaches

Pos.	No.	Name	Age – Date of birth	Height	Club
SG	10	Elías Larry Ayuso	38 – 27 March 1977	1.88 m (6 ft 2 in)	Mets de Guaynabo	(Puerto Rico)
PF	13	Renaldo Balkman	31 – 14 July 1984	2.03 m (6 ft 8 in)	Capitanes Arecibo	(Puerto Rico)
PG	5	José Juan Barea (C)	31 – 26 June 1984	1.83 m (6 ft 0 in)	Dallas Mavericks	(United States)
G/F	6	Richard Chaney	31 – 23 January 1984	1.96 m (6 ft 5 in)	Mets de Guaynabo	(Puerto Rico)
PF	1	Ramon Clemente	29 – 11 December 1985	2.01 m (6 ft 7 in)	Obras Sanitarias	(Argentina)
G	2	Guillermo Diaz	30 – 4 March 1985	1.89 m (6 ft 2 in)	Capitanes Arecibo	(Puerto Rico)
C	9	Jorge Brian Díaz	25 – 13 November 1989	2.11 m (6 ft 11 in)	Mets de Guaynabo	(Puerto Rico)
PG	7	Javier Gonzalez	26 – 15 April 1989	1.82 m (6 ft 0 in)	Cangrejeros Santurce	(Puerto Rico)
G/F	23	John Holland	26 – 6 November 1988	1.98 m (6 ft 6 in)	Beşiktaş	(Turkey)
PG	31	Carlos Rivera	32 – 5 February 1983	1.88 m (6 ft 2 in)	Leones Ponce	(Puerto Rico)
SF	8	Ángel Daniel Vassallo	29 – 2 April 1986	1.98 m (6 ft 6 in)	STB Le Havre	(France)
C	11	Luis Villafañe	34 – 21 June 1981	2.08 m (6 ft 10 in)	Indios Mayagüez	(Puerto Rico)

Head coach

- (United States) Rick Pitino

Assistant coach(es)

- (United States) Michael Balado
- (Puerto Rico) Nelson Colon
- (Puerto Rico) Richie Dalmau

Legend

- (C) – Team Captain
- Club – describes last
  club before the tournament
- Age – describes age
  on 30 August 2015

=== Venezuela ===
Venezuela men's national basketball team roster
Players
Coaches

Pos.	No.	Name	Age – Date of birth	Height	Club	Ctr.
PF	43	Néstor Colmenares	27 – 5 September 1987	2.03 m (6 ft 8 in)	Cocodrilos de Caracas	(Venezuela)
SG	6	John Cox	34 – 7 June 1981	1.94 m (6 ft 4 in)	STB Le Havre	(France)
PG	8	David Cubillán	28 – 27 July 1987	1.81 m (5 ft 11 in)	Trotamundos de Carabobo	(Venezuela)
G	11	César García	26 – 11 February 1989	1.75 m (5 ft 9 in)	Cocodrilos de Caracas	(Venezuela)
F/C	15	Windi Graterol	28 – 10 September 1986	2.04 m (6 ft 8 in)	Guaros de Lara	(Venezuela)
PG	19	Heissler Guillént	28 – 17 December 1986	1.86 m (6 ft 1 in)	Guaros de Lara	(Venezuela)
G/F	21	Dwight Lewis	27 – 7 October 1987	1.97 m (6 ft 6 in)	Trotamundos de Carabobo	(Venezuela)
C	4	Miguel Marriaga	31 – 6 June 1984	2.06 m (6 ft 9 in)	Toros de Aragua	(Venezuela)
SF	14	Miguel Ruiz	24 – 20 December 1990	2.02 m (6 ft 8 in)	Trotamundos de Carabobo	(Venezuela)
PG	5	Gregory Vargas	29 – 18 February 1986	1.80 m (5 ft 11 in)	Maccabi Haifa B.C.	(Israel)
C	12	Javinger Vargas	25 – 5 March 1990	2.06 m (6 ft 9 in)	Trotamundos de Carabobo	(Venezuela)
G/F	10	José Vargas (C)	33 – 23 January 1982	1.95 m (6 ft 5 in)	Marinos de Anzoátegui	(Venezuela)

Head coach

- (Argentina) Néstor García

Assistant coach(es)

- (Venezuela) Nelson Solórzano
- (Venezuela) Daniel Seoane

Legend

- (C) – Team Captain
- Club – describes last
  club before the tournament
- Age – describes age
  on 30 August 2015
