= Basketball at the 2011 Pan American Games – Men's team rosters =

This article shows the rosters of all participating teams at the men's basketball tournament at the 2011 Pan American Games in Guadalajara, Mexico. Rosters can have a maximum of 12 players.

== Group A ==
=== Canada ===
The Canada men's national basketball team roster for the 2011 Pan American Games.

Canada men's national basketball team – 2011 Pan American Games roster
Players
Coaches

| Pos. | No. | Name | Age – Date of birth | Height | Club |
|---|---|---|---|---|---|
| G | 4 | Jones, Jahmal | 20 – Feb 23, 1991 | 6 ft 1 in (1.85 m) | (Canada) Ryerson University |
| G/F | 5 | Yu, Nathan | 22 – Jun 27, 1989 | 6 ft 2 in (1.88 m) | (Canada) Univ. of British Columbia |
| G/F | 8 | Desmarais, Kyle | 23 – Dec 27, 1987 | 6 ft 2 in (1.88 m) | (Canada) Concordia University |
| G/F | 6 | Scrubb, Philip | 18 – Nov 27, 1992 | 6 ft 3 in (1.91 m) | (Canada) Carleton University |
| F | 13 | Baker, Jordan Douglas | 20 – Aug 26, 1991 | 6 ft 6 in (1.98 m) | (Canada) University of Alberta |
| F/C | 9 | Lieffers, Michael | 24 – Apr 16, 1987 | 6 ft 8 in (2.03 m) | (Canada) University of Saskatchewan |
| F | 10 | Ward, Warren | 21 – Nov 16, 1989 | 6 ft 5 in (1.96 m) | (Canada) University of Ottawa |
| F | 11 | Hobin, Cole | 22 – Feb 15, 1989 | 6 ft 5 in (1.96 m) | (Canada) Carleton University |
| G | 12 | Hinz, Tyson | 19 – Dec 10, 1991 | 6 ft 7 in (2.01 m) | (Canada) Carleton University |
| F/C | 14 | Phillip, Lien | 22 – Oct 25, 1989 | 6 ft 8 in (2.03 m) | (Canada) University of Windsor |
| C | 15 | Klassen, Owen | 19 – Oct 31, 1991 | 6 ft 9 in (2.06 m) | (Canada) Acadia University |
| F | 7 | Harrison, Kale | 23 – Sep 26, 1988 | 6 ft 5 in (1.96 m) | (Canada) Wilfrid Laurier University |

Head coach

- David Smart

Assistant coach(es)

- David Deaveiro
- Craig Beauchamp

Legend

- Age – as of Oct 26, 2011
- Club – before start of Games

=== Mexico ===
The Mexico men's national basketball team roster for the 2011 Pan American Games.

Mexico men's national basketball team – 2011 Pan American Games roster
Players
Coaches

| Pos. | No. | Name | Age – Date of birth | Height | Club |
|---|---|---|---|---|---|
| G | 4 | Stoll, Paul | 25 – Dec 14, 1985 | 1.78 m (5 ft 10 in) | (Mexico) Halcones Rojos Veracruz |
| G/F | 6 | Meza, Pedro | 26 – Oct 15, 1985 | 1.85 m (6 ft 1 in) | (Mexico) Soles de Mexicali |
| G | 7 | Hernández, Christopher | 28 – Mar 17, 1983 | 1.85 m (6 ft 1 in) | (Mexico) Halcones de Xalapa |
| C | 8 | Parada, Adam | 30 – Oct 21, 1981 | 2.13 m (7 ft 0 in) | (Mexico) Halcones de Xalapa |
| F/C | 9 | Strobbe, Michael | 27 – Sep 30, 1984 | 2.03 m (6 ft 8 in) | (Mexico) Fuerza Regia de Monterrey |
| F | 10 | Mariscal, Víctor | 39 – May 24, 1972 | 1.98 m (6 ft 6 in) | (Mexico) Halcones de Xalapa |
| G/F | 11 | Quintero, Omar | 30 – Sep 26, 1981 | 1.80 m (5 ft 11 in) | (Mexico) Huracanes de Tampico |
| F/C | 12 | Hernandez, Hector | 26 – Jun 15, 1985 | 2.03 m (6 ft 8 in) | (Mexico) Halcones de Xalapa |
| C | 14 | Real, Lorenzo | 25 – Feb 27, 1986 | 2.08 m (6 ft 10 in) | (Mexico) Halcones de Xalapa |
| F/C | 15 | Lopez, Jesus | 27 – Dec 28, 1983 | 2.02 m (6 ft 8 in) | (United States) Austin Toros |
| G/F | 13 | Mendez, Orlando | 25 – Apr 19, 1986 | 1.83 m (6 ft 0 in) | (Mexico) Halcones de Xalapa |
| G/F | 5 | Harris, Jovan | 30 – Feb 20, 1981 | 1.85 m (6 ft 1 in) | (Mexico) Abejas de León |

Head coach

- Sergio Valdeolmillos

Assistant coach(es)

- Ignacio Moreno
- Luis Manuel Lopez
- Angel Alfredo Gonzalez

Legend

- Age – as of Oct 26, 2011
- Club – before start of Games

=== Puerto Rico ===
The Puerto Rico men's national basketball team roster for the 2011 Pan American Games.

Puerto Rico men's national basketball team – 2011 Pan American Games roster
Players
Coaches

| Pos. | No. | Name | Age – Date of birth | Height | Club |
|---|---|---|---|---|---|
| G | 7 | Arroyo, Carlos | 32 – Jul 30, 1979 | 1.86 m (6 ft 1 in) | (United States) Boston Celtics |
| F/C | 12 | Balkman, Renaldo | 27 – Jun 14, 1984 | 2.03 m (6 ft 8 in) |
| G | 5 | Barea, José Juan | 27 – Jun 26, 1984 | 1.80 m (5 ft 11 in) | (United States) Dallas Mavericks |
| G | 9 | Berdiel, Miguel | 27 – Dec 24, 1983 | 1.98 m (6 ft 6 in) |
| F | 10 | Colón, Gabriel | 26 – Dec 20, 1984 | 2.00 m (6 ft 7 in) |
| F/C | 13 | De Jesús, Manuel | 28 – Mar 4, 1983 | 2.03 m (6 ft 8 in) |
| C | 12 | Narvaez, Manuel | 29 – Dec 18, 1981 | 2.08 m (6 ft 10 in) | (Puerto Rico) Maratonistas de Coamo |
| G | 6 | Rivera, Filiberto | 29 – Sep 28, 1982 | 1.88 m (6 ft 2 in) | (Israel) Bnei HaSharon |
| C | 15 | Santiago, Daniel | 35 – Jun 24, 1976 | 2.13 m (7 ft 0 in) | (Belgium) Spirou Charleroi |
| F | 4 | Strong, Carlos | 24 – Oct 20, 1987 | 1.95 m (6 ft 5 in) |
| F/C | 14 | Ubiles, Edwin | 24 – Nov 26, 1986 | 2.06 m (6 ft 9 in) |
| C | 11 | Villafañe, Luis | 30 – Jun 21, 1981 | 2.08 m (6 ft 10 in) | (Puerto Rico) Cangreieros de Santurce |

Head coach

- Flor Meléndez

Assistant coach(es)

- Carlos Morales
- Carlos Calcaño

Legend

- Age – as of Oct 26, 2011
- Club – before start of Games

=== Argentina ===
The Argentina men's national basketball team roster for the 2011 Pan American Games.

Argentina men's national basketball team – 2011 Pan American Games roster
Players
Coaches

| Pos. | No. | Name | Age – Date of birth | Height | Club |
|---|---|---|---|---|---|
| G | 14 | Laprovíttola, Nicolás | 21 – Jan 31, 1990 | 1.86 m (6 ft 1 in) | (Argentina) Lanús |
| G | 10 | Cequeira, Luis | 26 – Feb 4, 1985 | 1.80 m (5 ft 11 in) | (Argentina) Sionista |
| G | 5 | Fernández, Juan | 21 – Jul 22, 1990 | 1.94 m (6 ft 4 in) | (United States) Temple University |
| G/F | 8 | González, Luciano | 21 – Jan 1, 1990 | 1.91 m (6 ft 3 in) | (Brazil) Pinheiros |
| G/F | 15 | Fernández Chavez, Juan | 20 – Apr 30, 1991 | 1.97 m (6 ft 6 in) | (Argentina) Libertad |
| F | 6 | Elsener, Alexis | 23 – Feb 23, 1988 | 1.95 m (6 ft 5 in) | (Argentina) Obras Sanitarias |
| F | 13 | Gerlero, Miguel | 23 – Sep 1, 1988 | 1.99 m (6 ft 6 in) | (Argentina) Atenas |
| G/F | 9 | Espinoza, Pablo | 24 – Mar 21, 1987 | 1.98 m (6 ft 6 in) | (Argentina) Obras Sanitarias |
| F/C | 4 | Romano, Nicolás | 24 – Jan 11, 1987 | 2.00 m (6 ft 7 in) | (Argentina) Regatas |
| C | 12 | Delía, Marcos | 19 – Aug 4, 1992 | 2.06 m (6 ft 9 in) | (Argentina) Boca Juniors |
| C | 11 | Alloatti, Alejandro | 26 – Nov 29, 1984 | 2.05 m (6 ft 9 in) | (Argentina) Libertad |
| F/C | 7 | Sandes, Matías | 27 – Jun 14, 1984 | 2.01 m (6 ft 7 in) | (Argentina) Sionista |

Head coach

- Enrique Tolcachier

Assistant coach(es)

- Facundo Müller

Legend

- Age – as of Oct 26, 2011
- Club – before start of Games

== Group B ==
=== Dominican Republic ===
The Dominican Republic men's national basketball team roster for the 2011 Pan American Games.

Dominican Republic men's national basketball team – 2011 Pan American Games roster
Players
Coaches

| Pos. | No. | Name | Age – Date of birth | Height | Club |
|---|---|---|---|---|---|
| G/F | 4 | Coronado Gil, Juan | 28 – 25 Aug 1983 | 6 ft 0 in (1.83 m) |
| C | 11 | Guzman Garcia, Elys Manuel | 26 – 24 Aug 1985 | 6 ft 9 in (2.06 m) |
| G | 6 | Guzman, Luis | 24 – 7 Oct 1987 | 6 ft 3 in (1.91 m) |
| G/F | 5 | Liz, Victor Antonio | 24 – 5 Dec 1986 | 5 ft 11 in (1.8 m) |
| F/C | 14 | Montas, Cristian Alexis | 31 – 9 Nov 1979 | 6 ft 7 in (2.01 m) |
| G/F | 8 | Montas, Juan Pablo | 26 – 10 Nov 1984 | 6 ft 4 in (1.93 m) |
| G/F | 9 | Peña, Kelvin Abrahan | 31 – 10 May 1980 | 6 ft 2 in (1.88 m) |
| G/F | 7 | Soliver, Ricardo | 27 – 20 Apr 1984 | 6 ft 1 in (1.85 m) |
| G/F | 15 | Martinez, Yack Michael | 29 – 10 Dec 1981 | 6 ft 9 in (2.06 m) |
| G/F | 10 | Acosta, Giancarlos | 27 – 6 May 1984 | 6 ft 3 in (1.91 m) |
| G | 12 | Ozuna, Francisco | 32 – 4 Oct 1979 | 6 ft 0 in (1.83 m) |
| C | 13 | Encarnacion, Sandro | 25 – 20 Sep 1986 | 6 ft 7 in (2.01 m) |

Head coach

- Hubbard, Philip Gregory

Assistant coach(es)

- Baez, Hector Jacinto

Legend

- Age – as of 26 Oct 2011
- Club – before start of Games

=== Brazil ===
The Brazil men's national basketball team roster for the 2011 Pan American Games.

Brazil men's national basketball team – 2011 Pan American Games roster
Players
Coaches

| Pos. | No. | Name | Age – Date of birth | Height | Club |
|---|---|---|---|---|---|
| G/F | 4 | Machado, Marcelo | 35 – 4 Dec 1975 | 2.00 m (6 ft 7 in) | (Brazil) Flamengo |
| G | 5 | Santos, Wellington | 30 – 21 Jan 1981 | 1.88 m (6 ft 2 in) | (Brazil) Brasilia/Universo |
| C | 6 | Da Rosa, Murilo | 28 – 14 Jul 1983 | 2.06 m (6 ft 9 in) | (Brazil) São José |
| F | 11 | Irigoyen, Bruno | 19 – 16 Apr 1992 | 1.98 m (6 ft 6 in) | (Brazil) Minas T.C. |
| G/F | 8 | Benite, Vítor | 21 – 20 Feb 1990 | 1.90 m (6 ft 3 in) | (Brazil) Winner Limeira |
| G | 9 | Rossetto, Davi | 19 – 27 Jul 1992 | 1.80 m (5 ft 11 in) | (Brazil) E.C. Pinheiros |
| F | 10 | Silva, Arthur Luiz | 29 – 30 Sep 1982 | 1.96 m (6 ft 5 in) | (Brazil) Brasilia |
| C | 14 | Felicio, Cristiano | 19 – 7 Jul 1992 | 2.06 m (6 ft 9 in) | (Brazil) Minas T.C. |
| F/C | 13 | Alves, Lucas | 25 – 14 Jun 1986 | 2.02 m (6 ft 8 in) | (Brazil) Uberlandia |
| F/C | 12 | Giovannoni, Guilherme | 31 – 6 Feb 1980 | 2.03 m (6 ft 8 in) | (Brazil) Brasilia/Universo |
| G/F | 7 | Duarte, Jose Roberto | 23 – 24 May 1988 | 1.95 m (6 ft 5 in) | (Brazil) Paulistano/Amil |
| C | 15 | Hubner, Guilherme | 24 – 28 Apr 1987 | 2.06 m (6 ft 9 in) | (Brazil) Minas |

Head coach

- Magnano, Ruben

Assistant coach

- Dos Santos Neto, Jose

Legend

- Age – as of 26 Oct 2011
- Club – before start of Games

=== Uruguay ===
The Uruguay men's national basketball team roster for the 2011 Pan American Games.

Uruguay men's national basketball team – 2011 Pan American Games roster
Players
Coaches

| Pos. | No. | Name | Age – Date of birth | Height | Club |
|---|---|---|---|---|---|
| PG | 11 | Osimani, Martín | 30 – 22 May 1981 | 1.94 m (6 ft 4 in) | (Argentina) Obras Sanitarias |
| PG | 8 | Fitipaldo, Bruno | 20 – 2 Aug 1991 | 1.84 m (6 ft 0 in) | (Uruguay) Club Malvín |
| PG | | Vidal, Santiago | – | | (Uruguay) Club Biguá |
| | | Osimani, Joaquin | – | | (Uruguay) Club Malvín |
| | | Silvera, Juan Pablo | – | | (Uruguay) Defensor Sporting |
| PF | 13 | Vázquez, Sebastián | 26 – 4 Sep 1985 | 2.03 m (6 ft 8 in) | (Uruguay) Club Malvín |
| PF | | Loriente, Iván | – | | (Uruguay) Club Biguá |
| PF | 9 | Izaguirre, Sebastián | 25 – 4 Dec 1985 | 2.07 m (6 ft 9 in) | (Uruguay) Defensor Sporting |
| PF | 14 | Borsellino, Nicolás | 25 – 8 May 1986 | 2.02 m (6 ft 8 in) | (Uruguay) Club Malvín |
| PF | | Bastón, Emiliano | – | | (Uruguay) Hebraica y Macabi |
| C | 12 | Newsome, Reque | 30 – 8 Oct 1981 | 2.04 m (6 ft 8 in) | (Uruguay) Club Malvín |
| C | 7 | Calfani, Mathías | 19 – 21 Jan 1992 | 2.05 m (6 ft 9 in) | (Uruguay) Club Biguá |

Head coach

- Alvaro Tito

Legend

- Age – as of 26 Oct 2011
- Club – before start of Games

=== United States ===
The United States men's national basketball team roster for the 2011 Pan American Games.

United States men's national basketball team – 2011 Pan American Games roster
Players
Coaches

| Pos. | No. | Name | Age – Date of birth | Height | Club |
|---|---|---|---|---|---|
| G | 4 | Ahearn, Blake | 27 – May 27, 1984 | 6 ft 2 in (1.88 m) | (United States) Erie BayHawks |
| G | 5 | Dentmon, Justin | 26 – Sep 5, 1985 | 6 ft 0 in (1.83 m) | (United States) Texas Legends |
| G/F | 6 | Dyson, Jerome | 24 – May 1, 1987 | 6 ft 3 in (1.91 m) | (United States) Tulsa 66ers |
| G/F | 7 | Ehambe, Moses | 25 – May 22, 1986 | 6 ft 6 in (1.98 m) | (United States) Iowa Energy |
| G/F | 8 | Sloan, Donald | 29 – May 7, 1982 | 6 ft 3 in (1.91 m) | (United States) Reno Bighorns |
| F | 9 | Major, Renaldo | 29 – May 7, 1982 | 6 ft 6 in (1.98 m) | (United States) Dakota Wizards |
| F | 10 | Sumpter, Curtis | 27 – Jan 30, 1984 | 6 ft 7 in (2.01 m) | (United States) NBA D-League TBD |
| F/C | 11 | Lyons, Leo | 24 – May 6, 1987 | 6 ft 9 in (2.06 m) | (United States) Austin Toros |
| F | 12 | Thomas, Lance | 23 – Aug 24, 1988 | 6 ft 8 in (2.03 m) | (United States) Austin Toros |
| F/C | 13 | Lewis, Marcus | 25 – Aug 5, 1986 | 6 ft 8 in (2.03 m) | (United States) Tulsa 66ers |
| C | 14 | Butch, Brian | 26 – Dec 22, 1984 | 6 ft 11 in (2.11 m) | (United States) Bakersfield Jam |
| C | 15 | Stiemsma, Gregory | 26 – Sep 26, 1985 | 6 ft 11 in (2.11 m) | (United States) Sioux Falls Skyforce |

Head coach

- Tibbetts, Nathan Moe

Assistant coach(es)

- Osbourne, Dale Austin
- Byrd, Jermaine A.

Legend

- Age – as of Oct 26, 2011
- Club – before start of Games
