= 2013 FIBA Americas Championship squads =

These were the rosters of the 10 teams competing at the 2013 FIBA Americas Championship.

== Group A ==
=== Brazil ===
Brazil men's national basketball team roster
Players
Coaches

Pos.	No.	Name	Age – Date of birth	Height	Club	Ctr.
G	4	Arthur Silva	30 – 30 September 1982	1.96 m (6 ft 5 in)	UniCEUB/BRB	(Brazil)
G	5	Rafael Luz	21 – 11 February 1992	1.90 m (6 ft 3 in)	Obradoiro CAB	(Spain)
G	6	Raulzinho Neto	21 – 19 May 1992	1.85 m (6 ft 1 in)	Lagun Aro	(Spain)
G	7	Larry Taylor	32 – 3 October 1980	1.85 m (6 ft 1 in)	Bauru	(Brazil)
G	8	Vítor Benite	23 – 20 February 1990	1.90 m (6 ft 3 in)	Flamengo	(Brazil)
G	9	Marcelinho Huertas	30 – 25 May 1983	1.91 m (6 ft 3 in)	FC Barcelona	(Spain)
G/F	10	Alex Garcia	33 – 4 March 1980	1.92 m (6 ft 4 in)	UniCEUB/BRB	(Brazil)
F/C	11	Rafael Hettsheimeir	27 – 16 June 1986	2.08 m (6 ft 10 in)	Unicaja Málaga	(Spain)
F	12	Guilherme Giovannoni	33 – 2 June 1980	2.04 m (6 ft 8 in)	UniCEUB/BRB	(Brazil)
C	13	Caio Torres	26 – 3 June 1987	2.11 m (6 ft 11 in)	São José	(Brazil)
F	14	Cristiano Felicio	21 – 7 July 1992	2.06 m (6 ft 9 in)	Minas Tênis Clube	(Brazil)
F	15	J.P. Batista	31 – 29 October 1981	2.06 m (6 ft 9 in)	Le Mans Sarthe Basket	(France)

Head coach

- (Argentina) Rubén Magnano

Assistant coach(es)

- (Brazil) Demétrius Ferraciú
- (Brazil) José Alves Neto

Legend

- Club – describes last
  club before the tournament
- Age – describes age
  on 30 August 2013

=== Canada ===
Canada men's national basketball team roster
Players
Coaches

Pos.	No.	Name	Age – Date of birth	Height	Club	Ctr.
G	4	Jermaine Anderson	30 – February 8, 1983	6 ft 2 in (1.88 m)	TBB Trier	(Germany)
G	5	Cory Joseph	21 – September 20, 1991	6 ft 3 in (1.91 m)	San Antonio Spurs	(United States)
G	6	Devoe Joseph	24 – June 21, 1989	6 ft 4 in (1.93 m)	BC Khimik	(Ukraine)
F	7	Andrew Nicholson	23 – December 8, 1989	6 ft 9 in (2.06 m)	Orlando Magic	(United States)
G	8	Junior Cadougan	23 – May 7, 1990	6 ft 1 in (1.85 m)	Marquette Golden Eagles	(United States)
F	9	Jevohn Shepherd	27 – April 8, 1986	6 ft 5 in (1.96 m)	Paffoni Omegna	(Italy)
G	10	Andy Rautins	26 – November 2, 1986	6 ft 5 in (1.96 m)	Tulsa 66ers	(United States)
F	11	Aaron Doornekamp	27 – December 5, 1985	6 ft 6 in (1.98 m)	Phantoms Braunschweig	(Germany)
G	12	Brady Heslip	23 – June 19, 1990	6 ft 2 in (1.88 m)	Baylor Bears	(United States)
F	13	Tristan Thompson	22 – March 13, 1991	6 ft 9 in (2.06 m)	Cleveland Cavaliers	(United States)
F/C	14	Levon Kendall	29 – July 4, 1984	6 ft 10 in (2.08 m)	Obradoiro CAB	(Spain)
C	15	Joel Anthony	31 – August 9, 1982	6 ft 9 in (2.06 m)	Miami Heat	(United States)

Head coach

- (Canada) Jay Triano

Assistant coach(es)

- (Canada) Greg Francis
- (United States) Kelvin Sampson
- (Canada) David Smart

Legend

- Club – describes last
  club before the tournament
- Age – describes age
  on 30 August 2013

=== Jamaica ===
Jamaica men's national basketball team roster
Players
Coaches

Pos.	No.	Name	Age – Date of birth	Height	Club	Ctr.
G	4	Dylan Ennis	21 – December 26, 1991	6 ft 2 in (1.88 m)	Villanova Wildcats	(United States)
F/C	5	Adrian Uter	28 – October 27, 1984	6 ft 7 in (2.01 m)	Pallacanestro Cantù	(Italy)
F	6	Patrick Ewing Jr.	29 – May 20, 1984	6 ft 8 in (2.03 m)	CB Valladolid	(Spain)
G/F	7	Garfield Blair	26 – March 24, 1987	6 ft 5 in (1.96 m)	Heartland Eagles	(United States)
G	8	Weyinmi Efejuku	26 – September 15, 1986	6 ft 5 in (1.96 m)	Indios de Mayagüez	(Puerto Rico)
G	9	Akeem Scott	29 – September 3, 1983	6 ft 1 in (1.85 m)	Guaiqueríes	(Venezuela)
G	10	Durand Scott	23 – February 22, 1990	6 ft 5 in (1.96 m)	Obradoiro CAB	(Spain)
C	11	Jerome Jordan	26 – September 29, 1986	7 ft 1 in (2.16 m)	Talk 'N Text Tropang Texters	(Philippines)
F	12	Christopher Walker	31 – October 3, 1981	6 ft 10 in (2.08 m)	Florida Gators	(United States)
F	13	Adrian Forbes	25 – May 25, 1988	6 ft 8 in (2.03 m)	Auburn Tigers	(United States)
F/C	14	Samardo Samuels	24 – January 9, 1989	6 ft 9 in (2.06 m)	Olimpia Milano	(Italy)
C	15	Vashil Fernandez	21 – January 15, 1992	6 ft 11 in (2.11 m)	Pallacanestro Cantù	(Italy)

Head coach

- (United States) Sam Vincent

Legend

- Club – describes last
  club before the tournament
- Age – describes age
  on 30 August 2013

=== Puerto Rico ===
Puerto Rico men's national basketball team roster
Players
Coaches

Pos.	No.	Name	Age – Date of birth	Height	Club	Ctr.
C	4	Ramon Clemente	27 – 11 December 1985	2.00 m (6 ft 7 in)	Indios de Mayagüez	(Puerto Rico)
G	5	José Juan Barea	29 – 26 June 1984	1.80 m (5 ft 11 in)	Minnesota Timberwolves	(United States)
F	6	John Holland	24 – 6 November 1988	1.98 m (6 ft 6 in)	CB Sevilla	(Spain)
G	7	Carlos Arroyo	34 – 30 July 1979	1.85 m (6 ft 1 in)	Galatasaray S.K.	(Turkey)
G	8	Andrés Rodríguez	32 – 27 February 1981	1.84 m (6 ft 0 in)	Capitanes de Arecibo	(Puerto Rico)
G	9	Richard Chaney	29 – 23 January 1984	1.96 m (6 ft 5 in)	Oberwart Gunners	(Austria)
G	10	Elías Larry Ayuso	36 – 27 March 1977	1.92 m (6 ft 4 in)	Mets de Guaynabo	(Puerto Rico)
F	11	Ricky Sánchez	26 – 6 July 1987	2.13 m (7 ft 0 in)	Cangrejeros de Santurce	(Puerto Rico)
C	12	Luis Villafañe	32 – 21 June 1981	2.08 m (6 ft 10 in)	Cangrejeros de Santurce	(Puerto Rico)
F	13	Renaldo Balkman	29 – 14 July 1984	2.00 m (6 ft 7 in)	Guayama Wizards	(Puerto Rico)
F	14	Alex Galindo	28 – 26 May 1985	2.00 m (6 ft 7 in)	Cangrejeros de Santurce	(Puerto Rico)
C	15	Daniel Santiago	37 – 24 June 1976	2.16 m (7 ft 1 in)	Mets de Guaynabo	(Puerto Rico)

Head coach

- (Spain) Paco Olmos

Assistant coach

- (United States) Carlos Morales

Legend

- Club – describes last
  club before the tournament
- Age – describes age
  on 30 August 2013

=== Uruguay ===
Uruguay men's national basketball team roster
Players
Coaches

Pos.	No.	Name	Age – Date of birth	Height	Club	Ctr.
G	4	Marcos Cabot	24 – 5 July 1989	1.78 m (5 ft 10 in)	Defensor Sporting	(Uruguay)
G	5	Bruno Fitipaldo	22 – 2 August 1991	1.83 m (6 ft 0 in)	Club Malvín	(Uruguay)
F	6	Emilio Taboada	31 – 11 May 1982	1.91 m (6 ft 3 in)	Universo/Goiânia	(Brazil)
C	7	Mathías Calfani	21 – 21 January 1992	2.02 m (6 ft 8 in)	Club Malvín	(Uruguay)
G	8	Nicolás Mazzarino	38 – 21 August 1975	1.81 m (5 ft 11 in)	Club Malvín	(Uruguay)
F	9	Sebastián Vázquez	27 – 4 September 1985	1.95 m (6 ft 5 in)	Defensor Sporting	(Uruguay)
G	10	Leandro García Morales	33 – 27 June 1980	1.86 m (6 ft 1 in)	Club Aguada	(Uruguay)
C	11	Reque Newsome	31 – 8 October 1981	2.01 m (6 ft 7 in)	Bambuqueros	(Colombia)
G	12	Federico Bavosi	32 – 1 March 1981	1.85 m (6 ft 1 in)	Unión Atlética	(Uruguay)
F/C	13	Kiril Wachsmann	28 – 11 November 1984	2.03 m (6 ft 8 in)	Melilla Baloncesto	(Spain)
C	14	Sebastián Izaguirre	27 – 4 December 1985	2.07 m (6 ft 9 in)	Defensor Sporting	(Uruguay)
F/C	15	Esteban Batista	29 – 2 September 1983	2.08 m (6 ft 10 in)	Karşıyaka S.K.	(Turkey)

Head coach

- (Uruguay) Pablo López

Assistant coach(es)

- (Uruguay) Alejandro Glik
- (Uruguay) Matteo Rubio

Legend

- Club – describes last
  club before the tournament
- Age – describes age
  on 30 August 2013

== Group B ==
=== Argentina ===
The roster was announced on 21 August.

Argentina men's national basketball team roster
Players
Coaches

Pos.	No.	Name	Age – Date of birth	Height	Club	Ctr.
F/C	4	Luis Scola	33 – 30 April 1980	2.06 m (6 ft 9 in)	Indiana Pacers	(United States)
G	5	Juan Fernández	23 – 22 July 1990	1.94 m (6 ft 4 in)	Dinamo Basket Sassari	(Italy)
F	6	Marcos Mata	26 – 1 August 1986	2.01 m (6 ft 7 in)	CB Sevilla	(Spain)
G	7	Facundo Campazzo	22 – 23 March 1991	1.79 m (5 ft 10 in)	Peñarol (MdP)	(Argentina)
G	8	Nicolás Laprovíttola	23 – 31 January 1990	1.85 m (6 ft 1 in)	Flamengo Basketball	(Brazil)
C	9	Juan Pedro Gutiérrez	29 – 10 October 1983	2.06 m (6 ft 9 in)	CB 1939 Canarias	(Spain)
G	10	Adrián Boccia	31 – 4 July 1982	1.94 m (6 ft 4 in)	Peñarol (MdP)	(Argentina)
F	11	Pablo Espinoza	26 – 21 March 1987	2.00 m (6 ft 7 in)	Macaé Basquete	(Brazil)
F/C	12	Marcos Delía	21 – 8 April 1992	2.06 m (6 ft 9 in)	Boca Juniors	(Argentina)
C	13	Matías Bortolín	20 – 11 April 1993	2.06 m (6 ft 9 in)	Arkadia Lions	(Austria)
F	14	Leo Mainoldi	28 – 4 March 1985	2.02 m (6 ft 8 in)	Saski Baskonia	(Spain)
G	15	Selem Safar	26 – 6 May 1987	1.90 m (6 ft 3 in)	Boca Juniors	(Argentina)

Head coach

- (Argentina) Julio Lamas

Assistant coach(es)

- (Argentina) Nicolas Casalánguida
- (Argentina) Gonzalo García

Legend

- Club – describes last
  club before the tournament
- Age – describes age
  on 30 August 2013

=== Dominican Republic ===
Dominican Republic men's national basketball team roster
Players
Coaches

Pos.	No.	Name	Age – Date of birth	Height	Club	Ctr.
G	4	Édgar Sosa	25 – 15 January 1988	1.85 m (6 ft 1 in)	CB Valladolid	(Spain)
G	5	Manuel Fortuna	28 – 23 March 1985	1.86 m (6 ft 1 in)	Leones de Ponce (basketball)	(Puerto Rico)
G	6	Juan Coronado	30 – 25 August 1983	1.85 m (6 ft 1 in)	Guayama Wizards	(Puerto Rico)
F	7	Ricardo Greer	36 – 18 August 1977	1.97 m (6 ft 6 in)	Strasbourg IG	(France)
F	8	Edward Santana	25 – 14 September 1987	2.03 m (6 ft 8 in)	Gaiteros del Zulia	(Venezuela)
F	9	Francisco García	31 – 31 December 1981	2.01 m (6 ft 7 in)	Houston Rockets	(United States)
G	10	James Feldeine	25 – 26 June 1988	1.93 m (6 ft 4 in)	Baloncesto Fuenlabrada	(Spain)
F	11	Eloy Vargas	24 – 30 December 1988	2.11 m (6 ft 11 in)	Caneros de La Romana	(Dominican Republic)
F	12	Karl-Anthony Towns	17 – 15 November 1995	2.11 m (6 ft 11 in)	St. Joseph HS	(United States)
F	13	Eulis Báez	31 – 18 March 1982	1.96 m (6 ft 5 in)	CB Gran Canaria	(Spain)
G	14	Ronald Ramón	27 – 14 January 1986	1.82 m (6 ft 0 in)	Winner Limeira	(Brazil)
F	15	Jack Michael Martínez	31 – 12 October 1981	2.01 m (6 ft 7 in)	Capitanes de Arecibo	(Puerto Rico)

Head coach

- (Dominican Republic) Orlando Antigua

Assistant coach(es)

- (Dominican Republic) José Mercedes
- (Dominican Republic) Ron Sanchez
- (United States) Rod Strickland

Legend

- Club – describes last
  club before the tournament
- Age – describes age
  on 30 August 2013

=== Mexico ===
Mexico men's national basketball team roster
Players
Coaches

Pos.	No.	Name	Age – Date of birth	Height	Club	Ctr.
G	4	Paul Stoll	27 – 14 December 1985	1.78 m (5 ft 10 in)	Maccabi Haifa B.C.	(Israel)
F	5	Jovan Harris	32 – 20 February 1981	1.92 m (6 ft 4 in)	Pioneros de Quintana Roo	(Mexico)
F	6	Román Martínez	25 – 5 March 1988	2.01 m (6 ft 7 in)	Soles de Mexicali	(Mexico)
G/F	7	Jorge Gutiérrez	24 – 27 December 1988	1.90 m (6 ft 3 in)	Canton Charge	(United States)
C	8	Gustavo Ayón	28 – 1 April 1985	2.06 m (6 ft 9 in)	Atlanta Hawks	(United States)
F	9	Jesús González	27 – 14 July 1986	1.95 m (6 ft 5 in)	Huracanes de Tampico	(Mexico)
F	10	Noé Alonzo	29 – 28 December 1983	2.00 m (6 ft 7 in)	Halcones Rojos	(Mexico)
G	11	Pedro Meza	27 – 15 October 1985	1.82 m (6 ft 0 in)	Halcones UV Xalapa	(Mexico)
C	12	Héctor Hernández	28 – 15 June 1985	2.05 m (6 ft 9 in)	Pioneros de Quintana Roo	(Mexico)
G	13	Orlando Méndez-Valdez	27 – 29 April 1986	1.82 m (6 ft 0 in)	Halcones UV Xalapa	(Mexico)
C	14	Lorenzo Mata	27 – 2 March 1986	2.03 m (6 ft 8 in)	Piratas de Quebradillas	(Puerto Rico)
C	15	Fernando Benitez	24 – 6 August 1989	2.04 m (6 ft 8 in)	Halcones Rojos	(Mexico)

Head coach

- (Spain) Sergio Valdeolmillos

Assistant coach

- (Spain) Ramón Díaz Sánchez

Legend

- Club – describes last
  club before the tournament
- Age – describes age
  on 30 August 2013

=== Paraguay ===
Paraguay men's national basketball team roster
Players
Coaches

Pos.	No.	Name	Age – Date of birth	Height	Club	Ctr.
G	4	Luis Ljubetic	26 – 27 June 1987	1.81 m (5 ft 11 in)	Club Sol de América	(Paraguay)
F	5	Diego Bareiro	15 – 7 September 1997	1.95 m (6 ft 5 in)	Libertad de Sunchales	(Argentina)
G	6	Carlos Vallejos	21 – 30 January 1992	1.83 m (6 ft 0 in)	Libertad de Sunchales	(Argentina)
F/C	7	Fernando Dose	19 – 16 July 1994	2.01 m (6 ft 7 in)	Club La Unión	(Argentina)
G/F	8	Ramón Sánchez	21 – 1 October 1991	1.90 m (6 ft 3 in)	Cerro Porteño	(Paraguay)
G	9	Federico Mellone	28 – 20 January 1985	1.86 m (6 ft 1 in)	Cerro Porteño	(Paraguay)
F	10	Alejandro Peralta	24 – 15 October 1988	1.95 m (6 ft 5 in)	Club Sol de América	(Paraguay)
C	11	Guillermo Araújo	30 – 20 September 1982	2.05 m (6 ft 9 in)	Club Libertad	(Paraguay)
F	12	José Fabio	35 – 31 December 1977	2.00 m (6 ft 7 in)	Obera TC	(Argentina)
F/C	13	Edison Ortíz	31 – 25 March 1982	1.97 m (6 ft 6 in)	Libertad de Sunchales	(Argentina)
F/C	14	Mario González	24 – 14 February 1989	2.04 m (6 ft 8 in)	Club Felix Pérez Cardozo	(Paraguay)
F	15	Adolfo López	24 – 7 May 1989	1.99 m (6 ft 6 in)	Club Sol de América	(Paraguay)

Head coach

- (Argentina) Ariel Rearte

Assistant coach

- (Paraguay) Christian Viveros

Legend

- Club – describes last
  club before the tournament
- Age – describes age
  on 30 August 2013

=== Venezuela ===
Venezuela men's national basketball team roster
Players
Coaches

Pos.	No.	Name	Age – Date of birth	Height	Club	Ctr.
C	4	Miguel Marriaga	29 – 6 June 1984	2.06 m (6 ft 9 in)	Marinos de Anzoategui	(Venezuela)
G	5	Gregory Vargas	27 – 18 February 1986	1.80 m (5 ft 11 in)	Marinos de Anzoátegui	(Venezuela)
G	6	Heissler Guillent	26 – 17 December 1986	1.86 m (6 ft 1 in)	Guaros de Lara	(Venezuela)
F	7	Donta Smith	29 – 27 November 1983	2.01 m (6 ft 7 in)	Maccabi Haifa B.C.	(Israel)
G	8	David Cubillan	26 – 27 July 1987	1.81 m (5 ft 11 in)	Maccabi Haifa B.C.	(Israel)
F	9	Néstor Colmenares	25 – 5 September 1987	2.03 m (6 ft 8 in)	Cocodrilos de Caracas	(Venezuela)
G/F	10	José Vargas	31 – 23 January 1982	1.95 m (6 ft 5 in)	Marinos de Anzoátegui	(Venezuela)
F/C	11	Luis Bethelmy	26 – 14 October 1986	2.00 m (6 ft 7 in)	Cocodrilos de Caracas	(Venezuela)
F/C	12	Héctor Romero	33 – 3 January 1980	2.02 m (6 ft 8 in)	Trotamundos de Carabobo	(Venezuela)
F	13	Axiers Sucre	35 – 27 July 1978	1.99 m (6 ft 6 in)	Marinos de Anzoátegui	(Venezuela)
G/F	14	Rafael Pérez	31 – 10 April 1982	1.93 m (6 ft 4 in)	Guaiqueríes de Margarita	(Venezuela)
C	15	Windi Graterol	26 – 10 September 1986	2.04 m (6 ft 8 in)	Cocodrilos de Caracas	(Venezuela)

Head coach

- (Argentina) Néstor García

Assistant coach

- (Venezuela) Nelson Solórzano

Legend

- Club – describes last
  club before the tournament
- Age – describes age
  on 30 August 2013
