= 1989 Tournament of the Americas squads =

This article displays the rosters for the participating teams at the 1989 Tournament of the Americas played in Mexico City, Mexico from June 8 to June 18, 1989.

== Group A ==
=== Cuba ===
- 4 Ángel Caballero
- 5 Augusto Duquesne
- 6 Lazaro Borrell
- 7 Noángel Luaces
- 8 Eduardo Cabrera
- 9 Raúl Dubois
- 10 Leonardo Pérez
- 11 Adalberto Rodríguez
- 12 Luciano Rivero
- 13 Daniel Scott
- 14 Roberto Simón
- 15 Andrés Guibert

- Head coach: (Cuba) Carmelo Ortega

=== Dominican Republic ===
- 4 Felipe Payano
- 5 Víctor Hansen
- 6 Evaristo Pérez Carrión
- 7 José Mercedes
- 8 José Vargas
- 9 José Domínguez
- 10 Máximo Tapia
- 11 Vinicio Muñoz
- 12 Hugo Cabrera
- 13 José Molina
- 14 Héctor Gil
- 15 Pedro Leandro Rodríguez

- Head coach: (Dominican Republic) Leandro de la Cruz

=== Mexico ===
- 4 Antonio Reyes
- 5 Juan Espinoza
- 6 Julio Gallardo
- 7 Roberto González
- 8 Enrique González
- 9 Rafael Willis
- 10 Luis López
- 11 Enrique Ortega
- 12 Arturo Sánchez
- 13 José Luis Arroyos
- 14 Rafael Holguín
- 15 Norberto Mena

- Head coach: (Mexico) Gustavo Saggiante

=== Panama ===
- 4 Tito Malcolm
- 5 Enrique Grenald
- 6 Gilberto Watson
- 7 Reinaldo Cousin
- 8 Anthony Fiss
- 9 Javier Clifford
- 10 Mario Gálvez
- 11 Iván Jaén
- 12 Edgar Macías
- 13 Fernando Pinillo
- 14 Leroy Jackson
- 15 Amado Martínez

- Head coach: (Panama) Reginaldo Grenald

=== Puerto Rico ===
- 4 Rafael Hernández
- 5 Federico López
- 6 Raymond Gause
- 7 Félix Rivera
- 8 Jerome Mincy
- 9 James Carter
- 10 Pablo Alicea
- 11 Edwin Pellot
- 12 Mario Morales
- 13 Orlando Marrero
- 14 Francisco de León
- 15 Ramón Ramos

- Head coach: (Puerto Rico) Raymond Dalmau

=== United States ===
- 4 Elliot Perry
- 5 Rodney Monroe
- 6 Jason Matthews
- 7 Gary Payton
- 8 Chris Corchiani
- 9 Greg Dennis
- 10 Lionel Simmons
- 11 Antonio Davis
- 12 Matt Bullard
- 13 Billy Owens
- 14 Christian Laettner
- 15 Doug Smith

- Head coach: (United States) Bobby Cremins

== Group B ==
=== Argentina ===
- 4 Andrés Santamaría
- 5 Marcelo Richotti
- 6 Diego Maggi
- 7 Carlos Cerutti
- 8 Julio Rodríguez
- 9 Marcelo Milanesio
- 10 Luis González
- 11 Miguel Cortijo
- 12 Sebastián Uranga
- 13 Carlos Romano
- 14 Diego Osella
- 15 Rubén Scolari

- Head coach: (Argentina) Alberto Finguer

=== Brazil ===
- 4 Paulão Berger
- 5 Maury
- 6 Gerson
- 7 Pipoka
- 8 Evandro
- 9 Cadum
- 10 Guerrinha
- 11 Marcel
- 12 Luiz Felipe
- 13 Paulão Silva
- 14 Oscar
- 15 Israel

- Head coach: (Brazil) Hélio Rubens Garcia

=== Canada ===
- 4 Rob Samuels
- 5 David Turcotte
- 6 Eli Pasquale
- 7 Spencer McKay
- 8 Alan Kristmanson
- 9 Tony Simms
- 10 Stewart Granger
- 11 Leo Rautins
- 12 Phil Ohl
- 13 Cord Clemens
- 14 John Karpis
- 15 Gerald Kazanowski

- Head coach: (Canada) Ken Shields

=== Ecuador ===
- 4 Eduardo Chong-Qui
- 5 Tomás Caicedo
- 6 José Saltos
- 7 Demetrio Vernaza
- 8 Roland Ponce
- 9 Armando Rubio
- 10 Enguels Tenorio
- 11 Carlos Carrera
- 12 Ayub Sánchez
- 13 Jeff Escalante
- 14 Hugo Angulo
- 15 José Obando

- Head coach: (Ecuador) Gonzalo Troya

=== Paraguay ===
- 4 Hugo González
- 5 Víctor Ljubetic
- 6 Ángel Vega
- 7 Gerardo Koppman
- 8 Luis Ocampos
- 9 Luis Dose
- 10 Santiago Ochipinti
- 11 Estéban Cabrera
- 12 Luis Schmeda
- 13 Jorge Cristaldo
- 14 Santiago Maciel
- 15 Arnoldo Penskofer

- Head coach: (Paraguay) Carlos María Ljubetic

=== Venezuela ===
- 4 David Díaz
- 5 César Portillo
- 6 Felice Parisi
- 7 Armando Becker
- 8 Rostyn González
- 9 José Echenique
- 10 Sam Shepherd
- 11 Carl Herrera
- 12 Luis Sosa
- 13 Gabriel Estaba
- 14 Iván Olivares
- 15 Armando Palacios

- Head coach: (Venezuela) Jesús Cordovez

== Bibliography ==
- Mexico 2015 FIBA Americas Championship Guía Histórica 1980–2015 (in Spanish). FIBA. 2015. pp. 35–43.
