= 2001 Tournament of the Americas squads =

This article displays the rosters for the participating teams at the 2001 Tournament of the Americas played in Neuquén, Argentina from August 16 to August 26, 2001.

== Group A ==
=== Canada ===
- 4 David Daniels
- 5 Sherman Hamilton
- 6 Dean Walker
- 7 Steve Nash
- 8 Shawn Swords
- 9 Prosper Karangwa
- 10 Jerome Robinson
- 11 Todd MacCulloch
- 12 Andrew Kwiatkowski
- 13 Peter Guarasci
- 14 Michael Meeks
- 15 Kevin Jobity

- Head coach: (Canada) Jay Triano

=== Mexico ===
- 4 Omar López
- 5 Adam Parada
- 6 Florentino Chávez
- 7 David Crouse
- 8 Enrique González
- 9 Ramsés Benítez
- 10 Víctor Mariscal
- 11 Omar Quintero
- 12 Alonso Izaguirre
- 13 Luis Cuenca
- 14 Víctor Thomas
- 15 Edwin Sánchez

- Head coach: (Mexico) Jorge Ramírez

=== Panama ===
- 4 Danubio Bennett
- 5 Jair Peralta
- 6 Abdiel Mendieta
- 7 Maximiliano Gómez
- 8 Ricardo Yearwood
- 9 Alfonso Stoute
- 10 Leroy Jackson
- 11 Michael Hicks
- 12 Eric Cárdenas
- 13 Antonio García Murillo
- 14 Iván Jaén
- 15 Gonzalo Ortiz

- Head coach: (Panama) Reggie Grenald

=== Puerto Rico ===
- 4 José Ortiz
- 5 Orlando Santiago
- 6 Carmelo Travieso
- 7 Carlos Arroyo
- 8 Jerome Mincy
- 9 Christian Dalmau
- 10 Elías Ayuso
- 11 Joe Murray
- 12 Rolando Hourruitiner
- 13 Sharif Fajardo
- 14 Richie Dalmau
- 15 Daniel Santiago

- Head coach: (Puerto Rico) Julio Toro

=== Virgin Islands ===
- Gracen Averil
- Raja Bell
- Leroy Blyden
- Andy Chelcher
- Jason Edwin
- Jameel Heywood
- Marcus Oliver
- Ja Ja Richards
- Oliver Taylor
- Carl Thomas
- Leon Trimmingham
- Calvert White

- Head coach: (United States) Tevester Anderson

== Group B ==
=== Argentina ===
- 4 Juan Ignacio Sánchez
- 5 Gabriel Fernández
- 6 Manu Ginóbili
- 7 Fabricio Oberto
- 8 Lucas Victoriano
- 9 Daniel Farabello
- 10 Hugo Sconochini
- 11 Luis Scola
- 12 Leonardo Gutiérrez
- 13 Andrés Nocioni
- 14 Leandro Palladino
- 15 Rubén Wolkowyski

- Head coach: (Argentina) Rubén Magnano

=== Brazil ===
- 4 Marcelinho Machado
- 5 Alex
- 6 Vanderlei
- 7 Tiagão
- 8 Sandro Varejão
- 9 Demétrius
- 10 Helinho
- 11 Estevam
- 12 Guilherme Giovannoni
- 13 Nenê
- 14 Anderson Varejão
- 15 Márcio Dornelles

- Head coach: (Brazil) Hélio Rubens Garcia

=== United States ===
- 4 Antonio Rambo
- 5 Marcus Banks
- 6 Blandon Ferguson
- 7 Reggie Griffin
- 8 Delonte Holland
- 9 Kendall Dartez
- 10 Seth Scott
- 11 Jerry Holman
- 12 Kenny Brown
- 13 J. K. Edwards

- Head coach: (United States) Dan Sparks
- Assistant coaches: Wayne Baker, Jay Harrington, Bob Tipson

=== Uruguay ===
- 4 Juliano Rivera
- 5 Freddy Navarrete
- 6 Diego Losada
- 7 Diego Castrillón
- 8 Nicolás Mazzarino
- 9 Luis Arrosa
- 10 Marcelo Capalbo
- 11 Rodrigo Riera
- 12 Gustavo Szczygielski
- 13 Luis Silveira
- 14 Marcel Bouzout
- 15 Juan Manuel Moltedo

- Head coach: (Uruguay) César Somma

=== Venezuela ===
- 4 Víctor David Díaz
- 5 Pablo Machado
- 6 Ernesto Mijares
- 7 Richard Lugo
- 8 Carlos Morris
- 9 Óscar Torres
- 10 Diego Guevara
- 11 Carl Herrera
- 12 Harold Keeling
- 13 Alexander Nelcha
- 14 Armando Becker
- 15 Omar Walcott

- Head coach: (United States) Jim Calvin

== Bibliography ==
- Mexico 2015 FIBA Americas Championship Guía Histórica 1980–2015 (in Spanish). FIBA. 2015. p. 91–98.
