= Basketball at the 2019 Pan American Games – Men's team rosters =

This article shows the rosters of all participating teams at the men's basketball tournament at the 2019 Pan American Games in Lima.

== Argentina ==
Argentina men's basketball team roster
Players
Coaches

Pos.	No.	Name	Age – Date of birth	Height	Club	Ctr.
G/F	9	Nicolás Brussino	26 – 2 March 1993	2.03 m (6 ft 8 in)	Basket Zaragoza	(Spain)
C	1	Agustín Caffaro	24 – 6 February 1995	2.10 m (6 ft 11 in)	San Lorenzo	(Argentina)
PG	7	Facundo Campazzo	28 – 23 March 1991	1.81 m (5 ft 11 in)	Real Madrid	(Spain)
SF	14	Gabriel Deck	24 – 8 February 1995	2.00 m (6 ft 7 in)	Real Madrid	(Spain)
C	12	Marcos Delía	27 – 8 April 1992	2.10 m (6 ft 11 in)	Joventut Badalona	(Spain)
G	10	Máximo Fjellerup	21 – 27 November 1997	1.97 m (6 ft 6 in)	San Lorenzo	(Argentina)
C	86	Tayavek Gallizzi	26 – 8 February 1993	2.06 m (6 ft 9 in)	Regatas Corrientes	(Argentina)
G/F	29	Patricio Garino	26 – 17 May 1993	1.98 m (6 ft 6 in)	Baskonia	(Spain)
PG	8	Nicolás Laprovíttola	29 – 31 January 1990	1.88 m (6 ft 2 in)	Real Madrid	(Spain)
SG	25	Lucio Redivo	25 – 14 February 1994	1.83 m (6 ft 0 in)	Breogán	(Spain)
PF	4	Luis Scola (C)	39 – 30 April 1980	2.06 m (6 ft 9 in)	Shanghai Sharks	(China)
PG	3	Luca Vildoza	23 – 11 August 1995	1.91 m (6 ft 3 in)	Baskonia	(Spain)

Head coach

- (Argentina) Sergio Hernández

Assistant coach(es)

- (Argentina) Silvio Santander

Legend

- (C) Team captain
- Club – describes current club
- Age – describes age
  on 31 July 2019

== Dominican Republic ==
Dominican Republic men's basketball team roster
Players
Coaches

Pos.	No.	Name	Age – Date of birth	Height	Club	Ctr.
G	10	Adris De León	35 – 10 July 1984	1.80 m (5 ft 11 in)	San Lázaro	(Dominican Republic)
G/F	3	L. J. Figueroa	21 – 28 March 1998	2.03 m (6 ft 8 in)	St. John's University	(United States)
F	0	Brandone Francis	24 – 10 September 1994	1.90 m (6 ft 3 in)	Texas Tech University	(United States)
F/C	15	Brayan Martínez	27 – 9 October 1991	2.06 m (6 ft 9 in)	Mauricio Baez	(Dominican Republic)
F	44	Luis Montero	26 – 6 April 1993	2.01 m (6 ft 7 in)	Cocodrilos de Caracas	(Venezuela)
G	1	Dagoberto Peña	31 – 14 June 1988	2.06 m (6 ft 9 in)	Breogán	(Spain)
F	7	Sadiel Rojas	30 – 16 July 1989	1.90 m (6 ft 3 in)	UCAM Murcia	(Spain)
C	40	Luis Santos	24 – 6 December 1994	2.06 m (6 ft 9 in)	Los Prados	(Dominican Republic)
G	4	Gelvis Solano	25 – 1 June 1994	1.87 m (6 ft 2 in)	Ciclista Olímpico	(Argentina)
G/F	9	Juan Suero	26 – 11 May 1993	2.06 m (6 ft 9 in)	Mauricio Baez	(Dominican Republic)
G/F	8	Marques Townes	23 – 3 September 1995	1.89 m (6 ft 2 in)	UCAM Murcia	(Spain)
C	11	Eloy Vargas (C)	30 – 30 December 1988	2.11 m (6 ft 11 in)	Trotamundos de Carabobo	(Venezuela)

Head coach

- (Argentina) Néstor García

Assistant coach(es)

- (Dominican Republic) Melvyn López

Legend

- (C) Team captain
- Club – describes current club
- Age – describes age
  on 31 July 2019

== Mexico ==
Mexico men's basketball team roster
Players
Coaches

Pos.	No.	Name	Age – Date of birth	Height	Club	Ctr.
F/C	15	Jorge Camacho	30 – 16 April 1989	2.03 m (6 ft 8 in)	Leñadores de Durango	(Mexico)
G/F	2	José Estrada	25 – 15 February 1994	1.94 m (6 ft 4 in)	Correcaminos UAT Victoria	(Mexico)
G/F	10	Eduardo Girón	21 – 17 October 1997	1.96 m (6 ft 5 in)	Western New Mexico University	(United States)
C	25	Israel Gutiérrez (C)	26 – 15 January 1993	2.05 m (6 ft 9 in)	Aguacateros de Michoacán	(Mexico)
F	11	Jaime Jaquez Jr.	18 – 18 February 2001	2.01 m (6 ft 7 in)	UCLA	(United States)
F/C	1	Jonatan Machado	25 – 22 October 1993	2.00 m (6 ft 7 in)	Capitanes de la Ciudad de México	(Mexico)
G	17	Alejandro Reyna	22 – 17 February 1997	2.03 m (6 ft 8 in)	Ciclista Olímpico	(Argentina)
F	36	Alejandro Tostado	21 – 8 May 1998	1.89 m (6 ft 2 in)	University of Tennessee at Chattanooga	(United States)
G	13	Bryan Urrutia	21 – 28 February 1998	1.85 m (6 ft 1 in)	University of Maryland Eastern Shore	(United States)
C	14	Uriel Velis	20 – 16 September 1998	2.08 m (6 ft 10 in)	Blinn College	(United States)
G	5	Diego Willis	20 – 11 May 1999	1.90 m (6 ft 3 in)	New Jersey Institute of Technology	(United States)
F	7	José Zesati	25 – 20 June 1994	2.04 m (6 ft 8 in)	Ángeles de Puebla	(Mexico)

Head coach

- (Spain) Iván Déniz

Assistant coach(es)

- (Venezuela) Ronald Guillén

Legend

- (C) Team captain
- Club – describes current club
- Age – describes age
  on 31 July 2019

== Puerto Rico ==
Puerto Rico men's basketball team roster
Players
Coaches

Pos.	No.	Name	Age – Date of birth	Height	Club	Ctr.
C	22	Emmanuel Andújar	27 – 27 January 1992	1.98 m (6 ft 6 in)	Santeros de Aguada	(Puerto Rico)
G	43	Christopher Brady	23 – 15 September 1995	2.08 m (6 ft 10 in)	Fukushima Firebonds	(Japan)
F	24	Gilberto Clavell	19 – 10 August 1999	1.98 m (6 ft 6 in)	Santeros de Aguada	(Puerto Rico)
F/C	7	Devon Collier	28 – 20 January 1991	1.80 m (5 ft 11 in)	Capitanes de Arecibo	(Puerto Rico)
G	11	Iván Gandía	21 – 14 September 1997	1.85 m (6 ft 1 in)	University of North Florida	(United States)
C	10	Isaiah Manderson	25 – 27 July 1994	1.80 m (5 ft 11 in)	Indios de Mayagüez	(Puerto Rico)
G	00	Christian Pizarro	24 – 16 February 1995	1.85 m (6 ft 1 in)	Indios de Mayagüez	(Puerto Rico)
C	33	Dereck Reese	25 – 3 November 1993	2.03 m (6 ft 8 in)	Cariduros de Fajardo	(Puerto Rico)
C	21	Justin Reyes	24 – 16 March 1995	1.94 m (6 ft 4 in)	Indios de Mayagüez	(Puerto Rico)
C	20	Benito Santiago Jr.	30 – 22 June 1989	1.94 m (6 ft 4 in)	Vaqueros de Bayamón	(Puerto Rico)
C	23	Isaac Sosa (C)	29 – 16 February 1990	1.90 m (6 ft 3 in)	Atléticos de San Germán	(Puerto Rico)
G	1	Joseph Soto	26 – 5 January 1993	1.85 m (6 ft 1 in)	Vaqueros de Bayamón	(Puerto Rico)

Head coach

- (Puerto Rico) Eddie Casiano

Assistant coach(es)

- (Puerto Rico) Manolo Cintrón
- (Puerto Rico) Omar González
- (Puerto Rico) Rafael Torres

Legend

- (C) Team captain
- Club – describes current club
- Age – describes age
  on 31 July 2019

== United States ==
United States men's basketball team roster
Players
Coaches

Pos.	No.	Name	Age – Date of birth	Height	Club	Ctr.
G/F	5	Ty-Shon Alexander	21 – 16 July 1998	1.95 m (6 ft 5 in)	Creighton University	(United States)
G/F	6	Myles Cale	20 – 5 March 1999	2.01 m (6 ft 7 in)	Seton Hall University	(United States)
G	11	Alpha Diallo	22 – 29 June 1997	2.04 m (6 ft 8 in)	Providence College	(United States)
G/F	7	David Duke Jr.	19 – 13 October 1999	1.98 m (6 ft 6 in)	Providence College	(United States)
G	2	Collin Gillespie	20 – 25 June 1999	1.92 m (6 ft 4 in)	Villanova University	(United States)
C	15	Geoffrey Groselle (C)	26 – 12 February 1993	2.12 m (6 ft 11 in)	BC Astana	(Kazakhstan)
G/F	8	Mustapha Heron	21 – 12 December 1997	1.98 m (6 ft 6 in)	St. John's University	(United States)
G	10	Myles Powell	22 – 7 July 1997	1.89 m (6 ft 2 in)	Seton Hall University	(United States)
F	4	Andre Reeves	20 – 4 June 1999	1.98 m (6 ft 6 in)	Providence College	(United States)
F	9	Jermaine Samuels	20 – 13 November 1998	1.98 m (6 ft 6 in)	Villanova University	(United States)
C	14	Junathaen Watson	20 – 19 October 1998	1.86 m (6 ft 1 in)	Providence College	(United States)
G/F	15	Willie Mack	36 – 15 December 1982	1.91 m (6 ft 3 in)	Fayetteville State University	(United States)
F/C	12	Tyler Wideman	23 – 18 November 1995	2.03 m (6 ft 8 in)	Cedevita Junior	(Croatia)

Head coach

- (United States) Ed Cooley

Assistant coach(es)

- (United States) Kevin Willard
- (United States) Mike Martin

Legend

- (C) Team captain
- Club – describes current club
- Age – describes age
  on 31 July 2019

== Uruguay ==
Uruguay men's basketball team roster
Players
Coaches

Pos.	No.	Name	Age – Date of birth	Height	Club	Ctr.
F/C	4	Bernardo Barrera	21 – 4 October 1997	1.97 m (6 ft 6 in)	Gimnasia y Esgrima (CR)	(Argentina)
F/C	14	Nicolás Borsellino	23 – 8 May 1996	2.01 m (6 ft 7 in)	Goes	(Uruguay)
F/C	11	Hernando Cáceres	24 – 22 August 1994	2.02 m (6 ft 8 in)	Goes	(Uruguay)
F	5	Juan Ducasse	20 – 2 September 1998	2.06 m (6 ft 9 in)	Santa Clara University	(United States)
F	10	Santiago Moglia	29 – 17 November 1989	1.95 m (6 ft 5 in)	Nacional	(Uruguay)
G	21	Luciano Parodi (C)	25 – 16 February 1994	1.78 m (5 ft 10 in)	Corinthians	(Brazil)
G/F	1	Santiago Rodríguez	20 – 14 June 1999	1.94 m (6 ft 4 in)	Aguada	(Uruguay)
F	42	Martín Rojas	21 – 23 July 1998	1.93 m (6 ft 4 in)
G	13	Juan Santiso	25 – 3 May 1994	1.84 m (6 ft 0 in)	Malvín	(Uruguay)
C	12	Uriel Trocki	22 – 28 November 1996	2.01 m (6 ft 7 in)	Maccabi Ra'anana	(Israel)
G/F	9	Santiago Vescovi	17 – 14 September 2001	1.84 m (6 ft 0 in)
C	33	Kiril Wachsmann	34 – 12 November 1984	2.00 m (6 ft 7 in)	Hispano Americano	(Argentina)

Head coach

- (Uruguay) Javier Isis

Legend

- (C) Team captain
- Club – describes current club
- Age – describes age
  on 31 July 2019

== Venezuela ==
Venezuela men's basketball team roster
Players
Coaches

Pos.	No.	Name	Age – Date of birth	Height	Club	Ctr.
F/C	11	Luis Bethelmy	32 – 14 October 1986	2.00 m (6 ft 7 in)	Cocodrilos de Caracas	(Venezuela)
F	42	Michael Carrera	26 – 7 January 1993	1.94 m (6 ft 4 in)	Obras Sanitarias	(Argentina)
G/F	9	Pedro Chourio	29 – 13 March 1990	1.90 m (6 ft 3 in)	Trotamundos de Carabobo	(Venezuela)
F/C	43	Néstor Colmenares	31 – 5 September 1987	2.00 m (6 ft 7 in)	Guaros de Lara	(Venezuela)
C	15	Windi Graterol	32 – 10 September 1986	2.05 m (6 ft 9 in)	Boca Juniors	(Argentina)
G	19	Heissler Guillent	32 – 17 December 1986	1.86 m (6 ft 1 in)	Guaros de Lara	(Venezuela)
F	21	Dwight Lewis	31 – 7 October 1987	1.98 m (6 ft 6 in)	Gimnasia y Esgrima (CR)	(Argentina)
F	8	Anthony Pérez	26 – 29 July 1993	1.98 m (6 ft 6 in)	Trotamundos de Carabobo	(Venezuela)
F/C	14	Miguel Ruiz	28 – 20 December 1990	2.02 m (6 ft 8 in)	Trouville	(Uruguay)
G	5	Gregory Vargas	33 – 18 February 1986	1.83 m (6 ft 0 in)	Maccabi Haifa	(Israel)
F	10	José Gregorio Vargas (C)	37 – 23 January 1982	1.96 m (6 ft 5 in)	Guaros de Lara	(Venezuela)
G/F	7	Jhornan Zamora	30 – 30 January 1989	1.93 m (6 ft 4 in)	ALM Évreux	(France)

Head coach

- (Argentina) Fernando Duró

Assistant coach(es)

- (Argentina) Pablo Faravel

Legend

- (C) Team captain
- Club – describes current club
- Age – describes age
  on 31 July 2019

== Virgin Islands ==
U.S. Virgin Islands men's basketball team roster
Players
Coaches

Pos.	No.	Name	Age – Date of birth	Height	Club	Ctr.
F/C	15	Shakeem Alcindor	21 – 20 May 1998	1.52 m (5 ft 0 in)	University of North Texas	(United States)
F	14	Ivan Aska	29 – 26 June 1990	2.07 m (6 ft 9 in)	Seoul SK Knights	(South Korea)
G/F	9	Johnathan Gray	28 – 5 April 1991	1.98 m (6 ft 6 in)	Cornell Big Red men's basketball	(United States)
G	8	Khalid Hart (C)	24 – 13 September 1994	1.52 m (5 ft 0 in)	Étoile Charleville-Mézières	(France)
G/F	6	Walter Hodge	32 – 21 September 1986	1.55 m (5 ft 1 in)	CS Sagesse	(Lebanon)
G/F	7	Georgio Milligan	29 – 26 July 1990	1.83 m (6 ft 0 in)	Ostioneros de Guaymas	(Mexico)
G	5	Devon Peltier	32 – 31 May 1987	1.52 m (5 ft 0 in)	Juaristi ISB	(Spain)
F/C	10	Jason Perry-Murray	25 – 3 July 1994	2.04 m (6 ft 8 in)	BC Partizani Tirana	(Albania)
G/F	0	Xavier Richards	26 – 27 October 1992	1.82 m (6 ft 0 in)	Cambelen	(Dominican Republic)
F/C	12	LaRon Smith	25 – 20 December 1993	1.52 m (5 ft 0 in)	BC Yambol	(Bulgaria)

Head coach

- (Puerto Rico) William Colón

Assistant coach(es)

- (United States) Donald Bough

Legend

- (C) Team captain
- Club – describes current club
- Age – describes age
  on 31 July 2019
