= Tayavek Gallizzi =

Argentine basketball player

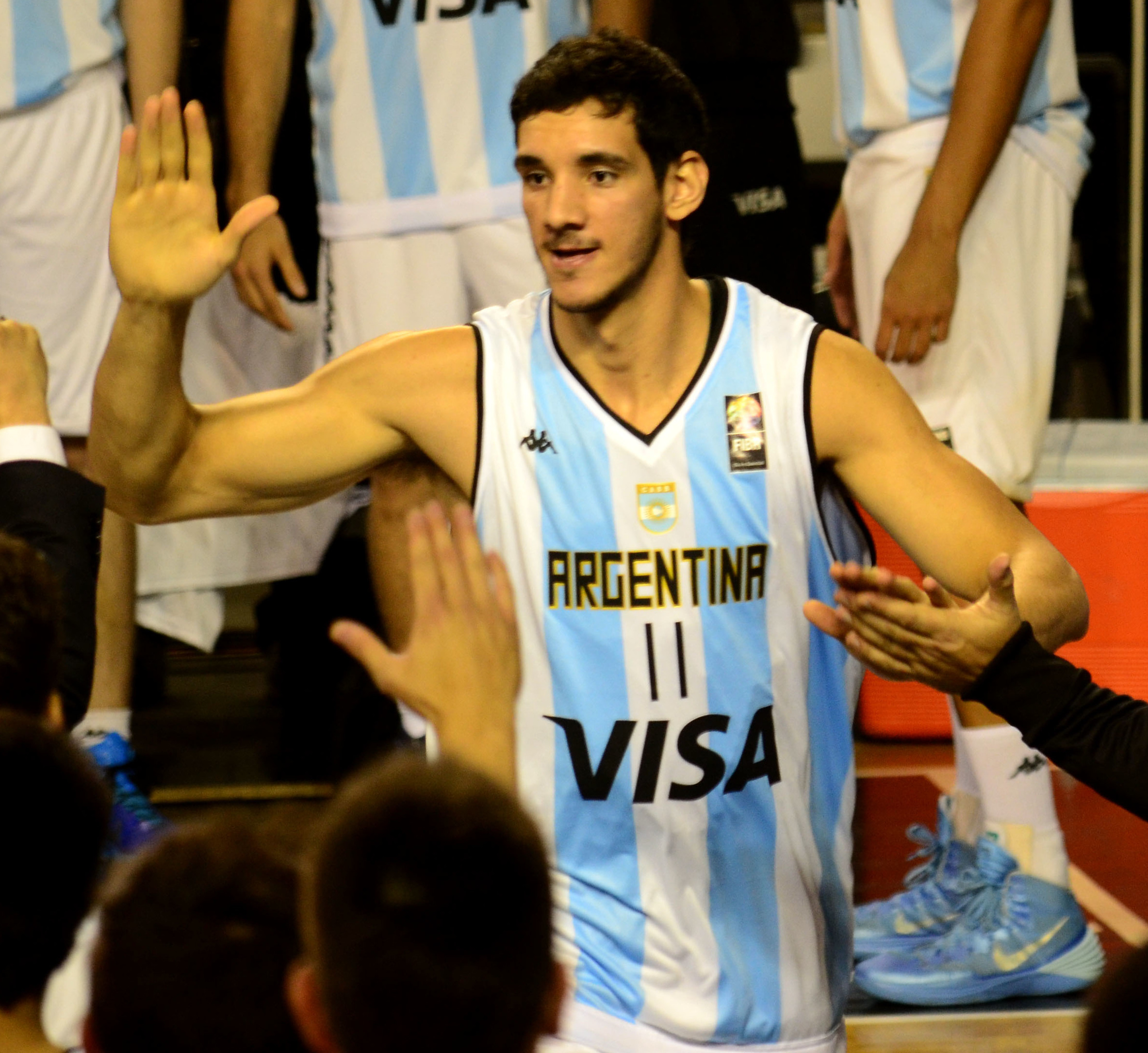
- Gallizi with Argentina, in 2015.

No. 83 – Flamengo
- Position: Power forward / center
- League: NBB

Personal information
- Born: February 8, 1993 (age 33) Santa Fe, Argentina
- Listed height: 6 ft 9 in (2.06 m)
- Listed weight: 225 lb (102 kg)

Career information
- Playing career: 2012–present

Career history
- 2012–2016: Quilmes
- 2016–2017: Quimsa
- 2017–2018: Club La Unión
- 2018–2021: Regatas Corrientes
- 2021–2024: Instituto
- 2024–present: Flamengo
Medals
Men's basketball
Representing Argentina
World Cup
Silver medal – second place	2019 China
FIBA AmeriCup
Gold medal – first place	2022 Brazil
Silver medal – second place	2015 Mexico City
Silver medal – second place	2017 Argentina
Pan American Games
Gold medal – first place	2019 Lima

Tayavek Gallizzi (born February 8, 1993) is an Argentine professional basketball player who currently plays for Flamengo of the Novo Basquete Brasil (NBB). He also represents the Argentina national team.

== Professional career ==
Gallizzi began his professional club basketball career with Quilmes Mar del Plata. He helped Quilmes earn a league promotion from the Argentine 2nd Division (TNA) to the Argentine 1st Division (LNB), in the 2012–13 season. He joined the Argentine club Quimsa in 2016 and moved to the Argentine club, Club La Unión, in 2017.

== National team career ==
Gallizzi suited up for Argentina at the 2014 FIBA World Cup. He played for Argentina at the 2015 FIBA Americas Championship bringing home a silver medal, and he also participated in the 2017 FIBA AmeriCup. He played for Argentina at the 2019 FIBA Basketball World Cup and brought home a silver medal after a loss in the tournament final against Spain at the 2019 FIBA Basketball World Cup.

In 2022, Galizzi won the gold medal in the 2022 FIBA AmeriCup held in Recife, Brazil. He was one of Argentina's centers in the tournament.
