= Jonatan Machado =

Mexican basketball player (born 1993)

No. 10 – Panteras de Aguascalientes
- Position: Power forward
- League: LNBP

Personal information
- Born: 22 October 1993 (age 33) Villahermosa, Tabasco, Mexico
- Listed height: 6 ft 7 in (2.01 m)
- Listed weight: 220 lb (100 kg)

Career information
- College: ITESM
- Playing career: 2015–present

Career history
- 2015–2016: Hapoel Kfar Saba
- 2017–2019: Mexico City Capitanes
- 2019–2020: Dorados de Chihuahua
- 2020: Astros de Jalisco
- 2021: Centauros de Chihuahua
- 2021: Astros de Jalisco
- 2022: Toros de Nuevo Laredo
- 2022–2023: Astros de Jalisco
- 2024: Toros Laguna
- 2024: Titanes de Barranquilla
- 2024: Fuerza Regia de Monterrey
- 2025: Toros Laguna
- 2025: Astros de Jalisco
- 2025–present: Panteras de Aguascalientes
- 2026: Dorados de Chihuahua

Jonatan Humberto Machado Tamez (born 22 October 1993) is a Mexican professional basketball player for the Astros de Jalisco of the CIBACOPA, and the Mexican national team.

== Career ==
Fabián made his debut in the 2017–18 season with the Mexico City Capitanes to play in the Liga Nacional de Baloncesto Profesional. He also played in the CIBACOPA for four seasons (2020, 2021, 2023 and 2025) with the Astros de Jalisco. In 2023, he signed with the Toros Laguna of the LBE. On 2024, he was confirmed as a reinforcement for Titanes de Barranquilla. In the same year he joined Fuerza Regia de Monterrey.

== National team career ==
In 2023, he was a member of the Mexican national team that participated in the 2023 Pan American Games.
