= David Díaz (basketball) =

Venezuelan basketball player (born 1964)

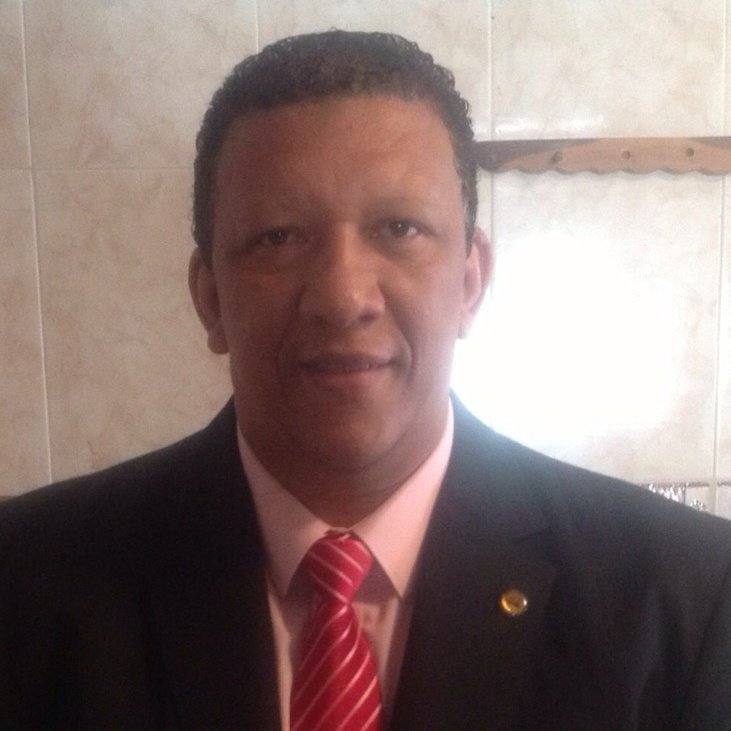

David Díaz (born 6 September 1964) is a Venezuelan former basketball player who competed in the 1992 Summer Olympics. Díaz played collegiately for Houston.
