= J. J. Avila =

American basketball player (born 1991)

No. 31 – Fuerza Regia de Monterrey
- Position: Power forward
- League: LNBP

Personal information
- Born: October 11, 1991 (age 34) McAllen, Texas, U.S.
- Listed height: 6 ft 8 in (2.03 m)
- Listed weight: 250 lb (113 kg)

Career information
- High school: McAllen (McAllen, Texas)
- College: Navy (2010–2012); Colorado State (2013–2015)
- NBA draft: 2015: undrafted
- Playing career: 2015–present

Career history
- 2015–2016: Stella Artois Leuven Bears
- 2016–2017: Windy City Bulls
- 2017–2018: Texas Legends
- 2018–2020: Agua Caliente Clippers
- 2020–2021: Fuerza Regia de Monterrey
- 2021–2022: Salt Lake City Stars
- 2022: Fuerza Regia de Monterrey
- 2022–2023: Libertadores de Querétaro
- 2023: Biguá
- 2023: Fuerza Regia de Monterrey
- 2024: Diablos Rojos del México
- 2025: Toros Laguna
- 2025: Halcones de Xalapa
- 2025: El Calor de Cancún
- 2026: Astros de Jalisco
- 2026: Dorados de Chihuahua
- 2026–present: Fuerza Regia de Monterrey

Career highlights
- LNBP championship (2020); LNBP Finals MVP (2020); LNBP All-Star (2022); First-team All-Mountain West (2015); Third-team All-Mountain West (2014); Patriot League Rookie of the Year (2011); Patriot League All-Rookie Team (2011)
- Stats at Basketball Reference

Joseph John Avila (born October 11, 1991) is an American-born Mexican professional basketball player for Fuerza Regia de Monterrey of the Liga Nacional de Baloncesto Profesional (LNBP). He played college basketball for Navy and Colorado State.

== High school career ==
Avila attended McAllen High School. As a senior, he averaged 21.6 points, 11.9 rebounds, 3.7 assists, 2.1 blocks and 1.6 steals, being named to the Class 5A Texas Association of Basketball Coaches all-state team. After graduating, Avila was the school's all-time leading scorer with 2,865 career points.

== College career ==
Avila began his career at Navy, where he played for two years and won the Patriot League Rookie of the Year after ranking second on the team in scoring (11.5), rebounding (5.3), assists (74) and free throw percentage (.829).

After playing at Navy, he transferred to South Texas College where he redshirted and then transferred to Colorado State where he averaged 16.7 points and 7.4 rebounds. He earned first-team All-Mountain West honors as a senior in 2014–15 after averaging 16.7 points, 7.5 rebounds and 2.8 assists. In his four college seasons, he saw action in started 103 of 115 games and posted averages of 15.1 points, 6.8 rebounds, 2.8 assists and 1.6 steals in 31.5 minutes.

== Professional career ==
=== Stella Artois Leuven Bears (2015–2016) ===
After going undrafted in the 2015 NBA draft, Avila joined the Houston Rockets for the 2015 NBA Summer League. On July 27, he signed with Stella Artois Leuven Bears of the Belgian League. In 18 games, he averaged 11.1 points, 5.1 rebounds and 3.2 assists.

=== Windy City Bulls (2016–2017) ===
In July, 2016, Avila joined the New York Knicks for the 2016 NBA Summer League. On September 26, 2016, he signed with the Chicago Bulls, but was waived on October 21 after appearing in two preseason games. On October 30, 2016, he was acquired by the Windy City Bulls of the NBA Development League as an affiliate player of Chicago.

=== Texas Legends (2017–2018) ===
On January 28, 2017, he was traded to the Texas Legends.

=== Agua Caliente Clippers (2018–2021) ===
On December 16, 2018, the Texas Legends announced that they had acquired Ryan Boatright from the Agua Caliente Clippers for Avila. On February 6, 2020, Avila had 21 points, nine rebounds, two assists and three steals in a loss to the Texas Legends.

=== Fuerza Regia de Monterrey (2020) ===
In October 2020, Avila joined the Fuerza Regia de Monterrey of the Mexican Liga Nacional de Baloncesto Profesional (LNBP) ahead of the playoffs. He was named Finals MVP after leading the Fuerza Regia to a 3–1 championship series win over the Aguacateros de Michoacán.

=== Salt Lake City Stars (2021–2022) ===
On December 8, 2021, Avila was acquired by the Salt Lake City Stars. He was waived on February 2, 2022.

=== Return to Fuerza Regia de Monterrey (2022) ===
Avila returned to the Fuerza Regia de Monterrey in July 2022. He earned LNBP All-Star honors.

== Personal life ==
He is the son of J.J. Avila Sr. and Vicki Avila. He majored in communication studies at Colorado State.
