= Armando Becker =

Venezuelan basketball player (born 1966)

Medal record

Men's basketball

Representing Venezuela

South American Basketball Championship
| Bronze medal – third place | 2001 Valdivia | National Team |

Armando Becker (born June 9, 1966 in Caracas) is a retired male basketball player from Venezuela, who played as a forward during his career. He competed for the Venezuela national basketball team at the 1990 FIBA World Championship and at the 1991 Pan American Games.

== Career ==
Becker played his college basketball at Central Missouri, becoming the only two-time first-team All-American selection in school history. He was also a two-time All-MIAA selection and was named conference MVP in 1990. As a senior, he posted averages of 23.3 points and 6.9 rebounds per game, leading the Mules to a 27–5 record and a runner-up finish in an NCAA Division II regional. He was inducted into the school's Athletic Hall of Fame in 2008.

He played with the Pittsburgh Piranhas of the Continental Basketball Association (CBA) in 1995 before enjoying a long career in South America.

He became a coach in the Venezuelan league after his playing career.
