= Daniel Scott (basketball) =

Cuban basketball player

Personal information
- Full name: Daniel Scott Brice
- Born: 11 January 1953 (age 72); Santa Cruz del Sur, Cuba

Sport
- Sport: Basketball

Daniel Scott (born 11 January 1953) is a Cuban basketball coach and former player. As a player, he competed in the men's tournament at the 1976 Summer Olympics and the 1980 Summer Olympics.
