= David Meza (basketball) =

Mexican basketball player

Personal information
- Born: 15 October 1985 (age 41) Culiacan, Mexico
- Listed height: 6 ft 1 in (1.85 m)
- Listed weight: 192 lb (87 kg)

Career information
- College: Arizona Western (2004–2005)
- Playing career: 2004–2021
- Position: Point guard

Career history
- 2004: Caballeros de Culiacán
- 2007–2010: Caballeros de Culiacán
- 2008–2011: Halcones Xalapa
- 2011–2012: Soles de Mexicali
- 2012: Trotamundos
- 2012–2013: Pioneros de Quintana Roo
- 2013–2015: Halcones Xalapa
- 2015–2016: Pioneros de Quintana Roo
- 2016–2017: Soles de Mexicali
- 2017–2020: Capitanes de Ciudad de México
- 2020–2021: Mineros de Zacatecas
Medals
Men's basketball
Representing Mexico
Pan American Games
Silver medal – second place	2011 Guadalajara

Pedro David Meza (born 15 October 1985) is a former Mexican basketball player, who last played for the Mineros de Zacatecas. He represented the Mexico national team internationally, when he participated at the 2014 FIBA Basketball World Cup.

In May 2021, Meza announced his retirement as a player. Two months later, he joined the Capitanes de Ciudad de México as director of institutional relations and youth teams.

== Honours ==
- Pan American Games 2011 Silver Medal
- FIBA COCABA Championship 2013 Gold Medal
- 2014 Centrobasket Gold Medal
