= Sergio Valdeolmillos =

Spanish basketball coach (born 1967)

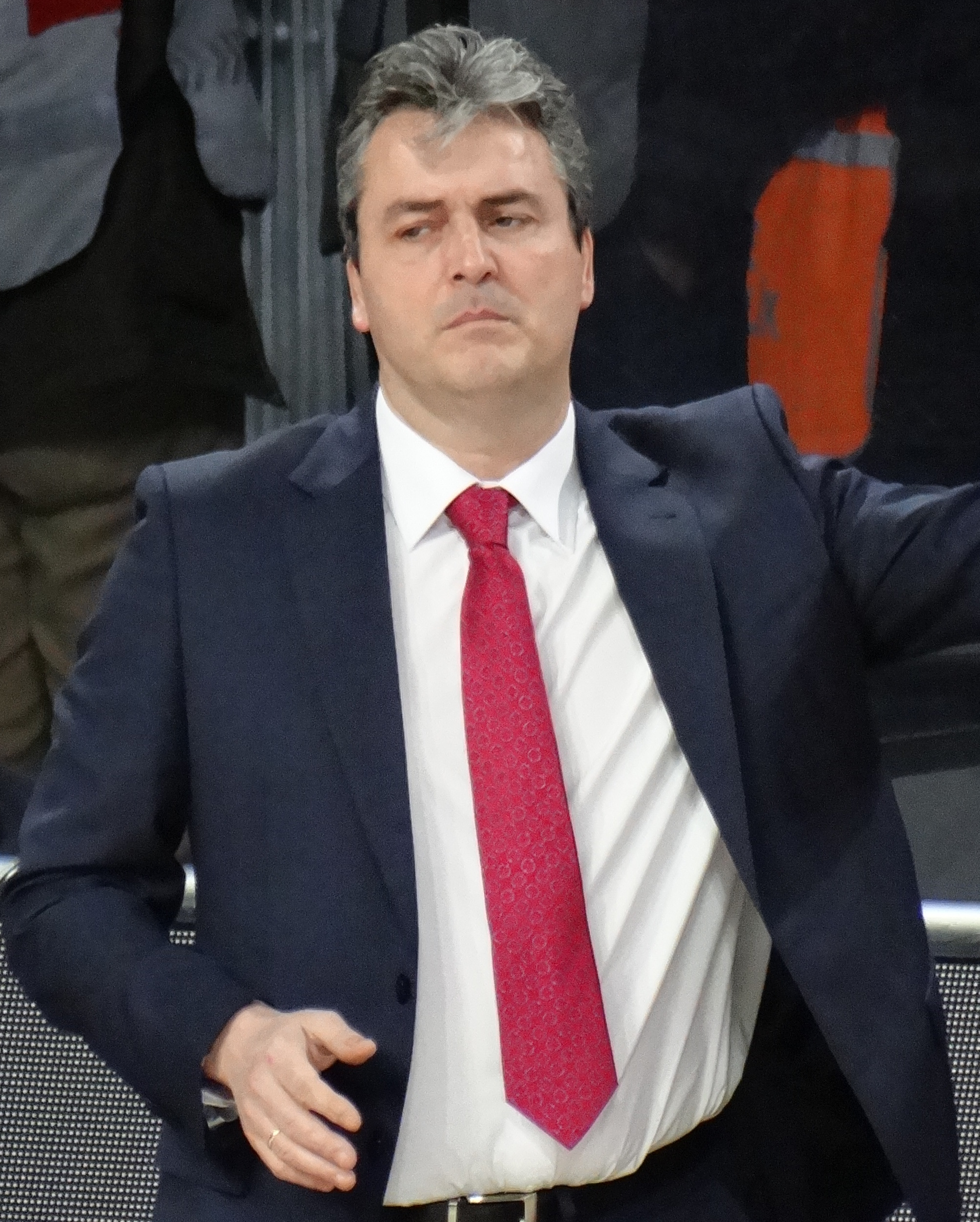
- Valdeolmillos as assistant coach of Baskonia in 2017

Petro de Luanda
- Position: Head coach
- League: Angolan Basketball League; BAL

Personal information
- Born: 4 April 1967 (age 59) Granada, Spain
- Coaching career: 1993–present

Career history

Coaching
- 1993–1996: CB Huelva 76
- 1996–1997: Ciudad de Huelva
- 1998–2001: Club Ourense Baloncesto
- 2002–2003: Ciudad de Algeciras
- 2003–2008: Granada
- 2009–2010: Breogán
- 2011–2017: Mexico
- 2013–2014: Halcones de Xalapa
- 2015–2016: Marinos de Anzoátegui
- 2016: Estudiantes
- 2017–2018: Baskonia (assistant)
- 2018–2019: GBC
- 2020–2023: Astros de Jalisco
- 2024–present: Petro de Luanda

Career highlights
- BAL champion (2024); 2× Angolan League champion (2024, 2025); Angolan Cup winner (2025); Angolan Super Cup winner (2025); LNBP Coach of the Year (2022); CIBACOPA champion (2022); LEB champion (1999)
Medals
Men's basketball
Head coach for Mexico
FIBA AmeriCup
Gold medal – first place	2013 Venezuela
Bronze medal – third place	2017 Argentina–Colombia–Uruguay

Sergio Valdeolmillos Moreno (born 4 April 1967) is a Spanish basketball coach who is the current coach of Petro de Luanda of the Angolan Basketball League and the Basketball Africa League (BAL). Valdeolmillos won the BAL championship with Petro de Luanda in 2024, and led the team to a national treble in 2025.

== National team career ==
Valdeolmillos coached the Mexico national team at the 2014 FIBA Basketball World Cup. Valdeolmillos also led Mexico to the 2013 FIBA Americas Championship and the 2014 Centrobasket Championship.

== Club career ==
Valdeolmillos began his career with CB Huelva 76, and later with CB Ciudad de Huelva. He led the team to the Liga Española de Baloncesto (LEB) championship in 1997. The title was sealed on May 20, 1997, when Huelva won the final game over Andorra, securing its first promotion to the Liga ACB.

Valdeolmillos was named the LNBP Coach of the Year in 2022 while coaching for Astros de Jalisco. He won the 2022 CIBACOPA championship with Astros.

On 28 March 2024, he signed as head coach of Angolan club Petro de Luanda of the Angolan Basketball League and the Basketball Africa League (BAL), where he replaced sacked coach José Neto. He signed a one-year contract with the option to extend for one more season. Valdeolmillos coached Petro to their first-ever BAL championship, following their win in the final against Al Ahly Ly. One month later, he led the team to the Angolan League title.

In the 2024–25 season, he led Petro de Luanda to a national treble, winning the league, cup and supercup titles.

== Trophies ==
=== Clubs ===
Petro de Luanda

- Basketball Africa League: 2025
- Angolan Basketball League: 2023–24, 2024–25
- Taça de Angola: 2025
- Supertaça de Angola: 2024

CB Ciudad de Huelva

- LEB: (1) 1997
- 1996-97 LEB. C. B. Huelva. Champion. Promotion.
- 1999-00 LEB. Club Ourense Baloncesto. Runner-up. Promotion.
- 2003-04 LEB. CB Granada. Runner-up. Promotion.
- 2005 Supercopa. CB Granada. Runner-up.

Astros de Jalisco

- CIBACOPA champion: 2022

=== Mexico National Basketball Team ===
- 2011 Pan American Games Mexico national basketball team. Silver medal.
- 2013 COCABA Championship Mexico national basketball team. Gold medal.
- 2013 FIBA Americas Championship Mexico national basketball team. Gold medal.
- 2015 FIBA Americas Championship Mexico national basketball team. Fourth place.
- 2014 Centrobasket Mexico national basketball team. Gold medal.
- 2016 Centrobasket Mexico national basketball team. Silver medal.
- 2016 FIBA World Olympic Qualifying Tournament Mexico national basketball team. Fourth place.
