= Rubén Magnano =

Argentine-Italian basketball coach

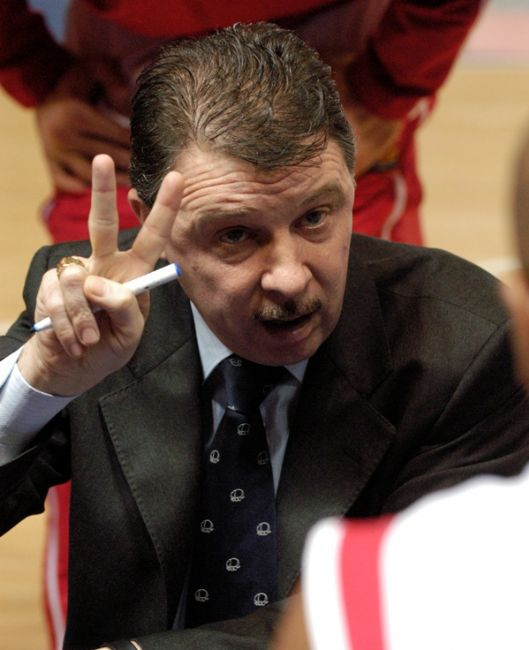
- Magnano coaching Pallacanestro Varese

Personal information
- Born: 9 October 1954 (age 72) Villa María, Argentina
- Position: Head coach
- Coaching career: 1990–present

Career history

Coaching
- 1990–1994: Atenas Córdoba
- 1994–1996: Luz y Fuerza Posadas
- 1996–1999: Atenas Córdoba
- 1999–2000: Boca Juniors
- 2000: Argentina Under-21
- 2001–2004: Argentina
- 2004: Argentina Under-21
- 2004: Gimnasia
- 2005–2007: Pallacanestro Varese
- 2007–2008: CB Sevilla
- 2008–2010: Atenas Córdoba
- 2010–2016: Brazil
- 2018–present: Uruguay

Career highlights
- As head coach: Pan American Club Championship champion (1996); 2× FIBA South American League champion (1997, 1998); 2× South American Club champion (1993, 1994); 4× Argentine League champion (1992, 1998, 1999, 2009); Argentine 2nd Division champion (1995); Argentine League Coach of the Year (2000)
- FIBA Hall of Fame
Medals
Men's basketball
Representing Argentina
Summer Olympic Games
Gold medal – first place	2004 Athens
FIBA World Cup
Silver medal – second place	2002 United States
FIBA AmeriCup
Gold medal – first place	2001 Argentina
Silver medal – second place	2003 Puerto Rico
Representing Brazil
FIBA AmeriCup
Silver medal – second place	2011 Argentina
Pan American Games
Gold medal – first place	2015 Toronto

Rubén Pablo Magnano (born 9 October 1954) is an Argentine-Italian professional basketball coach.

== Coaching career ==
Magnano served as the head coach of the senior men's Argentine national team. He led Argentina to the silver medal at the 2002 FIBA World Championship. Argentina also beat Team USA during the tournament.

He also led Argentina to a gold medal at the 2004 Summer Olympic Games. In the process, Argentina once again beat Team USA, that time in the tournament's semifinals.

In January 2010, he became the head coach of the senior men's Brazilian national team until 2016. He was granted the Platinum Konex Award 2010 as the best head coach from the last decade in Argentina. In 2018, he became the head coach of the senior men's Uruguay national team.

== Awards and accomplishments ==
=== Pro clubs ===
- 4× Argentine League Champion: (1992, 1998, 1999, 2009)
- 2× South American Club Champion: (1993, 1994)
- Argentine 2nd Division Champion: (1995)
- Pan American Club Championship Champion: (1996)
- 2× South American League Champion: (1997, 1998)
- Argentine League Coach of the Year: (2000)

=== National teams ===
- 2001 FIBA AmeriCup: Gold
- 2002 FIBA World Cup: Silver
- 2003 FIBA AmeriCup: Silver
- 2004 Summer Olympics: Gold
- 2011 FIBA AmeriCup: Silver
