= Basketball at the 2007 Pan American Games =

- Venue: Autódromo de Jacarépagua
- Dates: July 25–29, 2007
- Teams: 8

Medalists
Gold medal	United States
Silver medal	Brazil
Bronze medal	Cuba

Basketball at the 2007 Pan American Games took place at the indoor arena in the Autódromo de Jacarépagua in Rio de Janeiro, Brazil, an arena which was built specially for the Pan Am Games. Brazil was the reigning Pan American champion in the men's competition, while Cuba defended its title in the women's competition.

Each competition had eight teams divided in two groups. In each group, each team played against all others once and the two best advanced to the semifinals. The two latter in each group played in 5th to 8th classification matches. The women's competition started on July 20 with the final held on July 24. The men's competition began on July 25, with the finals on July 29.

== Men's ==
=== Qualification ===
Three teams automatically qualified to compete in this tournament, the hosts Mexico, Canada and the United States. The rest qualified through two regional tournaments.

Event	Date	Location	Vacancies	Qualified
Host Nation	–	–	1	Brazil
Automatic Qualification			2	Canada; United States
2006 Centrobasket	July 4–8, 2006	Panama City	3	Panama; Puerto Rico; Virgin Islands
2006 South American Basketball Championship	July 12–16, 2006	(Venezuela) Caracas	2	Argentina; Uruguay
TOTAL			8	

=== Group A ===
Team	Pts	Pld	W	L	PF	PA	Diff
Brazil	6	3	3	0	281	238	+43
Puerto Rico	5	3	2	1	238	217	+21
Virgin Islands	4	3	1	2	212	215	−3
Canada	3	3	0	3	193	254	−61

July 25, 2007
13:15

Puerto Rico	82–63	Canada
Scoring by quarter: 16–15, 42–30, 60–45, 82–63
Pts: Barea (21); Rebs: Reyes (8); Asts: Berdiel (3)		Pts: Rautins (13); Rebs: Brempong (6); Asts: Anderson (2)

Arena Olímpica, Rio de Janeiro
Attendance: 3.200
Referees: (Argentina) Alejandro Chiti

July 25, 2007
15:30

Brazil	86–81	Virgin Islands
Scoring by quarter: 32–21, 51–43, 67–62, 86–81
Pts: Murilo, João Paulo (17); Rebs: Murilo (11); Asts: Valtinho (8)		Pts: Elegar (21); Rebs: Elegar (7); Asts: Miller (3)

Arena Olímpica, Rio de Janeiro
Attendance: 9.500
Referees: (Venezuela) Daniel Delgado

July 26, 2007
13:15

Virgin Islands	57–62	Puerto Rico
Scoring by quarter: 14–18, 30–32, 44–51, 57–62
Pts: Victor (13); Rebs: Victor (13); Asts: Sheppard, Edwin (2)		Pts: Carmona (23); Rebs: Reyes (12); Asts: Barea, Berdiel (4)

Arena Olímpica, Rio de Janeiro
Attendance: 770
Referees: (Uruguay) Isaac Glass

July 26, 2007
15:30

Canada	63–98	Brazil
Scoring by quarter: 23–25, 37–53, 48–75, 63–98
Pts: Rautins (16); Rebs: Young, Doornekamp (3); Asts: Anderson (4)		Pts: Murilo (24); Rebs: Murilo (7); Asts: Marcelinho (5)

Arena Olímpica, Rio de Janeiro
Attendance: 8.300
Referees: (Argentina) Alejandro Chiti

July 27, 2007
12:45

Virgin Islands	74–67	Canada
Scoring by quarter: 18–16, 30–34, 56–49, 74–67
Pts: Krauser (20); Rebs: Victor, Elegar, Thomas (5); Asts: Edwin, Rhymer (2)		Pts: Anderson (17); Rebs: Doornekamp (10); Asts: Rautins (3)

Arena Olímpica, Rio de Janeiro
Referees: (Uruguay) Isaac Glass

July 27, 2007
15:00

Brazil	97–94	Puerto Rico
Scoring by quarter: 23–19, 56–41, 75–71, 97–94
Pts: Marcelinho (25); Rebs: Murilo, João Paulo, Caio (5); Asts: Marcelinho, Valtinho (5)		Pts: Barea (18); Rebs: Reyes (14); Asts: Barea (10)

Arena Olímpica, Rio de Janeiro
Referees: (Argentina) Alejandro Chiti

=== Group B ===
Team	Pts	Pld	W	L	PF	PA	Diff
Argentina	5	3	2	1	218	214	+4
Uruguay	5	3	2	1	226	211	+15
Panama	4	3	1	2	214	219	−5
United States	4	3	1	2	213	227	−14

July 25, 2007
19:45

Panama	71–76	Argentina
Scoring by quarter: 19–8, 29–25, 49–47, 71–76
Pts: Lloreda (23); Rebs: Lloreda (18); Asts: Gómez (4)		Pts: García (18); Rebs: García, Cequeira, Sucatzky, Mikulas, Leiva (4); Asts: Cequeira (5)

Arena Olímpica, Rio de Janeiro
Attendance: 870
Referees: (Brazil) Cristiano Maranhão

July 25, 2007
22:00

United States	72–81	Uruguay
Scoring by quarter: 16–17, 38–37, 58–63, 72–81
Pts: White Jr., Leunen (14); Rebs: White Jr. (9); Asts: Neitzel (5)		Pts: Batista (25); Rebs: Batista (7); Asts: Osimani (3)

Arena Olímpica, Rio de Janeiro
Attendance: 1.100
Referees: (Brazil) Sérgio Pacheco

July 26, 2007
19:45

Panama	75–67	United States
Scoring by quarter: 15–21, 33–33, 57–44, 75–67
Pts: Pinnock (23); Rebs: Gómez (9); Asts: Pinnock (5)		Pts: Hibbert (19); Rebs: Hibbert (9); Asts: Neitzel (3)

Arena Olímpica, Rio de Janeiro
Referees: (Venezuela) Daniel Delgado

July 26, 2007
22:00

Uruguay	69–71	Argentina
Scoring by quarter: 10–12, 35–27, 51–45, 69–71
Pts: García Morales (21); Rebs: Batista (16); Asts: Mazzarino, Taboada (3)		Pts: García (16); Rebs: González (9); Asts: Prato (3)

Arena Olímpica, Rio de Janeiro
Referees: (Puerto Rico) Jorge Vásquez

July 27, 2007
19:45

Uruguay	76–68	Panama
Scoring by quarter: 15–10, 30–29, 54–48, 76–68
Pts: Mazzarino (27); Rebs: Batista (11); Asts: García Morales (4)		Pts: Lloreda (18); Rebs: Lloreda (8); Asts: Pinnock (6)

Arena Olímpica, Rio de Janeiro
Referees: (Brazil) Cristiano Maranhão

July 27, 2007
22:00

Argentina	71–74	United States
Scoring by quarter: 24–22, 38–36, 57–59, 71–74
Pts: González (21); Rebs: González (7); Asts: Mikulas (5)		Pts: White Jr. (22); Rebs: Hibbert (9); Asts: Hibbert, Dorsey (3)

Arena Olímpica, Rio de Janeiro
Referees: (Brazil) Sérgio Pacheco

=== Semifinals ===
July 28, 2007
10:45

Argentina	80–89	Puerto Rico
Scoring by quarter: 12–26, 28–42, 48–63, 80–89
Pts: González (23); Rebs: González (10); Asts: García, Cequeira (2)		Pts: Barea (25); Rebs: Reyes (12); Asts: Barea (9)

Arena Olímpica, Rio de Janeiro
Referees: (Canada) John Hunt

July 28, 2007
15:00

Brazil	85–73	Uruguay
Scoring by quarter: 27–14, 41–37, 60–55, 85–73
Pts: Valtinho (22); Rebs: Murilo (8); Asts: Valtinho (8)		Pts: Mazzarino (19); Rebs: Batista (8); Asts: Mazzarino (4)

Arena Olímpica, Rio de Janeiro
Referees: (United States) Winston Stich

=== Classification 5–8 ===
July 28, 2007
8:00

Panama	68–67	Canada

Rio de Janeiro

July 28, 2007
17:15

Virgin Islands	58–84	United States

Rio de Janeiro

=== Finals ===
==== Classification 7–8 ====
July 29, 2007
15:00

Canada	69–60	Virgin Islands

Rio de Janeiro

==== Classification 5–6 ====
July 29, 2007
13:00

Panama	74–77	United States

Rio de Janeiro

==== Bronze-medal match ====
July 29, 2007
8:45

Argentina	93–99	Uruguay

Rio de Janeiro

==== Gold-medal match ====
July 29, 2007
11:00

Puerto Rico	65–86	Brazil

Rio de Janeiro

=== Final classification ===
Place	Team	Score
Gold medal	Brazil	86–65
Silver medal	Puerto Rico	
Bronze medal	Uruguay	99–93
4	Argentina	
5	United States	77–74
6	Panama	
7	Canada	69–60
8	Virgin Islands	

=== Awards ===
==== Topscorer ====
- (Uruguay) Esteban Batista 91 pts (18.2 ppg)

2007 Pan American Games winners

Brazil
Fifth title

== Women's ==
=== Group A ===
Team	Pts	Pld	W	L	PF	PA	Diff
Brazil	6	3	3	0	246	176	+70
Canada	5	3	2	1	195	186	+9
Jamaica	4	3	1	2	184	185	−1
Mexico	3	3	0	3	153	231	−78

July 20, 2007
15:30

Canada	74–63 (OT)	Mexico
Scoring by quarter: 14–16, 15–8, 15–17, 17–20, Overtime: 13–2
Pts: Gabriele – 22; Asts: Gabriele – 5		Pts: Silva – 20; Asts: Silva- 3

Rio de Janeiro
Attendance: 600
Referees: Aluz (ARG)

July 20, 2007
22:00

Brazil	81–69	Jamaica

Rio de Janeiro

July 21, 2007
15:30

Mexico	44–88	Brazil

Rio de Janeiro

July 21, 2007
22:00

Jamaica	46–58	Canada

Rio de Janeiro

July 22, 2007
15:30

Mexico	46–69	Jamaica

Rio de Janeiro

July 22, 2007
22:00

Brazil	77–63	Canada

Rio de Janeiro

=== Group B ===
Team	Pts	Pld	W	L	PF	PA	Diff
United States	6	3	3	0	258	158	+100
Cuba	5	3	2	1	225	210	+15
Colombia	4	2	1	2	162	242	−80
Argentina	3	3	0	3	199	234	−35

July 20, 2007
13:15

United States	95–41	Colombia
Scoring by quarter: 32–14, 31–9, 15–12, 17–6
Pts: Ajavon – 15; Rebs: Houston – 10; Asts: Hornbuckle – 4		Pts: Arias – 17; Rebs: Arias – 7 Asts: Arias, Pinilla – 2

Rio de Janeiro

July 20, 2007
19:45

Argentina	79–81	Cuba

Rio de Janeiro

July 21, 2007
13:15

Cuba	81–53	Colombia

Rio de Janeiro

July 21, 2007
19:45

United States	85–54	Argentina
Scoring by quarter: 25–11, 20–4, 18–19, 22–20
Pts: Fox – 18; Asts: Coleman – 3		Pts: Cava – 13; Asts: Paoletta – 4

Rio de Janeiro

July 22, 2007
13:15

Colombia	68–66	Argentina

Rio de Janeiro

July 22, 2007
19:45

Cuba	63–78	United States
Scoring by quarter: 13–17, 11–19, 23–22, 16–20
Pts: Boulet – 19; Asts: Romero – 4		Pts: Coleman – 19; Asts: Wiggins, Ajavon – 3

Rio de Janeiro
Attendance: 6500

=== Semifinals ===
July 23, 2007
15:30

Brazil	79–60	Cuba

Rio de Janeiro

July 23, 2007
19:45

United States	75–59	Canada

Rio de Janeiro

=== Classification 5–8 ===
July 23, 2007
13:15

Jamaica	61–73	Argentina

Rio de Janeiro

July 23, 2007
22:00

Colombia	62–55	Mexico

Rio de Janeiro

=== Finals ===
==== Classification 7–8 ====
July 24, 2007
21:00

Jamaica	56–63	Mexico

Rio de Janeiro

==== Classification 5–6 ====
July 24, 2007
18:45

Colombia	59–58	Argentina

Rio de Janeiro

==== Bronze-medal match ====
July 24, 2007
13:15

Cuba	62–49	Canada

Rio de Janeiro

==== Gold-medal match ====
July 24, 2007
15:30

United States	79–66	Brazil
Scoring by quarter: 18–19, 15–15, 16–19, 30–13
Pts: Ajavon – 27; Asts: Anosike – 4		Pts: Jacinto – 21; Asts: Arcain – 3

Rio de Janeiro
Attendance: 13,200

=== Final classification ===
Place	Team	Score
Gold medal	United States	79–66
Silver medal	Brazil	
Bronze medal	Cuba	62–49
4	Canada	
5	Colombia	59–58
6	Argentina	
7	Mexico	63–56
8	Jamaica	

== Rosters ==
=== Men's competition ===
Argentina

- Facundo Sucatzky
- Diego García
- Gabriel Mikulas
- Diego Logrippo
- Luis Cequeira
- Matías Sandes
- Román González
- Martin Leiva
- Patricio Prato
- Javier Bulfoni
- Leonardo Mainoldi
- Mariano Byró
- Head coach:
  Gonzalo García

Brazil

- Marcelo Machado
- Welington dos Santos
- Murilo da Rosa
- Marcus Reis
- Marcelinho Huertas
- Valter da Silva
- Alex Garcia
- Guilherme Teichmann
- Caio Torres
- J. P. Batista
- Marcus Vinicius
- Paulão Prestes
- Head coach:
  Aluisio Ferrerira

Canada

- Osvaldo Jeanty
- Jermaine Anderson
- Ryan Bell
- Paul Larmand
- Rans Brempong
- Andy Rautins
- Aaron Doornekamp
- Jesse Wade Young
- Jermaine Bucknor
- Sean Denison
- Vlad Kuljanin
- Head coach:
  Leo Rautins

Panama

- Joel Muñoz
- Jair Jamel Peralta
- Danilo Pinnock
- Maximiliano Gómez Torres
- Jamaal Levy
- Jorsua Chambers
- Reyjavick Degracia
- Eduardo Isaac
- Dionisio Gomez
- Joel Isaac Tesis
- José Lloreda
- Desmond Smith
- Head coach:
  Vincente Duncan

Puerto Rico

- Peter John Ramos
- José Juan Barea
- Ansel Guzmán
- Miguel Berdiel
- Joel Martin Jones
- Alejandro Carmona
- Gabriel Colon
- Ricardo Sanchez
- Angelo Reyes
- Héctor Velenzuela
- Carmelo Lee
- Manuel Narvaez
- Head coach:
  Manuel Cintron Vega

Uruguay

- Fernando Martínez
- Emilio Taboada
- Mauricio Aguiar
- Panchi Barrera
- Nicolás Mazzarino
- Claudio Charquero
- Leandro García
- Martín Osimani
- Gastón Paez
- Juan Pablo Silveira
- Sebastián Izaguirre
- Esteban Batista
- Head coach:
  Alberto Espasandin

United States

- Joey Dorsey
- Wayne Ellington
- Shan Foster
- James Gist
- Roy Hibbert
- Maarty Leunen
- Derrick Low
- Eric Maynor
- Drew Neitzel
- Scottie Reynolds
- Kyle Weaver
- D.J. White
- Head coach:
  Jay Wright (Villanova University)

Virgin Islands

- Steven Hodge
- Kevin Sheppard
- Carl Krauser
- Cuthbert Victor
- Jameel Heywood
- Jason Edwin
- Darnell Miller
- Kaylen Gregory
- Akeem Francis
- Carl Thomas
- Kitwana Rhymer
- Frank Elegar
- Head coach:
  Tevester Anderson

=== Women's competition ===
Argentina

- Constanza Landra
- Marina Cava
- Paula Gatti
- Marcela Paoletta
- Celeste Cabañez
- Florencia Fernández
- Alejandra Fernández
- Anastasia Saenz
- Sandra Pavón
- Laura Nicolini
- Valentina Maggi
- Alejandra Chesta
- Head coach:
  —

Brazil

- Janeth Arcain
- Graziane Coelho
- Tatiana Conceição
- Jucimara Dantas
- Patricia Ferreira
- Micaela Jacinto
- Palmira Marçal
- Isis Nascimento
- Adriana Moisés Pinto
- Karen Rocha
- Kelly Santos
- Soeli Zakrzeski
- Head coach:
  —

Canada

- Jordan Adams
- Kelsey Adrian
- Uzoma Asagawara
- Chelsea Aubry
- Amanda Brown
- Devon Campbell
- Sarah Crooks
- Gabriele Kleindienst
- Lizanne Murphy
- Tamara Tatham
- Sheila Townsend
- Carrie Watson
- Head coach:
  Alison McNeill

Colombia

- Yaneth Arias
- Luisa Atehortua
- Elena Díaz
- Laura Estrada
- Mabel Martínez
- Nancy Mesa
- Glency Mosquera
- Tathiana Mosquera
- Monica Palacios
- Yenny Pinilla
- Heissy Robledo
- Levis Torres
- Head coach:
  —

Cuba

- Yamara Amargo
- Suchitel Avila
- Yayma Boulet
- Cariola Echevarría
- Oyanaisis Gelis
- Yamilé Martínez
- Clenia Noblet
- Leidys Oquendo
- Yaquelín Plutín
- Arlenys Romero
- Yolyseny Soria
- Taimara Suero
- Head coach:
  Alberto Zabala

Jamaica

- Rashida Aikens
- Kimberly Bennett
- Latoya Byfield
- Simone Edwards
- Vanessa Gidden
- Simone Jackson
- Nicole Louden
- Antoinette Messam
- Oberon Pitterson
- Rebecca Richman
- Sharon Wiles
- Demoya Williams
- Head coach:
  —

Mexico

- Jennifer Arriola
- Veronica Carmona
- Alejandra Delgado
- Abril Selene García
- Erika Gomez
- Fernanda Gutierrez
- Lourdes Machuca
- Taine Ramírez
- Sandra Ramos
- Zazil Salman
- Brisa Silva
- Melendez Villavicencio
- Head coach:
  —

United States

- Mattee Ajavon
- Nicky Anosike
- Jayne Appel
- Marissa Coleman
- Emily Fox
- Alexis Hornbuckle
- Charde Houston
- Natasha Humphrey
- Erlana Larkins
- Angel McCoughtry
- Melanie Thomas
- Candice Wiggins
- Head coach:
  Dawn Staley
