= Sport stacking world records =

World records in sport stacking are maintained by the World Sport Stacking Association (WSSA). Sport stacking world records can be set at sanctioned WSSA events. The WSSA reviews video of potential world record attempts before certifying a time as a new world record.

In February 2021, WSSA introduced a new design for timers with thumb pads with its G5 StackMat Pro timer, and announced that all the previous records will be frozen and kept as "legacy records".

== 3-3-3 Legacy World Record Progression ==
	Time	Stacker	Competition	Date	Ref
1	2.43	Kit Fox (USA)	Denver, CO	April 9, 2005	
2	2.31	Yannick Zittlau (GER)	Germany	October 23, 2006	
3	2.22	Timo Reuhl (GER)	Germany	November 11, 2006	
4	2.11	Timo Reuhl (GER)	Denver, CO	April 15, 2007	
5	1.96	Steven Purugganan (USA)	Laurel, DE	February 16, 2008	
6	1.86	Steven Purugganan (USA)	Denver, CO	April 6, 2008	
7	1.80	Steven Purugganan (USA)	Cleveland, OH	January 3, 2009	
8	1.72	Kenneth Liao (USA)	Denver, CO	April 11, 2010	
9	1.71	Tyler Cole (CAN)	Connersville, IN	March 12, 2011	
10	1.69	Chandler Miller (USA)	Rome, GA	March 19, 2011	
11	1.68	William Polly (USA)	Dallas, TX	April 16, 2011	
12	1.63	Chandler Miller (USA)	Beaufort, SC	November 17, 2011	
13	1.59	William Orrell (USA)	Columbus, GA	February 11, 2012	
14	1.53	Chandler Miller (USA)	Columbus, GA	February 11, 2012	
15	1.482	Chandler Miller (USA)	Philadelphia, PA	May 25, 2013	
16	1.472	William Orrell (USA)	Wheeling, WV	February 8, 2014	
17	1.436	William Orrell (USA)	Kingston, GA	March 15, 2014	
18	1.424	William Orrell (USA)	Philadelphia, PA	June 7, 2014	
19	1.418	William Orrell (USA)	Wheeling, WV	February 7, 2015	
20	1.363	William Orrell (USA)	Eatonton, GA	November 14, 2015	
21	1.335	Hyeon Jong Choi (KOR)	Goyang-si, Korea	December 10, 2017	
22	1.327	Hyeon Jong Choi (KOR)	Seoul, Korea	September 16, 2018	
23	1.322	Hyeon Jong Choi (KOR)	Seoul, Korea	November 4, 2018	

=== Female ===
	Time	Stacker	Competition	Date	Ref
1	1.75	Jeanie Fung (HKG)	Kuala Lumpur, Malaysia	December 1, 2012	
2	1.683	Chu-Chun Yang (TPE)	New Taipei City, Taiwan	October 13, 2013	
3	1.674	Jeanie Fung (HKG)	Mollina, Spain	May 31, 2014	
4	1.631	Chu-Chun Yang (TPE)	New Taipei City, Taiwan	August 24, 2014	
5	1.569	Chu-Chun Yang (TPE)	Kuala Lumpur, Malaysia	November 8, 2015	
6	1.562	Si Eun Kim (KOR)	Seoul, South Korea	February 21, 2016	
7	1.545	Chu-Chun Yang (TPE)	Houston, TX	July 30, 2016	
8	1.527	Chu-Chun Yang (TPE)	New Taipei City, Taiwan	October 2, 2016	
9	1.424	Si Eun Kim (KOR)	Seoul, South Korea	November 6, 2016	

== 3-6-3 Legacy World Record Progression ==
	Time	Stacker	Competition	Date	Ref
1	2.72	Emily Fox (USA)		2001	
2	2.57	Timo Reuhl (GER)	-	January 27, 2007	
3	2.38	Steven Purugganan (USA)	Laurel, DE	February 16, 2008	
4	2.34	Steven Purugganan (USA)	Ridgewood, NJ	March 16, 2008	
5	2.19	Steven Purugganan (USA)	Philadelphia, PA	November 21, 2008	
6	2.15	Steven Purugganan (USA)	Denver, CO	April 19, 2009	
7	2.08	Kennard Gardner (USA)	Owings Mills, MD	March 13, 2010	
8	1.96	Zhewei Wu (USA)	Kintnersville, PA	March 26, 2011	
9	1.96	William Polly (USA)	Colorado Springs, CO	March 25, 2012	
10	1.932	William Polly (USA)	Wheeling, WV	March 3, 2013	
11	1.911	William Orrell (USA)	Detroit, MI	July 27, 2013	
12	1.906	William Orrell (USA)	Advance, NC	March 1, 2014	
13	1.902	William Orrell (USA)	Kingston, GA	March 15, 2014	
14	1.863	William Orrell (USA)	Philadelphia, PA	June 7, 2014	
15	1.861	William Orrell (USA)	Columbus, GA	January 31, 2015	
16	1.840	Josh Hainsel (USA)	Connersville, IN	February 28, 2015	
17	1.824	William Orrell (USA)	Beaufort, SC	May 26, 2015	
18	1.793	William Orrell (USA)	Eatonton, GA	November 14, 2015	
19	1.786	Josh Hainsel (USA)	Columbus, GA	January 7, 2017	
20	1.784	Hyeon Jong Choi (KOR)	Seoul, South Korea	March 6, 2017	
21	1.779	Chan Keng Ian (MAS)	Subang Jaya, Malaysia	June 4, 2017	
22	1.746	Hyeon Jong Choi (KOR)	Gyeonggi-do, Korea	February 10, 2018	
23	1.713	Chan Keng Ian (MAS)	Nilai, Negeri Sembilan, Malaysia	August 26, 2018	
24	1.658	Chan Keng Ian (MAS)	Seremban, Malaysia	June 9, 2019	

=== Female ===
	Time	Stacker	Competition	Date	Ref
1	2.33	Jackie Huang (CAN)	Houston, TX	July 28, 2012	
2	2.25	Jill Claas (GER)	Pforzheim, Germany	November 17, 2012	
3	2.237	Anna Smith (USA)	Kissimmee, FL	April 7, 2013	
4	2.224	Chu-Chun Yang (TPE)	New Taipei City, Taiwan	January 18, 2014	
5	2.203	Goeun Paek (KOR)	Jeonju, South Korea	March 22, 2014	
6	2.159	Chu-Chun Yang (TPE)	Jeonju, South Korea	April 27, 2014	
7	2.109	Chu-Chun Yang (TPE)	New Taipei City, Taiwan	August 24, 2014	
8	2.054	Chu-Chun Yang (TPE)	New Taipei City, Taiwan	December 13, 2014	
9	2.042	Chu-Chun Yang (TPE)	New Taipei City, Taiwan	June 6, 2015	
10	2.019	Si Eun Kim (KOR)	Kuala Lumpur, Malaysia	November 8, 2015	
11	1.996	Chu-Chun Yang (TPE)	Hsinchu City, Taiwan	December 13, 2015	
12	1.946	Si Eun Kim (KOR)	Speichersdorf, Germany	April 3, 2016	
13	1.902	Si Eun Kim (KOR)	Goyang-Si, Korea	May 21, 2016	
14	1.853	Si Eun Kim (KOR)	Seoul, Korea	February 25, 2017	
15	1.852	Si Eun Kim (KOR)	Ilsan, South Korea	May 27, 2017	
16	1.835	Si Eun Kim (KOR)	Busan, Korea	February 28, 2018	
17	1.816	Si Eun Kim (KOR)	Busan, Korea	June 16, 2018	

== Cycle Legacy World Record Progression ==
	Time	Stacker	City	Date	Ref
1	7.43	Emily Fox (USA)	Denver, CO	April 6, 2002	
2	7.41	Robin Stangenberg (GER)	Butzbach, Germany	November 25, 2006	
3	7.25	David Wolf (GER)	Denver, CO	April 17, 2007	
4	7.23	Steven Purugganan (USA)	Attica, NY	October 20, 2007	
5	7.15	David Wolf (GER)	Butzbatch, Germany	November 17, 2007	
6	6.80	Timo Reuhl (GER)	-	February 9, 2008	
7	6.65	Steven Purugganan (USA)	Laurel, DE	February 16, 2008	
8	6.52	Steven Purugganan (USA)	-	March 16, 2008	
9	6.21	Steven Purugganan (USA)	Denver, CO	April 6, 2008	
10	6.18	Steven Purugganan (USA)	Cleveland, OH	January 3, 2009	
11	5.93	Mason Langenderfer (USA)	Rochester, NY	January 29, 2011	
12	5.91	Mike McCoy (USA)	Baltic, CT	December 3, 2011	
13	5.84	William Polly (USA)	Laurel, DE	February 11, 2012	
14	5.83	Chandler Miller (USA)	Columbus, GA	February 11, 2012	
15	5.83	William Orrell (USA)	Columbus, GA	February 11, 2012	
16	5.68	William Orrell (USA)	Owings Mills, MD	March 3, 2012	
17	5.626	Son Nguyen (GER)	Stockstadt	March 2, 2013	
18	5.617	William Orrell (USA)	Advance, NC	March 16, 2013	
19	5.595	William Polly (USA)	Towson, MD	March 24, 2013	
20	5.494	William Polly (USA)	Baltic, CT	November 2, 2013	
21	5.487	William Polly (USA)	Middletown, DE	February 15, 2014	
22	5.303	William Orrell (USA)	Towson, MD	March 22, 2014	
23	5.296	Josh Hainsel (USA)	Philadelphia, PA	June 7, 2014	
24	5.280	William Orrell (USA)	Des Moines, IA	August 2, 2014	
25	5.100	William Orrell (USA)	Arlington, VA	November 8, 2014	
26	5.000	William Orrell (USA)	Columbus, GA	January 31, 2015	
27	4.813	William Orrell (USA)	Columbus, GA	January 7, 2017	
28	4.753	Chan Keng Ian (MAS)	Subang Jaya, Malaysia	May 19, 2019	

=== Female ===
	Time	Stacker	Competition	Date	Ref 33
1	6.44	Jackie Huang (CAN)	Salaberry-de-Valleyfield, Canada	April 28, 2012	
2	5.824	Chu-Chun Yang (TPE)	Bangkok, Thailand	October 13, 2013	
3	5.714	Chu-Chun Yang (TPE)	New Taipei City, Taiwan	August 24, 2014	
4	5.564	Chu-Chun Yang (TPE)	New Taipei City, Taiwan	December 13, 2014	
5	5.409	Si Eun Kim (KOR)	Daejeon, South Korea	July 27, 2016	
6	5.397	Chu-Chun Yang (TPE)	New Taipei City, Taiwan	October 30, 2016	
7	5.325	Eun Jin Jo (KOR)	Ilsan, South Korea	May 27, 2017	
8	5.246	Si Eun Kim (KOR)	Goyang-si, South Korea	December 10, 2017	
9	5.245	Si Eun Kim (KOR)	Daejeon, South Korea	December 16, 2017	
10	5.056	Si Eun Kim (KOR)	Gangman-gu, South Korea	January 25, 2018	

== Doubles Legacy World Record Progression ==
	Time	Stackers	City	Date	Ref
1	9.97	Chase Demelio (USA); Andy Retting (USA)	Denver, CO	April 9, 2005	
2	9.40	Miriam Christ (GER); Christoph Sauer (GER)	Germany	February 28, 2007	
3	8.78	Colin Stangenberg (GER); Robin Stangenberg (GER)	Denver, CO	April 15, 2007	
4	8.49	Andrew Purugganan (USA); Steven Purugganan (USA)	Attica, NY	October 20, 2007	
5	8.03	Timo Reuhl (GER); David Wolf (GER)	Butzbach	November 17, 2007	
6	7.84	Andrew Purugganan (USA); Steven Purugganan (USA)	Laurel, DE	February 16, 2008	
7	7.65	Timo Reuhl (GER); David Wolf (GER)	Denver, CO	April 6, 2008	
8	7.58	Andrew Purugganan (USA); Steven Purugganan (USA)	Denver, CO	April 19, 2009	
9	7.47	Tyler Cole (CAN); Luke Myers (USA)	Quincy, IL	September 19, 2009	
10	7.47	Jonathan Kettler (GER); Samuel Kettler (GER)	Butzbach, Germany	November 14, 2009	
11	7.47	Jonathan Kettler (GER); Samuel Kettler (GER)	Salzkotten, Germany	February 26, 2011	
12	7.41	Chase Werfel (USA); Matt Kosikowski (USA)	Dallas, TX	April 16, 2011	
13	7.09	Ryan Powell (GER); Timo Reuhl (GER)	Dallas, TX	April 16, 2011	
14	7.00	Bien Nguyen (GER); Son Nguyen (GER)	Speichersdorf, Germany	October 1, 2011	
15	6.84	Ryan Powell (GER); Timo Reuhl (GER)	Crailheim, Germany	October 22, 2011	
16	6.78	William Polly (USA); Dominic Valerian (USA)	Rochester, NY	January 28, 2012	
17	6.53	Ryan Powell (GER); Timo Reuhl (GER)	Speichersdorf, Germany	September 29, 2012	
18	6.435	Son Nguyen (GER); Nicolas Werner (GER)	Butzbach, Germany	November 16, 2013	
19	6.281	Jae Ho Jung (KOR); Si Woo Kim (KOR)	Sejong, South Korea	July 19, 2014	
20	6.209	Son Nguyen (GER); Nicolas Werner (GER)	Butzbach, Germany	January 17, 2015	
21	5.953	William Orrell (USA); William Polly (USA)	Montreal, QC, Canada	April 12, 2015	
22	5.884	Chan Keng Ian (MAS); Jun Xian Wong (MAS)	Nilai, Negeri Sembilan, Malaysia	February 17, 2019	
23	5.798	Chan Keng Ian (MAS); Jun Xian Wong (MAS)	Seremban, Malaysia	June 9, 2019	

== 3-6-3 Relay Legacy World Record Progression ==
	Time	Stackers	City	Date	Ref
1	17.90	Stack Freaks; Dominic Valerian (USA); Josh Harry (USA); Christian Dinevski (USA); Tyler Cole (CAN)	Connersville, IN	March 12, 2011	
2	15.40	SST Butzbach 18U; Timo Reuhl (GER); Jonathan Kettler (GER); Kevin Nalasko (GER); Ryan Powell (GER)	Phol Goens, Germany	March 20, 2011	
3	14.44	Winning; Mason Lagenderfer (USA); Steven Purugganan (USA); Chase Werfel (USA); Luke Myers (USA)	Dallas, TX	April 16, 2011	
4	14.38	SST Butzbach I Timo Reuhl (GER); Jonathan Kettler (GER); Kevin Nalasko (GER); Ryan Powell (GER)	Crailheim, Germany	October 22, 2011	
5	13.96	Wills & Not Wills; Mason Langenderfer (USA); William Polly (USA); Chandler Miller (USA); William Orrell (USA)	Colorado Springs, CO	March 25, 2012	
6	13.81	Team Germany 18u Timo Reuhl (GER); Jonathan Kettler (GER); Kevin Nalasko (GER); Ryan Powell (GER)	Butzbach, Germany	April 15, 2012	
7	13.81	Chosen Five; William Polly (USA); Zhewei Wu (USA); Chandler Miller (USA); William Orrell (USA)	Philadelphia, PA	June 9, 2012	
8	13.43	Wills & Not Wills; Mason Langenderfer (USA); William Polly (USA); Chandler Miller (USA); William Orrell (USA)	Houston, TX	July 27, 2012	
9	13.187	Wills & Not Wills; Mason Langenderfer (USA); William Polly (USA); Chandler Miller (USA); William Orrell (USA)	Towson, MD	March 24, 2013	
10	13.176	Asians & Not Asians; Zhewei Wu (USA); William Polly (USA); Zachary Weisel (USA); Chandler Miller (USA)	Middletown, DE	February 15, 2014	
11	13.039	Fantastic Four; Zhewei Wu (USA); William Polly (USA); Chandler Miller (USA); William Orrell (USA)	Kansas City, MO	March 30, 2014	
12	12.558	Fantastic Four; Zhewei Wu (USA); William Polly (USA); Chandler Miller (USA); William Orrell (USA)	Arlington, VA	November 8, 2014	
13	12.421	Team USA All Stars; William Polly (USA); Josh Hainsel (USA); Chandler Miller (USA); William Orrell (USA)	Montreal, Canada	April 12, 2015	
14	12.212	Fantastic Four; Zhewei Wu (USA); William Polly (USA); Chandler Miller (USA); William Orrell (USA)	Towson, MD	April 18, 2015	
15	12.187	Pro Series E William Polly (USA); Dalton Nichols (USA); William Orrell (USA); Josh Hainsel (USA)	Nottingham, MD	March 16, 2019	
