= Patrícia Ferreira =

Patrícia Ferreira may refer to:

- Patrícia Ferreira (basketball), Brazilian basketball player
- Patricia Ferreira (director), Spanish film and television director and screenwriter
- Patrícia Ferreira Pará Yxapy, indigenous Brazilian filmmaker
