= WSSA =

WSSA may refer to:

- Weed Science Society of America
- Western Social Science Association
- World Sport Stacking Association
- WIGO used the call letters from 1968 until 2007.
