= Copa Castilla y León =

Spanish basketball competition

- Sport: Basketball
- Founded: 2002
- No. of teams: 4
- Country: (Castile and León) Castile and Lion (Spain)
- Continent: Europe
- Most recent champion: CB Miraflores (3rd title)
- Broadcaster: CyLTV
- Website: BasketCyL.com

The Copa de Castilla y León (Castile and León Cup) is a basketball competition between the best teams of Castile and León, organized by the Castile and León Basketball Federation. From 2002 to 2005, the different teams where facing them every round and the final was played always against CB Valladolid, the only team in ACB in that years.

== Champions ==
| Teams | Winners | Runners-up | Winning years |
|---|---|---|---|
| CB Valladolid | 8 | 1 | 2002, 2004–05, 2005–06, 2006, 2007, 2009, 2010, 2011 |
| CB Miraflores | 3 | 1 | 2016, 2017, 2018 |
| Palencia Baloncesto | 2 | 5 | 2012, 2015 |
| CB Tizona | 2 | 0 | 2013, 2014 |
| Baloncesto León | 1 | 4 | 2003–04 |
| CB Atapuerca | 1 | 4 | 2008 |
| CB Ciudad de Valladolid | 0 | 2 | |

== History ==
Stepladder format
| Year | Host | Winner | Runner-up | Score | Final MVP |
| 2002 | Burgos | CB Valladolid | CB Atapuerca | 96–69 | |
| 2003–04 | León | Baloncesto León | CB Valladolid | 78–77 | |
| 2004–05 | Burgos | CB Valladolid | CB Atapuerca | 87–81 | |
| 2005–06 | Burgos | CB Valladolid | CB Atapuerca | 79–69 | (Spain) Fernando San Emeterio |
Final Four format
| Year | Host | Winner | Runner-up | Score | Final MVP |
| 2006 | Palencia | CB Valladolid | Baloncesto León | 89–85 | (Spain) Óscar Yebra |
| 2007 | Palencia | CB Valladolid | Baloncesto León | 71–67 | |
| 2008 | Palencia | CB Atapuerca | Baloncesto León | 73–69 | (Argentina) Diego García |
| 2009 | Palencia | CB Valladolid | Baloncesto León | 78–68 | (United States) Brian Chase |
| 2010 | Palencia | CB Valladolid | Palencia Baloncesto | 75–58 | (United States) Marcus Slaughter |
| 2011 | Palencia | CB Valladolid | Palencia Baloncesto | 63–55 | (Spain) Carles Bravo |
| 2012 | Valladolid | Palencia Baloncesto | CB Atapuerca | 82–77 | (Spain) Carles Bravo |
| 2013 | Palencia | CB Tizona | Palencia Baloncesto | 72–69 | (United States) Taylor Coppenrath |
| 2014 | Palencia | CB Tizona | Palencia Baloncesto | 78–69 | (Spain) Urko Otegui |
| 2015 | Palencia | Palencia Baloncesto | CB Miraflores | 78–72 | (Spain) Marc Blanch |
| 2016 | Palencia | CB Miraflores | Palencia Baloncesto | 91–82 | |
| 2017 | Burgos | CB Miraflores | CB Ciudad de Valladolid | 83–65 | (Netherlands) Jito Kok |
| 2018 | Burgos | CB Miraflores | CB Ciudad de Valladolid | 84–64 | |

== Results ==
=== 2002 ===
After a try in 2001 with the teams of Liga EBA, the Castile and León Federation decided to improve the tournament including in it all the elite clubs of the autonomous community. The first round was played in a one legged round-robin format by all the Liga EBA teams.

| Team | W | L | PF | PA | ZAR | ULE | CBZ | PAL |
|---|---|---|---|---|---|---|---|---|
| Zarzuela Maristas | 3 | 0 | 244 | 204 | | | 85–57 | 78–72 |
| Universidad de León | 2 | 1 | 266 | 237 | 75–81 | | | |
| CB Zamora | 1 | 2 | 218 | 248 | | 76–90 | | 85–73 |
| Ciudad de Palencia | 0 | 3 | 231 | 264 | | 86–101 | | |

Second Round; Valladolid
3 | Zarzuela Maristas | 76
4 | Autocid Ford Burgos | 88

Third round Burgos, October 8
2 | Autocid Ford Burgos | 88
Baloncesto León | 87

Final; Burgos, November 19
1 | Autocid Ford Burgos | 69
Fórum Valladolid | 96

=== 2003–04 ===
The second edition had a similar format but changing the first round. This was played with a two-legged round robin format by the four Liga EBA teams of the community.

| Team | W | L | PF | PA | PAL | LEO | OBI | ZAM |
|---|---|---|---|---|---|---|---|---|
| Ciudad de Palencia | 6 | 0 | 599 | 376 | | 93–71 | 115–46 | 91–56 |
| Universidad de León | 4 | 2 | 477 | 495 | 67–97 | | 98–96 | 71–61 |
| Óbila CB | 2 | 4 | 470 | 560 | 79–111 | 90–101 | | 94–71 |
| CB Zamora | 0 | 6 | 367 | 482 | 57–92 | 58–69 | 64–65 | |

Second round Palencia, September 30
3 | Hormigones Saldaña | 92
4 | Autocid Ford Burgos | 91

Third round Palencia, November 5
2 | Hormigones Saldaña | 98
Baloncesto León | 107

Final; León, January 20
1 | Baloncesto León | 78
Fórum Valladolid | 77

=== 2004-05 ===
Like in the first edition, the Liga EBA teams played the first round with a single-legged round-robin format.

| Team | W | L | PF | PA | SAL | AVI | ULE | UVA | ZAM |
|---|---|---|---|---|---|---|---|---|---|
| Hormigones Saldaña | 4 | 1 | 416 | 344 | | | 101–64 | 74–45 | |
| Carrefour Ávila | 3 | 2 | 400 | 393 | 85–76 | | 86–72 | | |
| Universidad de León | 2 | 3 | 390 | 422 | | 87–75 | | 68–70 | 99–90 |
| Universidad de Valladolid | 2 | 3 | 343 | 374 | 74–76 | 74–81 | | | 80–75 |
| CB Zamora | 1 | 4 | 325 | 341 | 76–89 | 84–73 | | | |

Second round Palencia, September 21
3 | Hormigones Saldaña | 71
4 | Autocid Ford Burgos | 77

Third round Burgos, November 30
2 | Autocid Ford Burgos | 86
Baloncesto León | 81

Final; Burgos, February 15
1 | Autocid Ford Burgos | 81
Fórum Valladolid | 87

=== 2005-06 ===
In this edition, the Liga EBA teams played the first round with a double-legged round-robin format. The two first qualified teams played the second round against the two LEB 2 teams.

| Team | W | L | PF | PA | BUL | PER | ZAM | ULE | SEG |
|---|---|---|---|---|---|---|---|---|---|
| Matchmind Carrefour El Bulevar | 3 | 1 | 310 | 263 | | | 85–72 | | 79–62 |
| Maderas Peralta | 2 | 2 | 307 | 283 | | 79–74 | | 74–48 | |
| UFC Zamora | 2 | 2 | 290 | 308 | 76–71 | | | | 75–72 |
| Universidad de León | 2 | 2 | 262 | 289 | | 70–69 | 80–67 | | |
| Caja Segovia | 1 | 3 | 278 | 304 | 65–86 | | | 79–64 | |

- Second round (Salamanca): Maderas Peralta Salamanca 117–118 Autocid Ford Burgos
  (Ávila): Matchmind Carrefour El Bulevar 107–116 Hormigones Saldaña

Second Round; Palencia, September 21
3 | Hormigones Saldaña | 62
4 | Autocid Ford Burgos | 71

Semifinal; Burgos, January 3
2 | Autocid Ford Burgos | 97
Baloncesto León | 83

Final; Burgos, February 14
1 | Autocid Ford Burgos | 69
Fórum Valladolid | 79

=== 2006 ===
In summer 2006, the Castile and León Basketball Federation decided to change the format of the competition adopting a Final Four format with the four elite teams of the Community. A Copa Castilla y León EBA was created for the teams of this league. This new competition was played in 2001 as a try of this tournament.

Semi-finals
31 August
Climalia León | 72
Autocid Ford Burgos | 53
31 August
Provincia de Palencia | 61
Grupo Capitol Valladolid | 85

Final
1 September
Climalia León | 85
Grupo Capitol Valladolid | 89
Third place
1 September
Provincia de Palencia | 94
Autocid Ford Burgos | 70

=== 2007 ===
The two Liga ACB teams, Grupo Capitol Valladolid and Grupo Begar León, reached the final after beating home team Alimentos de Palencia and Matchmind Carrefour respectively. The team of Ávila played its first Final Four after winning Ford Burgos in the qualifying game.

In the final, Grupo Capitol Valladolid won Grupo Begar León thanks to a great second half.

- Qualifying match (Ávila, 1 September): Matchmind Carrefour El Bulevar 99–91 Ford Burgos

Semi-finals
8 September
Grupo Begar León | 85
Matchmind Carrefour | 66
8 September
Alimentos de Palencia | 63
Grupo Capitol Valladolid | 74

Final
9 September
Grupo Capitol Valladolid | 71
Grupo Begar León | 67
Third place
9 September
Alimentos de Palencia | 92
Matchmind Carrefour | 89

=== 2008 ===
2008 edition was the first one without Liga ACB teams after the relegation of CB Valladolid and Grupo Begar León last season to LEB Oro. Also, CB Valladolid didn't play the final game for the first time of the Copa Castilla y León history, after being defeated by Grupo Begar León in two overtimes.

Ford Burgos won its first trophy after beating Faymasa Palencia in the semifinal game and Grupo Begar León in the final. Diego García was designed MVP of the tournament.

Semi-finals
6 September
Grupo Begar León | 85
CB Valladolid | 79
6 September
Faymasa Palencia | 64
Ford Burgos | 65

Final
7 September
Grupo Begar León | 69
Ford Burgos | 73
Third place
7 September
Faymasa Palencia | 81
CB Valladolid | 70

=== 2009 ===
Blancos de Rueda Valladolid recovered the Cup after beating Ford Burgos with a buzzer beater of Brian Chase and Baloncesto León, who won Matchmind Carrefour in the qualifying game and Palencia Baloncesto in the semifinal, thanks to a good defense in the last Gimel Lewis shot.

American player of Blancos de Rueda Valladolid Brian Chase was the MVP of the Copa Castilla y León.

- Qualifying match (Ávila, 4 September): Matchmind Carrefour El Bulevar 55 - Baloncesto León 68

Semi-finals
12 September
Blanco Rueda Valladolid | 70
Ford Burgos | 68
12 September
Palencia Baloncesto | 62
Baloncesto León | 64

Final
13 September
Blanco Rueda Valladolid | 78
Baloncesto León | 68
Third place
13 September
Palencia Baloncesto | 90
Ford Burgos | 87

=== 2010 ===
After beating Ford Burgos by a narrow margin in the semifinals, Palencia Baloncesto qualified for the first time to the final of the Copa Castilla y León. In this game, Blancos de Rueda Valladolid was too much team for them and the team of Liga ACB won by the widest difference in a final since there is Final Four format. American center Marcus Slaughter was the MVP of the game.

Semi-finals
4 September
Baloncesto León | 53
Blanco Rueda Valladolid | 79
4 September
Palencia Baloncesto | 67
Ford Burgos | 65

Final
5 September
Blanco Rueda Valladolid | 75
Palencia Baloncesto | 58
Third place
5 September
Baloncesto León | 95
Ford Burgos | 104

=== 2011 ===
The 2011 edition is the 10th one of this Cup and it was broadcast by CyLTV 8. This was the first Copa Castilla y León to be broadcast live.

The only Liga ACB team, Blanco Rueda Valladolid, won its eight title after beating last two season third qualified of LEB Oro Ford Burgos in a tough semifinal and home team Palencia Baloncesto, who nailed its second consecutive final after beating Baloncesto León in the overtime.

Small forward Carles Bravo was designed the MVP of the Finals. For the first time, a player of the runner-up team had this consideration.

Semi-finals
10 September
Blanco Rueda Valladolid | 67
Ford Burgos | 60
10 September
Palencia Baloncesto | 84
Baloncesto León | 80

Final
11 September
Blanco Rueda Valladolid | 63
Palencia Baloncesto | 55
Third place
11 September
Ford Burgos | 75
Baloncesto León | 65

=== 2012 ===
After the dissolution of Baloncesto León, Grupo Eulen Carrefour "El Bulevar" de Ávila was invited to join the tournament with Liga ACB team Blancos de Rueda Valladolid and LEB Oro teams Ford Burgos and Palencia Baloncesto.

For the first time ever, it will be played at Pabellón Polideportivo Pisuerga in Valladolid. Men's and women's tournament will be played in the same pavilion and in the same weekend.

Palencia Baloncesto achieved its first Cup in its history after beating Liga ACB team Blancos de Rueda Valladolid in a game where Palencia was leading by 26 points in the second quarter and defeating Ford Burgos in the final game, thanks to a great last quarter and to Carles Bravo, who was nominated by second year in a row MVP of the tournament. Bravo nailed 24 points for a rating of 32.

Semi-finals
15 September
Ford Burgos | 76
Grupo Eulen Carrefour | 72
15 September
Blanco Rueda Valladolid | 87
Palencia Baloncesto | 95

Final
16 September
Ford Burgos | 77
Palencia Baloncesto | 82
Third place
16 September
Grupo Eulen Carrefour | 90
Blanco Rueda Valladolid | 88

=== 2013 ===
After one year, the Cup came back to its most classical host: Palencia. Due to the financial trouble has CB Valladolid, the Federation of Basketball of Castile and León decided not to include the team of Liga ACB in the tournament.

The tournament will be played from 27 to 29 September with a three-game format between the three LEB teams: host team Quesos Cerrato Palencia, LEB Plata team Grupo Eulen Carrefour "El Bulevar" de Ávila and the recently created team CB Tizona, which substitutes the last LEB Oro champion CB Atapuerca, but plays with the same sponsorship naming.

Games to be played

- 27 September: Quesos Cerrato Palencia 91–72 Grupo Eulen Carrefour "El Bulevar" de Ávila
- 28 September: Grupo Eulen Carrefour "El Bulevar" de Ávila 53–86 Ford Burgos
- 29 September: Quesos Cerrato Palencia 69–72 Ford Burgos

=== 2014 ===
CB Valladolid will play again this competition after its absence in 2013, whereby the tournament comes back to the Final Four format. Three LEB Oro teams (Ford Burgos, Quesos Cerrato Palencia and CB Valladolid, relegated from Liga ACB) and one LEB Plata team (Grupo Eulen Carrefour 'El Bulevar' de Ávila) will join the competition.

The Cup was played on 26 and 27 September in Palencia and the draw was on 1 September 2014.

Semi-finals
15 September
Ford Burgos | 65
CB Valladolid | 63
15 September
Quesos Cerrato Palencia | 96
Grupo Eulen Carrefour | 63

Final
16 September
Ford Burgos | 78
Quesos Cerrato Palencia | 69
Third place
16 September
CB Valladolid | 82
Grupo Eulen Carrefour | 59

=== 2015 ===
After the dissolution of CB Valladolid and the resign to compete in professional leagues of Ford Burgos, both cities were represented by the new-creation teams CB Ciudad de Valladolid and CB Miraflores respectively. Palencia and San Pablo Inmobiliaria Burgos, the sponsorship name of Miraflores, were teams of LEB Oro at the upcoming season while the other two would play in LEB Plata.

The Cup was played on 26 and 27 September in Palencia.

Semi-finals
25 September
San Pablo Inmobiliaria Burgos | 81
Carrefour El Bulevar de Ávila | 60
25 September
Quesos Cerrato Palencia | 118
Brico Dépôt Ciudad de Valladolid | 63

Final
26 September
San Pablo Inmobiliaria Burgos | 72
Quesos Cerrato Palencia | 78
Third place
26 September
Carrefour El Bulevar de Ávila | 99
Brico Dépôt Ciudad de Valladolid | 44

=== 2016 ===
The 2016 edition was played between the two LEB Oro teams (Quesos Cerrato Palencia and San Pablo Inmobiliaria Burgos, who joined directly the semifinals) and the four LEB Plata teams, that played a previous round in Íscar. Miraflores, with the name of San Pablo Inmobiliaria Burgos won its first title, the fourth for the city of Burgos.

First round
17 September
Carrefour "El Bulevar" de Ávila | 80
Agustinos Leclerc | 63
17 September
Comercial Ulsa CBC Valladolid | 71
Aquimisa Laboratorios Queso Zamorano | 63

Semi-finals
24 September
San Pablo Inmobiliaria Burgos | 96
Carrefour "El Bulevar" de Ávila | 75
24 September
Quesos Cerrato Palencia | 86
Comercial Ulsa CBC Valladolid | 75

Final
24 September
San Pablo Inmobiliaria Burgos | 91
Quesos Cerrato Palencia | 82
Third place
25 September
Carrefour "El Bulevar" de Ávila | 67
Comercial Ulsa CBC Valladolid | 66

=== 2017 ===
The 2017 edition changed its format as it was played with only three teams. The two LEB Oro teams, (Palencia Baloncesto and Carramimbre CBC Valladolid) would play for a place in the final against the regional team in Liga ACB, San Pablo Burgos. This edition was played in Burgos.

| Semifinal; 23 September | | Final; 24 September |
| | | San Pablo Burgos | 83 |
| Palencia Baloncesto | 66 | Carramimbre CBC Valladolid | 65 |
| Carramimbre CBC Valladolid | 70 |

=== 2018 ===
The 2018 edition was held in Palencia with the same format as in the previous season.

Semi-finals
22 September
Chocolates Trapa Palencia | 95
Carramimbre CBC Valladolid | 96

Final
23 September
Carramimbre CBC Valladolid | 64
San Pablo Burgos | 84

=== 2019 ===
The 2019 edition was held again in Palencia.

Semi-finals
17 September
Chocolates Trapa Palencia
Carramimbre CBC Valladolid

Final
18 September
