= 2007 FIBA Americas Championship =

Basketball tournament in Las Vegas

Tournament details
- Host country: United States
- City: Las Vegas
- Dates: August 22 – September 2
- Teams: 10
- Venue: Thomas & Mack Center

Final positions
- Champions: United States (6th title)
- Runners-up: Argentina
- Third place: Puerto Rico
- Fourth place: Brazil

Tournament statistics
- Games played: 40
- MVP: (Argentina) Luis Scola
- Top scorer: (Brazil) Leandro Barbosa (21.8 points per game)

The 2007 FIBA Americas Championships later known as the FIBA AmeriCup (or The Tournament of the Americas), was a basketball tournament held at Thomas & Mack Center, in Las Vegas, from August 22, to September 2. It was the thirteenth staging of the FIBA AmeriCup.

The tournament was originally going to be hosted in Venezuela. However, the Venezuelan federation failed to pay a $1.5 million fee, as of August 31, 2006. As such, their hosting privileges were taken away.

Several countries had shown interest in hosting the tournament, including: United States, Chile, Argentina, and Puerto Rico. The United States had not hosted it since 1992, Chile had never hosted it, Argentina had held it last in 2001, and Puerto Rico had last hosted in 2003.

== Venues ==
All games were played at the Thomas & Mack Center, which was used earlier in the year for the 2007 NBA All-Star Game.

Las Vegas
Thomas & Mack Center
Capacity: 18,776
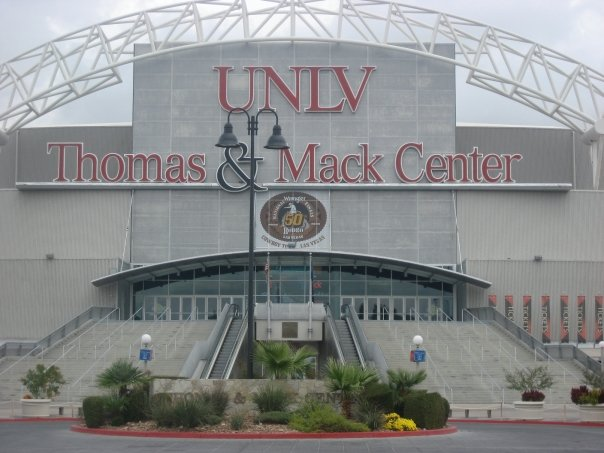

== Qualification ==
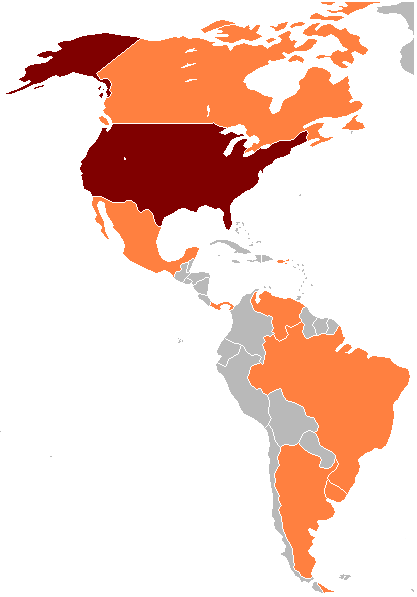
Participating countries (orange) and the host country (maroon).

Eight teams qualified during the qualification tournaments held in their respective zones in 2006; two teams (USA and Canada) qualified automatically since they are the only members of the North America zone.

- North America: Canada, United States
- Caribbean and Central America:Mexico, Panama, Puerto Rico, Virgin Islands
- South America: Argentina, Brazil, Uruguay, Venezuela

The tournament draw took place Wednesday, March 21, in Las Vegas. The teams were split into 5 pots; those drawn first went to Group A, those drawn last went to Group B.

Pot A	Pot B	Pot C	Pot D	Pot E
Argentina; United States	Brazil; Puerto Rico	Panama; Venezuela	Canada; Uruguay	Mexico; Virgin Islands

The draw split the tournament into two groups:

Group A

Argentina
Mexico
Panama
Puerto Rico
Uruguay

Group B

Brazil
Canada
United States
Virgin Islands
Venezuela

== Format ==
- The top four teams from each group advance to the quarterfinals.
- Results and standings among teams within the same group are carried over.
- The top four teams at the quarterfinals advance to the semifinals (1 vs. 4, 2 vs. 3).
- The winners in the knockout semifinals advance to the Final, where both are guaranteed of berths in the 2008 Olympics. The losers figure in a third-place playoff. The semifinal losers and the 5th best team in the quarterfinals are assured of berths to the FIBA World Olympic Qualifying Tournament 2008

=== Tie-breaking criteria ===
Ties are broken via the following the criteria, with the first option used first, all the way down to the last option:

1. Head to head results
2. Goal average (not the goal difference) between the tied teams
3. Goal average of the tied teams for all teams in its group

== Preliminary round ==
Qualified for the quarterfinals

Times given below are in United States Pacific Daylight Time (UTC-7).

=== Group A ===
Team	Pld	W	L	PF	PA	PD	Pts	Tie
Argentina	4	4	0	390	319	+71	8	
Uruguay	4	3	1	330	335	−5	7	
Puerto Rico	4	1	3	351	336	+15	5	1–1 (1.180)
Mexico	4	1	3	355	379	−24	5	1–1 (1.033)
Panama	4	1	3	338	395	−57	5	1–1 (.818)

August 22
12:30 p.m.

Boxscore

Uruguay	88–84 (OT)	Panama
Scoring by quarter: 15–18, 19–27, 24–11, 17–19, Overtime: 13–9
Pts: Batista 26; Rebs: Batista 19; Asts: Mazzarin 4		Pts: Lloreda 21; Rebs: A. García 11; Asts: A. García 2

Thomas & Mack Center, Las Vegas
Referees: Eddie Rush (USA), Carlos dos Santos (BRA)

August 22
3:00 p.m.

Boxscore

Puerto Rico	89–100	Mexico
Scoring by quarter: 29–29, 16–28, 28–19, 16–24
Pts: Apodaca 15; Rebs: Reyes 12; Asts: Barea 4		Pts: Mariscal 30; Rebs: Llamas 11; Asts: Mariscal 4

Thomas & Mack Center, Las Vegas
Referees: Miguel Angel Pérez (ESP), William Kennedy (USA)

August 23
12:30 p.m.

Boxscore

Argentina	90–69	Uruguay
Scoring by quarter: 23–13, 19–22, 29–14, 19–20
Pts: Prigioni 20; Rebs: Sandes 10; Asts: Prigioni 5		Pts: Taboada 14; Rebs: Batista 9 Asts: Mazzarino 3

Thomas & Mack Center, Las Vegas
Referees: Guerrino Cerebuch (ITA), William Kennedy (USA), David Papo (VEN)

August 23
5:30 p.m.

Boxscore

Panama	67–108	Puerto Rico
Scoring by quarter: 20–28, 11–25, 20–23, 16–32
Pts: Forbes 19; Rebs: Lloreda 8 Asts: A. García 2		Pts: Sánchez 19; Rebs: Reyes 6 Asts: Arroyo 8

Thomas & Mack Center, Las Vegas
Referees: Guerrino Cerebuch (ITA), William Kennedy (USA), David Papo (VEN)

August 24
12:30 p.m.

Boxscore

Mexico	90–95	Panama
Scoring by quarter: 29–29, 18–25, 25–24, 18–17
Pts: Beck 28; Rebs: Hernández 10; Asts: Pedroza 5		Pts: Pinnock 30; Rebs: A. García 13; Asts: Pinnock 4

Thomas & Mack Center, Las Vegas
Referees: Miguel Angel Pérez (ESP)

August 24
5:30 p.m.

Boxscore

Puerto Rico	75–87	Argentina
Scoring by quarter: 27–17, 12–18, 16–27, 20–25
Pts: Ayuso 21; Rebs: Ramos 12; Asts: Arroyo 4		Pts: Scola 22; Rebs: Scola 11; Asts: Prigioni 7

Thomas & Mack Center, Las Vegas
Referees: Guerrino Cerebuch (ITA), Carlos dos Santos (BRA), Reynaldo Mercedes (DOM)

August 25
5:30 p.m.

Boxscore

Uruguay	82–79	Puerto Rico
Scoring by quarter: 15–17, 14–31, 24–13, 29–18
Pts: Batista 34; Rebs: Batista 15; Asts: Osimani 5		Pts: Barea 18; Rebs: Reyes 12; Asts: Barea 3

Thomas & Mack Center, Las Vegas
Referees: Petr Sudek (SVK), Eddie Rush (USA), Carlos dos Santos (BRA)

August 25
8:00 p.m.

Boxscore

Argentina	104–83	Mexico
Scoring by quarter: 23–23, 28–18, 32–18, 21–24
Pts: Delfino 20; Rebs: Delfino 11; Asts: Scola 5		Pts: Beck 24; Rebs: Quintero 6 Asts: Meza 3

Thomas & Mack Center, Las Vegas
Referees: William Kennedy (USA), David Papo (VEN)

August 26
3:30 p.m.

Boxscore

Mexico	82–91	Uruguay
Scoring by quarter: 25–19, 14–27, 28–18, 15–27
Pts: Beck 28; Rebs: Ayón 12; Asts: Ayón 3		Pts: Mazzarino 36; Rebs: Batista 15; Asts: Osimani 7

Thomas & Mack Center, Las Vegas
Referees: Miguel Angel Pérez (ESP), Reynaldo Mercedes (DOM)

August 26
9:00 p.m.

Boxscore

Panama	92–109 (OT)	Argentina
Scoring by quarter: 18–30, 18–13, 27–16, 22–26, Overtime: 7–24
Pts: Forbes 29; Rebs: A. García 12; Asts: Green, Pinnock 6		Pts: Quinteros 22; Rebs: Scola 8 Asts: Prigioni 12

Thomas & Mack Center, Las Vegas
Referees: Petr Sudek (SVK), Eddie Rush (USA)

=== Group B ===
Team	Pld	W	L	PF	PA	PD	Pts
United States	4	4	0	461	267	+194	8
Brazil	4	3	1	345	344	+1	7
Canada	4	2	2	303	344	−41	6
Venezuela	4	1	3	317	383	−66	5
Virgin Islands	4	0	4	321	409	−88	4

August 22
5:30 p.m.

Boxscore

Canada	67–75	Brazil
Scoring by quarter: 12–25, 21–11, 11–18, 23–21
Pts: Mendez 18; Rebs: Dalembert 10; Asts: English 4		Pts: Barbosa 30; Rebs: Splitter 9 Asts: Barbosa 5

Thomas & Mack Center, Las Vegas
Referees: Petr Sudek (SVK), Héctor Uslenghi (URU), José Dorame (MEX)

August 22
8:00 p.m.

Boxscore

United States	112–69	Venezuela
Scoring by quarter: 21–8, 33–26, 38–17, 20–18
Pts: Anthony 17; Rebs: Howard 8 Asts: Bryant 5		Pts: Vásquez 12; Rebs: Romero 7 Asts: Vargas 3

Thomas & Mack Center, Las Vegas
Referees: Reynaldo Mercedes (DOM), José Carrión (PUR), Daniel Rodrigo (ARG)

August 23
3:00 p.m.

Boxscore

Venezuela	73–80	Canada
Scoring by quarter: 16–18, 18–19, 25–24, 14–19
Pts: Romero 23; Rebs: Bethelmy 7 Asts: Vásquez 6		Pts: Dalembert 18; Rebs: Thomas 8 Asts: Thomas 3

Thomas & Mack Center, Las Vegas
Referees: Reynaldo Mercedes (DOM), Miguel Ángel Pérez (ESP), Héctor Uslenghi (URU)

August 23
8:00 p.m.

Boxscore

Virgin Islands	59–123	United States
Scoring by quarter: 13–42, 26–24, 11–28, 9–29
Pts: Sheppard 11; Rebs: Richards 6 Asts: Sheppard 2		Pts: Anthony 22; Rebs: Prince 12; Asts: Kidd 5

Thomas & Mack Center, Las Vegas
Referees: Jorge Vazquez (PUR), Daniel Rodrigo (ARG), José Dorame (MEX)

August 24
3:00 p.m.

Boxscore

Canada	93–83	Virgin Islands
Scoring by quarter: 23–27, 30–13, 21–24, 19–19
Pts: Mendez 22; Rebs: Dalembert 8 Asts: Anderson 12		Pts: Edwin 26; Rebs: Victor 6 Asts: Sheppard 3

Thomas & Mack Center, Las Vegas
Referees: Petr Sudek (SVK), Jorge Vazquez (PUR), José Dorame (MEX)

August 24
8:00 p.m.

Boxscore

Brazil	101–75	Venezuela
Scoring by quarter: 24–19, 19–17, 28–19, 30–20
Pts: Machado 20; Rebs: Batista 5 Asts: Da Silva 8		Pts: Romero 21; Rebs: Romero 7 Asts: Vargas 4

Thomas & Mack Center, Las Vegas
Referees: Pablo Estevez (ARG), José Carrión (PUR), Daniel Rodrigo (ARG)

August 25
12:00 a.m.

Boxscore

United States	113–63	Canada
Scoring by quarter: 28–21, 37–13, 30–15, 18–14
Pts: Anthony 25; Rebs: James 8 Asts: Williams 6		Pts: Famutimi 17; Rebs: Kendall 9 Asts: Anderson 2

Thomas & Mack Center, Las Vegas
Referees: Reynaldo Mercedes (DOM), José Carrión (PUR), Daniel Rodrigo (ARG)

August 25
3:00 p.m.

Boxscore

Virgin Islands	89–93	Brazil
Scoring by quarter: 23–25, 25–16, 15–31, 26–21
Pts: Victor 25; Rebs: Rhymer 9 Asts: Sheppard 2		Pts: Barbosa 36; Rebs: Nenê 9 Asts: Da Silva 10

Thomas & Mack Center, Las Vegas
Referees: Miguel Ángel Pérez (ESP), Jorge Vazquez (PUR), Héctor Uslenghi (URU)

August 26
1:00 p.m.

Boxscore

Venezuela	100–90	Virgin Islands
Scoring by quarter: 18–16, 19–17, 35–26, 28–31
Pts: Romero 29; Rebs: Romero 10; Asts: Vásquez 10		Pts: Edwin 32; Rebs: Francis 6 Asts: Victor 6

Thomas & Mack Center, Las Vegas
Referees: José Carrión (PUR), Daniel Rodrigo (ARG), Héctor Uslenghi (URU)

August 26
6:00 p.m.

Boxscore

Brazil	76–113	United States
Scoring by quarter: 21–27, 17–30, 11–39, 27–17
Pts: Splitter 13; Rebs: Splitter 9 Asts: Da Silva 4		Pts: James 21; Rebs: Anthony 10; Asts: Kidd 5

Thomas & Mack Center, Las Vegas
Referees: Guerrino Cerebuch (ITA), Pablo Estevez (ARG), José Dorame (MEX)

== Quarterfinals ==
Qualified for the semifinals
Fifth place

The top four teams in Group A and Group B advanced to the Quarterfinal group. Then each team played the four from the other group to complete a full round robin. Records from the preliminary groups carried over, but only against teams that also advanced.

The top four teams advanced to the semifinals. The fifth-place team (Canada) did not continue competing for the Americas Championship, but qualified for the FIBA World Olympic Qualifying Tournament 2008.

=== Standings ===
Team	Pld	W	L	PF	PA	PD	Pts	Tie
United States	7	7	0	791	541	+250	14	
Argentina	7	6	1	626	530	+96	13	
Brazil	7	4	3	606	590	+16	11	
Puerto Rico	7	3	4	582	590	−8	10	1−0
Canada	7	3	4	538	586	−48	10	0−1
Uruguay	7	2	5	550	648	−98	9	1−0
Mexico	7	2	5	636	703	−67	9	0−1
Venezuela	7	1	6	522	663	−141	8	

August 27
12:30 p.m.

Boxscore

Uruguay	88–95	Canada
Scoring by quarter: 18–25, 20–23, 27–22, 23–25
Pts: Mazzarino 17; Rebs: Batista 6 Asts: García Morales 3		Pts: Young 22; Rebs: Kendall 9 Asts: English 5

Thomas & Mack Center, Las Vegas
Referees: Pablo Estevez (ARG), Jorge Vazquez (PUR), William Kennedy (USA)

August 27
3:00 p.m.

Boxscore

Argentina	98–63	Venezuela
Scoring by quarter: 28–10, 23–24, 28–19, 19–10
Pts: González 21; Rebs: Delfino 11; Asts: Prigioni 8		Pts: Cedeño 15; Rebs: Sucre 6 Asts: Cedeño 3

Thomas & Mack Center, Las Vegas
Referees: Guerrino Cerebuch (ITA), Reynaldo Mercedes (DOM), José Dorame (MEX)

August 27
5:30 p.m.

Boxscore

Brazil	75–97	Puerto Rico
Scoring by quarter: 13–19, 15–20, 26–26, 21–32
Pts: Barbosa 34; Rebs: Splitter 11; Asts: Machado 4		Pts: Ayuso 24; Rebs: Ramos 6 Asts: Barea 5

Thomas & Mack Center, Las Vegas
Referees: Petr Sudek (SVK), Miguel Ángel Pérez (ESP)

August 27
8:00 p.m.

Boxscore

United States	127–100	Mexico
Scoring by quarter: 45–23, 20–28, 36–27, 26–22
Pts: Anthony 28; Rebs: Billups 8 Asts: Kidd 7		Pts: Beck 20; Rebs: Parada 7 Asts: Pedroza 6

Thomas & Mack Center, Las Vegas
Referees: Carlos Dos Santos (BRA), Héctor Uslenghi (URU)

August 28
12:30 p.m.

Boxscore

Venezuela	89–79	Uruguay
Scoring by quarter: 25–25, 26–10, 17–20, 20–24
Pts: Romero 35; Rebs: Romero 11; Asts: Cedeño 8		Pts: Batista 21; Rebs: Batista 20; Asts: García Morales 3

Thomas & Mack Center, Las Vegas
Referees: Petr Sudek (SVK), Carlos Dos Santos (BRA)

August 28
3:00 p.m.

Boxscore

Canada	70–85	Argentina
Scoring by quarter: 8–26, 8–20, 24–16, 30–23
Pts: Thomas 13; Rebs: Dalembert 16; Asts: English 2		Pts: Scola 23; Rebs: González 11; Asts: Prigioni 11

Thomas & Mack Center, Las Vegas
Referees: Eddie Rush (USA), Miguel Ángel Pérez (ESP), Héctor Uslenghi (URU)

August 28
5:30 p.m.

Boxscore

Mexico	90–104	Brazil
Scoring by quarter: 22–24, 17–29, 24–34, 27–17
Pts: Beck 29; Rebs: Parada 10; Asts: Pedroza 5		Pts: Barbosa 21; Rebs: Splitter 9 Asts: Machado 6

Thomas & Mack Center, Las Vegas
Referees: José Carrión (PUR), William Kennedy (USA), Daniel Rodrigo (ARG)

August 28
8:00 p.m.

Boxscore

Puerto Rico	78–117	United States
Scoring by quarter: 15–24, 12–35, 29–29, 22–29
Pts: Ayuso 13; Rebs: Arroyo 6 Asts: Barea 3		Pts: James 21; Rebs: Stoudemire 8 Asts: Williams 7

Thomas & Mack Center, Las Vegas
Referees: Guerrino Cerebuch (ITA), Pablo Estevez (ARG), David Papo (VEN)

August 29
12:30 p.m.

Boxscore

Canada	97–80	Mexico
Scoring by quarter: 21–22, 26–9, 29–24, 21–25
Pts: Anderson 17; Rebs: Brown 11; Asts: Anderson 5		Pts: Quintero 20; Rebs: Ávila 5 Asts: Meza 4

Thomas & Mack Center, Las Vegas
Referees: Pablo Estevez (ARG), Carlos Dos Santos (BRA), David Papo (VEN)

August 29
3:00 p.m.

Boxscore

Venezuela	63–92	Puerto Rico
Scoring by quarter: 16–20, 19–27, 10–15, 18–30
Pts: Romero 11; Rebs: Romero 10; Asts: Vásquez 3		Pts: Ayuso 25; Rebs: Reyes 13; Asts: Arroyo 7

Thomas & Mack Center, Las Vegas
Referees: Reynaldo Mercedes (DOM), Eddie Rush (USA), Daniel Rodrigo (ARG)

August 29
5:30 p.m.

Boxscore

Argentina	86–79	Brazil
Scoring by quarter: 16–23, 12–19, 22–16, 21–13
Pts: Scola 23; Rebs: Scola 12; Asts: Prigioni 7		Pts: Machado 19; Rebs: Nenê 12; Asts: Machado 7

Thomas & Mack Center, Las Vegas
Referees: Petr Sudek (SVK), Guerrino Cerebuch (ITA), Miguel Ángel Pérez (ESP)

August 29
8:00 p.m.

Boxscore

Uruguay	79–118	United States
Scoring by quarter: 21–31, 17–35, 26–29, 15–23
Pts: Batista 20; Rebs: García Morales 6 Asts: Mazzarino 3		Pts: James 26; Rebs: Stoudemire 7 Asts: Williams 6

Thomas & Mack Center, Las Vegas
Referees: Jorge Vazquez (PUR), José Dorame (MEX)

August 30
1:30 p.m.

Boxscore

Mexico	101–91	Venezuela
Scoring by quarter: 19–27, 27–23, 31–15, 24–26
Pts: Pedroza 27; Rebs: Ávila 12; Asts: Meza 7		Pts: Romero 23; Rebs: Romero 6 Asts: Vargas 8

Thomas & Mack Center, Las Vegas
Referees: William Kennedy (USA), Héctor Uslenghi (URU)

August 30
4:00 p.m.

Boxscore

Brazil	96–62	Uruguay
Scoring by quarter: 24–17, 20–20, 30–8, 22–17
Pts: Barbosa 32; Rebs: Splitter 7 Asts: Da Silva 5		Pts: Batista 17; Rebs: Batista 10; Asts: Osimani 4

Thomas & Mack Center, Las Vegas
Referees: Eddie Rush (USA), Pablo Estevez (ARG), Reynaldo Mercedes (DOM)

August 30
6:30 p.m.

Boxscore

Puerto Rico	72–66	Canada
Scoring by quarter: 21–18, 14–16, 23–9, 14–23
Pts: Arroyo 22; Rebs: Reyes 12; Asts: Ayuso 3		Pts: Thomas 18; Rebs: Dalembert 18; Asts: English 4

Thomas & Mack Center, Las Vegas
Referees: Petr Sudek (SVK), Guerrino Cerebuch (ITA), Miguel Ángel Pérez (ESP)

August 30
9:00 p.m.

Boxscore

United States	91–76	Argentina
Scoring by quarter: 28–13, 21–17, 24–22, 18–24
Pts: Bryant 27; Rebs: Howard 9 Asts: Kidd 7		Pts: Scola 20; Rebs: Scola 5 Asts: Prigioni 4

Thomas & Mack Center, Las Vegas
Referees: José Carrión (PUR), Carlos Dos Santos (BRA)

== Medal round ==
The teams that played in the Championship Game both automatically qualified for the 2008 Olympics. The teams that played in the 3rd Place Game both automatically qualified for the FIBA World Olympic Qualifying Tournament 2008.

Semi-finals
September 1 – Las Vegas
Argentina	91
Brazil	80
September 1 – Las Vegas
United States	135
Puerto Rico	91

Final
September 2 – Las Vegas
Argentina	81
United States	118
Third place
September 2 – Las Vegas
Brazil	107
Puerto Rico	111

=== Semifinals ===
September 1
1:00 p.m.

Argentina	91–80	Brazil
Scoring by quarter: 17–22, 18–21, 30–13, 26–24
Pts: Scola 27; Rebs: Scola 9 Asts: Prigioni 5		Pts: Barbosa, Garcia 16 each Rebs: Splitter 9 Asts: da Silva 5

Thomas & Mack Center, Las Vegas

September 1
4:00 p.m.

United States	135–91	Puerto Rico
Scoring by quarter: 33–27, 24–15, 43–28, 35–21
Pts: Anthony 27; Rebs: Howard 6 Asts: James 9		Pts: Ayuso 22; Rebs: Falcón 8 Asts: Arroyo 5

Thomas & Mack Center, Las Vegas

=== Third place game ===
September 2
1:00 p.m.

Brazil	107–111	Puerto Rico
Scoring by quarter: 12–26, 31–22, 26–33, 38–30
Pts: Machado 21; Rebs: Splitter 13; Asts: da Silva, Splitter 4		Pts: Ayuso 39; Rebs: Reyes 15; Asts: Arroyo 10

Thomas & Mack Center, Las Vegas

=== Final ===
September 2
4:00 p.m.

Argentina	81–118	United States
Scoring by quarter: 14–35, 20–24, 27–34, 20–25
Pts: Scola 23; Rebs: Kammerichs 7 Asts: Scola, Porta 3 each		Pts: James 31; Rebs: Anthony 8 Asts: Bryant 8

Thomas & Mack Center, Las Vegas

== Awards ==
2007 FIBA Americas Championship winners

United States
Sixth title

== Statistical leaders ==
=== Individual Tournament Highs ===
Points

Pos.	Name	PPG
1	(Brazil) Leandro Barbosa	21.8
2	(United States) Carmelo Anthony	21.2
3	(Uruguay) Esteban Batista	20.8
4	(Mexico) Romel Beck	20.3
5	(Venezuela) Héctor Romero	19.9
6	(Argentina) Luis Scola	19.4
7	(Puerto Rico) Larry Ayuso	19.1
8	(United States) LeBron James	18.1
9	(Puerto Rico) Carlos Arroyo	16.3
10	(Uruguay) Nicolás Mazzarino	15.8

Rebounds

Pos.	Name	RPG
1	(Uruguay) Esteban Batista	12.4
2	(Puerto Rico) Angelo Reyes	9.5
3	(Canada) Samuel Dalembert	9.4
4	(Brazil) Tiago Splitter	8.0
5	(Venezuela) Héctor Romero	7.5
6	(Argentina) Luis Scola	7.4
7	(Puerto Rico) Peter John Ramos	7.1
8	(Argentina) Carlos Delfino	6.4
9	(Brazil) Nenê	6.3
10	(Mexico) Adam Parada	5.5

Assists

Pos.	Name	APG
1	(Argentina) Pablo Prigioni	5.7
2	(United States) LeBron James	4.7
3	(Puerto Rico) Carlos Arroyo	4.6
3	(United States) Jason Kidd	4.6
3	(Brazil) Valter Apolinario Da Silva	4.6
3	(United States) Deron Williams	4.6
7	(Canada) Jermaine Anderson	4.0
8	(Venezuela) José Vargas	3.5
9	(Venezuela) Greivis Vásquez	3.3
10	(Brazil) Marcelinho Machado	3.2

Steals

Pos.	Name	SPG
1	(Argentina) Carlos Delfino	2.0
1	(Mexico) Anthony Pedroza	2.0
3	(Brazil) Marcelinho Machado	1.7
3	(Argentina) Pablo Prigioni	1.7
5	(United States) Kobe Bryant	1.6
5	(Uruguay) Leandro García Morales	1.6
7	(United States) LeBron James	1.5
7	(Uruguay) Esteban Batista	1.5
7	(Venezuela) José Vargas	1.5
10	(Brazil) Valter Apolinario Da Silva	1.4

Blocks

Pos.	Name	BPG
1	(Canada) Samuel Dalembert	2.4
2	(Venezuela) Miguel Marriaga	2.0
3	(United States) Dwight Howard	1.8
4	(Puerto Rico) Peter John Ramos	1.5
5	(United States) Tyson Chandler	1.4
6	(Brazil) Tiago Splitter	1.3
7	(Mexico) Adam Parada	1.0
8	(Venezuela) Héctor Romero	0.9
9	(Mexico) Horacio Llamas	0.8
10	(Puerto Rico) Carmelo Lee	0.7

Minutes

Pos.	Name	MPG
1	(Uruguay) Esteban Batista	35.5
2	(Venezuela) Héctor Romero	34.3
3	(Brazil) Leandro Barbosa	32.0
4	(Argentina) Carlos Delfino	30.8
5	(Argentina) Pablo Prigioni	30.1
6	(Uruguay) Nicolás Mazzarino	30.0
7	(Mexico) Romel Beck	29.0
8	(Argentina) Luis Scola	28.9
9	(Brazil) Valter Apolinario Da Silva	28.8
10	(Canada) Jermaine Anderson	28.5
10	(Venezuela) José Vargas	28.5

=== Individual Game Highs ===
Department	Name	Total	Opponent
Points	(Puerto Rico) Larry Ayuso	39	Brazil
Rebounds	(Uruguay) Esteban Batista	20	Venezuela
Assists	(Canada) Jermaine Anderson	12	Virgin Islands
Steals	(Argentina) Carlos Delfino (Panama) Joel Muñoz	5	Brazil; Mexico
Blocks	(Venezuela) Miguel Marriaga	6	Uruguay
Turnovers	(Uruguay) Esteban Batista (Venezuela) Greivis Vásquez	9	Brazil; Virgin Islands

=== Team Tournament Highs ===
Offensive PPG

Pos.	Name	PPG
1	United States	116.7
2	Mexico	90.8
3	Puerto Rico	89.2
4	Argentina	88.7
5	Brazil	88.6

Defensive PPG

Pos.	Name	PPG
1	United States	71.3
2	Argentina	72.8
3	Canada	73.3
4	Brazil	79.2
5	Uruguay	81.0

Rebounds

Pos.	Name	RPG
1	Canada	42.5
2	Puerto Rico	40.6
2	Argentina	40.6
4	United States	40.0
5	Panama	39.3

Assists

Pos.	Name	APG
1	United States	25.9
2	Brazil	19.6
3	Argentina	16.9
4	Puerto Rico	15.1
5	Venezuela	14.4

Steals

Pos.	Name	SPG
1	United States	10.3
2	Mexico	9.6
3	Brazil	8.3
4	Uruguay	8.1
5	Argentina	7.8

Blocks

Pos.	Name	BPG
1	United States	6.0
2	Venezuela	4.4
3	Canada	3.9
4	Puerto Rico	2.8
5	Panama	2.7

=== Team Game highs ===
Department	Name	Total	Opponent
Points	United States	135	Puerto Rico
Rebounds	Canada	61	Mexico
Assists	Brazil; United States (2 times)	31	Mexico; Uruguay; Puerto Rico
Steals	Mexico; United States (2 times)	15	Puerto Rico; Virgin Islands; Argentina
Blocks	Venezuela	10	Uruguay
Field goal percentage	United States	69.6%	Puerto Rico
3-point field goal percentage	United States	63.9%	Puerto Rico
Free throw percentage	Puerto Rico	100% (4/4)	Canada
Turnovers	Puerto Rico	28	Uruguay

== Final standings ==
Qualified for 2008 Olympic Basketball Tournament
Qualified for FIBA World Olympic Qualifying Tournament

Rank	Team	Record
1st place, gold medalist(s)	United States	10–0
2nd place, silver medalist(s)	Argentina	8–2
3rd place, bronze medalist(s)	Puerto Rico	5–5
4	Brazil	5–5
5	Canada	4–4
6	Uruguay	3–5
7	Mexico	2–6
8	Venezuela	2–6
9	Panama	1–3
10	Virgin Islands	0–4

1st	2nd	3rd	4th
United States Chauncey Billups; Jason Kidd; LeBron James; Deron Williams; Michael Redd; Tayshaun Prince; Kobe Bryant; Dwight Howard; Amar'e Stoudemire; Mike Miller; Tyson Chandler; Carmelo Anthony	Argentina Luis Scola; Pablo Prigioni; Román González; Diego Lo Grippo; Juan Pedro Gutiérrez; Antonio Porta; Carlos Delfino; Martín Leiva; Leonardo Gutiérrez; Paolo Quinteros; Matías Sandes; Federico Kammerichs	Puerto Rico Peter John Ramos; José Juan Barea; Filiberto Rivera; Carlos Arroyo; Rick Apodaca; Alex Falcon; Larry Ayuso; Ricky Sánchez; Angelo Reyes; Héctor Valenzuela; Carmelo Lee; Ángel Figueroa	Brazil Marcelinho Machado; Nezinho Dos Santos; Murilo Becker; Marcelinho Huertas; Alex Garcia; Valter Apolinario Da Silva; Leandro Barbosa; João Paulo Batista; Guilherme Giovannoni; Nenê; Marcus Vinicius; Tiago Splitter
