= Luis Cequeira =

Argentine basketball player (born 1985)

Quilmes de Mar del Plata
- Position: Point guard
- League: Liga Nacional de Básquet

Personal information
- Born: February 4, 1985 (age 41) Resistencia, Chaco, Argentina
- Listed height: 5 ft 11 in (1.80 m)

Career information
- Playing career: 2001–present

Career history
- 2001–2005: Quilmes de Mar del Plata
- 2005–2008: Boca Juniors
- 2008–2009: Regatas Corrientes
- 2009–2010: Juventud Sionista
- 2010–2011: Obras Sanitarias
- 2011–2013: Juventud Sionista
- 2013–2014: Boca Juniors
- 2014–2016: Quilmes de Mar del Plata
- 2017–2018: Argentino de Junín
- 2018–2021: Club Comunicaciones
- 2022–present: Quilmes de Mar del Plata

Career highlights
- Argentine League champion (2007)
Medals
Men's basketball
Representing Argentina
FIBA South American Championship
Gold medal – first place	2008 Puerto Montt
Silver medal – second place	2010 Neiva

Luis Eduardo Cequeira (born February 4, 1985) is an Argentine professional basketball player. He plays at the point guard position. He has been a member of the Argentine national basketball team.

== Professional career ==
Cequeira began his professional career in the Argentine League with Quilmes Mar del Plata during the 2001–02 season. He has since competed on four other teams while spending his career in the Argentine league. In the 2006–07 season, he helped Boca Juniors win the league title while being named League Sixth Man of the Year. Cequeira has competed in the Liga Sudamericana, the top international competition for South American basketball clubs, on three occasions – 2006, 2008, and 2009.

After spending the 2009–10 season with Juventud Sionista, Cequeira signed a one-year deal with fellow Argentine side Obras Sanitarias on May 19, 2010.

== National team career ==
Cequeira is also a member of the senior men's Argentine national basketball team. He made his debut with the senior Argentine national team in 2007 at the 2007 Pan American Games. He later participated at the 2008 and 2010 South American Championship, helping the team to a gold medal in 2008 and a silver medal in 2010.

In 2010, Cequeira was named to Argentina's 2010 FIBA World Championship squad – his first major international tournament – when long-time point guard Juan Pablo Cantero withdrew with a torn hamstring.
