= Romel Beck =

American basketball player

Personal information
- Born: May 29, 1982 (age 44) Magdalena de Kino, Mexico
- Listed height: 6 ft 7 in (2.01 m)
- Listed weight: 192 lb (87 kg)

Career information
- High school: Etiwanda (Etiwanda, California)
- College: UNLV (2003–2005)
- NBA draft: 2005: undrafted
- Playing career: 2005–2017
- Position: Small forward / shooting guard

Career history
- 2005: Correcaminos UAT Victoria
- 2006: Titanes de Morovis
- 2006: Correcaminos UAT Victoria
- 2007: Gatos de Monagas
- 2007–2008: Cimberio Varese
- 2008: Capo d'Orlando
- 2008–2009: Dakota Wizards
- 2009: Tecolotes de la UAG
- 2009–2010: Dakota Wizards
- 2010: Guaros de Lara
- 2010–2011: Trenkwalder Reggio Emilia
- 2011: Guaros de Lara
- 2011: Pioneros de Quintana Roo
- 2011–2012: Ikaros Kallitheas
- 2012–2013: Bnei Herzliya
- 2013: Leones de Ponce
- 2013: Ikaros Chalkidas
- 2014–2016: Pioneros de Quintana Roo
- 2016: Garzas de Plata Hidalgo
- 2016–2017: Aguacateros de Michoacan

Career highlights
- LNBP champion (2016); LNBP All-Star (2006); NBA D-League All-Star (2010)

Romel Roberto Beck-Castro (born May 29, 1982) is a Mexican professional basketball player who last played for Aguacateros de Michoacan of the Liga Nacional de Baloncesto Profesional (LNPB). He also played for the Mexico national basketball team.

Beck is probably best known for crossing over Kobe Bryant and scoring a rare four-point play against the USA Men's basketball guard during the 2007 FIBA Americas Championship.

After having decided against playing for KK Zadar of Croatia, Beck signed to play for Los Tecos of Universidad Autónoma de Guadalajara of the Mexican Basketball Federation in 2008 for two months.

Beck previously played in Italy with Pierrel Capo d'Orlando and Varese.

Romel Beck was drafted by the Florida Flame in the first round of the NBDL Draft, and he played for them for a season. Beck played collegiately at UNLV.

Beck played for the San Antonio Spurs in the 2009 NBA Summer League and recently signed a non-guaranteed contract with the Houston Rockets. He has been subsequently waived.

Beck was leading scorer for the Dakota Wizards of the NBA Development League.

Season 2012–13 he spent in Israeli Basketball Super League with Bnei Herzliya. During the summer of 2013, he played with Leones de Ponce in Puerto Rico. He then returned to Ikaros, but left them in January 2014, and signed with Pioneros de Quintana Roo.
