= Mbyá-Guarani Cinema Collective =

Brazil-based video and visual arts production collective

The Mbyá-Guarani Cinema Collective (also Guarani Film Collective or Coletivo Mbyá-Guarani de Cinema) is a Brazil-based video and visual arts production collective, focused on Guaraní culture. It was founded in 2007 by Patrícia Ferreira Pará Yxapy. The collective produces and disseminates work on a national and international level.

Within the last 15 years Mbyá-Guarani Cinema Collective, together with Patrícia Ferreira Pará Yxapy and the NGO Video nas Aldeias (Video in the Villages – VIV), created numerous film and video works which have been presented internationally. The collective has participated in festivals around the world, such as Berlinale Berlin, and conferences like Indigenous Peoples’ Engagement with Digital and Electronic Media in Nashville, Tennessee.

The Mbyá-Guarani Cinema Collective sees the film-making process as holistic, interconnected to community, nature and the cosmos. In this case, the Indigenous filmmakers are not shooting a subject matter outside of themselves; rather, they are working and creating within a collective, interdependent, and interconnected understanding of their world order, positioning video technology as immersed into their ecosystem.

== Filmography ==
- Bicicletas de Nhanderu (Bicycles of Nhanderu) 2011, 45 min
- Desterro Guarani (Guarani Exile) 2011, 38 min
- Tava: A casa de pedra (Tava: The Stone House), 2012, 78 min
- Mbya-Mirim, 2013, 22 min
- No caminho com Mario (On the way with Mario) 2014, 20 min
- Letter from a Guarani Woman in Search of the Land Without Evil
