= Patrícia Ferreira Pará Yxapy =

Brazilian filmmaker (born 1985)

Patrícia Ferreira Pará Yxapy (born May 25, 1985) is an indigenous Brazilian filmmaker, born in Kunhã Piru village at the border of Argentina and Brazil. Since 2000 she has lived in Koenju, a village of indigenous people in São Miguel das Missões. She has participated in shows and festivals in Brazil and worldwide, such as the American Native Film Festival, forumdoc.bh, Lugar do Real, Berlinale, FINCAR, among others.

== Career ==
Encouraged by the workshop of Video nas Aldeias (Video in the Villages - VIV) in 2007 Patrícia Ferreira Pará Yxapy co-founded the Mbyá-Guarani Cinema Collective, dedicated to producing videos and visual art focussing on the Guaraní culture. Videos nas Adeleidas was created in 1987 and is a precursor project in the area of indigenous audiovisual production in Brazil.

Her filmmaking is informed by a spirituality relation to land, self and community. It is based on the indigenous gaze, which is a shared gaze that relies on a self-represented, political image of self. In 2014 and 2015 she worked together with Inuit Indigenous filmmakers for an artistic residency in Canada. Together with Ariel Duarte Ortega she co-directed 2011 the award-winning film Bicicletas de Nhanderu, an insight in everyday life of the Mbya-Guarani from the Koenju village in Southern Brazil. The exhibition Letter from a Guaraní Woman in Search of the Land Without Evil in 2020, curated by Brazilian filmmaker and visual artist Anna Azevedo at SAVVY Contemporary, Berlin presents a collection of recent works. At its core is an archive of an audiovisual journey which follows the jeguatá, an ancestral practice of the Mbya-Guarani culture. It means "to walk" in its original language and is rooted both the mythical dimension of the practice to visit relatives, exchange planting seeds and raw materials for making handicrafts or even to search for new territories to build their villages. The project is documented in the artists' travel diary entitled Jeguatá: Caderno de Viagem where she artist goes in search of a "Land Without Evil" which is accessible in a bilingual edition (Portuguese and Guarani).:

"The relationships between Jeguatá and our audiovisual production greatly surprised us during the process. During the listening part of this work, in addition to recent events, we were told many stories, so we focused on listening to better understand the narrative we would like to establish (...). It was also a new experience for us to address a deep and spiritual subject to non-indigenous people. A challenge of co-existence, of seeking this meaning of the sacred journey through such interaction." (Patrícia Ferreira Para Xyapy)

The notebook follows a journey that started in January 2017, travelling from village to village mostly by car and lasted for about 15 days that artists Ana Carvalho, Fernando Ancil and indigenous filmmakers Ariel Duarte Ortega and Patrícia Ferreira Pará Yxapy made from Koenju to Pindó Poty in Argentina. More than a mere online documentation, the Jeguatá project can be seen as an online installation, there is no traditional menu, but an index that refers to a table of dreams, and different other associations which link to documents, photos and videos.

== Filmography ==
- As Bicicletas de Nhanderu (2011)
- Desterro Guarani (2011)
- TAVA, a casa de pedra (2012)
- Mbya Mirim (2013)
- No caminho com Mario (2014)

== Awards ==
- 2015 – Best Short Film by the Official Jury and Honorable Mention by the Young Jury of the VI Documentary Film Festival of Cachoeira (CachoeiraDoc), held at the Center for Arts, Humanities and Letters (CAHL) of the Federal University of Recôncavo da Bahia (UFRB), in the city of Cachoeira (BA), for the film No caminho com Mario.
- 2012 – Honorable Mention of the IX International Environmental Film Festival (Fica), held in the City of Goiás (GO), for the film Desterro Guarani.
- 2011 – Cora Coralina Award for best feature film of the XIII Fica, directed in the City of Goiás (GO) for the film Bicicletas de Nhanderu.
- 2011 – Best feature/media award of the III CachoeiraDoc, directed at the Center for Arts, Humanities and Letters (CAHL) of the Federal University of Recôncavo da Bahia (UFRB), in the city of Cachoeira (BA), for the film Bicicletas de Nhanderu.
- 2011 – Honorable Mention of Forumdoc.BH.'s National Competitive Exhibition for the film Bicicletas de Nhanderu.
