= Graziane de Jesus Coelho =

Brazilian basketball player (born 1983)

Personal information
- Born: 18 January 1983 (age 42); São Paulo, Brazil

Sport
- Sport: Basketball

Graziane de Jesus Coelho (born 18 January 1983) is a Brazilian basketball player. She competed in the women's tournament at the 2008 Summer Olympics.
