= Jesse Young =

Jesse Young may refer to:

- Jesse Young (basketball)
- Jesse Young (politician)
- Jesse Colin Young, American singer and songwriter
