= Emily Fox (basketball) =

American basketball player (born 1987)

Emily Fox (born April 23, 1987) is an American former basketball player and former world record holder in sport stacking. She set the overall world record in the cycle (7.43 seconds) in April 2002 and the 3–6–3 (2.72 seconds). However, in 2006, her cycle record was beaten (by Robin Stangenberg from Germany with a time of 7.41 seconds). Her 3–6–3 record was also broken in 2007 by Robin Stangenberg and Yannick Zittlau of Germany with a time of 2.70 seconds. She has appeared on several television shows, including The Ellen DeGeneres Show and The Late Late Show with Craig Ferguson, to demonstrate her skills.

Emily is the eldest child of Bob Fox, the founder of Speed Stacks, and grew up in Highlands Ranch, Colorado. Her two brothers, Kit and Brennan, are also successful at sport stacking. Kit also wrote a book and twice completed the Chicago Marathon.

Fox played basketball in high school and college. In her senior year at ThunderRidge High School, she led the team to a number 7 finish in the USA Today high school national poll and was named a Parade Magazine high school All-American. She played college basketball for the University of Minnesota. In her four years she averaged 11.7 points per game. In April 2009 she was drafted in the third round of the WNBA draft by the Minnesota Lynx. In 2007, she was a member of the gold medal–winning basketball team at the Pan American Games.

== Sport stacking ==
=== Marquee tournament results ===
Year	Tournament	Location	Event	Time	Division	Division Place	Overall Place	Ref
2002	Rocky Mountain Championships	Colorado Springs, Colorado	Cycle	7.43	9–12	1st	1st	
2003	World Championships	Denver, Colorado	3–6–3	2.98	9–12	1st	1st	
2003	World Championships	Denver, Colorado	Cycle	13.21	9–12	2nd	42nd	
2004	World Championships	Denver, Colorado	3–6–3	3.02	9–12	1st	1st	
2004	World Championships	Denver, Colorado	Cycle	8.79	9–12	2nd	4th	
2007	World Championships	Denver, Colorado	3–3–3	2.66	Collegiate	2nd	39th	
2007	World Championships	Denver, Colorado	3–6–3	2.96	Collegiate	1st	18th	
2007	World Championships	Denver, Colorado	Cycle	7.97	Collegiate	1st	9th	

== Basketball ==
Emily Fox
Medal record

Women's Basketball

Representing United States

Pan American Games
Gold medal – first place	2007 Brazil	Team competition

=== Minnesota statistics ===
Legend
GP	Games played	GS	Games started	MPG	Minutes per game
FG%	Field goal percentage	3P%	3-point field goal percentage	FT%	Free throw percentage
RPG	Rebounds per game	APG	Assists per game	SPG	Steals per game
BPG	Blocks per game	PPG	Points per game	**Bold**	Career high

Year	Team	GP	Points	FG%	3P%	FT%	RPG	APG	SPG	BPG	PPG
2005–06	Minnesota	27	65	38.1	28.6	61.9	1.2	1.0	0.7	0.1	2.4
2006–07	Minnesota	**33**	425	42.1	35.0	80.7	**4.6**	4.0	2.1	0.4	12.9
2007–08	Minnesota	32	**549**	**42.9**	**38.8**	**83.6**	3.3	**4.2**	**2.5**	**0.7**	**17.2**
2008–09	Minnesota	32	410	37.1	33.1	70.7	3.1	3.8	2.3	0.2	12.8
Career	Minnesota	124	1449	40.7	35.2	78.1	3.1	3.3	2.0	0.3	11.7
