= Sport stacking =

Sport involving stacking and unstacking cups as swiftly as possible

Sport Stacking
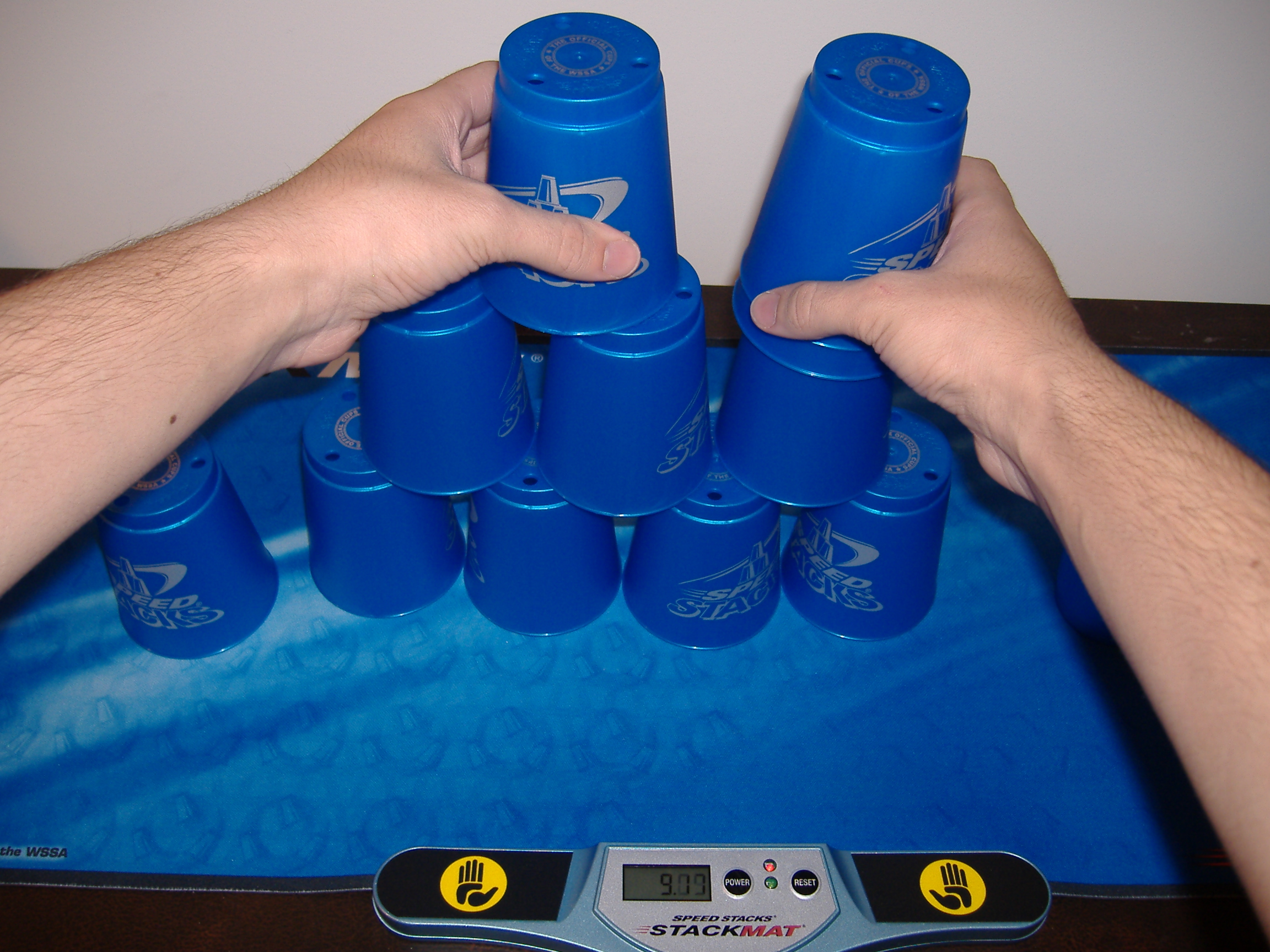
- A 1–10–1 being upstacked with blue HY cups in cycle.
- Highest governing body: World Sport Stacking Association
- Nicknames: Cup stacking, speed stacking
- First played: 1981, Oceanside, California, United States
- Registered players: 737,863

Characteristics
- Contact: No
- Team members: Individual, doubles, teams of 4 or 5
- Mixed-sex: Yes, but in separate divisions
- Type: Indoor, Outdoor
- Equipment: Cups, mat, timer

Presence
- Country or region: Worldwide
- Olympic: No

Sport stacking, also known as cup stacking or speed stacking, is an individual and team sport that involves stacking 9–12 specially designed cups in predetermined sequences as quickly as possible. The cups are specially designed with holes to allow for air to pass through. Participants of sport stacking stack cups in specific sequences by aligning the inside left lateral adjunct of each cup with that of the next. Sequences are usually pyramids of 3, 6, or 10 cups. Players compete against the clock or another player.

The governing body setting the rule is the World Sport Stacking Association (WSSA). Sport Stacking competitions are for all ages.

== History ==
While working for the Boys & Girls Club of Oceanside, California, in 1981, Wayne Godinet came up with the idea for sport stacking. When the children he was working with were tired of playing traditional sports, he took paper cups and asked them to stack them as fast as possible. The sport was well received, so Godinet decided to acquire plastic cups to be used by his club. He quickly discovered that his new plastic cups would stick together, so Godinet modified the cups by adding a hole in the bottom of the cups. He formed his own company, Karango Cupstack Co., which manufactured and distributed these modified cups in a variety of colors. By the end of the decade, Godinet estimated he had sold approximately 25,000 sets of cups. During the 1980s, Godinet hosted the annual National Cupstacking Championship in Oceanside. One of the national champions was Matt Adame, a member of Godinet's club, the "Professional Cupstack Drill Team". In November 1990, Adame and his teammates were featured on The Tonight Show Starring Johnny Carson.

After the sport received national attention on The Tonight Show, Bob Fox, a physical education teacher from Colorado, introduced stacking to his students. Fox's enthusiasm led to the creation of the annual Colorado state tournament in 1997. In 1998, Fox, together with Larry Goers, created a line of proprietary sport stacking products including the patented timing system known as the StackMat. Fox started traveling across the country in 2000 to promote Speed Stacks full-time. In 2001 Fox founded the World Cup Stacking Association (WCSA) to formalize the sport's rules and sanction competitions worldwide. As the sport began to spread to neighboring states, the WCSA hosted the first Rocky Mountain Cup Stacking Championships, where Fox's daughter, Emily Fox, broke her own world record by completing the cycle in 7.43 seconds. The next year, the first WCSA World Championship took place at the Denver Coliseum and has since been held annually. The WCSA formally titled the sport "sport stacking" and changed their name to the World Sport Stacking Association (WSSA) in 2005. The WSSA cited the public recognition that stacking is considered a sport as the reason for the name change.

== Equipment ==
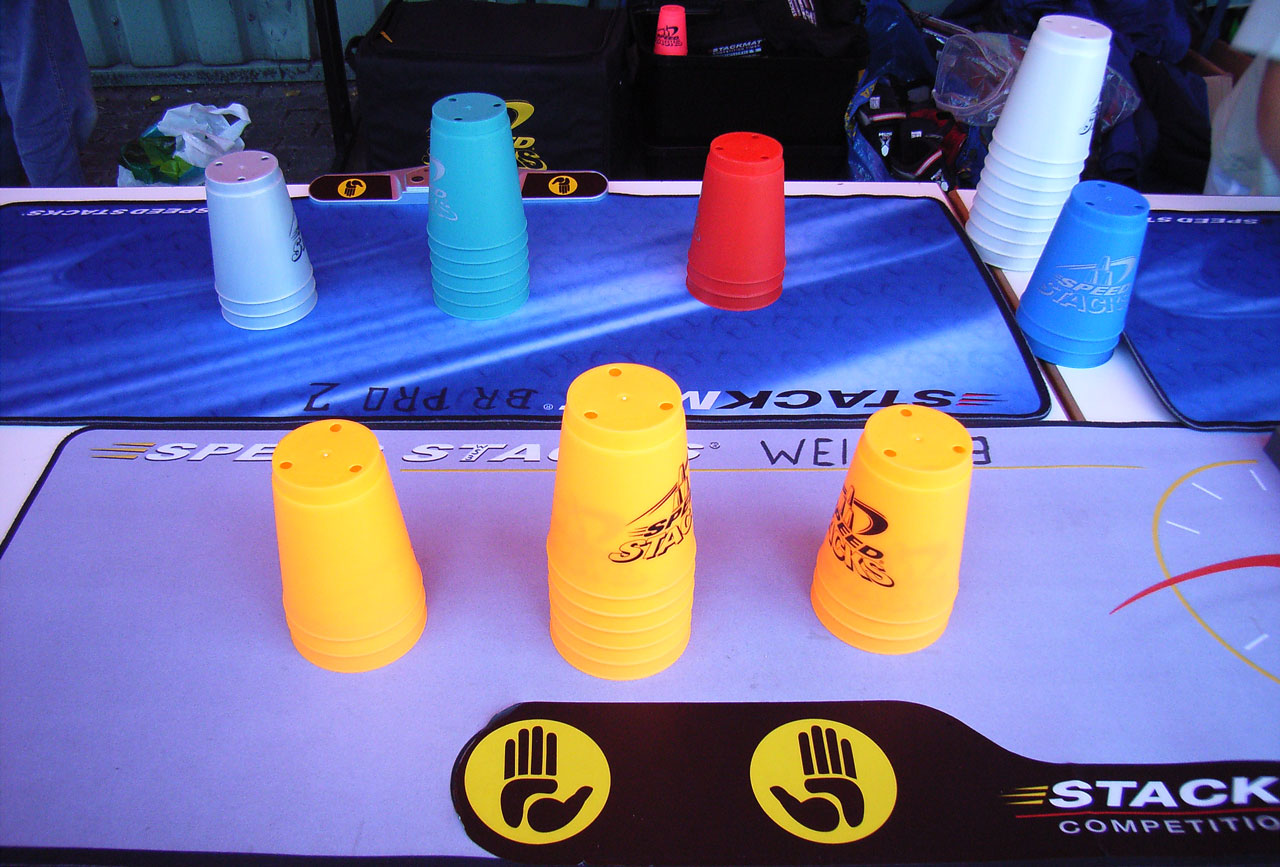
Sport stacking cups

Official sport stacking cups are specially designed to prevent sticking and to allow the competitor to go faster. The cups are reinforced with several ribs on the inside which separate the cups when they are nestled. The exterior is slightly textured to allow better grip. The insides are very smooth and slide past each other easily. The tops of the cups have 1–4 holes to allow ventilation so the cups do not stick. One special line of cups has cups without tops to further decrease air resistance.

StackMat timers are used for official tournament timing, as well as casual play timing or practice timing.

Special weighted training cups, called "Super Stacks," are made from metal and are most commonly used directly before competing. The added weight is intended to make the regular cups feel lighter.

Jumbo Stacks are a bigger version of the original speed stacks cups. They are used more commonly in P.E. classes rather than at home.

== Rules ==
There are three sequences stacked in official sport stacking events, that are defined by the rule book handed out by the WSSA:

- 3–3–3: Uses nine cups. This sequence consists of three sets of three cups each. The three sets must be stacked going from left-to-right or right-to-left, and then down-stacked into their original positions in the same order as the up-stack.
- 3–6–3: Uses 12 cups. This sequence is similar to the 3–3–3, except a six stack replaces the three stack in the middle. Each pile of cups is stacked up from left-to-right or right-to-left, and the down-stack occurs in the same order.
- Cycle: Uses 12 cups. This sequence involves a 3–6–3 which is then down-stacked and then going into a 6–6 stack which is down-stacked again and finally stacked into a 1–10–1 and all down-stacked back into how it started.

== Benefits ==
Proponents of the sport say participants learn cooperation, ambidexterity and hand–eye coordination.

A university study by Brian Udermann, currently at the University of Wisconsin–La Crosse, confirms that stacking improves hand–eye coordination & reaction time by up to 30% (published in the scientific Journal "Perceptual and Motor Skills" in 2004)

An EEG study by Melanie A. Hart at Texas Tech University support the claim that cup stacking does use both sides of the brain. During the left-hand condition, activity in the right hemisphere was larger than the left, while for the right-hand task, the left hemisphere was greater than the right. Their scientific poster on that topic got awarded by the AAHPERD On the other hand, Hart couldn't get the same results as Udermann when studying improvement on reaction time.

Researchers at the State University of New York studied the effects on the reaction time and confirmed Udermann rather than Hart, stating, "that the results agreed with the claims made by Speed Stacks, in which practicing cup stacking can improve reaction time." They also state "Even 1 hour of cup stacking practice can improve reaction time in young adults." Speed stacking was also seen as helping people improve in other sports because it helps to improve hand–eye coordination.

The Department of Kinesiology at Towson University studied the influence of participation in a 6-week bimanual coordination program on Grade 5 students' reading achievement with Sport Stacking being the bimanual activity. In a pilot study, a significant increase was found for the experimental group on comprehension skills, suggesting that Sports Stacking may improve students' reading comprehension skills, regardless of sex.

In 2007 cup-stacking was tested in a study at the University of Nevada, Las Vegas, investigating learning as a pair and the advantages of practising together concluding that observation was of greater importance than conversation in learning from a partner. These results are not restricted to cup-stacking alone but reflect the scientific acceptance of the sport.

== Competition ==
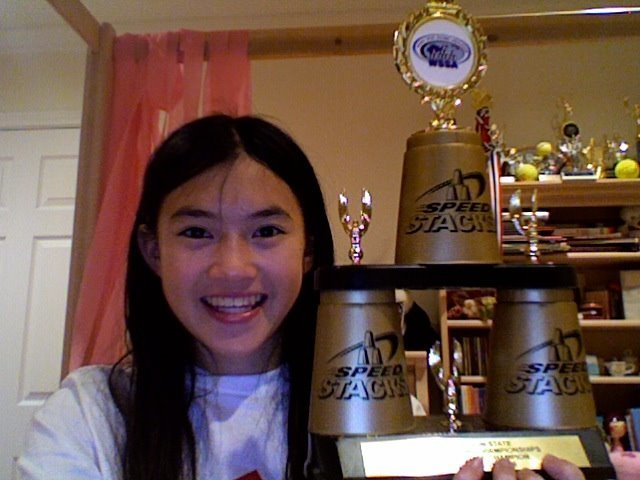
Rachael Nedrow with a trophy from the 2009 Oregon Sport Stacking Championships

Most sport stacking competitions are geared toward children. There are also divisions for "Special Stackers" (disabled competitors).

The WSSA has set the following protocol for the setting of world records:

1. Must use WSSA-approved sport stacking cups.
2. Must use a StackMat and tournament display.
3. Must be videotaped for review and verification purposes.
4. Must use 2 judges (one designated Head Judge) to judge each try. After each try, the 2 judges confer. The head judge will then designate with a color-coded card the outcome of that try. (Green: clean run; yellow: try in question (immediate video review); and red: scratch.)
5. A finals judge may not be a family member or the sport stacking instructor of the stacker.

The competition's divided into 14 different age divisions, ranging from 6 & under to seniors (65 & up). State, national, and world records are recorded on the WSSA website.

== World records ==
The global record for "Most People Sport Stacking at Multiple Locations", recognized by the WSSA, stands at 746,698 students representing 2,242 schools and organizations. This was accomplished from November 14–16, 2023, during the 2023 edition of the annual "STACK UP!" event held by the WSSA.

=== Male(G5 only) ===
| Event | Time | Stacker |
|---|---|---|
| 3–3–3 | 1.392 | William Orrell (USA) |
| 3–6–3 | 1.751 | Chan Keng Ian (MYS) |
| Cycle | 4.739 | Chan Keng Ian (MYS) |

=== Female(G5 only) ===
| Event | Time | Stacker |
|---|---|---|
| 3–3–3 | 1.463 | Sama Basaw (Chinese Taipei) |
| 3–6–3 | 1.868 | Si Eun Kim (KOR) |
| Cycle | 4.996 | Si Eun Kim (KOR) |

=== Combined(G5 only) ===
| Event | Time | Stackers |
|---|---|---|
| Doubles | 5.603 | Chan Keng Ian (MYS); Woo XinYi (MYS) |
| 3–6–3 Relay | 12.234 | Frisbee! William Allen (USA); Dalton Nichols (USA); William Orrell (USA); Tyler Hollis (USA) |

== See also ==
- Speedcubing
