= Angelo Reyes (basketball) =

Puerto Rican basketball player

No. 97 – Leones de Ponce
- Position: Power forward
- League: Baloncesto Superior Nacional

Personal information
- Born: September 18, 1981 (age 45) New York
- Listed height: 6 ft 7 in (2.01 m)
- Listed weight: 255 lb (116 kg)

Career information
- College: Neosho County CC (2001–2002)
- Playing career: 2002–present

Career highlights
- LNB champion (2014); 3× BSN champion (2006, 2010, 2013); BSN Most Valuable Player (2007); 2× All-BSN First Team (2006, 2007); All-BSN Second Team (2008); All-BSN Defensive First Team (2006); 4× BSN All-Star (2006–2008, 2010); BSN Rebounding champion (2006); BSN Offensive rebounding champion (2006); Rank #6 in BSN All-time offensive rebounds leaders; Puerto Rico Athlete of the year (2007)
Medals
Men's basketball
Representing Puerto Rico
FIBA AmeriCup
Silver medal – second place	2009 Puerto Rico
Bronze medal – third place	2007 United States
Pan American Games
Silver medal – second place	2007 Brazil
Centrobasket
Gold medal – first place	2008 Mexico
FIBA CBC Championship
Gold medal – first place	2007 Puerto Rico
Central American and Caribbean Games
Gold medal – first place	2006 Colombia

Angelo Reyes (born September 18, 1981) is a Puerto Rican professional basketball player. Reyes was born in New York he has played in the United States American Basketball Association, the Premier Basketball League, the Dominican Republic Liga Nacional de Baloncesto, the Mexico Liga Nacional de Baloncesto Profesional, the Uruguayan Federacion Uruguaya de Basquetbol FUBB, the Australian National Basketball League, and the Puerto Rican Baloncesto Superior Nacional. Reyes has been a member of the Puerto Rican National Team since 2006.

== Professional career ==
Reyes played junior-college ball at Neosho County Community College in Kansas. He has since played in the Baloncesto Superior Nacional (BSN) with Titanes de Morovis (2002), Criollos de Caguas (2004) Caciques de Humacao (2005), Criollos de Caguas (2006) Reyes led Caguas to the 2006 Puerto Rican championship and led the league in rebound, Gigantes de Carolina, (2007-2009) Reyes won the 2007 Most Valuable Player (MVP) 2008 lost the championship in 7 games, Capitanes de Arecibo, (2010) Reyes won the 2010 Puerto Rican championship with Arecibo, Cangrejeros de Santurce. (2011), Piratas de Quebradillas (2013-2015) Reyes won the 2013 Puerto Rican championship with Quebradillas, Leones de Ponce (2016). Reyes has led the BSN in rebounding. He is currently rank #6 in All-Time offensive rebounds leaders in BSN history. Reyes was selected Most Valuable Player of the league in 2007 while playing with the Gigantes de Carolina after averaging 19.7 PPG and 11.9 RPG.

Reyes was a member of the Puerto Rican National Basketball Team in 2006, participating in the Central American and Caribbean Games earning the Gold Medal, and at the World Championship in Japan.

Due to Reyes' outstanding play during the 2007 FIBA Americas Championship, he earned an invitation to the Milwaukee Bucks preseason training camp.

Reyes was excluded from the roster of the Milwaukee Bucks and released because of failing his physical due to injury. Reyes signed with the Wollongong Hawks for the NBL season,

In August 2008, he signed with Hebraica y Macabi in Uruguay.

== National team career ==
During the summer of 2007, Reyes represented Puerto Rico as a member of the Puerto Rican National Basketball Team during the 2007 Pan American Games winning the Silver Medal, CaribeBasket 2007 winning the Gold Medal, and the 2007 FIBA Americas Championship winning the Bronze Medal. On this tournament, Reyes was second in rebounds per game averaging 9.5, outrebounding players like Amar'e Stoudemire and Dwight Howard. He is represented by agent, Ralph Menar.

On October 2, 2007, Reyes was excluded from the roster of the Milwaukee Bucks and released because of failing his physical due to injury. Reyes signed with the Wollongong Hawks for the 2007–08 NBL season,
