= World Sport Stacking Association =

Governing body of Sport Stacking

- Sport: Sport stacking
- Jurisdiction: International
- Abbreviation: WSSA
- Founded: 2001
- Headquarters: Larkspur, Colorado
- Sponsor: Speed Stacks

Official website
- www.thewssa.com

The World Sport Stacking Association (WSSA) is the international governing body for sport stacking. The WSSA, which is headquartered in Larkspur, Colorado, sanctions stacking competitions worldwide and maintains world and national records for the sport.

== History ==
In 2001, Bob Fox, the founder of the cup manufacturer Speed Stacks, formed the World Cup Stacking Association (WCSA). The WCSA formally renamed themselves the World Sport Stacking Association to coincide with the new name for the sport in 2005.
