= Patrícia Ferreira (basketball) =

Brazilian basketball player (born 1979)

Patrícia "Chuca" de Oliveira Ferreira (born March 21, 1979, in Mauá) is a Brazilian basketball player. At the 2008 and 2012 Summer Olympics, she competed for the Brazil women's national basketball team in the women's event. She is 6 ft 0 in (1.83 m) tall.
