= Diego García (basketball) =

Argentine basketball player

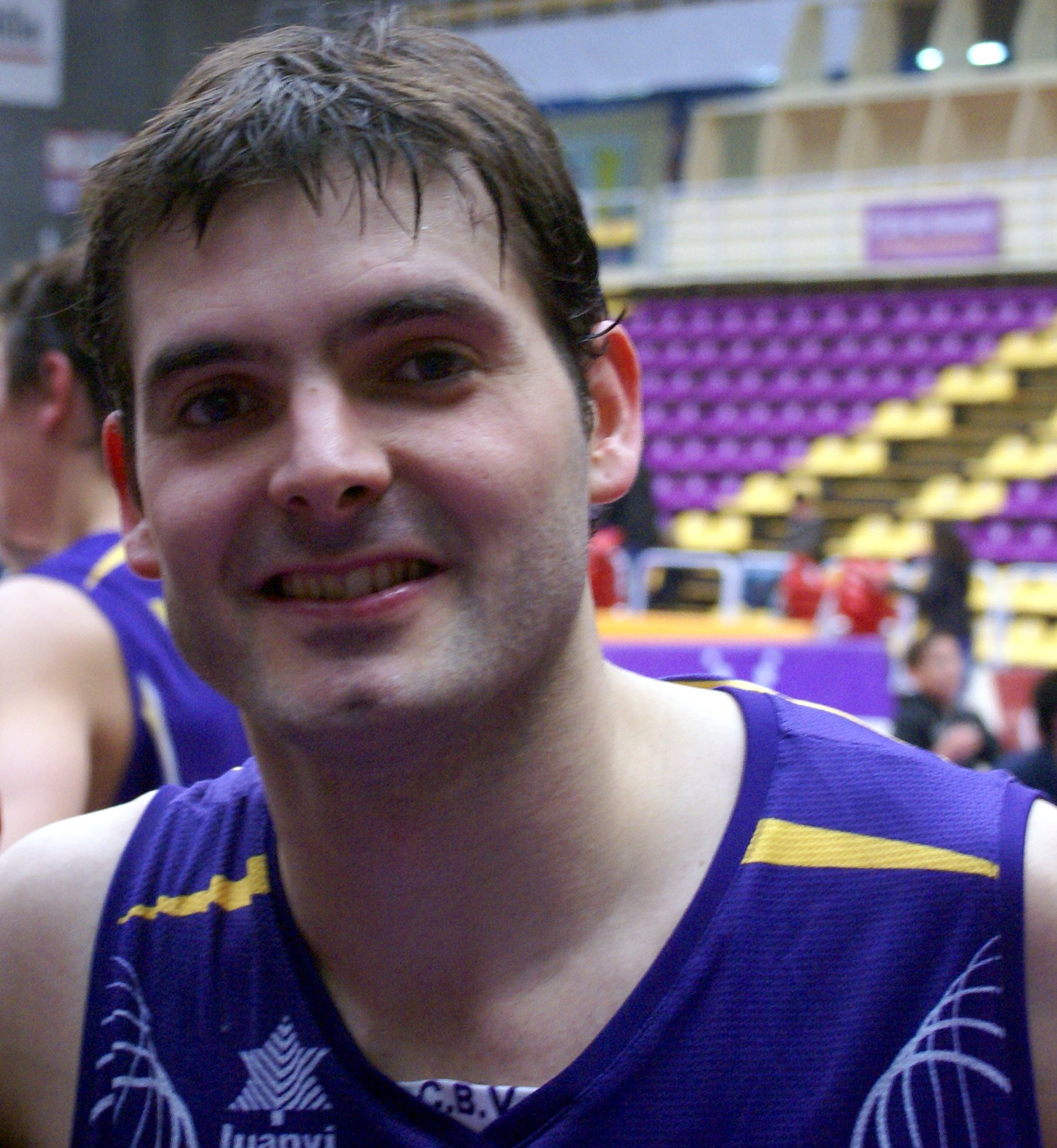

No. 7 – Club La Unión
- Position: Shooting guard
- League: Argentine LNB

Personal information
- Born: September 15, 1979 (age 47) Santa Fe, Argentina
- Listed height: 1.90 m (6 ft 3 in)

Career information
- Playing career: 2002–present

Career history
- 2002–2003: Central Entrerriano
- 2003–2004: Estudiantes de Olavarría
- 2004–2006: Club Sportivo Ben Hur
- 2006–2007: Regatas Corrientes
- 2007–2009: Ford Burgos
- 2009–2012: CB Valladolid
- 2012–2014: Libertad de Sunchales
- 2014–2016: Quimsa
- 2016–2017: La Unión

Career highlights
- Bronze medal in FIBA Americas Championship 2009
Medals
Men's basketball
Representing Argentina
FIBA AmeriCup
Bronze medal – third place	2009 San Juan
FIBA South American Championship
Bronze medal – third place	2006 Caracas
Gold medal – first place	2008 Puerto Montt

Diego García (born September 15, 1979) is an Argentine professional basketball player. He currently plays for Club La Unión in Argentina. He is also a member of the Argentina national basketball team.

== National team career ==
Garcia is also a long-time member of the Argentine national basketball team. He participated with the team at the 2006 and 2008 South American Championships. In his most recent appearance with the national team, he averaged 2.5 points per game while seeing action in all ten of Argentina's games FIBA Americas Championship 2009.
