= 2024–25 in Uruguayan basketball =

Competitive basketball season in Uruguay

Basketball in Uruguay
- Season: 2024–25

Men's basketball
- Liga Uruguaya de Básquetbol: Nacional
- Liga de Ascenso: Goes
- DTA: Atenas
- OBL: Ferro Carril
- Torneo Litoral Norte: Ferro Carril

Women's basketball
- Liga Femenina de Básquetbol: Defensor Sporting
- Copa de Plata: Juventud

The 2024–25 season is a competitive basketball season in Uruguay. It started at the end of June, with the end of the 2023–24 Liga Uruguaya de Básquetbol, and will be end, at the end of May, with the 2024–25 finals.

== National teams ==
=== Uruguay men's national basketball team ===
==== Results and fixtures ====
===== Friendlies =====
27 July 2024	Uruguay	81–70	Argentina	Paysandú, Uruguay
21:00 UTC−3	Scoring by quarter: 16–15, 15–18, 27–19, 23–18
	Pts: Martínez 13; Rebs: Rojas 9 Asts: Rojas 5	Boxscore	Pts: Negrete 21; Rebs: Lema 6 Asts: Five players 2	Arena: Estadio 8 de Junio; Attendance: 2,000; Referees: Julio Dutra (ARG), Aline García (URU), Guillermo Abreu (URU)

===== 2025 FIBA AmeriCup qualification =====
====== Group B ======
Pos	Team	Pld	W	L	PF	PA	PD	Pts	Qualification
1	Brazil	6	5	1	524	370	+154	11	2025 FIBA AmeriCup
2	Uruguay	6	4	2	495	403	+92	10	2025 FIBA AmeriCup
3	Panama	6	3	3	491	490	+1	9	2025 FIBA AmeriCup
4	Paraguay	6	0	6	372	619	−247	6	

Source: FIBA
Rules for classification: 1) points; 2) head-to-head points; 3) head-to-head points difference; 4) head-to-head number of points scored.

21 November 2024	Brazil	71–65	Uruguay	Belém, Brazil
20:00 UTC−3	Scoring by quarter: 15–19, 18–9, 19–23, 19–15
	Pts: Caboclo 21; Rebs: Caboclo 11; Asts: Elinho 7	Boxscore	Pts: Rodríguez 20; Rebs: Serres 5 Asts: Pomoli 5	Arena: Arena Guilherme Paraense; Attendance: 5,014; Referees: Roberto Vázquez (PUR), Krishna Domínguez (MEX), Carmelo De la Rosa (PUR)

24 November 2024	Paraguay	69–86	Uruguay	Pilar, Paraguay
19:40 UTC−3	Scoring by quarter: 21–29, 16–19, 23–16, 9–22
	Pts: Sarubbi 14; Rebs: Poisson 7 Asts: Riveros 3	Boxscore	Pts: Parodi 22; Rebs: Pomoli 13; Asts: Parodi 8	Arena: Polideportivo Municipal Roberto Cabañas; Attendance: 2,200; Referees: Daniel García (VEN), Edwin Quiles (PUR), Yezid Carreño (COL)

21 February 2025	Uruguay	61–70	Brazil	Paysandú, Uruguay
20:10 UTC−3	Scoring by quarter: 13–21, 21–21, 14–10, 13–18
	Pts: Iglesias 14; Rebs: Three players 5 Asts: Rodríguez 6	Boxscore	Pts: Georginho 20; Rebs: Georginho 11; Asts: Yago, Georginho 2	Arena: Estadio 8 de Junio; Attendance: 1,617; Referees: Daniel García (VEN), Williset Del Valle (PUR), Franco Anselmo (ARG)

24 February 2025	Uruguay	107–60	Paraguay	Paysandú, Uruguay
20:00 UTC−3	Scoring by quarter: 30–12, 25–27, 29–12, 23–9
	Pts: Pomoli 14; Rebs: Serres 9 Asts: Vescovi 8	Boxscore	Pts: Mercado 16; Rebs: Ruiz 6 Asts: Benítez 5	Arena: Estadio 8 de Junio; Referees: Juan Fernández (ARG), Carmelo De la Rosa (PUR), Claudio Osorio (CHI)

=== U–15 ===
==== 2024 FIBA U15 South American Championship ====
===== Group A =====
Pos	Team	Pld	W	L	PF	PA	PD	Pts	Qualification
1	Brazil	4	4	0	279	192	+87	8	Semifinals
2	Venezuela	4	3	1	322	194	+128	7	Semifinals
3	Chile	4	2	2	272	217	+55	6	5th–8th place playoffs
4	Uruguay	4	1	3	252	240	+12	5	5th–8th place playoffs
5	Bolivia	4	0	4	113	395	−282	4	

Source: FIBA

21 October 2024	Chile	66–56	Uruguay	Pasaje, Ecuador
16:30 UTC−5	Scoring by quarter: 21–16, 18–10, 7–14, 20–16
	Pts: La Rivera 19; Rebs: Díaz 11; Asts: Musrri 4	Boxscore	Pts: Pastrana 20; Rebs: Maneiro 10; Asts: Three players 3	Arena: Coliseo César Fadul Dibb; Referees: Carlos Pallares (COL), Romina Morales (ARG), Santiago Alcaraz (PAR)

22 October 2024	Uruguay	100–34	Bolivia	Pasaje, Ecuador
19:30 UTC−5	Scoring by quarter: 29–9, 29–8, 20–7, 22–10
	Pts: Ramírez 15; Rebs: Ramírez 13; Asts: Taborda 6	Boxscore	Pts: Fontan, Antelo 10; Rebs: García 9 Asts: Three players 2	Arena: Coliseo César Fadul Dibb; Referees: Carlos Pallares (COL), Romina Morales (ARG), Mariajesús González (CHI)

23 October 2024	Venezuela	73–33	Uruguay	Pasaje, Ecuador
15:00 UTC−5	Scoring by quarter: 26–10, 17–5, 17–4, 13–14
	Pts: Vásquez 15; Rebs: Díaz 10; Asts: Torres 5	Boxscore	Pts: Taborda 7 Rebs: Pereyra, Maneiro 6 Asts: Cruz 3	Arena: Coliseo César Fadul Dibb; Referees: José De María (PAN), Romina Morales (ARG), Santiago Alcaraz (PAR)

25 October 2024	Uruguay	63–67(OT)	Brazil	Pasaje, Ecuador
15:00 UTC−5	Scoring by quarter: 11–16, 16–9, 17–16, 10–13, Overtime: 9–13
	Pts: Pastrana 26; Rebs: Maneiro, Cruz 7 Asts: Torres 5	Boxscore	Pts: Taborda 7 Rebs: Pereyra, Maneiro 6 Asts: Carbajales 5	Arena: Coliseo César Fadul Dibb; Referees: Romina Morales (ARG), Javier Triana (ECU), Santiago Alcaraz (PAR)

===== 5th–8th place playoffs =====
26 October 2024 5th SF	Colombia	48–65	Uruguay	Pasaje, Ecuador
12:30 UTC−5	Scoring by quarter: 10–18, 13–20, 8–17, 17–10
	Pts: Becerra 9 Rebs: Bernal 7 Asts: Becerra, Bernal 3	Boxscore	Pts: Pereyra 12; Rebs: Maneiro, Pereyra 10; Asts: Taborda 5	Arena: Coliseo César Fadul Dibb; Attendance: 100; Referees: César Gonçalves (BRA), Romina Morales (ARG), Javier Triana (ECU)

26 October 2024 5thPM	Chile	66–63	Uruguay	Pasaje, Ecuador
15:00 UTC−5	Scoring by quarter: 15–15, 26–13, 8–21, 17–14
	Pts: La Rivera 19; Rebs: Westermeier 8 Asts: Musrri 7	Boxscore	Pts: Pastrana 22; Rebs: Pastrana 12; Asts: Cruz 5	Arena: Coliseo César Fadul Dibb; Attendance: 20; Referees: Sandy Maldonado (VEN), Crislaine Alves (BRA), Santiago Alcaraz (PAR)

=== 3x3 ===
==== Results and fixtures ====
===== 2024 FIBA 3x3 AmeriCup =====
====== Pool A ======
Pos	Team	Pld	W	L	PF	PA	PD	Qualification
1	United States	2	2	0	41	20	+21	Quarter-finals
2	Mexico	2	1	1	35	33	+2	Quarter-finals
3	Uruguay	2	0	2	20	43	−23	

Source: FIBA
Rules for classification: 1) Wins; 2) Head-to-head record; 3) Points scored.

13 December 2024	United States	21–7	Uruguay	San Juan, Puerto Rico
17:20 UTC−4
	Pts: Parrott, Travis 8 Rebs: Caruso 7	Boxscore	Pts: Benvenuti, Da Costa 3 Rebs: Benvenuti 6	Arena: Distrito T-Mobile; Referees: Ángel Martínez (PUR), Fernando Saavedra (CHI)

14 December 2024	Mexico	22–13	Uruguay	San Juan, Puerto Rico
18:35 UTC−4
	Pts: Zesati 12; Rebs: Calatayud 6	Boxscore	Pts: Benvenuti 6 Rebs: Benvenuti 9	Arena: Distrito T-Mobile; Referees: Hélio Santos (BRA), Deanna Jackson (USA)

=== Uruguay women's national basketball team ===
==== Results and fixtures ====
===== 2024 South American Women's Basketball Championship =====
====== Group A ======
Pos	Team	Pld	W	L	PF	PA	PD	Pts	Qualification
1	Argentina	4	4	0	333	193	+140	8	Semifinals
2	Brazil	4	3	1	304	217	+87	7	Semifinals
3	Chile (H)	4	2	2	246	281	−35	6	5–8th place semifinals
4	Bolivia	4	1	3	222	298	−76	5	5–8th place semifinals
5	Uruguay	4	0	4	215	331	−116	4	

Source: FIBA
Rules for classification: 1) Points; 2) Head-to-head results; 3) Points difference; 4) Points scored.
(H) Hosts

31 August	Chile	80–64	Uruguay	Santiago, Chile
20:00 UTC−4	Scoring by quarter: 14–16, 23–19, 21–13, 22–16
	Pts: Ovalle 23; Rebs: Cousiño 9 Asts: Basaez, Ovalle 6	Boxscore	Pts: C. Fernández 20; Rebs: Niski 8 Asts: Pereira 6	Arena: Centro de Deportes Colectivos; Attendance: 3,152; Referees: Carmelo De la Rosa (PUR), Lauren Niemiera (USA), Carlos Pallares (COL)

1 September	Uruguay	50–87	Brazil	Santiago, Chile
17:30 UTC−4	Scoring by quarter: 18–25, 12–14, 3–24, 17–24
	Pts: C. Fernández 9 Rebs: Auza 9 Asts: Zeballos 4	Boxscore	Pts: Emanuely 18; Rebs: Sassá 10; Asts: Nicoletti 8	Arena: Centro de Deportes Colectivos; Referees: Orlando Varela (HON), Nicolás Flores (PAR), Carlos Pallares (COL)

2 September	Argentina	97–45	Uruguay	Santiago, Chile
20:00 UTC−4	Scoring by quarter: 30–7, 18–11, 21–19, 28–8
	Pts: Chagas 17; Rebs: Cabrera, D'Urso 7 Asts: D'Urso 7	Boxscore	Pts: Zeballos 13; Rebs: Four players 4 Asts: Auza, Pereira 2	Arena: Centro de Deportes Colectivos; Attendance: 229; Referees: Carlos Vélez (COL), Nicolás Flores (PAR), Julirys Guzmán (PUR)

4 September	Uruguay	56–67	Bolivia	Santiago, Chile
17:30 UTC−4	Scoring by quarter: 13–13, 14–11, 18–15, 11–28
	Pts: Zeballos 13; Rebs: Molina 13; Asts: Fernández 8	Boxscore	Pts: Padilla 16; Rebs: Herbas 6 Asts: Prado, Padilla 5	Arena: Centro de Deportes Colectivos; Attendance: 229; Referees: Kristian Páez (ECU), Carlos Vélez (COL), Carlos Pallares (COL)

=== U–15 ===
==== Results and fixtures ====
===== 2024 FIBA U15 Women's South American Championship =====
====== Group B ======
Pos	Team	Pld	W	L	PF	PA	PD	Pts	Qualification
1	Argentina	3	3	0	196	123	+73	6	Semifinals
2	Brazil	3	2	1	146	171	−25	5	Semifinals
3	Ecuador	3	1	2	180	180	0	4	5th–8th place playoffs
4	Uruguay	3	0	3	143	191	−48	3	5th–8th place playoffs

Source: FIBA

6 November 2024	Uruguay	40–68	Argentina	Barquisimeto, Venezuela
14:30 UTC−4	Scoring by quarter: 8–17, 8–20, 8–12, 16–19
	Pts: Franca 19; Rebs: Gómez 5 Asts: Mañana 3	Boxscore	Pts: Miró 25; Rebs: Roldán 9 Asts: Cherot 6	Arena: Domo Bolivariano; Attendance: 235; Referees: João Varella (BRA), Leinel Pino (VEN), Raúl Aguilar (CHI)

7 November 2024	Ecuador	65–55	Uruguay	Barquisimeto, Venezuela
14:30 UTC−4	Scoring by quarter: 8–13, 17–13, 20–12, 20–17
	Pts: López 18; Rebs: Three players 7 Asts: López 5	Boxscore	Pts: Franca 17; Rebs: Sosa 11; Asts: Ribolla 4	Arena: Domo Bolivariano; Referees: María Alejandra Sanabria (ARG), Raúl Aguilar (CHI), Leinel Pino (VEN)

8 November 2024	Brazil	58–48	Uruguay	Barquisimeto, Venezuela
14:30 UTC−4	Scoring by quarter: 17–10, 18–7, 10–18, 13–13
	Pts: Isa Koerich 17; Rebs: Júlia 16; Asts: Ana Moreira 3	Boxscore	Pts: Franca 15; Rebs: Figueredo 8 Asts: Mañana, Ribolla 4	Arena: Domo Bolivariano; Referees: María Alejandra Sanabria (ARG), Daniel Jiménez (MEX), Leinel Pino (VEN)

====== 5th–8th place playoffs ======
9 November 2024 5th SF	Chile	66–51	Uruguay	Barquisimeto, Venezuela
12:00 UTC−4	Scoring by quarter: 8–16, 21–18, 14–10, 23–7
	Pts: Jiménez 20; Rebs: Silva 13; Asts: Lagos 3	Boxscore	Pts: Franca 15; Rebs: Figueredo 8 Asts: Mañana, Ribolla 4	Arena: Domo Bolivariano; Attendance: 320; Referees: Sandy Maldonado (VEN), Sindi León (COL), Leinel Pino (VEN)

10 November 2024 7thPM	Uruguay	55–47	Bolivia	Barquisimeto, Venezuela
12:00 UTC−4	Scoring by quarter: 11–17, 9–9, 17–13, 18–8
	Pts: Franca 14; Rebs: Bertinat 12; Asts: Ribolla 4	Boxscore	Pts: Salazar 19; Rebs: Mamani 8 Asts: Villarroel 3	Arena: Domo Bolivariano; Attendance: 452; Referees: Daniel Sancho (CRC), Raúl Aguilar (CHI), Sindi León (COL)

=== 3x3 ===
==== Results and fixtures ====
===== 2024 FIBA 3x3 AmeriCup =====
====== Pool A ======
Pos	Team	Pld	W	L	PF	PA	PD	Qualification
1	United States	2	2	0	42	18	+24	Quarter-finals
2	Dominican Republic	2	1	1	30	32	−2	Quarter-finals
3	Uruguay	2	0	2	15	37	−22	

Source: FIBA
Rules for classification: 1) Wins; 2) Head-to-head record; 3) Points scored.

14 December 2024	Uruguay	11–16	Dominican Republic	San Juan, Puerto Rico
18:10 UTC−4
	Pts: Fernández, Barragan 4 Rebs: Fernández 6	Boxscore	Pts: F. Marte 9 Rebs: F. Marte 5	Arena: Distrito T-Mobile; Referees: Marie-Pier Houle (CAN), Hélio Santos (BRA)

14 December 2024	United States	21–4	Uruguay	San Juan, Puerto Rico
19:40 UTC−4
	Pts: Siegrist, Stevens 6 Rebs: Siegrist 5	Boxscore	Pts: Four players 1 Rebs: Fernández, Cordara 1	Arena: Distrito T-Mobile; Referees: Marie-Pier Houle (CAN), Hélio Santos (BRA)

== FIBA competitions ==
=== Liga Sudamericana de Baloncesto ===
==== Group A ====
Pos	Team	Pld	W	L	PF	PA	PD	Pts	Qualification	NAC	SLA	ANC	CDO	CRS
1	(Uruguay) Nacional	4	4	0	340	263	+77	8	Advance to Final Four				90–73	
2	(Argentina) San Lorenzo	4	3	1	330	292	+38	7	Advance to Final Four	73–87				97–88
3	(Chile) ABA Ancud	4	2	2	297	320	−23	6			55–83			
4	(Chile) Coolbet Español de Osorno (H)	4	1	3	291	314	−23	5		59–79	62–77	72–85		98–73
5	(Ecuador) Santa María	4	0	4	294	363	−69	4		58–84		75–84		

Source: FIBA
(H) Hosts

==== Group B ====
Pos	Team	Pld	W	L	PF	PA	PD	Pts	Qualification	OLI	DSC	OBR	DSJ	POT
1	(Argentina) Olímpico (H)	4	4	0	397	359	+38	8	Advance to Final Four			107–106	90–73	92–85
2	(Uruguay) Defensor Sporting	4	3	1	327	295	+32	7	Advance to Final Four			83–77		
3	(Argentina) Obras	4	2	2	384	335	+49	6					101–77	
4	(Paraguay) San José	4	1	3	319	357	−38	5			69–73			90–74
5	(Bolivia) Nacional Potosí	4	0	4	287	368	−81	4			60–86	68–100		

Source: FIBA
(H) Hosts

==== Semi-finals ====
Team 1	Score	Team 2
Nacional (Uruguay)	76–58	(Uruguay) Defensor Sporting

==== Third-place match ====
Team 1	Score	Team 2
Defensor Sporting (Uruguay)	68–73	(Argentina) Olímpico

==== Final ====
1 December 2024
20:40 UTC−3

Report

Nacional (Uruguay)	77–76 (OT)	(Argentina) San Lorenzo
Scoring by quarter: 22–12, 7–23, 20–11, 18–21, Overtime: 10–9
Pts: Semiglia 16; Rebs: Espíndola 12; Asts: Sarni, Colmenares 4		Pts: Grun 19; Rebs: Lugo, Grun 8 Asts: Pérez 10

Estadio 8 de Junio, Paysandú, Uruguay
Referees: Julio Anaya (PAN), Omar Bermúdez (MEX), Alan Dos Santos (BRA)

=== Basketball Champions League Americas ===
==== Group C ====
Pos	Team	Pld	W	L	PF	PA	PD	Pts	Qualification
1	(Brazil) KTO Minas	6	6	0	489	420	+69	12	Advance to quarter-finals
2	(Argentina) Quimsa	6	2	4	430	459	−29	8	Advance to quarter-finals
3	(Uruguay) Biguá	6	1	5	423	463	−40	7	

Source: FIBA
Rules for classification: 1) Points; 2) Head-to-head results; 3) Points difference; 4) Points scored.

12 December 2024	Quimsa (Argentina)	70–72	(Uruguay) Biguá	Santiago del Estero, Argentina
22:10 UTC−3	Scoring by quarter: 18–23, 11–13, 14–13, 27–23
	Pts: Pérez 19; Rebs: Miller 15; Asts: Brussino, Sansimoni 4	Boxscore	Pts: Espinosa 16; Rebs: Cunningham 10; Asts: Spight 8	Arena: Estadio Ciudad; Attendance: 100; Referees: Grant Todey (USA), Carlos Vélez (COL), Daniel Flores (PAR)

13 December 2024	Biguá (Uruguay)	60–73	(Brazil) KTO Minas	Santiago del Estero, Argentina
22:10 UTC−3	Scoring by quarter: 18–17, 9–20, 16–22, 17–14
	Pts: Cerminato 12; Rebs: Payovich 6 Asts: Three players 3	Boxscore	Pts: Montero 17; Rebs: Paranhos 11; Asts: Machado 4	Arena: Estadio Ciudad; Attendance: 50; Referees: Juan Fernández (URU), Nicolás Flores (PAR), Orlando Varela (HON)

12 January 2025	Biguá (Uruguay)	77–85	(Brazil) KTO Minas	Paysandú, Uruguay
20:10 UTC−3	Scoring by quarter: 11–25, 21–23, 16–17, 29–20
	Pts: Cerminato, Spight 13; Rebs: Payovich, Cerminato 6 Asts: Espinosa 5	Boxscore	Pts: Fuzaro 18; Rebs: Montero 14; Asts: Four players 3	Arena: Estadio 8 de Junio; Referees: Johnny Batista (PUR), Daniel García (VEN), Carmelo De la Rosa (PUR)

14 January 2025	Biguá (Uruguay)	66–79	(Argentina) Quimsa	Paysandú, Uruguay
20:10 UTC−3	Scoring by quarter: 12–20, 24–23, 17–9, 13–27
	Pts: Spight 21; Rebs: Cunningham 7 Asts: Espinosa, Spight 3	Boxscore	Pts: Romano 18; Rebs: Miller 6 Asts: Brussino 6	Arena: Estadio 8 de Junio; Attendance: 552; Referees: Johnny Batista (PUR), Fernando Leite (BRA), Carmelo De la Rosa (PUR)

9 February 2025	Quimsa (Argentina)	75–71	(Uruguay) Biguá	Belo Horizonte, Brazil
19:10 UTC−3	Scoring by quarter: 14–18, 22–10, 15–20, 24–23
	Pts: Brussino 13; Rebs: Ali, Miller 7 Asts: Romano 3	Boxscore	Pts: Spight 23; Rebs: Cerminato 13; Asts: Cerminato, Spight 4	Arena: Arena Minas Tênis Clube; Referees: Jorge Vázquez (PUR), Alan Dos Santos (BRA), Samuel Hidalgo (DOM)

10 February 2025	KTO Minas (Brazil)	81–77	(Uruguay) Biguá	Belo Horizonte, Brazil
19:10 UTC−3	Scoring by quarter: 22–19, 19–20, 20–21, 20–17
	Pts: Yuri 21; Rebs: Paranhos 11; Asts: Baralle 5	Boxscore	Pts: Pastor 16; Rebs: Payovich 10; Asts: Rodríguez 4	Arena: Arena Minas Tênis Clube; Referees: Krishna Domínguez (MEX), Roberto Fernández (CRC), Samuel Hidalgo (DOM)

=== Liga Sudamericana de Baloncesto Femenino ===
==== Group B ====
Pos	Team	Pld	W	L	PF	PA	PD	Pts	Qualification	OBR	AGU	CTP	PBC
1	(Argentina) Obras	3	3	0	235	156	+79	6	Advance to Final Four		76–48	78–56	81–52
2	(Uruguay) Aguada	3	2	1	197	209	−12	5	Advance to Final Four			72–66	
3	(Bolivia) Tenis La Paz	3	1	2	202	216	−14	4					76–66
4	(Colombia) Power	3	0	3	172	225	−53	3			58–73		

Source: FIBA
Rules for classification: 1) Points; 2) Head-to-head record; 4) Head-to-head point differential; 5) Head-to-head points scored; 6) Points difference; 7) Points scored.

==== Semi-finals ====
Team 1	Score	Team 2
Félix Pérez Cardozo (Paraguay)	74–81	(Uruguay) Aguada

==== Final ====
16 June 2024
16:00 UTC−4

Boxscore

Aguada (Uruguay)	69–87	(Brazil) SESI Araraquara
Scoring by quarter: 18–23, 10–23, 16–19, 25–22
Pts: Marín 28; Rebs: F. Fernández 10; Asts: Niski 3		Pts: De Oliveira 22; Rebs: Josefino 13; Asts: Débora 5

UENO COP Arena, Luque
Referees: Daniel García (VEN), Micaela Prado (ARG), Iván Huck (ARG)

=== Women's Basketball League Americas ===
==== Group A ====
Pos	Team	Pld	W	L	PF	PA	PD	Pts	Qualification	CUF	SSI	FCO	MAL
1	(Argentina) Unión Florida	3	3	0	199	160	+39	6	Final four		74–61		51–49
2	(Chile) Sportiva Italiana	3	2	1	203	189	+14	5	Final four				70–61
3	(Argentina) Ferro	3	1	2	184	218	−34	4		50–74	54–72		80–72
4	(Uruguay) Malvín	3	0	3	182	201	−19	3					

Source: FIBA
Rules for classification: 1) classification points; 2) head-to-head results; 3) head-to-head game points difference; 4) head-to-head number of game points scored.

== League Competitions (Men's) ==
League	Promoted to league ▲	Relegated from league ▼
Liga Uruguaya de Básquetbol	Urunday Universitario ▲; Welcome ▲	Larre Borges ▼; Goes ▼
Liga de Ascenso	Montevideo ▲; Bohemios ▲	Atenas ▼; Miramar ▼

=== Liga Uruguaya de Básquetbol ===
==== Regular season ====
Pos	Team	Pld	W	L	PF	PA	PD	Pts	Qualification
1	Nacional (C, O)	27	23	4	2495	2128	+367	50	Qualification to Basketball Champions League Americas (Note: Qualified as finalist.)
2	Aguada (Note: Aguada were deducted 2 points, due to incidents in game 4 of last season's final, against Peñarol.)	27	22	5	2434	2174	+260	47	Qualification to Basketball Champions League Americas
3	Malvín (Note: Although Malvín qualified for the Basketball Champions League Americas, refused to participate in the tournament.)	27	17	10	2169	2070	+99	44	Qualification to Play-offs
4	Peñarol (Note: Peñarol were deducted 2 points, due to incidents in game 4 of last season's final, against Aguada. In addition, 2 more points were deducted, due to incidents in the matchday 14, in the Clásico against Nacional.)	27	20	7	2269	2033	+236	43	Qualification to Play-offs
5	Defensor Sporting	27	12	15	2289	2213	+76	39	Qualification to Liga Sudamericana de Básquetbol (Note: Qualified as semifinalist.)
6	Cordón	27	11	16	2251	2335	−84	38	Qualification to Play-offs
7	Biguá	27	12	15	2326	2313	+13	39 (Note: Biguá 3–0 Hebraica y Macabi)	Qualification to Play-in
8	Hebraica y Macabi	27	12	15	2307	2361	−54	39	Qualification to Play-in
9	Urunday Universitario	27	11	16	2103	2219	−116	38	
10	Welcome (O)	27	8	19	2157	2529	−372	35 (Note: Being tied on points, the last relegation is decided in a playoff match)	Relegation play-off
11	Urupan (Note: Urupan was deducted 2 points, due to incidents in matchday 5 of the Reclasificatorio, against Hebraica y Macabi.) (R)	27	10	17	2214	2362	−148	35	Relegation play-off
12	Trouville (R)	26	4	22	1953	2230	−277	30	Relegation to Liga de Ascenso

Source: FUBB
Rules for classification: 1) Win–loss record; 2) Head–to–head record; 3) Head–to–head point difference; 4) Point difference; 5) Points scored; 6) Sum of quotients of points scored
(C) Champions; (O) Play-off winners; (R) Relegated

==== Play-offs ====
Play-in
8	Hebraica y Macabi	70	82	87	2
2O	Remeros	93	77	76	1
7	Biguá	103	88	2
1O	Ferro Carril	77	70	0

Quarter-finals
1	Nacional	94	115	96	3
8	Hebraica y Macabi	52	64	72	0
4	Peñarol	76	78	76	93	78	2
5	Defensor Sporting	71	73	95	96	84	3
2	Aguada	89	95	99	3
7	Biguá	77	90	82	0
3	Malvín	81	78	90	75	105	3
6	Cordón	88	63	75	79	76	2

Semi-finals
1	Nacional	97	77	90	85	3
5	Defensor Sporting	61	87	82	80	1
2	Aguada	96	83	93	83	111	3
3	Malvín	99	87	80	76	99	2

Finals
1	Nacional	102	75	73	72	103	97	79	4
2	Aguada	77	84	82	80	98	96	77	3

Source: FUBB

==== Finals ====
16 May 2025	Nacional	102–77 (Series: 1–0)	Aguada	Antel Arena, Montevideo
21:15 UTC−3	Scoring by quarter: 23–25, 26–13, 23–23, 30–16
	Pts: Semiglia 22; Rebs: Mãozinha 13; Asts: Three players 3	Boxscore	Pts: Sims 19; Rebs: Hassell 14; Asts: Santiso 7	Referees: Alejandro Sánchez Varela, Gonzalo Salgueiro, Vivian García

19 May 2025	Aguada	84–75 (Series: 1–1)	Nacional	Antel Arena, Montevideo
21:15 UTC−3	Scoring by quarter: 23–22, 21–12, 16–15, 24–26
	Pts: Sims 22; Rebs: Hassell, Wilson 10; Asts: Vidal 6	Boxscore	Pts: Semiglia 16; Rebs: Mãozinha 13; Asts: Three players 2	Attendance: 4,800; Referees: Andrés Laulhe, Diego Ortiz, Gastón Rodríguez

22 May 2025	Nacional	73–82 (Series: 1–2)	Aguada	Antel Arena, Montevideo
21:15 UTC−3	Scoring by quarter: 14–20, 25–25, 18–17, 16–20
	Pts: Smith 18; Rebs: Espíndola 9 Asts: Smith 4	Boxscore	Pts: Wilson 18; Rebs: Sims 9 Asts: Wilson 5	Referees: Andrés Bartel, Julio Dutra, Carlos Romero

25 May 2025	Aguada	80–72 (Series: 3–1)	Nacional	Antel Arena, Montevideo
21:15 UTC−3	Scoring by quarter: 13–22, 22–22, 21–18, 24–10
	Pts: Sims 23; Rebs: Hassell 12; Asts: Santiso, Sims 4	Boxscore	Pts: Oglivie 18; Rebs: Mãozinha 10; Asts: Smith 5	Referees: Alejandro Sánchez Varela, Andrés Laulhe, Gonzalo Salgueiro

27 May 2025	Nacional	103–98 (Series: 2–3)	Aguada	Antel Arena, Montevideo
21:15 UTC−3	Scoring by quarter: 33–21, 21–26, 24–20, 25–31
	Pts: Semiglia 19; Rebs: Oglivie, Espíndola 7 Asts: Espíndola 7	Boxscore	Pts: Sims 29; Rebs: Hassell 8 Asts: Vidal 7	Referees: Andrés Bartel, Alejandro Sánchez Varela, Julio Dutra

30 May 2025	Aguada	96–97 (Series: 3–3)	Nacional	Antel Arena, Montevideo
21:15 UTC−3	Scoring by quarter: 36–35, 24–18, 27–18, 9–26
	Pts: Sims 24; Rebs: Hassell 13; Asts: Vidal 9	Boxscore	Pts: Smith 30; Rebs: Espíndola 7 Asts: Smith 8	Referees: Andrés Bartel, Andrés Laulhe, Diego Ortiz

1 June 2025	Nacional	79–77 (Series: 4–3)	Aguada	Antel Arena, Montevideo
21:15 UTC−3	Scoring by quarter: 18–17, 22–16, 15–20, 24–24
	Pts: Smith 20; Rebs: Mãozinha 12; Asts: Six players 2	Boxscore	Pts: Wilson 28; Rebs: Wilson 11; Asts: Three players 2	Referees: Andrés Bartel, Alejandro Sánchez Varela, Gonzalo Salgueiro

=== Liga de Ascenso ===
==== Regular season ====
Pos	Team	Pld	W	L	PF	PA	PD	Pts	Qualification
1	Lagomar	28	17	11	2343	2133	+210	45 (Note: Lagomar 3–1, Olimpia 2–2, Goes 1–3)	Qualification to Play-offs
2	Olimpia (Note: Olimpia were deducted 2 points, due to incidents in game 3 of last season's promotion game, against Welcome. Also, 3 points more were deducted, due to incidents in their match on matchday 27, against Sayago.)	28	21	7	2464	2273	+191	45	Qualification to Play-offs
3	Goes (C, P, O)	28	17	11	2245	2182	+63	45	Qualification to Play-offs
4	Larrañaga	28	16	12	2390	2326	+64	44	Qualification to Play-offs
5	Unión Atlética (Note: Unión Atlética were deducted 2 points, due to incidents in game 1 of last season's quarter-finals game, against Urunday Universitario. Also, 3 points more were deducted, for a fight between fans in their match on matchday 10, against Sayago.) (P)	28	19	9	2073	1884	+189	42 (Note: Unión Atlética 5–1; Tabaré 3–3; Capitol 2–4, Stockolmo 2–4 (Capitol 2–0 Stockolmo))	Qualification to Play-offs
6	Tabaré	28	14	14	2202	2218	−16	42	Qualification to Play-offs
7	Capitol	28	14	14	2111	2183	−72	42	Qualification to Play-offs
8	Stockolmo	28	14	14	2134	2135	−1	42	Qualification to Play-offs
9	Colón	28	13	15	2128	2165	−37	41	
10	Verdirrojo (Note: Verdirrojo was deducted 1 point, for throwing a plastic bottle in game 1 of last season's play-out game, against Lagomar.)	28	12	16	2157	2278	−121	39 (Note: Verdirrojo 5–1, Larre Borges 4–2, Bohemios 2–4, Montevideo 1–5)	
11	Larre Borges	28	11	17	2135	2292	−157	39	
12	Bohemios	28	11	17	2239	2290	−51	39	
13	Montevideo	28	11	17	2318	2366	−48	39	
14	Sayago (Note: Sayago were deducted 3 points, for a fight between fans in their match on matchday 10, against Unión Atlética.) (R)	28	13	15	1976	2045	−69	38	Relegation to DTA
15	Olivol Mundial (R)	28	6	22	2180	2325	−145	34	Relegation to DTA

Source: FUBB
Rules for classification: 1) Win–loss record; 2) Head–to–head record; 3) Head–to–head point difference; 4) Point difference; 5) Points scored; 6) Sum of quotients of points scored
(C) Champions; (O) Play-off winners; (P) Promoted; (R) Relegated

==== Play-offs ====
Quarter-finals
1	Lagomar	75	66	0
8	Stockolmo	92	71	2
4	Larrañaga	63	60	0
5	Unión Atlética	89	74	2
2	Olimpia	70	85	65	1
7	Capitol	78	73	75	2
3	Goes	92	81	2
6	Tabaré	83	66	0

Semi-finals
8	Stockolmo	65	78	73	56	60	2
5	Unión Atlética	78	59	70	84	92	3
7	Capitol	85	70	72	0
3	Goes	90	93	99	3

Final
5	Unión Atlética	71
3	Goes	82

Source: FUBB

==== Final ====
22 October 2024
21:15 UTC−3

Report

Unión Atlética	71–82	Goes
Scoring by quarter: 23–17, 17–30, 16–22, 15–13
Pts: Okanu 21; Rebs: Trusich 10; Asts: Wohlwend 7		Pts: Talley 29; Rebs: Talley 12; Asts: Pereira 6

Palacio Contador Gastón Guelfi, Montevideo
Referees: Alejandro Sánchez Varela, Julio Dutra, Diego Ortiz

=== DTA ===
==== Regular season ====
Pos	Team	Pld	W	L	PF	PA	PD	Pts	Qualification
1	Marne (P)	20	18	2	1753	1415	+338	38	Qualification to Play-offs
2	Atenas (Note: Atenas was deducted 1 point, for incidents in Matchday 8, against Marne) (C, P, O)	20	18	2	1683	1329	+354	37	Qualification to Play-offs
3	Yale (P)	20	15	5	1627	1513	+114	35	Qualification to Play-offs
4	Albatros	20	12	8	1584	1522	+62	32	Qualification to Play-offs
5	Defensores de Maroñas	20	9	11	1438	1497	−59	29	Qualification to Play-offs
6	San Telmo Rápido Sport	20	8	12	1441	1511	−70	28	Qualification to Play-offs
7	Auriblanco	20	7	13	1454	1531	−77	27 (Note: Auriblanco 146–144 Capurro)	Qualification to Play-offs
8	Capurro (Note: Capurro were deducted 3 points, due to incidents in game 3 of last season's quarter-finals game, against Deportivo Paysandú)	20	10	10	1552	1539	+13	27	Qualification to Play-offs
9	Juventud	20	6	14	1480	1634	−154	26	
10	Danubio	20	3	17	1366	1649	−283	23	
11	Ateneo (Note: Ateneo were deducted 3 points, due to incidents in game 3 of last season's quarter-finals game, against Bohemios)	20	4	16	1461	1699	−238	21	

Source: FUBB
Rules for classification: 1) Win–loss record; 2) Head–to–head record; 3) Head–to–head point difference; 4) Point difference; 5) Points scored; 6) Sum of quotients of points scored
(C) Champions; (O) Play-off winners; (P) Promoted

==== Play-offs ====
Quarter-finals
1	Marne	88	82	2
8	Capurro	79	67	0
4	Albatros	91	82	2
5	Defensores de Maroñas	86	75	0
2	Atenas	81	68	71	2
7	Auriblanco	59	73	62	1
3	Yale	75	65	2
6	San Telmo Rápido Sport	59	61	0

Semi-finals
1	Marne	73	68	2
4	Albatros	62	66	0
2	Atenas	79	85	2
3	Yale	63	60	0

Final
1	Marne	81
2	Atenas	90
Promotion play-off
4	Albatros	67	69	0
3	Yale	71	76	2

Source: FUBB

==== Final ====
18 September 2024
21:00 UTC−3

Report

Marne	81–90	Atenas
Scoring by quarter: 25–18, 19–23, 18–29, 19–20
Pts: Nicoletti 24; Rebs: Sacco 12; Asts: Nicoletti 6		Pts: Danridge 20; Rebs: Three players 7 Asts: Pose 7

Estadio Romeo Schinca, Montevideo
Referees: Alejandro Nadruz, Pablo Premazzi, Emanuel Silveira

== League Competitions (Women's) ==
=== Liga Femenina de Básquetbol ===
==== Regular season ====
Pos	Team	Pld	W	L	PF	PA	PD	Pts	Qualification
1	Malvín	10	8	2	730	615	+115	18 (Note: Malvín 2–2, +8; Aguada 2–2, +1; Yale 2–2 –9)	Qualification to Copa de Oro
2	Aguada	10	8	2	728	624	+104	18	Qualification to Copa de Oro
3	Yale	10	8	2	765	656	+109	18	Qualification to Copa de Oro
4	Defensor Sporting (C, O)	10	4	6	721	675	+46	14	Qualification to Copa de Oro
5	Remeros	10	2	8	567	690	−123	12	Qualification to Copa de Plata
6	Urunday Universitario	10	0	10	531	782	−251	10	Qualification to Copa de Plata
7	Juventud (O)	8	7	1	547	428	+119	15	Qualification to Copa de Plata
8	Lagomar	8	6	2	553	408	+145	14	Qualification to Copa de Plata
9	25 de Agosto	8	5	3	553	389	+164	13	
10	Tabaré	8	2	6	434	499	−65	10	
11	Hebraica y Macabi	8	0	8	278	641	−363	8	

Source: FUBB
Rules for classification: 1) Win–loss record; 2) Head–to–head record; 3) Head–to–head point difference; 4) Point difference; 5) Points scored; 6) Sum of quotients of points scored
(C) Champions; (O) Play-off winners

==== Play-offs ====
Semi-finals	Finals
1	Malvín	61	59	0
4	Defensor Sporting	66	75	2
4	Defensor Sporting	66	65	59	3
3	Yale	62	51	50	0
2	Aguada	67	80	0
3	Yale	70	83	2

Source: FUBB

==== Finals ====
18 October 2024	Yale	62–66 (Series: 0–1)	Defensor Sporting	Campo de Deportes Luis Ruocco, Montevideo
19:15 UTC−3	Scoring by quarter: 13–16, 16–24, 20–8, 13–18
	Pts: Bazán 22; Rebs: Barbato, Bazán 10; Asts: Sienra 10	Boxscore	Pts: Campos 26; Rebs: Three players 8 Asts: Campos 5	Referees: Carlos Romero, Mauricio Correa, Sebastián Díaz

25 October 2024	Defensor Sporting	65–51 (Series: 2–0)	Yale	Gimnasio Óscar Magurno, Montevideo
19:00 UTC−3	Scoring by quarter: 22–8, 9–16, 17–12, 17–15
	Pts: Campos 17; Rebs: J. Rivera 14; Asts: Schiavo 5	Boxscore	Pts: Bazán 22; Rebs: Barbato 12; Asts: Sienra 8	Attendance: 500; Referees: Aline García, Pablo Graiño, Erik Cedrés

30 October 2024	Yale	50–59 (Series: 0–3)	Defensor Sporting	Estadio Romeo Schinca, Montevideo
19:00 UTC−3	Scoring by quarter: 23–18, 8–8, 10–21, 9–12
	Pts: Fernández 23; Rebs: Bazán 19; Asts: Bazán 6	Boxscore	Pts: Campos 20; Rebs: J. Rivera 10; Asts: Campos, J. Rivera 3	Referees: Julio Dutra, Andrés Bustelo, Gino Saraiva

==== Copa de Plata ====
Semi-finals
5S1	Remeros	76	66	70	2
2S2	Lagomar	60	79	64	1
6S1	Urunday Universitario	52	59	0
1S2	Juventud	69	71	2

Finals
5S1	Remeros	70	51	67	1
1S2	Juventud	52	61	72	2

Source: FUBB

===== Finals =====
19 October 2024	Remeros	70–52 (Series: 1–0)	Juventud	Gimnasio Agrimensor Mario Eduardo Bellini, Mercedes
19:00 UTC−3	Scoring by quarter: 21–15, 24–14, 13–16, 12–7
	Pts: Lauber 22; Rebs: Bacchini 19; Asts: Bacchini 11	Boxscore	Pts: Spinelli 16; Rebs: Lapteva 12; Asts: Díaz 3	Attendance: 100; Referees: Martín Rial, Germán Barrios

25 October 2024	Juventud	61–51 (Series: 1–1)	Remeros	Estadio Federal Cirilio Malnatti, Las Piedras
21:30 UTC−3	Scoring by quarter: 19–17, 20–12, 15–11, 7–11
	Pts: Spinelli 25; Rebs: Hernández 13; Asts: Juárez 6	Boxscore	Pts: Lauber 12; Rebs: Bacchini 11; Asts: Zapata 4	Referees: Mauricio Correa, Máximo Sarli

2 November 2024	Remeros	67–72 (Series: 1–2)	Juventud	Estadio Néstor "Chubi" Navilat, Nueva Helvecia
19:00 UTC−3	Scoring by quarter: 20–17, 15–13, 12–22, 20–20
	Pts: Álvarez 17; Rebs: Bacchini 13; Asts: Bacchini, Laubert 6	Boxscore	Pts: Spinelli 33; Rebs: Díaz, Lapteva 8 Asts: Juárez 5	Referees: Diego Ortiz, Valentina Benítez

== Cup Competitions (Men's) ==
=== Torneo Litoral Norte ===
Semi-finals	Final
1S	Ferro Carril	71	100	2
2P	Touring	67	95	0
1S	Ferro Carril	85
1P	Pelotaris	67
1P	Pelotaris	66	91	2
2S	Universitario	59	69	0	Third place match
2P	Touring	81
2S	Universitario	54

Source: FUBB

==== Final ====
7 March 2025
21:45 UTC−3

Report

Ferro Carril	85–67	Pelotaris
Scoring by quarter: 22–19, 30–16, 17–15, 16–17
Pts: Giano 20; Rebs: Barnes, De León 9 Asts: Giano, Williams 3		Pts: Three players 12; Rebs: Delgado 8 Asts: Rodríguez 5

Estadio 8 de Junio, Paysandú
Referees: Vivian García, Emerson Troche y Aline García

=== OBL ===
Pos	Team	Pld	W	L	PF	PA	PD	Pts	Qualification or relegation
1	Ferro Carril (C, O)	3	3	0	130	85	+45	6	Qualification to Final Four
2	Remeros	3	2	1	202	183	+19	5	Qualification to Final Four
3	Pelotaris	3	2	1	86	82	+4	5	Qualification to Final Four
4	Touring	4	1	3	113	137	−24	5	Qualification to Final Four
5	Pacaembú Biguá	3	0	3	62	106	−44	3	

Source: FUBB
Rules for classification: 1) Win–loss record; 2) Head–to–head record; 3) Head–to–head point difference; 4) Point difference; 5) Points scored; 6) Sum of quotients of points scored
(C) Champions; (O) Play-off winners

==== Final Four ====
Semi-finals
1	Ferro Carril	72
4	Touring	62
2	Remeros	67
3	Pelotaris	65

Final
1	Ferro Carril	88
2	Remeros	69

Source: FUBB

==== Final ====
23 March 2025
21:15 UTC−3

Report

Ferro Carril	88–69	Remeros
Scoring by quarter: 22–16, 21–8, 22–19, 23–26
Pts: Williams, Barnes 17; Rebs: Barnes, De León 9 Asts: Giano 6		Pts: Oyenard 24; Rebs: Oyenard 10; Asts: Brun 6

Estadio 8 de Junio, Paysandú
Referees: Julio Dutra, Valentina Dorrego, Álvaro Labiuza
