= 2027 FIBA U16 AmeriCup (South American qualifiers) =

International youth basketball tournament

FIBA Under-16 Americas Basketball Championship

Tournament details
- Host country: Chile
- City: Castro
- Dates: 21–25 October 2026
- Teams: 5 (from 1 sub-confederation)
- Venue: 1 (in 1 host city)

Final positions
- Champions: Paraguay (1st title)
- Runners-up: Venezuela
- Third place: Chile

Tournament statistics
- Games played: 10

Official website
- www.fiba.basketball

The South American leg of the 2027 FIBA U16 AmeriCup qualifiers marked the first edition of this competition. The South American qualifiers replaced the FIBA U15 South American Championship and, unlike the previous format, they do not include the top South American teams. Therefore, Argentina and Brazil did not participate in this tournament, having already secured direct qualification for the 2027 FIBA U16 AmeriCup based on the historical ranking.

The tournament was played at Gimnasio Municipal in Castro, Chile, from 21 to 25 October 2026. In this tournament, U15 national teams competed to qualify for next year's FIBA U16 AmeriCup, with the winning team qualifying directly, while the second berth may be awarded depending on the designation of the host nation for the continental tournament, which will be announced at a later date.

Paraguay won the tournament and qualified for the 2027 FIBA U16 AmeriCup.

== Participating teams ==
- Chile
- Ecuador
- Paraguay
- Uruguay
- Venezuela

== Tournament format ==
All teams played a round-robin tournament in a single group. The final standings of the group also determined the final standings of the tournament.

== Final standings ==
Pos	Team	Pld	W	L	PF	PA	PD	Pts	Qualification
1st place, gold medalist(s)	Paraguay	4	3	1	263	273	−10	7	2027 FIBA U16 AmeriCup
2nd place, silver medalist(s)	Venezuela	4	3	1	237	224	+13	7	Possible 2027 FIBA U16 AmeriCup
3rd place, bronze medalist(s)	Chile (H)	4	2	2	275	261	+14	6	
4	Uruguay	4	2	2	305	273	+32	6	
5	Ecuador	4	0	4	240	289	−49	4	

Source: FIBA
(H) Hosts

== Match results ==
All times are local (Chile Summer Time; UTC−3).

21 October 2026
17:30

Boxscore

Venezuela	60–62	Paraguay
Scoring by quarter: 15–12, 17–16, 17–11, 11–23

Gimnasio Municipal de Castro

21 October 2026
20:00

Boxscore

Chile	69–62	Ecuador
Scoring by quarter: 13–24, 24–11, 16–10, 16–17

Gimnasio Municipal de Castro

22 October 2026
17:30

Boxscore

Uruguay	96–71	Ecuador
Scoring by quarter: 24–20, 23–16, 27–17, 22–18

Gimnasio Municipal de Castro

22 October 2026
20:00

Boxscore

Venezuela	62–58	Chile
Scoring by quarter: 13–7, 17–11, 19–21, 13–19

Gimnasio Municipal de Castro

23 October 2026
17:30

Boxscore

Paraguay	58–83	Uruguay
Scoring by quarter: 16–20, 10–22, 14–14, 18–27

Gimnasio Municipal de Castro

23 October 2026
20:00

Boxscore

Ecuador	44–52	Venezuela
Scoring by quarter: 17–15, 12–8, 10–14, 5–15

Gimnasio Municipal de Castro

24 October 2026
17:30

Boxscore

Ecuador	63–72	Paraguay
Scoring by quarter: 23–13, 18–22, 11–20, 11–17

Gimnasio Municipal de Castro

24 October 2026
20:00

Boxscore

Chile	81–66	Uruguay
Scoring by quarter: 17–14, 20–25, 19–15, 25–12

Gimnasio Municipal de Castro

25 October 2026
17:30

Boxscore

Uruguay	60–63	Venezuela
Scoring by quarter: 16–12, 14–21, 12–11, 18–19

Gimnasio Municipal de Castro

25 October 2026
20:00

Boxscore

Paraguay	71–67	Chile
Scoring by quarter: 21–11, 21–16, 18–20, 11–20

Gimnasio Municipal de Castro
