= Pasaje Canton =

- Canton
- Nickname: "Pasaje de las nieves"
- Location of El Oro Province in Ecuador.

- Pasaje Canton in El Oro Province
- Coordinates: 3.3269°S 79.8049°W
- Country: Ecuador
- Province: El Oro Province
- Capital: Pasaje

Area
  - Total: 456.1 km^{2} (176.1 sq mi)

Population (2022 census)
  - Total: 83,597
  - Density: 183.3/km^{2} (474.7/sq mi)
- Time zone: UTC-5 (ECT)

Pasaje Canton is a canton of Ecuador, located in the El Oro Province, in the coastal region. Its capital is the town of Pasaje, where much of its population lies. Its population at the 2001 census was 62,959.

== History ==
In the year 1758, the Governor of Machala, the indigenous Ambrosio Gomal, with a group of indigenous people, negotiated with the government of Guayaquil in defense of the site of Pasaje against the onslaught of land auctioneers. The land judge at that time, Captain Antonio de Argote, ceded the land to the indigenous people from Machala on the condition that in two and a half years, they would make it a town, otherwise the land would be returned to his Majesty the king of Spain.

The first settlers established themselves in what is now Guaboplaya and Mollopongo, down the river from current-day Pasaje. It is known that there was a path that descended from the highlands and arrived at the “Chaguana” ranch, and onto this main path connected a road originating in Pucará, which passed through land belonging to el señor Núñez and an area called Las Nieves, which is where the name “Pasaje de las Nieves” comes from.

This first settlement was founded around 1760, but they were faced with harsh weather and had difficulty connecting to Machala due to the constant rising of the Jubones River —in Quechua, “devourer of men”— so they were forced to move to another place. They settled in Uzhcaplaya, on the opposite bank of the river, around 1780, and stayed until 1800 when approximately 100 residents, despite the ease of work, were tired of the unexpected scourges of the tumultuous river and turned to a new settlement in what is now Pasaje Cantón. So the story was told in 1822 when Mr. Gabino Serrano, great grandfather of Andrés Corsino García, the first mayor of Pasaje Canton, had the fortune of lodging the Marshal Antonio José de Sucre in his house as he advanced with the liberating troops, who sealed the independence of the country in the Victory of Pichincha on May 24 of the same year.

With the law of territorial division in 1824, Machala was declared a cantón, making Pasaje a parish of Machala. Pasaje grew rapidly with the immigration of people from Cuenca, Loja and Zaruma, attracted by the fertility of its land and notable progress.

In 1890, the idea of independence from Machala began to germinate, with the goal of political and economic liberty through cantonization. The president of Ecuador, Dr. Luis Cordero, had denied Pasaje the designation of cantón out of resentment for its lack of support in the elections that made him president. The priest Dr. José Ochoa León, the deputy for El Oro Province in that year, and a close friend of President Cordero, was the one who finally made possible the cantonization of Pasaje in 1894.

== Territorial Organization ==
The city and canton of Pasaje, like other Ecuadorian localities, is governed by a municipality as stipulated in the National Political Constitution. The Municipality of Pasaje is a sectional government entity that governs the canton autonomously from the central government. The municipality is organized by a separation of powers with the executive component represented by the mayor, and the legislative component formed by the members of the cantonal council. The mayor is the highest administrative and political authority of Pasaje Canton. They are the head of the city council and representative of the Municipality.

The Canton is divided into parishes, whether urban or rural, which are represented by the Parish Boards before the Municipality of Pasaje.

Urban Parishes

- Ochoa León
- Bolívar
- Loma de Franco
- Tres Cerritos

Rural Perishes

- Buenavista
- Cañaquemada
- La Peaña
- Uzhcurrumi
- El Progreso
- Casacay

== Demographics ==
Ethnic groups as of the Ecuadorian census of 2010:

- Mestizo 85.5%
- White 8.1%
- Afro-Ecuadorian 4.8%
- Montubio 1.1%
- Indigenous 0.3%
- Other 0.2%
