= Peru men's national under-15 basketball team =

Peru
- FIBA zone: FIBA Americas
- National federation: Peru Basketball Federation

U17 World Cup
- Appearances: None

U16 AmeriCup
- Appearances: None

U15 South American Championship
- Appearances: 11–22 (Note: Data from 1984, 1985, 1986, 1987, 1988, 1989, 1991, 1993, 1998, 1999 and 2000 championships are not available)
- Medals: None

The Peru men's national under-15 basketball team is a national basketball team of Peru, administered by the Peru Basketball Federation (Spanish: Federación Deportiva Peruana de Basketball) (F.D.P.B.). It represents the country in international under-15 basketball competitions.

== FIBA South America Under-15 Championship for Men participations ==
Year	Result
1995	4th
1996	5th
1997	8th
2002	10th
2005	7th
2007	8th

Year	Result
2008	5th
2010	8th
2012	8th
2014	6th
2016	8th

== See also ==
- Peru men's national basketball team
- Peru men's national under-17 basketball team
- Peru women's national under-15 basketball team
