= FIBA U15 South American Championship =

International youth basketball tournament

- Current season, competition or edition: 2024 FIBA U15 South American Championship
- Formerly: FIBA South American Championship for Cadets; FIBA South America Under-15 Championship for Men
- Sport: Basketball
- Founded: 1984; 42 years ago
- Organizing body: FIBA Americas
- No. of teams: 10 max.
- Continent: South America
- Most recent champion: Venezuela (4th title)
- Most titles: Argentina (16 titles)
- Qualification: FIBA Under-16 AmeriCup
- Related competitions: FIBA U17 South American Championship
- Website: www.fiba.basketball/history

The FIBA U15 South American Championship is a basketball tournament held about every two years among the ten countries of South America and is organized in part by FIBA Americas. The tournament serves as a gateway to the FIBA Under-16 AmeriCup. Originally, this competition was played in the under-16 age category, and since 2008 it has been played in the under-15 age category.

== Summary ==
Year	Host	Gold	Silver	Bronze
1984	Brazil (Porto Alegre)	Brazil	Argentina	Uruguay
1985	Peru (Piura)	Brazil	Venezuela	Argentina
1986	Venezuela (Caracas)	Venezuela	Brazil	Chile
1987	Colombia (Cúcuta)	Argentina	Brazil	Venezuela
1988	Paraguay (Encarnación)	Argentina	Brazil	Uruguay
1989	Brazil (Brasília)	Argentina	Brazil	Uruguay
1991	Paraguay (Pedro Juan Caballero)	Brazil	Argentina	Uruguay
1993	Brazil (Itanhaém)	Argentina	Brazil	Venezuela
1995	Peru (Arequipa)	Argentina	Brazil	Venezuela
1996	Argentina (Córdoba)	Brazil	Argentina	Uruguay
1997	Argentina (Santa Fe)	Brazil	Paraguay	Argentina
1998	Venezuela (Guanare)	Venezuela	Argentina	Paraguay
1999	Chile (Ancud)	Argentina	Brazil	Paraguay
2000	Colombia (Bogotá)	Argentina	Uruguay	Paraguay
2002	Ecuador (Cuenca)	Brazil	Argentina	Venezuela
2003	Colombia (Cúcuta)	Venezuela	Brazil	Colombia
2004	Argentina (Catamarca)	Argentina	Uruguay	Brazil
2005	Uruguay (Piriápolis)	Argentina	Uruguay	Brazil
2006	Uruguay (Montevideo)	Brazil	Argentina	Uruguay
2007	Argentina (Posadas)	Argentina	Venezuela	Brazil
2008	Venezuela (Guanare)	Argentina	Venezuela	Brazil
2009	Colombia (San Andrés)	Argentina	Brazil	Uruguay
2010	Colombia (Pasto)	Argentina	Brazil	Chile
2011	Paraguay (Asunción)	Argentina	Brazil	Uruguay
2012	Uruguay (Maldonado)	Argentina	Uruguay	Chile
2014	Venezuela (Barquisimeto)	Brazil	Argentina	Venezuela
2016	Paraguay (Asunción)	Argentina	Paraguay	Venezuela
2018	Uruguay (Montevideo)	Brazil	Uruguay	Argentina
2022	Argentina (Buenos Aires)	Brazil	Argentina	Uruguay
2024	Ecuador (Pasaje)	Venezuela	Brazil	Argentina

== Medal table ==
Rank	Nation	Gold	Silver	Bronze	Total
1	Argentina	16	8	4	28
2	Brazil	10	12	4	26
3	Venezuela	4	3	6	13
4	Uruguay	0	5	9	14
5	Paraguay	0	2	3	5
6	Chile	0	0	3	3
7	Colombia	0	0	1	1
Totals (7 entries)		30	30	30	90

== Participation details ==
Team	(Brazil); 1984	(Peru); 1985	(Venezuela); 1986	(Colombia); 1987	(Paraguay); 1988	(Brazil); 1989	(Paraguay); 1991	(Brazil); 1993	(Peru); 1995	(Argentina); 1996	(Argentina); 1997	(Venezuela); 1998	(Chile); 1999	(Colombia); 2000	(Ecuador); 2002	(Colombia); 2003	(Argentina); 2004	(Uruguay); 2005	(Uruguay); 2006	(Argentina); 2007	(Venezuela); 2008	(Colombia); 2009	(Colombia); 2010	(Paraguay); 2011	(Uruguay); 2012	(Venezuela); 2014	(Paraguay); 2016	(Uruguay); 2018	(Argentina); 2022	(Ecuador); 2024
Argentina	2nd	3rd	4th	1st	1st	1st	2nd	1st	1st	2nd	3rd	2nd	1st	1st	2nd	4th	1st	1st	2nd	1st	1st	1st	1st	1st	1st	2nd	1st	3rd	2nd	3rd
Bolivia	?	?	?	?	?	?	?	?	—	—	10th	?	?	?	9th	—	8th	8th	—	10th	—	—	—	8th	—	—	—	—	8th	9th
Brazil	1st	1st	2nd	2nd	2nd	2nd	1st	2nd	2nd	1st	1st	?	2nd	—	1st	2nd	3rd	3rd	1st	3rd	3rd	2nd	2nd	2nd	4th	1st	—	1st	1st	2nd
Chile	?	?	3rd	?	?	?	?	?	6th	6th	6th	?	?	?	5th	7th	6th	5th	5th	5th	—	6th	3rd	7th	3rd	4th	6th	5th	7th	5th
Colombia	?	?	?	?	?	?	?	?	—	—	5th	?	?	?	4th	3rd	4th	—	—	7th	—	5th	6th	5th	6th	8th	5th	8th	5th	8th
Ecuador	?	?	?	?	?	?	?	?	—	7th	9th	?	?	?	8th	—	—	9th	—	9th	—	7th	7th	—	—	7th	7th	7th	6th	4th
Paraguay	?	?	?	?	?	?	?	?	—	4th	2nd	3rd	3rd	3rd	7th	6th	7th	6th	6th	6th	—	4th	—	6th	7th	—	2nd	6th	4th	7th
Peru	?	?	?	?	?	?	?	?	4th	5th	8th	?	?	?	10th	—	—	7th	—	8th	5th	—	8th	—	8th	6th	8th	—	—	—
Uruguay	3rd	?	?	?	3rd	3rd	3rd	?	5th	3rd	7th	?	?	2nd	6th	5th	2nd	2nd	3rd	4th	4th	3rd	5th	3rd	2nd	5th	4th	2nd	3rd	6th
Venezuela	?	2nd	1st	3rd	?	?	?	3rd	3rd	—	4th	1st	?	?	3rd	1st	5th	4th	4th	2nd	2nd	—	4th	4th	5th	3rd	3rd	4th	—	1st

== See also ==
- FIBA U17 South American Championship
- FIBA U15 Women's South American Championship
- FIBA U17 Women's South American Championship
- FIBA South America Under-21 Championship for Men (defunct)
