= Bolivia men's national under-15 basketball team =

Bolivia
- FIBA zone: FIBA Americas
- National federation: Federación Boliviana de Básquetbol

U17 World Cup
- Appearances: None

U16 AmeriCup
- Appearances: None

U15 South American Championship
- Appearances: 8–19 (Note: Data from 1984, 1985, 1986, 1987, 1988, 1989, 1991, 1993, 1998, 1999 and 2000 championships are not available)
- Medals: None

The Bolivia men's national under-15 basketball team is a national basketball team of Bolivia, administered by the Federación Boliviana de Básquetbol (FBB). It represents the country in international men's under-15 basketball competitions.

== FIBA South America Under-15 Championship for Men participations ==
Year	Result
1997	10th
2002	9th
2004	8th
2005	8th
2007	10th
2011	8th
2022	8th
2024	9th

== See also ==
- Bolivia men's national basketball team
- Bolivia men's national under-17 basketball team
- Bolivia women's national under-15 basketball team
