= 2022 FIBA U15 South American Championship =

International basketball competition

Tournament details
- Host country: Argentina
- City: Buenos Aires
- Dates: 16–20 November 2022
- Teams: 8 (from 1 confederation)
- Venue: 1 (in 1 host city)

Final positions
- Champions: Brazil (10th title)
- Runners-up: Argentina
- Third place: Uruguay

Official website
- www.fiba.basketball

The 2022 FIBA U15 South American Championship was the 29th edition of the South American basketball championship for under-15 men's national teams. The tournament was played at Estadio Obras Sanitarias in Buenos Aires, Argentina, from 16 to 20 November 2022.

== Participating teams ==
- Argentina
- Bolivia
- Brazil
- Chile
- Colombia
- Ecuador
- Paraguay
- Uruguay

== First round ==
In the first round, the teams were drawn into two groups of four. The first two teams from each group advanced to the semifinals; the third and fourth teams advanced to the 5th–8th place playoffs.

All times are local (Argentina Time – UTC-3).

=== Group A ===
Pos	Team	Pld	W	L	PF	PA	PD	Pts	Qualification
1	Brazil	3	3	0	276	164	+112	6	Semifinals
2	Paraguay	3	1	2	162	199	−37	4	Semifinals
3	Colombia	3	1	2	151	196	−45	4	5th–8th place playoffs
4	Chile	3	1	2	163	193	−30	4	5th–8th place playoffs

Source: FIBA

16 November 2022
15:00

Boxscore

Chile	51–50	Paraguay
Scoring by quarter: 9–12, 13–14, 14–14, 15–10

Estadio Obras Sanitarias, Buenos Aires

16 November 2022
18:00

Boxscore

Brazil	89–47	Colombia
Scoring by quarter: 21–14, 16–8, 25–6, 27–19

Estadio Obras Sanitarias, Buenos Aires

17 November 2022
12:00

Boxscore

Colombia	56–52	Chile
Scoring by quarter: 13–8, 15–10, 11–14, 17–20

Estadio Obras Sanitarias, Buenos Aires

17 November 2022
17:30

Boxscore

Paraguay	57–100	Brazil
Scoring by quarter: 18–19, 10–16, 16–30, 13–35

Estadio Obras Sanitarias, Buenos Aires

18 November 2022
12:00

Boxscore

Paraguay	55–48	Colombia
Scoring by quarter: 15–12, 15–6, 15–16, 10–14

Estadio Obras Sanitarias, Buenos Aires

18 November 2022
17:30

Boxscore

Brazil	87–60	Chile
Scoring by quarter: 27–11, 24–15, 18–20, 18–14

Estadio Obras Sanitarias, Buenos Aires

=== Group B ===
Pos	Team	Pld	W	L	PF	PA	PD	Pts	Qualification
1	Argentina	3	3	0	278	114	+164	6	Semifinals
2	Uruguay	3	2	1	212	156	+56	5	Semifinals
3	Ecuador	3	1	2	126	206	−80	4	5th–8th place playoffs
4	Bolivia	3	0	3	120	260	−140	3	5th–8th place playoffs

Source: FIBA

16 November 2022
12:30

Boxscore

Uruguay	82–36	Ecuador
Scoring by quarter: 21–14, 20–4, 14–9, 27–9

Estadio Obras Sanitarias, Buenos Aires

16 November 2022
20:30

Boxscore

Argentina	111–43	Bolivia
Scoring by quarter: 25–12, 36–12, 28–11, 22–8

Estadio Obras Sanitarias, Buenos Aires

17 November 2022
14:30

Boxscore

Bolivia	32–90	Uruguay
Scoring by quarter: 11–21, 4–32, 2–17, 15–20

Estadio Obras Sanitarias, Buenos Aires

17 November 2022
20:00

Boxscore

Ecuador	31–79	Argentina
Scoring by quarter: 5–25, 12–16, 1–24, 13–14

Estadio Obras Sanitarias, Buenos Aires

18 November 2022
14:30

Boxscore

Bolivia	45–59	Ecuador
Scoring by quarter: 7–11, 12–8, 11–14, 15–26

Estadio Obras Sanitarias, Buenos Aires

18 November 2022
20:00

Boxscore

Argentina	88–40	Uruguay
Scoring by quarter: 26–10, 20–13, 21–5, 21–12

Estadio Obras Sanitarias, Buenos Aires

== 5th–8th place playoffs ==
5th–8th place semifinals
A3	Colombia	90
B4	Bolivia	54
B3	Ecuador	44
A4	Chile	38

5th place match
A3	Colombia	79
B3	Ecuador	65
7th place match
B4	Bolivia	45
A4	Chile	68

=== 5th–8th place semifinals ===
19 November 2022
12:30

Boxscore

Colombia	90–54	Bolivia
Scoring by quarter: 24–8, 27–17, 20–15, 19–14

Estadio Obras Sanitarias, Buenos Aires

19 November 2022
15:00

Boxscore

Ecuador	44–38	Chile
Scoring by quarter: 10–15, 12–4, 13–15, 9–4

Estadio Obras Sanitarias, Buenos Aires

=== 7th place match ===
20 November 2022
12:30

Boxscore

Bolivia	45–68	Chile
Scoring by quarter: 13–16, 14–13, 7–19, 11–20

Estadio Obras Sanitarias, Buenos Aires

=== 5th place match ===
20 November 2022
15:00

Boxscore

Colombia	79–65	Ecuador
Scoring by quarter: 22–10, 23–21, 14–15, 20–19

Estadio Obras Sanitarias, Buenos Aires

== Championship playoffs ==
Semifinals
A1	Brazil	80
B2	Uruguay	40
B1	Argentina	96
A2	Paraguay	54

Final
A1	Brazil	72
B1	Argentina	67
3rd place match
B2	Uruguay	67
A2	Paraguay	42

=== Semifinals ===
19 November 2022
18:00

Boxscore

Brazil	80–40	Uruguay
Scoring by quarter: 17–13, 17–7, 21–11, 25–9

Estadio Obras Sanitarias, Buenos Aires

19 November 2022
20:30

Boxscore

Argentina	96–54	Paraguay
Scoring by quarter: 27–10, 24–17, 21–12, 24–15

Estadio Obras Sanitarias, Buenos Aires

=== 3rd place match ===
20 November 2022
18:00

Boxscore

Uruguay	67–42	Paraguay
Scoring by quarter: 19–10, 11–3, 13–13, 24–16

Estadio Obras Sanitarias, Buenos Aires

=== Final ===
20 November 2022
20:30

Boxscore

Brazil	72–67	Argentina
Scoring by quarter: 15–20, 23–20, 14–13, 20–14

Estadio Obras Sanitarias, Buenos Aires

== Final standings ==
Rank	Team
1st place, gold medalist(s)	Brazil
2nd place, silver medalist(s)	Argentina
3rd place, bronze medalist(s)	Uruguay
4	Paraguay
5	Colombia
6	Ecuador
7	Chile
8	Bolivia

Qualified for the 2023 FIBA Under-16 Americas Championship
