= 2018 FIBA U15 South American Championship =

International basketball competition

Tournament details
- Host country: Uruguay
- City: Montevideo
- Dates: 6–11 November 2018
- Teams: 8 (from 1 confederation)
- Venue: 1 (in 1 host city)

Final positions
- Champions: Brazil (9th title)
- Runners-up: Uruguay
- Third place: Argentina

Official website
- www.fiba.basketball

The 2018 FIBA U15 South American Championship was the 28th edition of the South American basketball championship for under-15 men's national teams. The tournament was played at Estadio Club Atlético Atenas in Montevideo, Uruguay, from 6 to 11 November 2018.

== Participating teams ==
- Argentina
- Brazil
- Chile
- Colombia
- Ecuador
- Paraguay
- Uruguay
- Venezuela

== First round ==
In the first round, the teams were drawn into two groups of four. The first two teams from each group advanced to the semifinals; the third and fourth teams advanced to the 5th–8th place playoffs.

All times are local (Uruguay Time – UTC-3).

=== Group A ===
Pos	Team	Pld	W	L	PF	PA	PD	Pts	Qualification
1	Argentina	3	3	0	236	173	+63	6	Semifinals
2	Venezuela	3	2	1	201	198	+3	5	Semifinals
3	Chile	3	1	2	209	193	+16	4	5th–8th place playoffs
4	Colombia	3	0	3	147	229	−82	3	5th–8th place playoffs

Source: FIBA

6 November 2018
14:15

Boxscore

Chile	64–72	Argentina
Scoring by quarter: 16–14, 11–20, 14–19, 23–19

Estadio Club Atlético Atenas, Montevideo

6 November 2018
18:45

Boxscore

Venezuela	64–54	Colombia
Scoring by quarter: 14–16, 20–6, 16–14, 14–18

Estadio Club Atlético Atenas, Montevideo

7 November 2018
14:15

Boxscore

Colombia	45–88	Chile
Scoring by quarter: 8–23, 17–21, 8–25, 12–19

Estadio Club Atlético Atenas, Montevideo

7 November 2018
18:45

Boxscore

Argentina	87–61	Venezuela
Scoring by quarter: 19–13, 29–10, 24–18, 15–20

Estadio Club Atlético Atenas, Montevideo

8 November 2018
14:15

Boxscore

Colombia	48–77	Argentina
Scoring by quarter: 7–18, 6–21, 13–23, 22–15

Estadio Club Atlético Atenas, Montevideo

8 November 2018
16:30

Boxscore

Chile	57–76	Venezuela
Scoring by quarter: 14–10, 7–15, 13–32, 23–19

Estadio Club Atlético Atenas, Montevideo

=== Group B ===
Pos	Team	Pld	W	L	PF	PA	PD	Pts	Qualification
1	Uruguay	3	3	0	216	135	+81	6	Semifinals
2	Brazil	3	2	1	235	167	+68	5	Semifinals
3	Paraguay	3	1	2	145	214	−69	4	5th–8th place playoffs
4	Ecuador	3	0	3	149	229	−80	3	5th–8th place playoffs

Source: FIBA

6 November 2018
16:30

Boxscore

Brazil	85–45	Paraguay
Scoring by quarter: 26–10, 17–11, 20–11, 22–13

Estadio Club Atlético Atenas, Montevideo

6 November 2018
21:00

Boxscore

Uruguay	81–33	Ecuador
Scoring by quarter: 24–7, 25–5, 23–12, 9–9

Estadio Club Atlético Atenas, Montevideo

7 November 2018
16:30

Boxscore

Ecuador	60–61	Paraguay
Scoring by quarter: 13–19, 16–16, 18–11, 13–15

Estadio Club Atlético Atenas, Montevideo

7 November 2018
21:00

Boxscore

Uruguay	66–63	Brazil
Scoring by quarter: 17–20, 14–12, 15–15, 20–16

Estadio Club Atlético Atenas, Montevideo

8 November 2018
18:45

Boxscore

Ecuador	56–87	Brazil
Scoring by quarter: 11–21, 14–15, 18–26, 13–25

Estadio Club Atlético Atenas, Montevideo

8 November 2018
21:00

Boxscore

Paraguay	39–69	Uruguay
Scoring by quarter: 2–14, 12–17, 11–21, 14–17

Estadio Club Atlético Atenas, Montevideo

== 5th–8th place playoffs ==
5th–8th place semifinals
A3	Chile	85
B4	Ecuador	46
B3	Paraguay	62
A4	Colombia	56

5th place match
A3	Chile	73
B3	Paraguay	43
7th place match
B4	Ecuador	77
A4	Colombia	72

=== 5th–8th place semifinals ===
10 November 2018
11:00

Boxscore

Chile	85–46	Ecuador
Scoring by quarter: 16–12, 25–12, 24–4, 20–18

Estadio Club Atlético Atenas, Montevideo

10 November 2018
13:15

Boxscore

Paraguay	62–56	Colombia
Scoring by quarter: 27–11, 6–14, 13–16, 16–15

Estadio Club Atlético Atenas, Montevideo

=== 7th place match ===
11 November 2018
11:00

Boxscore

Ecuador	77–72	Colombia
Scoring by quarter: 6–22, 19–11, 25–22, 27–17

Estadio Club Atlético Atenas, Montevideo

=== 5th place match ===
11 November 2018
13:15

Boxscore

Chile	73–43	Paraguay
Scoring by quarter: 10–9, 17–14, 17–10, 29–10

Estadio Club Atlético Atenas, Montevideo

== Championship playoffs ==
Semifinals
A1	Argentina	79
B2	Brazil	85
B1	Uruguay	65
A2	Venezuela	41

Final
B2	Brazil	65
B1	Uruguay	57
3rd place match
A1	Argentina	64
A2	Venezuela	58

=== Semifinals ===
10 November 2018
19:30

Boxscore

Argentina	79–85 (OT)	Brazil
Scoring by quarter: 10–20, 13–20, 23–10, 20–16, Overtime: 13–19

Estadio Club Atlético Atenas, Montevideo

10 November 2018
21:45

Boxscore

Uruguay	65–41	Venezuela
Scoring by quarter: 13–7, 14–8, 25–9, 13–17

Estadio Club Atlético Atenas, Montevideo

=== 3rd place match ===
11 November 2018
20:00

Boxscore

Argentina	64–58	Venezuela
Scoring by quarter: 22–18, 14–9, 15–12, 13–19

Estadio Club Atlético Atenas, Montevideo

=== Final ===
11 November 2018
22:30

Boxscore

Brazil	65–57	Uruguay
Scoring by quarter: 18–13, 18–8, 14–20, 15–16

Estadio Club Atlético Atenas, Montevideo

== Final standings ==
Rank	Team
1st place, gold medalist(s)	Brazil
2nd place, silver medalist(s)	Uruguay
3rd place, bronze medalist(s)	Argentina
4	Venezuela
5	Chile
6	Paraguay
7	Ecuador
8	Colombia

Qualified for the 2019 FIBA Under-16 Americas Championship
