= Olivier Rioux =

Canadian basketball player (born 2006)

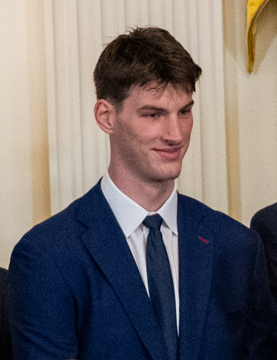
- Rioux in 2025

No. 22 – UC Irvine Anteaters
- Position: Centre
- Conference: Big West Conference

Personal information
- Born: February 2, 2006 (age 20) Terrebonne, Quebec, Canada
- Listed height: 7 ft 9 in (2.36 m)
- Listed weight: 305 lb (138 kg)

Career information
- High school: IMG Academy (Bradenton, Florida)
- College: Florida (2025–2026); UC Irvine (2026–present)
Medals
Men's basketball
Representing Canada
FIBA Under-18 AmeriCup
Bronze medal – third place	2024 Argentina	Team
FIBA Under-16 AmeriCup
Bronze medal – third place	2021 Mexico	Team

Olivier Rioux (born February 2, 2006) is a Canadian college basketball player for the UC Irvine Anteaters of the Big West Conference. He previously played for the Florida Gators. Guinness World Records declared him as the tallest teenager in the world in 2021 when he measured 7 ft 5 in (2.26 m) at the age of 15. As of 2026, he stands 7 ft 9 in (2.36 m) tall.

== Early life and high school career ==
Olivier Rioux was born in Terrebonne on February 2, 2006, to Jean-François, a 6 ft 8 in (2.03 m) photographer and former volleyball player, and Anne Gariépy, who is 6 ft 1 in (1.85 m) and works at the Royal Bank of Canada (RBC). His older brother, Émile, who is 6 ft 9 in (2.06 m), has also played basketball. The family has resided in the Anjou borough of Montreal and the suburb of Beloeil.

Rioux started playing basketball when he was five. Both he and Émile played for multiple Canadian AAU teams. Rioux first gained attention while playing internationally for the French Phenoms at 12, because by then he was already 6 ft 10 in (2.08 m) tall. He played for Real Madrid prior to attending IMG Academy in Bradenton, Florida. He also played for Canadian AAU team Brookwood Elite.

Like his fellow college basketball player, 7 ft 7 in (2.31 m) Robert Bobroczkyi, Rioux into early-mid adolescence approximated the growth of Robert Wadlow at similar ages (Bobroczkyi at times exceeding it). Rioux's growth is considered natural, as familial tall stature.

== College career ==
=== Florida (2024–2026) ===
Rioux committed to play college basketball at the University of Florida in November 2023. He was originally prospected for the 2025 recruiting class, but successfully reclassified as a member of the class of 2024. At the time of his recruitment he was listed at 7 ft 6 in (2.29 m), taller than the tallest then-active college basketball player Jamarion Sharp (7 ft 5 in (2.26 m)) and the two tallest active NBA players Boban Marjanović and Victor Wembanyama (both 7 ft 4 in (2.24 m)).

Rioux joined the 2024–25 Gators team as a preferred walk-on and with his height updated to 7 ft 9 in (2.36 m). He did not appear in any of the Gators' initial contests despite fans chanting for the tall freshman to play in garbage time; after the fourth game, head coach Todd Golden announced that Rioux was being redshirted to preserve his eligibility.

As a redshirt freshman on the 2025–26 team, Rioux checked in for the closing minutes of Florida's 104–64 win over North Florida on November 6, 2025, becoming the tallest player in college basketball history to appear in a game.

On March 31, 2026, he entered the NCAA transfer portal.

=== UC Irvine (2026–present) ===
On April 30, 2026, Rioux transferred to the University of California, Irvine to play for the UC Irvine Anteaters. In his debut, he recorded a double double of 13 points and 12 rebounds against Chapman University, becoming the tallest player to start a game.

== National team career ==
Rioux first represented Canada at the youth level during the 2021 FIBA Under-16 Americas Championship in Mexico. He helped Canada win bronze at the tournament, finishing with averages of 8.3 points and 10.3 rebounds per game. A year later, he played for Canada at the 2022 FIBA U17 World Cup in Spain. He finished the competition with averages of 2.7 points and 4.7 rebounds per game.

In June 2023, Rioux was selected to play for Canada at the 2023 FIBA U19 World Cup in Hungary. He averaged 3.2 points and 3.4 rebounds per game over the course of the tournament. The following year, at the 2024 FIBA Under-18 AmeriCup in Argentina, Rioux won his second bronze medal at the youth level. He finished the event averaging 4.5 points and 4.5 rebounds per game. Rioux was again selected to play for Canada at the 2025 FIBA U19 World Cup in Switzerland, averaging 1.6 points and 2.0 rebounds per game by the end of the tournament.

== Career statistics ==
Legend
GP	Games played	GS	Games started	MPG	Minutes per game
FG%	Field goal percentage	3P%	3-point field goal percentage	FT%	Free throw percentage
RPG	Rebounds per game	APG	Assists per game	SPG	Steals per game
BPG	Blocks per game	PPG	Points per game	**Bold**	Career high

=== College ===
Year	Team	GP	GS	MPG	FG%	3P%	FT%	RPG	APG	SPG	BPG	PPG
2024–25	Florida	Redshirt										
2025–26	Florida	11	0	1.5	.500	–	.500	.5	.1	.0	.0	.6
Career		11	0	1.5	.500	–	.500	.5	.1	.0	.0	.6
