= Canada men's national under-17 basketball team =

Canada
- FIBA zone: FIBA Americas
- National federation: Canada Basketball
- Coach: Chris Cheng

U17 World Cup
- Appearances: 8
- Medals: (bronze) Bronze: (2010)

U16 AmeriCup
- Appearances: 9
- Medals: (silver) Silver: (2015, 2017, 2019, 2023, 2025); (bronze) Bronze: (2009, 2011, 2013, 2021)

The Canada men's national under-16 and under-17 basketball team is a national basketball team of Canada, administered by Canada Basketball, the governing body for basketball in Canada. It represents the country in international under-16 and under-17 basketball competitions.

Prominent members have been RJ Barrett, Simisola Shittu and Ignas Brazdeikis who all played at the 2016 FIBA Under-17 World Championship under coach David DeAveiro.

== Competitive record ==
=== FIBA Under-17 World Cup ===
Year	Pos.	Pld	W	L
(Germany) 2010	3rd	8	5	3
(Lithuania) 2012	5th	8	5	3
(United Arab Emirates) 2014	6th	7	4	3
(Spain) 2016	5th	7	6	1
(Argentina) 2018	4th	7	5	2
(Spain) 2022	9th	7	4	3
(Turkey) 2024	8th	7	3	4
(Turkey) 2026	6th	7	4	3
(Greece) 2028	To be determined			
Total	8/9	51	33	18

=== FIBA Under-16 AmeriCup ===
Year	Result
2009	3rd place, bronze medalist(s)
2011	3rd place, bronze medalist(s)
2013	3rd place, bronze medalist(s)
2015	2nd place, silver medalist(s)
2017	2nd place, silver medalist(s)
2019	2nd place, silver medalist(s)
2021	3rd place, bronze medalist(s)
2023	2nd place, silver medalist(s)
2025	2nd place, silver medalist(s)

== See also ==
- Canada men's national basketball team
- Canada men's national under-19 basketball team
- Canada women's national under-17 basketball team
