= Ecuador men's national under-15 basketball team =

Ecuador
- FIBA zone: FIBA Americas
- National federation: Federación Ecuatoriana de Básquetbol

U17 World Cup
- Appearances: None

U16 AmeriCup
- Appearances: None

U15 South American Championship
- Appearances: 12–23 (Note: Data from 1984, 1985, 1986, 1987, 1988, 1989, 1991, 1993, 1998, 1999 and 2000 championships are not available)
- Medals: None

The Ecuador men's national under-15 basketball team is a national basketball team of Ecuador, administered by the Federación Ecuatoriana de Básquetbol. It represents the country in international men's under-15 basketball competitions.

== FIBA South America Under-15 Championship for Men participations ==
Year	Result
1996	7th
1997	9th
2002	8th
2005	9th
2007	9th
2009	7th

Year	Result
2010	7th
2014	7th
2016	7th
2018	7th
2022	6th
2024	4th

== See also ==
- Ecuador men's national basketball team
- Ecuador men's national under-17 and under-18 basketball team
- Ecuador women's national under-15 and under-16 basketball team
