= 2021 FIBA Under-16 Americas Championship =

7th FIBA Under-16 Americas Basketball Championship

Tournament details
- Host country: Mexico
- City: Xalapa
- Dates: 23–29 August
- Teams: 8 (from 1 confederation)
- Venue: 1 (in 1 host city)

Final positions
- Champions: United States (7th title)
- Runners-up: Argentina
- Third place: Canada

Tournament statistics
- MVP: (United States) Robert Dillingham
- Top scorer: (United States) Holland (19.0)
- Top rebounds: (Puerto Rico) Avilés (10.8)
- Top assists: (United States) Dillingham (6.2)
- PPG (Team): United States (116.8)
- RPG (Team): Puerto Rico (54.3)
- APG (Team): United States (32.0)

Official website
- 2021 FIBA U16 Americas Championship

The 2021 FIBA Under-16 Americas Championship was the men's international basketball competition that was held in Xalapa, Mexico, from 23 to 29 August 2021. The top four teams qualified for the 2022 FIBA Under-17 Basketball World Cup in Spain.

== Qualification ==
Eight teams from three sub zones were qualified through the Nike Youth Ranking for each sub-zone.

Sub-zone	Vacancies	Qualified
North area	2	Canada; United States
Central America and the Caribbean area (CONCENCABA)	3	Puerto Rico; Dominican Republic; Mexico
South American (CONSUBASQUET)	3	Argentina; Brazil; Chile

== Draw ==
The draw ceremony for the competition took place on August 10th at the FIBA Regional Office, in the city of Miami, Florida.

Group A	Group B
Argentina; Mexico; Brazil; Canada	Chile; United States; Puerto Rico; Dominican Republic

== Group phase ==
All times are local (UTC−5).

=== Group A ===
Pos	Team	Pld	W	L	PF	PA	PD	Pts	Qualification
1	Argentina	3	3	0	250	171	+79	6	Quarterfinals
2	Canada	3	2	1	247	183	+64	5	Quarterfinals
3	Brazil	3	1	2	174	249	−75	4	Quarterfinals
4	Mexico	3	0	3	157	225	−68	3	Quarterfinals

Source: FIBA

23 August 2021
17:30

Boxscore

Argentina	81–70	Canada
Scoring by quarter: 15–17, 20–23, 22–16, 24–14
Pts: Bocca 17; Rebs: Prome 10; Asts: Peral 5		Pts: Tyne 22; Rebs: Lioux 9 Asts: Tyne 6

USBI Gymnasium, Xalapa
Referees: Jesús López (VEN), Orlando José Varela Díaz (HON), Aline García (URU)

23 August 2021
20:30

Boxscore

Mexico	59–69	Brazil
Scoring by quarter: 20-12, 14–18, 13-22, 12-17
Pts: Soqui 21; Rebs: Verdugo 7 Asts: Cabral 3		Pts: Bianchi 22; Rebs: Vicentini Borio 15; Asts: Segantini Moreira 5

USBI Gymnasium, Xalapa
Referees: Erick Endara Estevez (ECU), Yuliet Mendez Alvarez (CUB), Delquino Vizcaíno Vicente (DOM)

24 August 2021
17:30

Boxscore

Brazil	52–98	Argentina
Scoring by quarter: 14–21, 13–29, 16-26, 9-22
Pts: Farias Cardoso 11; Rebs: Nascimento Raymundo 9 Asts: Segantini Moreira 3		Pts: Bocca 22; Rebs: Bocca 9 Asts: Respaud 7

USBI Gymnasium, Xalapa
Referees: Jesús López (VEN), Orlando José Varela Díaz (HON), Aline García (URU)

24 August 2021
20:30

Boxscore

Canada	85–49	Mexico
Scoring by quarter: 24-15, 22-10, 19-11, 20-13
Pts: Oliogu 15; Rebs: Lioux 15; Asts: Theodosiou 4		Pts: Georgelos 12; Rebs: Georgelos 10; Asts: Landavazo 2

USBI Gymnasium, Xalapa
Referees: Erick Endara Estevez (ECU), Yuliet Mendez Alvarez (CUB), Delquino Vizcaíno Vicente (DOM)

25 August 2021
17:30

Boxscore

Brazil	53–92	Canada
Scoring by quarter: 12–24, 13–24, 14-26, 14-18
Pts: Bianchi 13; Rebs: Farias Cardoso 8 Asts: De Jesus Andrade 2		Pts: Sharma 19; Rebs: Rioux 11; Asts: Tyne 6

USBI Gymnasium, Xalapa
Referees: Jesús López (VEN), Erick Endara Estevez (ECU), Yuliet Mendez Alvarez (CUB)

25 August 2021
20:30

Boxscore

Mexico	49–71	Argentina
Scoring by quarter: 12-14, 9-14, 13-28, 15-15
Pts: Escobedo 10; Rebs: Landavazo 8 Asts: Soqui 4		Pts: Respaud 11; Rebs: López 9 Asts: Peral 5

USBI Gymnasium, Xalapa
Referees: Orlando José Varela Díaz (HON), Aline García (URU), Carol Sacramento Garcia Ferro (COL)

=== Group B ===
Pos	Team	Pld	W	L	PF	PA	PD	Pts	Qualification
1	United States	3	3	0	389	200	+189	6	Quarterfinals
2	Dominican Republic	3	2	1	256	254	+2	5	Quarterfinals
3	Puerto Rico	3	1	2	215	230	−15	4	Quarterfinals
4	Chile	3	0	3	150	326	−176	3	Quarterfinals

Source: FIBA

23 August 2021
11:30

Boxscore

Chile	54–107	Dominican Republic
Scoring by quarter: 15–35, 10–23, 11-22, 18-27
Pts: Orrego 12; Rebs: Ríos 9 Asts: Pescetto 2		Pts: Ceballo 19; Rebs: Ceballo 10; Asts: Muñoz 7

USBI Gymnasium, Xalapa
Referees: Micaela Prado (ARG), Wallace Pacífico Rosa (BRA), Jesus López Díaz (MEX)

23 August 2021
14:30

Boxscore

United States	118–67	Puerto Rico
Scoring by quarter: 42-18, 22-16, 34-17, 20-16
Pts: Holland 24; Rebs: Lewis 12; Asts: Boswell 7		Pts: Lee 18; Rebs: Avilés 9 Asts: Adorno 6

USBI Gymnasium, Xalapa
Referees: Waseem Husainy (CAN), Franco Ronconi (ARG), Carol Sacramento Garcia Ferro (COL)

24 August 2021
11:30

Boxscore

Dominican Republic	74–133	United States
Scoring by quarter: 22–32, 22–37, 18-29, 12-35
Pts: Díaz 16; Rebs: Díaz 12; Asts: Muñoz 5		Pts: Tucker 22; Rebs: McNeeley 10; Asts: Curry 9

USBI Gymnasium, Xalapa
Referees: Micaela Prado (ARG), Jesus López Díaz (MEX), Carol Sacramento Garcia Ferro (COL)

24 August 2021
14:30

Boxscore

Puerto Rico	81–37	Chile
Scoring by quarter: 21-10, 27-13, 19-9, 14-5
Pts: Avilés 18; Rebs: Martínez 8 Asts: Adorno 6		Pts: Cresp 11; Rebs: Ríos 8 Asts: Stuardo 2

USBI Gymnasium, Xalapa
Referees: Franco Ronconi (ARG), Waseem Husainy (CAN), Alberto Achutegui López (MEX)

25 August 2021
11:30

Boxscore

Chile	59–138	United States
Scoring by quarter: 9–35, 17–32, 17-35, 16-36
Pts: Aguirre 15; Rebs: Orrego 7 Asts: Orrego 7		Pts: Jackson 30; Rebs: McNeeley 9 Asts: Dillingham 12

USBI Gymnasium, Xalapa
Referees: Micaela Prado (ARG), Alberto Achutegui López (MEX), Delquino Vizcaíno Vicente (DOM)

25 August 2021
14:30

Boxscore

Puerto Rico	67–75	Dominican Republic
Scoring by quarter: 8-18, 22-22, 20-16, 17-19
Pts: Avilés 17; Rebs: Avilés 12; Asts: Marín 7		Pts: Carbuccia 20; Rebs: Díaz 9 Asts: Carbuccia 8

USBI Gymnasium, Xalapa
Referees: Franco Ronconi (ARG), Waseem Hisainy (CAN), Wallace Rosa Pacífico (BRA)

== Knockout stage ==
=== Bracket ===
Fifth place
Brazil	73
Mexico	60
Seventh place
Chile	46
Puerto Rico	73

5–8th place semifinals
Chile	41
Brazil	73
Puerto Rico	78
Mexico	82

Quarterfinals
1A	Argentina	90
4B	Chile	38
2B	Dominican Republic	74
3A	Brazil	66
2A	Canada	93
3B	Puerto Rico	65
1B	United States	123
4A	Mexico	53

Semifinals
Argentina	76
Dominican Republic	74
Canada	81
United States	99

Final
Argentina	75
United States	90
Third place
Dominican Republic	76
Canada	92

=== Quarterfinals ===
27 August 2021
11:30

Boxscore

Argentina	90–38	Chile
Scoring by quarter: 22–16, 13-6, 36–5, 26–25
Pts: Peral 21; Rebs: Prome 9 Asts: Pérez 6		Pts: Cresp 15; Rebs: Ríos 8 Asts: Pescetto 2

USBI Gymnasium, Xalapa
Referees: Waseem Husainy (CAN), Yuliet Alvarez Mendez (CUB), Jesus López Díaz (MEX)

27 August 2021
14:30

Boxscore

Dominican Republic	74–66	Brazil
Scoring by quarter: 16-19, 20-17, 15–13, 23–17
Pts: Carbuccia 21; Rebs: Almonte 7 Asts: Muñoz 7		Pts: Bersch Klafke 12; Rebs: Vicentini Borio 12; Asts: Vicentini Borio 4

USBI Gymnasium, Xalapa
Referees: Orlando José Varela Díaz (HON), Alberto Achutegui López (MEX), Aline García (URU)

27 August 2021
17:30

Boxscore

Canada	93–65	Puerto Rico
Scoring by quarter: 27–14, 25-17, 17-20, 24–14
Pts: Tyne 20; Rebs: Rioux 9 Asts: Tyne 7		Pts: Avilés 22; Rebs: Avilés 11; Asts: Martínez 3

USBI Gymnasium, Xalapa
Referees: Jesús López (VEN), Micaela Prado (ARG), Wallace Pacífico Rosa (BRA)

27 August 2021
20:30

Boxscore

United States	123–53	Mexico
Scoring by quarter: 35-7, 29-17, 37–17, 22–12
Pts: Lewis 24; Rebs: Holland 10; Asts: Curry 10		Pts: Landavazo 11; Rebs: Landavazo 6 Asts: Escobedo 4

USBI Gymnasium, Xalapa
Referees: Erick Endara Estevez (ECU), Fraco Ronconi (ARG), Carol Sacramento Garcia Ferro (COL)

=== 5–8th place semifinals ===
28 August 2021
11:30

Boxscore

Chile	41–73	Brazil
Scoring by quarter: 20–15, 3-19, 6-17, 12-22
Pts: Ríos 17; Rebs: Araneda 6 Asts: Cresp 3		Pts: Farias Cardoso 15; Rebs: Nascimento Raymundo 10; Asts: De Souza Pacheco 8

USBI Gymnasium, Xalapa
Referees: Jesús López (VEN), Micaela Prado (ARG), Yuliet Mendez Alvarez (CUB)

28 August 2021
14:30

Boxscore

Puerto Rico	78–82	Mexico
Scoring by quarter: 16-24, 16-18, 22-22, 22-18
Pts: Avilés 22; Rebs: Avilés 19; Asts: Cruz 5		Pts: Soqui 20; Rebs: Georgelos 7 Asts: Escobedo 6

USBI Gymnasium, Xalapa
Referees: Waseem Husainy (CAN), Fraco Ronconi (ARG), Delquino Vizcaíno Vicente (DOM)

=== Semifinals ===
28 August 2021
17:30

Boxscore

Argentina	76–74	Dominican Republic
Scoring by quarter: 20-22, 23-15, 13-17, 20-20
Pts: Giovannetti 24; Rebs: Lomello 7 Asts: Pérez 4		Pts: Aybar 26; Rebs: Almonte 9 Asts: Liberato 4

USBI Gymnasium, Xalapa
Referees: Orlando José Varela Díaz (HON), Wallace Racífico Rosa (BRA), Aline García (URU)

28 August 2021
20:30

Boxscore

Canada	81–99	United States
Scoring by quarter: 17-28, 30-19, 13-29, 21-23
Pts: Oliogu 17; Rebs: Rioux 12; Asts: Okojie 8		Pts: Boswell 20; Rebs: Holland 16; Asts: Dillingham 4

USBI Gymnasium, Xalapa
Referees: Erick Endara Estevez (ECU), Jesus López Díaz (MEX), Carol Sacramento Garcia Ferro (COL)

=== Seventh place game ===
29 August 2021
11:30

Boxscore

Chile	46–73	Puerto Rico
Scoring by quarter: 19-22, 13-21, 9-16, 5-14
Pts: Cresp 8 Rebs: Araneda 7 Asts: Ríos 4		Pts: Gali 16; Rebs: Martínez 10; Asts: Torres 6

USBI Gymnasium, Xalapa
Referees: Alberto Achutegui López (MEX), Jesus López Díaz (MEX), Carol Sacramento Garcia Ferro (COL)

=== Fifth place game ===
29 August 2021
14:30

Boxscore

Brazil	73–60	Mexico
Scoring by quarter: 19-11, 22-17, 18-21, 14-11
Pts: Bersch Klafke 31; Rebs: Da Silva 10; Asts: De Souza Pacheco 11		Pts: Escobedo 16; Rebs: Landavazo 7 Asts: Escobedo 7

USBI Gymnasium, Xalapa
Referees: Franco Ronconi (ARG), Yuliet Mendez Alvarez (CUB), Aline García (URU)

=== Third place game ===
29 August 2021
17:30

Boxscore

Dominican Republic	76–92	Canada
Scoring by quarter: 21-22, 13-23, 20-27, 22-20
Pts: Liberato 17; Rebs: Díaz 12; Asts: Carbuccia 4		Pts: Theodosiou 15; Rebs: Yeiy 14; Asts: Okojie 7

USBI Gymnasium, Xalapa
Referees: Micaela Prado (ARG), Erick Endara Estevez (ECU), Wallace Pacífico Rosa (BRA)

=== Final ===
29 August 2021
20:30

Boxscore

Argentina	75–90	United States
Scoring by quarter: 20-11, 11-19, 19-29, 25-31
Pts: Bocca 15; Rebs: Prome 6 Asts: Singoj 4		Pts: Dillingham 31; Rebs: Holland 12; Asts: Dillingham 4

USBI Gymnasium, Xalapa
Referees: Waseem Husainy (CAN), Jesús López (VEN), Orlando José Varela Díaz (HON)

== Final ranking ==
Qualified for the 2022 FIBA Under-17 Basketball World Cup.

Rank	Team	Record
1st place, gold medalist(s)	United States	6–0
2nd place, silver medalist(s)	Argentina	5–1
3rd place, bronze medalist(s)	Canada	4–2
4	Dominican Republic	3–3
5	Brazil	3–3
6	Mexico	1–5
7	Puerto Rico	2–4
8	Chile	0-6

== Statistical leaders ==
=== Players ===
Points

Pos.	Name	PPG
1	(United States) Ronald Holland	19.0
2	(Puerto Rico) Alejandro Avilés	16.7
3	(United States) Robert Dillingham	15.7
4	(Canada) Mikkel Tyne	15.0
5	(Brazil) Eduardo Bersch Klafke	13.5

Rebounds

Pos.	Name	RPG
1	(Puerto Rico) Alejandro Avilés	10.8
2	(Canada) Olivier Rioux	10.3
3	(United States) Ronald Holland	10.2
4	(Dominican Republic) Luis Díaz	9.0
5	(Brazil) Enrico Vicentini Borio	7.5

Assists

Pos.	Name	APG
1	(United States) Robert Dillingham	6.2
2	(Brazil) Cauã De Souza Pacheco	5.8
3	(United States) Jaylen Curry	5.7
4	(Canada) Osezojie Baraka Okojie	5.5
5	(Dominican Republic) Danny Carbuccia	5.3

Steals

Pos.	Name	SPG
1	(United States) Jaylen Curry	3.8
2	(United States) Robert Dillingham	3.2
3	(Dominican Republic) Danny Carbuccia	2.8
4	(United States) Ronald Holland	2.5
4	(Dominican Republic) Yeison Liberato	2.5
4	(Argentina) Juan Peral	2.5

Blocks

Pos.	Name	BPG
1	(Puerto Rico) Alejandro Avilés	3.5
2	(Canada) Olivier Rioux	2.3
3	(United States) Justin McBride	1.8
4	(United States) Jalen Lewis	1.7
5	(Dominican Republic) Yeison Liberato	1.5

Other statistical leaders

Stat	Name	Avg.
Field goal percentage	(United States) Ronald Holland	65.3%
3-point FG percentage	(United States) Jalen Lewis	58.3%
Free throw percentage	(Mexico) Charles Georgelos	85.0%
Turnovers	(Canada) Mikkel Tyne	4.2
Fouls	(Dominican Republic) Yeison Liberato	3.0

== Awards ==
2021 Americas Under-16 champions

United States
Seventh title

- Most Valuable Player:
  - (United States) Robert Dillingham
- All-Star Five:
  - Guard (United States) Robert Dillingham
  - Forward (United States) Ron Holland
  - PG (Canada) Mikkel Tyne
  - PG (Dominican Republic) Danny Carbuccia
  - PF (Argentina) Tiziano Prome

== See also ==
- 2021 FIBA Under-16 Women's Americas Championship
