= 2023 FIBA Under-16 Americas Championship =

8th FIBA Under-16 Americas Basketball Championship

Tournament details
- Host country: Mexico
- City: Mérida
- Dates: 5–11 June 2023
- Teams: 8 (from 1 confederation)
- Venue(s): 1 (in 1 host city)

Final positions
- Champions: United States (8th title)
- Runners-up: Canada
- Third place: Puerto Rico

Tournament statistics
- MVP: (United States) Cameron Boozer

Official website
- www.fiba.basketball/history

The 2023 FIBA Under-16 Americas Championship was the men's international basketball competition that was held in Mérida, Yucatán, Mexico, from 5 to 11 June 2023. The top four teams qualified for the 2024 FIBA Under-17 Basketball World Cup in Turkey.

The United States won their eighth straight title, after defeating Canada in the final, 118–36.

== Participating teams ==
- North America:
1. United States
2. Canada
- Central America and the Caribbean: (2022 FIBA U15 Centrobasket in Gurabo, Puerto Rico, 18–22 June 2022)
1. Puerto Rico
2. Dominican Republic
3. Mexico (Hosts)
- South America: (2022 FIBA U15 South American Championship in Buenos Aires, Argentina, 16–20 November 2022)
1. Brazil
2. Argentina
3. Uruguay

== Group phase ==
In this round, the teams were drawn into two groups of four. All teams advanced to the playoffs.

All times are local (Time in Mexico – UTC-6).

=== Group A ===
Pos	Team	Pld	W	L	PF	PA	PD	Pts
1	United States	3	3	0	331	166	+165	6
2	Argentina	3	2	1	181	230	−49	5
3	Puerto Rico	3	1	2	179	216	−37	4
4	Mexico (H)	3	0	3	164	243	−79	3

Source: FIBA
(H) Hosts

5 June 2023
17:30

Boxscore

Puerto Rico	61–96	United States
Scoring by quarter: 15–25, 18–21, 13–23, 15–27

Poliforum Zamna, Mérida

5 June 2023
20:00

Boxscore

Argentina	61–59	Mexico
Scoring by quarter: 13–15, 12–12, 16–14, 20–18

Poliforum Zamna, Mérida

6 June 2023
17:30

Boxscore

United States	113–52	Argentina
Scoring by quarter: 20–13, 32–10, 32–11, 29–18

Poliforum Zamna, Mérida

6 June 2023
20:00

Boxscore

Mexico	52–60	Puerto Rico
Scoring by quarter: 19–18, 8–19, 10–11, 15–12

Poliforum Zamna, Mérida

7 June 2023
17:30

Boxscore

Puerto Rico	58–68	Argentina
Scoring by quarter: 14–13, 11–15, 21–16, 12–24

Poliforum Zamna, Mérida

7 June 2023
20:00

Boxscore

Mexico	53–122	United States
Scoring by quarter: 14–33, 7–23, 20–32, 12–34

Poliforum Zamna, Mérida

=== Group B ===
Pos	Team	Pld	W	L	PF	PA	PD	Pts
1	Canada	3	3	0	212	178	+34	6
2	Brazil	3	2	1	207	195	+12	5
3	Dominican Republic	3	1	2	200	207	−7	4
4	Uruguay	3	0	3	196	235	−39	3

Source: FIBA

5 June 2023
12:30

Boxscore

Dominican Republic	57–63	Canada
Scoring by quarter: 15–16, 16–15, 12–15, 14–17

Poliforum Zamna, Mérida

5 June 2023
15:00

Boxscore

Uruguay	55–83	Brazil
Scoring by quarter: 17–21, 10–22, 15–20, 13–20

Poliforum Zamna, Mérida

6 June 2023
12:30

Boxscore

Brazil	68–66	Dominican Republic
Scoring by quarter: 15–17, 21–16, 19–23, 13–10

Poliforum Zamna, Mérida

6 June 2023
15:00

Boxscore

Canada	75–65	Uruguay
Scoring by quarter: 22–16, 16–17, 13–16, 24–16

Poliforum Zamna, Mérida

7 June 2023
12:30

Boxscore

Canada	74–56	Brazil
Scoring by quarter: 18–12, 17–14, 16–12, 23–18

Poliforum Zamna, Mérida

7 June 2023
15:00

Boxscore

Uruguay	76–77	Dominican Republic
Scoring by quarter: 16–14, 20–19, 19–24, 21–20

Poliforum Zamna, Mérida

== Playoffs ==
=== Bracket ===
5th place match
Brazil	71
Dominican Republic	56
7th place match
Uruguay	61
Mexico	79

5th–8th place semifinals
Uruguay	51
Brazil	73
Dominican Republic	78
Mexico	68

Quarterfinals
A1	United States	123
B4	Uruguay	45
B2	Brazil	72
A3	Puerto Rico	83
A2	Argentina	74
B3	Dominican Republic	67
B1	Canada	89
A4	Mexico	63

Semifinals
United States	122
Puerto Rico	63
Argentina	58
Canada	65

Final
United States	118
Canada	36
3rd place match
Puerto Rico	86
Argentina	76

=== Quarterfinals ===
9 June 2023
12:30

Boxscore

Argentina	74–67	Dominican Republic
Scoring by quarter: 21–19, 10–8, 26–20, 17–20

Poliforum Zamna, Mérida

9 June 2023
15:00

Boxscore

Brazil	72–83 (OT)	Puerto Rico
Scoring by quarter: 19–8, 17–17, 14–15, 17–27, Overtime: 5–16

Poliforum Zamna, Mérida

9 June 2023
17:30

Boxscore

United States	123–45	Uruguay
Scoring by quarter: 35–16, 30–12, 25–9, 33–8

Poliforum Zamna, Mérida

9 June 2023
20:00

Boxscore

Canada	89–63	Mexico
Scoring by quarter: 21–16, 23–17, 13–16, 32–14

Poliforum Zamna, Mérida

=== 5th–8th place semifinals ===
10 June 2023
12:30

Boxscore

Uruguay	51–73	Brazil
Scoring by quarter: 12–25, 16–18, 17–16, 6–14

Poliforum Zamna, Mérida

10 June 2023
15:00

Boxscore

Dominican Republic	78–68	Mexico
Scoring by quarter: 15–21, 26–14, 13–18, 24–15

Poliforum Zamna, Mérida

==== 7th place match ====
11 June 2023
12:30

Boxscore

Uruguay	61–79	Mexico
Scoring by quarter: 8–25, 26–14, 13–18, 14–22

Poliforum Zamna, Mérida

==== 5th place match ====
11 June 2023
15:00

Boxscore

Brazil	71–56	Dominican Republic
Scoring by quarter: 13–9, 24–13, 16–13, 18–21

Poliforum Zamna, Mérida

=== Semifinals ===
10 June 2023
17:30

Boxscore

United States	122–63	Puerto Rico
Scoring by quarter: 32–25, 30–17, 38–7, 22–14

Poliforum Zamna, Mérida

10 June 2023
20:00

Boxscore

Argentina	58–65	Canada
Scoring by quarter: 14–16, 16–10, 12–21, 16–18

Poliforum Zamna, Mérida

==== 3rd place match ====
11 June 2023
17:30

Boxscore

Puerto Rico	86–76 (OT)	Argentina
Scoring by quarter: 17–19, 19–14, 22–14, 13–24, Overtime: 15–5

Poliforum Zamna, Mérida

==== Final ====
11 June 2023
20:00

Boxscore

United States	118–36	Canada
Scoring by quarter: 45–13, 26–10, 27–4, 20–9

Poliforum Zamna, Mérida

== Final standings ==
Rank	Team	Record
1st place, gold medalist(s)	United States	6–0
2nd place, silver medalist(s)	Canada	5–1
3rd place, bronze medalist(s)	Puerto Rico	3–3
4	Argentina	3–3
5	Brazil	2–4
6	Dominican Republic	2–4
7	Mexico	1–5
8	Uruguay	0–6

Qualified for the 2024 FIBA Under-17 Basketball World Cup

== Awards ==
2023 FIBA Under-16 Americas Championship champions

United States
Eighth title

- Most Valuable Player:
  - (United States) Cameron Boozer
- All-Tournament team:
  - (United States) Darryn Peterson (Guard)
  - (United States) Cameron Boozer (Forward)
  - (Puerto Rico) Felipe Quinones (Shooting guard)
  - (Canada) Paul Osaruyi (Power forward)
  - (Argentina) Iván Prato (Center)
