= 2024 FIBA U15 South American Championship =

International basketball competition

Tournament details
- Host country: Ecuador
- City: Pasaje
- Dates: 21–27 October 2024
- Teams: 9 (from 1 confederation)
- Venue: 1 (in 1 host city)

Final positions
- Champions: Venezuela (4th title)
- Runners-up: Brazil
- Third place: Argentina
- Fourth place: Ecuador

Official website
- www.fiba.basketball

The 2024 FIBA U15 South American Championship was the 30th and the last edition of the South American basketball championship for under-15 men's national teams. The tournament was played at Coliseo César Fadul Dibb in Pasaje, Ecuador, from 21 to 27 October 2024.

== Participating teams ==
- Argentina
- Bolivia
- Brazil
- Chile
- Colombia
- Ecuador
- Paraguay
- Uruguay
- Venezuela

== Group stage ==
In this round, the teams were drawn into two groups. The first two teams from each group advanced to the semifinals; the third and fourth teams advanced to the 5th–8th place playoffs.

All times are local (Ecuador Time – UTC-5).

=== Group A ===
| Pos | Team | Pld | W | L | PF | PA | PD | Pts | Qualification |
|---|---|---|---|---|---|---|---|---|---|
| 1 | Brazil | 4 | 4 | 0 | 279 | 192 | +87 | 8 | Semifinals |
| 2 | Venezuela | 4 | 3 | 1 | 322 | 194 | +128 | 7 | Semifinals |
| 3 | Chile | 4 | 2 | 2 | 272 | 217 | +55 | 6 | 5th–8th place playoffs |
| 4 | Uruguay | 4 | 1 | 3 | 252 | 240 | +12 | 5 | 5th–8th place playoffs |
| 5 | Bolivia | 4 | 0 | 4 | 113 | 395 | −282 | 4 | |

Source: FIBA

21 October 2024
16:30

Boxscore

| Chile | 66–56 | Uruguay |
Scoring by quarter: 21–16, 18–10, 7–14, 20–16

Coliseo César Fadul Dibb, Pasaje

21 October 2024
19:30

Boxscore

| Bolivia | 27–130 | Venezuela |
Scoring by quarter: 5–44, 10–29, 7–31, 5–26

Coliseo César Fadul Dibb, Pasaje

22 October 2024
17:00

Boxscore

| Brazil | 65–54 | Chile |
Scoring by quarter: 18–16, 18–18, 12–8, 17–12

Coliseo César Fadul Dibb, Pasaje

22 October 2024
19:30

Boxscore

| Uruguay | 100–34 | Bolivia |
Scoring by quarter: 29–9, 29–8, 20–7, 22–10

Coliseo César Fadul Dibb, Pasaje

23 October 2024
12:30

Boxscore

| Bolivia | 23–74 | Brazil |
Scoring by quarter: 6–27, 3–16, 10–18, 4–13

Coliseo César Fadul Dibb, Pasaje

23 October 2024
15:00

Boxscore

| Venezuela | 73–33 | Uruguay |
Scoring by quarter: 26–10, 17–5, 17–4, 13–14

Coliseo César Fadul Dibb, Pasaje

24 October 2024
12:30

Boxscore

| Chile | 91–29 | Bolivia |
Scoring by quarter: 17–9, 25–8, 25–3, 24–9

Coliseo César Fadul Dibb, Pasaje

24 October 2024
15:00

Boxscore

| Brazil | 73–52 | Venezuela |
Scoring by quarter: 16–16, 11–14, 30–10, 16–12

Coliseo César Fadul Dibb, Pasaje

25 October 2024
12:30

Boxscore

| Venezuela | 67–61 | Chile |
Scoring by quarter: 19–19, 15–18, 21–13, 12–11

Coliseo César Fadul Dibb, Pasaje

25 October 2024
15:00

Boxscore

| Uruguay | 63–67 (OT) | Brazil |
Scoring by quarter: 11–16, 16–9, 17–16, 10–13, Overtime: 9–13

Coliseo César Fadul Dibb, Pasaje

=== Group B ===
| Pos | Team | Pld | W | L | PF | PA | PD | Pts | Qualification |
|---|---|---|---|---|---|---|---|---|---|
| 1 | Ecuador | 3 | 3 | 0 | 232 | 182 | +50 | 6 | Semifinals |
| 2 | Argentina | 3 | 2 | 1 | 254 | 170 | +84 | 5 | Semifinals |
| 3 | Colombia | 3 | 1 | 2 | 188 | 234 | −46 | 4 | 5th–8th place playoffs |
| 4 | Paraguay | 3 | 0 | 3 | 164 | 252 | −88 | 3 | 5th–8th place playoffs |

Source: FIBA

23 October 2024
17:30

Boxscore

| Colombia | 69–68 | Paraguay |
Scoring by quarter: 11–25, 30–13, 15–15, 13–15

Coliseo César Fadul Dibb, Pasaje

23 October 2024
20:00

Boxscore

| Argentina | 66–71 | Ecuador |
Scoring by quarter: 16–25, 10–18, 22–12, 18–16

Coliseo César Fadul Dibb, Pasaje

24 October 2024
17:30

Boxscore

| Paraguay | 40–91 | Argentina |
Scoring by quarter: 13–19, 5–26, 7–27, 15–19

Coliseo César Fadul Dibb, Pasaje

24 October 2024
20:00

Boxscore

| Ecuador | 69–60 | Colombia |
Scoring by quarter: 17–7, 15–17, 16–15, 21–21

Coliseo César Fadul Dibb, Pasaje

25 October 2024
17:30

Boxscore

| Argentina | 97–59 | Colombia |
Scoring by quarter: 27–20, 36–11, 22–16, 12–12

Coliseo César Fadul Dibb, Pasaje

25 October 2024
20:00

Boxscore

| Paraguay | 56–92 | Ecuador |
Scoring by quarter: 9–18, 19–15, 16–27, 12–32

Coliseo César Fadul Dibb, Pasaje

== 5th–8th place playoffs ==
5th–8th place semifinals
A3 | Chile | 61
B4 | Paraguay | 50
B3 | Colombia | 48
A4 | Uruguay | 65

5th place match
A3 | Chile | 66
A4 | Uruguay | 63
7th place match
B4 | Paraguay | 70
B3 | Colombia | 63

=== 5th–8th place semifinals ===
26 October 2024
12:30

Boxscore

| Colombia | 48–65 | Uruguay |
Scoring by quarter: 10–18, 13–20, 8–17, 17–10

Coliseo César Fadul Dibb, Pasaje

26 October 2024
15:00

Boxscore

| Chile | 61–50 | Paraguay |
Scoring by quarter: 17–10, 13–16, 15–8, 16–16

Coliseo César Fadul Dibb, Pasaje

=== 7th place match ===
27 October 2024
12:30

Boxscore

| Paraguay | 70–63 | Colombia |
Scoring by quarter: 28–18, 13–14, 10–8, 19–23

Coliseo César Fadul Dibb, Pasaje

=== 5th place match ===
27 October 2024
15:00

Boxscore

| Chile | 66–63 | Uruguay |
Scoring by quarter: 15–15, 26–13, 8–21, 17–14

Coliseo César Fadul Dibb, Pasaje

== Championship playoffs ==
Semifinals
A1 | Brazil | 85
B2 | Argentina | 79
B1 | Ecuador | 50
A2 | Venezuela | 68

Final
A1 | Brazil | 58
A2 | Venezuela | 64
3rd place match
B2 | Argentina | 71
B1 | Ecuador | 54

=== Semifinals ===
26 October 2024
17:30

Boxscore

| Brazil | 85–79 | Argentina |
Scoring by quarter: 29–25, 7–28, 30–15, 19–11

Coliseo César Fadul Dibb, Pasaje

26 October 2024
20:00

Boxscore

| Ecuador | 50–68 | Venezuela |
Scoring by quarter: 10–11, 20–20, 11–23, 9–14

Coliseo César Fadul Dibb, Pasaje

=== 3rd place match ===
27 October 2024
17:30

Boxscore

| Argentina | 71–54 | Ecuador |
Scoring by quarter: 19–5, 16–22, 15–17, 21–10

Coliseo César Fadul Dibb, Pasaje

=== Final ===
27 October 2024
20:00

Boxscore

| Brazil | 58–64 | Venezuela |
Scoring by quarter: 9–13, 12–16, 23–19, 14–16

Coliseo César Fadul Dibb, Pasaje

== Final standings ==
| Rank | Team |
|---|---|
| 1st place, gold medalist(s) | Venezuela |
| 2nd place, silver medalist(s) | Brazil |
| 3rd place, bronze medalist(s) | Argentina |
| 4 | Ecuador |
| 5 | Chile |
| 6 | Uruguay |
| 7 | Paraguay |
| 8 | Colombia |
| 9 | Bolivia |

| Qualified for the 2025 FIBA U16 AmeriCup |
