= Colombia men's national under-15 basketball team =

Colombia
- FIBA zone: FIBA Americas
- National federation: Federación Colombiana de Baloncesto

U17 World Cup
- Appearances: None

U16 AmeriCup
- Appearances: None

U15 South American Championship
- Appearances: 14–25 (Note: Data from 1984, 1985, 1986, 1987, 1988, 1989, 1991, 1993, 1998, 1999 and 2000 championships are not available)
- Medals: (bronze) Bronze: 1 (2003)

The Colombia men's national under-15 basketball team is a national basketball team of Colombia, administered by the Federación Colombiana de Baloncesto. It represents the country in international under-15 basketball competitions.

== FIBA South America Under-15 Championship for Men participations ==
Year	Result
1997	5th
2002	4th
2003	3rd place, bronze medalist(s)
2004	4th
2007	7th
2009	5th
2010	6th

Year	Result
2011	5th
2012	6th
2014	8th
2016	5th
2018	8th
2022	5th
2024	8th

== See also ==
- Colombia men's national basketball team
- Colombia men's national under-17 and under-18 basketball team
- Colombia women's national under-17 basketball team
