= Mãozinha Pereira =

Brazilian basketball player

No. 45 – Paris Basketball
- Position: Power forward / small forward
- League: LNB Élite; EuroLeague

Personal information
- Born: 28 August 2000 (age 26) Rio de Janeiro, Brazil
- Listed height: 6 ft 8 in (2.03 m)
- Listed weight: 180 lb (82 kg)

Career information
- NBA draft: 2022: undrafted
- Playing career: 2019–present

Career history
- 2019–2020: Pinheiros Basquete
- 2020–2021: Crn Drim
- 2021–2022: Cearense
- 2022–2023: Corinthians
- 2023–2024: Mexico City Capitanes
- 2024: Memphis Grizzlies
- 2024–2025: Memphis Hustle
- 2025–2026: Manisa Basket
- 2026–present: Paris Basketball
- Stats at NBA.com
- Stats at Basketball Reference
Medals
Men's basketball
Representing Brazil
FIBA AmeriCup
Gold medal – first place	2025 Managua

João Marcello Cardoso Pereira (born 28 August 2000), commonly known as Mãozinha Pereira, or simply Mãozinha, is a Brazilian professional basketball player for Paris Basketball of the LNB Élite and the EuroLeague.

== Professional career ==
Mãozinha began his career with Pinheiros of the Novo Basquete Brasil, where he played 4 games before signing with Crn Drim of the Macedonian First League where he averaged 13.1 points and 8.1 rebounds.

=== Cearense (2021–2022) ===
On 12 August 2021, Mãozinha signed with Cearense of the Novo Basquete Brasil where he averaged 13.5 points, 9.6 rebounds, 1.1 assists and 1.3 steals.

=== Corinthians (2022–2023) ===
After going undrafted in the 2022 NBA draft, Mãozinha played the 2022–2023 season for Corinthians of the Novo Basquete Brasil, where he averaged 11.2 points, 9.8 rebounds, and 1.2 blocks.

=== Mexico City Capitanes (2023–2024) ===
On 30 October 2023, Mãozinha joined the Mexico City Capitanes of the NBA G League and on 12 January 2024, he scored a career-high 19 points along with 11 rebounds, 3 steals, and 3 blocks against the Wisconsin Herd. On 31 January, he was selected for the G League dunk contest, finishing in third place.

=== Memphis Grizzlies (2024) ===
On 20 March 2024, Mãozinha signed a 10-day contract with the Memphis Grizzlies. He had just over five minutes on the court and scored two points in his NBA debut, a 137–116 loss to the Golden State Warriors, becoming the 20th Brazilian to play in the NBA. On 30 March, he signed a second 10-day contract with the Grizzlies.

=== Memphis Hustle (2024–2025) ===
On 6 September 2024, Mãozinha re-signed with the Grizzlies, but was waived on 19 October. On 28 October, he joined the Memphis Hustle.

=== Manisa Basket (2025–2026) ===
On July 25, 2025, he signed with Manisa Basket of the Basketbol Süper Ligi (BSL).

=== Paris Basketball (2026–present) ===
On July 1, 2026, Mãozinha signed with Paris Basketball of the LNB Élite and the EuroLeague.

== Career statistics ==
Legend
GP	Games played	GS	Games started	MPG	Minutes per game
FG%	Field goal percentage	3P%	3-point field goal percentage	FT%	Free throw percentage
RPG	Rebounds per game	APG	Assists per game	SPG	Steals per game
BPG	Blocks per game	PPG	Points per game	**Bold**	Career high

=== NBA ===
Year	Team	GP	GS	MPG	FG%	3P%	FT%	RPG	APG	SPG	BPG	PPG
2023–24	Memphis	7	1	17.4	.514	.385	.700	5.3	.3	.9	.6	6.9
Career		7	1	17.4	.514	.385	.700	5.3	.3	.9	.6	6.9

=== NBA G League ===
Year	Team	GP	GS	MPG	FG%	3P%	FT%	RPG	APG	SPG	BPG	PPG
2023–24	Mexico City	24	6	20.1	.609	.313	.676	7.2	.9	1.2	1.0	8.8
