= Jubones River =

River in Ecuador

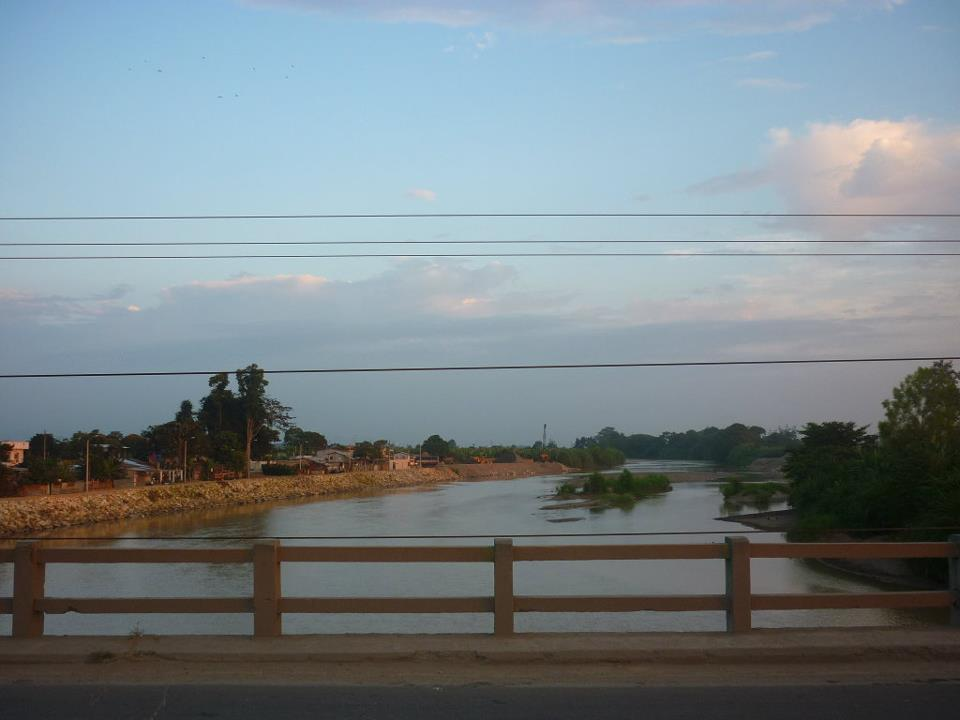
- Jubones in La Iberia

- Location of mouth

Location
- Country: Ecuador

Physical characteristics
- Mouth
  - location: Pacific Ocean
  - coordinates: 3°10′18″S 79°55′36″W
  - elevation: 0 m (0 ft)

The Jubones River is a river in Ecuador in the Azuay and El Oro provinces. It is the main river of the El Oro province. The Minas San Francisco hydroelectric project is located on the river in the Azuay province. It has the capacity to generate 270MW and an average flow of 69.53m³/s. Construction of the project commenced in 2011 and it entered into commercial operation in 2019.

The Jubones originates in the spurs of the Cordillera Occidental mountain range, one of the two principal mountain ranges/chains of the Andes in Ecuador. Its tributaries are the León and Rircay rivers. The river flows from east to west and crosses through a basin of the same name, serving as a natural border between the province of Azuay and the Loja and El Oro provinces.

Farther on, the river travels alongside Pasaje and flows into the Jambelí canal, north of Machala.

Much of its route in the coastal region is navigable by small vessels. Its riverbed has an approximate area of 5.350 square kilometers.

== See also ==
- List of rivers of Ecuador
