= Paraguay men's national under-15 and under-16 basketball team =

Paraguay
- FIBA zone: FIBA Americas
- National federation: Confederación Paraguaya de Basquetbol

U17 World Cup
- Appearances: None

U16 AmeriCup
- Appearances: 1
- Medals: None

U15 South American Championship
- Appearances: 18–26 (Note: Data from 1984, 1985, 1986, 1987, 1988, 1989, 1991 and 1993 championships are not available)
- Medals: (silver) Silver: 2 (1997, 2016); (bronze) Bronze: 3 (1998, 1999, 2000)

The Paraguay men's national under-15 and under-16 basketball team is a national basketball team of Paraguay, administered by the Confederación Paraguaya de Basquetbol. It represents the country in international men's under-15 and under-16 basketball competitions.

== FIBA South America Under-15 Championship for Men participations ==
Year	Result
1996	4th
1997	2nd place, silver medalist(s)
1998	3rd place, bronze medalist(s)
1999	3rd place, bronze medalist(s)
2000	3rd place, bronze medalist(s)
2002	7th
2003	6th
2004	7th
2005	6th

Year	Result
2006	6th
2007	6th
2009	4th
2011	6th
2012	7th
2016	2nd place, silver medalist(s)
2018	6th
2022	4th
2024	7th

== FIBA Under-16 AmeriCup participations ==
Year	Result
2017	8th

== See also ==
- Paraguay men's national basketball team
- Paraguay men's national under-17 basketball team
- Paraguay women's national under-15 basketball team
