= Chile men's national under-15 and under-16 basketball team =

Chile
- FIBA zone: FIBA Americas
- National federation: Federación de Basquetbol de Chile

U17 World Cup
- Appearances: None

U16 AmeriCup
- Appearances: 3
- Medals: None

U15 South American Championship
- Appearances: 19–29 (Note: Data from 1984, 1985, 1987, 1988, 1989, 1991, 1993, 1998, 1999 and 2000 championships are not available)
- Medals: (bronze) Bronze: 3 (1986, 2010, 2012)

The Chile men's national under-15 and under-16 basketball team is a national basketball team of Chile, administered by the Federación de Basquetbol de Chile. It represents the country in international under-15 and under-16 basketball competitions.

== FIBA South America Under-15 Championship for Men participations ==
Year	Result
1986	3rd place, bronze medalist(s)
1995	6th
1996	6th
1997	6th
2002	5th
2003	7th
2004	6th
2005	5th
2006	5th
2007	5th

Year	Result
2009	6th
2010	3rd place, bronze medalist(s)
2011	7th
2012	3rd place, bronze medalist(s)
2014	4th
2016	6th
2018	5th
2022	7th
2024	5th

== FIBA Under-16 AmeriCup participations ==
Year	Result
2019	6th
2013	5th
2023	8th

== See also ==
- Chile men's national basketball team
- Chile men's national under-17 and under-18 basketball team
- Chile women's national under-15 and under-16 basketball team
