= Argentina men's national under-17 basketball team =

Argentina
- FIBA zone: FIBA Americas
- National federation: Confederación Argentina de Basquetbol

U17 World Cup
- Appearances: 7
- Medals: None

U16 AmeriCup
- Appearances: 9
- Medals: (silver) Silver: 4 (2009, 2011, 2013, 2021); (bronze) Bronze: 1 (2015)

U15 South American Championship
- Appearances: 30
- Medals: (gold) Gold: 16 (1987, 1988, 1989, 1993, 1995, 1999, 2000, 2004, 2005, 2007, 2008, 2009, 2010, 2011, 2012, 2016); (silver) Silver: 8 (1984, 1991, 1996, 1998, 2002, 2006, 2014, 2022); (bronze) Bronze: 4 (1985, 1997, 2018, 2024)
Home	Away

The Argentina men's national under-15, under-16 and under-17 basketball team is a national basketball team of Argentina, administered by the Confederación Argentina de Basquetbol. It represents the country in international men's under-15, under-16 and under-17 basketball competitions.

== FIBA South America Under-15 Championship for Men participations ==
Year	Result
1984	2nd place, silver medalist(s)
1985	3rd place, bronze medalist(s)
1986	4th
1987	1st place, gold medalist(s)
1988	1st place, gold medalist(s)
1989	1st place, gold medalist(s)
1991	2nd place, silver medalist(s)
1993	1st place, gold medalist(s)
1995	1st place, gold medalist(s)
1996	2nd place, silver medalist(s)

Year	Result
1997	3rd place, bronze medalist(s)
1998	2nd place, silver medalist(s)
1999	1st place, gold medalist(s)
2000	1st place, gold medalist(s)
2002	2nd place, silver medalist(s)
2003	4th
2004	1st place, gold medalist(s)
2005	1st place, gold medalist(s)
2006	2nd place, silver medalist(s)
2007	1st place, gold medalist(s)

Year	Result
2008	1st place, gold medalist(s)
2009	1st place, gold medalist(s)
2010	1st place, gold medalist(s)
2011	1st place, gold medalist(s)
2012	1st place, gold medalist(s)
2014	2nd place, silver medalist(s)
2016	1st place, gold medalist(s)
2018	3rd place, bronze medalist(s)
2022	2nd place, silver medalist(s)
2024	3rd place, bronze medalist(s)

== FIBA Under-16 AmeriCup participations ==
Year	Result
2009	2nd place, silver medalist(s)
2011	2nd place, silver medalist(s)
2013	2nd place, silver medalist(s)
2015	3rd place, bronze medalist(s)
2017	4th
2019	4th
2021	2nd place, silver medalist(s)
2023	4th
2025	8th

== FIBA Under-17 Basketball World Cup record ==
Year	Pos.	Pld	W	L
(Germany) 2010	9th	7	3	4
(Lithuania) 2012	6th	8	4	4
(United Arab Emirates) 2014	10th	7	4	3
(Spain) 2016	13th	7	2	5
(Argentina) 2018	11th	7	3	4
(Spain) 2022	11th	7	3	4
(Turkey) 2024	10th	7	3	4
(Turkey) 2026	Did not qualify			
(Greece) 2028	To be determined			
Total	7/9	43	19	24

== See also ==
- Argentina men's national basketball team
- Argentina men's national under-19 basketball team
- Argentina women's national under-17 basketball team
