= Brazil men's national under-17 basketball team =

Brazil
- FIBA zone: FIBA Americas
- National federation: Brazilian Basketball Confederation

U17 World Cup
- Appearances: None

U16 AmeriCup
- Appearances: 7
- Medals: None

U15 South American Championship
- Appearances: 27–28 (Note: Data from the 1998 championship are not available)
- Medals: (gold) Gold: 10 (1984, 1985, 1991, 1996, 1997, 2002, 2006, 2014, 2018, 2022); (silver) Silver: 12 (1986, 1987, 1988, 1989, 1993, 1995, 1999, 2003, 2009, 2010, 2011, 2024); (bronze) Bronze: 4 (2004, 2005, 2007, 2008)
Home	Away

The Brazil men's national under-15, under-16 and under-17 basketball team is a national basketball team of Brazil, administered by the Brazilian Basketball Confederation (Portuguese: Confederação Brasileira de Basketball), abbreviated as CBB. It represents the country in international men's under-15, under-16 and under-17 basketball competitions.

== FIBA South America Under-15 Championship for Men participations ==
Year	Result
1984	1st place, gold medalist(s)
1985	1st place, gold medalist(s)
1986	2nd place, silver medalist(s)
1987	2nd place, silver medalist(s)
1988	2nd place, silver medalist(s)
1989	2nd place, silver medalist(s)
1991	1st place, gold medalist(s)
1993	2nd place, silver medalist(s)
1995	2nd place, silver medalist(s)

Year	Result
1996	1st place, gold medalist(s)
1997	1st place, gold medalist(s)
1999	2nd place, silver medalist(s)
2002	1st place, gold medalist(s)
2003	2nd place, silver medalist(s)
2004	3rd place, bronze medalist(s)
2005	3rd place, bronze medalist(s)
2006	1st place, gold medalist(s)
2007	3rd place, bronze medalist(s)

Year	Result
2008	3rd place, bronze medalist(s)
2009	2nd place, silver medalist(s)
2010	2nd place, silver medalist(s)
2011	2nd place, silver medalist(s)
2012	4th
2014	1st place, gold medalist(s)
2018	1st place, gold medalist(s)
2022	1st place, gold medalist(s)
2024	2nd place, silver medalist(s)

== FIBA Under-16 AmeriCup participations ==
Year	Result
2009	5th
2011	5th
2015	5th
2019	5th
2021	5th
2023	5th
2025	5th

== Head coach position ==
- (Brazil) Pablo Costa – 2013

== See also ==
- Brazil men's national basketball team
- Brazil men's national under-19 basketball team
- Brazil women's national under-17 basketball team
- Brazil men's national 3x3 team
