= Uruguay men's national under-15 and under-16 basketball team =

Uruguay
- FIBA zone: FIBA Americas
- National federation: FUBB

U17 World Cup
- Appearances: None

U16 AmeriCup
- Appearances: 3
- Medals: None

U15 South American Championship
- Appearances: 24–30 (Note: Data from 1985, 1986, 1987, 1993, 1998 and 1999 championships are not available)
- Medals: (silver) Silver: 5 (2000, 2004, 2005, 2012, 2018); (bronze) Bronze: 9 (1984, 1988, 1989, 1991, 1996, 2006, 2009, 2011, 2022)

The Uruguay men's national under-15 and under-16 basketball team is a national basketball team of Uruguay, administered by the Federación Uruguaya de Básquetbol - "FUBB". It represents the country in international under-15 and under-16 basketball competitions.

== FIBA South America Under-15 Championship for Men participations ==
Year	Result
1984	3rd place, bronze medalist(s)
1988	3rd place, bronze medalist(s)
1989	3rd place, bronze medalist(s)
1991	3rd place, bronze medalist(s)
1995	5th
1996	3rd place, bronze medalist(s)
1997	7th
2000	2nd place, silver medalist(s)

Year	Result
2002	6th
2003	5th
2004	2nd place, silver medalist(s)
2005	2nd place, silver medalist(s)
2006	3rd place, bronze medalist(s)
2007	4th
2008	4th
2009	3rd place, bronze medalist(s)

Year	Result
2010	5th
2011	3rd place, bronze medalist(s)
2012	2nd place, silver medalist(s)
2014	5th
2016	4th
2018	2nd place, silver medalist(s)
2022	3rd place, bronze medalist(s)
2024	6th

== FIBA Under-16 AmeriCup participations ==
Year	Result
2013	6th
2019	8th
2023	8th

== See also ==
- Uruguay men's national basketball team
- Uruguay men's national under-19 basketball team
- Uruguay women's national under-15 basketball team
