= Venezuela men's national under-17 basketball team =

Venezuela
- FIBA zone: FIBA Americas
- National federation: Federación Venezolana de Baloncesto
- Coach: Alexis Cedres

U17 World Cup
- Appearances: 1

U16 AmeriCup
- Appearances: 4
- Medals: (bronze) Bronze: (2025)

U15 South American Championship
- Appearances: 21–27 (Note: Data from 1984, 1988, 1989, 1991, 1999 and 2000 championships are not available)
- Medals: (gold) Gold: (1986, 1998, 2003, 2024); (silver) Silver: (1985, 2007, 2008); (bronze) Bronze: (1987, 1993, 1995, 2002, 2014, 2016)

The Venezuela men's national under-15, under-16 and under-17 basketball team is a national basketball team of Venezuela, administered by the Venezuelan Basketball Federation. It represents the country in international under-15, under-16 and under-17 basketball competitions.

== Tournament record ==
=== FIBA Under-17 World Cup ===
Year	Result
2026	16th

=== FIBA Under-16 AmeriCup ===
Year	Result
2009	4th
2015	7th
2017	7th
2025	3rd place, bronze medalist(s)

=== FIBA South America Under-15 Championship ===
Year	Result
1985	2nd place, silver medalist(s)
1986	1st place, gold medalist(s)
1987	3rd place, bronze medalist(s)
1993	3rd place, bronze medalist(s)
1995	3rd place, bronze medalist(s)
1997	4th
1998	1st place, gold medalist(s)

Year	Result
2002	3rd place, bronze medalist(s)
2003	1st place, gold medalist(s)
2004	5th
2005	4th
2006	4th
2007	2nd place, silver medalist(s)
2008	2nd place, silver medalist(s)

Year	Result
2010	4th
2011	4th
2012	5th
2014	3rd place, bronze medalist(s)
2016	3rd place, bronze medalist(s)
2018	4th
2024	1st place, gold medalist(s)

== See also ==
- Venezuela men's national basketball team
- Venezuela men's national under-19 basketball team
- Venezuela women's national under-15 and under-16 basketball team
