= Pasaje =

- City of Ecuador
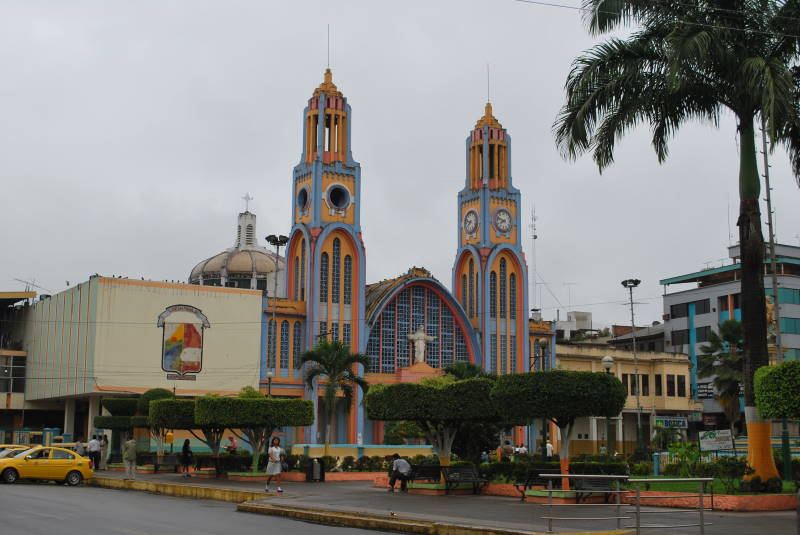
- Central park "Abdón Calderon" of Pasaje
- Motto: Pueblo libre, de libres y fuertes (Free city, of free and strong)
- Anthem: Anthem of Pasaje
- Location of Pasaje in Ecuador
- Coordinates: 3.3269°S 79.8049°W
- Country: Ecuador
- Province: El Oro
- Canton: Pasaje Canton

Area
  - Town: 19.46 km^{2} (7.51 sq mi)

Population (2022 census)
  - Town: 60,147
  - Density: 3,091/km^{2} (8,005/sq mi)

Pasaje, also known as Pasaje de las Nieves, is an Ecuadorian city; the head of Pasaje Cantón, and the second biggest and second most populated city of the El Oro Province. It is located in the southern Coastal Region, seated in a vast plain between the Jubones river to the north and el Palenque to the south, at an altitude of 30 m (98 ft) above sea level and with a tropical climate of 25 °C (77 °F) on average.

According to the 2022 census, Pasaje had a population of 60,147 residents, making it the twenty-third most populated city in Ecuador. Its economic, social, and commercial activity is strongly bound to Machala, as it forms part of the metropolitan area of Machala, being a commuter town for thousands of people who travel there via ground transport daily. The area is home to 576,772 inhabitants and occupies the 7th position among the conurbations of Ecuador.

The origins of the city date to the 18th century, but it is around the 20th century, due to banana production, that there was an accelerated population growth, making the city into one of the main urban centers of the province. Pasaje is one of the most important administrative, economic, financial, and commercial centers of El Oro province. The primary activities of the city are the banana industry and trade.

== Politics ==
The city of Pasaje is organized into four urban parishes. Together with another six rural parishes this makes up the total area of Pasaje Cantón. The term “parish” (“parroquia”) is used in Ecuador to refer to territories within the Municipal Administrative Division.

The city and the Cantón of Pasaje, like other Ecuadorian towns, is governed by a municipality as prescribed by the Constitution of the Republic. The Decentralized Autonomous Municipal Government of Pasaje is a regional government entity that governs the Cantón autonomously from the central government. The municipality is organized by the separation of the executive powers, represented by the mayor, and the legislative powers, made up by the members of the cantonal council.

The Municipality of Pasaje is governed primarily by what is stipulated in articles 253 and 264 of the Political Constitution of the Republic and by the Organic Code of Territorial Organization, Autonomy, and Decentralization (COOTAD).

=== Mayor ===
The executive power of the city is held by one citizen with the title of mayor of Pasaje Cantón, who is elected by direct vote in a single round of voting. The vice mayor is not elected in the same way, instead, once installed, the Cantonal Council votes on one council member to take on that job. The mayor and the vice mayor stay four years in their positions, and the mayor is able to be reelected immediately or in later elections. The mayor is the highest representative of the municipality and has the leading vote in the Cantonal Council, and the vice mayor completes the functions of the mayor as a substitute while the mayor cannot.

The mayor has their own cabinet for municipal administration, formed by directorates in advisory, support, and operational capacities. The leaders of these municipal directorates are designated by the mayor themself. Currently, the mayor of Pasaje is Jovanny Coronel, elected for the term 2023 - 2027.

=== Cantonal Council ===
The legislative power of the city is exercised by the Cantonal Council of Pasaje, a small single-chamber parliament identical to that of every Canton, as decreed in article 253 of the National Political Constitution. In accordance with what is established in the law, the amount of members in the council proportionally represents the population of the Cantón.

Pasaje possesses seven councilmembers, who are elected by vote (D’Hondt method) and remain in their positions for four years, though are able to be reelected indefinitely. The mayor and the vice mayor preside over the Council in their sessions. As the Cantonal Council was recently installed for the first time, the members select from among themselves someone to take on the role of vice mayor of the city.

=== Political Division ===
The Cantón is divided into parishes that may be either urban or rural. They are represented by Parroquial Governments before the Mayor of Pasaje. The city has four urban parishes:

- Ochoa León
- Bolívar
- Loma de Franco
- Tres Cerritos

== Tourism ==
The city has a growing reputation as a tourist destination. Through the years, Pasaje has notably increased its touristic offerings and recently experienced a growth in tourism thanks to the touristic campaign undertaken by the National Government: “All you need is Ecuador”. The city’s tourism focuses on its natural beauty and cuisine. With regard to ecological tourism, the city has spacious green areas at its outskirts and the majority of the forests and tourist attractions nearby are under its jurisdiction.

== Transport ==
Public transport is the principal means of transport by the inhabitants of the city and its outskirts. The city has an expanding Urban Public Bus Service, and is one of the few cities in the Oro province that has one. The bus system is not extensive and is formed by a few urban transport companies. The fare of the bus system is 0.35 USD, with a 50% discount for priority groups (minors, seniors, disabled people, and others). There also exist inter-parish and inter-cantonal buses for transport to nearby areas.

Most of the streets in the city are paved or cobbled, although some are worn away, and the rest are ballasted, primarily in the new neighborhoods that expand at the periphery of the city.

=== Important avenues ===
- Jubones
- Quito
- 9 de mayo
- Sucre
- Ochoa León
- Perimetral

== Education ==
The city has good educational infrastructure. Public education in the city, like in the rest of the country, is free until university (third level) in accordance with the stipulations in article 348 and ratified in articles 356 and 357 of the National Constitution. Many of the city’s schools have great prestige. The city is under the Coastal system so its classes start in the first days of April, and after 200 days of classes, they end in the month of February. The educational infrastructure presents problems each year due to classes starting right after winter, as the rains usually destroy many parts of the school campuses, partly due to the bad quality of construction materials.

== Economy ==
Pasaje is a city of ample commercial activity. It is home to big financial and commercial organizations of the area. Its economy is based on trade, livestock, and agriculture. Because it is an agricultural area, Pasaje has a great variety of production that serve for exportation and for internal consumption within the country. The principal incomes of Pasajeños are formal and informal trade, business, agriculture, and aquaculture. The trade of the majority of the population consists of SMEs and micro-enterprises, constituting the informal economy that provides employment to thousands of people.

The commercial activity and the benefits that they offer are also seen at a corporate level. The opportunities of the private sector in developing business models that generate economic, environmental, and social value, are reflected in the development of new structures. Private investment has formed a part in the process of the growth of the city. And real estate projects, private housing developments, and offices, have been on the rise, turning the city into a strategic and attractive location for the province’s business.

== Means of Communication ==
The city has a communication network in constant development and modernization. In the city there are many communication methods available, like written press, radio, television, telephone, internet, and postal service.

- Telefone: Although fixed telephone is still maintained with periodic growth, this has been displaced considerably for the cellular phone, both for the vast coverage it offers, and the easy accessibility. There are 3 operators of fixed telephone; CNT (public), TVCABLE, and Claro (private), and 4 operators of cellular telephone; Movistar, Claro, and Tuenti (private), and CNT (public)
- Radio: There is a large quantity of radio systems in the area as well as from nearby provinces and cantons with transmission nationally and locally.
- Television Media: the majority of the channels are national, although they have added local channels recently. The analogue blackout was established for the 31st of December in 2023.

== Sports ==
The Cantonal Sport League of Pasaje is the governing body of sport in all of the Cantón. Therefore, in the city, it exercises its authority of control. The most popular sport in the city, just like in the entire country, is football, which is the sport with the most turnout. The Youth Reserve Sports Club of the Jubones, and the Bonita Banana Sporting Club are Pasajan teams in the Professional Football Association of El Oro, which participates in the Provincial Football Championship of the Second Category of El Oro. Since Pasaje was a small town during the time of the founding of the big teams of the country, Pasaje lacks a symbolic city team, so its inhabitants are mostly fans of the Guayaquil clubs: Barcelona Sporting Club and Club Sport Emelec.

The primary sports facility for football practice is the Carlos Falquez Batallas Stadium, located on Quito avenue. It is used mostly for football practice and has a capacity of 5000 spectators. The stadium is a host of different local sports events, as well as a venue for various cultural events, especially music concerts.

== Climate ==
Climate data for Pasaje, elevation 15 m (49 ft), (1971–2000)
Month	Jan	Feb	Mar	Apr	May	Jun	Jul	Aug	Sep	Oct	Nov	Dec	Year
Mean daily maximum °C (°F)	30.3 (86.5)	30.8 (87.4)	31.3 (88.3)	31.8 (89.2)	30.0 (86.0)	28.1 (82.6)	26.7 (80.1)	26.5 (79.7)	26.6 (79.9)	26.2 (79.2)	26.9 (80.4)	29.1 (84.4)	28.7 (83.6)
Mean daily minimum °C (°F)	21.5 (70.7)	22.0 (71.6)	22.0 (71.6)	22.0 (71.6)	21.6 (70.9)	20.7 (69.3)	20.0 (68.0)	19.7 (67.5)	19.7 (67.5)	20.0 (68.0)	19.9 (67.8)	20.9 (69.6)	20.8 (69.5)
Average precipitation mm (inches)	102.0 (4.02)	143.0 (5.63)	132.0 (5.20)	96.0 (3.78)	46.0 (1.81)	38.0 (1.50)	26.0 (1.02)	24.0 (0.94)	30.0 (1.18)	36.0 (1.42)	28.0 (1.10)	44.0 (1.73)	745 (29.33)
Average relative humidity (%)	80	80	80	79	82	84	85	85	86	87	85	80	83
Source: FAO

== See also ==
- Cities of Ecuador
- El Oro Province
- Pasaje Cantón
- Machala Conurbation
- Machala
