= FIBA U16 AmeriCup =

Under-16 basketball championship

- Most recent season or competition: 2025 FIBA U16 AmeriCup
- Formerly: FIBA Under-16 Americas Championship
- Sport: Basketball
- Founded: 2009; 17 years ago
- Organizing body: FIBA Americas
- No. of teams: 8
- Continent: Americas
- Most recent champions: United States (9th title)
- Most titles: United States (9 titles)
- Qualification: FIBA Under-17 Basketball World Cup
- Related competitions: FIBA U18 AmeriCup
- Website: www.fiba.basketball/history

The FIBA U16 AmeriCup, previously known as the FIBA Under-16 Americas Championship, is the Americas basketball championship for men's under-16 national teams that takes place every two years in the FIBA Americas zone. The inaugural edition of this event was held in 2009.

The top four finishers qualify for the FIBA Under-17 Basketball World Cup.

== Qualification ==
USA and Canada participate in the Under-16 AmeriCup without playing qualifiers. The top three teams from the Under-15 Centrobasket along with the top three teams from the Under-15 South American Championship qualify for this event.

== Summary ==
Year	Host	Final			Third place game		
Year	Host	Gold	Score	Silver	Bronze	Score	Fourth place
2009; Details	Argentina (Mendoza)	United States	101–87	Argentina	Canada	106–81	Venezuela
2011; Details	Mexico (Cancún)	United States	104–64	Argentina	Canada	86–65	Puerto Rico
2013; Details	Uruguay (Maldonado)	United States	94–48	Argentina	Canada	62–50	Puerto Rico
2015; Details	Argentina (Bahía Blanca)	United States	77–60	Canada	Argentina	74–59	Dominican Republic
2017; Details	Argentina (Formosa)	United States	111–60	Canada	Puerto Rico	78–67	Argentina
2019; Details	Brazil (Belém)	United States	94–77	Canada	Dominican Republic	80–77	Argentina
2021; Details	Mexico (Xalapa)	United States	90–75	Argentina	Canada	92–76	Dominican Republic
2023; Details	Mexico (Mérida)	United States	118–36	Canada	Puerto Rico	86–76 (OT)	Argentina
2025; Details	Mexico (Ciudad Juárez)	United States	108–71	Canada	Venezuela	84–76	Puerto Rico
2027; Details	TBD (TBD)						

== Medal table ==
Rank	Nation	Gold	Silver	Bronze	Total
1	United States	9	0	0	9
2	Canada	0	5	4	9
3	Argentina	0	4	1	5
4	Puerto Rico	0	0	2	2
5	Dominican Republic	0	0	1	1
5	Venezuela	0	0	1	1
Totals (6 entries)		9	9	9	27

== Participation details ==
Team	(Argentina); 2009	(Mexico); 2011	(Uruguay); 2013	(Argentina); 2015	(Argentina); 2017	(Brazil); 2019	(Mexico); 2021	(Mexico); 2023	(Mexico); 2025	2027	Total
Argentina	2nd	2nd	2nd	3rd	4th	4th	2nd	4th	8th		9
Bahamas	7th	—	7th	—	—	—	—	—	—		2
Brazil	5th	5th	—	5th	—	5th	5th	5th	5th		7
Canada	3rd	3rd	3rd	2nd	2nd	2nd	3rd	2nd	2nd		9
Chile	—	6th	5th	—	—	—	8th	—	—		3
Costa Rica	—	8th	—	—	—	—	—	—	—		1
Dominican Republic	—	—	—	4th	5th	3rd	4th	6th	6th		6
Mexico	8th	7th	8th	8th	6th	7th	6th	7th	7th		9
Paraguay	—	—	—	—	8th	—	—	—	—		1
Puerto Rico	6th	4th	4th	6th	3rd	6th	7th	3rd	4th		9
United States	1st	1st	1st	1st	1st	1st	1st	1st	1st		9
Uruguay	—	—	6th	—	—	8th	—	8th	—		3
Venezuela	4th	—	—	7th	7th	—	—	—	3rd		4

== Under-17 World Cup record ==
Team	(Germany) 2010	(Lithuania) 2012	(United Arab Emirates) 2014	(Spain) 2016	(Argentina) 2018	(Spain) 2022	(Turkey) 2024	(Turkey) 2026	(Greece) 2028	Total
Argentina	9th	6th	10th	13th	11th	11th	10th	—		7
Canada	3rd	5th	6th	5th	4th	9th	8th	6th		8
Dominican Republic	—	—	—	11th	9th	13th	—	—		3
Puerto Rico	—	—	5th	—	3rd	—	6th	8th		4
United States	1st	1st	1st	1st	1st	1st	1st	1st		8
Venezuela	—	—	—	—	—	—	—	15th		1
Total	3	3	4	4	5	4	4	4	4	

== MVP Awards ==
Year	MVP Award Winner
2009	(United States) Bradley Beal
2011	(United States) Jabari Parker
2013	(United States) Malik Newman
2015	(United States) Gary Trent Jr.
2017	(United States) Vernon Carey Jr.
2019	(United States) Chris Livingston
2021	(United States) Rob Dillingham
2023	(United States) Cameron Boozer
2025	(United States) Nasir Anderson

== See also ==
- FIBA Under-18 AmeriCup
- FIBA Under-16 Women's AmeriCup
- FIBA Under-18 Women's AmeriCup
