= 2018 FIBA Under-17 Basketball World Cup squads =

This article shows the rosters of all participating teams at the 2018 FIBA Under-17 Basketball World Cup in Argentina.

Squad was announced on FIBA website.

== Group A ==
=== Australia ===
A 12-player squad was announced on 9 May 2018.

Australia men's national under-17 basketball team roster
Players
Coaches

Pos.	No.	Name	Age – Date of birth	Height	Club
F	4	Blake Jones	16 – 28 February 2002	2.08 m (6 ft 10 in)	(Australia) Queensland
G	5	Hunter Madden	17 – 18 March 2001	1.86 m (6 ft 1 in)	(Australia) New South Wales
G	6	Hunter Clarke	16 – 6 August 2001	1.96 m (6 ft 5 in)	(Australia) Tasmania
G	7	Tamuri Wigness	16 – 26 March 2002	1.84 m (6 ft 0 in)	(Australia) Queensland
G	8	Jay Rantall	17 – 10 June 2001	1.84 m (6 ft 0 in)	(Australia) Victoria
G/F	9	Wani Swaka Lo Buluk	17 – 9 June 2001	1.98 m (6 ft 6 in)	Western Australia
F	10	Luke Travers	16 – 3 September 2001	2.01 m (6 ft 7 in)	Western Australia
G	11	Joel Capetola	17 – 5 February 2001	1.88 m (6 ft 2 in)	(Australia) Victoria
F	12	Luke Jackson	16 – 29 September 2001	2.00 m (6 ft 7 in)	Western Australia
F	13	Joshua Bannan	17 – 26 February 2001	2.08 m (6 ft 10 in)	(Australia) Victoria
C	14	Kobe Williamson	16 – 24 August 2001	2.03 m (6 ft 8 in)	(Australia) Victoria
C	15	Campbell Green	17 – 4 April 2001	2.02 m (6 ft 8 in)	(Australia) New South Wales

Head coach

Justin Schueller

Assistant coach(es)

David Ingham
Nathan Cooper-Brown

=== Dominican Republic ===
A 12-player squad was announced on 23 June 2018.

Dominican Republic men's national under-17 basketball team roster
Players
Coaches

Pos.	No.	Name	Age – Date of birth	Height	Club
F	0	Jhamyl Frías	17 – 19 April 2001	1.91 m (6 ft 3 in)	(Dominican Republic) Club Mauricio Báez
G	3	Jean Montero	14 – 3 July 2003	1.88 m (6 ft 2 in)	(Dominican Republic) DOSA
G	4	Richard Ortega	17 – 24 April 2001	1.70 m (5 ft 7 in)	(Dominican Republic) Club Juan Pablo Duarte
G	7	Giancarlo Valdez	17 – 3 May 2001	1.84 m (6 ft 0 in)	(United States) Decatur Heritage Christian
F	8	David Jones	16 – 24 November 2001	1.94 m (6 ft 4 in)	(Dominican Republic) Club Centro
G	9	Emmanuel Rodríguez	16 – 4 October 2001	1.82 m (6 ft 0 in)	(Dominican Republic) 29 de Junio
G	10	Lorenzo Baldera	15 – 30 July 2002	1.83 m (6 ft 0 in)	(Dominican Republic) Club Naco
F	11	Alexis Reyes	16 – 9 February 2002	2.00 m (6 ft 7 in)	(United States) Cushing Academy
F	12	Giancarlo Bastianoni	17 – 27 February 2001	1.99 m (6 ft 6 in)	(United States) Calusa Prep
F	13	Enmanuel Ferreras	17 – 18 April 2001	1.94 m (6 ft 4 in)	(Dominican Republic) Club Bameso
G	14	Sdenry González	16 – 7 June 2002	1.85 m (6 ft 1 in)	(Dominican Republic) Club San Lázaro
G/F	23	Isaiah Rivera	16 – 24 September 2001	1.96 m (6 ft 5 in)	(United States) Geneseo High School

Head coach

Alex Arias

Assistant coach(es)

José Cabrera
Eddy García

=== Puerto Rico ===
A 12-player squad was announced on 22 June 2018.

Puerto Rico men's national under-17 basketball team roster
Players
Coaches

Pos.	No.	Name	Age – Date of birth	Height	Club
F	4	Phillip Wheeler	16 – 23 April 2002	2.01 m (6 ft 7 in)	(United States) St. Benedict's Prep
G	5	Tory San Antonio	17 – 1 June 2001	1.94 m (6 ft 4 in)	(United States) Moreno Valley HS
G	6	Luis Rolón	16 – 15 December 2001	1.85 m (6 ft 1 in)	(United States) Central Pointe Christian Academy
G	7	André Curbelo	16 – 13 October 2001	1.87 m (6 ft 2 in)	(United States) Long Island Lutheran
G	8	Sebastián Martínez	16 – 14 July 2001	1.83 m (6 ft 0 in)	(United States) Central Pointe Christian Academy
G	10	Diego González	16 – 2 August 2001	1.84 m (6 ft 0 in)	(United States) Miami Christian School
F	11	Jermaine Miranda	17 – 17 April 2001	1.95 m (6 ft 5 in)	(Puerto Rico) Club San Lázaro
G	12	Derek Luna	17 – 15 February 2001	1.91 m (6 ft 3 in)	(United States) Pioneer HS
F	13	Diego Romero	16 – 27 February 2002	1.95 m (6 ft 5 in)	(Puerto Rico) CIEM Avancée
F	14	Christian Cruz	16 – 8 November 2001	2.01 m (6 ft 7 in)	(United States) Pensacola State College
G	16	Víctor Rosas	17 – 13 January 2001	1.91 m (6 ft 3 in)	(Puerto Rico) Colegio Santa María
F/C	17	Harry Sosa	17 – 26 April 2001	1.98 m (6 ft 6 in)	(United States) Ivy High School

Head coach

Omar González

Assistant coach(es)

Raymond Cintron
José Ocasio
Ivan Rios
Miguel Torres

=== Turkey ===
A 12-player squad was announced on 26 June 2018.

Turkey men's national under-17 basketball team roster
Players
Coaches

Pos.	No.	Name	Age – Date of birth	Height	Club
G	1	Ömercan İlyasoğlu	17 – 1 January 2001	1.93 m (6 ft 4 in)	(Turkey) Anadolu Efes
F	2	Tibet Görener	15 – 27 July 2002	2.01 m (6 ft 7 in)	(Turkey) Darüşşafaka
G	4	Ömer Yasir Küçük	17 – 26 February 2001	1.86 m (6 ft 1 in)	(Turkey) Anadolu Efes
G	7	Mustafa Kurtuldum	17 – 10 May 2001	1.96 m (6 ft 5 in)	(Turkey) Anadolu Efes
G	9	Kerem Öztürk	17 – 16 April 2001	1.84 m (6 ft 0 in)	(United States) New Hampton School
G	10	Atakan Erdek	17 – 26 June 2001	1.94 m (6 ft 4 in)	(Turkey) Bandırma Kırmızı
C	11	Alperen Şengün	15 – 25 July 2002	2.06 m (6 ft 9 in)	(Turkey) Banvit
C	12	Furkan Haltalı	15 – 2 December 2002	2.07 m (6 ft 9 in)	(Turkey) Banvit
F	15	Tarık Sezgün	17 – 17 April 2001	2.11 m (6 ft 11 in)	(Turkey) Anadolu Efes
G	17	Önder Atun	17 – 22 May 2001	1.92 m (6 ft 4 in)	(Turkey) Banvit
F	19	Çağatay Özkan	16 – 9 July 2001	1.99 m (6 ft 6 in)	(Turkey) Anadolu Efes
C	34	Adem Bona	15 – 28 March 2003	2.06 m (6 ft 9 in)	(Turkey) İstanbul DSİ

Head coach

Ahmet Gürgen

Assistant coach(es)

Rüçhan Tamsöz
Alper Koç

== Group B ==
=== China ===
A 12-player squad was announced on 29 June 2018.

China men's national under-17 basketball team roster
Players
Coaches

Pos.	No.	Name	Age – Date of birth	Height	Club
C	5	Zhao Shihao	17 – 5 January 2001	2.16 m (7 ft 1 in)	(China) Zhejiang Golden Bulls
G	6	Yang Ali	17 – 6 January 2001	1.92 m (6 ft 4 in)	(China) Shenzhen Leopards
G	7	Chen Pengyudi	17 – 6 February 2001	1.86 m (6 ft 1 in)	(China) Tsinghua University High School
G	8	Saimaiti Xierzhati	17 – 5 May 2001	1.92 m (6 ft 4 in)	(China) Xinjiang Flying Tigers
F	9	Lu Pengyu	16 – 3 July 2001	1.97 m (6 ft 6 in)	(China) Shenzhen Leopards
G	10	Sun Haoqin	15 – 28 January 2003	1.91 m (6 ft 3 in)	(China) Shenzhen Leopards
F	11	Yan Shi	17 – 23 June 2001	1.97 m (6 ft 6 in)	(China) Liaoning Flying Leopards
G	12	Qu Honglin	15 – 1 July 2002	1.90 m (6 ft 3 in)	(China) Guangdong Southern Tigers
G	13	Zhang Mingmin	17 – 22 January 2001	1.91 m (6 ft 3 in)	(China) Bayi Rockets
F	15	Tong Xin	16 – 1 December 2001	1.94 m (6 ft 4 in)	(China) Shenzhen Leopards
C	16	Jiao Boqiao	16 – 2 September 2001	2.09 m (6 ft 10 in)	(China) Liaoning Flying Leopards
F	17	Tuxun Alziamaiti	16 – 25 January 2002	2.03 m (6 ft 8 in)	(China) Xinjiang Flying Tigers

Head coach

Yuan Yuan

Assistant coach(es)

Bai Jie
Li Zheng

=== Mali ===
A 12-player squad was announced on 25 June 2018.

Mali men's national under-17 basketball team roster
Players
Coaches

Pos.	No.	Name	Age – Date of birth	Height	Club
F	4	Fousseny Dieng	17 – 17 May 2001	1.92 m (6 ft 4 in)	(Mali) Real Bamako
G	5	Siriman Kanouté	16 – 25 September 2001	1.75 m (5 ft 9 in)	(France) SLUC Nancy
F	6	Alou Traoré	17 – 10 June 2001	2.01 m (6 ft 7 in)	(France) Centre Piariste
F	7	Michel Coulibaly	15 – 14 October 2002	2.03 m (6 ft 8 in)	(Mali) Real Bamako
G	8	Bourama Coulibaly	15 – 25 July 2002	1.85 m (6 ft 1 in)	(Mali) Real Bamako
G/F	10	Mohamed Sidibé	16 – 25 May 2002	1.96 m (6 ft 5 in)	(Mali) Real Bamako
C	11	Oumar Ballo	15 – 13 July 2002	2.08 m (6 ft 10 in)	(Spain) Canterbury Academy
G	12	Mohamed Keïta	17 – 16 June 2001	1.78 m (5 ft 10 in)	(Mali) Djoliba
F/C	13	Adama Sanogo	16 – 12 February 2002	2.01 m (6 ft 7 in)	(United States) Our Savior New American
F	14	N'Tio Diarra	15 – 30 October 2002	1.98 m (6 ft 6 in)	(Mali) Stade Malien
F	16	Moussa Diakité	16 – 8 June 2002	1.95 m (6 ft 5 in)	(Mali) Stade Malien
F	18	Ladji Dembelé	14 – 16 October 2003	2.03 m (6 ft 8 in)	(Mali) Stade Malien

Head coach

Mamoutou Kané

Assistant coach(es)

Ibrahim Cissé

=== Serbia ===
A 12-player squad was announced on 22 June 2018.

Serbia men's national under-17 basketball team roster
Players
Coaches

Pos.	No.	Name	Age – Date of birth	Height	Club
G	0	Vladan Musić	17 – 6 February 2001	1.91 m (6 ft 3 in)	(Serbia) Mega Bemax
F	2	Aleksej Pokuševski	16 – 26 December 2001	2.12 m (6 ft 11 in)	(Greece) Olympiacos
C	5	Marko Pavićević	17 – 8 May 2001	2.07 m (6 ft 9 in)	(Serbia) Crvena zvezda
G	6	Stevan Karapandžić	16 – 1 August 2001	1.91 m (6 ft 3 in)	(Serbia) Crvena zvezda
G	7	Đorđe Pažin	17 – 31 March 2001	2.00 m (6 ft 7 in)	(Serbia) Partizan
G	9	Lazar Živanović	17 – 19 January 2001	1.98 m (6 ft 6 in)	(Serbia) Crvena zvezda
G	10	Lazar Vasić	17 – 3 January 2001	1.86 m (6 ft 1 in)	(Serbia) Crvena zvezda
F	11	Aleksandar Langović	17 – 19 February 2001	2.05 m (6 ft 9 in)	(Serbia) Mega Bemax
F	13	Aleksa Marković	17 – 23 February 2001	1.98 m (6 ft 6 in)	(Serbia) Mega Bemax
C	14	Dušan Tanasković	17 – 23 February 2001	2.08 m (6 ft 10 in)	(Serbia) Partizan
F	15	Nemanja Popović	16 – 29 December 2001	2.04 m (6 ft 8 in)	(Serbia) Crvena zvezda
C	32	David Petrušev	16 – 27 September 2001	2.08 m (6 ft 10 in)	(United States) Montverde Academy

Head coach

Slobodan Klipa

Assistant coach(es)

Bojan Simanić

=== United States ===
A 12-player squad was announced on 21 June 2018.

United States men's national under-17 basketball team roster
Players
Coaches

Pos.	No.	Name	Age – Date of birth	Height	Club
F	4	Isaac Okoro	17 – 26 January 2001	1.98 m (6 ft 6 in)	(United States) McEachern HS
G	5	Jeremy Roach	16 – 1 November 2001	1.88 m (6 ft 2 in)	(United States) Paul VI HS
G	6	De'Vion Harmon	17 – 22 January 2001	1.85 m (6 ft 1 in)	(United States) John Guyer HS
G	7	Jalen Green	16 – 9 February 2002	1.96 m (6 ft 5 in)	(United States) San Joaquin Memorial HS
F	8	Romeo Weems	17 – 9 June 2001	2.01 m (6 ft 7 in)	(United States) New Haven HS
G	9	Jalen Suggs	17 – 3 June 2001	1.93 m (6 ft 4 in)	(United States) Minnehaha Academy
G	10	Roderick Hampton Jr.	17 – 7 February 2001	1.93 m (6 ft 4 in)	(United States) Little Rock Christian Academy
F	11	Scott Barnes Jr.	16 – 1 August 2001	2.03 m (6 ft 8 in)	(United States) University School
C	12	Evan Mobley	17 – 18 June 2001	2.11 m (6 ft 11 in)	(United States) Rancho Christian School
F	13	Wendell Moore Jr.	16 – 18 September 2001	1.96 m (6 ft 5 in)	(United States) Cox Mill HS
F/C	14	Isaiah Stewart II	17 – 22 May 2001	2.06 m (6 ft 9 in)	(United States) La Lumiere School
C	15	Vernon Carey Jr.	17 – 25 February 2001	2.08 m (6 ft 10 in)	(United States) University School

Head coach

Don Showalter

Assistant coach(es)

Scott Fitch
Stan Waterman

== Group C ==
=== Canada ===
A 12-player squad was announced on 21 June 2018.

Canada men's national under-17 basketball team roster
Players
Coaches

Pos.	No.	Name	Age – Date of birth	Height	Club
C	4	Tre-Vaughn Minott	17 – 22 April 2001	2.03 m (6 ft 8 in)	(Canada) Équipe du Québec
SG	5	Matthew-Alexander Moncrieffe	17 – 22 March 2001	2.01 m (6 ft 7 in)	(Canada) CIA Bounce
PG	6	Shemar Rathan-Mayes	16 – 17 July 2001	1.80 m (5 ft 11 in)	(Canada) CIA Bounce
SG	7	Luka Sakota	17 – 17 February 2001	1.93 m (6 ft 4 in)	Canada Élite
SF	8	Keon Ambrose-Hylton	16 – 21 September 2001	2.01 m (6 ft 7 in)	Nike UPlay Canada
F	9	Addison Patterson	17 – 9 June 2001	1.96 m (6 ft 5 in)	(Canada) CIA Bounce
F	10	Josh Hemmings	16 – 26 October 2001	2.03 m (6 ft 8 in)	Nike UPlay Canada
PG	11	Keeshawn Barthelemy	17 – 2 January 2001	1.85 m (6 ft 1 in)	(Canada) Brookwood Elite
F	12	Caleb Houstan	15 – 9 January 2003	2.03 m (6 ft 8 in)	(Canada) CIA Bounce
G	13	Cashius McNeilly	17 – 13 April 2001	1.91 m (6 ft 3 in)	Canada Élite
F	14	Benjamin Krikke	17 – 23 March 2001	2.03 m (6 ft 8 in)	(Canada) Équipe Alberta
C	15	Charles Bediako	16 – 10 March 2002	2.11 m (6 ft 11 in)	Nike UPlay Canada

Head coach

Kirby Schepp

Assistant coach(es)

Michael Meeks
Dan Vanhooren

=== Egypt ===
A 12-player squad was announced on 24 June 2018.

Egypt men's national under-17 basketball team roster
Players
Coaches

Pos.	No.	Name	Age – Date of birth	Height	Club
F	1	Youssef Lehitta	17 – 23 April 2001	1.96 m (6 ft 5 in)	(Egypt) Heliopolis
G	2	Youssef Helmy	17 – 20 June 2001	1.85 m (6 ft 1 in)	(Egypt) Sporting
F	5	Abdelrahman Mahmoud	16 – 1 September 2001	1.97 m (6 ft 6 in)	(Egypt) Sporting
G	7	Mazen Ibrahim	17 – 11 January 2001	1.84 m (6 ft 0 in)	(Egypt) Smouha
G	9	Omar Morsy	17 – 21 May 2001	1.88 m (6 ft 2 in)	(Egypt) Al Ahly
G	11	Yassin Mohamed	17 – 20 June 2001	1.83 m (6 ft 0 in)	(Egypt) Al Gezira
F	12	Ahmed Saed	17 – 1 January 2001	1.98 m (6 ft 6 in)	(Egypt) Al Ahly
F	13	Ahmed Hanafi	17 – 12 April 2001	1.93 m (6 ft 4 in)	(Egypt) Zamalek
C	14	Aly Khalifa	16 – 22 November 2001	2.06 m (6 ft 9 in)	(Egypt) Al Ahly
C	15	Mahmoud Noureldin	17 – 8 February 2001	2.04 m (6 ft 8 in)	(Egypt) Al Ahly
G	24	Momen Hassan	16 – 28 November 2001	1.88 m (6 ft 2 in)	(Egypt) Al Gezira
C	35	Youssef Elmadawy	17 – 7 February 2001	2.04 m (6 ft 8 in)	(Egypt) Smouha

Head coach

Fady Rezkalla

Assistant coach(es)

Ayman Matrawy
Ahmed Marei

=== Montenegro ===
A 12-player squad was announced on 29 June 2018.

Montenegro men's national under-17 basketball team roster
Players
Coaches

Pos.	No.	Name	Age – Date of birth	Height	Club
G	5	Feđa Pajović	17 – 7 February 2001	1.88 m (6 ft 2 in)	(Montenegro) Budućnost
F	7	Marko Kljajević	17 – 4 May 2001	2.01 m (6 ft 7 in)	(Serbia) Mega Bemax
F/C	8	Zdravko Okiljević	16 – 13 October 2001	2.02 m (6 ft 8 in)	(Montenegro) Sutjeska
G	9	Luka Živanović	16 – 25 August 2001	1.95 m (6 ft 5 in)	(Montenegro) Budućnost
F	10	Bojan Tomašević	17 – 20 June 2001	2.01 m (6 ft 7 in)	(Serbia) Crvena zvezda
G	11	Stefan Vlahović	17 – 9 January 2001	1.94 m (6 ft 4 in)	(Spain) Real Betis
G	12	Jovan Kljajić	16 – 11 September 2001	1.98 m (6 ft 6 in)	(Spain) Gran Canaria
G/F	13	Viktor Vujisić	17 – 6 March 2001	1.98 m (6 ft 6 in)	(Montenegro) Budućnost
G	14	Haris Karamanaga	17 – 1 May 2001	1.91 m (6 ft 3 in)	(Montenegro) Mornar Bar
F	15	Đorđije Marinović	17 – 10 March 2001	2.01 m (6 ft 7 in)	(Montenegro) Studentski centar
C	20	Nikola Bojičić	16 – 13 October 2001	2.04 m (6 ft 8 in)	Montenegro
F	21	Mileta Bošković	17 – 1 February 2001	1.98 m (6 ft 6 in)	(Montenegro) Centar

Head coach

Mladen Ostojić

Assistant coach(es)

Nenad Milošević
Bojan Nikolić

=== New Zealand ===
A 12-player squad was announced on 18 May 2018.

New Zealand men's national under-17 basketball team roster
Players
Coaches

Pos.	No.	Name	Age – Date of birth	Height	Club
G	0	Marvin Williams-Dunn	17 – 28 May 2001	1.84 m (6 ft 0 in)	(New Zealand) Auckland
G	1	Tom Cowie	17 – 5 March 2001	1.84 m (6 ft 0 in)	(New Zealand) Southland
G	5	Samuel Jenkins	16 – 3 April 2002	1.91 m (6 ft 3 in)	(New Zealand) Canterbury
G	6	Ezrah Vaigafa	16 – 16 February 2002	1.83 m (6 ft 0 in)	(New Zealand) Wellington
G	9	Kainoa Lepou	17 – 15 March 2001	1.91 m (6 ft 3 in)	(New Zealand) Waikato
F	10	Mitchell Dance	17 – 22 June 2001	1.92 m (6 ft 4 in)	(New Zealand) Harbour
G	11	Harrison Payne	16 – 2 January 2002	1.83 m (6 ft 0 in)	(New Zealand) Waitakere West
F	12	Jake McKinlay	17 – 6 April 2001	2.01 m (6 ft 7 in)	(New Zealand) Manawatu
C	13	Anzac Rissetto	17 – 24 January 2001	2.08 m (6 ft 10 in)	(New Zealand) Auckland
F	14	Shalom Broughton	16 – 27 September 2001	1.95 m (6 ft 5 in)	(New Zealand) Tauranga
F	16	Mac Stodard	16 – 16 February 2002	2.00 m (6 ft 7 in)	(New Zealand) Canterbury
F	26	Haven Dixon	16 – 13 October 2001	1.98 m (6 ft 6 in)	(New Zealand) Wellington

Head coach

David Bublitz

Assistant coach(es)

Christian Courtney
Aaron Young

== Group D ==
=== Argentina ===
A 12-player squad was announced on 26 June 2018.

Argentina men's national under-17 basketball team roster
Players
Coaches

Pos.	No.	Name	Age – Date of birth	Height	Club
G	4	Mateo Díaz	16 – 6 March 2002	1.86 m (6 ft 1 in)	(Argentina) Racing de Gualeguaychú
G	5	Ezequiel Paz	16 – 20 July 2001	1.90 m (6 ft 3 in)	(Argentina) Bahía Basket
F	6	Juan Scacchi	17 – 15 February 2001	1.86 m (6 ft 1 in)	(Argentina) Ciclista Paranaense
G	7	Agustín Cavallín	16 – 4 July 2001	1.88 m (6 ft 2 in)	(Argentina) Argentino de Junín
F	8	Ignacio Varisco	16 – 27 August 2001	2.02 m (6 ft 8 in)	(Argentina) Ferro Carril Oeste
F	9	Bautista Lugarini	17 – 31 January 2001	2.03 m (6 ft 8 in)	(Argentina) Bahía Basket
G	10	Gastón Bertona	16 – 13 July 2001	1.78 m (5 ft 10 in)	(Argentina) Obras Sanitarias
F/C	11	Tomás Chapero	17 – 10 June 2001	2.06 m (6 ft 9 in)	(Argentina) Bahía Basket
C	12	Gonzalo Bressan	16 – 16 November 2001	2.05 m (6 ft 9 in)	(Spain) CB Estepona
F	13	Máximo Milovich	17 – 17 April 2001	2.00 m (6 ft 7 in)	(Argentina) Obras Sanitarias
C	14	Juan Fernández	15 – 21 November 2002	2.06 m (6 ft 9 in)	(Argentina) Unión de Santa Fe
G	15	Federico Copes	16 – 18 June 2002	1.99 m (6 ft 6 in)	(Argentina) Los Indios de Moreno

Head coach

Diego Lifschitz

Assistant coach(es)

Pablo Romero
Esteban De la Fuente

=== Croatia ===
A 12-player squad was announced on 26 June 2018.

Croatia men's national under-17 basketball team roster
Players
Coaches

Pos.	No.	Name	Age – Date of birth	Height	Club
G	4	Filip Paponja	15 – 9 July 2002	1.84 m (6 ft 0 in)	(Croatia) Cibona
G	5	Roko Gizdavčić	17 – 12 March 2001	1.87 m (6 ft 2 in)	(Croatia) Split
F	6	Matej Rudan	17 – 21 March 2001	1.96 m (6 ft 5 in)	(Germany) Bayern Munich
G	7	Sandro Rašić	17 – 2 April 2001	1.95 m (6 ft 5 in)	(Croatia) Cibona
G	8	Ivan Gulin	16 – 9 November 2001	1.94 m (6 ft 4 in)	(Croatia) Šibenka
G	9	Lovro Gnjidić	17 – 18 April 2001	1.90 m (6 ft 3 in)	(Croatia) Cibona
F	10	Roko Škarica	17 – 13 March 2001	1.93 m (6 ft 4 in)	(Croatia) Cibona
F	11	Roko Prkačin	15 – 26 November 2002	2.00 m (6 ft 7 in)	(Croatia) Cibona
F	12	Žarko Parlov	17 – 3 March 2001	1.99 m (6 ft 6 in)	(Croatia) Cedevita
F	13	Ivan Perasović	16 – 23 April 2002	1.94 m (6 ft 4 in)	(Croatia) Split
C	14	Matej Bošnjak	16 – 8 January 2002	2.01 m (6 ft 7 in)	(Croatia) Cedevita
C	15	Viktor Šarić	17 – 12 February 2001	2.01 m (6 ft 7 in)	(Croatia) Split

Head coach

Damir Miljković

Assistant coach(es)

Dino Repeša

=== France ===
A 12-player squad was announced on 29 June 2018.

France men's national under-17 basketball team roster
Players
Coaches

Pos.	No.	Name	Age – Date of birth	Height	Club
G	0	Killian Hayes	16 – 27 July 2001	1.94 m (6 ft 4 in)	(France) Cholet Basket
G	1	Timothé Crusol	17 – 5 April 2001	1.92 m (6 ft 4 in)	(France) Centre Fédéral
F	2	Léo Billon	17 – 5 January 2001	1.98 m (6 ft 6 in)	(France) Cholet Basket
G	6	Théo Maledon	17 – 12 June 2001	1.91 m (6 ft 3 in)	(France) ASVEL Basket
G	7	Matthieu Gauzin	17 – 27 February 2001	1.90 m (6 ft 3 in)	(France) Le Mans Sarthe Basket
C	10	Samuel Eyango-Dingo	17 – 16 May 2001	2.06 m (6 ft 9 in)	(France) Nanterre 92
F	13	Essomé Miyem	16 – 15 July 2001	2.01 m (6 ft 7 in)	(France) SIG Strasbourg
G	17	Lorenzo Thirouard-Samson	17 – 19 February 2001	1.97 m (6 ft 6 in)	(France) Centre Fédéral
G	20	Malcolm Cazalon	16 – 27 August 2001	1.98 m (6 ft 6 in)	(France) ASVEL Basket
F	21	Victor Diallo	17 – 9 February 2001	2.01 m (6 ft 7 in)	(France) ASVEL Basket
F	29	Melvyn Ebonkoli	17 – 11 April 2001	1.98 m (6 ft 6 in)	(France) Le Mans Sarthe Basket
C	31	Maxime Carene	17 – 7 June 2001	2.08 m (6 ft 10 in)	(France) Centre Fédéral

Head coach

Nicolas Corbé

Assistant coach(es)

Lamine Kébé
Nicolas Absalon

=== Philippines ===
A 12-player squad was announced on 22 June 2018.

Philippines men's national under-17 basketball team roster
Players
Coaches

Pos.	No.	Name	Age – Date of birth	Height	Club
G	4	Forthsky Padrigao	16 – 11 March 2002	1.83 m (6 ft 0 in)	(Philippines) Ateneo Blue Eagles
G	6	Terrence Fortea	16 – 3 July 2001	1.80 m (5 ft 11 in)	(Philippines) NU Bullpups
G	7	Gerry Abadiano	17 – 8 March 2001	1.75 m (5 ft 9 in)	(Philippines) NU Bullpups
G	9	Mclaude Guadaña	17 – 29 April 2001	1.80 m (5 ft 11 in)	(Philippines) Lyceum Pirates
G	10	Jose Pascual	16 – 24 July 2001	1.80 m (5 ft 11 in)	(Philippines) DLSZ Green Archers
F	11	Recaredo Calimag	17 – 30 January 2001	1.85 m (6 ft 1 in)	(Philippines) LSGH Greenies
F	12	Yukien Andrada	17 – 21 April 2001	1.96 m (6 ft 5 in)	(Philippines) San Beda Red Cubs
F	15	Carl Tamayo	17 – 13 February 2001	2.01 m (6 ft 7 in)	(Philippines) NU Bullpups
F	16	Joshua Lazaro	16 – 11 June 2002	1.91 m (6 ft 3 in)	(Philippines) San Beda Red Cubs
C	17	Shaun Chiu	17 – 18 May 2001	2.03 m (6 ft 8 in)	(Philippines) Ateneo Blue Eagles
F	18	Raven Cortez	15 – 23 October 2002	2.01 m (6 ft 7 in)	(Philippines) DLSZ Green Archers
C	19	Kai Sotto	16 – 11 May 2002	2.16 m (7 ft 1 in)	(Philippines) Ateneo Blue Eagles

Head coach

Michael Oliver

Assistant coach(es)

Joshua Reyes
MC Abolucion
