= List of indoor arenas in Argentina =

The following is a list of indoor arenas in Argentina with a capacity of at least 3,000 spectators. Most of the arenas in this list have multiple uses such as individual sports, team sports as well as cultural events and political events.

== Current arenas ==
Images	Location	Venue	Opened	Capacity	Tenants/use
	Buenos Aires	Estadio Mary Terán de Weiss	2006 (fully covered in 2018)	15,500	Autonomous City of Buenos Aires
	Buenos Aires	Movistar Arena	2019	15,000	Anschutz Entertainment Group
	Córdoba	Orfeo Superdomo	2002	14,000	Dinosaurio Group
	Mendoza	Aconcagua Arena	2018	14,000	Mendoza Province
	Greater Buenos Aires	Arena Tecnópolis	2013	12,000	Government of Argentina
	La Rioja	Superdomo	2015	11,000	La Rioja Province
	Rosario	Estadio Claudio Newell	1978	10,000	Newell's Old Boys
	Buenos Aires	Luna Park	1932 (covered in 1934)	8,300	Sociedad Salesiana de San Juan Bosco y Cáritas Argentina
	San Juan	Estadio Aldo Cantoni	1967	8,000	San Juan Province, UPCN Vóley Club
	Mar del Plata	Polideportivo Islas Malvinas	1995	8,000	Club Atlético Peñarol
	Neuquen	Estadio Ruca Che	1995	8,000	Independiente de Neuquén, Gigantes del Sur
	Olavarría	Parque Carlos Guerrero	1982	6,070	Estudiantes de Olavarría
	Buenos Aires	Microestadio Malvinas Argentinas	2006	6,000	Argentinos Juniors
	Santa Fe	Estadio Ángel Malvicino	1998	6,000	Unión de Santa Fe
	Salta	Polideportivo Delmi	1986	6,000	Salta Province
	Rosario	Estadio Salvador Bonilla	1982	5,000	Club Atlético Provincial
	Formosa	Polideportivo Cincuentenario	2007	4,500	Formosa Province, Club La Unión
	Santiago del Estero	Estadio Ciudad de Santiago del Estero	1991	4,300	Quimsa
	Sunchales	Estadio Hogar de los Tigres	1998	4,200	Club Deportivo Libertad
	Greater Buenos Aires	Estadio Obras Sanitarias	1978	4,000	Obras Sanitarias
	Pilar	Microestadio Ricardo Rusticucci	2017	4,000	Pilar Municipality
	San Martín	Polideportivo Gustavo Rodríguez	2011	4,000	San Martín Municipality
	Rafaela	Coliseo del Sur	2002	4,000	Club Sportivo Ben Hur
	Bahía Blanca	Estadio Osvaldo Casanova	1932/1939	3,950	Estudiantes de Bahía Blanca
	Córdoba	Polideportivo Carlos Cerutti	1988	3,500	Asociación Deportiva Atenas
	Santa Fe	Estadio UTN Santa Fe	1982	3,500	Universidad Tecnológica Nacional
	Puerto General San Martín	Mega Estadio 4 de Junio	2021	3,500	Puerto General San Martín Municipality
	Puerto Madryn	Estadio Lujan Barrientos	2004	3,500	Club Social y Deportivo Madryn
	El Calafate	Microestadio El Calafate	2019	3,500	El Calafate Municipality
	Greater Buenos Aires	Polideportivo Almirante Brown	2003	3,000	Almirante Brown Partido
	La Plata	Polideportivo Víctor Nethol	1978	3,000	Gimnasia y Esgrima La Plata
	Resistencia	Microestadio Raul Alejo Gronda	1987	4,000	Club Atlético Sarmiento
	Presidencia Roque Sáenz Peña	Arena UNCAUS	2013	3,500	Universidad del Chaco Austral
	La Banda	Estadio Vicente Rosales	1980	3,500	Club Ciclista Olímpico La Banda
	San Miguel de Tucumán	Estadio Pedro Parra	1978	3,000	Sportivo Floresta
	Paraná	Estadio Luis Butta	1982	3,000	Atlético Echagüe
	Montecarlo	Polideportivo Montecarlo	2013	3,500	Montecarlo Municipality
	Posadas	Polideportivo El Zaimán	1983	3,000	Posadas Municipality

== Under construction ==
Images	Location	Venue	Capacity
	Comodoro Rivadavia	Estadio Centenario	10,000
	Río Grande	Microestadio Rio Grande	5,500
	Santa Rosa	Megaestadio Santa Rosa	5,000

== Under proposition ==
Images	Location	Venue	Capacity
	San Salvador de Jujuy	Microestadio Alto Comedero	6,000
	Río Gallegos	Microestadio ARA San Juan	5,000

== See also ==
- List of football stadiums in Argentina
- List of indoor arenas by capacity
- Lists of stadiums
