= 2018 FIBA Under-17 Basketball World Cup =

Tournament details
- Host country: Argentina
- Dates: 30 June – 8 July
- Teams: 16 (from 5 confederations)
- Venues: 3 (in 2 host cities)

Final positions
- Champions: United States (5th title)

Tournament statistics
- MVP: (United States) Jalen Green
- Top scorer: (Mali) Kanouté (24.6)
- Top rebounds: (Mali) Ballo (16.9)
- Top assists: (Puerto Rico) Curbelo (5.9)
- PPG (Team): United States (107.0)
- RPG (Team): United States (52.9)
- APG (Team): United States (22.4)

Official website
- www.fiba.basketball

The 2018 FIBA Under-17 Basketball World Cup (Spanish: Copa del Mundo de Baloncesto FIBA Sub-17 2018) was the 5th edition of the FIBA Under-17 Basketball World Cup, the biennial international men's youth basketball championship contested by the U17 national teams of the member associations of FIBA.

It was hosted by Rosario and Santa Fe, Argentina, from 30 June to 8 July 2018. The United States won their fifth title at the Under-17 World Cup, after defeating France in the final.

== Bids ==
The host was chosen in 2017 with it being decided to be held in Argentina over Bulgaria, which hosted in 2020, by beating out Israel.

- Argentina
- Bulgaria
- Israel

== Qualified teams ==
Means of Qualification	Date	Venue	Berths	Qualifiers
Host Nation	3 May 2017	Argentina	1	Argentina
2017 FIBA Under-16 Americas Championship	14 – 18 June 2017	(Argentina) Formosa	4	United States; Canada; Puerto Rico; Dominican Republic
2017 FIBA Under-16 African Championship	13 – 22 July 2017	(Mauritius) Vacoas-Phoenix	2	Mali; Egypt
2017 FIBA Under-16 European Championship	11 – 19 August 2017	(Montenegro) Podgorica	5	France; Montenegro; Serbia; Croatia; Turkey
2017 FIBA Under-16 Asian Championship	2 – 8 April 2018	(China) Foshan	4	Australia; China; New Zealand; Philippines
Total			16	

== Draw ==
The draw was held on 14 March 2018 in Rosario, Argentina.

== Preliminary round ==
All times are local (UTC–3).

=== Group A ===
Pos	Team	Pld	W	L	PF	PA	PD	Pts
1	Puerto Rico	3	2	1	226	205	+21	5 (Note: Puerto Rico 1–1, +6 PD; Australia 1–1, 0 PD; Turkey 1–1, –6 PD.)
2	Australia	3	2	1	220	218	+2	5
3	Turkey	3	2	1	244	217	+27	5
4	Dominican Republic	3	0	3	202	252	−50	3

Source: FIBA
Rules for classification: 1) Points; 2) Head-to-head results; 3) Points difference; 4) Points scored.
Notes:

30 June 2018
13:15

Boxscore

Australia	73–71	Dominican Republic
Scoring by quarter: 20–14, 14–30, 19–15, 20–12
Pts: Capetola 14; Rebs: Jackson 13; Asts: Jackson, Wigness 4		Pts: Montero 20; Rebs: Matos 9 Asts: Jones 4

Union Athletic Club, Santa Fe
Referees: Juan Fernández (ARG), Park Kyoung-jin (KOR), Vilius Mačiulaitis (LTU)

30 June 2018
15:30

Boxscore

Puerto Rico	76–68	Turkey
Scoring by quarter: 18–22, 19–17, 18–14, 21–15
Pts: Curbelo 20; Rebs: Miranda, Sosa 12; Asts: Curbelo 7		Pts: Erdek 18; Rebs: Haltalı 13; Asts: Ilyasoğlu 3

Union Athletic Club, Santa Fe
Referees: Carlos Peralta (ECU), Nathaniel Saunders (CAN), Goran Sljivic (AUT)

1 July 2018
13:15

Boxscore

Dominican Republic	69–84	Puerto Rico
Scoring by quarter: 14–21, 12–22, 22–24, 21–17
Pts: Jones 20; Rebs: Ferreras 10; Asts: Montero, Vázquez 3		Pts: Miranda 29; Rebs: Martínez, Romero 7 Asts: Miranda 5

Union Athletic Club, Santa Fe
Referees: Mauricio Chinchilla (CRC), Boris Krejič (SLO), Luis Castillo (ESP)

1 July 2018
15:30

Boxscore

Turkey	81–79	Australia
Scoring by quarter: 17–27, 19–15, 16–21, 29–16
Pts: Erdek 18; Rebs: Şengün 8 Asts: Kurtuldum 4		Pts: Jackson 16; Rebs: Jackson, Travers 11; Asts: Williamson 4

Union Athletic Club, Santa Fe
Referees: Carlos Peralta (ECU), Luka Kardum (CRO), Danilo Molina (ARG)

3 July 2018
13:15

Boxscore

Australia	68–66	Puerto Rico
Scoring by quarter: 21–17, 19–20, 13–19, 15–10
Pts: Travers 15; Rebs: Jackson 15; Asts: Capetola 4		Pts: Miranda 20; Rebs: Miranda, San Antonio 6 Asts: Curbelo 3

Union Athletic Club, Santa Fe
Referees: Carlos Peralta (ECU), Nathaniel Saunders (CAN), Boris Krejič (SLO)

3 July 2018
15:30

Boxscore

Turkey	95–62	Dominican Republic
Scoring by quarter: 16–16, 27–7, 27–23, 25–16
Pts: Kurtuldum 31; Rebs: Şengün 14; Asts: Küçük 5		Pts: Berroa 13; Rebs: Jones 8 Asts: Berroa, Reyes 2

Union Athletic Club, Santa Fe
Referees: Juan Fernández (ARG), Vilius Mačiulaitis (LTU), Luka Kardum (CRO)

=== Group B ===
Pos	Team	Pld	W	L	PF	PA	PD	Pts
1	United States	3	3	0	305	138	+167	6
2	Serbia	3	2	1	223	231	−8	5
3	Mali	3	1	2	200	257	−57	4
4	China	3	0	3	169	271	−102	3

Source: FIBA
Rules for classification: 1) Points; 2) Head-to-head results; 3) Points difference; 4) Points scored.

30 June 2018
17:45

Boxscore

Mali	77–89	Serbia
Scoring by quarter: 23–26, 19–16, 24–28, 11–19
Pts: Kanouté 37; Rebs: Ballo 11; Asts: Coulibaly, Kanouté 5		Pts: Pažin 29; Rebs: Pokuševski 10; Asts: Karapandžić 6

Union Athletic Club, Santa Fe
Referees: Boris Krejič (SLO), Leong Chuen Wing (SIN), Mauricio Chinchilla (CRC)

30 June 2018
20:00

Boxscore

China	37–115	United States
Scoring by quarter: 5–33, 17–29, 6–24, 9–29
Pts: Jiao 13; Rebs: Jiao 13; Asts: three players 1		Pts: Harmon 17; Rebs: Stewart 10; Asts: Suggs 5

Union Athletic Club, Santa Fe
Referees: Luis Castillo (ESP), Luka Kardum (CRO), Danilo Molina (ARG)

1 July 2018
17:45

Boxscore

United States	97–40	Mali
Scoring by quarter: 21–6, 31–15, 22–9, 23–10
Pts: Green 15; Rebs: Mobley 9 Asts: Roach 6		Pts: Kanouté 15; Rebs: Ballo 10; Asts: Ballo 3

Union Athletic Club, Santa Fe
Referees: Juan Fernández (ARG), Leong Chuen Wing (SIN), Park Kyoung-jin (KOR)

1 July 2018
20:00

Boxscore

Serbia	73–61	China
Scoring by quarter: 20–9, 19–21, 15–17, 19–14
Pts: Pažin 18; Rebs: Pokuševski 10; Asts: Karapandžić 5		Pts: Jiao 22; Rebs: Jiao 8 Asts: Sun 4

Union Athletic Club, Santa Fe
Referees: Vilius Mačiulaitis (LTU), Nathaniel Saunders (CAN), Goran Sljivic (AUT)

3 July 2018
17:45

Boxscore

Mali	83–71	China
Scoring by quarter: 21–8, 21–16, 20–25, 21–22
Pts: Ballo, Kanouté 26; Rebs: Ballo 19; Asts: Traore 7		Pts: Sun 25; Rebs: Jiao 11; Asts: Jiao 5

Union Athletic Club, Santa Fe
Referees: Mauricio Chinchilla (CRC), Leong Chuen Wing (SIN), Goran Sljivic (AUT)

3 July 2018
20:00

Boxscore

United States	93–61	Serbia
Scoring by quarter: 23–12, 24–16, 22–19, 24–14
Pts: Carey 16; Rebs: Stewart 11; Asts: Harmon 4		Pts: Langović 15; Rebs: Tanasković 6 Asts: Karapandžić 3

Union Athletic Club, Santa Fe
Referees: Luis Castillo (ESP), Park Kyoung-jin (KOR), Danilo Molina (ARG)

=== Group C ===
Pos	Team	Pld	W	L	PF	PA	PD	Pts
1	Canada	3	3	0	282	181	+101	6
2	Montenegro	3	2	1	224	215	+9	5
3	Egypt	3	1	2	184	220	−36	4
4	New Zealand	3	0	3	167	241	−74	3

Source: FIBA
Rules for classification: 1) Points; 2) Head-to-head results; 3) Points difference; 4) Points scored.

30 June 2018
13:00

Boxscore

New Zealand	50–64	Egypt
Scoring by quarter: 11–14, 8–19, 21–13, 10–18
Pts: Lepou 13; Rebs: Broughton 15; Asts: McKinlay, Williams-Dunn 2		Pts: Hassan 14; Rebs: El-Madawy 11; Asts: El-Madawy 3

Newell's Old Boys, Rosario
Referees: Uroš Nikolić (SRB), Mohammadreza Salehian (IRN), Alexis Mercado (PUR)

30 June 2018
15:15

Boxscore

Canada	92–67	Montenegro
Scoring by quarter: 15–15, 23–14, 20–20, 34–18
Pts: Patterson 20; Rebs: Krikke 6 Asts: Three players 3		Pts: Kljajić 17; Rebs: Bošković, Marinović 6 Asts: Vlahović 4

Newell's Old Boys, Rosario
Attendance: 700
Referees: Jonathan Sterling (USA), Martin Horozov (BUL), Ville Selkee (FIN)

1 July 2018
13:45

Boxscore

Egypt	53–93	Canada
Scoring by quarter: 16–25, 8–26, 18–21, 11–21
Pts: Khalifa 16; Rebs: Khalifa 13; Asts: Mahmoud 4		Pts: McNeilly, Patterson 16; Rebs: Moncrieffe 14; Asts: Houstan, Moncrieffe 3

Newell's Old Boys, Rosario
Referees: Wojciech Liszka (POL), Martin Horozov (BUL), Jonathon Chapman (AUS)

1 July 2018
16:00

Boxscore

Montenegro	80–56	New Zealand
Scoring by quarter: 27–11, 11–14, 21–12, 21–19
Pts: Kljajić 22; Rebs: Marinović 10; Asts: Živanović, Kljajić 5		Pts: Dance 14; Rebs: Rissetto 9 Asts: Williams-Dunn 4

Newell's Old Boys, Rosario
Referees: Mārtiņš Kozlovskis (LAT), Mohammadreza Salehian (IRN), Felipe Ibarra (CHI)

3 July 2018
13:45

Boxscore

Canada	97–61	New Zealand
Scoring by quarter: 26–12, 18–16, 22–21, 31–12
Pts: Moncrieffe 16; Rebs: Krikke, Moncrieffe 7 Asts: Rathan-Mayes 10		Pts: Dance 13; Rebs: Rissetto 9 Asts: Williams-Dunn 3

Newell's Old Boys, Rosario
Attendance: 200
Referees: Uroš Nikolić (SRB), Amir Taboubi (TUN), Felipe Ibarra (CHI)

3 July 2018
16:00

Boxscore

Egypt	67–77 (OT)	Montenegro
Scoring by quarter: 4–11, 31–15, 19–17, 10–21, Overtime: 3–13
Pts: El-Madawy 23; Rebs: El-Madawy 15; Asts: El-Madawy, Mahmoud 2		Pts: Tomašević 18; Rebs: Marinović 11; Asts: Kljajić 7

Newell's Old Boys, Rosario
Attendance: 400
Referees: Alexis Mercado (PUR), Jonathon Chapman (AUS), Gytis Vilius (LTU)

=== Group D ===
Pos	Team	Pld	W	L	PF	PA	PD	Pts
1	France	3	3	0	256	155	+101	6
2	Croatia	3	2	1	222	209	+13	5
3	Argentina (H)	3	1	2	179	227	−48	4
4	Philippines	3	0	3	200	266	−66	3

Source: FIBA
Rules for classification: 1) Points; 2) Head-to-head results; 3) Points difference; 4) Points scored.
(H) Hosts

30 June 2018
17:30

Boxscore

Croatia	97–75	Philippines
Scoring by quarter: 25–15, 19–16, 27–18, 26–26
Pts: Bošnjak 14; Rebs: Prkačin 7 Asts: Gizdavčić 7		Pts: Sotto 23; Rebs: Sotto 12; Asts: Padrigao 3

Newell's Old Boys, Rosario
Referees: Felipe Ibarra (CHI), Amir Taboubi (TUN), Gytis Vilius (LTU)

30 June 2018
20:30

Boxscore

France	82–50	Argentina
Scoring by quarter: 19–12, 25–6, 18–21, 20–11
Pts: Cazalon 19; Rebs: Maledon 8 Asts: Crusol 4		Pts: Fernández 10; Rebs: Milovich 6 Asts: Díaz 3

Newell's Old Boys, Rosario
Referees: Wojciech Liszka (POL), Jonathon Chapman (AUS), Mārtiņš Kozlovskis (LAT)

1 July 2018
18:15

Boxscore

Philippines	54–95	France
Scoring by quarter: 17–17, 15–21, 13–35, 9–22
Pts: Tamayo 17; Rebs: Tamayo 10; Asts: Three players 2		Pts: Cazalon 18; Rebs: Thirouard-Samson 8 Asts: Crusol, Maledon 2

Newell's Old Boys, Rosario
Referees: Uroš Nikolić (SRB), Amir Taboubi (TUN), Ville Selkee (FIN)

1 July 2018
20:30

Boxscore

Argentina	55–74	Croatia
Scoring by quarter: 17–20, 15–16, 8–17, 15–21
Pts: Díaz 16; Rebs: Paz 7 Asts: Paz 3		Pts: Rudan 24; Rebs: Rudan 12; Asts: Perasović, Prkačin 3

Newell's Old Boys, Rosario
Referees: Jonathan Sterling (USA), Alexis Mercado (PUR), Gytis Vilius (LTU)

3 July 2018
18:15

Boxscore

Croatia	51–79	France
Scoring by quarter: 13–22, 17–17, 16–19, 5–21
Pts: Gulin 11; Rebs: Gizdavčić, Perasović 7 Asts: Perasović 3		Pts: Cazalon 17; Rebs: Cazalon 8 Asts: Hayes 9

Newell's Old Boys, Rosario
Attendance: 1,500
Referees: Jonathan Sterling (USA), Mohammadreza Salehian (IRN), Martin Horozov (BUL)

3 July 2018
20:30

Boxscore

Argentina	74–71	Philippines
Scoring by quarter: 20–13, 16–19, 22–24, 16–15
Pts: Fernández 15; Rebs: Fernández 12; Asts: Bertona, Díaz 4		Pts: Abadiano, Fortea 17; Rebs: Sotto 15; Asts: Fortea 4

Newell's Old Boys, Rosario
Referees: Wojciech Liszka (POL), Mārtiņš Kozlovskis (LAT), Ville Selkee (FIN)

== Final round ==
Round of 16
4 July
Puerto Rico	81
China	64
4 July
Montenegro	73
Argentina	60
4 July
Turkey	87
Serbia	68
4 July
New Zealand	48
France	88
4 July
Australia	74
Mali	65
4 July
Canada	102
Philippines	62
4 July
Dominican Republic	60
United States	103
4 July
Egypt	55
Croatia	68

Quarterfinals
6 July
Puerto Rico	75
Montenegro	60
6 July
Turkey	70
France	86
6 July
Australia	70
Canada	74
6 July
United States	126
Croatia	52

Semifinals
7 July
Puerto Rico	73
France	78
7 July
Canada	71
United States	120

Final
8 July
France	52
United States	95
Third place
8 July
Puerto Rico	90
Canada	77

=== Round of 16 ===
4 July 2018
13:15

Boxscore

Australia	74–65	Mali
Scoring by quarter: 15–19, 19–11, 14–17, 26–18
Pts: Jackson, Travers 15; Rebs: Jackson 14; Asts: Travers 5		Pts: Ballo 20; Rebs: Ballo 15; Asts: Kanouté 5

Union Athletic Club, Santa Fe
Referees: Vilius Mačiulaitis (LTU), Leong Chuen Wing (SIN), Luka Kardum (CRO)

4 July 2018
13:45

Boxscore

New Zealand	48–88	France
Scoring by quarter: 15–24, 14–23, 13–21, 6–20
Pts: Lepou 11; Rebs: Rissetto 8 Asts: Williams-Dunn 3		Pts: Hayes 17; Rebs: Maledon 8 Asts: Maledon 6

Newell's Old Boys, Rosario
Attendance: 500
Referees: Felipe Ibarra (CHI), Amir Taboubi (TUN), Ville Selkee (FIN)

4 July 2018
15:30

Boxscore

Turkey	87–68	Serbia
Scoring by quarter: 12–26, 23–10, 28–13, 24–19
Pts: Şengün 22; Rebs: Şengün 15; Asts: İlyasoğlu 10		Pts: Langović 18; Rebs: Langović 13; Asts: Karapandžić 6

Union Athletic Club, Santa Fe
Referees: Juan Fernández (ARG), Boris Krejič (SLO), Mauricio Chinchilla (CRC)

4 July 2018
16:00

Boxscore

Canada	102–62	Philippines
Scoring by quarter: 26–7, 25–19, 26–20, 25–16
Pts: Moncrieffe 22; Rebs: Moncrieffe 11; Asts: McNeilly 6		Pts: Abadiano 19; Rebs: Sotto 8 Asts: Sotto 4

Newell's Old Boys, Rosario
Attendance: 500
Referees: Alexis Mercado (PUR), Mohammadreza Salehian (IRN), Martin Horozov (BUL)

4 July 2018
17:45

Boxscore

Dominican Republic	60–103	United States
Scoring by quarter: 18–24, 13–30, 12–22, 17–27
Pts: Ferreras 19; Rebs: Jones 6 Asts: three players 2		Pts: Roach 14; Rebs: Stewart 10; Asts: Suggs 5

Union Athletic Club, Santa Fe
Referees: Carlos Peralta (ECU), Park Kyoung-jin (KOR), Danilo Molina (ARG)

4 July 2018
18:15

Boxscore

Egypt	55–68	Croatia
Scoring by quarter: 11–20, 18–14, 12–14, 14–20
Pts: El-Madawy 17; Rebs: El-Madawy 13; Asts: Morsy, El-Madawy 3		Pts: Perasović 22; Rebs: Bošnjak 10; Asts: Rudan 5

Newell's Old Boys, Rosario
Referees: Mārtiņš Kozlovskis (LAT), Jonathon Chapman (AUS), Uroš Nikolić (SRB)

4 July 2018
20:00

Boxscore

Puerto Rico	81–64	China
Scoring by quarter: 25–17, 17–13, 16–20, 23–14
Pts: Curbelo, Rosa 18; Rebs: Sosa 16; Asts: Curbelo 12		Pts: Sun 24; Rebs: Sun 7 Asts: Sun, Yang 4

Union Athletic Club, Santa Fe
Referees: Luis Castillo (ESP), Nathaniel Saunders (CAN), Goran Sljivic (AUT)

4 July 2018
20:30

Boxscore

Montenegro	73–60	Argentina
Scoring by quarter: 16–14, 14–17, 17–20, 26–9
Pts: Kljajić 23; Rebs: Kljajić 16; Asts: Kljajić, Živanović 2		Pts: Bertona, Paz 14; Rebs: Fernández 11; Asts: Bertona, Paz 3

Newell's Old Boys, Rosario
Referees: Jonathan Sterling (USA), Wojciech Liszka (POL), Gytis Vilius (LTU)

=== 9–16th classification playoffs ===
Classification quarterfinals
6 July
China	69
Argentina	95
6 July
Serbia	78
New Zealand	51
6 July
Mali	95
Philippines	59
6 July
Dominican Republic	67
Egypt	65

Classification semifinals
7 July
Argentina	54
Serbia	74
7 July
Mali	108
Dominican Republic (OT)	110

Ninth place match
8 July
Serbia	77
Dominican Republic	82
Eleventh place match
8 July
Argentina	70
Mali	69

Classification semifinals
7 July
China	57
New Zealand	62
7 July
Philippines	70
Egypt	69

13th place match
8 July
New Zealand	51
Philippines	73
15th place match
8 July
China	68
Egypt	63

==== 9–16th place quarterfinals ====
6 July 2018
12:00

Boxscore

Serbia	78–51	New Zealand
Scoring by quarter: 12–10, 20–13, 18–16, 28–12
Pts: Pažin 22; Rebs: Langović 12; Asts: Vasić 5		Pts: Dance 30; Rebs: Rissetto 7 Asts: Williams-Dunn 2

Universidad Tecnológica Nacional, Santa Fe
Referees: Alexis Mercado (PUR), Amir Taboubi (TUN), Martin Horozov (BUL)

6 July 2018
14:15

Boxscore

Mali	95–59	Philippines
Scoring by quarter: 14–15, 29–17, 18–12, 34–15
Pts: Ballo 28; Rebs: Ballo 19; Asts: Kanouté 7		Pts: Andrada, Cortez 10; Rebs: Sotto 6 Asts: Fortea 6

Universidad Tecnológica Nacional, Santa Fe
Referees: Luis Castillo (ESP), Luka Kardum (CRO), Danilo Molina (ARG)

6 July 2018
16:30

Boxscore

Dominican Republic	67–65	Egypt
Scoring by quarter: 19–19, 17–18, 15–12, 16–16
Pts: Jones 23; Rebs: Jones 12; Asts: Matos 5		Pts: Khalfia 17; Rebs: El-Madawy 19; Asts: Morsy 7

Universidad Tecnológica Nacional, Santa Fe
Attendance: 300
Referees: Mauricio Chinchilla (PUR), Leong Chuen Wing (SIN), Park Kyoung-jin (KOR)

6 July 2018
18:45

Boxscore

China	69–95	Argentina
Scoring by quarter: 15–25, 13–29, 25–15, 16–26
Pts: Jiao 21; Rebs: Jiao 14; Asts: Chen 5		Pts: Fernández 21; Rebs: Fernández 12; Asts: Paz 7

Universidad Tecnológica Nacional, Santa Fe
Attendance: 700
Referees: Boris Krejič (SLO), Ville Selkee (FIN), Gytis Vilius (LTU)

==== 13–16th place semifinals ====
7 July 2018
13:15

Boxscore

China	57–62	New Zealand
Scoring by quarter: 8–17, 17–18, 18–16, 14–11
Pts: Zhao 14; Rebs: Sun 7 Asts: Yang 4		Pts: Dance 23; Rebs: Broughton 9 Asts: Dance, Williams-Dunn 4

Universidad Tecnológica Nacional, Santa Fe
Referees: Vilius Mačiulaitis (LTU), Mauricio Chinchilla (CRC), Danilo Molina (ARG)

7 July 2018
15:30

Boxscore

Philippines	70–69	Egypt
Scoring by quarter: 17–8, 24–18, 14–24, 15–19
Pts: Sotto 28; Rebs: Sotto 17; Asts: Calimag 5		Pts: Khalfia 17; Rebs: El-Madawy 10; Asts: Ibrahim 3

Universidad Tecnológica Nacional, Santa Fe
Attendance: 300
Referees: Jonathan Sterling (USA), Leong Chuen Wing (SIN), Goran Sljivic (AUT)

==== 15th place game ====
8 July 2018
11:00

Boxscore

China	68–63	Egypt
Scoring by quarter: 15–18, 11–11, 17-12, 25-22
Pts: Sun 30; Rebs: Saimaiti 8 Asts: Saimaiti 8		Pts: Khalifa 20; Rebs: Khalifa 9 Asts: El-Madawy 6

Universidad Tecnológica Nacional, Santa Fe
Referees: Mauricio Chinchilla (CRC), Fabiano Huber (BRA), Danilo Molina (ARG)

==== 13th place game ====
8 July 2018
13:15

Boxscore

New Zealand	51–73	Philippines
Scoring by quarter: 12–16, 12–19, 12–19, 15–19
Pts: Dance 12; Rebs: Rissetto 12; Asts: Vaigafa, Williams-Dunn 2		Pts: Sotto 22; Rebs: Sotto 10; Asts: Padrigao 9

Universidad Tecnológica Nacional, Santa Fe
Referees: Martin Horozov (BUL), Leong Chuen Wing (SIN), Mohammadreza Salehian (IRN)

==== 9–12th place semifinals ====
7 July 2018
11:00

Boxscore

Mali	108–110 (3OT)	Dominican Republic
Scoring by quarter: 19–23, 19–17, 24–19, 17–20, Overtime: 7–7, 9–9, 13–15
Pts: Ballo 32; Rebs: Ballo 32; Asts: Coulibaly 5		Pts: Jones 39; Rebs: Jones 15; Asts: Montero 7

Universidad Tecnológica Nacional, Santa Fe
Referees: Nathaniel Saunders (CAN), Amir Taboubi (TUN), Ville Selkee (FIN)

7 July 2018
17:45

Boxscore

Argentina	54–74	Serbia
Scoring by quarter: 7–21, 20–17, 9–15, 18–21
Pts: Cavallín 14; Rebs: Bertona, Fernández 6 Asts: Paz 3		Pts: Langović, Pažin 11; Rebs: Pokuševski 10; Asts: three players 3

Universidad Tecnológica Nacional, Santa Fe
Attendance: 1,000
Referees: Wojciech Liszka (POL), Mohammadreza Salehian (IRN), Carlos Peralta (ECU)

==== Eleventh place game ====
8 July 2018
15:30

Boxscore

Argentina	70–69	Mali
Scoring by quarter: 26–12, 10–15, 17–18, 17–24
Pts: Cavallín 18; Rebs: Milovich 13; Asts: Fernández 5		Pts: Kanouté 24; Rebs: Sidibe 14; Asts: Ballo 3

Union Athletic Club, Santa Fe
Referees: Boris Krejič (SLO), Alexis Mercado (PUR), Uroš Nikolić (SRB)

==== Ninth place game ====
8 July 2018
15:30

Boxscore

Serbia	77–82	Dominican Republic
Scoring by quarter: 18–20, 21–18, 27–24, 11–20
Pts: Marković 23; Rebs: Pokuševski 14; Asts: Karapandžić 5		Pts: Jones 24; Rebs: Jones 13; Asts: Ferreras 4

Universidad Tecnológica Nacional, Santa Fe
Attendance: 200
Referees: Felipe Ibarra (CHI), Park Kyoung-jin (KOR), Goran Sljivic (AUT)

=== Quarterfinals ===
6 July 2018
13:00

Boxscore

Australia	70–74	Canada
Scoring by quarter: 15–21, 15–11, 15–18, 25–24
Pts: Travers 20; Rebs: Jackson 20; Asts: Wigness 4		Pts: Patterson 18; Rebs: Hemmings 7 Asts: Barthelemy 5

Union Athletic Club, Santa Fe
Referees: Wojciech Liszka (POL), Felipe Ibarra (CHI), Uroš Nikolić (SRB)

6 July 2018
15:30

Boxscore

Turkey	70–86	France
Scoring by quarter: 13–22, 19–16, 21–24, 17–24
Pts: Şengün 26; Rebs: Şengün 17; Asts: Ilyasoğlu 3		Pts: Cazalon 30; Rebs: Cazalon 8 Asts: Maledon 7

Union Athletic Club, Santa Fe
Referees: Jonathan Sterling (USA), Nathaniel Saunders (CAN), Goran Sljivic (AUT)

6 July 2018
18:00

Boxscore

Puerto Rico	75–60	Montenegro
Scoring by quarter: 19–16, 17–15, 25–16, 14–13
Pts: San Antonio 30; Rebs: Curbelo 8 Asts: Curbelo 8		Pts: Kljajić, Tomašević 10; Rebs: Tomašević 10; Asts: Kljajić 5

Union Athletic Club, Santa Fe
Referees: Mārtiņš Kozlovskis (LAT), Jonathon Chapman (AUS), Carlos Peralta (ECU)

6 July 2018
20:30

Boxscore

United States	126–52	Croatia
Scoring by quarter: 24–12, 39–10, 25–11, 38–19
Pts: Green 27; Rebs: Weems 13; Asts: Harmon 5		Pts: Gulin 16; Rebs: Prkačin 6 Asts: Gizdavčić 5

Union Athletic Club, Santa Fe
Referees: Juan Fernández (ARG), Mohammadreza Salehian (IRN), Vilius Mačiulaitis (LTU)

=== 5–8th classification playoffs ===
Classification semifinals
7 July
Montenegro	65
Turkey	101
7 July
Australia	71
Croatia	54

Fifth place match
8 July
Turkey	81
Australia	77
Seventh place match
8 July
Montenegro	66
Croatia	74

==== 5–8th place semifinals ====
7 July 2018
13:00

Boxscore

Montenegro	65–101	Turkey
Scoring by quarter: 17–31, 11–24, 16–22, 21–24
Pts: Tomašević 31; Rebs: Bošković 7 Asts: Kljajić 5		Pts: Kurtuldum 28; Rebs: Şengün 13; Asts: Ilyasoğlu 8

Union Athletic Club, Santa Fe
Referees: Alexis Mercado (PUR), Juan Fernández (ARG), Jonathon Chapman (AUS)

7 July 2018
15:30

Boxscore

Australia	71–54	Croatia
Scoring by quarter: 13–10, 13–12, 20–24, 25–8
Pts: Clarke 18; Rebs: Jackson 15; Asts: Capetola, Travers 4		Pts: Rudan 20; Rebs: Prkačin 10; Asts: Rudan 5

Union Athletic Club, Santa Fe
Referees: Mārtiņš Kozlovskis (LAT), Park Kyoung-jin (KOR), Martin Horozov (BUL)

==== Seventh place game ====
8 July 2018
17:45

Boxscore

Montenegro	66–74	Croatia
Scoring by quarter: 16–15, 20–16, 13–30, 17–13
Pts: Tomašević 22; Rebs: Tomašević 10; Asts: Kljajić 5		Pts: Prkačin 21; Rebs: Bošnjak, Perasović 12; Asts: Bošnjak 4

Universidad Tecnológica Nacional, Santa Fe
Attendance: 300
Referees: Luis Castillo (ESP), Amir Taboubi (TUN), Vilius Mačiulaitis (LTU)

==== Fifth place game ====
8 July 2018
13:00

Boxscore

Turkey	81–77	Australia
Scoring by quarter: 17–18, 18–20, 18–15, 28–24
Pts: Kurtuldum 20; Rebs: Şengün 10; Asts: Kurtuldum 4		Pts: Jackson, Wigness 18; Rebs: Travers 10; Asts: three players 4

Union Athletic Club, Santa Fe
Referees: Luka Kardum (CRO), Nathaniel Saunders (CAN), Ville Selkee (FIN)

=== Semifinals ===
7 July 2018
18:00

Boxscore

Puerto Rico	73–78	France
Scoring by quarter: 18–21, 17–27, 15–16, 23–14
Pts: Curbelo, Miranda 14; Rebs: San Antonio 8 Asts: Curbelo, San Antonio 4		Pts: Cazalon, Hayes 20; Rebs: Miyem 7 Asts: Maledon 6

Union Athletic Club, Santa Fe
Attendance: 2,500
Referees: Boris Krejič (SLO), Felipe Ibarra (CHI), Gytis Vilius (LTU)

7 July 2018
20:30

Boxscore

Canada	71–120	United States
Scoring by quarter: 28–21, 14–33, 13–29, 16–37
Pts: Patterson 15; Rebs: three players 6 Asts: Sakota 4		Pts: Green 25; Rebs: Weems 9 Asts: Harmon 5

Union Athletic Club, Santa Fe
Referees: Luis Castillo (ESP), Luka Kardum (CRO), Uroš Nikolić (SRB)

=== Third place game ===
8 July 2018
18:00

Boxscore

Puerto Rico	90–77	Canada
Scoring by quarter: 20–20, 20–17, 17–12, 33–28
Pts: Miranda 24; Rebs: Miranda 11; Asts: Curbelo 5		Pts: Patterson 31; Rebs: Hemmings 8 Asts: Barthélémy 4

Union Athletic Club, Santa Fe
Referees: Wojciech Liszka (POL), Juan Fernández (ARG), Jonathon Chapman (AUS)

=== Final ===
8 July 2018
20:30

Boxscore

France	52–95	United States
Scoring by quarter: 14–23, 11–22, 14–32, 13–18
Pts: Hayes 10; Rebs: Maledon 5 Asts: Maledon 4		Pts: Stewart 15; Rebs: three players 9 Asts: Barnes, Okoro 3

Union Athletic Club, Santa Fe
Referees: Mārtiņš Kozlovskis (LAT), Carlos Peralta (ECU), Gytis Vilius (LTU)

== Final standings ==
Rank	Team	Record
1st place, gold medalist(s)	United States	7–0
2nd place, silver medalist(s)	France	6–1
3rd place, bronze medalist(s)	Puerto Rico	5–2
4th	Canada	5–2
5th	Turkey	5–2
6th	Australia	4–3
7th	Croatia	4–3
8th	Montenegro	3–4
9th	Dominican Republic	3–4
10th	Serbia	4–3
11th	Argentina	3–4
12th	Mali	2–5
13th	Philippines	2–5
14th	New Zealand	1–6
15th	China	1–6
16th	Egypt	1–6

== Statistics and awards ==
=== Statistical leaders ===
Points

Name	PPG
(Mali) Siriman Kanouté	24.6
(Mali) Oumar Ballo	20.6
(Dominican Republic) David Jones	19.7
(Montenegro) Bojan Tomašević	19.1
(Turkey) Mustafa Kurtuldum	18.1

Rebounds

Name	RPG
(Mali) Oumar Ballo	16.9
(Australia) Luke Jackson	13.7
(Turkey) Alperen Şengün	12.3
(Egypt) Youssef El-Madawy	12.1
(Philippines) Kai Sotto	10.6

Assists

Name	APG
(Puerto Rico) Andre Curbelo	5.9
(Serbia) Stevan Karapandžić	4.6
(Turkey) Ömercan İlyasoğlu	4.4
(Montenegro) Jovan Kljajić	4.3
(France) Théo Maledon	4.1

Blocks

Name	BPG
(Serbia) Aleksej Pokuševski	3.0
(United States) Evan Mobley	2.6
(Dominican Republic) Enmanuel Ferreras	2.3
(Philippines) Kai Sotto	2.3
(Egypt) Aly Khalfia	2.0

Steals

Name	SPG
(Dominican Republic) Jean Montero	4.1
(Dominican Republic) David Jones	3.9
(Mali) Siriman Kanouté	3.9
(United States) Jalen Suggs	3.3
(Australia) Tamuri Wigness	3.0
(France) Malcolm Cazalon	3.0

=== Awards ===
2018 FIBA Under-17 Basketball World Cup winner

United States
5th title

Most Valuable Player
(United States) Jalen Green

All-Tournament Team

- (Puerto Rico) André Curbelo
- (France) Killian Hayes
- (United States) Jalen Green
- (United States) Vernon Carey Jr.
- (Mali) Oumar Ballo

== Marketing ==
The logo and brand identity of the 2018 FIBA Under-17 Basketball World Cup was unveiled during the Argentina-Uruguay 2019 FIBA Basketball World Cup Americas qualifier match held in 23 February 2018 in Olavarría. The logo design was inspired from the Flag of Argentina. The ball represents the sun of the flag while the hands depicted contesting a tip off was derived from the two blue bands of the flag. The hands are meant to evoke a "sense of a journey unfolding". The brand identity used for the tournament had its sun as its primary symbol which is meant to symbolize the "new stars that will rise and shine" in the tournament.
