= Valery Korolyov =

Soviet basketball player

Medal record
Silver medal – second place	1990 Argentina	USSR

Valery Nikolayevich Korolyov (Russian: Валерий Николаевич Королёв; born 1965, Leningrad) is a Soviet basketball. Centerline. Height - 212 cm

== Career ==
He played for the BC Spartak Leningrad, BC Budivelnyk (1990–1992), St. Pölten (Austria) (1994–1999, 2000–2003), Wienna (Austria) (1999–2000).

== Soviet Union national team ==
Silver medalist at the 1990 World Cup.

== Family ==
Married to Tatyana Gromyko, has a son Dmitry (born 1985).
