= Estadio Centenario (disambiguation) =

Estadio Centenario is a stadium in Montevideo, Uruguay.

Estadio Centenario may also refer to:

- Estadio Centenario (Comodoro Rivadavia), Argentina
- Estadio Centenario (Resistencia), Argentina
- Estadio Centenario Ciudad de Quilmes, Argentina
- Estádio Centenário, Brazil
- Estadio Centenario (Armenia, Colombia)
- Estadio Centenario 27 de Febrero, Mexico
- Estadio Centenario (Cuernavaca), Mexico
- Estadio Centenario (Los Mochis), Mexico

== See also ==
- Centenary Stadium, Malta
