= Matej Rudan =

Croatian basketball player (born 2001)

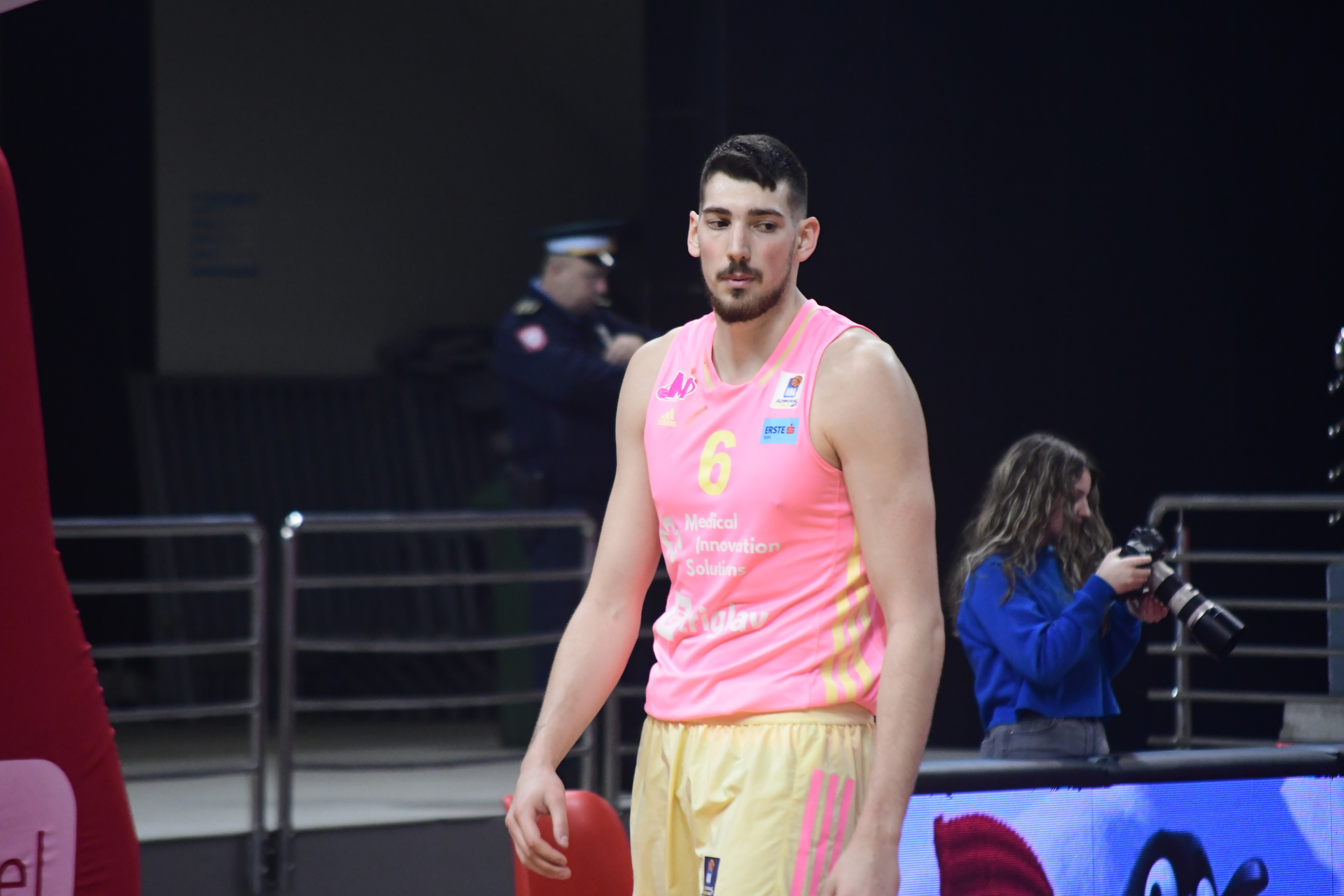
- Rudan with Mega Basket

Free agent
- Position: Power forward

Personal information
- Born: 21 March 2001 (age 25) Zagreb, Croatia
- Listed height: 2.08 m (6 ft 10 in)
- Listed weight: 105 kg (231 lb)

Career information
- Playing career: 2018–present

Career history
- 2018–2021: Bayern Munich II
- 2020–2024: Bayern Munich
- 2021–2023: → Mega Basket
- 2023–2024: → Río Breogán
- 2024–2025: Spartak Subotica
- 2025: Dinamo Zagreb
- 2025: Cibona

Career highlights
- German Cup winner (2021)

Matej Rudan (born 21 March 2001) is a Croatian professional basketball player who last played for KK Cibona of the Croatian League.

== Early career ==
Rudan started to play basketball with KK Omiš-Cagalj Tours Galeb. In 2015, he joined the youth system of his hometown team Cibona. Two years later, he moved to Germany to join the youth system of Bayern Munich. In August 2018, Rudan participated at the Basketball Without Borders Europe camp in Belgrade, Serbia. In February 2019, he participated at the Basketball Without Borders Global 5 camp in Charlotte, North Carolina. Following the 2018–19 Euroleague Adidas NGT, he was named to the All-Tournament Team.

== Professional career ==
In 2018, Rudan got promoted to the reserve team of Bayern Munich of the German 3rd-tier level ProB. In 2020, he got promoted to the Bayern Munich first team. Rudan averaged 3.4 points and 2.3 rebounds for the first team, while he averaged 13.7 points and 4.5 rebounds while playing for the Bayern II team in the 2020–21 season. On June 28, 2021, he parted ways with Bayern Munich. On August 25, 2021, Rudan signed with Mega Basket of the ABA League for one-year deal with an option till the end of the 2022–23 season.

On June 14th, 2023, CB Breogán announced his signing on a 1-year loan from FC Bayern Munich. Rudan average 3.5 points and 1.7 deboinds while playing for CB Breogan in Liga Endesa.

== National team career ==
Rudan was a member of the Croatian under-16 team that finished 4th at the 2017 FIBA U16 European Championship in Latvia. Over seven tournament games, he averaged 17.1 points, 6.7 rebounds, and 1.9 assists per game. He was named to the All-Tournament Team.

Rudan was a member of the Croatian under-17 team that finished 7th at the 2018 FIBA Under-17 Basketball World Cup in Rosario and Santa Fe, Argentina. Over seven tournament games, he averaged 12 points, 4 rebounds, and 2.7 assists per game.

Rudan was a member of the Croatian under-18 team that finished 13th at the 2019 FIBA U18 European Championship in Volos, Greece. Over seven tournament games, he averaged 12.3 points and 5.4 rebounds per game.

Rudan debuted for the Croatian A team in November 2021 at the 2023 FIBA Basketball World Cup qualification game against Slovenia.
