= De'Vion Harmon =

American basketball player

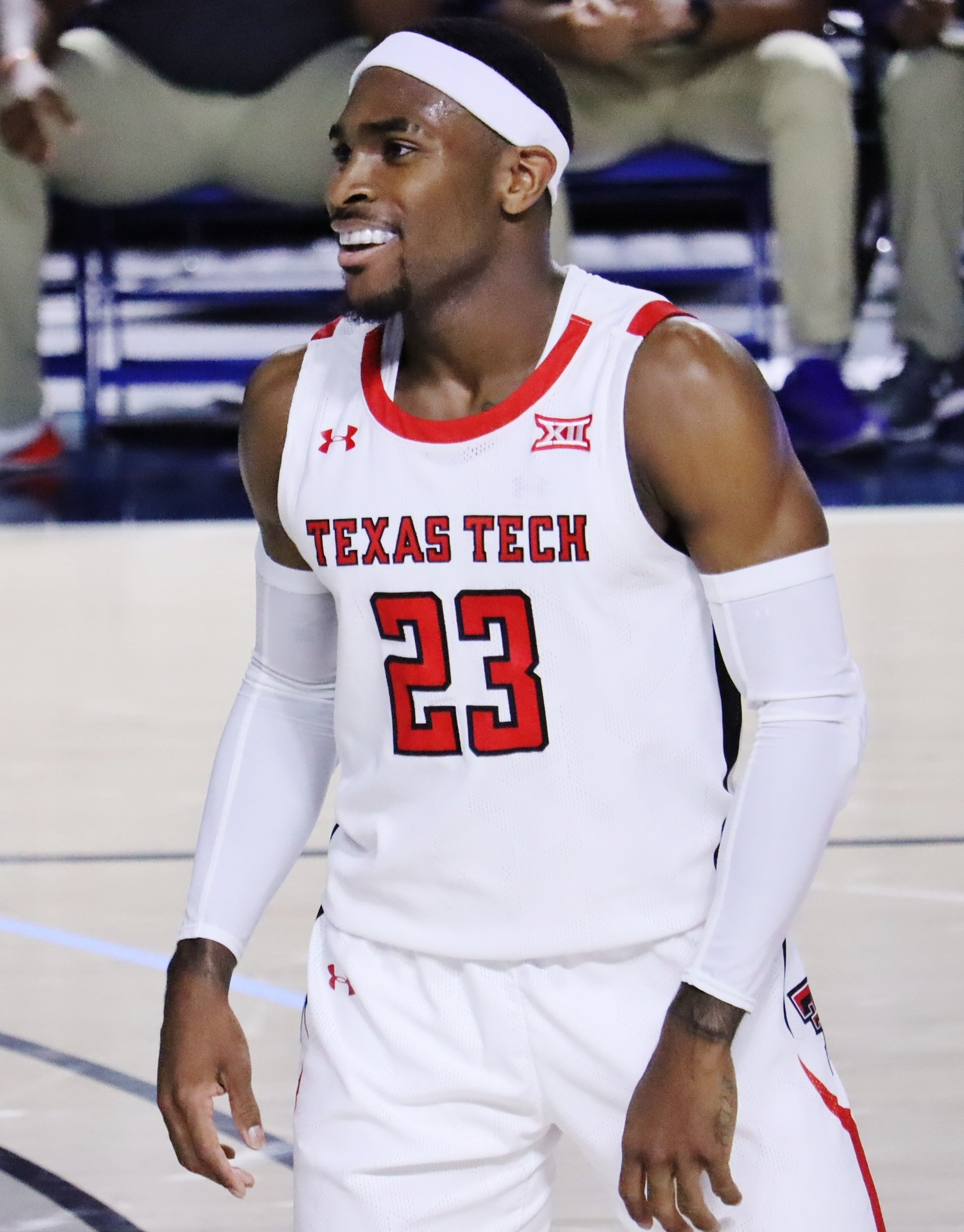
- Harmon with Texas Tech in 2022

No. 2 – Doxa Lefkadas
- Position: Point guard
- League: GBL

Personal information
- Born: January 22, 2001 (age 25) Dallas, Texas, U.S.
- Listed height: 6 ft 2 in (1.88 m)
- Listed weight: 201 lb (91 kg)

Career information
- High school: John H. Guyer (Denton, Texas)
- College: Oklahoma (2019–2021); Oregon (2021–2022); Texas Tech (2022–2023)
- NBA draft: 2023: undrafted
- Playing career: 2023–present

Career history
- 2023–2024: Westchester Knicks
- 2024–2025: Indiana Mad Ants
- 2025–2026̟: Kataja
- 2026–present: Doxa Lefkadas

Career highlights
- Korisliiga Top Scorer (2026); NBA G League Showcase Cup champion (2023); Nike Hoop Summit (2019)
Medals
Men's basketball
Representing United States
FIBA Under-17 World Cup
Gold medal – first place	2018 Argentina	Team
FIBA Americas U16 Championship
Gold medal – first place	2017 Argentina	Team

De'Vion Harmon (born January 22, 2001) is an American professional basketball player for Doxa Lefkadas of the GBL. He played college basketball for the Texas Tech Red Raiders, the Oregon Ducks and the Oklahoma Sooners.

== High school career ==
Harmon attended John H. Guyer High School in Denton, Texas. He played alongside his childhood friend Jalen Wilson. As a freshman, he averaged 14.1 points, 4.7 rebounds, 4.6 assists and 1.6 steals per game to help his team to a 30–3 record, a District 6-6A title and the area finals. As a sophomore, he averaged 18.7 points, 4.2 rebounds, 4.8 assists and 1.5 steals per game to help his team to a 25–6 record, a District 6-6A title and the Bi-District finals. As a junior, he averaged 15.7 points, 5.2 assists and 1.7 steals per game. As a senior, he averaged 20.3 points, five assists and 4.4 rebounds per game. Harmon was a three-time Texas District 6A co-MVP during his career. He was selected to play in the Nike Hoop Summit. He committed to playing college basketball for Oklahoma over offers from Baylor, Marquette, Oklahoma State and Texas.

== College career ==
On November 5, 2019, Harmon made his college debut, scoring a freshman season-high 23 points in an 85–67 win over UTSA. As a freshman, he averaged 7.4 points per game. On January 23, 2021, Harmon scored 22 points in a 75–68 upset win over ninth-ranked Kansas. As a sophomore, he averaged 12.9 points, 3.4 rebounds and 2 assists per game, earning All-Big 12 honorable mention. After the season, Harmon transferred to Oregon. As a junior, he averaged 10.8 points, 2.6 rebounds, and 2.1 assists in 31.5 minutes per game. Following the season, he transferred to Texas Tech.

== Professional career ==
=== Westchester Knicks (2023–2024) ===
After going undrafted in the 2023 NBA draft, Harmon was named to the opening night roster for the Westchester Knicks on November 9, 2023.

=== Indiana Mad Ants (2024–2025) ===
On October 17, 2024, Harmon was traded to the Indiana Mad Ants.

=== Kataja (2025–present) ===
On 29 October 2025, he moved to Finland and signed with Korisliiga team Kataja.

== National team career ==
Harmon represented the United States at the 2017 FIBA Under-16 Americas Championship, where he averaged 11.8 points and helped his team win a gold medal. At the 2018 FIBA Under-17 Basketball World Cup, he won another gold medal, averaging 13.1 points and 3.4 assists per game.

== Career statistics ==
Legend
GP	Games played	GS	Games started	MPG	Minutes per game
FG%	Field goal percentage	3P%	3-point field goal percentage	FT%	Free throw percentage
RPG	Rebounds per game	APG	Assists per game	SPG	Steals per game
BPG	Blocks per game	PPG	Points per game	**Bold**	Career high

=== College ===
Year	Team	GP	GS	MPG	FG%	3P%	FT%	RPG	APG	SPG	BPG	PPG
2019–20	Oklahoma	**31**	22	28.4	.364	.343	.700	1.8	2.0	1.1	**.1**	7.4
2020–21	Oklahoma	25	23	**31.9**	**.477**	.330	.732	**3.4**	2.0	1.1	.0	**12.9**
2021–22	Oregon	**35**	**34**	31.4	.415	**.367**	**.734**	2.6	**2.1**	**1.3**	**.1**	10.8
Career		91	79	30.5	.422	.349	.723	2.2	2.0	1.2	.1	10.2
