= 1990 FIBA World Championship =

1990 edition of the FIBA World Championship

FIBA Campeonato Mundial Basquetbol 1990

Tournament details
- Host country: Argentina
- Dates: 8–19 August
- Officially opened by: Carlos Menem
- Teams: 16 (from 5 confederations)
- Venues: 6 (in 6 host cities)

Final positions
- Champions: Yugoslavia (3rd title)
- Runners-up: Soviet Union
- Third place: United States
- Fourth place: Puerto Rico

Tournament statistics
- Games played: 64
- MVP: (Socialist Federal Republic of Yugoslavia) Toni Kukoč
- Top scorer: (Brazil) Oscar Schmidt (34.6 points per game)

The 1990 FIBA World Championship was the 11th FIBA World Championship, the international basketball world championship for men's national teams. It was hosted by Argentina from 8 to 19 August 1990. The final phase of the competition was held at the Luna Park, Buenos Aires.

Yugoslavia emerged as the tournament winner. This was the last World Championship in which the country participated before its dissolution. Likewise, the Soviet Union participated in its final tournament before its dissolution.

This was the first ever FIBA World Championship (now called FIBA Basketball World Cup) tournament, in which non-American current NBA players that had also already played in an official regular season NBA game could participate.

The mascot was a ñandu named ''Ñandy''

== Venues ==
Group	City	Arena	Capacity	1990 FIBA World Championship is located in Argentina
Final round	Buenos Aires	Luna Park	16,000	1990 FIBA World Championship is located in Argentina
Group D	Córdoba	Pabellón Verde Complejo Ferial	4,000	1990 FIBA World Championship is located in Argentina
Group B	Rosario	Estadio Cubierto Newell's Old Boys	10,000	1990 FIBA World Championship is located in Argentina
Classification Round	Salta	Polideportivo Delmi	3,000	1990 FIBA World Championship is located in Argentina
Group A	Santa Fe	Estadio de la Facultad Regional Santa Fe	5,000	1990 FIBA World Championship is located in Argentina
Group C	Villa Ballester	Sociedad Alemana de Gimnasia	2,000	1990 FIBA World Championship is located in Argentina

== Qualification ==
There were 16 teams taking part in the 1990 World Cup of Basketball.

- Host nation: 1 berth
- FIBA Americas: 12 teams competing for 5 berths
- FIBA Europe: 8 teams competing for 5 berths
- FIBA Oceania: 2 teams competing for 1 berths
- FIBA Asia: 15 teams competing for 2 berths
- FIBA Africa: 11 teams competing for 2 berths

=== Qualified teams ===
Means of qualification	Date	Venue	Berths	Teams qualified
Host	–		1	Argentina
1989 Tournament of the Americas	June 8–18, 1989	Mexico City	5	Puerto Rico; United States; Brazil; Venezuela; Canada
EuroBasket 1989	June 20–25, 1989	(Socialist Federal Republic of Yugoslavia) Zagreb	5	Yugoslavia; Greece; Soviet Union; Italy; Spain
1989 FIBA Oceania Championship	August 28–September 3, 1989	(Australia) Sydney	1	Australia
1989 ABC Championship	September 15–24, 1989	(China) Beijing	2	China; South Korea
FIBA Africa Championship 1989	December 16–27, 1989	(Angola) Luanda	2	Angola; Egypt
Total			16	

== Draw ==
Group A	Group B	Group C	Group D
Angola; Puerto Rico; Venezuela; Yugoslavia	Australia; Brazil; China; Italy	Greece; South Korea; Spain; United States	Argentina; Canada; Egypt; Soviet Union

== Preliminary round ==
=== Group A ===
Pos	Team	Pld	W	L	PF	PA	PD	Pts	Qualification
1	Puerto Rico	3	3	0	248	224	+24	6	Quarterfinal round
2	Yugoslavia	3	2	1	259	245	+14	5	Quarterfinal round
3	Venezuela	3	1	2	241	257	−16	4	9th–16th classification round
4	Angola	3	0	3	231	253	−22	3	9th–16th classification round

Source: FIBA archive
Rules for classification: 1) points; 2) head-to-head points; 3) head-to-head goal average; 4) head-to-head number of points scored.

8 August

Yugoslavia	92–84	Venezuela
Scoring by half: 53-43, 39-41

Estadio de la Facultad Regional Santa Fe, Santa Fe

8 August

Puerto Rico	78–75	Angola
Scoring by half: 42-37, 36-38

Estadio de la Facultad Regional Santa Fe, Santa Fe

9 August

Puerto Rico	88–74	Venezuela
Scoring by half: 49-41, 39-33

Estadio de la Facultad Regional Santa Fe, Santa Fe

9 August

Yugoslavia	92–79	Angola
Scoring by half: 48-28, 44-51

Estadio de la Facultad Regional Santa Fe, Santa Fe

10 August

Venezuela	83–77	Angola
Scoring by half: 49-35, 34-42

Estadio de la Facultad Regional Santa Fe, Santa Fe

10 August

Yugoslavia	75–82	Puerto Rico
Scoring by half: 56-39, 19-43

Estadio de la Facultad Regional Santa Fe, Santa Fe

=== Group B ===
Pos	Team	Pld	W	L	PF	PA	PD	Pts	Qualification
1	Brazil	3	2	1	331	273	+58	5 (Note: Head-to-head record: Brazil 1–1 (1.08 GAvg), Australia 1–1 (0.98 GAvg), Italy 1–1 (0.95 GAvg))	Quarterfinal round
2	Australia	3	2	1	266	227	+39	5	Quarterfinal round
3	Italy	3	2	1	318	290	+28	5	9th–16th classification round
4	China	3	0	3	256	359	−103	3	9th–16th classification round

Source: FIBA archive
Rules for classification: 1) points; 2) head-to-head points; 3) head-to-head goal average; 4) head-to-head number of points scored.
Notes:

8 August

Australia	108–65	China
Scoring by half: 56-45, 52-20

Estadio Cubierto Newell's Old Boys, Rosario

8 August

Brazil	125–109	Italy
Scoring by half: 66-48, 59-61

Estadio Cubierto Newell's Old Boys, Rosario

9 August

Australia	89–94	Italy
Scoring by half: 49-44, 40-50

Estadio Cubierto Newell's Old Boys, Rosario

9 August

Brazil	138–95	China
Scoring by half: 78-45, 60-50

Estadio Cubierto Newell's Old Boys, Rosario

10 August

Italy	115–76	China
Scoring by half: 62-39, 53-37

Estadio Cubierto Newell's Old Boys, Rosario

10 August

Brazil	68–69	Australia
Scoring by half: 32-29, 36-40

Estadio Cubierto Newell's Old Boys, Rosario

=== Group C ===
Pos	Team	Pld	W	L	PF	PA	PD	Pts	Qualification
1	United States	3	3	0	344	247	+97	6	Quarterfinal round
2	Greece	3	2	1	316	272	+44	5	Quarterfinal round
3	Spain	3	1	2	308	298	+10	4	9th–16th classification round
4	South Korea	3	0	3	244	395	−151	3	9th–16th classification round

Source: FIBA archive
Rules for classification: 1) points; 2) head-to-head points; 3) head-to-head goal average; 4) head-to-head number of points scored.

8 August

United States	103–95 (OT)	Greece
Scoring by half: 45-56, 44-33 Overtime: 14-6

Sociedad Alemana de Gimnasia, Villa Ballester

8 August

Spain	130–101	South Korea
Scoring by half: 67-43, 63-58

Sociedad Alemana de Gimnasia, Villa Ballester

9 August

United States	146–67	South Korea
Scoring by half: 70-33, 76-34

Sociedad Alemana de Gimnasia, Villa Ballester

9 August

Spain	93–102	Greece
Scoring by half: 47-54, 46-48

Sociedad Alemana de Gimnasia, Villa Ballester

10 August

Greece	119–76	South Korea
Scoring by half: 79-21, 40-55

Sociedad Alemana de Gimnasia, Villa Ballester

10 August

United States	95–85	Spain
Scoring by half: 51-43, 44-42

Sociedad Alemana de Gimnasia, Villa Ballester

=== Group D ===
Pos	Team	Pld	W	L	PF	PA	PD	Pts	Qualification
1	Soviet Union	3	3	0	289	234	+55	6	Quarterfinal round
2	Argentina (H)	3	2	1	255	250	+5	5	Quarterfinal round
3	Canada	3	1	2	252	254	−2	4	9th–16th classification round
4	Egypt	3	0	3	209	267	−58	3	9th–16th classification round

Source: FIBA archive
Rules for classification: 1) points; 2) head-to-head points; 3) head-to-head goal average; 4) head-to-head number of points scored.
(H) Hosts

8 August

Soviet Union	97–77	Argentina
Scoring by half: 44-33, 53-44

Polideportivo Municipal, Córdoba, Argentina

8 August

Canada	83–68	Egypt
Scoring by half: 38-34, 45-34

Polideportivo Municipal, Córdoba, Argentina

9 August

Canada	88–96	Argentina
Scoring by half: 49-44, 39-52

Polideportivo Municipal, Córdoba, Argentina

9 August

Soviet Union	102–76	Egypt
Scoring by half: 57-42, 45-34

Polideportivo Municipal, Córdoba, Argentina

10 August

Soviet Union	90–81	Canada
Scoring by half: 43-31, 47-50

Polideportivo Municipal, Córdoba, Argentina

10 August

Argentina	82–65	Egypt
Scoring by half: 40-41, 42-24

Polideportivo Municipal, Córdoba, Argentina

== Quarterfinal round ==
The top two finishers from Groups I and II advance to the final round.

=== Group I ===
Pos	Team	Pld	W	L	PF	PA	PD	Pts	Qualification
1	Puerto Rico	3	3	0	262	234	+28	6	Semifinals
2	United States	3	2	1	262	259	+3	5	Semifinals
3	Australia	3	1	2	252	259	−7	4	5th–8th classification round
4	Argentina (H)	3	0	3	267	291	−24	3	5th–8th classification round

Source: FIBA archive
Rules for classification: 1) points; 2) head-to-head points; 3) head-to-head goal average; 4) head-to-head number of points scored.
(H) Hosts

13 August

Puerto Rico	89–79	Australia
Scoring by half: 42-38, 47-41

Luna Park, Buenos Aires

13 August

United States	104–100	Argentina
Scoring by half: 58-42, 46-58

Luna Park, Buenos Aires

14 August

Australia	78–79	United States
Scoring by half: 42-38, 36-41

Luna Park, Buenos Aires

14 August

Puerto Rico	92–76	Argentina
Scoring by half: 50-46, 42-30

Luna Park, Buenos Aires

15 August

Puerto Rico	81–79	United States
Scoring by half: 48-45, 33-34

Luna Park, Buenos Aires

15 August

Australia	95–91	Argentina
Scoring by half: 45-40, 50-52

Luna Park, Buenos Aires

=== Group II ===
Pos	Team	Pld	W	L	PF	PA	PD	Pts	Qualification
1	Yugoslavia	3	3	0	282	230	+52	6	Semifinals
2	Soviet Union	3	2	1	262	257	+5	5	Semifinals
3	Greece	3	1	2	227	240	−13	4	5th–8th classification round
4	Brazil	3	0	3	274	318	−44	3	5th–8th classification round

Source: FIBA archive
Rules for classification: 1) points; 2) head-to-head points; 3) head-to-head goal average; 4) head-to-head number of points scored.

13 August

Greece	57–75	Soviet Union
Scoring by half: 40-37, 17-38

Luna Park, Buenos Aires

13 August

Yugoslavia	105–86	Brazil
Scoring by half: 52-41, 53-45

Luna Park, Buenos Aires

14 August

Yugoslavia	100–77	Soviet Union
Scoring by half: 42-37, 58-40

Luna Park, Buenos Aires

14 August

Brazil	88–103	Greece
Scoring by half: 40-54, 48-49

Luna Park, Buenos Aires

15 August

Yugoslavia	77–67	Greece
Scoring by half: 36-32, 41-35

Luna Park, Buenos Aires

15 August

Brazil	100–110	Soviet Union
Scoring by half: 53-55, 47-55

Luna Park, Buenos Aires

== 9th–16th classification ==
=== Quarterfinal round ===
==== Group III ====
Pos	Team	Pld	W	L	PF	PA	PD	Pts	Qualification
1	Spain	3	3	0	359	261	+98	6	9th–12th classification round
2	Venezuela	3	2	1	305	319	−14	5	9th–12th classification round
3	China	3	1	2	277	317	−40	4	13th–16th classification round
4	Egypt	3	0	3	261	305	−44	3	13th–16th classification round

Source: FIBA archive
Rules for classification: 1) points; 2) head-to-head points; 3) head-to-head goal average; 4) head-to-head number of points scored.

13 August

Spain	107–73	Egypt
Scoring by half: 56-36, 51-37

Polideportivo Delmi, Salta

13 August

Venezuela	100–96	China
Scoring by half: 56-52, 44-44

Polideportivo Delmi, Salta

14 August

China	86–130	Spain
Scoring by half: 41-64, 45-66

Polideportivo Delmi, Salta

14 August

Venezuela	103–101	Egypt
Scoring by half: 50-59, 53-42

Polideportivo Delmi, Salta

15 August

Venezuela	102–122	Spain
Scoring by half: 60-61, 42-61

Polideportivo Delmi, Salta

15 August

China	95–87	Egypt
Scoring by half: 45-33, 50-54

Polideportivo Delmi, Salta

==== Group IV ====
Pos	Team	Pld	W	L	PF	PA	PD	Pts	Qualification
1	Italy	3	3	0	319	259	+60	6	9th–12th classification round
2	Canada	3	2	1	285	376	−91	5	9th–12th classification round
3	Angola	3	1	2	284	261	+23	4	13th–16th classification round
4	South Korea	3	0	3	279	351	−72	3	13th–16th classification round

Source: FIBA archive
Rules for classification: 1) points; 2) head-to-head points; 3) head-to-head goal average; 4) head-to-head number of points scored.

13 August

South Korea	86–124	Canada
Scoring by half: 49-52, 37-72

Polideportivo Delmi, Salta

13 August

Angola	78–86	Italy
Scoring by half: 30-51, 48-35

Polideportivo Delmi, Salta

14 August

Italy	123–100	South Korea
Scoring by half: 54-51, 69-49

Polideportivo Delmi, Salta

14 August

Angola	80–82	Canada
Scoring by half: 40-40, 40-42

Polideportivo Delmi, Salta

15 August

Italy	110–81	Canada
Scoring by half: 49-42, 61-39

Polideportivo Delmi, Salta

15 August

Angola	104–93	South Korea
Scoring by half: 58-45, 46-48

Polideportivo Delmi, Salta

=== 13th–16th classification ===
Semifinals
Angola	83
Egypt	70
China	122
South Korea	100

13th place game
Angola	112
China	96
15th place game
Egypt	115
South Korea	117

==== Semifinals ====
17 August

China	122–100	South Korea
Scoring by half: 63-52, 59-48

Polideportivo Delmi, Salta

17 August

Angola	83–70	Egypt
Scoring by half: 55-36, 28-34

Polideportivo Delmi, Salta

==== Fifteenth place playoff ====
18 August

South Korea	117–115	Egypt
Scoring by half: 52-58, 65-57

Polideportivo Delmi, Salta

==== Thirteenth place playoff ====
19 August

China	96–112	Angola
Scoring by half: 43-58, 53-54

Polideportivo Delmi, Salta

=== 9th–12th classification ===
Semifinals
Italy	108
Venezuela	100
Spain	84
Canada	75

9th place game
Italy	86
Spain	83
11th place game
Venezuela	93
Canada	92

==== Semifinals ====
17 August

Spain	84–75	Canada
Scoring by half: 47-37, 37-38

Polideportivo Delmi, Salta

17 August

Italy	108–100	Venezuela
Scoring by half: 57-33, 51-67

Polideportivo Delmi, Salta

==== Eleventh place playoff ====
18 August

Canada	92–93	Venezuela
Scoring by half: 48-44, 44-49

Polideportivo Delmi, Salta

==== Ninth place playoff ====
19 August

Spain	83–106	Italy
Scoring by half: 39-50, 44-56

Polideportivo Delmi, Salta

== 5th–8th classification ==
Semifinals
Australia	93
Brazil	100
Greece	81
Argentina	78

5th place game
Brazil	97
Greece	94
7th place game
Australia	98
Argentina	84

=== Semifinals ===
17 August

Australia	93–100	Brazil
Scoring by half: 48-45, 45-55

Luna Park, Buenos Aires

17 August

Greece	81–78	Argentina
Scoring by half: 38-42, 43-36

Luna Park, Buenos Aires

=== Seventh place playoff ===
18 August

Australia	98–84	Argentina
Scoring by half: 56-40, 42-44

Luna Park, Buenos Aires

=== Fifth place playoff ===
19 August

Brazil	97–94	Greece
Scoring by half: 55-55, 42-39

Luna Park, Buenos Aires

== Final round ==
Semifinals
Puerto Rico	82
Soviet Union	98
Yugoslavia	99
United States	91

Finals
Soviet Union	75
Yugoslavia	92
3rd place game
Puerto Rico (OT)	105
United States	107

=== Semifinals ===
17 August

Puerto Rico	82–98	Soviet Union
Scoring by half: 46-50, 36-48

Luna Park, Buenos Aires

17 August

Yugoslavia	99–91	United States
Scoring by half: 51-43, 48-48

Luna Park, Buenos Aires

=== Third place playoff ===
18 August

Puerto Rico	105–107 (OT)	United States
Scoring by half: 48-53, 48-43 Overtime: 9-11

Luna Park, Buenos Aires

=== Final ===
19 August

Soviet Union	75–92	Yugoslavia
Scoring by half: 34–52, 41–40
Pts: Vētra, Volkov 15; Rebs: Belostenny 7 Asts: Volkov 4		Pts: Paspalj 20; Rebs: Kukoč 7 Asts: Zdovc 5

Luna Park, Buenos Aires

== Final standings ==
Rank	Team	Record
1	Yugoslavia	7–1
2	Soviet Union	6–2
3	United States	6–2
4	Puerto Rico	6–2
5	Brazil	4–4
6	Greece	4–4
7	Australia	4–4
8	Argentina	2–6
9	Italy	7–1
10	Spain	5–3
11	Venezuela	4–4
12	Canada	3–5
13	Angola	3–5
14	China	2–6
15	South Korea	1–7
16	Egypt	0–8

== Awards ==
1990 World Championship winner

Yugoslavia
Third title

MVP
(Socialist Federal Republic of Yugoslavia) Toni Kukoč

Team Roster:
Dražen Petrović, Velimir Perasović, Zoran Čutura, Toni Kukoč, Žarko Paspalj, Jure Zdovc, Željko Obradović, Radisav Ćurčić, Vlade Divac, Arijan Komazec, Zoran Jovanović, and Zoran Savić. Head coach: Dušan Ivković

== All-Tournament Team ==
- Oscar Schmidt (Brazil)
- Toni Kukoč (Yugoslavia)
- Vlade Divac (Yugoslavia)
- Kenny Anderson (USA)
- Fico López (Puerto Rico)

== Top scorers (ppg) ==
1. Oscar Schmidt (Brazil) 34.6
2. Antonello Riva (Italy) 30.3
3. Panagiotis Giannakis (Greece) 26.0
4. Andrew Gaze (Australia) 24.3
5. Jordi Villacampa (Spain) 23.0
6. Kim Kim (S.Korea) 22.1
7. Gabriel Estaba (Venezuela) 21.5
8. Wang Fei (China) 19.4
9. Kenny Anderson (USA) 18.8
10. Valeri Tikhonenko (USSR) 18.5
