= David Jones García =

Dominican basketball player (born 2001)

No. 25 – San Antonio Spurs
- Position: Small forward
- League: NBA

Personal information
- Born: 24 November 2001 (age 24) Santo Domingo, Dominican Republic
- Listed height: 6 ft 4 in (1.93 m)
- Listed weight: 210 lb (95 kg)

Career information
- High school: Teays Valley Christian School (Teays Valley, West Virginia)
- College: DePaul (2021–2022); St. John's (2022–2023); Memphis (2023–2024)
- NBA draft: 2024: undrafted
- Playing career: 2024–present

Career history
- 2024: Mexico City Capitanes
- 2024–2025: Salt Lake City Stars
- 2025: Mexico City Capitanes
- 2025–present: San Antonio Spurs
- 2025–present: →Austin Spurs

Career highlights
- NBA G League All-Rookie Team (2025); First-team All-AAC (2024)
- Stats at NBA.com
- Stats at Basketball Reference

David Apolinar Jones García (born 24 November 2001) is a Dominican professional basketball player for the San Antonio Spurs of the National Basketball Association (NBA), on a two-way contract with the Austin Spurs of the NBA G League. He played college basketball for the DePaul Blue Demons, St. John's Red Storm, and Memphis Tigers. He represents the Dominican Republic for FIBA events.

== College career ==
Jones was noticed by American scouts while representing his native Dominican Republic in FIBA youth tournaments internationally. After performing particularly well in the 2018 U17 World Cup, Jones and his family decided he would attend high school in the U.S. as a way to enhance his future professional career. Following his prep career for Teays Valley Christian School in West Virginia, Jones signed with DePaul University in Chicago.

Joining the team for the 2021 Big East tournament, Jones played his first full season in 2021–22 and became a starter. On February 9, 2022, Jones recorded the first triple-double in DePaul program history with 22 points, 14 rebounds and 10 assists in a win over Georgetown. After a sophomore campaign where he averaged 14.5 points and 7.4 rebounds per game, Jones chose to transfer, ultimately landing at St. John's. Jones performed well at St. John's, averaging 13.2 points and 6.8 rebounds, but the season was marred by the death of his father and Jones took time away to attend funeral services in the Dominican Republic.

Following the season and dismissal of coach Mike Anderson and hiring of Rick Pitino, Jones again entered the transfer portal. After considering several schools he committed to coach Penny Hardaway and the Memphis Tigers. Jones became the first option of the Tigers' offense for the 2023–24 season. In January 2024, he was named to the Wooden Award midseason watch list in recognition of his performance.

== Professional career ==
After going undrafted in the 2024 NBA draft, Jones signed a two-way contract with the Philadelphia 76ers on 22 July 2024. However, he was waived on 26 September and on 28 October, he signed with the Mexico City Capitanes. In four games with the Capitanes, Jones García averaged 21.2 points, 6.2 rebounds, and 3.5 assists per game.

On 22 November 2024, Jones was signed to a two-way contract by the Utah Jazz of the NBA, splitting time with their G League affiliate, the Salt Lake City Stars. However, on 1 January 2025, he was waived by the Jazz after only appearing in 13 games for the Salt Lake City Stars, and two days later he rejoined Mexico City.

Jones participated in the 2025 NBA Summer League, and earned All-Summer League first team honors which were announced on July 22, 2025. On the same day, Jones signed a two-way contract with the San Antonio Spurs. He made 11 appearances for San Antonio during the 2025–26 NBA season, averaging 2.9 points, 1.2 rebounds, and 1.6 assists. On 4 February 2026, Jones was ruled out for the remainder of the season after undergoing surgery on his right ankle.

On 22 July 2026, Jones García re–signed with San Antonio on a two–way contract.

== Career statistics ==
Legend
GP	Games played	GS	Games started	MPG	Minutes per game
FG%	Field goal percentage	3P%	3-point field goal percentage	FT%	Free throw percentage
RPG	Rebounds per game	APG	Assists per game	SPG	Steals per game
BPG	Blocks per game	PPG	Points per game	**Bold**	Career high

=== NBA ===
Year	Team	GP	GS	MPG	FG%	3P%	FT%	RPG	APG	SPG	BPG	PPG
2025–26	San Antonio	11	0	6.2	.520	.600	.500	1.2	1.6	.5	.1	2.9
Career		11	0	6.2	.520	.600	.500	1.2	1.6	.5	.1	2.9

=== Domestic Leagues ===
Year	Team	League	GP	MPG	FG%	3P%	FT%	RPG	APG	SPG	BPG	PPG
2024–25	Mexico City Capitanes	G League	29	33.4	.490	.352	.908	7.6	3.1	1.4	.5	24.7
2024–25	(United States) Salt Lake City Stars	G League	2	24.5	.412	.286	.833	4.5	2.0	1.0	0.5	20.5
2025–26	(United States) Austin Spurs	G League	16	32.7	.414	.271	.849	6.8	3.5	1.8	1.1	26.1

=== College ===
Year	Team	GP	GS	MPG	FG%	3P%	FT%	RPG	APG	SPG	BPG	PPG
2020–21	DePaul	9	1	14.3	.382	.071	.600	2.7	.4	.4	.2	5.1
2021–22	DePaul	28	27	29.9	.445	.297	.692	7.4	**2.4**	1.7	**1.0**	14.5
2022–23	St. John's	31	17	25.7	.392	.294	.785	6.8	1.6	1.3	.4	13.2
2023–24	Memphis	**32**	**32**	**32.3**	**.459**	**.380**	**.797**	**7.6**	1.8	**2.2**	.4	**21.8**
Career		100	77	28.0	.431	.325	.770	6.9	1.8	1.6	.6	15.6
