= Malcolm Cazalon =

French basketball player (born 2001)

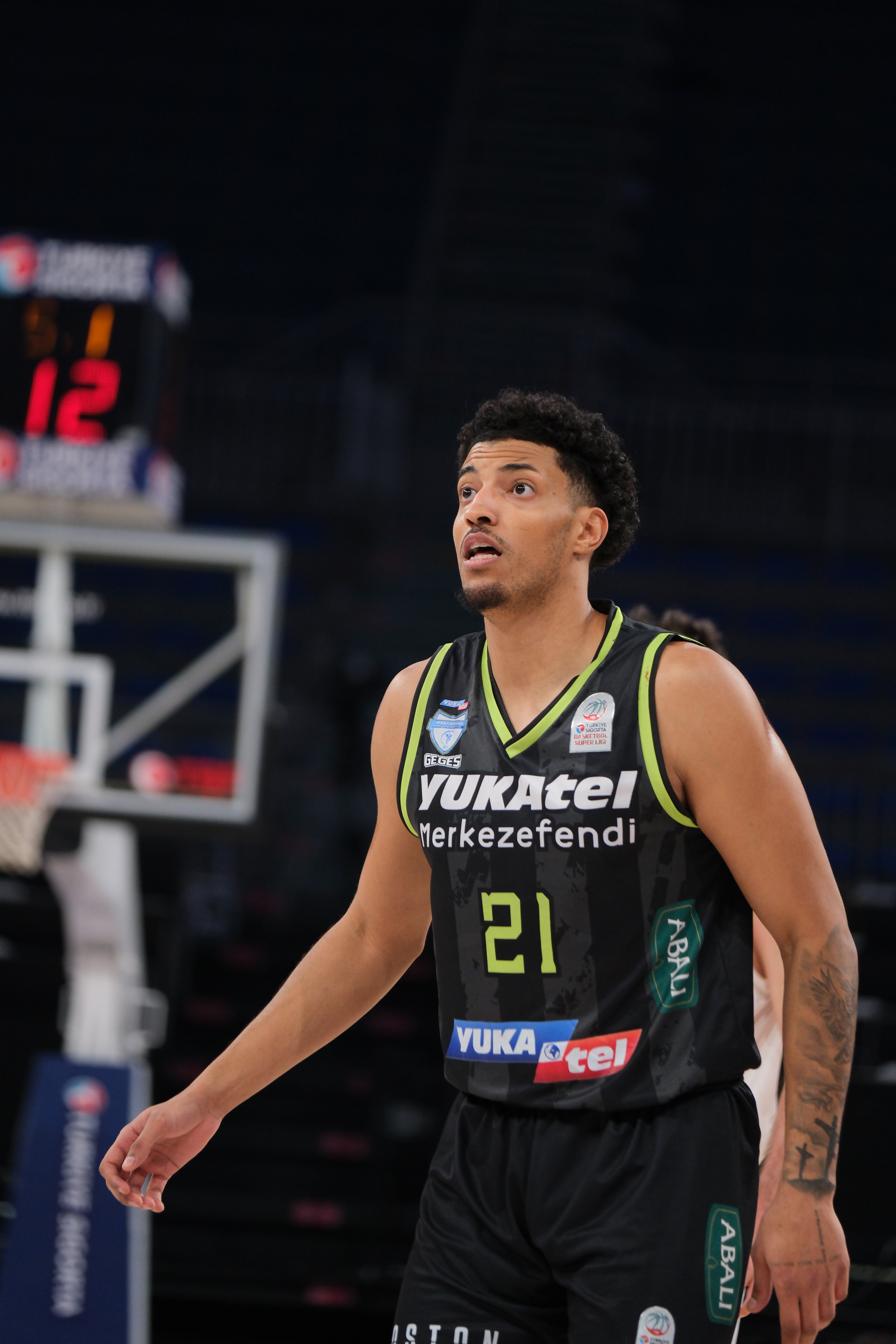
- Cazalon with Merkezefendi in 2026

No. 0 – Cholet Basket
- Position: Shooting guard
- League: LNB Élite; Champions League

Personal information
- Born: 27 August 2001 (age 25) Roanne, France
- Listed height: 6 ft 6 in (1.98 m)
- Listed weight: 185 lb (84 kg)

Career information
- NBA draft: 2023: undrafted
- Playing career: 2018–present

Career history
- 2018–2020: JL Bourg
- 2019–2020: →Leuven Bears
- 2020–2023: Mega Basket
- 2023–2024: Detroit Pistons
- 2023–2024: →Motor City Cruise
- 2024: Westchester Knicks
- 2024–2025: SIG Strasbourg
- 2025: Bilbao Basket
- 2025–2026: Merkezefendi Basket
- 2026–present: Cholet Basket

Career highlights
- FIBA Europe Cup champion (2025)
- Stats at NBA.com
- Stats at Basketball Reference
Medals
Men's basketball
Representing France
FIBA U17 World Cup
Silver medal – second place	2018 Argentina	National team

Malcolm Jean Ahmed Cazalon (born 27 August 2001) is a French professional basketball player for Cholet Basket of the LNB Élite. He has appeared in one NBA regular season game for the Detroit Pistons in 2024.

== Early life ==
Cazalon was born in Roanne, France, where his father Laurent Cazalon was a professional basketball player. He began playing basketball as a child with local club Chorale Roanne. In 2017, he moved to ASVEL, with whom he played in the LNB Espoirs under-21 league.

== Professional career ==
=== JL Bourg / Leuven Bears (2018–2020) ===
On 23 August 2018, Cazalon signed a three-year contract with JL Bourg of the LNB Pro A, the top professional league in France. On 19 July 2019, he was loaned to Leuven Bears of the Pro Basketball League (PBL) in Belgium.

=== Mega Basket (2020–2023) ===
On 10 March 2020, Cazalon signed with Mega Bemax of the Basketball League of Serbia. Following the 2020–21 season, Cazalon declared for the 2021 NBA draft. On July 19, 2021, he withdrew his name from consideration for the 2021 NBA draft. In April 2022, Cazalon declared for the 2022 NBA draft. Later, he withdrew his name from consideration for the 2022 NBA draft. On 4 July 2022, Cazalon signed a one-year contract extension with Mega Basket.

=== Detroit Pistons / Motor City Cruise (2023–2024) ===
After going undrafted in the 2023 NBA draft, Cazalon signed a two-way contract with the Detroit Pistons of the National Basketball Association (NBA) on 2 July 2023 and joined them for the 2023 NBA Summer League. However, he was waived on 21 February 2024.

=== Westchester Knicks (2024) ===
On 24 February 2024, Cazalon joined the Westchester Knicks of the NBA G League.

=== SIG Strasbourg (2024–2025) ===
On 6 December 2024, Cazalon signed with SIG Strasbourg of the LNB Élite.

=== Bilbao Basket (2025) ===
On February 17, 2025, Cazalon was announced as a new player Bilbao Basket of the Liga ACB. He signed a contract for the remainder of the 2024-25 season.

=== Merkezefendi Basket (2025–2026) ===
On August 3, 2025, he signed with Merkezefendi Belediyesi Denizli of the Basketbol Süper Ligi (BSL).

=== Cholet Basket (2026–present) ===
On August 24, 2026, he signed with Cholet Basket of LNB Pro A.

== National team career ==
Cazalon missed the 2017 FIBA U16 European Championship in Podgorica, Montenegro, in which France won the gold medal, with a knee injury. At the 2018 FIBA Under-17 Basketball World Cup in Argentina, he averaged 16.4 points, 4.4 rebounds, and 2.1 assists per game, helping France win the silver medal.

== Career statistics ==
Legend
GP	Games played	GS	Games started	MPG	Minutes per game
FG%	Field goal percentage	3P%	3-point field goal percentage	FT%	Free throw percentage
RPG	Rebounds per game	APG	Assists per game	SPG	Steals per game
BPG	Blocks per game	PPG	Points per game	**Bold**	Career high

=== NBA ===
Year	Team	GP	GS	MPG	FG%	3P%	FT%	RPG	APG	SPG	BPG	PPG
2023–24	Detroit	1	0	2.6	—	—	—	.0	.0	.0	.0	.0
Career		1	0	2.6	—	—	—	.0	.0	.0	.0	.0
