= Estadio Cubierto Newell's Old Boys =

Coordinates: 32°57′19″S 60°39′45″W

Newell's Old Boys Indoor Arena
- Estadio Cubierto Newell's Old Boys
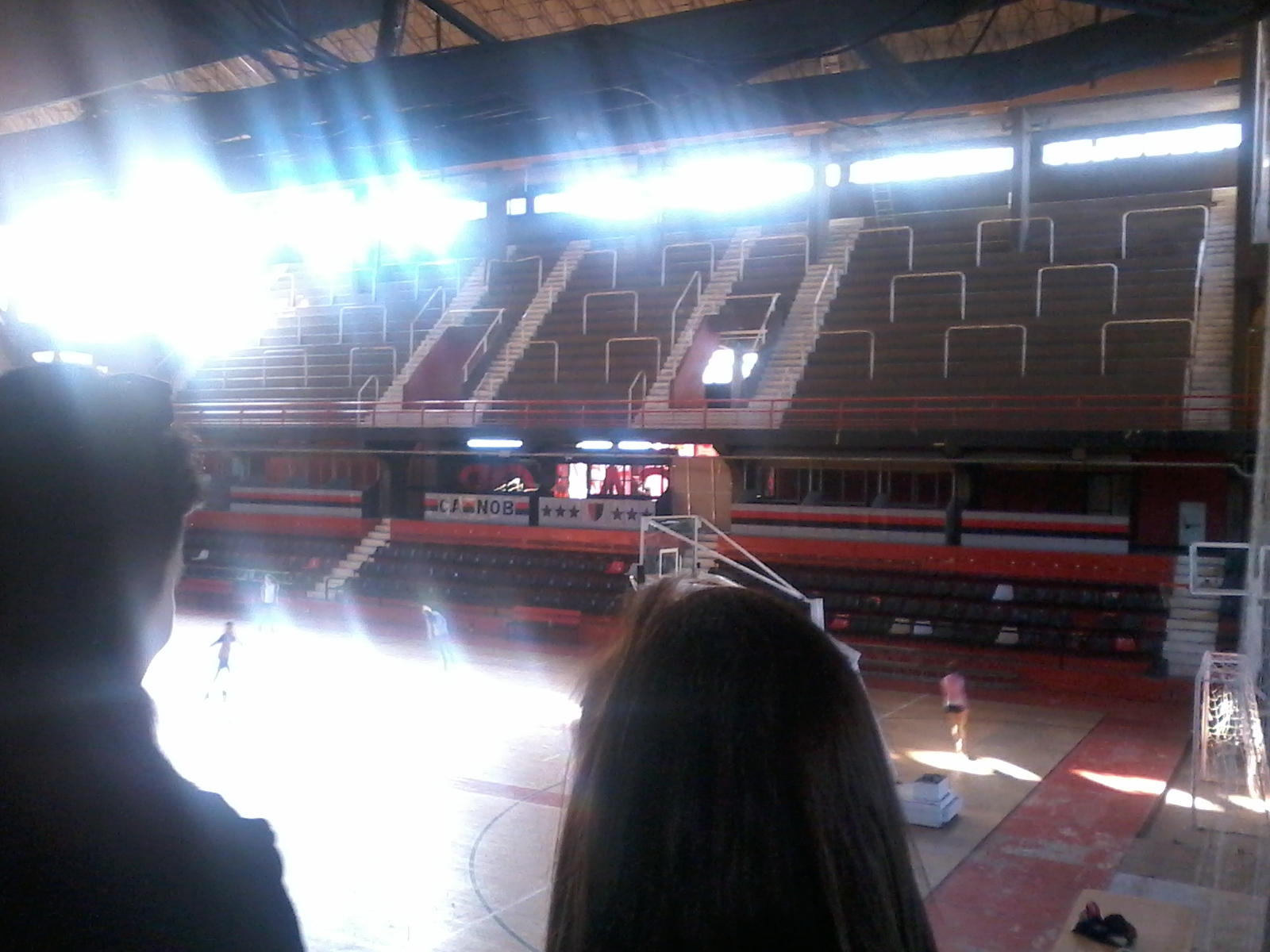
- The stadium in 2014
- Interactive map of Newell's Old Boys Indoor Arena
- Full name: Estadio Cubierto Claudio Newell
- Location: Rosario, Argentina
- Owner: Newell's Old Boys
- Capacity: 11,400 (concerts); 7,500 (sports)
- Type: Arena
- Surface: 7,800 m^{2}
- Field size: 25m x 44m

Construction
- Opened: 1978; 48 years ago
- Renovated: 1982, 2002, 2018

Tenants
- Newell's Old Boys (basketball, futsal, volleyball teams)

Website
- newellsoldboys.com.ar/estadio-cubierto

The Estadio Cubierto Newell's Old Boys is an indoor arena located in the city of Rosario, Argentina. It is primarily used for basketball, futsal, and volleyball games. The arena holds 7,500 people for sporting events, and up to 11,400 spectators for concerts.

Owned and operated by local club Newell's Old Boys, the venue was opened in 1978, six years after the futsal section had been opened. The first notable event hosted by the arena was the 1982 Southern Cross Games.

The stadium has 1,400 seats, 16 boxes, 4 press boxes, among other facilities. It is considered as a symbol of the city of Rosario.

The stadium was named after Claudio Newell (1878–1941), founding member (and then 3rd. president) of Newell's Old Boys in 1903. Newell also was major of Rosario (Feb–May 1921), and deputy for Santa Fe Province (1924–28).

In 2018, the stadium was refurbished to host the 2018 FIBA Under-17 Basketball World Cup. Works included painting, improvements on the locker rooms, and a new lighting system that consisted of 1,500 LED devices, and were costed by the Provincial Government, which invested AR$4 million.

== Sporting events ==
The arena has hosted several events such as:

- II South American Games
- 1982 FIVB Volleyball Men's World Championship
- 1990 FIBA World Championship
- 1993 FIVB Volleyball Men's U21 World Championship
- 1996 FIBA Intercontinental Cup
- Several Argentina matches for the FIVB Volleyball World League between 1997 and 2002.
- 2017 FIVB Volleyball Girls' U18 World Championship
- 2018 FIBA Under-17 Basketball World Cup

== Concerts ==
Some of the artists that have played at this stadium are Ramones (1994), Patricio Rey y sus Redonditos de Ricota (1992), Ska-P, Joan Manuel Serrat, Luis Miguel, Soledad Pastorutti, Chayanne, Thalía, Teen Angels, Los Nocheros, Los Piojos, and La Renga.

Preceded by Palatrussardi; Milan	FIBA Intercontinental Cup; Final Venue; 1996	Succeeded by Ginásio José Corrêa; Barueri, São Paulo
