= Polideportivo Delmi =

Coordinates: 24°46′34″S 65°25′22″W

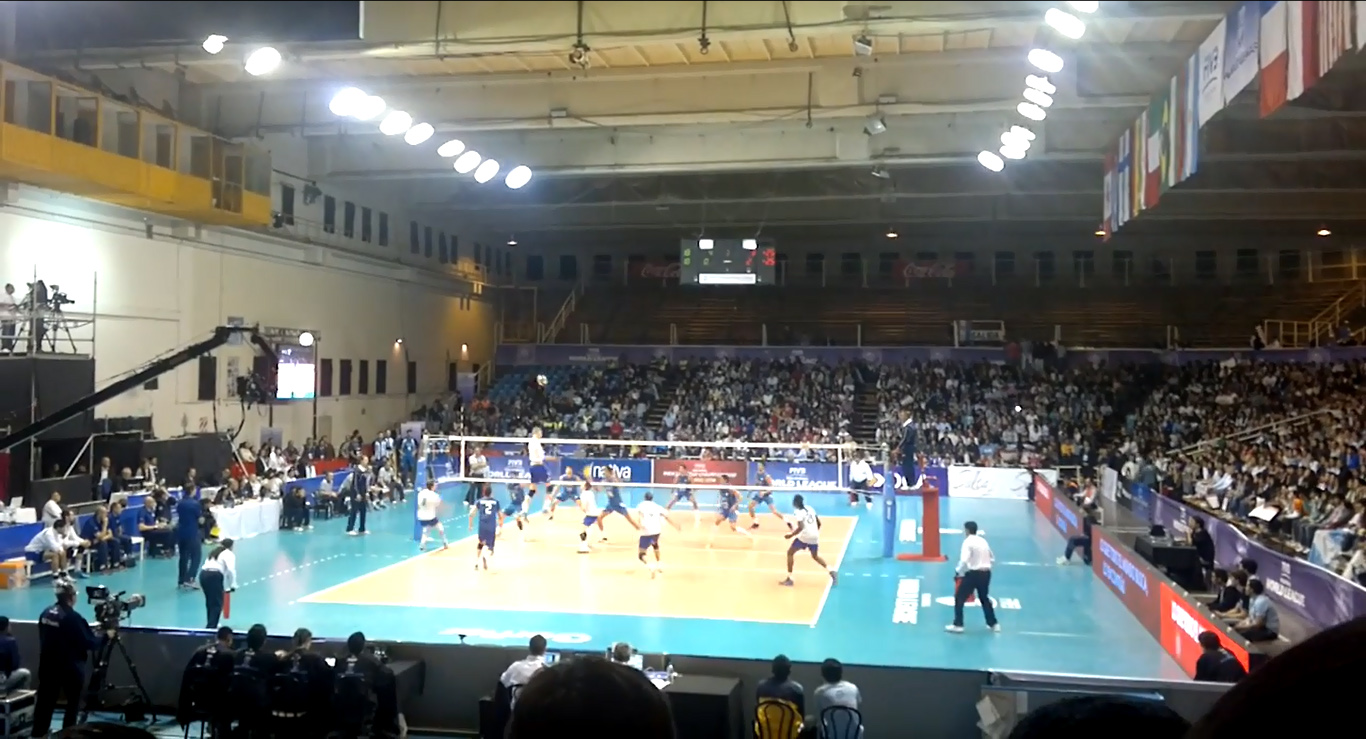
- Interactive map of Polideportivo Delmi
- Full name: Polideportivo Delmi
- Location: Salta, Argentina
- Capacity: 6,000

Construction
- Opened: 1986

Tenant
- Salta Province Government

Polideportivo Delmi, is an arena in Salta, Argentina. It is primarily used for volleyball and basketball. It opened in 1986 and holds 6,000 spectators.

This stadium hosted the second round groups III and IV, and the 13th to 16th and 9th to 12th classification for the 1990 FIBA World Championship. During the 2002 FIVB Men's World Championship Delmi was the venue for Pool F (first round) and Pool K (second round) matches.
