= Ömercan İlyasoğlu =

Turkish basketball player (born 2001)

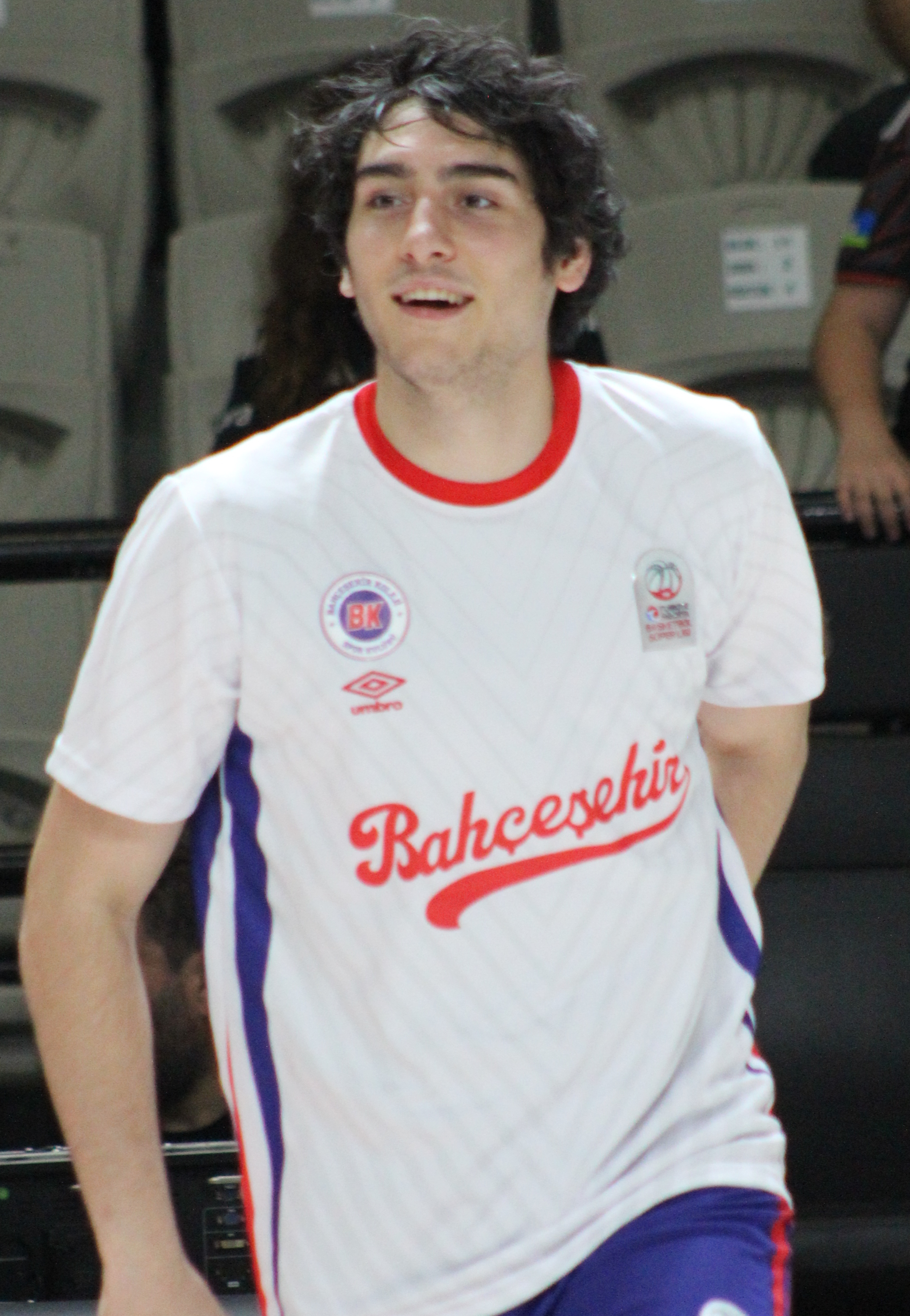
- İlyasoğlu with Bahçeşehir in 2024

No. 21 – Bursaspor Basketbol
- Position: Point guard
- League: Basketbol Süper Ligi

Personal information
- Born: January 1, 2001 (age 25) Istanbul, Turkey
- Listed height: 1.93 m (6 ft 4 in)
- Listed weight: 87 kg (192 lb)

Career information
- NBA draft: 2023: undrafted
- Playing career: 2018–present

Career history
- 2018–2023: Anadolu Efes
- 2020–2021: →Frutti Extra Bursaspor
- 2022–2023: →Beşiktaş
- 2023–2024: Mega
- 2024–2025: Bahçeşehir Koleji
- 2025–present: Merkezefendi Basket
- 2026–present: Bursaspor Basketbol

Career highlights
- 2x EuroLeague champion (2021, 2022); Turkish Super Cup winner (2022); Turkish Cup winner (2022); Turkish League champion (2019)

Ömercan İlyasoğlu (born January 1, 2001) is a Turkish professional basketball player for Bursaspor Basketbol of the Basketbol Süper Ligi (BSL).
