= Estadio Ángel Malvicino =

Indoor arena in Santa Fe, Argentina

Angel Malvicino Stadium
- Estadio Angel Malvicino
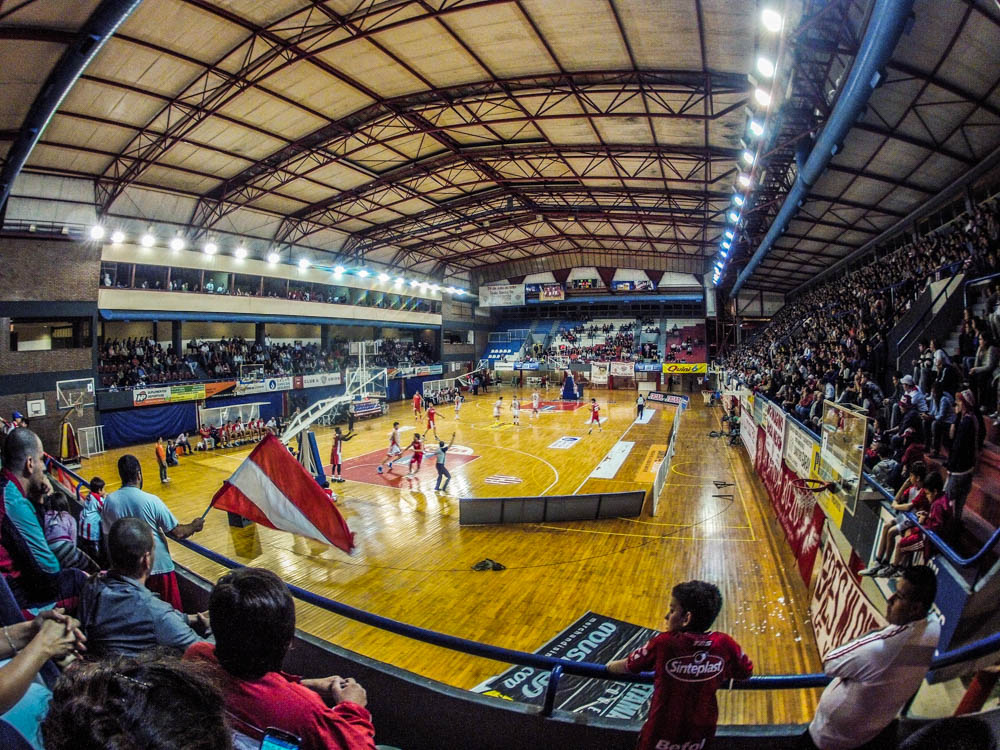
- The arena during a basketball game in 2014
- Interactive map of Angel Malvicino Stadium
- Location: Santa Fe, Argentina
- Coordinates: 31.63°S 60.71°W
- Owner: C.A. Unión
- Capacity: 7,000
- Surface: 5,099 m^{2}
- Field size: 52 x 28 m

Construction
- Opened: May 20, 1998; 28 years ago

Tenant
- C.A. Unión

Website
- clubaunion.com.ar/estadio-a-malvicino

The Estadio Ángel P. Malvicino is an indoor arena in Santa Fe, Argentina. It hosts basketball, volleyball, futsal, boxing, and handball matches, as well as artistic events. Unión de Santa Fe currently plays its home matches at this stadium for the Liga Nacional de Básquet, the highest level of the Argentine basketball league system.

The name of the stadium honors Ángel Malvicino, who was president of the Unión de Santa Fe from 1980 to 1981, from 1995 to 2003, and from 2005 to 2007. Malvicino donated the stadium directly to the club.

== Facilities ==
The stadium's capacity ranges from 4,500 to 7,000 spectators, depending on the type of event being hosted. It also has an authorities box, a VIP lounge, and a press area with eleven booths equipped for radio and TV live transmission. There are medical facilities, a drug lab, and several changing rooms for athletes and referees.

== Events ==
During the 2002 FIVB Volleyball Men's World Championship, this stadium hosted Group B, which consisted of Poland, Italy, Canada and Croatia; and the second round Group J, which consisted of Brazil, France, the Netherlands, and the Czech Republic.
