= Đorđe Pažin =

Serbian basketball player (born 2001)

No. 7 – Forlì 2.015
- Position: Shooting guard / small forward
- League: Serie A2

Personal information
- Born: March 31, 2001 (age 25) Ćuprija, Serbia, FR Yugoslavia
- Listed height: 2.00 m (6 ft 7 in)
- Listed weight: 86 kg (190 lb)

Career information
- Playing career: 2018–present

Career history
- 2018–2019: Partizan
- 2018: → Mladost Zemun
- 2019–2020: FMP
- 2019–2020: → Sloboda Užice
- 2020–2021: Sloboda Užice
- 2021–2022: Borac Banja Luka
- 2022–: Forlì 2.015

Career highlights
- Serbian League Cup winner (2020)
Medals
Men's basketball
Representing Serbia
FIBA Europe Under-16 Championship
Bronze medal – third place	2017 Montenegro	U16 team

Đorđe Pažin (Serbian Cyrillic: Ђорђе Пажин, born March 31, 2001) is a Serbian professional basketball player for Forlì 2.015 in the Serie A2. Standing at 2.00 m (6 ft 6 1/2 in), he plays at the shooting guard / small forward position.

== Professional career ==
Pažin played for the Stella Azzurra youth system in Rome from 2015 to 2017. On November 15, 2017, Pažin signed a multi-year contract with Partizan Belgrade. In March 2018, he was loaned to Mladost Zemun. In August 2018, he participated at the Basketball Without Borders Europe camp in Belgrade, Serbia.

On November 14, 2019, Pažin signed a three-year contract with FMP. In December, he was loaned out to Sloboda Užice for the 2019–20 season. In September 2020, he parted ways with FMP without a single official game played for the club. On September 22, he signed for Sloboda Užice. On August 16, 2021, he signed for Borac Banja Luka. Pažin parted ways with the team on January 24, 2022, after averaging 8.2 points per game.
