= Estadio Centenario (Comodoro Rivadavia) =

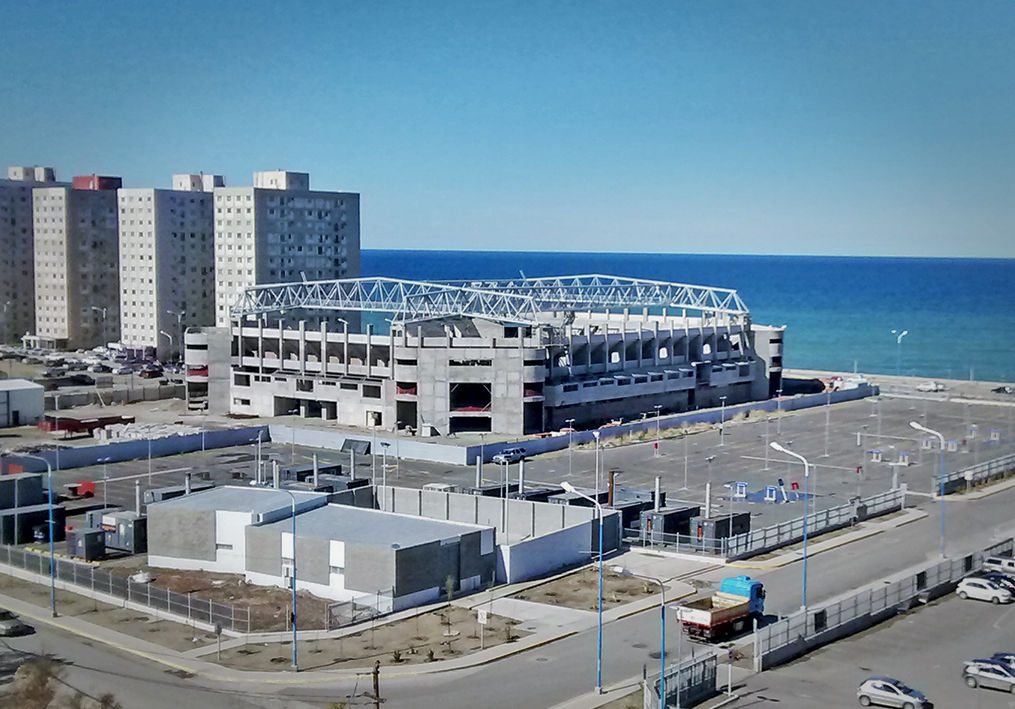
- Location: Comodoro Rivadavia, Chubut Province
- Capacity: 10,000 (Basketball); 12,000 (Concerts)
- Surface: 9,500 m2

Construction
- Groundbreaking: 2006

Tenants
- Chubut Province; Gimnasia y Esgrima de Comodoro Rivadavia

The Estadio Centenario will be an indoor arena in Comodoro Rivadavia, Chubut Province. With 10,000 seats, it will be the largest indoor venue in Patagonia and will host matches of local basketball team Gimnasia y Esgrima de Comodoro Rivadavia, volleyball, handball, tennis matches and concerts.
