= Jovan Kljajić =

Montenegrin basketball player

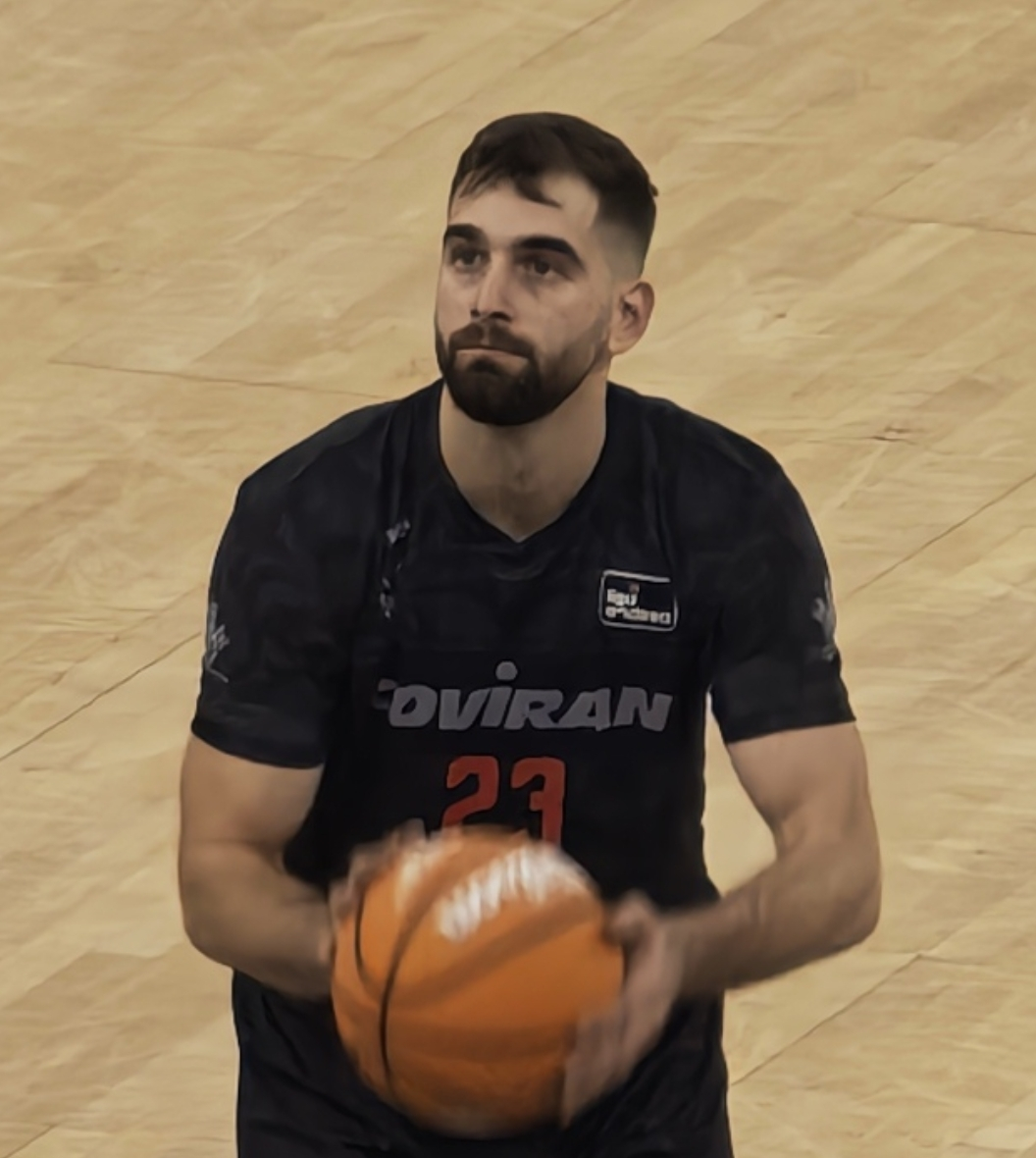
- Kljajić with Granada in 2025

No. 3 – Coviran Granada
- Position: Shooting guard
- League: Liga ACB

Personal information
- Born: September 11, 2001 (age 25) Podgorica, Montenegro, FR Yugoslavia
- Listed height: 1.98 m (6 ft 6 in)
- Listed weight: 91 kg (201 lb)

Career information
- Playing career: 2019–present

Career history
- 2019–2025: Gran Canaria
- 2020–2021: → Bilbao Basket
- 2021–2022: → Prienai
- 2025–present: Coviran Granada

Career highlights
- EuroCup champion (2023)
Medals
Men's basketball
Representing Montenegro
FIBA Europe Under-16 Championship
| Silver medal – second place | 2017 Montenegro | Team |

Jovan Kljajić (born September 11, 2001) is a Montenegrin professional basketball player who plays for Coviran Granada of the Liga ACB. He is a 1.98 m tall shooting guard, and represents the Montenegro national team internationally.

== Early life ==
Jovan Kljajić was born in Podgorica, Montenegro, and began playing basketball at a young age, quickly standing out as one of the country's top youth prospects. He drew national attention in 2015 when he scored 57 points in the Montenegrin U14 championship final, leading his team to a victory over Budućnost VOLI.

In 2016, he moved to Spain to join the youth academy of Gran Canaria. He rose to prominence in 2019 by leading Gran Canaria to the title at the Torneo de L’Hospitalet, recording standout performances against teams such as Partizan (17 points), Joventut Badalona (15 points, 5 rebounds, 3 assists), and notably scoring 26 points in a crucial win over Barcelona. He was selected to the tournament's All-Star Five.

Soon after, Kljajić was invited to the 2019 Basketball Without Borders Global Camp organized by the NBA and FIBA. He impressed scouts and coaches and was selected among the top 12 players of the camp.

== Professional career ==
Kljajić made his professional debut in the EuroCup at age 16, playing against Tofaş in Round 7 of the 2017–18 season for Gran Canaria. At the time, he was the youngest player ever to debut in the EuroCup.

At age 18, he made his EuroLeague debut against CSKA Moscow, registering 2 points in limited minutes.

In search of more playing time, he spent the 2020–21 season on loan at Bilbao Basket, appearing mainly in the Basketball Champions League and receiving limited minutes in the ACB.

His most productive season came in 2021–22 with Prienai in Lithuania, where he averaged 12.4 points per game. Notable performances included:

- 28 points and 8 assists vs. Šiauliai,
- 26 points, 5 rebounds, and 4 assists vs. Pieno Žvaigždės,
- 20 points vs. Žalgiris.

During the 2023–24 ACB season, his best game for Gran Canaria came on April 22, 2024, in a 77–70 away victory against Breogán. He scored 15 points, added 2 blocks, and posted a +19 plus/minus in the overtime win.

In 2024, Kljajić became a EuroCup champion with Gran Canaria, contributing during the team's title-winning campaign. During the 2024–25 EuroCup season, he averaged 2.1 points, 0.9 rebounds, and 0.6 assists per game, shooting 69.2% from the field and 33.3% from three-point range. In the ACB, he played 25 games but totaled just 6 minutes and 50 seconds on the court, averaging 2.3 points.

In 2025, after his contract with Gran Canaria expired, Kljajić signed with Coviran Granada for the 2025–26 season.
