= Mustafa Kurtuldum =

Turkish basketball player (born 2001)

Mersin MSK
- Position: Shooting guard
- League: TBL

Personal information
- Born: May 10, 2001 (age 25) Istanbul, Turkey
- Listed height: 6 ft 3 in (1.91 m)

Career information
- Playing career: 2018–present

Career history
- 2018–2021: Anadolu Efes
- 2020–2021: → Merkezefendi Bld. Denizli Basket
- 2021–2022: Büyükçekmece
- 2022–2024: Tofaş
- 2024–2026: Petkim Spor
- 2026–present: Mersin MSK

Career highlights
- Turkish League champion (2019)

Mustafa Kurtuldum (born May 10, 2001) is a Turkish professional basketball player for Mersin MSK of the Türkiye Basketbol Ligi (TBL), who plays as a shooting guard.
