= National Technological University – Santa Fe Regional Faculty =

Coordinates: 31.6170°S 60.6752°W

- Facultad Regional Santa Fe
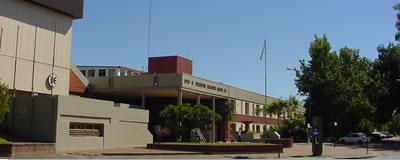
- Type: Public, free and secular.
- Established: 1953
- Students: ca. 3.000 students
- Location: Santa Fe, Argentina
- Website: www.frsf.utn.edu.ar

The National Technological University – Santa Fe Regional Faculty (Spanish: Universidad Tecnológica Nacional - Facultad Regional Santa Fe (UTN-FRSF)).

== History ==
This college is one of the 29 regional faculties of Argentina's National Technological University. The faculty was founded in 1953 and its first classes were at the National University of the Littoral because it didn't have its own building. The main building was built in 1978, next to the Setúbal lake. The faculty has its own stadium: Estadio U.T.N. Santa Fe, it was opened on November 10, 1982. It was specially built for the 1982 Southern Cross Games and has also hosted the 1990 FIBA World Championship, several FIVB Volleyball World League matches and the 2017 FIVB Volleyball Girls' U18 World Championship. The stadium has capacity for 3.500 and a surface of 17.500 m^{2}.

Nowadays the faculty has approximately 3.000 students, 430 teachers, 144 researchers and 1000 non-teaching staff.

== Higher Education ==
- Technicatures:
  - Superior Technicature in Information Technology
  - Superior Technicature in Mecatronics

=== Degrees ===
- Civil engineering
- Electrical engineering
- Mechanical engineering
- Industrial engineering
- Information systems engineering

=== Postgraduate Degrees ===
- Doctorates:
  - Engineering Doctorate - Information Systems Engineering Mention
  - Engineering Doctorate - Industrial Engineering Mention
- Magisters:
  - Magister in Environmental Engineering
  - Magister in Information Systems Engineering
  - Magister in Quality Engineering
- Specializations:
  - Specialization in Environmental Engineering
  - Specialization in Information Systems Engineering
  - Specialization in Quality Engineering
  - Specialization in Work Hygiene and Safety

== Sources ==
- (in Spanish) Official website
