= Ryan Nembhard =

Canadian basketball player (born 2003)

No. 9 – Denver Nuggets
- Position: Point guard
- League: NBA

Personal information
- Born: March 10, 2003 (age 23) Aurora, Ontario, Canada
- Listed height: 5 ft 11 in (1.80 m)
- Listed weight: 180 lb (82 kg)

Career information
- High school: Montverde Academy (Montverde, Florida)
- College: Creighton (2021–2023); Gonzaga (2023–2025)
- NBA draft: 2025: undrafted
- Playing career: 2025–present

Career history
- 2025–2026: Dallas Mavericks
- 2025–2026: →Texas Legends
- 2026–present: Denver Nuggets
- 2026–present: →Grand Rapids Gold

Career highlights
- NCAA assists leader (2025); 2× First-team All-WCC (2024, 2025); Big East Freshman of the Year (2021)
- Stats at NBA.com
- Stats at Basketball Reference
Medals
Men's basketball
Representing Canada
FIBA Under-19 World Cup
Bronze medal – third place	2021 Latvia	Team
FIBA Americas U16 Championship
Silver medal – second place	2019 Brazil	Team

Ryan Nembhard (born March 10, 2003) is a Canadian professional basketball player for the Denver Nuggets of the National Basketball Association (NBA), on a two-way contract with the Grand Rapids Gold of the NBA G League. He played college basketball for the Creighton Bluejays and Gonzaga Bulldogs.

== High school career ==
Nembhard attended Montverde Academy, where he played alongside Division I prospects Precious Achiuwa, Cade Cunningham, Scottie Barnes, Day'Ron Sharpe, Moses Moody, Jalen Duren, Caleb Houstan and Langston Love. Following his freshman season, he opted to reclassify from the class of 2022 to the class of 2021. As a senior, Nembhard helped Montverde defeat Sunrise Christian Academy 62–52 to win the 2021 GEICO High School Basketball Nationals. He finished with 12 points, 7 assists, 3 rebounds and 2 steals and won game MVP honors. Regarded as a four-star recruit, Nembhard was ranked No. 68 in his class and the No. 11 point guard according to 247Sports. In June 2020, he committed to playing college basketball for Creighton, choosing the Bluejays over Ohio State, Stanford, Florida and Seton Hall.

== College career ==
In his college debut against Arkansas–Pine Bluff, Nembhard posted 15 points and 10 assists in a 90–77 win. On November 16, 2021, he scored 22 points and had five rebounds and five assists in a 77–69 win against Nebraska. On February 23, 2022, Nembhard suffered a wrist injury in an 81–79 win against St. John's which required season-ending surgery. He averaged 11.3 points, 3.1 rebounds, 4.4 assists and 1.3 steals per game as a freshman. Nembhard started all 27 games and was a six-time Big East Freshman of the Week honoree. He was named Big East Freshman of the Year. As a sophomore, Nembhard averaged 12.1 points, 4.8 assists and 4.0 rebounds per game, guiding Creighton to the Elite Eight of the NCAA Tournament. Following the season he entered the transfer portal and ultimately transferred to Gonzaga.

Nembhard started every game as a junior and averaged 12.6 points and 6.9 assists per game. Coming into his senior season, he was named to the Bob Cousy Award watch list. He averaged 10.5 points, 9.8 assists (leading the NCAA) and 1.7 steals per game and led Gonzaga to its 22nd all-time West Coast Conference tournament title.

== Professional career ==
=== Dallas Mavericks (2025–2026) ===
After not being selected in the 2025 NBA draft, Nembhard signed a two-way contract with the Dallas Mavericks. On December 1, 2025, he scored a career-high of 28 points in a 131–121 win against the Denver Nuggets. Two days later, on December 3, he earned himself a double-double, scoring 15 points and getting a career-high 13 assists in a 118–108 win against the Miami Heat. On March 1, 2026, following the waiving of guard Tyus Jones, the Mavericks decided to use the extra cap space created by the move to sign Nembhard to a standard multi-year contract. On April 12, Nembhard put up 15 points, nine rebounds, and a career-high 23 assists in a 149–128 win over the Chicago Bulls. His 23 assists set a rookie record for the most assists in a game in Mavericks franchise history, surpassing the previous record of 17 set by his former head coach, Jason Kidd. On June 29, 2026, the Mavericks exercised Nembhard's team option contract for the 2026-27 NBA season.

On July 19, 2026, Nembhard was traded to the Atlanta Hawks in a three-team trade. On September 22, Nembhard was traded to the Charlotte Hornets alongside Buddy Hield in exchange for Dorian Finney-Smith. He was waived by Charlotte on September 26.

=== Denver Nuggets (2026–present) ===
On September 30, 2026, Nembhard signed a two-way contract with the Denver Nuggets.

== National team career ==
Nembhard has represented Canada in several international competitions. At the 2019 FIBA Under-16 Americas Championship in Brazil, he averaged 14.3 points, 9 assists, and 2 steals per game. In the 2021 FIBA Under-19 Basketball World Cup in Latvia, he averaged 15.1 points, 3.7 rebounds, and 6.7 assists per game, leading his team to the bronze medal. He scored 21 points in the third-place game against Serbia.

== Career statistics ==
Legend
GP	Games played	GS	Games started	MPG	Minutes per game
FG%	Field goal percentage	3P%	3-point field goal percentage	FT%	Free throw percentage
RPG	Rebounds per game	APG	Assists per game	SPG	Steals per game
BPG	Blocks per game	PPG	Points per game	**Bold**	Career high
*	Led the league

=== NBA ===
Year	Team	GP	GS	MPG	FG%	3P%	FT%	RPG	APG	SPG	BPG	PPG
2025–26	Dallas	60	27	19.5	.415	.356	.806	2.2	5.3	.4	.0	6.6
Career		60	27	19.5	.415	.356	.806	2.2	5.3	.4	.0	6.6

=== College ===
Year	Team	GP	GS	MPG	FG%	3P%	FT%	RPG	APG	SPG	BPG	PPG
2021–22	Creighton	27	27	34.8	.404	.311	.732	3.1	4.4	1.3	0	11.3
2022–23	Creighton	**37**	**37**	34.0	.432	.356	**.871**	**4.0**	4.8	.7	**.1**	12.1
2023–24	Gonzaga	35	35	**35.8**	.445	.321	.752	**4.0**	6.9	1.2	0	**12.6**
2024–25	Gonzaga	35	35	35.1	**.446**	**.404**	.770	3.0	**9.8***	**1.7**	**.1**	10.5
Career		134	134	34.9	.432	.347	.784	3.5	6.6	1.2	.1	11.7

== Personal life ==
Nembhard's older brother Andrew plays professionally for the Indiana Pacers.

== See also ==
- List of NCAA Division I men's basketball season assists leaders
- List of NCAA Division I men's basketball career assists leaders
- List of NBA single-game assists leaders
