= List of NCAA Division I men's basketball career assists leaders =

In basketball, an assist is a pass to a teammate that directly leads to a score by field goal. The top 25 highest assists totals in National Collegiate Athletic Association (NCAA) Division I men's basketball history are listed below. The NCAA did not split into its current divisions format until August 1973. From 1906 to 1955, there were no classifications to the NCAA nor its predecessor, the Intercollegiate Athletic Association of the United States (IAAUS). Then, from 1956 to spring 1973, colleges were classified as either "NCAA University Division (Major College)" or "NCAA College Division (Small College)". Assists are a relatively new statistic in college basketball, having only become an official statistic beginning with the 1983–84 season. Therefore Billy Allen, who split his career between SMU and Nevada and amassed 940 assists during his career between 1978 and 1983, is not officially recognized in the all-time ranks.

According to the 2022–23 NCAA Division I men's basketball media guide, there were also two seasons in the early 1950s in which assists were recorded: 1950–51 and 1951–52.

The current all-time leader in career assists is Braden Smith of the Purdue Boilermakers. He recorded 1,103 assists in 149 games (7.40 per game average) between 2022 and 2026. Second on the list is Bobby Hurley of the Duke Blue Devils who compiled 1,076 assists over four seasons. Only three other players besides Smith and Hurley have recorded 1,000 career assists at the Division I level: Chris Corchiani of NC State (1,038), Ed Cota of North Carolina (1,030), and Jason Brickman of LIU Brooklyn (1,009). Sherman Douglas of Syracuse is the only player on this list who also recorded 20 or more assists in a single game at both the Division I and National Basketball Association levels. For his college career, he played in 138 games while recording 960 assists.

== Key ==
Pos.	G	F	C	Ref.
Position	Guard	Forward	Center	References

*	Elected to the Naismith Memorial Basketball Hall of Fame as a player
Team (X)	Denotes the number of times a player from that team is represented on this list
C	Player was active in the 2020–21 season, benefiting from the NCAA's blanket COVID-19 eligibility waiver
^	Player still active in NCAA Division I

== Top 25 career assists leaders ==
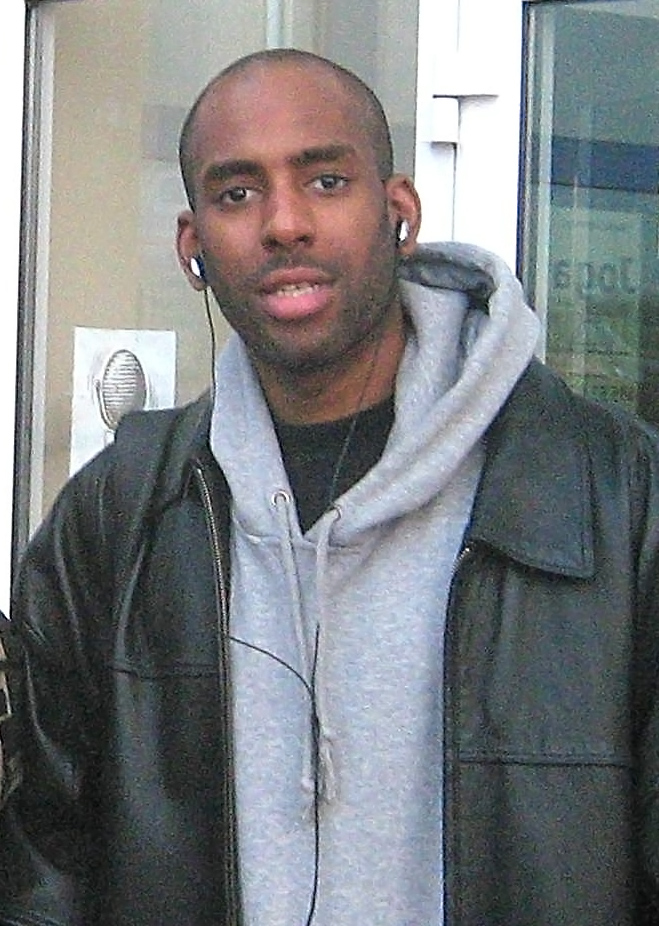
Ed Cota, North Carolina (1996–2000)

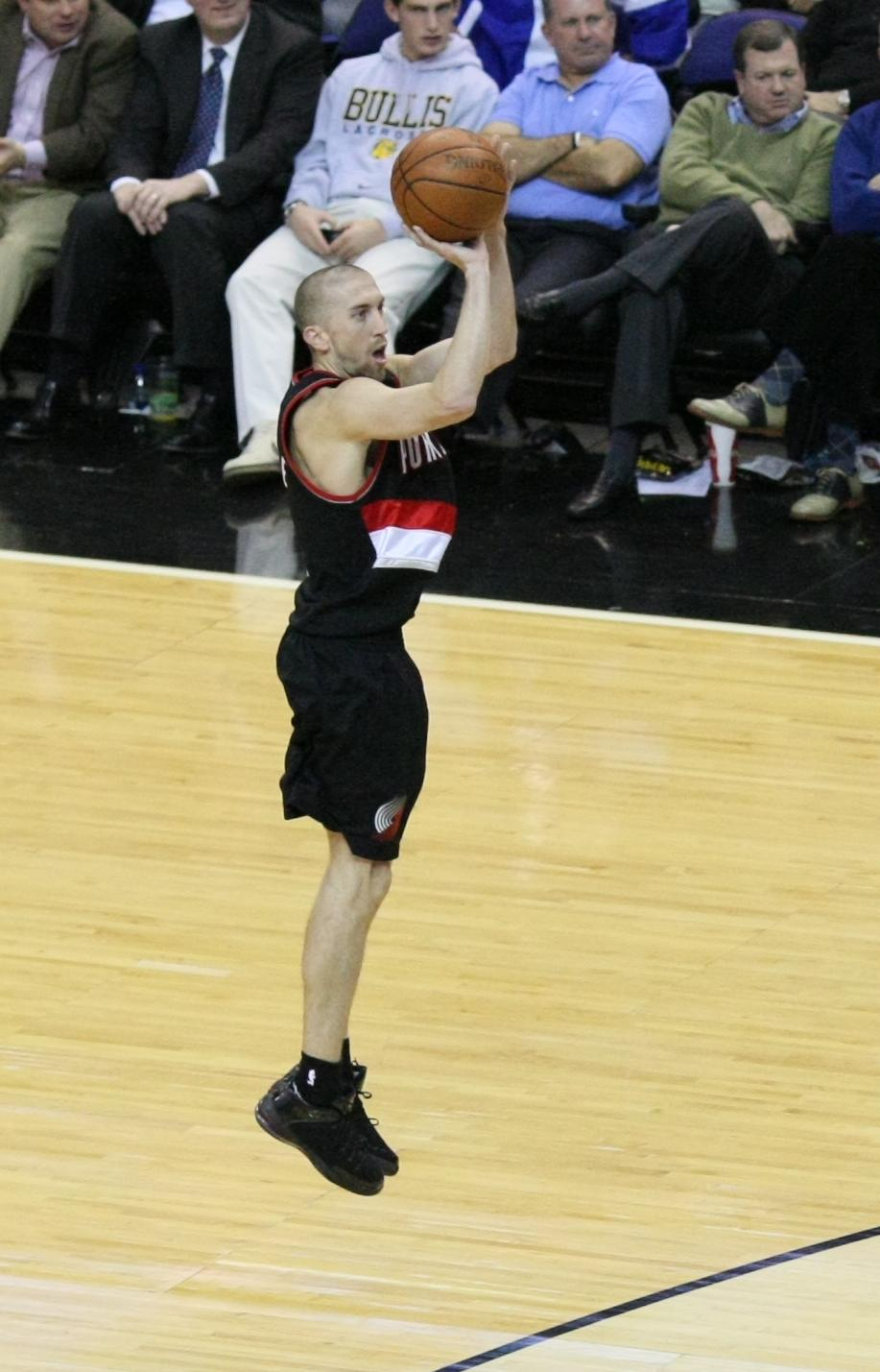
Steve Blake, Maryland (1999–2003)

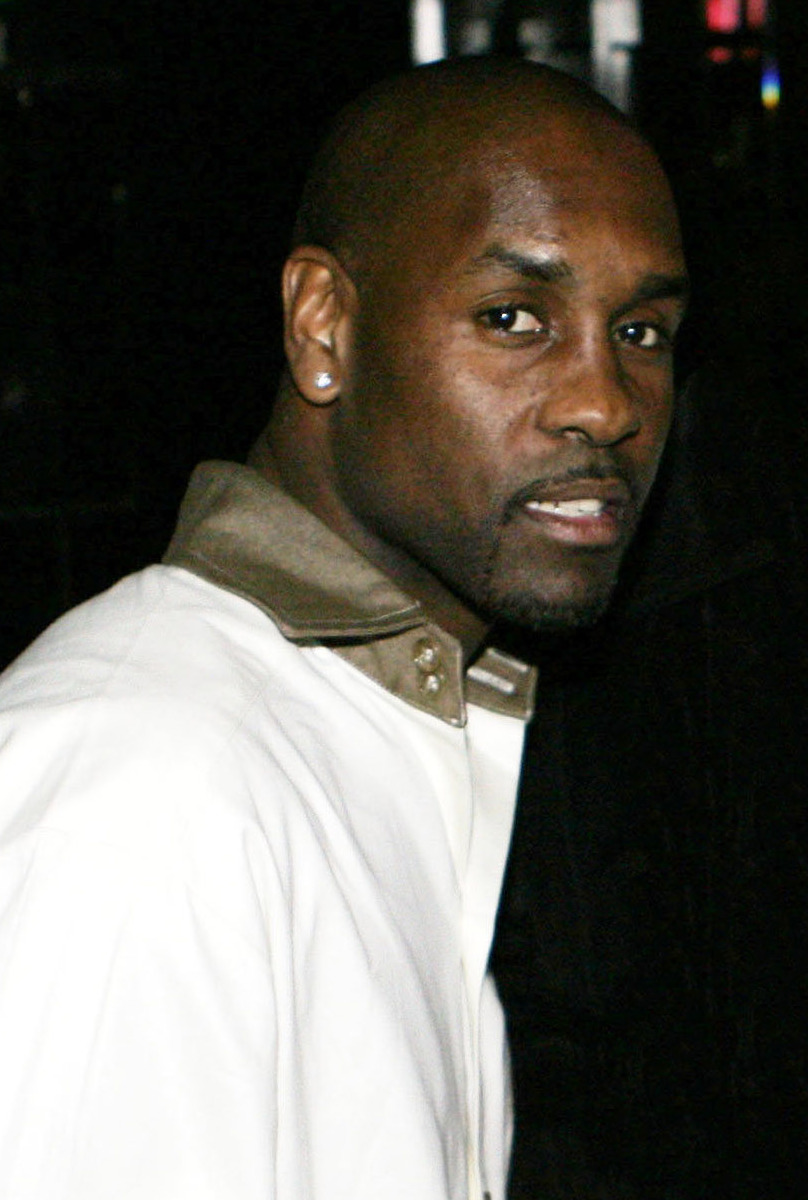
Gary Payton, Oregon State (1986–1990)

Player	Pos.	Team	Career start	Career end	Games played	Assists	APG	Ref.
Braden Smith	G	Purdue	2022	2026	149	1,103	7.40	
Bobby Hurley	G	Duke	1989	1993	140	1,076	7.68	
Chris Corchiani	G	NC State	1987	1991	124	1,038	8.37	
Ed Cota	G	North Carolina	1996	2000	138	1,030	7.46	
Jason Brickman	G	LIU Brooklyn	2010	2014	130	1,009	7.76	
Keith Jennings	G	East Tennessee State	1987	1991	127	983	7.74	
Steve Blake	G	Maryland	1999	2003	138	972	7.04	
Sherman Douglas	G	Syracuse	1985	1989	138	960	6.95	
Tony Miller	G	Marquette	1991	1995	123	956	7.77	
Aaron Miles	G	Kansas	2001	2005	138	954	6.91	
Greg Anthony	G	Portland / UNLV	1987	1991	138	950	6.88	
Doug Gottlieb	G	Notre Dame / Oklahoma State	1995	2000	124	947	7.63	
Gary Payton*	G	Oregon State	1986	1990	120	939	7.82	
D. J. Cooper	G	Ohio	2009	2013	143	934	6.53	
Kameron Langley^{C}	G	North Carolina A&T	2017	2022	148	902	6.09	
Orlando Smart	G	San Francisco	1990	1994	116	902	7.77	
Andre LaFleur	G	Northeastern	1983	1987	128	894	6.98	
Chico Fletcher	G	Arkansas State	1996	2000	114	893	7.83	
Cassius Winston	G	Michigan State	2016	2020	139	890	6.40	
Jim Les	G	Cleveland State / Bradley	1982	1986	118	884	7.49	
Frank Smith	G	Old Dominion	1984	1988	120	883	7.35	
Ryan Nembhard	G	Creighton / Gonzaga	2021	2025	134	882	6.58	
Scott Machado	G	Iona	2008	2012	132	880	6.66	
Yuri Collins	G	Saint Louis	2019	2023	116	878	7.56	
Taurence Chisholm	G	Delaware	1984	1988	110	877	7.97	
