= 2019 FIBA Under-16 Americas Championship =

6th FIBA Under-16 American Basketball Championship

Tournament details
- Host country: Brazil
- City: Belém
- Dates: 3–9 June
- Teams: 8 (from 1 confederation)
- Venue(s): 1 (in 1 host city)

Final positions
- Champions: United States (6th title)
- Runners-up: Canada
- Third place: Dominican Republic

Tournament statistics
- MVP: (United States) Chris Livingston
- Top scorer: (Dominican Republic) Montero (30.3)
- Top rebounds: (Brazil) Bolis (14.8)
- Top assists: (Canada) Nembhard (9.0)
- PPG (Team): United States (99.2)
- RPG (Team): United States (60.3)
- APG (Team): United States (24.0)

Official website
- 2019 FIBA U16 Americas Championship

The 2019 FIBA Under-16 Americas Championship was the men's international basketball competition that was held in Belém, Brazil from 3 to 9 June 2019. The top four teams qualified for the 2020 FIBA Under-17 Basketball World Cup in Bulgaria.

== Qualification ==
Competition	Dates	Host	Vacancies	Qualified
Automatic qualification			2	Canada; United States
2018 FIBA U15 South American Championship	6–11 November 2018	(Uruguay) Montevideo	3	Brazil; Uruguay; Argentina
2018 Centrobasket U15 Championship	11–16 December 2018	(Mexico) Hermosillo	3	Dominican Republic; Mexico; Puerto Rico

== Draw ==
The draw was held on 30 April 2019 in San Juan, Puerto Rico.

Pot 1	Pot 2	Pot 3	Pot 4
Canada; United States	Mexico; Uruguay	Argentina; Puerto Rico	Brazil; Dominican Republic

== Group phase ==
All times are local (UTC−3).

=== Group A ===
Pos	Team	Pld	W	L	PF	PA	PD	Pts	Qualification
1	United States	3	3	0	309	180	+129	6	Quarterfinals
2	Dominican Republic	3	2	1	232	265	−33	5	Quarterfinals
3	Argentina	3	1	2	218	248	−30	4	Quarterfinals
4	Mexico	3	0	3	193	259	−66	3	Quarterfinals

Source: FIBA

3 June 2019
15:45

Boxscore

Mexico	66–71	Dominican Republic
Scoring by quarter: 28–17, 13–15, 15–20, 10–19
Pts: Bonilla 14; Rebs: Bonilla 14; Asts: Bonilla 6		Pts: Montero 15; Rebs: García 14; Asts: Tejada 12

Arena Guilherme Paraense, Belém
Referees: Jesed Díaz (PUR), Michael Reed Scott (CAN), Gonzalo Salgueiro Marti (URU)

3 June 2019
18:15

Boxscore

Argentina	57–83	United States
Scoring by quarter: 20–7, 11–24, 16–29, 10–23
Pts: Caffaro 14; Rebs: Romegialli 5 Asts: Gorosito, Maglietti 3		Pts: Smith 22; Rebs: Isaacs, Smith 9 Asts: Lipsey 5

Arena Guilherme Paraense, Belém
Referees: Marcos Benito (BRA), Carlos Andres Peralta Ortega (ECU), Felipe Ibarra (CHI)

4 June 2019
13:30

Boxscore

United States	104–52	Mexico
Scoring by quarter: 19–15, 35–13, 30–8, 20–16
Pts: Bailey 21; Rebs: Duren 17; Asts: Hunter, Bailey 6		Pts: three players 10; Rebs: Ceballos 7 Asts: De la Garza 3

Arena Guilherme Paraense, Belém
Referees: Jesed Díaz (PUR), Felipe Guillermo Valenzuela Barrera (CHI), Gonzalo Salgueiro Marti (URU)

4 June 2019
18:15

Boxscore

Dominican Republic	90–77	Argentina
Scoring by quarter: 22–23, 20–11, 24–24, 24–19
Pts: Montero 42; Rebs: Montero 11; Asts: Cuevas 6		Pts: Rovares 29; Rebs: Rovares 11; Asts: Maglietti 6

Arena Guilherme Paraense, Belém
Referees: Marcos Benito (BRA), Michael Reed Scott (CAN), Felipe Ibarra (CHI)

5 June 2019
13:30

Boxscore

United States	122–71	Dominican Republic
Scoring by quarter: 35–22, 24–22, 28–11, 35–16
Pts: Max Christie 24; Rebs: Livingston 11; Asts: Isaacs 11		Pts: Montero 21; Rebs: Montero 11; Asts: Montero, Cuevas 3

Arena Guilherme Paraense, Belém
Referees: Jesed Díaz (PUR), Marcos Benito (BRA), Felipe Valenzuela (CHI)

5 June 2019
15:45

Boxscore

Mexico	75–84	Argentina
Scoring by quarter: 14–21, 16–25, 28–20, 17–18
Pts: Ceballos 20; Rebs: Bonilla 21; Asts: Bonilla 6		Pts: Caffaro, Conrradi 15; Rebs: Roveres 8 Asts: Maglietti 5

Arena Guilherme Paraense, Belém
Referees: Julio Anaya (PAN), Michael Scott (CAN), Gonzalo Salgueiro (URU)

=== Group B ===
Pos	Team	Pld	W	L	PF	PA	PD	Pts	Qualification
1	Canada	3	3	0	287	206	+81	6	Quarterfinals
2	Uruguay	3	1	2	189	225	−36	4 (Note: Uruguay 1–1, +2PD; Brazil 1–1, +1PD; Puerto Rico 1–1, –3PD)	Quarterfinals
3	Brazil (H)	3	1	2	194	216	−22	4	Quarterfinals
4	Puerto Rico	3	1	2	203	226	−23	4	Quarterfinals

Source: FIBA
(H) Hosts
Notes:

3 June 2019
13:30

Boxscore

Canada	101–63	Uruguay
Scoring by quarter: 23–21, 22–15, 29–20, 27–7
Pts: Sharpe 18; Rebs: Kalambay 7 Asts: Nembhard 8		Pts: Ubal 16; Rebs: Previatti 6 Asts: Pérez 5

Arena Guilherme Paraense, Belém
Referees: Grant Alexander Todey (USA), Felipe Guillermo Valenzuela Barrera (CHI), Romina Belén Morales Ibarra (ARG)

3 June 2019
20:30

Boxscore

Brazil	72–58	Puerto Rico
Scoring by quarter: 17–14, 18–13, 16–18, 21–13
Pts: Leoni 18; Rebs: Bolis 16; Asts: Motta 6		Pts: Walker 20; Rebs: Rivera 8 Asts: Figueroa, Rivera 2

Arena Guilherme Paraense, Belém
Referees: Julio Cesar Anaya Freile (PAN), Krishna Joaquin Dominguez Viveros (MEX), Natalia Cuello Cuello (DOM)

4 June 2019
15:45

Boxscore

Uruguay	58–69	Puerto Rico
Scoring by quarter: 8–18, 17–19, 21–8, 12–24
Pts: Ubal 30; Rebs: Ubal 13; Asts: Bessio 4		Pts: Walker 16; Rebs: Walker 8 Asts: Figueroa 6

Arena Guilherme Paraense, Belém
Referees: Julio Cesar Anaya Freile (PAN), Krishna Joaquin Dominguez Viveros (MEX), Romina Belén Morales Ibarra (ARG)

4 June 2019
20:30

Boxscore

Canada	90–67	Brazil
Scoring by quarter: 27–15, 17–19, 25–21, 21–12
Pts: Houstan 28; Rebs: Houstan 10; Asts: Nembhard 9		Pts: Leoni 14; Rebs: Bolis 13; Asts: Motta 4

Arena Guilherme Paraense, Belém
Referees: Carlos Andres Peralta Ortega (ECU), Natalia Cuello Cuello (DOM), Grant Alexander Todey (USA)

5 June 2019
18:15

Boxscore

Puerto Rico	76–96	Canada
Scoring by quarter: 9–15, 19–32, 18–32, 30–17
Pts: Sierra 14; Rebs: Cintrón, Santiago 8 Asts: Santiago, Sierra 3		Pts: Jackson 22; Rebs: Webley 8 Asts: Nembhard 9

Arena Guilherme Paraense, Belém
Referees: Carlos Peralta (ECU), Natalia Cuello (DOM), Romina Morales (ARG)

5 June 2019
20:30

Boxscore

Brazil	55–68	Uruguay
Scoring by quarter: 14–11, 12–15, 12–30, 17–12
Pts: Bolis 18; Rebs: Bolis 11; Asts: Capela 3		Pts: Ubal 24; Rebs: Pérez 11; Asts: Bessio 3

Arena Guilherme Paraense, Belém
Referees: Krishna Domínguez (MEX), Felipe Ibarra (CHI), Grant Todey (USA)

== Knockout stage ==
=== Bracket ===
Fifth place
Puerto Rico	61
Brazil	78
Seventh place
Uruguay	68
Mexico	74

5–8th place semifinals
Puerto Rico	65
Uruguay	40
Brazil	64
Mexico	62

Quarterfinals
1A	United States	102
4B	Puerto Rico	51
2B	Uruguay	53
3A	Argentina	62
2A	Dominican Republic	73
3B	Brazil	71
1B	Canada	95
4A	Mexico	78

Semifinals
United States	90
Argentina	58
Dominican Republic	81
Canada	97

Final
United States	94
Canada	77
Third place
Argentina	77
Dominican Republic	80

=== Quarterfinals ===
7 June 2019
13:30

Boxscore

Canada	95–78	Mexico
Scoring by quarter: 26–15, 18–24, 25–14, 26–25
Pts: Houstan 21; Rebs: Boakye 17; Asts: Nembhard 7		Pts: Bonilla 27; Rebs: Bonilla 20; Asts: Bonilla 5

Arena Guilherme Paraense, Belém
Referees: Jesed Díaz (PUR), Romina Bélen Morales Ibarra (ARG), Gonzalo Salgueiro Marti (URU)

7 June 2019
15:45

Boxscore

United States	102–51	Puerto Rico
Scoring by quarter: 13–14, 29–8, 32–13, 28–16
Pts: Smith 15; Rebs: Wright 10; Asts: Hunter 7		Pts: Navarro 12; Rebs: Walker 8 Asts: Figueroa 4

Arena Guilherme Paraense, Belém
Referees: Natalia Cuello Cuello (DOM), Felipe Ibarra (CHI), Felipe Guillermo Valenzuela Barrera (CHI)

7 June 2019
18:15

Boxscore

Uruguay	53–62	Argentina
Scoring by quarter: 8–16, 16–11, 14–16, 17–19
Pts: Bessio, Ubal 13; Rebs: Rodríguez, Ubal 8 Asts: Bessio 4		Pts: Conrradi 25; Rebs: Romegialli 8 Asts: Maglietti 5

Arena Guilherme Paraense, Belém
Referees: Marcos Benito (BRA), Michael Scott (CAN), Krishna Domínguez (MEX)

7 June 2019
20:30

Boxscore

Dominican Republic	73–71	Brazil
Scoring by quarter: 21–24, 17–21, 16–22, 19–14
Pts: Montero 26; Rebs: Pimentel, Ynfante 8 Asts: Montero 7		Pts: Bolis 20; Rebs: Bolis 23; Asts: Leoni 5

Arena Guilherme Paraense, Belém
Referees: Carlos Peralta (ECU), Grant Todey (USA), Julio Anaya (PAN)

=== 5–8th place semifinals ===
8 June 2019
13:30

Boxscore

Puerto Rico	65–40	Uruguay
Scoring by quarter: 6–16, 21–10, 23–5, 15–9
Pts: Walker 20; Rebs: Walker 8 Asts: Walker 5		Pts: Ubal 13; Rebs: Previatti 11; Asts: Brun 3

Arena Guilherme Paraense, Belém
Referees: Michael Reed Scott (CAN), Natalia Cuello Cuello (DOM), Romina Belén Morales Ibarra (ARG)

8 June 2019
15:45

Boxscore

Brazil	64–62	Mexico
Scoring by quarter: 15–11, 10–14, 21–14, 18–23
Pts: Vicenti 18; Rebs: Bolis 13; Asts: Ibiapina 4		Pts: Ceballos 17; Rebs: Bonilla, Acevedo 10; Asts: four players 3

Arena Guilherme Paraense, Belém
Referees: Grant Alexander Todey (USA), Felipe Guillermo Valenzuela Barrera (CHI), Gonzalo Salgueiro Marti (URU)

=== Semifinals ===
8 June 2019
18:15

Boxscore

Dominican Republic	81–97	Canada
Scoring by quarter: 16–30, 21–12, 24–31, 20–24
Pts: Montero 29; Rebs: Montero 10; Asts: Grullón 5		Pts: Houstan 29; Rebs: Boakye 16; Asts: Nembhard 12

Arena Guilherme Paraense, Belém
Referees: Marcos Benito (BRA), Jesed Díaz (PUR), Felipe Ibarra (CHI)

8 June 2019
20:30

Boxscore

United States	90–58	Argentina
Scoring by quarter: 22–15, 25–17, 21–12, 22–14
Pts: Smith 18; Rebs: Livingston 12; Asts: Hunter, Lipsey 4		Pts: Sigismonti 18; Rebs: Maglietti 9 Asts: Gorosito, Maglietti 4

Arena Guilherme Paraense, Belém
Referees: Carlos Peralta (ECU), Krishna Domínguez (MEX), Julio Anaya (PAN)

=== Seventh place game ===
9 June 2019
13:30

Boxscore

Uruguay	68–74	Mexico
Scoring by quarter: 7–19, 14–12, 27–18, 20–25
Pts: Ubal 20; Rebs: Gentile 8 Asts: Bessio, Brun 4		Pts: Bonilla 23; Rebs: Bonilla 15; Asts: Bonilla, Ochoa 7

Arena Guilherme Paraense, Belém
Referees: Felipe Ibarra (CHI), Felipe Guillermo Valenzuela Barrera (CHI), Romina Belén Morales Ibarra (ARG)

=== Fifth place game ===
9 June 2019
15:45

Boxscore

Puerto Rico	61–78	Brazil
Scoring by quarter: 11–13, 22–13, 18–17, 10–35
Pts: Figueroa 15; Rebs: Rivera 10; Asts: Figueroa 6		Pts: Motta 31; Rebs: Bolis 13; Asts: Leoni 7

Arena Guilherme Paraense, Belém
Referees: Grant Alexander Todey (USA), Natalia Cuello Cuello (DOM), Gonzalo Salgueiro Marti (URU)

=== Third place game ===
9 June 2019
18:15

Boxscore

Argentina	77–80	Dominican Republic
Scoring by quarter: 9–16, 21–22, 22–16, 25–26
Pts: Caffaro 22; Rebs: Caffaro 12; Asts: Di Muccio 6		Pts: Montero 49; Rebs: Montero 12; Asts: Cuevas 3

Arena Guilherme Paraense, Belém
Referees: Marcos Benito (BRA), Michael Scott (CAN), Jesed Díaz (PUR)

=== Final ===
9 June 2019
20:30

Boxscore

United States	94–77	Canada
Scoring by quarter: 18–17, 27–15, 27–25, 22–20
Pts: Livingston 23; Rebs: Smith 9 Asts: three players 4		Pts: Houstan 25; Rebs: Boakye 13; Asts: Nembhard 9

Arena Guilherme Paraense, Belém
Referees: Carlos Peralta (ECU), Krishna Domínguez (MEX), Julio Anaya (PAN)

== Final ranking ==
Qualified for the 2020 FIBA Under-17 Basketball World Cup.

Rank	Team	Record
1st place, gold medalist(s)	United States	6–0
2nd place, silver medalist(s)	Canada	5–1
3rd place, bronze medalist(s)	Dominican Republic	4–2
4	Argentina	2–4
5	Brazil	3–3
6	Puerto Rico	2–4
7	Mexico	1–5
8	Uruguay	1–5
