= Jalan West =

American basketball player (born 1993)

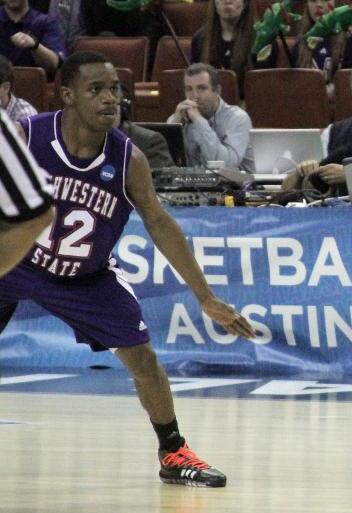
- West in 2013

Personal information
- Born: April 12, 1993 (age 33) Bossier City, Louisiana, U.S.
- Listed height: 5 ft 11 in (1.80 m)
- Listed weight: 175 lb (79 kg)

Career information
- High school: Bossier (Bossier City, Louisiana)
- College: Northwestern State (2012–2018)
- NBA draft: 2018: undrafted
- Position: Point guard

Career highlights
- NCAA assists leader (2015); 2× First-team All-Southland (2014, 2015); Southland Defensive Player of the Year (2014); 3× Southland All-Defensive Team (2013–2015); Southland Freshman of the Year (2013)

Jalan Dominique West (born April 12, 1993) is an American basketball player. He played college basketball at Northwestern State University where he was considered one of the top defenders in the Southland Conference, having been named to three all-conference defensive teams.

== High school career ==
West attended Bossier High School in Bossier City, Louisiana. As a Junior in 2009–10, he averaged 15 points, 4.5 assist, 2 rebounds per game. Coming out of high school West was rated the No. 2 prospect in the state of Louisiana by most recruiting services. As a Senior in 2010–11, West led Bossier to a LHSAA State Championship in 2011 with a (33–2) season. He also played AAU basketball for Louisiana-Select alongside future NBA players Langston Galloway and Markel Brown.

West was a three-time All district selection and back-to-back state finalist in 2009 and 2010. As a senior, West averaged 16 points, 5 assist, 4.7 rebounds, and 3 steals per game. After his senior year, he chose to play college basketball for Northwestern State University.

== College career ==
=== Freshman season (2011–2012) ===
West redshirted as a freshman in 2011 because of NCAA Clearinghouse issues.

=== Redshirt Freshman year (2012–2013) ===
As a freshman, West helped lead Northwestern State to an NCAA tournament appearance while being named Southland Conference Freshman of the Year after the Demons won the Southland Conference tournament as the No. 4 seed. NSU finished the season fourth in the conference. West was also named All-Southland Honorable Mention and All-Southland Defensive Team. West appeared in 37 games for the Demons, where he averaged 10.2 points, 5.1 assists, and 2.1 steals per-game during the season.

=== Sophomore year (2013–2014) ===
On November 15, 2013, West scored 30 points and 9 rebounds in a 111–92 win over Auburn. On November 30, 2013, West tallied 20 points and 10 assist in a 107–100 victory against Niagara. On December 23, 2013, West was named Southland Conference player of the week. On January 23, 2014, West put up 28 and 5 assist in a 76–68 win over Central Arkansas. On January 30, 2014, West poured in 27 points in a 100–86 win against Incarnate Word. On February 7, 2014, West scored 30 points and 8 assist in a 85–74 victory over McNeese State. On March 1, 2014, West scored 24 points and 6 assist in a 84–71 win against UNO. On March 6, 2014, West scored 26 points and 5 assist in a 119–102 victory over Central Arkansas. During the season, West was the only player in the nation to average at least 19 points, 6 assists, 2.5 steals and 4 rebounds per game. He was the first player since former NBA player and Holftra star Speedy Claxton did it during the 1999–2000 season. West had a couple of big games during the season which came against some of the nation's top ranked teams. One of them was against No. 12-ranked Baylor where West had 26 points, 7 rebounds, 8 assist and made a three-point field goal to force overtime. Another came against No. 15-ranked Memphis. West recorded 15 points, 9 assists, and 5 steals in that game. West was named the Southland Conference Defensive Player of the Year. He appeared in 31 games and averaged 19.2 points, 6.1 assist, and 2.5 steals per game.

=== Junior year (2014–2015) ===
In his junior season, West led the nation in assist (7.7 per game). West recorded a career-best 54 points against the University of New Orleans. West's buzzer beater against UNO was featured on ESPN's Sportscenter Top Plays of the Week which was voted No. 2 on Sportscenter's list for February 1. During the season West averaged 20.0 points per game.

==== Senior year injury (2015–2016) ====
On November 16, 2015, West earned Southland Conference player of the week honors. During the first game of his senior season against Ole Miss, West tore his anterior cruciate ligament (ACL), causing him to miss the entire season. He had surgery to repair his ACL in December 2015. Without West, the Demons finished 8–20 on the season and missed the Southland Conference tournament in the process.

After the 2015–16 season, West was granted a sixth year of eligibility by the National Collegiate Athletic Association (NCAA). In August 2016, he sustained a second serious knee injury, which caused him to miss the entire season.

=== 7th year senior year (2017–2018) ===
Northwestern State applied for a seventh-year waiver for West and was approved, a rare feat that was only accomplished three other times in the NCAA before that point. West made his return for Northwestern State on November 17, where he scored 4 points and 4 assist in an 87–65 loss to Rice University. On November 21, 2017 West recorded 16 points, 4 assist, and 3 steals in a 76–61 victory over the ULM Warhawks. On December 9, West scored 14 points and 9 assist in an 88–58 win against Louisiana College. On January 27, 2018, it was announced West's college career at Northwestern State have come to an end, due to West not enrolling before the deadline for spring semester classes. West only played in eight games during the season where he averaged 12.3 points and 4.8 assists per game.

== Accomplishments and awards ==
College

- NCAA assists leader (2015)
- 2x All-Southland First team (2014), (2015)
- 2x NABC All-District First team (2014), (2015)
- Southland All- Tournament team (2014)
- Southland Conference Defensive Player of the year (2014)
- 3x Southland All-Defensive team (2013), (2014), (2015)
- Southland Conference Honorable Mention (2013)
- Southland Conference Freshman of the year (2013)

High School

- LHSAA State Championship (2011)

== Personal life ==
West is the son of Janice West and George Hairston. West has three brothers, Demetrius who served in the United States Navy, Jarrien who served in the United States Army, and a younger brother, Jordan who all share the same father. He also has three sisters, Aniesha, Shaquita, and Keandra West. On May 6, 2016, West graduated from Northwestern State.
