= Agustín Ubal =

Uruguayan basketball player (born 2003)

- Ubal with FC Barcelona in 2026

No. 10 – FC Barcelona
- Position: Guard / small forward
- League: Liga ACB; EuroLeague

Personal information
- Born: July 19, 2003 (age 23) Montevideo, Uruguay
- Listed height: 2.03 m (6 ft 8 in)

Career information
- Playing career: 2020–present

Career history
- 2020–2024: FC Barcelona
- 2020–2022: →FC Barcelona B
- 2022: →Río Breogán
- 2022–2023: →Bilbao
- 2023–2024: →Palencia
- 2024–2025: Granada
- 2025–2026: Manresa
- 2026–present: FC Barcelona

Agustín Ubal Agostini (born July 19, 2003) is a Uruguayan professional basketball player for FC Barcelona of the Liga ACB and the EuroLeague. Standing at 6 ft 8 inches (2.03 m), Ubal can play as a guard and small forward. He also has Italian citizenship.

== Early life and youth career ==
Born in Montevideo, Uruguay, Ubal played in the youth ranks of Club Malvín, a local basketball club. In 2019, Ubal left Uruguay to join the youth ranks of FC Barcelona at age 16. Malvín announced it would file a complaint to the FIBA as the club felt the transfer infringed federative and player development rights.

== Professional career ==
=== FC Barcelona (2020–2024) ===
During his first two seasons at Barcelona, Ubal played for the reserve team, FC Barcelona B, in the Liga EBA. During the 2021–22 season, Ubal made his Liga ACB debut with the senior team in a game against Real Betis. Ubal also made his EuroLeague debut during the 2021–22 season, in a game against ASVEL Basket in November.

On March 3, 2022, Ubal was loaned to Río Breogán, playing for the Galicians until the end of the 2021–22 ACB season.

On September 12, 2022, Ubal was announced as a new player by Bilbao Basket, where he would remain on loan until the end of the 2022–23 ACB season.

On September 14, 2023, Ubal was announced as a new player by Zunder Palencia, where he would remain on loan until the end of the 2023–24 ACB season.

At the end of the 2023–24 season, FC Barcelona decided not to extend Ubal's contract, bringing an end to his 5 years with the Catalan club.

=== Covirán Granada (2024–2025) ===
On June 19, 2024, Ubal signed with Covirán Granada of the Liga ACB. With Granada, Ubal averaged 4.9 points per game and 2.6 rebounds in 14.2 minutes, which were not enough to help the Andalusians avoid relegation at the end of the 2024–25 ACB season.

=== BAXI Manresa (2025–2026) ===
On June 20, 2025, Ubal signed with BAXI Manresa of the Liga ACB and EuroCup.

=== Return to FC Barcelona (2026–present) ===
On July 17, 2026, Ubal FC Barcelona of the Liga ACB and the EuroLeague. Returning two years after the end of his previous spell, Ubal signed a three-season deal.

== National team career ==
Ubal has represented Uruguay's youth ranks in several international tournaments, such as the 2019 U16 Americas Championship with the U16 Team.

Ubal made his debut for the senior Uruguayan national team against Paraguay in February 2021. At only 17 years of age, Ubal scored 20 points to help his country win the game.

== Career statistics ==
Legend
GP	Games played	GS	Games started	MPG	Minutes per game
FG%	Field-goal percentage	3P%	3-point field-goal percentage	FT%	Free-throw percentage
RPG	Rebounds per game	APG	Assists per game	SPG	Steals per game
BPG	Blocks per game	PPG	Points per game	PIR	Performance index rating
**Bold**	Career high

=== EuroCup ===
Year	Team	GP	GS	MPG	FG%	3P%	FT%	RPG	APG	SPG	BPG	PPG	PIR
2025–26	Manresa	17	4	19.5	.538	.316	.862	3.7	1.5	.7	.4	11.5	14.9
Career		17	4	19.5	.538	.316	.862	3.7	1.5	.7	.4	11.5	14.9

=== Domestic leagues ===
Year	Team	League	GP	MPG	FG%	3P%	FT%	RPG	APG	SPG	BPG	PPG
2022–23	(Spain) Bilbao	ACB	28	7.9	.304	.160	.645	.6	.6	.4	.2	2.6
2023–24	(Spain) Palencia	ACB	27	9.0	.400	.333	.786	1.5	.8	.1	.2	3.0
2024–25	(Spain) Granada	ACB	30	14.4	.398	.188	.814	2.6	.7	.9	.2	4.9
2025–26	(Spain) Manresa	ACB	31	19.1	.436	.303	.844	3.4	1.0	.8	.2	9.6
