= Kameron Langley =

American basketball player (born 1999)

Clemson Tigers
- Position: Graduate assistant
- League: ACC

Personal information
- Born: April 13, 1999 (age 27)
- Listed height: 6 ft 2 in (1.88 m)
- Listed weight: 165 lb (75 kg)

Career information
- High school: Southwest Guilford (High Point, North Carolina)
- College: North Carolina A&T (2017–2022)
- NBA draft: 2022: undrafted

Career history

Coaching
- 2024–present: Clemson (graduate assistant)

Career highlights
- NCAA assists leader (2020); First-team All-MEAC (2020); Second-team All-MEAC (2021); MEAC All-Freshman team (2018)

Kameron Langley (born April 13, 1999) is an American basketball coach and former player who is currently a graduate assistant at Clemson. He played college basketball for the North Carolina A&T Aggies, where in he led the nation in assists for the 2019–20 season.

== Early life ==
Langley grew up in Greensboro, North Carolina and attended Southwest Guilford High School where he was coached by Guy Shavers. Langley was named the Piedmont Triad Conference Player of the year as a sophomore and as a junior, when he averaged 15.6 points, 6.8 rebounds, 5.9 assists and 3.2 steals per game. Langley led the school to a 27–3 record and the regular season conference title. As a senior, he led the Cowboys to the 4A State Championship and was named the MVP of the state championship game against Leesville Road High School.

== College career ==
Langley became the Aggies' starting point guard as a true freshman and was named to the MEAC All-Freshman team after averaging 7.4 points, 3.3 rebounds and 5.1 assists per game and leading the conference with 59 steals. He averaged 7.1 points, a conference-leading 6.5 assists, 3.5 rebounds and 1.5 steals per game during his sophomore season. Langley broke North Carolina A&T's career assists record during a 10 point, 13 assist and eight rebound performance in an 83–62 win over Maryland Eastern Shore on February 25, 2020, passing the previous record of 582 held by Thomas Griffis. Langley set a MEAC men's basketball tournament tournament record with 15 assists while also setting the conference record of career assists in a quarterfinal win over Howard during the 2020 MEAC men's basketball tournament. Langley was named first team All-MEAC while leading the nation in total assists and assists per game. Langley averaged 9.4 points, 8 assists, and 5.2 rebounds per game. Following the season, he declared for the 2020 NBA draft. Langley withdrew from the draft on June 9. As a senior, he averaged 10.6 points, 6.6 assists, 5 rebounds and 2.7 steals per game, earning Second Team All-MEAC honors. Langley declared for the 2021 NBA draft, before withdrawing and taking advantage of the NCAA's granting of a fifth season of eligibility.

== Coaching career ==
Langley began his coaching career as graduate assistant for the Clemson Tigers men's basketball team in 2024.

== Career statistics ==
Legend
| GP | Games played | GS | Games started | MPG | Minutes per game |
| FG% | Field goal percentage | 3P% | 3-point field goal percentage | FT% | Free throw percentage |
| RPG | Rebounds per game | APG | Assists per game | SPG | Steals per game |
| BPG | Blocks per game | PPG | Points per game | **Bold** | Career high |

| * | Led NCAA Division I |

=== College ===
| Year | Team | GP | GS | MPG | FG% | 3P% | FT% | RPG | APG | SPG | BPG | PPG |
|---|---|---|---|---|---|---|---|---|---|---|---|---|
| 2017–18 | North Carolina A&T | **35** | **33** | 30.5 | **.515** | .357 | **.711** | 3.3 | 5.1 | 1.7 | **.1** | 7.4 |
| 2018–19 | North Carolina A&T | 32 | 29 | 27.7 | .456 | .280 | .562 | 3.5 | 6.5 | 1.5 | **.1** | 7.1 |
| 2019–20 | North Carolina A&T | 31 | 31 | **32.6** | .441 | .176 | .520 | **5.2** | **8.0*** | 2.1 | **.1** | 9.4 |
| 2020–21 | North Carolina A&T | 19 | 19 | 31.2 | .425 | **.400** | .640 | 5.0 | 6.6 | **2.7** | **.1** | **10.6** |
| 2021–22 | North Carolina A&T | 31 | 23 | 27.1 | .407 | .263 | .608 | 3.3 | 4.7 | 1.7 | **.1** | 6.3 |
| Career | | 148 | 135 | 29.7 | .449 | .306 | .595 | 3.9 | 6.1 | 1.9 | .1 | 7.9 |

== Personal life ==
Langley has three brothers, all of whom have played college basketball in the Greensboro area. His older brother KJ was the starting point guard for Greensboro College and he has two younger twin brothers, Keyshaun and Kobe, who originally committed to play together at Virginia Tech before de-committing and choosing to play at UNC Greensboro.

== See also ==
- List of NCAA Division I men's basketball season assists leaders
- List of NCAA Division I men's basketball career assists leaders
