= Chris Livingston =

American basketball player (born 2003)

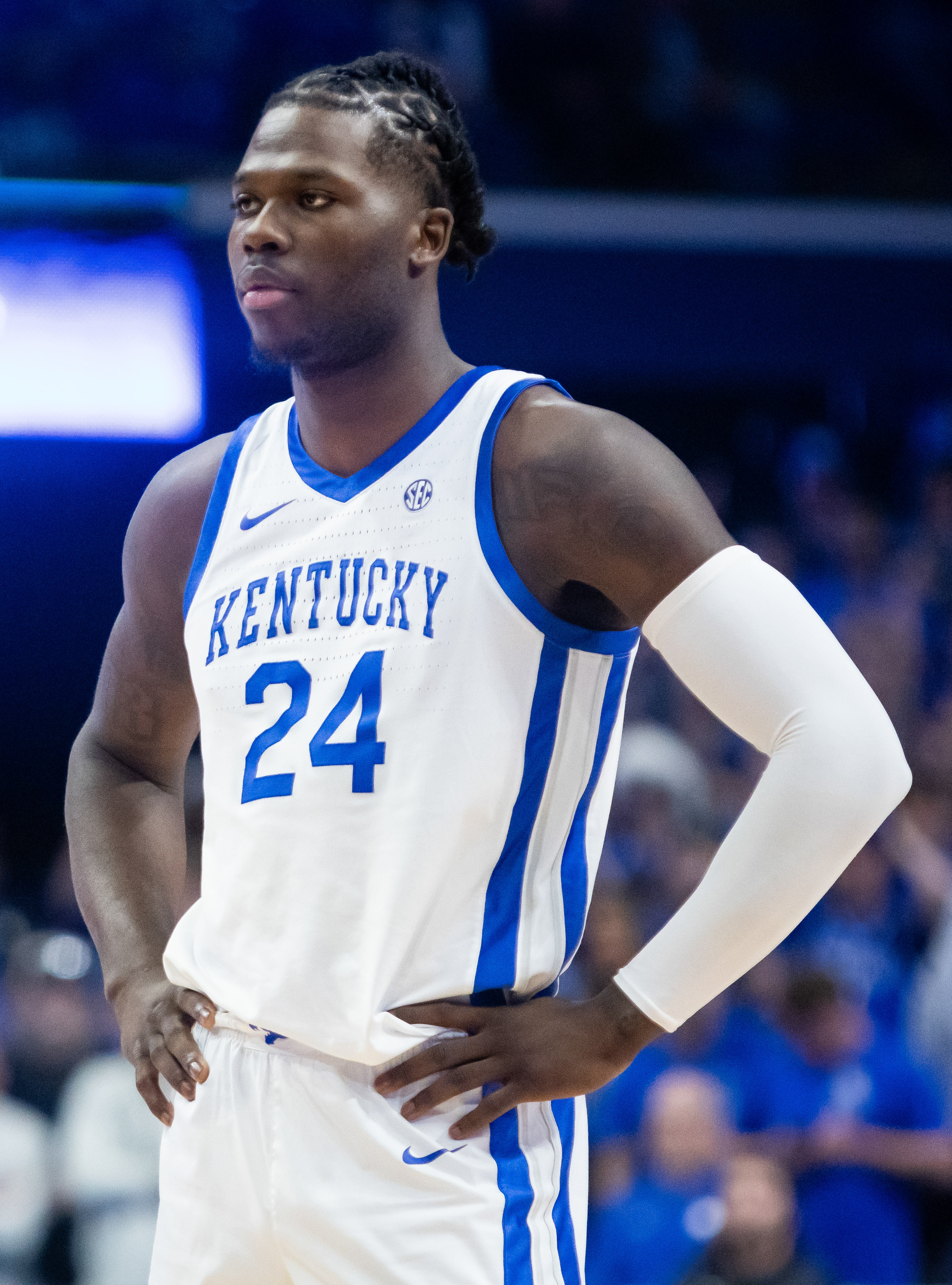
- Livingston with Kentucky in 2023

No. 7 – Capital City Go-Go
- Position: Small forward
- League: NBA G League

Personal information
- Born: October 15, 2003 (age 23) Akron, Ohio, U.S.
- Listed height: 6 ft 6 in (1.98 m)
- Listed weight: 220 lb (100 kg)

Career information
- High school: Buchtel (Akron, Ohio); Western Reserve Academy (Hudson, Ohio); Oak Hill Academy (Mouth of Wilson, Virginia)
- College: Kentucky (2022–2023)
- NBA draft: 2023: 2nd round, 58th overall pick
- Drafted by: Milwaukee Bucks
- Playing career: 2023–present

Career history
- 2023–2025: Milwaukee Bucks
- 2023–2025: →Wisconsin Herd
- 2025–2026: Cleveland Cavaliers
- 2025–2026: →Cleveland Charge
- 2026–present: Capital City Go-Go

Career highlights
- NBA Cup champion (2024); SEC All-Freshman Team (2023); McDonald's All-American (2022); FIBA Americas Under-16 Championship MVP (2019)
- Stats at NBA.com
- Stats at Basketball Reference
Medals
Men's basketball
Representing the United States
FIBA Americas U16 Championship
Gold medal – first place	2019 Brazil	Team

Christopher Michael Livingston (born October 15, 2003) is an American professional basketball player for the Capital City Go-Go of the NBA G League. He played college basketball for the Kentucky Wildcats. He was a consensus five-star recruit and one of the top players in the 2022 class.

== Early life and high school career ==
Livingston was born and raised in Akron, Ohio. He started playing competitive basketball at age five. As a freshman, he played for Buchtel Community Learning Center in Akron, averaging 24.7 points, 5.2 rebounds and 1.8 blocks per game. Livingston led his team to its first state final four appearance since 1997 and became the highest-scoring freshman in school history. For his sophomore season, he transferred to Western Reserve Academy in Hudson, Ohio. In his season finale, Livingston recorded 50 points, 20 rebounds, eight steals and five blocks in a 76–65 win over Bristol High School. As a sophomore, he averaged 32.5 points, 12.4 rebounds, 3.2 assists, 2.9 steals and 1.4 blocks per game, earning MaxPreps Sophomore All-American first team honors.

As a junior back at Buchtel, Livingston averaged 31.1 points, 15.8 rebounds, 6.1 assists, 4.7 steals and 4.0 blocks per game. He averaged 18.2 points, 9.1 rebounds, 3.9 assists and 1.9 steals per game during his senior season at Oak Hill Academy in Mouth of Wilson, Virginia.

=== Recruiting ===
Livingston was a consensus five-star recruit and one of the top players in the 2022 class, according to major recruiting services. He held multiple college basketball scholarship offers before entering high school. Livingston was offered by Ohio State at age 14. On September 15, 2021, he committed to playing college basketball for Kentucky over offers from Georgetown and Tennessee State.

College recruiting
Name	Hometown	School	Height	Weight	Commit date
Chris Livingston; SF	Akron, OH	Oak Hill Academy (VA)	6 ft 6 in (1.98 m)	200 lb (91 kg)	Sep 15, 2021
Chris Livingston; SF	Recruit ratings: Rivals: 247Sports: ESPN: (92)				
Overall recruit ranking: Rivals: 11 247Sports: 16 ESPN: 12
Note: In many cases, Scout, Rivals, 247Sports, On3, and ESPN may conflict in their listings of height and weight.; In these cases, the average was taken. ESPN grades are on a 100-point scale.; Sources: "Kentucky 2022 Basketball Commitments". Rivals.; "2022 Kentucky Wildcats Recruiting Class". ESPN.; "2022 Team Ranking". Rivals.

== College career ==
As a freshman at Kentucky in 2022–23, Livingston played in 34 games and made 26 starts, averaging 6.3 points and 4.2 rebounds in 22.4 minutes per game. He was named to the Southeastern Conference All-Freshman Team.

== Professional career ==
Livingston was drafted by the Milwaukee Bucks as the last and 58th pick of the 2023 NBA draft. On July 9, 2023, he signed a contract with the Bucks. Throughout his rookie and sophomore seasons, he was assigned several times to the Wisconsin Herd of the NBA G League. Livingston made 21 appearances for Milwaukee during the 2024–25 NBA season, averaging 1.4 points, 1.7 rebounds, and 0.2 assists. After being waived by the Bucks on July 2, 2025, he later re-signed with the team on July 16. Livingston was waived by the Bucks for a second time on October 16.

On October 31, 2025, Livingston signed a two-way contract with the Cleveland Cavaliers. He made three appearances for the Cavaliers, averaging 3.0 points, 1.0 rebound, and 0.3 assists. On January 27, 2026, Livingston was waived shortly after sustaining a hand injury that would keep him inactive for several weeks.

== National team career ==
Livingston played for the United States at the 2019 FIBA Under-16 Americas Championship in Belém, Brazil. He led his team to the gold medal, recording 23 points, six rebounds and two assists in a 94–77 win over Canada in the final. Livingston was named tournament most valuable player and made the all-tournament team.

== Career statistics ==
Legend
GP	Games played	GS	Games started	MPG	Minutes per game
FG%	Field goal percentage	3P%	3-point field goal percentage	FT%	Free throw percentage
RPG	Rebounds per game	APG	Assists per game	SPG	Steals per game
BPG	Blocks per game	PPG	Points per game	**Bold**	Career high

=== NBA ===
==== Regular season ====
Year	Team	GP	GS	MPG	FG%	3P%	FT%	RPG	APG	SPG	BPG	PPG
2023–24	Milwaukee	**21**	0	4.3	.500	.200	.750	1.0	.2	.1	.0	1.2
2024–25	Milwaukee	**21**	**1**	5.0	.333	.000	.750	**1.7**	.2	.2	.0	1.4
2025–26	Cleveland	3	0	**5.7**	**.571**	.000	**1.000**	1.0	**.3**	**.3**	.0	**3.0**
Career		45	1	4.8	.429	.063	.762	1.3	.2	.2	.0	1.4

==== Playoffs ====
Year	Team	GP	GS	MPG	FG%	3P%	FT%	RPG	APG	SPG	BPG	PPG
2024	Milwaukee	2	0	3.1	1.000	—	.000	.0	.0	.0	.0	1.0
Career		2	0	3.1	1.000	—	.000	.0	.0	.0	.0	1.0

=== College ===
Year	Team	GP	GS	MPG	FG%	3P%	FT%	RPG	APG	SPG	BPG	PPG
2022–23	Kentucky	34	26	22.4	.429	.305	.722	4.2	.7	.4	.4	6.3

== Personal life ==
Livingston has a twin brother, Cordell, who has been his high school basketball teammate at Oak Hill Academy, Buchtel, and Western Reserve Academy.
