= Yuri Collins =

American basketball player (born 2001)

No. 1 – Memphis Hustle
- Position: Point guard
- League: NBA G League

Personal information
- Born: March 7, 2001 (age 25) St. Louis, Missouri, U.S.
- Listed height: 6 ft 0 in (1.83 m)
- Listed weight: 190 lb (86 kg)

Career information
- High school: St. Mary's (St. Louis, Missouri)
- College: Saint Louis (2019–2023)
- NBA draft: 2023: undrafted
- Playing career: 2023–present

Career history
- 2023–2025: Santa Cruz Warriors
- 2025: Golden State Warriors
- 2025: Scarborough Shooting Stars
- 2025: Long Island Nets
- 2025–2026: Ironi Ness Ziona
- 2026: NBA G League United
- 2026–present: Memphis Hustle

Career highlights
- FIBA Intercontinental Cup champion (2026); 2× NCAA assists leader (2022, 2023); 2× First-team All-Atlantic 10 (2022, 2023); Atlantic 10 All-Defensive Team (2022)
- Stats at NBA.com
- Stats at Basketball Reference

Yuri Keni Collins (born March 7, 2001) is an American professional basketball player for the Memphis Hustle of the NBA G League. He played college basketball for the Saint Louis Billikens of the Atlantic 10 Conference (A-10), and has played in the National Basketball Association (NBA) as a member of the Golden State Warriors.

== High school career ==
Collins attended St. Mary's High School. As a senior, he averaged 22.6 points, 5.4 rebounds and 7.6 assists per game. Collins led St. Mary's to the Class 4 state championship game, averaging over 30 points per game during the team's postseason run. He committed to play college basketball at Saint Louis over offers from DePaul, Iowa, Missouri, Missouri State and SMU.

== College career ==
As a freshman, he averaged 5.4 points and 5.5 assists per game, leading all freshmen in assists. Collins averaged 5.1 points, 2.8 rebounds, and 6.1 assists per game as a sophomore. He took on a leadership role for the Billikens as a junior due to an ACL tear suffered by Javonte Perkins. Collins was named to the First Team All-Atlantic 10 as well as the All-Defensive Team. He averaged 11.1 points, 4.1 rebounds and 7.9 assists per game, leading NCAA Division I in assists. Following the season, he entered the 2022 NBA draft and the transfer portal. Collins ultimately withdrew from the draft and returned to Saint Louis. On November 30, 2022, he recorded 20 assists in a win over Tennessee State, setting a school record and tying for the fourth-most in a single game in Division I history.

== Professional career ==
=== Santa Cruz / Golden State Warriors (2023–2025) ===
After going undrafted in the 2023 NBA draft, Collins joined the Golden State Warriors for the 2023 NBA Summer League and on October 16, he signed with them. However, he was waived two days later and on October 30, he joined the Santa Cruz Warriors.

After joining them for the 2024 NBA Summer League, Collins signed with the Golden State Warriors on September 13, 2024. However, he was waived seven days later and on October 28, he rejoined Santa Cruz.

On February 19, 2025, the Golden State Warriors signed Collins to a 10-day contract. On February 23, Collins made his NBA debut against the Dallas Mavericks, scoring his first 2 career points in a 126-102 blowout victory.

=== Scarborough Shooting Stars (2025) ===
On May 17, 2025, Collins signed with the Scarborough Shooting Stars of the Canadian Elite Basketball League (CEBL).

=== Long Island Nets (2025) ===
On September 9, 2025, Collin's returning player rights were traded to the Long Island Nets from the Santa Cruz Warriors in exchange for a 2026 first-round pick and a 2026 second-round pick. On September 20, 2025, Collins signed a training camp deal with the Brooklyn Nets, but was waived the next day. He later signed with Long Island on November 3, 2025.

=== Ironi Ness Ziona (2025–2026) ===
On December 31, 2025, Collins signed with Ironi Ness Ziona of the Israeli Ligat HaAl.

=== Memphis Hustle (2026–present) ===
On September 1, 2026, Collins was traded from the Long Island Nets to the Memphis Hustle of the NBA G League in a three team trade involving the Santa Cruz Warriors.

== Career statistics ==
Legend
GP	Games played	GS	Games started	MPG	Minutes per game
FG%	Field goal percentage	3P%	3-point field goal percentage	FT%	Free throw percentage
RPG	Rebounds per game	APG	Assists per game	SPG	Steals per game
BPG	Blocks per game	PPG	Points per game	**Bold**	Career high

=== NBA ===
==== Regular season ====
Year	Team	GP	GS	MPG	FG%	3P%	FT%	RPG	APG	SPG	BPG	PPG
2024–25	Golden State	2	0	8.2	.333	—	—	1.5	2.0	1.0	.0	1.0
Career		2	0	8.2	.333	—	—	1.5	2.0	1.0	.0	1.0

== Personal life ==
Collins has polydactyly, meaning he was born with an extra finger on his right hand though he had it removed. Yuri has 5 siblings, two sisters and three brothers and is the older brother of Zyree Collins.

== See also ==
- List of NCAA Division I men's basketball players with 20 or more assists in a game
- List of NCAA Division I men's basketball season assists leaders
- List of NCAA Division I men's basketball career assists leaders
