= Caleb Houstan =

Canadian basketball player (born 2003)

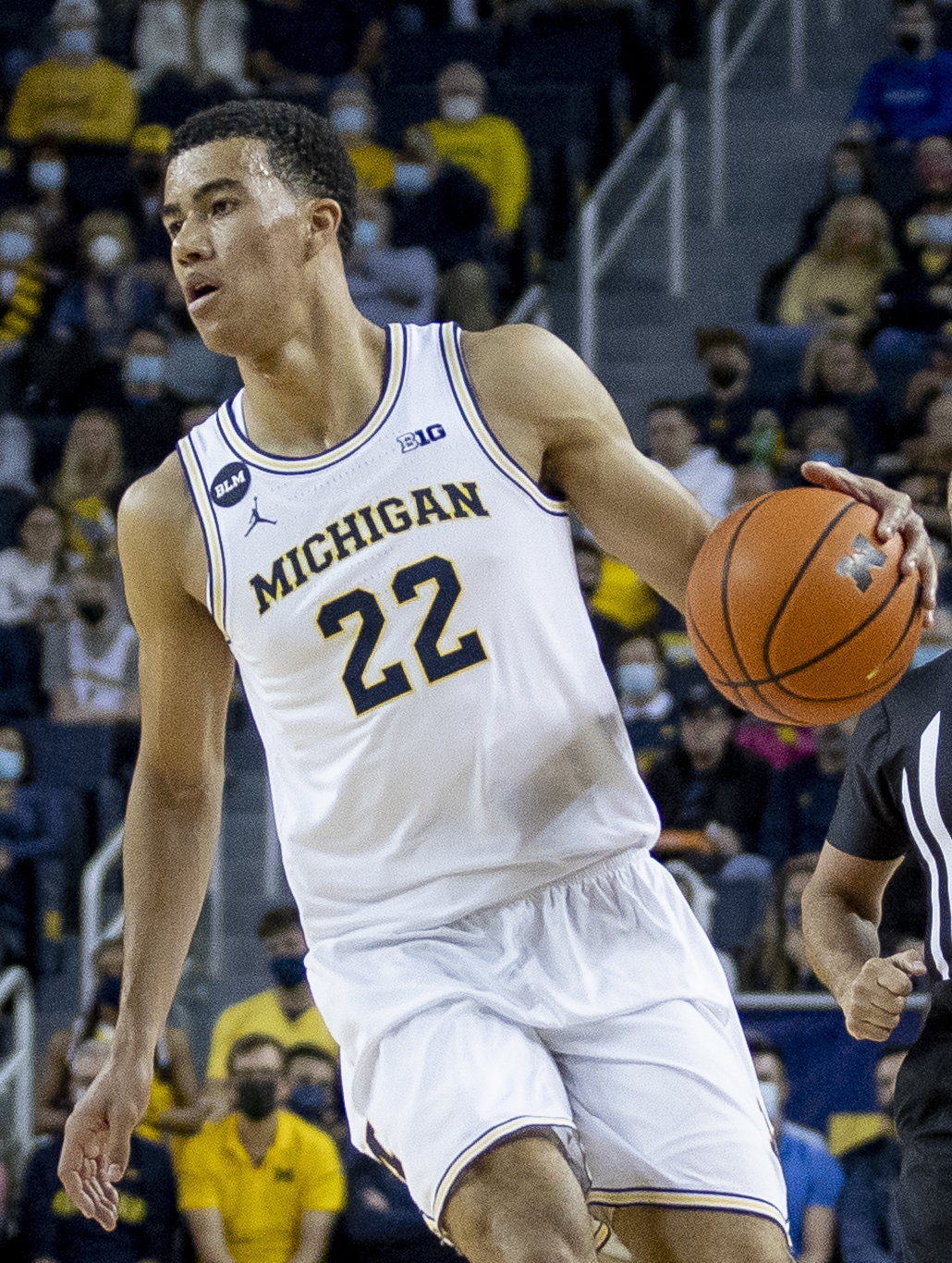
- Houstan with Michigan in 2021

No. 21 – Rip City Remix
- Position: Small forward
- League: NBA G League

Personal information
- Born: January 9, 2003 (age 23) Mississauga, Ontario, Canada
- Listed height: 6 ft 8 in (2.03 m)
- Listed weight: 205 lb (93 kg)

Career information
- High school: St. Marcellinus (Mississauga, Ontario); Montverde Academy (Montverde, Florida)
- College: Michigan (2021–2022)
- NBA draft: 2022: 2nd round, 32nd overall pick
- Drafted by: Orlando Magic
- Playing career: 2022–present

Career history
- 2022–2025: Orlando Magic
- 2023, 2024: →Lakeland/Osceola Magic
- 2025–2026: Atlanta Hawks
- 2025–2026: →College Park Skyhawks
- 2026–present: Rip City Remix

Career highlights
- McDonald's All-American (2021)
- Stats at NBA.com
- Stats at Basketball Reference
Medals
Men's basketball
Representing Canada
FIBA Under-19 World Cup
Bronze medal – third place	2021 Latvia	Team
FIBA Americas U16 Championship
Silver medal – second place	2019 Brazil	Team

Caleb Michael David Houstan (/ˈhjuːstən/ HEW-stən; born January 9, 2003) is a Canadian professional basketball player for the Rip City Remix of the NBA G League. He played college basketball for the Michigan Wolverines.

After reclassifying to graduate high school a year early, Houstan was a consensus five-star recruit with McDonald's All-American and Jordan Brand Classic recognition as one of the top players in the 2021 class. He won a silver medal with Canada at the 2019 FIBA Under-16 Americas Championship and a bronze medal at the 2021 FIBA Under-19 Basketball World Cup.

== High school career ==
At the 2017 U15 Canadian National Championships, Houstan was a member of the All-tournament first team along with Charles Bediako and MVP Johnathan Avgousti. He helped Ontario to an undefeated 5–0 record and posted 21 points and 11 rebounds in the championship game against Quebec.

For his first three years, Houstan attended Montverde Academy in Montverde, Florida. On July 17, 2020, Houstan announced he would forgo his senior year, graduate from high school early, and reclassify to class of 2021. As a freshman, he helped lead the Eagles to a 22–3 record and the semifinal of the prep national championship. As a sophomore, he averaged 10 points, 3.5 rebounds and 1.2 assists while shooting 53.1 percent on 3-pointers, helping lead the Eagles to a perfect 25–0 record, and ranked No. 1 in the country, before the season was cancelled due to the COVID-19 pandemic. Despite the season being cut short, Montverde was declared the prep national champions. He was the only non-senior to start on a roster with talented players such as Scottie Barnes, Cade Cunningham, Moses Moody, Day'Ron Sharpe, and Zeb Jackson.

As a junior, he helped lead the Eagles to a 21–1 record, and the No. 1 seed in the inaugural NIBC tournament. Montverde Academy defeated Sunrise Christian Academy 61–57 to win the NIBC championship. On February 5, 2021, Sunrise Christian Academy defeated Montverde Academy 66–69 in overtime, ending high school basketball's longest win streak at 44 games. Houstan led Montverde with 19 points and 10 rebounds.

Houstan was named to the 2021 McDonald's All-American Boys Game and Jordan Brand Classic rosters, becoming the first Michigan signee to earn the distinction since Daniel Horton in 2002. Due to the COVID-19 pandemic, the McDonald's All-American Game and Jordan Brand Classic were not played for the second consecutive year.

=== Recruiting ===
On October 30, 2020, Houstan announced his commitment to playing college basketball for Michigan over offers from Alabama, Duke and Virginia. He was the No. 2 rated player in the state of Florida, and was ranked the No. 14 overall prospect in the nation according to 247Sports, and No. 4 power forward, becoming Michigan's highest-rated recruit in the modern recruiting era. Michigan's 2021 recruiting class was ranked No. 1 in the nation by 247Sports, ESPN and Rivals.

College recruiting
Name	Hometown	School	Height	Weight	Commit date
Caleb Houstan; SF / SG	Mississauga, Ontario	Montverde Academy (FL)	6 ft 8 in (2.03 m)	205 lb (93 kg)	Oct 30, 2020
Caleb Houstan; SF / SG	Recruit ratings: Rivals: 247Sports: ESPN: (96)				
Overall recruit ranking: Rivals: 8 247Sports: 14 ESPN: 8
Note: In many cases, Scout, Rivals, 247Sports, On3, and ESPN may conflict in their listings of height and weight.; In these cases, the average was taken. ESPN grades are on a 100-point scale.; Sources: "Michigan 2021 Basketball Commitments". Rivals.; "2021 Michigan Wolverines Recruiting Class". ESPN.; "2021 Team Ranking". Rivals.

== College career ==
On February 23, 2022, Houstan scored a career-high 21 points in a 71–62 win over Rutgers. As a freshman, he averaged 10.1 points, four rebounds, and 1.4 assists per game. Following the season, Houstan declared for the 2022 NBA draft while maintaining his college eligibility. However, on June 1, 2022, he announced that he would remain in the draft and forego his remaining eligibility.

== Professional career ==
=== Orlando / Lakeland / Osceola Magic (2022–2025) ===
Houstan was drafted 32nd overall by the Orlando Magic in the 2022 NBA draft. Houstan joined the Magic in the 2022 NBA Summer League. In his Summer League debut, he scored twenty points on 7-for-12 shooting from the field, including 5-for-9 from the three-point line. On July 11, 2022, Houstan signed a rookie contract with the Magic.

Houstan appeared as the first player off the bench in the season opener against the Detroit Pistons on October 19, but went scoreless with three rebounds and a blocked shot in 21:55. He made his first career start in place of the injured Mo Bamba on November 28 in a game against the Brooklyn Nets, and recorded seven rebounds in 30:52. In the April 9 season finale against Miami, his 21 points market his first NBA 20-point game. On January 7, 2024, he posted a career-high 25 points (including 7–14 on three point shots) in an overtime victory against Atlanta. As of February 25, 2025, The Athletic ran a story that declared him to be the tallest player to have played at least 500 minutes in the NBA without ever dunking. His three-point shooting percentage improved each of his first three seasons, reaching 40% in his third season, including a 50.7% after the 2025 NBA All-Star break.

=== Atlanta Hawks / College Park Skyhawks (2025–2026) ===
On August 19, 2025, Houstan signed with the Atlanta Hawks. On October 18, the Hawks converted Houstan's contract into a two-way contract. The deal was then converted to a standard contract on February 19, 2026. Houstan appeared in 18 games for Atlanta during the 2025–26 season, averaging 2.3 points, 0.6 rebounds, and 0.2 assists. On April 4, Houstan was waived by Atlanta following the signing of Tony Bradley.

On August 3, 2026, Houstan signed a one–year contract with the New Orleans Pelicans.

== National team career ==
Houstan represented Canada at the 2019 FIBA Under-16 Americas Championship in Belém, Brazil. He started all six games, led Team Canada in scoring, and ranked second overall in the tournament, averaging 22.8 points while adding 5.3 rebounds, two assists, and 1.7 steals per game, and helped his team win the silver medal. In the semifinals against Dominican Republic, Houstan led Canada with 29 points, breaking the record for most points in a game by a Canadian at the FIBA Americas Under-16 Championship. Following his outstanding performance, Houstan was named to the All-Star Five as well as All-Tournament team.

Houstan was scheduled to represent Canada at the 2020 U17 World Cup and U18 FIBA Americas Championship, however, both events were postponed due to the COVID-19 pandemic. Houstan represented Canada at the 2021 FIBA Under-19 Basketball World Cup, where he averaged 17 points, 5.7 rebounds, 2.4 assists, and 2.3 steals per game, to help lead his team to a bronze medal.

== Career statistics ==
Legend
GP	Games played	GS	Games started	MPG	Minutes per game
FG%	Field goal percentage	3P%	3-point field goal percentage	FT%	Free throw percentage
RPG	Rebounds per game	APG	Assists per game	SPG	Steals per game
BPG	Blocks per game	PPG	Points per game	**Bold**	Career high

=== NBA ===
==== Regular season ====
Year	Team	GP	GS	MPG	FG%	3P%	FT%	RPG	APG	SPG	BPG	PPG
2022–23	Orlando	51	4	**15.9**	.363	.338	.833	**1.9**	**.6**	.2	**.1**	3.8
2023–24	Orlando	**59**	**13**	13.8	.388	.373	.808	1.4	.5	.3	**.1**	**4.3**
2024–25	Orlando	58	6	13.6	.421	.400	.882	1.3	**.6**	**.4**	**.1**	4.1
2025–26	Atlanta	18	0	4.2	**.538**	**.524**	**1.000**	.6	.2	.1	**.1**	2.3
Career		186	23	13.4	.397	.378	.844	1.4	.5	.3	.1	3.9

==== Playoffs ====
Year	Team	GP	GS	MPG	FG%	3P%	FT%	RPG	APG	SPG	BPG	PPG
2024	Orlando	3	0	4.7	.500	.500	—	.7	.0	.0	.0	1.0
2025	Orlando	5	0	9.4	.143	.200	—	.8	.2	.0	.2	1.2
Career		8	0	7.6	.188	.250	—	.8	.1	.0	.1	1.1

=== College ===
Year	Team	GP	GS	MPG	FG%	3P%	FT%	RPG	APG	SPG	BPG	PPG
2021–22	Michigan	34	34	32.0	.384	.355	.783	4.0	1.4	.7	.2	10.1
