= Chris Corchiani =

American-Italian basketball player (born 1968)

Personal information
- Born: March 28, 1968 (age 58) Coral Gables, Florida, U.S.
- Listed height: 6 ft 0 in (1.83 m)
- Listed weight: 185 lb (84 kg)

Career information
- High school: Hialeah-Miami Lakes (Hialeah, Florida)
- College: NC State (1987–1991)
- NBA draft: 1991: 2nd round, 36th overall pick
- Drafted by: Orlando Magic
- Playing career: 1991–2002
- Position: Point guard
- Number: 13, 12

Career history
- 1991–1992: Raleigh Bullfrogs
- 1992: Orlando Magic
- 1992–1993: Rapid City Thrillers
- 1993: Washington Bullets
- 1993: Benetton Treviso
- 1993–1994: Boston Celtics
- 1994–1995: Efes Pilsen
- 1995–1996: Bayer Leverkusen
- 1996–1997: Valvi Girona
- 1998–1999: Ducato Siena
- 1999–2000: Pepsi Rimini
- 2000–2002: Tau Cerámica

Career highlights
- Third-team All-American – NABC (1991); NCAA assists leader (1991); 2× Second-team All-ACC (1989, 1991); Third-team All-ACC (1990); No. 13 jersey honored by NC State Wolfpack; Fourth-team Parade All-American (1987); McDonald's All-American (1987); 2× Florida Mr. Basketball (1986, 1987)
- Stats at NBA.com
- Stats at Basketball Reference
Medals
Men's basketball
Representing United States
FIBA Americas Championship
Silver medal – second place	1989 Mexico City	National team

Christopher Corchiani Sr. (born March 28, 1968) is an American-Italian former professional basketball player who played at the point guard position. He played briefly in the National Basketball Association (NBA) after a college career with the NC State Wolfpack. Corchiani was the first college player to amass 1,000 career assists and as of 2026 is one of only five players in history to achieve the milestone.

== High school ==
Born in Coral Gables, Florida, Corchiani attended Miami's Kendall Acres Academy, and Hialeah-Miami Lakes High School, in Hialeah, Florida.

== College career ==
Corchiani's college basketball career lasted from 1988 to 1991, at North Carolina State University, where he played with the NC State Wolfpack. Corchiani was the first NCAA Division I player to record 1,000 assists in a career. In the 1990–91 season, he led the nation in assists per game average, at 9.7 per game. At the time he finished his career, he was in 5th place on the NCAA's all-time steals list.

== Professional career ==
Corchiani was selected by the Orlando Magic, with the 9th pick of the 2nd round (36th overall), of the 1991 NBA draft. In addition to the Magic, he played with two other NBA teams, the Boston Celtics and the Washington Bullets. He also played professionally in Italy, Turkey, Spain, and Germany. He was a member of the Bayer Leverkusen team, which captured the German Bundesliga title in 1996 under the guidance of coach Dirk Bauermann. In 2002, he won the Spanish Cup and the Spanish national championship with Tau Cerámica, alongside players like Fabricio Oberto, Luis Scola and Andrés Nocioni, and coached by Duško Ivanović.

After retiring from basketball, he settled in Raleigh, North Carolina, working as a realtor, then as the owner of a mortgage bank. In 2007, he founded a title insurance agency.

== See also ==
- List of NCAA Division I men's basketball players with 20 or more assists in a game
- List of NCAA Division I men's basketball career assists leaders
- List of NCAA Division I men's basketball season assists leaders
