= Bill Walker (Toledo basketball) =

American basketball player

- Walker in 1951

Personal information
- Born: c. 1926 (age 99–100) Queens, New York, U.S.
- Died: 2001 Indian Harbour Beach, Florida, U.S.
- Listed height: 5 ft 10 in (1.78 m)

Career information
- College: Toledo (1948–1951)
- NBA draft: 1951: undrafted
- Position: Guard

Career highlights
- NCAA assists leader (1951)

William J. Walker Jr. (born c. 1926) was an American basketball player. He was a native of Queens, New York and played the guard position. Walker played collegiately for the Toledo Rockets from 1948 to 1951. He was known as an excellent dribbler and passer, and was the first officially recorded national season assists leader with his 7.24 per game average during the 1950–51 NCAA men's basketball season. However, Walker's collegiate accomplishments were overshadowed by his involvement in a point shaving scandal during his senior year.

During a game against the Niagara Purple Eagles on December 15, 1950, Walker's Toledo Rockets held a lead of 17 points with three minutes remaining. In the final minutes of the game, the Rockets misdribbled the ball, threw errant passes and only won the game by three points. The game began suspicion among spectators that a fix had occurred and an investigation was subsequently commenced. Walker and teammates Carlo Munzi and Robert McDonald were found to be involved with the point shaving plot after having been instructed to win the Niagara game by less than the predicted seven points following a payment from New York gambler Eli Klukofski, who had been involved in other fixes. The three Toledo players had turned down opportunities to point shave previous games against the Michigan Wolverines, Illinois Fighting Illini and Denver Pioneers as it "meant too much for them and the school" to defeat those teams. For the Niagara game, Walker received $1,750 from Klukofski and gave $250 each to Munzi and McDonald. At the same time in the scandal, another Toledo player named Jack Feeman would be arrested alongside the original three in connection to the scandal as well, albeit in relation to a different game by comparison. No charges were formally placed against Walker and his teammates as the state of Ohio had no laws dealing with sports bribery.

Prior to enrolling at Toledo, Walker had served in the United States Navy. Walker graduated from Toledo just six weeks before the accusal; he was 25 years old, was married and had fathered one son at the time. Walker showed remorse for his involvement in the scandal. In a July 29, 1951 issue of The Toledo Blade, he was quoted "In the end all this scandal will help a lot of kids and a lot of schools. My own boy will never make the same mistake I did."

== See also ==
- CCNY point shaving scandal
