= List of NCAA Division I men's basketball players with 20 or more assists in a game =

In basketball, an assist is a pass to a teammate that directly leads to a score by field goal. All of the players on this list have recorded at least 20 assists in a National Collegiate Athletic Association (NCAA) Division I game. Assists were first recognized in the 1950–51 season, but only lasted through 1951–52 before the NCAA stopped recording them until the 1983–84 season. All players on this list have accumulated at least 20 assists in a game while playing for a Division I university. Through December 21, 2024, this has occurred only 25 times.

The single game record is 24 assists, set by Cameron Parker of Sacred Heart on December 1, 2019. The previous record of 22 had been accomplished by four players. Four 21-assist performances have been recorded, while the remaining instances have been 20 assists.

No school has had more than one player reach the 20-assist mark. Southern University is on this list four times via Avery Johnson's four 20-assist games during his career. Johnson, who spent his first two college seasons at New Mexico Junior College and then Cameron University, only played NCAA Division I basketball for two seasons (1987, 1988). He led Division I in assists per game both years and set the still-standing record of 13.30 assists per game in 1987–88. Cameron Parker joins him as the only two players in Division I history to reach 20 assists more than once.

== Key ==
Pos.	G	F	C	Ref.
Position	Guard	Forward	Center	Reference(s)

Class (Cl.) key
Fr	Freshman	So	Sophomore	Jr	Junior	Sr	Senior

*	Elected to the Naismith Memorial Basketball Hall of Fame
Player (X)	Denotes the number of times the player appears on the list

== Dates of 20+ assists ==
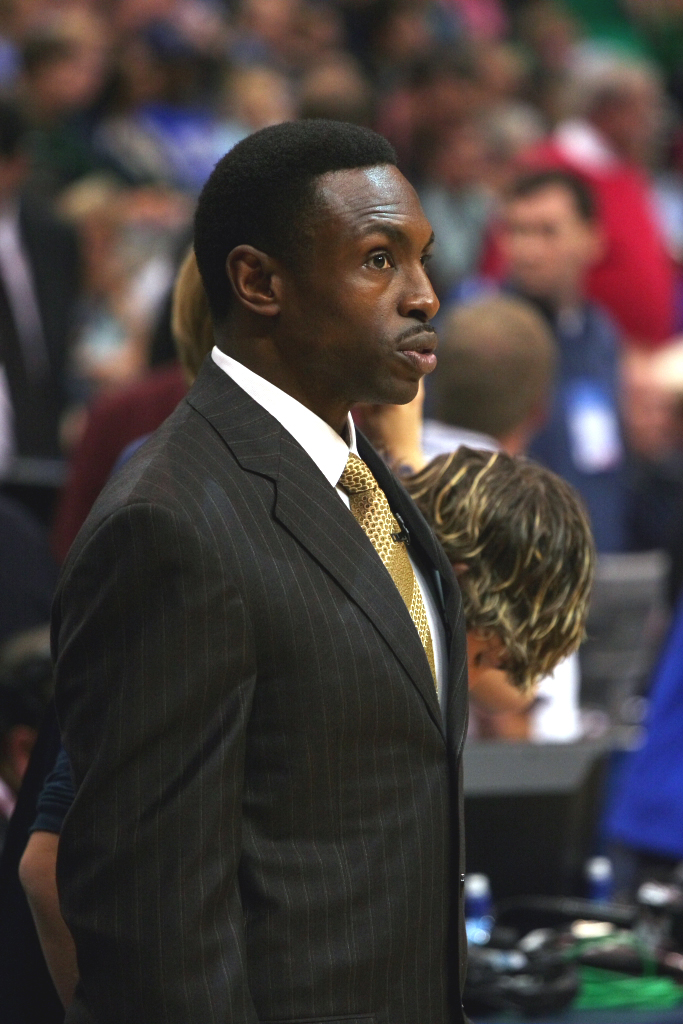
Avery Johnson of Southern University is one of only two players on this list with multiple 20+ assist games, and he has four of them.

Assists	Player	Pos.	Cl.	Team	Opponent	Date	Ref.
24	Cameron Parker	G	So	Sacred Heart	Pine Manor	December 1, 2019	
22	Sherman Douglas	G	Sr	Syracuse	Providence	January 28, 1989	
22	Tony Fairley	G	Sr	Charleston Southern	Armstrong Atlantic	February 9, 1987	
22	Avery Johnson	G	Sr	Southern	Texas Southern	January 25, 1988	
22	Trae Young	G	Fr	Oklahoma	Northwestern State	December 19, 2017	
21	Avery Johnson (2)	G	Sr	Southern	Alabama State	January 16, 1988	
21	Anthony Manuel	G	Jr	Bradley	UC Irvine	December 19, 1987	
21	Kelvin Scarborough	G	Sr	New Mexico	Hawaiʻi	February 13, 1987	
21	Mark Wade	G	Sr	UNLV	Navy	December 29, 1986	
20	Brandon Brooks	G	Jr	Alabama State	Jackson State	March 8, 2008	
20	Mateen Cleaves	G	Sr	Michigan State	Michigan	March 4, 2000	
20	Yuri Collins	G	Jr	Saint Louis	Tennessee State	November 30, 2022	
20	Chris Corchiani	G	Sr	NC State	Maryland	February 27, 1991	
20	Sam Crawford	G	Jr	New Mexico State	Sam Houston State	December 21, 1992	
20	Howard Evans	G	Sr	Temple	Villanova	February 10, 1988	
20	Dana Harris	G	Sr	UMBC	St. Mary's (MD)	December 12, 1992	
20	Drew Henderson	G	Jr	Fairfield	Loyola (MD)	January 25, 1992	
20	Avery Johnson (3)	G	Jr	Southern	Texas Southern	March 6, 1987	
20	Avery Johnson (4)	G	Sr	Southern	Mississippi Valley State	February 8, 1988	
20	James Johnson	G	Sr	Middle Tennessee	Freed–Hardeman	January 2, 1986	
20	Grayson Marshall	G	So	Clemson	Maryland Eastern Shore	November 25, 1985	
20	Sean Newman Jr.	G	Jr	Louisiana Tech	Rust	December 21, 2024	
20	Cameron Parker (2)	G	Sr	Montana	SAGU AIC	December 13, 2021	
20	Jasper Walker	G	So	Saint Peter's	Holy Cross	February 11, 1989	
20	Ray Washington	G	Sr	Nicholls	McNeese	January 28, 1995	

== See also ==
- List of NBA single-game assists leaders
