= Tom O'Toole (Boston College basketball) =

American basketball player

Career information
- College: Boston College (1949–1952)
- NBA draft: 1952: undrafted
- Position: Guard

Career highlights
- NCAA assists leader (1952)

Thomas O'Toole was an American basketball player best known for his collegiate career at Boston College. A left-handed guard, O'Toole scored 703 points in his three-year varsity career between 1949–50 and 1951–52. Despite averaging 10.3 points per game for his career, which in the early 1950s was an impressive number, he was known more for his tenacious play and ability to distribute the basketball to his teammates. He is the NCAA's second ever officially recognized season assists leader, and his 7.89 assists per game as a senior topped the nation. O'Toole would also become the last assists champion recognized for 31 years until the NCAA began keeping track again in 1983–84.

In his final game as a Boston College Eagle, O'Toole scored 23 points as his team upset highly favored Holy Cross, 64–61. The win capped a 22–5 season, one of the school's best ever, as he exited the court to a standing ovation.

After college, O'Toole forwent any professional basketball aspirations and decided to coach instead, including high school. In 1977 he was inducted into the Boston College Varsity Club Athletic Hall of Fame.
