= List of NCAA Division I men's basketball season assists leaders =

In basketball, an assist is a pass to a teammate that directly leads to a score by field goal. The National Collegiate Athletic Association's (NCAA) Division I assist title is awarded to the player with the highest assists per game average in a given season. The assist title was first recognized in the 1950–51 season when statistics on assists were first compiled by the NCAA, but there are no officially recorded assist leaders between 1952–53 and 1982–83. The NCAA did not split into its current divisions format until August 1973. From 1906 to 1955, there were no classifications to the NCAA nor its predecessor, the Intercollegiate Athletic Association of the United States (IAAUS). Then, from 1956 to 1973, colleges were classified as either "NCAA University Division (Major College)" or "NCAA College Division (Small College)".

Avery Johnson of Southern University holds the all-time NCAA Division I record for single season assists per game (apg) average (13.30), which he accomplished in 1987–88. He also recorded 399 assists that season, which is the second highest single season mark behind UNLV's Mark Wade's record of 406, which occurred in 1986–87. From 1952–53 to 1982–83, the official NCAA record book has no assists per game leaders. Oklahoma freshman Trae Young was the first player to lead the NCAA in both assists and points in the 2017–18 season, while Murray State sophomore Ja Morant was the first player in NCAA history to average at least 20 points and 10 assists throughout the same season in the 2018–19 season.

Four players have earned multiple assist titles: Avery Johnson of Southern (1987, 1988), Jared Jordan of Marist (2006, 2007), Jason Brickman of LIU Brooklyn (2013, 2014), and Yuri Collins of Saint Louis. There has been one tie for the national assists leader, which happened during the 2004–05 season when Damitrius Coleman of Mercer and Will Funn of Portland State recorded identical season statistics: 28 games played, 224 total assists and an 8.00 apg average.

Only three freshmen (T. J. Ford, Lonzo Ball, and Trae Young) and two sophomores (Jason Kidd and Ja Morant) have led Division I in average assists. Three players born outside the United States have led Division I in assists — 1995–96 leader Raimonds Miglinieks of UC Irvine, born in modern-day Latvia (the Latvian SSR of the Soviet Union at the time of his birth); 1999–2000 leader Mark Dickel of UNLV, born in New Zealand; and 2024–25 leader Ryan Nembhard, born in Canada.

== Key ==
Pos.	G	F	C	APG	Ref.
Position	Guard	Forward	Center	Assists per game	References

Class (Cl.) key
Fr	Freshman	So	Sophomore	Jr	Junior	Sr	Senior

^	Player still active in NCAA Division I
*	Elected to the Naismith Memorial Basketball Hall of Fame
†	Denotes a tie for the season's assists leader
Player (X)	Denotes the number of times the player had been the assists leader up to and including that season

== Assists leaders ==
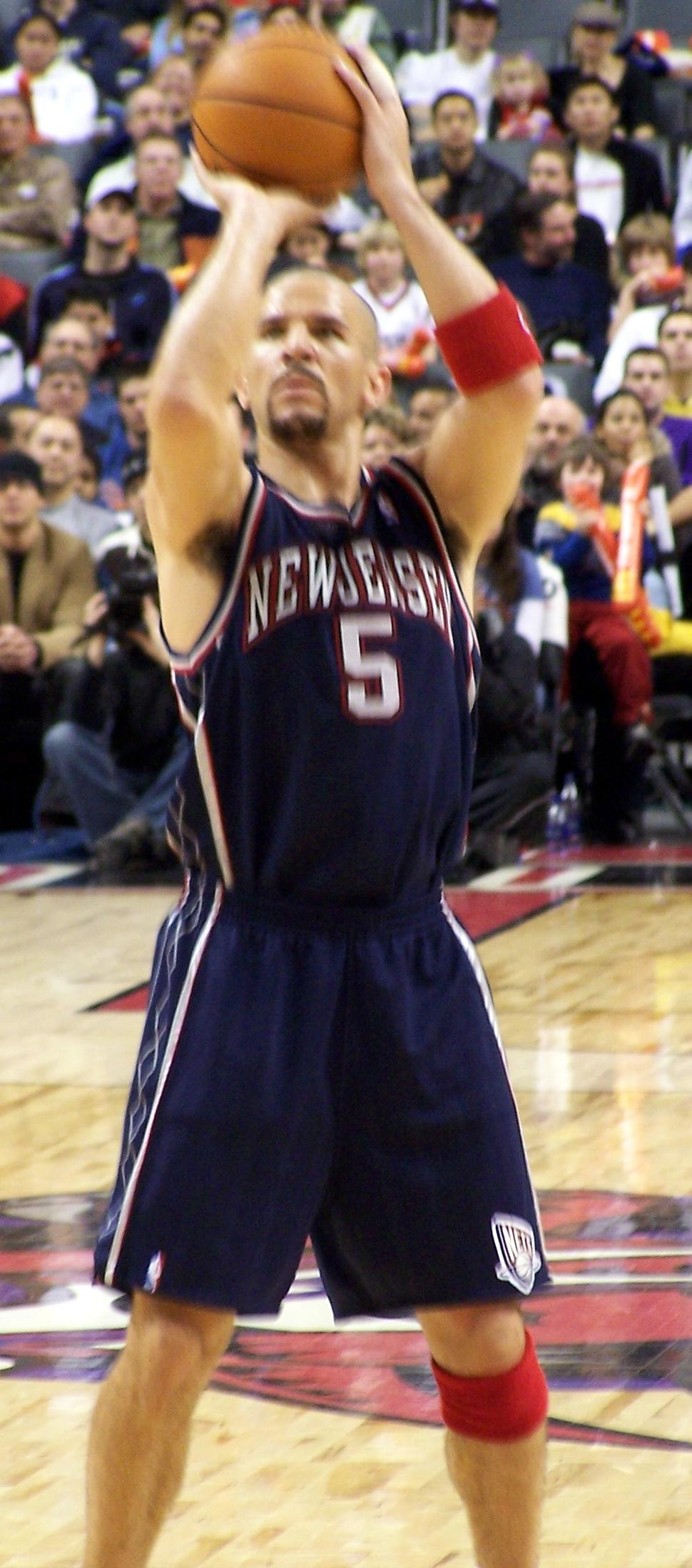
Jason Kidd won the assists title in 1993–94.

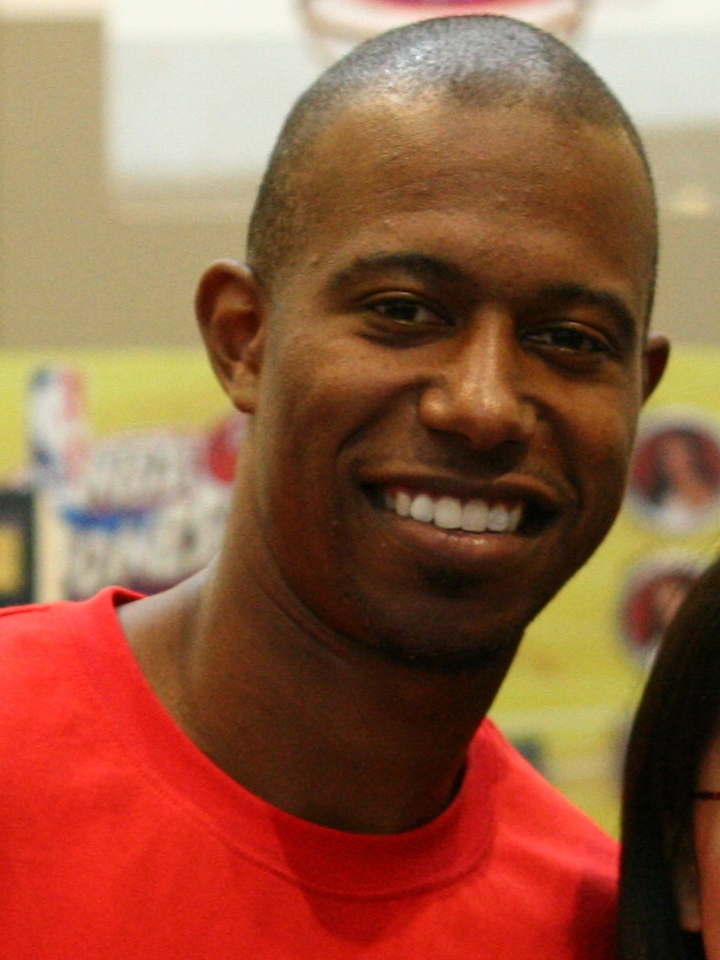
T. J. Ford was the first freshman to lead NCAA Division I in assists.

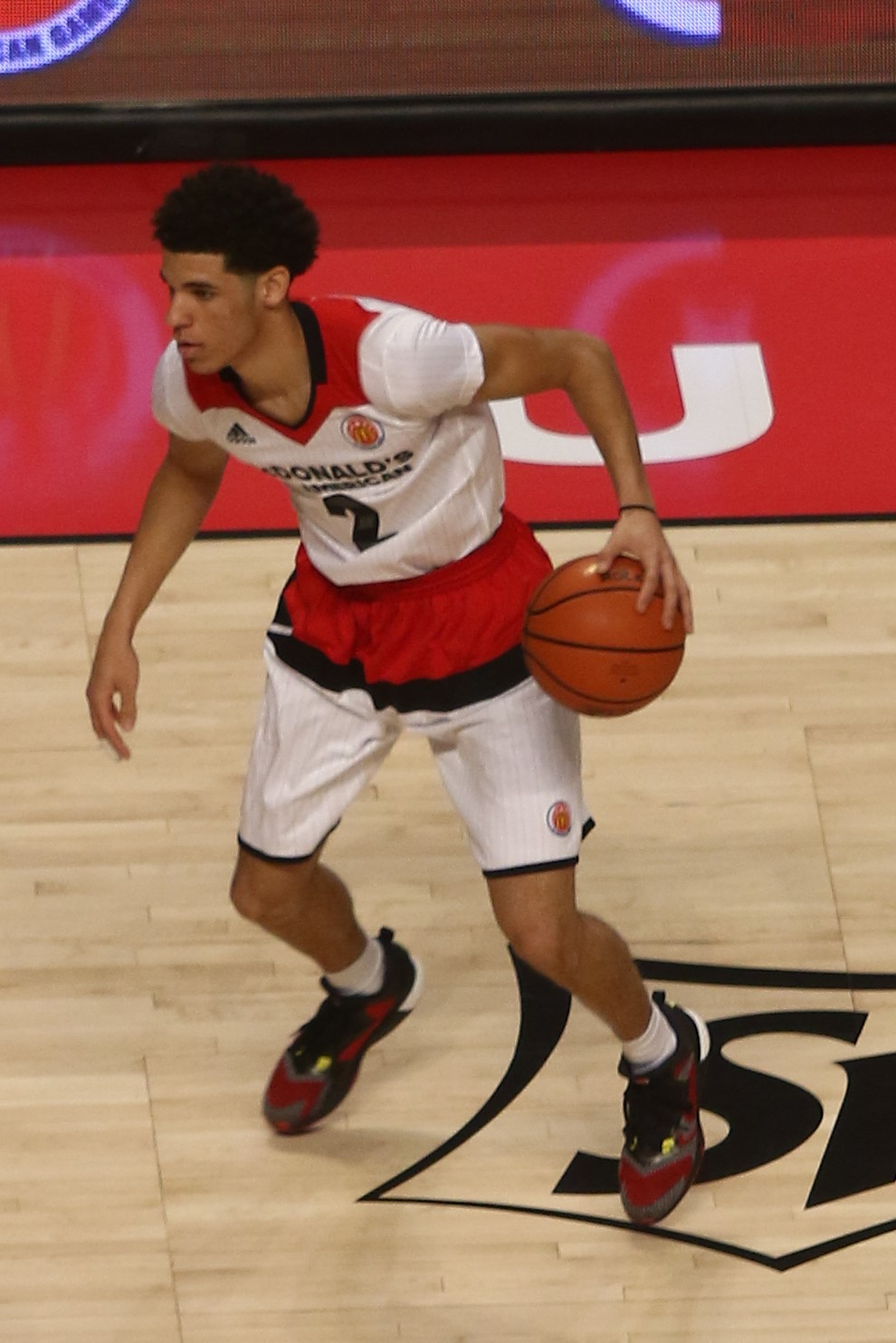
Lonzo Ball became the second freshman to do so, in 2016–17.

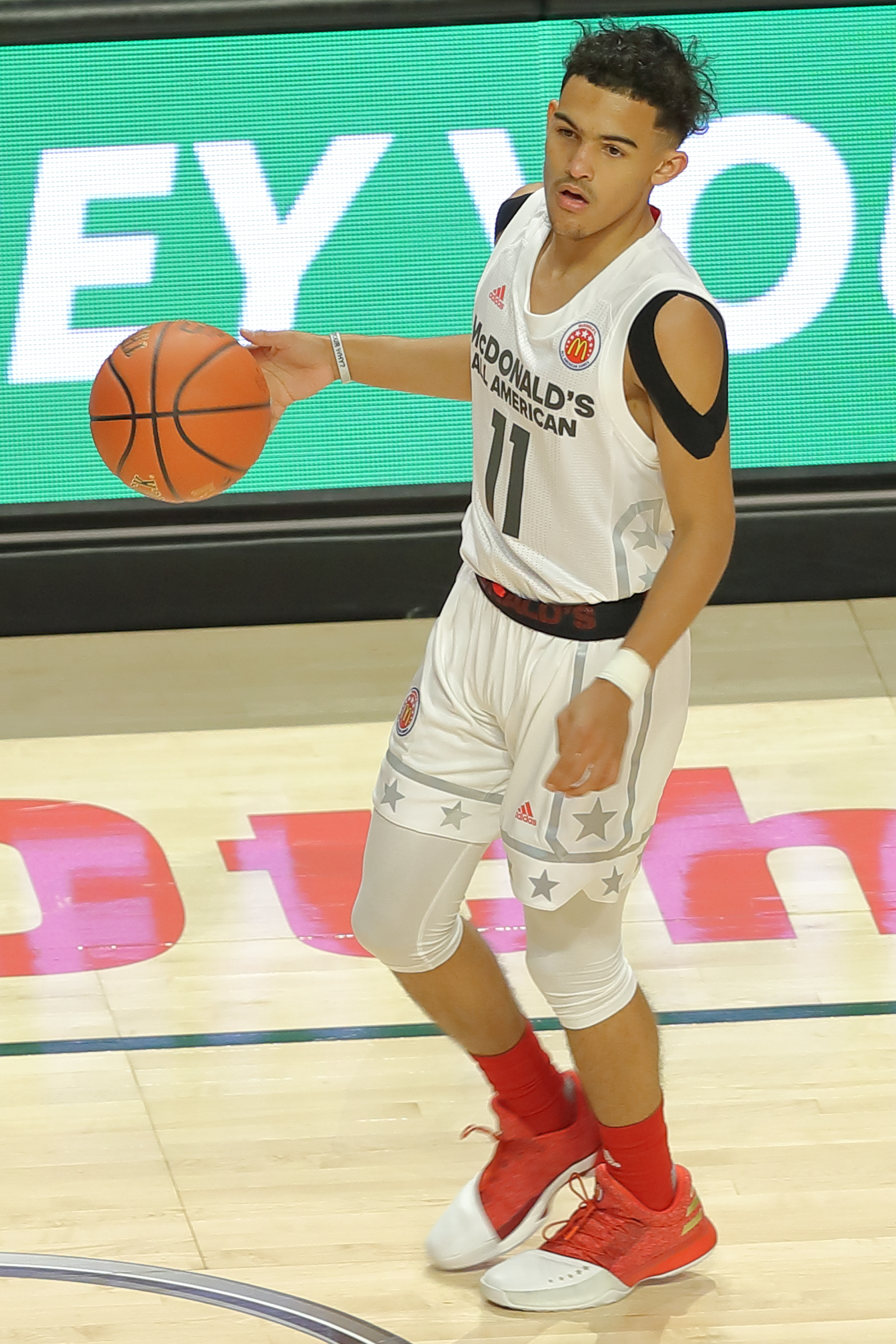
Trae Young was the third freshman to lead in assists and the first player to lead in both points and assists in 2017–18.

Except as specifically noted, all teams are listed with their current athletic brand names, which do not always reflect those used by a given program in a specific season.

Season	Player	Pos.	Cl.	Team	Games played	Assists	APG	Ref.
1950–51	Bill Walker	G	Sr	Toledo	29	210	7.24	
1951–52	Tom O'Toole	G	Sr	Boston College	27	213	7.89	
1953–83	No assists leaders recorded							
1983–84	Craig Lathen	G	Jr	UIC	29	274	9.45	
1984–85	Robbie Weingard	G	Sr	Hofstra	24	228	9.50	
1985–86	Mark Jackson	G	Jr	St. John's	36	328	9.11	
1986–87	Avery Johnson	G	Jr	Southern	31	333	10.74	
1987–88	Avery Johnson (2)	G	Sr	Southern	30	399	13.30	
1988–89	Glenn Williams	G	Sr	Holy Cross	28	278	9.93	
1989–90	Todd Lehmann	G	Sr	Drexel	28	260	9.29	
1990–91	Chris Corchiani	G	Sr	NC State	31	299	9.65	
1991–92	Van Usher	G	Sr	Tennessee Tech	29	254	8.76	
1992–93	Sam Crawford	G	Sr	New Mexico State	34	310	9.12	
1993–94	Jason Kidd*	G	So	California	30	272	9.07	
1994–95	Nelson Haggerty	G	Sr	Baylor	28	284	10.14	
1995–96	Raimonds Miglinieks	G	Sr	UC Irvine	27	230	8.52	
1996–97	Kenneth Mitchell	G	Sr	Dartmouth	26	203	7.81	
1997–98	Ahlon Lewis	G	Sr	Arizona State	32	294	9.19	
1998–99	Doug Gottlieb	G	Jr	Oklahoma State	34	299	8.79	
1999–00	Mark Dickel	G	Sr	UNLV	31	280	9.03	
2000–01	Markus Carr	G	Jr	Cal State Northridge	32	286	8.94	
2001–02	T. J. Ford	G	Fr	Texas	33	273	8.27	
2002–03	Martell Bailey	G	Jr	UIC	30	244	8.13	
2003–04	Greg Davis	G	Sr	Troy	31	256	8.26	
2004–05^{†}	Damitrius Coleman	G	Jr	Mercer	28	224	8.00	
2004–05^{†}	Will Funn	G	Sr	Portland State	28	224	8.00	
2005–06	Jared Jordan	G	Jr	Marist	29	247	8.52	
2006–07	Jared Jordan (2)	G	Sr	Marist	33	286	8.67	
2007–08	Jason Richards	G	Sr	Davidson	36	293	8.14	
2008–09	Johnathon Jones	G	Jr	Oakland	36	290	8.06	
2009–10	Ronald Moore	G	Sr	Siena	34	261	7.68	
2010–11	Aaron Johnson	G	Sr	UAB	31	239	7.71	
2011–12	Scott Machado	G	Sr	Iona	33	327	9.91	
2012–13	Jason Brickman	G	Jr	LIU Brooklyn (Note: At the time, Long Island University operated two separate athletic programs—the Division I LIU Brooklyn Blackbirds, representing the school's Brooklyn campus, and the Division II LIU Post Pioneers, representing the Post campus in Nassau County, New York. After the 2018–19 school year, the university merged its athletic programs, creating the current LIU Sharks. The Sharks inherited LIU Brooklyn's Division I and Northeast Conference memberships, as well as the history and records of all sports that the Brooklyn campus sponsored at the time of the merger.)	34	289	8.50	
2013–14	Jason Brickman (2)	G	Sr	LIU Brooklyn	29	289	9.97	
2014–15	Jalan West	G	Jr	Northwestern State	32	246	7.69	
2015–16	Kay Felder	G	Jr	Oakland	35	324	9.26	
2016–17	Lonzo Ball	G	Fr	UCLA	36	274	7.61	
2017–18	Trae Young	G	Fr	Oklahoma	32	279	8.71	
2018–19	Ja Morant	G	So	Murray State	33	331	10.03	
2019–20	Kameron Langley	G	Jr	North Carolina A&T	31	247	7.96	
2020–21	Jalen Moore	G	Jr	Oakland	30	252	8.40	
2021–22	Yuri Collins	G	Jr	Saint Louis	34	267	7.85	
2022–23	Yuri Collins (2)	G	Sr	Saint Louis	32	324	10.12	
2023–24	Tyler Kolek	G	Sr	Marquette	31	239	7.71	
2024–25	Ryan Nembhard	G	Sr	Gonzaga	35	344	9.82	
2025–26	Jeremy Fears Jr.^	G	Jr	Michigan State	35	328	9.37	

== Multiple-time leaders ==
Rank	Player	Team	Times leader	Years
1	Jason Brickman	LIU Brooklyn	2	2012–13, 2013–14
1	Yuri Collins	Saint Louis	2	2021–22, 2022–23
1	Avery Johnson	Southern	2	1986–87, 1987–88
1	Jared Jordan	Marist	2	2005–06, 2006–07
