= Gael Bonilla =

Mexican basketball player (born 2003)

No. 2 – Balkan Botevgrad
- Position: Shooting guard / small forward
- League: NBL; EuroCup

Personal information
- Born: 26 February 2003 (age 23) Ecatepec, State of Mexico, Mexico
- Listed height: 6 ft 8 in (2.03 m)
- Listed weight: 205 lb (93 kg)

Career information
- High school: Colegio San Carlos
- NBA draft: 2023: undrafted
- Playing career: 2022–present

Career history
- 2020–2023: FC Barcelona B
- 2023: Mexico City Capitanes
- 2023–2024: Cáceres Ciudad del Baloncesto
- 2024–2025: Diablos Rojos del México
- 2025: Ángeles de la Ciudad de México
- 2026–present: Balkan Botevgrad

Career highlights
- LNBP Rookie of the Year (2024)
- Stats at Basketball Reference

Yahir Gael Bonilla Silva (born 26 February 2003) is a Mexican professional basketball player for Balkan Botevgrad of the Bulgarian National Basketball League (NBL) and the EuroCup. He also represents the Mexican national team. He is considered one of the most promising young talents of Mexican basketball.

== Early years ==
Bonilla is the youngest of two siblings born to Edgar Bonilla and Paola Silva, and grew up in the Jardines de Morelos neighborhood. His father played a key role in his decision to pursue basketball. From a very young age, Bonilla stood out on the court thanks to his father and his brother, Rasheed, with whom he would play 21-point games for hours.

Bonilla played basketball at Colegio San Carlos, which later retired his No. 7 jersey. His arrival in Spain was the result of three consecutive years of participation in Giovanni Rivera's camp. In 2012, at nine years old, Bonilla caught the attention of Canarias Basketball Academy. He then drew the attention of the two most popular and powerful teams, Real Madrid and Barcelona, signing with the latter ahead of the next season of the Spanish championship in the Cadete category (under-16).

== Professional career ==
In the 2020/21 season, Bonilla was part of the FC Barcelona B team, playing 14 matches in the Segunda FEB and the Adidas Next Generation circuit. He participated in seven games in this circuit, starting three, and averaged 10.3 points on 55 percent shooting, 77.8 percent from the free-throw line, and 28 percent from three-point range. Bonilla finished the Adidas NGT season as the second-leading scorer and assist leader for Barcelona, and was third in rebounds. In the 2021/22 season, he remained in the FC Barcelona B team, playing in the Liga EBA. In 24 games, he averaged 12.5 points, 5.3 rebounds, 2.7 assists, and 2 steals per game. He was called up to the first team for two Euroleague games, making his debut on March 25 against Fenerbahçe. In the 2022/23 season, he stayed with the Barcelona B team, starting the season and playing six games, averaging 14.3 points, 7.5 rebounds, 2.2 steals, 3.5 assists, and 1 block, being one of the standout players in the competition before leaving in early January.

On January 7, 2023, Bonilla signed with the Mexico City Capitanes for the 2022-2023 NBA G League season. He became the third active Mexican player in the franchise, joining Moisés Andriassi and Orlando Méndez-Valdez. Bonilla played 20 games, averaging 2.5 points and 2.6 rebounds in almost 11 minutes per game, before returning to FC Barcelona in March.

In April 2023, he announced his intention to declare for the 2023 NBA Draft, but withdrew his name a few days before the event.

After parting ways with FC Barcelona, on June 28, 2023, he signed with Cáceres Ciudad del Baloncesto, a team in the Spanish second-tier Liga LEB Oro. During the 2023/24 season, he played 33 games, averaging 7.6 points, 4.8 rebounds, and 1.9 assists.

On May 21, 2024, he was announced as the first signing in the history of the Diablos Rojos del México in the Liga Nacional de Baloncesto Profesional (LNBP).

On February 4, 2025, he signed with the Ángeles de la Ciudad de México of the CIBACOPA.

On August 22, 2026, Bonilla signed with Balkan Botevgrad of the Bulgarian National Basketball League (NBL).

== National team career ==
Bonilla attended the pre-selection training camp for the U-15 national team ahead of the Centrobasket. However, he was unable to attend the next pre-selection camp due to a commitment with FC Barcelona. Bonilla led Mexico to a gold medal at the 2019 FIBA U17 Centrobasket, recording 18 points and 13 rebounds in the final.

Bonilla earned a silver medal at the 2023 Central American and Caribbean Games. He later played in the 2023 FIBA World Cup held in Asia, where they finished in 25th place.
