= List of NBA single-game assists leaders =

This is a complete listing of National Basketball Association players who have recorded 22 or more assists in a game.

39 players have recorded 22 or more assists in a game. It has occurred 71 times in the regular season and six times in the playoffs.

John Stockton has performed the feat the most times (13), followed by Kevin Porter (9) and Magic Johnson (8).

== Key ==
^		Active NBA player			
*		Inducted into the Naismith Memorial Basketball Hall of Fame			
Bold score		Occurred in playoff competition			
Italicized score		Player's team lost the game			
Min	Minutes played	Pts	Points	Reb	Rebounds
Stl	Steals	Blk	Blocks	Tov	Turnovers

== Single-game leaders ==
Assists	Player	Team	Score	Opponent	Date	Min	Pts	Reb	Stl	Blk	Tov	Notes
30	Scott Skiles	Orlando Magic	155–116	Denver Nuggets	December 30, 1990	44	22	6	2	0	4	(Note: Scott Skiles had 14 assists in the first half, 10 assists in the third quarter, and 6 assists in the fourth quarter. Skiles passed for more than twice as many assists as the opposing team, 30–14.)
29	Kevin Porter	New Jersey Nets	126–112	Houston Rockets	February 24, 1978	48	14	5	2	0	0	(Note: Kevin Porter passed for more assists than the opposing team, 29–18.)
28	Bob Cousy*	Boston Celtics	173–139	Minneapolis Lakers	February 27, 1959	45	31	5	—	—	—	(Note: Bob Cousy passed for 19 assists in a half, setting the NBA record, and 12 assists in a quarter, the NBA record at the time. Cousy passed for more assists than the opposing team, 28–15.)
28	Guy Rodgers*	San Francisco Warriors	109–114	St. Louis Hawks	March 14, 1963	48	14	5	—	—	—	(Note: Guy Rodgers had 16 assists in one half. For the game, he had more assists than the opposing team, 28–24.)
28	John Stockton*	Utah Jazz	124–102	San Antonio Spurs	January 15, 1991	39	20	3	8	0	5	(Note: John Stockton had 15 assists in the second half. For the game, he had more assists than the opposing team, 28–27.)
27	Geoff Huston	Cleveland Cavaliers	110–106	Golden State Warriors	January 27, 1982	46	24	1	0	0	4	
27	John Stockton* (2)	Utah Jazz	107–115	New York Knicks	December 19, 1989	36	18	3	2	0	2	(Note: Stockton passed for more assists than the opposing team, 27–25.)
26	John Stockton* (3)	Utah Jazz	123–128	Portland Trail Blazers	April 14, 1988	45	17	3	2	0	2	
25	Ernie DiGregorio	Buffalo Braves	120–119	Portland Trail Blazers	January 1, 1974	48	20	9	2	0	—	(Note: Ernie DiGregorio established the rookie single-game record.)
25	Kevin Porter (2)	Detroit Pistons	160–119	Boston Celtics	March 9, 1979	37	30	3	0	0	4	
25	Kevin Porter (3)	Detroit Pistons	105–116	Phoenix Suns	April 1, 1979	46	13	3	2	0	4	
25	Isiah Thomas*	Detroit Pistons	124–119	Dallas Mavericks	February 13, 1985	41	23	5	2	0	5	(Note: Isiah Thomas passed for 16 assists in the first half.)
25	Nate McMillan	Seattle SuperSonics	124–112	Los Angeles Clippers	February 23, 1987	41	8	8	1	4	3	(Note: Nate McMillan tied Ernie DiGregorio's rookie single-game record. McMillan had 17 assists in the second half. For the game, he passed for more assists than the opposing team, 25–24.)
25	Kevin Johnson	Phoenix Suns	107–95	San Antonio Spurs	April 6, 1994	41	16	3	0	0	4	
25	Jason Kidd*	Dallas Mavericks	136–133	Utah Jazz	February 8, 1996	49	20	4	4	0	5	(Note: The game went to double overtime. Kidd had more assists than the opposing team, 25–23.)
25	Rajon Rondo	New Orleans Pelicans	128–113	Brooklyn Nets	December 27, 2017	30:18	2	7	1	0	3	
24	Guy Rodgers* (2)	Chicago Bulls	110–107	New York Knicks	December 21, 1966		18	0	—	—	—	
24	Kevin Porter (4)	Washington Bullets	119–114	Detroit Pistons	March 23, 1980	44	12	1	0	0	0	
24	John Lucas	San Antonio Spurs	157–154	Denver Nuggets	April 15, 1984	28	0	0	2	0	2	(Note: John Lucas did not start in the game. He also did not score in the game. He passed for 14 assists in the second quarter, setting the NBA record. The Spurs had 50 assists as a team. This was also the last game of the regular season.)
24	Magic Johnson*	Los Angeles Lakers	118–102	Phoenix Suns	May 15, 1984	38	6	7	5	2	4	(Note: Magic Johnson had 13 assists in the second half, setting a playoff record at the time.)
24	Isiah Thomas* (2)	Detroit Pistons	126–128	Washington Bullets	February 7, 1985	50	25	10	2	1	2	(Note: Isiah Thomas registered a triple-double. The game went to double overtime.)
24	John Stockton* (4)	Utah Jazz	109–111	Los Angeles Lakers	May 17, 1988	48	23	3	5	0	3	(Note: John Stockton had 14 assists in the first half.)
24	John Stockton* (5)	Utah Jazz	102–104	Houston Rockets	January 3, 1989	45	26	1	6	0	1	(Note: Stockton passed for more assists than the opposing team, 24–22.)
24	Magic Johnson* (2)	Los Angeles Lakers	119–105	Denver Nuggets	November 17, 1989	40	24	8	6	1	3	(Note: Magic Johnson passed for more assists than the opposing team, 24–15.)
24	Magic Johnson* (3)	Los Angeles Lakers	118–121	Phoenix Suns	January 9, 1990	45	24	6	2	2	4	(Note: Magic Johnson had 16 assists in the first half. The game went to overtime.)
24	Ramon Sessions	Milwaukee Bucks	135–151	Chicago Bulls	April 14, 2008	44:27	20	8	1	1	2	(Note: Ramon Sessions was a rookie. His 24 assists were one shy of the rookie record.)
24	Rajon Rondo (2)	Boston Celtics	105–101	New York Knicks	October 29, 2010	45:20	10	10	1	0	7	(Note: Rajon Rondo registered a triple-double and tied the opposing team in assists total.)
24	Russell Westbrook	Oklahoma City Thunder	147–154	San Antonio Spurs	January 10, 2019	49:35	24	13	2	0	3	(Note: Russell Westbrook registered a triple-double. The game went to double overtime.)
24	Russell Westbrook (2)	Washington Wizards	154–141	Indiana Pacers	May 3, 2021	38:38	14	21	1	1	6	(Note: Russell Westbrook registered a triple-double.)
23	Jerry West*	Los Angeles Lakers	143–133	Philadelphia 76ers	February 1, 1967		24	6	—	—	—	(Note: Jerry West's teammate Elgin Baylor scored 44 points in the same game.)
23	Kevin Porter (5)	Detroit Pistons	131–119	Houston Rockets	December 27, 1978	41	20	3	1	0	0	
23	Kevin Porter (6)	Detroit Pistons	113–124	Los Angeles Lakers	March 30, 1979	43	15	3	1	0	3	
23	Nate Archibald*	Boston Celtics	145–144	Denver Nuggets	February 5, 1982	38	15	4	0	0	1	(Note: The Celtics scored 50 points in the first quarter and 85 points in the first half.)
23	Magic Johnson* (4)	Los Angeles Lakers	128–112	Seattle SuperSonics	February 21, 1984	36	9	5	2	0	3	(Note: Magic Johnson had 12 assists in the first quarter, tying the NBA record at the time. He also had 18 assists in the first half.)
23	Magic Johnson* (5)	Los Angeles Lakers	130–126	Portland Trail Blazers	May 3, 1985	41	13	7	1	0	6	(Note: Magic Johnson had 15 assists in the first half, setting the playoff record.)
23	Magic Johnson* (6)	Los Angeles Lakers	114–107	Dallas Mavericks	April 20, 1988	42	8	10	0	1	8	(Note: Magic Johnson tied the opposing team in assists, 23–23.)
23	Fat Lever	Denver Nuggets	139–121	Golden State Warriors	April 21, 1989	42	15	13	5	0	1	(Note: Fat Lever registered a triple-double.)
23	John Stockton* (6)	Utah Jazz	107–104	Los Angeles Lakers	April 12, 1990	44	15	4	3	0	3	(Note: The game marked the second time that Karl Malone scored 40 or more points and Stockton had 20 or more assists in the same game. Stockton had more assists than the opposing team, 23–20.)
23	John Stockton* (7)	Utah Jazz	105–95	Los Angeles Clippers	December 8, 1990	41	27	3	4	0	1	(Note: Stockton had more assists than the opposing team, 23–22.)
23	John Stockton* (8)	Utah Jazz	135–108	Golden State Warriors	November 29, 1991	36	21	2	2	1	4	
23	John Stockton* (9)	Utah Jazz	120–106	Minnesota Timberwolves	April 17, 1992	36	9	2	5	0	4	
23	Mookie Blaylock	Atlanta Hawks	139–118	Utah Jazz	March 6, 1993	37	11	0	4	0	2	
23	John Stockton* (10)	Utah Jazz	110–102	Portland Trail Blazers	April 25, 1996	41	11	2	0	0	1	(Note: Stockton had 14 assists in the second half. For the game, he had more assists than the opposing team, 23–20.)
23	Nick Van Exel	Los Angeles Lakers	95–82	Vancouver Grizzlies	January 5, 1997	43:32	8	8	1	0	2	(Note: Nick Van Exel had more assists than the opposing team, 23–21.)
23	Jamaal Tinsley	Indiana Pacers	110–103	Washington Wizards	November 22, 2001	45:02	19	11	1	1	5	(Note: Jamaal Tinsley had a triple-double. He was also a rookie.)
23	Steve Nash*	Phoenix Suns	113–100	Los Angeles Lakers	April 29, 2007	39:05	17	1	2	1	3	(Note: Steve Nash passed for 15 assists in the first half, tying the playoff record. For the game, he had more assists than the opposing team, 23–21.)
23	Rajon Rondo (3)	Boston Celtics	105–103	San Antonio Spurs	January 5, 2011	43:30	12	10	6	1	5	(Note: Rajon Rondo had a triple-double. Rondo had 21 assists after three quarters. For the game, he had more assists than the opposing team, 23–20.)
23	Ryan Nembhard^	Dallas Mavericks	149–128	Chicago Bulls	April 12, 2026	38:17	15	9	2	0	4	
23	Tyrese Haliburton^	Indiana Pacers	140–126	New York Knicks	December 30, 2023	35:43	22	5	2	1	2	
22	Oscar Robertson*	Cincinnati Royals	139–132	Syracuse Nationals	October 29, 1961		26	11	—	—	—	(Note: Oscar Robertson had a triple-double.)
22	Oscar Robertson* (2)	Cincinnati Royals	149–145	New York Knicks	March 5, 1966	53	44	8	—	—	—	(Note: The game went to overtime.)
22	Art Williams	San Diego Rockets	136–126	Phoenix Suns	December 28, 1968	42	8	9	—	—	—	
22	Art Williams (2)	San Diego Rockets	141–123	San Francisco Warriors	February 14, 1970	27	8	6	—	—	—	
22	Kevin Porter (7)	Washington Bullets	118–112	Atlanta Hawks	March 5, 1975	46	14	2	0	0	0	
22	Kevin Porter (8)	Detroit Pistons	126–130	San Antonio Spurs	December 23, 1978	45	10	1	2	0	0	
22	Phil Ford	Kansas City Kings	133–117	Milwaukee Bucks	February 21, 1979	44	5	5	5	0	6	
22	Kevin Porter (9)	Detroit Pistons	117–124	Chicago Bulls	February 27, 1979	44	32	5	4	0	4	
22	John Lucas (2)	Golden State Warriors	130–137	Denver Nuggets	February 27, 1981	36	13	5	1	2	4	
22	Allen Leavell	Houston Rockets	114–111	New Jersey Nets	January 25, 1983	41	24	7	1	0	5	(Note: Allen Leavell tied the opposing team in assists, 22–22.)
22	Magic Johnson* (7)	Los Angeles Lakers	127–114	Cleveland Cavaliers	November 17, 1983	37	23	9	3	1	2	
22	Ennis Whatley	Chicago Bulls	111–113	New York Knicks	January 14, 1984	41	8	5	4	0	3	
22	Ennis Whatley (2)	Chicago Bulls	102–98	Atlanta Hawks	March 3, 1984	37	10	2	2	0	4	(Note: Ennis Whatley passed for more assists than the opposing team, 22–18.)
22	John Stockton* (11)	Utah Jazz	107–101	Los Angeles Lakers	January 8, 1987	43	11	5	1	0	2	(Note: John Stockton passed for more assists than the opposing team, 22–18.)
22	Doc Rivers	Atlanta Hawks	118–109	Boston Celtics	May 16, 1988	38	14	4	3	0	1	
22	John Stockton* (12)	Utah Jazz	110–113	Cleveland Cavaliers	December 11, 1989	44	14	2	4	0	4	(Note: The game went to overtime.)
22	Magic Johnson* (8)	Los Angeles Lakers	123–125	Portland Trail Blazers	November 6, 1990	49	24	6	3	0	5	(Note: The game went to overtime.)
22	John Stockton* (13)	Utah Jazz	112–98	Philadelphia 76ers	December 18, 1992	32	17	2	2	0	1	(Note: John Stockton passed for more assists than the opposing team, 22–21.)
22	Sherman Douglas	Boston Celtics	135–112	Philadelphia 76ers	April 3, 1994	46	27	8	3	0	4	
22	Tim Hardaway*	Golden State Warriors	128–131	Orlando Magic	December 16, 1994	45	15	1	5	0	4	(Note: The game went to overtime.)
22	Robert Pack	New Jersey Nets	114–91	Dallas Mavericks	November 23, 1996	39:13	17	2	5	0	4	
22	Mark Jackson	Denver Nuggets	132–123	New Jersey Nets	January 20, 1997	39:35	21	7	0	0	2	
22	George McCloud	Denver Nuggets	109–104	Chicago Bulls	March 26, 2001	49:21	5	4	0	0	5	(Note: The game went to overtime.)
22	Andre Miller	Cleveland Cavaliers	91–94	Philadelphia 76ers	December 15, 2001	43:43	14	4	9	0	4	
22	Steve Nash* (2)	Phoenix Suns	133–140	New York Knicks	January 2, 2006	55:28	28	5	1	0	4	(Note: The game went to triple overtime.)
22	Chris Duhon	New York Knicks	138–125	Golden State Warriors	November 29, 2008	45:15	12	4	1	0	3	(Note: Chris Duhon passed for more assists than the opposing team, 22–21.)
22	Russell Westbrook (3)	Oklahoma City Thunder	114–101	Phoenix Suns	December 17, 2016	34:01	26	11	2	1	5	(Note: Russell Westbrook registered a triple-double. He passed for more assists than the opposing team, 22–16.)
22	Trae Young^	Atlanta Hawks	135–124	Cleveland Cavaliers	November 27, 2024	37	20	4	0	0	5	
22	Nikola Jokić^	Denver Nuggets	149–141	Phoenix Suns	March 7, 2025	44:55	31	21	3	0	4	(Note: Nikola Jokić recorded the first ever 30-20-20 triple-double. The game went into overtime.)
22	Isaiah Collier^	Utah Jazz	131–122	Indiana Pacers	February 3, 2026	27	14	6	0	1	2	

== See also ==
- NBA regular season records
- List of NCAA Division I men's basketball players with 20 or more assists in a game
