= Assist (basketball) =

Player who passes the ball to a scoring teammate

A shot taken from a pass that is successful would count as an assist for the passer

In basketball, an assist is attributed to a player who passes the ball to a teammate in a way that leads directly to a score by field goal, meaning that they were "assisting" in the basket. An assist is also credited when a basket is awarded due to defensive goaltending.

There is some judgment involved in deciding whether a passer should be credited with an assist. An assist can be scored for the passer even if the player who receives the pass makes a basket after dribbling the ball for a short distance. However, the original definition of an assist did not include such situations, so the comparison of assist statistics across eras is a complex matter.

Only the pass directly before the score may be counted as an assist, so no more than one assist can be recorded per field goal (unlike in other sports, such as ice hockey). A pass that leads to a shooting foul and scoring by free throws does not count as an assist in the NBA, but does in FIBA play (only one assist is awarded per set of free throws in which at least one free throw is made).

Point guards tend to get the most assists per game (apg), as their role is primarily that of a passer and ballhandler.

Centers tend to get fewer assists, but centers with good floor presence and court vision can dominate a team by assisting. Being inside the key, the center often has the best angles and the best position for "dishes" and other short passes in the scoring area. Current NBA center Nikola Jokić is among the league leaders in assists and play-making. Center Wilt Chamberlain led the NBA in total assists in 1968. A strong center with inside-scoring prowess, such as former NBA center Hakeem Olajuwon, can also be an effective assister because the defense's double-teaming tends to open up offense in the form of shooters.

The NBA single-game assist team record is 53, held by the Milwaukee Bucks, on December 26, 1978. The NBA single-game assist individual record is 30, held by Scott Skiles of the Orlando Magic on December 30, 1990.

The NBA record for most career assists is held by John Stockton, with 15,806. Stockton also holds the NBA single season assist per game record with 14.5 during the 1989–1990 regular season. The highest career assist per game average in NBA history is held by Magic Johnson, with 11.2 assists per game.

== See also ==
- List of NBA regular season records
- List of National Basketball Association career assists leaders
- List of National Basketball Association season assists leaders
- List of National Basketball Association players with most assists in a game
- List of National Basketball Association career playoff assists leaders
- List of NCAA Division I men's basketball career assists leaders
- List of NCAA Division I men's basketball season assists leaders
- List of NCAA Division I men's basketball players with 20 or more assists in a game
- List of NCAA Division I women's basketball career assists leaders
- List of NCAA Division I women's basketball season assists leaders
