= 2027 FIBA U16 AmeriCup (Centrobasket qualifiers) =

International youth basketball tournament

Tournament details
- Host country: Honduras
- City: Tegucigalpa
- Dates: 6–10 December 2026
- Teams: 6 (from 1 sub-confederation)
- Venue: 1 (in 1 host city)

Official website
- www.fiba.basketball

The Central American and Caribbean leg of the 2027 FIBA U16 AmeriCup qualifiers marks the first edition of this competition. The Central American and Caribbean qualifiers replaced the FIBA U15 Centrobasket and, unlike the previous format, they do not include the top Central American and Caribbean teams. Therefore, Dominican Republic and Puerto Rico will not participate in this tournament, having already secured direct qualification for the 2027 FIBA U16 AmeriCup based on the historical ranking.

The tournament will be played at Coliseo Nacional de Ingenieros in Tegucigalpa, Honduras, from 6 to 10 December 2026. In this tournament, U15 teams will compete to qualify for next year's FIBA U16 AmeriCup, with the winning team qualifying directly, while the second berth may be awarded depending on the designation of the host nation for the continental tournament, which will be announced at a later date.

== Participating teams ==
- Costa Rica
- Honduras
- Mexico
- Nicaragua
- Panama
- Trinidad and Tobago

== Tournament format ==
All teams will play a round-robin tournament in a single group. The final standings of the group will also determine the final standings of the tournament.

== Standings ==
Pos	Team	Pld	W	L	PF	PA	PD	Pts	Qualification
1st place, gold medalist(s)	Costa Rica	0	0	0	0	0	0	0	2027 FIBA U16 AmeriCup
2nd place, silver medalist(s)	Honduras (H)	0	0	0	0	0	0	0	Possible 2027 FIBA U16 AmeriCup
3rd place, bronze medalist(s)	Mexico	0	0	0	0	0	0	0	
4	Nicaragua	0	0	0	0	0	0	0	
5	Panama	0	0	0	0	0	0	0	
6	Trinidad and Tobago	0	0	0	0	0	0	0	

First match(es) will be played: 6 December 2026. Source: FIBA
(H) Hosts

== Schedule ==
All times are local (Central Standard Time; UTC−6).

6 December 2026
15:00

Costa Rica	vs.	Mexico
Scoring by quarter: –, –, –, –

Coliseo Nacional de Ingenieros

6 December 2026
17:30

Trinidad and Tobago	vs.	Panama
Scoring by quarter: –, –, –, –

Coliseo Nacional de Ingenieros

6 December 2026
20:00

Nicaragua	vs.	Honduras
Scoring by quarter: –, –, –, –

Coliseo Nacional de Ingenieros

7 December 2026
15:00

Panama	vs.	Costa Rica
Scoring by quarter: –, –, –, –

Coliseo Nacional de Ingenieros

7 December 2026
17:30

Mexico	vs.	Nicaragua
Scoring by quarter: –, –, –, –

Coliseo Nacional de Ingenieros

7 December 2026
20:00

Honduras	vs.	Trinidad and Tobago
Scoring by quarter: –, –, –, –

Coliseo Nacional de Ingenieros

8 December 2026
15:00

Nicaragua	vs.	Costa Rica
Scoring by quarter: –, –, –, –

Coliseo Nacional de Ingenieros

8 December 2026
17:30

Trinidad and Tobago	vs.	Mexico
Scoring by quarter: –, –, –, –

Coliseo Nacional de Ingenieros

8 December 2026
20:00

Honduras	vs.	Panama
Scoring by quarter: –, –, –, –

Coliseo Nacional de Ingenieros

9 December 2026
15:00

Panama	vs.	Nicaragua
Scoring by quarter: –, –, –, –

Coliseo Nacional de Ingenieros

9 December 2026
17:30

Costa Rica	vs.	Trinidad and Tobago
Scoring by quarter: –, –, –, –

Coliseo Nacional de Ingenieros

9 December 2026
20:00

Mexico	vs.	Honduras
Scoring by quarter: –, –, –, –

Coliseo Nacional de Ingenieros

10 December 2026
15:00

Nicaragua	vs.	Trinidad and Tobago
Scoring by quarter: –, –, –, –

Coliseo Nacional de Ingenieros

10 December 2026
17:30

Mexico	vs.	Panama
Scoring by quarter: –, –, –, –

Coliseo Nacional de Ingenieros

10 December 2026
20:00

Honduras	vs.	Costa Rica
Scoring by quarter: –, –, –, –

Coliseo Nacional de Ingenieros
