= 2019 Americas Rugby Challenge =

- Date: 25 – 31 August 2019
- Countries: Cayman Islands; Colombia; Mexico; Paraguay

Final positions
- Champions: Colombia

Tournament statistics
- Matches played: 6

The 2019 Americas Rugby Challenge or ARCh 2019 was the second edition of the Americas Rugby Challenge, a men's rugby union international tournament for tier 2 teams in North and South America. The second edition was confirmed in June 2019, to be played at the Estadio Cincuentenario in Medellín, Colombia from August 25 to 31.

The competition brings together Rugby Americas North (RAN) and Sudamérica Rugby, following the example of the Americas Rugby Championship (ARC). The Americas Rugby Challenge is officially the ‘B’ competition for the ARC. For the 2019 edition, the host nation, Colombia, was joined by Sudamérica Rugby rivals Paraguay while the Cayman Islands and Mexico represented Rugby Americas North. The Cayman Islands joined the competition after winning a playoff against Guyana, 58–14 in George Town in February 2019. Columbia won the tournament achieving bonus point victories in all three of their matches.

== Format ==
All four nations play each other once in a single-round robin.

== Teams ==
- Cayman Islands
- Colombia
- Mexico
- Paraguay

== Table ==
Champions

Place	Nation	Games				Points			Try BP	Losing BP	Table points
Place	Nation	played	won	drawn	lost	for	against	diff	Try BP	Losing BP	Table points
1	Colombia	3	3	0	0	188	46	+142	3	0	15
2	Mexico	3	2	0	1	164	85	+79	3	0	11
3	Paraguay	3	1	0	2	99	96	+3	1	0	5
4	Cayman Islands	3	0	0	3	20	245	–225	0	0	0
Points were awarded to the teams as follows: Win – 4 points Draw – 2 points At least 3 or more tries than opponent – 1 point Loss within 7 points – 1 point Loss greater than 7 points – 0 points

== Fixtures ==
=== Match day 1 ===
25 August 2019

Paraguay	27–35	Mexico
	Report

Estadio Cincuentenario, Medellín

25 August 2019

Colombia	83–6	Cayman Islands
	Report

Estadio Cincuentenario, Medellín

=== Match day 2 ===
28 August 2019

Paraguay	57–7	Cayman Islands
	Report

Estadio Cincuentenario, Medellín

28 August 2019

Colombia	51–24	Mexico
	Report

Estadio Cincuentenario, Medellín

=== Match day 3 ===
31 August 2019

Mexico	105–7	Cayman Islands
	Report

Estadio Cincuentenario, Medellín

31 August 2019

Colombia	54–15	Paraguay
	Report

Estadio Cincuentenario, Medellín
