= Bettiga =

Bettiga is an Italian surname. Notable people with the surname include:

- Mike Bettiga (born 1950), American football player
- Valentín Bettiga (born 1999), Argentine basketball player
