= 2018 Americas Rugby Challenge =

- Date: 24 August – 1 September 2018
- Countries: Colombia; Guyana; Mexico; Paraguay

Final positions
- Champions: Colombia

Tournament statistics
- Matches played: 6
- Top scorer(s): (Colombia) José Manuel Diosa (54)
- Most tries: (Colombia) Neider García (5)

The 2018 Americas Rugby Challenge or ARCh 2018 was the inaugural edition of the Americas Rugby Challenge, a men's rugby union international tournament for tier 2 teams in North and South America. The inaugural edition was confirmed in August 2018, to be played at the Estadio Cincuentenario in Medellín, Colombia from August 24 to September 1.

The competition brings together Rugby Americas North (RAN) and Sudamérica Rugby, following the example of the Americas Rugby Championship (ARC). The Americas Rugby Challenge is officially the ‘B’ competition for the ARC.

As is the case of the Americas Rugby Championship, the new Americas Rugby Challenge saw all countries playing against each other. The first edition of the competition was a Four Nations tournament with Rugby Americas North and Sudamérica Rugby both having two representatives each.

The host nation, Colombia, was joined by Sudamérica Rugby rivals Paraguay. Guyana and Mexico represented Rugby Americas North. Colombia won the first edition.

== Teams ==
- Colombia
- Paraguay
- Mexico
- Guyana

== Table ==
Champions

| Place | Nation | Games | | | | Points | | | Try BP | Losing BP | Table points |
| Place | Nation | played | won | drawn | lost | for | against | diff | Try BP | Losing BP | Table points |
|---|---|---|---|---|---|---|---|---|---|---|---|
| 1 | Colombia | 3 | 3 | 0 | 0 | 160 | 36 | +124 | 3 | 0 | 15 |
| 2 | Paraguay | 3 | 2 | 0 | 1 | 160 | 87 | +73 | 3 | 0 | 11 |
| 3 | Mexico | 3 | 1 | 0 | 2 | 84 | 126 | –42 | 2 | 0 | 6 |
| 4 | Guyana | 3 | 0 | 0 | 3 | 50 | 205 | –155 | 1 | 0 | 1 |
Points were awarded to the teams as follows: Win – 4 points Draw – 2 points At least 3 or more tries than opponent – 1 point Loss within 7 points – 1 point Loss greater than 7 points – 0 points

== Fixtures ==
=== Match day 1 ===
26 August 2018

| (1 TBP) Paraguay | 45–36 | Mexico (1 TBP) |
| Try: S. Alvarenga 2 (8’, 46’), S. Urbieta (18’), C. Plate 2 (38’, 56’); Con: S. Urbieta 2/3 (9’, 39’), S. Alvarenga 2/2 (47’, 57’); Pen: S. Urbieta 0/2, S. Alverenga 2/3 (40’, 74’); Drop: S. Alvarenga 2/2 (51’, 67’) | Report | Try: J. Martínez 2 (16’, 22’), R. Ripoll (32’), T. Allen (69’), F. Guerrero (78’); Con: F. Guerrero 4/5 (17’, 23’, 70’, 79’); Pen: F. Guerrero 1/1 (60’) |

Estadio Cincuentenario, Medellín

26 August 2018

| (1 TBP) Colombia | 71–7 | Guyana |
| Try: N. García 2 (5’, 14’), J. Diosa 3 (12’, 30’, 39’), Se. Mejía (34’), B. Campiño (37’), A. Álvarez 2 (46’, 59’), B. Pérez (69’), Jo. Álvarez (73’), J. Giraldo (80’); Con: J. Diosa 2/7 (15’, 40’), E. Bedoya 2/4 (70’, 74’); Pen: J. Diosa 1/1 (9’) | Report | Try: J. Rahaman (63’); Con: R. Gonsalves 1/1 (64’) |

Estadio Cincuentenario, Medellín

=== Match day 2 ===
29 August 2018

| Guyana | 7–86 | Paraguay |
| | Report |

Estadio Cincuentenario, Medellín

29 August 2018

| Colombia | 45–0 | Mexico |
| | Report |

Estadio Cincuentenario, Medellín

=== Match day 3 ===
1 September 2018

| Colombia | 44–29 | Paraguay |
| | Report |

Estadio Cincuentenario, Medellín

1 September 2018

| Mexico | 48–36 | Guyana |
| | Report |

Estadio Cincuentenario, Medellín
