= Eric Ayala =

American-Puerto Rican basketball player

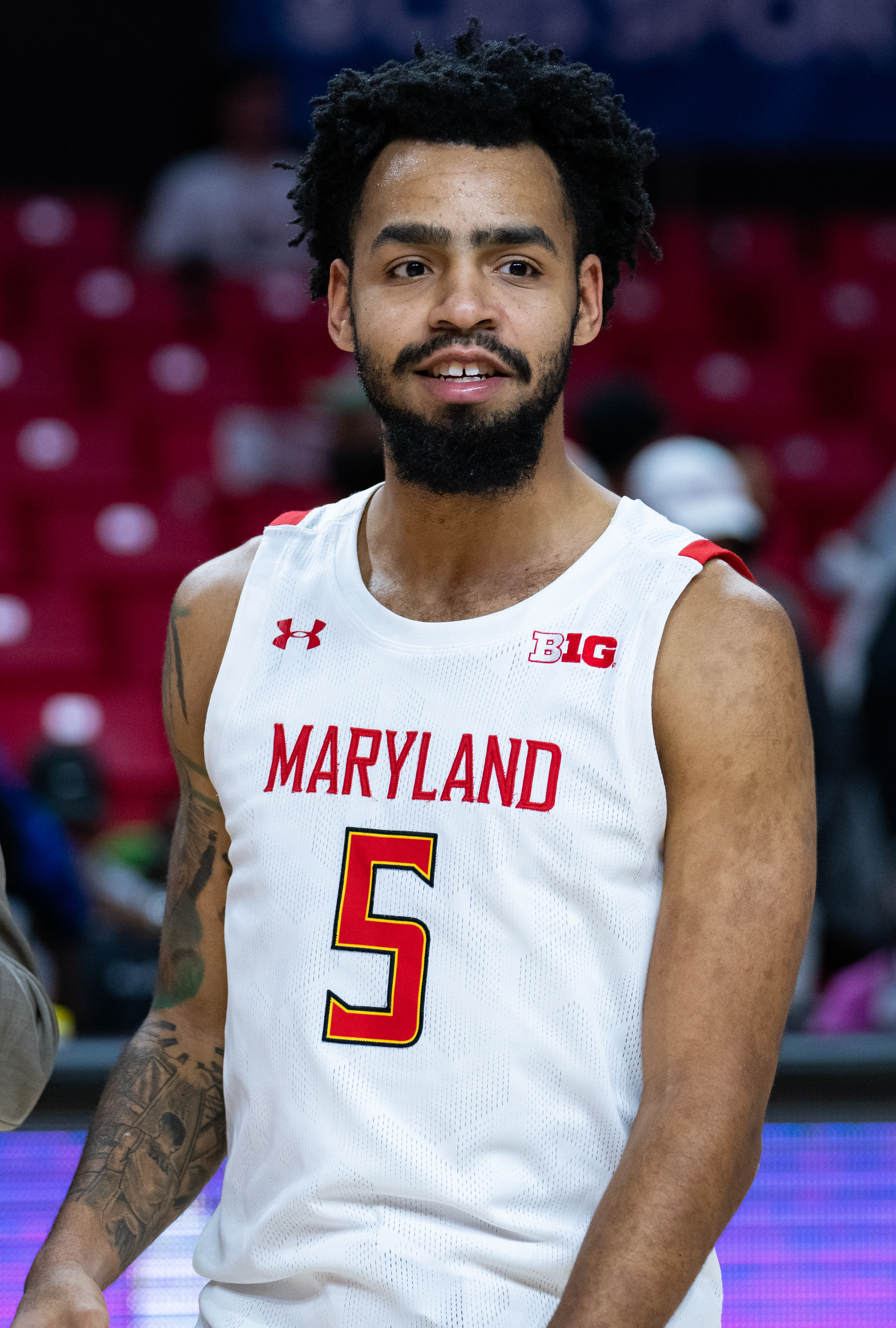
- Ayala with Maryland in 2022

No. 55 – Mets de Guaynabo
- Position: Shooting guard
- League: Baloncesto Superior Nacional

Personal information
- Born: January 2, 1999 (age 27)
- Listed height: 6 ft 5 in (1.96 m)
- Listed weight: 205 lb (93 kg)

Career information
- High school: Sanford School (Hockessin, Delaware); Putnam Science Academy (Putnam, Connecticut); IMG Academy (Bradenton, Florida)
- College: Maryland (2018–2022)
- NBA draft: 2022: undrafted
- Playing career: 2022–present

Career history
- 2022: Atléticos de San Germán
- 2022–2023: Keflavík
- 2023–2025: Atléticos de San Germán
- 2025–2026: Rio Grande Valley Vipers
- 2026: Capital City Go-Go
- 2026–present: Mets de Guaynabo

Eric Ayala (born January 2, 1999) is a Puerto Rican professional basketball player for the Mets de Guaynabo of the Baloncesto Superior Nacional (BSN). He played college basketball for the Maryland Terrapins.

== High school career ==
Ayala played basketball for Sanford School in Hockessin, Delaware. After his sophomore season, he transferred to Putnam Science Academy in Putnam, Connecticut. Ayala played a postgraduate season at IMG Academy in Bradenton, Florida. A consensus four-star recruit, he committed to playing college basketball for Maryland over offers from Miami (Florida) and Oregon.

== College career ==
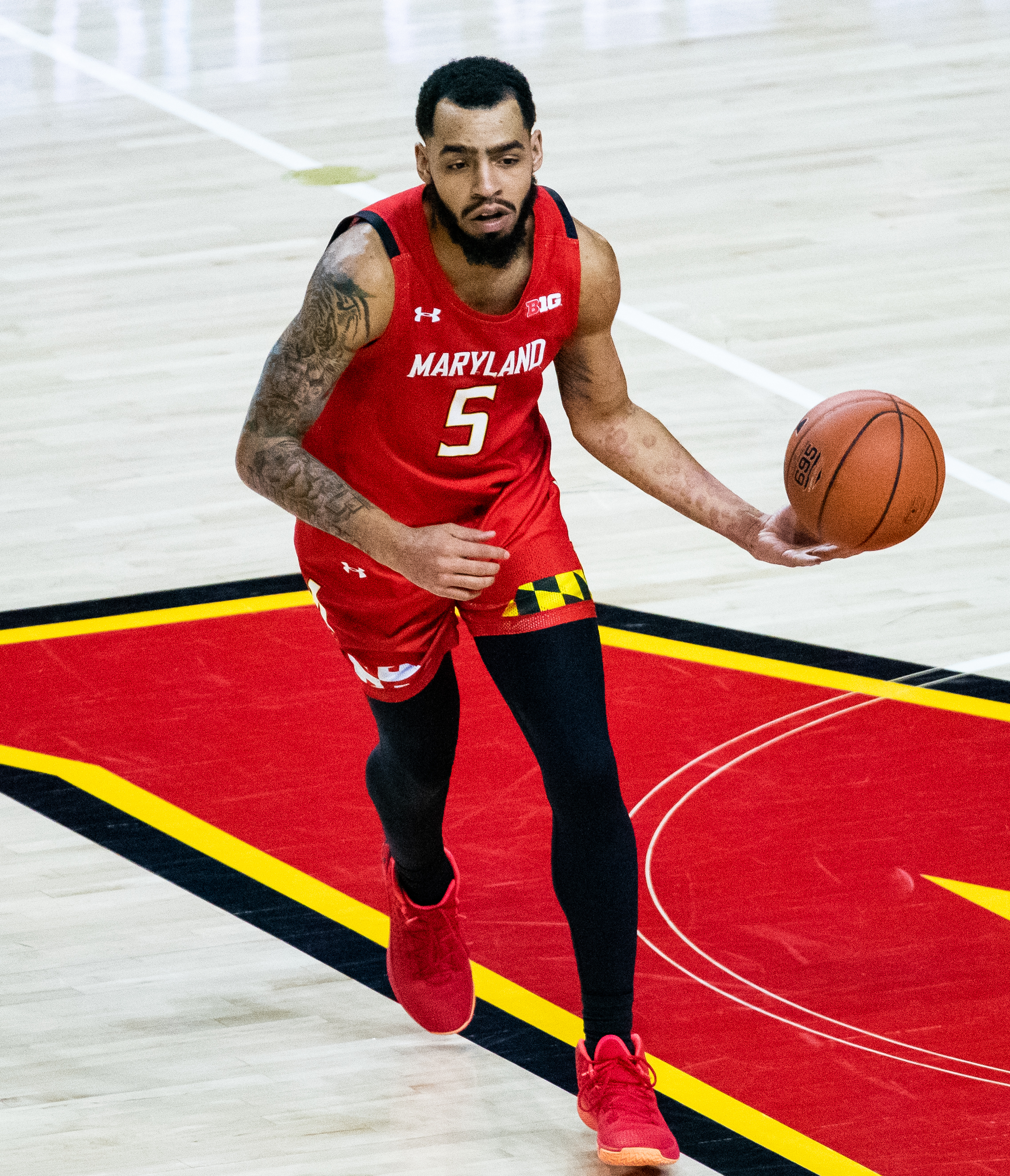
Ayala in January 2020

As a freshman, Ayala became a regular starter at Maryland, averaging 8.6 points, 2.9 rebounds and 2.1 assists per game. In his sophomore season, he averaged 8.5 points, 2.9 rebounds and 2.5 assists per game, shooting 35.8 percent from the field. In his junior season, he became his team's primary point guard with the departure of Anthony Cowan Jr. Ayala averaged 15.1 points, 4.3 rebounds and 2.2 assists per game as a junior, earning All-Big Ten honorable mention. He declared for the 2021 NBA draft while maintaining his college eligibility, before ultimately returning. Ayala was named Honorable Mention All-Big Ten by the media as a senior.

== Professional career ==
In September 2022, Ayala signed with Keflavík of the Icelandic Úrvalsdeild karla after originally having signed with Sopron during the summer.

In the summer of 2025, Ayala joined his alma mater's alumni basketball team, Shell Shock, in The Basketball Tournament. Ayala helped the team reach the Elite 8 before losing the Best Virginia.

== National team career ==
Ayala represented Puerto Rico at the 2015 FIBA Americas Under-16 Championship in Argentina, averaging 19.6 points, 6.8 rebounds and 2.8 assists per game.

== Career statistics ==
Legend
GP	Games played	GS	Games started	MPG	Minutes per game
FG%	Field goal percentage	3P%	3-point field goal percentage	FT%	Free throw percentage
RPG	Rebounds per game	APG	Assists per game	SPG	Steals per game
BPG	Blocks per game	PPG	Points per game	**Bold**	Career high

=== College ===
Year	Team	GP	GS	MPG	FG%	3P%	FT%	RPG	APG	SPG	BPG	PPG
2018–19	Maryland	**34**	**33**	29.0	.430	**.406**	.774	2.9	2.1	.3	**.3**	8.6
2019–20	Maryland	31	20	27.8	.358	.274	.725	2.9	**2.5**	.4	.1	8.5
2020–21	Maryland	29	28	**33.6**	**.437**	.337	**.831**	4.3	2.2	**1.2**	.1	**15.1**
2021–22	Maryland	31	29	33.4	.383	.339	.688	**4.6**	2.1	0.8	.1	14.7
Career		125	110	30.9	.402	.337	.758	3.7	2.2	.6	.2	11.6
