= Valentín Bettiga =

Argentine basketball player

Personal information
- Born: October 9, 1999 (age 27) Coronel Pringles, Argentina
- Listed height: 6 ft 4 in (1.93 m)
- Listed weight: 202 lb (92 kg)

Career information
- Playing career: 2015–present
- Position: Shooting guard

Career history
- 2015–2017: Club Olimpo
- 2018: Club Alianza Viedma
- 2018–2023: Ferro Carril Oeste
- 2023: Félix Pérez Cardozo
- 2023–present: Ferro Carril Oeste

Valentín Bettiga (born October 9, 1999) is an Argentine professional basketball player for Ferro Carril Oeste of the Liga Nacional de Básquet (LNB), the top division of Argentine basketball.

== Professional career ==
Some of the clubs Bettiga played with professionally included: Club Olimpo (2015–17), Club Alianza Viedma (2018), and Ferro Carril Oeste (2018–23), all of them in the Argentine League.

== National team career ==
Bettiga defended Argentina at the 2015 FIBA Americas Under-16 Championship. The event was held from 10 to 14 June 2015 in Bahía Blanca, Argentina and the locals won a bronze medal.
