= El Salvador men's national under-15 basketball team =

El Salvador
- FIBA zone: FIBA Americas
- National federation: Federación Salvadoreña de Baloncesto

U17 World Cup
- Appearances: None

U16 AmeriCup
- Appearances: None

U15 Centrobasket
- Appearances: 3
- Medals: None

The El Salvador men's national under-15 basketball team is a national basketball team of El Salvador, administered by the Federación Salvadoreña de Baloncesto. It represents the country in men's international under-15 basketball competitions.

== FIBA U15 Centrobasket participations ==
Year	Result
2011	5th
2012	5th
2024	6th

== See also ==
- El Salvador men's national basketball team
- El Salvador men's national under-17 basketball team
- El Salvador women's national under-15 and under-16 basketball team
