= Puerto Rican Basketball Federation =

Governing body of basketball in Puerto Rico

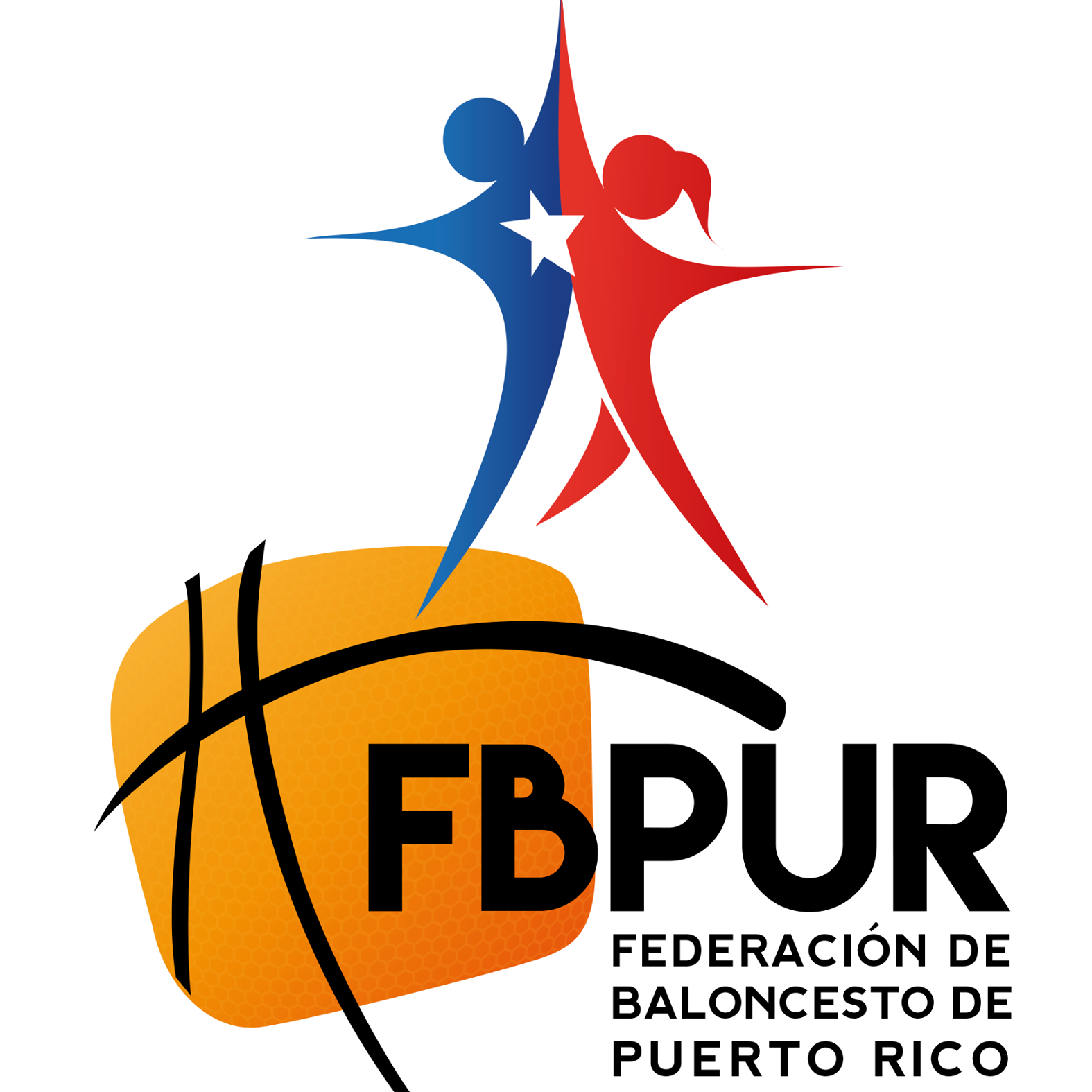
- Sport: Basketball
- Jurisdiction: Puerto Rico
- Abbreviation: FBPUR
- Affiliation: FIBA
- Affiliation date: 1957
- Regional affiliation: FIBA Americas
- Headquarters: San Juan
- President: Yum Ramos
- Men's coach: Vacant
- Women's coach: Gerardo Batista

Official website
- www.puertorico.basketball
- (Puerto Rico)

The Puerto Rican Basketball Federation (Spanish: Federación de Baloncesto de Puerto Rico or FBPR) is the governing body of basketball in the territory of Puerto Rico. As of October 18, 2021 the Puerto Rican men's national basketball team is ranked 19th in the world.

== History and Responsibilities ==
The association has been a member of the Fédération Internationale de Basketball (FIBA) since 1957 and is therefore also a member of FIBA Americas. The current president of the association is Yum E. Ramos Perales. Its general secretary is Edmundo Baez Rivera.

The association organizes the National Championship and is responsible for the Puerto Rican national basketball team and the Puerto Rican women's national basketball team.

== See also ==
- Puerto Rico men's national basketball team
- Puerto Rico women's national basketball team
- Puerto Rico men's national under-16 basketball team
