= 2015 FIBA Americas Under-16 Championship =

Men's basketball competition

4th FIBA Under-16 Americas Basketball Championship

Tournament details
- Host country: Argentina
- City: Bahia Blanca
- Dates: 10–14 June
- Teams: 8 (from 1 confederation)
- Venue: 1 (in 1 host city)

Final positions
- Champions: United States (4th title)
- Runners-up: Canada
- Third place: Argentina

Tournament statistics
- MVP: (United States) Gary Trent Jr.
- Top scorer: (Puerto Rico) Ayala (19.6)
- Top rebounds: (Canada) Shittu (11.4)
- Top assists: (Brazil) Dos Santos (4.4)
- PPG (Team): United States (107.8)
- RPG (Team): United States (60.2)
- APG (Team): United States (15.2)

Official website
- Official website

The 2015 FIBA Americas Under-16 Championship was the men's international basketball competition that was held in Bahia Blanca, Argentina from 10 to 14 June 2015.

== First round ==
All times are local (UTC−3).

=== Group A ===
Pos	Team	Pld	W	L	PF	PA	PD	Pts	Qualification
1	United States	3	3	0	343	188	+155	6	Advance to Semifinals
2	Dominican Republic	3	2	1	188	239	−51	5	Advance to Semifinals
3	Puerto Rico	3	1	2	202	251	−49	4	Classification 5–8
4	Brazil	3	0	3	216	271	−55	3	Classification 5–8

Source: FIBA

10 June 2015
16:00

Boxscore

United States	105–54	Puerto Rico
Scoring by quarter: 29–17, 25–12, 26–14, 25–11
Pts: Howard 19; Rebs: Vanderbilt 10; Asts: Jones 4		Pts: Ayala 16; Rebs: Pérez 7 Asts: Placer 2

Estadio Osvaldo Casanova, Bahia Blanca

10 June 2015
18:15

Boxscore

Brazil	58–66	Dominican Republic
Scoring by quarter: 12–17, 17–17, 15–20, 14–12
Pts: Y. Dos Santos 15; Rebs: Abreu, Goncalves 8 Asts: Y. Dos Santos 5		Pts: Frink 22; Rebs: Díaz 12; Asts: Segura 3

Estadio Osvaldo Casanova, Bahia Blanca

11 June 2015
13:45

Boxscore

Dominican Republic	51–115	United States
Scoring by quarter: 17–33, 5–35, 10–26, 19–21
Pts: Mirambeaux 13; Rebs: Mirambeaux 9 Asts: 4 players 1		Pts: Trent Jr. 25; Rebs: Jones 10; Asts: Carter Jr., Jones 5

Estadio Osvaldo Casanova, Bahia Blanca

11 June 2015
16:00

Boxscore

Puerto Rico	82–75	Brazil
Scoring by quarter: 17–16, 13–20, 26–9, 26–30
Pts: Ayala 24; Rebs: Ayala 8 Asts: Rodríguez 6		Pts: Goncalves 27; Rebs: Goncalves 10; Asts: Y. Dos Santos 4

Estadio Osvaldo Casanova, Bahia Blanca

12 June 2015
13:45

Boxscore

Dominican Republic	71–66	Puerto Rico
Scoring by quarter: 19–15, 12–17, 19–16, 21–18
Pts: Frink 16; Rebs: Frink 11; Asts: Rivera 3		Pts: Ayala 22; Rebs: Carrillo 10; Asts: Ayala, Placer 2

Estadio Osvaldo Casanova, Bahia Blanca

12 June 2015
18:15

Boxscore

United States	123–83	Brazil
Scoring by quarter: 27–21, 36–11, 34–13, 26–38
Pts: Carter Jr. 21; Rebs: Hill 12; Asts: Jones 4		Pts: Santos 24; Rebs: Abreu 6 Asts: Nunes 5

Estadio Osvaldo Casanova, Bahia Blanca

=== Group B ===
Pos	Team	Pld	W	L	PF	PA	PD	Pts	Qualification
1	Canada	3	3	0	261	181	+80	6	Advance to Semifinals
2	Argentina	3	2	1	218	197	+21	5	Advance to Semifinals
3	Mexico	3	1	2	222	256	−34	4	Classification 5–8
4	Venezuela	3	0	3	176	243	−67	3	Classification 5–8

Source: FIBA

10 June 2015
13:45

Boxscore

Venezuela	55–84	Canada
Scoring by quarter: 6–29, 22–18, 7–25, 20–12
Pts: Páez 14; Rebs: Sulbarán 7 Asts: 3 players 1		Pts: Djurick 17; Rebs: Djurick 11; Asts: Nembhard 2

Estadio Osvaldo Casanova, Bahia Blanca

10 June 2015
20:30

Boxscore

Argentina	85–70	Mexico
Scoring by quarter: 23–17, 19–11, 17–24, 26–18
Pts: Basualdo, López 20; Rebs: Basualdo 9 Asts: Zandomeni 5		Pts: S. Martínez 24; Rebs: De La Serna 9 Asts: Landin, Willis 3

Estadio Osvaldo Casanova, Bahia Blanca

11 June 2015
18:15

Boxscore

Canada	101–64	Mexico
Scoring by quarter: 20–7, 24–23, 29–10, 28–24
Pts: Barrett 22; Rebs: Shittu 17; Asts: Nembhard 5		Pts: S. Martínez 27; Rebs: 3 players 5 Asts: S. Martínez 2

Estadio Osvaldo Casanova, Bahia Blanca

11 June 2015
20:30

Boxscore

Venezuela	51–71	Argentina
Scoring by quarter: 4–15, 18–10, 12–23, 17–23
Pts: Lenuz 11; Rebs: Pino 9 Asts: Páez 2		Pts: López 19; Rebs: Basualdo 15; Asts: Baralle 4

Estadio Osvaldo Casanova, Bahia Blanca

12 June 2015
16:00

Boxscore

Mexico	88–70	Venezuela
Scoring by quarter: 23–15, 18–16, 35–22, 12–17
Pts: S. Martínez 15; Rebs: Pontón 7 Asts: Willis 7		Pts: Lenuz, Pino 15; Rebs: Á. Rodríguez 8 Asts: Sulbarán 2

Estadio Osvaldo Casanova, Bahia Blanca

12 June 2015
20:30

Boxscore

Argentina	62–76	Canada
Scoring by quarter: 16–25, 17–11, 17–22, 12–18
Pts: López 23; Rebs: Basualdo 10; Asts: Basualdo, López 4		Pts: Shittu 15; Rebs: Shittu 8 Asts: Nembhard 3

Estadio Osvaldo Casanova, Bahia Blanca

== Final round ==
=== Classification 5–8 ===
13 June 2015
13:45

Boxscore

Puerto Rico	81–70	Venezuela
Scoring by quarter: 21–18, 12–16, 22–27, 26–9
Pts: Ayala 29; Rebs: Natal 12; Asts: Ayala 6		Pts: Lenuz 17; Rebs: 3 players 7 Asts: Mora, Páez 3

Estadio Osvaldo Casanova, Bahia Blanca

13 June 2015
16:00

Boxscore

Mexico	69–80	Brazil
Scoring by quarter: 16–14, 17–20, 12–14, 24–32
Pts: S. Martínez 18; Rebs: Alvarez 13; Asts: A. Martínez, Willis 2		Pts: Silva 19; Rebs: Nunes 13; Asts: Y. Dos Santos 8

Estadio Osvaldo Casanova, Bahia Blanca

=== Semifinals ===
13 June 2015
18:15

Boxscore

Canada	95–49	Dominican Republic
Scoring by quarter: 25–16, 20–11, 25–14, 25–8
Pts: Barrett 17; Rebs: Shittu 12; Asts: Nembhard 6		Pts: Frink 15; Rebs: Herrera 5 Asts: Melo 3

Estadio Osvaldo Casanova, Bahia Blanca

13 June 2015
20:30

Boxscore

United States	119–76	Argentina
Scoring by quarter: 33–17, 27–9, 32–22, 27–28
Pts: Brown, Howard 16; Rebs: Carter Jr., Vanderbilt 7 Asts: Howard 5		Pts: Pérez 20; Rebs: Bettiga 6 Asts: Bettiga 4

Estadio Osvaldo Casanova, Bahia Blanca

== Final classification games ==
=== Seventh place game ===
14 June 2015
12:45

Boxscore

Venezuela	80–71	Mexico
Scoring by quarter: 13–6, 15–20, 23–17, 29–28
Pts: Mora 17; Rebs: Pino, Á. Rodríguez 10; Asts: Páez 7		Pts: Landin 15; Rebs: A. Martínez 15; Asts: Landin 3

Estadio Osvaldo Casanova, Bahia Blanca

=== Fifth place game ===
14 June 2015
15:00

Boxscore

Puerto Rico	43–62	Brazil
Scoring by quarter: 14–14, 7–14, 13–21, 9–13
Pts: Quiñonez 16; Rebs: Millet 5 Asts: Ayala, Placer 3		Pts: Goncalves 19; Rebs: Goncalves 14; Asts: Y. Dos Santos, Santos 4

Estadio Osvaldo Casanova, Bahia Blanca

=== Bronze medal game ===
14 June 2015
17:15

Boxscore

Argentina	74–59	Dominican Republic
Scoring by quarter: 18–20, 16–15, 17–14, 23–10
Pts: Baralle, López 15; Rebs: Bettiga 9 Asts: López 3		Pts: Frink 26; Rebs: Frink 8 Asts: Benítez, Rivera 2

Estadio Osvaldo Casanova, Bahia Blanca

=== Final ===
14 June 2015
19:30

Boxscore

United States	77–60	Canada
Scoring by quarter: 3–19, 24–18, 22–14, 28–9
Pts: Trent Jr., Vanderbilt 19; Rebs: Carter Jr., Vanderbilt 10; Asts: Jones 3		Pts: Shittu 18; Rebs: Shittu 14; Asts: 3 players 2

Estadio Osvaldo Casanova, Bahia Blanca

== Awards ==
Most Valuable Player
(United States) Gary Trent Jr.

== Final ranking ==
Qualified for the 2016 FIBA Under-17 World Championship.

Rank	Team	Record
1st place, gold medalist(s)	United States	5–0
2nd place, silver medalist(s)	Canada	4–1
3rd place, bronze medalist(s)	Argentina	3–2
4	Dominican Republic	2–3
5	Brazil	2–3
6	Puerto Rico	2–3
7	Venezuela	1–4
8	Mexico	1–4
