= Romeo Weems =

American basketball player (born 2001)

No. 0 – Motor City Cruise
- Position: Power forward
- League: NBA G League

Personal information
- Born: June 9, 2001 (age 25) Detroit, Michigan, U.S.
- Listed height: 6 ft 7 in (2.01 m)
- Listed weight: 215 lb (98 kg)

Career information
- High school: New Haven (New Haven, Michigan)
- College: DePaul (2019–2021)
- NBA draft: 2021: undrafted
- Playing career: 2021–present

Career history
- 2021–2023: Memphis Hustle
- 2023–2026: Rip City Remix
- 2026–present: Motor City Cruise

Career highlights
- Big East All-Freshman team (2020); Mr. Basketball of Michigan (2019)
- Stats at NBA.com
- Stats at Basketball Reference
Medals
Men's basketball
Representing the United States
FIBA Under-17 World Cup
Gold medal – first place	2018 Argentina	Team
FIBA Americas U16 Championship
Gold medal – first place	2017 Argentina	Team

Romeo Jajuan Weems (born June 9, 2001) is an American professional basketball player for the Motor City Cruise of the NBA G League. He played college basketball for the DePaul Blue Demons.

== Early life ==
Weems grew up in Detroit, Michigan and attended New Haven High School in New Haven, Michigan, where he was a four-year starter on the basketball team. As a freshman in 2015–16, he started in all 25 games and averaged 16 points, 10.7 rebounds, 5.1 assists, 4 steals and 1.8 blocks to help his team to a 22–3 record, a regional championship and the state Class B quarterfinals. As a sophomore in 2016–17, he started in all 28 games and averaged 18.1 points, 11.8 rebounds, 3.6 assists, 3.7 steals and 3.2 blocks to help his team to a 27–1 record, a second-straight regional title and a Class B state title. He averaged 23.5 points, 10.8 rebounds, 5.3 assists, 4.8 steals and 2 blocks per game and was named All-Michigan by USA Today in his junior season. As a senior, Weems averaged 27.9 points, 11.4 rebounds, 4.2 steals, 3.5 assists and 2.6 blocks per game and was named the Associated Press Division 2 Player of the Year and Mr. Basketball of Michigan. Weems finished his high school career with 2,151 points scored. Weems was considered to be a Top 50 recruit in his class and committed to playing college basketball for DePaul over offers from Michigan, Michigan State, Ohio State and Oregon.

== College career ==
As a freshman, Weems averaged 8 points, 1.7 assists, 4.9 rebounds and 1.3 steals per game and was named to the Big East Conference All-Freshman team. He was named the conference Freshman of the Week after a nine-point, five-rebound, three-block game in a 93–78 victory over Iowa on November 11, 2019, and scoring nine points with eight rebounds and four assists in a 75–54 win against Cornell on November 16, 2019. Weems repeated as Freshman of the Week after scoring 17 points, 11 rebounds, three steals and two assists in a 72–67 win over Boston College. As a sophomore, Weems averaged 7.3 points and 5 rebounds per game. On April 7, 2021, he declared for the 2021 NBA draft, forgoing his remaining college eligibility.

== Professional career ==
After going undrafted in the 2021 NBA draft, Weems joined the Memphis Grizzlies for the 2021 NBA Summer League and on October 8, he signed with the Grizzlies. However, he was waived on October 15. On October 23, he signed with the Memphis Hustle as an affiliate player.

On June 8, 2023, Weems was selected by the Rip City Remix in the 2023–24 NBA G League Expansion Draft and on October 30, he officially joined the team. In the 2025-26 season, he averaged 7.2 points, 5.1 rebounds, 1.3 assists and 1.1 steals per game for the Remix. On September 24, 2026, the Motor City Cruise acquired the returning player right to Weems.

== National team career ==
Weems played for United States National Team as they won the 2017 FIBA Under-16 Americas Championship. He was a starter for Team USA and averaged 8.6 points and 8.1 rebounds per game when they won the 2018 FIBA U17 World Cup.

== Career statistics ==
Legend
GP	Games played	GS	Games started	MPG	Minutes per game
FG%	Field goal percentage	3P%	3-point field goal percentage	FT%	Free throw percentage
RPG	Rebounds per game	APG	Assists per game	SPG	Steals per game
BPG	Blocks per game	PPG	Points per game	**Bold**	Career high

=== College ===
Year	Team	GP	GS	MPG	FG%	3P%	FT%	RPG	APG	SPG	BPG	PPG
2019–20	DePaul	**32**	**32**	**30.1**	**.427**	.365	.607	4.9	**1.7**	**1.3**	**.8**	**8.0**
2020–21	DePaul	18	15	28.6	.376	**.366**	**.696**	**5.0**	.9	**1.3**	.6	7.3
Career		50	47	29.5	.408	.365	.633	4.9	1.4	1.3	.7	7.7
