= 2022 FIBA U15 Centrobasket =

International youth basketball tournament

Tournament details
- Host country: Puerto Rico
- City: Gurabo
- Dates: 18–22 June 2022
- Teams: 6 (from 1 confederation)
- Venue(s): 1 (in 1 host city)

Final positions
- Champions: Puerto Rico (4th title)
- Runners-up: Dominican Republic
- Third place: Mexico

Official website
- www.fiba.basketball/history

The 2022 FIBA U15 Centrobasket was the sixth edition of the Central American and Caribbean basketball championship for men's under-15 national teams. The tournament was played at Coliseo Fernando Rube Hernandez in Gurabo, Puerto Rico, from 18 to 22 June 2022.

== Participating teams ==
- Bahamas
- Costa Rica
- Dominican Republic
- Mexico
- Puerto Rico
- Turks and Caicos Islands

== Tournament format ==
All six teams played a round-robin tournament in one group. The winner of the group became the 2022 FIBA U15 Centrobasket champion.

== Final standings ==
Pos	Team	Pld	W	L	PF	PA	PD	Pts	Qualification
1st place, gold medalist(s)	Puerto Rico (H)	5	5	0	512	233	+279	10	2023 FIBA Under-16 Americas Championship
2nd place, silver medalist(s)	Dominican Republic	5	4	1	432	289	+143	9	2023 FIBA Under-16 Americas Championship
3rd place, bronze medalist(s)	Mexico	5	3	2	418	275	+143	8	2023 FIBA Under-16 Americas Championship
4	Bahamas	5	2	3	323	389	−66	7	
5	Turks and Caicos Islands	5	1	4	240	466	−226	6	
6	Costa Rica	5	0	5	240	513	−273	5	

Source: FIBA
(H) Hosts

== Match results ==
All times are local (Atlantic Standard Time – UTC-4).

18 June 2022
15:00

Boxscore

Costa Rica	61–67	Turks and Caicos Islands
Scoring by quarter: 21–18, 10–15, 20–12, 10–22

Coliseo Fernando Rube Hernandez, Gurabo

18 June 2022
17:45

Boxscore

Mexico	58–77	Dominican Republic
Scoring by quarter: 20–20, 16–19, 13–20, 9–18

Coliseo Fernando Rube Hernandez, Gurabo

18 June 2022
20:30

Boxscore

Puerto Rico	107–42	Bahamas
Scoring by quarter: 36–6, 31–17, 15–11, 25–8

Coliseo Fernando Rube Hernandez, Gurabo

19 June 2022
15:00

Boxscore

Turks and Caicos Islands	46–100	Dominican Republic
Scoring by quarter: 8–28, 15–25, 13–19, 10–28

Coliseo Fernando Rube Hernandez, Gurabo

19 June 2022
17:45

Boxscore

Mexico	99–49	Bahamas
Scoring by quarter: 29–16, 18–12, 23–10, 29–11

Coliseo Fernando Rube Hernandez, Gurabo

19 June 2022
20:30

Boxscore

Costa Rica	46–122	Puerto Rico
Scoring by quarter: 7–44, 4–18, 14–32, 21–28

Coliseo Fernando Rube Hernandez, Gurabo

20 June 2022
15:00

Boxscore

Dominican Republic	70–59	Bahamas
Scoring by quarter: 26–14, 13–9, 14–20, 17–16

Coliseo Fernando Rube Hernandez, Gurabo

20 June 2022
17:45

Boxscore

Mexico	109–38	Costa Rica
Scoring by quarter: 27–6, 31–7, 25–13, 26–12

Coliseo Fernando Rube Hernandez, Gurabo

20 June 2022
20:30

Boxscore

Turks and Caicos Islands	32–123	Puerto Rico
Scoring by quarter: 13–32, 8–26, 3–44, 8–21

Coliseo Fernando Rube Hernandez, Gurabo

21 June 2022
15:00

Boxscore

Bahamas	94–57	Costa Rica
Scoring by quarter: 18–11, 26–16, 24–18, 26–12

Coliseo Fernando Rube Hernandez, Gurabo

21 June 2022
17:45

Boxscore

Turks and Caicos Islands	39–103	Mexico
Scoring by quarter: 8–23, 11–33, 14–27, 6–20

Coliseo Fernando Rube Hernandez, Gurabo

21 June 2022
20:30

Boxscore

Puerto Rico	88–64	Dominican Republic
Scoring by quarter: 20–14, 26–9, 25–20, 17–21

Coliseo Fernando Rube Hernandez, Gurabo

22 June 2022
15:00

Boxscore

Bahamas	79–56	Turks and Caicos Islands
Scoring by quarter: 24–15, 12–12, 25–18, 18–11

Coliseo Fernando Rube Hernandez, Gurabo

22 June 2022
17:45

Boxscore

Dominican Republic	121–38	Costa Rica
Scoring by quarter: 26–8, 37–11, 33–7, 25–12

Coliseo Fernando Rube Hernandez, Gurabo

22 June 2022
20:30

Boxscore

Puerto Rico	72–49	Mexico
Scoring by quarter: 15–11, 18–17, 22–13, 17–8

Coliseo Fernando Rube Hernandez, Gurabo
