= 2025 FIBA U16 AmeriCup =

9th FIBA Under-16 Americas Basketball Championship

Tournament details
- Host country: Mexico
- City: Ciudad Juárez
- Dates: 2–8 June 2025
- Teams: 8 (from 1 confederation)
- Venue: 1 (in 1 host city)

Final positions
- Champions: United States (9th title)
- Runners-up: Canada
- Third place: Venezuela

Tournament statistics
- MVP: (United States) Nasir Anderson

Official website
- www.fiba.basketball

The 2025 FIBA U16 AmeriCup was the ninth edition of the Americas basketball championship for men's under-16 national teams. The tournament was played in Ciudad Juárez, Mexico, from 2 to 8 June 2025. The top four teams qualified for the 2026 FIBA Under-17 Basketball World Cup in Turkey.

The United States won their ninth consecutive title, after defeating Canada 108–71 in the final.

== Participating teams ==
- North America:
1. United States
2. Canada
- Central America and the Caribbean: (2024 FIBA U15 Centrobasket in Ciudad Juárez, Mexico, 4–8 December 2024)
1. Puerto Rico
2. Mexico
3. Dominican Republic
- South America: (2024 FIBA U15 South American Championship in Pasaje, Ecuador, 21–27 October 2024)
1. Venezuela
2. Brazil
3. Argentina

== Group phase ==
In this round, the teams were drawn into two groups of four. All teams advanced to the playoffs.

All times are local (Time in Mexico / Pacific Zone DST – UTC-6).

=== Group A ===
Pos	Team	Pld	W	L	PF	PA	PD	Pts
1	United States	3	3	0	358	160	+198	6
2	Dominican Republic	3	2	1	214	255	−41	5
3	Argentina	3	1	2	209	267	−58	4
4	Mexico (H)	3	0	3	170	269	−99	3

Source: FIBA
(H) Hosts

2 June 2025
17:30

Boxscore

Dominican Republic	91–76	Argentina
Scoring by quarter: 14–27, 29–22, 25–16, 23–11

Gimnasio Universitario UACJ, Ciudad Juárez

2 June 2025
20:00

Boxscore

Mexico	50–123	United States
Scoring by quarter: 13–23, 8–31, 19–35, 10–34

Gimnasio Universitario UACJ, Ciudad Juárez

3 June 2025
17:30

Boxscore

United States	111–54	Dominican Republic
Scoring by quarter: 32–8, 32–20, 18–13, 29–13

Gimnasio Universitario UACJ, Ciudad Juárez

3 June 2025
20:00

Boxscore

Argentina	77–52	Mexico
Scoring by quarter: 26–13, 20–10, 13–21, 18–8

Gimnasio Universitario UACJ, Ciudad Juárez

4 June 2025
17:30

Boxscore

Argentina	56–124	United States
Scoring by quarter: 17–38, 23–33, 11–24, 5–29

Gimnasio Universitario UACJ, Ciudad Juárez

4 June 2025
20:00

Boxscore

Mexico	68–69	Dominican Republic
Scoring by quarter: 17–9, 24–22, 9–12, 18–26

Gimnasio Universitario UACJ, Ciudad Juárez

=== Group B ===
Pos	Team	Pld	W	L	PF	PA	PD	Pts
1	Canada	3	3	0	271	216	+55	6
2	Puerto Rico	3	2	1	247	241	+6	5
3	Venezuela	3	1	2	204	201	+3	4
4	Brazil	3	0	3	220	284	−64	3

Source: FIBA

2 June 2025
12:30

Boxscore

Venezuela	62–66	Canada
Scoring by quarter: 8–12, 15–16, 21–17, 18–21

Gimnasio Universitario UACJ, Ciudad Juárez

2 June 2025
15:00

Boxscore

Brazil	80–98	Puerto Rico
Scoring by quarter: 15–24, 20–25, 20–23, 25–26

Gimnasio Universitario UACJ, Ciudad Juárez

3 June 2025
12:30

Boxscore

Puerto Rico	68–67	Venezuela
Scoring by quarter: 11–16, 25–12, 12–21, 20–18

Gimnasio Universitario UACJ, Ciudad Juárez

3 June 2025
15:00

Boxscore

Canada	111–73	Brazil
Scoring by quarter: 21–21, 38–18, 27–20, 25–14

Gimnasio Universitario UACJ, Ciudad Juárez

4 June 2025
12:30

Boxscore

Puerto Rico	81–94	Canada
Scoring by quarter: 18–27, 21–22, 27–19, 15–26

Gimnasio Universitario UACJ, Ciudad Juárez

4 June 2025
15:00

Boxscore

Venezuela	75–67	Brazil
Scoring by quarter: 22–23, 14–13, 13–10, 26–21

Gimnasio Universitario UACJ, Ciudad Juárez

== Playoffs ==
=== Bracket ===
5th place match
Brazil	91
Dominican Republic	86
7th place match
Argentina	65
Mexico	85

5th–8th place semifinals
Brazil	62
Argentina	60
Dominican Republic	79
Mexico	64

Quarterfinals
A1	United States	129
B4	Brazil	50
B2	Puerto Rico	89
A3	Argentina	79
A2	Dominican Republic	57
B3	Venezuela	71
B1	Canada	96
A4	Mexico	70

Semifinals
United States	106
Puerto Rico	68
Venezuela	65
Canada	78

Final
United States	108
Canada	71
3rd place match
Puerto Rico	76
Venezuela	84

=== Quarterfinals ===
6 June 2025
12:30

Boxscore

United States	129–50	Brazil
Scoring by quarter: 38–13, 42–13, 24–18, 25–6

Gimnasio Universitario UACJ, Ciudad Juárez

6 June 2025
15:00

Boxscore

Puerto Rico	89–79	Argentina
Scoring by quarter: 17–10, 23–21, 29–23, 20–25

Gimnasio Universitario UACJ, Ciudad Juárez

6 June 2025
17:30

Boxscore

Dominican Republic	57–71	Venezuela
Scoring by quarter: 15–20, 16–9, 11–21, 15–21

Gimnasio Universitario UACJ, Ciudad Juárez

6 June 2025
20:00

Boxscore

Canada	96–70	Mexico
Scoring by quarter: 35–23, 23–13, 19–17, 19–17

Gimnasio Universitario UACJ, Ciudad Juárez

=== 5th–8th place semifinals ===
7 June 2025
12:30

Boxscore

Brazil	62–60 (OT)	Argentina
Scoring by quarter: 18–15, 11–19, 12–11, 12–8, Overtime: 9-7

Gimnasio Universitario UACJ, Ciudad Juárez

7 June 2025
15:00

Boxscore

Dominican Republic	79–64	Mexico
Scoring by quarter: 17–26, 23–15, 22–9, 17–14

Gimnasio Universitario UACJ, Ciudad Juárez

=== 7th place match ===
8 June 2025
12:30

Boxscore

Argentina	65–85	Mexico
Scoring by quarter: 16–16, 12–21, 14–26, 23–22

Gimnasio Universitario UACJ, Ciudad Juárez

=== 5th place match ===
8 June 2025
15:00

Boxscore

Brazil	91–86	Dominican Republic
Scoring by quarter: 24–17, 20–20, 20–28, 27–21

Gimnasio Universitario UACJ, Ciudad Juárez

=== Semifinals ===
7 June 2025
17:30

Boxscore

United States	106–68	Puerto Rico
Scoring by quarter: 23–15, 29–18, 31–19, 23–16

Gimnasio Universitario UACJ, Ciudad Juárez

7 June 2025
20:00

Boxscore

Venezuela	65–78	Canada
Scoring by quarter: 19–19, 16–22, 21–25, 9–12

Gimnasio Universitario UACJ, Ciudad Juárez

=== 3rd place match ===
8 June 2025
17:30

Boxscore

Puerto Rico	76–84	Venezuela
Scoring by quarter: 12–19, 21–22, 15–23, 28–20

Gimnasio Universitario UACJ, Ciudad Juárez

=== Final ===
8 June 2025
20:00

Boxscore

United States	108–71	Canada
Scoring by quarter: 28–19, 32–16, 25–17, 23–19

Gimnasio Universitario UACJ, Ciudad Juárez

== Final standings ==
Rank	Team	Record
1st place, gold medalist(s)	United States	6–0
2nd place, silver medalist(s)	Canada	5–1
3rd place, bronze medalist(s)	Venezuela	3–3
4	Puerto Rico	3–3
5	Brazil	2–4
6	Dominican Republic	3–3
7	Mexico	1–5
8	Argentina	1–5

Qualified for the 2026 FIBA Under-17 Basketball World Cup

== Awards ==
2025 FIBA U16 AmeriCup champions

United States
Ninth title

The awards were announced on 9 June 2025.

=== Most Valuable Player ===
- (United States) Nasir Anderson

=== All-Star Five ===
- (United States) Nasir Anderson - Guard
- (Puerto Rico) Dwight Gaines - Guard
- (Venezuela) Julio Vásquez - Shooting guard
- (Canada) Isaiah Hamilton - Small forward
- (United States) Marcus Spears Jr. - Power forward
