= 2024 FIBA U15 Centrobasket =

International youth basketball tournament

Tournament details
- Host country: Mexico
- City: Ciudad Juárez
- Dates: 4–8 December 2024
- Teams: 7 (from 1 confederation)
- Venue: 1 (in 1 host city)

Final positions
- Champions: Puerto Rico (5th title)
- Runners-up: Mexico
- Third place: Dominican Republic

Official website
- www.fiba.basketball

The 2024 FIBA U15 Centrobasket was the seventh and the last edition of the Central American and Caribbean basketball championship for men's under-15 national teams. The tournament was played at Gimnasio Universitario UACJ in Ciudad Juárez, Mexico, from 4 to 8 December 2024.

== Participating teams ==
- Costa Rica
- Dominican Republic
- El Salvador
- Mexico
- Panama
- Puerto Rico
- Virgin Islands

== Group phase ==
In this round, the teams were drawn into two groups. The first two teams from each group advanced to the semifinals; the other teams advanced to the 5th–7th place playoffs.

All times are local (Pacific Zone – UTC-7).

=== Group A ===
| Pos | Team | Pld | W | L | PF | PA | PD | Pts | Qualification |
|---|---|---|---|---|---|---|---|---|---|
| 1 | Puerto Rico | 3 | 3 | 0 | 316 | 150 | +166 | 6 | Semifinals |
| 2 | Panama | 3 | 2 | 1 | 213 | 215 | −2 | 5 | Semifinals |
| 3 | Costa Rica | 3 | 1 | 2 | 187 | 225 | −38 | 4 | 5th–7th place playoffs |
| 4 | Virgin Islands | 3 | 0 | 3 | 175 | 301 | −126 | 3 | 5th–7th place playoffs |

Source: FIBA

4 December 2024
14:30

Boxscore

| Virgin Islands | 73–100 | Panama |
Scoring by quarter: 19–22, 22–27, 12–21, 20–30

Gimnasio Universitario UACJ, Ciudad Juárez

4 December 2024
17:00

Boxscore

| Puerto Rico | 102–58 | Costa Rica |
Scoring by quarter: 31–12, 18–13, 30–10, 23–23

Gimnasio Universitario UACJ, Ciudad Juárez

5 December 2024
14:30

Boxscore

| Costa Rica | 76–59 | Virgin Islands |
Scoring by quarter: 21–15, 20–15, 14–21, 21–8

Gimnasio Universitario UACJ, Ciudad Juárez

5 December 2024
17:00

Boxscore

| Panama | 49–89 | Puerto Rico |
Scoring by quarter: 15–31, 14–14, 11–30, 9–14

Gimnasio Universitario UACJ, Ciudad Juárez

6 December 2024
14:30

Boxscore

| Costa Rica | 53–64 | Panama |
Scoring by quarter: 8–23, 16–17, 16–11, 13–13

Gimnasio Universitario UACJ, Ciudad Juárez

6 December 2024
17:00

Boxscore

| Virgin Islands | 43–125 | Puerto Rico |
Scoring by quarter: 14–37, 10–30, 7–27, 12–31

Gimnasio Universitario UACJ, Ciudad Juárez

=== Group B ===
| Pos | Team | Pld | W | L | PF | PA | PD | Pts | Qualification |
|---|---|---|---|---|---|---|---|---|---|
| 1 | Mexico (H) | 2 | 2 | 0 | 221 | 135 | +86 | 4 | Semifinals |
| 2 | Dominican Republic | 2 | 1 | 1 | 222 | 135 | +87 | 3 | Semifinals |
| 3 | El Salvador | 2 | 0 | 2 | 89 | 262 | −173 | 2 | 5th–7th place playoffs |

Source: FIBA
(H) Hosts

4 December 2024
20:00

Boxscore

| Mexico | 129–46 | El Salvador |
Scoring by quarter: 31–4, 37–7, 34–14, 27–21

Gimnasio Universitario UACJ, Ciudad Juárez

5 December 2024
19:30

Boxscore

| El Salvador | 43–133 | Dominican Republic |
Scoring by quarter: 8–34, 23–31, 4–39, 8–29

Gimnasio Universitario UACJ, Ciudad Juárez

6 December 2024
19:30

Boxscore

| Dominican Republic | 89–92 | Mexico |
Scoring by quarter: 21–26, 28–26, 21–17, 19–23

Gimnasio Universitario UACJ, Ciudad Juárez

== 5th–7th place playoffs ==
| 5th–7th place semifinal | | | 5th place match |
| | | | A3 | Costa Rica | 70 |
| B3 | El Salvador | 75 | B3 | El Salvador | 59 |
| A4 | Virgin Islands | 72 |

=== 5th–7th place semifinal ===
7 December 2024
14:30

Boxscore

| El Salvador | 75–72 | Virgin Islands |
Scoring by quarter: 18–22, 18–22, 11–15, 28–13

Gimnasio Universitario UACJ, Ciudad Juárez

=== 5th place match ===
8 December 2024
13:00

Boxscore

| Costa Rica | 70–59 | El Salvador |
Scoring by quarter: 10–23, 20–0, 21–24, 19–12

Gimnasio Universitario UACJ, Ciudad Juárez

== Championship playoffs ==
Semifinals
A1 | Puerto Rico | 109
B2 | Dominican Republic | 87
B1 | Mexico | 81
A2 | Panama | 53

Final
A1 | Puerto Rico | 80
B1 | Mexico | 75
3rd place match
B2 | Dominican Republic | 88
A2 | Panama | 63

=== Semifinals ===
7 December 2024
17:00

Boxscore

| Puerto Rico | 109–87 | Dominican Republic |
Scoring by quarter: 25–18, 37–21, 25–26, 22–22

Gimnasio Universitario UACJ, Ciudad Juárez

7 December 2024
19:30

Boxscore

| Mexico | 81–53 | Panama |
Scoring by quarter: 26–12, 13–18, 17–16, 25–7

Gimnasio Universitario UACJ, Ciudad Juárez

=== 3rd place match ===
8 December 2024
15:30

Boxscore

| Dominican Republic | 88–63 | Panama |
Scoring by quarter: 34–17, 16–16, 19–11, 19–19

Gimnasio Universitario UACJ, Ciudad Juárez

=== Final ===
8 December 2024
18:00

Boxscore

| Puerto Rico | 80–75 | Mexico |
Scoring by quarter: 14–23, 20–21, 20–17, 26–14

Gimnasio Universitario UACJ, Ciudad Juárez

== Final standings ==
| Rank | Team |
|---|---|
| 1st place, gold medalist(s) | Puerto Rico |
| 2nd place, silver medalist(s) | Mexico |
| 3rd place, bronze medalist(s) | Dominican Republic |
| 4 | Panama |
| 5 | Costa Rica |
| 6 | El Salvador |
| 7 | Virgin Islands |

| Qualified for the 2025 FIBA U16 AmeriCup |
