= 2017 FIBA Under-16 Americas Championship =

5th FIBA Under-16 American Basketball Championship

Tournament details
- Host country: Argentina
- City: Formosa
- Dates: 14–18 June
- Teams: 8 (from 1 confederation)
- Venue(s): 1 (in 1 host city)

Final positions
- Champions: United States (5th title)
- Runners-up: Canada
- Third place: Puerto Rico

Tournament statistics
- MVP: (United States) Vernon Carey Jr.
- Top scorer: (Puerto Rico) Curbelo (21.8)
- Top rebounds: (Canada) Ndur (8.6)
- Top assists: (Puerto Rico) Curbelo (3.3)
- PPG (Team): United States (112.6)
- RPG (Team): Canada (48.4)
- APG (Team): United States (19.8)

Official website
- 2017 FIBA Americas U-16 Championship

The 2017 FIBA Under-16 Americas Championship was the men's international basketball competition that was held in Formosa, Argentina from 14–18 June 2017.

The United States successfully defended their title against Canada, 111–60, in the rematch of the Finals. Meanwhile, Puerto Rico upended the hosts Argentina in the bronze medal game, 78–67, to notch their first ever podium finish in the tournament.

Due to Argentina named as the hosts of the U17 World Cup next year, another slot was awarded to FIBA Americas, wherein Dominican Republic grabbed the fifth spot by subduing Mexico, 71–51.

The top four teams, excluding Argentina qualified for the 2018 FIBA Under-17 Basketball World Cup as host.

== Venue ==
Formosa	2017 FIBA Under-16 Americas Championship is located in Argentina
Estadio Polideportivo Cincuentenario	2017 FIBA Under-16 Americas Championship is located in Argentina
Capacity: 4,500	2017 FIBA Under-16 Americas Championship is located in Argentina

== Qualified teams ==
- Argentina
- Canada
- Dominican Republic
- Mexico
- Paraguay
- Puerto Rico
- United States
- Venezuela

== Group phase ==
A draw was held on 23 May 2017 in San Juan, Puerto Rico.

All times are local (UTC−3).

=== Group A ===
Pos	Team	Pld	W	L	PF	PA	PD	Pts	Qualification
1	Canada	3	3	0	234	175	+59	6	Advance to Semifinals
2	Argentina	3	2	1	178	166	+12	5	Advance to Semifinals
3	Paraguay	3	1	2	193	214	−21	4	Advance to Classification 5-8
4	Venezuela	3	0	3	146	196	−50	3	Advance to Classification 5-8

Source: FIBA

14 June 2017
14:00

Boxscore

Venezuela	64–70	Paraguay
Scoring by quarter: 15–14, 16–15, 14–15, 19–26
Pts: Díaz 15; Rebs: Marrero 15; Asts: Meneses 11		Pts: Blaich 16; Rebs: Barreto 16; Asts: Ruiz 12

Estadio Polideportivo Cincuentenario, Formosa
Referees: Gonzalo Salgueiro (URU), Vivian Garcia (URU), Jonathan Sterling (USA)

14 June 2017
21:00

Boxscore

Canada	75–61	Argentina
Scoring by quarter: 22–12, 21–14, 12–14, 20–21
Pts: McNeilly 22; Rebs: Ndur 9 Asts: Rathan-Mayes 2		Pts: Bertona 21; Rebs: Chapero 7 Asts: Bertona 3

Estadio Polideportivo Cincuentenario, Formosa
Referees: Jesed Diaz (PUR), Omar Bermudez (MEX), Natalia Cuello (DOM)

15 June 2017
16:30

Boxscore

Paraguay	71–79	Canada
Scoring by quarter: 12–21, 14–19, 25–20, 20–19
Pts: Galarza 12; Rebs: Galarza 7 Asts: Galarza 4		Pts: Rathan-Mayes 21; Rebs: Ndur 10; Asts: McNeilly 3

Estadio Polideportivo Cincuentenario, Formosa
Referees: Jesed Diaz (PUR), Omar Bermudez (MEX), Jonathan Sterling (USA)

15 June 2017
21:00

Boxscore

Argentina	46–39	Venezuela
Scoring by quarter: 16–11, 8–6, 12–12, 10–10
Pts: Bertona 15; Rebs: Bertona 7 Asts: Bertona 2		Pts: Alcala 11; Rebs: Alcala 15; Asts: Meneses 1

Estadio Polideportivo Cincuentenario, Formosa
Referees: Natalia Cuello (DOM), Sebastian Negron (CHI), Gonzalo Salgueiro (URU)

16 June 2017
18:45

Boxscore

Canada	80–43	Venezuela
Scoring by quarter: 23–7, 18–12, 22–15, 17–9
Pts: Todd 13; Rebs: Nwagha 7 Asts: Sakota 5		Pts: Marrero 12; Rebs: Sánchez 6 Asts: four players 1

Estadio Polideportivo Cincuentenario, Formosa
Referees: Jonathan Sterling (USA), Omar Bermudez (MEX), Natalia Cuello (DOM)

16 June 2017
21:00

Boxscore

Paraguay	52–71	Argentina
Scoring by quarter: 18–11, 12–13, 12–21, 10–26
Pts: Barreto 20; Rebs: Aguero 8 Asts: Barreto 3		Pts: Lugarini 17; Rebs: Lugarini 13; Asts: Pividori 5

Estadio Polideportivo Cincuentenario, Formosa
Referees: Jesed Diaz (PUR), Carlos Peralta (COL), Gonzalo Salgueiro (URU)

=== Group B ===
Pos	Team	Pld	W	L	PF	PA	PD	Pts	Qualification
1	United States	3	3	0	331	166	+165	6	Advance to Semifinals
2	Puerto Rico	3	2	1	244	266	−22	5	Advance to Semifinals
3	Dominican Republic	3	1	2	219	233	−14	4	Advance to Classification 5-8
4	Mexico	3	0	3	165	294	−129	3	Advance to Classification 5-8

Source: FIBA

14 June 2017
16:15

Boxscore

United States	110–69	Puerto Rico
Scoring by quarter: 24–11, 24–24, 31–18, 31–16
Pts: Carey Jr. 17; Rebs: Carey Jr. 9 Asts: Hampton, Weems 4		Pts: Rolón 18; Rebs: González, Pinzón 4 Asts: Rolón 4

Estadio Polideportivo Cincuentenario, Formosa
Referees: Daniel García (VEN), Carlos Peralta (ECU), Micaela Ayelen Prado (ARG)

14 June 2017
18:30

Boxscore

Mexico	45–86	Dominican Republic
Scoring by quarter: 9–28, 14–19, 7–19, 15–20
Pts: Cruz 12; Rebs: Lucero 10; Asts: Noriega 4		Pts: Jones 22; Rebs: Bastianoni 13; Asts: Montero 3

Estadio Polideportivo Cincuentenario, Formosa
Referees: Sebastian Negron (CHI), Virginia Peruchini (ARG), Michael Scott (CAN)

15 June 2017
14:15

Boxscore

Puerto Rico	81–68	Mexico
Scoring by quarter: 21–18, 21–13, 20–14, 19–23
Pts: Rosa 14; Rebs: Curbelo 10; Asts: Curbelo 3		Pts: Cruz 18; Rebs: Díaz 6 Asts: Avelino 4

Estadio Polideportivo Cincuentenario, Formosa
Referees: Daniel Garcia (VEN), Vivian Elizabeth Garcia Otermin (URU), Virginia Soledad Peruchini (ARG)

15 June 2017
18:45

Boxscore

Dominican Republic	45–94	United States
Scoring by quarter: 13–19, 9–27, 9–21, 14–27
Pts: De La Rosa 15; Rebs: Edouard 7 Asts: Mejia 2		Pts: Wiseman 15; Rebs: Wiseman 10; Asts: Roach 5

Estadio Polideportivo Cincuentenario, Formosa
Referees: Carlos Peralta (ECU), Micaela Ayelen Prado (ARG), Michael Scott (CAN)

16 June 2017
14:15

Boxscore

United States	127–52	Mexico
Scoring by quarter: 30–15, 40–5, 31–23, 26–9
Pts: Z. Harmon 17; Rebs: Weems 11; Asts: Z. Harmon 5		Pts: Cruz 20; Rebs: López 5 Asts: Cruz 4

Estadio Polideportivo Cincuentenario, Formosa
Referees: Sebastian Negron (CHI), Vivian Garcia (URU), Michael Scott (CAN)

16 June 2017
16:30

Boxscore

Dominican Republic	88–94	Puerto Rico
Scoring by quarter: 23–18, 17–25, 22–26, 26–25
Pts: Jones 34; Rebs: Jones 10; Asts: Jones 6		Pts: Curbelo 26; Rebs: Sosa 14; Asts: Curbelo 5

Estadio Polideportivo Cincuentenario, Formosa
Referees: Daniel Garcia (VEN), Virginia Peruchini (ARG), Micaela Prado (ARG)

== Classification round ==
All times are local (UTC-3).

5th–8th
17 June
Paraguay	60
Mexico	71
17 June
Dominican Republic	71
Venezuela	57

Fifth place
18 June
Mexico	51
Dominican Republic	71
Seventh place
18 June
Paraguay	49
Venezuela	53

=== Classification 5–8 ===
17 June 2017
14:15

Boxscore

Dominican Republic	71–57	Venezuela
Scoring by quarter: 14–11, 17–7, 10–16, 30–23
Pts: Jones 14; Rebs: Bastianoni 6 Asts: Jones 3		Pts: Alcala 15; Rebs: Alcala 7 Asts: Marrero 3

Estadio Polideportivo Cincuentenario, Formosa
Referees: Jesed Diaz (PUR), Vivian Garcia (URU), Micaela Prado (URU)

17 June 2017
16:30

Boxscore

Paraguay	60–71	Mexico
Scoring by quarter: 16–13, 9–18, 18–15, 17–25
Pts: Ruiz 13; Rebs: Barreto 8 Asts: Barreto 3		Pts: Avelino 19; Rebs: Cruz 7 Asts: Morales 5

Estadio Polideportivo Cincuentenario, Formosa
Referees: Jonathan Sterling (USA), Virginia Peruchini (ARG), Michael Scott (CAN)

=== Seventh place game ===
18 June 2017
14:15

Boxscore

Paraguay	49–53	Venezuela
Scoring by quarter: 11–6, 17–15, 17–16, 4–16
Pts: Barreto 20; Rebs: Aguero 9 Asts: Mercado 4		Pts: Alcala 18; Rebs: Alcala 10; Asts: Diaz 3

Estadio Polideportivo Cincuentenario, Formosa
Referees: Natalia Cuello (DOM), Vivian Garcia (URU), Virginia Peruchini (ARG)

=== Fifth place game ===
18 June 2017
16:30

Boxscore

Mexico	51–71	Dominican Republic
Scoring by quarter: 8–19, 16–18, 12–17, 15–17
Pts: Cruz 17; Rebs: Dennis 11; Asts: Avelino 4		Pts: Jones 22; Rebs: Bastianoni 11; Asts: Rodriguez 4

Estadio Polideportivo Cincuentenario, Formosa
Referees: Jesed Diaz (PUR), Gonzalo Salgueiro (URU), Jonathan Sterling (USA)

== Final round ==
All times are local (UTC-3).

Semifinals
17 June
Canada	81
Puerto Rico	66
17 June
United States	121
Argentina	49

Final
18 June
Canada	60
United States	111
Third place
18 June
Puerto Rico	78
Argentina	67

=== Semifinals ===
17 June 2017
18:45

Boxscore

Canada	81–66	Puerto Rico
Scoring by quarter: 17–12, 29–17, 18–21, 17–16
Pts: McNeilly 23; Rebs: Ndur 12; Asts: five players 2		Pts: Curbelo 27; Rebs: Curbelo 9 Asts: three players 2

Estadio Polideportivo Cincuentenario, Formosa
Referees: Daniel Garcia (VEN), Omar Bermudez (MEX), Natalia Cuello (DOM)

17 June 2017
21:00

Boxscore

United States	121–49	Argentina
Scoring by quarter: 30–9, 41–12, 18–11, 32–17
Pts: Barnes 20; Rebs: Todd 9 Asts: D. Harmon 4		Pts: Lugarini 15; Rebs: Von Schmeling 4 Asts: Bertona 3

Estadio Polideportivo Cincuentenario, Formosa
Referees: Carlos Peralta (ECU), Sebastian Negron (CHI), Gonzalo Salgueiro (URU)

=== Third place game ===
18 June 2017
18:45

Boxscore

Puerto Rico	78–67	Argentina
Scoring by quarter: 26–16, 18–12, 18–22, 16–17
Pts: Curbelo 23; Rebs: Sosa 19; Asts: Rolón 8		Pts: Lugarini 18; Rebs: Gallardo 9 Asts: Lugarini, Pividori 4

Estadio Polideportivo Cincuentenario, Formosa
Referees: Sebastian Negron (CHI), Omar Bermudez (MEX), Michael Scott (CAN)

=== Final ===
18 June 2017
21:00

Boxscore

Canada	60–111	United States
Scoring by quarter: 16–26, 8–23, 12–33, 24–29
Pts: Sakota 17; Rebs: Ndur 8 Asts: Rathan-Mayes 4		Pts: Carey Jr. 19; Rebs: Weems 8 Asts: Z. Harmon 6

Estadio Polideportivo Cincuentenario, Formosa
Referees: Daniel Garcia (VEN), Carlos Peralta (ECU), Micaela Prado (URU)

== Awards ==
2017 FIBA Under-16 Americas
Championship winners

United States
5th title

Most Valuable Player
(United States) Vernon Carey Jr.

== Final ranking ==
Qualified for the 2018 FIBA Under-17 Basketball World Cup.
Qualified for the 2018 FIBA Under-17 Basketball World Cup as the hosts.

Rank	Team	Record
1st place, gold medalist(s)	United States	5–0
2nd place, silver medalist(s)	Canada	4–1
3rd place, bronze medalist(s)	Puerto Rico	3–2
4	Argentina	2–3
5	Dominican Republic	3–2
6	Mexico	1–4
7	Venezuela	1–4
8	Paraguay	1–4
