= Darryl Morsell =

American basketball player (born 1999)

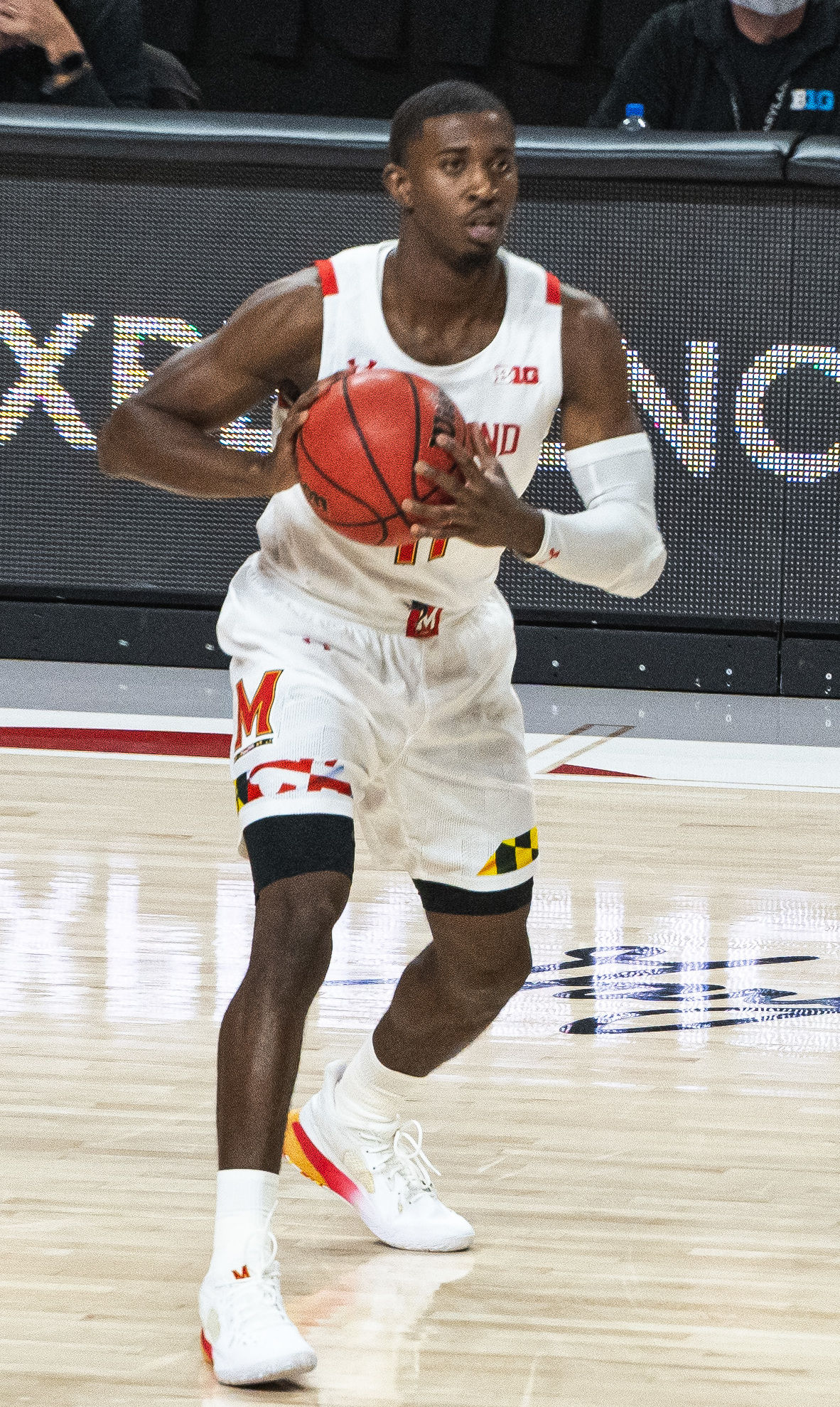
- Morsell with Maryland in 2020

Free agent
- Position: Shooting guard

Personal information
- Born: February 18, 1999 (age 27) Baltimore, Maryland, U.S.
- Listed height: 6 ft 5 in (1.96 m)
- Listed weight: 200 lb (91 kg)

Career information
- High school: Mount Saint Joseph (Baltimore, Maryland)
- College: Maryland (2017–2021); Marquette (2021–2022)
- NBA draft: 2022: undrafted
- Playing career: 2022–present

Career history
- 2022: Salt Lake City Stars
- 2022–2024: Raptors 905
- 2024: Mets de Guaynabo
- 2024: Ironi Kiryat Ata
- 2025: Peja
- 2025: Keflavík
- 2026: ÍA

Career highlights
- Big Ten Defensive Player of the Year (2021); Big Ten All-Defensive Team (2021)
- Stats at NBA.com
- Stats at Basketball Reference

Darryl Morsell (born February 18, 1999) is an American professional basketball. He played college basketball for the Maryland Terrapins and the Marquette Golden Eagles.

== High school career ==
Morsell attended Mount Saint Joseph High School in Baltimore, Maryland, where he played basketball with his future college teammate Jalen Smith. As a junior, he averaged 10.6 points and 5.1 rebounds per game. In his senior season, he led his team to Baltimore Catholic League and Maryland Interscholastic Athletic Association A Conference titles. A consensus four-star recruit, he committed to playing college basketball for Maryland over an offer from Notre Dame.

== College career ==
As a freshman at Maryland, Morsell averaged 8.7 points, 4.4 rebounds and two assists per game. He averaged 8.5 points and 3.1 rebounds per game in his sophomore season. As a junior, Morsell averaged 8.5 points, 4.7 rebounds and 2.1 assists per game, helping Maryland win a share of the Big Ten regular season title. He was selected to the All-Big Ten honorable mention by the media. In January 2021, Morsell was sidelined for one week with a facial fracture that required surgery. On January 10, 2021, he scored a season-high 19 points in a 66–63 upset win over 12th-ranked Illinois. As a senior, Morsell averaged nine points, four rebounds and 2.8 assists per game. He was named Big Ten Defensive Player of the Year and collected All-Big Ten honorable mention from the media for a second straight year. On April 5, 2021, Morsell declared for the 2021 NBA draft while maintaining his college eligibility and entered the transfer portal.

On June 28, 2021, Morsell transferred to Marquette. On November 12, he scored a career-high 26 points in a 75–70 victory over New Hampshire. Morsell was an Honorable Mention All-Big East selection.

== Professional career ==
=== Salt Lake City Stars (2022) ===
On October 23, 2022, Morsell joined the Salt Lake City Stars training camp roster.

=== Raptors 905 (2022–2024) ===
On December 15, 2022, Morsell was traded to Raptors 905.

On September 29, 2023, Morsell signed with the Toronto Raptors, but was waived that day. On October 30, Morsell rejoined Raptors 905.

=== Mets de Guaynabo (2024) ===
On April 18, 2024, Morsell signed with the Mets de Guaynabo of the Baloncesto Superior Nacional.

=== Ironi Kiryat Ata (2024) ===
On August 31, 2024, Morsell signed with Ironi Kiryat Ata of the Ligat Winner Sal.

Morsell played for Peja in the first half of 2025. He started the following season with Keflavík in Iceland but left the team in end of December after averaging 17.6 points in 11 games. However, he stayed in the Úrvalsdeild and signed with ÍA in January.

== Career statistics ==
Legend
GP	Games played	GS	Games started	MPG	Minutes per game
FG%	Field goal percentage	3P%	3-point field goal percentage	FT%	Free throw percentage
RPG	Rebounds per game	APG	Assists per game	SPG	Steals per game
BPG	Blocks per game	PPG	Points per game	**Bold**	Career high

=== College ===
Year	Team	GP	GS	MPG	FG%	3P%	FT%	RPG	APG	SPG	BPG	PPG
2017–18	Maryland	32	21	28.8	.424	.120	.727	4.4	2.0	.6	.5	8.7
2018–19	Maryland	**33**	**31**	26.7	.459	.290	.672	3.1	1.8	.7	.5	8.5
2019–20	Maryland	31	29	27.6	.431	.333	.756	**4.7**	2.1	.8	.3	8.5
2020–21	Maryland	30	27	29.4	**.486**	.255	.609	4.0	**2.8**	.9	**.6**	9.0
2021–22	Marquette	31	31	**29.7**	.446	**.347**	**.771**	4.0	2.5	**1.2**	.4	**13.4**
Career		157	139	28.4	.449	.299	.717	4.0	2.2	.8	.4	9.6

== Personal life ==
Morsell is the son of Duane and Carolyn Morsell. His older brother, Terrell, died at age 10, two weeks after collapsing during a basketball scrimmage due to a heart issue. Morsell subsequently underwent surgery for a less severe heart issue.
