= Bahamas men's national under-15 and under-16 basketball team =

Bahamas
- FIBA zone: FIBA Americas
- National federation: Bahamas Basketball Federation

U17 World Cup
- Appearances: None

U16 AmeriCup
- Appearances: 2
- Medals: None

U15 Centrobasket
- Appearances: 3
- Medals: (bronze) Bronze: 1 (2012)

The Bahamas men's national under-15 and under-16 basketball team is a national basketball team of The Bahamas, administered by the Bahamas Basketball Federation. It represents the country in international under-15 and under-16 basketball competitions.

== FIBA U15 Centrobasket participations ==
| Year | Result |
|---|---|
| 2012 | 3rd place, bronze medalist(s) |
| 2014 | 6th |
| 2022 | 4th |

== FIBA Under-16 AmeriCup participations ==
| Year | Result |
|---|---|
| 2009 | 7th |
| 2013 | 7th |

== See also ==
- Bahamas men's national basketball team
- Bahamas men's national under-17 and under-18 basketball team
- Bahamas women's national under-15 basketball team
