= Estadio Osvaldo Casanova =

Sports arena in Buenos Aires, Argentina

Osvaldo Casanova Arena
- Estadio Osvaldo Casanova
- La Catedral
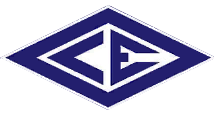

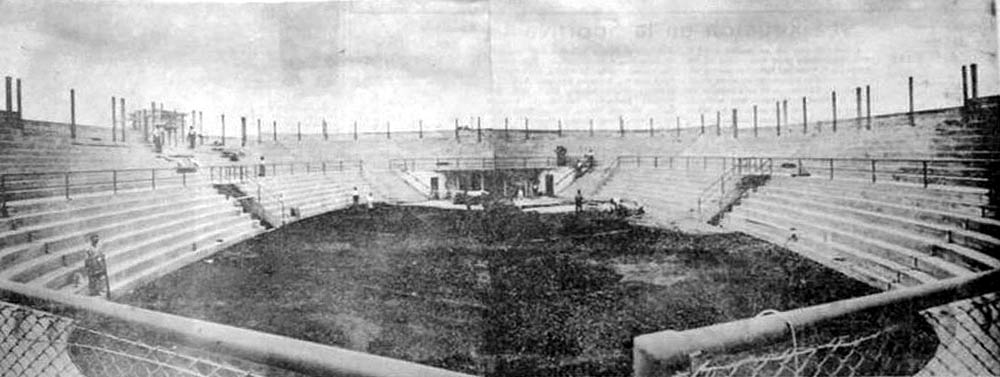
- The stadium in 1939 before its inauguration
- Interactive map of Osvaldo Casanova Arena
- Location: Santa Fe 51, Bahía Blanca, Argentina
- Operator: Club Estudiantes (BB)
- Capacity: 3,950
- Type: Arena
- Surface: Parquet

Construction
- Groundbreaking: 1928
- Opened: January 28, 1939; 87 years ago
- Renovated: 1958–1959, 1967, 2010–2011, 2014
- Architect: Manuel Mayer Méndez

Tenant
- Estudiantes (BB)

Estadio Osvaldo Casanova, nicknamed La Catedral, is an arena located in the city of Bahía Blanca in the Buenos Aires Province of Argentina. Owned and operated by local club Estudiantes, the arena is mainly used to host basketball and volleyball games. Its seating capacity is 3,950.

The stadium was named after Osvaldo Casanova, president of the club for several periods between 1938 and 1951. Casanova was the main promoter of the creation of the arena, which was finally opened in 1939 with a match between Estudiantes and River Plate.

== Overview ==
Formerly named "Juan Domingo Perón", it was renamed to honour the former club's president in 1959. In 1959, a roof was added to the stadium, covering 1,800 m2. Therefore, the venue became the first indoor arena in the city. In 1967 the stadium inaugurated a parquet surface.

In 1994, Magic Johnson played an exhibition match at Osvaldo Casanova Arena which hosted the game between Johnston's "All Star" and Estudiantes. After the game, Magic gave former Estudiantes legend Alberto Cabrera a plaque in commemoration of the 10th. anniversary of his retirement. The match was part of Johnson's visit to Argentina.

Over the years, the arena has undergone several renovations.

== Events ==
The arena hosted the 2011 FIVB Volleyball Boys' U19 World Championship, the 2015 FIBA Americas Under-16 Championship, and the 2017 FIBA AmeriCup.
