= Americas Rugby Challenge =

International rugby tournament

- Current season or competition: 2019 Americas Rugby Challenge
- Sport: Rugby union
- Instituted: 2018
- Number of teams: 4
- Country: Cayman Islands; Colombia; Mexico; Paraguay
- Holders: Colombia (2019)
- Most titles: Colombia (2 titles)

The Americas Rugby Challenge is an annual international rugby union tournament between the four best nations below the Americas Rugby Championship. It was created by Rugby Americas and features two teams from Sudamérica Rugby and two from Rugby Americas North. It was first contested in 2018, with Colombia winning the inaugural title.

== Format ==
All four nations play each other once in a single-round robin. Every instance of the tournament to date has taken place in one host country, unlike the Americas Rugby Championship in which each country hosts two to three home matches.

== Promotion/Relegation ==
In August of 2019, Chilean Rugby Federation president Cristian Rudhoff confirmed that starting in 2020 the Americas Rugby Challenge will include a promotion/relegation playoff with the Americas Rugby Championship

Additionally, the lower placed North American team in the Americas Rugby Challenge every year faces the winner of the Rugby Americas North Championship in a promotion/relegation playoff.

== Teams ==
=== Current Teams ===
- Colombia
- Paraguay
- Mexico
- Cayman Islands

=== Past Teams ===
- Guyana (2018)

== Previous Results ==
Year	Winner	Second	Third	Fourth
2018	Colombia	Paraguay	Mexico	Guyana
2019	Colombia	Mexico	Paraguay	Cayman Islands
2020	Cancelled due to COVID-19 pandemic			
