= Mexico men's national under-15 and under-16 basketball team =

Mexico
- FIBA zone: FIBA Americas
- National federation: Asociación Deportiva Mexicana de Básquetbol

U17 World Cup
- Appearances: None

U16 AmeriCup
- Appearances: 9
- Medals: None

U15 Centrobasket
- Appearances: 7
- Medals: (gold) Gold: 1 (2014); (silver) Silver: 4 (2011, 2012, 2018, 2024); (bronze) Bronze: 2 (2016, 2022)
Home	Away

The Mexico men's national under-15 and under-16 basketball team is a national basketball team of Mexico, administered by the Asociación Deportiva Mexicana de Básquetbol ADEMEBA (Mexican Basketball Association). It represents the country in international under-15 and under-16 basketball competitions.

== FIBA U15 Centrobasket participations ==
Year	Result
2011	2nd place, silver medalist(s)
2012	2nd place, silver medalist(s)
2014	1st place, gold medalist(s)
2016	3rd place, bronze medalist(s)
2018	2nd place, silver medalist(s)
2022	3rd place, bronze medalist(s)
2024	2nd place, silver medalist(s)

== FIBA Under-16 AmeriCup participations ==
Year	Result
2009	8th
2011	7th
2013	8th
2015	8th
2017	6th
2019	7th
2021	6th
2023	7th
2025	7th

== History ==
Mexico's U15 team of the Mexican School Sports Federation won the Gold Medal in the International School Sport Federation by defeating the host Serbia 69–52. Mexico defeated all the rivals it faced in the ISF (International School Sport Federation) Tournament. Mexico defeated North Macedonia 72–47, Serbia 76–57, France 71–47, and Serbia again in the Championship Game 69–52 to become the ISF Basketball World Champions.

== See also ==
- Mexico men's national basketball team
- Mexico men's national under-17 and under-18 basketball team
- Mexico women's national under-17 basketball team
- Mexico men's national 3x3 team
