= FIBA U15 Centrobasket =

International youth basketball tournament

- Most recent season or competition: 2024 FIBA U15 Centrobasket
- Sport: Basketball
- Founded: 2011
- Organizing body: FIBA Americas
- No. of teams: 8 max.
- Continent: Central America and the Caribbean
- Most recent champion: Puerto Rico (5th title)
- Most titles: Puerto Rico (5 titles)
- Qualification: FIBA Under-16 AmeriCup
- Related competitions: FIBA U17 Centrobasket
- Website: www.fiba.basketball/history

The FIBA U15 Centrobasket is an under-15 boys' basketball tournament held about every two years among 31 countries of Central America and the Caribbean and is organized in part by FIBA Americas. The tournament serves as a gateway to the FIBA Under-16 AmeriCup.

== Summary ==
Year	Host	Gold	Silver	Bronze
2011	Mexico (Mexico City)	Puerto Rico	Mexico	Costa Rica
2012	El Salvador (San Salvador)	Puerto Rico	Mexico	Bahamas
2014	Panama (Panama City)	Mexico	Puerto Rico	Dominican Republic
2016	Puerto Rico (Patillas)	Puerto Rico	Dominican Republic	Mexico
2018	Mexico (Hermosillo)	Dominican Republic	Mexico	Puerto Rico
2022	Puerto Rico (Gurabo)	Puerto Rico	Dominican Republic	Mexico
2024	Mexico (Ciudad Juárez)	Puerto Rico	Mexico	Dominican Republic

== Medal table ==
Rank	Nation	Gold	Silver	Bronze	Total
1	Puerto Rico	5	1	1	7
2	Mexico	1	4	2	7
3	Dominican Republic	1	2	2	5
4	Bahamas	0	0	1	1
4	Costa Rica	0	0	1	1
Totals (5 entries)		7	7	7	21

== Participation details ==
Team	(Mexico); 2011	(El Salvador); 2012	(Panama); 2014	(Puerto Rico); 2016	(Mexico); 2018	(Puerto Rico); 2022	(Mexico); 2024
Bahamas	—	3rd	6th	—	—	4th	—
Barbados	—	7th	—	—	—	—	—
Belize	4th	—	—	—	—	—	—
Cayman Islands	—	8th	—	—	—	—	—
Costa Rica	3rd	6th	7th	5th	5th	6th	5th
Dominican Republic	—	—	3rd	2nd	1st	2nd	3rd
El Salvador	5th	5th	—	—	—	—	6th
Guatemala	6th	4th	8th	—	—	—	—
Guyana	—	—	—	7th	—	—	—
Mexico	2nd	2nd	1st	3rd	2nd	3rd	2nd
Panama	—	—	4th	4th	4th	—	4th
Puerto Rico	1st	1st	2nd	1st	3rd	1st	1st
Trinidad and Tobago	—	—	—	6th	—	—	—
Turks and Caicos Islands	—	—	—	—	—	5th	—
Virgin Islands	—	—	5th	—	—	—	7th
