= Panama men's national under-15 basketball team =

Panama
- FIBA zone: FIBA Americas
- National federation: Basketball Federation of Panama

U17 World Cup
- Appearances: None

U16 AmeriCup
- Appearances: None

U15 Centrobasket
- Appearances: 4
- Medals: None

The Panama men's national under-15 basketball team is a national basketball team of Panama, administered by the Basketball Federation of Panama. It represents the country in men's international under-15 basketball competitions.

== FIBA U15 Centrobasket participations ==
Year	Result
2014	4th
2016	4th
2018	4th
2024	4th

== See also ==
- Panama men's national basketball team
- Panama men's national under-19 basketball team
- Panama women's national under-15 and under-16 basketball team
