= Club Alianza Viedma =

Deportivo Viedma
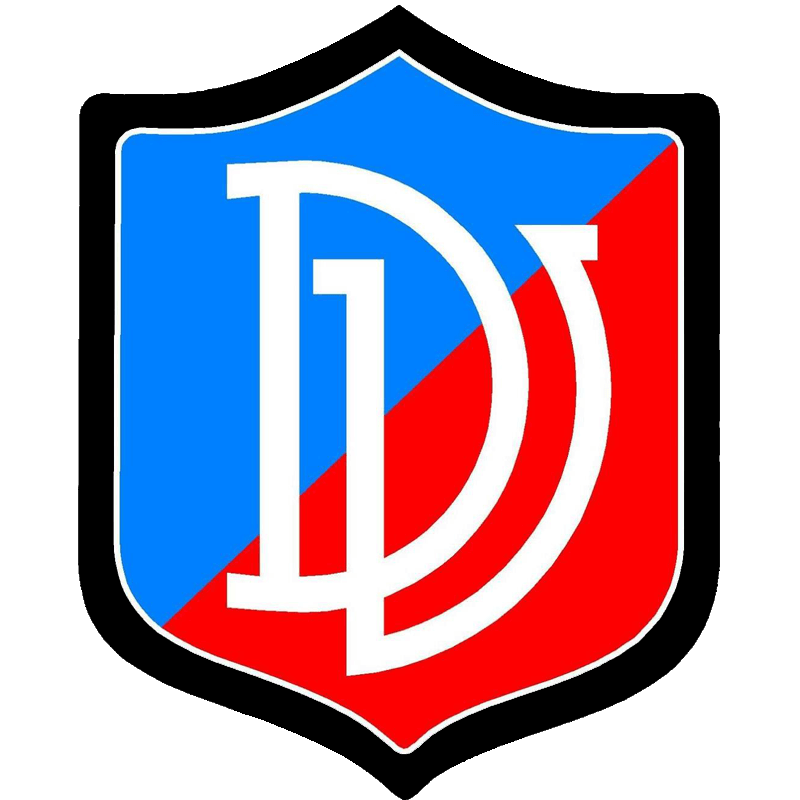
- Nickname: Depo
- Leagues: Liga Argentina
- Founded: 11 September 2009; 17 years ago
- Arena: Angel Arias
- Location: Viedma, Río Negro, Argentina
- President: Fernando Viola
- Head coach: Alejandro Lotterio
Home	Away

Deportivo Viedma (formerly, Club Alianza Viedma or Ceferino Alianza Viedma for sponsorship reasons), is an Argentine basketball club from the city of Viedma, Río Negro. One of the newest clubs in Argentina, it was founded in 2009 and the team currently plays at the Torneo Nacional de Ascenso, the second division of Argentine basketball league system.

== History ==
In 2009, "Club San Martín", promoted to Liga B, the third division of Argentine basketball. Due to its financial problems to solve the costs for taking part in a senior league, San Martín decided to merge with other two clubs from the city of Viedma, Villa Congreso and Sol de Mayo. The new institution was named "Alianza Viedma" to symbolize the allianz of three clubs.

Just two year after its establishment, Alianza promoted to Torneo Nacional de Ascenso, the second division of Argentine basketball. The club affiliated to Asociación de Básquet Valle Inferior and Federación Rionegrina de Básquet, with the purpose of registering its name officially.

During the 2011–12 season, Alianza reached the semi-finals, where they lost to Argentino de Junín in the 5th. game after two wins for each squad. The team made a great campaign playing at its home venue, where remained unbeaten for 19 consecutive fixtures.

Due to a sponsorship deal, the club changed its name to "Ceferino Alianza Viedma" in July 2012.

== Players ==
=== Current roster ===
Deportivo Viedma roster
Players
Coaches

Pos.	No.	Nat.	Name	Ht.	Age
PF	6	(Argentina)	Barrios, Pablo	5.8 ft 0 in (1.77 m)	49 – 14 April 1977
PF	8	(Argentina)	Barreto, Facundo	6.06 ft 0 in (1.85 m)	34 – 21 July 1992
PF	11	(Argentina)	Aguirrezabala, Martín	6.2 ft 0 in (1.89 m)	45 – 17 December 1980
PF	5	(United States)	Cutley, Scott	6.4 ft 0 in (1.95 m)	41 – 6 June 1985
PG	2	(Argentina)	Etchepare, Hernán	6.1 ft 0 in (1.86 m)	40 – 21 May 1986
PG	3	(Argentina)	Percaz, Martín	5.9 ft 0 in (1.80 m)	33 – 16 March 1993
SG	21	(Argentina)	Capponi, Febo	6.2 ft 0 in (1.89 m)	32 – 18 October 1994
SG	10	(Argentina)	Argello, Gabriel	6.2 ft 0 in (1.89 m)	32 – 3 January 1994
SG	12	(Argentina)	Ghirardi, Martín	6.463 ft 0 in (1.97 m)	44 – 21 May 1982
C	14	(Argentina)	Brizuela, Facundo	6.6 ft 0 in (2.01 m)	36 – 13 January 1990

Head coach

- (Argentina) Guillermo Bogliachino

Assistant coach(es)

- (Argentina) Jorge Luis Baldizzone
- (Argentina) Martin Escher

Legend

- (C) Team captain
- Injured

- Roster
Updated: 2013-01-03

=== Notable former players ===
- (Argentina) Sebastian Acosta
- (Cameroon) Gaston Essengue
