= Costa Rica men's national under-15 and under-16 basketball team =

Costa Rica
- FIBA zone: FIBA Americas
- National federation: Federación Costarricense de Baloncesto Aficionado

U17 World Cup
- Appearances: None

U16 AmeriCup
- Appearances: 1
- Medals: None

U15 Centrobasket
- Appearances: 7
- Medals: (bronze) Bronze: 1 (2011)

The Costa Rica men's national under-15 and under-16 basketball team is a national basketball team of Costa Rica, administered by the Federación Costarricense de Baloncesto Aficionado. It represents the country in international under-15 and under-16 basketball competitions.

== FIBA U15 Centrobasket participations ==
Year	Result
2011	3rd place, bronze medalist(s)
2012	6th
2014	7th
2016	5th
2018	5th
2022	6th
2024	5th

== FIBA Under-16 AmeriCup participations ==
Year	Result
2011	8th

== See also ==
- Costa Rica men's national basketball team
- Costa Rica men's national under-17 and under-18 basketball team
- Costa Rica women's national under-15 and under-16 basketball team
