= Puerto Rico men's national under-17 basketball team =

Puerto Rico
- FIBA zone: FIBA Americas
- National federation: Puerto Rican Basketball Federation
- Coach: Orlando Pantoja

U17 World Cup
- Appearances: 4
- Medals: (bronze) Bronze: (2018)

U16 AmeriCup
- Appearances: 9
- Medals: (bronze) Bronze: (2017, 2023)

U15 Centrobasket
- Appearances: 7
- Medals: (gold) Gold: (2011, 2012, 2016, 2022, 2024); (silver) Silver: (2014); (bronze) Bronze: (2018)
Medal record
FIBA Under-17 World Cup
Bronze medal – third place	2018 Argentina
FIBA Under-16 AmeriCup
Bronze medal – third place	2017 Argentina
Bronze medal – third place	2023 Mexico

The Puerto Rico men's national under-15, under-16 and under-17 basketball team is a national basketball team of Puerto Rico, administered by the Puerto Rican Basketball Federation. It represents the country in international under-15, under-16 and under-17 basketball competitions.

== Tournament record ==
=== FIBA Under-17 World Cup ===
Year	Pos.	Pld	W	L
(Germany) 2010	Did not qualify			
(Lithuania) 2012	Did not qualify			
(United Arab Emirates) 2014	5th	7	6	1
(Spain) 2016	Did not qualify			
(Argentina) 2018	3rd place, bronze medalist(s)	7	5	2
(Spain) 2022	Did not qualify			
(Turkey) 2024	6th	7	3	4
(Turkey) 2026	8th	7	3	4
(Greece) 2028	To be determined			
Total	4/9	28	17	11

=== FIBA Under-16 AmeriCup ===
Year	Result
2009	6th
2011	4th
2013	4th
2015	6th
2017	3rd place, bronze medalist(s)
2019	6th
2021	7th
2023	3rd place, bronze medalist(s)
2025	4th

=== FIBA U15 Centrobasket ===
Year	Result
2011	1st place, gold medalist(s)
2012	1st place, gold medalist(s)
2014	2nd place, silver medalist(s)
2016	1st place, gold medalist(s)
2018	3rd place, bronze medalist(s)
2022	1st place, gold medalist(s)
2024	1st place, gold medalist(s)

== See also ==
- Puerto Rican Basketball Federation
- Puerto Rico men's national under-19 basketball team
- Puerto Rico women's national under-17 basketball team
