= Dominican Republic men's national under-17 basketball team =

Dominican Republic
- FIBA zone: FIBA Americas
- National federation: Federación Dominicana de Baloncesto

U17 World Cup
- Appearances: 3
- Medals: None

U16 AmeriCup
- Appearances: 6
- Medals: (bronze) Bronze: 1 (2019)

U15 Centrobasket
- Appearances: 5
- Medals: (gold) Gold: 1 (2018); (silver) Silver: 2 (2016, 2022); (bronze) Bronze: 2 (2014, 2024)
| Home | Away |

The Dominican Republic men's national under-15, under-16 and under-17 basketball team is a national basketball team of the Dominican Republic, administered by the Federación Dominicana de Baloncesto. It represents the country in international under-15, under-16 and under-17 basketball competitions.

== FIBA U15 Centrobasket participations ==
| Year | Result |
|---|---|
| 2014 | 3rd place, bronze medalist(s) |
| 2016 | 2nd place, silver medalist(s) |
| 2018 | 1st place, gold medalist(s) |
| 2022 | 2nd place, silver medalist(s) |
| 2024 | 3rd place, bronze medalist(s) |

== FIBA Under-16 AmeriCup participations ==
| Year | Result |
|---|---|
| 2015 | 4th |
| 2017 | 5th |
| 2019 | 3rd place, bronze medalist(s) |
| 2021 | 4th |
| 2023 | 6th |
| 2025 | 6th |

== FIBA Under-17 Basketball World Cup record ==
| Year | Pos. | Pld | W | L |
|---|---|---|---|---|
| (Germany) 2010 | Did not participate | | | |
| (Lithuania) 2012 | Did not participate | | | |
| (United Arab Emirates) 2014 | Did not participate | | | |
| (Spain) 2016 | 11th | 7 | 2 | 5 |
| (Argentina) 2018 | 9th | 7 | 3 | 4 |
| (Spain) 2022 | 11th | 7 | 3 | 4 |
| (Turkey) 2024 | Did not qualify | | | |
| (Turkey) 2026 | Did not qualify | | | |
| (Greece) 2028 | To be determined | | | |
| Total | 3/9 | 21 | 8 | 13 |

== See also ==
- Dominican Republic men's national basketball team
- Dominican Republic men's national under-19 basketball team
- Dominican Republic women's national under-15 and under-16 basketball team
