= Estadio Cincuentenario =

Indoor arena in Formosa, Argentina

Estadio Polideportivo Cincuentenario
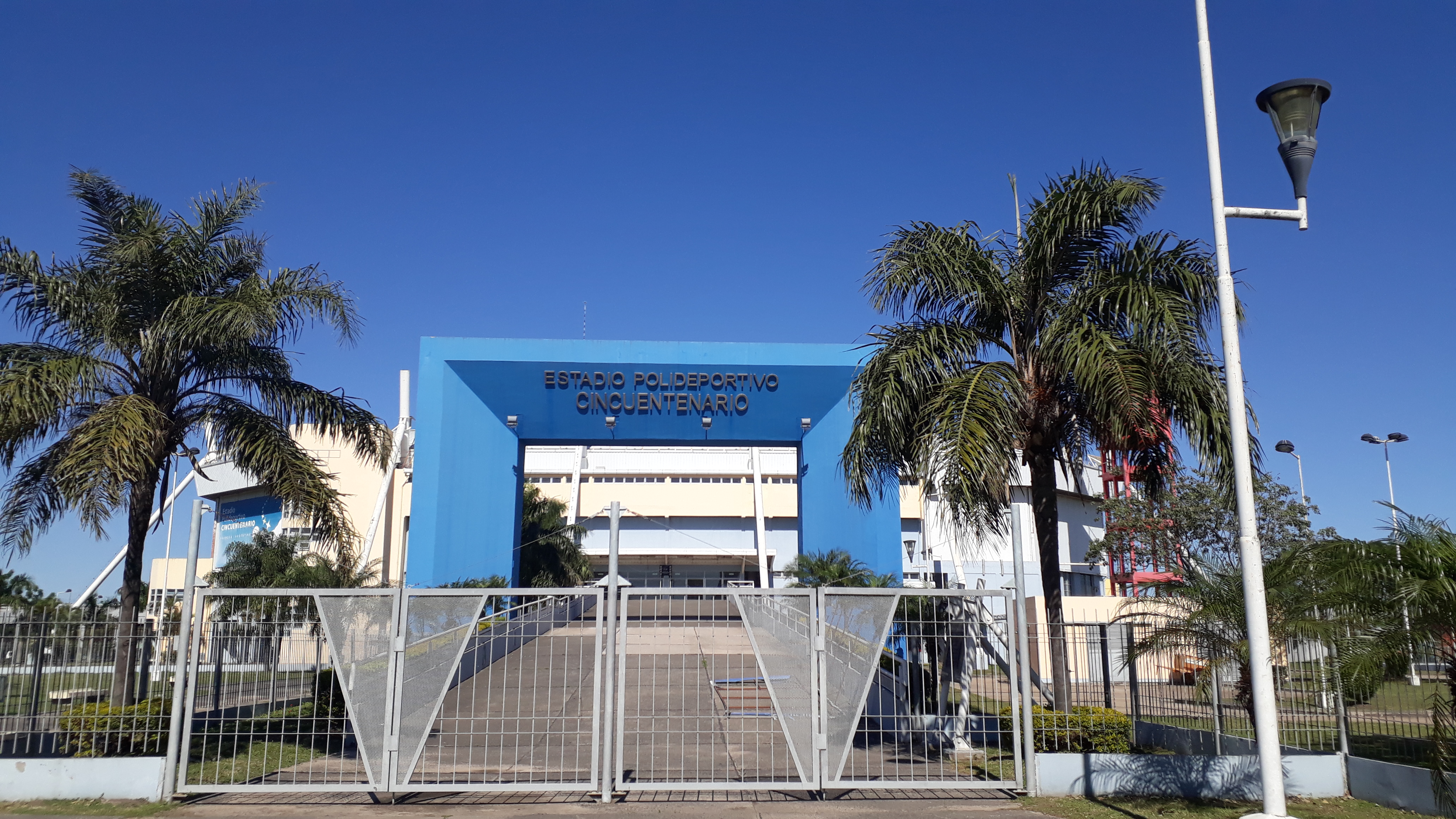
- Estadio Cincuentenario
- Interactive map of Estadio Polideportivo Cincuentenario
- Location: Formosa, Argentina
- Coordinates: 26.1849°S 58.1971°W
- Capacity: 4,500
- Surface: 12,000 m^{2}

Construction
- Opened: October 16th, 2007

Tenant
- Formosa Province Government

The Estadio Polideportivo Cincuentenario is an indoor arena in Formosa, Argentina. It hosts basketball, volleyball, futsal, boxing, handball and artistic events. Club La Unión of the Liga Nacional de Básquetbol plays its home matches at the stadium. The club's volleyball team also plays its home matches for the Liga Argentina de Voleibol – Serie A1 at the Cincuentenario.

== Facilities ==
The arena is part of a 40-hectare (99-acre) area located at the intersection of the avenues Paseo de Las Americas and Antarctica Argentina. The area also includes the Antonio Romero football stadium, a kart track, a velodrome and a hostel.

The stadium occupies an area of 12,000 square metres (130,000 sq ft). In addition, the stadium has seven broadcast booths, a press area, four locker rooms, a conference room, a cafeteria, and two gyms. It has a central electronic four-headed scoreboard.

== Events ==
- 2008 FIBA Americas Under-18 Championship
- South American Olympic men's qualification 2008
- 2010 Torneo Súper 8
- 2012 FIBA Americas League Final Four
- 2015 FIVB Volleyball World Grand Prix
- 2017 FIBA Under-16 Americas Championship
