= NBB All-Star Game =

- Status: Active
- Frequency: Annually
- Inaugurated: 2009
- Most recent: 2025
- Organizer: NBB

The NBB All-Star Game (also known as Jogo das Estrelas do NBB) is an annual game involving the All-Star players of each season of the Novo Basquete Brasil (New Basketball Brazil), which is the top-tier level Brazilian professional club basketball league.

== Format ==
The players are chosen by votes on the Internet, and are then divided into two teams. The criterion for the selection of the teams has varied during the years. In the first edition of the NBB All-Star Game, the teams were divided into team Ubiratan, with light jerseys, and formed by the best players of each position; and team Rosa Branca, with dark jerseys, and formed by the second top players in each position. In the second edition, they were chosen by votes on the Internet, and divided into team Pedroca and team Kanela. In the third and fourth editions, the teams were selected in the same way, but formed into team NBB Brasil (NBB Brazil), formed by the best Brazilian players of the season, and team NBB Mundo (NBB World), formed by the best foreign players of the season.

== NBB All-Star Weekend ==
The NBB All-Star Weekend is an annual event involving the All-star players of each season of the Novo Basquete Brasil (New Basketball Brazil), which is the top-tier level amercican professional club basketball league. This event features the NBB Dunks Tournament and the NBB Three-point Tournament (both featured since the first edition of the All-Star Weekend), and the NBB Skills Challenge (featured since the 2011 edition).

== Results ==
=== Original format ===
Year	Result	Arena	MVP (Club)
2009	Ubiratan 117 – Rosa Branca 126	(Maracanãzinho), Rio de Janeiro, RJ	(United States) Shamell Stallworth (Limeira)
2010	Kanela 127 – Pedroca 114	(Ginásio Tancredo Neves), Uberlândia, MG	(Brazil) Marcelinho Machado (Flamengo)

=== NBB Brasil (NBB Brazil) versus NBB Mundo (NBB World) ===
It was not held in 2020 and 2021 due to COVID-19.

Year	Result	Arena	MVP (Club)
2011	NBB Brasil 99 – NBB Mundo 115	(Ginásio Pedrocão), Franca, SP	(United States) Robert Day (Uberlândia)
2012	NBB Brasil 125 – NBB Mundo 102	(Ginásio Pedrocão), Franca, SP	(Brazil) Murilo Becker (São José)
2013	NBB Brasil 146 – NBB Mundo 144 (OT)	(Ginásio Nilson Nelson), Brasília, DF	(Brazil) Alex Garcia (Brasília)
2014	NBB Brasil 126 – NBB Mundo 116	(Sarasate Arena), Fortaleza, CE	(Brazil) Alex Garcia (2) (Brasília)
2015	NBB Brasil 131 – NBB Mundo 110	(Ginásio Pedrocão), Franca, SP	(Brazil) Ricardo Fischer (Bauru)
2016	NBB Brasil 135 – NBB Mundo 138	(Ginásio Municipal Hugo Ramos), Mogi das Cruzes, SP	(United States) Shamell Stallworth (2) (Mogi)
2017	NBB Brasil 96 – NBB Mundo 108	Ginásio do Ibirapuera	(United States) Shamell Stallworth (3) (Mogi)
2018	NBB Brasil 130 – NBB Mundo 121	Ginásio do Ibirapuera	(Brazil) Anderson Varejão (Flamengo)
2019	NBB Brasil 144 – NBB Mundo 92	(Ginásio Pedrocão), Franca, SP	(United States) Robert Day (Uberlândia)

=== Format of captains ===
Four all-star teams participated in the semifinals. The winners played in the Grand final and the defeated claimed the third place.

Year	Result	Arena	MVP (Club)
2021	NBB Brasil (Time Brabo) 26 x 16 NBB Novas Estrelas (Time Georginho)	(Ginásio do Tijuca Tênis Clube), Rio de Janeiro, RJ	(Brazil) Lucas Dias (Franca)
2022	NBB Brasil (Time Caboclo) 30 x 27 NBB Novas Estrelas (Time Yago)	(Carioca Arena 1), Rio de Janeiro, RJ	(Brazil) Lucas Mariano (Franca)
2023	NBB Mundo (Time ) 23 x 33 NBB Brasil (Time Lucas Dias)	(Juscelino Kubitschek Arena), Belo Horizonte, MG	(Brazil) Lucas Dias (Franca)
2024	Team André Góes 22 x 21 Team Marcio	(Carioca Arena 1), Rio de Janeiro, RJ	(Brazil) Lucas Dias (Franca)
2025	Team Jhonatan 23 x 20 Team Reynan	(Juscelino Kubitschek Arena), Belo Horizonte, MG	(Brazil) Lucas Dias (4) (Franca)

=== Players with most MVP awards ===
Player	Wins	Editions
(Brazil) Lucas Dias	4	2021, 2023, 2024, 2025
(United States) Shamell Stallworth	3	2009, 2016, 2017
(Brazil) Alex Garcia	2	2013, 2014

== 2008-09 season ==
=== Roster ===
Ubiratan
Pos	Player	Team	No. of selections	
Starters
G	Alex Garcia	Brasília	1	
G	Marcelinho Machado	Flamengo	1	
F	Rogério Klafke	Franca	1	
F	Guilherme Teichmann	Limeira	1	
C	Rafael Araújo	Flamengo	1	
Reserves
F	Arthur Belchor Silva	Brasília	1	—
C	Shilton dos Santos	Joinville	1	—
F	Felipe Ribeiro	Franca	1	—
G	Arlindo Neto	Araraquara	1	—
C	William Drudi	Franca	1	—
G	Felipinho	CETAF/Vila Velha	1	—
G	Hélio Lima	Flamengo	1	—
Head coach: Hélio Rubens Garcia (Franca)

Rosa Branca
Pos	Player	Team	No. of selections	
Starters
G	Valtinho	Brasília	1	
G	Duda Machado	Flamengo	1	
F	Marquinhos	Pinheiros	1	
F	Murilo Becker	Minas	1	
C	Bruno Fiorotto	Limeira	1	
Reserves
F	Jefferson William	Flamengo	1	—
F	Shamell Stallworth	Limeira	1	—
C	Estevam Ferreira	Brasília	1	—
F	Antwine Williams	Joinville	1	—
G	Larry Taylor	Bauru	1	—
F	Dedé Stefanelli	Paulistano	1	—
F	Olivinha	Pinheiros	1	—
Head coach: Cláudio Mortari (Pinheiros)

==== Game ====
Sportv

March 22, 2009
1:00 p.m. UTC-03

Ubiratan 117, Rosa Branca 126
Pts: Marcelinho Machado 25	Pts: Shamell Stallworth 26

Maracanãzinho, Rio de Janeiro, Rio de Janeiro
Attendance: 5,200

== 2009–10 season ==
=== Roster ===
Kanela
Pos	Player	Team	No. of selections	
Starters
G	Manteguinha	Joinville	1	
G	Marcelinho Machado	Flamengo	2	
F	Guilherme Filipin	Londrina	1	
F	Olivinha	Pinheiros	2	
C	Murilo Becker	Minas	2	
Reserves
F	Rogério Klafke	Franca	2	—
C	Deivisson Costa	Araraquara	1	—
F	John Thomas	Assis	1	—
G	Fúlvio de Assis	São José	1	—
C	Rafael Mineiro	São José	1	—
G	Fernando Penna	Paulistano	1	—
F	Alex Oliveira	Bauru	1	—
Head coach: Lula Ferreira (Brasília)

Pedroca
Pos	Player	Team	No. of selections	
Starters
G	Valtinho	Brasília	2	
G	Alex Garcia	Brasília	2	
F	Shamell Stallworth	Pinheiros	2	
F	Guilherme Giovannoni	Brasília	1	
C	Rafael Araújo	Paulistano	2	
Reserves
F	Jefferson Sobral	Joinville	1	—
F	Tony Stockman	Franca	1	—
C	Shilton dos Santos	Joinville	2	—
C	Tiagão	Joinville	1	—
G	Larry Taylor	Bauru	2	—
F	Facundo Sucatzky	Minas	1	—
F	Estevam Ferreira	Brasília	2	—
Head coach: Alberto Bial (Joinville)

==== Game ====
Sportv

February 21, 2010
10:30 a.m. UTC-03

Kanela 127, Pedroca 114
Pts: Marcelinho Machado 38	Pts: Alex Garcia 20

Ginásio Sabiazinho, Uberlândia, Minas Gerais
Attendance: 5,200

== 2010–11 season ==
=== Roster ===
NBB Brasil
Pos	Player	Team	Nº de selections	Votes
Starters
G	Valtinho	Uberlândia	3	2.539
G	Alex Garcia	Brasília	3	4.821
F	Marcelinho Machado	Flamengo	3	5.082
F	Guilherme Giovannoni	Brasília	2	3.827
C	Murilo Becker	São José	3	3.943
Reserves
F	Marquinhos	Pinheiros	2	2.311
C	Rafael Araújo	Flamengo	3	3.161
G	Vítor Benite	Franca	1	2.018
G	Nezinho dos Santos	Brasília	1	2.378
C	Bruno Fiorotto	Pinheiros	2	1.552
G	Raulzinho	Minas	1	2.157
F	Olivinha	Pinheiros	3	1.749
Coach: João Marcelo (Pinheiros)

1. ''INJ' (injury) refers to a player who is out of play due to injury..
2. 'SUB' (substitute) is the player who enters the place that hurt.

NBB Mundo
Pos	Player	Team	Nº de selections	Votes
Starters
G	Larry Taylor	Bauru	3	4.248
G	Shamell Stallworth	Pinheiros	3	5.370
F	Tony Stockman	Assis	2	3.652
F	Maurice Spillers	Franca	1	3.753
C	Jeff Agba	Bauru	1	3.610
Reservas
F	Robert Day	Uberlândia	1	2.319
F	Bernard Robinson	Minas	1	2.194
C	Durelle Brown (INJ)	Limeira	1	2.798
C	Pedro Calderón	Assis	1	1.877
G	Facundo Sucatzky	Minas	2	1.576
G	Juan Pablo Figueroa	Pinheiros	1	1.292
G	Robby Collum	Uberlândia	1	2.891
G	Ronald Ramón (SUB)	Limeira	1	—
Coach: Néstor García (Minas)

==== Game ====
SporTV

January 29, 2011
10:30 a.m. UTC-3

NBB Brasil 99, NBB Mundo 115
Pts: Guilherme Giovannoni 20	Pts: Robert Day 50

Ginásio Pedrocão, Franca, São Paulo
Attendance: 6.000

== 2011–12 season ==
=== Roster ===
NBB Brasil
Pos	Players	Team	Nº de selections	Votes (%)
Starters
G	Fúlvio de Assis	São José	2	43,5
G	Alex Garcia	Brasília	4	35,4
F	Marquinhos (INJ)	Pinheiros	3	31,7
F	Guilherme Giovannoni	Brasília	3	27,4
C	Murilo Becker	São José	4	39,0
Reserves
F	Marcelinho Machado (STA)	Flamengo	4	—
C	Caio Torres	Flamengo	1	—
G	Valtinho (INJ)	Unerlândia	4	—
G	Vítor Benite (SUB)	Limeira	2	—
G	Nezinho dos Santos	Brasília	2	—
C	Lucas Cipolini	Uberlândia	1	—
F	Arthur Belchor Silva	Brasília	2	—
F	Olivinha	Pinheiros	4	—
F	Fernando Fischer (SUB)	Bauru	1	—
Coach: Jorge Guerra (Bauru)

1. 'INJ' (injury) refers to a player who is out of the game due to injury.
2. 'SUB' (substitute) is the player who enters the place that got hurt.
3. The player Rashad Bishop did not participate in the game due to his team being in Puerto Rico to compete in the FIBA Americas League.
4. 'STA' (starter), the player was selected as a starter in place of the player who did not attend the game.

NBB Mundo
Pos	Players	Team	Nº de selections	Votes (%)
Starters
G	Larry Taylor	Bauru	4	82,8
G	Shamell Stallworth	Pinheiros	4	35,5
F	Kevin Sowell	Franca	1	19,5
F	Federico Kammerichs	Flamengo	1	37,7
C	Jeff Agba	Bauru	2	33,6
Reservas
F	Robert Day	Uberlândia	2	—
G	David Jackson	Flamengo	1	—
G	Mark Borders	Minas	1	—
C	Guillermo Araújo	Paulistano	1	—
F	Rashad Bishop (INJ)	Joinville	1	—
C	Steven Toyloy (SUB)	Limeira	1	—
G	Juan Pablo Figueroa	Pinheiros	2	—
G	Robby Collum	Uberlândia	2	—
Coach: Gonzalo Garcia (Flamengo)

==== Game ====
SporTV

March 10, 2012
10:00 a.m. UTC-3

NBB Brasil 125, NBB Mundo 102
Pts: Olivinha 17; Rebs: four players 6 Asts: Nezinho dos Santos 11	Pts: Shamell Stallworth 21; Rebs: Jeff Agba 11; Asts: Shamell Stallworth 4

Ginásio Pedrocão, Franca, São Paulo
Attendance: 6.000

== 2012–13 season ==
=== Roster ===
NBB Brasil
Pos	Player	Team	No. of selections	Votes (%)
Starters
G	Larry Taylor	Bauru	5	43.4
G	Alex Garcia	Brasília	5	26.6
F	Marquinhos	Flamengo	4	44.2
F	Guilherme Giovannoni^{INJ} ^{2}	Brasília	4	30.9
C	Olivinha	Flamengo	5	22.6
Reserves
G	Fúlvio de Assis	São José	3	28.7
G	Nezinho dos Santos	Brasília	3	27.9
G	Vítor Benite	Flamengo	3	14.4
G	Paulinho Boracini	Pinheiros	1	14.7
F	Luis Gruber	Uberlândia	1	14.6
C	Rafael Mineiro	Pinheiros	2	11.6
C	Caio Torres^{2}	Flamengo	2	20.5
F	Jefferson William^{REP}	São José	2	N/A
Head coach: José Alves Neto (Flamengo)

NBB Mundo
Pos	Player	Team	No. of selections	Votes (%)
Starters
G	Kenny Dawkins	Liga Sorocabana	1	47.2
G	Shamell Stallworth	Pinheiros	5	26.5
F	Robert Day	Uberlândia	3	25.1
F	Steven Toyloy	Paulistano	1	33.5
C	Jeff Agba^{INJ} ^{1}	Bauru	3	38.2
Reserves
G	Kojo Mensah	Flamengo	1	37.2
G	Mark Borders	Minas	2	15.5
G	Joe Smith	Pinheiros	2	15.6
F	Benzor Simmons	Vila Velha	1	17.3
F	Desmond Holloway	Liga Sorocabana	1	15.5
C	DeAndre Coleman^{1}	Bauru	1	15.6
C	Guillermo Araújo	Pinheiros	2	12.7
F	Tyrone Curnell^{REP}	Palmeiras	2	N/A
Head coach: Lula Ferreira (Franca)

^INJ Will not participate due to injury.
^REP Tyrone Curnell was named Jeff Agba's replacement.
^1 DeAndre Coleman to start in place of the injured Jeff Agba
^INJ Will not participate due to injury.
^REP Jefferson William was named Jeff Agba's replacement.
^2 Caio Torres to start in place of the injured Guilherme Giovannoni

==== Game ====
Globo
SporTV

March 2, 2013
10:00 (UTC−03:00)

Report

NBB Brasil 146, NBB Mundo 144 (OT)
Scoring by quarter: 36–34, 42–28, 23–34, 31–36, Overtime: 14–12
Pts: Alex 26; Rebs: Rafael Mineiro 9 Asts: Nezinho 7	Pts: Shamell 37; Rebs: Toyloy 14; Asts: Borders 5

Ginásio Nilson Nelson, Brasília, Federal District
Attendance: 5,212
Referees: Cristiano Maranho, Marcos Benito, Diego Chiconato

== Players with most appearances ==
Player	All-Star	Years	MVP	Notes
(Brazil) Alex Garcia	15	2009–2019, 2021-2024	2013, 2014	
(United States) Shamell Stallworth	15	2009–2019, 2021–2023, 2025	2009, 2016, 2017	Captain 2021
(Brazil) Marquinhos Vieira	11	2009, 2011, 2012, 2013, 2015–2019, 2021, 2022	-	Captain 2021
(United States) David Jackson	11	2012, 2014, 2015, 2017, 2018, 2019, 2021-2025	-	Captain 2022
(Brazil) Carlos Olivinha	9	2010–2014, 2017, 2021-2023	-	Captain 2023
(United States) Larry Taylor	9	2009–2013, 2016, 2018, 2022, 2024	-	Captain 2024
(Brazil) Jefferson William	8	2009, 2010, 2013, 2014–2017, 2019	2019	1x Three-Point contest Winner
(Brazil) Guilherme Giovannoni	8	2010-2017	-	
(United States) Desmond Holloway	7	2013–2018, 2021	-	
(Brazil) Marcelinho Machado	7	2009–2012, 2014, 2017, 2018	2010	2x Three-Point contest Winner
(United States) Kenny Dawkins	7	2013-2019	-	
(Brazil) Fúlvio	6	2010, 2012, 2013, 2016, 2017, 2021	-	
(Brazil) Lucas Dias	6	2016, 2021-2025	2021, 2023, 2024	Captain 2023
(United States) Robert Day	5	2011–2014, 2016	2011	
(Brazil) Valtinho	5	2009–2012, 2014,	-	
(Brazil) Nezinho	5	2011-2015	-	1x Skills Challenge Winner
(Brazil) Murilo Becker	5	2009–2012, 2014	2012	1x Skills Challenge Winner

== Topscorers ==
=== Finals ===
Year	Player	Points	Team
2009	(United States) Shamell Stallworth	26 pts	Limeira
2010	(Brazil) Marcelinho Machado	38 pts	Flamengo
2011	(United States) Robert Day	50 pts	Uberlândia
2012	(United States) Shamell Stallworth	21 pts	Pinheiros
2013	(United States) Shamell Stallworth	37 pts	Pinheiros
2014	(Brazil) Alex Garcia	33 pts	Brasília
2015	(Brazil) Ricardo Fischer	26 pts	Bauru
2016	(United States) Shamell Stallworth	33 pts	Mogi das Cruzes
2017	(United States) Shamell Stallworth	18 pts	Mogi das Cruzes
2018	(Brazil) Marquinhos Vieira	29 pts	Flamengo
2019	(Brazil) Jefferson William	28 pts	Bauru

=== Short finals ===
Year	Player	Points	Team
2021	(Brazil) Lucas Dias	10 pts	Franca
2022	(Brazil) Lucas Dias (Brazil) Yago dos Santos	9 pts	Flamengo
2023	(Brazil) Lucas Dias	11 pts	Franca
2024	(Brazil) Lucas Dias	8 pts	Franca
2025	(Brazil) Gui Deodato	6 pts	Flamengo

=== Four-team tournament ===
Year	Player	Overall Points	Team
2021	(Brazil) Lucas Dias	14 pts	Franca
2022	(Brazil) Lucas Dias	18 pts	Franca
2023	(Brazil) Lucas Dias	21 pts	Franca
2024	(Brazil) Lucas Dias	15 pts	Franca
2025	(Brazil) Lucas Dias	16 pts	Franca

== See also ==
- NBB All-Star Weekend

== Sources ==
- Brazilian All-Star Game on Latinbasket.Com
