= NBB All-Star Weekend =

The NBB All-Star Weekend is an annual event involving the All-Star players of each season of the Novo Basquete Brasil (New Basketball Brazil), which is the top-tier level Brazilian professional club basketball league. This event features the NBB Dunks Tournament and the NBB Three-point Tournament (both featured since the first edition of the All-Star Weekend), and the NBB Skills Challenge (featured since the 2011 edition). The NBB All-Star Weekend also features the NBB All-Star Game, as its main event.

== NBB All-Star Game ==
The NBB All-Star Game is an annual game involving the All-Star players of each season of the Novo Basquete Brasil (New Basketball Brazil), which is the top-tier level Brazilian professional club basketball league. The players are chosen by votes on the Internet, and are then divided into two teams. The criterion for the selection of the teams has varied during the years.

== NBB Dunks Tournament ==
| Edition | Player | Position | Nacionality | Team | Ref. |
|---|---|---|---|---|---|
| 2009 | Júlio Toledo | SF | Brazil | Araraquara | |
| 2010 | Rafa Mineiro | C | Brazil | São José | |
| 2011 | Jordan Burger | SF | Brazil | Paulistano | |
| 2012 | Gui Deodato | SF | Brazil | Bauru | |
| 2013 | Gui Deodato (2) | SF | Brazil | Bauru (2) | |
| 2014 | DeVon Hardin | C | United States | Basquete Cearense | |
| 2015 | André Coimbra | PF/C | Brazil | Franca | |
| 2016 | Wesley "Mogi" Alves da Silva | SG | Brazil | Paulistano | |
| 2017 | Cordero Bennett | PG/SG | United States | Pinheiros | |
| 2018 | Guilherme Bento | SG | Brazil | Pinheiros | |
| 2019 | Wesley "Mogi" Alves da Silva | SG | Brazil | Botafogo | |
| 2021 | Wesley "Mogi" Alves da Silva (3) | SG | Brazil | Botafogo | |
| 2022 | Túlio Henrique da Silva | C | Brazil | Flamengo | |
| 2023 | Eden Ewing | C | United States | Minas Tênis | |
| 2024 | Paulo Barbosa | SG | Brazil | Franca | |

== NBB Three-point Tournament ==
| Edition | Player | Position | Nacionality | Team | Ref. |
|---|---|---|---|---|---|
| 2009 | Fernando Fischer | SF | Brazil | Bauru | |
| 2010 | Thiaguinho | PG | Brazil | Pinheiros | |
| 2011 | Fernando Fischer (2) | SF | Brazil | Bauru (2) | |
| 2012 | Helinho | PG | Brazil | Franca | |
| 2013 | Matheus Dalla | SF | Brazil | Limeira | |
| 2014 | Marcelinho Machado | SF | Brazil | Flamengo | |
| 2015 | Marcelinho Machado (2) | SF | Brazil | Flamengo | |
| 2016 | André Coimbra | PF/C | Brazil | Franca | |
| 2017 | Jefferson William | PF/C | Brazil | Bauru | |
| 2018 | Rafa Hettsheimeir | C | Brazil | Bauru | |
| 2019 | Felipe Vezaro | SF | Brazil | AA Joinville | |
| 2021 | Rafa Hettsheimeir (2) | C | Brazil | Flamengo | |
| 2022 | Santiago Scala | PG | Argentina | Franca | |
| 2023 | Augusto Cabral Leão | PG | Brazil | Esporte Clube União Corinthians | |
| 2024 | Trevor Gaskins | SG | United States; Panama | UniFacisa Paraiba | |

== NBB Skills Challenge ==
| Edition | Player | Position | Nacionality | Team | Ref. |
|---|---|---|---|---|---|
| 2011 | Fernando Penna | PG | Brazil | Franca | |
| 2012 | Fernando Penna (2) | PG | Brazil | Franca (2) | |
| 2013 | Fernando Penna (3) | PG | Brazil | Pinheiros | |
| 2014 | Nezinho dos Santos | PG | Brazil | Brasília | |
| 2015 | Thiaguinho | C | Brazil | Liga Sorocabana | |
| 2016 | André Coimbra | PF/C | Brazil | Franca | |
| 2017 | Tyrone Curnell | PF/C | United States | Mogi das Cruzes | |
| 2018 | Murilo Becker | C | Brazil | Vitória | |
| 2019 | Lucas Dias | PF/C | Brazil | Franca | |
| 2021 | Kevin Crescenzi | SF | United States; Brazil | Cerrado Basquete | |
| 2022 | Kyle Fuller | SF | United States; Peru | Corinthians | |
| 2023 | Cassiano Marinho Bueno | PG | Brazil | Rio Claro Basquete | |

== See also ==
- NBB All-Star Game
