= Campeonato Paulista de Basquete Masculino =

Basketball competition in Brazil

Campeonato Paulista de Basquete Masculino Men's São Paulo State Basketball Championship
- Founded: 1932; 94 years ago
- Country: Brazil
- Current champions: (Brazil) Franca (17th title)
- Most championships: (Brazil) Franca (17 titles)
- Website: fpb.com.br

The Campeonato Paulista de Basquete Masculino (English: Men's São Paulo State Basketball Championship), is an annual men's professional club basketball competition. The tournament is contested between clubs from São Paulo State.

== History ==
The first major Paulista State basketball tournament, known as the Paulistano Championship or Capitol Championship, was played in 1925. The tournament existed until 1977. In 1932, the Paulista State Championship began.

== Paulista (São Paulo) State champions ==
Year	Champion	Result	Runner-up
1932	Palestra Itália		Clube Campineiro de Regatas e Natação (Campinas)
1933	Palestra Itália		Clube Campineiro de Regatas e Natação (Campinas)
1934	Palestra Itália		Clube Campineiro de Regatas e Natação (Campinas)
1935	Corinthians		Associação Esportiva Jundiaiense (Jundiaí)
1936	Clube Esperia		Associação Esportiva Jundiaiense (Jundiaí)
1937	Clube Esperia		Associação Sorocabano Basquetebol (Sorocaba)
1938	Clube Esperia		Grêmio Varnhagen (Sorocaba)
1939	Corinthians		São Carlos Clube (São Carlos)
1940	Clube Esperia		Grêmio Varnhagen (Sorocaba)
1941–1946	N/A
1947	Corinthians		Grêmio Esportivo Guaratinguetá (Guaratinguetá)
1948–1950	N/A
1951	Corinthians		Ponte Preta (Campinas)
1952	Corinthians		Tenis Clube São José (São José dos Campos)
1953	N/A
1954	Corinthians	2–1	São Carlos Clube (São Carlos)
1955	Corinthians		XV de Piracicaba (Piracicaba)
1956	N/A
1957	XV de Piracicaba (Piracicaba)		Clube Esperia
1958	Palmeiras		XV de Piracicaba (Piracicaba)
1959	Sírio		XV de Piracicaba (Piracicaba)
1960	XV de Piracicaba (Piracicaba)		Palmeiras
1961	Palmeiras		Sírio
1962	Sírio		Palmeiras
1963	Palmeiras		Sírio
1964	Corinthians		Clube dos Bagres (Franca)
1965	Corinthians		Palmeiras
1966	Corinthians		XV de Piracicaba (Piracicaba)
1967	Sírio		Corinthians
1968	Corinthians		Sírio
1969	Corinthians		Sírio
1970	Sírio		Clube dos Bagres (Franca)
1971	Sírio		Emanuel Franca (Franca)
1972	Palmeiras		Trianon Clube
1973	Emanuel Franca (Franca)		Trianon Clube
1974	Palmeiras		Amazonas Franca (Franca)
1975	Amazonas Franca (Franca)	Quadrangular Final	Palmeiras
1976	Amazonas Franca (Franca)	2–0	Palmeiras
1977	Franca (Franca)	2–1	Sírio
1978	Sírio	2–0	Franca (Franca)
1979	Sírio	2–1	Franca (Franca)
1980	Tenis Clube São José (São José dos Campos)	2–1	Franca (Franca)
1981	Tenis Clube São José (São José dos Campos)	Pentagonal Final	Monte Líbano
1982	Monte Líbano	73–72 (single game)	Corinthians
1983	Corinthians	86–78 (single game)	Sírio
1984	Monte Líbano	82–75 (single game)	Corinthians
1985	Corinthians	81–74 (single game)	Monte Líbano
1986	Monte Líbano	Pentagonal Final	Sírio
1987	Rio Claro (Rio Claro)	3–1	Monte Líbano
1988	Franca (Franca)	4–0	Sírio
1989	Lwart/Lwarcel (Lençóis Paulista)	4–3	Clube Atlético Pirelli (Santo André)
1990	Franca (Franca)	3–0	Rio Claro (Rio Claro)
1991	Rio Claro (Rio Claro)	3–1	Franca (Franca)
1992	Franca (Franca)	80–78 (single game)	Clube do Ipê (Jales)
1993	Rio Claro (Rio Claro)	104–93 (single game)	Franca (Franca)
1994	Rio Claro (Rio Claro)	96–90 (single game)	Sociedade Dançante Recreativa Nosso Clube (Limeira)
1995	Rio Claro (Rio Claro)	3–2	Associação Atlética Guaru (Guarulhos)
1996	Mogi das Cruzes (Mogi das Cruzes)	3–1	Franca (Franca)
1997	Franca (Franca)	3–0	COC/Ribeirão Preto (Ribeirão Preto)
1998	Mackenzie/Microcamp (Barueri)	3–2	Mogi das Cruzes (Mogi das Cruzes)
1999	Bauru (Bauru)	3–1	Franca (Franca)
2000	Franca (Franca)	3–0	Bauru (Bauru)
2001	COC/Ribeirão Preto (Ribeirão Preto)	3–1	Araraquara (Araraquara)
2002	COC/Ribeirão Preto (Ribeirão Preto)	3–0	Araraquara (Araraquara)
2003	COC/Ribeirão Preto (Ribeirão Preto)	3–0	Corinthians/Mogi das Cruzes
2004	COC/Ribeirão Preto (Ribeirão Preto)	3–0	Limeira (Limeira)
2005	COC/Ribeirão Preto (Ribeirão Preto)	3–1	Paulistano
2006	Franca (Franca)	3–2	Assis (Assis)
2007	Franca (Franca)	3–0	Ulbra/AFPSBC (São Bernardo do Campo)
2008	Limeira (Limeira)	3–1	Franca (Franca)
2009	São José (São José dos Campos)	3–0	Paulistano
2010	Limeira (Limeira)	3–1	Pinheiros
2011	Pinheiros	3–1	São José (São José dos Campos)
2012	São José (São José dos Campos)	3–2	Pinheiros
2013	Bauru (Bauru)	3–0	Paulistano
2014	Bauru (Bauru)	3–1	Limeira (Limeira)
2015	São José (São José dos Campos)	2–1	Mogi das Cruzes (Mogi das Cruzes)
2016	Mogi das Cruzes (Mogi das Cruzes)	2–0	Bauru (Bauru)
2017	Paulistano	3–2	Franca (Franca)
2018	Franca (Franca)	2–0	Paulistano
2019	Franca (Franca)	2–0	Corinthians
2020	Franca (Franca)	70–54 (single game)	Paulistano
2021	São Paulo	2–1	Franca (Franca)
2022	Franca (Franca)	2–1	São Paulo
2023	Paulistano	83–82 (single game)	Corinthians
2024	Franca (Franca)	87–73 (single game)	São José (São José dos Campos)
2025	Franca (Franca)	3–0	Mogi das Cruzes (Mogi das Cruzes)

== Titles by club ==
Club	Championships	Years won	Runners-up	Years runner-up
Franca	17	1973, 1975, 1976, 1977, 1988, 1990, 1992, 1997, 2000, 2006, 2007, 2018, 2019, 2020, 2022, 2024, 2025	13	1964, 1970, 1971, 1974, 1978, 1979, 1980, 1991, 1993, 1996, 1999, 2008, 2017, 2021
Corinthians	14	1935, 1939, 1947, 1951, 1952, 1954, 1955, 1964, 1965, 1966, 1968, 1969, 1983, 1985	5	1967, 1982, 1984, 2003, 2023
Palmeiras	8	1932, 1933, 1934, 1958, 1961, 1963, 1972, 1974	5	1960, 1962, 1965, 1975, 1976
Sírio	7	1959, 1962, 1967, 1970, 1971, 1978, 1979	8	1961, 1963, 1968, 1969, 1977, 1983, 1986, 1988
São José	5	1980, 1981, 2009, 2012, 2015	3	1952, 2011, 2024
Rio Claro Basquete	5	1987, 1991, 1993, 1994, 1995	1	1990
COC/Ribeirão Preto	5	2001, 2002, 2003, 2004, 2005	1	1997
Clube Esperia	4	1936, 1937, 1938, 1940	1	1957
Monte Líbano	3	1982, 1984, 1986	3	1981, 1985, 1987
Bauru	3	1999, 2013, 2014	2	2000, 2016
Paulistano	2	2017, 2023	4	2005, 2009, 2013, 2018
XV de Piracicaba	2	1957, 1960	4	1955, 1958, 1959, 1966
Mogi das Cruzes	2	1996, 2016	4	1998, 2003, 2015, 2025
Limeira	2	2008, 2010	2	2004, 2014
Pinheiros	1	2011	2	2010, 2012
São Paulo	1	2021	1	2022
Lwart/Lwarcel	1	1989	0	
Mackenzie/Microcamp	1	1998	0	
Clube Campineiro de Regatas e Natação	0		3	1932, 1933, 1934
Associação Esportiva Jundiaiense	0		2	1935, 1936
Grêmio Varnhagen	0		2	1938, 1940
São Carlos Clube	0		2	1939, 1954
Trianon Clube	0		2	1972, 1973
Associação de Basquetebol de Araraquara	0		2	2001, 2002
Associação Sorocabano Basquetebol	0		1	1937
Grêmio Esportivo Guaratinguetá	0		1	1947
Ponte Preta	0		1	1951
Clube Atlético Pirelli	0		1	1989
Clube do Ipê	0		1	1992
Sociedade Dançante Recreativa Nosso Clube	0		1	1994
Associação Atlética Guaru	0		1	1995
Assis	0		1	2006
Ulbra/AFPSBC	0		1	2007

== Topscorers ==
=== Per game ===
Year	Player	Team	PPG	Pld
1979	(Brazil) Oscar Schmidt	Sirio		
1995	(Brazil) Oscar Schmidt	Corinthians Paulista		
1996	(United States) Charles Byrd	São Paulo	34.1	
1997	(Brazil) Oscar Schmidt	Corinthians Paulista	41.5 (1,161 pts)	28
1998	(Brazil) Oscar Schmidt	Bandeirantes / Mackenzie	32.1	
2003 (Note: Demétrius Conrado Ferraciú of Pinheiros was the topscorer in points in 2003: 645 in 33 games.)	(Brazil) Fusco	AD Santo Andre	23,74	23
2004 (Note: Paulinho Villas Boas of Corinthians was the topscorer in points in 2004: 477 in 24 games.)	(Brazil) Alfredo	Casa Branca Club	22,61	18
2005	(Brazil) Soró	Bauru	22,84	32
2006 (Note: Shamell Stallworth of Paulistano was the topscorer in points in 2006: 251 in 12 games.)	(Brazil) Fischer	Club Hebraica	21,82	11
2007	(Brazil) Adão	Liga Sorocabana	24,3	20
2010	(Brazil) Alfredo	Americana	18,96	24
2011	(Brazil) Caio Ranches	XV/Cosan	21.6	
2012	(United States) Rashaun McLemore	America/Unirp	22.6	
2013	(United States) Shamell Stallworth	Pinheiros/Sky	19.8	
2015	(United States) Cordero Bennett	Pinheiros	22.1	
2016	(Brazil) Patrick Vieira	Liga Sorocabana	19.9	
2017	(United States) Darnell Artis	America/Unirp	18.6	
2018	(United States) Kyle Fuller	Corinthians Paulista	19.8	
2020	(Brazil) Lucas Dias	Franca	21.1	
2021	(Brazil) Gabriel Galvanini	Bauru	18.7	
2022	(Brazil) (Portugal) Rafael Munford	Pinheiros	19.3	
2023	(Brazil) Lucas Dias	Franca	17.5	
2024	(Brazil) Adyel Borges	Pinheiros	21.9	
2025	(Brazil) Matheus Weber	Osasco	18.7	

== Stats leaders ==
=== Assists ===
Year	Player	Team	Assists	Games
2003	(Brazil) Demétrius Conrado Ferracciú	Franca	8,27	33
2004	(Brazil) Nezinho dos Santos	COC/Ribeirão	7,52	21
2005 (Note: Nezinho dos Santos of Ribeirão had most assists in 2005: 261 in 39 games.)	(Brazil) Demétrius Conrado Ferracciú	Franca	7,06	32
2006	(Brazil) (Italy) Fúlvio de Assis	Conti/Amea/Assis	7,08	36
2007	(Brazil) Nezinho dos Santos	Conti/Amea/Assis	8,0	20

=== Rebounds ===
Year	Player	Team	Rebounds	Games
2003 (Note: Fabião of Franca had most rebounds in 2003: 320 in 33 games.)	(Brazil) William	Hebraica	11,17	24
2004	(Brazil) Ricardo	Paulistano	11,0	22
2005	(Brazil) Ricardo	Paulistano	11,16	37
2006	(Brazil) Mauro	Pinheiros	9,75	12
2007 (Note: Ricardo of Sao Caetano EC had most blocks in 2007: 230 in 20 games.)	(Brazil) Felipe	Conti/Assis	12,39	18

=== Blocks ===
Year	Player	Team	Blocks	Games
2003 (Note: Tiagão of Ribeirao Preto had most blocks in 2003: 41 in 33 games.)	(Brazil) Jonny	Hebraica	1,33	24
2004	(Brazil) Carlos Olivinha	Corinthians/Mogi	1,58	24
2005 (Note: Morro of Sao Caetano EC had most blocks in 2005: 75 in 27 games.)	(Brazil) Marcel	Municipal São Carlos	2,82	11
2006	(Brazil) Thiagão	Unifeob/São João	1,92	12
2007	(Brazil) Morro	Pinheiros	1,63	19

== Awards ==
=== Best foreigner ===
Awarded the Oswaldo Caviglia trophy.

Year	Player	Team
1988	(Uruguay) Horacio López	Ravelli/Franca
1989	(United States) Rocky Merrill Smith	Ravelli/Franca
1993	(United States) Ernest Doyle Patterson	Palmeiras/Parmalat
1994	(United States) Charles Byrd	Pinheiros
1995	(United States) Askia Jones	Rio Claro
1996	(Dominican Republic) José Vargas	Franca Cougar
1998	(United States) Jeffty J. Connely	Valtra / Mogi / C.C.M.C.
1999	(United States) Kwame Gumo Evans	Luso / Tilibra / Copimax

=== Player of the Year ===
Awarded the Oswaldo Caviglia trophy from 1992 and onwards. The Troféu "José Alcino Bentini" was awarded until 1991.

Year	Player	Team
1966	(Brazil) Carlos Domingos Massoni	Palmeiras
1970	(Brazil) Helio Rubens Garcia	Clube dos Bagres (Franca)
1971	(Brazil) Helio Rubens Garcia	Emmanuel/Franca Esporte Clube
1972	(Brazil) Helio Rubens Garcia	Emmanuel/Franca Esporte Clube
1973		
1974	(Brazil) Bira Maciel	Palmeiras
1975	(Brazil) Bira Maciel	Palmeiras
1976		
1977	(Brazil) Robertão	Associação Atlética Francana
1978	(Brazil) Marcel de Souza	Esporte Clube Sírio
1979	(Brazil) Oscar Schmidt	Esporte Clube Sírio
1980	(Brazil) Milton Setrini	Tênis Clube de São José dos Campos
1981	(Brazil) Marcelo Vido	Tênis Clube de São José dos Campos
1982	(Brazil) Marcos Leite	Esporte Clube Sírio
1983	(Brazil) Adilson de Freitas Nascimento	Corinthians
1984	(Brazil) Guerrinha	Associação Francana
1985	(Brazil) Cadum	Monte Líbano
1986	(Brazil) Israel Andrade	Monte Líbano
1987		
1988	(Brazil) Marcos Leite	Esporte Clube Sírio
1989	(Brazil) Luiz Felipe Faria de Azevedo	Lwart-Lwarcel de Lençóis Paulista
1990	(Brazil) Evandro Luiz Saraiva	Ravelli/Franca
1991	(Brazil) Paulo Villas Boas	CESP/Rio Claro
1992	(Brazil) Wilson Minuci	Dharma/Yara/Franca
1993	(Brazil) Josuel	Rio Claro
1994	(Brazil) Josuel	Rio Claro
1995	(Brazil) Oscar Schmidt	Corinthians Amway
1996	(Brazil) Oscar Schmidt	Corinthians Amway
1997	(Brazil) Demétrius Conrado Ferraciú	Marathon/Franca
1998	(Brazil) Danilo Carlos de Castro	Valtra / Mogi / C.C.M.C.
1999	(Brazil) Alex Ribeiro Garcia	COC/ Ribeirão
2000	(Brazil) Valtinho da Silva	Marathon/Franca
2001	(Brazil) Anderson Varejao	Unimed/Franca
2002	(Brazil) Renato Lamas Pinto	COC/Ribeirão Preto
2003	(Brazil) Demétrius Conrado Ferraciú	Unimed/Franca
2004	(Brazil) Nezinho dos Santos	COC/Ribeirão
2005	(Brazil) Nezinho dos Santos	COC/Ribeirão
2006	(Brazil) Hélio Rubens Garcia Filho	Franca Basquetebol
2007	(Brazil) Hélio Rubens Garcia Filho	Unimed/Franca
2008	(Brazil) Nezinho dos Santos	Winner/Limeira
2009	(Brazil) (Italy) Fulvio de Assis	São José/Unimed/Vinac
2010	(Brazil) Carlos Olivinha	Pinheiros/Sky
2011	(Brazil) Murilo Becker	São José/Unimed/Vinac
2012	(Brazil) Rafael Ferreira de Souza	Pinheiros/Sky
2013	(Brazil) Murilo Becker	Bauru
2014	(Brazil) Rafel Hettsheimer	Paschoalotto/Bauru
2015	(United States) Shamell Stallworth	Mogi das Cruzes
2016	(United States) Shamell Stallworth	Mogi das Cruzes
2017	(United States) Kyle Alejandro Fuller	Club Athlético Paulistano
2018	(Brazil) Lucas Dias	Franca
2019	(Brazil) Georginho	São Paulo
2020	(Brazil) Lucas Dias	Franca
2021	(Brazil) Georginho	Sesi Franca
2022	(Brazil) Lucas Mariano	Franca
2023	(Brazil) Kevin Crescenzi	Paulistano
2024	(Brazil) Georginho	Sesi Franca

=== Finals MVP ===
Year	Player	Team
2015	(United States) Jamaal Smith	S.Jose/Unimed
2016	(United States) Shamell Stallworth	Mogi das Cruzes
2017	(United States) Kyle Fuller	Paulistano
2018	(United States) David Jackson	Franca
2020	(Brazil) Lucas Dias	Franca
2021	(United States) Tyrone Curnell	São Paulo
2024	(Brazil) Georginho	Sesi Franca
2025	(Brazil) Lucas Dias	Franca

=== Coach of the Year ===
Awarded the Oswaldo Caviglia trophy from 1992 and onwards. The Troféu "José Alcino Bentini" was awarded until 1991.

Year	Player	Team
1966	(Brazil) Moacyr Brondi Daiuto	Corinthians
1970	(Brazil) Pedro Vicente Fonseca Pecente	Tênis Clube de Campinas
1971	(Brazil) Pedro Murilla Fuentes Pedrocão	Emmanuel/Franca Esporte Clube
1972	(Brazil) Pedro Murilla Fuentes Pedrocão	Emmanuel/Franca Esporte Clube
1973		
1974	(Brazil) Wlamir Marques	Palmeiras
1975	(Brazil) Wlamir Marques	Palmeiras
1976		
1977	(Brazil) Pedro Murilla Fuentes Pedrocão	Associação Atlética Francana
1978	(Brazil) Claudio Mortari	Esporte Clube Sírio
1979	(Brazil) Claudio Mortari	Esporte Clube Sírio
1980	(Brazil) José Edvar Simões	Tênis Clube de São José dos Campos
1981	(Brazil) José Edvar Simões	Tênis Clube de São José dos Campos
1982	(Brazil) Luiz Carlos Gomes Rebello	Corinthians
1983	(Brazil) Luiz Carlos Gomes Rebello	Corinthians
1984	(Brazil) José Edvar Simões	Monte Líbano
1985	(Brazil) José Edvar Simões	Monte Líbano
1986	(Brazil) Hélio Rubens Garcia	Associação Francana
1987		
1988	(Brazil) Hélio Rubens Garcia	Associação Francana
1989	(Brazil) Claudio Mortari	Clube Atlético Pirelli
1990	(Brazil) José Edvar Simões	Monte Líbano
1991	(Brazil) Luiz Carlos Gomes Rebello	Report/Suzano
1992	(Brazil) Hélio Rubens Garcia	All Star/Sabesp/Franca
1993	(Brazil) Carlos Alberto Rodrigues Carlão	Dharma/Yara/Franca
1994	(Brazil) Hélio Rubens Garcia	Franca Basquetebol Clube
1995	(Brazil) Zé Boquinha	Polti Vaporetto/Blue Life/Rio Claro
1996	(Brazil) Claudio Mortari	Report/Eroles/Mogi
1997	(Brazil) Helio Rubens Garcia	Marathon/Gallus
1998	(Brazil) Nilo Martins Guimarães	Valtra/Mogi/C.C.M.C.
1999	(Brazil) Guerrinha	Luso/Tilibra/Copimax
2000	(Brazil) Daniel Abrão Wattfy	Marathon/Franca
2001	(Brazil) Lula Ferreira	COC/Ribeirão Preto
2002	(Brazil) Lula Ferreira	COC/Ribeirão Preto
2003	(Brazil) Lula Ferreira	COC/Ribeirão Preto
2004	(Brazil) Luiz Augusto Zanon	Winner/Limeira
2005	(Brazil) Lula Ferreira	COC/Ribeirão Preto
2006	(Brazil) Hélio Rubens Garcia	Franca Basquetebol
2007	(Brazil) Hélio Rubens Garcia	Unimed/Franca
2008	(Brazil) Luiz Augusto Zanon	Winner/Limeira
2009	(Brazil) Régis Roberto Marrelli	São José/Unimed/Vinac
2010	(Brazil) Demetrius Conrado Ferracciu	Winner/Limeira
2011	(Brazil) Régis Roberto Marrelli	São José/Unimed/Vinac
2012	(Brazil) Claudio Mortari	Pinheiros/Sky
2013	(Brazil) Guerrinha	Bauru
2014	(Brazil) Guerrinha	Paschoalotto/Bauru
2015	(Brazil) Cristiano Montenegro Ahmed	São José Basketball
2016	(Brazil) Guerrinha	Mogi das Cruzes
2017	(Brazil) David Eduardo Pelosini	Esporte Clube Pinheiros
2018	(Brazil) Helinho	Franca
2019	(Brazil) Helinho	Franca
2020	(Brazil) Helinho	Franca
2021	(Brazil) Claudio Mortari	São Paulo
2022	(Brazil) Helinho	Franca
2023	(Brazil) Demétrius Conrado Ferracciú	C.A. Paulistano
2024	(Brazil) Régis Roberto Marelli	Farma Conde/São José Basketball

== Records ==
According to the FPB (São Paulo Basketball Federation), which only has statistical data from the 1995 championship onwards:

- On 28 October 1997, Oscar Schmidt scored 57 pts in the game Banco Bandeirantes - Tilibra-Copimax (125-116) at the Ginásio Boa Vista in Bauru.
- On 17 November 1997, Oscar Schmidt scored 59 pts in the game Banco Bandeirantes - Marathon/Franca (122-101) at the Ginásio Boa Vista in Bauru.
- On 28 November 1997, Oscar Schmidt scored 74 pts in the game Banco Bandeirantes - Corinthians (145-136) at the Ginásio Boa Vista in Bauru.
- On 28 November 1997, the most points in the history of the Paulista championship were scored in the game mentioned above Banco Bandeirantes - Corinthians (145-136).
- The previous record set on 11 November 1997 with 273 points in the Banco Bandeirantes - Singular-Carrefour/Santo André match (155 - 118).

== See also ==
- New Basket Brazil (NBB)
- Brazilian Championship
- Rio de Janeiro State Championship

== Sources ==
- Trofeu Oswaldo Caviglia Awards
