= 2022–23 NBB season =

2022–23 Novo Basquete Brasil
- League: Novo Basquete Brasil
- Season: 2022–23
- Teams: 17
- TV partner(s): ESPN Brasil; SporTV; TV Cultura

Regular season
- Top seed: Franca
- Season MVP: Lucas Dias (Franca)

Finals
- Champions: Franca (2nd NBB title; 13th national title)
- Runners-up: São Paulo
- Finals MVP: Georginho (Franca)

Seasons
- ← 2021-22 2023-24 →

The 2022–23 NBB season was the 13th season of the Novo Basquete Brasil (NBB), the highest level basketball league in Brazil. The season began on 15 October 2022 and ended 10 June 2023.

Sesi/Franca won its second consecutive championship, after defeating São Paulo in the finals.

== Regular season ==
Pos	Team	Pld	W	L	PF	PA	PD	Pts	Qualification
1	Franca	32	32	0	2896	2464	+432	64	Advance to quarter-finals
2	Flamengo	32	28	4	2707	2207	+500	60	Advance to quarter-finals
3	São Paulo	32	22	10	2739	2548	+191	54	Advance to quarter-finals
4	Minas	32	22	10	2769	2524	+245	54	Advance to quarter-finals
5	Paulistano	32	21	11	2508	2346	+162	53	Advance to eight-finals
6	Pinheiros	32	20	12	2600	2491	+109	52	Advance to eight-finals
7	Bauru	32	19	13	2499	2275	+224	51	Advance to eight-finals
8	Corinthians	32	17	15	2597	2527	+70	49	Advance to eight-finals
9	Unifacisa	32	16	16	2486	2542	−56	48	Advance to eight-finals
10	São José	32	15	17	2599	2642	−43	47	Advance to eight-finals
11	Caxias do Sul	32	12	20	2347	2448	−101	44	Advance to eight-finals
12	Pato Basquete	32	10	22	2491	2700	−209	42	Advance to eight-finals
13	União Corinthians	32	10	22	2514	2638	−124	42	
14	Fortaleza/Cearense	32	9	23	2360	2680	−320	41	
15	Rio Claro	32	7	25	2429	2830	−401	39	
16	Brasília	32	7	25	2486	2811	−325	39	
17	Cerrado	32	5	27	2602	2956	−354	37	

Source: Novo Basquete Brasil

== Playoffs ==
First round
8	Corinthians	0
9	Unifacisa	2
5	Paulistano	2
12	Pato Basquete	1
7	Bauru	2
10	São José	1
6	Pinheiros	2
11	Caxias do Sul	1

Quarter-finals
1	Franca	3
9	Unifacisa	2
4	Minas	3
5	Paulistano	2
2	Flamengo	3
7	Bauru	1
3	São Paulo	3
6	Pinheiros	1

Semi-finals
1	Franca	3
4	Minas	2
2	Flamengo	0
3	São Paulo	3

Final
1	Franca	3
3	São Paulo	2

== Individual awards ==
On 10 June 2023, Georginho was named Finals MVP. The 2022–23 season awards were announced on 14 June 2023.

2022-23 NBB season awards
Award	Player	Club
MVP	Lucas Dias	Franca
Finals MVP	Georginho	Franca
Coach of the Year	Helinho	Franca
Sixth Man of the Year	Santiago Scala	Franca
Foreigner of the Year	Shaq Johnson	Minas
Best Young Player	Ruan Miranda	Cerrado
Most Improved Player	Antônio Ferreira	Unifacisa
Defensive Player	Corderro Bennett	São Paulo
All-NBB Team	Lucas Dias	Franca
All-NBB Team	Georginho	Franca
All-NBB Team	Lucas Mariano	Franca
All-NBB Team	David Jackson	Franca
All-NBB Team	Shaq Johnson	Minas
