= 2020–21 NBB season =

- League: Novo Basquete Brasil
- Sport: Basketball
- Duration: 10 November 2010 – 27 May 2021
- Number of teams: 16
- TV partner(s): DAZN; ESPN Brasil; TV Cultura

Regular season
- Top seed: Flamengo
- Season MVP: Lucas Mariano (Franca)
- Top scorer: Lucas Dias (Franca)

Playoffs
- Finals champions: Flamengo (8th national title)
- Runners-up: São Paulo
- Finals MVP: Yago (Flamengo)

Seasons
- ← 2019–20 2021–22 →

The 2020–21 NBB season was the 13th season of the Novo Basquete Brasil (NBB), the highest level basketball league in Brazil.

== Team changes ==
▲ Promoted from 2019–20 Liga Ouro	▼ Relegated from the 2019–20 NBB season
Cerrado; Campo Mourão; Caxias do Sul	Botafogo; São José; Rio Claro (withdrew)

== Regular season ==
Quarterfinals
Eightfinals

Pos	2021–22 NBB regular season										
Pos	Team	PCT	Pts	Pld	W	L	Home	Away	PF	PA	PP
1	Flamengo	93.3%	58	30	28	2	15–0	13–2	2690	2156	+534
2	Minas	86.7%	56	30	26	4	14–1	12–3	2541	2229	+312
3	São Paulo	76.7%	53	30	23	7	12–3	11–4	2705	2324	+381
4	Paulistano	73.3%	52	30	22	8	13–2	9–6	2293	2182	+111
5	Bauru	63.3%	49	30	19	11	11–4	8–7	2462	2292	+170
6	Corinthians	56.7%	47	30	17	13	10–5	7–8	2316	2246	+70
7	Franca	50.0%	45	30	15	15	10–5	5–10	2610	2507	+103
8	Mogi das Cruzes	50.0%	45	30	15	15	8–7	7–8	2409	2474	-65
9	Unifacisa	46.7%	44	30	14	16	8–7	6–9	2473	2448	+25
10	Fortaleza/Basquete Cearense	46.7%	44	30	14	16	7–8	7–8	2298	2279	+19
11	Pato Basquete	40.0%	42	30	12	18	7–8	5–10	2243	2507	-264
12	Caxias do Sul	30.0%	39	30	9	21	5–10	4–11	2283	2428	-145
13	Esporte Clube Pinheiros (basketball)	26.7%	38	30	8	22	5–10	3–12	2131	2488	-357
14	Cerrado Basquete	23.3%	37	30	7	23	4–11	3–12	2236	2398	-162
15	Campo Mourão	20.0%	36	30	6	24	3–12	3–12	2279	2609	-330
16	Brasília Basquete	16.7%	35	30	5	25	3–12	2–13	2297	2699	-402

Source: NBB

== Playoffs ==
Eightfinals
8	Mogi das Cruzes	2
9	Unifacisa	1
5	Bauru	2
12	Caxias do Sul	0
7	Franca	2
10	Fortaleza/Cearense	0
6	Corinthians	2
11	Pato Basquete	0

Quarterfinals
1	Flamengo	2
8	Mogi das Cruzes	0
4	Paulistano	2
5	Bauru	1
2	Minas	2
7	Franca	1
3	São Paulo	2
6	Corinthians	0

Semifinals
1	Flamengo	3
4	Paulistano	0
2	Minas	0
3	São Paulo	3

Finals
1	Flamengo	3
3	São Paulo	0

== Statistics ==
=== Individual statistical leaders ===
Leaders after the regular season.

Category	Player	Team(s)	Statistic
Points per game	Lucas Dias	Franca	22.8
Rebounds per game	Thiago Mathias	Fortaleza/Cearense	9.7
Assists per game	Fúlvio	Mogi das Cruzes	6.3
Blocks per game	Dontrell Brite	Bauru	2.2
Efficiency per game	Georginho	Franca	24.8
