= 2019–20 NBB season =

- League: Novo Basquete Brasil
- Sport: Basketball
- Duration: 12 October 2019 – 15 March 2020
- Teams: 16
- TV partner(s): DAZN; ESPN Brasil; TV Cultura

Regular season
- Season MVP: Georginho (São Paulo
- Top scorer: Total: Shamell Stallworth (São Paulo); Average: Leandro Barbosa (Minas)

Playoffs
- Finals champions: Not played

Seasons
- ← 2018–19 2020–21 →

The 2019–20 NBB season was the 12th season of the Novo Basquete Brasil (NBB), the highest level basketball league in Brazil. The season began on 21 September 2019 but was suspended on 15 March 2020 because of the COVID-19 pandemic which broke out in the country. On 4 May the season was finally cancelled.

== Team changes ==
| ▲ Promoted from 2018–19 Liga Ouro | ▼ Relegated from the 2018–19 NBB season |
|---|---|
| São Paulo; Rio Claro; Pato Basquete | Vasco da Gama |

== Regular season ==
Quarterfinals
Eightfinals

| Pos | 2019–20 NBB regular season | | | | | | | | | | |
| Pos | Team | PCT | Pts | Pld | W | L | Home | Away | PF | PA | PP |
|---|---|---|---|---|---|---|---|---|---|---|---|
| 1 | Flamengo | 87,5% | 45 | 24 | 21 | 3 | 9–3 | 12–0 | 2040 | 1851 | +189 |
| 2 | Franca | 80,0% | 45 | 25 | 20 | 5 | 10–3 | 10–2 | 2186 | 1975 | +211 |
| 3 | São Paulo | 76,9% | 46 | 26 | 20 | 6 | 8–5 | 12–1 | 2302 | 2122 | +180 |
| 4 | Minas | 65,4% | 43 | 26 | 17 | 9 | 7–6 | 10–3 | 2252 | 2117 | +135 |
| 5 | Mogi das Cruzes | 61,5% | 42 | 26 | 16 | 10 | 10–3 | 6–7 | 2152 | 2117 | +35 |
| 6 | Pinheiros | 55,6% | 42 | 27 | 15 | 12 | 7–7 | 8–5 | 2202 | 2157 | +45 |
| 7 | Corinthians | 50,0% | 39 | 26 | 13 | 13 | 9–5 | 4–8 | 2141 | 2052 | +89 |
| 8 | Botafogo | 50,0% | 39 | 26 | 13 | 13 | 6–5 | 7–8 | 2038 | 2098 | -60 |
| 9 | Rio Claro | 50,0% | 39 | 26 | 13 | 13 | 6–6 | 7–7 | 2195 | 2253 | -58 |
| 10 | Unifacisa | 48,1% | 40 | 27 | 13 | 14 | 10–5 | 3–9 | 2246 | 2187 | +59 |
| 11 | Paulistano | 44,0% | 36 | 25 | 11 | 14 | 5–8 | 6–6 | 2042 | 2077 | -35 |
| 12 | Bauru | 42,3% | 37 | 26 | 11 | 15 | 5–9 | 6–6 | 2084 | 2106 | -22 |
| 13 | Universo/Brasília | 30,8% | 34 | 26 | 8 | 18 | 4–8 | 4–10 | 1975 | 2234 | -259 |
| 14 | São José | 25,9% | 34 | 27 | 7 | 20 | 3–10 | 4–10 | 2330 | 2486 | -156 |
| 15 | Basquete Cearense | 19,2% | 31 | 26 | 5 | 21 | 3–10 | 2–11 | 1985 | 2107 | -122 |
| 16 | Pato Basquete | 16,0% | 29 | 25 | 4 | 21 | 3–9 | 1–12 | 1774 | 2005 | -231 |

Source: NBB

== Statistics ==
=== Individual statistical leaders ===
Leaders of the regular season before the season was cancelled.

| Category | Player | Team(s) | Statistic |
|---|---|---|---|
| Efficiency per game | Georginho | São Paulo | 24.1 |
| Points per game | Leandro Barbosa | Minas | 20.1 |
| Rebounds per game | Georginho | São Paulo | 8.7 |
| Assists per game | Pepo Vidal | Unifacisa | 7.6 |
| Steals per game | Gegê | Pato Basquete | 2.2 |
| Blocks per game | João Vitor | Unifacisa | 1.5 |
| FG% | Georginho | Franca | 24.8 |
| 3P% | Parodi | Franca | 50.6% |
