= Novo Basquete Brasil awards =

Brazilian basketball awards

The Novo Basquete Brasil awards (English: New Basketball Brazil awards) are the yearly individual awards that are given by Brazil's top-tier level men's professional club basketball league, the Novo Basquete Brasil (NBB) (New Basketball Brazil).

== NBB MVP ==
The NBB MVP is a New Basket Brazil award given to the best performing player of the season. It has been given since the first season of the Brazilian league, in 2009. The greatest winner is the forward Marcelinho Machado, with two consecutive awards. The award is given at the end of the season, at the wrap party of the championship, one day after the final game. Before the event, three candidates are announced and during the event the winner is chosen.

Season	Player	Position	Nationality	Team	Ref.
2009	Marcelinho Machado	SF	Brazil	Flamengo	
2009–10	Marcelinho Machado (2)	SF	Brazil	Flamengo (2)	
2010–11	Guilherme Giovannoni	PF	Brazil	Brasília	
2011–12	Murilo Becker	C	Brazil	São José	
2012–13	Marquinhos Vieira	SF	Brazil	Flamengo (3)	
2013–14	David Jackson	SG	United States	Limeira	
2014–15	Alex Garcia	SG	Brazil	Bauru	
2015–16	Marquinhos Vieira (2)	SF	Brazil	Flamengo (4)	
2016–17	Desmond Holloway	SG	United States	Pinheiros	
2017–18	Marquinhos Vieira (3)	SF	Brazil	Flamengo (5)	
2018–19	J. P. Batista	C	Brazil	Mogi das Cruzes	
2020–21	Lucas Mariano	C	Brazil	São Paulo	
2021–22	Bruno Caboclo	F/C	Brazil	São Paulo (2)	
2022–23	Lucas Dias	PF	Brazil	Franca	
2023–24	Lucas Dias (2)	PF	Brazil	Franca (2)	
2024–25	Dontrell Brite	PG	United States	Bauru (2)	

=== Players with most awards ===
Player	Editions	Notes
(Brazil) Marquinhos Vieira	3	2013, 2016, 2018
(Brazil) Lucas Dias	2	2023, 2024
(Brazil) Marcelinho Machado	2	2009, 2010

== NBB Finals MVP ==
The NBB Finals MVP is the MVP award of the final playoff series of the top professional basketball league in Brazil, the NBB. The award has been given out since the 2010–11 NBB season. In the 2018–19 season, the award started being sponsored by Budweiser and called Troféu Amaury Pasos de MVP Bud das Finais, in honor of legendary player and former FIBA Basketball World Cup MVP, Amaury Pasos.

Season	Player	Position	Nationality	Team	Ref.
2010–11	Guilherme Giovannoni	PF	Brazil	Brasília	
2011–12	Guilherme Giovannoni (2)	PF	Brazil	Brasília (2)	
2012–13	Caio Torres	C	Brazil	Flamengo	
2013–14	Jerome Meyinsse	C	United States	Flamengo (2)	
2014–15	Nicolás Laprovíttola	PG	Argentina	Flamengo (3)	
2015–16	Carlos Olivinha	PF	Brazil	Flamengo (4)	
2016–17	Alex Garcia	SG	Brazil	Bauru	
2017–18	Guilherme Hubner	C	Brazil	Paulistano	
2018–19	Carlos Olivinha (2)	PF	Brazil	Flamengo (5)	
2020–21	Yago dos Santos	PG	Brazil	Flamengo (6)	
2021–22	Lucas Dias	PF	Brazil	Franca	
2022–23	Georginho	SF	Brazil	Franca (2)	
2023–24	Lucas Dias (2)	PF	Brazil	Franca (3)	
2024–25	Didi Louzada	SG	Brazil	Franca (4)	

== NBB Defender of the Year ==
The NBB Defender of the Year is a New Basket Brazil award given since the 2009 NBB season to the top defensive player of the season. The winner of the award in all of the 6 times that it was given so far is the shooting guard Alex Garcia, who won the award six times. The award is given at the end of the season, at the wrap party of the championship, one day after the final game. Before the event, three candidates are announced and during the event the winner is chosen.

Season	Player	Position	Nationality	Team	Ref.
2009	Alex Garcia	SG	Brazil	Brasília	
2009–10	Alex Garcia (2)	SG	Brazil	Brasília (2)	
2010–11	Alex Garcia (3)	SG	Brazil	Brasília (3)	
2011–12	Alex Garcia (4)	SG	Brazil	Brasília (4)	
2012–13	Alex Garcia (5)	SG	Brazil	Brasília (5)	
2013–14	Alex Garcia (6)	SG	Brazil	Brasília (6)	
2014–15	Alex Garcia (7)	SG	Brazil	Bauru	
2015–16	Alex Garcia (8)	SG	Brazil	Bauru (2)	
2016–17	Jimmy de Oliveira	SG	Brazil	Mogi das Cruzes	
2017–18	Jimmy de Oliveira (2)	SG	Brazil	Mogi das Cruzes (2)	
2018–19	Jimmy de Oliveira (3)	SG	Brazil	Franca	
2019–20	Alex Garcia (9)	SG	Brazil	Minas	
2021–22	Corderro Bennett	PG	United States	São Paulo	
2022–23	Corderro Bennett (2)	PG	United States	São Paulo (2)	
2023–24	Dontrell Brite	PG	United States	Bauru (3)	
2024–25	Dontrell Brite (2)	PG	United States	Bauru (4)	

== NBB Sixth Man of the Year ==
The NBB Sixth Man of the Year is a New Basket Brazil award, given since the NBB 2009 to the most valuable substitute player, called sixth man. The award is given at the end of the season, at the wrap party of the championship, one day after the final game. Before the event, three candidates are announced and during the event the winner is chosen.

Season	Player	Position	Nationality	Team	Ref.
2009	Fred Santos	PG	Brazil	Flamengo	
2009–10	Nezinho dos Santos	PG	Brazil	Brasília	
2010–11	Vítor Benite	SG	Brazil	Franca	
2011–12	Paulinho Boracini	PG	Brazil	Pinheiros	
2012–13	Léo Meindl	SF	Brazil	Franca (2)	
2013–14	Hélio Lima	SG	Brazil	Limeira	
2014–15	Vítor Benite (2)	SG	Brazil	Flamengo (2)	
2015–16	Marcelinho Machado	SF	Brazil	Flamengo (3)	
2016–17	Arthur Pecos	PG	Brazil	Paulistano	
2017–18	Deryk Ramos	PG	Brazil	Paulistano (2)	
2018–19	Alexey Borges	PG	Brazil	Franca (3)	
2021–22	Gui Santos	G	Brazil	São Paulo	
2022–23	Santiago Scala	G	Argentina	Franca (4)	
2023–24	Matheus Eugeniusz	G	Brazil	Vasco da Gama	
2024–25	Gui Deodato	SF	Brazil	Flamengo (4)	

== NBB Most Improved Player ==
The NBB Most Improved Player is a New Basket Brazil award given since the 2009–10 to the most improved player of the season. The award is given at the end of the season, at the wrap party of the championship, one day after the final game. Before the event, three candidates are announced and during the event the winner is chosen.

Season	Player	Position	Nationality	Team	Ref.
2009–10	Audrei Parizotto	SG	Brazil	Joinville	
2010–11	Vítor Benite	SG	Brazil	Franca	
2011–12	Gui Deodato	SF	Brazil	Bauru	
2012–13	Gui Deodato (2)	SF	Brazil	Bauru (2)	
2013–14	Paulão Prestes	C	Brazil	Franca (2)	
2014–15	Davi Rossetto	PG	Brazil	Cearense	
2015–16	Deryk Ramos	PG	Brazil	Brasília	
2016–17	Georginho de Paula	PG	Brazil	Paulistano	
2017–18	Wesley Ferreira	PF	Brazil	Minas	
2018–19	Didi Louzada	SF	Brazil	Franca (3)	
2019–20	Georginho de Paula (2)	PG	Brazil	São Paulo	
2021–22	Gemadinha	G	Brazil	Pato	
2022–23	Antônio Ferreira	SF	Brazil	Unifacisa	
2023–24	Rafael Paulichi	PF	Brazil	Vasco da Gama	
2024–25	Daniel Von Haydin	G	Brazil	Brasília	

== NBB Revelation Player ==
The NBB Revelation Player is a New Basket Brazil award given since the 2009–10 NBB season to the player considered the greatest discovery of the season. Normally the award is given to player who attended the NBB Under-22, also called Liga de Desenvolvimento de Basquete, but this is not a rule. The first two awards were not given to players from NBB Under-22. The award is given at the end of the season, at the wrap party of the championship, one day after the final game. Before the event, three candidates are announced and during the event the winner is chosen.

Season	Player	Position	Nationality	Team	Ref.
2009–10	Raul Neto	PG	Brazil	Minas	
2010–11	Vítor Benite	SG	Brazil	Franca	
2011–12	Gui Deodato	SF	Brazil	Bauru	
2012–13	Ricardo Fischer	PG	Brazil	Bauru (2)	
2013–14	Henrique Coelho	PG	Brazil	Minas (2)	
2014–15	Deryk Ramos	PG	Brazil	Limeira	
2015–16	Lucas Dias	PF	Brazil	Pinheiros	
2016–17	Alexey Borges	PG	Brazil	Franca (2)	
2017–18	Gabriel Galvanini	SF/PF	Brazil	Bauru (3)	
2018–19	Didi Louzada	SF	Brazil	Franca (3)	
2019–20	Dikembe André	PF	Brazil	Paulistano	
2021–22	Mãozinha	F	Brazil	Fortaleza	
2022–23	Ruan Mirando	SF	Brazil	Cerrado	
2023–24	Márcio Santos	C	Brazil	Franca (4)	
2024–25	Wini Silva	F	Brazil	Minas (3)	

== NBB Best Foreign Player ==
Season	Player	Position	Nationality	Team	Ref.
2013–14	David Jackson	SG	United States	Limeira	
2014–15	David Jackson (2)	SG	United States	Limeira (2)	
2015–16	Shamell Stallworth	SF	United States	Mogi das Cruzes	
2016–17	Desmond Holloway	SG	United States	Pinheiros	
2017–18	Tyrone Curnell	PF	United States	Mogi das Cruzes (2)	
2018–19	Franco Balbi	PG	Argentina	Flamengo	
2019–20	David Jackson (3)	SG	United States	Minas	
2021–22	Shaq Johnson	F	United States	Minas (2)	
2022–23	Shaq Johnson (2)	F	United States	Minas (3)	
2023–24	Isaac Thorton	PG	United States	Botafogo	
2024–25	Dontrell Brite	PG	United States	Bauru	

== NBB "Craque da Galera" (Fan's Player of the Year) ==
Season	Player	Position	Nationality	Team	Ref.
2009	Marcelinho Machado	SF	Brazil	Flamengo	
2009–10	Marcelinho Machado (2)	SF	Brazil	Flamengo (2)	
2010–11	Chico Delben	PF	Brazil	Araraquara	

== All-NBB Team ==
#	Season	PG	SG	SF	PF	C
1	2009	(Brazil) / (United States) Larry Taylor (Bauru)	(Brazil) Alex Garcia (Brasília)	(Brazil) Marcelinho Machado (Flamengo)	(Brazil) Murilo Becker (Minas)	(Brazil) Rafael Araújo (Flamengo)
2	2009–10	(Brazil) Fúlvio de Assis (São José)	(Brazil) Alex Garcia (2) (Brasília)	(Brazil) Marcelinho Machado (2) (Flamengo)	(Brazil) Guilherme Giovannoni (Brasília)	(Brazil) Murilo Becker (2) (Minas)
3	2010–11	(Brazil) / (United States) Larry Taylor (2) (Bauru)	(Brazil) Alex Garcia (3) (Brasília)	(Brazil) Marquinhos Vieira (Pinheiros)	(Brazil) Guilherme Giovannoni (2) (Brasília)	(Brazil) Murilo Becker (3) (São José)
4	2011–12	(Brazil) Fúlvio de Assis (2) (São José)	(Brazil) Alex Garcia (4) (Brasília)	(Brazil) Marquinhos Vieira (2) (Pinheiros)	(Brazil) Guilherme Giovannoni (3) (Brasília)	(Brazil) Murilo Becker (4) (São José)
5	2012–13	(Brazil) Fúlvio de Assis (3) (São José)	(United States) Robert Day (Uberlândia)	(Brazil) Marquinhos Vieira (3) (Flamengo)	(Brazil) Rafa Mineiro (Pinheiros)	(Brazil) Caio Torres (Flamengo)
6	2013–14	(Argentina) Nicolás Laprovíttola (Flamengo)	(United States) David Jackson (Limeira)	(Brazil) Marquinhos Vieira (4) (Flamengo)	(Brazil) Jefferson William (São José)	(Brazil) Paulão Prestes (Franca)
7	2014–15	(Brazil) Ricardo Fischer (Bauru)	(Brazil) Alex Garcia (5) (Bauru)	(Brazil) Marquinhos Vieira (5) (Flamengo)	(Brazil) Guilherme Giovannoni (4) (Brasília)	(Brazil) Rafa Hettsheimeir (Bauru)
8	2015–16	(Brazil) Davi Rossetto (Basquete Cearense)	(Brazil) Alex Garcia (6) (Bauru)	(Brazil) Marquinhos Vieira (6) (Flamengo)	(Brazil) Rafa Hettsheimeir (2) (Bauru)	(Brazil) Caio Torres (2) (Paulistano)
9	2016–17	(Brazil) Fúlvio de Assis (4) (Brasília)	(Brazil) Alex Garcia (7) (Bauru)	(United States) Desmond Holloway (Pinheiros)	(Brazil) Jefferson William (2) (Bauru)	(Brazil) Lucas Mariano (Brasília)
10	2017–18	(Brazil) Elio Corazza (Paulistano)	(Brazil) Cauê Borges (Caxias do Sul)	(Brazil) Marquinhos Vieira (7) (Flamengo)	(United States) Tyrone Curnell (Mogi das Cruzes)	(Brazil) Rafa Hettsheimeir (3) (Bauru)
11	2018–19	(Argentina) Franco Balbi (Flamengo)	(United States) David Jackson (2) (Franca)	(Brazil) Marquinhos Vieira (8) (Flamengo)	(Brazil) Lucas Dias (Franca)	(Brazil) J.P. Batista (Mogi das Cruzes)
12	2019–20	(Brazil) Georginho de Paula (São Paulo)	(Brazil) André Góes (Mogi das Cruzes)	(Brazil) Marquinhos Vieira (9) (Flamengo)	(United States) Devon Scott (Minas)	(Brazil) Rafa Hettsheimeir (4) (Franca)
13	2020–21	(Brazil) Georginho de Paula (2) (São Paulo)	(United States) David Jackson (3) (Franca)	(Brazil) Marquinhos Vieira (10) (Flamengo)	(Brazil) Lucas Dias (2) (Franca)	(Brazil) Lucas Mariano (2) (São Paulo)
14	2021–22	(Brazil) Elinho (São Paulo)	(United States) Shaq Johnson (Minas)	(Brazil) Marquinhos Vieira (11) (São Paulo)	(Brazil) Lucas Mariano (3) (Franca)	(Brazil) Bruno Caboclo (São Paulo)
15	2022–23	(Brazil) Georginho de Paula (3) (São Paulo)	(United States) Shaq Johnson (2) (Minas)	(United States) David Jackson (4) (Franca)	(Brazil) Lucas Mariano (4) (Franca)	(Brazil) Lucas Dias (3) (Franca)
16	2023–24	(Brazil) Elinho (2) (Corinthians)	(Brazil) Gui Deodato (Flamengo)	(United States) Isaac Thorton (Botafogo)	(Brazil) Gabriel Jaú (Flamengo)	(Brazil) Lucas Dias (4) (Franca)
17	2024–25	(United States) Dontrell Brite (Bauru)	(United States) Shaq Johnson (3) (Flamengo)	(Brazil) Didi Louzada (Franca)	(Brazil) Ruan Miranda (Flamengo)	(Brazil) Lucas Dias (5) (Franca)

== NBB Ary Vidal Trophy Coach of the Year ==
The NBB Troféu Ary Vidal (NBB Ary Vidal Trophy) Coach of the Year is a New Basket Brazil award, given since the NBB 2009 to the best head coach of the season. The trophy given to the winner is called Ary Vidal Trophy, in a tribute to one of the greatest Brazilian coaches in history. Before the event, three candidates are announced and during the event the winner is chosen.

Season	Head Coach	Nationality	Team	Ref.
2009	Paulo Chupeta	Brazil	Flamengo	
2009–10	Lula Ferreira	Brazil	Brasília	
2010–11	Hélio Rubens	Brazil	Franca	
2011–12	Régis Marrelli	Brazil	São José	
2012–13	Lula Ferreira (2)	Brazil	Franca (2)	
2013–14	Gustavo de Conti	Brazil	Paulistano	
2014–15	Dedé Barbosa	Brazil	Limeira	
2015–16	José Neto	Brazil	Flamengo (2)	
2016–17	Gustavo de Conti (2)	Brazil	Paulistano (2)	
2017–18	Gustavo de Conti (3)	Brazil	Paulistano (3)	
2018–19	Léo Figueiró	Brazil	Botafogo	
2019–20	Jorge Guerrinha	Brazil	Mogi das Cruzes	
2021–22	Helinho	Brazil	Franca (3)	
2022–23	Helinho	Brazil	Franca (4)	
2023–24	Paulo César Jaú	Brazil	Bauru	
2024–25	Léo Costa	Brazil	Minas	
