= Lucas Mariano =

Brazilian basketball player (born 1993)

No. 28 – Franca
- Position: Power forward / center
- League: NBB; BCL Americas

Personal information
- Born: 24 September 1993 (age 33) Planaltina, Goiás, Brazil
- Listed height: 2.08 m (6 ft 10 in)
- Listed weight: 120 kg (265 lb)

Career information
- NBA draft: 2014: undrafted
- Playing career: 2009–present

Career history
- 2009–2015: Franca
- 2015–2016: Mogi das Cruzes
- 2016–2017: Lobos Brasília
- 2017–2018: Vasco da Gama
- 2018–2019: Bauru
- 2019–2020: Botafogo
- 2020–2021: São Paulo
- 2021–present: Franca

Career highlights
- BCL Americas champion (2023); BCL Americas MVP (2023); BCL Americas All-Star Five (2023); NBB champion (2022); Campeonato Paulista champion (2022); NBB Most Valuable Player (2021); 3× All-Brazilian League Team (2017, 2021, 2022); 4× Brazilian All-Star (2015, 2017, 2021, 2022)
Medals
Men's basketball
Representing Brazil
FIBA AmeriCup
Silver medal – second place	2022 Brazil
South American Championship
Silver medal – second place	2016 Caracas

Lucas Fernandes Mariano (born 24 September 1993) is a Brazilian basketball player who plays for Franca of the NBB.

== Youth career ==
Born in Planaltina, Lucas moved with his family to Franca when he was just five years old. Encouraged by his mother, a former professional athlete with passages through Brasília, Ponta Grossa and Franca, Lucas began his career in basketball at Escola Lance Livre, aged just seven. At age 11, he joined the ASPA (Association of Parents and Friends of Franca Basketball), which serves as the base for Franca.

== Professional career ==
In the first seasons for the professional team, Lucas had little time on the court, often not even leaving the bench. The situation changed in the 2012–13 season, when Lula Ferreira replaced Hélio Rubens in charge of the Franca team. Lula took on the challenge of renewing the group and betting on the base. Eventually, Mariano became one of the team's top players and one of Brazil's most promising young players.

Lucas faced major complications at the beginning of the following season in the middle of the quarterfinals of the Campeonato Paulista, he lost his younger brother, in the next game of the series Lucas was dismissed and his brother was honored with a minute of silence. The 2014–15 season marked Lucas' maturity in the Franca team. Alongside Léo Meindl, he led Franca to the semifinals in the Campeonato Paulista and fifth place in the 2014–15 NBB qualifying phase, guaranteeing a place for the club in the 2015 LSB champion.

Signed by Mogi das Cruzes for the 2015–16 season, Lucas was officially presented in July. Three months later, he played in his first final for Mogi, being defeated by São José and taking the vice-championship in Campeonato Paulista. Mogi would end up eliminated in the NBB Playoffs. After leaving Mogi das Cruzes, Mariano played for Lobos Brasília and he was considered at the time one of the best centers in the league. Later agreeing to play for Vasco da Gama, then Bauru and Botafogo.

According to the websites, Mariano's performance during the 2020-21 Novo Basquete Brasil season was the best of his career. Rightly, Lucas Mariano was named the league's MVP ahead of Georginho and Lucas Dias. Lucas averaged 19.8 points, 7.4 rebounds at 20.1 efficiency. During his MVP season, he mostly played the center position. With São Paulo, he became the league's vice champion. Lucas Mariano was also selected for the league's first team alongside Georginho, Lucas Dias, and Marquinhos and David Jackson.

After his return to Franca in 2021, in his first six games he was already his team's top scorer in the Campeonato Paulista and the second highest scorer in the competition, with an average of 20.3 points per game. He led his team to a 5-1 initial record with its sole loss to São Paulo. Mariano and his team would finish as champions in the 2021–22 NBB season.

In the 2022–23 season, Mariano won the Basketball Champions League Americas (BCLA) with Franca after defeating Flamengo in the final. Mariano was named the season's MVP.

== National team ==
He has been a member of the Brazilian national basketball team since he was young. Lucas was called up for Brazil team for the 2016 South American Basketball Championship, 2017 FIBA AmeriCup and 2022 FIBA AmeriCup, winning two silver medal with Brazil in the process.

== Career statistics ==
†	NBB championship

=== Regular season ===
Season	Team	GP	MPG	FG%	3PT%	FT%	RPG	APG	SPG	BPG	PPG
2009–10	Franca	2	1.1	.500	.000	.500	.5	.0	.5	.0	1.5
2010–11	Franca	3	2.5	.750	.000	.000	1.0	.0	.0	.3	2.0
2011–12	Franca	10	10.2	.677	.000	.833	2.0	.3	.5	.4	4.2
2012–13	Franca	34	22.5	.559	.000	.656	4.8	.3	.7	1.0	11.5
2013–14	Franca	31	29.4	.472	.347	.785	4.0	.8	.6	.9	13.2
2014–15	Franca	30	30.2	.499	.398	.485	5.8	.8	.7	.6	12.0
2015–16	Mogi das Cruzes	27	20.4	.468	.333	.649	4.3	.8	.7	.7	9.3
2016–17	Lobos Brasília	28	28.9	.532	.298	.658	6.4	1.0	.4	.6	18.0
2017–18	Vasco da Gama	27	22.6	.464	.294	.654	4.4	.9	.6	.6	11.2
2018–19	Bauru	25	29.2	.500	.311	.638	5.6	1.1	.8	.8	14.8
2019–20	Botafogo	26	25.7	.511	.425	.829	4.8	.9	.4	.8	15.6
2020–21	São Paulo	28	28.8	.510	.338	.759	6.6	1.0	.8	1.0	19.6
2021–22	Franca	32	28.3	.478	.357	.737	6.0	1.4	1.0	.7	19.6
Career		303	25.6	.501	.349	.679	5.0	.8	.6	.7	13.9

=== Playoffs ===
Season	Team	GP	MPG	FG%	3PT%	FT%	RPG	APG	SPG	BPG	PPG
2012	Franca	5	9.4	.606	.000	.667	1.6	.0	.2	.6	4.0
2013	Franca	8	26.6	.455	.000	.778	4.6	.9	.4	.6	8.3
2014	Franca	10	28.8	.464	.364	.714	3.5	.7	.0	.8	11.7
2015	Franca	10	32.5	.493	.375	.542	5.5	.8	.6	.8	13.4
2016	Mogi das Cruzes	12	23.3	.342	.250	.478	4.1	.7	.2	.9	7.8
2017	Lobos Brasília	4	35.6	.500	.556	.619	7.5	1.0	.8	.8	19.0
2018	Vasco da Gama	3	21.2	.655	.571	.727	5.0	1.7	.7	.3	12.7
2019	Bauru	6	30.6	.526	.344	.722	7.0	1.3	.3	1.5	16.7
2021	São Paulo	8	34.5	.476	.407	.750	10.3	1.3	.6	1.1	20.3
2022	Franca	11	29.1	.409	.308	.756	6.5	1.4	.8	.5	16.5
Career		77	27.8	.457	.346	.682	5.5	.9	.4	.8	12.8

=== Regular season ===
Season	Team	GP	MPG	FG%	3PT%	FT%	RPG	APG	SPG	BPG	PPG
2011	Franca	8	24.1	.648	.000	.625	5.8	.5	.5	.4	8.8
2012	Franca	7	25.6	.485	.000	.700	4.7	.3	1.0	1.7	9.1
2013	Franca	1	31.9	.441	.000	.500	9.0	3.0	.0	1.0	15.0
Career		16	25.3	.544	.000	.643	5.5	.6	.7	1.0	9.3

=== Playoffs ===
Season	Team	GP	MPG	FG%	3PT%	FT%	RPG	APG	SPG	BPG	PPG
2011	Franca	2	29.5	.500	.000	.571	4.0	.5	.5	1.0	11.0
2012	Franca	2	22.7	.477	.000	1.000	4.5	1.0	.0	1.0	10.5
Career		4	26.1	.489	.000	.625	4.3	.8	.3	1.0	10.8

== Personal ==
Mariano's mother was a professional basketball player, also for Franca, while his father was a handball player. He has two younger brothers, one who died and the other who plays for Franca's youth team.

He lost one of his younger brothers to drowning during the 2014-15 season, an event that deeply affected him.

Lucas admires NBA basketball player DeMarcus Cousins, even saying that their styles are alike.
