= Didi Louzada =

Brazilian basketball player (born 1999)

No. 0 – Sun Rockers Shibuya
- Position: Shooting guard / small forward
- League: B.League

Personal information
- Born: 2 July 1999 (age 27) Cachoeiro de Itapemirim, Brazil
- Listed height: 6 ft 5 in (1.96 m)
- Listed weight: 220 lb (100 kg)

Career information
- NBA draft: 2019: 2nd round, 35th overall pick
- Drafted by: Atlanta Hawks
- Playing career: 2017–present

Career history
- 2017–2019: Franca
- 2019–2021: Sydney Kings
- 2021–2022: New Orleans Pelicans
- 2022: →Birmingham Squadron
- 2022: Portland Trail Blazers
- 2022–2023: Cleveland Charge
- 2023–2024: Flamengo
- 2024–2025: Sesi Franca
- 2025-present: Sun Rockers Shibuya

Career highlights
- NBB Most Improved Player (2019); NBB Revelation Player (2019); NBB All-Star (2019); South American League champion (2018); LDB champion (2016)
- Stats at NBA.com
- Stats at Basketball Reference
Medals
Men's basketball
Representing Brazil
FIBA AmeriCup
| Silver medal – second place | 2022 Brazil |
FIBA South America U15 Championship
| Gold medal – first place | 2014 Venezuela |

Marcos Henrique "Didi" Louzada Silva (born 2 July 1999) is a Brazilian professional basketball player for Sesi Franca of the Novo Basquete Brasil (NBB). At the 2019 NBA draft, he was drafted by the Atlanta Hawks, before being traded to the New Orleans Pelicans.

== Early life ==
Louzada was born in Cachoeiro de Itapemirim in the Brazilian state of Espírito Santo. The first sport he played was futsal, but he decided to focus on basketball when he was 10 years old. Louzada saw immediate success playing basketball for his school and joined the Liga Urbana Social de Basquete (LUSB) at age seven. He moved to NBB club Franca in January 2015 and initially played for the under-16 team. After one season, he competed in the Liga de Desenvolvimento de Basquete (LDB), an under-22 league, and led his team to a championship. In August 2016, Louzada was one of 40 players invited to the National Basketball Association (NBA) Americas Team Camp in Mexico City.

== Professional career ==
=== Franca (2017–2019) ===
Louzada made his NBB debut for Franca on 16 February 2017, playing under two minutes in a 99–78 win over Pinheiros. On 26 January 2019, he recorded a career-high 27 points and six rebounds in a 100–70 victory over Nicaraguan club Real Estelí in the FIBA Americas League.

On 12 April 2019, Louzada played for the World Select Team at the Nike Hoop Summit in Portland, Oregon. On 19 April, he declared for the 2019 NBA draft. At the time, Silva was ranked by ESPN as the 61st-best prospect in the draft class. Silva was selected as the 35th pick of the 2019 NBA draft by the Atlanta Hawks. His draft rights were later traded to the New Orleans Pelicans.

=== Sydney Kings (2019–2021) ===
On 5 July 2019, Louzada signed with the Sydney Kings in the National Basketball League (NBL), a league based in Australia. Silva joined the team through the NBL Next Stars program, which was created in the previous year to attract NBA draft prospects to the NBL. He averaged 10.6 points, 3.5 rebounds and 1.6 assist per game. On 30 September 2020, Louzada re-signed with the team.

=== New Orleans Pelicans (2021–2022) ===
On 27 April 2021, Louzada signed with the New Orleans Pelicans. On 19 November, he was suspended for 25 games for violating the terms of the NBA's anti-drug program. On 21 January 2022, while playing in the NBA G League for the Birmingham Squadron, Louzada suffered a left knee injury. Two days later, the Pelicans announced that he was diagnosed with a torn medial meniscus in his left knee and would be ruled out indefinitely. On 4 February, he underwent surgery on his left knee.

=== Portland Trail Blazers (2022) ===
On 8 February 2022, the Portland Trail Blazers acquired Louzada, Nickeil Alexander-Walker, Tomáš Satoranský, Josh Hart, a protected 2022 first-round draft pick, the better of New Orleans' and Portland's 2026 second-round draft picks and New Orleans' 2027 second-round draft pick from the New Orleans Pelicans in exchange for CJ McCollum, Larry Nance Jr. and Tony Snell.

On August 29, 2022, Louzada was waived by the Blazers.

=== Cleveland Charge (2022–2023) ===
On October 24, 2022, Louzada joined the Cleveland Charge training camp roster.

=== Flamengo (2023–2024) ===
On June 29, 2023, Louzada signed with Flamengo of the Novo Basquete Brasil.

On June 13, 2024, Louzada was drafted by the Valley Suns in the 2024 NBA G League expansion draft.

== National team career ==
=== Junior national team ===
In 2014, Louzada joined the Brazilian national under-15 team at the FIBA South America Under-15 Championship in Barquisimeto, Venezuela. In five games, he averaged 4.2 points, 3.8 rebounds, and 1.4 assists per game, while winning the gold medal over Argentina. Louzada played for the Brazilian national under-16 team at the 2015 FIBA Americas Under-16 Championship in Bahía Blanca, Argentina. In five games, he averaged 6.6 points, 2.4 rebounds, and 0.6 assists per game, as Brazil finished in sixth place.

=== Senior national team ===
On 10 September 2018, Louzada was called up to play for the senior Brazilian national team in the second phase of 2019 FIBA World Cup qualification. He made his debut three days later, playing less than a minute in an 85–77 loss to Canada. On 21 February 2019, he scored 15 points in a 104–80 win over the Virgin Islands, helping Brazil qualify for the 2019 FIBA World Cup.

== Career statistics ==
Legend
| GP | Games played | GS | Games started | MPG | Minutes per game |
| FG% | Field goal percentage | 3P% | 3-point field goal percentage | FT% | Free throw percentage |
| RPG | Rebounds per game | APG | Assists per game | SPG | Steals per game |
| BPG | Blocks per game | PPG | Points per game | **Bold** | Career high |

=== NBA ===
==== Regular season ====
| Year | Team | GP | GS | MPG | FG% | 3P% | FT% | RPG | APG | SPG | BPG | PPG |
|---|---|---|---|---|---|---|---|---|---|---|---|---|
| 2020–21 | New Orleans | 3 | 0 | **18.7** | .231 | .250 | – | 1.0 | **1.0** | **.7** | .0 | 2.7 |
| 2021–22 | New Orleans | 2 | 0 | 3.5 | .000 | .000 | – | 1.0 | .5 | .0 | .0 | .0 |
| 2021–22 | Portland | **7** | **1** | 17.4 | **.400** | **.450** | 1.000 | **2.1** | .6 | .3 | **.3** | **5.0** |
| Career | | 12 | 1 | 15.4 | .326 | .355 | 1.000 | 1.7 | .7 | .3 | .2 | 3.6 |

=== NBB ===
==== Regular season ====
| Season | Team | GP | MPG | 2P% | 3P% | FT% | RPG | APG | SPG | BPG | PPG |
|---|---|---|---|---|---|---|---|---|---|---|---|
| 2016–17 | Franca | 1 | 1.8 | .000 | .000 | .000 | 0 | 0 | 0 | 0 | 0 |
| 2017–18 | Franca | 21 | 10.8 | .441 | .259 | .667 | 1.5 | .6 | **.6** | **.1** | 3.2 |
| 2018–19 | Franca | **22** | **20.3** | **.459** | **.347** | **.746** | **2.9** | **1.2** | **.6** | .0 | **10.6** |
| Career | | 44 | 15.4 | .455 | .324 | .734 | 2.2 | .9 | .6 | .1 | 6.8 |

==== Playoffs ====
| Season | Team | GP | MPG | 2P% | 3P% | FT% | RPG | APG | SPG | BPG | PPG |
|---|---|---|---|---|---|---|---|---|---|---|---|
| 2018 | Franca | 3 | 8.8 | .333 | .400 | .000 | 1.3 | **.7** | .0 | .0 | 2.7 |
| 2019 | Franca | **11** | **16.4** | **.460** | **.414** | **.765** | **2.7** | .5 | **.5** | **.2** | **7.7** |
| Career | | 14 | 14.7 | .423 | .412 | .765 | 2.4 | .6 | .5 | .2 | 6.6 |

== See also ==
- List of people banned or suspended by the NBA
