= Helinho (basketball) =

Brazilian basketball coach and player (born 1975)

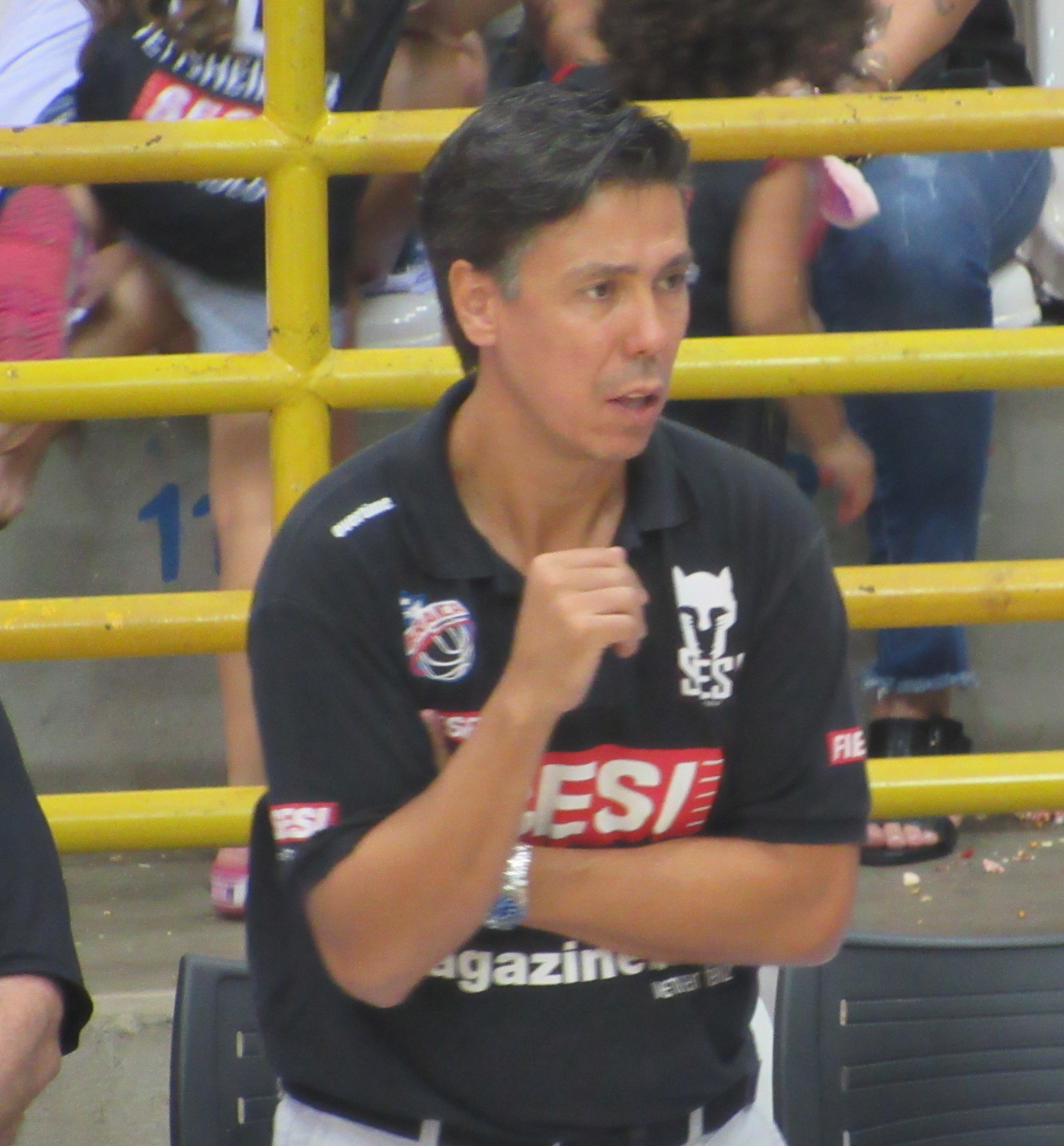
- Helinho coaching for Franca in 2019

Franca
- League: Novo Basquete Brasil; BCL Americas

Personal information
- Born: 12 May 1975 (age 51) São Paulo, Brazil
- Listed height: 1.83 m (6 ft 0 in)
- Position: Point guard
- Coaching career: 2016–present

Career history

Playing
- -2000: Franca
- 2001-2002: Vasco da Gama
- 2003-2005: Unitri/Uberlândia
- 2006-2012: Franca
- 2013-2014: Unitri/Uberlândia
- 2014-2015: Franca

Coaching
- 2016-present: Franca

Career highlights
- As player: 5× Brazilian Championship champion (1997-1999, 2001, 2002, 2004); São Paulo State Championship winner (2006); As head coach: FIBA Intercontinental Cup champion (2023); Champions League Americas champion (2023); LSB champion (2018); 2× NBB champion (2022, 2023); Copa Super 8 winner (2022); 4× São Paulo State Championship winner (2018, 2019, 2021, 2022); 2× NBB Coach of the Year (2022, 2023)

Hélio Rubens Garcia Filho (born 12 May 1975), commonly known as Helinho, is a Brazilian basketball coach and former player. Helinho is the current head coach of Franca. He is the son of Hélio Rubens Garcia, who was also a basketball coach and player.

During his playing career, Helinho was a point guard and played for the Brazil national team, and played at the World Cup in 1998 and 2002. Helinho played for Franca, Vasco da Gama and Uberlândia and won five national championships.

Helinho took over Franca as head coach in 2016, and since then has won two NBB championships, the BCL Americas in 2023, and the FIBA Intercontinental Cup in 2023. He is also an assistant for the Brazil national team.

== Honours ==
=== As coach ===
Franca

- FIBA Intercontinental Cup: 2023
- Basketball Champions League Americas: 2022–23
- Liga Sudamericana de Básquetbol: 2018
- Novo Basquete Brasil: 2021–22, 2022–23
- Copa Super 8: 2022-23
- Campeonato Paulista: 2018, 2019, 2020, 2022
