= Murilo Becker =

Brazilian basketball player (born 1983)

Personal information
- Born: July 14, 1983 (age 43) Farroupilha, Brazil
- Listed height: 6 ft 11 in (2.11 m)
- Listed weight: 255 lb (116 kg)

Career information
- NBA draft: 2005: undrafted
- Playing career: 2000–2020
- Position: Power forward / center

Career history
- 2000–2003: Bauru
- 2003–2004: FMU São Paulo
- 2004–2005: Ribeirão Preto
- 2005–2007: Franca
- 2007: Maccabi Tel Aviv
- 2007–2008: → Lukoil Academic
- 2008–2010: Minas
- 2010–2013: São José
- 2013–2016: Bauru
- 2016–2017: Vasco da Gama
- 2017–2018: Vitória
- 2018–2019: Botafogo
- 2019–2020: São Paulo FC

Career highlights
- FIBA Americas League champion (2015); FIBA South American League champion (2014); Brazilian champion (2002); Brazilian League MVP (2012); 4× All-Brazilian League Team (2009–2012); 5× Brazilian All-Star (2009–2012, 2014); Brazilian All-Star Game MVP (2012); Brazilian All-Star Skills Challenge champion (2018)
Medals
Men's basketball
Representing Brazil
FIBA AmeriCup
Gold medal – first place	2005 Santo Domingo
Pan American Games
Gold medal – first place	2003 Rio de Janeiro
Gold medal – first place	2007 Rio de Janeiro
FIBA South American Championship
Gold medal – first place	2006 Caracas
Gold medal – first place	2010 Neiva

Murilo Becker Da Rosa (born July 14, 1983, in Farroupilha) is a Brazilian former professional basketball player.

== Professional career ==
Becker was eligible for the 2005 NBA draft, but he was not drafted.

During his pro club career, Becker has played with the Brazilian League club Bauru.

== National team career ==
Becker has been a member of the senior Brazilian national basketball team. With Brazil, he played at the following tournaments: the 2003 FIBA AmeriCup, the 2005 FIBA AmeriCup, the 2006 FIBA World Cup, the 2007 FIBA AmeriCup, and the 2010 FIBA World Cup.
