= Yago dos Santos =

Brazilian basketball player (born 1999)

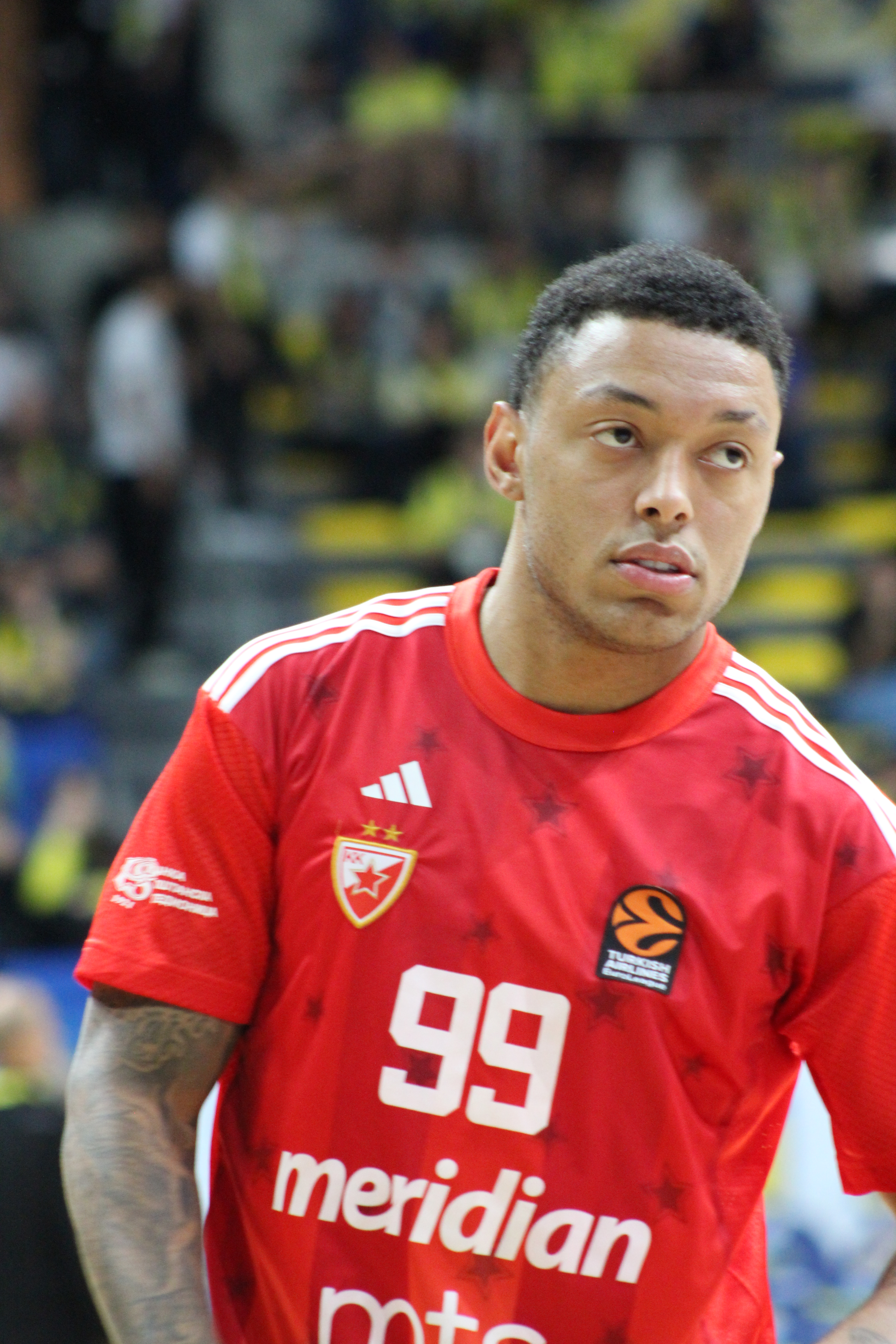
- dos Santos with Crvena zvezda in 2024

No. 99 – Flamengo
- Position: Point guard
- League: NBB; BCLA

Personal information
- Born: March 9, 1999 (age 27) Tupã, São Paulo, Brazil
- Listed height: 1.73 m (5 ft 8 in)
- Listed weight: 80 kg (176 lb)

Career information
- NBA draft: 2019: undrafted
- Playing career: 2016–present

Career history
- 2016–2020: Paulistano
- 2020–2022: Flamengo
- 2022–2023: Ratiopharm Ulm
- 2023–2026: Crvena zvezda
- 2026: Virtus Bologna
- 2026–present: Flamengo

Career highlights
- FIBA Intercontinental Cup champion (2022); FIBA Champions League Americas champion (2021); ABA League champion (2024); 2× NBB champion (2018, 2021); Bundesliga champion (2023); Serbian League champion (2024); 2× Serbian Cup winner (2024, 2025); NBB Finals MVP (2021); Bundesliga Finals MVP (2023); All-Bundesliga First Team (2023); ABA League Finals MVP (2024); FIBA AmeriCup MVP (2025)
Medals
Men's basketball
Representing Brazil
FIBA AmeriCup
Gold medal – first place	2025 Managua
Silver medal – second place	2022 Brazil

Yago Mateus dos Santos (born March 9, 1999), known simply as Yago, is a Brazilian professional basketball player for Flamengo of the Novo Basquete Brasil (NBB). Dos Santos was discovered by Palmeiras, and played for Paulistano from 2016 to 2020 and Flamengo from 2020 to 2022 before moving to German club Ratiopharm Ulm. He has also played for the Chicago Bulls in the 2023 NBA Summer League team. Yago won the 2023 German BBL championship with Ulm, while being named Finals MVP as well.

ESPN and ESporte called him one of the greatest revelations of Brazilian basketball of the 2010s.

== Professional career ==
From 2020 to 2022, Yago played two seasons with Flamengo, with whom he won the 2022 FIBA Intercontinental Cup, as well as two NBB championships.

On July 20, 2022, Yago signed a two-year contract with German club Ratiopharm Ulm of the German Basketball Bundesliga. He was instrumental in helping Ulm win its first ever German championship in 2023 and received Bundesliga Finals MVP honours. Appearing in 45 Bundesliga games (45 starts) during the 2022-23 campaign, he averaged a team-high 15.0 points per contest to go along with 5.7 assists and 2.7 rebounds a game.

On July 17, 2023, Yago signed a three-year contract with Serbian powerhouse KK Crvena zvezda Meridianbet. In the same season, main rivals KK Partizan also signed Brazilian Bruno Caboclo, making the Serbian derby also a derby between two of Brazil's best players. On June 28, 2024, Yago extended his contract with the Serbian club through 2027.

On April 10, 2026, dos Santos signed for Virtus Bologna of the Italian LBA and the EuroLeague until the end of the season after parting ways with Crvena zvezda.

== National team career ==
During the 2023 FIBA World Cup, he recorded a double-double (24 points, 11 assists, 6-6 from three point range) against Ivory Coast, which earned him worldwide praise.

== Career statistics ==
Legend
GP	Games played	GS	Games started	MPG	Minutes per game
FG%	Field-goal percentage	3P%	3-point field-goal percentage	FT%	Free-throw percentage
RPG	Rebounds per game	APG	Assists per game	SPG	Steals per game
BPG	Blocks per game	PPG	Points per game	PIR	Performance index rating
**Bold**	Career high

=== EuroLeague ===
Year	Team	GP	GS	MPG	FG%	3P%	FT%	RPG	APG	SPG	BPG	PPG	PIR
2023–24	Crvena zvezda	28	**16**	**19.8**	**.435**	**.402**	.807	**2.0**	**3.9**	**.5**	—	**8.7**	**9.1**
2024–25	Crvena zvezda	**35**	1	16.2	.390	.391	.815	1.6	3.3	**.5**	—	6.3	7.5
2025–26	Crvena zvezda	25	0	10.7	.231	.208	**.889**	.8	2.2	.2	—	2.6	1.5
Career		88	17	15.8	.380	.353	.822	1.5	3.2	.4	—	6.0	6.3

=== EuroCup ===
Year	Team	GP	GS	MPG	FG%	3P%	FT%	RPG	APG	SPG	BPG	PPG	PIR
2022–23	ratiopharm Ulm	20	20	26.1	.427	.391	.887	3.0	6.1	.7	.1	13.0	17.6
Career		20	20	26.1	.427	.391	.887	3.0	6.1	.7	.1	13.0	17.6

=== Basketball Champions League Americas ===
Year	Team	GP	GS	MPG	FG%	3P%	FT%	RPG	APG	SPG	BPG	PPG
2019–20	Flamengo	1	0	15.7	**.500**	.000	**.833**	3.0	1.0	—	—	7.0
2020–21	Flamengo	6	4	22.6	.340	.256	.800	2.2	**6.0**	.7	—	9.0
2021–22	Flamengo	**7**	**5**	**22.8**	.475	**.500**	.762	**3.3**	5.3	**1.1**	—	**13.7**
Career		14	9	22.1	.414	.381	.784	2.8	5.3	.9	—	11.2

=== FIBA Americas League ===
Year	Team	GP	GS	MPG	FG%	3P%	FT%	RPG	APG	SPG	BPG	PPG
2017–18	Paulistano	3	0	15.9	**.450**	.444	.667	3.0	2.0	.3	—	8.7
2018–19	Paulistano	**8**	**8**	**25.4**	.411	**.457**	**.852**	**4.1**	**5.7**	**1.2**	—	**17.6**
Career		11	8	22.7	.419	.455	.818	3.8	4.7	1.0	—	11.8

=== Domestic leagues ===
Year	Team	League	GP	MPG	FG%	3P%	FT%	RPG	APG	SPG	BPG	PPG
2016–17	(Brazil) Paulistano	NBB	30	11.1	.350	.361	.803	.9	1.7	.4	—	6.3
2017–18	(Brazil) Paulistano	NBB	39	15.7	.415	.341	.800	2.1	3.0	.5	—	8.6
2018–19	(Brazil) Paulistano	NBB	26	27.4	.429	.370	.862	3.6	4.8	.8	—	13.2
2019–20	(Brazil) Paulistano	NBB	25	31.8	.404	.368	.841	3.0	5.4	1.0	.0	16.0
2020–21	(Brazil) Flamengo	NBB	37	25.6	.444	.368	.842	3.0	5.9	.9	.0	11.5
2021–22	(Brazil) Flamengo	NBB	41	27.5	.427	.366	.823	3.9	5.8	.9	.1	12.8
2022–23	(Germany) ratiopharm Ulm	BBL	45	26.5	.427	.383	.815	3.5	5.6	.7	.0	15.0
2023–24	(Serbia) Crvena zvezda	KLS	3	25.5	.704	.684	1.000	2.7	7.0	.3	—	19.7
2023–24	(Serbia) Crvena zvezda	ABA	31	21.7	.464	.385	.859	2.5	4.3	.5	.0	10.7
