= 2021–22 NBB season =

- League: Novo Basquete Brasil
- Sport: Basketball
- Duration: 23 October 2021 – 9 June 2022
- Number of teams: 17
- TV partner(s): ESPN Brasil; TV Cultura

Regular season
- Top seed: Franca
- Season MVP: Bruno Caboclo (São Paulo)
- Top scorer: Lucas Mariano (Franca)

Playoffs
- Finals champions: Franca (12th national title)
- Runners-up: Flamengo
- Finals MVP: Lucas Dias (Franca)

Seasons
- ← 2020–21 2022–23 →

The 2021–22 NBB season was the 14th season of the Novo Basquete Brasil (NBB), the highest level basketball league in Brazil.

Franca won the championship after a 13-year drought, adding to its record of 12 Brazilian national championship.

== Team changes ==
Campo Mourão withdrew from the league. União Corinthians made its NBB debut and returned to the highest national level after a 19-year absence. Rio Claro also returned to the league this season.

== Regular season ==
Quarterfinals
Eightfinals

Pos	2021–22 NBB regular season										
Pos	Team	Pld	W	L	PCT	Pts	Home	Away	PF	PA	PP
1	Franca	32	29	3	90.6%	61	16-0	13-3	2889	2456	+433
2	Flamengo	32	26	6	81.3%	58	15-1	11-5	2837	2356	481
3	Minas	32	25	7	78.1%	57	14-2	11-5	2691	2446	+245
4	São Paulo FC	32	23	9	71.9%	55	13-3	10-6	2660	2402	+258
5	Bauru	32	21	11	65.6%	53	13-3	8-8	2520	2459	+61
6	Unifacisa	32	20	12	62.5%	52	11-5	9-7	2428	2344	+84
7	Paulistano	32	17	15	53.1%	49	11-5	6-10	2477	2474	+3
8	Pinheiros	32	15	17	46.9%	47	9-7	6-10	2574	2576	-2
9	Corinthians	32	13	19	40.6%	45	8-8	5-11	2420	2403	+17
10	Rio Claro	32	13	19	40.6%	45	10-6	3-13	2276	2394	-118
11	Caxias do Sul	32	12	20	37.5%	44	7-9	5-11	2263	2470	-207
12	Pato Basquete	32	12	20	37.5%	44	6-10	6-10	2336	2516	-18
13	Mogi das Cruzes	32	11	21	34.4%	43	8-8	3-13	2459	2652	-193
14	Fortaleza/Basquete Cearense	32	10	22	31.3%	42	8-8	2-14	2338	2564	-226
15	Cerrado	32	10	22	31.3%	42	4-12	6-10	2487	2642	-155
16	União Corinthians	32	8	24	25.0%	40	7-9	1-15	2384	2667	-283
17	Brasília Basquete	32	7	25	21.9%	39	4-12	3-13	2392	2610	-218

Source: NBB

== Playoffs ==
Eightfinals
8.º	Pinheiros	2
9.º	Corinthians	0
5.º	Bauru	2
12.º	Pato Basquete	1
7.º	Paulistano	2
10.º	Rio Claro	1
6.º	Unifacisa	2
11.º	Caxias do Sul	0

Quarterfinals
1.º	Franca	3
8.º	Pinheiros	0
4.º	São Paulo	3
5.º	Bauru	0
2.º	Flamengo	3
7.º	Paulistano	0
3.º	Minas	3
6.º	Unifacisa	1

Semifinals
1.º	Franca	3
4.º	São Paulo	1
2.º	Flamengo	3
3.º	Minas	0

Finals
1.º	Franca	3
2.º	Flamengo	1

== Statistics ==
=== Individual statistical leaders ===
Leaders after the regular season.

Category	Player	Team(s)	Statistic
Points per game	Lucas Mariano	Franca	18.8
Rebounds per game	Mãozinha	Fortaleza/Basquete Cearense	9.6
Assists per game	Elinho	São Paulo	6.3
Blocks per game	Dontrell Brite	Baura	1.7
Blocks per game	Bruno Caboclo	São Paulo	2.5
Efficiency per game	Georginho	Franca	21.4
