= Alex Garcia (basketball) =

Brazilian basketball player (born 1980)

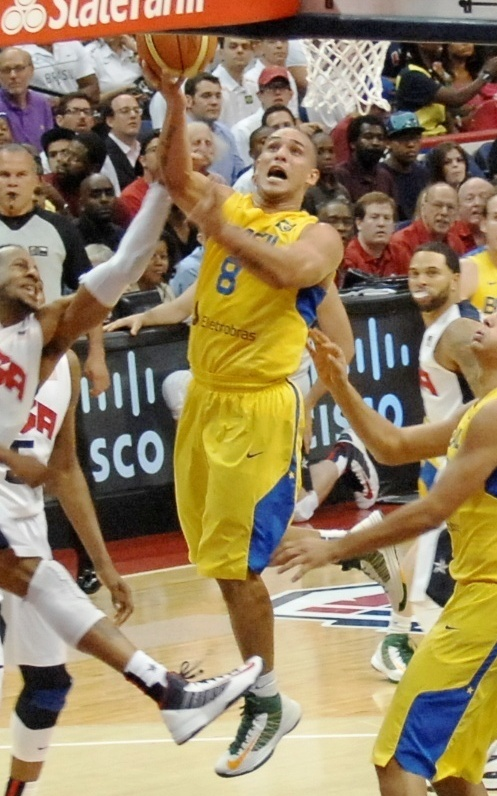
- Garcia with the Brazil men's national basketball team in 2012

No. 10 – Bauru
- Position: Shooting guard / small forward
- League: NBB

Personal information
- Born: 4 March 1980 (age 46) Orlândia, Brazil
- Listed height: 6 ft 3 in (1.91 m)
- Listed weight: 225 lb (102 kg)

Career information
- NBA draft: 2002: undrafted
- Playing career: 1999–present

Career history
- 1999–2003: COC Ribeirão Preto
- 2003–2004: San Antonio Spurs
- 2004: New Orleans Hornets
- 2005–2006: COC Ribeirão Preto
- 2006–2007: Brasília
- 2007–2008: Maccabi Tel Aviv
- 2008: Pinheiros
- 2008–2014: Brasilia
- 2014–2019: Bauru
- 2019–2020: Minas
- 2020–present: Bauru

Career highlights
- 2× FIBA Americas League champion (2009, 2015); 2× FIBA Americas League Grand Finals MVP (2009, 2015); 2× FIBA South American League champion (2010, 2014); FIBA South American League MVP (2014); 6× Brazilian champion (2003, 2007, 2010–2012, 2017); Brazilian League MVP (2015); Brazilian League Finals MVP (2017); 7× All-Brazilian League Team (2009–2012, 2015–2017); 9× Brazilian League Defender of the Year (2009–2016, 2020); 15× Brazilian All-Star (2009–2015, 2017–2019, 2021-2024); 2× Brazilian All-Star Game MVP (2013, 2014); NBB Forward of the Year (2003); NBB Guard of the Year (2007); NBB Domestic Player of the Year (2003); 6× All-NBB First Team (2003, 2010–2012, 2016, 2017)
- Stats at NBA.com
- Stats at Basketball Reference
Medals
Men's basketball
Representing Brazil
FIBA AmeriCup
Gold medal – first place	2009 Puerto Rico
Silver medal – second place	2001 Neuquén
Silver medal – second place	2011 Mar del Plata
FIBA South American Championship
Gold medal – first place	2003 Montevideo
Pan American Games
Gold medal – first place	2003 Santo Domingo
Gold medal – first place	2007 Rio de Janeiro

Alex Ribeiro Garcia, commonly known as either Alex Garcia, or simply as Alex (born 4 March 1980) is a Brazilian professional basketball player. He also represented the senior Brazilian national team. He is a 6-foot-3-inch (1.91 m) 225 pounds (102 kg) shooting guard-small forward.

== Professional career ==
Garcia has served two stints in the National Basketball Association as a member of the San Antonio Spurs (2003–04) and New Orleans Hornets (2004–05). He holds NBA career averages of 4.7 points per game and 1.8 assists per game. Garcia was promptly waived by the hornets after suffering an anterior cruciate ligament injury vs. the Washington Wizards on December 12, 2004.

This game with the ACL tear ended up being Garcia's final NBA game ever, as he spent the rest of his professional basketball career playing overseas. In that final game against the Wizards, Garcia recorded 6 points, 1 rebound and 2 steals as the Hornets lost the game 69 - 88.

Garcia has also played with UniCEUB/BRB and several other clubs of the top-tier level Brazilian League.

== National team career ==
Garcia has been a member of the senior men's Brazilian national basketball team. With Brazil, he has played at the following major tournaments: the 2002 FIBA World Cup, the 2003 FIBA AmeriCup, the 2005 FIBA AmeriCup, the 2006 FIBA World Cup, the 2007 FIBA AmeriCup, the 2009 FIBA AmeriCup, the 2010 FIBA World Cup, the 2011 FIBA AmeriCup, the 2012 Summer Olympics, the 2013 FIBA AmeriCup, the 2014 FIBA World Cup, and the 2016 Summer Olympics.

== Awards and accomplishments ==
=== Titles ===
- 2× FIBA Americas League Champion: (2009, 2015)
- 2× FIBA South American League Champion: (2010, 2014)
- 6× Brazilian Championship Champion: (2003, 2007, 2010, 2011, 2012, 2017)

=== Individual awards ===
- 2× FIBA Americas League Grand Finals MVP: (2009, 2015)
- 7× All-Brazilian League Team: (2009, 2010, 2011, 2012, 2015, 2016, 2017)
- 9× Brazilian League Defender of the Year: (2009, 2010, 2011, 2012, 2013, 2014, 2015, 2016, 2020)
- FIBA South American League MVP: (2014)
- Brazilian League MVP: (2015)
- Brazilian League Finals MVP: (2017)

== Career statistics ==
=== Regular seasons ===
Season	Team	League	GP	MPG	FG%	3PT FG%	FT%	RPG	APG	SPG	BPG	PPG
1999–00	COC Ribeirão Preto	BBL	21	25.5	.620	.344	.700	3.9	2.0	1.5	.2	13.0
2000–01	COC Ribeirão Preto	BBL	30	29.2	.714	.372	.766	4.0	3.4	1.6	.6	17.3
2001–02	COC Ribeirão Preto	BBL	32	23.6	.625	.253	.726	3.9	2.1	2.2	.4	10.9
2002–03†	COC Ribeirão Preto	BBL	32	31.5	.635	.359	.855	4.4	4.4	1.9	.7	17.6
2003–04	San Antonio	NBA	2	6.5	.143	-	.500	0.0	0.0	1.0	.0	1.5
2004–05	New Orleans	NBA	8	18.3	.346	.278	.750	1.9	2.3	0.5	.1	5.5
NBA Totals			10	15.9	.322	.278	.667	1.5	1.8	.6	.1	4.7
2005–06	COC Ribeirão Preto	BBL	15	32.3	.627	.338	.781	4.5	5.0	2.8	.8	21.0
2006–07†	Brasília	BBL	19	29.8	.625	.420	.694	4.4	3.0	2.4	.6	20.3
2007–08	Maccabi Tel Aviv	ISBL	26	16.3	.677	.327	.697	1.9	1.3	.9	.2	7.0
2008–09	Brasilia	NBB	27	30.9	.486	.288	.740	4.9	2.7	1.2	.7	18.7
2009–10†	Brasilia	NBB	22	32.8	.489	.343	.829	5.3	3.3	1.2	.7	16.5
2010–11†	Brasilia	NBB	28	34.1	.501	.350	.827	5.0	3.6	1.9	.6	17.6
2011–12†	Brasilia	NBB	26	32.3	.532	.279	.826	5.2	3.5	1.8	.6	17.7
2012–13	Brasilia	NBB	28	31.7	.462	.306	.761	4.5	3.9	1.6	.6	14.3
2013–14	Brasilia	NBB	23	30.0	.536	.292	.826	5.9	3.4	1.4	.7	17.2
2014–15	Bauru	NBB	28	30.0	.561	.463	.813	5.5	4.1	.9	.5	14.5

=== Playoffs ===
Season	Team	League	GP	MPG	FG%	3PT FG%	FT%	RPG	APG	SPG	BPG	PPG
2001	COC Ribeirão Preto	BBL	11	25.9	.655	.394	.727	3.0	3.3	1.2	.3	13.4
2002	COC Ribeirão Preto	BBL	7	17.3	.637	.300	.824	3.4	2.4	1.9	.3	9.3
2003†	COC Ribeirão Preto	BBL	11	31.3	.612	.424	.845	3.0	2.9	2.6	1.0	18.7
2006	COC Ribeirão Preto	BBL	13	35.1	.575	.317	.728	5.5	5.7	2.2	.5	18.8
2007†	Universo/BRB/DF	BBL	11	33.1	.643	.250	.820	5.0	3.3	2.5	.5	16.9
BBL Totals			53	29.6	.621	.339	.784	4.1	3.7	2.1	.5	16.0
2008	Maccabi Tel Aviv	ISBL	2	18.5	.500	.000	1.000	3.5	1.0	1.5	.5	7.0
Ligat HaAl Totals			2	18.5	.500	.00	1.000	3.5	1.0	1.5	.5	7.0
2009	Brasilia	NBB	14	35.2	.483	.336	.739	6.2	2.4	1.5	.7	20.9
2010†	Brasilia	NBB	13	35.0	.497	.345	.770	6.1	4.0	1.1	1.1	16.6
2011†	Brasilia	NBB	13	35.5	.494	.224	.798	4.4	3.5	1.5	.6	15.1
2012†	Brasilia	NBB	9	35.6	.559	.395	.897	5.0	3.7	1.8	.3	17.9
2013	Brasilia	NBB	5	32.5	.449	.269	.800	5.4	2.0	1.2	.4	12.2
2014	Brasilia	NBB	3	37.7	.692	.500	.900	5.0	4.0	2.0	1.0	24.0
2015	Bauru	NBB	12	34.3	.455	.295	.796	5.6	4.3	1.0	.6	13.8
NBB Totals			69	35.1	.500	.322	.794	5.4	3.4	1.4	.7	16.9
