= São Paulo FC (basketball) =

Brazilian basketball team

- Nickname: Tricolor
- Leagues: Novo Basquete Brasil; Paulista Masculino
- Founded: 1930 (basketball section)
- History: São Paulo FC; 1930–present
- Arena: Ginásio do Morumbi
- Capacity: 1,918
- Location: São Paulo, Brazil
- President: Júlio César Casares
- Championships: 1 BCL Americas; 1 Campeonato Paulista
- Website: saopaulof.net
Home	Away

São Paulo FC is the basketball section of the São Paulo FC club, based in São Paulo, Brazil. The men's first team plays professionally in the Novo Basquete Brasil (NBB).

Home games are played at the Multisport Gym Doctor Antônio Leme Nunes Galvão, which has a capacity for 1,900 people. The club was inactive for a long time but it resumed operations in November 2018, starting competing in the second-tier LOB for the 2018–19 season. After a second-place finish promotion to the top-level NBB was secured.

In 2022, São Paulo made its debut in the BCL Americas, the top tier panamerican competition and won its first-ever continental title after defeating Club Biguá in the Final.

The club withdrew from 2025-26 season due to financial issues.

== Honours ==
=== Domestic competitions ===
- Brazilian Championship (NBB):
  - Runners-up (2): 2020–21, 2022–23
- Super 8:
  - Runners-up (2): 2020–21, 2021–22
- Liga Ouro de Basquete:
  - Runners-up (1): 2019
- Campeonato Paulista:
  - Winners (1): 2021
  - Runners-up (1): 2022
- Campeonato Paulistano:
  - Winners (1): 1943

=== International competitions ===
- BCL Americas:
  - Winners (1): 2021–22
  - Fourth place (1): 2020–21
- FIBA Intercontinental Cup:
  - Runners-up (1): 2023

== Players ==
=== Notable players ===
- Set a club record or won an individual award as a professional player.
- Played at least one official international match for his senior national team at any time.

- (Brazil) Bruno Caboclo
- (Brazil) Henrique Coelho
- (Brazil) Isaac Gonçalves
- (Brazil) Lucas Mariano
- (Brazil) Marquinhos

== Coaches ==
- Cláudio Mortari (2018–2021)
- Bruno Mortari (2021–2024)
- Guerrinha (2024–2025)
- Fabricio Fernandes (2025)

== Performance in international competitions ==
Since their return to professional basketball in 2018, São Paulo has played in FIBA Americas administered competitions three times. The club's best performance was in the 2021-22 season, when they won the BCL Americas after going unbeaten in the competition with 9 wins and no losses.

Key:

- GP: Games played
- W: Wins
- L: Losses

Season	Tier	League	Result	GP	W	L
2021	1	BCL Americas	Fourth Place	7	3	4
2021–22	1	BCL Americas	Champions	9	9	0
2022	2	Liga Sudamericana de Básquetbol	Quarter-finalist	5	2	3
2023–24	1	BCL Americas	First stage	6	3	3
Overall	4 appearances			27	17	10

== Performance in NBB ==
Following is the seasons of São Paulo FC in the Novo Basquete Brasil:

Season	Pos.	Postseason	GP	W	L	PCT	Home	Away	PF	PA	PD	Playoffs
2019-20	3rd	Quarterfinals	26	20	6	76.9	8–5	12–1	2302	2122	+180	Cancelled due to COVID-19 pandemic
2020-21	3rd	Runners-up	30	23	7	76.7	12–3	11–4	2705	2324	+381	QF 2–0 vs. Corinthians, SF 3–0 vs. Minas, F 0–3 vs. Flamengo
2021-22	4th	Semifinals	32	23	9	71.9	13–3	10–6	2660	2402	+258	QF 3–0 vs. Bauru, SF 1–3 vs. Franca
2022-23	3rd	Runners-up	32	22	10	68.8	12–4	10–6	2739	2548	+191	QF 3–1 vs. Pinheiros, SF 3–0 vs. Flamengo, F 2–3 vs. Franca
2023-24	11th	Quarterfinals	36	18	18	50.0	10–8	8–10	2824	2849	-25	R16 2–1 vs. Unifacisa, QF 2–3 vs. Minas
2024-25	13th	Quarterfinals	34	13	21	38.2	9–8	4–13	2596	2710	-114	R16 3–1 vs. Brasília, QF 0–3 vs. Bauru

== See also ==
- São Paulo FC
- São Paulo FC (women)
- São Paulo FC (futsal)
