= Georginho =

Brazilian basketball player

George de Paula
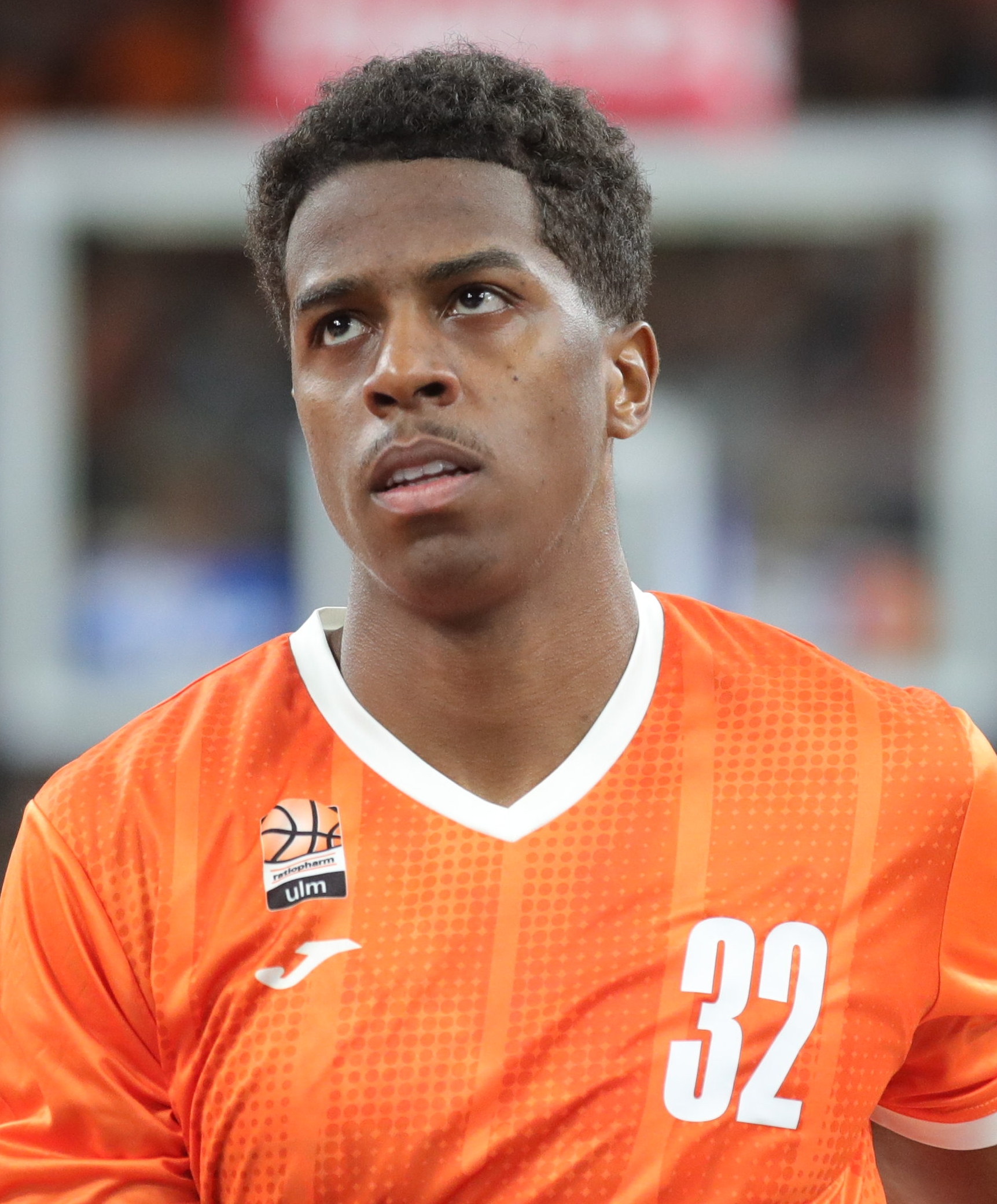
- Georginho de Paula with Ulm in 2023

No. 14 – Franca
- Position: Point guard / shooting guard
- League: Novo Basquete Brasil

Personal information
- Born: May 24, 1996 (age 30) Diadema, São Paulo, Brazil
- Listed height: 6 ft 6 in (1.98 m)
- Listed weight: 194 lb (88 kg)

Career information
- NBA draft: 2017: undrafted
- Playing career: 2013–present

Career history
- 2013–2016: Pinheiros
- 2016–2017: Paulistano
- 2017–2018: Rio Grande Valley Vipers
- 2018–2019: Paulistano
- 2019–2021: São Paulo FC
- 2021–2023: Franca
- 2023–2024: Ratiopharm Ulm
- 2024–present: Franca

Career highlights
- FIBA Intercontinental Cup champion (2023); Champions League Americas champion (2023); All-BCL Americas First Team (2023); 2× NBB champion (2022, 2023); NBB Finals MVP (2023); NBB Most Improved Player (2017); 3× All-NBB Team (2020, 2021, 2023)
- Stats at Basketball Reference
Medals
Representing Brazil
Men's basketball
FIBA AmeriCup
Gold medal – first place	2025 Managua
Silver medal – second place	2022 Brazil
FIBA South America U17 Championship
Bronze medal – third place	2013 Salto

George "Georginho" Lucas Alves de Paula (born May 24, 1996), commonly known as Georginho, is a Brazilian professional basketball player formerly for Ratiopharm Ulm. Widely regarded as one of the best Brazilian players of his generation, he has known success in Brazil and internationally, winning the BCL Americas and the FIBA Intercontinental Cup in 2023. Georginho won two NBB championships as well, being named Finals MVP in Franca's 2022 title.

== Professional career ==
=== Pinheiros (2013–2016) ===
De Paula made his professional debut with E.C. Pinheiros in Brazil's top-tier level league, the NBB, during the 2013–14 season. On April 21, 2015, de Paula entered the 2015 NBA draft. He then withdrew from the draft, before the draft removal deadline.

=== Athletico Paulistano (2016–2017) ===
In 2016, he joined the Brazilian League club Club Athletico Paulistano.

=== Rio Grande Valley Vipers (2017–2018) ===
On the April 2017 deadline, de Paula decided to enter his name for the 2017 NBA draft. Two months later, he became one of only 10 international underclassmen to confirm his permanent entry for the NBA Draft that year. Ultimately, he would not be drafted that year, but competed for the Houston Rockets in 2017 NBA Summer League. He would later sign a training camp deal with the Rockets on September 27 that same year. He would later be one of four players released from the team on October 13. Later on that month, de Paula would sign with the Rio Grande Valley Vipers for the rest of the season.

=== Return to Paulistano (2018–2019) ===
On June 11, 2018, de Paula returned to Paulistano.

=== São Paulo FC and Franca (2019–present) ===
He played two seasons with São Paulo FC and was named to the All-NBB Team both seasons.

Georginho won the 2022–23 BCL Americas with Franca, his first continental title, and was named to the Ideal Five (all-league first team) of the season. He also led Franca to their second consecutive NBB title and was named Finals MVP. Georginho was also selected to the All-NBB Team for a third time.

In September 2023, closed off his stint with Franca by playing in the 2023 FIBA Intercontinental Cup in Singapore, where the team represented the Americas. Georginho won the championship title with Franca.

=== Ratiopharm Ulm (2023–2024) ===
In the 2023 offseason, Georginho joined German club ratiopharm Ulm, his first club in Europe.

=== Return to Franca (2024–present) ===
On June 15, 2024, Georginho returned to Franca, signing a contract for the 2024–25 season.

== National team career ==
=== Brazilian junior national team ===
De Paula played with Brazil's under-17 national team at the 2013 FIBA South American Under-17 Championship, where he won a bronze medal. He represented his country's under-18 national team, at the 2014 FIBA Americas Under-18 Championship.

=== Brazilian senior national team ===
De Paula has been a member of the senior Brazilian national basketball team. With Brazil, he played at the 2017 FIBA AmeriCup.
