= Lucas Dias (basketball) =

Brazilian basketball player (born 1995)

No. 9 – Franca
- Position: Power forward
- League: NBB

Personal information
- Born: July 6, 1995 (age 31) Bauru, São Paulo, Brazil
- Listed height: 6 ft 10 in (2.08 m)
- Listed weight: 225 lb (102 kg)

Career information
- Playing career: 2011–present

Career history
- 2011–2016: Pinheiros
- 2016–2018: Paulistano
- 2018–present: Franca

Career highlights
- FIBA Intercontinental Cup champion (2023); Champions League Americas champion (2023); All-BCL Americas First Team (2023); 3× NBB champion (2018, 2022, 2023); NBB Finals MVP (2022); NBB Season MVP (2023); 3× All-NBB Team (2019, 2021, 2023); NBB Revelation Player (2016)
Medals
Men's basketball
Representing Brazil
FIBA AmeriCup
| Gold medal – first place | 2025 Managua |
| Silver medal – second place | 2022 Brazil |
FIBA Americas Under-18 Championship
| Silver medal – second place | 2012 Brazil |

Lucas Dias Silva, commonly known as either Lucas Dias, or simply as Lucas (born July 6, 1995) is a Brazilian professional basketball player for Franca of the Novo Basquete Brasil (NBB).

== Professional career ==
Dias was named Jordan Brand Classic International MVP in 2012. On April 21, 2015, it was announced that he would enter the 2015 NBA draft. However, he withdrew from the draft before the draft withdrawal deadline.

Dias began his pro career with the Brazilian NBB League club Pinheiros. He was named the Brazilian League Revelation Player of the 2015–16 season. In 2016, he moved to the Brazilian club Paulistano. He has been named to the All-NBB Team two times, in 2019 and 2021.

On 15 April 2023, Dias won the 2022–23 BCL Americas with Franca and was named to the league's Best Five. As the champions of the Americas, Franca qualified for the 2023 FIBA Intercontinental Cup in Singapore in September. On September 24, Franca defeated Telekom Baskets Bonn in the final behind Dias' buzzer beater fadeaway from the post which gave them the 70-69 victory.

== National team career ==
=== Brazilian junior national team ===
Dias represented Brazil at the international level, with its junior national teams. With Brazil's junior national teams, he played at the following tournaments: the 2011 FIBA Americas Under-16 Championship, the 2011 FIBA South American Under-17 Championship, the 2012 FIBA Americas Under-18 Championship, where he won a silver medal, and the 2013 FIBA Under-19 World Championship.

=== Brazilian senior national team ===
Dias has been a member of the senior Brazilian national basketball team. With Brazil, he played at the FIBA AmeriCup in 2017 and 2022. Dias and Brazil won the silver medal in the 2022 tournament. Dias also played at the 2023 FIBA Basketball World Cup.

== NBB career statistics ==
| † | Denotes seasons in which Lucas Dias won NBB championship |
| * | Led the league |

=== Regular season ===
| Season | Team | GP | MPG | 2P% | 3P% | FT% | RPG | APG | SPG | BPG | PPG |
|---|---|---|---|---|---|---|---|---|---|---|---|
| 2011–12 | Pinheiros | 4 | 4.1 | .600 | 1.000 | .500 | 1.0 | .0 | .8 | .0 | 3.3 |
| 2012–13 | Pinheiros | 25 | 12.5 | .545 | .352 | .667 | 1.9 | .7 | .3 | .4 | 4.0 |
| 2013–14 | Pinheiros | 27 | 12.9 | .614 | .298 | .686 | 2.1 | .8 | .6 | .2 | 4.4 |
| 2014–15 | Pinheiros | 21 | 12.7 | .538 | .271 | 1.000 | 2.7 | .5 | .4 | .2 | 4.5 |
| 2015–16 | Pinheiros | 27 | 30.8 | .505 | .431 | .816 | 5.3 | 2.8 | 1.3 | .4 | 15.5 |
| 2016–17 | Paulistano | 24 | 25.1 | .481 | .387 | .732 | 3.8 | 1.3 | 1.0 | .8 | 12.2 |
| 2017–18† | Paulistano | 26 | 22.1 | .570 | .267 | .704 | 4.7 | 1.7 | 1.2 | .7 | 10.2 |
| 2018–19 | Franca | 25 | 30.5 | .642 | .357 | .820 | 4.5 | 1.6 | 1.0 | 1.0 | 15.6 |
| Career | | 179 | 20.8 | .554 | .353 | .759 | 3.6 | 1.2 | .8 | .5 | 9.5 |

=== Playoffs ===
| Season | Team | GP | MPG | 2P% | 3P% | FT% | RPG | APG | SPG | BPG | PPG |
|---|---|---|---|---|---|---|---|---|---|---|---|
| 2014 | Pinheiros | 7 | 9.1 | .667 | .444 | .500 | 1.4 | .4 | .1 | .3 | 4.7 |
| 2014 | Pinheiros | 4 | 25.4 | .583 | .444 | .667 | 4.5 | 1.5 | .8 | .5 | 10.0 |
| 2015 | Pinheiros | 2 | 1.5 | .000 | .000 | .000 | 0.0 | .0 | .0 | .0 | .0 |
| 2016 | Pinheiros | 9 | 34.3 | .446 | .426 | .810 | 5.8 | 1.9 | .6 | .3 | 17.0 |
| 2017 | Paulistano | 18 | 30.9 | .419 | .347 | .810 | 5.3 | .8 | .4 | .8 | 13.4 |
| 2018† | Paulistano | 13 | 26.9 | .551 | .367 | .771 | 4.9 | 1.5 | .9 | 1.1 | 12.1 |
| 2019 | Franca | 11 | 31.6 | .549 | .393 | .765 | 6.5 | 1.5 | .9 | .5 | 17.6 |
| Career | | 64 | 27.0 | .500 | .385 | .788 | 4.7 | 1.2 | .6 | .6 | 12.8 |

== Personal ==
Lucas Dias grew up with Lucas Mariano, who has also played in the NBB.
