= Minas Tênis Clube (basketball) =

Minas
- Leagues: NBB; BCL Americas
- Founded: 1937; 89 years ago (as basketball team)
- Arena: Arena MTC
- Capacity: 4,000
- Location: Belo Horizonte, Brazil
- Team colors: White and Blue
- Head coach: Espiga
- Championships: 1 South American Club Championship
- Website: minastenisclube.com.br/esportes/basquete
Home	Away

Minas Tênis Clube, commonly known simply as Minas or the Minas Storm, is a Brazilian basketball club based in Belo Horizonte. It is part of the Minas Tênis Clube multi-sports club. The team plays in the Novo Basquete Brasil (NBB) under the sponsorship name Decisão Engenharia/Minas. It also plays in the BCL Americas as of the 2021–22 season.

The team has won one continental title, winning the South American Champions Cup in 2007.

== History ==
Minas was one of the top teams in the first years of Novo Basquete Brasil, reaching the semifinal series two straight years. In both semifinals, the team, led by the center Murilo Becker and the point guard Facundo Sucatzky, was defeated by Brasília. In the 2009–10 NBB season, Minas showed off point guard Raul Togni Neto, better known as Raulzinho. Neto was chosen as the NBB Revelation Player and then moved to the Spanish team Lagun Aro. In the 2011–12 NBB season, Minas had a very bad campaign, finishing in thirteenth place and getting out of the playoffs. For the following season the managers made a great renovation of the cast, hiring young players.

== Titles and honors ==
- Copa Super 8 (1): 2021–22
- Campeonato Sudamericano de Clubes (1): 2007
- Amsterdam International Tournament (1): 2007
- Campeonato Metropolitano (5): 1985, 1986, 1988, 1991, 1994
- Campeonato Interestadual (1): 1986
- Torneio Internacional Mercosul (1): 1993
- Torneio José Bento (1): 1993

== Players ==
=== Current roster ===
Note: Flags indicate national team eligibility at FIBA-sanctioned events. Players may hold other non-FIBA nationalities not displayed.

Minas Tênis Clube roster
Players
Coaches

Pos.	No.	Nat.	Name	Ht.	Wt.	Age
G/F		(Brazil)	Garcia, Alex	1.93 m (6 ft 4 in)	102 kg (225 lb)	46 – 4 March 1980
PG		(Brazil)	Rossetto, Davi	1.85 m (6 ft 1 in)	83 kg (183 lb)	33 – 27 July 1992
G/F		(Brazil)	Deodato, Gui	1.92 m (6 ft 4 in)	92 kg (203 lb)	35 – 2 June 1991
F/C	0	(United States)	Daniel, Sam	2.02 m (6 ft 8 in)	105 kg (231 lb)	30 – 1 January 1996
PG	4	(Brazil)	de Lima, Lucas	1.85 m (6 ft 1 in)	76 kg (168 lb)	30 – 21 June 1995
PG	5	(Brazil)	Leão, Augusto	1.84 m (6 ft 0 in)	82 kg (181 lb)	27 – 21 November 1998
PF	6	(Brazil)	dos Santos, Shilton	1.96 m (6 ft 5 in)	100 kg (220 lb)	43 – 3 February 1983
G/F	7	(Brazil)	Campos, Jefferson	1.86 m (6 ft 1 in)	84 kg (185 lb)	35 – 9 February 1991
SF	10	(United States)	Bob, Che	1.98 m (6 ft 6 in)	90 kg (198 lb)	29 – 1 January 1997
SF	12	(Brazil)	Ribeiro, Samuel	2.03 m (6 ft 8 in)	76 kg (168 lb)	24 – 24 January 2002
PF	13	(Brazil)	Dias, Tiago	2.01 m (6 ft 7 in)	93 kg (205 lb)	25 – 4 January 2001
PG	19	(Brazil)	Chaia, Gegê	1.88 m (6 ft 2 in)	86 kg (190 lb)	35 – 3 February 1991
C	21	(Brazil)	Waszkiewicz, Leonardo	2.11 m (6 ft 11 in)	109 kg (240 lb)	37 – 23 May 1989
PF	35	(Brazil)	Silva, Marcos	2.03 m (6 ft 8 in)	88 kg (194 lb)	26 – 4 August 1999

Head coach

(Brazil) Flávio Soares "Espiga"

Assistant coach(es)

- (Brazil) Luiz Fernando Nery Leão
- (Brazil) Bruno Porto Prado e Silva

Legend

- (C) Team captain
- Injured

- Roster
Updated: 9 July 2019

=== Notable players ===
- (Brazil) Leandrinho Barbosa
- (Brazil) Murilo Becker
- (Brazil) Bruno Carneiro
- (Brazil) Raulzinho Neto
- (Brazil) Milton Setrini
- (Brazil) Gui Santos
- (Argentina) Facundo Sucatzky
- (United States) Jermaine Beal

=== Players at the NBA draft ===
*	Denotes player who has been selected for at least one All-Star Game and All-NBA Team
^{#}	Denotes player who has never appeared in an NBA regular-season or playoff game
^{~}	Denotes player who has been selected as Rookie of the Year

Position	Player	Year	Round	Pick	Drafted by
SF	(Brazil) Gui Santos	2022	2nd round	55th	Golden State Warriors

== Head coaches ==
- (Argentina) Che García
