= Bauru Basket =

- Leagues: NBB
- Founded: 1994; 32 years ago
- History: List: Luso Tilibra Bauru 1994; 1996 Luso Tilibra Unimed Bauru 1995 Tilibra Copimax Bauru 1997–2002 Bauru Basquete 2002–2003 Sukest Bauru 2004 Plasútil Sukest Bauru 2005–2006 GRSA Bauru 2008 GRSA Itabom Bauru 2009–2010 Itabom Bauru 2010–2012 Paschoalotto Bauru 2012–2016 Gocil Bauru 2016–2017 Sendi Bauru 2017–2020 Zopone Gocil Bauru 2020–present
- Arena: Ginásio Panela de Pressão
- Capacity: 2,000
- Location: Bauru, São Paulo, Brazil
- Team colors: Green, White, Black
- President: Plínio Cabrini Júnior
- Head coach: Paulo Jáu
- Championships: 1 FIBA Americas League; 2 South American League; 2 Brazilian Championship; 3 Paulista State Championships
- Website: baurubasket.com.br
Home	Away

The Associação Bauru Basketball Team, commonly known as Bauru Basquete (Bauru Basket), is a Brazilian professional basketball team that is based in Bauru, São Paulo, Brazil. The club plays Brazil's top-tier level league, the Novo Basquete Brasil (NBB).

Founded in 1994, Bauru has won two NBB championships, in 2002 and 2016. They also won the continental championship once when they won the FIBA Americas League in 2015. Bauru was the runner-up in the 2015 FIBA Intercontinental Cup.

The team plays its home games in the Ginásio Panela de Pressão, which has capacity for 2,000 people. Bauru is known for being the second club of Leandrinho Barbosa.

== Crests and colors ==
The club's official logo –2016.

The club's official logo 2016–present.

== History ==
Bauru was the second team of the Brazilian shooting guard Leandrinho Barbosa. Barbosa was an important player during the previous top-tier level Nacional Championship, in 2002. In that year, Bauru won the championship title, after winning a series against Araraquara. Barbosa and his teammates Marquinhos Vieira, Murilo Becker, Vanderlei, and others, won the series by a 3–0 score.

In the new Brazilian top-tier league, the NBB's first season (2008–09), Bauru signed the American Brazilian point guard Larry Taylor. In the NBB's fourth season (2011–12), Taylor, helped by the young player Gui Deodato, the experienced Fernando Fischer, and another American, Jeff Agba, led the team to a sixth place finish in the league.

Bauru won its first FIBA Americas League championship, as they won the 2015 FIBA Americas League. The club was thus crowned the Latin American champions for the first time. Because of the Americas League victory, the team would then play in the 2015 FIBA Intercontinental Cup, against the EuroLeague's 2014–15 season champions, Real Madrid.

Bauru Basket has also won three São Paulo State Championships. Bauru reached even bigger heights, when it was announced that the team would be a part of the 2015–16 NBA preseason's international versus NBA games. Bauru played against the NBA clubs, the New York Knicks and the Washington Wizards in the United States, becoming the third Brazilian team to play against NBA teams, after C.R. Vasco da Gama and C.R. Flamengo.

In the 2016–17 NBB season, after two consecutive losses in the NBB's finals, Bauru finally became the Brazilian League champions once again, by winning the title for the first time in 15 years. They won the title, after coming back from a 2-0 series deficit, to beat C.A. Paulistano, in a 5 games series. Bauru's Alex Garcia, was named the NBB Finals MVP.

== Honors and titles ==
=== Worldwide ===
- FIBA Intercontinental Cup

Runners-up (1): 2015

=== Latin America ===
- FIBA Americas League

Champions (1): 2015
Runners-up (1): 2016

=== Continental ===
- South American League

Champions (2): 2014, 2022

- South American Club Championship

Runners-up (1): 1999

=== National ===
- Brazilian Championship

Champions (2): 2002, 2016–17
Runners-up (2): 2014–15, 2015–16

=== Regional ===
- São Paulo State Championship

Champions (3): 1999, 2013, 2014
Runners-up (2): 2000, 2016

=== Other tournaments ===
- Troféu Cláudio Mortari

Winners (2): 2015, 2016

- Torneio Interligas: 2019
- Copa TV TEM: 2008
- Copa EPTV: 2010

== Matches against NBA teams ==
7 October 2015

Box Score

Bauru (Brazil)	81–100	(United States) New York Knicks

(United States) Madison Square Garden, New York City

11 October 2015

Box Score

Bauru (Brazil)	100–134	(United States) Washington Wizards

(United States) Verizon Center, Washington, D.C.

== Players ==
=== Current roster (season 2022-23) ===
Note: Flags indicate national team eligibility at FIBA-sanctioned events. Players may hold other non-FIBA nationalities not displayed.

Bauru Basket roster
Players
Coaches

Pos.	No.	Nat.	Name	Ht.	Age
PG	3	(United States)	Brite, Dontrell	1.75 m (5 ft 9 in)	32 – 31 March 1994
G	4	(United States) (Brazil)	Taylor, Larry	1.85 m (6 ft 1 in)	46 – 3 October 1980
G/F	10	(Brazil)	Garcia, Alex	1.88 m (6 ft 2 in)	46 – 4 March 1980
C	12	(Brazil)	Carvalho, Vitor	2.03 m (6 ft 8 in)	22 – 30 August 2004
F	15	(United States)	Holt, Emmitt	2.00 m (6 ft 7 in)	30 – 23 April 1996
C	16	(Brazil)	Rodrigues, Anderson	2.08 m (6 ft 10 in)	29 – 6 August 1997
F	17	(Brazil)	Ramos, Joao	2.00 m (6 ft 7 in)	27 – 15 January 1999
C	22	(Brazil)	Da Cruz, Felipe	2.11 m (6 ft 11 in)	26 – 18 April 2000

Head coach

- (Brazil) Paulo Jáu

Assistant coach(es)

- (Brazil) Hudson Previdelo

Legend

- (C) Team captain
- Injured

- Roster
Updated: 29 January 2020

== Notable players ==
Note: Flags indicate national team eligibility at FIBA-sanctioned events. Players may hold other non-FIBA nationalities not displayed.

Criteria

To appear in this section a player must have either:

- Set a club record or won an individual award while at the club
- Played at least one official international match for their national team at any time
- Played at least one official NBA match at any time.

- (Brazil) Leandrinho Barbosa
- (Brazil) Murilo Becker
- (Brazil) Valtinho da Silva
- (Brazil) Maury de Souza
- (Brazil) Josuel dos Santos
- (Brazil) Alex Garcia
- (Brazil) Rafael Hettsheimeir
- (Brazil) Larry Taylor
- (Brazil) Marquinhos Vieira

== Head coaches ==
- (Brazil) Jorge "Guerrinha" Guerra
- (Brazil) Demétrius Conrado Ferraciú
- (Brazil) Paulo Jáu
