= 2018–19 Flamengo Basketball season =

Flamengo
2018–19 season
- Chairman: Eduardo Bandeira de Mello
- Head coach: Gustavo de Conti
- Eduardo Bandeira de Mello: Eduardo Bandeira de Mello
- Arena: Ginásio Hélio Maurício (capacity: 1,000); Tijuca Tênis Clube (capacity: 4,500); Arena Carioca 1 (capacity: 5,000); Jeunesse Arena (capacity: 15,000)
- Campeonato Carioca: Winners (win Botafogo)
- NBB: Winners
- FIBA Liga Sudamericana: Semifinals
- Highest home attendance: 1,545 (vs Corinthians 3 November 2018)
- Lowest home attendance: 593 (vs Mogi das Cruzes/Helbor 30 October 2018)
- Average home attendance: 931
Home	Away

The 2018–19 season of Flamengo Basketball is the 99th season of the club, and the club's 11th in the Novo Basquete Brasil (NBB). This is the first season after the club captain Marcelinho Machado retired.

== Offseason ==
On May 15, 2018, Flamengo announced they would not renew with head coach José Neto after the team failed to win a title or obtain FIBA Americas League qualification for the second season in a row. On June 4, Gustavo de Conti was named as Neto's replacement.

On July 2, 2018, the club announced the creation of the General Manager position, with Diego Jeleilate arriving from Corpore/Paulistano for the job.

== Pre-season ==
On May 21, 2018, it was announced that the club would play against the Orlando Magic in Florida during the 2018 NBA preseason, in October 5. This will mark the 5th time the club will play against NBA opposition (a record between South American clubs), the 4th time in American soil, and the 3rd against the Magic.

The State League was played as the main preparation for the upcoming season, despite being an official competition. Flamengo won all 6 league round games, despite new signing Kevin Crescenzi missing all games due to ankle injury. He played his first couple for the club on the semifinals against semi-amateur side ABIG/Niterói, winning both games (97-38 and 113-55). Flamengo played local rival's Botafogo in the finals, winning the series 2–0. It was the 13th straight State League title for the club, and 45th overall.

On September 28, 2018, Flamengo announced that Leandro Barbosa signed to play for the team in their NBA preseason game against the Magic.

== Roster ==
Note: Flags indicate national team eligibility at FIBA-sanctioned events. Players may hold other non-FIBA nationalities not displayed.

Flamengo Basketball roster
Players
Coaches

Pos.	No.	Nat.	Name	Ht.	Wt.	Age
PG	5	(Brazil)	Rossetto, Davi	1.85 m (6 ft 1 in)	84 kg (185 lb)	33 – 27 July 1992
PG	6	(Argentina)	Balbi, Franco	1.85 m (6 ft 1 in)		36 – 21 August 1989
F	7	(Brazil)	Luz, Jhonatan	1.97 m (6 ft 6 in)	96 kg (212 lb)	38 – 2 October 1987
SG	8	(United States)	Crescenzi, Kevin	1.93 m (6 ft 4 in)	90 kg (198 lb)	33 – 2 January 1993
CG	9	(Brazil)	Ramos, Deryk	1.88 m (6 ft 2 in)	88 kg (194 lb)	31 – 14 June 1994
PG	10	(Brazil)	Matheusinho
G/F	11	(Brazil)	Marquinhos (C)	2.07 m (6 ft 9 in)	102 kg (225 lb)	41 – 31 May 1984
F/C	12	(Brazil)	Mineiro, Rafael	2.09 m (6 ft 10 in)	106 kg (234 lb)	37 – 3 June 1988
PF	15	(Brazil)	Aprigio, Lucas
PF	16	(Brazil)	Olivinha (C)	2.03 m (6 ft 8 in)	118 kg (260 lb)	42 – 18 April 1983
F/C	17	(Brazil)	Varejão, Anderson	2.11 m (6 ft 11 in)	124 kg (273 lb)	43 – 28 September 1982
PG	21	(Brazil)	Camargo, João Matheus
F	25	(The Bahamas)	Nesbitt, David	2.00 m (6 ft 7 in)	110 kg (243 lb)	34 – 10 February 1991
PF	30	(Brazil)	Miranda, Ruan
SF	32	(Brazil)	Batista, Aieser
C	34	(Brazil)	França, João Vitor	2.13 m (7 ft 0 in)	120 kg (265 lb)	27 – 15 December 1998

Head coach

- (Brazil) Gustavo de Conti

Assistant coach(es)

Team manager

- (Brazil) Marcelo Vido
- (Brazil) Diego Jeleilate

Legend

- (C) Team captain
- Injured

=== Depth chart ===
Pos.	Starting 5	Bench 1	Bench/LDB Team	LDB Team	LDB Team/U-19's
C	Anderson Varejão	Rafael Mineiro	João Vitor	Sorriso
PF	David Nesbitt	Olivinha	Ruan Miranda	Aprígio	André Miguel
SF	Marquinhos	Jhonatan Luz	Aieser Batista	Felipin	Matheus Assis
SG	Deryk Ramos	Kevin Crescenzi	Camargo	Varela
PG	Franco Balbi	Davi Rossetto	Matheusinho	Joãozinho

=== Technical staff ===
Position	Staff
General manager	Diego Jeleilate
Supervisor	André Guimarães
Head coach	Gustavo de Conti
Assistant coach	Fernando Pereira
Fitness trainer	Bruno Nicolaci; Rafael Bernardelli
Physioterapist	Ricardo Machado

== Transactions ==
=== In ===
No.	Pos.	Nat.	Name	Age	Moving from		Type	Ends	Transfer fee	Date	Source
	HC	(Brazil)	Gustavo de Conti	38	Corpore/Paulistano	(Brazil)	Free agency	2020	–	4 June 2018	
9	SG	(Brazil)	Deryk Ramos	23	Corpore/Paulistano	(Brazil)	Free agency	2019	–	11 June 2018	
7	SF	(Brazil)	Jhonatan Luz	31	Corpore/Paulistano	(Brazil)	Free agency	2019	–	13 June 2018	
25	PF	(The Bahamas)	David Nesbitt	26	Corpore/Paulistano	(Brazil)	Free agency	2019	–	15 June 2018	
8	SG	(United States)	Kevin Crescenzi	25	LSB Uniso	(Brazil)	Free agency	2019	–	18 June 2018	
12	C	(Brazil)	Rafael Mineiro	30	SESI/Franca Basquete	(Brazil)	Free agency	2019	–	20 June 2018	
6	PG	(Argentina)	Franco Balbi	28	Ferro Carril	(Argentina)	Free agency	2019	–	21 June 2018	
5	PG	(Brazil)	Davi Rossetto	25	Solar Cearense	(Brazil)	Free agency	2019	–	10 July 2018	
19	SG	(Brazil)	Leandro Barbosa	35	SESI/Franca Basquete	(Brazil)	Free agency	2018	–	28 September 2018	

=== Out ===
No.	Pos.	Nat.	Name	Age	Moving to		Type	Transfer fee	Date	Source
4	SF	(Brazil)	Marcelinho	43			Retired		3 May 2018	
	HC	(Brazil)	José Neto	47	Levanga Hokkaido	(Japan)	End of contract		15 May 2018	
0	PF	(Dominican Republic)	M. J. Rhett	25	Leones de Santo Domingo	(Dominican Republic)	End of contract		19 June 2018	
3	SG	(Brazil)	Mogi	21	Botafogo	(Brazil)	End of contract		20 June 2018	
8	PG	(Venezuela)	David Cubillán	30	Trotamundos	(Venezuela)	End of contract		22 June 2018	
13	C	(Brazil)	J.P. Batista	36	Mogi das Cruzes/Helbor	(Brazil)	End of contract		1 July 2018	
5	PF	(Brazil)	Pilar	34	Vasco da Gama	(Brazil)	End of contract		1 July 2018	
23	PG	(Brazil)	Arthur Pecos	23	Mogi das Cruzes/Helbor	(Brazil)	End of contract		2 July 2018	
19	SG	(Brazil)	Leandro Barbosa	35			End of contract	–	5 October 2018	

== Player statistics ==
Legend
GP	Games played	GS	Games started	MPG	Minutes per game
FG%	Field-goal percentage	3FG%	3-point field-goal percentage	FT%	Free-throw percentage
RPG	Rebounds per game	APG	Assists per game	SPG	Steals per game
BPG	Blocks per game	PPG	Points per game	EFF	Efficiency per game

=== Campeonato Carioca ===
Player	GP	GS	MPG	PPG	FG%	3FG%	FT%	RPG	APG	SPG	BPG	EFF
Franco Balbi	2	1	24:11	5	49.5%	0%	100%	4.5	4.5	1.5	0	8
Aieser Batista	1	0	4:39	0	0%	0%	-	0	0	0	0	-1
Kevin Crescenzi	-	-	-	-	-	-	-	-	-	-	-	-
João Vitor França	1	0	14:39	15	80%	-	87%	6	0	0	2	20
Jhonatan Luz	2	0	20:19	5.5	49.5%	20%	50%	6	0	0	0	6
João Matheus	-	-	-	-	-	-	-	-	-	-	-	-
Marquinhos Vieira	1	1	28:46	17	46%	50%	-	7	2.5	0.5	0	15
Matheusinho	1	-	0:58	-	-	-	-	-	-	-	-	-
Rafael Mineiro	1	1	25:29	11	80%	0%	100%	1	3	0	0	11
Ruan Miranda	-	-	-	-	-	-	-	-	-	-	-	-
David Nesbitt	-	-	-	-	-	-	-	-	-	-	-	-
Carlos Olivinha	1	0	14:18	4	40%	0%	0%	4	0	0	0	2
Deryk Ramos	1	1	31:14	10	25%	22%	100%	3	4	2	0	8
Davi Rossetto	1	1	24:21	0	-	-	-	2	1	2	0	2
Anderson Varejão	1	1	28:23	15	41%	0%	62%	13	5	0	0	21
TOTAL				67	40%	23%	64%	45	16	6	0	76

Last updated: August 22, 2018.

=== NBB ===
Player	GP	GS	MPG	PPG	FG%	3FG%	FT%	RPG	APG	SPG	BPG	EFF
Franco Balbi	-	-	-	-	-	-	-	-	-	-	-	-
Aieser Batista	-	-	-	-	-	-	-	-	-	-	-	-
Kevin Crescenzi	-	-	-	-	-	-	-	-	-	-	-	-
João Vitor França	-	-	-	-	-	-	-	-	-	-	-	-
Jhonatan Luz	-	-	-	-	-	-	-	-	-	-	-	-
João Matheus	-	-	-	-	-	-	-	-	-	-	-	-
Marquinhos Vieira	-	-	-	-	-	-	-	-	-	-	-	-
Matheusinho	-	-	-	-	-	-	-	-	-	-	-	-
Rafael Mineiro	-	-	-	-	-	-	-	-	-	-	-	-
Ruan Miranda	-	-	-	-	-	-	-	-	-	-	-	-
David Nesbitt	-	-	-	-	-	-	-	-	-	-	-	-
Carlos Olivinha	-	-	-	-	-	-	-	-	-	-	-	-
Deryk Ramos	-	-	-	-	-	-	-	-	-	-	-	-
Davi Rossetto	-	-	-	-	-	-	-	-	-	-	-	-
Anderson Varejão	-	-	-	-	-	-	-	-	-	-	-	-
TOTAL				-	-	-	-	-	-	-	-	-

== Competitions ==
=== Pre-season and friendlies ===
Win Loss

5 October 2018	Orlando Magic (United States)	119–82	(Brazil) Flamengo	Orlando, United States
19:00 EST	Scoring by quarter: 31-16, 36-27, 26-20, 26-19
	Pts: Gordon 29; Rebs: Bamba 9 Asts: Grant 7	Boxscore	Pts: Marquinhos 19; Rebs: Varejão 12; Asts: Balbi 8	Arena: Amway Center; Attendance: 14.667; Referees: Eric Lewis, Marat Kogut, Brandon Adair

=== Overview ===
Competition	First match	Last match	Starting round	Final position	Record							
Competition	First match	Last match	Starting round	Final position	Pld	W	D	L	PF	PA	PD	Win %
NBB	13 October 2018		Matchday 1		11	8	0	3	861	764	+97	72.73
Liga Sudamericana	22 October 2018		Group Stage		3	3	0	0	277	239	+38	100.00
Campeonato Carioca	18 August 2018	27 September 2018	Matchday 1	Winners	10	10	0	0	890	579	+311	100.00
Total					24	21	0	3	2,028	1,582	+446	87.50

Source: Competitions

=== 2018 Campeonato Carioca ===
==== League table ====
Pos	Team	Pld	W	L	PF	PA	PD	Qualification or relegation
1	Flamengo	6	6	0	509	351	+158	Qualification to playoffs
2	Botafogo	6	4	2	426	379	+47	Qualification to playoffs
3	Vasco	6	2	4	416	447	−31	Qualification to playoffs
4	ABIG/Niterói Caciques	6	0	6	303	477	−174	Qualification to playoffs

Source: FBERJ

==== Results summary ====
Round	1	2	3	4	5	6
Ground	A	H	H	H	A	A
Result	W	W	W	W	W	W
Position	1	1	1	1	1	1

Last updated: September 8, 2018.
Source: Competitive matches
Ground: A = Away; H = Home; R = Rest. Result: L = Loss; W = Win; R = Rest; P = Postponed.

==== Results by round ====
Overall						Home					Away				
Pld	W	L	PF	PA	PD	W	L	PF	PA	PD	W	L	PF	PA	PD
6	6	0	509	344	+165	3	0	266	174	+92	3	0	243	170	+73

Last updated: September 8, 2018.
Source: Competitive matches

==== Matches ====
Win Loss

18 August 2018 1	Botafogo	57–67	Flamengo	Rio de Janeiro, Brazil
11:00 UTC−03:00	Scoring by quarter: 15-12, 11-16, 17-21, 14-18
Botafogo TV	Pts: Ansaloni 18; Rebs: Coelho 6 Asts: Cauê Borges 5 Eff: Ansaloni 18	Boxscore	Pts: Marquinhos 17; Rebs: Varejão 13; Asts: Varejão 5 Eff: Varejão 21	Arena: Ginásio Oscar Zelaya

21 August 2018 2	Flamengo	100–36	ABIG/Niterói Caciques	Rio de Janeiro, Brazil
20:00 UTC−03:00	Scoring by quarter: 31-3, 27-11, 26-9, 16-13
FlaTV	Pts: Varejão 20; Rebs: Jhonatan 8 Asts: Balbi 6 Eff: Varejão 24	Boxscore	Pts: Gabriel Andrade 7 Rebs: Gabriel Andrade 3 Asts: Bernardo Gomes, Gabriel Andrade, Higor Lima 1 Eff: Herbert Ramos 4	Arena: Ginásio Hélio Maurício; Attendance: 500

25 August 2018 3	Flamengo	93–69	Vasco	Rio de Janeiro, Brazil
14:00 UTC−03:00	Scoring by quarter: 20-17, 28-16, 26-20, 19-16
FlaTV	Pts: Varejão 17; Rebs: Mineiro 6 Asts: Balbi 10; Eff: Balbi 28	Boxscore	Pts: Lucão; Rebs: Holloway, Pilar 6 Asts: Vithinho 8 Eff: Lucão 16	Arena: Tijuca Tênis Clube; Attendance: 500

28 August 2018 4	Flamengo	73–69	Botafogo	Rio de Janeiro, Brazil
20:00 UTC−03:00	Scoring by quarter: 23-16, 19-16, 14-14, 17-23
FlaTV	Pts: Deryk 14; Rebs: Olivinha 7 Asts: Marquinhos, Olivinha 4 Eff: Olivinha 22	Boxscore	Pts: Wesley 15; Rebs: Ansaloni, Arthur Henrique 6 Asts: Coelho, Arthur Henrique 4 Eff: Arthur Henrique 15	Arena: Tijuca Tênis Clube; Attendance: 300

1 September 2018 5	Vasco	64–87	Flamengo	Rio de Janeiro, Brazil
14:00 UTC−03:00	Scoring by quarter: 23-15, 10-24, 12-30, 19-18
Vasco App	Pts: Holloway 15; Rebs: Lucão, Holloway, Lupa 5 Asts: Pilar 4 Eff: Lucão 13	Boxscore	Pts: Mineiro 18; Rebs: Marquinhos 8 Asts: Deryk, Davi Rossetto 5 Eff: Mineiro 20	Arena: Arena da Juventude; Attendance: 400

8 September 2018 6	ABIG/Niterói Caciques	56–89	Flamengo	Niterói, Brazil
20:00 UTC−03:00	Scoring by quarter: 21-21, 12-32, 16-17, 7-19
	Pts: Marcio Mattos 17; Rebs: Gabriel Andrade 7 Asts: Gabriel Andrade, Bernardo Gomes, Marcio Mattos 2 Eff: Marcio Mattos 16	Boxscore	Pts: Balbi 19; Rebs: João Vitor 16; Asts: Davi Rossetto 6 Eff: João Vitor 24	Arena: Ginásio La Salle; Attendance: 400

==== Results overview ====
Win Loss

Opposition	Home score	Away score	Double
ABIG/Niterói Caciques	100-36	89-56	189-92
Botafogo	73-69	67-57	140-126
Vasco	93-69	87-64	180-133

=== Campeonato Carioca Playoffs ===
Win Loss

==== Semi finals ====
19 September 2018 1	Flamengo	97–38	ABIG/Niterói Caciques	Rio de Janeiro, Brazil
20:00 UTC−03:00	Scoring by quarter: 17-7, 29-10, 25-13, 26-8
FlaTV	Pts: Marquinhos 21; Rebs: Varejão 17; Asts: Balbi 6 Eff: Varejão 25	Boxscore	Pts: Victor Leal 10; Rebs: Douglas de Souza 8 Asts: Gabriel Andrade 3 Eff: Douglas de Souza 10	Arena: Ginásio Hélio Maurício; Attendance: 350

20 September 2018 2	ABIG/Niterói Caciques	55–113	Flamengo	Rio de Janeiro, Brazil *
20:00 UTC−03:00	Scoring by quarter: 19-21, 7-29, 20-36, 9-27
FlaTV	Pts: Victor Leal 13; Rebs: Israel Pinto, Marcio Mattos 3 Asts: Victor Leal 4 Eff: Gabriel Andrade 10	Boxscore	Pts: Marquinhos 19; Rebs: Olivinha 16; Asts: Crescenzi 7 Eff: Olivinha 25	Arena: Ginásio Hélio Maurício; Attendance: 350

*Due to scheduling conflicts, Niterói's home game was played at Flamengo's arena

==== Final ====
25 September 2018 1	Flamengo	88–69	Botafogo	Rio de Janeiro, Brazil
20:00 UTC−03:00	Scoring by quarter: 24-13, 18-8, 17-27, 29-21
FlaTV	Pts: Marquinhos 16; Rebs: Nesbitt 8 Asts: Davi Rossetto 7 Eff: Davi Rossetto 18	Boxscore	Pts: Jamaal, Arthur Henrique 16; Rebs: Ansaloni 10; Asts: Cauê Borges 5 Eff: Jamaal 13	Arena: Tijuca Tênis Clube; Attendance: 450

27 September 2018 2	Botafogo	73–83	Flamengo	Rio de Janeiro, Brazil
20:00 UTC−03:00	Scoring by quarter: 12-19, 20-19, 22-16, 19-29
Botafogo TV	Pts: Jamaal 20; Rebs: Ansaloni 7 Asts: Cauê Borges 4 Eff: Jamaal 19	Boxscore	Pts: Deryk, Marquinhos 14; Rebs: Deryk, Varejão, Jhonatan 5 Asts: Balbi 6 Eff: Balbi 17	Arena: Ginásio Oscar Zelaya; Attendance: 400

=== 2018 Liga Sudamericana ===
==== First Stage (Group D) ====
===== League table =====
Pos	Team	Pld	W	L	PF	PA	PD	Pts	Qualification
1	(Brazil) Flamengo	3	3	0	277	239	+38	6	Advance to Semifinal Phase
2	(Argentina) Libertad	3	2	1	252	235	+17	5	Advance to Semifinal Phase
3	(Uruguay) Welcome	3	1	2	226	240	−14	4	
4	(Uruguay) Goes (H)	3	0	3	214	255	−41	3	

Source: FIBA
(H) Hosts

===== Results summary =====
Round	1	2	3
Ground	N	N	N
Result	W	W	W
Position	1	1	1

Last updated: October 25, 2018.
Source: Competitive matches
Ground: A = Away; H = Home; R = Rest. Result: L = Loss; W = Win; R = Rest; P = Postponed.

===== Matches =====
22 October 2018 1	Libertad (Argentina)	86–98	(Brazil) Flamengo	Montevideo, Uruguay
19:45 UYT	Scoring by quarter: 29-19, 18-20, 21-30, 18-29
SporTV	Pts: Saglietti 18; Rebs: Kelley 8 Asts: Copello 7 Eff: Cuello 19	Boxscore	Pts: Deryk 24; Rebs: Nesbitt 6 Asts: Deryk 6 Eff: Deryk 23	Arena: Palacio Peñarol

23 October 2018 2	Goes (Uruguay)	81–93	(Brazil) Flamengo	Montevideo, Uruguay
22:00 UYT	Scoring by quarter: 18-23, 17-22, 26-23, 20-25
SporTV	Pts: Shaw 24; Rebs: Shaw 8 Asts: Martínez 11; Eff: Shaw 21	Boxscore	Pts: Marquinhos 26; Rebs: Nesbitt 10; Asts: Deryk 7 Eff: Marquinhos 29	Arena: Palacio Peñarol

24 October 2018 3	Flamengo (Brazil)	86–72	(Uruguay) Welcome	Montevideo, Uruguay
19:45 UYT	Scoring by quarter: 25-11, 18-19, 17-20, 26-22
SporTV	Pts: Marquinhos 17; Rebs: Varejão 10; Asts: Deryk 5 Eff: Marquinhos 24	Boxscore	Pts: Varela 20; Rebs: Charquero 7 Asts: De Gouveia 6 Eff: Varela 20	Arena: Palacio Peñarol

==== Semifinals (Group F) ====
===== League table =====
Pos	Team	Pld	W	L	PF	PA	PD	Pts	Qualification
1	(Argentina) Instituto	3	3	0	257	207	+50	6	Advance to Finals
2	(Brazil) Flamengo (H)	3	2	1	277	242	+35	5	
3	(Brazil) Minas Tênis Clube	3	1	2	207	240	−33	4	
4	(Brazil) Bauru	3	0	3	200	252	−52	3	

Source: FIBA
(H) Hosts

===== Results summary =====
Round	1	2	3
Ground	H	H	H
Result			
Position			

Last updated: November 7, 2018.
Source: Competitive matches
Ground: A = Away; H = Home; R = Rest. Result: L = Loss; W = Win; R = Rest; P = Postponed.

===== Matches =====
20 November 2018 4	Flamengo (Brazil)	84–91	(Argentina) Instituto	Rio de Janeiro, Brazil
17:15 UTC−03:00	Scoring by quarter: 19-22, 21-19, 20-28, 24-24
SporTV	Pts: Marquinhos 23; Rebs: Marquinhos, Olivinha 10; Asts: Marquinhos, Deryk 4 Eff: Marquinhos 28		Pts: Piñero 21; Rebs: Espinoza 6 Asts: Whelan 7 Eff: Scala 23	Arena: Jeunesse Arena

21 November 2018 5	Flamengo (Brazil)	vs.	(Brazil) Minas	Rio de Janeiro, Brazil
19:15 UTC−03:00
SporTV				Arena: Jeunesse Arena

22 November 2018 6	Flamengo (Brazil)	vs.	(Brazil) Sendi/Bauru Basket	Rio de Janeiro, Brazil
20:30 UTC−03:00
SporTV				Arena: Jeunesse Arena

=== 2018-19 NBB ===
==== League table ====
Pos	Team	Pld	W	L	PF	PA	PD	Qualification or relegation
1	SESI Franca	26	23	3	2258	1992	+266	Qualification to playoffs quarterfinals
2	Flamengo	26	22	4	2197	1836	+361	Qualification to playoffs quarterfinals
3	Pinheiros	26	21	5	2154	1976	+178	Qualification to playoffs quarterfinals
4	Mogi das Cruzes/Helbor	26	17	9	2195	2095	+100	Qualification to playoffs quarterfinals
5	Paulistano	26	16	10	2209	2098	+111	Qualification to playoffs first round

Updated to match(es) played on March 26, 2019. Source:

===== Results summary =====
Round	1	2	3	4	5	6	7	8	9	10	11	12	13	14	15	16	17	18	19	20	21	22	23	24	25	26
Ground	A	A	H	A	H	H	H	A	H	A	A	H	A	A	A	H	A	A	H	H	H	A	H	A	H	H
Result	W	W	W	L	W	L	W	W	W	W	L															
Position	1	1	1	2	1	2	2	1	2	2	3															

Last updated: November 11, 2018.
Source: Competitive matches
Ground: A = Away; H = Home; R = Rest. Result: L = Loss; W = Win; R = Rest; P = Postponed.

==== Matches ====
13 October 2018 1	Basquete Cearense	54–73	Flamengo	Fortaleza, Brazil
18:00 UTC−03:00	Scoring by quarter: 17-23, 9-16, 13-14, 15-20
Facebook Live	Pts: Alex 15; Rebs: Kurtz 9 Asts: Brite, Alex 3 Eff: Kurtz 15	Boxscore	Pts: Marquinhos 21; Rebs: Varejão 11; Asts: Balbi 6 Eff: Marquinhos 19	Arena: CFO; Attendance: 5.734; Referees: Jonas Pereira, Breno Da Silva, Gregory Gracia

15 October 2018 2	Universo/Brasília	69–94	Flamengo	Brasília, Brazil
20:00 UTC−03:00	Scoring by quarter: 19-27, 16-22, 22-27, 12-18
Facebook Live	Pts: Graterol 23; Rebs: Graham, Sánchez, Graterol, Marcelão 4 Asts: Nezinho 7 Eff: Graterol 26	Boxscore	Pts: Olivinha 21; Rebs: Olivinha 8 Asts: Balbi 6 Eff: Olivinha 21	Arena: Nilson Nelson; Attendance: 2.841; Referees: Fernando Serpa, Jacob Barreto, Rodrigo de Moraes

17 October 2018 3	Flamengo	76–75	Joinville/AABJ	Rio de Janeiro, Brazil
20:30 UTC−03:00	Scoring by quarter: 12-22, 26-25, 22-11, 16-17
Twitter Live	Pts: Deryk 15; Rebs: Mineiro, Marquinhos, Nesbitt 7 Asts: Deryk, Balbi 5 Eff: Mineiro 16	Boxscore	Pts: Vezarinho 15; Rebs: Mathias, Socas 9 Asts: Socas 6 Eff: Vezaro 16	Arena: Carioca Arena 1 Attendance: 792; Referees: Marcos Ferreira, Gustavo Mathias, Davi de Souza

30 October 2018 5	Flamengo	93–73	Mogi das Cruzes/Helbor	Rio de Janeiro, Brazil
20:30 UTC−03:00	Scoring by quarter: 21-16, 20-21, 23-16, 29-20
ESPN	Pts: Jhonatan 23; Rebs: Olivinha 7 Asts: Rossetto 8 Eff: Jhonatan 29	Boxscore	Pts: Deodato 23; Rebs: Batista 9 Asts: Shamell 5 Eff: Deodato 21	Arena: Carioca Arena 1 Attendance: 593; Referees: Jacob Barreto, Gustavo Mathias, Bruno Oliveira

1 November 2018 6	Flamengo	61–74	Pinheiros	Rio de Janeiro, Brazil
20:30 UTC−03:00	Scoring by quarter: 14-19, 19-17, 9-16, 19-22
BandSports	Pts: Balbi 18; Rebs: Nesbitt 7 Asts: Balbi 5 Eff: Balbi 18	Boxscore	Pts: Dawkins 15; Rebs: Toledo 8 Asts: Dawkins 7 Eff: Dawkins, Toledo 21	Arena: Carioca Arena 1 Attendance: 834; Referees: Marcos Benito, Fabio Kover, Davi de Souza

3 November 2018 7	Flamengo	72–64	Corinthians	Rio de Janeiro, Brazil
14:00 UTC−03:00	Scoring by quarter: 23-6, 10-23, 15-15, 24-20
Band	Pts: Marquinhos 16; Rebs: Mineiro, Varejão 7 Asts: Balbi 6 Eff: Marquinhos 15	Boxscore	Pts: Fuller 22; Rebs: Humberto 8 Asts: Fischer, Teichmann 3 Eff: Fuller 21	Arena: Carioca Arena 1 Attendance: 1.545; Referees: Fernando Oliveira, Maria Moraes, Cauan Santos

6 November 2018 8	Sendi/Bauru Basket	47–77	Flamengo	Bauru, Brazil
20:00 UTC−03:00	Scoring by quarter: 7-17, 15-22, 18-20, 7-18
ESPN	Pts: Jefferson 9 Rebs: Verzola, Lucas Mariano 5 Asts: Basílio 3	Boxscore	Pts: Olivinha 14; Rebs: Varejão 11; Asts: Crescenzi 4	Arena: Ginásio Panela de Pressão; Attendance: 770; Referees: Jacob Barreto, Andreia Silva, Leandro Sehnem

8 November 2018 4	SESI Franca	84–77	Flamengo	Franca, Brazil
20:45 UTC−03:00	Scoring by quarter: 15-21, 28-17, 15-17, 26-22
BandSports	Pts: David Jackson 22; Rebs: David Jackson, Lucas Dias 6 Asts: Alexey 6 Eff: David Jackson 23	Boxscore	Pts: Deryk 18; Rebs: Marquinhos, Mineiro, Rossetto 6 Asts: Marquinhos, Balbi, Rossetto 3 Eff: Marquinhos 18	Arena: Pedrocão; Referees: Jonas Pereira, Fabiano Huber, Bruno Oliveira

10 November 2018 9	Flamengo	90–70	Vasco	Rio de Janeiro, Brazil
14:00 UTC−03:00	Scoring by quarter: 20-9, 31-15, 22-19, 17-27
Band	Pts: Olivinha 18; Rebs: Olivinha 10; Asts: Deryk 6 Eff: Olivinha 26	Boxscore	Pts: Gemerson, Alexei, Duda 14; Rebs: Gemerson 8 Asts: Pilar 6 Eff: Alexei 13	Arena: Carioca Arena 1 Attendance: 891; Referees: Marcos Ferreira, Diego Chiconato, Gregório Lelis

14 November 2018 10	São José	57–64	Flamengo	São José dos Campos, Brazil
20:00 UTC−03:00	Scoring by quarter: 22-15, 8-19, 14-11, 13-19
Twitter Live	Pts: Nunes, Dornelles, Pedro 8 Rebs: Nunes 9 Asts: Hélio 5 Eff: Nunes 15	Boxscore	Pts: Jhonatan 18; Rebs: Varejão 8 Asts: Balbi, Rossetto 4 Eff: Jhonatan 20	Arena: Ginásio Lineu de Moura; Referees: Guilherme Locatelli, Fabio Kover, Gregory Garcia

16 November 2018 11	Corpore Paulistano	97–84	Flamengo	São Paulo, Brazil
19:30 UTC−03:00	Scoring by quarter: 16-23, 34-18, 25-17, 22-26
Fox Sports	Pts: Roquemore 24; Rebs: Meindl 10; Asts: Yago 7 Eff: Roquemore, Yago 25	Boxscore	Pts: Olivinha 28; Rebs: Balbi 5 Asts: Balbi 9 Eff: Olivinha 25	Arena: Ginásio Antônio Prado Junior; Referees: Cristiano Maranho, Mauricio Serour, Ramiro Inchauspe

7 December 2018 12	Flamengo	vs.	Botafogo	Rio de Janeiro, Brazil
20:30 UTC−03:00
				Arena: Tijuca Tênis Clube

15 December 2018 13	Minas	vs.	Flamengo	Belo Horizonte, Brazil
17:00 UTC−03:00
				Arena: Arena Minas T.C.

12 January 2019 14	Corinthians	vs.	Flamengo	São Paulo, Brazil
14:00 UTC−03:00
				Arena: Ginásio Wlamir Marques

13 January 2019 15	Pinheiros	vs.	Flamengo	São Paulo, Brazil
20:00 UTC−03:00
				Arena: Poliesportivo Henrique Villaboim

18 January 2019 16	Flamengo	vs.	São José	Rio de Janeiro, Brazil
20:00 UTC−03:00
				Arena: Carioca Arena 1

24 January 2019 17	Joinville/AABJ	vs.	Flamengo	Joinville, Brazil
19:00 UTC−03:00
				Arena: Centreventos Cau Hansen

26 January 2019 18	Mogi das Cruzes/Helbor	vs.	Flamengo	Mogi das Cruzes, Brazil
14:00 UTC−03:00
				Arena: Ginásio Professor Hugo Ramos

1 February 2019 19	Flamengo	vs.	Corpore Paulistano	Rio de Janeiro, Brazil
20:30 UTC−03:00
				Arena: Carioca Arena 1

5 February 2019 20	Flamengo	vs.	SESI Franca	Rio de Janeiro, Brazil
20:30 UTC−03:00
				Arena: Carioca Arena 1

16 February 2019 21	Flamengo	vs.	Sendi/Bauru Basket	Rio de Janeiro, Brazil
20:30 UTC−03:00
				Arena: Carioca Arena 1

28 February 2019 22	Botafogo	vs.	Flamengo	Rio de Janeiro, Brazil
20:00 UTC−03:00
				Arena: Ginásio Oscar Zelaya

8 March 2019 23	Flamengo	vs.	Minas	Rio de Janeiro, Brazil
20:30 UTC−03:00
				Arena: Carioca Arena 1

16 March 2019 24	Vasco	vs.	Flamengo	Rio de Janeiro, Brazil
14:00 UTC−03:00
				Arena: Ginásio São Januário

24 March 2019 25	Flamengo	vs.	Universo/Brasília	Rio de Janeiro, Brazil
11:00 UTC−03:00
				Arena: Carioca Arena 1

26 March 2019 26	Flamengo	vs.	Basquete Cearense	Rio de Janeiro, Brazil
20:00 UTC−03:00
				Arena: Carioca Arena 1

==== Results overview ====
Win Loss

Opposition	Home score	Away score	Double
Basquete Cearense		73-54	
Botafogo			
Corinthians	72-64		
Corpore Paulistano		84-97	
Joinville/AABJ	76-75		
Minas			
Mogi das Cruzes/Helbor	93-73		
Pinheiros	61-74		
São José		64-57	
Sendi/Bauru Basket		77-47	
SESI Franca		77-84	
Universo/Brasília		94-69	
Vasco	90-70		

=== Season records ===
Competition	Regular season				Playoffs				Totals			
Competition	G	W	L	PCT	G	W	L	PCT	G	W	L	PCT
Rio de Janeiro State Championship	6	6	0	1.000	4	4	0	1.000	10	10	0	1.000
NBB	11	8	3	.727	0	0	0	–	11	8	3	.727
Liga Sudamericana	3	3	0	1.000	0	0	0	–	3	3	0	1.000
Totals	20	17	3	.850	4	4	0	1.000	24	21	3	.875
