= Davi Rossetto =

Brazilian basketball player (born 1992)

Minas
- Position: Point guard
- League: NBB

Personal information
- Born: July 27, 1992 (age 34) São Paulo, Brazil
- Listed height: 6 ft 1 in (1.85 m)
- Listed weight: 185 lb (84 kg)

Career information
- Playing career: 2010–present

Career history
- 2010–2012: Pinheiros
- 2012–2018: Basquete Cearense
- 2018–2019: Flamengo
- 2018–present: Minas

Career highlights
- NBB champion (2019); All-NBB Team (2016); 2× NBB All-Star Game (2016, 2017); NBB Most Improved Player (2015); Brazilian Developmental League champion (2015); Brazilian Developmental League Finals MVP (2015); São Paulo State champion (2011)

Davi Rossetto de Oliveira Athayde, (born July 27, 1992) is a Brazilian professional basketball player who currently plays with Minas in the Novo Basquete Brasil (NBB). He is 6-foot-1-inch (1.85 m) and plays as a point guard.

== Youth career ==
Rossetto started playing with São Paulo's Hebraica in 2003, at the age of 10. He later played with Círculo Militar until joining the Pinheiros youth system in 2005. With the Pinheiros youth teams, Rossetto won a number of titles, and earned a respectable reputation. He made the U-17 national team in 2009.

== Professional career ==
=== Pinheiros ===
Rossetto started playing with the men's first team of Pinheiros in the 2010 season and was a part of the club's Paulista State Championship winning side in 2011. He subsequently left, looking for more playing time.

=== Solar Cearense ===
Rossetto signed with Solar Cearense in 2012. During his first season in Fortaleza, he struggled to adapt and did not see the court much. In his second season, he alternated between the first team, in the NBB, and the Under-22 side in the Development League. The team lost to Bauru in the NBB's playoff quarterfinals. In the LDB, despite being eliminated in the final round, he finished as the game's assist leader.

In the 2014–15 season, Rossetto improved his play and won the NBB's Most Improved Player award, despite his team missing the playoffs. He also won the LDB title with the club's Under-22 side in a perfect season campaign (28–0). He was named the development league's Finals MVP.

=== Flamengo ===
On July 10, 2018, Rossetto signed with Flamengo for the 2018–19 NBB season.

=== Minas Tênis Clube ===
On July 5, 2019, Rossetto signed with Minas for the 2019–20 NBB season.

== National team career ==
Rossetto has previously been a member of the senior Brazilian national basketball team. He played at the 2017 FIBA AmeriCup.
