= David Nesbitt =

Bahamian basketball player (born 1991)

Boca Juniors
- Position: Power forward
- League: Liga Nacional de Básquet

Personal information
- Born: February 10, 1991 (age 35) Freeport, The Bahamas
- Listed height: 6 ft 8.75 in (2.05 m)
- Listed weight: 234 lb (106 kg)

Career information
- High school: Grand Bahama Catholic (Freeport, The Bahamas)
- College: Grayson (2008–2009); St. Thomas (FL) (2009–2012)
- NBA draft: 2012: undrafted
- Playing career: 2012–present

Career history
- 2013–2014: Kaspiy Aktau
- 2014–2016: Al Mina
- 2016–2017: Goes Montevideo
- 2017: Ciclista Olímpico
- 2017–2018: Paulistano
- 2018–2019: Flamengo
- 2019–2020: Corinthians
- 2020–2021: Minas
- 2021–present: Boca Juniors

Career highlights
- 2x NBB champion (2018, 2019); São Paulo State champion (2017); Rio de Janeiro State champion (2018); NBB Super 8 Cup winner (2018)

David Ahmad Nesbitt (born February 10, 1991) is a Bahamian professional basketball player who currently plays for Boca Juniors of the Liga Nacional de Básquet. At a height of 2.05 m (6 ft 8 3/4 in) tall, and a weight of 106 kg (234 lb) he plays at the power forward position.

== College career ==
After playing college basketball at Grayson College, from 2008 to 2009, Nesbitt played college basketball at St. Thomas University, with the St. Thomas Bobcats, from 2009 to 2012.

== Professional career ==
Nesbitt won the top-tier level Brazilian League championship with C.A. Paulistano, in 2018. He joined Corinthians in 2019. Nesbitt averaged 12.5 points, 6.5 rebounds, 1.7 assists and 1.0 steal per game. On August 15, 2020, he signed with Minas. He averaged 10.4 points, 5.5 rebounds, and 1.7 assists per game. On July 29, 2021, Nesbitt signed with Boca Juniors of the Liga Nacional de Básquet.

== National team career ==
Nesbitt represented the senior Bahamian national basketball team at the 2016 Centrobasket, where he recorded the most minutes played for his team. He was also the Bahamas' best three point shooter during the tournament.
