= Jhonatan Luz =

Brazilian basketball player (born 1987)

No. 7 – Osasco basquete
- Position: Small forward / power forward
- League: NBB

Personal information
- Born: February 10, 1987 (age 39) Osasco, Brazil
- Listed height: 6 ft 5 in (1.96 m)
- Listed weight: 203 lb (92 kg)

Career history
- –: Málaga
- –: CB Guadalajara
- –: AB Mérida
- 2009–2010: Araraquara
- 2010–2012: Limeira
- 2012–2014: Franca
- 2014–2015: Palmeiras
- 2015–2018: Paulistano
- 2018–2021: Flamengo
- 2021–2024: Franca
- 2024–2026: Flamengo

Career highlights
- FIBA Intercontinental Cup champion (2023); 2× NBB champion (2018, 2019, 2022, 2023); Rio de Janeiro State champion (2018); NBB Super 8 Cup winner (2018); São Paulo State champion (2017)

Jhonatan Luz dos Santos (born February 10, 1987), also known mononymously as Jhonathan, is a Brazilian professional basketball player. He currently plays with Flamengo of the Novo Basquete Brasil (NBB) from Brazil.

== Professional career ==
Luz started his professional career in Spain with Málaga and later played for Guadalajara, Mérida before returning to Brazil in 2009. Following stints with Araraquara and Limeira, he joined Franca in 2012.

Luz then also played for Palmeiras, Paulistano and Flamengo, before returning to Franca for a second stint in 2021.

In September 2023, Luz won the 2023 FIBA Intercontinental Cup with Franca.
