= Liga de Desenvolvimento de Basquete =

Liga de Desenvolvimento de Basquete (LDB) Developmental Basketball League
- Formerly: Liga de Desenvolvimento Olímpico (LDO)
- Founded: 2011
- Country: Brazil
- Number of teams: 22
- Current champions: Bauru
- Most championships: (São Paulo (state)) Pinheiros (3 title)
- CEO: Cássio Roque
- TV partners: SporTV
- Website: lnb.com.br/ldb
- 2021 LDB

Liga de Desenvolvimento de Basquete (LDB) (English: Developmental Basketball League) is an Under-20 age version of the top-tier level Brazilian men's professional basketball league, the Novo Basquete Brasil (NBB). The players need to be 20 years old and under to play in this tournament. It is a way to discover new players for future Brazilian national team generations, and for new young talents to be developed for the main teams of the Novo Basquete Brasil (NBB).

However, not all the teams that make up the NBB also compete in the LDB, due to not having competitive teams in the lower Brazilian basketball league categories. So some teams focus instead on the training of their young athletes, or participate as guests, and can still help to produce good future players for Brazilian basketball. LDB receives support from the Brazilian Federal Government to be organized.

== Format ==
The LDB was an Under-21 competition in the 2011–12 season, an Under-22 competition from the 2012–13 season to the 2016–17 season, and has been and Under-20 competition since the 2017–18 season. In 2020-21, the competition returned to Under-22. It is organized according to the rules of FIBA for international competitions: the participating teams are divided into groups of 8 teams each. The teams in each group play against each other, and the three best teams from each group qualify to advance to the next phase, which is a 6 team group stage. The top four teams of that group then advance to the Final Four. The best team of the Final Four is crowned the champion.

== LDB Finals ==
Year	Host (Final four)	Winners	Runners-up	Third Place	Fourth Place	Number of teams
2011; Details	(Rio de Janeiro (state)) Rio de Janeiro	(Rio de Janeiro (state)) Flamengo	(São Paulo (state)) Bauru	(São Paulo (state)) Paulistano	(Federal District (Brazil)) Brasília	16
2012; Details	(Federal District (Brazil)) Brasília	(São Paulo (state)) Bauru	(São Paulo (state)) Franca	(Rio de Janeiro (state)) Flamengo	(São Paulo (state)) São José	16
2013; Details	(Rio de Janeiro (state)) Rio de Janeiro	(Rio de Janeiro (state)) Flamengo	(Minas Gerais) Minas	(São Paulo (state)) Pinheiros	(Federal District (Brazil)) Brasília	16
2014; Details	(Ceará) Fortaleza	(Ceará) Basquete Cearense	(Rio de Janeiro (state)) Flamengo	(São Paulo (state)) Limeira	(São Paulo (state)) Pinheiros	16
2015; Details	(Minas Gerais) Belo Horizonte	(São Paulo (state)) Pinheiros	(Minas Gerais) Minas	(Pernambuco) Sport	(Federal District (Brazil)) Brasília	16
2016; Details	(São Paulo (state)) São Bernardo do Campo	(São Paulo (state)) Franca	(São Paulo (state)) São José	(São Paulo (state)) São Bernardo	(São Paulo (state)) Limeira	16
2017-18; Details	(São Paulo (state)) São Paulo	(São Paulo (state)) Paulistano	(São Paulo (state)) Franca	(São Paulo (state)) São José	(São Paulo (state)) Pinheiros	16
2018; Details	(São Paulo (state)) São Paulo	(São Paulo (state)) Pinheiros	(São Paulo (state)) Paulistano	(São Paulo (state)) Palmeiras	(Rio de Janeiro (state)) Flamengo	16
2019; Details	(São Paulo (state)) São Paulo	(São Paulo (state)) Pinheiros	(São Paulo (state)) Franca	(São Paulo (state)) Paulistano	(Rio de Janeiro (state)) Flamengo	16
2020; Details	Canceled COVID-19 pandemic					
2021; Details	(São Paulo (state)) São Paulo (Rio de Janeiro (state)) Rio de Janeiro (Paraná (state)) Curitiba					22

=== MVP by edition ===
Season	MVP	Team
2011; Details	(Brazil); Fred Duarte	(Rio de Janeiro (state)) Flamengo
2012–13; Details	(Brazil); Gui Deodato	(São Paulo (state)) Bauru
