= Wesley Sena =

Brazilian professional basketball player (born 1996)

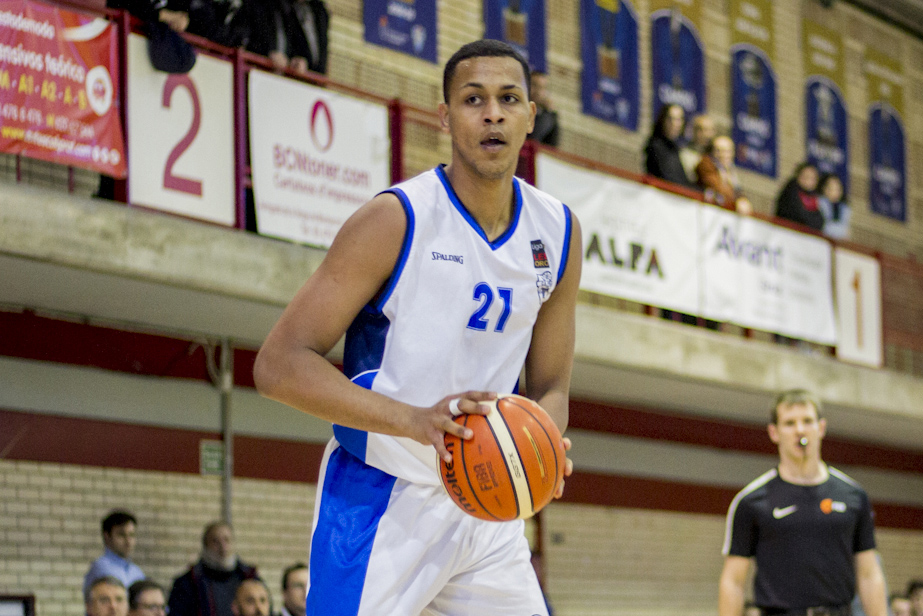

No. 21 – Caxias do Sul
- Position: pivot
- League: Novo Basquete Brasil

Personal information
- Born: May 2, 1996 (age 29) Campinas, Brazil
- Listed height: 2.11 m (6 ft 11 in)
- Listed weight: 118 kg (260 lb)

Career information
- Playing career: 2012–present

Career history
- 2012–2014: Palmeiras
- 2014–2016: Bauru
- 2016: FC Barcelona Lassa
- 2016–2017: →FC Barcelona Lassa B
- 2017: Contagem Towers
- 2017–2018: Mogi das Cruzes
- 2018-2019: CB Prat
- 2019–2020: Botafogo
- 2020-2021: ECP
- 2021–2022: Caxias

Career highlights
- FIBA Americas League champion (2015); FIBA South American League champion (2014)

Wesley Alexandre Sena da Silva (born May 2, 1996) is a Brazilian professional basketball player who currently plays for Caxias do Sul in the NBB.

== Professional career ==
Sena played for Palmeiras, seeing action in the top-tier of Brazilian basketball, the NBB, until 2014 and then made the switch to fellow NBB outfit Bauru. With Bauru, he won the 2014 Liga Sudamericana de Básquetbol and the 2015 FIBA Americas League.

He was an early entry candidate for the 2016 NBA draft, but later removed his name from the list. The same year, at age 20, he signed for FC Barcelona of the Spanish ACB. To begin with, he jumped between Barça’s first team and their reserve team, that plays in LEB Oro.

On 23 October 2016, Sena made his debut in Liga ACB. He played three minutes and scored one point in Barcelona's 80–58 win over Real Betis Energía Plus.

In February 2017, Sena left FC Barcelona Lassa by mutual consent. He saw action in only one ACB game for Barcelona, while being a regular in the reserve side, averaging 6.8 points and 3.3 rebounds a contest.

In March 2017, he joined the Contagem Towers of the Liga Ouro de Basquete in his native Brazil.

On August 8, 2018, Sena signed with CB Prat of the LEB Oro.

In december 2019, Wesley Sena was part of the champion cast players of the Botafogo, on league sul-american of basketball.

In October 2021, Wesley Sena was hired to play for Caxias do Sul Basquete, on NBB.

== National team career ==
Sena has represented his country in international junior competition, competing with Brazil in the 2013 U17 South America Championship and the 2014 U18 FIBA Americas.
