= Deryk Ramos =

Brazilian professional basketball player

No. 3 – Caxias do Sul
- Position: Point guard / shooting guard
- League: NBB

Personal information
- Born: June 14, 1994 (age 32) Limeira, São Paulo, Brazil
- Listed height: 6 ft 2 in (1.88 m)
- Listed weight: 188 lb (85 kg)

Career information
- NBA draft: 2016: undrafted
- Playing career: 2010–present

Career history
- 2010–2015: Limeira
- 2015–2017: Brasília
- 2017–2018: Paulistano
- 2018–2020: Flamengo
- 2020–2021: Paulistano
- 2021–2022: Pinheiros
- 2022–present: Caxias do Sul

Career highlights
- FIBA South American League champion (2015); FIBA South American League MVP (2015); 2× NBB champion (2018, 2019); NBB Super 8 Cup winner (2018); NBB Most Improved Player (2016); NBB Sixth Man of the Year (2018); NBB Revelation Player (2015); 2× NBB All-Star Game (2016, 2017); 2× São Paulo State champion (2010, 2017); Rio de Janeiro State champion (2018)

Deryk Evandro Ramos (born June 14, 1994), also commonly known simply as Deryk, is a Brazilian professional basketball player. He currently plays with Caxias do Sul of the Novo Basquete Brasil (NBB). At a height of 1.88 m (6 ft 2 in) tall, he plays at the point guard and shooting guard positions.

== Professional career ==
During his pro club career, Ramos has played in South America's top professional basketball league, the FIBA South American League, and Latin America's top professional basketball league, the FIBA Americas League. He was named the MVP of the FIBA South American League's 2015 season.

== National team career ==
Ramos represented the senior Brazilian national basketball team at the 2015 FIBA AmeriCup, in Mexico City.
