= 2017–18 NBB season =

Brazilian basketball league

Novo Basquete Brasil
- Season: 2017–18
- Dates: 04 November 2017 – 29 March 2018 (Regular season)
- Teams: 15
- TV partner(s): Band SporTV Facebook Live Twitter

Regular season
- Season MVP: Marquinhos Vieira
- Relegated: Liga Sorocabana; Campo Mourão

Finals
- Champions: Paulistano
- Runners-up: Mogi das Cruzes/Helbor
- Semifinalists: Flamengo; Sendi/Bauru Basket
- Finals MVP: Guilherme Hubner

The 2017–18 NBB season was the 9th season of the Novo Basquete Brasil, the Brazilian basketball league. Once again this tournament was organized entirely by the Liga Nacional de Basquete (LNB). The NBB also qualified teams for international tournaments such as Liga Sudamericana and FIBA Americas League.

This season fifteen teams played each other in the regular season. At the end of the home and away matches round the top four teams qualified for the quarterfinals of the playoffs automatically, while the teams finishing in the 5th and 12th place participated in the first round of the playoffs to determine the other four teams in the quarterfinals, in a five-match series. This season maintained 16/17's playoff method of best of 5 games, played on the 1-2-1-1 format.

For this season, the last regular season placed team is relegated to the 2019 Liga Ouro, the NBB's second tier division. Also, only the 2018 Liga Ouro winner receives the right to play in the NBB 2019–20 season.

== Participating teams ==
Team	Home city	Stadium	Capacity	Appearance	Last regular season	Last season playoffs	NBB Titles (Last title)
Basquete Cearense	Fortaleza	Ginásio Paulo Sarasate	8,200	8th	9h	Round of 16	0
Sendi/Bauru Basket	Bauru	Ginásio Panela de Pressão	2,000	10th	5th	Champions	1 (2016–17)
Botafogo	Rio de Janeiro	Ginásio Oscar Zelaya	850	1st	-	-	0
Campo Mourão Basquete	Campo Mourão	Ginásio de Esportes Belin Carolo	3,000	2nd	10th	Round of 16	-
Banrisul Caxias do Sul	Caxias do Sul	Ginásio Vasco da Gama	850	1st	-	-	-
Flamengo	Rio de Janeiro	Arena Carioca 1	6,000	11th	1st	Semifinals	5 (2015–16)
Sesi/Franca	Franca	Ginásio Pedrocão	6,000	11th	3rd	Quarterfinals	0
Joinville/AABJ	Joinville	Centreventos Cau Hansen	4,000	2nd	13th	DNQ	0
Liga Sorocabana	Sorocaba	Ginásio Gualberto Moreira	3,000	6th	13th	DNQ	0
Minas	Belo Horizonte	Juscelino Kubitschek Arena	4,000	11th	9th	Quarterfinals	0
Mogi das Cruzes/Helbor	Mogi das Cruzes	Ginásio Municipal Professor Hugo Ramos	5,000	7th	4th	Runner-up	0
Paulistano	São Paulo	Ginásio Antônio Prado Junior	1,500	11th	2nd	Champions	0
Pinheiros	São Paulo	Poliesportivo Henrique Villaboim	854	11th	7th	Play-off First Round	0
São José	São José dos Campos	Lineu Moura	2.260	9th	2nd (Liga Ouro)	DNP	0
Vasco da Gama	Rio de Janeiro	Ginásio Vasco da Gama	1,000	3rd	11th	Play-off First Round	0
Universo Vitória	Salvador	Ginásio Poliesportivo de Cajazeiras Fazenda	2.060	2nd	12th	Round of 16	0

== Regular season ==
The regular season began on Saturday, November 04, 2017 13:35 UTC−03:00 at Ginásio Antônio Prado Junior, home of Club Athletico Paulistano, who was defeated 72–71 by Sendi/Bauru Basket. The regular season ended on March 29, 2018.

=== Standings ===
The standings are updated according to the LNB official website table.

=== Results ===
Home \ Away	CEA	BAU	BOT	CAM	CAX	FLA	FRA	JLE	LSB	MIN	MOG	CAP	PIN	VAS	VIT
Basquete Cearense	—	81–80	61–47	77–69	67–76	75–92	75–73	80–66	83–64	66–58	82–80	60–81	66–64	85–76	78–77
Sendi/Bauru Basket	87–82	—	103–78	82–80	73–85	71–97	60–81	88–41	95–73	89–70	75–76	72–71	85–84	83–88	77–66
Botafogo	70–68	60–77	—	67–64	76–67	84–90	63–67	88–77	70–64	70–76	65–70	74–93	73–81	87–94	94–74
Campo Mourão Basquete	60–66	59–97	71–60	—	63–84	82–89	60–88	72–75	72–76	69–77	69–97	66–111	60–64	79–89	65–72
Banrisul Caxias do Sul	67–60	70–69	73–63	75–66	—	75–85	80=86	72–63	82–66	71–91	66–65	81=80	71–86	81–69	79–78
Flamengo	87–85	75–61	107–54	92–69	79–69	—	86–66	86–75	82–67	96–84	77–71	71–72	72–68	89–81	89–75
Sesi/Franca	79–59	87–83	104–67	73–77	82–74	100–82	—	72–56	74–67	75–55	75–73	97–73	87–79	93–61	68–55
Joinville/AABJ	73–59	71–97	68–63	83–81	70–76	81–91	66–59	—	77–75	66–73	61–67	66–86	82–90	74–94	52–68
Liga Sorocabana de Basquete	91–76	81–89	68–75	63–68	71–74	63–70	79–87	51–64	—	54–75	69–74	75–78	75–77	68–75	80–75
Minas TC	75–63	66–81	74–56	74–81	86–84	76–83	65–84	69–52	71–61	—	65–82	80–88	80–75	82–81	80–78
Mogi das Cruzes/Helbor	80–62	72–69	84–70	72–69	76–75	72–75	72–71	77–67	82–73	76–39	—	80–84	69–84	89–80	80–75
Paulistano	96–84	88–79	112–64	92–67	88–70	72–67	88–74	75–64	84–59	93–86	84–67	—	73–72	102–59	84–66
Pinheiros	92–79	77–93	80–77	80–51	90–75	67–78	77–90	108–59	80–69	62–64	66–73	81–65	—	72–76	80–77
Vasco da Gama	96–92	86–87	72–68	84–59	70–87	75–89	67–81	83–56	76–68	70–54	75–82	71–77	71–82	—	85–89
Universo Vitória	89–68	82–77	86–76	88–79	70–69	68–76	85–92	88–68	95–69	82–57	77–72	68–90	79–76	77–75	—

Updated to match(es) played on May 16, 2019. Source:
Legend: Blue = home team win; Yellow = draw; Red = away team win.

== Playoffs ==
First Round (Best of 5)
(8) Universo Vitória	2
(9) Minas	3
(5) Banrisul Caxias do Sul	3
(12) Botafogo	0
(7) Pinheiros	1
(10) Basquete Cearense	3
(6) Sendi/Bauru Basket	3
(11) Vasco da Gama	1

Quarter-Finals (Best of 5)
(1) Flamengo	3
(9) Minas	0
(4) Mogi das Cruzes/Helbor	3
(12) Banrisul Caxias do Sul	1
(2) Paulistano	3
(10) Basquete Cearense	1
(3) SESI Franca	0
(6) Sendi/Bauru Basket	3

Semi-Finals (Best of 5)
(1) Flamengo	1
(4) Mogi das Cruzes/Helbor	3
(2) Paulistano	3
(6) Sendi/Bauru Basket	2

NBB Finals (Best of 5)
(2) Paulistano	3
(4) Mogi das Cruzes/Helbor	1

== Awards ==
=== Season awards ===
- Most Valuable Player: Marquinhos Vieira (3)
- Sixth Man of the Year Award: Deryk Ramos
- Defensive Player of the Year Award: Jimmy de Oliveira (2)
- Most Improved Player of the Year Award: Wesley Ferreira
- NBB Coach of the Year (Ary Vidal Trophy): Gustavo de Conti (3)
- NBB's Revelation Player of the Year: Gabriel Jaú
- NBB Finals MVP Award: Guilherme Hubner
