= 2018–19 NBB season =

Brazilian basketball league

Novo Basquete Brasil
- Season: 2018–19
- Dates: 13 October 2018 – 26 March 2019 (Regular season)
- Teams: 14
- TV partner: Band ESPN Brasil Fox Sports Facebook Live Twitter

Regular season
- Relegated: Joinville/AABJ

Finals
- Champions: Flamengo (6th title)
- Runners-up: Sesi/Franca
- Semi-finalists: Botafogo; Mogi das Cruzes/Helbor

The 2018–19 Novo Basquete Brasil (NBB) season is the 11th season of this top-tier level Brazilian professional basketball league. This tournament is organized by the Liga Nacional de Basquete (LNB). The NBB will also qualify teams for international tournaments such as the FIBA South American League (LSB) and FIBA Americas League.

In this season, fourteen teams will play during the regular season. At the end of the season's home and away games, the top four league teams qualify for the quarterfinal playoffs, while the teams finishing in the 5th through 12th places will participate in playoffs to determine the other four teams in the quarterfinals. The quarterfinals are played in a best out of five series since the NBB 2015–16 season.

For this season, the last regular season placed team is relegated to the 2020 Liga Ouro, the NBB's second tier division. Also, only the 2019 Liga Ouro winner receives the right to play in the NBB 2019–20 season.

== Broadcasting rights ==
For the first time since its inception in 2009, the NBB will have 4 TV broadcasting partners, along with live game transmissions at the official competition pages on Facebook and Twitter.

The league's weekly broadcasting calendar runs as follows:

Monday: 1 live game on Facebook
Tuesday: 1 or 2 live games on ESPN Brasil
Wednesday: 1 live game on Twitter
Thursday: 1 live game on Band Sports
Friday: 1 live game on Fox Sports
Saturday: 1 or 2 live games on Band plus extra night games on other channels

== Participating teams ==
New teams in the league

- Corinthians (2018 Liga Ouro champions, promoted)
- São José (2018 Liga Ouro runners-up, invited)

Teams that were relegated last season

- Campo Mourão
- Liga Sorocabana

Teams that left the league

- Caxias do Sul

Team relocation

Universo/Vitória moved from Salvador, to the capital Brasília, after the end of the previous season. Universo/Vitória, despite being located in the same city, playing in the same arena, and having the same investors, is not the same Brasília team that won the NBB championship three times in the past. That franchise ended after the 2016–17 NBB season.

Team	Home city	Stadium	Capacity	Head coach	Appearance	Last regular season	Last season playoffs	NBB Titles (Last title)
Basquete Cearense	Fortaleza	Ginásio Paulo Sarasate	8,200	(Brazil) Dannyel Russo	7th	10th	Quarterfinals	0
Sendi/Bauru Basket	Bauru	Ginásio Panela de Pressão	2,000	(Brazil) Demétrius Ferracciú	11th	6th	Semifinals	1 (2016–17)
Botafogo	Rio de Janeiro	Ginásio Oscar Zelaya	850	(Brazil) Leonardo Alves	2nd	12th	Play-off First Round	0
Corinthians	São Paulo	Ginásio Wlamir Marques	7,000	(Brazil) Bruno Savignani	1st	1st (Liga Ouro)	DNP	0
Flamengo	Rio de Janeiro	Arena Carioca 1	6,000	(Brazil) Gustavo de Conti	11th	1st	Semifinals	5 (2015–16)
Sesi/Franca	Franca	Ginásio Pedrocão	6,000	(Brazil) Helinho	11th	3rd	Quarterfinals	0
Joinville/AABJ	Joinville	Centreventos Cau Hansen	4,000	(Brazil) George Rodrigues	2nd	13th	DNQ	0
Minas Storm	Belo Horizonte	Juscelino Kubitschek Arena	4,000	(Brazil) Espiga	11th	9th	Quarterfinals	0
Mogi das Cruzes/Helbor	Mogi das Cruzes	Ginásio Municipal Professor Hugo Ramos	5,000	(Brazil) Guerrinha	7th	4th	Runner-up	0
Paulistano	São Paulo	Ginásio Antônio Prado Junior	1,500	(Brazil) Régis Marelli	11th	2nd	Champions	1 (2017–18)
Pinheiros	São Paulo	Poliesportivo Henrique Villaboim	854	(Brazil) César Guidetti	11th	7th	Play-off First Round	0
São José	São José dos Campos	Lineu Moura	2,260	(Brazil) Cristiano Ahmed	9th	2nd (Liga Ouro)	DNP	0
Universo/Caixa/Brasília	Brasília	Ginásio Nilson Nelson	16,000	(Brazil) André Germano	9th	8th	Play-off First Round	0
Vasco da Gama	Rio de Janeiro	Ginásio Vasco da Gama	1,000	(Brazil) Alberto Bial	3rd	11th	Play-off First Round	0

== Transactions ==
=== Retirement ===
On May 12, 2018, following Flamengo's elimination in the 2017–18 NBB season semifinals, Marcelinho Machado retired from basketball after playing 22 seasons, 12 for Flamengo. Along with teammates Marquinhos and Olivinha, Marcelinho is the player with the most team success in the NBB, having reached the league's final on six occasions. He clinched the title in the 2008–09, 2012–13, 2013–14, 2014–15, and 2015–16 seasons, as well as winning the 2004–05 and 2007–08 CBB titles, the precursor of the NBB. He was also runner-up in the 2009–10 NBB season.

In his career, Marcelinho also won the FIBA South American Basketball League, the FIBA Americas League, and the FIBA Intercontinental Cup, all while playing with Flamengo.

=== Coaching changes ===
Coaching changes
Off-season
Team	2017–18 season	2018–19 season
Flamengo	José Neto	Gustavo de Conti
Paulistano	Gustavo de Conti	Régis Marelli

== Regular season ==
The regular season began on Saturday, October 13, 2018, 13:35 UTC−03:00 at Ginásio Antônio Prado Junior, home of Club Athletico Paulistano, who was defeated 75–85 by Mogi das Cruzes/Helbor. The regular season is scheduled to end on Tuesday, March 26, 2019.

=== Standings ===
Pos	Team	Pld	W	L	PF	PA	PD	Qualification or relegation
1	SESI Franca	26	23	3	2258	1992	+266	Qualification to playoffs quarterfinals
2	Flamengo	26	22	4	2197	1836	+361	Qualification to playoffs quarterfinals
3	Pinheiros	26	21	5	2154	1976	+178	Qualification to playoffs quarterfinals
4	Mogi das Cruzes/Helbor	26	17	9	2195	2095	+100	Qualification to playoffs quarterfinals
5	Paulistano	26	16	10	2209	2098	+111	Qualification to playoffs first round
6	Botafogo	26	12	14	1956	1998	−42	Qualification to playoffs first round
7	Corinthians	26	12	14	2079	2075	+4	Qualification to playoffs first round
8	Sendi/Bauru Basket	26	11	15	2017	2065	−48	Qualification to playoffs first round
9	Minas	26	11	15	2043	2105	−62	Qualification to playoffs first round
10	Universo/Brasília	26	10	16	2022	2182	−160	Qualification to playoffs first round
11	São José	26	9	17	2039	2117	−78	Qualification to playoffs first round
12	Basquete Cearense	26	8	18	1915	2034	−119	Qualification to playoffs first round
13	Vasco da Gama	26	5	21	1933	2235	−302	
14	Joinville/AABJ	26	5	21	1999	2208	−209	Relegation to Liga Ouro

Updated to match(es) played on March 26, 2019. Source:

The standings are updated according to the LNB official website table.

=== Results ===
Home \ Away	CEA	BAU	BOT	COR	FLA	FRA	JLE	MIN	MOG	CAP	PIN	SJO	UBR	VAS
Basquete Cearense	—	82–73	65–54	77–90	54–73	82–91	88–77	70–61	60–73	65–77	79–81	76–86	76–63	66–60
Sendi/Bauru Basket	82–71	—	82–63	92–81	47–77	69–70	84–76	81–68	81–96	85–64	68–75	63–75	75–76	76–80
Botafogo	78–69	74–80	—	86–71	67–73	69–71	62–64	79–62	90–86	77–74	76–91	84–74	79–65	79–74
Corinthians	57–55	87–83	84–77	—	68–91	80–83	92–83	97–82	90–79	83–92	77–80	74–82	91–79	85–72
Flamengo	100–82	80–72	102–73	72–64	—	79–74	76–75	82–60	93–73	95–87	61–74	96–83	97–54	90–70
Sesi/Franca	82–74	88–71	74–77	83–60	84–77	—	84–72	83–66	82–65	89–73	93–78	95–93	83–69	101–75
Joinville/AABJ	72–69	89–56	54–59	72–98	50–89	80–95	—	80–89	84–90	87–97	68–87	87–84	77–84	81–92
Minas Storm	95–85	93–89	85–77	72–69	80–91	86–103	85–73	—	97–99	88–85	83–79	75–80	66–74	93–65
Mogi das Cruzes/Helbor	100–72	73–67	89–72	102–96	74–81	89–95	81–67	65–64	—	89–91	77–83	88–82	97–82	90–88
Paulistano	72–60	74–76	100–104	82–78	97–84	86–93	109–97	81–76	75–85	—	85–91	88–82	83–82	109–65
Pinheiros	88–86	92–81	69–67	76–85	81–73	91–79	92–70	87–75	78–71	71–82	—	88–86	79–61	112–80
São José	92–86	74–83	79–72	61–72	57–64	80–98	102–100	62–71	74–96	65–73	67–83	—	87–75	82–68
Universo/Caixa/Brasília	80–87	105–113	82–64	84–82	69–94	73–101	98–90	88–77	76–80	71–97	81–77	81–73	—	76–77
Vasco da Gama	77–79	82–88	79–97	78–68	67–107	78–84	66–74	81–92	75–88	60–76	65–71	81–77	78–94	—

Updated to match(es) played on March 26, 2019. Source:
Legend: Blue = home team win; Yellow = draw; Red = away team win.

=== Super 8 Cup ===
A new competition on the NBB calendar, the Super 8 Cup consists of a series of single elimination games, played between the top 8 clubs of the regular season during the holiday break. The winner will qualify to the 2019 Americas League, to be played in October 2019.

Quarterfinals
(1) Sesi/Franca	81
(8) São José	71
(4) Mogi das Cruzes/Helbor	72
(5) Paulistano	75
(3) Flamengo	92
(6) Minas Storm	74
(2) Pinheiros	74
(7) Botafogo	79

Semi-finals
Sesi/Franca	79
Paulistano	67
Flamengo	99
Botafogo	88

Final
Sesi/Franca	75
Flamengo	79

== Playoffs ==
First Round (Best of 3)
(8) Sendi/Bauru Basket	2
(9) Minas Storm	1
(5) Paulistano	0
(12) Basquete Cearense	2
(7) Corinthians	2
(10) Brasília	1
(6) Botafogo	2
(11) São José	0

Quarter-Finals (Best of 5)
(1) Franca	3
(8) Sendi/Bauru Basket	0
(4) Mogi das Cruzes/Helbor	3
(12) Basquete Cearense	0
(2) Flamengo	3
(7) Corinthians	0
(3) Pinheiros	2
(6) Botafogo	3

Semi-Finals (Best of 5)
(1) Franca	3
(4) Mogi das Cruzes/Helbor	0
(2) Flamengo	3
(6) Botafogo	1

NBB Finals (Best of 5)
(2) Flamengo	3
(1) Franca	2

== Awards ==
=== Team of the Week ===
Week	Point Guard	Shooting Guard	Small Forward	Power Forward	Center	Sixth Man
Week 1	Bennet	Felipe Vezaro	Isaac	Marquinhos	J. P. Batista	Douglas Santos
Week 2	Fischer	Fuller	David Jackson	Wesley	J. P. Batista	Didi
Week 3	Jamaal	David Jackson	Jefferson	Arthur Bernardi	Kurtz	Sam Daniel

bold player indicate best player of the week

=== Season awards ===
Award	Player	Team
Best Defensive Player	Jimmy de Oliveira	Sesi/Franca
Sixth Man	Alexey Borges	Sesi/Franca
Best Foreigner	Franco Balbi	Flamengo
Most Improved Player	Didi Louzada	Sesi/Franca
Ary Vidal Coach of the Season	Léo Figueiró	Botafogo
Revelation Player	Didi Louzada	Sesi/Franca
Amaury Pasos/Budweiser Finals MVP	Carlos Olivinha	Flamengo
Internet Finals MVP (#MVPdaGalera)	Marquinhos Vieira	Flamengo
Most Valuable Player	J. P. Batista	Mogi das Cruzes/Helbor

== Statistical leaders ==
=== Individual tournament highs ===
Points

Pos.	Name	G	PPG
1	(United States) Kyle Fuller (COR)	32	20.7
2	(United States) Zach Graham (UBR)	25	19.1
3	(Brazil) Leandro Barbosa (MIN)	12	18.4
4	(United States) Shamell Stallworth (MOG)	32	17.2
5	(United States) David Jackson (FRA)	35	16.7

Rebounds

Pos.	Name	G	RPG
1	(Brazil) J. P. Batista (MOG)	32	8.8
2	(Brazil) Gemerson (VAS)	20	8.0
3	(Venezuela) Windi Graterol (UBR)	29	7.9
4	(Brazil) Thiago Mathias (JLE)	26	7.7
5	(Brazil) Douglas Kurtz (CEA)	29	7.1

Assists

Pos.	Name	G	APG
1	(Brazil) Gegê Chaia (MIN)	27	7.4
2	(Argentina) Fabián Sahdi (SJO)	27	7.3
3	(Brazil) Nezinho dos Santos (UBR)	29	7.2
4	(Uruguay) Luciano Parodi (COR)	21	6.5
5	(Brazil) Vithinho Lersch (VAS)	19	6.4

Blocks

Pos.	Name	G	BPG
1	(Brazil) Ronald dos Reis (UBR)	8	1.3
2	(Brazil) Leonardo Waszkiewicz (MIN)	29	1.2
3	(Brazil) Luis Felipe Gruberz (MOG)	32	1.1
4	(Brazil) Thiago Mathias (JLE)	26	1.0
5	(Venezuela) Windi Graterol (UBR)	29	1.0

Steals

Pos.	Name	G	SPG
1	(Brazil) Jefferson Socas (JLE)	26	2.3
2	(United States) Deonta Stocks (VAS)	8	2.1
3	(Uruguay) Luciano Parodi (COR)	21	2.1
4	(Brazil) Cauê Borges (BOT)	31	1.8
5	(Argentina) Franco Balbi (FLA)	38	1.8

Efficiency

Pos.	Name	G	Eff
1	(Brazil) J. P. Batista (MOG)	32	20.5
2	(United States) David Jackson (FRA)	35	18.4
3	(United States) Shamell Stallworth (MOG)	32	17.5
4	(Venezuela) Windi Graterol (UBR)	27	16.7
5	(Uruguay) Luciano Parodi (COR)	21	16.6

Source: LNB – NBB
