= Kyle Fuller (basketball) =

American basketball player (born 1992)

No. 2 – Club Atlético Aguada
- Position: Point guard
- League: Liga Uruguaya de Básquetbol

Personal information
- Born: January 27, 1992 (age 34) Compton, California
- Listed height: 6 ft 2 in (1.88 m)
- Listed weight: 190 lb (86 kg)

Career information
- High school: Rancho Verde (Moreno Valley, California)
- College: Vanderbilt (2010–2014)
- NBA draft: 2014: undrafted
- Playing career: 2014–present

Career history
- 2014–2016: Toros de Aragua
- 2016–2017: Regatas Lima
- 2017–2018: Paulistano
- 2018–2020: Corinthians
- 2020–2022: Regatas Lima
- 2022–present: Club Atlético Aguada

Career highlights
- NBB champion (2018); São Paulo State champion (2017)

Kyle Alejandro Fuller Jr. (born January 27, 1992) is an American basketball point guard for Club Atlético Aguada of the Liga Uruguaya de Básquetbol (LUB). He attended and played college basketball for Vanderbilt University for four seasons between 2010 and 2014. Fuller has also played internationally for Paulistano, where he won the Novo Basquete Brasil title in the 2017–18 season, and Corinthians, also in the NBB.

He was a contestant on Season 6 of the US version of The Circle, placing second and later appearing on Battle Camp, finishing in 10th place.

== High school career ==
Fuller excelled athletically and academically at Rancho Verde High School in Moreno Valley, California. As a senior, Fuller was All-State and Conference MVP as he averaged 27.6 points, 8 assists, 6 rebounds and 4 steals while maintaining a 3.4 GPA. He is the winningest basketball player in Rancho Verde history. Fuller was rated as the number 34 point guard and given a scout grade of 91 in the class of 2010 by espn.com, who described him as "one of the more prolific scorers out west." He committed to play college basketball for Vanderbilt, turning down scholarship offers from California, Marquette and UCLA.

== College career ==
After quiet freshman and sophomore years, Fuller became the starter for Vanderbilt at point guard his junior season. Fuller attributed the change in his status on the team due to an improved work ethic resulting from a desire to honor his father's memory after his death that May. Fuller told USA Today that he was thinking about transferring, unhappy due to his lack of playing time when his sick father changed his mind "My dad told me I'm not a quitter", Fuller said. "He told me I'm going to fight for everything I've got. He said he didn't want to see me leave a good university, especially when you have a skill set to play at a high DI university. You're going to stay and there you're going to play." Starting at point guard junior year, Fuller averaged 8.7 points, 2.3 rebounds and 1.9 assists per game. Fuller earned Southeastern Conference Player of the Week for his performance against Xavier during which he scored 25 points including all 12 of Vanderbilt's points in overtime, leading them to a 66–64 Victory. Fuller returned to his starting role at the point guard position for his senior season in 2013–2014. He averaged 11.0 points, 2.2 rebounds, and 4.2 assists per game, qualifying him for second in the Southeastern Conference in assists per game. He recorded double-doubles against Kentucky and Tennessee with 17 points and 10 assists against Kentucky and 12 points and 10 assists against Tennessee. On January 16 Fuller scored 22 points against Missouri, including 8 in the final 65 seconds to help seal a 78–75 victory for the Commodores.

=== Career highlights ===
Points: 25, at Xavier (12/6/12)
Rebounds: 9, vs. Ole Miss (1/22/14)
Assists: 10, 2x, last vs. Tennessee (2/5/14)
Blocks: 1, 4x, last vs. Missouri (1/16/14)
Steals: 3, 2x, last vs. MTSU (12/21/12)
