= Anderson Varejão =

Brazilian basketball player (born 1982)

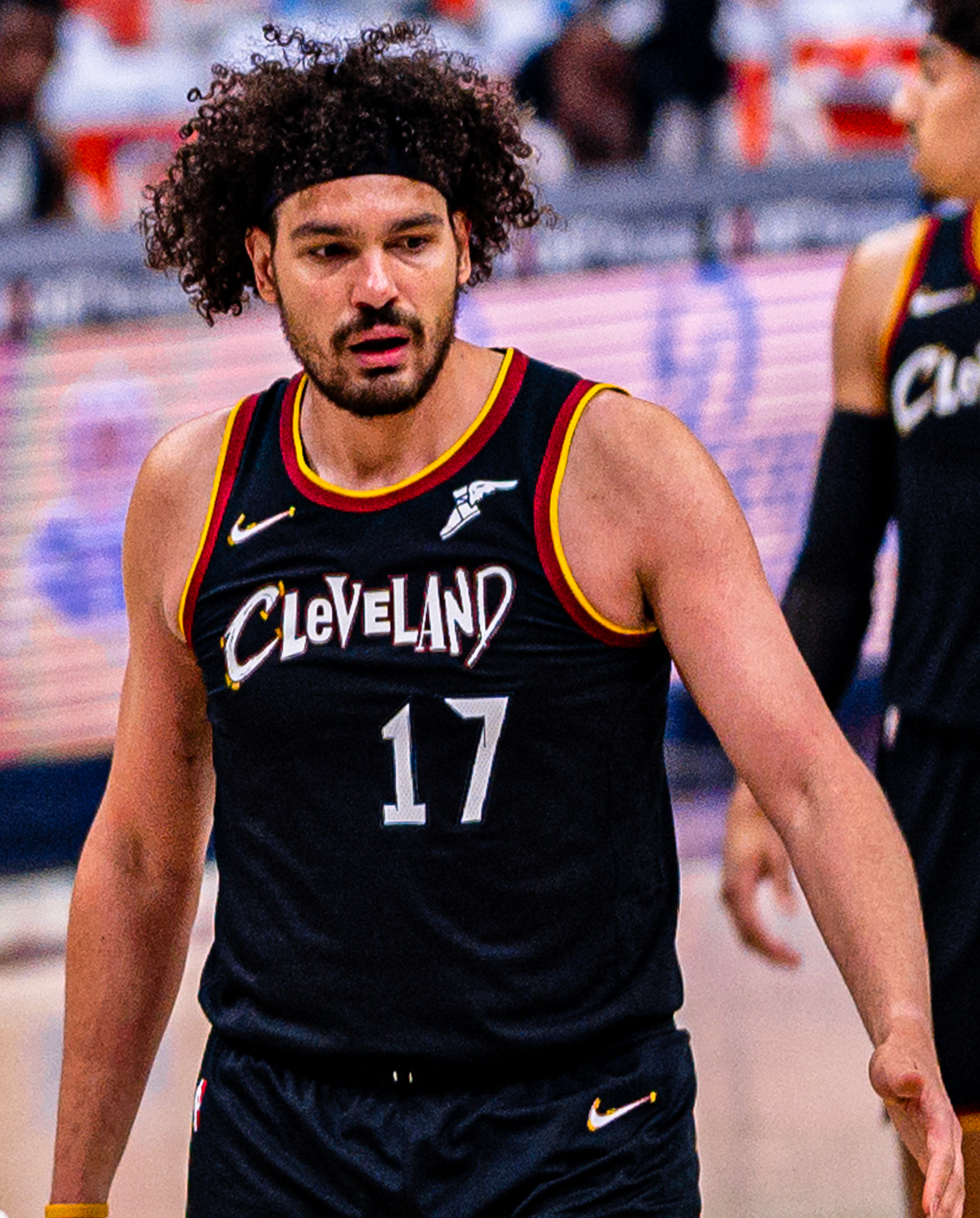
- Varejão with the Cleveland Cavaliers in 2021

Cleveland Cavaliers
- Title: Player development consultant and global ambassador
- League: NBA

Personal information
- Born: September 28, 1982 (age 44) Colatina, Brazil
- Listed height: 6 ft 11 in (2.11 m)
- Listed weight: 260 lb (118 kg)

Career information
- NBA draft: 2004: 2nd round, 30th overall pick
- Drafted by: Orlando Magic
- Playing career: 1998–2021
- Position: Center / power forward
- Number: 17, 18

Career history
- 1998–2003: Franca
- 2002–2004: Barcelona
- 2004–2016: Cleveland Cavaliers
- 2016–2017: Golden State Warriors
- 2018–2019: Flamengo
- 2021: Cleveland Cavaliers

Career highlights
- NBA All-Defensive Second Team (2010); NBB champion (2019); EuroLeague champion (2003); 2× Liga ACB champion (2003, 2004); Copa del Rey de Baloncesto champion (2003); Supercopa de España de Baloncesto champion (2004); 2× Campeonato Brasileiro de Basquete winner (1998, 1999)
- Stats at NBA.com
- Stats at Basketball Reference
Medals
Men's basketball
Representing Brazil
FIBA AmeriCup
Gold medal – first place	2005 Santo Domingo	National team
Gold medal – first place	2009 San Juan	National team
Silver medal – second place	2001 Neuquén	National team
FIBA South American Championship
Gold medal – first place	2003 Montevideo	National team
Pan American Games
Gold medal – first place	2003 Santo Domingo	National team

Anderson França Varejão (/ˌvɑːrəˈʒaʊn/ VAH-rə-ZHOWN; Portuguese pronunciation: [ˈɐ̃deʁsõ ˈfɾɐ̃sɐ vɐɾeˈʒɐ̃w]; born September 28, 1982) is a Brazilian former professional basketball player who is currently a player development consultant and global ambassador for the Cleveland Cavaliers, where he spent 13 of his 14 seasons in the National Basketball Association (NBA). With a career that spanned four professional leagues, Varejão also played for Franca and the Flamengo of the Novo Basquete Brasil (NBB), Barcelona of the EuroLeague and Liga ACB, and has been a regular member of the Brazilian national team, winning a gold medal in 2003 at the Pan American Games.

== Professional career ==
=== Franca (1998–2002) ===
From 1998 to 2002, Varejão played for Franca Basquetebol Clube in the city of Franca, São Paulo. After averaging 17.7 points, 9.7 rebounds, and 3.0 blocks per game in the first half of the 2001–02 season with them, he signed with FC Barcelona Bàsquet of the Liga ACB in January 2002.

=== Barcelona (2002–2004) ===
In nine EuroLeague games, Varejão averaged 4.7 points, 4.0 rebounds, 2.0 assists, and 1.1 blocks per game. In two regular season Liga ACB games, he averaged 4.0 points, 5.5 rebounds, 1.0 assist, and 1.0 steal per game.

In 2002–03, Varejão appeared in four regular season Liga ACB games for Barcelona, averaging 8.2 points and 6.0 rebounds per game. While he did not play in the 2003 Liga ACB playoffs, Barcelona, led by Juan Carlos Navarro, Šarūnas Jasikevičius and Dejan Bodiroga, won the Liga ACB championship. Varejão also played in 22 EuroLeague games (starting in one), helping Barcelona to their first ever EuroLeague championship. He averaged 4.1 points and 3.2 rebounds per game. Varejão later scored a point in the EuroLeague championship game against Benetton Treviso.

In 2003–04, Varejão appeared in 27 regular season Liga ACB games for Barcelona, averaging 7.5 points and 4.4 rebounds per game. He once again did not play in the playoffs, but Barcelona won its second straight Liga ACB championship, led by Navarro and Bodiroga. Varejão also played in 18 EuroLeague games, averaging 7.7 points and 5.0 rebounds per game.

=== Cleveland Cavaliers (2004–2016) ===
==== 2004–06: Early years ====
Varejão was selected by the Orlando Magic in the second round (30th overall) of the 2004 NBA draft. On July 23, 2004, Varejão, along with Drew Gooden and Steven Hunter, were traded to the Cleveland Cavaliers in exchange for Tony Battie and two future second-round picks.

As a rookie, Varejão came off the bench in 54 games and averaged 4.9 points, 4.8 rebounds, 0.5 assists, and 0.8 steals in 16 minutes played per game. He had a season-high 14 rebounds in a 84–71 victory over the Utah Jazz on January 15, 2005, and a season-high 14 points on March 26 in a 117–86 loss to the Dallas Mavericks. Varejão ranked first in the NBA in steals per turnover (1.58), fourth in the NBA in offensive rebounds per 48 minutes (6.1), second among rookies in offensive rebounds per 48 minutes (6.1), and fourth in total rebounds per 48 minutes (14.3).

After missing the first 32 games of the 2005–06 season with a dislocated right shoulder, Varejão played in 48 games, starting four and averaging 4.8 points, 4.6 rebounds, 0.4 assists, and 0.6 steals in 15.9 minutes per game. Varejão had a season-high 14 points on two occasions and a career-high 18 rebounds in a narrow 100–99 victory over the Atlanta Hawks on April 19, 2006.

On February 21, 2006, fans at Quicken Loans Arena attempted to break the Guinness World Record for "most people wearing wigs in a single venue" when 20,562 fans wore wigs given away before the game in celebration of Varejão's unique hairstyle. All of the fans in attendance were instructed to put the wigs on during a timeout. However, it does not appear that the fans were successful, as the Philadelphia Flyers now claim to have the wig wearing record with 9,315.

As a major contributor during the Cavaliers' 2006 playoff run, Varejão averaged 6.8 points and 4.5 rebounds (equating to 13.3 points and 8.8 rebounds per 36 minutes played) to go along with 0.2 assists and 0.7 steals in 18.3 minutes per game. During the Eastern Conference Semifinals against the Detroit Pistons, the career 63% foul shooter uncharacteristically shot over 80% from the free throw line and played a big part in the Cavaliers' victories in Game 3 (16 points) and Game 4 (drawing a charge from Chauncey Billups with 29 seconds left to play and by preventing Richard Hamilton from making a potentially game-winning shot).

==== 2006–08: Playoff upsets ====
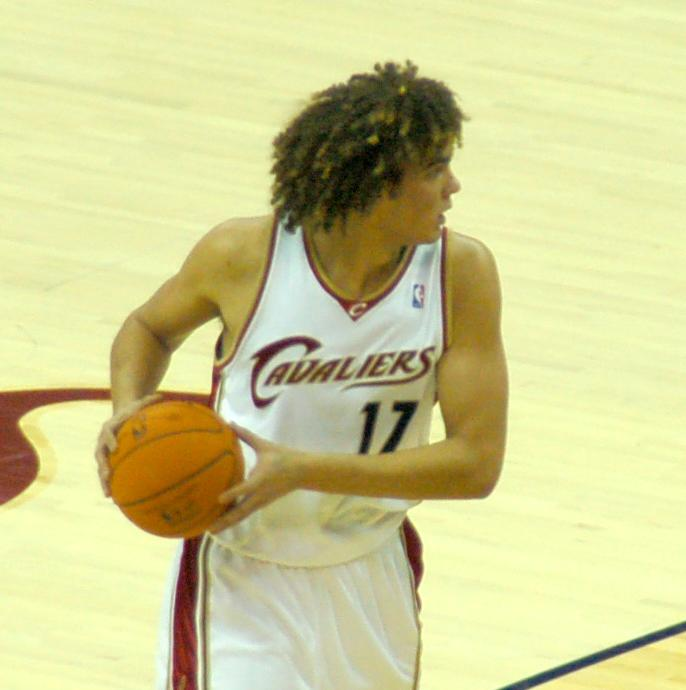
Varejão in 2006

In the 2006–07 season, Varejão received increased minutes from head coach Mike Brown. In 81 games played (six starts), Varejão averaged 6.8 points, 6.7 rebounds, 0.9 assists, and 0.9 steals per game. He was a staple on defense as he took 99 charges in the season, which was the most in the NBA. Varejão was also tied with Al Harrington for eighth in the NBA in personal fouls (269) and was eighth in the NBA's Defensive Rating.

On December 11, 2006, Varejão had a then career-high 17 points in a 95–89 loss to the New Orleans Hornets and a season-high 17 rebounds (including a career high nine offensive rebounds) in a narrow 99–98 loss to the Utah Jazz on February 14, 2007. Varejão played in all 20 of the Cavaliers' playoff games, averaging 6.0 points, 6.0 rebounds, 0.6 assists, and 1.0 steals in 22.4 minutes per game. He had a playoff high 14 points and a career playoff high 14 rebounds in a Game 2 79–76 loss to the Detroit Pistons during the Eastern Conference Finals. Varejão helped the Cavaliers reach the 2007 NBA Finals, where they lost to the San Antonio Spurs in a four-game sweep.

In the 2007 offseason, Varejão became a restricted free agent, and he did not sign a contract with the Cavaliers at the start of the 2007–08 NBA season. On December 4, 2007, Varejão signed a two-year, $11.1 million offer sheet (with a player option for a third year at $6.2 million) with the Charlotte Bobcats. Under the NBA's collective bargaining rules, the Cavaliers had a week to match the offer sheet, which they did on December 5.

In 48 regular season games (13 starts), Varejão averaged career highs in minutes (27.5), rebounds (8.3), offensive rebounds (2.8), and assists (1.1). On January 11, 2008, he had a season-high and career-high tying 18 rebounds on January 11 in a 113–106 victory over the Charlotte Bobcats, a career high six assists on March 8 in a 103–95 victory over the Indiana Pacers, and a season-high 17 points (tying his career-high) in a 118–114 victory over the Bobcats on April 2. In his 13 starts, Varejão averaged 7.9 points and 10.1 rebounds.

In 13 playoff games, Varejão averaged 4.1 points, 5.2 rebounds, 0.6 steals, and a then career playoff high 0.7 assists in 18.5 minutes. During Game 2 of the Eastern Conference against the Boston Celtics, he had 10 rebounds in the 89–73 loss. Four days later in Game 4, Varejão scored 12 points in the 88–77 victory.

==== 2008–13: All-Defensive honors and injury-plagued seasons ====
On November 7, 2008, Varejão scored a then career-high 18 points in a 111–107 victory over the Indiana Pacers. On January 2, 2009, he eclipsed his personal best by scoring a career-high 26 points in a 117–92 victory over the Chicago Bulls. Varejão finished the 2008–09 season playing in 28.5 minutes per game and averaged 8.6 points, 7.2 rebounds, 1.0 assists, and 0.9 steals in 81 games and 42 starts.

On July 9, 2009, Varejão reached an agreement with the Cavaliers to sign a six-year contract worth $42.5 million. On December 30, he recorded 14 points, nine rebounds, and three blocks while also making the game-winning three-pointer in a 106–101 victory over the Atlanta Hawks – his only successful three-pointer in 43 career attempts. Despite only starting in seven games during the 2009–10 season, Varejão still averaged 8.6 points, 7.6 rebounds, 1.1 assists, and 0.9 steals playing 28.5 minutes per game in 76 games. The Cavaliers once again made the playoffs, where they eventually lost to the Boston Celtics in the Eastern Conference Semifinals. Varejão was named to the NBA All-Defensive Second Team at the end of the season.

Varejão became the Cavaliers' starting center in the 2010–11 season. In 31 games and starts, he played in 32.1 minutes per game, averaging 9.1 points, 9.7 rebounds, 1.5 assists, and 0.9 steals per game, but was forced to miss the rest of the season due to a torn tendon in his foot, which Varejão suffered during a 120–105 loss to the Toronto Raptors on January 5, 2011.

In the 2011–12 season, Varejão was the starting center again. On January 31 against the Celtics, he set his then career high with 20 rebounds on while also adding 20 points in the 93–90 loss. However, Varejão suffered a broken wrist in a narrow 113–112 loss to the Milwaukee Bucks 10 days later, causing him to miss the rest of the season. In 25 games and starts, Varejão averaged 10.8 points, 11.5 rebounds, 1.7 assists, and 1.4 steals in 31.4 minutes per game.

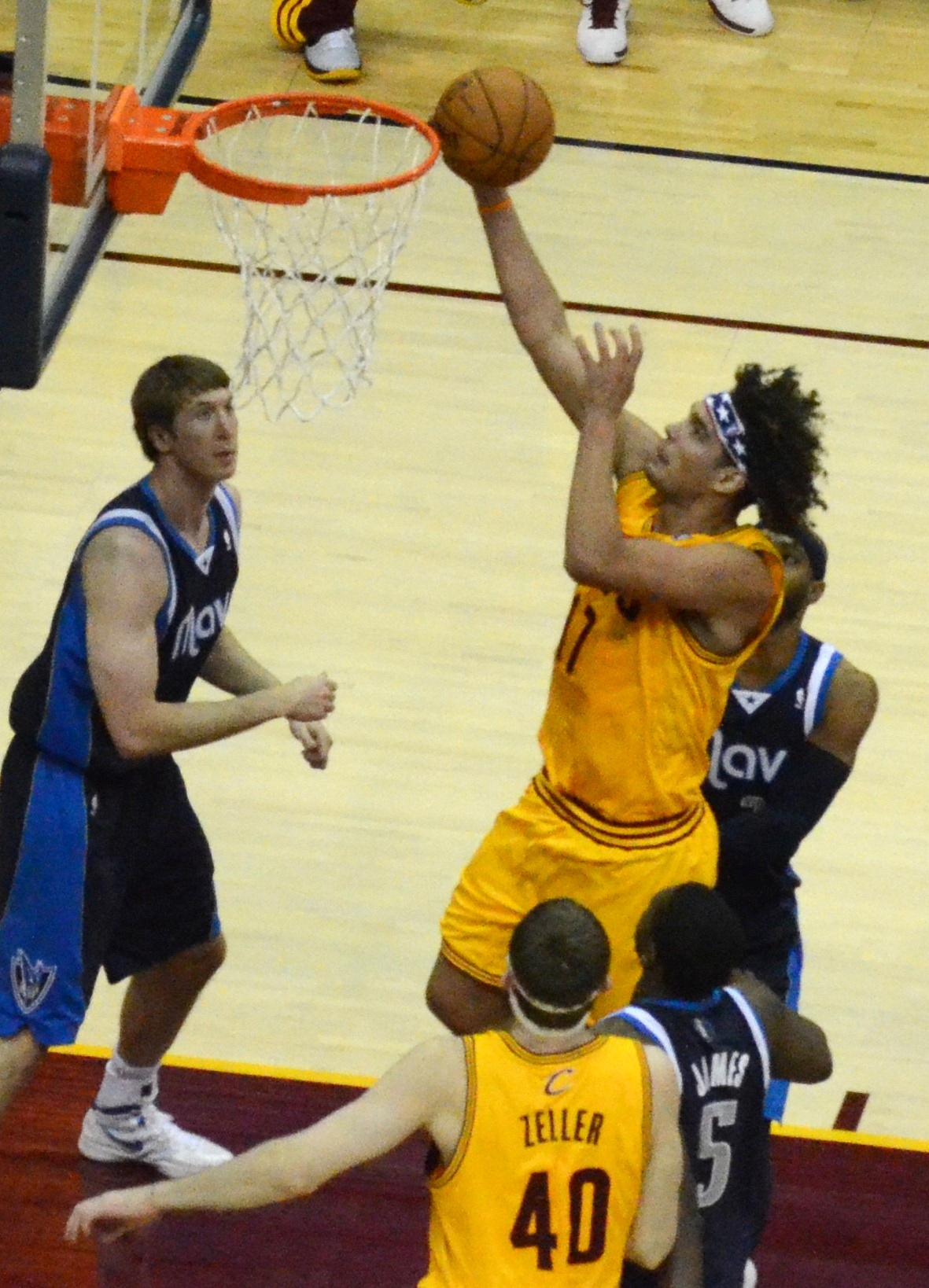
Varejão in 2012

During the 2012–13 season opener, a 94–84 victory over the Washington Wizards on October 30, 2012, Varejão returned from injury and nearly acquired a triple-double, recording nine points, a career high nine assists, and a then career high 23 rebounds. Two weeks later against the Brooklyn Nets on November 13, he scored a career-high 35 points while also recording 18 rebounds, three assists, and two steals in the 114–101 loss. However, on January 21, 2013, it was announced that Varejão would miss the rest of the season after being hospitalized due to a blood clot in his lung. Over 25 games and starts in the 2012–13 season, Varejão had career-highs, averaging 14.1 points, 14.4 rebounds, 3.4 assists, and 1.5 steals in 31.4 minutes.

==== 2013–16: Final years in Cleveland ====
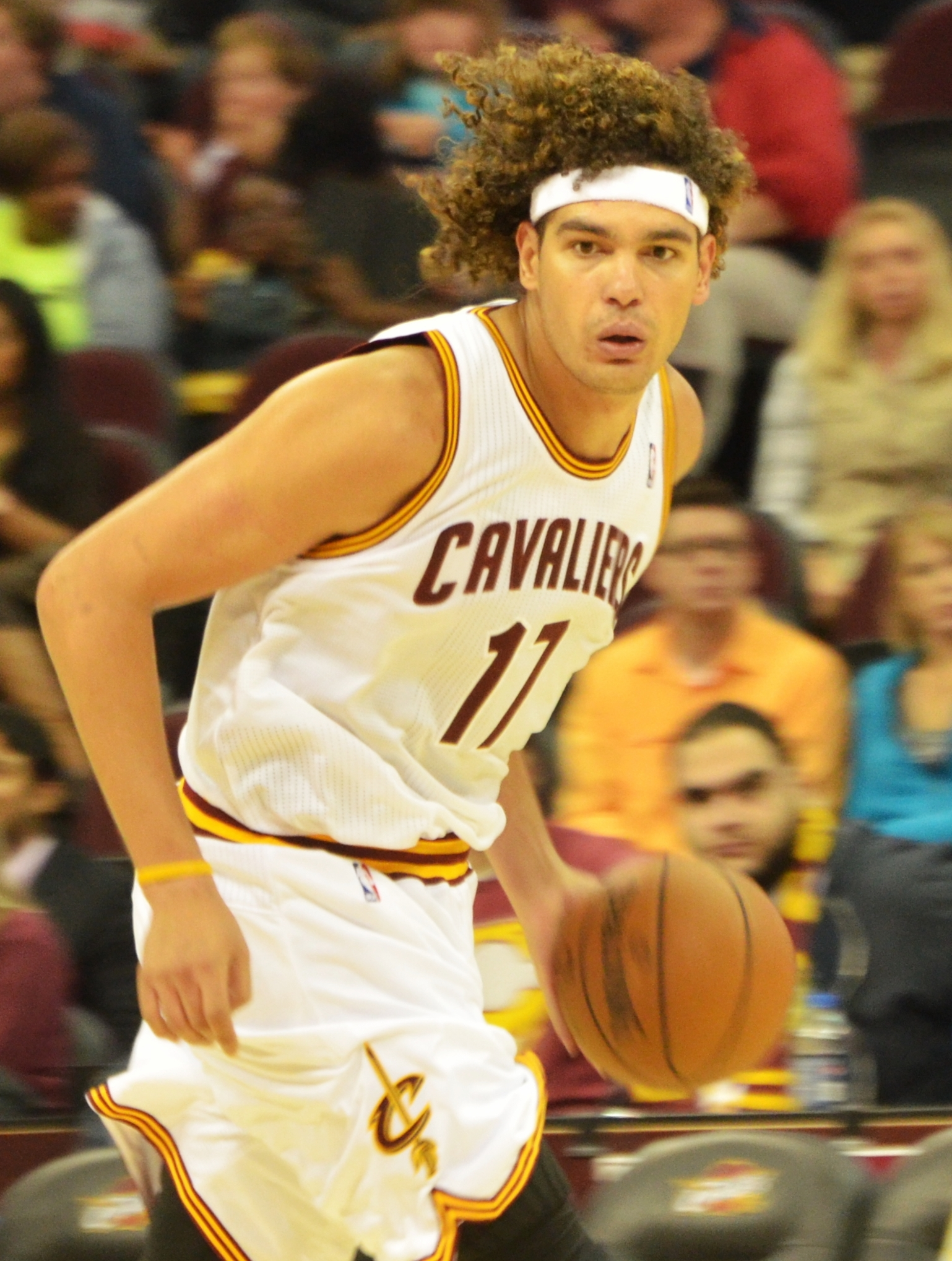
Varejão in 2013

In the 2013–14 season, Varejão started in only 29 games for the Cavaliers as the team had Andrew Bynum in the first half of the season and Spencer Hawes in the second half. After starting early on in the season, Varejão lost his spot in mid-November to Bynum before reclaiming it in late December after Bynum was suspended indefinitely by the team. On January 2 against the Orlando Magic, Varejão had 18 points and a career-high 25 rebounds in the 87–81 overtime victory. In January, Bynum was traded to the Indiana Pacers and the Cavaliers acquired Hawes from the Philadelphia 76ers in February. Around this time, Varejão was sidelined for a month with back soreness. He returned in March and came off the bench for the rest of the season. Varejão played in 65 games and finished the season averaging 8.4 points, 9.7 rebounds, 2.2 assists, and 1.1 steals in 27.7 minutes per game.

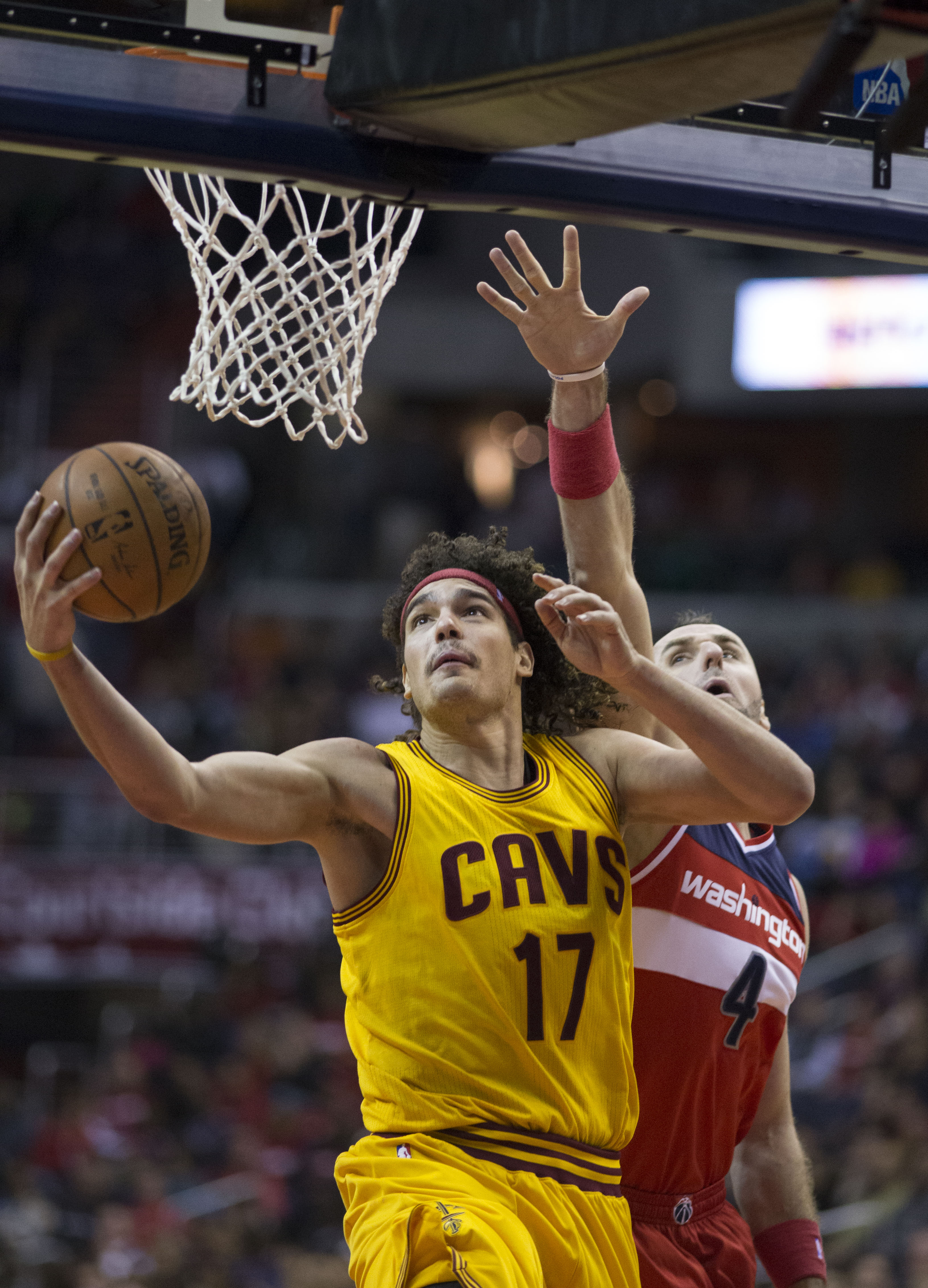
Varejão in 2014

On October 31, 2014, Varejão signed a three-year, $30 million contract extension with the Cavaliers. He had been having a good offensive season as LeBron James' favorite pick-and-roll partner, shooting 55 percent from the field and averaging 10.0 points and 6.6 rebounds. However, during a 125–104 victory over the Minnesota Timberwolves on December 23, Varejão tore his Achilles and was subsequently ruled out for the rest of the 2014–15 season. Varejão finished the season playing in 24.5 minutes per game and averaged 9.8 points, 6.5 rebounds, 1.3 assists, and 0.7 steals in 26 games and starts. The Cavaliers reached the 2015 NBA Finals, where they lost to the Golden State Warriors in six games despite a 2–1 lead.

Varejão returned from injury in time for the narrow season-opening 97–95 loss to the Chicago Bulls on October 27, 2015. After averaging 2.6 points, 2.9 rebounds, 0.6 assists, and 0.4 steals in 10 minutes per game over 31 games and no starts, Varejão and a future first-round draft pick were traded to the Portland Trail Blazers in exchange for a future second-round pick on February 18, 2016. However, Varejão was waived by the Blazers immediately upon being acquired.

=== Golden State Warriors (2016–2017) ===
On February 22, 2016, Varejão signed with the Golden State Warriors. He made his Warriors debut two days later and played averaged 2.6 points, 2.3 rebounds, 0.7 assists, and 0.2 steals in 8.5 minutes per game over 22 games and no starts to finish the regular season. The 2015–16 Warriors won an NBA-record 73 games to eclipse the 72 wins set by the 1995–96 Chicago Bulls. They also reached the 2016 NBA Finals after overcoming a 3–1 deficit in the Western Conference Finals after defeating the Oklahoma City Thunder in seven games. During the NBA Finals, the Warriors faced Varejão's former team, the Cleveland Cavaliers. According to the Elias Sports Bureau, Varejão became the first player in NBA history to play for both NBA Finals teams in the same season. The Warriors lost to the Cavaliers in seven games despite a 3–1 lead. Varejão was offered a championship ring, but he declined as he played for the opposition.

In July 2016, Varejão re-signed with the Warriors on a one-year deal. On February 3, 2017, he was waived after playing in 6.6 minutes per game and averaging 1.3 points, 1.9 rebounds, 0.7 assists, and 0.2 steals in 14 games and one start. The Warriors went on to win the NBA Finals in 2017, and Varejão was offered a championship ring as a result, which he accepted.

=== Flamengo (2018–2019) ===
On January 17, 2018, Varejão signed a 20-month contract with Flamengo. He played the second half of the 2017–18 season and then continued on with Flamengo for the 2018–19 season.

=== Return to Cleveland (2021) ===
On May 4, 2021, Varejão signed a 10-day contract to return to the Cleveland Cavaliers. The team was granted a hardship exception to acquire him. Ten days later, Varejão signed another 10-day contract. He finished the season playing in 7.2 minutes per game and averaged 2.6 points, 4.0 rebounds, and 0.6 assists in five games and no starts.

=== Retirement ===
Following the 2020–21 season, Varejão announced his retirement from professional basketball.

On August 14, 2024, it was announced that Varejão would be inducted into the Greater Cleveland Sports Hall of Fame on October 15.

== Executive career ==
On January 13, 2023, the Cavaliers hired Varejão to hold the role of Player Development Consultant and Global Ambassador.

== National team career ==
Varejão has been a regular member of the senior Brazilian national team since 2001, winning a gold medal in 2003 at the Pan American Games and competing in every world cup between 2002 and 2019. On August 23, 2006, he committed a controversial foul during a preliminary game of the 2006 FIBA World Championship against Greece, elbowing Greek point guard Nikos Zisis in the face.

== Player profile ==
Varejão earned the nickname "Wild Thing" because of his wild hair and energetic and relentless style of play. Varejão has been criticized for flopping when trying to draw a charge. Ian Thomsen, a Sports Illustrated columnist, grouped Varejão with fellow foreign players Vlade Divac and Manu Ginóbili as the players who "made [flopping] famous", exaggerating contact on the court the way players dive in association football games. Longtime Cavaliers teammate LeBron James defended Varejão, stating: "He's taking physical charges."

== Personal life ==
Varejão's older brother, Sandro, was also a professional basketball player. His niece, Izabel, played college basketball for the University of Michigan.

Varejão has been married twice. His first marriage was to Marcelle Silva from 2013 to 2016. Varejão has been married to his current wife, Stacy Bradley, since 2019. They have two children together: Serenee and Sebastio.

== NBA career statistics ==
Legend
GP	Games played	GS	Games started	MPG	Minutes per game
FG%	Field goal percentage	3P%	3-point field goal percentage	FT%	Free throw percentage
RPG	Rebounds per game	APG	Assists per game	SPG	Steals per game
BPG	Blocks per game	PPG	Points per game	**Bold**	Career high

=== Regular season ===
Year	Team	GP	GS	MPG	FG%	3P%	FT%	RPG	APG	SPG	BPG	PPG
2004–05	Cleveland	54	0	16.0	.513	.000	.535	4.8	.5	.8	.7	4.9
2005–06	Cleveland	48	4	15.8	.527	.000	.513	4.9	.4	.6	.4	4.6
2006–07	Cleveland	**81**	6	23.9	.476	.000	.616	6.7	.9	.9	.6	6.8
2007–08	Cleveland	48	13	27.5	.461	.000	.598	8.3	1.1	.8	.5	6.7
2008–09	Cleveland	**81**	**42**	28.5	.536	.000	.616	7.2	1.0	.9	.8	8.6
2009–10	Cleveland	76	7	28.5	**.572**	**.200**	.663	7.6	1.1	.9	.9	8.6
2010–11	Cleveland	31	31	32.1	.528	.000	.667	9.7	1.5	.9	**1.2**	9.1
2011–12	Cleveland	25	25	31.4	.514	.000	.672	11.5	1.7	1.4	.7	10.8
2012–13	Cleveland	25	25	**36.0**	.478	.000	.755	**14.4**	**3.4**	**1.5**	.6	**14.1**
2013–14	Cleveland	65	29	27.7	.495	.000	.681	9.7	2.2	1.1	.6	8.4
2014–15	Cleveland	26	26	24.5	.555	.000	.733	6.5	1.3	1.1	.6	9.8
2015–16	Cleveland	31	0	10.0	.421	.000	**.762**	2.9	.6	.4	.2	2.6
2015–16	Golden State	22	0	8.5	.438	—	.552	2.3	.7	.2	.2	2.6
2016–17	Golden State	14	1	6.6	.357	—	.727	1.9	.7	.2	.2	1.3
2020–21	Cleveland	5	0	7.2	.250	.000	.556	4.0	.6	0	.4	2.6
Career		632	209	23.9	.509	.023	.630	7.2	1.2	.8	.6	7.2

=== Playoffs ===
Year	Team	GP	GS	MPG	FG%	3P%	FT%	RPG	APG	SPG	BPG	PPG
2006	Cleveland	13	0	18.3	**.620**	—	.703	4.5	.2	.7	.2	6.8
2007	Cleveland	**20**	0	22.4	.511	.000	.563	6.0	.6	1.0	.6	6.0
2008	Cleveland	13	0	18.5	.407	—	.429	5.2	.7	.6	.1	4.1
2009	Cleveland	14	**14**	**30.0**	.500	—	.682	6.4	.6	**1.3**	**1.1**	**6.9**
2010	Cleveland	11	0	23.2	.417	.000	**.742**	**6.5**	.6	1.0	.8	5.7
2016	Golden State	17	0	5.5	.357	—	.526	1.2	**.8**	.1	.1	1.2
Career		88	14	19.2	.488	.000	.618	4.8	.6	.5	.8	5.0
