= Esporte Clube Vitória (basketball) =

- Leagues: Novo Basquete Brasil
- Founded: 1899
- Location: Salvador, Bahia (Brazil)
Home	Away

Esporte Clube Vitória (basketball) is a Brazilian professional basketball team located in the city of Salvador, Bahia (Brazil). The team competes in the Novo Basquete Brasil.

== Notable players ==
Note: Flags indicate national team eligibility at FIBA-sanctioned events. Players may hold other non-FIBA nationalities not displayed.

Criteria

To appear in this section a player must have either:

- Set a club record or won an individual award while at the club
- Played at least one official international match for their national team at any time
- Played at least one official NBA match at any time.

- (Brazil) Arthur
- (Ghana) Kojo Mensah
- (Spain) Alvaro Calvo

== See also ==
- Esporte Clube Vitória
