= Liga Ouro de Basquete =

Liga Ouro de Basquete Gold Basketball League
- Founded: 2013
- First season: 2014
- Country: Brazil
- Number of teams: 9
- Level on pyramid: 2nd
- Promotion to: Novo Basquete Brasil (NBB)
- Current champions: Osasco 2 (2025)
- Website: LNB.com.br

The Liga Ouro de Basquete (LOB) (English: Gold Basketball League) is the second-tier level men's professional club basketball league in Brazil. It is organized by the Liga Nacional de Basquete (LNB) (National Basketball League), with the approval of the Confederação Brasileira de Basketball (CBB) (Brazilian Basketball Confederation).

== History ==
The Liga Ouro de Basquete (Gold Basketball League) was founded by the Liga Nacional de Basquete (LNB) (National Basketball League), with the approval of the Confederação Brasileira de Basketball (CBB) (Brazilian Basketball Confederation), in November 2013. The first season of the competition was held in 2014. The number of teams competing in the league gradually increased over time. In the league's first 3 seasons (2014, 2015, 2016), there were only 4 teams participating. The number of teams was increased to 6 for the 2017 season, and to 9 for the 2018 season.

In October 2018, it was announced that the 2019 season would be the last season of the Liga Ouro de Basquete, and that a new competition, organized by the Brazilian Basketball Confederation (CBB), would replace it.

== Format and competition system ==
The regular season of the Liga Ouro de Basquete is usually played in the first half of the year. During the first 3 editions of the league, when it had just 4 teams, the regular season ran under a system where all of the teams played each other four times each (two home games and two away games). The first placed team qualified for the league's Grand Finals automatically, and the second and third placed teams faced off to determine the other Grand Finals team.

In 2018, with the increase of the number of teams in the league to 6, the format was changed to a system where all of the teams played each other twice (once at home, and once on the road). The first two placed teams qualified directly to the league's semifinals, while the third to sixth placed teams competed for the other two semifinals places. The league's playoffs begin shortly after the end of the regular season, with quarterfinals games played between the third and sixth placed teams in the league's final regular season standings. The quarterfinals are played in a three-game series. The winners of the quarterfinals play the top two placed regular season teams in a best of five series format in the semifinals.

The Grand Finals is played in a best of five games format. The winner of the league's Grand Finals series is crowned the league's champion, and also earns a league promotion to Brazil's top-tier level league, the NBB, for the following season.

== Finals ==
Season	Champion	Result	Runner-up
2014	Rio Claro Basquete	3–1	Lins
2015	Caxias do Sul	3–1	SCR
2016	Vasco da Gama	3–2	Campo Mourão
2017	Botafogo	3–2	AAB Joinville
2018	S.C. Corinthians Paulista	3–1	São José
2019	Unifacisa Basquete	3–2	São Paulo
2025	Osasco 2	3–2	Cruzeiro

== Titles by club ==
Club	Titles won	Years won	Runners-up	Years Runners-up
Rio Claro	1	2014	–	–
Caxias do Sul	1	2015	–	–
C.R. Vasco da Gama	1	2016	–	–
Botafogo F.R.	1	2017	–	–
S.C. Corinthians Paulista	1	2018	–	–
Osasco 2	1	2025	–	–
Lins	–	–	1	2014
SCR	–	–	1	2015
Campo Mourão	–	–	1	2016
AAB Joinville	–	–	1	2017
São José	–	–	1	2018
Cruzeiro	–	–	1	2025
