= Botafogo de Futebol e Regatas (basketball) =

Botafogo Basquete
- Nickname: Fogão (The Great Fire); A Estrela Solitária (The Lone Star); O Glorioso (The Glorious One); O Mais Tradicional (The Most Traditional)
- Leagues: NBB
- Founded: 1894 (Rowing Club); 1904 (Football Club); 1933 (Basketball Club); 1942 (merger)
- History: Botafogo Basquete (1933–present)
- Arena: Ginásio Oscar Zelaya; Carioca Arena 1
- Capacity: 1,500 (fan seating); 6,000 (fan seating)
- Location: Botafogo, Rio de Janeiro, Brazil
- Team colors: Black, Silver and White
- President: Mufarrej
- Head coach: Léo Figueiró
- Championships: 1 Brazilian Championship; 1 Liga Ouro; 1 South American League
- Website: botafogo.com.br
Home	Away

Botafogo Basquete, or Botafogo Basquetebol (English: Botafogo Basket or Botafogo Basketball) is the men's professional basketball team of the major multi-sports club Botafogo de Futebol e Regatas (Botafogo Football and Rowing), which is abbreviated as Botafogo F.R. The club is based in Botafogo, Rio de Janeiro, Brazil. The club's full name is Basquete do Botafogo de Futebol e Regatas, which is abbreviated as Botafogo F.R. Basquete.

== History ==
The multi-sport Club de Regatas Botafogo (Botafogo Rowing Club), abbreviated as C.R. Botafogo, was founded in 1894. The club's basketball section was founded in 1933, and were finalists of the Rio de Janeiro State Championship, in 1934 and 1937. The multi-sport club Botafogo Football Club, abbreviated as Botafogo F.C., was founded in 1904. Its basketball section won the Rio de Janeiro State Championship in 1939 and 1942.

Basketball played a major role in the development of Botafogo F.R.'s multi-sports athletic club. In 1942, a basketball game was played between the two sports clubs of the Botafogo neighborhood, C.R. Botafogo and Botafogo F.C., respectively. During the game, just after halftime, Armando Albano, a player of Botafogo F.C., died on the court, after suffering a heart attack. In his honor, the presidents of each club decided to merge their clubs, and become Botafogo de Futebol e Regatas (Botafogo Football and Rowing), abbreviated as Botafogo F.R. The club also took a new flag and a new crest, mixing both club's originals. After that, Botafogo F.R.'s basketball club won several local Rio de Janeiro State Championships, including the three-peat of 1943, 1944, and 1945.

Botafogo F.R. also won the Brazilian Cup (Brazilian Championship) title in 1967, and became the first and only club from Rio to win the top-tier level Brazilian league. Another club from Rio did not do so until 2000. They also competed in the 1968 edition of the FIBA Intercontinental Cup. At the beginning of the 2000s decade, the club's basketball department became amateur, and only became professional again in 2015.

In the 2017 season, Botafogo F.R. played in the Brazilian Gold League, the second-tier level of Brazilian pro club basketball. The club finished the regular season in first place, and went on to win the league title. They beat Blumenau in the playoffs, and then won the league's finals, after beating AAB Joinville in the 5th and decisive game, at home, by a score of 90–68. The team's main star, Jamaal Smith, was named the league's Finals MVP, after a great performance during the series.

In the 2018–19 NBB season, with Léo Figueiró already as head coach, the team reached the semifinals, losing to Flamengo Basketball that would go to win the league's title. Coach Léo Figueiró was named NBB's Coach of the Year. With this campaign, Botafogo finished 4th and secured a place at the Liga Sudamericana de Básquetbol's next season.

At the beginning of the 2019–20 season, the team debuted at the Liga Sudamericana de Básquetbol, in a group hosted in San Andres, Colombia, that had the home team Warriors de San Andrés, Nacional de Montevideo and Salta Basket. After finishing 2–1, the team advanced to the semifinals stage. The next stage was played in La Banda, and Botafogo faced, once again, Salta and Nacional, and the home team Ciclista Olímpico. At the first game, Botafogo beat Salta 62–61 with a buzzer-beater shot from Arthur Bernardi. The next day the team beat Nacional by a 10 points margin and, at the final and decisive game, Jamaal Smith put on a show and helped Botafogo come from a 17 point deficit against Ciclista Olímpico to advance to the Finals to face Corinthians. After losing the first game of the finals in Rio, the team counted with amazing performances of Jamaal Smith and Cauê Borges in game 2 and 3 respectively to win back to back games in São Paulo to conquer its first international trophy. The next day, a huge crowd of fans showed up to receive the players and celebrate the title at the club's Ginásio Oscar Zelaya.

== Players ==
=== Current roster ===
Note: Flags indicate national team eligibility at FIBA-sanctioned events. Players may hold other non-FIBA nationalities not displayed.

Botafogo Basquete roster
Players
Coaches

Pos.	No.	Nat.	Name	Ht.	Wt.	Age
F/C		(Brazil)	Sommer, Dú	2.05 m (6 ft 9 in)	105 kg (231 lb)	30 – 29 December 1994
C		(Brazil)	Mariano, Lucas	2.08 m (6 ft 10 in)	128 kg (282 lb)	31 – 24 September 1993
C		(Brazil)	Sena, Wesley	2.11 m (6 ft 11 in)	118 kg (260 lb)	29 – 2 May 1996
G	0	(Brazil)	Coelho, Henrique	1.87 m (6 ft 2 in)	90 kg (198 lb)	32 – 17 February 1993
G	3	(Brazil)	Ceccato, Guga	1.90 m (6 ft 3 in)	90 kg (198 lb)	30 – 22 February 1995
G	4	(Brazil)	Borges, Cauê	1.87 m (6 ft 2 in)	90 kg (198 lb)	33 – 13 December 1991
PG	5	(United States)	Smith, Jamaal	1.85 m (6 ft 1 in)	85 kg (187 lb)	40 – 25 February 1985
SG	7	(Brazil)	da Silva, Jackson	1.92 m (6 ft 4 in)	93 kg (205 lb)	28 – 22 November 1996
C	10	(Brazil)	Ansaloni, Ralfi	2.10 m (6 ft 11 in)	113 kg (249 lb)	37 – 26 December 1987
SF	11	(Brazil)	Verrissimo, Fabrício	1.92 m (6 ft 4 in)	95 kg (209 lb)	27 – 30 March 1998
F/C	12	(Brazil)	Lima, Erike	2.03 m (6 ft 8 in)	100 kg (220 lb)	25 – 8 August 1999
PG	13	(Brazil)	Rodrigues, Pedro	1.75 m (5 ft 9 in)	74 kg (163 lb)	24 – 1 September 2000
F	14	(Brazil)	de Freitas, Yan	1.98 m (6 ft 6 in)	93 kg (205 lb)	24 – 8 July 2000
F	15	(Brazil)	Conceição, Diego	1.98 m (6 ft 6 in)	98 kg (216 lb)	38 – 8 May 1987
C	21	(Brazil)	Becker, Murilo	2.08 m (6 ft 10 in)	110 kg (243 lb)	41 – 14 July 1983
PF	36	(Brazil)	Bernardi, Arthur	2.04 m (6 ft 8 in)	102 kg (225 lb)	35 – 16 March 1990

Head coach

- (Brazil) Léo Figueiró

Assistant coach(es)

- (Brazil) Jece Clodoaldo de Moraes Leite

Team manager

Legend

- (C) Team captain
- Injured

- Roster
Updated: 9 July 2019

=== Depth chart ===
Pos.	Starting 5	Bench
C	Lucas Mariano	Dú Sommer
PF	Arthur Bernardi	Wesley Senna
SF	Cauê Borges	Diego Conceição
SG	Jamaal Smith	Freddie McSwain Jr
PG	Henrique Coelho	Paulinho Boracini

== Honours and titles ==
=== International ===
- South American League
  - Champions (1): 2019

=== National ===
- Brazilian Championship
  - Champions (1): 1967
- Brazilian second division
  - Champions (1): 2017

=== Regional ===
- Rio de Janeiro State Championship
  - Champions (10): 1939, 1942 (as Botafogo F.C.), 1943, 1944, 1945, 1947, 1966, 1967, 1968, 1991 (as Botafogo F.R.)
  - Runners-up (10): 1934, 1937 (as C.R. Botafogo), 1941 (as Botafogo F.C.), 1946, 1951, 1965, 1973, 1999, 2000, 2018, 2019 (as Botafogo F.R.)

== Individual awards ==
Brazilian 2nd Division Season MVP:

- Jamaal Smith - 2017

Brazilian 2nd Division Finals MVP:

- Jamaal Smith - 2017

NBB Coach of The Year:

- Léo Figueiró - 2019

South American League MVP:

- Cauê Borges - 2019

== Head coaches ==
- (Brazil) Togo "Kanela" Renan Soares

== Women's team ==
Botafogo's women's basketball team has won the most state championships, with seven titles. They won the state championship in 1955, 1960, 1961, 1962, 1963, 1995, and 2006.

== See also ==
- Botafogo de Futebol e Regatas
- Botafogo de Futebol e Regatas (women)
