= Gustavo de Conti =

Brazilian basketball player and coach

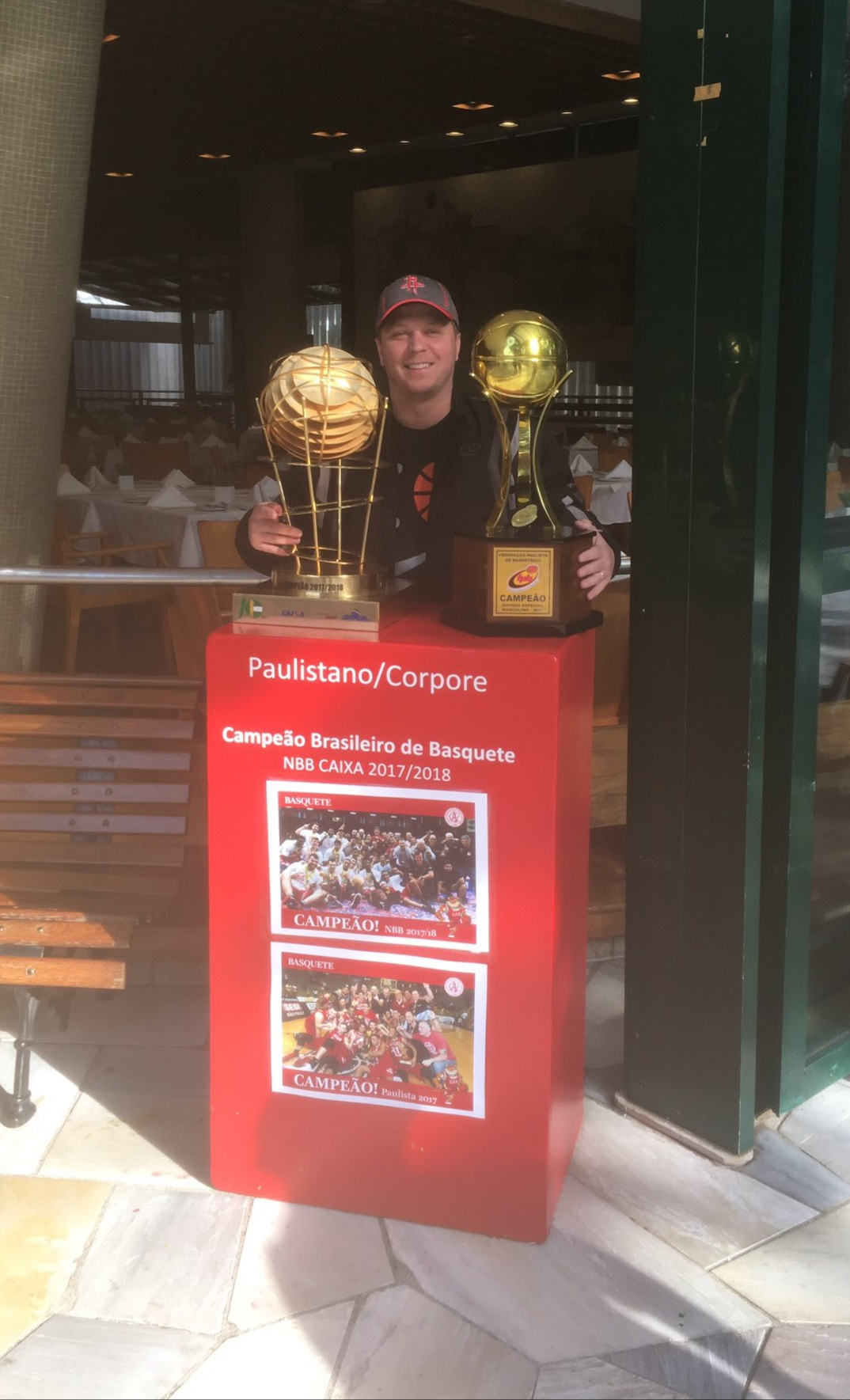
- De Conti in November 2018

Diablos Rojos del México
- Title: Head coach
- League: LNBP

Personal information
- Born: February 27, 1980 (age 46) Rio de Janeiro, Brazil
- Listed height: 5 ft 10.5 in (1.79 m)
- Position: Point guard
- Coaching career: 2004–present

Career history

Coaching
- 2004–2010: Paulistano (assistant)
- 2010–2018: Paulistano
- 2018–2026: Flamengo
- 2026–present: Diablos Rojos del México

Career highlights
- As a head coach: BCL Americas champion (2021); 3× NBB champion (2018, 2019, 2021); 2× Super 8 Cup winner (2018, 2021); 3× Rio de Janeiro State champion (2018, 2019, 2020); São Paulo State champion (2017); 4× NBB Coach of the Year (2014, 2017, 2018, 2021)
Medals
Men's basketball
Head coach for Brazil
FIBA AmeriCup
Silver medal – second place	2022 Brazil

Gustavo Antonio de Conti (born February 27, 1980), also known as Gustavinho, is a Brazilian former basketball player. He is currently the Head coach of the NBB team Flamengo and Brazil men's national team

== Coaching career ==
=== Clubs ===
In 2018, De Conti became the head coach of the NBB basketball club Flamengo.

=== National teams ===
De Conti has also worked as an assistant coach of the senior Brazilian national basketball team. He first became an assistant with Brazil in 2012.
