= Fortaleza Basquete Cearense =

- Leagues: NBB
- Founded: June 23, 2012; 13 years ago
- Arena: Northeast Olympic Training Center
- Capacity: 20,000
- Location: Fortaleza, Brazil
- Team colors: White and Red
- Main sponsor: Solar; Unimed
- President: (Brazil) Thális Braga
- Head coach: (Serbia) Jelena Todorović
- Website: Official Website
Home	Away

Fortaleza Basquete Cearense is a Brazilian professional basketball team that is based in Fortaleza, Ceará, Brazil. The club plays in the Brazilian top-tier level Novo Basquete Brasil (NBB). The team was founded in 2012, and since then has played in all editions of the NBB, reaching the playoffs three times.

== History ==
Basquete Cearense was created in 2012, with the support of the government of Ceará, Fortaleza, City Hall, and sponsored by Sky. It was created as a project franchise, conceived by head coach Alberto Bial, who had been one of those responsible for the creation of the Joinville team. The team became the first basketball team from the Northeast Region of Brazil to play in the top-tier level Novo Basquete Brasil (NBB).

== Roster ==
Note: Flags indicate national team eligibility at FIBA-sanctioned events. Players may hold other non-FIBA nationalities not displayed.

Basquete Cearense roster
Players
Coaches

Pos.	No.	Nat.	Name	Ht.	Wt.	Age
C	1	(Brazil)	Neto, Feliciano	2.08 m (6 ft 10 in)	115 kg (254 lb)	35 – 23 May 1990
PG	3	(United States)	Brite, Dontrell	1.75 m (5 ft 9 in)	75 kg (165 lb)	31 – 31 March 1994
G/F	4	(Brazil)	Gusmão, Victor	1.85 m (6 ft 1 in)	82 kg (181 lb)	32 – 3 September 1993
G	5	(Brazil)	Willians, Léo	1.85 m (6 ft 1 in)	80 kg (176 lb)	28 – 20 October 1997
SG	7	(Brazil)	Lourenço, Paulo	1.93 m (6 ft 4 in)	97 kg (214 lb)	31 – 13 October 1994
PG	8	(Brazil)	Albuquerque, Gabriel	1.93 m (6 ft 4 in)	90 kg (198 lb)	40 – 26 December 1984
PG	9	(Brazil)	Boracini, Paulinho	1.83 m (6 ft 0 in)	82 kg (181 lb)	44 – 7 March 1981
PF	10	(Brazil)	de Oliveira, Alex	1.94 m (6 ft 4 in)	102 kg (225 lb)	42 – 17 August 1983
PG	11	(Brazil)	Freitas, Bruninho	1.82 m (6 ft 0 in)	78 kg (172 lb)	27 – 28 January 1998
SF	14	(Brazil)	da Silva, Sualisson	2.03 m (6 ft 8 in)	94 kg (207 lb)	33 – 14 October 1992
SG	17	(United States)	McLemore, Rashaun	1.95 m (6 ft 5 in)	92 kg (203 lb)	39 – 13 May 1986
PG	21	(United States)	Cobb, Farad	1.83 m (6 ft 0 in)	83 kg (183 lb)	32 – 5 April 1993
C	23	(Brazil)	Fiorotto, Bruno	2.08 m (6 ft 10 in)	115 kg (254 lb)	41 – 23 August 1984
PG	24	(Brazil)	Lassance, Rafael	1.84 m (6 ft 0 in)	62 kg (137 lb)	26 – 8 February 1999
F/C	33	(Brazil)	Ribeiro, Felipe	2.03 m (6 ft 8 in)	100 kg (220 lb)	46 – 20 August 1979
C	34	(Brazil)	Kurtz, Douglas	2.13 m (7 ft 0 in)	120 kg (265 lb)	38 – 11 July 1987
PG	45	(Brazil)	Gabriel, João	1.84 m (6 ft 0 in)	83 kg (183 lb)	25 – 6 April 2000
PG	55	(Brazil)	Lobo, Pedro	1.90 m (6 ft 3 in)	83 kg (183 lb)	23 – 21 August 2002

Head coach

- (Serbia) Jelena Todorović

Assistant coach(es)

- (Brazil) Luis Claudio da Mota Correa

Legend

- (C) Team captain
- Injured

- Roster
Updated: 2 July 2019

== Noted players ==
Note: Flags indicate national team eligibility at FIBA-sanctioned events. Players may hold other non-FIBA nationalities not displayed.

Criteria

To appear in this section a player must have either:

- Set a club record or won an individual award while at the club
- Played at least one official international match for their national team at any time
- Played at least one official NBA match at any time.

- (Brazil) Duda Machado
- (Brazil) Davi Rossetto
- (Brazil) Marcus Toledo
