= Novo Basquete Brasil =

- Organising body: Liga Nacional de Basquete (LNB)
- Founded: 2008; 18 years ago
- Country: Brazil
- Number of teams: 18
- Level on pyramid: 1st
- Relegation to: Liga Ouro de Basquete
- Related competitions: São Paulo State Championship; Rio de Janeiro State Championship
- Current champions: Franca (5th title)
- Most championships: Flamengo (7 titles)
- CEO: Rodrigo Montoro
- TV partners: ESPN; Facebook; Twitter
- Website: LNB.com.br
- 2025–26 NBB season

Novo Basquete Brasil (NBB; English: New Basketball Brazil) is the Brazilian premier professional men's basketball league. It is organized by the Liga Nacional de Basquete (LNB; English: National Basketball League), in a new format of Brazil's previous top-tier level basketball competition, the Campeonato Brasileiro de Basquete (Brazilian Basketball Championship). The NBB is managed by the Brazilian basketball associations, which were founding members of the LNB.

== Format ==
The NBB is the annual basketball league that is promoted by the national Brazilian league (LNB) organizing body, and is endorsed by the Brazilian Basketball Confederation (CFB). The first phase of the season consists of fifteen teams playing against each other, on a home and away basis. Then the top eight teams go to the playoffs, where the top ranked team plays against the one in the eighth place, the second from the top plays the seventh, and so on. Each playoff series is a best-of-five, apart from the championship final, which is a single game. In all of those, the best placed team has the home court advantage. Finally, the best placed teams in the league qualify to the South American top-tier level FIBA Americas League and the South American second-tier level FIBA South American League.

=== LOB ===
The NBB has a promotion and relegation format with the Brazilian second-tier level league, the Liga Ouro de Basquete (LOB) (Gold Basketball League). The worst performing teams of each NBB season are relegated down to the second-tier level LOB, while the best performing teams of each LOB season are promoted up to the top-tier level NBB.

=== LDB ===
The NBB also features an Under-20 age development league, called the Liga de Desenvolvimento de Basquete (LDB) (Developmental Basketball League).

== History ==
=== 2009 season ===
The NBB inaugural season didn't have the participation of founding-members Iguaçu, Londrina, Ulbra/Rio Claro, and Uberlândia.

=== 2009–10 season ===
For the second NBB edition, the LNB confirmed the participation of 14 teams. Limeira and Bira-Lajeado could not keep their squads, thus did not join the season. On the other hand, Londrina joined the League, while an Araraquara/Palmeiras deal brought back to the national competition one of the most traditional Brazilian clubs.

=== 2010–11 season ===
The 15 teams from the previous season confirmed their participation. The third NBB edition also featured former national and South American champions Uberlândia, who managed to gather a strong squad sponsored by Brasília's former partner, Universo. After a one-year hiatus, Limeira returned to the League. Besides that, first-timers Rio Claro and Iguaçu joined as well.

=== 2012–13 season ===
For the first time, the NBB had eighteen participating teams, a record in the NBB's history. The three-time champion, Brasília, came once again as the title favorite. But their greatest rival Flamengo, assembled a team to break this hegemony, and thus win the NBB after four years. Uberlândia emerged as one of the favorites for the title, as well as São José. The rookies were the teams of Suzano, Mogi das Cruzes, Palmeiras, and Basquete Cearense. Of the four, the only team to qualify for the playoffs was Basquete Cearense. The last two were Tijuca and Suzano. Suzano, due to financial difficulties, dismounted their team to the championship final, while Tijuca played a small promotion tournament with Fluminense and Macaé, respectively champion and runner-up of Supercopa Brasil de Basquete. In the playoffs, a surprise: the champions of the past three editions were eliminated in the quarterfinals by São José. In the semifinals, Flamengo eliminated São José 3–2, and Uberlândia swept Bauru by 3–0. The final, played in one game in Rio de Janeiro, was won by the super-team of Flamengo, who after four years, won their second title of the NBB.

== Teams ==
Team	Home city	Arena	Capacity
Bauru	Bauru	Ginásio Panela de Pressão	2,000
Botafogo	Rio de Janeiro	Ginásio Oscar Zelaya	1,500
Brasília	Brasília	Nilson Nelson Gymnasium	11,397
Caxias do Sul	Caxias do Sul	Ginásio do SESI	4,500
Corinthians	São Paulo	Ginásio Wlamir Marques	6,500
Flamengo	Rio de Janeiro	Ginásio do Maracanãzinho	11,800
Fortaleza/Cearense	Fortaleza	Centro de Formação Olímpica	17,100
Franca	Franca	Ginásio Pedrocão	6,000
Minas	Belo Horizonte	Juscelino Kubitschek Arena	4,000
Mogi das Cruzes	Mogi das Cruzes	Ginásio Professor Hugo Ramos	5,000
Pato	Pato Branco	Ginásio do SESI	1,000
Paulistano	São Paulo	Ginásio Antônio Prado Junior	1,280
Pinheiros	São Paulo	Poliesportivo Henrique Villaboim	850
São José	São José dos Campos	Ginásio Lineu de Moura	2,620
São Paulo	São Paulo	Ginásio do Morumbi	1,918
União Corinthians	Santa Cruz do Sul	Ginásio Poliesportivo Arnão	6,000
Unifacisa	Campina Grande	Arena Unifacisa	1,200
Vasco	Rio de Janeiro	Ginásio Vasco da Gama	1,000

== Results ==
Season	Champion	Final result	Runner-up	Season MVP	Coach of the Year
2009	Flamengo (1)	3–2 (series)	Brasília	(Brazil) Marcelinho Machado (FLA)	(Brazil) Paulo Sampaio (FLA)
2009–10	Brasília (1)	3–2 (series)	Flamengo	(Brazil) Marcelinho Machado (FLA)	(Brazil) Lula Ferreira (BRA)
2010–11	Brasília (2)	3–1 (series)	Franca	(Brazil) Guilherme Giovannoni (BRA)	(Brazil) Hélio Rubens (FRA)
2011–12	Brasília (3)	78–62	São José	(Brazil) Murilo Becker (SJO)	(Brazil) Régis Marrelli (SJO)
2012–13	Flamengo (2)	77–70	Uberlândia	(Brazil) Marquinhos (FLA)	(Brazil) Lula Ferreira (FRA)
2013–14	Flamengo (3)	78–73	Paulistano	(United States) David Jackson (LIM)	(Brazil) Gustavo de Conti (PAU)
2014–15	Flamengo (4)	2–0 (series)	Bauru	(Brazil) Alex Garcia (BAU)	(Brazil) Dedé Barbosa (LIM)
2015–16	Flamengo (5)	3–2 (series)	Bauru	(Brazil) Marquinhos (FLA)	(Brazil) José Alves Neto (FLA)
2016–17	Bauru (1)	3–2 (series)	Paulistano	(United States) Desmond Holloway (PIN)	(Brazil) Gustavo de Conti (PAU)
2017–18	Paulistano (1)	3–1 (series)	Mogi das Cruzes	(Brazil) Marquinhos (FLA)	(Brazil) Gustavo de Conti (PAU)
2018–19	Flamengo (6)	3–2 (series)	Franca	(Brazil) J.P. Batista (MOG)	(Brazil) Léo Figueiró (BOT)
2019–20	Canceled after the regular season due to the COVID-19 pandemic in Brazil				
2020–21	Flamengo (7)	3–0 (series)	São Paulo	(Brazil) Lucas Mariano (SPA)	(Brazil) Gustavo de Conti (FLA)
2021–22	Franca (1)	3–1 (series)	Flamengo	(Brazil) Bruno Caboclo (SPA)	(Brazil) Helinho Garcia (FRA)
2022–23	Franca (2)	3–2 (series)	São Paulo	(Brazil) Lucas Dias (FRA)	(Brazil) Helinho Garcia (FRA)
2023–24	Franca (3)	3–1 (series)	Flamengo	(Brazil) Lucas Dias (FRA)	(Brazil) Paulo Cézar Jaú (BAU)
2024–25	Franca (4)	3–1 (series)	Minas	(United States) Dontrell Brite (BAU)	(Brazil) Léo Costa (MIN)
2025–26	Franca (5)	3–1 (series)	Pinheiros	(Brazil) Georginho de Paula (FRA)	(Brazil) Gustavo de Conti (PIN)

== Titles by club ==
Teams	Win	Loss	Total	Year(s) won	Year(s) lost
Flamengo	7	3	10	2009, 2013, 2014, 2015, 2016, 2019, 2021	2010, 2022, 2024
Franca	5	2	6	2022, 2023, 2024, 2025, 2026	2011, 2019
Brasília	3	1	4	2010, 2011, 2012	2009
Bauru	1	2	3	2017	2015, 2016
Paulistano	1	2	3	2018	2014, 2017
São Paulo	0	2	2	—	2021, 2023
São José	0	1	1	—	2012
Uberlândia	0	1	1	—	2013
Mogi das Cruzes	0	1	1	—	2018
Minas	0	1	1	—	2025
Pinheiros	0	1	1	—	2026

== All-Star Weekend ==
Similarly to other basketball leagues around the world, the NBB organises an all-star game, which showcases the best players of the league. In addition to the game, a dunk contest, three-point contest and "Skills Challenge" are organised.

== Records ==
- Marcelinho Machado scored 63 points in the match between Flamengo and São José (101–89), in 2010, at the Arena da Barra. He scored 16 three-pointers (16/21 attempts)
- Marquinhos has been elected MVP (most valuable player) three times in the NBB (2012/13, 2015/16 and 2017/18)
- In 2010, Murilo Becker scored 16 two-pointers for Tenis Minas against Saldanha (102–85). His record was equaled in 2019 by Batista, for Mogi, against Joinville.
- Fúlvio distributed 21 assists for São José against Uberlândia (94–97) in 2018. In that match he broke his own record, of 18 assists
- The highest rebounder in a single game of the NBB, was Leonardo and Mãozinha. Leozão was the first to reach the mark of 24 rebounds in the game between Basquete Cearense and Campo Mourão (77–69) in 2018. It was equaled in the 2021 edition by Mãozinha for Corinthians against Basquete Cearense (126–122).
- Point guard Anthony has the most free throws mark in NBB history scoring 19 for Macaé Basquete against Caxias do Sul (73–67), in 2017. In the game, he attempted 21 free throws (success rate of around 90%).

=== Players with most games ===
Source: Veja recordes do NBB

As of the first round of the 2022–23 season.

Rank	Player	Games	Career
1	(Brazil) Carlos Olivinha	495	
2	(United States) (Brazil) Shamell Stallworth	471	
3	(United States) (Brazil) Larry Taylor	461	
4	(Brazil) Alex	460	
4	(Brazil) Jhonatan Luz	460	
6	(Brazil) Rafael Mineiro	451	
7	(Brazil) Marquinhos Vieira	450	
8	(Brazil) Jefferson William	443	
9	(Brazil) Shilton dos Santos	434	
10	(Brazil) Guilherme Teichmann	430	

=== All-time scorers ===
Source: Veja recordes do NBB

As of the first round of the 2022–23 season.

Rank	Player	Points	Games	Career	Average
1	(United States) (Brazil) Shamell Stallworth	8,374	471		
2	(Brazil) Marquinhos Vieira	7,977	450		
3	(Brazil) Alex	7,161	460		
4	(Brazil) Carlos Olivinha	6,558	495		
5	(United States) (Brazil) Larry Taylor	5,987	461		
6	(Brazil) Jefferson William	5,884	443		
7	(Brazil) Guilherme Giovannoni	5,792	349		
8	(Brazil) Marcelinho Machado	5,709	314		
9	(Brazil) Betinho Duarte	5,471	417		
10	(Brazil) Lucas Mariano	5,208	380		

== Notable players ==
- (Brazil) Rafael "Bábby" Araújo
- (Brazil) Leandro Barbosa
- (Brazil) Anderson Varejão
- (Brazil) Vítor Benite
- (Brazil) Valtinho da Silva
- (Brazil) Bruno Caboclo
- (Brazil) Gui Santos
- (Brazil) Cristiano Felício
- (Brazil) Alex Garcia
- (Brazil) Guilherme Giovannoni
- (Brazil) Vítor Faverani
- (Brazil) Didi Louzada
- (Brazil) Rafael Luz
- (Brazil) Duda Machado
- (Brazil) Marcelinho Machado
- (Brazil) Carlos Olivinha
- (Brazil) Raul Neto
- (Brazil) Fab Melo
- (Brazil) Marquinhos Vieira
- (Brazil) Lucas Nogueira
- (Brazil) / (United States) Larry Taylor
- (Argentina) Juan Pablo Figueroa
- (Argentina) Walter Herrmann
- (Argentina) Federico Kammerichs
- (Argentina) Nicolás Laprovíttola
- (Argentina) Facundo Sucatzky
- (Argentina) Franco Balbi
- (Panama) Joel Muñoz
- (Dominican Republic) Ronald Ramón
- (United States) Darington Hobson
- (United States) Marc Brown
- (United States) Robby Collum
- (United States) Tyrone Curnell
- (United States) Robert Day
- (United States) Kyle Fuller
- (United States) Desmond Holloway
- (United States) David Jackson
- (United States) Kyle Lamonte
- (United States) Jerome Meyinsse
- (United States) Bernard Robinson
- (United States) Joseph Shipp
- (United States) Shamell Stallworth
- (United States) Rashad McCants

== See also ==
- Brazilian Championship
- São Paulo State Championship
- Rio de Janeiro State Championship
