= Club Athletico Paulistano (basketball) =

- Leagues: NBB; LSB
- Founded: 29 December 1900; 125 years ago 1922; 104 years ago (basketball department)
- Arena: Ginásio Antônio Prado Junior
- Capacity: 1,500
- Location: São Paulo, Brazil
- President: José Manuel Castro Santos
- Head coach: Regis Marrelli
- Championships: 1 NBB Championship
- Website: paulistano.org.br
Home	Away

Club Athletico Paulistano, abbreviated as C.A. Paulistano or C.A.P., is the senior men's basketball section of the Brazilian multi-sports club Club Athletico Paulistano (C.A.P.), which is based in São Paulo, Brazil. The team competes in the top-tier level Brazilian league, the Novo Basquete Brasil (NBB). For sponsorship reasons, the club is also currently known as Paulistano/Corpore, or Paulistano Corpore.

== History ==
Paulistano was the first team of point guard Marcelinho Huertas, long-time player and captain of the senior Brazilian national basketball team. In the NBB 2009–10 season, the club's managers signed center Rafael "Bàbby" Araújo, who had just a been Brazilian national league champion with C.R. Flamengo, a season before. But the team did not have a good season, and finished the season in eleventh place in the Brazilian NBB League. The following NBB 2010–11 season was even worse than the previous one, and Paulistano finished the season in twelfth place in the NBB.

In the NBB 2011–12 season, under the guidance of head coach Gustavo de Conti, and led on the court by the young players Elinho Neto and Betinho Duarte, Paulistano had the best NBB season in the club's history, as they finished in seventh place in the regular season standings. In the NBB playoffs, the experienced team of Franca defeated the young team from São Paulo. In the following NBB 2012–13 season, Paulistano lost Betinho Duarte to Minas, and Guillermo Araújo to its greatest rival, E.C. Pinheiros.

== Honors and titles ==
=== International ===
- Youth Basketball Champions League Americas
  - Champions (1): 2026

=== National ===
- Brazilian Championship
  - Champions (1): 2018
  - Runners-up (2): 2014, 2017
- Brazilian Super Cup
  - Runners-up (1): 2003

=== Regional ===
- São Paulo State Championship
  - Champions (2): 2017, 2023
  - Runners-up (4): 2005, 2009, 2013 2018

=== Inter-regional ===
- Copa Brasil Sul
  - Champions (1): 2003

== Players ==
=== Current roster ===
Note: Flags indicate national team eligibility at FIBA-sanctioned events. Players may hold other non-FIBA nationalities not displayed.

Paulistano roster
Players
Coaches

Pos.	No.	Nat.	Name	Ht.	Wt.	Age
PG	1	(Dominican Republic)	Gelvis Solano
PG	2	(Brazil)	dos Santos, Yago	1.78 m (5 ft 10 in)	73 kg (161 lb)	27 – 9 March 1999
C	3	(United States)	Kevin Foster
PG	4	(Brazil)	Felipe Ruivo
SG	5	(Brazil)	Fagundes Filho, Beto	1.89 m (6 ft 2 in)	81 kg (179 lb)	26 – 15 May 2000
SG	7	(United States)	Coleman, Dominique	1.93 m (6 ft 4 in)	90 kg (198 lb)	37 – 26 November 1988
G/F	9	(Brazil)	Onwenu, Daniel	1.94 m (6 ft 4 in)	77 kg (170 lb)	23 – 7 November 2002
C	10	(Brazil)	da Silva, Victão	2.03 m (6 ft 8 in)	108 kg (238 lb)	29 – 6 April 1997
C	12	(Brazil)	Rafael Correa
SG	16	(Brazil)	da Silva, Matheus	1.89 m (6 ft 2 in)	81 kg (179 lb)	25 – 26 April 2001
C	20	(Brazil)	André, Dikembe	2.06 m (6 ft 9 in)	111 kg (245 lb)	27 – 19 August 1999
SG	32	(Brazil)	Barbosa, Anderson	1.92 m (6 ft 4 in)	90 kg (198 lb)	26 – 3 July 2000
SF	33	(Brazil)	Carvalho, Eddy	1.94 m (6 ft 4 in)	100 kg (220 lb)	29 – 29 March 1997
C	35	(Brazil)	de Oliveira, Maique	2.11 m (6 ft 11 in)	100 kg (220 lb)	30 – 26 June 1996
G	50	(Brazil)	Jonatan Oliveira

Head coach

- (Brazil) Regis Marrelli

Assistant coach(es)

- (Brazil) Eran Sherzer
- (Brazil) Roberto Jayme

Legend

- (C) Team captain
- Injured

- Roster
Updated: 20 February 2020

== Notable players ==
To appear in this section a player must have either:
- Set a club record or won an individual award as a professional player.
- Played at least one official international match for his senior national team at any time.

- (Brazil) Rafael Araújo
- (Brazil) Guilherme Hubner
- (Brazil) Antonio Ferreira Junior
- (Brazil) Marcelinho Huertas
- (Brazil) Renan Lenz
- (Brazil) Pedro Lima
- (Brazil) Manteguinha
- (Brazil) Léonardo Meindl
- (Brazil) George de Paula
- (Brazil) Fernando Penna
- (Brazil) Deryk Ramos
- (Dominican Republic) Gelvis Solano
- (United States) Kenny Dawkins
- (United States) Desmond Holloway
- (United States) Evan Roquemore

== Head coaches ==
- (Brazil) José Neto
- (Brazil) Gustavo de Conti

== See also ==
- Club Athletico Paulistano
