= Campeonato Carioca Estadual de Basquete =

Basketball competition in Brazil

Campeonato Carioca Estadual de Basquete Carioca State Basketball Championship
- Founded: 1924; 102 years ago
- Country: Brazil
- Current champions: (Brazil) Flamengo
- Most championships: (Brazil) Flamengo (48 titles)
- Website: www.basketrio.com.br/v1/index.asp

The Campeonato Carioca Estadual de Basquete (English: Carioca State Basketball Championship), or Rio de Janeiro State Basketball Championship, is an annual men's professional club basketball competition. The tournament is contested between clubs from Rio de Janeiro State, Brazil.

== History ==
The Campeonato Carioca (Carioca Championship) basketball competition began in 1924. The Carioca Championship was not contested in the year 2017. It is organized by the FBERJ, the local federation.

== Carioca (Rio de Janeiro) State champions ==
Year	Champion	Result	Runner-up	Info
1924	sinmarco Fluminense		sinmarco Flamengo
1925	sinmarco Fluminense		sinmarco Bangu
1926	sinmarco Fluminense		sinmarco Bangu
1927	sinmarco Fluminense		sinmarco São Cristóvão
1928	sinmarco Sport Brasil		sinmarco Olaria
1929	sinmarco São Cristóvão		sinmarco America
1930	sinmarco São Cristóvão		sinmarco Fluminense
1931	sinmarco Fluminense		sinmarco São Cristóvão
1932	sinmarco Flamengo		sinmarco America
1933	sinmarco Flamengo		sinmarco Riachuelo
1934	sinmarco Flamengo		sinmarco Botafogo
1935	sinmarco Flamengo		sinmarco Riachuelo
1936	sinmarco Grajaú		sinmarco Riachuelo
1937	sinmarco Riachuelo		sinmarco Botafogo
1938	sinmarco Olympico		sinmarco Riachuelo
1939	sinmarco Botafogo		sinmarco Riachuelo
1940	sinmarco Riachuelo		sinmarco Vasco da Gama
1941	sinmarco Riachuelo		sinmarco Botafogo
1942	sinmarco Botafogo		sinmarco Fluminense
1943	sinmarco Botafogo		sinmarco Vasco da Gama
1944	sinmarco Botafogo		sinmarco Fluminense
1945	sinmarco Botafogo		sinmarco Tijuca
1946	sinmarco Vasco da Gama		sinmarco Botafogo
1947	sinmarco Botafogo		sinmarco Vasco da Gama
1948	sinmarco Flamengo		sinmarco Fluminense
1949	sinmarco Flamengo		sinmarco Fluminense
1950	sinmarco Grajaú Country		sinmarco Flamengo
1951	sinmarco Flamengo		sinmarco Botafogo
1952	sinmarco Flamengo		sinmarco Fluminense
1953	sinmarco Flamengo		sinmarco Sírio
1954	sinmarco Flamengo		sinmarco Sírio
1955	sinmarco Flamengo		sinmarco Sírio
1956	sinmarco Flamengo		sinmarco Sírio
1957	sinmarco Flamengo		sinmarco Vasco da Gama
1958	sinmarco Flamengo		sinmarco Fluminense
1959	sinmarco Flamengo		sinmarco Fluminense
1960	sinmarco Flamengo		sinmarco Tijuca
1961	sinmarco Fluminense		sinmarco Tijuca
1962	sinmarco Flamengo		sinmarco Fluminense
1963	sinmarco Vasco da Gama		sinmarco Flamengo
1964	sinmarco Flamengo		sinmarco Vasco da Gama
1965	sinmarco Vasco da Gama		sinmarco Botafogo
1966	sinmarco Botafogo		sinmarco Vasco da Gama
1967	sinmarco Botafogo		sinmarco Vasco da Gama
1968	sinmarco Botafogo		sinmarco Vasco da Gama
1969	sinmarco Vasco da Gama		sinmarco Municipal
1970	sinmarco Fluminense	2–0	sinmarco Municipal
1971	sinmarco Fluminense		sinmarco Vasco da Gama
1972	sinmarco Fluminense		sinmarco Vasco da Gama
1973	sinmarco Fluminense	2–1	sinmarco Botafogo
1974	sinmarco Fluminense		sinmarco Vasco da Gama
1975	sinmarco Flamengo		sinmarco Vasco da Gama
1976	sinmarco Vasco da Gama		sinmarco Flamengo
1977	sinmarco Flamengo	Hexagonal Final	sinmarco Vasco da Gama
1978	sinmarco Vasco da Gama		sinmarco Municipal
1979	sinmarco Vasco da Gama		sinmarco Fluminense
1980	sinmarco Vasco da Gama		sinmarco Fluminense
1981	sinmarco Vasco da Gama		sinmarco Flamengo
1982	sinmarco Flamengo		sinmarco Fluminense
1983	sinmarco Vasco da Gama		sinmarco Flamengo
1984	sinmarco Flamengo		sinmarco Vasco da Gama
1985	sinmarco Flamengo	Pentagonal Final	sinmarco Bradesco
1986	sinmarco Flamengo		sinmarco America
1987	sinmarco Vasco da Gama	2–1	sinmarco Flamengo
1988	sinmarco Fluminense		sinmarco Flamengo
1989	sinmarco Vasco da Gama		sinmarco Flamengo
1990	sinmarco Flamengo		sinmarco Vasco da Gama
1991	sinmarco Botafogo	2–0	sinmarco Flamengo
1992	sinmarco Vasco da Gama	2–1	sinmarco Angrense
1993	sinmarco Angrense	3–2	sinmarco Tijuca
1994	sinmarco Flamengo	2–1	sinmarco Tijuca
1995	sinmarco Flamengo	2–1	sinmarco Tijuca
1996	sinmarco Flamengo	3–0	sinmarco Tijuca
1997	sinmarco Vasco da Gama	3–2	sinmarco Flamengo
1998	sinmarco Flamengo	3–2	sinmarco Vasco da Gama
1999	sinmarco Flamengo	3–0	sinmarco Botafogo
2000	sinmarco Vasco da Gama	3–2	sinmarco Botafogo
2001	sinmarco Vasco da Gama	3–1	sinmarco Flamengo
2002	sinmarco Flamengo	3–2	sinmarco Automóvel Clube
2003	sinmarco Automóvel Clube	3–1	sinmarco Flamengo
2004	sinmarco Telemar	3–0	sinmarco Automóvel Clube
2005	sinmarco Flamengo	2–1	sinmarco Telemar
2006	sinmarco Flamengo	2–0	sinmarco Telemar
2007	sinmarco Flamengo	2–0	sinmarco Vasco da Gama
2008	sinmarco Flamengo	2–0	sinmarco Cabofriense
2009	sinmarco Flamengo	2–0	sinmarco Municipal
2010	sinmarco Flamengo	2–0	sinmarco Tijuca
2011	sinmarco Flamengo	2–0	sinmarco Tijuca
2012	sinmarco Flamengo	2–0	sinmarco Tijuca
2013	sinmarco Flamengo	2–0	sinmarco Macaé
2014	sinmarco Flamengo	2–0	sinmarco Macaé
2015	sinmarco Flamengo	2–0	sinmarco Macaé
2016	sinmarco Flamengo	2–1	sinmarco Vasco da Gama
2017	Not held
2018	sinmarco Flamengo	2–0	sinmarco Botafogo
2019	sinmarco Flamengo	2–1	sinmarco Botafogo
2020	sinmarco Flamengo	104–40 (single match)	sinmarco Tijuca
2021	sinmarco Flamengo	91–61 (single match)	sinmarco Mesquita
2022	sinmarco Flamengo	109–40 (single match)	sinmarco Municipal
2023	sinmarco Flamengo	115 - 58 (single match)	sinmarco Municipal

== Titles by club ==
Club	Championships	Years won	Runners-up	Years runner-up
Flamengo	49	1932, 1933, 1934, 1935, 1948, 1949, 1951, 1952, 1953, 1954, 1955, 1956, 1957, 1958, 1959, 1960, 1962, 1964, 1975, 1977, 1982, 1984, 1985, 1986, 1990, 1994, 1995, 1996, 1998, 1999, 2002, 2005, 2006, 2007, 2008, 2009, 2010, 2011, 2012, 2013, 2014, 2015, 2016, 2018, 2019, 2020, 2021, 2022, 2023	13	1924, 1950, 1963, 1976, 1981, 1983, 1987, 1988, 1989, 1991, 1997, 2001, 2003
C.R. Vasco da Gama	16	1946, 1963, 1965, 1969, 1976, 1978, 1979, 1980, 1981, 1983, 1987, 1989, 1992, 1997, 2000, 2001	18	1940, 1943, 1947, 1957, 1964, 1966, 1967, 1968, 1971, 1972, 1974, 1975, 1977, 1984, 1990, 1998, 2007, 2016
Fluminense Basquetbol Club	12	1924, 1925, 1926, 1927, 1931, 1961, 1970, 1971, 1972, 1973, 1974, 1988	11	1930, 1942, 1948, 1949, 1952, 1958, 1959, 1962, 1979, 1980, 1982
Botafogo F.R.	10	1939, 1942, 1943, 1944, 1945, 1947, 1966, 1967, 1968, 1991	10	1934, 1937, 1941, 1946, 1951, 1965, 1973, 1999, 2000, 2018
Riachuelo Tênis Clube Basquetbol	3	1937, 1940, 1941	5	1933, 1935, 1936, 1938, 1939
São Cristóvão de Futebol e Regatas Basquetbol	2	1929, 1930	2	1927, 1931
Automóvel Clube Basquetbol	1	2003	2	2002, 2004
Telemar Basquetbaol	1	2004	2	2005, 2006
Liga Angrense Basquetbol	1	1993	1	1992
Sport Club Brasil Basquetbol	1	1929	0	
Grajaú Tênis Clube Basquetbol	1	1936	0	
Olympico Club (Rio de Janeiro) Basquetbol	1	1938	0	
Grajaú Country Club Basquetbol	1	1950	0	
Tijuca T.C	0		10	1945, 1960, 1961, 1993, 1994, 1995, 1996, 2010, 2011, 2012
Municipal Basquetbol	0		5	1969, 1970, 1978, 2009, 2023
Clube Sírio e Libanês do Rio de Janeiro Basquetbol	0		4	1953, 1954, 1955, 1956
Macaé	0		3	2013, 2014, 2015
América-RJ Basquetbol	0		3	1929, 1932, 1986
Bangu	0		2	1925, 1926
Olaria	0		1	1928
Bradesco Basquetebol	0		1	1985
Liga de Basquetebol de Cabo Frio	0		1	2008

== Records ==
- Marx Martins Rodrigues Carvalho, is the player who scored the most points in a single match, in the entire history of the FBERJ (Rio de Janeiro State Basketball Federation). He scored 129 points, on September 16, 1984, in a match between Vasco and Hebraica. His feat was recorded on the Guinness World Records at the time.
- Oscar Schmidt played most consecutive games in the RJ State League (90), with Flamengo

== Topscorers ==
=== Per total points ===
Year	Player	Team	Points	Pld
1999	(Brazil) Oscar Schmidt	Flamengo	651	20
2000	(Brazil) Oscar Schmidt	Flamengo	627	23
2001	(Brazil) Oscar Schmidt	Flamengo	443	16
2002	(Brazil) Oscar Schmidt	Flamengo	349	12
2003	(Brazil) Alexey Carvalho	Vasco	366	14

=== Per game ===
Year	Player	Team	Points	Pld
1999	(Brazil) Oscar Schmidt	Flamengo	32,60	20
2000	(Brazil) Oscar Schmidt	Flamengo	36.9	23
2001	(Brazil) Paulinho	Action Macaé	28,2	10
2002	(Brazil) Oscar Schmidt	Flamengo	29,1	12
2003	(Brazil) Alexey Carvalho	Vasco	26,14	14
2010	(Brazil) Marcellus Camara	Cabo Frio	21.5	
2012	(Brazil) César Fabretti	Tijuca	20.6	
2014	(Brazil) Marcellus Camara	Vasco	24,2	

=== Single Finals ===
Year	Player	Team	Points
2020	(Brazil) (Spain) Rafael Hettsheimeir	Flamengo	18

== Stats leaders ==
=== Assists ===
Year	Player	Team	Assists	Pld	Average
1999	(Brazil) Demétrius Conrado Ferraciú	Vasco	145	24	6,60
2000	(Brazil) Ratto	Flamengo	119	17	7,0
2001	(Brazil) Ratto	Flamengo	106	16	6,6
2002	(Brazil) Alberto	Flamengo	80	12	6,7
2003	(Brazil) Matheus Costa	Automóvel	100	20	5,00

=== Rebounds ===
Year	Player	Team	Rebounds	Pld	Average
1999	(Brazil) Marcelão	Botafogo	241	22	11,00
2000	(Brazil) Gema	Fluminense	169	18	9.4
2001	(Brazil) Roberto	Action Macaé	141	10	14,1
2002	(Brazil) Marcelão	Flamengo	135	11	11,3
2003	(Brazil) Marcelo Pereira	Flamengo	166	21	7,90

=== Blocks ===
Year	Player	Team	Blocks	Pld	Average
1999	(Brazil) Josuel	Flamengo	40	20	2,00
2000	(Brazil) Nenete	A Clube Campos	26	14	1.86
2002	(Brazil) Carlos Olivinha	Flamengo	20	12	1,67
2003	(Brazil) Marcelo Lamônica	Angra	33	14	2,36

=== Slam-dunks ===
Year	Dunks	Team	Assists	Pld	Average
1999	(Brazil) Keith Nelson		28	20	1,4

== Winning rosters ==
- Flamengo 1998 (Ze Boquinha): Askia Jones, Pipoka, Ratto, Kendrick Warren, Almir, Caio, Marcelao
- Flamengo 1999 (Claudio Mortari): Duda, Ratto, Bruno Mortari, Bento, Caio, Paulinho Villas Boas, Josuel, Pipoka, Greg Newton, Robyn Davis, Oscar Schmidt.
- Vasco 2000 (Hélio Rubens): Helinho, Jose Vargas, Demétrius Conrado Ferraciú, Manteiguinha, Charles Byrd, Joélcio Joerke, Rogério, Aylton, Jefferson Sobral, Guilherme Teichmann, Sandro Varejão, Mingão, Janjão, Nenê.
- Vasco 2001 (Hélio Rubens): Helinho, Manteiguinha, Charles Byrd, Sandro Varejão, Mingão, Mike Higgins, Jamison, Nenê, Rogério, Alexandre, Diego.
- Flamengo 2002 (Miguel Angelo da Luz): Alberto, Carlos Olivinha, Oscar Schmidt, Alexey, Gema, Ricardinho, Andre Brazolin, Marcelão, Guto, Marcelinho Leal.

== See also ==
- New Basket Brazil (NBB)
- Brazilian Championship
- São Paulo State Championship

== Sources ==
- Relembre os títulos cariocas de basquete do Mengão
