= 2000 Liga Sudamericana de Básquetbol =

Liga Sudamericana de Básquetbol
- Season: 2000
- Dates: 16 February – 17 April 2000
- Teams: 16

Finals
- Champions: (Brazil) Vasco da Gama
- Runners-up: (Argentina) Atenas
- Semifinalists: (Brazil) Marathon Franca (Uruguay) Welcome

The 2000 Liga Sudamericana de Básquetbol, or 2000 FIBA South American League, was the fifth edition of the second-tier tournament for professional basketball clubs from South America. The tournament began on 16 February 2000, and finished on 17 April 2000. Brazilian team Vasco da Gama won their second title, defeating Argentine club Atenas in the Grand Finals.

== Format ==
Teams were split into four groups of four teams each, and played each other in a round-robin format. The top two teams from each group advanced to the final stage, a best-of-three direct playoff elimination in the quarterfinals and the semifinals, and a best-of-five elimination series in the Grand Finals, where the champion was decided.

== Teams ==
Country	Team
Argentina	Atenas
Argentina	Boca Juniors
Argentina	Independiente de General Pico
Bolivia	UTEPSA
Brazil	Marathon Franca
Brazil	Vasco Barueri
Brazil	Vasco da Gama
Chile	Provincial Osorno
Chile	Universidad de Concepción
Colombia	Caimanes de Barranquilla
Ecuador	UTE
Paraguay	Sol de América
Peru	Universidad Alas Peruanas
Uruguay	Cordón
Uruguay	Welcome
Venezuela	Trotamundos de Carabobo

== Group stage ==
=== Group A ===
Pos	Team	Pld	W	L	Pts	Qualification
1	(Argentina) Atenas	3	3	0	6	Advances to final stage
2	(Brazil) Vasco Barueri	3	2	1	5	Advances to final stage
3	(Chile) Universidad de Concepción	3	1	2	4	
4	(Uruguay) Cordón	3	0	3	3	

Source: FIBA Archive

23 February 2000	Atenas (Argentina)	103–63	(Uruguay) Cordón	Concepción, Chile

23 February 2000	Universidad de Concepción (Chile)	69–76	(Brazil) Vasco Barueri	Concepción, Chile

24 February 2000	Vasco Barueri (Brazil)	68–62	(Uruguay) Cordón	Concepción, Chile

24 February 2000	Universidad de Concepción (Chile)	52–84	(Argentina) Atenas	Concepción, Chile

25 February 1999	Atenas (Argentina)	79–64	(Brazil) Vasco Barueri	Concepción, Chile

25 February 2000	Universidad de Concepción (Chile)	77–70	(Uruguay) Cordón	Concepción, Chile

=== Group B ===
Pos	Team	Pld	W	L	Pts	Qualification
1	(Brazil) Vasco da Gama	3	3	0	6	Advances to final stage
2	(Venezuela) Trotamundos de Carabobo	3	2	1	5	Advances to final stage
3	(Colombia) Caimanes de Barranquilla	3	1	2	4	
4	(Ecuador) UTE	3	0	3	3	

Source: FIBA Archive

16 February 2000	Vasco da Gama (Brazil)	94–68	(Venezuela) Trotamundos de Carabobo	Barranquilla, Colombia

16 February 2000	Caimanes de Barranquilla (Colombia)	93–79	(Ecuador) UTE	Barranquilla, Colombia

17 February 2000	Vasco da Gama (Brazil)	106–54	(Ecuador) UTE	Barranquilla, Colombia

17 February 2000	Caimanes de Barranquilla (Colombia)	74–80	(Venezuela) Trotamundos de Carabobo	Barranquilla, Colombia

18 February 2000	UTE (Ecuador)	64–95	(Venezuela) Trotamundos de Carabobo	Barranquilla, Colombia

18 February 2000	Caimanes de Barranquilla (Colombia)	75–85	(Brazil) Vasco da Gama	Barranquilla, Colombia

=== Group C ===
Pos	Team	Pld	W	L	Pts	Qualification
1	(Brazil) Marathon Franca	3	3	0	6	Advances to final stage
2	(Argentina) Boca Juniors	3	1	2	4	Advances to final stage
3	(Peru) Universidad Alas Peruanas	3	1	2	4	
4	(Chile) Provincial Osorno	3	1	2	4	

Source: FIBA Archive

21 February 2000	Boca Juniors (Argentina)	70–77	(Brazil) Marathon Franca	Lima, Peru
				Arena: Coliseo Eduardo Dibos

21 February 2000	Universidad Alas Peruanas (Peru)	79–85	(Chile) Provincial Osorno	Lima, Peru
				Arena: Coliseo Eduardo Dibos

22 February 2000	Boca Juniors (Argentina)	81–63	(Chile) Provincial Osorno	Lima, Peru
				Arena: Coliseo Eduardo Dibos

22 February 2000	Universidad Alas Peruanas (Peru)	65–84	(Brazil) Marathon Franca	Lima, Peru
				Arena: Coliseo Eduardo Dibos

23 February 2000	Marathon Franca (Brazil)	101–89	(Chile) Provincial Osorno	Lima, Peru
				Arena: Coliseo Eduardo Dibos

23 February 2000	Universidad Alas Peruanas (Peru)	66–62	(Brazil) Boca Juniors	Lima, Peru
				Arena: Coliseo Eduardo Dibos

=== Group D ===
Pos	Team	Pld	W	L	Pts	Qualification
1	(Uruguay) Welcome	3	3	0	6	Advances to final stage
2	(Argentina) Independiente de General Pico	3	2	1	5	Advances to final stage
3	(Paraguay) Sol de América	3	1	2	4	
4	(Bolivia) UTEPSA	3	0	3	3	

Source: FIBA Archive

16 February 2000	Independiente de General Pico (Argentina)	88–79	(Paraguay) Sol de América	Montevideo, Uruguay

16 February 2000	Welcome (Uruguay)	107–58	(Bolivia) UTEPSA	Montevideo, Uruguay

17 February 2000	Independiente de General Pico (Argentina)	95–70	(Bolivia) UTEPSA	Montevideo, Uruguay

17 February 2000	Welcome (Uruguay)	103–72	(Paraguay) Sol de América	Montevideo, Uruguay

18 February 2000	Sol de América (Paraguay)	101–84	(Bolivia) UTEPSA	Montevideo, Uruguay

18 February 2000	Welcome (Uruguay)	83–71	(Argentina) Independiente de General Pico	Montevideo, Uruguay

== Final stage ==
Quarterfinals
(Argentina) Atenas	2
(Venezuela) Trotamundos de Carabobo	1
(Uruguay) Welcome	2
(Argentina) Boca Juniors	0
(Brazil) Marathon Franca	2
(Argentina) Independiente de General Pico	0
(Brazil) Vasco da Gama	2
(Brazil) Vasco Barueri	0

Semifinals
(Argentina) Atenas	2
(Uruguay) Welcome	0
(Brazil) Marathon Franca	0
(Brazil) Vasco da Gama	2

Finals
(Argentina) Atenas	2
(Brazil) Vasco da Gama	3

=== Quarterfinals ===
==== Game 1 ====
28 February 2000	Boca Juniors (Argentina)	73–75 (Series: 0–1)	(Uruguay) Welcome	Buenos Aires, Argentina
	Pts: O'Bannon 24		Pts: Szczygielsk 17	Arena: Estadio Luis Conde

2 March 2000	Vasco Barueri (Brazil)	97–100 (Series: 0–1)	(Brazil) Vasco da Gama	Barueri, Brazil

3 March 2000	Trotamundos de Carabobo (Venezuela)	70–59 (Series: 1–0)	(Argentina) Atenas	Valencia, Venezuela
	Pts: Dalmau 19		Pts: Campana, Milanesio 14	Arena: Forum de Valencia

3 March 2000	Independiente de General Pico (Argentina)	85–96 (Series: 0–1)	(Brazil) Marathon Franca	General Pico, Argentina
	Pts: Sucatzky 25		Pts: Jorginho 21

==== Game 2 ====
13 March 2000	Marathon Franca (Brazil)	88–81 (Series: 2–0)	(Argentina) Independiente de General Pico	Franca, Brazil
	Pts: Douglas 20		Pts: Malara, Sucatzky 14	Arena: Ginásio Pedrocão

14 March 2000	Vasco da Gama (Brazil)	83–73 (Series: 2–0)	(Brazil) Vasco Barueri	Rio de Janeiro, Brazil

15 March 2000	Atenas (Argentina)	92–57 (Series: 1–1)	(Venezuela) Trotamundos de Carabobo	Córdoba, Argentina
	Pts: Osborne 19		Pts: Dalmau 22	Arena: Polideportivo Municipal Carlos Cerutti

17 March 2000	Welcome (Uruguay)	71–64 (Series: 2–0)	(Argentina) Boca Juniors	Montevideo, Uruguay
	Pts: Owens 15		Pts: O'Bannon 18

==== Game 3 ====
16 March 2000	Atenas (Argentina)	77–65 (Series: 2–1)	(Venezuela) Trotamundos de Carabobo	Córdoba, Argentina
	Pts: Campana 23		Pts: Nwosu 18	Arena: Polideportivo Municipal Carlos Cerutti

=== Semifinals ===
==== Game 1 ====
24 March 2000	Atenas (Argentina)	83–55 (Series: 1–0)	(Uruguay) Welcome	Córdoba, Argentina
	Pts: Campana 19		Pts: Moglia 12	Arena: Polideportivo Municipal Carlos Cerutti

27 March 2000	Vasco da Gama (Brazil)	82–57 (Series: 1–0)	(Brazil) Marathon Franca	Rio de Janeiro, Brazil

==== Game 2 ====
1 April 2000	Welcome (Uruguay)	85–90 (Series: 0–2)	(Argentina) Atenas	Montevideo, Uruguay

3 April 2000	Marathon Franca (Brazil)	86–96 (Series: 0–2)	(Brazil) Vasco da Gama	Franca, Brazil

=== Grand Finals ===
10 April 2000	Vasco da Gama (Brazil)	71–78 (Series: 0–1)	(Argentina) Atenas	Rio de Janeiro, Brazil

11 April 2000	Vasco da Gama (Brazil)	70–67 (Series: 1–1)	(Argentina) Atenas	Rio de Janeiro, Brazil

14 April 2000	Atenas (Argentina)	84–69 (Series: 2–1)	(Brazil) Vasco da Gama	Córdoba, Argentina
				Arena: Polideportivo Municipal Carlos Cerutti

15 April 2000	Atenas (Argentina)	75–87 (Series: 2–2)	(Brazil) Vasco da Gama	Córdoba, Argentina
				Arena: Polideportivo Municipal Carlos Cerutti

17 April 2000	Vasco da Gama (Brazil)	64–61 (Series: 3–2)	(Argentina) Atenas	Rio de Janeiro, Brazil

== Finals rosters ==
Vasco da Gama: Charles Byrd, Demétrius Conrado Ferraciú, Rogério Klafke, Sandro Varejão, Jose Vargas - Helinho. Coach: Hélio Rubens

Atenas Cordoba: Marcelo Milanesio, Leandro Palladino, Héctor Campana, Jason Osborne - Leonardo Gutierrez. Coach: Pablo Coleffi

== Season MVP ==
- (Dominican Republic) Jose Vargas
