= 1999 Liga Sudamericana de Básquetbol =

Liga Sudamericana de Básquetbol
- Season: 1999
- Dates: 9 February – 30 March 1999
- Teams: 13

Finals
- Champions: (Brazil) Vasco da Gama
- Runners-up: (Argentina) Boca Juniors
- Semifinalists: (Argentina) Independiente de General Pico (Uruguay) Welcome

The 1999 Liga Sudamericana de Básquetbol, or 1999 FIBA South American League, was the fourth edition of the second-tier tournament for professional basketball clubs from South America. The tournament began on 9 February 1999 and finished on 30 March 1999. Brazilian team Vasco da Gama won the tournament, defeating Argentine club Boca Juniors in the Grand Finals, and qualified to the 1999 McDonald's Championship.

== Format ==
Teams were split into one group of four teams and three teams of three teams each, and played each other in a round-robin format. The top two teams from each group advanced to the final stage, a best-of-three direct playoff elimination where the champion was decided. Unlike the previous tournaments where teams played home and away matches in the group phase, every group played all their matches in the same city.

== Teams ==
Country	Team
Argentina	Atenas
Argentina	Boca Juniors
Argentina	Independiente de General Pico
Bolivia	Andino
Brazil	Franca
Brazil	COC/Ribeirão Preto
Brazil	Vasco da Gama
Chile	Llanquihue
Colombia	Cañoneros de Cúcuta
Uruguay	Cordón
Uruguay	Welcome
Venezuela	Guaiqueríes de Margarita
Venezuela	Trotamundos de Carabobo

== Group stage ==
=== Group A ===
All games in group A were played in Cochabamba, Bolivia.

Pos	Team	Pld	W	L	Pts	Qualification
1	(Argentina) Boca Juniors	3	3	0	6	Advances to final stage
2	(Uruguay) Welcome	3	2	1	5	Advances to final stage
3	(Bolivia) Andino	3	1	2	4	
4	(Chile) Llanquihue	3	0	3	3	

Source: FIBA Archive

9 February 1999	Llanquihue (Chile)	71–107	(Argentina) Boca Juniors	Cochabamba, Bolivia

9 February 1999	Andino (Bolivia)	78–118	(Uruguay) Welcome	Cochabamba, Bolivia

10 February 1999	Llanquihue (Chile)	91–95	(Uruguay) Welcome	Cochabamba, Bolivia

10 February 1999	Andino (Bolivia)	62–106	(Argentina) Boca Juniors	Cochabamba, Bolivia

11 February 1999	Andino (Bolivia)	83–64	(Chile) Llanquihue	Cochabamba, Bolivia

11 February 1999	Boca Juniors (Argentina)	86–83	(Uruguay) Welcome	Cochabamba, Bolivia

=== Group B ===
All games in group B were played in Valencia, Venezuela.

Pos	Team	Pld	W	L	Pts	Qualification
1	(Venezuela) Trotamundos de Carabobo	2	1	1	3	Advances to final stage
2	(Brazil) COC/Ribeirão Preto	2	1	1	3	Advances to final stage
3	(Uruguay) Cordón	2	1	1	3	

Source: FIBA Archive

9 February 1999	Trotamundos de Carabobo (Venezuela)	78–68	(Uruguay) Cordón	Valencia, Venezuela

10 February 1999	Cordón (Uruguay)	57–52	(Brazil) COC/Ribeirão Preto	Valencia, Venezuela

11 February 1999	Trotamundos de Carabobo (Venezuela)	51–57	(Brazil) COC/Ribeirão Preto	Cochabamba, Bolivia

=== Group C ===
All games in group C were played in Rio de Janeiro, Brazil.

Pos	Team	Pld	W	L	Pts	Qualification
1	(Brazil) Vasco da Gama	2	1	1	3	Advances to final stage
2	(Argentina) Atenas	2	1	1	3	Advances to final stage
3	(Venezuela) Guaiqueríes de Margarita	2	1	1	3	

Source: FIBA Archive

9 February 1999	Vasco da Gama (Brazil)	105–82	(Venezuela) Guaiqueríes de Margarita	Rio de Janeiro, Brazil

10 February 1999	Guaiqueríes de Margarita (Venezuela)	73–70	(Argentina) Atenas	Rio de Janeiro, Brazil

11 February 1999	Vasco da Gama (Brazil)	60–62	(Argentina) Atenas	Rio de Janeiro, Brazil
	Pts: Rogério 12		Pts: Campana 19

=== Group D ===
All games in group D were played in Cúcuta, Colombia.

Pos	Team	Pld	W	L	Pts	Qualification
1	(Argentina) Independiente de General Pico	2	1	1	3	Advances to final stage
2	(Colombia) Cañoneros de Cúcuta	2	1	1	3	Advances to final stage
3	(Brazil) Franca	2	1	1	3	

Source: FIBA Archive

9 February 1999	Cañoneros de Cúcuta (Colombia)	101–104	(Argentina) Independiente de General Pico	Cúcuta, Colombia

10 February 1999	Independiente de General Pico (Argentina)	92–93	(Brazil) Franca	Cúcuta, Colombia

11 February 1999	Cañoneros de Cúcuta (Colombia)	90–86	(Argentina) Franca	Cúcuta, Colombia

== Final stage ==
Quarterfinals
(Brazil) Vasco da Gama	2
(Colombia) Cañoneros de Cúcuta	0
(Venezuela) Trotamundos de Carabobo	1
(Uruguay) Welcome	2
(Argentina) Boca Juniors	2
(Brazil) COC/Ribeirão Preto	0
(Argentina) Independiente de General Pico	2
(Argentina) Atenas	1

Semifinals
(Brazil) Vasco da Gama	2
(Uruguay) Welcome	0
(Argentina) Boca Juniors	2
(Argentina) Independiente de General Pico	1

Finals
(Brazil) Vasco da Gama	2
(Argentina) Boca Juniors	0

=== Quarterfinals ===
==== Game 1 ====
23 February 1999	Atenas (Argentina)	69–88 (Series: 0–1)	(Argentina) Independiente de General Pico	Córdoba, Argentina

23 February 1999	Cañoneros de Cúcuta (Colombia)	70–87 (Series: 0–1)	(Brazil) Vasco da Gama	Cúcuta, Colombia

25 February 1999	COC/Ribeirão Preto (Brazil)	78–93 (Series: 0–1)	(Argentina) Boca Juniors	Ribeirão Preto, Brazil
	Pts: Merritt 19		Pts: Montecchia 27

25 February 1999	Welcome (Uruguay)	88–58 (Series: 1–0)	(Venezuela) Trotamundos de Carabobo	Montevideo, Uruguay

==== Game 2 ====
1 March 1999	Trotamundos de Carabobo (Venezuela)	75–73 (Series: 1–1)	(Uruguay) Welcome	Valencia, Venezuela

2 March 1999	Independiente de General Pico (Argentina)	70–72 (Series: 1–1)	(Argentina) Atenas	General Pico, Argentina

2 March 1999	Vasco da Gama (Brazil)	104–86 (Series: 2–0)	(Colombia) Cañoneros de Cúcuta	Rio de Janeiro, Brazil

4 March 1999	Boca Juniors (Argentina)	93–83 (Series: 2–0)	(Brazil) COC/Ribeirão Preto	Buenos Aires, Argentina
	Pts: de la Fuente 25		Pts: Wagnao 20	Arena: Estadio Luis Conde

==== Game 3 ====
2 March 1999	Trotamundos de Carabobo (Venezuela)	78–86 (Series: 1–2)	(Uruguay) Welcome	Valencia, Venezuela

3 March 1999	Independiente de General Pico (Argentina)	77–71 (Series: 2–1)	(Argentina) Atenas	General Pico, Argentina

=== Semifinals ===
==== Game 1 ====
9 March 1999	Welcome (Uruguay)	75–95 (Series: 0–1)	(Brazil) Vasco da Gama	Montevideo, Uruguay

11 March 1999	Independiente de General Pico (Argentina)	63–71 (Series: 0–1)	(Argentina) Boca Juniors	General Pico, Argentina

==== Game 2 ====
16 March 1999	Vasco da Gama (Brazil)	90–75 (Series: 0–1)	(Uruguay) Welcome	Rio de Janeiro, Brazil

16 March 1999	Boca Juniors (Argentina)	80–88 (Series: 1–1)	(Argentina) Independiente de General Pico	Buenos Aires, Argentina
	Pts: Barrett 16		Pts: Prickett 20	Arena: Estadio Luis Conde

==== Game 3 ====
17 March 1999	Boca Juniors (Argentina)	73–77 (Series: 2–1)	(Argentina) Independiente de General Pico	Buenos Aires, Argentina
				Arena: Estadio Luis Conde

=== Grand Finals ===
25 March 1999	Boca Juniors (Argentina)	73–77 (Series: 0–1)	(Brazil) Vasco da Gama	Buenos Aires, Argentina
				Arena: Estadio Luis Conde

25 March 1999	Vasco da Gama (Brazil)	76–68 (Series: 2–0)	(Argentina) Boca Juniors	Rio de Janeiro, Brazil
	Pts: Byrd		Pts: Barrett 26	Arena: Ginásio do Maracanãzinho

== Finals rosters ==
Vasco da Gama: Charles Byrd, Demétrius Conrado Ferraciú, Rogério Klafke, Jose Mingão, Jose Vargas - Janjão. Coach: Flor Meléndez

Boca Juniors: Alejandro Montecchia, Gabriel Fernández, Stacey Williams, Rubén Wolkowyski, Rowan Barrett - Esteban de la Fuente, Daniel Farabello. Coach: Néstor "Che" Garcia

== Season MVP ==
- (United States) Charles Byrd (Note: Charles Byrd is the 2nd topscorer in history of Vasco da Gama.)
