= 1965 Taça Brasil de Basquete =

- League: Taça Brasil de Basquete
- Sport: Basketball
- Duration: November 26, 1965 – November 29, 1965 (Finals)
- Teams: 2
- Top scorer: Otto (Vasco)

Finals
- Champions: Corinthians
- Runners-up: Vasco

Taça Brasil de Basquete seasons
- 1966 →

The 1965 Taça Brasil de Basquete was the 1st edition of the Taça Brasil de Basquete. It crowned Corinthians as the first national champion and representative of Brazil in the 1965 South American Basketball Championship of Champions Clubs.

== Background ==
In the mid 60’s, with the globalization of the basketball game, FIBA decided to organize the first edition of the Intercontinental Cup, to be held in 1966. Consequentely, to decide the South American representative, the South American Club Championship was created. To decide who would represent the country in that competition, the Brazilian Basketball Confederation organized the 1st edition of the Taça Brasil de Basquete, a best-of-three series between the champions of the São Paulo and Guanabara states.

== Series summary ==
Game	Date	Home team	Result	Away team
Game 1	November 26	Vasco	83-79 (1–0)	Corinthians
Game 2	November 28	Corinthians	94-87 (1–1)	Vasco
Game 3	November 29	Corinthians	95-86 (2–1)	Vasco

== Game summaries ==
=== Game 1 ===
November 26
21:30 pm

Box score

Vasco 83, Corinthians 79
Scoring by half: 35–34, 48-45
Pts: Otto 21	Pts: Rosa Branca 22
Vasco leads series, 1–0

Ginásio Alah Batista, Rio de Janeiro
Referees: Isaac Griman, Manuel Tavares

Initially scheduled to be played at the Ginásio do Maracanãzinho, the game was moved to the much smaller Ginásio Alah Batista due to conflicts with volleyball games previously scheduled by the CBV. Corinthians declined the proposal by the Brazilian Basketball Confederation to host the first game, sticking to the initial draw that defined the 2nd and 3rd games would be played in São Paulo.

Corinthians was missing Wlamir and Ubiratan for the game. The first had a knee injury and the second had hepatitis, but ended up coming on in the second half. Vasco had control of the whole game with only the first 10 minutes being truly competitive. Near the end, Corinthians managed to shorten a score from 72-64 to 81-79 with 30 seconds left, but Ubiratan missed two free throws and their reaction was cut short.

=== Game 2 ===
November 28
8:30 am

Box score

Corinthians 94, Vasco 87
Scoring by half: 51–42, 43-45
Pts: Rosa Branca 25	Pts: Otto 33
Series tied, 1–1

Parque São Jorge, São Paulo
Referees: Isaac Griman, Manuel Tavares

Game 2 was delayed by about 30 minutes following a discussion about the match balls. The Vasco directors wanted to play with the same Brazilian made ball used in Game 1 while Corinthians wanted to use their American made ball that would be used in the South American Championship the following month. The hosts eventually gave up and the Brazilian made balls were used.

The hosts had a good start leading 17-4 in the opening five minutes. Vasco were able to cut the deficit to 5 points but the half ended up with Corinthians leading 51-42. The second half started like the first with the lead going up to 59-46, but a reaction by Vasco late in the game that cut the difference to just 4 points (74-70) was not maintained and Corinthians ending up winners and forcing the third and last game. Otto had a series-high 33 points but it was not enough.

=== Game 3 ===
November 29
21:00 pm

Box score

Corinthians 95, Vasco 86
Scoring by half: 50–26, 45-50
Pts: Renê 23	Pts: Douglas 22
Corinthians wins series, 2–1

Ginásio do Ibirapuera, São Paulo
Referees: Isaac Griman, Manuel Tavares

Corinthians had their best game in the series, but still far from their best, and ended up champions. Wlamir, back from his knee injury, Edvar and Renê had a great scoring first half while Rosa Branca and Ubiratan managed the rebounds. Corinthians went to halftime leading 50-36 with Pedro Ives coming in for Edvar and maintaining the high level.

In the second half, the hosts opened up a 59-42 lead in the first 5 minutes and started to rest themselves, letting Vasco to close in. The reaction was cut short and Corinthians opened up 80-60, the biggest margin so far in the game. Home fans cheered for them to break the 100 point mark, making the team allow easy points so they got back possession. This made the final score of 95-86 way shorter than what the game indicated.

== Champions Roster ==
Sport Club Corinthians Paulista

Note: Flags indicate national team eligibility at FIBA-sanctioned events. Players may hold other non-FIBA nationalities not displayed.

Sport Club Corinthians Paulista – 1965 Taça Brasil de Basquete roster
Players
Coaches

Pos.	No.	Nat.	Name	Ht.	Age
		(Brazil)	Gilberto
F	4	(Brazil)	Mical, Luiz Carlos
SF	5	(Brazil)	Marques, Wlamir (C)	1.85 m (6 ft 1 in)	89 – 16 July 1937
C	6	(Brazil)	Maciel, Bira	1.99 m (6 ft 6 in)	82 – 18 January 1944
C	7	(Brazil)	Carlos Felippe, Eduardo
F	8	(Brazil)	Cortiz, Osvaldo
F	10	(Brazil)	Salomón, Renê		86 – 30 November 1939
PG	11	(Brazil)	Peninha, Antônio Penna		87 – 4 December 1938
PG	13	(Brazil)	Yves, Pedro		87 – 4 December 1938
F/C	14	(Brazil)	Branca, Rosa	1.89 m (6 ft 2 in)	86 – 16 July 1940
PG	15	(Brazil)	Simões, Edvar	1.85 m (6 ft 1 in)	83 – 23 April 1943

Head coach

- (Brazil) Moacyr Daiuto

Legend

- (C) Team captain
