= 1997 Tournament of the Americas =

Tournament details
- Host country: Uruguay
- City: Montevideo
- Dates: 21–31 August
- Teams: 10
- Venue: 1 (in 1 host city)

Final positions
- Champions: United States (3rd title)
- Runners-up: Puerto Rico
- Third place: Brazil
- Fourth place: Argentina

Tournament statistics
- Top scorer: (Venezuela) Víctor Díaz

The 1997 Tournament of the Americas, later known as the FIBA Americas Championship and the FIBA AmeriCup, was a basketball championship hosted by Uruguay from 21 to 31, August 1997. The games were played in Montevideo. This FIBA AmeriCup was to earn the four berths allocated to the Americas for the 1998 FIBA World Championship in Athens, Greece. The United States won the tournament, the country's third AmeriCup championship.

== Qualification ==
Eight teams qualified during the qualification tournaments held in their respective zones in 1997; two teams (USA and Canada) qualified automatically since they are the only members of the North America zone.

- North America: Canada, United States
- Caribbean and Central America:Cuba, Dominican Republic, Mexico, Puerto Rico
- South America: Argentina, Brazil, Uruguay, Venezuela

The draw split the tournament into two groups:

Group A

Argentina
Brazil
Cuba
Mexico
Uruguay

Group B

Canada
Dominican Republic
Puerto Rico
United States
Venezuela

== Format ==
- The top four teams from each group advance to the quarterfinals.
- Results and standings among teams within the same group are carried over.
- The top four teams at the quarterfinals were granted berths in the 1998 FIBA World Championship. Since the United States were already qualified as Olympic Champions, should they reach one of the top four places in the quarterfinals, the fifth team on the final standings was given the remaining berth.
- The top four teams then played an extra match to define the first six places in the final standings (1 vs. 2 for first place, 3 vs. 4 for third place and 5 vs. 6 for fifth place).

== Preliminary round ==
Qualified for the quarterfinals

=== Group A ===
Team	Pld	W	L	PF	PA	PD	Pts	Tie
Argentina	4	3	1	317	284	+33	7	1–0
Brazil	4	3	1	328	297	+31	7	0–1
Cuba	4	2	2	307	290	+17	6	1–0
Uruguay	4	2	2	297	308	−11	6	0–1
Mexico	4	0	4	282	352	−70	4	

21 August

Argentina	81–73	Cuba

Montevideo

21 August

Uruguay	81–67	Mexico

Montevideo

22 August

Argentina	68–65	Brazil

Montevideo

22 August

Cuba	71–68	Mexico

Montevideo

23 August

Cuba	88–63	Uruguay

Montevideo

23 August

Brazil	101–71	Mexico

Montevideo

24 August

Argentina	99–76	Mexico

Montevideo

24 August

Brazil	84–83 (OT)	Uruguay

Montevideo

25 August

Brazil	78–65	Cuba

Montevideo

25 August

Uruguay	70–69	Argentina

Montevideo

=== Group B ===
Team	Pld	W	L	PF	PA	PD	Pts	Tie
Canada	4	3	1	403	362	+41	7	1–1 (0.527)
United States	4	3	1	368	334	+34	7	1–1 (0.524)
Venezuela	4	3	1	365	357	+8	7	1–1 (0.506)
Puerto Rico	4	1	3	330	353	−23	5	
Dominican Republic	4	0	4	320	380	−60	4	

21 August

Venezuela	85–75	United States

Montevideo

21 August

Puerto Rico	88–85	Dominican Republic

Montevideo

22 August

United States	98–70	Dominican Republic

Montevideo

22 August

Canada	78–77	Puerto Rico

Montevideo

23 August

Venezuela	85–80	Dominican Republic

Montevideo

23 August

United States	102–97	Canada

Montevideo

24 August

United States	93–82	Puerto Rico

Montevideo

24 August

Canada	119–98	Venezuela

Montevideo

25 August

Canada	109–85	Dominican Republic

Montevideo

25 August

Venezuela	97–83	Puerto Rico

Montevideo

== Quarterfinal group ==
Qualified for the semifinals

The top four teams in both Group A and Group B advanced to the quarterfinal group. Then each team played the four from the other group once to complete a full round robin. Records from the preliminary groups carried over. The top two teams advanced to the first place game and the third and fourth-place teams advanced to the third place game. The fifth-place team (Cuba) and the sixth-place team (Canada) did not continue competing for the Americas Championship, but played a further game against each other, with the winner qualifying for the 1998 FIBA World Championship.

Team	Pld	W	L	PF	PA	PD	Pts	Tie
United States	8	7	1	750	673	+77	15	
Puerto Rico	8	5	3	722	679	+43	13	1−0
Brazil	8	5	3	680	637	+43	13	0−1
Argentina	8	4	4	650	626	+24	12	2−1 (0.509)
Cuba	8	4	4	666	681	−15	12	2−1 (0.494)
Canada	8	4	4	699	687	+12	12	1−2 (0.504)
Venezuela	8	4	4	708	716	−8	12	1−2 (0.497)
Uruguay	8	3	5	602	648	−46	11	

27 August

United States	100–88	Cuba

Montevideo

27 August

Puerto Rico	88–83	Argentina

Montevideo

27 August

Brazil	88–79	Venezuela

Montevideo

27 August

Canada	63–56	Uruguay

Montevideo

28 August

Venezuela	87–85	Argentina

Montevideo

28 August

Cuba	88–75	Canada

Montevideo

28 August

Puerto Rico	86–81	Brazil

Montevideo

28 August

United States	98–84	Uruguay

Montevideo

29 August

Puerto Rico	116–81	Cuba

Montevideo

29 August

United States	91–78	Argentina

Montevideo

29 August

Uruguay	84–77	Venezuela

Montevideo

29 August

Brazil	94–82	Canada

Montevideo

30 August

Cuba	102–100	Venezuela

Montevideo

30 August

Argentina	87–76	Canada

Montevideo

30 August

United States	93–89	Brazil

Montevideo

30 August

Puerto Rico	102–81	Uruguay

Montevideo

== Final round ==
=== Fifth place game ===
31 August

Canada	92–83	Cuba

Montevideo

=== Third place game ===
31 August

Brazil	76–75	Argentina

Montevideo

=== First place game ===
31 August

United States	95–86	Puerto Rico

Montevideo

== Awards ==
=== Topscorer ===
Víctor Díaz was the topscorer with 195 pts (24.4 pts per game).

1997 Tournament of the Americas winners

United States
Third title

== Final standings ==
Qualified for the 1998 FIBA World Championship
Qualified for the 1998 FIBA World Championship (Olympic Champions)

Rank	Team	Record
1st place, gold medalist(s)	United States	8–1
2nd place, silver medalist(s)	Puerto Rico	5–4
3rd place, bronze medalist(s)	Brazil	6–3
4	Argentina	4–5
5	Canada	5–4
6	Cuba	4–5
7	Venezuela	4–4
8	Uruguay	3–5
9	Dominican Republic	0–4
10	Mexico	0–4

1st	2nd	3rd
United States Rusty LaRue; Corey Beck; Jim Farmer; Jason Sasser; Erik Martin; Adrian Griffin; Reggie Jordan; Kermit Holmes; Evers Burns; Russ Millard; Travis Williams; Michael McDonald	Puerto Rico José Ortiz; Eddie Casiano; Orlando Santiago; Erick River; Jerome Mincy; James Carter; Carlos Lanauze; Ramón Rivas; Rolando Hourruitiner; Édgar de León; Luis Allende; Daniel Santiago	Brazil Raúl Filho; André Guimarães; Caio de Mello; Carlos Rodrigues do Nascimento; Aristides dos Santos; Demétrius Ferraciú; Alexei Carvalho; Cláudio Gomes; Sandro Varejão; Vanderlei Mazzuchini; Rogério Klafke; Joélcio Joerke

== Sources ==
- 1997 edition USA - flippingbook.com
