= Sandro Varejão =

Brazilian basketball player

Personal information
- Born: April 9, 1972 (age 54) Vitória, Espírito Santo
- Listed height: 2.10 m (6 ft 11 in)
- Listed weight: 111 kg (245 lb)

Career information
- College: Southern Idaho (1993–1995); West Virginia (1995–1997)
- NBA draft: 1997: undrafted
- Playing career: 1998–2007
- Position: Center

Career history
- 1998: Grêmio Londrina
- 1998–1999: Franca
- 1999–2002: Vasco da Gama
- 2002–2003: Universo/Ajax
- 2003: Brasília
- 2004: Universo/Ajax
- 2004–2006: Telemar Rio de Janeiro
- 2006–2007: Saldanha da Gama

Career highlights
- 4× Brazilian league winner (1999–2001, 2005); 2× Campeonato Carioca winner (2000, 2001); Liga Sudamericana champion (2000); Brazilian league All-Star (1999)
Medals
Men's basketball
Representing Brazil
Pan American Games
Gold medal – first place	1999 Winnipeg
FIBA AmeriCup
Bronze medal – third place	1997 Montevideo
Silver medal – second place	2001 Neuquén
FIBA South American Championship
Gold medal – first place	1999 Bahía Blanca
Silver medal – second place	2001 Valdivia
Goodwill Games
Bronze medal – third place	2001 Brisbane

Sandro França Varejão (born April 9, 1972) is a Brazilian former professional basketball player. A 6-foot-11-inch (2.11 m) center, he is the older brother of Anderson Varejão and played college basketball in the United States from 1993 to 1997, initially with Southern Idaho in the NJCAA and then with West Virginia in the NCAA Division I. After going undrafted in the 1997 NBA draft, Varejão started his professional career in Brazil, where he won several titles, among them four national championships and a Liga Sudamericana. Varejão is a six-time medalist with the Brazilian national team and participated in two FIBA World Championships in 1998 and 2002.

== College career ==
Born in Vitória, in the Espírito Santo state of Brazil, Varejão played basketball in high school at Colégio Salesiano Nossa Senhora da Vitória, where he also played volleyball: Varejão won a volleyball national title during his last year of high school. In 1991, he moved to the United States, and joined the College of Southern Idaho Golden Eagles, playing in the NJCAA. In his first season with the team, Varejão averaged 8.3 points, 5.1 rebounds and 1.4 blocks per game, and was named in the All-Region 18 Second Team. As a sophomore, he improved his averages to 17.8 points and 11 rebounds, and after the 1994–95 season, Varejão decided to transfer to West Virginia, in the NCAA Division I.

In his first year with the Mountaineers, Varejão wore jersey number 40. He started all of his 27 games, averaging 6.5 points and 3.7 rebounds and 0.03 blocks in 23 minutes per game. Varejão recorded a career-high 18 points (and added 10 rebounds) against Ohio on December 16, 1995. He was seventh in the team in scoring and third in rebounding. As a senior, Varejão started 17 of 29 games, averaging 6.1 points, 4.7 rebounds and 0.3 blocks in 20.2 minutes per game; he recorded a season-high 14 points against Providence on February 8, 1997. At the end of the season, Varejão ranked seventh on the team in scoring and third in rebounding (behind Gordon Malone and Damian Owens). He ended his career at West Virginia with totals of 353 points and 234 rebounds.

=== College statistics ===
Year	Team	GP	GS	MPG	FG%	3P%	FT%	RPG	APG	SPG	BPG	PPG
1995–96	West Virginia	27	27	23.0	.511	.000	.493	3.7	0.6	0.5	0.3	6.5
1996–97	West Virginia	29	17	20.2	.514	.000	.545	4.7	0.8	0.5	0.3	6.1
Career		56	44	21.6	.513	.000	.515	4.2	0.7	0.5	0.3	6.3

== Professional career ==
After his senior year in college, Varejão was automatically eligible for the NBA draft. However, he was not selected by an NBA franchise during the 1997 draft. Varejão then moved back to Brazil and started a professional career. In 1998, Varejão joined Franca, and was selected as an All-Star in 1999 and played the All-Star Game in Mogi das Cruzes in March 1999. For the 1999 season, Varejão averaged 16.6 points, 6.4 rebounds, and 0.7 assists over 37 games while shooting 62.3% from the field. In the final game of the title series of the 1999 Brazilian Championship against Vasco da Gama, he had 14 points and two rebounds in 31 minutes of play, winning the game and the national title.

Varejão then joined Vasco da Gama for the 1999 McDonald's Championship, reaching the tournament finals where they lost to the San Antonio Spurs. He was then part of the Vasco team that won the Campeonato Carioca, the Brazilian league and the Liga Sudamericana in 2000. In 2001, Varejão won the Brazilian league (his third consecutive title) and the Carioca league with Vasco. He then played the 2002–03 season with Universo/Ajax, a team based in Goiânia, reaching the league semifinals where they were eliminated by Unitri/Uberlândia. Varejão then played for Brasília in 2003 before going back to Universo/Ajax the following year. In 2004, Universo/Ajax again reached the league semifinals, but they were eliminated by Flamengo.

In 2004, Varejão joined Telemar Rio de Janeiro, and he won the national league title (his fourth personal) the following year, beating Unitri/Uberlândia in the finals. Varejão then played the 2006–07 season with Saldanha da Gama.

== National team career ==
Varejão was first called up to the Brazilian national team in 1997, and in the 1997 Tournament of the Americas, he won the bronze medal.

In 1998, Varejão participated in the 1998 FIBA World Championship, averaging 2.9 points and 2.9 rebounds per game over seven appearances.

In 1999, Varejão won two gold medals, one in the FIBA South American Championship, and one in the Pan American Games.

In 2001, Varejão took part in the South American Championship, winning the silver medal, and in the 2001 Tournament of the Americas, where he also won silver. Varejão won the bronze at the 2001 Goodwill Games, his third medal of the year.

In 2002, Varejão played in the 2002 FIBA World Championship, averaging 7.3 points and 4.8 rebounds in nine games.
