= CR Vasco da Gama (basketball) =

Vasco Basquete
- Nickname: Cruzmaltino (from maltese cross); Gigante da Colina (Giant of the Hill); Camisas Negras (Black Shirts)
- Leagues: NBB
- Founded: 1898; 127 years ago (sports club); 1920; 105 years ago (basketball)
- History: C.R. Vasco da Gama (1920–present)
- Arena: Ginásio Vasco da Gama
- Capacity: 1,000
- Location: Rio de Janeiro, RJ, Brazil
- Team colors: Black and white
- President: Pedrinho
- Championships: 2 FIBA South American Leagues; 2 South American Club Championships; 2 CBB Championships; 1 Liga Ouro
- Website: www.vasco.com.br
Home	Away

The Vasco Basquete or simply Vasco, and R10 Score Vasco for sponsorship reasons, is the men's professional basketball team part of the Brazilian multi-sports club C.R. Vasco da Gama, that is based in Rio de Janeiro. Founded on 11 May 1920, currently competes in the Novo Basquete Brasil (NBB).

== History ==
Vasco da Gama won the CBB Championship title in the years 2000 and 2001, and the FIBA South American League championship in the years 1999 and 2000. They also won the South American Club Championship in the years 1998 and 1999.

The club also played at the 1999 McDonald's Championship, losing the final to San Antonio Spurs. The club is the first Brazilian club to play against an NBA team.

In 2016, the club won the Liga Ouro, the competition that gives its champion a place in the next edition of the Brazilian premier professional basketball league, the NBB. The club then competed in Brazil's top-tier level, for the first time since 2003, as it competed in the 2016–17 NBB season.

== Honours ==
=== Worldwide ===
- Quadrangular Quarta Copa Mundial
  - Champions (1): 1963
- McDonald's Championship
  - Runners-up (1): 1999

=== Latin America ===
- Pan American Club Championship
  - Runners-up (1): 1999

=== Continental ===
- South American Club Championship
  - Champions (2): 1998, 1999
  - Runners-up (1): 2000
- FIBA South American League (LSB)
  - Champions (2): 1999, 2000
  - Runners-up (1): 2002

=== National ===
- CBB Championship
  - Champions (2): 2000, 2001
  - Runners-up (4): 1965, 1966, 1980, 1999
- Brazilian Champions Cup
  - Winners (1): 1981
- Liga Ouro
  - Champions (1): 2016

=== Regional ===
- Rio de Janeiro State Championship
  - Champions (16): 1946, 1963, 1965, 1969, 1976, 1978, 1979, 1980, 1981, 1983, 1987, 1989, 1992, 1997, 2000, 2001
  - Runners-up (18): 1940, 1943, 1947, 1957, 1964, 1966, 1967, 1968, 1971, 1972, 1974, 1975, 1977, 1984, 1990, 1998, 2007, 2016

== Roster ==
Note: Flags indicate national team eligibility at FIBA-sanctioned events. Players may hold other non-FIBA nationalities not displayed.

Vasco da Gama Basketball roster
Players
Coaches

Pos.	No.	Nat.	Name	Ht.	Wt.	Age
PG	4	(Brazil)	Vernizzi, Alexsander	1.85 m (6 ft 1 in)	83 kg (183 lb)	25 – 17 April 2000
SG	10	(Brazil)	Basilio, Gustavo	1.93 m (6 ft 4 in)	85 kg (187 lb)	33 – 13 November 1991
PG	11	(Brazil)	Nunes, Pedro	1.85 m (6 ft 1 in)	87 kg (192 lb)	25 – 23 August 2000
F	19	(Brazil)	Magna, Guilherme	2.01 m (6 ft 7 in)	104 kg (229 lb)	27 – 29 May 1998
PF/C	23	(Brazil)	Honorato, Italo	2.08 m (6 ft 10 in)	107 kg (236 lb)	24 – 13 September 2001

Head coach

- (Brazil) Léo Figueiró

Assistant coach(es)

- (Brazil) Christiano Medeiros
- (Brazil) Cássio de Lima dos Santos

Legend

- (C) Team captain
- Injured

- Roster
Updated: 3 July 2019

== Notable players ==
- (Brazil) Alexey
- (Brazil) Fúlvio de Assis
- (Brazil) Aylton
- (Brazil) Byra Bello
- (Brazil) Edson Bispo
- (Brazil) Waldyr Boccardo
- (Brazil) Alfredo da Motta
- (Brazil) Demétrius
- (Brazil) Josuel dos Santos
- (Brazil) Nezinho dos Santos
- (Brazil) Roberto Felinto
- (Brazil) Fernando Freitas
- (Brazil) Gaúcho
- (Brazil) Guilherme Giovannoni
- (Brazil) Helinho
- (Brazil) Janjão
- (Brazil) Duda Machado
- (Brazil) Manteiguinha
- (Brazil) Mingão
- (Brazil) Paulinho Motta
- (Brazil) Nenê
- (Brazil) Ratto
- (Brazil) Rogério
- (Brazil) Caio Torres
- (Brazil) Valtinho
- (Brazil) Sandro Varejão
- (Brazil) Marquinhos Vieira
- (Argentina) Dani Farabello
- (Dominican Republic) Muñoz
- (Dominican Republic) Evaristo Pérez
- (Dominican Republic) José Vargas
- (United States) Charles Byrd

== See also ==
- CR Vasco da Gama
- CR Vasco da Gama (women)
- CR Vasco da Gama (beach soccer)
