= Oscar Schmidt =

Brazilian basketball player (1958–2026)

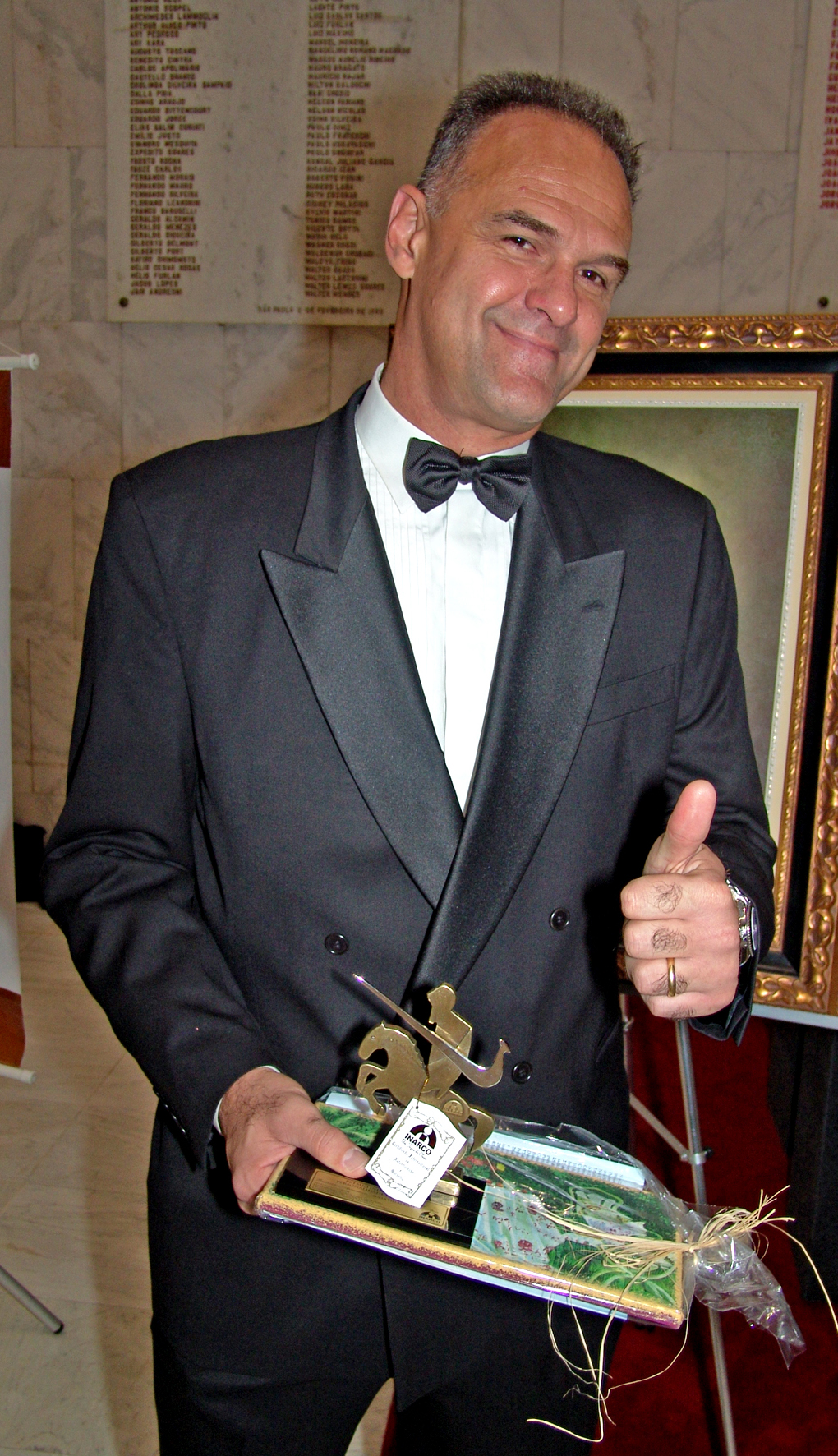
- Schmidt in 2006

Personal information
- Born: February 16, 1958 Natal, Rio Grande do Norte, Brazil
- Died: April 17, 2026 (aged 68) Santana de Parnaíba, São Paulo, Brazil
- Listed height: 206 cm (6 ft 9 in)
- Listed weight: 109 kg (240 lb)

Career information
- NBA draft: 1984: 6th round, 131st overall pick
- Drafted by: New Jersey Nets
- Playing career: 1974–2003
- Positions: Small forward, power forward
- Number: 6, 11, 14, 18

Career history
- 1974–1978: S.E. Palmeiras
- 1978–1982: E.C. Sírio
- 1982: América do Rio
- 1982–1990: JuveCaserta
- 1990–1993: Pavia
- 1993–1995: Valladolid
- 1995–1997: S.C. Corinthians Paulista
- 1997–1999: Bandeirantes / Mackenzie
- 1999–2003: C.R. Flamengo

Career highlights
- FIBA Intercontinental Cup champion (1979); FIBA Intercontinental Cup Finals Top Scorer (1979); FIBA's 50 Greatest Players (1991); FIBA European Selection (1991); 3× ULEB All-Star (1992–1994); ULEB All-Star Game 3-Point Contest Champion (1994); Spanish League Top Scorer (1994); 7× Italian League Top Scorer (1984–1987, 1989, 1990, 1992); Italian Cup winner (1988); 9× Italian League All-Star (1983–1991); Italian League All-Star Game MVP (1987); 3× Italian League All-Star Game 3-Point Contest Champion (1987–1989); 2× Italian 2nd Division Top Scorer (1991, 1993); South American Club Championship champion (1979); 3× Brazilian Championship champion (1977, 1979, 1996); 10× Brazilian Championship Top Scorer (1979, 1980, 1996–2003); Olympic Order (1997); No. 18 retired by JuveCaserta (1990); No. 11 retired by Pavia (1993); No. 14 retired by Flamengo (2003); Italian Basketball Hall of Fame (2017); Spanish Basketball Hall of Fame (2022)
- Stats at Basketball Reference
- Basketball Hall of Fame
- FIBA Hall of Fame
Medals
Men's basketball
Representing Brazil
FIBA World Cup
Bronze medal – third place	1978 Manila
FIBA AmeriCup
Gold medal – first place	1984 Brazil
Gold medal – first place	1988 Uruguay
Bronze medal – third place	1989 Mexico
Bronze medal – third place	1995 Argentina
Pan American Games
Gold medal – first place	1987 Indianapolis
Bronze medal – third place	1979 San Juan
FIBA South American Championship
Gold medal – first place	1977 Chile
Gold medal – first place	1983 Brazil
Gold medal – first place	1985 Colombia
Silver medal – second place	1979 Argentina
Silver medal – second place	1981 Uruguay

Oscar Daniel Bezerra Schmidt (February 16, 1958 – April 17, 2026), nicknamed Mão Santa (Holy Hand), was a Brazilian professional basketball player. Schmidt primarily played the power forward and small forward position, was 2.06 m (6 ft 9 in) tall and weighed 109 kg (240 lbs). Along with his home country, Schmidt also played in Italy for JuveCaserta and Pavia, and Spain for Fórum Valladolid. He was born in Natal, Rio Grande do Norte, Brazil.

Schmidt held the record for all-time leading scorer in the history of basketball until 2024, with 49,973 career points scored (pro club league play, plus senior Brazilian national team play). He is the record holder for the longest career span of a professional basketball player at 29 years. He is also the top scorer in the history of the Summer Olympic Games, and the top scorer in the history of the FIBA World Cup.

He was named one of FIBA's 50 Greatest Players in 1991. He received the Olympic Order in 1997. On August 20, 2010, Schmidt became a FIBA Hall of Fame player, in recognition of his play in international competitions. On September 8, 2013, Schmidt was inducted into the Naismith Memorial Basketball Hall of Fame. He was inducted into the Italian Basketball Hall of Fame in 2017.

== Youth club career ==
Schmidt played youth club basketball in the youth systems of S.E. Palmeiras and Mackenzie College. With Palmeiras's youth teams, he scored 2,114 points in 85 games, for a scoring average of 24.9 points per game. With Mackenzie's youth teams, he scored 1,332 points in 36 games, for a scoring average of 37.0 points per game.

== Professional career ==
=== Brazil ===
Schmidt began his professional club career in 1974, at the age of 16, with the Brazilian Championship club S.E. Palmeiras. As a member of Palmeiras, he won the São Paulo State Championship in 1974, and the Brazilian Championship in 1977.

In 1978, he moved to the Brazilian club E.C. Sírio under coach Cláudio Mortari who signed him. As a member of Sírio, Schmidt won the São Paulo State Championship in both 1978 and 1979, and the Brazilian Championship in 1979. He scored 40 points in the 1979 final (held in January 1980) and help Sirio win the title against Francana. With Sírio, he also won the South American Club Championship, and the FIBA Intercontinental Cup title in 1979. He scored 42 points in the 1979 FIBA Intercontinental Cup's Final against the Yugoslav First Federal League club Bosna Sarajevo. Schmidt was the top scorer of the Brazilian Championship in both 1979 and 1980.

In 1982, Schmidt joined the Brazilian club América do Rio. However, he only stayed with the club for a brief amount of time.

=== JuveCaserta ===
For the 1982–83 season, Schmidt joined the Italian 2nd Division club JuveCaserta. With JuveCaserta, he played in the first division level Italian League, for the first time in the 1983–84 season being the leading scorer of the Serie A with 955 points in 34 games. That same season, Schmidt played in a Pan-European club competition for the first time, as he also played in Europe's third-tier level FIBA Korać Cup's 1983–84 season. Schmidt played in Europe's 2nd-tier level competition, the FIBA European Cup Winners' Cup (later renamed to FIBA Saporta Cup), for the first time, in the 1984–85 season.

With JuveCaserta, he won the Italian Cup title in 1988. In the European-wide secondary level 1988–89 FIBA European Cup Winners' Cup's Final, Schmidt scored 44 points against the Spanish club Real Madrid. However, Real Madrid's star player Dražen Petrović, scored 62 points in the same game, and JuveCaserta lost the game, by a score of 117–113.

Schmidt led the Italian top division in scoring six times, while he was a member of JuveCaserta (1983–84, 1984–85, 1985-86, 1986–87, 1988–89, and 1989–90 seasons). JuveCaserta eventually retired Schmidt's #18 jersey.

=== Pavia ===
In 1990, Schmidt joined the Italian 2nd Division club Pavia. With Pavia, Schmidt led the Italian 2nd Division in scoring, in both the 1990–91 and 1992–93 seasons. With Pavia, he also led the first division Italian League in scoring, during the 1991–92 season scoring 1760 pts in 40 games (44.0 average). He was also a member of the FIBA European Selection in 1991.

As a member of Pavia, Schmidt also had his highest scoring single game in the top division Italian League, as he scored 66 points in a 1991–92 season game versus Auxilium Torino, on 30 November 1991. Pavia eventually retired his #11 jersey.

While playing club basketball in Italy, Schmidt earned a fan in future NBA star Kobe Bryant. At that time, Bryant was a young child that was living in Italy, while his father, Joe Bryant, played professional basketball in the country. Bryant called Schmidt one of his childhood idols, and also stated that Schmidt could have been one of the greatest players in the NBA, if he had played in the league.

Overall during his club career in Italy, Schmidt was the Top Scorer of the Italian First Division seven times (1983–84, 1984–85, 1985–86, 1986–87, 1988–89, 1989–90, and 1991–92 seasons). In 2017, Schmidt was inducted into the Italian Basketball Hall of Fame.

=== Valladolid ===
In 1993, Schmidt joined the Spanish ACB League club Valladolid. With Valladolid, Schmidt was the Spanish league's top scorer in the 1993–94 season, with a scoring average of 33.3 points per game, in 33 games played (regular season and playoffs). On 19 March 1994, Schmidt made 11 3-point field goals, in a Spanish League game against Murcia.

Schmidt also spent the 1994–95 season with Valladolid. In that season, he averaged 24.0 points per game, in 38 games played. His single-game scoring high in the Spanish League, was in a game that season versus Málaga, in which he scored 47 points, and made all 8 of his 3-point field goal attempts.

In two seasons in the Spanish ACB, Schmidt scored a total of 2,009 points in 71 games played (regular season and playoffs), for a scoring average of 28.3 points per game.

=== Return to Brazil ===
==== Corinthians and Bandeirantes ====
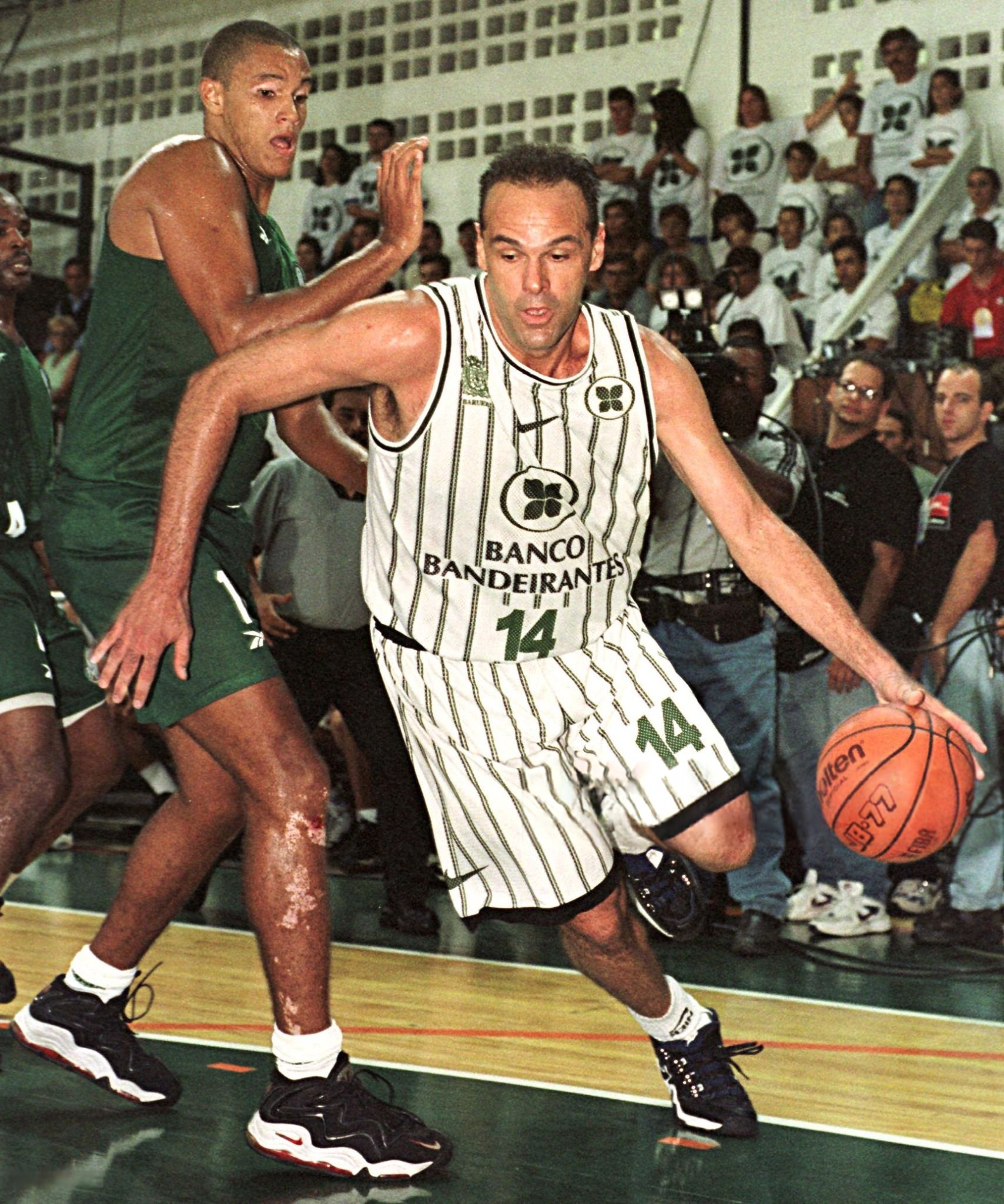
Schmidt playing for Palmeiras

Schmidt returned to his native Brazil in September 1995, after 13 years in Europe, to once again play in the Brazilian Basketball Championship. His debut came on 12 September 1995 in the São Paulo State Championship scoring 47 points for S.C. Corinthians Paulista against Bozzano/Jales. He was a member of S.C. Corinthians Paulista, from 1995 to 1997. He then signed for Grêmio Barueri Bandeirantes / Mackenzie under coach Marcel de Souza a former teammate in the national team. He played there, from 1997 to 1999, and he consequently finished his club career with C.R. Flamengo, where he played from 1999 to 2003.

With Corinthians Paulista, he won the Brazilian Championship in 1996. He was the second scorer in the 1996 São Paulo State Championship averaging 32.2 points and the topscorer in 1997 with 41.9 points per game. During the 1997 National championship he would surpass the mark of 40,000 career points after scoring 41 in a game against Barueri/Bandeirantes.

As a member of Grêmio Barueri Bandeirantes, he won the São Paulo State Championship in 1998, averaging 33.3 points. It was the first in the club's history while Oscar became a Paulista champion again, after 19 years (then with Sirio, in 1979). With Grêmio Barueri Bandeirantes, Schmidt, at the age of 39, scored 74 points in a São Paulo State Championship game on 28 November 1997.

==== Flamengo ====
On September 8, 1999 he debuted for Flamengo in a comfortable victory over Municipal and got a standing ovation by the fans. On December 1, 1999, with a free throw, he reached the historic mark of 43,000 career points. On November 30, 2000, he reached 45,000 career points during the Flamengo-Botafogo game (118-107) in the Rio de Janeiro State Championship.

As a member of Flamengo, he won the Rio de Janeiro State Championship in 1999 being the top scorer with 647 pts. He also led Flamengo to the National Finals finishing runners-up, a distinction that the club never had before 1999. Two years later, on April 8, 2001 he came a step closer to become basketball's leading scorer, after he scored 34 pts in the Flamengo-Fluminense match (92-90) for the National league and he reached 46,014 career points.

On October 27, 2001, he scored 44 pts in the Flamengo-Fluminense match (108-106) for the RJ State Championship and he finally surpassed the mark of 46.725 pts scored by Kareem Abdul-Jabbar becoming basketball's all-timescorer. Oscar had announced that he would retire on 16 May 2002, but a week after a controversial match in which COC/Ribeirao Preto coached by Lula Ferreira eliminated Flamengo in the National Championship quarterfinals (84-78) with Oscar being expelled by the referee, he took it back admitting to the press that he would play for one more year. Eventually, at the end of 2002 Schmidt helped Flamengo win the Rio de Janeiro State Championship.

Schmidt was the Brazilian Championship's top scorer in each of his last eight seasons playing in the competition (1996, 1997, 1998, 1999, 2000, 2001, 2002, 2003). That was in addition to the two times that he had previously led the same competition in scoring, in 1979 and 1980.

He retired from his club basketball playing career on May 26, 2003, at the age of 45, opting not to play in the upcoming Rio de Janeiro State Championship. His final game was against COC/Ribeirão on May 21, 2003. Flamengo then eventually retired his #14 jersey. Up to that day he had scored 49,703 points, then a world record though it was not recognised by FIBA officially.

During his club playing career, Oscar scored a total of 42,044 points, in 1,289 games played, for a career scoring average of 32.6 points per game. He also scored a total of 236 points in All-Star Games. However, those totals do not include all of the games that he played in during his pro club career, as the data for some of the national cup games, Pan-European games, and all-star games that he played in Europe are not available.

=== NBA draft rights ===
Schmidt was drafted by the New Jersey Nets in the sixth round of the 1984 NBA draft, and he played with them in their 1984 NBA training camp and preseason. However, he declined the team's offer of a fully guaranteed contract, because it was for considerably less money than he was making playing in Italy, and because he wanted to continue playing for the senior Brazilian national team (until 1989, NBA players were not allowed to play for national teams).

== National team career ==
=== Junior national team ===
Schmidt played in the youth systems of Brazil's national federation program. He played in 15 games with the junior selection of São Paulo, with which he scored 393 points in 15 games, for a scoring average of 26.2 points per game. He also played in 31 games with Brazil's national junior selection, in which he scored a total of 569 points, for a scoring average of 18.4 points per game.

=== Senior national team ===
With the senior Brazil national team, Schmidt played in five Summer Olympics (he was the second player to do so after Teófilo Cruz) and was the top scorer in three of them. However, he never went past the tournament's quarterfinals. In the 1980 Summer Olympics, he played in seven games and scored 169 points, for a 24.1 average.

He again scored 169 points in seven games in the 1984 Summer Olympics. His best Olympic performance was the 1988 Summer Olympics. At that tournament, he scored 338 points, for an average of 42.3 points per game. In 1992, he scored 198 points in eight games, and in 1996, he scored 219 points in 8 games. In 38 career Olympic basketball games, Schmidt scored a record of 1,093 points, for an average of 28.8 points per game.

Schmidt is also the all-time career leader in total points scored in the FIBA World Cup, having scored a total of 843 points in 33 games, for a scoring average of 25.5 points per game. He won the bronze medal and made the All-Tournament Team at the 1978 FIBA World Cup, and he also made the All-Tournament Teams of both the 1986 FIBA World Cup and the 1990 FIBA World Cup, which he also led in scoring, with an average of 34.6 points per game.

He played in the gold-medal match of the 1987 Pan American Games, which was held in Indianapolis. The US national team, which was composed of NCAA Division I college basketball players at those games, featured two All-Americans in David Robinson (Hall of Fame member) and Danny Manning, two NCAA Championship Final Four MVPs, in Pervis Ellison and Keith Smart (Manning would later also win that award), and other future NBA players, such as Rex Chapman, Pooh Richardson, and Willie Anderson. Brazil faced a 68–54 halftime deficit. However, Schmidt finished the game with 46 points, in a 120–115 win for Brazil.

In 1996, at the age of 38, Schmidt retired from playing with the senior Brazilian national team as its all-time leading scorer. While representing Brazil, he scored a total of 7,693 points in 326 games played, for a career scoring average of 23.6 points per game. In 1997, Schmidt was given the Olympic Order award.

== Post-athletic career ==
In 2004, Schmidt started his career in management. He was the CEO of "Telemar Rio de Janeiro", a Brazilian professional basketball team which won the "Campeonato Carioca" (Rio de Janeiro State Championship) in 2004, and the Brazilian Championship in 2005.

In 2006, Schmidt, along with other Brazilian basketball greats such as Paula and Hortência, (another Hall of Fame member), led the NLB: Nossa Liga de Basquete ("our basketball league"), an attempted rival to the Brazilian Basketball Championship. However, the league folded a year later.

== Personal life and death ==
Schmidt married Maria Cristina Victorino in 1981, and had a son and a daughter. He and his son Felipe, then 16 years old, played together in the former's final season in Flamengo, before Felipe became a film director. Oscar Schmidt's brother Tadeu is a journalist, and his nephew, Bruno Oscar Schmidt, an Olympic gold-medalist beach volleyball player.

On May 13, 2013, Schmidt had brain surgery to excise a malignant tumor. At first, nobody knew about it except for his family. The press found out about the disease fifteen days after the surgery, at a dinner celebrating the 50th anniversary of the two-time FIBA World Champion senior men's Brazilian National Team. Schmidt did not appear at the event, as he was recuperating from daily chemotherapy sessions. The disease was later put into remission.

In 2016, Schmidt took part at the opening ceremony of the 2016 Rio Summer Olympics, as one of carriers of the Olympic flag.

Schmidt died on April 17, 2026, at the age of 68. According to press reports, Schmidt was at home when he began to feel unwell. A SAMU ambulance was called, and he was taken to the Santa Ana Municipal Hospital and Maternity (HMSA) in Santana de Parnaíba, where he was admitted. Hours later, his death was confirmed by his press office. He was cremated wearing the jersey of the Brazilian national basketball team.

== Senior club teams ==
- S.E. Palmeiras: Brazilian Basketball Championship: 1974–78
- E.C. Sírio: Brazilian Basketball Championship: 1978–82
- América do Rio: Brazilian Basketball Championship: 1982
- JuveCaserta: Italian Second Division: 1982–83
- JuveCaserta: Italian Basketball League: 1983–90
- Pavia: Italian Second Division: 1990–91
- Pavia: Italian Basketball League: 1991–92
- Pavia: Italian Second Division: 1992–93
- Valladolid: Spanish Basketball League: 1993–95
- S.C. Corinthians Paulista: Brazilian Basketball Championship: 1995–97
- Bandeirantes / Mackenzie: Brazilian Basketball Championship: 1997–99
- C.R. Flamengo: Brazilian Basketball Championship: 1999–2003

== Career statistics ==
★	Won the tournament in that year
	Topscorer of the competition

=== Italian Serie A1 ===
Regular season and play-offs (Note: Starting with the 1974–75 season, stats accumulated in the Italian league's playoffs were also counted.)

Year	Club	PJ	MP	RT	AS	PT	PPG
1983-84	Juve Caserta	34				955	28.0
1984-85	Juve Caserta	38				1,140	30.0
1985-86	Juve Caserta	40				1,226	30.6
1986-87	Juve Caserta	39				1,316	33.7
1987-88	Juve Caserta	?				?	37.3
1988-89	Juve Caserta	?				1283	35.6
1989-90	Juve Caserta	?					33.1 (Note: 1989-90 A1 Italy: 33.1 average in regular season and 30.8 in play-offs.)
1991-92★	Pavia	?				1120	37.7 (Note: 1991-92 A1 Italy: 38.6 average in regular season and 34.9 ppg in play-offs/out.)

=== Italian Serie A2 ===
Regular season and play-offs.

Year	Club	PJ	MP	RT	AS	PT	PPJ
1990-91★	Pavia	40				1761	43.6 (Note: 1990-91 A2: 43.7 points per game in 30 regular season games (1311 pts) and 45.0 points per game in the 10 games of Play-offs/out between A1 and A2 teams (450 pts).)
1992-93	Pavia	?				?	39.2 (Note: 1992-93 A2: 39.3 points per game in regular season games and 40.7 points per game in the games of Play-offs/out between A1 and A2 teams.)

=== ACB League ===
Regular season and play-offs.

Year	Club	PJ	MP	RT	AS	PT	PPJ
1993-94	Forum Valladolid	28				930	33.2
1994-95	Forum Valladolid	38				911	23.9

=== Campeonato Nacional Brazil ===
Year	Club	PJ	MPJ	FG%	3P%	LL%	RT	AS	BR	TO	PPJ
1996★	Corinthians	31	34.3	.588	.485	.881	9.8	.8	.6	.2	30.9
1997	Corinthians	26	37.6	.530	.504	.880	10.5	1.3	.6	.3	38.2
1998	Banco Bandeirantes/Barueri	28	38.6	.541	.440	.903	11.5	1.4	.6	.2	44.8
1999	Mackenzie-Microcamp/Barueri	36	42.2	.573	.464	.913	10.8	1.7	.7	.3	38.2
2000	Flamengo	38	37.9	.543	.389	.862	9.6	1.7	.5	.1	34.9
2001	Flamengo	34	36.9	.483	.457	.899	8.8	1.3	.6	.1	33.0
2002	Flamengo	34	37.1	.516	.403	.908	8.3	1.9	.6	.2	34.8
2003	Flamengo	31	36.3	.495	.451	.924	7.5	2.0	.5	.2	33.1

=== FIBA World Cup and Olympics ===
Year	Tournament	PJ	MPJ	FG%	3P%	LL%	RT	AS	BR	TO	PPJ
1978	FIBA World Cup	9	-	-	-	.688	-	-	-	-	17.7
1980	Olympics	7	29.4	.548	-	.875	6.7	0.4	0.3	.0	24.1
1982	FIBA World Cup	6	-	-	-	.700	-	-	-	-	21.0
1984	Olympics	7	26.7	.524	-	.781	4.7	0.7	1.0	.0	24.1
1986	FIBA World Cup	10	-	-	-	.764	-	-	-	-	28.1
1988	Olympics	8	36.0	.576	.556	.918	7.8	1.6	0.6	.4	42.3
1990	FIBA World Cup	8	-	-	-	.873	-	-	-	-	34.6
1992	Olympics	8	31.8	.324	.378	.889	3.5	0.6	2.1	.0	24.8
1996	Olympics	8	32.9	.475	.381	.953	3,1	1.0	0,5	.0	27.4

=== Games and points ===
Youth

- Palmeiras 85 (2.114 pts) - PPG 24,8
- Mackenzie 36 (1.332 pts) - PPG 37
- Paulista Selection team: 15 (393 pts) - PPG 26,2
- Brasil Youth national team: 31 (569 pts) - PPG 18,3

Professional

- Palmeiras: 82 (2.033 pts) - PPG 24,8
- Sírio: 146 (4.351 pts) - PPG 29,8
- América do Rio: n/a
- Juvecaserta: 284 (9.143 pts)
- Pavia: 119 (4.814 pts)
- Forum Valladolid: 71 (2.009 pts)
- Corinthians: 131 (4.270 pts) - PPG 32,5
- Bandeirantes: 117 (3.570 pts)
- baureri Mackenzie/Microcamp: 120 (4.613 pts) - PPG 38,4
- Flamengo 219 (7.241 pts) - PPG 33.0

Italy and Spain totals

- Italy: 403 (13.957) - PPG 34,6
- Spain: 71 (2.009) - PPG 28,2

Brazil League totals (1996-2003)

- Campeonato: 258 (9.096) - PPG 35,2

Cups totals

- Cups: 117 (3.570) - PPG 30,5

National team

- Brasil national team: 326 (7.693 pts) - PPG 23,5

All-Star Games

- ULEB All-Star Game: 3 (46 pts) - PPG 15,3
- Lega Basket All Star Game: 9 (224 pts) - PPG 24.9

== Honors and awards ==
=== Summer Olympics Records ===
- All-time leading points scorer: 1,093 points
- Most total points scored in a tournament: 338 points
- Highest per game scoring average in a tournament: 42.3 points per game
- Most points scored in a single game: 55 points
- Oldest player to score 40 or more points in a single game: 38 years and 155 days (scored 45 points)
- Tied for most tournament appearances by a men's basketball player: 5 (tied with Teófilo Cruz, Andrew Gaze, Luis Scola, and Juan Carlos Navarro)

=== Individual ===
- Considered basketball's unofficial second all-time leader in points scored:
  - 49,973 career total points scored in 1,626 games played (30.7 points per game):
  - 42,044 career points scored in 1,289 professional club games played (32.6 points per game).
  - 7,693 points scored in 326 Brazilian national team games played (23.6 points per game).
  - 13,957 points scored in the Italian League during his 11 seasons there. During the 1990-91 season he became the first player to score more than 10,000 points in the Italian Championship.
  - 236 points scored in 11 career All-Star Games played where scoring data is available (21.5 points per game). 186 points scored in 7 Italian League All-Star Games played, 46 points scored in 3 ULEB All-Star Games played, and 4 points scored in the NBA All-Star Game (as a celebrity). Schmidt also played in the FIBA All-Star Game in 1991, but no individual points scored total is available for that game.
- Brazilian national team's all-time leading scorer
- FIBA World Cup's all-time leader in points scored:
  - 906 career points scored in 34 games played (26.7 points per game)
- 1978 FIBA World Championship: All-Tournament Team
- 1986 FIBA World Championship: All-Tournament Team
- 1990 FIBA World Championship: All-Tournament Team
- 1990 FIBA World Championship's Top Scorer (34.6 points per game)
- Summer Olympics's all-time leader in points scored:
  - 1,093 career points scored – 28.8 points per game
- 3× Summer Olympics Top Scorer:
  - Seoul 1988 – 42.3 points per game (the record in any edition)
  - Barcelona 1992 – 24.8 points per game
  - Atlanta 1996 – 27.4 points per game
- Most points scored in a game at the Summer Olympics – 55 against Spain, 24 September 1988 (lost 118–110)
- FIBA Intercontinental Cup Finals Top Scorer (1979)
- 9× Italian League All-Star (1983–1991)
- Italian League All-Star Game MVP (1987)
- 3× Italian League All-Star Game 3-Point Contest Champion (1987–1989)
- 7× Italian League Top Scorer: (1984, 1985, 1986, 1987, 1989, 1990, 1992)
- 2× Italian 2nd Division Top Scorer (1991, 1993)
- 3× ULEB All-Star (1992, 1993, 1994)
- ULEB All-Star Game 3-Point Shootout Champion (1993)
- Spanish League Top Scorer: (1994)
- 10× Brazilian Championship Top Scorer: (1979, 1980, 1996, 1997, 1998, 1999, 2000, 2001, 2002, 2003)
- São Paulo State Championship Top Scorer: 1979, 1995, 1997, 1998
- 4x RJ State Championship Top Scorer: 1999, 2000, 2001, 2002
- 3x São Paulo State Championship Player of the Year: (1979, 1995, 1996)
- He scored 66 points in an Italian League game on 30 November 1991
- He scored 57 points in a São Paulo State Championship game on 28 October 1997
- He scored 59 points in a São Paulo State Championship game on 17 November 1997
- He scored 74 points in a São Paulo State Championship game on 28 November 1997
- His best scoring record in the Spanish League was 47 points in the Unicaja Malaga - Forum Valladolid (99-101) on 27 November 1994, while on 19 March 1994 he had scored 11 three-pointers (Murcia - Forum Valladolid 96-87)
- With his 13,957 points in the Italian League remains the foreign player who scored the most, with an overall average of 34.6 points per game and game peaks of over 60 points, the first of which was recorded in 1984. He is the player who surpassed the 50 point mark the most times in the history of Italian basketball: he scored more than 50 pts in a single match 28 times out of 403 matches played (about 7%), ahead of Dražen Dalipagić (15/241 equal to 6.2%) and Joe Bryant (14/247, about 5.7%).
- He scored his Italian career high, with 66 points for Pavia (13/21 two-pointers, 11/26 three-pointers and 7/9 free throws) on November 30, 1991 during the home defeat against Torino (109-110).
- Retired club jerseys: #18 JuveCaserta (1990), #11 Pavia (1993), #14 C.R. Flamengo (2003)
- FIBA European Selection: (1991)
- FIBA's 50 Greatest Players: (1991)
- Olympic Order: (1997)
- FIBA Hall of Fame inductee: (2010)
- Basketball Hall of Fame: (2013)
- Italian Basketball Hall of Fame: (2017)
- Spanish Basketball Hall of Fame: (2022)

=== Various records ===
- He played 271 consecutive games for Caserta for 7 years in the Italian Serie A.
- Most points in a single game in the Brazilian National Club Championship (57), playing for Flamengo.
- Most points in a single game in the Liga Sudamericana de Baloncesto (46), playing for Flamengo against Ambassadors.
- Most points in a single game in the Pan-American Games (53), against Mexico, in 1987.
- Most points in a single game in the World Cup (52), against Australia, in 1990.
- Most consecutive games in the RJ State League (90), with Flamengo

=== As a member of pro club teams ===
- 4× São Paulo State Championship champion: 1974, Sírio 1978, 1979, 1998
- 3× Brazilian Championship champion: 1977, 1979, 1996
- South American Club Championship champion: 1979
- FIBA Intercontinental Cup champion: 1979
- Italian Cup winner: 1988
- 2× Rio de Janeiro State Championship champion: 1999, 2002

=== Brazil national team ===
- 3× FIBA South American Championship: Gold (1977, 1983, 1985)
- FIBA World Cup: Bronze (1978)
- 2× FIBA South American Championship: Silver: (1979, 1981)
- Pan American Games: Bronze (1979)
- Pan American Games: Gold (1987)
- FIBA AmeriCup: Bronze (1989)

== See also ==
- List of athletes with the most appearances at Olympic Games

== Sources ==
- Le classifiche del campionato italiano dal 1986 al 1990 at BatsWeb.Org
- Awards
