= Tullio Rochlitzer =

Italian-Croatian basketball player and coach

Personal information
- Born: 23 December 1926 Zara, Kingdom of Italy
- Died: 16 August 2006 (aged 79) Pavia, Italy

Career information
- Playing career: 1945–1960
- Position: Guard
- Number: 3
- Coaching career: 1952–1966

Career history

Playing
- 1945–1948: Zadar
- 1949–1951: Crvena zvezda
- 1951–1952: Gallaratese
- 1952–1957: Pavia
- 1957–1960: Vigevano

Coaching
- 1952–1955: Pavia
- 1958–1962: Vigevano
- 1962–1966: Bassi Lodi

Career highlights
- As player: 3× Yugoslav League champion (1949–1951)

Tullio Rochlitzer (Serbo-Croatian: Tulio Roklicer; December 23, 1926 – August 16, 2006) was an Italian-Croatian basketball player and coach. He represented Yugoslavia national basketball team internationally.

== Playing career ==
A guard, Rochlitzer played for his hometown team Zadar and Belgrade-based team Crvena zvezda between 1945 and 1951. During his stint with the Zvezda he won three Yugoslav Championships.

In 1951, Rochlitzer fled to Italy. In Italy he played for Gallaratese, Pavia, and Vigevano. He retired as a player with Vigevano in 1960.

== National team career ==
=== Yugoslavia ===
Rochlitzer was a member of the Yugoslavia national basketball team that participated at the 1947 European Championship in Prague, Czechoslovakia. Over five tournament games, he averaged 2.4 points per game.

=== Italy ===
Rochlitzer appeared in one game for the Italy national team in 1954.

== Coaching career ==
As a player-coach Rochlitzer coached Pavia and Vigevano.

== Career achievements and awards ==
- Yugoslav League champion: 3 (with Crvena zvezda: 1949, 1950, 1951).
