= Pallacanestro Pavia =

- Founded: 1943
- Dissolved: 2014
- History: Onda Pavia (1943–1948); Pallacanestro Pavia (1948–1958; 1975–1995; 2010–2014); Onda Pavia (1958–1975); Nuova Pallacanestro Pavia (1997–2010)
- Arena: PalaRavizza
- Location: Pavia, Lombardy, Italy
- Team colors: Blue, White

Pallacanestro Pavia was an Italian professional basketball club based in Pavia, Lombardy.

For past club sponsorship names, see the list below.

== History ==
The club was established in 1943 as Onda Pavia by industrialist Luigi Cazzani. In 1955–56, Pavia finished at third place in the Serie A, the national championship. It played in the first division until 1958 when it was expelled.

Onda Pavia was refounded a few years later. At the end of the 1978–79 season the team was promoted to the third division Serie B. The club then climbed to the second division in 1985. With the addition of experienced coach Tonino Zorzi and legendary player Oscar Schmidt, the side beat Sidis Reggio Emilia on 9 May 1991 in the playout to earn a return to Serie A.

Despite the efforts made by Oscar, top scorer of the league with 38.6 points per game, the team only lasted one season in the top division, being relegated in 1992. After a few unremarkable years in the second division and the departure of Oscar, the side went bankrupt in 1995.

In 1997, Nuova Pallacanestro Pavia was established as its successor and reached the second division in 2001. In 2005/2006 a 17-year-old Danilo Gallinari, the eventual Italian NBA star, played its first professional championship with Pavia, and the team then had its best season in 2006/2007, losing a promotion playoff final.

However, in June 2010 the side sold its right to play in the second division to Scaligera Basket Verona, voluntarily relegating to the third division Serie A dilettanti. At the same time it retook the name Pallacanestro Pavia.

After two years in that league, Pallacanestro Pavia again auto-relegated, this time to the fourth division Serie C after struggling to find financing. It only played a season at the level before choosing to move down to the sixth division Promozione.

Pallacanestro Pavia's last participation in a championship was in the 2013–14 season, playing in the seventh division Prima Divisione. Since then, the club has disappeared.

== Notable players ==
Note: Flags indicate national team eligibility at FIBA-sanctioned events. Players may hold other non-FIBA nationalities not displayed.

Criteria

To appear in this section a player must have either:

- Set a club record or won an individual award while at the club
- Played at least one official international match for their national team at any time
- Played at least one official NBA match at any time.

1950's

- (Socialist Federal Republic of Yugoslavia) Tullio Rochlitzer 6 seasons: '52–'57
- (Socialist Federal Republic of Yugoslavia) Đorđe Andrijašević 2 seasons: '57–'58

1980's

- (Italy) Mimmo Giroldi 5 seasons: '84–'89
- (United States) Cedrick Hordges 3 seasons: '85–'88
- (Italy) Giuseppe Ponzoni 4 seasons: '85–'89
- (Italy) Paolo Boesso 3 seasons: '86–'89
- (United States) Marcellus Starks 1 season: '87–'88
- (Argentina) Hernan Montenegro 2 seasons: '88–'90
- (United States) Mike Davis 1 season: '88–'89
- (United States) George Singleton 1 season: '88–'89
- (Italy) Stefano Attruia 1 season: '89–'90
- (United States) Robert Lock 3 seasons: '89–'92
- (Italy) Domenico Fantin 3 seasons: '89–'91, '92–'93

1990's

- (Italy) Moris Masetti 2 seasons: '90–'92
- (Brazil) Oscar Schmidt 3 seasons: '90–'93
- (United States) Bob Thornton 1 season: '92–'93
- (United States) Rod Griffin 1 season: '93–'94
- (Serbia and Montenegro) Zoran Radović 1 season: '93–'94
- (Italy) Giovanni Noli 2 seasons: '93–'95
- (United States) Randy Allen 1 season: '94–'95

2000's

- (United States) Mike Iuzzolino 1 season: '02-'03
- (United States) Malik Dixon 1 season: '03-'04
- (Italy) Danilo Gallinari 1 season: '05–'06
- (Argentina) Maximiliano Stanic 1 season: '06-'07
- (United States) Chris Monroe 1 season: '06-'07
- (United States) Jeff Viggiano 1 season: '08-'09

== Retired numbers ==
Pallacanestro Pavia retired numbers
N°	Nat.	Player	Position	Tenure	Date Retired
11	(Brazil)	Oscar Schmidt	SF	1990–1993	1993

== Sponsorship names ==
Throughout the years, due to sponsorship, the club has been known as :

- Necchi Pavia: (1955–1957)
- Annabella Pavia: (1985–1990)
- Fernet Branca Pavia: (1990–1993)
- Sacil HLB Pavia: (2001–2002)
- Edimes Pavia: (2002–2009)
