= Tijuca Tênis Clube =

- Leagues: NBB
- Founded: 1915 (parent athletic club)
- Arena: Ginásio Álvaro Vieira Lima
- Capacity: 3,000
- Location: Rio de Janeiro, Brazil
- Team colors: White and Red
- President: (Brazil) Paulo Maciel
- Head coach: (Brazil) Miguel Ângelo
- Website: tijucatenis.com.br
Home	Away

Tijuca Tênis Clube, abbreviated as Tijuca T.C., is a Brazilian professional basketball club that is based in the Tijuca neighborhood, in the Northern Zone of the city of Rio de Janeiro, Brazil.

== History ==
Tijuca's parent athletic association was founded in 1915, initially as a tennis club, with the name Tijuca Lawn Tennis Club. Basketball was introduced later, and became the club's most popular sport. Tijuca has reached the final of the Rio de Janeiro State Championship ten times, losing them all. In 2010, 2011, and 2012, Tijuca lost to Flamengo in the Rio de Janeiro State Finals.

In 2011, the team won the Brazilian Super Cup against Liga Sorocabana, and acquired the right to play in Brazil's top-tier level league, the NBB, in the 2011–12 season. In that season, Tijuca finished the regular season in twelfth place in the league. In the playoffs, the team was beaten by Uberlândia.

== Roster ==
Note: Flags indicate national team eligibility at FIBA-sanctioned events. Players may hold other non-FIBA nationalities not displayed.

Tijuca Tênis Clube roster
Players	Coaches
Pos. / No. / Nat. / Name / Ht.; CG / 31 / (Brazil) / Garcia Hubner, Marcos Sather / 2.05 m (6 ft 9 in)	Head coach: (Brazil) Eldio Leal; Assistant coach(es): (Brazil) Daniel Chaves Bello; Legend: (C) Team captain; Injured; Roster; Updated: 2013-03-17

== Honors and titles ==
=== National ===
- Brazilian Super Cup
  - Winners (1): 2011
- Brazilian 2nd Division
  - Champions (1): 1997

=== Regional ===
- Rio de Janeiro State Championship
  - Runners-up (10): 1945, 1960, 1961, 1993, 1994, 1995, 1996, 2010, 2011, 2012

== Other sports ==
Besides the club's basketball team, Tijuca T.C. also has other sports sections for futsal, swimming, and several other sports.
