= Vila Nova Basquete Clube =

Vila Nova Basquete
- Nickname: Tigre (Tiger); O Time do Povo (The People's Team); Colorado; Tigrão (Big Tiger)
- History: 1943; 82 years ago (parent athletic club)
- Location: Goiânia, Goiás, Brazil
- Team colors: Red, White
- Championships: 1 Brazilian Championship
- Website: vilanovafc.com.br
Home	Away

Vila Nova Basquete Clube is a Brazilian men's professional basketball club that is based in Goiânia, Goiás, Brazil. It is a part of the multi-sports club Vila Nova Esporte Clube.

== History ==
Vila Nova won the Brazilian Championship title in 1973. They also competed at the 1974 edition of the FIBA Intercontinental Cup.

== Honors and titles ==
=== National ===
- Brazilian Championship
  - Champions (1): 1973
  - Runners-up (1): 1974

== Notable players ==
Note: Flags indicate national team eligibility at FIBA-sanctioned events. Players may hold other non-FIBA nationalities not displayed.

Criteria

To appear in this section a player must have either:

- Set a club record or won an individual award while at the club
- Played at least one official international match for their national team at any time
- Played at least one official NBA match at any time.

- (Brazil) Washington "Dodi" Joseph
- (Brazil) Marquinhos Leite
- (Brazil) Adilson Nascimento

== Head coaches ==
- (Brazil) Togo "Kanela" Renan Soares
