= Campeonato Brasileiro de Basquete =

Basketball championship title in Brazil

Campeonato Brasileiro de Basquete Brazilian Basketball Championship
- Founded: 1965
- Country: Brazil
- Level on pyramid: 1st
- Related competitions: São Paulo State Championship; Rio de Janeiro State Championship
- Current champions: Franca (2024–25)
- Most championships: Franca (15 titles)
- Website: http://lnb.com.br/
- 2022–23 NBB season

The Campeonato Brasileiro de Basquete (English: Brazilian Basketball Championship) is the annual championship title of the top-tier level men's professional basketball league in Brazil. Over the years, the championship has been held under different leagues. From 1990 to 2008, the top-tier level league competition in Brazil also held the name of Campeonato Brasileiro de Basquete.

== History ==
=== Taça Brasil de Basquete (1965–1989) ===
From 1965 to 1989, Brazil's top-tier level basketball championship was contested in the Taça Brasil de Basquete (Brazilian Basketball Cup) league. It was organized by the Brazilian Basketball Confederation (CBB). In 1990, it was replaced by the Campeonato Nacional de Basquete (National Basketball Championship).

=== Campeonato Nacional de Basquete (1990–2008) ===
From 1990 to 2008, Brazil's top-tier level basketball championship was contested in the Campeonato Nacional de Basquete (National Basketball Championship), also called Campeonato Brasileiro de Basquete (Brazilian Basketball Championship) league. It was organized by the Brazilian Basketball Confederation (CBB). The Campeonato Nacional had organizational problems, and in 2004, it was nicknamed the "Liga do Busão" ("bus league"), due to the team's transportation by bus, as the CBB wouldn't pay for it, and airplanes tickets were too expensive. In 2009, it was replaced by the Novo Basquete Brasil (NBB), organized by the Liga Nacional de Basquete (LNB).

=== Novo Basquete Brasil (2009–present) ===
Since 2009, Brazil's top-tier level basketball championship is contested in the Novo Basquete Brasil. The NBB is endorsed by the Brazilian Basketball Confederation (CBB), and is organized by the Liga Nacional de Basquete (LNB), in a new format of the Brazilian premier basketball league. The league is managed, for the first time, by 19 Brazilian basketball teams, all of which were LNB founding members.

== List of champions ==
=== Taça Brasil de Basquete ===
Season	Champion	Score	Runner-up
1965	(São Paulo (state)) Corinthians	2–1	(Rio de Janeiro (state)) Vasco da Gama
1966	(São Paulo (state)) Corinthians	76–62 (single game)	(Rio de Janeiro (state)) Vasco da Gama
1967	(Rio de Janeiro (state)) Botafogo	Quadrangular final	(São Paulo (state)) Corinthians
1968	(São Paulo (state)) Sírio	Hexagonal final	(São Paulo (state)) Corinthians
1969	(São Paulo (state)) Corinthians	Pentagonal final	(São Paulo (state)) Sírio
1970	(São Paulo (state)) Sírio	Hexagonal final	(São Paulo (state)) Corinthians
1971	(São Paulo (state)) Franca	Quadrangular final	(São Paulo (state)) Sírio
1972	(São Paulo (state)) Sírio	Hexagonal final	(Rio de Janeiro (state)) Fluminense
1973	(Goiás) Vila Nova	Heptagonal final	(São Paulo (state)) Trianon
1974	(São Paulo (state)) Franca	Hexagonal final	(Goiás) Vila Nova
1975	(São Paulo (state)) Franca	Quadrangular final	(São Paulo (state)) Palmeiras
1976	Tournament canceled		
1977	(São Paulo (state)) Palmeiras	66–62 (single game)	(Rio de Janeiro (state)) Flamengo
1978	(São Paulo (state)) Sírio	110–85 (single game)	(São Paulo (state)) Palmeiras
1979	(São Paulo (state)) Sírio	87–86 (single game)	(São Paulo (state)) Franca
1980	(São Paulo (state)) Franca	87–67 (single game)	(Rio de Janeiro (state)) Vasco da Gama
1981 (I)	(São Paulo (state)) São José	74–72 (single game)	(São Paulo (state)) Franca
1981 (II)	(São Paulo (state)) Franca	Quadrangular final	(São Paulo (state)) Sírio
1982	(São Paulo (state)) Monte Líbano	Quadrangular final	(São Paulo (state)) Franca
1983	(São Paulo (state)) Sírio	Quadrangular final	(São Paulo (state)) Corinthians
1984–85	(São Paulo (state)) Monte Líbano	Quadrangular final	(Rio de Janeiro (state)) Flamengo
1985–86	(São Paulo (state)) Monte Líbano	Quadrangular final	(São Paulo (state)) Corinthians
1986	(São Paulo (state)) Monte Líbano	Quadrangular final	(São Paulo (state)) Franca
1987	(São Paulo (state)) Monte Líbano	Quadrangular final	(São Paulo (state)) Sírio
1988–89	(São Paulo (state)) Sírio	Hexagonal final	(São Paulo (state)) Franca

=== Campeonato Nacional de Basquete ===
Season	Champion	Score	Runner-up
1990	(São Paulo (state)) Franca	3–0	(São Paulo (state)) Lwart/Lwarcel
1991	(São Paulo (state)) Franca	3–1	(São Paulo (state)) Ipê
1992	(São Paulo (state)) Rio Claro	1–0	(São Paulo (state)) Ipê
1993	(São Paulo (state)) Franca	1–0	(São Paulo (state)) Ipê
1994	(Rio Grande do Sul) União Corinthians	3–2	(São Paulo (state)) Franca
1995	(São Paulo (state)) Rio Claro	3–1	(São Paulo (state)) Franca
1996	(São Paulo (state)) Corinthians	3–1	(Rio Grande do Sul) União Corinthians
1997	(São Paulo (state)) Franca	3–2	(Rio Grande do Sul) União Corinthians
1998	(São Paulo (state)) Franca	3–2	(São Paulo (state)) COC/Ribeirão Preto
1999	(São Paulo (state)) Franca	3–2	(Rio de Janeiro (state)) Vasco da Gama
2000	(Rio de Janeiro (state)) Vasco da Gama	3–1	(Rio de Janeiro (state)) Flamengo
2001	(Rio de Janeiro (state)) Vasco da Gama	3–0	(São Paulo (state)) COC/Ribeirão Preto
2002	(São Paulo (state)) Bauru	3–0	(São Paulo (state)) Araraquara
2003	(São Paulo (state)) COC/Ribeirão Preto	3–1	(Minas Gerais) Uberlândia
2004	(Minas Gerais) Uberlândia	3–0	(Rio de Janeiro (state)) Flamengo
2005	(Rio de Janeiro (state)) Telemar/Rio de Janeiro	3–1	(Minas Gerais) Uberlândia
2006	Tournament canceled		
2007	(Federal District (Brazil)) Lobos Brasília	3–1	(São Paulo (state)) Franca
2008	(Rio de Janeiro (state)) Flamengo	3–0	(Federal District (Brazil)) Lobos Brasília

=== Novo Basquete Brasil ===
Season	Champion	Score	Runner-up
2009	(Rio de Janeiro (state)) Flamengo	3–2	(Federal District (Brazil)) Lobos Brasília
2009–10	(Federal District (Brazil)) Lobos Brasília	3–2	(Rio de Janeiro (state)) Flamengo
2010–11	(Federal District (Brazil)) Lobos Brasília	3–1	(São Paulo (state)) Franca
2011–12	(Federal District (Brazil)) Lobos Brasília	78–62 (single game)	(São Paulo (state)) São José
2012–13	(Rio de Janeiro (state)) Flamengo	77–70 (single game)	(Minas Gerais) Uberlândia
2013–14	(Rio de Janeiro (state)) Flamengo	78–73 (single game)	(São Paulo (state)) Paulistano
2014–15	(Rio de Janeiro (state)) Flamengo	2–0	(São Paulo (state)) Bauru
2015–16	(Rio de Janeiro (state)) Flamengo	3–2	(São Paulo (state)) Bauru
2016–17	(São Paulo (state)) Bauru	3–2	(São Paulo (state)) Paulistano
2017–18	(São Paulo (state)) Paulistano	3–1	(São Paulo (state)) Mogi das Cruzes
2018–19	(Rio de Janeiro (state)) Flamengo	3–2	(São Paulo (state)) Franca
2019–20	Tournament canceled after the regular season due to the COVID-19 pandemic		
2020–21	(Rio de Janeiro (state)) Flamengo	3–0	(São Paulo (state)) São Paulo
2021–22	(São Paulo (state)) Franca	3–1	(Rio de Janeiro (state)) Flamengo
2022–23	(São Paulo (state)) Franca	3–2	(São Paulo (state)) São Paulo
2023–24	(São Paulo (state)) Franca	3–1	(Rio de Janeiro (state)) Flamengo
2024–25	(São Paulo (state)) Franca	3–1	(Minas Gerais) Minas

== Titles by club ==
Including all three league formats, the Taça Brasil de Basquete, the Campeonato Brasileiro de Basquete, and the Novo Basquete Brasil (NBB).

=== By team ===
Club	Winners	Runners-up	Years won	Years runner-rup
(São Paulo (state)) Franca	15	9	1971, 1974, 1975, 1980, 1981 (II), 1990, 1991, 1993, 1997, 1998, 1999, 2021–22, 2022–23, 2023–24, 2024–25	1979, 1981 (I), 1982, 1986, 1988–89, 1994, 2007, 2010–11, 2018–19
(Rio de Janeiro (state)) Flamengo	8	7	2008, 2008–09, 2012–13, 2013–14, 2014–15, 2015–16, 2018–19, 2020–21	1977, 1984–85, 2000, 2004, 2009–10, 2021–22, 2023–24
(São Paulo (state)) Sírio	7	4	1968, 1970, 1972, 1978, 1979, 1983, 1988–89	1969, 1971, 1981 (II), 1987
(São Paulo (state)) Monte Líbano	5	0	1982, 1984–85, 1985–86, 1986, 1987	—
(São Paulo (state)) Corinthians	4	5	1965, 1966, 1969, 1996	1967, 1968, 1970, 1983, 1985–86
(Federal District (Brazil)) Lobos Brasília	4	2	2007, 2009–10, 2010–11, 2011–12	2008, 2008–09
(Rio de Janeiro (state)) Vasco da Gama	2	4	2000, 2001	1965, 1966, 1980, 1999
(São Paulo (state)) Bauru	2	2	2002, 2016–17	2014–15, 2015–16
(São Paulo (state)) Rio Claro	2	0	1992, 1995	—
(Minas Gerais) Uberlândia	1	3	2004	2003, 2005, 2012–13
(São Paulo (state)) Palmeiras	1	2	1977	1975, 1978
(Rio Grande do Sul) União Corinthians	1	2	1994	1996, 1997
(São Paulo (state)) COC/Ribeirão Preto	1	2	2003	1998, 2001
(São Paulo (state)) Paulistano	1	2	2017–18	2013–14, 2016–17
(Goiás) Vila Nova	1	1	1973	1974
(São Paulo (state)) São José	1	1	1981 (I)	2011–12
(Rio de Janeiro (state)) Botafogo	1	0	1967	—
(Rio de Janeiro (state)) Telemar/Rio de Janeiro	1	0	2005	—

=== By state ===
State	Winners	Runners-up
São Paulo	39	37
Rio de Janeiro	12	12
Distrito Federal	4	2
Minas Gerais	1	4
Rio Grande do Sul	1	2
Goiás	1	1

== Players with most titles ==
In bold, players that are still active.

Player	Winners	Seasons won
Fausto Giannecchini	7	1971, 1973, 1974, 1975, 1980, 1981 (II), 1983
Marcelinho Machado	7	2005, 2008, 2009, 2012–13, 2013–14, 2014–15, 2015–16
Demétrius Ferraciú	6	1993, 1997, 1998, 2000, 2001, 2005
Helinho	6	1997, 1998, 1999, 2000, 2001, 2004
**Marquinhos Vieira**	6	2002, 2012–13, 2013–14, 2014–15, 2015–16, 2018–19
**Alex Garcia**	6	2003, 2007, 2009–10, 2010–11, 2011–12, 2016–17
Bira Maciel	5	1965, 1966, 1969, 1977, 1981 (I)
Washington "Dodi" Joseph	5	1968, 1970, 1972, 1978, 1979
Roberto "Robertão" José Corrêa	5	1971, 1974, 1975, 1980, 1981 (II)
Marco "Chuí" dos Santos	5	1981 (II), 1988–89, 1993, 1998, 1999
Ricardo "Cadum" Guimarães	5	1982, 1984–85, 1985–86, 1986, 1987
Maury de Souza	5	1983, 1984–85, 1985–86, 1986, 1987
João "Pipoka" Vianna	5	1985, 1985–86, 1986, 1987, 2007
Valtinho da Silva	5	1995, 1999, 2004, 2009–10, 2016–17
Rogério Klafke	5	1997, 1998, 2000, 2001, 2004
**Nezinho dos Santos**	5	2003, 2007, 2009–10, 2010–11, 2011–12
**Gegê Chaia**	5	2012–13, 2013–14, 2014–15, 2015–16, 2016–17
**Carlos Olivinha**	5	2012–13, 2013–14, 2014–15, 2015–16, 2018–19
Hélio Rubens Garcia	4	1971, 1974, 1975, 1980
Marquinhos Leite	4	1972, 1979, 1983, 1988–89
Gilson Trinidade de Jesus	4	1974, 1975, 1977, 1981 (II)
Jorge "Guerrinha" Guerra	4	1980, 1981 (II), 1990, 1991
André Stoffel	4	1982, 1985, 1985–86, 1986
Israel Andrade	4	1982, 1985, 1985–86, 1986
Paulinho Villas Boas	4	1983, 1987, 1992, 1995
Josuel dos Santos	4	1993, 1995, 2002, 2005
**Duda Machado**	4	2007, 2008, 2009, 2012–13

== Nossa Liga de Basquete (unofficial) ==
During the 2005–06 season, the Campeonato Nacional de Basquete, which was organized by the Brazilian Basketball Confederation (CBB), was cancelled due to a legal dispute between the CBB and the Nossa Liga de Basquetebol (NLB). Winner/Limeira was the champion of the competition that was organized by the NLB. The NLB was led by the former player Oscar Schmidt.

Season	Champion	Score	Runner-up
2006	(São Paulo (state)) Limeira	1–0	(São Paulo (state)) Araraquara

== Top scorers ==
=== By total points ===
Source: cbb.com.br

Season	Player	Club	Points
1979	(Brazil) Oscar Schmidt	Sirio	
1980	(Brazil) Oscar Schmidt	Sirio	
1990	(Brazil) Luiz Felipe de Azevedo	Lwart/Lwarcel	505
1991	(Brazil) Luiz Felipe de Azevedo (2)	Clube do Ipe	529
1992	(Brazil) Paulinho Villas Boas	Rio Claro	494
1993	(United States) Dexter Shouse	Franca	466
1994	(United States) Alvin Frederick	União Corinthians-RS	431
1995	(United States) Robyn Terence Davis	Clube do Ipe	755
1996	(Brazil) Oscar Schmidt	Corinthians	959
1997	(Brazil) Oscar Schmidt	Bandeirandes	992
1998	(Brazil) Oscar Schmidt	Bandeirandes	1.113
1999	(Brazil) Oscar Schmidt	Flamengo	1.375
2000	(Brazil) Oscar Schmidt	Flamengo	1.327
2001	(Brazil) Oscar Schmidt	Flamengo	1.121
2002	(Brazil) Oscar Schmidt	Flamengo	1.183
2003	(Brazil) Oscar Schmidt (10)	Flamengo	1.026
2004	(Brazil) Vanderlei Mazzuchini	Universo/Ajax	723
2005	(Brazil) Marcelinho Machado	Unitri/Uberlândia	1.124
2007	(United States) Victor Thomas	Minas Tênis Clube	671
2008	(Brazil) Marcelinho Machado	Flamengo	732
2008–09	(Brazil) Marcelinho Machado	Flamengo	1.047
2009–10	(Brazil) Marcelinho Machado	Flamengo	934
2010–11	(Brazil) Marcelinho Machado (5)	Flamengo	918
2011–12	(Brazil) Murilo Becker	São José	743
2012–13	(Brazil) Marquinhos	Flamengo	872
2013–14	(United States) David Jackson	Limeirense de Basquete	761
2014–15	(United States) Shamell Stallworth	Mogi das Cruzes	777
2015–16	(United States) Shamell Stallworth	Mogi das Cruzes	687
2016–17	(United States) Desmond Holloway	Esporte Clube Pinheiros	831
2017–18	(Brazil) Marquinhos (2)	Flamengo	626
2018–19	(United States) Kyle Fuller	Corinthians	661
2019–20	(United States) Shamell Stallworth (3)	São Paulo	489
2020–21	(Brazil) Lucas Dias	Flamengo	728
2021–22	(Brazil) Lucas Mariano	Franca	807
2022–23	(Brazil) Lucas Mariano (2)	Franca	751
2023–24	(Brazil) Lucas Dias (2)	Franca	706

=== By average (NBB) ===
Season	Player	Club	PPG
2008–09	(Brazil) Marcelinho Machado	Flamengo	26.8
2009–10	(Brazil) Marcelinho Machado	Flamengo	25.9
2010–11	(Brazil) Marcelinho Machado	Flamengo	26.2
2011–12	(Brazil) Murilo Becker	São José	20.6
2012–13	(United States) Desmond Holloway	Liga Sorocabana	20.3
2013–14	(United States) Shamell Stallworth	Esporte Clube Pinheiros	20.8
2014–15	(United States) Shamell Stallworth (2)	Mogi das Cruzes	19.9
2015–16	(Brazil) Neto	Liga Sorocabana	19.1
2016–17	(United States) Kendall Anthony	Associação Macaé de Basquete	20.6
2017–18	(Brazil) Marquinhos	Flamengo	17.9
2018–19	(United States) Kyle Fuller	Corinthians	20.7
2019–20	(Brazil) Leandro Barbosa	Minas Tênis Clube	20.1
2020–21	(Brazil) Lucas Dias	Flamengo	22,8
2021–22	(Brazil) Lucas Mariano	Franca	18,8
2022–23	(United States) Dexter McClanahan	Fortaleza Esporte Clube/Cearense	21,4
2023–24	(Brazil) Lucas Dias (2)	Franca	19.61

=== Players with most awards ===
Total points

Player	Awards	Years
(Brazil) Oscar Schmidt	10	1979, 1980, 1996–2003
(Brazil) Marcelinho Machado	5	2005, 2008–2011
(United States) Shamell Stallworth	3	2015, 2016, 2020
(Brazil) Luiz Felipe de Azevedo	2	1990, 1991
(Brazil) Lucas Dias	2	2021, 2024
(Brazil) Lucas Mariano	2	2022, 2023
(Brazil) Lucas Dias	2	2021, 2024
(Brazil) Marquinhos	2	2013, 2018

=== All-time topscorers (1990–2008) ===
Stats are calculated for the Campeonato Nacional de Basquete from the 1st edition in 1990.
As of 16 May 2007.

Rank	Player	Points	Games	Notes	Average
1	(Brazil) Rogerio Klafke	9.133	510	1993–2013	17.9 PPG
2	(Brazil) Oscar Schmidt	9.096	258	1996–2003	35.2 PPG

=== All-time scorers (2008 – present) ===
Source: lnb.com.br

Stats are calculated for the NBB.
As of 24 November 2024.

Rank	Player	Points	Career
1	(United States) (Brazil) Shamell Stallworth	9005	
2	(Brazil) Marquinhos Vieira	8846	
3	(Brazil) Alex	8311	
4	(Brazil) Carlos Olivinha	7051	
5	(United States) (Brazil) Larry Taylor	6574	
6	(Brazil) Betinho Duarte	6191	
7	(Brazil) Jefferson William	6144	
8	(United States) David Jackson	6021	
9	(Brazil) Lucas Mariano	5959	
10	(Brazil) Lucas Dias	5855	

== Coaches ==
Source: Coaches Ranking 1990-2008

Stats are calculated for the Campeonato (1990–2008).
As of 30 June 2008.

Rank	Coach	Games	Wins	Defeats	Career	Teams
1	(Brazil) Hélio Rubens Garcia	566	400	166	1990-2007	Franca, Vasco, Uberlândia, Franca
2	(Brazil) Ênio Angelo Vecchi	351	168	183	1994-2007	Sírio, Londrina (PR), Pinheiros (SP), Uberlândia
3	(Brazil) Zé Boquinha	319	196	123	1990-2006	Flamengo, Ipê (SP), Rio Claro (SP), Corinthians (SP), Rio Claro (SP), Flamengo, Ajax (GO), Campos (RJ), Uberlândia (MG), Universo/BRB, Telemar (RJ)
4	(Brazil) Lula Ferreira	310	190	120	1991-2006	Palmeriras, Ribeirão Preto
5	(Brazil) Guerrinha	296	182	114	1998-2007	Ribeirão Preto (SP), Bauru, Campos (RJ), Rio Claro (SP)
6	(Brazil) Claudio Mortari	290	180	110	1990-2003	Clube Atlético Pirelli (SP), Sírio, Telesp, Rio Claro, Mogi (SP), Barueri (SP), Flamengo, Campos (RJ)
7	(Brazil) Marco Antonio de Paiva Aga	281	125	156	1996-2006	Joinville (SC), Akros/Joinville (SC), Corinthians (RS), Casa Branca (SP), Uberlândia (MG), Casa Branca (SP), Assis (SP)
8	(Brazil) Alberto Bial	277	146	131	1991-2006	Botafogo, Liga Angrense (RJ), Vasco, Fluminense, Ajax (GO), Joinville (SC)

== Awards ==
=== MVP ===
Season	Player	Club
1996	(Brazil) Oscar Schmidt	Corinthians
2005	(Brazil) Marcelinho Machado	Unitri/Uberlândia
2008	(Brazil) Marcelinho Machado	Flamengo

=== Finals MVP ===
Season	Player	Club
1996	(Brazil) Oscar Schmidt	Corinthians
2003	(Brazil) Renato Lamas Pinto	COC/Ribeirão Preto
2008	(Brazil) Marcelinho Machado	Flamengo

== Statistical leaders ==
The leaders are average per game.

Season		Assists		Steals		Topscorer		Blocks		Rebounds
1996	(Brazil)	Maury (Guaru)	(Brazil)	Demétrius Conrado Ferraciú (Franca)	(Brazil)	Oscar Schmidt (Corinthians)	(Brazil)	Rogério Klafke (Franca)	(Brazil)	Caio Silveira (Nosso Clube-Limeira)
1997	(United States)	Marc Brown (Corinthians-RS)	(Brazil)	Luiz Felipe (ABAJ-Joinville)	(Brazil)	Oscar Schmidt (Corinthians)	(Brazil)	Pipoka (Mogi das Cruzes)	(Brazil)	Josuel (COC/Ribeirão Preto)
1998	(Brazil)	Demétrius Conrado Ferraciú (Franca)	(United States)	Ernest Patterson (Palmeiras)	(Brazil)	Oscar Schimdt (Bandeirantes/Barueri)	(Brazil)	Pipoka (Mogi das Cruzes)	(United States)	Leon Jones (Palmeiras)
1999	(Brazil)	Maury (Bauru)	(Brazil)	Marcelinho Machado (Botafogo)	(Brazil)	Oscar Schimdt (Mackenzie/Microcamp/Barueri)	(Brazil)	Pipoka (Flamengo)	(Brazil)	Josuel (Mackenzie/Microcamp/Barueri)
2000	(Brazil)	Maury (Bauru)	(Brazil)	Demétrius Conrado Ferraciú (Vasco)	(Brazil)	Oscar Schimdt (Flamengo)	(Brazil)	Alírio (Mogi das Cruzes)	(Brazil)	Gastão (Casa Branca)
2001	(Brazil)	Álvaro Reis (Unisanta)	(Brazil)	Fúlvio (Casa Branca)	(Brazil)	Oscar Schimdt (Flamengo)	(Brazil)	Marcionílio (Universo/Ajax)	(United States)	Mike Higgins (Fluminense)
2002	(Brazil)	Valtinho (Unit/Uberlândia)	(Brazil)	Demétrius (Minas)	(Brazil)	Oscar Schimdt (Flamengo)	(Brazil)	Alírio (Mogi das Cruzes)	(Brazil)	Janjão (Flamengo)
2003	(Argentina)	Daniel Farabello (Vasco)	(Brazil)	Valtinho (Unit/Uberlândia)	(Brazil)	Oscar Schimdt (Flamengo)	(Brazil)	Alírio (Mogi das Cruzes)	(Brazil)	Ricardo Probst (Londrina)
2004	(Brazil)	Nezinho (COC/Ribeirão Preto)	(Brazil)	Valtinho (Unit/Uberlândia)	(Brazil)	Vanderlei Mazzuchini (Universo/Ajax)	(Brazil)	Alírio (Corinthians/Mogi)	(Brazil)	Luís Fernando (Araraquara)
2005	(Brazil)	Nezinho (COC/Ribeirão Preto)	(Brazil)	Marcelinho Machado (Telemar/Rio de Janeiro)	(Brazil)	Marcelinho Machado (Telemar/Rio de Janeiro)	(Brazil)	Todão (Ulbra/Torres)	(Brazil)	Ricardo Probst (Paulistano)
2006	(Brazil)	Nezinho (COC/Ribeirão Preto)	(Brazil)	Demétrius (Franca)	(Brazil)	Jefferson William (COC/Ribeirão Preto)	(Brazil)	Murilo Becker (Franca)	(Brazil)	Paulão Prestes (COC/Ribeirão Preto)
2007	(Argentina)	Facundo Sucatzky (Minas)	(Brazil)	Nezinho (Lobos Brasília)	(United States)	Victor Thomas (Minas)	(Brazil)	Alírio (Lobos Brasília)	(Brazil)	Shilton (Joinville BA)
2008	(Argentina)	Facundo Sucatzky (Minas)	(Brazil)	Duda Machado (Flamengo)	(Brazil)	Marcelinho Machado (Flamengo)	(Brazil)	Estevam Ferreira (Lobos Brasília)	(Brazil)	Shilton (Joinville BA)
2009	(Argentina)	Facundo Sucatzky (Minas)	(United States)	Larry Taylor (Bauru)	(Brazil)	Marcelinho Machado (Flamengo)	(Brazil)	Guilherme Teichmann (Limeira)	(Brazil)	Shilton (Joinville BA)
2009–10	(Argentina)	Facundo Sucatzky (Minas)	(United States)	Magen McNeil (Cetaf)	(Brazil)	Marcelinho Machado (Flamengo)	(Brazil)	Adriano Machado (ADL-Londrina)	(Brazil)	Olivinha (Pinheiros)
2010–11	(Brazil)	Fúlvio (São José)	(Brazil)	Nezinho (Lobos Brasília)	(Brazil)	Marcelinho Machado (Flamengo)	(Brazil)	Adriano Machado (Assis)	(Brazil)	Shilton (Joinville BA)
2011–12	(Brazil)	Fúlvio (São José)	(United States)	Kojo Mensah (Joinville BA)	(Brazil)	Murilo Becker (São José)	(Brazil)	Léo Waszkiewicz (Unitri/Uberlândia)	(Brazil)	Murilo Becker (São José)
2012–13	(Brazil)	Fúlvio (São José)	(Brazil)	Neto (Liga Sorocabana)	(United States)	Desmond Holloway (Liga Sorocabana)	(Brazil)	Felipe Ribeiro (Basquete Cearense)	(Brazil)	Olivinha (Flamengo)
2013–14	(Brazil)	Valtinho (Unitri/Uberlândia)	(Argentina)	Maxi Stanic (Palmeiras)	(United States)	Shamell Stallworth (Pinheiros)	(Brazil)	Morro (Pinheiros)	(Brazil)	Jefferson William (São José)
2014–15	(Brazil)	Ricardo Fischer (Bauru)	(United States)	Worrell Clahar (Liga Sorocabana)	(United States)	Shamell Stallworth (Mogi das Cruzes)	(United States)	Jerome Meyinsse (Flamengo)	(Brazil)	Caio Torres (São José)
2015–16	(Brazil)	Fúlvio (Lobos Brasília)	(Brazil)	Neto (Liga Sorocabana)	(Brazil)	Neto (Liga Sorocabana)	(Brazil)	Thiago Mathias (Franca)	(Brazil)	Guilherme Teichmann (Rio Claro)
2016–17	(Brazil)	Fúlvio (Lobos Brasília)	(United States)	Kenny Dawkins (Universo/EC Vitória)	(United States)	Kendall Anthony (Macaé)	(Brazil)	Léo Waszkiewicz (Basquete Cearense)	(Brazil)	Olivinha (Flamengo)
2017–18	(Brazil)	Gegê (Minas)	(United States)	Deonta Stocks (Joinville-AABJ)	(Brazil)	Marquinhos (Flamengo)	(Brazil)	Guilherme Teichmann (Minas)	(Brazil)	Léo Waszkiewicz (Basquete Cearense)
2018–19	(Brazil)	Gegê (Minas)	(Brazil)	Jefferson Socas (Joinville-AABJ)	(United States)	Kyle Fuller (Corinthians)	(Brazil)	Léo Waszkiewicz (Minas)	(Brazil)	J.P. Batista (Mogi das Cruzes)
2019–20	(Uruguay)	Pepo Vidal (Unifacisa)	(Brazil)	Gegê (Pato Basquete)	(Brazil)	Leandrinho Barbosa (Minas)	(Brazil)	João Vitor (Unifacisa)	(Brazil)	Georginho (São Paulo)
2020–21	(Brazil)	Fúlvio (Mogi das Cruzes)	(United States)	Dontrell Brite (Fortaleza/Basq. Cearense)	(Brazil)	Lucas Dias (Franca)	(Brazil)	Lucas Mariano (São Paulo)	(Brazil)	Thiago Mathias (Fortaleza/Basq. Cearense)
2021–22	(Brazil)	Elinho (São Paulo)	(United States) (Brazil)	Dontrell Brite (Bauru); Guilherme Lessa (Mogi das Cruzes)	(Brazil)	Lucas Mariano (Franca)	(Brazil)	Bruno Caboclo (São Paulo)	(Brazil)	Mãozinha (Fortaleza/Basq. Cearense)
2022–23	(Brazil)	Elinho (São Paulo)	(Brazil)	Adyel (Paulistano)	(United States)	Dexter McClanahan (Fortaleza/Basq. Cearense)	(Brazil)	Mãozinha (Corinthians)	(Brazil)	Mãozinha (Corinthians)
2023–24	(Brazil)	Elinho (Corinthians)	(United States)	Dontrell Brite (Bauru)	(United States)	Isaac Thornton (Botafogo)	(Brazil)	França (Botafogo)	(Brazil)	Ruan (Paulistano)

== See also ==
- Novo Basquete Brasil (NBB)
- São Paulo State Championship
- Rio de Janeiro State Championship

== Sources ==
- Champions
