= Hélio Rubens =

Brazilian basketball player and coach (born 1940)

Hélio Rubens Garcia
Personal information
- Born: 2 September 1940 (age 86) Franca, Brazil
- Listed height: 5 ft 11 in (1.80 m)
- Listed weight: 175 lb (79 kg)

Career information
- Playing career: 1959–1984
- Position: Point guard
- Coaching career: 1984–present

Career history

Playing
- 1959–1984: Franca

Coaching
- 1989–1999: Franca
- 1999–2002: Vasco da Gama
- 1990–2002: Brazil
- 2003–2004: Unitri/Uberlândia

Career highlights
- As a player: 4× Brazilian champion (1971, 1974, 1975, 1980); As a head coach: 9× Brazilian champion (1990, 1991, 1993, 1997–2001, 2004); Brazilian League Coach of the Year (2011)
Medals
Men's basketball
Representing Brazil
FIBA World Cup
Bronze medal – third place	1967 Montevideo
Silver medal – second place	1970 Ljubljana
Bronze medal – third place	1978 Manila

Hélio Rubens Garcia (born Franca, Brazil, September 2, 1940), also commonly known as Hélio Rubens, is a former Brazilian professional basketball player and coach. He is the father of Helinho, who is the current head coach of Franca.

== Professional playing career ==
During his pro club career, he won 4 Brazilian Championships, in the years 1971, 1974, 1975, and 1980.

== Coaching career ==
At his retirement at age 43, he was player-coach of Franca.

== National team playing career ==
With the senior Brazilian national basketball team, Rubens Garcia played at the 1967, 1970, 1974 and 1978 editions of the FIBA World Cup. He also played at the 1968 Summer Olympic Games, and the 1972 Summer Olympic Games.

== National team coaching career ==
Hélio Rubens was the head coach of the senior Brazilian national basketball team at the 1990 FIBA World Cup, the 1998 FIBA World Cup, and the 2002 FIBA World Cup.
