= Bira Maciel =

Brazilian basketball player (1944–2002)

Ubiratan Pereira Maciel
- Maciel, as a member of Trianon Clube, in 1972.

Personal information
- Born: January 18, 1944 São Paulo, Brazil
- Died: July 17, 2002 (aged 58) Brasília, Brazil
- Listed height: 199 cm (6 ft 6 in)
- Listed weight: 96 kg (212 lb)

Career information
- Playing career: 1960–1982
- Position: Power forward / center
- Number: 6

Career history
- 1960–1961: Clube Espéria
- 1961–1969: Corinthians
- 1969–1972: Venezia
- 1972: Trianon Clube
- 1972–1973: Sírio
- 1973–1978: Palmeiras
- 1978–1982: São José dos Campos

Career highlights
- 2× South American Club Champion (1964, 1969); 5× Brazilian Champion (1965, 1966, 1969, 1977, 1981); 8× São Paulo State champion (1964–1966, 1968, 1969, 1974, 1980, 1981); FIBA's 50 Greatest Players (1991); FIBA Order of Merit (1994)
- Basketball Hall of Fame
- FIBA Hall of Fame
Medals
Representing Brazil
Men's basketball
Summer Olympic Games
Bronze medal – third place	1964 Tokyo	Team
FIBA World Cup
Gold medal – first place	1963 Brazil	Team
Silver medal – second place	1970 Yugoslavia	Team
Bronze medal – third place	1967 Uruguay	Team
Bronze medal – third place	1978 Philippines	Team
Pan American Games
Silver medal – second place	1963 São Paulo	Team
Bronze medal – third place	1975 Mexico City	Team
Bronze medal – third place	1979 San Juan	Team
FIBA South American Championship
Gold medal – first place	1963 Lima	Team
Gold medal – first place	1968 Asunción	Team
Gold medal – first place	1971 Montevideo	Team
Gold medal – first place	1973 Bogotá	Team
Gold medal – first place	1977 Valdivia	Team

Ubiratan "Bira" Pereira Maciel, commonly known as Bira Maciel, or simply Bira (January 18, 1944 – July 17, 2002), was a professional basketball player from Brazil. He was born in São Paulo, Brazil. At a height of 1.99 m (6 ft 6 1/2 in) tall, he played at the center position. He is often regarded as the best Brazilian center of all time. He was nicknamed "O Rei" (English: "The King").

== Club career ==
Maciel won the top-tier level club league in Brazil, the Brazilian Basketball Championship, 5 times, in the years 1965, 1966, 1969, 1977, and 1981.

== National team career ==
With the senior Brazilian national basketball team, Maciel won a total of 8 medals at the Summer Olympic Games, FIBA World Cup, and Pan American Games.

Ubiratan Pereira Maciel played at 5 FIBA World Cups: (1963, 1967, 1970, 1974, and 1978). He totaled 41 games played and 474 points scored during those competitions, and he won a gold medal at the 1963 tournament in Brazil.

== Post-playing career ==
Maciel was named one of FIBA's 50 Greatest Players in 1991. He was awarded the FIBA Order of Merit in 1994. In 2009, he was inducted into the FIBA Hall of Fame, as a player. On April 5, 2010, Maciel was announced as a member of the 2010 induction class of the Naismith Memorial Basketball Hall of Fame, as a player, and was formally inducted on August 13.
