= Paulinho Villas Boas =

Brazilian basketball player (born 1963)

Personal information
- Born: 26 January 1963 (age 63) São Paulo, Brazil
- Listed height: 7 ft 1 in (2.16 m)
- Listed weight: 235 lb (107 kg)
- Position: Center

Career highlights
- South American Club champion (1984); 4× Brazilian champion (1983, 1987, 1992, 1995)

Paulo "Paulinho" Villas Boas de Almeida, commonly known in Brazil as Paulinho Villas Boas (born 26 January 1963), is a Brazilian former professional basketball player.

== Career ==
During his pro club career, Villas Boas won 4 Brazilian Championships, in the years 1983, 1987, 1992, and 1995. With the senior men's Brazilian national basketball team, Villas Boas competed at the 1986 FIBA World Cup, the 1988 Summer Olympic Games, the 1992 Summer Olympic Games, and the 1994 FIBA World Cup.
