= 1999 McDonald's Championship =

- League: McDonald's Championship
- Sport: Basketball
- Duration: 14–16 October
- Top scorer: (United States) Charles Byrd (65 pts)
- Finals champions: (United States) San Antonio Spurs
- Runners-up: (Brazil) Vasco da Gama
- Finals MVP: (United States) Tim Duncan

McDonald's Championship seasons
- ← 1997 McDonald's Championship

The 1999 McDonald's Championship took place at the Fila Forum in Assago, near Milan, Italy. It was the final edition of the tournament.

== Participants ==
Continent	Teams	Clubs	
Europe	2	(Lithuania) Žalgiris	(Italy) Varese Roosters
Asia	1	(Lebanon) Sagesse/Hekmeh Club	
North America	1	(United States) San Antonio Spurs	
Oceania	1	(Australia) Adelaide 36ers	
South America	1	(Brazil) Vasco da Gama	

== Bracket ==
Premilinary round
October 14
(Italy) Varese Roosters	98
(Lebanon) Hekmeh	88
October 14
(Brazil) Vasco da Gama	90
(Australia) Adelaide 36ers	79

Semi-finals
October 15
(United States) San Antonio Spurs	96
(Italy) Varese Roosters	86
October 15
(Brazil) Vasco da Gama	92
(Lithuania) Žalgiris	86

Finals
October 16
(United States) San Antonio Spurs	103
(Brazil) Vasco da Gama	68
Third place
October 16
(Lithuania) Žalgiris	97
(Italy) Varese Roosters	78

Fifth place
October 16
(Australia) Adelaide 36ers	91
(Lebanon) Hekmeh	84

== Final standings ==
	Club	Record
	(United States) San Antonio Spurs	2–0
Silver medal	(Brazil) Vasco da Gama	2–1
Bronze medal	(Lithuania) Žalgiris	1-1
4.	(Italy) Varese Roosters	1–2
5.	(Australia) Adelaide 36ers	1-1
6.	(Lebanon) Hekmeh	0–2

1999 McDonald's Champions

San Antonio Spurs

== Sources ==
- Spurs rally
- Wilt will be remembered
- 1999 edition
- Part 3
