= Cláudio Mortari =

Brazilian basketball player and coach (1948–2025)

Personal information
- Born: March 15, 1948 São Paulo, Brazil
- Died: December 25, 2025 (aged 77)
- Coaching career: 1973–2021

Career history

Playing
- –1973: Palmeiras

Coaching
- 1980–1981: Brazil

Career highlights
- As head coach: FIBA Intercontinental Cup champion (1979); FIBA Americas League champion (2013); 3× South American Club Championship champion (1978, 1979, 1995); 5× Brazilian Championship champion (1977, 1978, 1979, 1983, 1995)

Cláudio Mortari (March 15, 1948 – December 25, 2025) was a Brazilian professional basketball player and coach.

== Playing career ==
Mortari played club basketball with the Brazilian club Palmeiras.

== Coaching career ==
Mortari coached numerous club teams, such as Palmeiras, Sírio and Pinheiros, and several other clubs. He won several championships in his coaching career. He was also the coach of the senior men's Brazilian national basketball team at the 1980 Summer Olympic Games.

== Death ==
Mortari died on December 25, 2025, at the age of 77.

== Awards and accomplishments ==
=== Coaching career ===
- 5× Brazilian Championship Champion: (1977, 1978, 1979, 1983, 1995)
- 3× South American Club Championship Champion: (1978, 1979, 1995)
- FIBA Intercontinental Cup Champion: (1979)
- FIBA Americas League Champion: (2013)
