= José Vargas (basketball) =

Dominican basketball player (born 1963)

Personal information
- Born: June 23, 1963 (age 63) La Romana, Dominican Republic
- Listed height: 2.08 m (6 ft 10 in)
- Listed weight: 102 kg (225 lb)

Career information
- College: LSU (1984–1988)
- NBA draft: 1988: 2nd round, 49th overall pick
- Drafted by: Dallas Mavericks
- Playing career: 1988–2006
- Position: Center

Career history
- 1988–1989: Phonola Roma
- 1990–1991: Saint-Quentin
- 1991–1993: Maccabi Tel Aviv
- 1993–1994: Cholet
- 1995–1996: Ambrosiana Milano
- 2005–2006: Franca

Career highlights
- FIBA South American League MVP (2000)
- Stats at Basketball Reference
Medals
Men's basketball
Representing the Dominican Republic
Pan American Games
Silver medal – second place	2003 Dominican Republic
Centrobasket
Silver medal – second place	2003 Mexico

José Luis Vargas (born June 23, 1963), commonly known as "El Grillo" and "Jose Grillo Vargas", is a Dominican former professional basketball player who played college basketball for the LSU Tigers.

== College career ==
Vargas played college basketball for Louisiana State University.

== Professional career ==
Vargas was drafted in the second round of the 1988 National Basketball Association draft by the Dallas Mavericks. He never played in the NBA, though, instead leaving to play in the Italian league.

He played for Maccabi Tel Aviv from 1991 to 1993.

He played with Club de Regatas Vasco da Gama.
