= Josuel dos Santos =

Brazilian basketball player (born 1970)

Personal information
- Born: 14 June 1970 (age 56) São Paulo, Brazil
- Listed height: 6 ft 10 in (2.08 m)
- Listed weight: 255 lb (116 kg)
- Position: Center

Career highlights
- 4× Brazilian champion (1993, 1995, 2002, 2005)

Aristides Josuel dos Santos (born 14 June 1970), commonly known as Josuel, is a Brazilian former professional basketball player.

== Career ==
During his pro club career, dos Santos won 4 Brazilian Championships, in the years 1993, 1995, 2002, and 2005.

With the senior Brazilian national basketball team, dos Santos competed at the men's basketball tournaments at the 1990 FIBA World Cup, the 1992 Summer Olympic Games, the 1994 FIBA World Cup, the 1996 Summer Olympic Games, and the 1998 FIBA World Cup.
