= Rogério Klafke =

Brazilian basketball player

Personal information
- Born: 26 March 1971 (age 55) Porto Alegre, Brazil
- Listed height: 6 ft 7 in (2.01 m)
- Listed weight: 223 lb (101 kg)
- Position: Small forward / power forward
- Number: 14

Career highlights
- 3× FIBA South American League champion (1999, 2000, 2005); 2× South American Club champion (1998, 1999); 5× Brazilian champion (1997, 1998, 2000, 2001, 2004); 2× Brazilian All-Star (2009, 2010)

Rogério Klafke, also known simply as Rogério (born 26 March 1971) is a Brazilian former professional basketball player. During his pro club career, Klafke won 5 Brazilian Championships, in the years 1997, 1998, 2000, 2001, and 2004. With the senior Brazilian national basketball team, Klafke competed at the 1994 FIBA World Cup, the 1996 Summer Olympics, the 1998 FIBA World Cup, and the 2002 FIBA World Cup.
