= Demétrius Conrado Ferraciú =

Brazilian basketball player

Personal information
- Born: 17 July 1973 (age 51); São Paulo, Brazil
- Listed height: 6 ft 4 in (1.93 m)
- Listed weight: 180 lb (82 kg)
- Position: Point guard / shooting guard

Career highlights
- As a player: 3× Pan American Club champion (1993, 1994, 1997); 2× FIBA South American League champion (1999, 2000); 3× South American Club Champion (1991, 1998, 1999); 6× Brazilian champion (1993, 1997, 1998, 2000, 2001, 2005); As a head coach: Brazilian champion (2017)

Demétrius Conrado Ferraciú, also commonly known simply as Demétrius (alternate spelling: Ferracciú) (born 17 July 1973) is a Brazilian former professional basketball player and coach.

== Career ==
During his pro club career, Demétrius won 6 Brazilian Championships, in the years 1993, 1997, 1998, 2000, 2001, and 2005. With the senior Brazilian national basketball team, Demétrius competed at the 1996 Summer Olympics, the 1998 FIBA World Cup, and the 2002 FIBA World Cup.

After he retired from playing professional basketball, Demétrius began a career working as a basketball coach.
