= 2016–17 Flamengo Basketball season =

Flamengo
2016–17 season
- Chairman: Eduardo Bandeira de Mello
- Head coach: José Alves Neto
- Arena: Ginásio Hélio Maurício (capacity: 1,000); Tijuca Tênis Clube (capacity: 4,500)
- Rio de Janeiro State Championship: Champion
- NBB: -
- FIBA Americas League: -
Home	Away

The 2016–17 season of Flamengo Basketball is the 97th season of the club, and the club's 9th in the Novo Basquete Brasil (NBB). They played the season as the defending champions of the league, holding four consecutive titles.

== Roster ==
Note: Flags indicate national team eligibility at FIBA-sanctioned events. Players may hold other non-FIBA nationalities not displayed.

Flamengo Basketball roster
Players
Coaches

Pos.	No.	Nat.	Name	Ht.	Wt.	Age
C	2	(United States)	Rollins, Hakeem	2.01 m (6 ft 7 in)	111 kg (245 lb)	41 – 4 June 1983
G/F	4	(Brazil)	Machado, Marcelinho (C)	2.00 m (6 ft 7 in)	88 kg (194 lb)	49 – 12 April 1975
G	5	(Brazil)	Fischer, Ricardo (injured)	1.83 m (6 ft 0 in)		33 – 16 May 1991
F	6	(Brazil)	Felipin	1.98 m (6 ft 6 in)		26 – 30 October 1998
G	7	(Brazil)	Rava, Pedrinho (injured)	1.83 m (6 ft 0 in)		29 – 8 September 1995
F	8	(Brazil)	Bernardo	1.88 m (6 ft 2 in)		26 – 17 September 1998
G/F	9	(Brazil)	Lelê (injured)	1.96 m (6 ft 5 in)		29 – 27 February 1996
G	10	(Dominican Republic)	Ramón, Ronald	1.83 m (6 ft 0 in)	84 kg (185 lb)	39 – 14 January 1986
F	11	(Brazil)	Marquinhos	2.07 m (6 ft 9 in)	102 kg (225 lb)	40 – 31 May 1984
F/C	12	(Brazil)	Mineiro, Rafael	2.08 m (6 ft 10 in)	107 kg (236 lb)	36 – 3 June 1988
F/C	13	(Brazil)	Batista, J.P.	2.06 m (6 ft 9 in)	122 kg (269 lb)	43 – 29 October 1981
F	14	(Brazil)	Amorim, Vitor	1.92 m (6 ft 4 in)		28 – 11 January 1997
F	16	(Brazil)	Olivinha	2.03 m (6 ft 8 in)	118 kg (260 lb)	41 – 18 April 1983
F	17	(Brazil)	Danilo	1.93 m (6 ft 4 in)		26 – 16 May 1998
C	18	(Brazil)	Otte, Emilio	1.97 m (6 ft 6 in)		27 – 30 April 1997
G	19	(Brazil)	Silva, Humberto (injured)	1.95 m (6 ft 5 in)		30 – 7 February 1995
F/C	20	(Brazil)	Bispo, Léo	2.05 m (6 ft 9 in)		28 – 2 October 1996
G	21	(Brazil)	Heitor	1.83 m (6 ft 0 in)		27 – 21 January 1998
F/C	25	(Brazil)	Iglesias, Jorge	2.05 m (6 ft 9 in)		29 – 26 April 1995
C	34	(Brazil)	João Vitor	2.13 m (7 ft 0 in)		26 – 15 December 1998

Head coach

- (Brazil) José Alves Neto

Assistant coach(es)

- (Brazil) Rodrigo Silva

Team manager

- (Brazil) Marcelo Vido

Legend

- (C) Team captain
- Injured

- Roster
Updated: 8 November 2016

=== Depth chart ===
Pos.	Starting 5	Bench 1	Bench 2	Bench 3	LDB Team
C	J.P. Batista	Hakeem Rollins	João Vitor		Otte
PF	Carlos Olivinha	Rafael Mineiro	Léo Bispo	Danilo	Iglesias
SF	Marquinhos Vieira	Marcelinho Machado	Felipin		Amorim
SG	Ronald Ramon	Humberto Silva	Lelê		Bernardo
PG	Ricardo Fischer	Pedrinho Rava			Heitor

== Transactions ==
=== In ===
No.	Pos.	Nat.	Name	Age	Moving from		Type	Ends	Transfer fee	Date	Source
20	PF	(Brazil)	Léo Bispo	20	Pinheiros	(Brazil)	Free agency	2017	–	26 July 2016	
19	SG	(Brazil)	Humberto Silva	21	Pinheiros	(Brazil)	Free agency	2017	–	7 July 2016	
5	PG	(Brazil)	Ricardo Fischer	25	Bauru	(Brazil)	Free agency	2017	–	7 July 2016	
9	SG	(Brazil)	Lelê	20	Southeastern Community College	(United States)	Free agency	2017	–	26 July 2016	
7	PG	(Brazil)	Pedrinho Rava	21	Macaé Basquete	(Brazil)	Free agency	2017	–	26 July 2016	
2	C	(United States)	Hakeem Rollins	33	Free agent		Free agency	2017	–	12 January 2017	

=== Out ===
No.	Pos.	Nat.	Name	Age	Moving to		Type	Transfer fee	Date	Source
55	PG	(Brazil)	Rafa Luz	24	Saski Baskonia	(Spain)	Free agency	–	5 July 2016	
24	SG	(United States)	Jason Robinson	36	Retired		-	–	5 July 2016	
19	PG	(Brazil)	Gegê	25	Rio Claro Basquete	(Brazil)	Free agency	–	6 July 2016	
55	C	(United States)	Jerome Meyinsse	27	San Lorenzo	(Argentina)	Free agency	–	6 July 2016	
15	PG	(Brazil)	Danielzinho	25	Minas Storm	(Brazil)	Free agency	–	8 July 2016	

== Pre-season games ==
=== Super Four Rio-Nordeste Tournament ===
Pos	Team	Pld	W	L	PF	PA	PD	Pts	Qualification or relegation
1	Vasco da Gama	3	2	1	226	218	+8	5	Champions
2	Flamengo	3	2	1	247	217	+30	5	-
3	Solar Basquete Cearense	3	1	2	211	227	−16	4	-
4	Universo Vitória	3	1	2	204	208	−4	4	-

Source: Basquete Cearense

September 25, 2016	Flamengo	80–84OT	Vasco da Gama*	Ginásio do CFO, Fortaleza
14:00 UTC−03:00	Scoring by quarter: 15–27, 11–6, 24–18, 25–24, Overtime: 5–9
SporTV	Pts: J.P. Batista 22; Rebs: Olivinha 9 Asts: -	Report	Pts: David Jackson 17; Rebs: Fiorotto 10; Asts: David Jackson 6

September 26, 2016	Universo Vitória	52–76	Flamengo	Ginásio do CFO, Fortaleza
17:00 UTC−03:00	Scoring by quarter: 21–14, 9–17, 7–28, 15–17
SporTV	Pts: Douglas Kurtz 10; Rebs: Douglas Kurtz 8 Asts: -	Report	Pts: Marcelinho 13; Rebs: Olivinha 10; Asts: -

September 26, 2016	Solar Basquete Cearense	81–91	Flamengo	Ginásio do CFO, Fortaleza
19:00 UTC−03:00	Scoring by quarter: 20–20, 24–29, 21–17, 15–26
SporTV	Pts: Marcus Toledo 16; Rebs: - Asts: -	Report	Pts: Marcelinho 20; Rebs: - Asts: -

* First basketball game between the two rivals in 9 years

== Competitions ==
=== Rio de Janeiro State Championship ===
==== Regular season standings ====
Pos	Team	Pld	W	L	PF	PA	PD	Pts	Qualification or relegation
1	Flamengo	6	5	1	510	424	+86	11	Semifinals Playoffs
2	Vasco da Gama	6	5	1	492	445	+47	11	Semifinals Playoffs
3	Macaé	6	2	4	423	458	−35	8	Semifinals Playoffs
4	Botafogo	5	0	5	387	485	−98	5	Semifinals Playoffs

Source: FBERJ

==== Regular season games ====
September 22, 2016	Flamengo	78–59	Macaé	Ginásio Hélio Maurício, Rio de Janeiro
	Scoring by quarter: 26–12, 11–12, 30–13, 11–22
	Pts: Marcelinho 17; Rebs: J.P. Batista 5 Asts: Marcelinho 5	Report	Pts: Thiaguinho 14; Rebs: - Asts: -

September 30, 2016	Botafogo	57–79	Flamengo	Tijuca Tênis Clube, Rio de Janeiro
	Scoring by quarter: 12– 29, 12–12, 16–16, 17–22
	Pts: Wesley Russel 16; Rebs: - Asts: -	Report	Pts: J.P. Batista 25; Rebs: J.P. Batista 10; Asts: -

October 3, 2016	Flamengo	77–82	Vasco da Gama*	Tijuca Tênis Clube, Rio de Janeiro
	Scoring by quarter: 25– 18, 19–15, 10–17, 23–32
	Pts: Ronald Ramon, Marquinhos, Ricardo Fischer 14; Rebs: Olivinha 9 Asts: -	Report	Pts: Fiorotto, Nezinho 19; Rebs: - Asts: David Jackson 7

October 6, 2016	Macaé	71–91	Flamengo	Ginásio Juquinha, Macaé
	Scoring by quarter: 23– 14, 19–25, 12–27, 17–25
	Pts: - Rebs: - Asts: -	Report	Pts: Marquinhos 28; Rebs: - Asts: Ricardo Fischer 7

October 11, 2016	Flamengo	92–70	Botafogo	Tijuca Tênis Clube, Rio de Janeiro
	Scoring by quarter: 25–13, 26–9, 21–21, 20–27
	Pts: Marcelinho 20; Rebs: - Asts: -	Report	Pts: Abner 17; Rebs: - Asts: -

October 14, 2016	Vasco da Gama	85–93	Flamengo	Tijuca Tênis Clube, Rio de Janeiro
	Scoring by quarter: 20– 26, 17–23, 19–26, 29–18
	Pts: Drudi 24; Rebs: Drudi 8 Asts: Hélio 6	Report	Pts: Olivinha 24; Rebs: Olivinha 7 Asts: Olivinha 5

* First official basketball game between the two rivals in 9 years

==== Semifinals ====
===== (1) Flamengo vs. (4) Botafogo =====
Game 1

October 17, 2016
20:00 UTC−03:00

Report

Flamengo	79–69	Botafogo
Scoring by quarter: 15–18, 15–14, 28–15, 21–22
Pts: Marquinhos 19; Rebs: Marquinhos 7 Asts: Marquinhos 4		Pts: Feliz 14; Rebs: - Asts: -

Tijuca Tênis Clube, Rio de Janeiro

Game 2

October 19, 2016
20:00 UTC−03:00

Report

Botafogo	81–89	Flamengo
Scoring by quarter: 22–23, 22–22, 18–18, 19–26
Pts: Wesley Russel 16; Rebs: - Asts: -		Pts: J.P. Batista 21; Rebs: Olivinha 11; Asts: -
Flamengo wins series, 2–0

General Severiano, Rio de Janeiro

==== Finals ====
===== (1) Flamengo vs. (2) Vasco da Gama =====
Game 1

SporTV

October 24, 2016
21:00 UTC−03:00

Report

Flamengo	89–87	Vasco da Gama
Scoring by quarter: 23–25, 21–20, 20–19, 25–23
Pts: Marcelinho 31; Rebs: - Asts: -		Pts: Murilo 24; Rebs: - Asts: Hélio 5

Ginásio Hélio Maurício, Rio de Janeiro
Attendance: 0 (Closed to the public)

Game 2

Globo Esporte

October 24, 2016
20:00 UTC−03:00

Report

Vasco da Gama	104–98	Flamengo
Scoring by quarter: 17–26, 30–18, 29–31, 28–23
Pts: Hélio 36; Rebs: - Asts: David Jackson 3		Pts: Marcelinho 27; Rebs: - Asts: -

Ginásio Vasco da Gama, Rio de Janeiro
Attendance: 0 (Closed to the public)

Game 3

SporTV

December 6, 2016
21:00 UTC−03:00

Report

Flamengo	20–0	Vasco da Gama (forfeit)
Scoring by quarter: -, -, -, -
Pts: - Rebs: - Asts: -		Pts: - Rebs: - Asts: -
Flamengo wins series, 2–1

Tijuca Tênis Clube, Rio de Janeiro

=== 2016-17 NBB ===
==== Regular season standings ====
Pos	Team	Pld	W	L	PF	PA	PD	Pts	Qualification or relegation
1	Flamengo	28	21	7	2464	2195	+269	49	Quarterfinals Playoffs
2	Mogi das Cruzes	28	20	8	2273	2088	+185	48	Quarterfinals Playoffs
3	Franca	28	19	9	2256	2199	+57	47	Quarterfinals Playoffs
4	Brasília	28	19	9	2285	2155	+130	47	Quarterfinals Playoffs
5	Bauru Basket	28	18	10	2256	2086	+170	46	First Round Playoffs
6	Paulistano	28	16	12	2287	2146	+141	44	First Round Playoffs
7	Vitória	28	16	12	2130	2105	+25	44	First Round Playoffs
8	Pinheiros	28	16	12	2275	2250	+25	44	First Round Playoffs
9	Vasco da Gama	28	14	14	2099	2182	−83	42	First Round Playoffs
10	Campo Mourão	28	13	15	2140	2226	−86	41	First Round Playoffs
11	Basquete Cearense	28	12	16	2116	2184	−68	40	First Round Playoffs
12	Macaé	28	8	20	2117	2212	−95	36	First Round Playoffs
13	Minas Tênis Clube	28	7	21	2146	2332	−186	35	
14	Liga Sorocabana	28	6	22	1921	2159	−238	34	Relegation to Liga Ouro
15	Caxias do Sul	28	5	23	2022	2269	−247	33	Relegation to Liga Ouro

Source: LNB – NBB

==== Regular season games ====
November 5, 2016	Bauru Basket	97–100OT	Flamengo	Ginásio Panela de Pressão, Bauru
14:00 UTC−03:00	Scoring by quarter: 17–12, 16–19, 25–30, 18–15, Overtime: 21–24
Band, SporTV	Pts: Alex 30; Rebs: Hettsheimeir 9 Asts: Alex, Meindl, Gegê 5	Box Score	Pts: Batista 29; Rebs: Olivinha 16; Asts: Ramón 7	Referees: Fernando Serpa, Marcos Antônio Ferreira, Gustavo Mathias

November 8, 2016	Franca	84–85	Flamengo	Pedrocão, Franca
19:30 UTC−03:00	Scoring by quarter: 15–21, 15–18, 23–24, 31–22
SporTV	Pts: Pedro 19; Rebs: Cipolini 6 Asts: Alexey 4	Box Score	Pts: Marcelinho 25; Rebs: Olivinha 9 Asts: Ramón 6	Referees: Marcos Benito, Maria Claudia Comodaro, Gregorio Lelis

November 17, 2016	Flamengo	96–88	Pinheiros	Tijuca Tênis Clube, Rio de Janeiro
21:00 UTC−03:00	Scoring by quarter: 28–24, 21–10, 16–24, 31–30
	Pts: Marcelinho 22; Rebs: Olivinha 12; Asts: Marquinhos 4	Box Score	Pts: Holloway 22; Rebs: Holloway 7 Asts: Holloway 5	Attendance: 462; Referees: Jonas Pereira, Leandro Sehnen, Ramiro Inchauspe

November 24, 2016	Campo Mourão	69–90	Flamengo	Ginásio Belin Carolo, Campo Mourão
20:15 UTC−03:00
	Pts: Betinho 20; Rebs: Cauê 8 Asts: Betinho 5	Box Score	Pts: Marcelinho 30; Rebs: Olivinha 14; Asts: Ricardo Fischer 8	Attendance: 3.560; Referees: Marcos Benito, Diego Chiconato, Cauan Santos

December 1, 2016	Flamengo	81–74	Liga Sorocabana	Tijuca Tênis Clube, Rio de Janeiro
20:00 UTC−03:00	Scoring by quarter: 19–19, 21–14, 20–19, 21–22
	Pts: J.P. Batista 22; Rebs: Olivinha 8 Asts: Marcelinho Machado 6	Box Score	Pts: Ted 18; Rebs: Ted 9 Asts: Cafferata 5	Referees: Jonas Pereira, Leandro Sehnen, Ramiro Inchauspe

December 3, 2016	Flamengo	81–72	Paulistano	Tijuca Tênis Clube, Rio de Janeiro
14:00 UTC−03:00	Scoring by quarter: 20–13, 16–13, 25–24, 20–22
Band	Pts: Marquinhos 19; Rebs: Olivinha 14; Asts: Ricardo Fischer 6	Box Score	Pts: Mogi 17; Rebs: Georginho 9 Asts: Georginho 8

December 10, 2016	Flamengo	85–66	Macaé	Tijuca Tênis Clube, Rio de Janeiro
18:00 UTC−03:00	Scoring by quarter: 22–13, 14–20, 27–23, 22–10
Facebook Live	Pts: Marquinhos 23; Rebs: Olivinha 8 Asts: Ricardo Fischer 5	Box Score	Pts: Simmons 17; Rebs: Simmons 8 Asts: Thiaguinho 4	Referees: Jonas Pereira, Davi de Souza, Vinicius da Silva

December 14, 2016	Caxias do Sul	80–104	Flamengo	Ginásio Vasco da Gama, Caxias do Sul
20:05 UTC−03:00	Scoring by quarter: 21–23, 17–20, 22–34, 20–27
	Pts: Arthur 21; Rebs: Stabile 6 Asts: Fred 3	Score	Pts: Marquinhos 26; Rebs: Olivinha 10; Asts: Ronald Ramon 6	Referees: Marcos Ferreira, Fabiano Huber, Fabiola Carraro

=== Season records ===
Competition	Regular season				Playoffs				Totals			
Competition	G	W	L	PCT	G	W	L	PCT	G	W	L	PCT
Rio de Janeiro State Championship	6	5	1	.833	5	4	1	.800	11	9	2	.818
NBB	28	21	7	.750	4	2	2	.500	32	23	9	.719
Totals	34	26	8	.765	9	6	3	.667	43	32	11	.744
