= 2017–18 Flamengo Basketball season =

Flamengo Basketball Club

Flamengo
2017–18 season
- Chairman: Eduardo Bandeira de Mello
- Head coach: José Alves Neto
- Arena: Tijuca Tênis Clube (capacity: 3,000); Arena Carioca 1 (capacity: 5,000)
- NBB: Semifinals (lost to Mogi 1-3)
- FIBA Liga Sudamericana: Second Round
- Scoring leader: Marquinhos (18.6 ppg)
Home	Away

The 2017–18 season of Flamengo Basketball is the 98th season of the club, and the club's 10th in the Novo Basquete Brasil (NBB). They played the season coming from their tied worst result in league history (5th place), after four consecutive titles on the previous years. The club captain Marcelinho Machado retired at the end of the season.

== Roster ==
Note: Flags indicate national team eligibility at FIBA-sanctioned events. Players may hold other non-FIBA nationalities not displayed.

Flamengo Basketball roster
Players
Coaches

Pos.	No.	Nat.	Name	Ht.	Wt.	Age
C	0	(United States)	Rhett, M. J.	2.06 m (6 ft 9 in)	107 kg (236 lb)	33 – 15 November 1992
G	3	(Brazil)	Mogi, Wesley	1.96 m (6 ft 5 in)	90 kg (198 lb)	29 – 30 June 1996
G/F	4	(Brazil)	Machado, Marcelinho (C)	2.00 m (6 ft 7 in)	88 kg (194 lb)	50 – 12 April 1975
F/C	5	(Brazil)	Pilar, Henrique	1.98 m (6 ft 6 in)	98 kg (216 lb)	41 – 14 February 1984
G	8	(Venezuela)	Cubillán, David	1.83 m (6 ft 0 in)	79 kg (174 lb)	38 – 27 July 1987
F	11	(Brazil)	Marquinhos	2.07 m (6 ft 9 in)	102 kg (225 lb)	41 – 31 May 1984
F/C	13	(Brazil)	Batista, J. P.	2.06 m (6 ft 9 in)	122 kg (269 lb)	44 – 29 October 1981
G	14	(Dominican Republic)	Ramón, Ronald	1.83 m (6 ft 0 in)	84 kg (185 lb)	39 – 14 January 1986
F	16	(Brazil)	Olivinha	2.03 m (6 ft 8 in)	118 kg (260 lb)	42 – 18 April 1983
F/C	17	(Brazil)	Varejão, Anderson	2.11 m (6 ft 11 in)	124 kg (273 lb)	43 – 28 September 1982
G	23	(Brazil)	Pecos, Arthur	1.84 m (6 ft 0 in)	80 kg (176 lb)	31 – 1 November 1994
F	28	(Brazil)	Amorim, Vitor	1.92 m (6 ft 4 in)	92 kg (203 lb)	28 – 11 January 1997
C	34	(Brazil)	França, João Vitor	2.13 m (7 ft 0 in)	120 kg (265 lb)	26 – 15 December 1998

Head coach

- (Brazil) José Alves Neto

Assistant coach(es)

- (Brazil) Rodrigo Silva

Team manager

- (Brazil) Marcelo Vido

Legend

- (C) Team captain
- Injured

- Roster
Updated: 9 March 2018

=== Depth chart ===
Pos.	Starting 5	Bench 1	Bench 2	LDB Team
C	J. P. Batista	Anderson Varejão	João Vitor	Otte
PF	Olivinha	M. J. Rhett	Henrique Pilar	Iglesias
SF	Marquinhos	Marcelinho Machado		Amorim
SG	Ronald Ramon	Wesley Mogi		Bernardo
PG	David Cubillan	Arthur Pecos		Heitor

== Transactions ==
=== In ===
No.	Pos.	Nat.	Name	Age	Moving from		Type	Ends	Transfer fee	Date	Source
23	SG	(Brazil)	Arthur Pecos	22	Paulistano	(Brazil)	Free agency	2018	–	5 July 2017	
8	PG	(Venezuela)	David Cubillan	30	Trotamundos de Carabobo	(Venezuela)	Free agency	2018	–	6 July 2017	
0	PF	(United States)	M.J. Rhett	24	Cholet Basket	(France)	Free agency	2018	–	14 August 2017	
17	PF	(Brazil)	Anderson Varejão	35	Free agent		Free transfer	2019	Free	18 January 2018	

=== Out ===
No.	Pos.	Nat.	Name	Age	Moving to		Type	Transfer fee	Date	Source
5	PG	(Brazil)	Ricardo Fischer	26	Bilbao Basket	(Spain)	Free agency	–	5 July 2017	
17	SG	(Brazil)	Danilo Monteiro	19	Brasília Búfalos	(Brazil)	Free transfer	Free	5 March 2018	
19	SG	(Brazil)	Humberto Silva	23	Corinthians	(Brazil)	Transfer	–	5 March 2018	

== Player statistics ==
=== NBB regular season ===
#	Player	GP	GS	MPG	2FG%	3FG%	FT%	RPG	APG	SPG	BPG	TO	PPG	EFF
0	(United States) M. J. Rhett	25	-	13.9	.548	.375	.633	2.9	.3	.3	.4	.7	5.9	6.4
3	(Brazil) Wesley Mogi	10	-	2.4	.000	.000	.000	.3	.0	.1	.0	.3	.0	-0.2
4	(Brazil) Marcelinho Machado	24	-	18.7	.564	.389	.857	2.6	2.9	.3	.1	1.0	8.0	9.5
5	(Brazil) Henrique Pilar	27	-	7.9	.486	.393	.545	1.4	.3	.7	.1	.4	2.8	3.4
8	(Venezuela) David Cubillán	27	-	25.3	.461	.411	.743	1.9	3.0	.6	.0	1.2	9.4	9.1
11	(Brazil) Marquinhos	28	-	28.6	.636	.371	.790	3.8	3.2	.8	.2	1.5	18.6	18.2
13	(Brazil) J. P. Batista	28	-	25.2	.563	.000	.649	6.3	2.9	.7	.4	1.9	12.6	15.8
14	(Dominican Republic) Ronald Ramón	28	-	28.2	.478	.339	.915	2.1	2.3	.6	.1	.9	8.6	8.6
16	(Brazil) Olivinha	28	-	19.2	.589	.246	.800	6.4	.9	.6	.1	1.1	8.8	11.6
17	(Brazil) Danilo Monteiro	1	-	1.0	.000	.000	.000	.0	.0	.0	.0	.0	.0	.0
17	(Brazil) Anderson Varejão	13	-	20.9	.517	.500	.756	7.6	2.0	.6	.8	1.3	9.5	15.2
19	(Brazil) Humberto Silva	10	-	8.5	.364	.333	1.000	.8	.6	.6	.1	.5	1.9	2.2
23	(Brazil) Arthur Pecos	28	-	20.1	.447	.273	.723	2.6	3.1	.9	.0	1.4	5.5	7.3
28	(Brazil) Vitor Amorim	1	-	1.0	.000	.000	.000	.0	.0	.0	.0	.0	.0	.0
34	(Brazil) João Vitor França	19	-	5.5	.682	.000	.600	2.0	.3	.1	.2	.3	2.1	3.6

Players in italic left the team during the season.
Updated: 9 March 2018

== Competitions ==
=== 2017-18 NBB ===
==== Matches ====
Win Loss

14 November 2017 1	Paulistano/Corpore	72–67	Flamengo	São Paulo
19:30 (Brasília Time)	Scoring by quarter: 21–15, 9– 14, 26-13, 16-25
	Pts: Nesbitt 13; Rebs: Du Sommer 7 Asts: Elinho 9	Boxscore	Pts: Cubillan 14; Rebs: J. P. Batista 8 Asts: J. P. Batista 6	Arena: Ginásio Antônio Prado Junior; Attendance: 750; Referees: Cristiano Jesus Maranho, Eduardo Albano, Cauan Santos

16 November 2017 2	Campo Mourão	82–89	Flamengo	Campo Mourão
20:15 (Brasília Time)	Scoring by quarter: 18-24, 21-18, 20-24, 23-23
	Pts: Greg Brown 22; Rebs: Mathias 8 Asts: Greg Brown 6	Boxscore	Pts: J. P. Batista 30; Rebs: J. P. Batista 15; Asts: J. P. Batista 5	Arena: Ginásio Belin Carolo; Attendance: 1.178; Referees: Jonas De Carlo Pereira, José Pelissari, Gustavo Mathias

30 November 2017 3	Flamengo	79–69	Caxias	Rio de Janeiro
19:30 (Brasília Time)	Scoring by quarter: 22-19, 17-11, 20-17, 20-22
	Pts: J. P. Batista 16; Rebs: J. P. Batista 7 Asts: Marcelinho 6	Boxscore	Pts: Marcão 30; Rebs: Cauê Borges 8 Asts: Cauê Borges 5	Arena: Tijuca; Attendance: 325; Referees: Jonas De Carlo Pereira, Maria Moraes, Davi Fidelis

2 December 2017 4	Flamengo	86–75	Joinville/AABJ	Rio de Janeiro
18:00 (Brasília Time)	Scoring by quarter: 24-27, 18-12, 26-13, 18-23
	Pts: Marquinhos 17; Rebs: J. P. Batista 8 Asts: Arthur Pecos 5	Boxscore	Pts: Stocks 20; Rebs: Bambu 6 Asts: Stocks, Vezaro 2	Arena: Tijuca; Attendance: 411; Referees: José Carlos Pelissari, Andreia da Silva, Davi de Souza

15 December 2017 5	Minas	82–83	Flamengo	Belo Horizonte
19:45 (Brasília Time)	Scoring by quarter: 16-14, 16-27, 17-22, 27-20
	Pts: Roquemore 19; Rebs: Teichmann 13; Asts: Gegê 10	Boxscore	Pts: Marquinhos 19; Rebs: Olivinha 10; Asts: Arthur Pecos 5	Arena: Arena Minas T.C. Attendance: 1.237; Referees: Jonas De Carlo Pereira, Diego Chiconato, Luiz Felipe Silva
