= 2019–20 Flamengo Basketball season =

Flamengo
2019–20 season
- Chairman: Rodolfo Landim
- Head coach: Gustavo de Conti
- Arena: Ginásio Hélio Maurício (capacity: 1,000); Tijuca Tênis Clube (capacity: 4,500); Ginásio da ASCEB (capacity: 3,050)
- Campeonato Carioca: Champions (win Botafogo)
- NBB: 1st (no playoffs)
- Champions League: finals
Home	Away

The 2019–20 season was the 100th season of Flamengo Basketball and the club's 12th in the Novo Basquete Brasil (NBB). This was the inaugural season of the Basketball Champions League Americas, FIBA Americas League successor. The NBB season was cut short due to the COVID-19 pandemic, ending shortly before the end of the regular season, with no playoffs and consequently, no champions declared.

== Roster ==
Note: Flags indicate national team eligibility at FIBA-sanctioned events. Players may hold other non-FIBA nationalities not displayed.

Flamengo Basketball roster
Players
Coaches

Pos.	No.	Nat.	Name	Ht.	Wt.	Age
SF	1	(Brazil)	Nunes, Pedro	1.99 m (6 ft 6 in)	98 kg (216 lb)	24 – 23 August 2000
PG	6	(Argentina)	Balbi, Franco	1.88 m (6 ft 2 in)	85 kg (187 lb)	35 – 21 August 1989
F	7	(Brazil)	Luz, Jhonatan	1.96 m (6 ft 5 in)	92 kg (203 lb)	37 – 2 October 1987
PF	8	(Brazil)	Miranda, Ruan	2.05 m (6 ft 9 in)	107 kg (236 lb)	23 – 7 July 2001
CG	9	(Brazil)	Ramos, Deryk	1.88 m (6 ft 2 in)	80 kg (176 lb)	30 – 14 June 1994
PG	10	(Brazil)	Matheusinho	1.84 m (6 ft 0 in)	78 kg (172 lb)	25 – 3 January 2000
G/F	11	(Brazil)	Marquinhos (C)	2.07 m (6 ft 9 in)	102 kg (225 lb)	40 – 31 May 1984
F/C	12	(Brazil)	Mineiro, Rafael	2.05 m (6 ft 9 in)	108 kg (238 lb)	36 – 3 June 1988
SF	15	(Brazil)	Weber, Matheus	1.95 m (6 ft 5 in)	95 kg (209 lb)	25 – 29 February 2000
PF	16	(Brazil)	Olivinha (C)	2.03 m (6 ft 8 in)	100 kg (220 lb)	41 – 18 April 1983
PF	20	(Brazil)	Rachel, Rafael	2.04 m (6 ft 8 in)	100 kg (220 lb)	25 – 20 March 2000
SF	24	(Brazil)	Machado, Gabriel	1.95 m (6 ft 5 in)	89 kg (196 lb)	22 – 16 June 2002
G/F	32	(United States)	Graham, Zach	1.96 m (6 ft 5 in)	89 kg (196 lb)	35 – 28 March 1989
C	33	(Dominican Republic)	Vargas, Eloy	2.11 m (6 ft 11 in)	120 kg (265 lb)	36 – 30 December 1988
C	34	(Brazil)	Maciel, Matheus	2.06 m (6 ft 9 in)	98 kg (216 lb)	24 – 11 January 2001
CG	55	(Uruguay)	Barrera, Panchi	1.94 m (6 ft 4 in)	85 kg (187 lb)	39 – 6 April 1985
PF/C	71	(Brazil)	Demétrio, Léo	2.08 m (6 ft 10 in)	105 kg (231 lb)	30 – 24 March 1994

Head coach

- (Brazil) Gustavo de Conti

Assistant coach(es)

Team manager

- (Brazil) Marcelo Vido
- (Brazil) Diego Jeleilate

Legend

- (C) Team captain
- Injured

- Roster
Updated: 21 May 2020

=== Depth chart ===
Pos.	Starting 5	Bench 1	Bench	Bench
C	Vargas	Olivinha	Léo Demétrio	Maciel
PF	Mineiro	Jhonatan	Ruan	Rafael Rachel
SF	Marquinhos	Pedro Nunes	Matheus Weber	Gabriel
SG	Zach Graham	Deryk
PG	Balbi	Barrera	Matheusinho

=== Technical staff ===
Position	Staff
General manager	Diego Jeleilate
Supervisor	André Guimarães
Head coach	Gustavo de Conti
Assistant coach	Fernando Pereira
Fitness trainer	Bruno Nicolaci; Rafael Bernardelli
Physioterapist	Ricardo Machado

== Transactions ==
=== In ===
No.	Pos.	Nat.	Name	Age	Moving from		Type	Ends	Transfer fee	Date	Source
5	PF	(United States)	Leron Black	23	Argentino de Junín	(Argentina)	Free agency	2020	–	3 July 2019	
32	SG	(United States)	Zach Graham	30	Aguada	(Uruguay)	Free agency	2020	–	8 July 2019	
1	SF	(Brazil)	Pedro Nunes	19	IMG Academy	(United States)	Free agency	2021	–	9 July 2019	
34	C	(Brazil)	Matheus Maciel	18	Unicaja	(Spain)	Free agency	2020	–	9 July 2019	
71	PF	(Brazil)	Léo Demétrio	25	Bilbao Basket	(Spain)	Free agency	2020	–	23 July 2019	
33	C	(Dominican Republic)	Eloy Vargas	30	Metros de Santiago	(Dominican Republic)	Free agency	2020	–	2 November 2019	
55	PG	(Uruguay)	Panchi Barrera	34	Astros de Jalisco	(Mexico)	Free agency	2020	–	17 December 2019	

=== Out ===
No.	Pos.	Nat.	Name	Age	Moving to		Type	Transfer fee	Date	Source
8	SG	(United States)	Kevin Crescenzi	26	Sendi/Bauru Basket	(Brazil)	End of contract	-	24 June 2019	
25	PF	(The Bahamas)	David Nesbitt	27	Corinthians	(Brazil)	End of contract	-	24 June 2019	
5	PG	(Brazil)	Davi Rossetto	26	Minas	(Brazil)	End of contract	-	2 July 2019	
17	C	(Brazil)	Anderson Varejão	36	-		End of contract	-	30 September 2019	
5	PF	(United States)	Leron Black	23	Minas	(Brazil)	Released	-	17 December 2019	

== Pre-season and friendlies ==
=== NBA G League International Challenge ===
==== Group A ====
Pos	Team	Pld	W	L	PF	PA	PD	Qualification or relegation
1	(Germany) Bayern Munich	2	2	0	160	144	+16	Qualification to playoffs
2	(Brazil) Flamengo	2	1	1	143	147	−4	Qualification to playoffs
3	(Argentina) San Lorenzo	2	0	2	139	151	−12	

==== Matches ====
Win Loss

18 September 2019 1	Bayern Munich (Germany)	80–72	(Brazil) Flamengo	Montevideo, Uruguay
18:30 UTC−03:00	Scoring by quarter: 16-15, 18-17, 24-21, 22-19
	Pts: Đedović 17; Rebs: Zipser, Radošević 6 Asts: Koponen, Zipser, Nelson 3 Eff: Đedović 15	Boxscore	Pts: Graham 19; Rebs: Balbi, Leron Black, Léo Demétrio 3 Asts: Balbi 5 Eff: Marquinhos 15	Arena: Antel Arena; Referees: Andres Maina, Gabriel Leal, Felipe Burgo

20 September 2019 2	Flamengo (Brazil)	78–67	(Argentina) San Lorenzo	Montevideo, Uruguay
18:30 UTC−03:00	Scoring by quarter: 10-17, 22-12, 18-23, 21-15
		Boxscore		Arena: Antel Arena; Referees: Andres Maina, Carlos Ortega, Felipe Burgo

==== Playoffs ====
===== Semifinal =====
21 September 2019	NBA G League Elite Team (United States)	87–83	(Brazil) Flamengo	Montevideo, Uruguay
20:45 UTC−03:00	Scoring by quarter: 14-14, 27-19, 19-33, 27-17
	Pts: Hannahs 19; Rebs: Brown 13; Asts: Gaddy, Notice, Ashley 2 Eff: Ashley 19	Boxscore	Pts: Marquinhos 23; Rebs: Balbi, Mineiro 8 Asts: Balbi 6 Eff: Marquinhos 22	Arena: Antel Arena; Referees: Andres Maina, Carlos Ortega, Gabriel Leal

===== 3rd Place =====
22 September 2019	Uruguay Elite Team	89–81	(Brazil) Flamengo	Montevideo, Uruguay
16:00 UTC−03:00	Scoring by quarter: 20-26, 24-27, 21-19, 24-9
	Pts: Moglia 21; Rebs: Vescovi 9 Asts: Wachsmann 5 Eff: Vescovi 26	Boxscore	Pts: Léo Demétrio 19; Rebs: Olivinha 10; Asts: Balbi 5 Eff: Léo Demétrio 21	Arena: Antel Arena; Referees: Leonardo Zalazar, Felipe Burgo, Gabriel Leal

== Competitions ==
=== 2019 Campeonato Carioca ===
==== League table ====
Pos	Team	Pld	W	L	PF	PA	PD	Qualification or relegation
1	Flamengo	4	3	1	359	293	+66	Qualification to the final
2	Botafogo	4	3	1	354	289	+65	Qualification to the final
3	ABIG/Niterói Caciques	4	0	4	220	351	−131	

==== Results summary ====
Round	1	2	3	4
Ground	A	A	H	H
Result	W	L	W	W
Position	1	2	2	1

Last updated: May 5, 2020.
Source: Competitive matches
Ground: A = Away; H = Home; R = Rest. Result: L = Loss; W = Win; R = Rest; P = Postponed.

==== Results by round ====
Overall						Home					Away				
Pld	W	L	PF	PA	PD	W	L	PF	PA	PD	W	L	PF	PA	PD
4	3	1	357	293	+64	2	0	166	139	+27	1	1	191	154	+37

Last updated: May 5, 2020.
Source: Competitive matches

==== Matches ====
Win Loss

31 August 2019 1	ABIG/Niterói Caciques	54–93	Flamengo	Niterói, Brazil
18:30 UTC−03:00	Scoring by quarter: 12-21, 16-30, 12-28, 14-14
	Pts: Rodrigo Bahia 10; Rebs: Rodrigo Bahia 13; Asts: Thiago Brani, Higor Lima 3 Eff: Rodrigo Bahia 17	Boxscore	Pts: Olivinha 24; Rebs: Mineiro 11; Asts: Deryk 6 Eff: Mineiro 31	Arena: Ginásio La Salle; Attendance: 216; Referees: Maurício Serour, Felipe Braga, Carlos Heli

6 September 2019 2	Botafogo	100–98	Flamengo	Rio de Janeiro, Brazil
20:00 UTC−03:00	Scoring by quarter: 24-22, 22-22, 31-20, 23-34
	Pts: Cauê Borges 22; Rebs: Cauê Borges, Diego Conceição 7 Asts: Coelho 6 Eff: Cauê Borges 27	Boxscore	Pts: Olivinha 25; Rebs: Olivinha 7 Asts: Mineiro 6 Eff: Olivinha 27	Arena: Ginásio Oscar Zelaya; Referees: Felipe Braga, Gabriel Alves, Marco Aurélio

11 September 2019 3	Flamengo	80–63	ABIG/Niterói Caciques	Rio de Janeiro, Brazil
20:00 UTC−03:00	Scoring by quarter: 30-19, 21-19, 12-16, 17-9
	Pts: Leron Black 14; Rebs: Leron Black 8 Asts: Pedro Nunes 6 Eff: Leron Black 17	Boxscore	Pts: Gabriel Imbuzeiro 13; Rebs: Mingau 7 Asts: Rodrigo Bahia, Higor Lima, Mingau 3 Eff: Rodrigo Bahia 13	Arena: Ginásio Hélio Maurício; Referees: Maurício Serour, Ana Carolina Zachi, Lucas Maia

13 September 2019 4	Flamengo	88–76	Botafogo	Rio de Janeiro, Brazil
20:00 UTC−03:00	Scoring by quarter: 18-17, 25-13, 19-26, 26-20
	Pts: Balbi 22; Rebs: Balbi 5 Asts: Balbi 9 Eff: Balbi 32	Boxscore	Pts: Coelho, Cauê Borges 18; Rebs: Lucas Mariano 6 Asts: Cauê Borges 5 Eff: Cauê Borges 19	Arena: Ginásio Álvaro Vieira Lima; Attendance: 300; Referees: Maurício Serour, César Augusto Lopes, Wallace Pacifico

==== Results overview ====
Win Loss

Opposition	Home score	Away score	Double
ABIG/Niterói Caciques	80–63	93-54	173-117
Botafogo	88-76	98-100	186-176

==== Campeonato Carioca Final ====
Win Loss

1 October 2019 1	Flamengo	88–59	Botafogo	Rio de Janeiro, Brazil
20:00 UTC−03:00	Scoring by quarter: 27-22, 26-12, 19-14, 16-11
	Pts: Leron Black 21; Rebs: Leron Black 8 Asts: Balbi 7 Eff: Leron Black 28	Boxscore	Pts: Dú Sommer 15; Rebs: Cauê Borges, Diego Conceição, Dú Sommer, Mariano 5 Asts: Diego Conceição 3 Eff: Dú Sommer 16	Arena: Ginásio Álvaro Vieira Lima; Referees: Mauricio Serour, Wallace Pacífico, Gabriel Signorelli

3 October 2019 2	Botafogo	80–79	Flamengo	Rio de Janeiro, Brazil
20:00 UTC−03:00	Scoring by quarter: 22-19, 13-18, 24-27, 21-15
	Pts: Coelho 22; Rebs: Dú Sommer 12; Asts: Coelho 6 Eff: Coelho 29	Boxscore	Pts: Mineiro, Marquinhos 15; Rebs: Mineiro, Olivinha 8 Asts: Marquinhos, Olivinha 5 Eff: Mineiro 17	Arena: Ginásio Oscar Zelaya

4 October 2019 3	Flamengo	83–74	Botafogo	Rio de Janeiro, Brazil
20:00 UTC−03:00	Scoring by quarter: 19-26, 25-14, 23-20, 16-14
	Pts: Marquinhos 27; Rebs: Olivinha 7 Asts: Balbi 6 Eff: Mineiro 22	Boxscore	Pts: Cauê Borges 21; Rebs: Mariano 7 Asts: Cauê Borges 4 Eff: Cauê Borges 26	Arena: Ginásio Álvaro Vieira Lima; Referees: Mauricio Serour, Felipe Braga, Gabriel Signorelli

=== 2019–20 Basketball Champions League Americas ===
==== First Stage (Group C) ====
===== League table =====
Pos	Team	Pld	W	L	PF	PA	PD	Pts	Qualification	FLA	INS	VAL
1	(Brazil) Flamengo	4	4	0	338	301	+37	8	Advance to quarterfinals	—	81–76	82–71
2	(Argentina) Instituto	4	2	2	325	308	+17	6	Advance to quarterfinals	75–83	—	92–67
3	(Chile) Valdivia	4	0	4	294	348	−54	4		79–92	77–82	—

Source: BCL Americas

=== 2019-20 NBB ===
==== League table ====
Pos	Team	Pld	W	L	PF	PA	PD	Qualification or relegation
1	Flamengo	24	21	3	2040	1851	+189	Qualification to playoffs quarterfinals
2	SESI Franca	25	20	5	2186	1975	+211	Qualification to playoffs quarterfinals
3	São Paulo	26	20	6	2302	2122	+180	Qualification to playoffs quarterfinals
4	Minas	26	17	9	2252	2117	+135	Qualification to playoffs quarterfinals
5	Mogi das Cruzes/Helbor	26	16	10	2152	2117	+35	Qualification to playoffs first round

Updated to match(es) played on March 26, 2019. Source:

==== Matches ====
Win Loss Cancelled

12 October 2019 1	Minas	85–93	Flamengo	Belo Horizonte, Brazil
12:50 UTC−03:00	Scoring by quarter: 20-32, 18-20, 20-24, 27-17
Band	Pts: Alex, Leandrinho 22; Rebs: Scott 10; Asts: Leandrinho 6 Eff: Scott 21	Boxscore	Pts: Zach Graham 17; Rebs: Marquinhos, Olivinha 5 Asts: Balbi 9 Eff: Zach Graham 18	Arena: Juscelino Kubitschek Arena; Attendance: 2671; Referees: Cristiano Maranho, Fabiano Huber, Ramiro Inchauspe

18 October 2019 2	Universo/Brasília	81–86	Flamengo	Brasília, Brazil
21:10 UTC−03:00	Scoring by quarter: 25-19, 19-21, 20-22, 17-24
Fox Sports	Pts: Ronald 20; Rebs: Ronald 16; Asts: Nezinho 7 Eff: Ronald 30	Boxscore	Pts: Marquinhos 21; Rebs: Marquinhos 6 Asts: Balbi 8 Eff: Marquinhos 25	Arena: Ginásio da ASCEB; Attendance: 1281; Referees: Marcos Benito, Andreia Da Silva, Luiz Felipe Silva

22 October 2019 3	Flamengo	78–75	Paulistano/Corpore	Brasília, Brazil *
19:00 UTC−03:00	Scoring by quarter: 23-24, 14-14, 21-21, 20-16
ESPN	Pts: Marquinhos 17; Rebs: Olivinha, Léo Demétrio 6 Asts: Balbi 6 Eff: Olivinha 18	Boxscore	Pts: Coleman 24; Rebs: Solano 10; Asts: Solano 8 Eff: Solano 24	Arena: Ginásio da ASCEB; Attendance: 287; Referees: Jacob Barreto, Cauan Santos, Leandro Sehnem

4	vs.

5	vs.

6	vs.

7	vs.

8	vs.

9	vs.

10	vs.

11	vs.

12	vs.

13	vs.

14	vs.

15	vs.

16	vs.

17	vs.

18	vs.

19	vs.

20	vs.

21	vs.

22	vs.

23	vs.

24	vs.

25	Botafogo	vs.

26	vs.	Corinthians

27	vs.	São Paulo

28	Bauru	vs.

29	vs.	Franca

*Due to a deal with the team's main sponsor, BRB, some home games were played at the city of Brasília
