= 2016 Brazil men's Olympic basketball team =

The 2016 Brazil men's Olympic basketball team was the men's national basketball team of Brazil that competed at the 2016 Summer Olympics, in Rio de Janeiro, Brazil. They automatically qualified, after FIBA voted to allow them to qualify as hosts, in a meeting at Tokyo, in August 2015. The team's head coach since 2010 was Rubén Magnano, and had Gustavo de Conti (Paulistano Basketball), Demétrius Ferraciú (Bauru Basketball), and José Alves Neto (Flamengo Basketball) as assistant coaches.

== Timeline ==
- June 10, 2016: 14-man roster announced
- June 24: Start of training camp
- July 23 – August 2: Exhibition games
- August 6–21: 2016 Summer Olympics

== Roster ==
The following is the Brazil roster for the men's basketball tournament of the 2016 Summer Olympics.

Brazil men's national basketball team – 2016 Summer Olympics roster
Players
Coaches

Pos.	No.	Name	Age – Date of birth	Height	Club	Ctr.
PG	5	Raulzinho Neto	24 – 19 May 1992	1.92 m (6 ft 4 in)	Utah Jazz	(United States)
C	6	Cristiano Felício	24 – 7 July 1992	2.08 m (6 ft 10 in)	Chicago Bulls	(United States)
SG	8	Vítor Benite	26 – 20 February 1990	1.90 m (6 ft 3 in)	UCAM Murcia	(Spain)
PG	9	Marcelinho Huertas	33 – 25 May 1983	1.91 m (6 ft 3 in)	Los Angeles Lakers	(United States)
G/F	10	Alex Garcia	36 – 4 March 1980	1.92 m (6 ft 4 in)	Bauru	(Brazil)
F	12	Guilherme Giovannoni	36 – 2 June 1980	2.04 m (6 ft 8 in)	Brasília	(Brazil)
F/C	13	Nenê	33 – 13 September 1982	2.11 m (6 ft 11 in)	Houston Rockets	(United States)
SF	14	Marquinhos Vieira	32 – 31 May 1984	2.07 m (6 ft 9 in)	Flamengo	(Brazil)
SG	19	Leandro Barbosa	33 – 28 November 1982	1.94 m (6 ft 4 in)	Phoenix Suns	(United States)
F/C	23	Augusto Lima	24 – 17 September 1991	2.06 m (6 ft 9 in)	Real Madrid	(Spain)
F/C	30	Rafael Hettsheimeir	30 – 16 June 1986	2.08 m (6 ft 10 in)	Bauru	(Brazil)
PG	55	Rafael Luz	24 – 11 February 1992	1.88 m (6 ft 2 in)	Flamengo	(Brazil)

Head coach

- (Argentina) Rubén Magnano

Assistant coach(es)

- (Brazil) José Alves Neto
- (Brazil) Gustavo de Conti
- (Brazil) Demétrius Conrado Ferraciú

Legend

- Club – describes last
  club before the tournament
- Age – describes age
  on 6 August 2016

On 27 July, Anderson Varejão left the squad due to injury and was replaced by Cristiano Felício.

The following were also candidates to make the team:

Earlier candidates
Player	NBA Team (Note: Team at the time player was a candidate)	Added	Removed	Reason
Cristiano Felício	Chicago Bulls	-	June 10, 2016	Withdrew
Lucas Nogueira	Toronto Raptors	-	June 10, 2016	Withdrew
Deryk Ramos	Brasília Basketball	June 24, 2016	July 18, 2016	Players Invited
Humberto Silva	Flamengo Basketball	June 24, 2016	July 18, 2016	Players Invited
Pedro Henrique	Paulistano Basketball	June 24, 2016	July 18, 2016	Players Invited
Guilherme Hubner	Paulistano Basketball	June 24, 2016	July 18, 2016	Players Invited
Wesley Sena	Bauru Basketball	June 24, 2016	July 18, 2016	Players Invited
Vítor Faverani	UCAM Murcia	June 10, 2016	July 1, 2016	Injured
Larry Taylor	Mogi das Cruzes Helbor	June 10, 2016	July 20, 2016	12-man roster cut
Anderson Varejão	Golden State Warriors	June 10, 2016	July 27, 2016	Injured

== Exhibition games ==
July 22, 2016

Report

Romania	45–90	Brazil
Scoring by quarter: 6–32, 9–24, 16–24, 14–31
Pts: Ray 14; Rebs: Olah 6 Asts: Ray, Aktas 3		Pts: Barbosa 22; Rebs: Hettsheimeir 8 Asts: Neto 7

Arena Hebraica
São Paulo, São Paulo
Attendance: 1,861

July 25, 2016

Report

Romania	50–96	Brazil
Scoring by quarter: 11–24, 12–18, 15–33, 12–21
Pts: Olah 18; Rebs: Corpodean 5 Asts: Mihail 4		Pts: Nenê 22; Rebs: Hettsheimeir 8 Asts: Huertas 7

Arena Hebraica
São Paulo, São Paulo
Attendance: 1,960

July 28, 2016

Report

Australia	67–96	Brazil
Scoring by quarter: 19–21, 10–23, 23–20, 15–32
Pts: Mills 18; Rebs: Baynes 6 Asts: Mills, Dellavedova 5		Pts: Neto 17; Rebs: Lima 7 Asts: Huertas 7

Arena Hugo Ramos
Mogi das Cruzes, São Paulo
Attendance: 2,864

July 30, 2016

Report

China	52–91	Brazil
Scoring by quarter: 10–19, 12–28, 11–22, 19–22
Pts: Jiwei 13; Rebs: Yuchen 6 Asts: Ran 4		Pts: Lima 16; Rebs: Giovannoni, Huertas, Lima 5 Asts: Neto 6

Arena Hugo Ramos
Mogi das Cruzes, São Paulo
Attendance: 4,782

July 31, 2016

Report

Lithuania	62–64	Brazil
Scoring by quarter: 19–24, 19–12, 12–11, 12–17
Pts: Kalnietis 13; Rebs: Valančiūnas 9 Asts: Five Players 5		Pts: Marquinhos 14; Rebs: Lima, Nenê 7 Asts: Huertas 4

Arena Hugo Ramos
Mogi das Cruzes, São Paulo
Attendance: 5,024

August 2, 2016

Report

China	69–83	Brazil
Scoring by quarter: 25–15, 17–24, 10–21, 17–23
Pts: Jianlian 21; Rebs: Jianlian 6 Asts: Jiwei, Ran 3		Pts: Benite 13; Rebs: Barbosa, Lima, Nenê 6 Asts: Huertas 10

Arena Hugo Ramos
Mogi das Cruzes, São Paulo
Attendance: 3,096

== Olympic play ==
=== Preliminary round ===
Pos	Team	Pld	W	L	PF	PA	PD	Pts	Qualification
1	Croatia	5	3	2	400	407	−7	8 (Note: In games among the four teams at 3–2, Croatia and Spain were 2–1 while Argentina and Lithuania were 1–2. Croatia beat Spain 72–70, and Lithuania beat Argentina 81–73.)	Quarterfinals
2	Spain	5	3	2	432	357	+75	8	Quarterfinals
3	Lithuania	5	3	2	392	428	−36	8	Quarterfinals
4	Argentina	5	3	2	441	428	+13	8	Quarterfinals
5	Brazil (H)	5	2	3	411	407	+4	7	
6	Nigeria	5	1	4	392	441	−49	6	

Source: FIBA
Rules for classification: 1) points; 2) head-to-head points; 3) head-to-head points difference; 4) head-to-head number of points scored.
(H) Hosts

==== Lithuania ====
7 August 2016
14:15

Boxscore

Brazil	76–82	Lithuania
Scoring by quarter: 17–27, 12–31, 23–12, 24–12
Pts: Barbosa 21; Rebs: Nenê 8 Asts: Huertas 3		Pts: Kalnietis 16; Rebs: Jankūnas 7 Asts: Kalnietis 8

Carioca Arena 1, Rio de Janeiro
Attendance: 7,990
Referees: Eddie Viator (FRA), Steven Anderson (USA), José Reyes (MEX)

==== Spain ====
9 August 2016
14:15

Boxscore

Spain	65–66	Brazil
Scoring by quarter: 13–18, 18–16, 14–19, 20–13
Pts: Gasol 13; Rebs: Gasol 10; Asts: Rodríguez 5		Pts: Huertas 11; Rebs: Lima 10; Asts: Huertas 7

Carioca Arena 1, Rio de Janeiro
Attendance: 10,761
Referees: Ilija Belošević (SRB), Roberto Vázquez (PUR), Damir Javor (SLO)

==== Croatia ====
11 August 2016
14:15

Boxscore

Brazil	76–80	Croatia
Scoring by quarter: 17–19, 14–22, 19–18, 26–21
Pts: Barbosa 16; Rebs: Lima 6 Asts: Huertas 9		Pts: Bogdanović 33; Rebs: Šarić 7 Asts: Ukić 4

Carioca Arena 1, Rio de Janeiro
Attendance: 10,756
Referees: Borys Ryzhyk (UKR), Roberto Vázquez (PUR), Oļegs Latiševs (LAT)

==== Argentina ====
13 August 2016
14:15

Boxscore

Argentina	111–107 (2OT)	Brazil
Scoring by quarter: 28–19, 16–33, 23–20, 18–13, Overtime: 10–10, 16–12
Pts: Nocioni 37; Rebs: Nocioni 11; Asts: Campazzo 11		Pts: Nenê 24; Rebs: Nenê 10; Asts: Neto 4

Carioca Arena 1, Rio de Janeiro
Attendance: 11,701
Referees: Christos Christodoulou (GRE), Stephen Seibel (CAN), José Reyes (MEX)

==== Nigeria ====
15 August 2016
14:15

Boxscore

Nigeria	69–86	Brazil
Scoring by quarter: 16–15, 15–27, 21–17, 17–27
Pts: Akognon 16; Rebs: Aminu 7 Asts: four players 2		Pts: Nenê 19; Rebs: Nenê 7 Asts: Huertas 11

Carioca Arena 1, Rio de Janeiro
Attendance: 11,173
Referees: Ilija Belošević (SRB), Ferdinand Pascual (PHI), Robert Lottermoser (GER)
