= Felipe Silva =

Felipe Silva may refer to:

- Felipe França Silva (born 1987), Brazilian breaststroke swimmer
- Felipe Lourenço da Silva (born 1990), Brazilian volleyball player
- Felipe Silva (water polo) (born 1984), Brazilian water polo player
- Felipe da Silva (died 1644), Portuguese soldier in the service of Spain
- Felipe Silva (rugby union) (born 1986), Brazilian rugby sevens player
- Felipe Silva (footballer) (born 1990), Brazilian footballer
- Felipe Silva (footballer, born 1992) (born 1992), Brazilian footballer
- Felipe Machado Silva (born 1998), Brazilian basketball player
- Felipe Silva (fighter) (born 1984), Brazilian mixed martial arts fighter
