= 2021–22 Flamengo Basketball season =

Flamengo
2021–22 season
- Chairman: Rodolfo Landim
- Head coach: Gustavo de Conti
- Arena: Maracanãzinho (capacity: 11,800)
- Campeonato Carioca: Winners
- NBB: Runners-up
- Super 8: 3rd
- Champions League: Quarterfinals
- Intercontinental Cup: Winners
Home	Away

The 2021–22 season of Flamengo Basketball is the 102nd season of the club, and the club's 14th in the Novo Basquete Brasil (NBB).

The team finished the league season winning 26 games and losing 3 giving them an 81.3% victory percentage. These results were enough to bring them to second.
