= Leron Black =

American basketball player (born 1996)

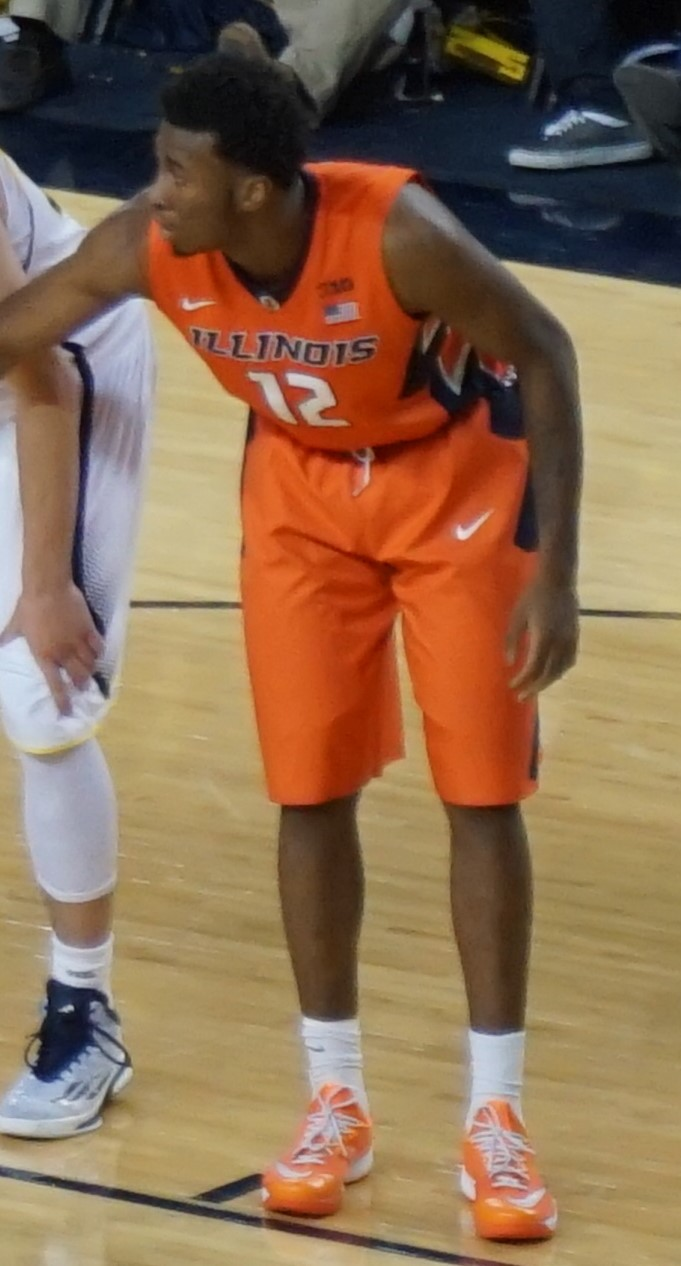
- Black with the Illinois Fighting Illini in 2014

Portland Trail Blazers
- Title: Player development coach
- League: NBA

Personal information
- Born: January 31, 1996 (age 30) Omaha, Nebraska, U.S.
- Listed height: 6 ft 7 in (2.01 m)
- Listed weight: 220 lb (100 kg)

Career information
- High school: White Station (Memphis, Tennessee)
- College: Illinois (2014–2018)
- NBA draft: 2018: undrafted
- Playing career: 2018–2021
- Position: Small forward
- Number: 12
- Coaching career: 2023–present

Career history

Playing
- 2018–2019: Argentino de Junín
- 2019–2020: Flamengo
- 2020: Minas
- 2020: Abejas de León
- 2020–2021: Team Cali

Coaching
- 2023–2025: Rip City Remix (assistant)
- 2025–present: Portland Trail Blazers (player development)

Career highlights
- Tennessee Mr. Basketball Class AAA (2014)

Leron "Boogie" Black (born January 31, 1996) is an American former professional basketball player who currently serves as a player development coach for the Portland Trail Blazers of the National Basketball Association (NBA). He played college basketball for the Illinois Fighting Illini.

== High school career ==
In September 2012, Black verbally committed to Baylor University to play basketball, only to de-commit in January 2013. At the time in 2012, Black was actually the first top 25 recruit to announce his verbal commitment. Black explained that he committed to Baylor too early before exploring all of his options available. In talking about schools he was considering, Black listed UConn, Florida, Illinois, Indiana, Louisville, Memphis, and Ohio State.

After his official visit to Illinois, Black verbally committed to the program and coach John Groce on September 1, 2013. On November 15, 2013, Black then signed his National Letter of Intent to play for Illinois starting in the 2014–15 season. During his senior season, Black averaged 20.2 points and 12.9 rebounds and lead White Station to a 30–3 record. Black was named Class AAA Tennessee Mr. Basketball for 2014, the Gatorade Tennessee Boys Basketball Player of the Year for 2014 and was named First team All-State by USA Today.

College recruiting
Name	Hometown	School	Height	Weight	Commit date
Leron Black; PF	Memphis, TN	White Station (Tennessee)	6 ft 7 in (2.01 m)	225 lb (102 kg)	Sep 1, 2013
Leron Black; PF	Recruit ratings: Scout: Rivals: 247Sports: (87)				
Overall recruit ranking: Scout: 50 Rivals: 38 ESPN: 44
Note: In many cases, Scout, Rivals, 247Sports, On3, and ESPN may conflict in their listings of height and weight.; In these cases, the average was taken. ESPN grades are on a 100-point scale.; Sources: "2014 Illinois Basketball Commitment List". Rivals.; "2014 Illinois Basketball Commitment List". Scout.; "2014 Illinois Basketball Commitment List". ESPN.; "Scout.com Team Recruiting Rankings". Scout.; "2014 Team Ranking". Rivals.

== College playing career ==
In his first career start on January 21, 2015, Black posted a double-double in a win against Purdue with 15 points and a career high 13 rebounds, becoming the first Illinois player since Lowell Hamilton to post a double-double in his first career start.

On October 8, 2015, it was announced that Black would miss 4–6 weeks after having surgery to repair a Meniscus tear in his knee. He returned to the lineup during the win against North Dakota State on November 15, 2015.

Following the 2017–18 season, Black was named to the honorable mention All Big-10 team by both the coaches and media.

=== College statistics ===
Year	Team	GP	GS	MPG	FG%	3P%	FT%	RPG	APG	SPG	BPG	PPG
2014–15	Illinois	33	10	14.8	.475	.000	.682	4.3	.1	.3	.2	5.0
2015–16	Illinois	7	3	14.3	.417	.000	.500	4.4	.6	.3	.3	4.4
2016–17	Illinois	31	27	20.2	.453	.297	.722	6.3	.4	.5	.1	8.1
2017–18	Illinois	31	30	25.5	.547	.512	.800	5.2	.8	.3	.3	15.3
Career		102	70	19.6	.499	.398	.749	5.2	.5	.4	.2	9.0

== Professional playing career ==
On March 15, 2018, Black announced he would forego his final season of eligibility at Illinois to pursue a professional basketball career. He was not selected in the 2018 NBA draft.

On August 5, 2018, Black signed a one-year deal with the Israeli team Elitzur Yavne of the Liga Leumit. However, on October 8, 2018, Black parted ways with Yavne before appearing in a game for them.

On October 20, 2018, Black was selected with the 25th pick in the first round of the 2018 NBA G League Draft by the Raptors 905. On November 1, 2018, the Raptors 905 announced that they had waived him from training camp.

On November 30, 2018, Black signed with Argentino de Junín of the Liga Nacional de Básquet in Argentina.

On July 3, 2019, Black signed with Flamengo to play the 2019–20 NBB season in Brazil. In 11 games he averaged 3.0 points and 1.7 rebounds per game. Black joined Minas for the remainder of the season and averaged 4.3 points and 1.7 rebounds per game. On August 8, 2020, Black signed with Abejas de León of the LNBP.

On April 28, 2021, Black re-signed with Team Cali of the Baloncesto Profesional Colombiano.

== The Basketball Tournament ==
Black joined House of 'Paign, a team composed primarily of Illinois alumni in The Basketball Tournament 2020. He scored two points in a 76–53 win over War Tampa in the first round.

== International play ==
In May 2014, Black was among the 24 players who earned an invitation to the training camp for USA Basketball FIBA Americas Under-18 Championship at the United States Olympic Training Center in Colorado Springs, Colorado.

== Coaching career ==
Black joined the Dayton Flyers as a graduate assistant in 2021. He was elevated to the position of video coordinator in 2023.

On October 30, 2023, Black was hired as an assistant coach and director of video by the Rip City Remix of the NBA G League. Black was promoted to an assistant coach the following season for the Rip City Remix.

On June 11, 2025, the Portland Trail Blazers hired Black to serve as a player development coach.
