= Léo Bispo =

Brazilian basketball player

No. 20 – Flamengo
- Position: Power forward/center
- League: NBB

Personal information
- Born: 5 October 1996 (age 30) São Paulo, Brazil
- Listed height: 6 ft 9 in (2.06 m)

Career information
- Playing career: 2015–present

Career history
- 2015–2016: Pinheiros
- 2016–present: Flamengo
Medals
Men's basketball
Representing Brazil
FIBA South America Under-15 Championship
Silver medal – second place	2011 Asunción	U15 National Team

Leonardo "Léo" Bispo de Souza (born 2 October 1996) is a Brazilian professional basketball player with Flamengo in the NBB.
