= Sui Ran =

Chinese basketball player

Personal information
- Born: June 25, 1992 (age 34) Taiyuan, Shanxi, China
- Listed height: 6 ft 4 in (1.93 m)

Career information
- NBA draft: 2012: undrafted
- Playing career: 2008–2018
- Position: Point guard / shooting guard
- Number: 5

Career history
- 2008–2018: Shandong Golden Stars

Sui Ran (Chinese: 睢冉), born June 25, 1992) is a Chinese former professional basketball player. He played for the Shandong Golden Stars of the Chinese Basketball Association.

He represented China's national basketball team at the 2016 Summer Olympics in Rio de Janeiro.

He announced his retirement December 31, 2018 due to illness.
