= M. J. Rhett =

American basketball player (born 1992)

Al-Kahrabaa
- Position: Center / power forward
- League: Iraqi Basketball Premier League

Personal information
- Born: November 15, 1992 (age 34) Hopkins, South Carolina, U.S.
- Listed height: 6 ft 9 in (2.06 m)
- Listed weight: 235 lb (107 kg)

Career information
- High school: Lower Richland (Columbia, South Carolina)
- College: Tennessee State (2011–2014); Ole Miss (2014–2015)
- NBA draft: 2015: undrafted
- Playing career: 2015–present

Career history
- 2015–2016: BK Barons
- 2016: Blackwater Elite
- 2016: Leones de Santo Domingo
- 2016–2017: Sigal Prishtina
- 2017: Tadamon Zouk
- 2017: Cholet Basket
- 2017: Leones de Santo Domingo
- 2017–2018: Flamengo
- 2018: Leones de Santo Domingo
- 2018: Pauian Archiland
- 2018: Las Fieras de La Villa
- 2019: Obras Sanitarias
- 2019: Indios de Mayagüez
- 2019: Capitanes de Arecibo
- 2019: Club Rafael Barias
- 2019: Cibona Zagreb
- 2020: PAOK
- 2020: GTK Gliwice
- 2020–2021: MKS Dąbrowa Górnicza
- 2021: Boulazac
- 2022: Marineros de Puerto Plata
- 2022–2023: Aldar Tanan Garid
- 2023: Al-Arabi SC
- 2023: Titanes del Distrito Nacional
- 2023: Panteras de Aguascalientes
- 2023: College Park Skyhawks
- 2024–present: Al-Kahrabaa

Career highlights
- Croatian League champion (2019); Rio de Janeiro Basketball Tournament champion (2018); Kosovo League champion (2017); Kosovo Cup champion (2017); Dominican Republic League champion (2016)

Malcolm Jaleel "M. J." Rhett (born November 15, 1992) is an American professional basketball player for Al-Kahrabaa of the Iraqi Basketball Premier League. He played college basketball for the Tennessee State Tigers and the Ole Miss Rebels.

== Professional career ==
Rhett has played, in the course of his professional career, in Latvia, the Philippines, the Dominican Republic, Lebanon, France, Brazil, Croatia, Mexico and Greece.

Rhett signed with GTK Gliwice of the PLK on July 17, 2020.

On December 2, 2020, Rhett signed with MKS Dąbrowa Górnicza of the Polish Basketball League (PLK).

On March 30, 2021, Rhett signed with Boulazac of the LNB Pro A.

On August 27, 2022, Rhett signed with Wilki Morskie Szczecin of the Polish Basketball League (PLK), but didn't play for them.

On November 16, 2023, Rhett signed with the College Park Skyhawks of the NBA G League, but was waived on December 26.

On April 4, 2024, Rhett was announced as import signing for Central African club Bangui Sporting Club, for their debut season in the Basketball Africa League (BAL).
