= Felipe Machado Silva =

Brazilian basketball player

Felipin
No. 6 – Flamengo
- Position: Small forward
- League: NBB

Personal information
- Born: 30 October 1998 (age 27) Rio de Janeiro, Brazil
- Listed height: 6 ft 6 in (1.98 m)

Career information
- Playing career: 2016–present

Career history
- 2016–present: Flamengo

Felipe "Felipin" Machado Silva (born 30 October 1998) is a Brazilian professional basketball player with Flamengo in the NBB.
