= Danilo Monteiro Martins =

Brazilian basketball player

Danilo
No. 17 – Flamengo
- Position: Power forward
- League: NBB

Personal information
- Born: 16 May 1998 (age 28) Brazil
- Listed height: 6 ft 4 in (1.93 m)

Career information
- Playing career: 2016–present

Career history
- 2016–present: Flamengo

Danilo Monteiro Martins (born 16 May 1998) is a Brazilian professional basketball player with Flamengo in the NBB.
