= Ronald Ramón =

Dominican basketball player

Personal information
- Born: January 14, 1986 (age 40) Bronx, New York
- Listed height: 6 ft 0 in (1.83 m)
- Listed weight: 185 lb (84 kg)

Career information
- College: Pittsburgh (2004–2008)
- Playing career: 2004–2018
- Position: Guard

Career history
- 2008–2009: Lanús
- 2009: Club Atlético Tabaré
- 2010: Toros de Aragua
- 2010–2016: Limeira
- 2016–2018: Flamengo

Career highlights
- NBB champion (2016); NBB All-Star

Ronald Ramón (born January 14, 1986) is a Dominican basketball coach and former professional player who currently serves an assistant coach for the Fordham Rams. He last played for Flamengo of the Novo Basquete Brasil (NBB) and the Dominican national team, where he participated at the 2014 FIBA Basketball World Cup.

== The Basketball Tournament (TBT) ==
In the summer of 2017, Ramón competed in The Basketball Tournament on ESPN for Zoo Crew which was a team composed of University of Pittsburgh basketball alum. Competing for the $2 million grand prize, Ramón scored seven points and dished out two assists in 30 minutes as Zoo Crew fell in the first-round 100–87 to the Sideline Cancer.

== Coaching career ==
In 2019, Pitt head coach Jeff Capel hired Ramón as an assistant for basketball operations. He served in that role until spring of 2021, when he was hired as an assistant coach at Fordham under new head coach Kyle Neptune.

== College career ==
=== College statistics ===
Year	Team	GP	GS	MPG	FG%	3P%	FT%	RPG	APG	SPG	BPG	PPG
2004–05	Pittsburgh	28	9	26.1	.363	.336	.774	1.7	1.9	.9	.0	6.8
2005–06	Pittsburgh	33	27	24.9	.463	.415	.831	1.4	2.2	.7	.0	8.0
2006–07	Pittsburgh	37	0	23.9	.464	.451	.868	1.8	2.2	.5	.1	8.8
2007–08	Pittsburgh	37	37	31.8	.388	.372	.710	2.6	3.6	1.0	.1	8.5
Career		135	73	26.8	.418	.395	.801	1.9	2.5	.8	.0	8.1

== Career statistics ==
=== NBB regular season ===
Season	Team	GP	MPG	2PT FG%	3PT FG%	FT%	RPG	APG	SPG	BPG	PPG
2010–11	Limeira	27	31.9	.431	.367	.871	3.0	3.0	1.0	.0	12.9
2011–12	Limeira	25	28.6	.470	.438	.878	1.7	2.2	0.6	.0	13.7
2012–13	Limeira	34	30.7	.516	.485	.819	2.3	3.5	0.6	.0	14.2
2013–14	Limeira	28	31.2	.500	.379	.833	3.1	2.8	1.3	.0	12.7
2015–16	Flamengo	13	19.0	.355	.400	.846	1.8	1.9	1.2	.0	4.8
Career		157	29.6	.482	.427	.857	3.0	3.22	.96	.03	12.6
All-Star		1									

=== NBB playoffs ===
Season	Team	GP	MPG	2PT FG%	3PT FG%	FT%	RPG	APG	SPG	BPG	PPG
2012	Limeira	5	38.3	.476	.441	.875	1.8	1.6	.6	.0	17.2
2013	Limeira	5	28.2	.435	.560	.833	1.4	1.6	.8	.2	15.4
2013	Limeira	5	36.8	.556	.429	.813	3.2	3.0	1.2	.0	15.6
2014	Limeira	5	35.8	.519	.269	.880	3.6	3.0	1.0	.2	14.2
Career		20	34.8	.494	.425	.855	2.5	2.3	.9	.1	15.6
