= Humberto Silva =

Brazilian professional basketball player

No. 19 – Corinthians
- Position: Point guard / shooting guard
- League: NBB

Personal information
- Born: February 7, 1995 (age 31) São Paulo, Brazil
- Listed height: 6 ft 4.75 in (1.95 m)
- Listed weight: 220 lb (100 kg)

Career information
- NBA draft: 2017: undrafted
- Playing career: 2013–present

Career history
- 2013–2016: Pinheiros
- 2016–2018: Flamengo
- 2018–2020: Corinthians
- 2023-present: R10 Score Vasco da Gama

Career highlights
- Rio de Janeiro State champion (2016)

Humberto Luiz Gomes da Silva, also known simply as Humberto (born February 7, 1995), is a Brazilian professional basketball player for Vasco da Gama of the Novo Basquete Brasil (NBB) from Brazil.

== Professional career ==
=== Flamengo ===
On 7 July 2016, Flamengo announced the signings of Humberto and Ricardo Fischer, as part of the club's new signings for the NBB's 2016–17 NBB.

=== Vasco da Gama ===
On 12 July 2023, Vasco announced the signing of Humberto for the Novo Basquete Brasil 2023-24 season. He was one of the many signings of the 2x National champion and 2x South-American champion team, who was returning to the major competition of Brazilian basketball after 4 years.

== NBB career statistics ==
=== Regular season ===
Season	Team	GP	MPG	2PT FG%	3PT FG%	FT%	RPG	APG	SPG	BPG	PPG
2013–14	Pinheiros	26	10.0	.452	.179	.722	1.7	.6	.3	.0	2.2
2014–15	Pinheiros	19	5.7	.385	.176	.500	.8	.3	.1	.1	1.1
2015–16	Pinheiros	28	18.3	.448	.293	.763	2.5	1.7	1.0	.2	7.0
2016–17	Flamengo	3	13.9	.200	.500	.750	1.7	.7	.7	.0	5.7
2017–18	Flamengo	10	8.5	.364	.333	1.000	.8	.6	.6	.1	1.9
Career		86	11.8	.429	.267	.747	1.7	.9	.5	.1	3.6

=== Playoffs ===
Season	Team	GP	MPG	2PT FG%	3PT FG%	FT%	RPG	APG	SPG	BPG	PPG
2014	Pinheiros	1	5.0	.000	.000	.000	.000	000	.0	.0	0.0
2015	Pinheiros	4	10.0	.000	.500	.750	1.3	1.0	.0	.3	1.5
2016	Pinheiros	9	29.3	.432	.396	.680	4.9	2.8	.9	.3	12.4
2017	Flamengo	5	7.8	.000	.000	.000	1.8	.6	.4	.0	.0
Career		19	18.3	.396	.357	.645	2.7	1.7	.5	.2	6.2
