= J. P. Batista =

Brazilian basketball player

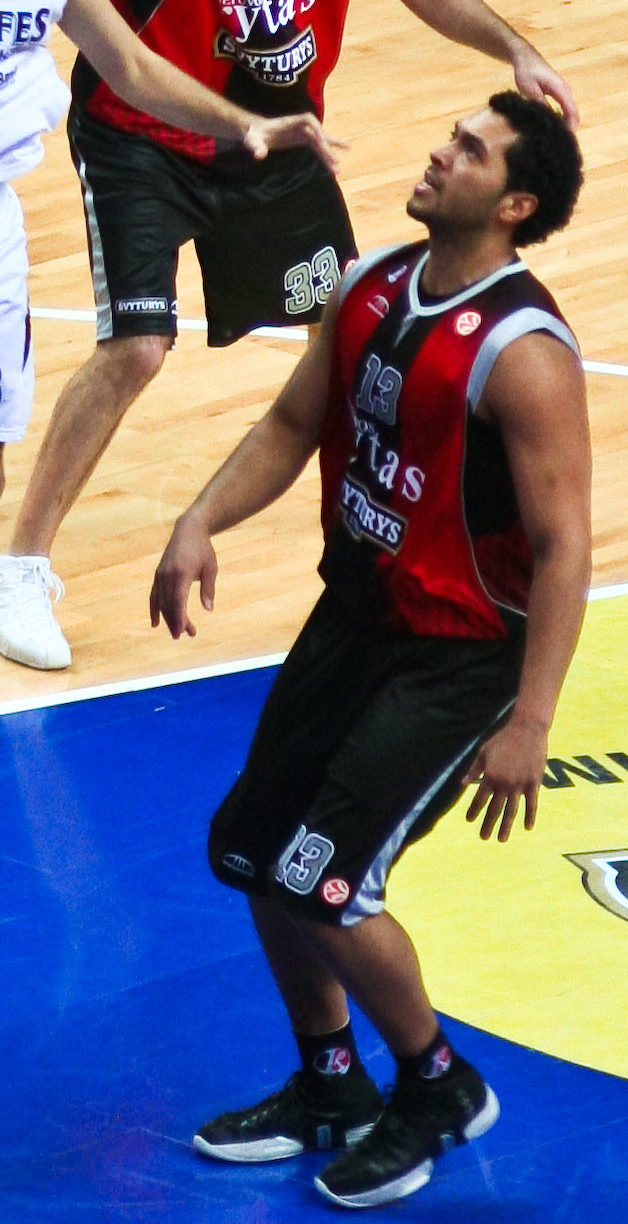

Gonzaga Bulldogs
- Title: Assistant coach
- League: NBB

Personal information
- Born: October 29, 1981 (age 45) Olinda, Pernambuco
- Listed height: 6 ft 9 in (2.06 m)
- Listed weight: 270 lb (122 kg)

Career information
- College: Western Nebraska CC (2002–2003); Barton County CC (2003–2004); Gonzaga (2004–2006)
- NBA draft: 2006: undrafted
- Playing career: 2006–2022
- Position: Power forward
- Number: 13
- Coaching career: 2022–present

Career history

Playing
- 2006–2008: Lietuvos rytas
- 2008: Barons Rīga
- 2008–2014: Le Mans Sarthe
- 2014–2015: Limoges CSP
- 2015–2018: Flamengo
- 2018–2019: Mogi das Cruzes
- 2019–2020: Le Mans Sarthe
- 2020–2021: Minas
- 2021–2022: Flamengo

Coaching
- 2022–present: Gonzaga (assistant)

Career highlights
- As player: FIBA Intercontinental Cup champion (2022); FIBA EuroChallenge champion (2008); French League champion (2015); French Leaders A Cup winner (2014); French Leaders A Cup MVP (2014); Latvian League champion (2008); Baltic League champion (2007); NBB champion (2016); NBB MVP (2019); First-team All-WCC (2006); WCC Newcomer of the Year (2005)
Medals
Men's basketball
Representing Brazil
FIBA AmeriCup
Gold medal – first place	2009 San Juan
Pan American Games
Gold medal – first place	2007 Rio de Janeiro
Gold medal – first place	2015 Toronto
FIBA South American Championship
Gold medal – first place	2010 Neiva
Silver medal – second place	2016 Caracas

João Paulo Lopes "J. P." Batista (born October 29, 1981) is a Brazilian former professional basketball player and current coach. Standing at 6 ft 9 in (2.06 m), he played the power forward position. He played college basketball at Gonzaga University and also started his coaching career with the Bulldogs as an assistant coach.

== Early life ==
Batista was born and raised in Olinda, Pernambuco, attended Colegio Atual school in Olinda and was named State Player of the Year as a senior in 2001.

== College career ==
Batista arrived at Gonzaga in 2004, after spending the first year of his college career at Western Nebraska Community College and the second at Barton County Community College in Kansas, where he mentored teammate and fellow international student Antanas Kavaliauskas. He finished his first season with Gonzaga averaging 12 points and 6 rebounds per game, and was named the top newcomer in the West Coast Conference.

Playing alongside the All-American Adam Morrison, Batista finished the 2005-06 NCAA basketball season averaging over 19 points and 9 rebounds per game, while shooting a remarkable 59 percent from the field and 83 percent from the free-throw line.

== Professional career ==
Despite his impressive collegiate statistics, Batista was generally ignored by the scouts leading up to the 2006 NBA draft, with his lack of athleticism and his age (he was nearly 25 at the time of the draft, unusually old for a college prospect) hindering his chances of being drafted. Batista played for the NBA's Minnesota Timberwolves entry in the Las Vegas Summer League, but he was not signed by the team.

He accepted an offer to play for Lietuvos rytas in Vilnius, Lithuania in the LKL and ULEB Cup. With Lietuvos rytas he played in the ULEB Cup and Lithuanian basketball Cup finals, and won the BBL championship. Their 2006-07 ULEB Cup run ended in a loss in the final to Real Madrid, but since Real had already qualified for the 2007-08 Euroleague through their league position, Lietuvos rytas received the Euroleague berth that normally goes to the ULEB Cup winners.

On June 16, 2014, he signed a two-year deal with French club Limoges CSP. With them he won the 2014–15 LNB Pro A championship. On June 25, 2015, he parted ways with Limoges.

On July 16, 2015, he returned to Brazil and signed with Flamengo.

On June 25, 2019, he has signed a contract with Le Mans Sarthe of the LNB Pro A.

== Coaching career ==
On August 14, 2022, Batista joined the Gonzaga Bulldogs as an assistant coach, thus returning to his alma mater after 16 years.

== EuroLeague career statistics ==
Legend
GP	Games played	GS	Games started	MPG	Minutes per game
FG%	Field-goal percentage	3P%	3-point field-goal percentage	FT%	Free-throw percentage
RPG	Rebounds per game	APG	Assists per game	SPG	Steals per game
BPG	Blocks per game	PPG	Points per game	PIR	Performance index rating
**Bold**	Career high

Year	Team	GP	GS	MPG	FG%	3P%	FT%	RPG	APG	SPG	BPG	PPG	PIR
2007–08	Lietuvos Rytas	**11**	0	8.0	.516	.000	.556	1.5	.2	.1	.0	3.4	2.0
2008–09	Le Mans	10	**7**	**23.5**	**.570**	.000	.667	**3.8**	**1.5**	**.7**	**.4**	**11.4**	**9.9**
2014–15	Limoges CSP	10	1	17.1	.455	.000	**.818**	2.1	1.0	.2	.2	7.8	6.0

== National team career ==
Batista represents the senior men's Brazilian national basketball team and he was a part of the 2010 FIBA World Championship squad.
