= João Vitor (basketball) =

Brazilian basketball player

No. 34 – Tangerang Hawks
- Position: Center
- League: IBL

Personal information
- Born: 15 December 1998 (age 27) Rio de Janeiro, Brazil
- Listed height: 7 ft 0 in (2.13 m)
- Listed weight: 264 lb (120 kg)

Career information
- Playing career: 2016–present

Career history
- 2016–2018: Flamengo
- 2019–2021: Unifacisa Basquete
- 2021: Club Biguá de Villa Biarritz
- 2023: Correbasket UAT
- 2023: Botafogo
- 2024–2025: Tijuana Zonkeys
- 2025–present: Tangerang Hawks
- 2026–present: KL Titans
Medals
Men's basketball
Representing Brazil
FIBA South America Under-17 Championship
| Silver medal – second place | 2015 Resistencia | U17 National Team |
FIBA Americas Under-18 Championship
| Bronze medal – third place | 2016 Valdivia | U18 National Team |

João Vitor França dos Santos (born 15 December 1998) is a Brazilian professional basketball player for the Tangerang Hawks of the Indonesian Basketball League. (IBL)

He joined the Tijuana Zonkeys of the Circuito de Baloncesto de la Costa del Pacífico (CIBACOPA) in Mexico for the 2024 CIBACOPA season.
