= Ginásio Álvaro Vieira Lima =

Indoor arena in Rio de Janeiro, Brazil

- Ginásio do Tijuca; Ginásio do Tênis Clube
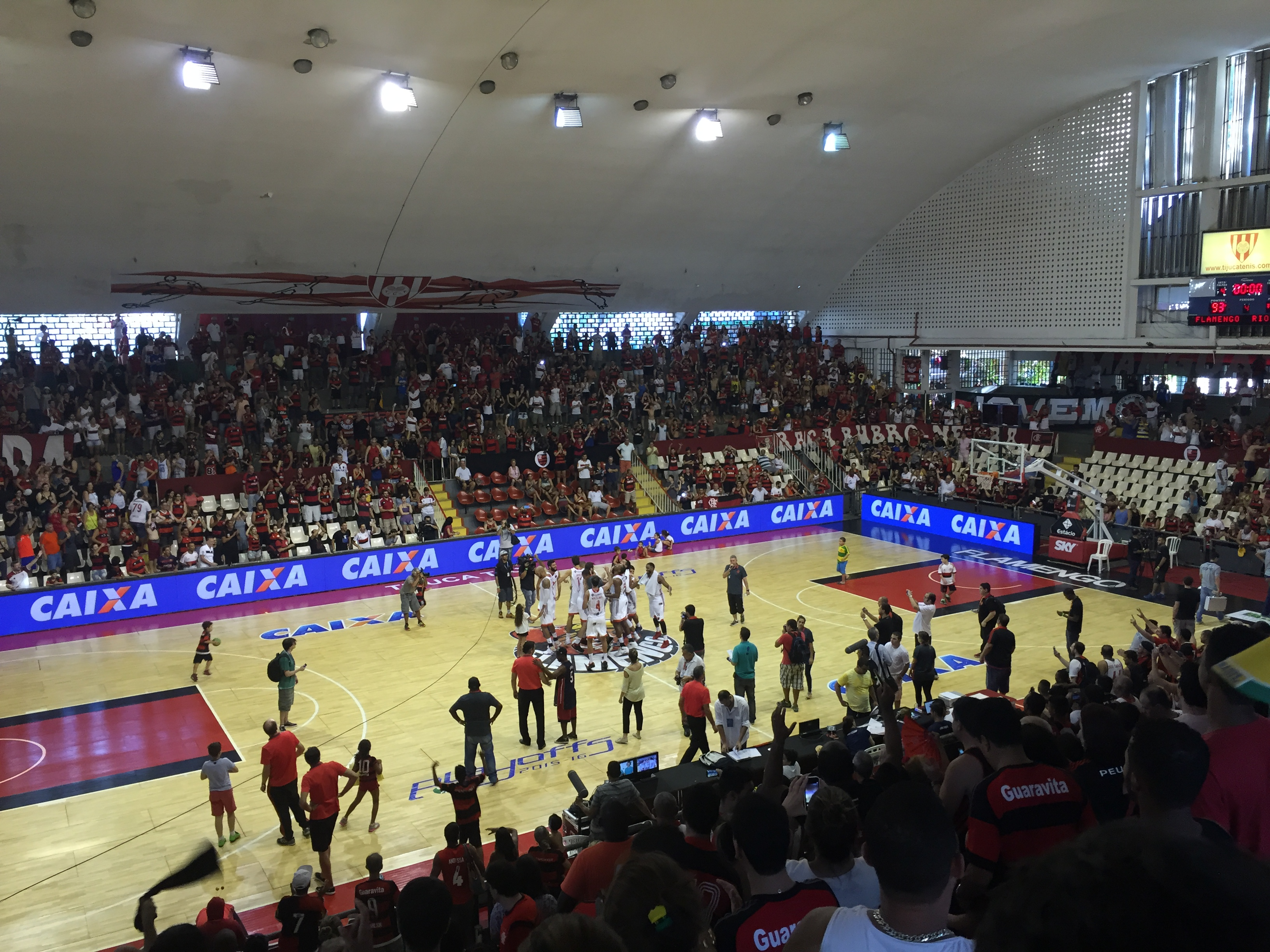
- Flamengo players celebrating advancing to the NBB semifinals
- Interactive map of Ginásio Álvaro Vieira Lima
- Address: Rua Desembargador Izidro, 83
- Location: Rio de Janeiro
- Coordinates: 22°55′40″S 43°14′1″W
- Owner: Tijuca Tênis Clube
- Operator: Tijuca Tênis Clube, Flamengo
- Capacity: Basketball: 3,000; Volleyball: 2,000
- Public transit: Saens Peña Station; Uruguai Station

Tenants
- Flamengo (NBB) (2009–present); Tijuca (NBB) (2009–2014); Rexona SESC-RJ (Women's Superliga) (2009–present); RJX (Men's Superliga) (2011–2014); Vasco da Gama (NBB) (2016–present)

Ginásio Álvaro Vieira Lima is an indoor arena that is located in Rio de Janeiro, Brazil. The arena has a seating capacity of 2,000 people for volleyball matches, and 3,000 people basketball games. The arena is often referred to as either Ginásio do Tijuca, or Ginásio do Tênis Clube, in reference to the neighborhood that it's located in, and to its owner.

== History ==
The arena has been often used as the home arena of Flamengo, of the Novo Basquete Brasil (NBB), during the regular season and early playoff rounds. It has been used by the club since 2009, and is one of the few arenas used in every season of the NBB.
