= Marcelo Vido =

Brazilian basketball player

Personal information
- Born: 15 January 1959 (age 67) São Paulo, Brazil
- Listed height: 6 ft 6 in (1.98 m)
- Listed weight: 200 lb (91 kg)
- Position: Small forward

Career highlights
- As a player: FIBA Intercontinental Cup champion (1979)

Marcelo Vido (born 15 January 1959) is a Brazilian former professional basketball player and coach.

== Playing career ==
During his pro club playing career, Vido won the 1979 edition of the FIBA Intercontinental Cup, while a member of EC Sírio. As a member of the senior Brazilian national basketball team, Vido played at the following major world tournaments: the 1978 FIBA World Cup, the 1980 Summer Olympics, the 1982 FIBA World Cup, the 1984 Summer Olympics, and the 1986 FIBA World Cup.

== Coaching career ==
After he ended his basketball playing career, Vido began a new career, working as a professional basketball coach.
