= Flamengo Basketball =

Flamengo
- Nickname: Fla; Big 'Mengo; Scarlet-Black; Vulture; The Evil One
- Leagues: NBB; BCLA
- Founded: 15 November 1895; 130 years ago (parent athletic club); 1919; 107 years ago (basketball club)
- History: C.R. Flamengo Basquete (1919–present)
- Arena: Maracanãzinho
- Capacity: 15,000
- Location: Rio de Janeiro, RJ, Brazil
- Team colors: Red, black, white
- Main sponsor: Banco BRB
- President: Luiz Eduardo Baptista
- Team manager: Diego Jeleilate
- Head coach: Sergio "Oveja" Hernández
- Championships: 2 FIBA Intercontinental Cup; 3 Champions League Americas/Americas League; 1 FIBA South American League (LSB); 1 South American Club Championship; 7 NBB Championships; 1 CBB Championship; See Honors
- Retired numbers: 1 (14)
- Website: flamengo.com.br
Home	Away

The Flamengo Basketball team is a professional Brazilian basketball team based in Rio de Janeiro. It is a part of the Clube de Regatas do Flamengo multi-sports club family. The club's full name is Basquetebol do Clube de Regatas do Flamengo. The club's commonly used short names are C.R.F. Basquete, C.R. Flamengo Basquete, Flamengo Basquete, and FlaBasquete.

Flamengo is one of the most traditional and successful basketball teams in Brazil, having won the top-tier level Brazilian National League title eight times, once during the Brazilian Basketball Championship era, and seven times during the NBB era (the current Brazilian League format). The team also won the South American second-tier level FIBA South American League (LSB) in 2009 (I), the Americas top-tier level FIBA Americas League in 2014 and Basketball Champions League Americas in 2021 and 2025, and the FIBA Intercontinental Cup twice in 2014 and 2022.

Brazil's senior national team's all time legend, Oscar Schmidt, played with Flamengo between 1999 and 2003, and is one of the most important players in the club's history.

== History ==
The red and black basketball team won its first championship in club history in 1919, while playing in the championship of the city of Rio de Janeiro. The club also won the Rio de Janeiro State Championship in 1932. When the Rio de Janeiro State Championship was again won in 1933, the team was still undefeated. In 1934 and 1935 they won the Rio de Janeiro State Championship title again.

== Arenas ==
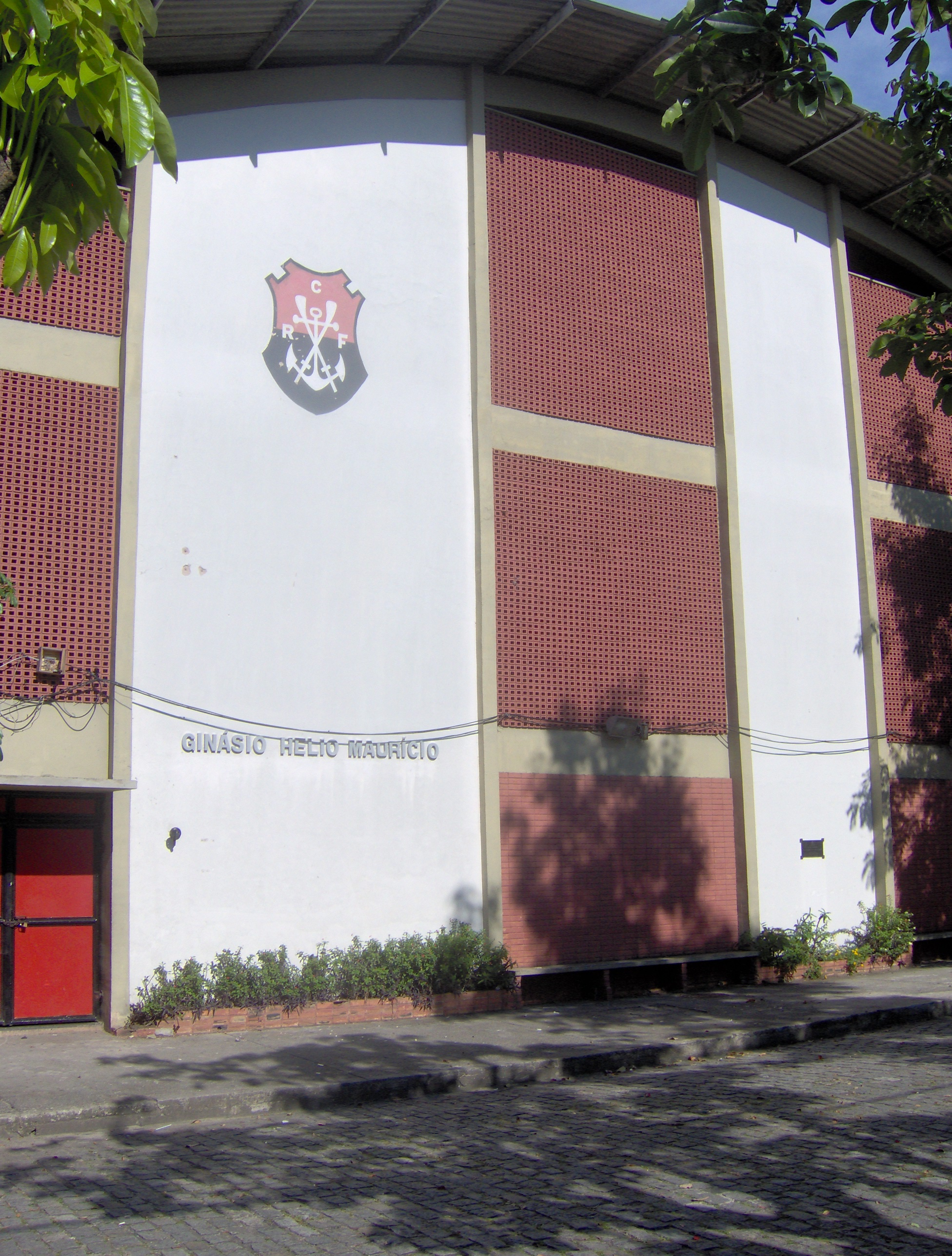
Hélio Maurício Gym.

=== Hélio Maurício Gym (Gavea) ===
Hélio Maurício Gym nowadays is used only by the Flamengo Youth Basketball Team, but for a long time the gym received also the professional team matches, including matches of the National League

The gym is quite small, with a seating capacity of 800 people for basketball games. Due to the small capacity, traditionally the professional team used the Maracanãzinho, HSBC Arena, and Carioca Arena 1 when a bigger attendance is expected. The gym is part of the Gávea complex, that includes other two gyms, several tennis court, swimming pools, restaurants, bars, and the Gavea Stadium. Flamengo Basketball professional team later played their home matches at HSBC Arena.

=== Maracanãzinho ===
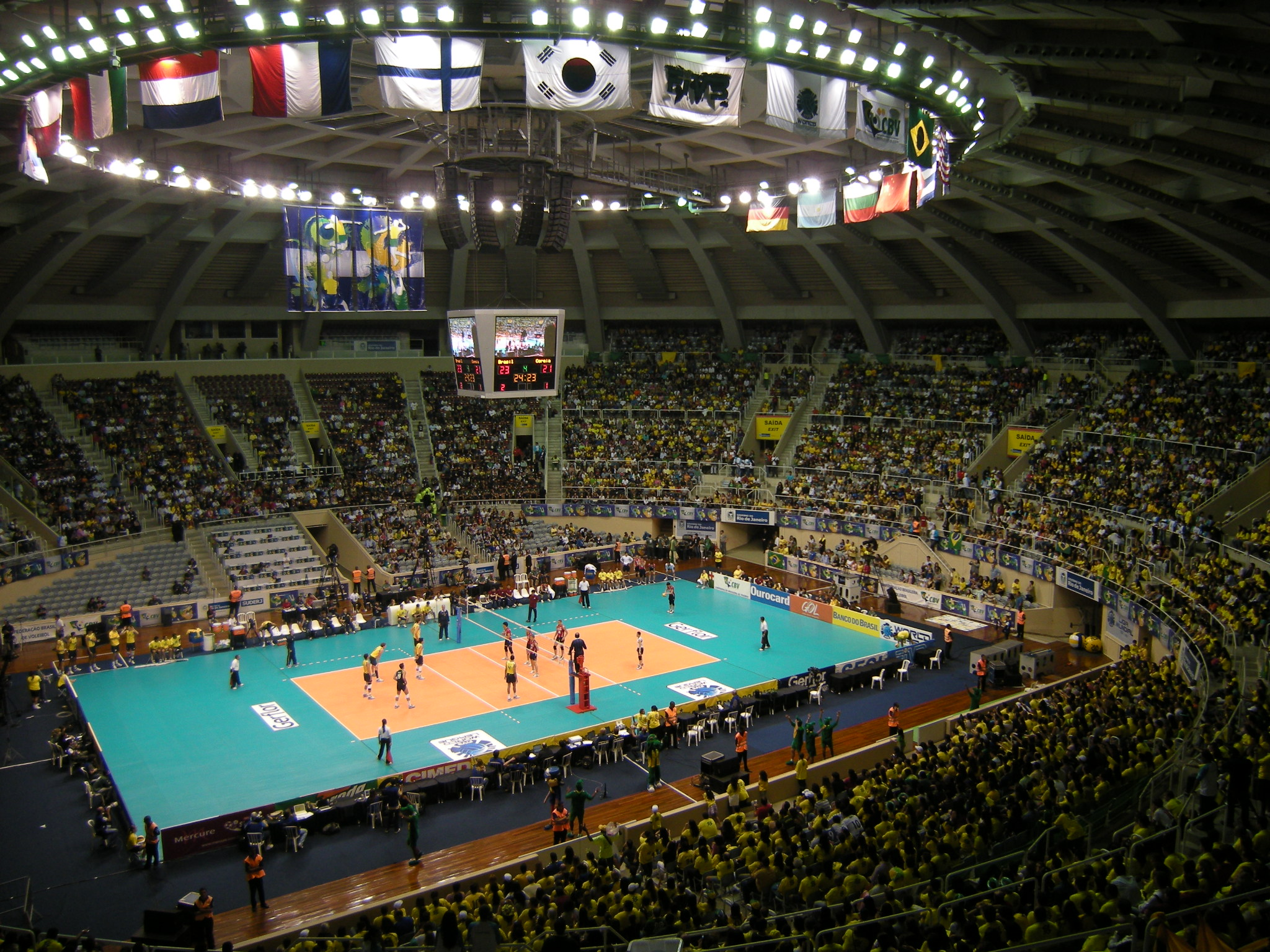
Ginásio do Maracanãzinho

Ginásio do Maracanãzinho, sometimes called just Maracanãzinho, is a modern indoor arena that is located in Maracanã neighborhood, Rio de Janeiro, Brazil. Its formal name, Ginásio Gilberto Cardoso, honors a former Clube de Regatas do Flamengo president. The capacity of the arena is 11,800 for basketball games. It was opened in 1954. Located near the Maracanã Stadium, Maracanãzinho means Little Maracanã.

For the 2007 Pan American Games, the gym was remodeled, with new central air conditioning, an added four-sided scoreboard, a new sound system, a dome which allows natural lighting during the day, new comfortable seating, and adaptions to all international requirements. As a result, the Maracanãzinho became a venue for the volleyball competitions of the 2007 Pan American Games, and many other international competitions. After the renovations, the capacity of the arena was reduced from approximately 13,000 to 11,800 spectators for futsal. The arena became more comfortable for spectators, as the field of vision was increased for better viewing of the arena floor.

=== HSBC Arena ===
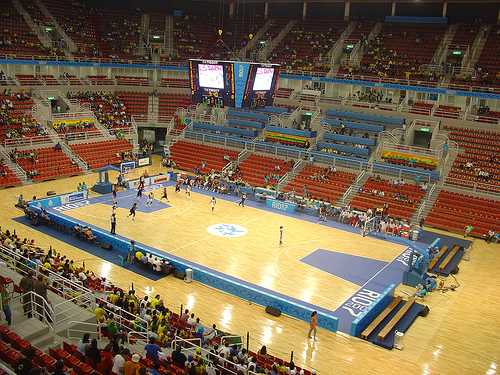
HSBC Arena

HSBC Arena indoor multi-purpose arena located in the neighborhood of Barra da Tijuca in Rio de Janeiro, Brazil. The arena was completed in 2007, and has a seating capacity of 15,430 people for basketball games. It hosted the basketball and gymnastics events at the 2007 Pan American Games. In December 2007, the arena started being operated by GL Events, who also operates the nearby Riocentro Convention Center and the Riocentro Sports Complex, and started hosting music concerts from a various hand of artists.

Starting 29 March 2008, the arena started to be called HSBC Arena, as part of a naming rights agreement with the bank.

The arena also started to receive Flamengo Basketball team in 2009, for the playoff's games of NBB League, and is the home of the team to the 09–10 season

=== Ginásio Álvaro Vieira Lima ===
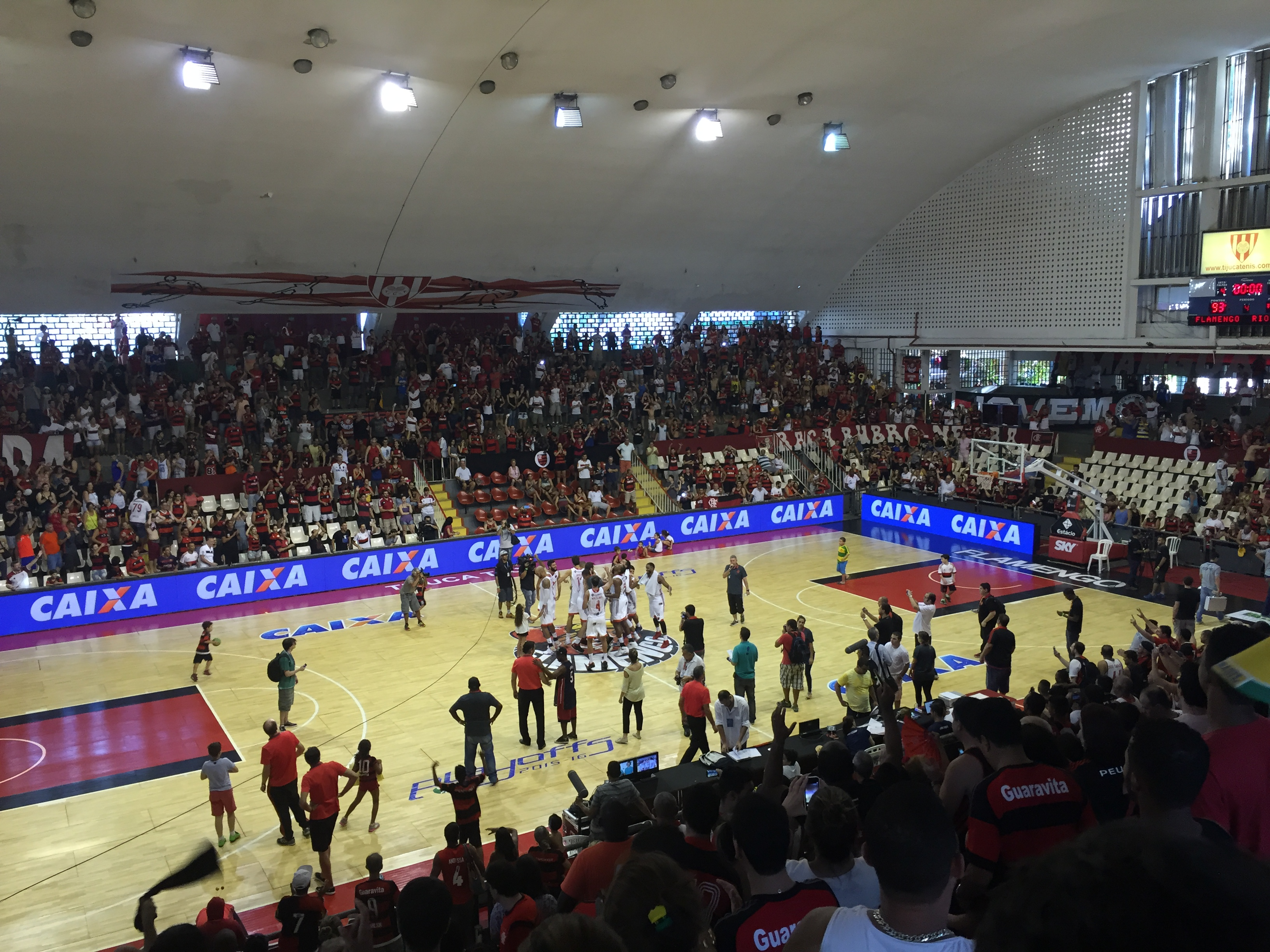
Ginásio Álvaro Vieira Lima

Flamengo has also used the Ginásio Álvaro Vieira Lima as a home arena. It has a seating capacity of 3,000 people for basketball games. The arena has been often used as the home arena of Flamengo, of the Novo Basquete Brasil (NBB), during the regular season and early playoff rounds.

The arena is often referred to as the Ginásio do Tijuca Tênis Clube, in reference to the neighborhood that it's located in, and to its owner, Tijuca Tênis Clube of the top-tier level Brazilian NBB league.

=== Carioca Arena 1 ===
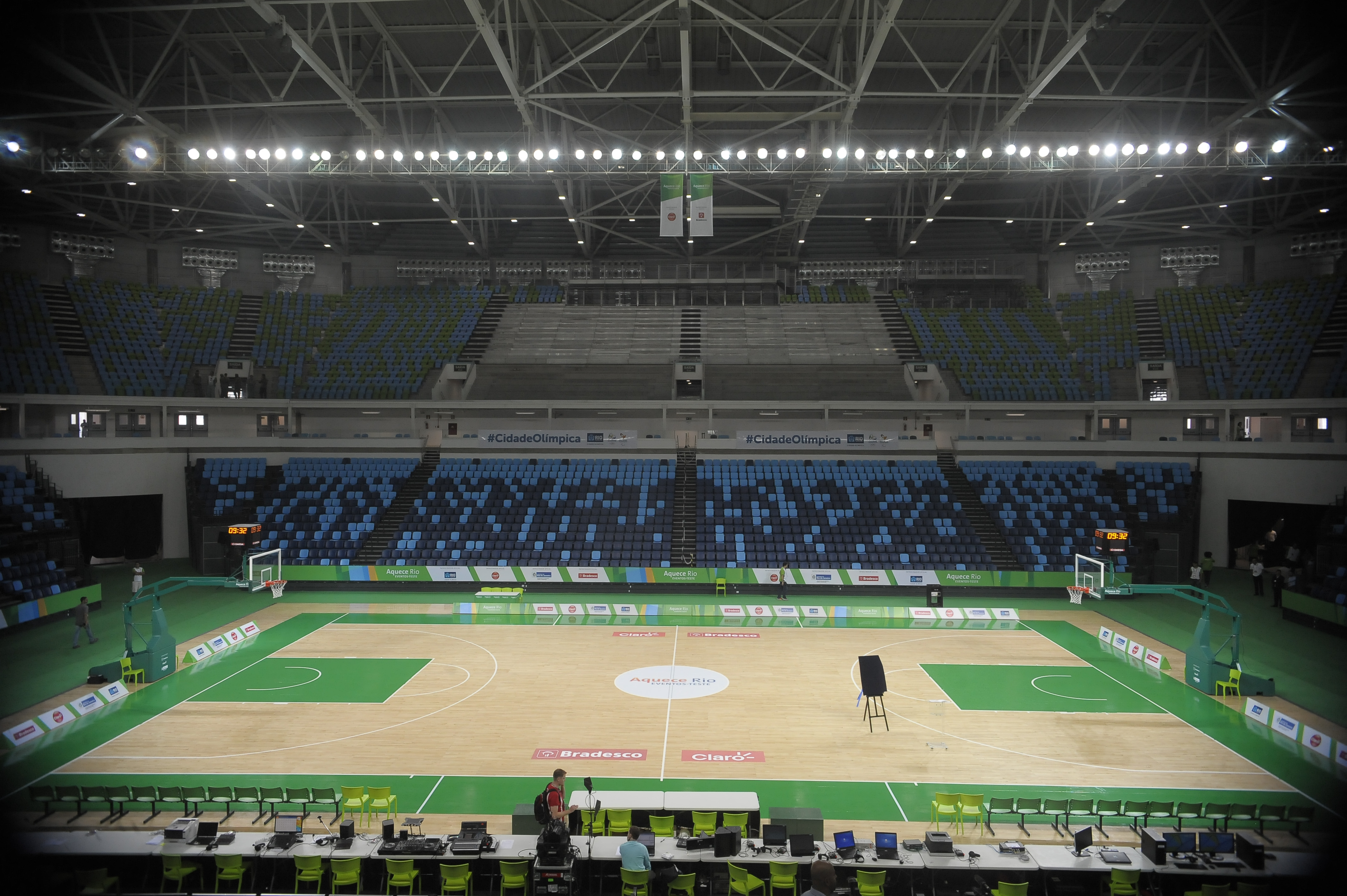
Carioca Arena 1

Flamengo has also used the Carioca Arena 1 as its home venue. It was constructed for the 2016 Summer Olympics. The arena originally had a seating capacity of 16,000 for the 2016 Olympics, but it was reduced to 6,000 after the Olympics.

Construction on the arena began in July 2013. The arena covers 38 thousand square meters. The arena's capacity for the 2016 Summer Olympics was 16,000 spectators. However, it was lowered to 6,000 after the Olympics. The facade has a height of 33 meters, and its shape is inspired by the mountainous landscape of the city. The track was built with two types of wood, one for a different track and to the surrounding area, as well as a system for absorbing blows of the sport. The arena has 282 rooms, 49 bathrooms, eight dressing rooms and six lifts.

The estimated cost for the planned complex of three arenas (Carioca 1, Carioca 2 and Carioca 3), the IBC, MPC, a hotel, and the structure of the Olympic Park was 1.678 billion Brazilian reais, including part of the public initiative and private money. This was handled between the Prefecture of Rio de Janeiro and the private sector.

The work was completed in January 2016. As a part of the arena's opening events, there was the Basketball Tournament International Women Aquece River, held from 15 to 17, January 2016, and the International Championship of Wheelchair Rugby Rio Aquece, held from 29 to 31 January 2016.

== Players ==
=== Current roster ===
Note: Flags indicate national team eligibility at FIBA-sanctioned events. Players may hold other non-FIBA nationalities not displayed.

Flamengo Basketball roster
Players
Coaches

Pos.	No.	Nat.	Name	Ht.	Wt.	Age
F	1	(Brazil)	Deodato, Guillerme	1.92 m (6 ft 4 in)	91 kg (201 lb)	35 – 2 June 1991
SF	2	(United States)	Cummings, Markeith	1.98 m (6 ft 6 in)	109 kg (240 lb)	37 – 21 December 1988
PF	6	(Brazil)	Cauã, Vitor	2.03 m (6 ft 8 in)	103 kg (227 lb)	22 – 30 August 2004
F	7	(Brazil)	Luz, Jhonatan	1.96 m (6 ft 5 in)	87 kg (192 lb)	23 – 7 November 2002
PG	9	(Argentina)	Baralle, Franco Andrés	1.77 m (5 ft 10 in)	82 kg (181 lb)	27 – 25 March 1999
G	10	(Brazil)	Ferreira, Daniel	1.94 m (6 ft 4 in)	92 kg (203 lb)	39 – 10 February 1987
C	12	(Brazil)	Santos, Patrick	2.04 m (6 ft 8 in)	110 kg (243 lb)	21 – 2 April 2005
PF	13	(Brazil)	Silva, Manel	2.00 m (6 ft 7 in)	95 kg (209 lb)	23 – 1 July 2003
C	18	(Brazil) (United States)	Doria, Lucas	2.00 m (6 ft 7 in)	110 kg (243 lb)	29 – 12 August 1997
PG	20	(Brazil)	Marum, Yan	1.88 m (6 ft 2 in)	86 kg (190 lb)	20 – 31 July 2006
PF	21	(Brazil)	Ferreira, Wesley	2.01 m (6 ft 7 in)	105 kg (231 lb)	30 – 15 October 1995
G	22	(United States)	Johnson, Shaquille	1.90 m (6 ft 3 in)	99 kg (218 lb)	36 – 11 April 1990
PF	23	(Brazil)	Manfio, Kayo	2.04 m (6 ft 8 in)	95 kg (209 lb)	28 – 10 June 1998
G/F	44	(Argentina)	Negrete, Alex	1.92 m (6 ft 4 in)		25 – 2 August 2001
PG	47	(Brazil)	Borges, Alexey	1.81 m (5 ft 11 in)	75 kg (165 lb)	30 – 8 October 1995
PF	91	(Brazil)	Milchevski, Lucas	1.98 m (6 ft 6 in)	95 kg (209 lb)	19 – 22 February 2007
PG	99	(Brazil)	dos Santos, Yago	1.73 m (5 ft 8 in)	80 kg (176 lb)	27 – 9 March 1999

Head coach

- (Argentina) Sergio Hernández "Oveja"

Assistant coach(es)

- (Brazil) Fernando Pereira
- (Brazil) Rodrigo Alves

Team manager

- (Brazil) Diego Jeleilate

Legend

- (C) Team captain
- (LDB) On assignment to LDB League
- (FA) Free Agent
- Injured

- Roster
Updated: 23 March 2025

=== Depth chart ===
Pos.	Starting 5	Bench	Bench 3
C	Wesley Ferreira	Lucas Doria
PF	Markeith Cummings	Kayo Gonçalves	Manel
SF	Shaquille Johnson	Alex Negrete
SG	Gui Deodato	Jhonatan Luz
PG	Alexey Borges	Franco Baralle	Yan Marun

== Season by season ==
Season	League	Regular season pos.	Postseason	Regular season	Playoffs	Americas League/BCLA	South American League
1990	CBB	3rd (group B)	Quarter-finals	6–4	1–2	not held	DNP
1991	CBB	DNP				not held	DNP
1992	CBB	DNP				not held	DNP
1993	CBB	DNP				not held	DNP
1994	CBB	DNP				not held	DNP
1995	CBB	5th (group B)	Round of 16	11–9	0–2	not held	DNP
1996	CBB	5th	Quarter-finals	13–9	1–2	not held	DNP
1997	CBB	7th	Quarter-finals	12–10	1–2	not held	DNP
1998	CBB	8th	Quarter-finals	13–13	1–2	not held	DNP
1999	CBB	4th	Quarter-finals	18–8	1–3	not held	DNP
2000	CBB	2nd	Runners-up	18–8	7–5	not held	DNP
2001	CBB	7th	Quarter-finals	19–11	1–3	not held	Semi-finals
2002	CBB	5th	Quarter-finals	21–11	0–3	not held	DNP
2003	CBB	7th	Quarter-finals	19–13	0–3	not held	
2004	CBB	2nd	Runners-up	22–8	6–5	not held	DNP
2005	CBB	DNP				not held	Group stage
2006	CBB	not held					DNP
2007	CBB	7th	Quarter-finals	12–11	0–3	not held	DNP
2008	CBB	1st	Champions	19–3	9–0	Group stage	Runners-up
2009	NBB	1st	Champions	26–2	9–2	Group stage	Champions
2009–10	NBB	2nd	Runners-up	20–6	8–4	DNP	Group stage
2010–11	NBB	4th	Semi-finals	20–8	3–4	Quarter-finals	Runners-up
2011–12	NBB	4th	Semi-finals	21–7	5–5	DNP	3rd
2012–13	NBB	1st	Champions	30–4	7–2	Quarter-finals	DNP
2013–14	NBB	1st	Champions	26–6	7–2	Champions	DNP
2014–15	NBB	3rd	Champions	23–7	8–2	3rd place	DNP
2015–16	NBB	1st	Champions	23–5	9–4	4th place	DNP
2016–17	NBB	1st	Quarter-finals	21–7	2–3	DNP^{1}	DNP
2017–18	NBB	1st	Semi-finals	25–3	4–3	DNP	Group stage
2018–19	NBB	2nd	Champions	22–4	9–3	DNP	Group stage
2019–20	NBB	Season not concluded due to the COVID-19 pandemic.		21–3	–	Runners-up	not held
2020–21	NBB	1st	Champions	28–2	8–0	Champions	not held
2021–22	NBB	2nd	Runners-up	26–6	7–3	Quarter-finals	DNP
2022–23	NBB	2nd	Semi-finals	28–4	3–4	Runners-up	DNP
2023–24	NBB	1st	Runners-up	31–5	9–3	Runners-up	DNP
NBB Totals	NBB	–		399–79	90–44	–	

^{1}Qualified but could not compete due to the suspension of the Brazilian Basketball Confederation by FIBA.

== Matches against NBA teams ==
See also List of games played between NBA and international teams

8 October 2014

Box Score

Phoenix Suns (United States)	100–88	(Brazil) Flamengo *
Scoring by quarter: 21–26, 33–17, 17–23, 29–20
Pts: Thomas 18; Rebs: Marc. Morris 7 Asts: Thomas 4		Pts: Marcelinho 16; Rebs: Felício 8 Asts: Laprovíttola 12

US Airways Center, Phoenix, Arizona
Attendance: 8,041

15 October 2014

Box Score

Orlando Magic (United States)	106–88	(Brazil) Flamengo
Scoring by quarter: 34–23, 21–26, 29–23, 22–16
Pts: Vučević 20; Rebs: Vučević 11; Asts: Ridnour 5		Pts: Marcelinho 20; Rebs: Olivinha 8 Asts: Laprovíttola 9

Amway Center, Orlando, Florida
Attendance: 13,734

17 October 2014

Box Score

Memphis Grizzlies (United States)	112–72	(Brazil) Flamengo
Scoring by quarter: 27–20, 35–21, 24–13, 24–18
Pts: Gasol 15; Rebs: Gasol and Randolph 8 Asts: Conley 7		Pts: Marcelinho 17; Rebs: Felício 7 Asts: Gegê 6

FedExForum, Memphis, Tennessee
Attendance: 10,969

17 October 2015

Box Score

** Flamengo (Brazil)	73–90	(United States) Orlando Magic
Scoring by quarter: 16–27, 18–24, 17–27, 22–12
Pts: Marcelinho 17; Rebs: Meyinsse and Luz 7 Asts: Marcelinho 5		Pts: Vučević 18; Rebs: Oladipo 9 Asts: Oladipo and Napier 3

HSBC Arena, Rio de Janeiro, Brazil
Attendance: 14,894

5 October 2018

Box Score

Orlando Magic (United States)	119–82	(Brazil) Flamengo
Scoring by quarter: 31–16, 36–27, 26–20, 26–19
Pts: Gordon 29; Rebs: Bamba 9 Asts: Grant 7		Pts: Marquinhos 19; Rebs: Varejao 12; Asts: Balbi 8

Amway Center, Orlando, Florida
Attendance: 14,667

20 October 2023

Box Score

Orlando Magic (United States)	109–76	(Brazil) Flamengo
Scoring by quarter: 30–14, 35–22, 20–20, 24–20
Pts: Queen 24; Rebs: Schofield 9 Asts: Black 5		Pts: Deodato 16; Rebs: Olivinha 9 Asts: Machado 6

Amway Center, Orlando, Florida
Attendance: 16,624

* First Brazilian team to play against an NBA team on North American soil.
** First Brazilian team to play against an NBA team on Brazilian soil.

== Honours ==
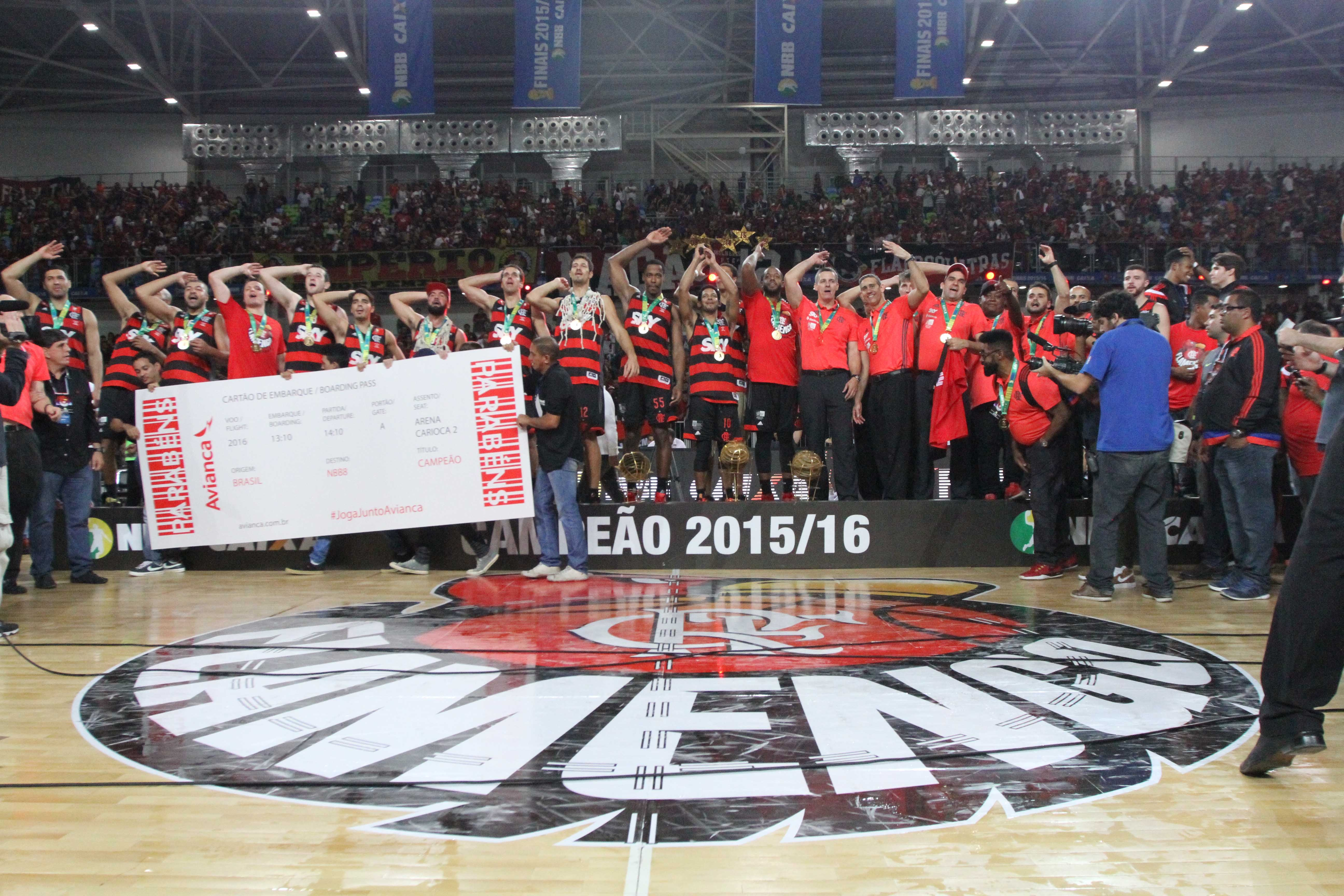
Flamengo celebrating their Brazilian NBB 2015–16 season championship

=== Worldwide ===
- FIBA Intercontinental Cup
  - Champions (2): 2014, 2022
  - Runners-up (1): 2019

=== Latin America ===
- FIBA Americas League / Champions League
  - Champions (3): 2014, 2020–21, 2024–25 (record)
  - Runners-up (1): 2020

=== Continental ===
- South American Championship of Champions Clubs
  - Champions (1): 1953
- FIBA South American League (LSB)
  - Champions (1): 2009 (I)
  - Runners-up (2): 2008, 2010

=== National ===
- Brazilian Championship (NBB)
  - Champions (7): 2009, 2012–13, 2013–14, 2014–15, 2015–16, 2018–19, 2020–21 (record)
  - Runners-up (1): 2009–10
- Brazilian Championship (CBB)
  - Champions (1): 2008
  - Runners-up (4): 1977, 1985, 2000, 2004
- Super 8 Cup
  - Champions (4): 2018, 2020–21, 2023–24, 2024–25 (record)
  - Runners-up (1): 2019–20

=== Inter-State ===
- Rio-São Paulo Championship
  - Champions (1): 1920

=== State ===
- Rio de Janeiro State Championship
  - Champions (49): 1932, 1933, 1934, 1935, 1948, 1949, 1951, 1952, 1953, 1954, 1955, 1956, 1957, 1958, 1959, 1960, 1962, 1964, 1975, 1977, 1982, 1984, 1985, 1986, 1990, 1994, 1995, 1996, 1998, 1999, 2002, 2005, 2006, 2007, 2008, 2009, 2010, 2011, 2012, 2013, 2014, 2015, 2016, 2018, 2019, 2020, 2021, 2022, 2023 (record)
  - Runners-up (12): 1950, 1963, 1976, 1981, 1983, 1987, 1988, 1989, 1991, 1997, 2001, 2003
- Rio de Janeiro City Championship
  - Champions (2): 1919, 1932

== Retired numbers ==
Flamengo Basketball retired numbers
N°	Nat.	Player	Position	Tenure	Date Retired
14	(Brazil)	Oscar Schmidt	SF	1999–2003	2003

== Notable players ==
Note: Flags indicate national team eligibility at FIBA-sanctioned events. Players may hold other non-FIBA nationalities not displayed.

Criteria

To appear in this section a player must have either:

- Set a club record or won an individual award while at the club
- Played at least one official international match for their national team at any time
- Played at least one official NBA match at any time.

Brazil:

- (Brazil) Affonso Évora
- (Brazil) Alfredo da Motta
- (Brazil) Algodão
- (Brazil) Carioquinha
- (Brazil) Fernando Brobró
- (Brazil) Hélio "Godinho"
- (Brazil) Marcelo Vido
- (Brazil) Marquinhos Leite
- (Brazil) Mário Hermes
- (Brazil) Maury de Souza
- (Brazil) Milton Setrini
- (Brazil) Paulinho Villas-Boas
- (Brazil) Ricardo Guimarães
- (Brazil) Sérgio Macarrão
- (Brazil) Waldir Boccardo
- (Brazil) Nilo Guimarães (1984–1985)
- (Brazil) Olívia (1995–1998, 2000–2004, 2005–2007)
- (Brazil) Pipoka (1998–2001)
- (Brazil) Ratto (1998–2001)
- (Brazil) Oscar Schmidt (1999–2003)
- (Brazil) Josuel dos Santos (1999–2005)
- (Brazil) Carlos Olivinha (2003–2009, 2012–)
- (Brazil) Duda Machado (2004, 2007–2013)
- (Brazil) Marcelinho Machado (2007–2018)
- (Brazil) Rafael Araújo (2009, 2010–2011)
- (Brazil) Gegê Chaia (2010–2011, 2012–2016)
- (Brazil) Caio Torres (2011–2013)
- (Brazil) Leandrinho Barbosa (2011)
- (Brazil) Marquinhos Vieira (2012–2021)
- (Brazil) Vítor Benite (2012–2015)
- (Brazil) Cristiano Felício (2013–2015)
- (Brazil) J.P. Batista (2015–2018, 2021–2022)
- (Brazil) Rafael Luz (2015–2016)
- (Brazil) Rafael Mineiro (2015–2017, 2018–2023)
- (Brazil) Ricardo Fischer (2016–2017, 2023)
- (Brazil) Anderson Varejão (2018–2019)
- (Brazil) Rafael Hettsheimeir (2020–2021)
- (Brazil) Yago dos Santos (2020–2022)
- (Brazil) Vítor Faverani (2021–2023)
- (Brazil) (United States) Scott Machado (2023–)

Argentina:

- (Argentina) Federico Kammerichs (2011–2012)
- (Argentina) Nicolás Laprovíttola (2013–2015)
- (Argentina) Walter Herrmann (2014–2015)
- (Argentina) Franco Balbi (2018–2022, 2023–2025)
- (Argentina) Luciano González (2020–2021)
- (Argentina) José Vildoza (2022–2023)
- (Argentina) Martín Cuello (2022–2024)
- (Argentina) Penka Aguirre (2022–2023)

Bahamas:

- (The Bahamas) David Nesbitt (2018–2019)

Dominican Republic:

- (Dominican Republic) Ronald Ramón (2016–2018)

Mexico:

- (Mexico) (United States) Luke Martínez (2020–2023)

United States:

- (United States) Marc Brown (1997–1998, 2003–2004)
- (United States) David Jackson (2011–2012)
- (United States) Jerome Meyinsse (2013–2016)
- (United States) M. J. Rhett (2017–2018)
- (United States) Brandon Robinson (2021–2022)
- (United States) (Jordan) Dar Tucker (2021–2022)

Venezuela:

- (Venezuela) David Cubillán (2017–2018)

== Franchise accomplishments and awards ==
=== Franchise leaders ===
Career Leaders
Category	Player	Statistics
Games played	Marcelinho Machado	183
Points	Marcelinho Machado	3,741
Rebounds	Carlos Olivinha	843
Assists	Marcelinho Machado	561
Steals	Marcelinho Machado	280
Blocks	Jerome Meyinsse	88
Field goals	Marcelinho Machado	1,178
Field Goal Percentage	–	–
3-Point Field Goals	Marcelinho Machado	637
3-Point Field Goal Percentage	David Jackson	.478
Free throws	Marcelinho Machado	748
Free Throw Percentage	David Jackson	.917
Points Per Game	Marcelinho Machado	20.2
Rebounds Per Game	Carlos Olivinha	7.1
Assists Per Game	Nicolás Laprovíttola	5.1
Steals Per Game	Marcelinho Machado	1.5
Blocks Per Game	Jerome Meyinsse	1.0
Triple Doubles	–	–
Personal Fouls	–	–
Turnovers	Marcelinho Machado	306

Season Leaders
Category	Player	Statistics	Season
Minutes played	Marquinhos Vieira	1,096	2012–2013
Points Per Game	Marcelinho Machado	27.3	2009–2010
Rebounds Per Game	Carlos Olivinha	8.7	2012–2013
Assists Per Game	Nicolás Laprovíttola	5.6	2014–2015
Steals Per Game	Marcelinho Machado	2.5	2009–2010
Blocks Per Game	Jerome Meyinsse	1.1	2014–2015
Triple Doubles	–	–	–
Points	Marcelinho Machado	735	2008–2009
Rebounds	Carlos Olivinha	297	2012–2013
Assists	Nicolás Laprovíttola	161	2014–2015
Steals	Marcelinho Machado	64	2009–2010
Blocks	Jerome Meyinsse	33	2014–2015
Field goals	Marquinhos Vieira	230	2012–2013
Field Goal Percentage	Jerome Meyinsse	.682	2013–2014
3-Point Field Goals	Marcelinho Machado	129	2010–2011
3-Point Field Goal Percentage	David Jackson	.478	2011–2012
Free throws	Marcelinho Machado	183	2008–2009
Free Throw Percentage	David Jackson	.917	2011–2012
Personal Fouls	–	–	–
Turnovers	Nicolás Laprovíttola	92	2014–2015

Single Game Records (Regular Season)
Category	Player	Statistics	Date
Points	Marcelinho Machado	63	7 March 2010
Minutes played	–	–	–
Rebounds	Caio Torres	17	31 January 2013
Assists	Marcelinho Machado	13	10 December 2011
Steals	Duda Machado	7	18 February 2009
Blocks	Átila Dos Santos; Jerome Meyinsse	4	27 January 2011; 21 November 2013/ 7 November 2014
Field goals made	Marcelinho Machado	21	7 March 2010
3-Point Field Goals	Marcelinho Machado	16	7 March 2010
Free throws	Marcelinho Machado; Marquinhos Vieira	16	1 May 2009; 13 December 2012
Turnovers	–	–	–

Single Game Records (Playoffs)
Category	Player	Statistics	Date
Points	Marcelinho Machado	41	28 May 2010
Minutes played	–	–	–
Rebounds	Marcelinho Machado	16	26 April 2010
Assists	Four players	9	–
Steals	Vítor Benite	6	22 April 2012
Blocks	Jerome Meyinsse	3	17 May 2014/ 26 May 2015
Field goals made	Marcelinho Machado	13	23 April 2010
3-Point Field Goals	Marcelinho Machado	10	28 May 2010
Free throws	Marcelinho Machado	17	14 June 2009
Turnovers	–	–	–

== Head coaches ==
- (Brazil) Togo Renan Soares "Kanela"
- (Brazil) Miguel Ângelo da Luz
- (Brazil) Zé Boquinha
- (Brazil) Paulo Sampaio "Chupeta" (2008–2011)
- (Argentina) Gonzalo García (2011–2012)
- (Brazil) José Alves Neto (2012–2018)
- (Brazil) Gustavo de Conti (2018–2025)
- (Argentina) Sergio Hernández "Oveja" (2025–Present)

=== NBB head coaches ===
Name	Nat.	Start	End	Totals				Regular season				Playoffs			
Name	Nat.	Start	End	G	W	L	PCT	G	W	L	PCT	G	W	L	PCT
Paulo Sampaio "Chupeta"	(Brazil)	2008	2011	112	86	26	.768	82	66	16	.805	30	20	10	.667
Gonzalo García	(Argentina)	2011	2012	38	26	12	.684	28	21	7	.750	10	5	5	.500
José Alves Neto	(Brazil)	2012	2018	233	185	48	.794	180	148	32	.822	53	37	16	.698
Gustavo de Conti	(Brazil)	2018	Present	177	152	25	.859	144	125	19	.868	33	27	6	.730
Totals				560	449	111	.802	434	360	74	.829	130	89	41	.685

== Flamengo Women's Basketball ==
=== Continental ===
- Tournament Chiclayo
  - Champions (1): 1966
- Tournament Lima
  - Champions (1): 1966
- Trophy Valladolid
  - Champions (1): 2001

=== National ===
- Piracicaba International Star Tournament
  - Champions (2): 1967, 1968

=== Regional ===
- State Championship
  - Champions (3): 1954, 1964, 1965
- FBERJ Cup
  - Winners (1): 1997
- Eugenie Borer Cup
  - Winners (1): 1997

== See also ==
- CR Flamengo
- CR Flamengo (women)
- Clube de Regatas do Flamengo (beach soccer)
- CR Flamengo (Superleague Formula team)
- Flamengo Esports
