= Youth Basketball Champions League Americas =

Pan-American basketball league

- Organising body: FIBA Americas
- Founded: 2026
- First season: 2026
- Country: FIBA Americas members
- Number of teams: 4
- Current champions: (Brazil) Paulistano (1st title) (2026)
- Most championships: (Brazil) Paulistano (1 title)
- 2026 Youth Basketball Champions League Americas

The Youth Basketball Champions League Americas (YBCL Americas) is a Pan-American basketball competition for men's junior teams organised by FIBA Americas. Teams can field players younger than 18 years old. The establishment of the league was announced in April 2026 and the inaugural season began in September 2026.

The inaugural 2026 season took place with four teams in Buenos Aires, Argentina, and was won by Paulistano. The second edition will take place in 2027 for which new national qualification rounds are announced by FIBA Americas.

FIBA Americas also plans to expand the tournament in future editions. Beginning in 2027, the competition is expected to expand to additional countries and introduce national qualification pathways, further increasing the reach and competitiveness of the event.

== Winners ==
| Season | Year | Host city | Final | | | Third and fourth place | | |
| Season | Year | Host city | Winners | Score | Second place | Third place | Score | Fourth place |
| 1 | 2026; Details | Buenos Aires | (Brazil) Paulistano | 74–69 | (Argentina) Obras Sanitarias | (Uruguay) Defensor Sporting | 78–73 | (United States) Academy of Central Florida |

== All-time participants ==
The following is a list of clubs who have played in the Youth Basketball Champions League at any time since its formation in 2023 to the current season.

| 1st | Champions |
| 2nd | Runners-up |
| 3rd | Third place |
| 4th | Fourth place |

| Team | 2026 | Total seasons | | |
|---|---|---|---|---|
| Team | (Argentina) Obras Sanitarias | Total seasons | 2nd place, silver medalist(s) | 1 |
| (Brazil) Paulistano | 1st place, gold medalist(s) | 1 | | |
| (United States) Academy of Central Florida | 4th | 1 | | |
| (Uruguay) Defensor Sporting | 3rd place, bronze medalist(s) | 1 | | |

== MVP ==
At the end of each season, FIBA Americas selects one most valuable player.

| Season | MVP | Ref. |
|---|---|---|
| 2026 | Pietro Melo (Paulistano) | |
