= 2026 Youth Basketball Champions League Americas =

Tournament details
- Host country: Argentina
- City: Buenos Aires
- Dates: 9 October – 12 October
- Teams: 4 (from FIBA Americas confederations) (from 42 federations)
- Venue: Estadio Obras Sanitarias (in 1 host city)

Final positions
- Champions: (Brazil) Paulistano (1st title)
- Runners-up: (Argentina) Obras Sanitarias
- Third place: (Uruguay) Defensor Sporting
- Fourth place: (United States) Academy of Central Florida

Tournament statistics
- Games played: 8
- MVP: (Brazil) Pietro Melo
- Top scorer: (Brazil) Pietro Melo (21.3 per game)
- Top rebounds: (Uruguay) Fabricio De Leon (10.8 per game)
- Top assists: (Argentina) Luka Garcia (6 per game)

The 2026 Youth Basketball Champions League Americas was the first edition of the YBCL Americas, a 4-team basketball tournament held at the Estadio Obras Sanitarias in the Argentine city of Buenos Aires between 9 and 12 October. Club Athletico Paulistano remained the first inaugural champion of the competition.

== Participating Clubs ==
Four clubs from Argentina, Brazil, the United States of America and Uruguay were confirmed and represented in the inaugural edition.

Clubs	Appearance
(Argentina) Obras Sanitarias	1st (host)
(Brazil) Club Athletico Paulistano	1st
(United States) Academy of Central Florida	1st
(Uruguay) Defensor Sporting	1st

== Host Selection ==
Obras Sanitarias (Argentina) were selected as the host club by FIBA Americas.

== Venue ==
- All matches are held at the Estadio Obras Sanitarias, Buenos Aires, Argentina.

Buenos Aires	2026 Youth Basketball Champions League Americas is located in Argentina
Estadio Obras Sanitarias	2026 Youth Basketball Champions League Americas is located in Argentina
34.545556°S 58.458056°W	2026 Youth Basketball Champions League Americas is located in Argentina
Capacity: 3,100	2026 Youth Basketball Champions League Americas is located in Argentina

== Group Stage ==
Pos	Team	Pld	W	L	PF	PA	PD	Pts	Qualification	PAU	OBR	ACF	DSC
1	(Brazilian Basketball Confederation) Paulistano	3	3	0	247	181	+66	6	Advance to Final	—	68–52	92–83	87–46
2	(Argentine Basketball Confederation) Obras Sanitarias (H)	3	2	1	210	200	+10	5	Advance to Final	52–68	—	82–76	76–56
3	(USA Basketball) Academy of Central Florida	3	1	2	256	239	+17	4	Advance to Third Place Play-Off	83–92	76–82	—	97–65
4	(Uruguayan Basketball Federation) Defensor Sporting	3	0	3	167	260	−93	3	Advance to Third Place Play-Off	46–87	56–76	65–97	—

Source: FIBA
Legend: Blue = home team win; Red = away team win.
(H) Hosts

== Final and Third Place Play-Off ==
Final
12 September
(Argentine Basketball Confederation) Obras Sanitarias	69
(Brazilian Basketball Confederation) Paulistano	74
Third Place Play-Off
12 September
(USA Basketball) Academy of Central Florida	58
(Uruguayan Basketball Federation) Defensor Sporting	61

== Individual awards ==
Award	Player	Club	Ref.
Most Valuable Player	(Brazil) Pietro Melo	(Brazil) Paulistano	
