= 2015 NBB All-Star Game =

The 2015 NBB All-Star Game was an exhibition basketball game that was played on March 7, 2015, at Ginásio Pedrocão in Franca, São Paulo, home of Franca Basquetebol Clube. This game was the 7th edition of the NBB All-Star Game and was played during the 2014–15 NBB season. Frnaca was awarded for the third time to host the All-Star Game in an announcement by president Cássio Roque on February 6, 2015.

The teams were formed by Brazilian players, called NBB Brasil (NBB Brazil), and by foreign players, called NBB Mundo (NBB World). The twelve players of each team were selected by the trade press, the teams' captains and coaches. Starters for the game were selected by the fans, who could select one guard, two forwards and two centers for each team.

== All-Star Game ==
=== Coaches ===
Demétrius Ferraciú, coach of Minas, and Paco García, coach of the Mogi das Cruzes, were selected as the NBB Brasil and NBB Mundo head coach, respectively. Guerrinha, from Bauru, was selected as the NBB Brasil assistant coach; while Dedé Barbosa, from Limeira, was selected as the NBB Mundo assistant coach.

=== Roster ===
NBB Brasil
Pos	Player	Team	No. of selections
Starters
G	Ricardo Fischer	Bauru	2
G	Alex Garcia	Bauru	7
F	Marquinhos	Flamengo	5
F	Lucas Cipolini	Brasília	3
C	Rafael Hettsheimeir^{INJ}	Bauru	1
Reserves
G	Nezinho dos Santos	Limeira	5
G	Henrique Coelho	Minas	1
G	Arlindo Neto	Palmeiras	2
F	Léo Meindl	Franca	2
F	Jefferson William^{INJ}	Bauru	4
C	Caio Torres^{INJ}	São José	3
C	Lucas Mariano^{ST}	Franca	1
F	Audrei Parisotto^{REP1}	Uberlândia	1
C	Rafael Mineiro^{REP2}	Limeira	3
F	Guilherme Giovannoni^{REP3}	Brasília	6
Head coach: Demétrius Ferraciú (Minas)

NBB Mundo
Pos	Player	Team	No. of selections
Starters
G	(Argentina) Maxi Stanic	Palmeiras	1
G	(United States) Shamell Stallworth	Mogi das Cruzes	7
F	(United States) David Jackson	Limeira	3
F	(United States) Tyrone Curnell	Mogi das Cruzes	3
C	(United States) Jerome Meyinsse	Flamengo	2
Reserves
G	(Argentina) Nico Laprovíttola	Flamengo	2
G	(United States) Kenny Dawkins	Paulistano	3
G	(United States) Robby Collum	Minas	2
F	(United States) Desmond Holloway	Paulistano	3
F	(Argentina) Marcos Mata	Franca	1
F	(Argentina) Walter Herrmann	Flamengo	1
C	(United States) Steven Toyloy	Palmeiras	3
Head coach: Paco García (Mogi das Cruzes)

- INJ Hettsheimeir, Jefferson and Caio Torres were unable to participate due to injuries.
- REP1 Audrei was named as Jefferson's replacement.
- REP2 Rafael Mineiro was named as Caio Torres' replacement.
- REP3 Giovannoni was named as Hettsheimeir's replacement.
- ST Lucas Mariano was chosen to start the game in place of the injured Hettsheimeir.

=== Game ===
SporTV

March 7, 2015
16:00 (UTC−03:00)

Report

NBB Brasil 131, NBB Mundo 110
Scoring by quarter: 38–18, 21–44, 40–23, 32–25
Pts: Fischer 26; Rebs: Giovannoni 7 Asts: Fischer 13	Pts: Shamell 23; Rebs: Laprovíttola 6 Asts: Laprovíttola 7

Ginásio Pedrocão, Franca, São Paulo
Referees: Fernando Serpa, Marcos Ferreira, Jacob Barreto

Ricardo Fischer set a game-high in points, with 26 points, and assists, with 13 assists. Those numbers granted him a number of 42 in efficiency and the NBB All-Star Game Most Valuable Player award.

== All-Star Weekend ==
=== Shooting Stars Competition ===
In the 7th edition of NBB All-Star Game, it was the second time that the Shooting Stars Competition of Brazilian basketball was disputed. Four teams were formed, each of them containing one NBB's player, one retired male player and one female player. For the edition, LNB selected the players who were Liga de Basquete Feminino (LBF).

The mechanics of dispute Shooting Stars Competition. Each group of three players has to transform seven shots from different positions of the court, the last of them being half-court. The maximum time for each triplet closed the circuit for two minutes. The two fastest times qualified for the decision of the competition.

Team Name	Members	Team	First round	Final round
Team Chuí	Helinho	Franca	24.0	56.0
Team Chuí	Adrianinha	América (LBF)	24.0	56.0
Team Chuí	Chuí	Retired player	24.0	56.0
Team Fausto	Marquinhos	Flamengo	43.7	1.03
Team Fausto	Clarissa dos Santos	Americana (LBF)	43.7	1.03
Team Fausto	Fausto Giannechini	Retired player	43.7	1.03
Team Edu Mineiro	Guilherme Giovannoni	Brasília	54.1	-
Team Edu Mineiro	Érika de Souza	América (LBF)	54.1	-
Team Edu Mineiro	Edu Mineiro	Retired player	54.1	-
Team Paulão	Larry Taylor	Bauru	56.5	-
Team Paulão	Damiris Dantas	Americana (LBF)	56.5	-
Team Paulão	Paulão Berger	Retired player	56.5	-
Team Robertão	David Jackson	Limeira	1.45	-
Team Robertão	Isabela Ramona	São José (LBF)	1.45	-
Team Robertão	Robertão	Retired player	1.45	-

=== Skills Challenge ===
The Skills Challenge, which was played for the fourth time, had the presence of three times champion Nezinho, from Limeira, the forward Léo Meindl, from the host team Franca, and seven more competitors which was determined by the LNB Technical Department.

Player	First round	Finals
Thiaguinho (Liga Sorocabana)	24.5	27.1
Maxi Stanic (Palmeiras)	27.2	27.3
Desmond Holloway (Paulistano)	29.0	
Léo Meindl (Franca)	30.7	
Nezinho (Limeira)	31.6	
Henrique Coelho (Minas)	38.4	
Davi Rossetto (Basquete Cearense)	39.8	
Ricardo Fischer (Bauru)	44.1	

=== Three-Point Tournament ===
The tournament had six competitors for the title. The champion of previous season Marcelinho Machado, from Flamengo, and Marcos Mata, from the host city team, had already been secured in the dispute and its six rivals, with four of this five players being the four greatest three-point shooters. The veteran forward won his second title in a row after setting a number of 20 three-pointers in the first round and matching in the final his own and tournament history record of 23 three-pointers, so defeating the point guard Eric Tatu, from Rio Claro Basquete. He also became the most winner of the tournament, alongside the forward Fernando Fischer, who won his two titles while he was playing for Bauru.

Player	First round	Finals
Marcelinho (Flamengo)	20	23
Eric Tatu (Rio Claro)	22	10
Lucas Dias (Pinheiros)	17	
Filipin (Mogi das Cruzes)	17	
Ronald Ramón (Limeira)	16	
Robert Day (Bauru)	13	
Jamaal (Macaé)	12	
Marcos Mata (Franca)	6	

=== Dunk Tournament ===
For Dunk Tournament, the host team, Franca, was represented by the center André Coimbra. The other challengers to the title was defined after being evaluated by a jury of personalities from basketball. As a result of the partnership between Liga Nacional de Basquete and National Basketball Association, the greatest basketball league in the world, one of the jurors was the former forward/center Horace Grant, three times NBA champion with the Chicago Bulls and once NBA champion with the Los Angeles Lakers.

Player	First round	Finals	Tiebreak
André Coimbra (Franca)	99 (49+50)	50	99 (49+50)
Max Ribeiro (Brasília)	98 (48+50)	50	98 (49+49)
Gérson (Mogi das Cruzes)	88 (43+45)		
O'Neal Mims (Uberlândia)	79 (47+32)		
