= 2014–15 NBB season =

NBB 2014–15
- League: Novo Basquete Brasil
- Sport: Basketball
- Duration: October 2014–May 2015
- Teams: 16
- TV partner: SporTV Rede Globo

NBB season
- Champions: Flamengo

NBB seasons
- ← 2013–14 2015–16 →

The 2014–15 NBB season was the 7th season of the Novo Basquete Brasil, the Brazilian basketball league. Once again this tournament was organized entirely by the Liga Nacional de Basquete (LNB). The NBB also qualified teams for international tournaments such as Liga Sudamericana and FIBA Americas League.

This season sixteen teams were played each other in the regular season. At the end of the home and away matches round the top four teams qualified for the quarterfinals of the playoffs automatically, while the teams finishing in the 5th and 12th place participated in the first round of the playoffs to determine the other four teams in the quarterfinals, in a five-match series. This year NBB returned to a series in the Finals, played in a best of three-match.

For this season, only the last regular season placed was relegated to the Liga Ouro, the NBB second division. The Liga Ouro winner receive the right to contest NBB in the next year.

== Participating teams ==
New teams in the league

- Rio Claro Basquete (2014 Liga Ouro champions, promoted)

Teams that left the league

- Universo/Goiânia (16th place in the 2013–14 regular season, relegated)
- Espírito Santo Basquetebol (17th place in the 2013–14 regular season, relegated)

Team	Home city	Stadium	Capacity	Head coach	Appearance	Last season
Basquete Cearense	Fortaleza	Ginásio da UNIFOR; Ginásio Paulo Sarasate	2,200; 8,200	(Brazil) Alberto Bial	3rd	11th
Paschoalotto/Bauru	Bauru	Ginásio Panela de Pressão	2,000	(Brazil) Guerrinha	7th	7th
UniCEUB/BRB/Brasília	Brasília	Ginásio da ASCEB; Ginásio Nilson Nelson	3,050; 16,000	(Brazil) José Carlos Vidal	7th	5th
Flamengo	Rio de Janeiro	Ginásio Álvaro Vieira Lima; HSBC Arena; Maracanãzinho	4,500; 15,000; 11,800	(Brazil) José Alves Neto	7th	1st
Vivo/Franca	Franca	Ginásio Pedrocão	6,000	(Brazil) Lula Ferreira	7th	8th
Liga Sorocabana	Sorocaba	Ginásio Gualberto Moreira	3,000	(Brazil) Rinaldo Rodrigues	4th	14th
Winner/Limeira	Limeira	Ginásio Vô Lucato	1,800	(Brazil) Dedé Barbosa	6th	6th
Macaé Basquete	Macaé	Tênis Clube de Macaé; Ginásio Maurício Soares Bittencourt	3,000; 6,000	(Brazil) Léo Costa	2nd	13th
Minas Tênis Clube	Belo Horizonte	Arena Minas	4,000	(Brazil) Demétrius Ferracciú	7th	15th
Mogi das Cruzes/Helbor	Mogi das Cruzes	Ginásio Municipal Professor Hugo Ramos	5,000	(Spain) Paco García	3rd	4th
Palmeiras/Meltex	São Paulo	Ginásio Palestra Itália	1,500	(Brazil) Régis Marrelli	3rd	12th
Paulistano/Unimed	São Paulo	Ginásio Antônio Prado Junior	1,500	(Brazil) Gustavo de Conti	7th	2nd
Pinheiros/Sky	São Paulo	Poliesportivo Henrique Villaboim	854	(Brazil) Marcel de Souza	7th	9th
Rio Claro Basquete	Rio Claro	Ginásio de Esportes Felipe Karam	3,000	(Brazil) Marcelo Tamião	1st	1st (Liga Ouro)
São José/Unimed	São José dos Campos	Ginásio Lineu de Moura	2,620	(Brazil) Luiz Zanon	7th	3rd
Unitri/Pilhas Energizer/Uberlândia	Uberlândia	Arena Multiuso Tancredo Neves	6,000	(Argentina) Carlos Romano	5th	10th

Locations of the 2014–15 NBB teams

== Head coach changes ==
Pre-season changes

Team	Outgoing coach	Manner of departure	Replaced by	Date of appointment
Pinheiros	(Brazil) Claudio Mortari	Moved to team's supervisor	(Brazil) Marcel de Souza	May 17, 2014
Limeira	(Brazil) Demétrius Ferracciú	Transferred to Minas	(Brazil) Dedé Barbosa	July 8, 2014
Brasília	(Argentina) Sergio Hernández	End of contract	(Brazil) José Carlos Vidal	July 25, 2014
Palmeiras	(Brazil) Hebert Coimbra	End of contract	(Brazil) Régis Marrelli	September 15, 2014
Rio Claro	(Brazil) Marcelo Tamião	Moved to team's supervisor	(Brazil) Chuí	October 2, 2014

Mid-season changes

Team	Outgoing coach	Manner of departure	Replaced by	Date of appointment
Rio Claro	(Brazil) Chuí	Sacked	(Brazil) Marcelo Tamião	January 14, 2015
Uberlândia	(Spain) Arturo Álvarez	Sacked	(Argentina) Carlos Romano	January 19, 2015

== Regular season ==
=== League table ===
Pos	Team	Pld	W	L	PF	PA	PD	Pts	Qualification or relegation
1	Bauru	30	28	2	2723	2263	+460	58	Quarterfinals Playoffs
2	Limeira	30	25	5	2483	2299	+184	55	Quarterfinals Playoffs
3	Flamengo	30	23	7	2602	2302	+300	53	Quarterfinals Playoffs
4	Mogi das Cruzes	30	21	9	2547	2447	+100	51	Quarterfinals Playoffs
5	Minas	30	17	13	2267	2228	+39	47	First Round Playoffs
6	Paulistano	30	17	13	2464	2391	+73	47	First Round Playoffs
7	Pinheiros	30	16	14	2387	2397	−10	46	First Round Playoffs
8	Franca	30	14	16	2294	2314	−20	44	First Round Playoffs
9	Palmeiras	30	13	17	2323	2378	−55	43	First Round Playoffs
10	Brasília	30	12	18	2469	2524	−55	42	First Round Playoffs
11	São José	30	12	18	2344	2433	−89	42	First Round Playoffs
12	Macaé Basquete	30	9	21	2370	2523	−153	39	First Round Playoffs
13	Uberlândia	30	9	21	2254	2471	−217	39	
14	Basquete Cearense	30	8	22	2299	2521	−222	38	
15	Rio Claro	30	8	22	2376	2535	−159	38	
16	Liga Sorocabana	30	8	22	2350	2526	−176	38	Relegation to Liga Ouro

Source: LNB – NBB

=== Results ===
	BCE	BAU	BRA	FLA	FRA	LSB	LIM	MAC	MIN	MOG	PAL	PAU	PIN	RCB	SJO	UBE
Basquete Cearense		67–109	96–84	63–89	78–91	90–78	67–85	76–82	71–65	80–91	83–65	69–77	85–91	68–60	70–76	80–62
Bauru	99–81		83–86	92–84	82–70	97–80	90–89	85–69	89–71	97–75	85–77	81–74	116–55	106–74	104–96	87–64
Brasília	81–68	74–85		95–106	74–62	84–76	83–87	80–77	75–77	86–88	89–62	86–94	106–105	73–85	79–78	87–90
Flamengo	106–73	77–84	76–74		82–79	98–73	86–70	103–78	77–59	87–83	81–77	97–81	0–20 †	99–74	93–88	91–58
Franca	90–66	73–79	81–73	72–80		82–55	86–92	74–66	66–69	74–78	80–74	76–81	81–68	72–61	80–65	70–62
Liga Sorocabana	86–82	71–110	91–76	92–97	88–67		83–85	96–73	65–84	85–87	102–81	78–76	88–96	75–68	70–78	70–82
Limeira	89–84	77–71	86–69	78–73	100–74	85–73		87–66	66–62	82–72	76–64	89–80	72–86	95–90	82–71	83–64
Macaé Basquete	78–77	85–93	68–86	86–84	78–79	80–73	79–81		85–87	89–95	77–72	76–69	95–91	92–94	103–105	79–72
Minas	90–63	79–84	79–87	78–76	83–69	89–80	72–85	73–63		66–76	68–73	72–69	87–110	82–70	91–76	75–66
Mogi das Cruzes	80–84	80–99	108–99	94–98	80–82	89–82	98–82	81–70	60–61		85–84	88–77	83–75	93–80	88–89	90–80
Palmeiras	94–87	65–77	86–70	85–89	96–90	83–78	79–69	83–67	76–80	68–84		73–68	67–74	101–98	99–86	79–68
Paulistano	86–78	89–90	89–81	91–99	88–79	83–69	84–85	82–76	62–83	74–76	92–73		84–68	94–89	89–71	78–59
Pinheiros	97–81	69–89	95–82	68–89	87–67	85–79	61–73	99–69	89–78	81–88	65–79	89–93		67–71	72–70	107–86
Rio Claro	92–83	65–82	89–98	85–93	68–75	82–70	78–87	85–105	73–68	77–82	72–75	87–90	70–84		79–66	91–100
São José	70–78	71–90	67–78	71–94	94–83	91–72	73–77	80–79	71–64	79–89	56–55	77–88	89–70	76–75		80–52
Uberlândia	78–71	76–88	91–74	101–98	67–70	66–72	81–89	81–80	56–75	80–86	82–78	77–82	80–83	84–94	90–84	

Source: NBB Fixtures
|}

Notes:

- † Flamengo was punished by the LNB due to problems in the Ginásio Álvaro Vieira Lima and Pinheiros was declared the winner by 20–0 (walkover).

== NBB All-Star Weekend ==
For the third time in history the All-Star Weekend was played at Ginásio Pedrocão in Franca, São Paulo on March 6–7, 2015. In the first day of the event, it was disputed the "Dunk Tournament", "Three-Point Tournament", "Skills Challenge" and "Shooting Stars Competition". The NBB All-Star Game was played on the following day with NBB Brasil defeated NBB Mundo for the fourth straight year (131–110).

== Playoffs ==
First Round (Best-of-5)
(8) Franca	3
(9) Palmeiras	2
(5) Minas	1
(12) Macaé Basquete	3
(7) Pinheiros	1
(10) Brasília	3
(6) Paulistano	1
(11) São José	3

Quarterfinals (Best-of-5)
(1) Bauru	3
(8) Franca	2
(4) Mogi das Cruzes	3
(12) Macaé Basquete	2
(2) Limeira	3
(10) Brasília	1
(3) Flamengo	3
(11) São José	2

Semifinals (Best-of-5)
(1) Bauru	3
(4) Mogi das Cruzes	2
(2) Limeira	0
(3) Flamengo	3

Final (Best-of-3)
(1) Bauru	0
(3) Flamengo	2

=== First round ===
==== (5) Minas vs. (12) Macaé Basquete ====
Game 1

April 10, 2015
19:30 UTC−03:00

Report

Minas 90, Macaé Basquete 78
Scoring by quarter: 16–21, 23–12, 24–15, 27–30
Pts: Siqueira 20; Rebs: Ansaloni 9 Asts: Coelho 7	Pts: Jamaal 24; Rebs: George 9 Asts: Jamaal 3

Arena Minas, Belo Horizonte, Minas Gerais
Attendance: 456
Referees: Guilherme Locatelli, José Pelissari, Bruno Oliveira

Game 2

April 12, 2015
17:00 UTC−03:00

Report

Minas 80, Macaé Basquete 81 (OT)
Scoring by quarter: 7–13, 8–22, 26–15, 30–21, Overtime: 9–10
Pts: Siqueira 26; Rebs: Shilton 13; Asts: Siqueira 5	Pts: Jamaal 23; Rebs: Mineiro 9 Asts: Jamaal 4

Arena Minas, Belo Horizonte, Minas Gerais
Attendance: 345
Referees: Marcos Benito, Fábio Kover, Gustavo Mathias

Game 3

April 15, 2015
19:30 UTC−03:00

Report

Macaé Basquete 91, Minas 62
Scoring by quarter: 19–24, 18–8, 28–13, 26–17
Pts: three players 14; Rebs: George 9 Asts: Mineiro 6	Pts: Siqueira 15; Rebs: Shilton 5 Asts: Siqueira, Coelho 3

Tênis Clube de Macaé, Macaé, Rio de Janeiro
Attendance: 1,665
Referees: Cristiano Maranho, Andreia Silva, Leonardo Sehnem

Game 4

April 17, 2015
19:30 UTC−03:00

Report

Macaé Basquete 92, Minas 86
Scoring by quarter: 23–21, 26–17, 21–24, 22–24
Pts: Jamaal 30; Rebs: Mineiro 8 Asts: three players 3	Pts: Siqueira 17; Rebs: Shilton 6 Asts: Coelho 8
Macaé Basquete wins series, 3–1

Tênis Clube de Macaé, Macaé, Rio de Janeiro
Attendance: 1,935
Referees: Guilherme Locatelli, Marcos Ferreira, Diego Chiconato

==== (6) Paulistano vs. (11) São José ====
Game 1

April 7, 2015
19:30 UTC−03:00

Report

Paulistano 75, São José 76
Scoring by quarter: 21–22, 18–19, 21–15, 15–20
Pts: Pedro 18; Rebs: Pilar 10; Asts: Pilar, Dawkins 3	Pts: Baxter 17; Rebs: Torres 10; Asts: Baxter, Valtinho 4

Ginásio Antônio Prado Junior, São Paulo, São Paulo
Attendance: 438
Referees: Jacob Barreto, Francisco Lima Filho, Fabiano Huber

Game 2

April 9, 2015
19:30 UTC−03:00

Report

Paulistano 72, São José 67
Scoring by quarter: 24–15, 14–17, 11–23, 23–12
Pts: Dawkins 21; Rebs: Dawkins 9 Asts: Dawkins 4	Pts: Torres 21; Rebs: Laws 9 Asts: Valtinho 5

Ginásio Antônio Prado Junior, São Paulo, São Paulo
Attendance: 642
Referees: Guilherme Locatelli, Marcos Ferreira, Davi Souza

Game 3

April 13, 2015
20:00 UTC−03:00

Report

São José 85, Paulistano 74
Scoring by quarter: 11–21, 21–18, 30–20, 23–15
Pts: Dedé 18; Rebs: three players 6 Asts: Valtinho 4	Pts: Dawkins, Carbonari 17; Rebs: Dawkins, Carbonari 5 Asts: Dawkins 8

Ginásio Lineu de Moura, São José dos Campos, São Paulo
Attendance: 1,510
Referees: José Pelissari, Diego Chiconato, Andreia Silva

Game 4

April 15, 2015
20:00 UTC−03:00

Report

São José 74, Paulistano 65
Scoring by quarter: 19–21, 16–20, 19–15, 20–9
Pts: Baxter 18; Rebs: Torres 13; Asts: Laws 5	Pts: Pilar 13; Rebs: Holloway, Carbonari 8 Asts: Dawkins 3
São José wins series, 3–1

Ginásio Lineu de Moura, São José dos Campos, São Paulo
Attendance: 1,570
Referees: Guilherme Locatelli, Jonas Pereira, Fabiano Huber

==== (7) Pinheiros vs. (10) Brasília ====
Game 1

April 9, 2015
17:00 UTC−03:00

Report

Pinheiros 91, Brasília 95
Scoring by quarter: 28–27, 22–24, 18–26, 23–18
Pts: Jo. Smith 27; Rebs: Felipe 7 Asts: Jo. Smith 7	Pts: Giovannoni 23; Rebs: Ronald 11; Asts: LaMonte 3

Poliesportivo Henrique Villaboim, São Paulo, São Paulo
Attendance: 237
Referees: Cristiano Maranho, Joaquins Feitosa Neto, Bruno Oliveira

Game 2

April 11, 2015
20:30 UTC−03:00

Report

Pinheiros 96, Brasília 90
Scoring by quarter: 25–18, 14–26, 30–27, 27–19
Pts: Ja. Smith 30; Rebs: Bambu 8 Asts: Jo. Smith 12	Pts: Ronald 15; Rebs: Cipolini 9 Asts: Fúlvio 5

Poliesportivo Henrique Villaboim, São Paulo, São Paulo
Attendance: 394
Referees: Marcos Benito, Jacob Barreto, Maurício Serour

Game 3

April 14, 2015
21:30 UTC−03:00

Report

Brasília 82, Pinheiros 76
Scoring by quarter: 25–19, 26–17, 14–19, 17–21
Pts: LaMonte 30; Rebs: Arthur 6 Asts: Fúlvio 5	Pts: Jo. Smith 22; Rebs: Toledo 7 Asts: Jo. Smith 4

Ginásio da ASCEB, Brasília, Federal District
Attendance: 575
Referees: Fernando Serpa, Jonas Pereira, Diego Chiconato

Game 4

April 16, 2015
20:00 UTC−03:00

Report

Brasília 93, Pinheiros 81
Scoring by quarter: 27–19, 24–16, 24–24, 18–22
Pts: Giovannoni 23; Rebs: Giovannoni 10; Asts: Fúlvio 7	Pts: Toledo, Campos 17; Rebs: Toledo 8 Asts: Jo. Smith 5
Brasília wins series, 3–1

Ginásio da ASCEB, Brasília, Federal District
Attendance: 1,025
Referees: Cristiano Maranho, José Pelissari, Fabiano Huber

==== (8) Franca vs. (9) Palmeiras ====
Game 1

April 8, 2015
20:00 UTC−03:00

Report

Franca 79, Palmeiras 74
Scoring by quarter: 14–7, 18–27, 21–23, 26–17
Pts: Helinho 24; Rebs: Mata 10; Asts: Meindl, Mata 4	Pts: Gianella 21; Rebs: Diego 7 Asts: Stanic 9

Ginásio Pedrocão, Franca, São Paulo
Attendance: 1,176
Referees: Fernando Serpa, Andreia Silva, Eduardo Albano

Game 2

April 10, 2015
19:30 UTC−03:00

Report

Franca 81, Palmeiras 64
Scoring by quarter: 24–11, 21–18, 16–11, 20–24
Pts: Mata 22; Rebs: Mata 9 Asts: Mata 6	Pts: Stanic 13; Rebs: Átila 7 Asts: Gianella, Neto 5

Ginásio Pedrocão, Franca, São Paulo
Attendance: 1,506
Referees: Cristiano Maranho, Maurício Serour, Leandro Sehnem

Game 3

April 14, 2015
20:00 UTC−03:00

Report

Palmeiras 80, Franca 73
Scoring by quarter: 20–16, 16–12, 25–22, 19–23
Pts: Neto 20; Rebs: Stanic 7 Asts: Stanic 9	Pts: Mariano 20; Rebs: Meindl 5 Asts: Figueroa 9

Ginásio Palestra Itália, São Paulo, São Paulo
Attendance: 1,062
Referees: Marcos Benito, Marcos Ferreira, Fabiano Huber

Game 4

April 16, 2015
20:00 UTC−03:00

Report

Palmeiras 63, Franca 56
Scoring by quarter: 12–8, 14–21, 22–10, 15–17
Pts: Neto 16; Rebs: Jhonatan 6 Asts: Stanic 7	Pts: Meindl 15; Rebs: Mata 10; Asts: Figueroa 3

Ginásio Palestra Itália, São Paulo, São Paulo
Attendance: 1,314
Referees: Fernando Serpa, Guilherme Locatelli, Leandro Sehnem

Game 5

April 19, 2015
11:00 UTC−03:00

Report

Franca 73, Palmeiras 64
Scoring by quarter: 25–19, 15–6, 14–23, 19–16
Pts: Mariano 23; Rebs: Mariano 12; Asts: Figueroa 7	Pts: Gianella 14; Rebs: Toyloy 8 Asts: Gianella 5
Franca wins series, 3–2

Ginásio Pedrocão, Franca, São Paulo
Attendance: 2,444
Referees: Cristiano Maranho, José Pelissari, Jacob Barreto

=== Quarterfinals ===
==== (1) Bauru vs. (8) Franca ====
Game 1

April 24, 2015
19:30 UTC−03:00

Report

Bauru 82, Franca 55
Scoring by quarter: 19–18, 19–12, 20–9, 24–16
Pts: Murilo 17; Rebs: Hettsheimeir 14; Asts: Garcia 6	Pts: Meindl 15; Rebs: Meindl 8 Asts: Figueroa 5

Ginásio Panela de Pressão, Bauru, São Paulo
Attendance: 1,320
Referees: Guilherme Locatelli, Marcos Ferreira, Maurício Serour

Game 2

April 26, 2015
19:00 UTC−03:00

Report

Bauru 71, Franca 74
Scoring by quarter: 13–19, 26–17, 16–19, 16–19
Pts: Hettsheimeir 23; Rebs: Hettsheimeir 7 Asts: Fischer 5	Pts: Mata 26; Rebs: Mata 11; Asts: Figueroa 8

Ginásio Panela de Pressão, Bauru, São Paulo
Attendance: 1,469
Referees: José Pelissari, Marcos Benito, Gustavo Mathias

Game 3

April 30, 2015
20:00 UTC−03:00

Report

Franca 67, Bauru 75
Scoring by quarter: 18–14, 9–25, 28–17, 12–19
Pts: Mariano 16; Rebs: Meindl 8 Asts: Figueroa 8	Pts: Garcia 23; Rebs: Hettsheimeir 11; Asts: Garcia 4

Ginásio Pedrocão, Franca, São Paulo
Attendance: 3,547
Referees: Cristiano Maranho, Fabiano Huber, Maria Cláudia Moraes

Game 4

May 2, 2015
17:00 UTC−03:00

Report

Franca 78, Bauru 67
Scoring by quarter: 17–15, 16–12, 25–23, 20–17
Pts: Meindl 20; Rebs: Mata 7 Asts: Figueroa 6	Pts: Hettsheimeir 21; Rebs: Deodato 6 Asts: Fischer 8

Ginásio Pedrocão, Franca, São Paulo
Attendance: 3,196
Referees: Fernando Serpa, Jacob Barreto, Diego Chiconato

Game 5

May 5, 2015
19:00 UTC−03:00

Report

Bauru 78, Franca 72
Scoring by quarter: 17–21, 21–15, 23–16, 17–20
Pts: Hettsheimeir 24; Rebs: three players 9 Asts: Fischer 10	Pts: Mariano 16; Rebs: Mariano, Mata 8 Asts: Figueroa 8
Bauru wins series, 3–2

Ginásio Panela de Pressão, Bauru, São Paulo
Attendance: 1,896
Referees: Cristiano Maranho, Marcos Ferreira, Fabiano Huber

==== (4) Mogi das Cruzes vs. (12) Macaé Basquete ====
Game 1

April 23, 2015
20:00 UTC−03:00

Report

Mogi das Cruzes 84, Macaé Basquete 72
Scoring by quarter: 13–17, 21–20, 21–18, 29–17
Pts: Filipin 23; Rebs: Curnell 8 Asts: Elinho 5	Pts: Mineiro, Jamaal 14; Rebs: Eddy, Márcio 6 Asts: Jamaal, Eddy 4

Ginásio Professor Hugo Ramos, Mogi das Cruzes, São Paulo
Attendance: 3,180
Referees: Guilherme Locatelli, Diego Chiconato, Bruno Oliveira

Game 2

April 25, 2015
21:20 UTC−03:00

Report

Mogi das Cruzes 84, Macaé Basquete 89
Scoring by quarter: 25–27, 16–17, 27–16, 16–29
Pts: Filipin, Shamell 20; Rebs: Prestes 7 Asts: Elinho 3	Pts: Jamaal 27; Rebs: Atílio 8 Asts: three players 3

Ginásio Professor Hugo Ramos, Mogi das Cruzes, São Paulo
Attendance: 4,381
Referees: Fernando Serpa, Fábio Kover, Andreia Silva

Game 3

April 29, 2015
19:30 UTC−03:00

Report

Macaé Basquete 78, Mogi das Cruzes 69
Scoring by quarter: 25–13, 16–14, 15–23, 22–19
Pts: Jamaal 18; Rebs: Atílio 7 Asts: Atílio 5	Pts: Filipin 21; Rebs: Wagner 10; Asts: three players 2

Tênis Clube de Macaé, Macaé, Rio de Janeiro
Attendance: 2,040
Referees: Cristiano Maranho, Marcos Ferreira, Maurício Serour

Game 4

May 1, 2015
19:30 UTC−03:00

Report

Macaé Basquete 73, Mogi das Cruzes 91
Scoring by quarter: 21–16, 12–28, 24–32, 16–15
Pts: Eddy 17; Rebs: George 6 Asts: Eddy 5	Pts: Shamell 32; Rebs: Curnell 11; Asts: Elinho 4

Tênis Clube de Macaé, Macaé, Rio de Janeiro
Attendance: 2,159
Referees: José Pelissari, Marcos Benito, Fabiano Huber

Game 5

May 4, 2015
20:00 UTC−03:00

Report

Mogi das Cruzes 91, Macaé Basquete 84
Scoring by quarter: 15–20, 20–14, 26–30, 30–20
Pts: Curnell 21; Rebs: Curnell 8 Asts: Shamell 3	Pts: Jamaal 24; Rebs: Mineiro 6 Asts: Eddy, Pedrinho 3
Mogi das Cruzes wins series, 3–2

Ginásio Professor Hugo Ramos, Mogi das Cruzes, São Paulo
Referees: Cristiano Maranho, Guilherme Locatelli, Marcos Ferreira

==== (2) Limeira vs. (10) Brasília ====
Game 1

April 22, 2015
20:00 UTC−03:00

Report

Limeira 93, Brasília 76
Scoring by quarter: 17–14, 29–23, 23–22, 24–17
Pts: Hayes 16; Rebs: Hayes 6 Asts: Nezinho, Jackson 6	Pts: Giovannoni 22; Rebs: LaMonte 6 Asts: Fúlvio 7

Ginásio Vô Lucato, Limeira, São Paulo
Attendance: 739
Referees: Guilherme Locatelli, Jonas Pereira, Diego Chiconato

Game 2

April 24, 2015
20:00 UTC−03:00

Report

Limeira 85, Brasília 93
Scoring by quarter: 18–28, 16–25, 23–16, 28–24
Pts: Jackson 23; Rebs: Hayes 6 Asts: Nezinho 4	Pts: Giovannoni 29; Rebs: Giovannoni 11; Asts: three players 4

Ginásio Vô Lucato, Limeira, São Paulo
Attendance: 956
Referees: Cristiano Maranho, Jacob Barreto, Maria Cláudia Moraes

Game 3

April 27, 2015
20:30 UTC−03:00

Report

Brasília 83, Limeira 98
Scoring by quarter: 13–22, 25–19, 21–23, 24–34
Pts: Arthur 17; Rebs: Ronald 8 Asts: Fúlvio 5	Pts: Nezinho 21; Rebs: Fiorotto 8 Asts: Jackson 5

Ginásio da ASCEB, Brasília, Federal District
Attendance: 1,032
Referees: Fernando Serpa, Fabiano Huber, Leandro Sehnem

Game 4

April 29, 2015
19:30 UTC−03:00

Report

Brasília 76, Limeira 89
Scoring by quarter: 15–19, 26–20, 19–27, 16–23
Pts: Giovannoni 15; Rebs: Giovannoni 7 Asts: Fúlvio 5	Pts: Hayes 19; Rebs: Fiorotto 10; Asts: Nezinho 4
Limeira wins series, 3–1

Ginásio da ASCEB, Brasília, Federal District
Attendance: 1,002
Referees: José Pelissari, Marcos Benito, Andreia Silva

==== (3) Flamengo vs. (11) São José ====
Game 1

April 23, 2015
18:00 UTC−03:00

Report

Flamengo 85, São José 62
Scoring by quarter: 28–15, 19–18, 20–18, 18–11
Pts: Benite 19; Rebs: Olivinha 13; Asts: Laprovíttola 4	Pts: Baxter 15; Rebs: Torres 8 Asts: Valtinho 4

Ginásio Álvaro Vieira Lima, Rio de Janeiro, Rio de Janeiro
Attendance: 934
Referees: Cristiano Maranho, Fabiano Huber, Maria Cláudia Moraes

Game 2

April 25, 2015
18:00 UTC−03:00

Report

Flamengo 76, São José 82
Scoring by quarter: 21–20, 14–21, 22–16, 19–25
Pts: Marquinhos 22; Rebs: Olivinha 6 Asts: Laprovíttola 5	Pts: Laws 17; Rebs: three players 7 Asts: Betinho 6

Ginásio Álvaro Vieira Lima, Rio de Janeiro, Rio de Janeiro
Attendance: 1,617
Referees: Guilherme Locatelli, Marcos Ferreira, Leandro Sehnem

Game 3

April 28, 2015
20:00 UTC−03:00

Report

São José 68, Flamengo 86
Scoring by quarter: 18–25, 11–22, 22–20, 17–19
Pts: Dedé 14; Rebs: Torres 10; Asts: Torres, Valtinho 4	Pts: Olivinha 21; Rebs: Marquinhos 7 Asts: Laprovíttola 6

Ginásio Lineu de Moura, São José dos Campos, São Paulo
Attendance: 1,570
Referees: José Pelissari, Marcos Benito, Diego Chiconato

Game 4

April 30, 2015
19:30 UTC−03:00

Report

São José 81, Flamengo 76
Scoring by quarter: 28–23, 17–17, 22–19, 14–17
Pts: Baxter 21; Rebs: Torres 11; Asts: Valtinho 8	Pts: Marquinhos 26; Rebs: Laprovíttola 6 Asts: Laprovíttola 6

Ginásio Lineu de Moura, São José dos Campos, São Paulo
Attendance: 1,520
Referees: Fernando Serpa, Jacob Barreto, Andreia Silva

Game 5

May 5, 2015
21:00 UTC−03:00

Report

Flamengo 98, São José 64
Scoring by quarter: 21–18, 22–17, 29–10, 26–19
Pts: Marquinhos 26; Rebs: Meyinsse 10; Asts: Laprovíttola 9	Pts: Torres 16; Rebs: Torres, Renan 6 Asts: Valtinho 5
Flamengo wins series, 3–2

Ginásio Álvaro Vieira Lima, Rio de Janeiro, Rio de Janeiro
Attendance: 1,877
Referees: Fernando Serpa, Guilherme Locatelli, Diego Chiconato

=== Semifinals ===
==== (1) Bauru vs. (4) Mogi das Cruzes ====
Game 1

May 10, 2015
19:30 UTC−03:00

Report

Bauru 73, Mogi das Cruzes 81
Scoring by quarter: 17–21, 21–22, 21–11, 14–27
Pts: Garcia 19; Rebs: Taylor 8 Asts: Garcia 5	Pts: Shamell 27; Rebs: Curnell 5 Asts: Elinho 6

Ginásio Panela de Pressão, Bauru, São Paulo
Attendance: 1,680
Referees: Cristiano Maranho, Jacob Barreto, Maria Cláudia Moraes

Game 2

May 12, 2015
21:00 UTC−03:00

Report

Bauru 84, Mogi das Cruzes 81
Scoring by quarter: 19–13, 22–17, 23–22, 20–29
Pts: Garcia 22; Rebs: Garcia 6 Asts: Fischer 12	Pts: Shamell, Jimmy 13; Rebs: Alexandre 7 Asts: Shamell 3

Ginásio Panela de Pressão, Bauru, São Paulo
Attendance: 1,556
Referees: Guilherme Locatelli, Jonas Pereira, Fabiano Huber

Game 3

May 15, 2015
19:30 UTC−03:00

Report

Mogi das Cruzes 85, Bauru 78
Scoring by quarter: 15–19, 22–15, 27–25, 21–19
Pts: Shamell 23; Rebs: Curnell 9 Asts: Gustavinho, Elinho 3	Pts: Fischer, Day 18; Rebs: Murilo, Hettsheimeir 7 Asts: Garcia 7

Ginásio Professor Hugo Ramos, Mogi das Cruzes, São Paulo
Attendance: 4,085
Referees: Fernando Serpa, Marcos Ferreira, Diego Chiconato

Game 4

May 17, 2015
13:00 UTC−03:00

Report

Mogi das Cruzes 91, Bauru 98 (2OT)
Scoring by quarter: 12–11, 15–20, 23–26, 19–12, Overtime: 12–12, 10–17
Pts: Filipin 22; Rebs: Curnell 15; Asts: Gustavinho 5	Pts: Hettsheimeir 22; Rebs: Taylor 8 Asts: Fischer 9

Ginásio Professor Hugo Ramos, Mogi das Cruzes, São Paulo
Attendance: 4,308
Referees: Guilherme Locatelli, Jacob Barreto, Fabiano Huber

Game 5

May 20, 2015
19:30 UTC−03:00

Report

Bauru 77, Mogi das Cruzes 65
Scoring by quarter: 15–17, 19–11, 16–15, 27–22
Pts: Fischer 20; Rebs: Murilo 12; Asts: Taylor, Garcia 7	Pts: Prestes 14; Rebs: Gerson, Shamell 6 Asts: Curnell 6
Bauru wins series, 3–2

Ginásio Panela de Pressão, Bauru, São Paulo
Attendance: 2,535
Referees: Cristiano Maranho, Jacob Barreto, Diego Chiconato

==== (2) Limeira vs. (3) Flamengo ====
Game 1

May 9, 2015
16:00 UTC−03:00

Report

Limeira 78, Flamengo 85
Scoring by quarter: 20–14, 21–24, 18–18, 19–29
Pts: Jackson 19; Rebs: Jackson, Fiorotto 5 Asts: Nezinho 7	Pts: Laprovíttola 21; Rebs: Olivinha, Marquinhos 6 Asts: Laprovíttola 6

Ginásio Vô Lucato, Limeira, São Paulo
Attendance: 1,431
Referees: Guilherme Locatelli, Diego Chiconato, Fabiano Huber

Game 2

May 11, 2015
19:00 UTC−03:00

Report

Limeira 73, Flamengo 92
Scoring by quarter: 15–27, 21–16, 13–17, 24–32
Pts: Teichmann, Deryk 13; Rebs: Teichmann 6 Asts: Mineiro 5	Pts: Marquinhos 25; Rebs: Marquinhos 5 Asts: Laprovíttola 6

Ginásio Vô Lucato, Limeira, São Paulo
Attendance: 1,168
Referees: Fernando Serpa, Marcos Ferreira, Leandro Sehnem

Game 3

May 14, 2015
20:30 UTC−03:00

Report

Flamengo 76, Limeira 67
Scoring by quarter: 21–21, 14–19, 19–20, 22–7
Pts: Meyinsse 17; Rebs: Olivinha 8 Asts: Laprovíttola 7	Pts: Jackson 15; Rebs: Mineiro 8 Asts: Ramón 4
Flamengo wins series, 3–0

Ginásio Álvaro Vieira Lima, Rio de Janeiro, Rio de Janeiro
Attendance: 1,971
Referees: Cristiano Maranho, Jacob Barreto, Maurício Serour

=== Finals: (1) Bauru vs. (3) Flamengo ===
Game 1

May 26, 2015
21:30 UTC−03:00

Report

Flamengo 91, Bauru 69
Scoring by quarter: 28–18, 19–10, 23–15, 21–26
Pts: Benite 16; Rebs: Felício 8 Asts: Laprovíttola 7	Pts: Fischer 20; Rebs: Garcia, Murilo 5 Asts: Fischer 8

HSBC Arena, Rio de Janeiro, Rio de Janeiro
Attendance: 5,616
Referees: Fernando Serpa, Guilherme Locatelli, Diego Chiconato

Game 2

May 30, 2015
10:00 UTC−03:00

Report

Bauru 67, Flamengo 77
Scoring by quarter: 11–25, 14–15, 14–22, 28–15
Pts: Day 23; Rebs: Garcia 8 Asts: Taylor 6	Pts: Laprovíttola 19; Rebs: Olivinha, Meyinsse 8 Asts: Laprovíttola 4
Flamengo wins series, 2–0

Ginásio Municipal Neusa Galetti, Marília, São Paulo
Referees: Cristiano Maranho, Jacob Barreto, Fabiano Huber

== Statistical leaders ==
=== Individual tournament highs ===
Points

Pos.	Name	G	PPG
1	(United States) Shamell Stallworth (MOG)	39	20.00
2	(Brazil) Guilherme Giovannoni (BRA)	36	18.14
3	(United States) Jamaal Smith (MAC)	38	17.76
4	(United States) Kyle LaMonte (BRA)	23	16.96
5	(United States) David Jackson (LIM)	34	16.62

Rebounds

Pos.	Name	G	RPG
1	(Brazil) Caio Torres (SJO)	32	9.06
2	(Brazil) Shilton dos Santos (MIN)	32	8.44
3	(Brazil) Felipe Ribeiro (PIN)	27	6.89
4	(United States) Steven Toyloy (PAL)	34	6.85
5	(Brazil) Marcus Vinicius Toledo (PIN)	33	6.48

Assists

Pos.	Name	G	APG
1	(Argentina) Maxi Stanic (PAL)	33	6.24
2	(Brazil) Ricardo Fischer (BAU)	42	6.14
3	(Argentina) Nicolás Laprovíttola (FLA)	39	5.67
4	(Brazil) Fúlvio de Assis (BRA)	33	5.64
5	(United States) Joe Smith (PIN)	33	5.30

Blocks

Pos.	Name	G	BPG
1	(United States) Jerome Meyinsse (FLA)	39	1.21
2	(United States) Vernon Goodridge (BRA)	12	1.17
3	(United States) O'Neal Mims (UBE)	25	1.16
4	(Brazil) Ronald Reis (BRA)	38	1.05
5	(Brazil) Léo Waszkiewicz (FRA)	30	0.80

Steals

Pos.	Name	G	SPG
1	(United States) Worrel Clahar (LSB)	23	2.61
2	(Brazil) Eric Tatu (RCB)	30	2.20
3	(Brazil) Duda Machado (RCB)	20	2.15
4	(Brazil) Marcus Vinicius Toledo (PIN)	33	2.06
5	(United States) Caleb Brown (UBE)	8	1.75

Efficiency

Pos.	Name	G	Eff
1	(Brazil) Guilherme Giovannoni (BRA)	36	19.06
2	(United States) David Jackson (LIM)	34	18.21
3	(Brazil) Caio Torres (SJO)	32	18.16
4	(Brazil) Alex Garcia (BAU)	40	17.95
5	(United States) Jamaal Smith (MAC)	38	17.55

Source: LNB – NBB

|}
