= 2014 NBB All-Star Game =

The 2014 NBB All-Star Game is an exhibition basketball game that will be played on February 22, 2014 at Ginásio Paulo Sarasate in Fortaleza, Ceará, home of Basquete Cearense. This game will be the 6th edition of the NBB All-Star Game and will be played during the 2013–14 NBB season. Basquete Cearense was awarded the All-Star Game in an announcement by president Cássio Roque on January 16, 2014. This will be the first time that Fortaleza is hosting the All-Star game.

The teams were formed by Brazilian players, called "NBB Brasil" (NBB Brazil), and by foreign players, called "NBB Mundo" (NBB World). The twelve players of each team were selected by the trade press, the teams' captains and coaches. Starters for the game were selected by the fans, who could select one guard, two forwards and two centers for each team.

== All-Star Game ==
=== Coaches ===
José Alves Neto, coach of the Flamengo, and Gustavo de Conti, coach of the Paulistano, were selected as the NBB Brasil and NBB Mundo head coach, respectively. Sérgio Hernández, from Brasília, and Léo Costa, from Macaé Basquete, were selected as the NBB Brasil assistant coaches; while Demétrius Ferraciú, from Limeira, and Alberto Bial, from Basquete Cearense, were selected as the NBB Mundo assistant coaches.

=== Roster ===
NBB Brasil
Pos	Player	Team	No. of selections	Votes (%)
Starters
G	Nezinho	Brasília	4	37,3
G	Alex Garcia	Brasília	6	37
F	Marcelinho Machado	Flamengo	5	28,1
F	Guilherme Giovannoni	Brasília	5	22,5
C	Murilo Becker	Bauru	5	26,6
Reserves
G	Valtinho	Uberlândia	5	31,4
G	Ricardo Fischer	Bauru	1	31,3
F	Jefferson William	São José	3	20,5
F	Léo Meindl	Franca	1	14,4
F	Olivinha	Flamengo	6	19,4
C	Lucas Cipolini	Uberlândia	2	16,7
C	Paulão Prestes	Franca	1	14,8
Head coach: José Alves Neto (Flamengo)

NBB Mundo
Pos	Player	Team	No. of selections	Votes (%)
Starters
G	(Argentina) Nicolás Laprovíttola	Flamengo	1	57,8
G	(United States) Shamell Stallworth	Pinheiros	6	41,1
F	(United States) Robert Day	Uberlândia	4	25,2
C	(United States) Jerome Meyinsse	Flamengo	1	25,4
C	(United States) DeVon Hardin	Basquete Cearense	1	22,8
Reserves
G	(United States) Joe Smith	Pinheiros	2	22,7
G	(United States) Kenny Dawkins	Paulistano	2	19,5
G	(United States) David Jackson	Limeira	2	15,1
F	(United States) Desmond Holloway	Paulistano	2	18,6
F	(Argentina) Pablo Espinoza	Macaé Basquete	1	15,8
C	(United States) Marcus Goree	Brasília	1	18,8
C	(United States) Tyrone Curnell	Palmeiras	2	17,2
Head coach: Gustavo de Conti (Paulistano)

=== Game ===
Globo
SporTV

February 22, 2014
10:00 (UTC−03:00)

Report

NBB Brasil 126, NBB Mundo 116
Scoring by quarter: 36-30, 31-30, 33-31, 26-25
Pts: Alex 33; Rebs: Olivinha 11; Asts: Nezinho, Valtinho 7	Pts: Shamell 23; Rebs: Meyinsse, Laprovíttola 6 Asts: Shamell, Laprovíttola 5

Ginásio Paulo Sarasate, Fortaleza, Ceará
Referees: José Pelissari, Sérgio Pacheco, Marcos Benito

== All-Star Weekend ==
=== Shooting Stars Competition ===
In the 6th edition of NBB All-Star Game, Liga Nacional de Basquete for the first time the Shooting Stars Competition of Brazilian basketball. Four teams were formed, each of them containing one NBB's player, one retired male player and one female player. For the edition, LNB selected the players who were World champions.

The mechanics of dispute Shooting Stars Competition. Each group of three players will have to transform seven shots from different positions of the court, the last of them being half-court. The maximum time for each triplet will close the circuit for two minutes. The two fastest times will qualify the decision of the tournament to be known after the big winner.

Team Name	Members	Team	First round	Final round
Team Jericoacara	Jimmy Dreher	Basquete Cearense	1:48	–
Team Jericoacara	Rogério Klafke	(retired)	1:48	–
Team Jericoacara	Alessandra Oliveira	(retired)	1:48	–
Team Iracema	Cauê Borges	Franca	0.37	1.05
Team Iracema	Chuí	(retired)	0.37	1.05
Team Iracema	Roseli	(retired)	0.37	1.05
Team Canoa Quebrada	Guilherme Giovannoni	Brasília	1:25	1.13
Team Canoa Quebrada	Marcel	(retired)	1:25	1.13
Team Canoa Quebrada	Helen	(retired)	1:25	1.13
Team Cumbuco	Arnaldinho	Espírito Santo	1.35	-
Team Cumbuco	Pipoka	(retired)	1.35	-
Team Cumbuco	Janeth	(retired)	1.35	-

=== Skills Challenge ===
The Skills Challenge, which will be played for the fourth time, will have the presence of three times champion Fernando Penna, from Universo/Goiânia, the guard Brandon Brown, from the host team Basquete Cearense, and six more competitors which was determined by the LNB Technical Department.

Player	First round	Finals
Nezinho (Brasília)	24	23
Brandon Brown (Basquete Cearense)	22	36
Elinho (Minas)	28	
Jamaal Smith (Macaé)	29	
Neto (Palmeiras)	29	
Gustavinho (Mogi das Cruzes)	30	
Kenny Dawkins (Paulistano)	33	
Fernando Penna (Goiânia)	36	
Nicolás Laprovíttola (Flamengo)	39	

=== Three-Point Tournament ===
The tournament will have six competitors for the title. The champion of previous season Matheus Dalla, from Limeira, and Matheus Costa, from the host city team, had already been secured in the dispute and its five rivals, with four of this five players being the four greatest three-point shooters.

Player	First round	Finals
Marcelinho (Flamengo)	20	23
Jefferson (São José)	16	10
Shamell (Pinheiros)	15	
Matheus (Basquete Cearense)	14	
Robert Day (Uberlândia)	13	
Matheus Dalla (Limeira)	12	
Fernando Fischer (Bauru)	11	

=== Dunk Tournament ===
For Dunk Tournament, the champion in the previous two seasons was the shooting guard Gui Deodato, from Bauru, while the host team, Basquete Cearense, will be represented by the center DeVon Hardin. The other challengers to the title was defined after being evaluated by a jury of personalities from basketball.

Player	First round	Finals
DeVon Hardin (Basquete Cearense)	48+50=98	50
Ned Cox (Liga Sorocabana)	48+50=98	43
Jhonatan (Franca)	44+49=93	
Gui Deodato (Bauru)	46+46=92	
