= 2016–17 NBB season =

Novo Basquete Brasil
- Season: 2016–17
- Dates: 5 November 2016 – 18 June 2017
- Teams: 15
- TV partner: SporTV Globo Band Facebook Live

Regular season
- Season MVP: Desmond Holloway
- Relegated: Liga Sorocabana; Banrisul Caxias do Sul

Finals
- Champions: Bauru (2nd title)
- Runners-up: Paulistano Corpore
- Finals MVP: Alex Garcia

The 2016–17 NBB season was the 9th season of the Novo Basquete Brasil, the Brazilian basketball league. Once again this tournament was organized entirely by the Liga Nacional de Basquete (LNB). The NBB also qualified teams for international tournaments such as Liga Sudamericana and FIBA Americas League.

This season fifteen teams played each other in the regular season. At the end of the home and away matches round the top four teams qualified for the quarterfinals of the playoffs automatically, while the teams finishing in the 5th and 12th place participated in the first round of the playoffs to determine the other four teams in the quarterfinals, in a five-match series. This season maintained 15/16's playoff method of best of 5 games, played on the 1-2-1-1 format.

For this season, the last two regular season placed teams were relegated to the Liga Ouro, the NBB second division. Only the Liga Ouro winner received the right to contest NBB in the next year.

== Participating teams ==
New teams in the league

- Vasco da Gama (2016 Liga Ouro champions, promoted)
- Campo Mourão Basquete (2016 Liga Ouro runners-up, invited)

Teams that left the league

- São José
- Rio Claro Basquete

Team	Home city	Stadium	Capacity	Head coach	Appearance	Last regular season	Last season playoffs
Solar Basquete Cearense	Fortaleza	Ginásio Paulo Sarasate	8,200	(Brazil) Alberto Bial	5th	4th	Quarterfinals
Gocil/Bauru Basket	Bauru	Ginásio Panela de Pressão	2,000	(Brazil) Demétrius Ferracciú	9th	2nd	Runner-up
Campo Mourão Basquete	Campo Mourão	Ginásio de Esportes Belin Carolo	3,000	(Brazil) Emerson de Souza	1st	2nd (Liga Ouro)	-
UniCEUB/BRB Brasília	Brasília	Ginásio da ASCEB	3,050	(Brazil) Bruno Savignani	9th	6th	Semifinals
Banrisul Caxias do Sul	Caxias do Sul	Ginásio Vasco da Gama	850	(Brazil) Rodrigo Barbosa	2nd	11th	Round of 16
Flamengo	Rio de Janeiro	Ginásio Hélio Maurício; Ginásio Álvaro Vieira Lima	800; 4,500	(Brazil) José Alves Neto	9th	1st	Champions
Franca	Franca	Ginásio Pedrocão	6,000	(Brazil) Helinho	9th	8th	Round of 16
Liga Sorocabana	Sorocaba	Ginásio Gualberto Moreira	3,000	(Brazil) Rinaldo Rodrigues	6th	13th	DNQ
Macaé	Macaé	Ginásio Juquinha	3,000	(Brazil) Léo Costa	4th	15th	DNQ
Minas Storm	Belo Horizonte	Arena Vivo	4,000	(Brazil) Cristiano Grama	9th	10th	Round of 16
Mogi das Cruzes/Helbor	Mogi das Cruzes	Ginásio Municipal Professor Hugo Ramos	5,000	(Brazil) Guerrinha	5th	5th	Semifinals
Paulistano/Corpore	São Paulo	Ginásio Antônio Prado Junior	1,500	(Brazil) Gustavo de Conti	9th	3rd	Quarterfinals
Pinheiros	São Paulo	Poliesportivo Henrique Villaboim	854	(Brazil) César Guidetti	9th	7th	Quarterfinals
Vasco da Gama	Rio de Janeiro	Ginásio Vasco da Gama	1.000	(Brazil) Dedé Barbosa	1st	1st (Liga Ouro)	-
Universo Vitória	Salvador	Ginásio Poliesportivo de Cajazeiras Fazenda	2.060	(Brazil) Régis Marrelli	2nd	12th	Round of 16

== Transactions ==
=== Retirement ===
- On September 24, 2016, Robert Day retired from basketball after playing 6 seasons in Brazil, reaching the league final on three occasions with São José (12/13) and Bauru Basket (14/15, 15/16), as well as winning NBB's best Small Forward award for the 12/13 season.

=== Coaching changes ===
Coaching changes
Off-season
Team	2015–16 season	2016–17 season
Franca	Lula Ferreira	Helinho
Mogi das Cruzes/Helbor	Danilo Padovani	Guerrinha

==== Off-season ====
- On May 13, 2016, Franca hired Helinho to replace Lula Ferreira, who became the team General Manager after four years working as the team coach.
- On June 10, 2016, Mogi decided not to renew with coach Danilo Padovani, hiring Guerrinha as his replacement.

==== In-season ====
There were no coaching changes during the regular season.

== Regular season ==
The regular season began on Saturday, November 5, 2016 at Ginásio Panela de Pressão, home of Gocil/Bauru Basket, who hosted a game against the Flamengo at 14:00 UTC−03:00. The regular season ended on Saturday, April 8, 2017.

=== Standings ===
Pos	Team	Pld	W	L	PF	PA	PD	PCT	GB	Qualification or relegation
1	Flamengo	28	21	7	2464	2195	+269	.750	—	Qualification to the playoff quarter-finals
2	Mogi das Cruzes/Helbor	28	20	8	2274	2088	+186	.714	1	Qualification to the playoff quarter-finals
3	Franca	28	19	9	2256	2199	+57	.679	2	Qualification to the playoff quarter-finals
4	UniCEUB/BRB Brasília	28	19	9	2285	2155	+130	.679	2	Qualification to the playoff quarter-finals
5	Gocil/Bauru Basket	28	18	10	2256	2086	+170	.643	3	Qualification to the playoff first round
6	Paulistano/Corpore	28	16	12	2287	2146	+141	.571 (Note: Paulistano 83–66 Universo/Vitoria)	5	Qualification to the playoff first round
7	Universo Vitória	28	16	12	2130	2105	+25	.571	5	Qualification to the playoff first round
8	Pinheiros	28	16	12	2275	2250	+25	.571	5	Qualification to the playoff first round
9	Vasco da Gama	28	14	14	2099	2182	−83	.500	7	Qualification to the playoff first round
10	Campo Mourão Basquete	28	13	15	2140	2226	−86	.464	8	Qualification to the playoff first round
11	Solar Basquete Cearense	28	12	16	2116	2184	−68	.429	9	Qualification to the playoff first round
12	Macaé	28	8	20	2117	2212	−95	.286	13	Qualification to the playoff first round
13	Minas Storm	28	7	21	2146	2332	−186	.250	14	
14	Liga Sorocabana (R)	28	6	22	1921	2159	−238	.214	15	Relegated to Liga Ouro
15	Banrisul Caxias do Sul (R)	28	5	23	2022	2269	−247	.179	16	Relegated to Liga Ouro

Rules for classification: A. Win–loss record, B. Point differential; C. Head-to-head matchup; D. Percentage, E. Games behind, F. Quotient system (If necessary)
(R) Relegated

== Awards ==
Most Valuable Player: Desmond Holloway, Pinheiros
Sixth Man of the Year Award: Arthur Pecos, Paulistano/Corpore
Defensive Player of the Year Award: Jimmy de Oliveira, Mogi das Cruzes/Helbor
Most Improved Player of the Year Award: Georginho de Paula, Paulistano/Corpore
NBB Coach of the Year (Ary Vidal Trophy): Gustavo de Conti, Paulistano/Corpore
NBB's Revelation Player of the Year: Alexey Borges, Franca
NBB Finals MVP Award: Alex Garcia, Bauru Basket

== Arenas ==
As both teams played their first NBB season, it was the first appearance of Campo Mourão's Ginásio de Esportes Belin Carolo and Vasco's Ginásio Vasco da Gama.

== Identities ==
- On June 20, 2016, Mogi das Cruzes/Helbor unveiled a new team logo.
- On July 21, 2016, Liga Sorocabana unveiled a new team identity.
- On August 29, 2016, UniCEUB/BRB Brasília unveiled a new rebrand of their logo and mascot.
- On September 2, 2016, Bauru Basket unveiled a new sponsor partnership involving naming rights with Gocil, and so its name changed to Gocil/Bauru Basket. On September 20, 2016 they announced a new team identity and new team colors (green, orange, black and white).
- On September 21, 2016, Banrisul Caxias do Sul unveiled a new team identity.
- On October 7, 2016, Campo Mourão Basquete unveiled a new team identity for their first NBB season.
- On October 28, 2016, Minas Tênis clube unveiled a new team identity and nickname for the season, and so its name changed to Minas Storm.

== Notable occurrences ==
=== Playoffs ===
- This was the first time that no team from the top 4 advanced to the semi-finals.

== Playoffs ==
Play-offs
(5) Bauru Basket	3
(12) Macaé	0
(8) Pinheiros	3
(9) Vasco da Gama	2
(6) Paulistano/Corpore	3
(11) Solar Basquete Cearense	2
(7) Universo Vitória	3
(10) Mourão	2

Quarter-finals
(4) Brasília	1
(5) Bauru Basket	3
(1) Flamengo	2
(8) Pinheiros	3
(3) Franca	2
(6) Paulistano/Corpore	3
(2) Mogi das Cruzes/Helbor	2
(7) Universo Vitória	3

Semi-finals
Bauru Basket	3
Pinheiros	2
Paulistano/Corpore	3
Universo Vitória	0

NBB Finals
Bauru Basket	3
Paulistano/Corpore	2

== Final standings ==
Teams are ranked based on the playoff round in which they were eliminated and their regular season records.

Pos	Team	Pld	W	L	
1	Bauru (C, O)	42	27	15	Qualification to 2018 FIBA Americas League
2	Paulistano/Corpore	43	24	19	Qualification to 2018 FIBA Americas League
3	Universo Vitória	33	23	10	Qualification to 2018 FIBA Americas League
4	Pinheiros	46	27	19	Qualification to 2017 Liga Sudamericana de Básquetbol
5	Flamengo	35	25	10	Qualification to 2017 Liga Sudamericana de Básquetbol
6	Mogi das Cruzes/Helbor (Note: Mogi das Cruzes/Helbor was invited to the 2018 FIBA Americas League with a wild card, after two Venezuelan teams could not participate due to financial trouble.)	33	22	11	Qualification to 2018 FIBA Americas League
7	Franca	33	21	12	Qualification to 2017 Liga Sudamericana de Básquetbol
8	Brasília	42	20	22	

Source: LNB.com.br
(C) Champions; (O) Play-off winners
