= 2015–16 NBB season =

NBB 2015–16
- League: Novo Basquete Brasil
- Sport: Basketball
- Duration: October 2015–June 2016
- Teams: 15
- TV partner: SporTV Rede Globo RedeTV! (Finals)

NBB season
- Champions: Flamengo

NBB seasons
- ← 2014–15 2016–17 →

The 2015–16 NBB season was the 8th season of the Novo Basquete Brasil, the Brazilian basketball league. Once again this tournament was organized entirely by the Liga Nacional de Basquete (LNB). The NBB also qualified teams for international tournaments such as Liga Sudamericana and FIBA Americas League.

This season fifteen teams were played each other in the regular season. At the end of the home and away matches round the top four teams qualified for the quarterfinals of the playoffs automatically, while the teams finishing in the 5th and 12th place participated in the first round of the playoffs to determine the other four teams in the quarterfinals, in a five-match series. This year NBB returned to a series in the Finals, played in a best of three-match.

For this season, only the last regular season placed was relegated to the Liga Ouro, the NBB second division. The Liga Ouro winner receive the right to contest NBB in the next year.

== Participating teams ==
New teams in the league

- Caxias do Sul Basquete (2015 Liga Ouro champions, promoted)
- Vitória (2015 Liga Ouro runners-up, promoted)

Teams that left the league

- Uberlândia
- Palmeiras
- Limeira

Team	Home city	Stadium	Capacity	Head coach	Appearance	Last season
Basquete Cearense	Fortaleza	Ginásio da UNIFOR; Ginásio Paulo Sarasate	2,200; 8,200	(Brazil) Alberto Bial	4th	14th
Bauru	Bauru	Ginásio Panela de Pressão	2,000	(Brazil) Demétrius Ferracciú	8th	2nd
Brasília	Brasília	Ginásio da ASCEB; Ginásio Nilson Nelson	3,050; 16,000	(Brazil) Bruno Savignani	8th	6th
Caxias do Sul	Caxias do Sul	Ginásio Vasco da Gama	850	(Brazil) Rodrigo Barbosa	1st	1st (Liga Ouro)
Flamengo	Rio de Janeiro	Ginásio Álvaro Vieira Lima; Arena Carioca 2	4,500; 10,000	(Brazil) José Alves Neto	8th	1st
Franca	Franca	Ginásio Pedrocão	6,000	(Brazil) Lula Ferreira	8th	12th
Liga Sorocabana	Sorocaba	Ginásio Gualberto Moreira	3,000	(Brazil) Rinaldo Rodrigues	5th	16th
Macaé Basquete	Macaé	Tênis Clube de Macaé; Ginásio Maurício Soares Bittencourt	3,000; 6,000	(Brazil) Léo Costa	3rd	8th
Minas Tênis Clube	Belo Horizonte	Arena Vivo	4,000	(Brazil) Cristiano Grama	8th	9th
Mogi das Cruzes	Mogi das Cruzes	Ginásio Municipal Professor Hugo Ramos	5,000	(Brazil) Danilo Padovani	4th	4th
Paulistano	São Paulo	Ginásio Antônio Prado Junior	1,500	(Brazil) Gustavo de Conti	8th	10th
Pinheiros	São Paulo	Poliesportivo Henrique Villaboim	854	(Brazil) César Guidetti	8th	11th
Rio Claro Basquete	Rio Claro	Ginásio de Esportes Felipe Karam	3,000	(Brazil) Dedé Barbosa	2nd	15th
São José	São José dos Campos	Ginásio Lineu de Moura	2,620	(Brazil) Cristiano Ahmed	8th	7th
Vitória	Salvador	Ginásio Poliesportivo de Cajazeiras Fazenda	ND	(Brazil) Régis Marrelli	1st	2nd (Liga Ouro)

Locations of the 2015–16 NBB teams

== Head coach changes ==
Pre-season changes

Team	Outgoing coach	Manner of departure	Replaced by	Date of appointment

Mid-season changes

Team	Outgoing coach	Manner of departure	Replaced by	Date of appointment

== Playoffs ==
First Round (Best-of-5)
(8) Rio Claro	3
(9) Franca	2
(5) Mogi das Cruzes	3
(12) Vitória	0
(7) Pinheiros	3
(10) Minas	2
(6) Brasília	3
(11) Caxias do Sul	1

Quarterfinals (Best-of-5)
(1) Flamengo	3
(8) Rio Claro	0
(4) Basquete Cearense	1
(5) Mogi das Cruzes	3
(2) Bauru	3
(7) Pinheiros	1
(3) Paulistano	1
(6) Brasília	3

Semifinals (Best-of-5)
(1) Flamengo	3
(5) Mogi das Cruzes	2
(2) Bauru	3
(6) Brasília	0

Final (Best-of-5)
(1) Flamengo	3
(2) Bauru	2
