= Ricardo Fischer =

Brazilian basketball player (born 1991)

No. 5 – Flamengo
- Position: Point guard
- League: NBB

Personal information
- Born: May 16, 1991 (age 35) São Paulo, Brazil
- Listed height: 183 cm (6 ft 0 in)
- Listed weight: 83 kg (183 lb)

Career information
- NBA draft: 2013: undrafted
- Playing career: 2008–present

Career history
- 2008: Hebraica
- 2008–2010: Sion Hérens
- 2010–2012: São José
- 2012–2016: Bauru
- 2016–2017: Flamengo
- 2017–2018: Bilbao Basket
- 2018–2021: Corinthians
- 2021–2022: Brasília
- 2023–present: Flamengo

Career highlights
- FIBA Americas League champion (2015); FIBA South American League champion (2014); All-NBB Team (2015); NBB Revelation Player (2013)
Medals
Men's basketball
Representing Brazil
Pan American Games
Gold medal – first place	2015 Toronto

Ricardo Fischer (born May 16, 1991) is a Brazilian professional basketball player who currently plays for Flamengo in the Novo Basquete Brasil (NBB). Fischer has also represented the senior Brazilian national basketball team.

== Professional career ==
In his pro career, Fischer has played in both the 2nd-tier South American League, and the 1st-tier FIBA Americas League. He has also played in the European-wide 2nd-tier level EuroCup.

=== Flamengo ===
On 7 July 2016, Flamengo announced Fischer as their major signing for the 2016–17 NBB season in Brazil.

=== Bilbao Basket ===
On 5 July 2017, Fischer signed a two-year deal with the Spanish club Bilbao Basket. On March 1, 2018, Fischer part ways with Bilbao Basket.

== National team career ==
Fischer played with the senior men's Brazilian national basketball team at the 2015 Pan American Games, where he won a gold medal, and at the 2015 FIBA Americas Championship, in Mexico City.

== NBB career statistics ==
=== NBB regular season ===
Season	Team	GP	MPG	2PT FG%	3PT FG%	FT%	RPG	APG	SPG	BPG	PPG
2010–11	São José	11	10.6	.592	.364	.938	1.4	.7	.2	.0	5.2
2011–12	São José	27	13.8	.696	.393	.886	1.1	1.9	.5	.0	6.2
2012–13	Bauru	34	29.1	.523	.436	.797	2.6	4.5	1.2	.1	12.1
2013–14	Bauru	29	31.4	.579	.439	.856	2.6	5.1	1.4	.0	13.9
2014–15	Bauru	30	29.0	.541	.427	.838	3.9	6.4	1.2	.0	10.8
2015–16	Bauru	23	28.8	.548	.431	.863	4.1	5.3	.9	.0	11.3
Career		154	23.8	.558	.426	.848	2.6	4.0	.9	.0	10.6

=== NBB playoffs ===
Season	Team	GP	MPG	2PT FG%	3PT FG%	FT%	RPG	APG	SPG	BPG	PPG
2012	São José	9	8.3	.444	.571	.875	.9	.9	.3	.0	3.9
2013	Bauru	4	31.2	.417	.29.4	.800	4.5	3.5	.8	.0	8.3
2014	Bauru	7	32.3	.411	.419	.952	4.3	5.9	1.1	.0	15.0
2015	Bauru	12	34.2	.491	.442	.886	3.5	6.2	1.0	.0	12.7
Career		32	26.5	.448	.418	.892	3.3	4.1	.8	.0	10.2
