= Jerome Meyinsse =

American basketball player (born 1988)

Free agent
- Position: Center

Personal information
- Born: December 18, 1988 (age 37) Baton Rouge, Louisiana, U.S.
- Listed height: 6 ft 10 in (2.08 m)
- Listed weight: 233 lb (106 kg)

Career information
- High school: McKinley (Baton Rouge, Louisiana)
- College: Virginia (2006–2010)
- NBA draft: 2010: undrafted
- Playing career: 2010–present

Career history
- 2010–2011: 9 de Julio
- 2011–2012: Estudiantes (BB)
- 2012: Centro Juventud Sionista
- 2012–2013: Regatas Corrientes
- 2013: Trotamundos Carabobo
- 2013–2016: Flamengo
- 2016–2017: San Lorenzo
- 2017–2018: Atenas de Cordoba
- 2018–2019: San Lorenzo
- 2019–2020: Aguacateros de Michoacán
- 2020–2021: Ironi Nes Ziona
- 2021–2022: Sendai 89ers
- 2022–2025: Ironi Ness Ziona
- 2025–2026: Quimsa
- 2026: Soles de Mexicali

Career highlights
- LNBP West District MVP (2020); FIBA Europe Cup champion (2021); FIBA Intercontinental Cup champion (2014); 3× Brazilian League champion (2014–2016); Brazilian League Finals MVP (2014); 2× Brazilian All-Star (2014, 2015)

Jerome Dieu Donne Meyinsse (born December 18, 1988) is an American professional basketball player who most recently played for Soles de Mexicali of the Liga Nacional de Baloncesto Profesional (LNBP). At a height of 2.08 m (6 ft 10 in) tall, he plays at the center position.

== Personal life ==
Because of his fluency in the Portuguese language, and his quick adaptation to the Brazilian culture, Meyinsse became a fan favorite in Rio de Janeiro, while he was playing with Flamengo. He was nicknamed, "The Big One", by Flamengo supporters, and was one of the most popular basketball players in Brazil at the time. Meyinsse has often been the subject of local news articles, due to his posts on Instagram.

== High school ==
Born and raised in Baton Rouge, Louisiana, Meyinsse attended and played basketball at McKinley Senior High School ('06). He averaged 18.5 points, 11 rebounds, five blocked shots, and three assists per game as a senior. He was the team's captain and earned Class 4A All-State Second Team honors. He was also selected to play with the East Team, in the Louisiana High School Coaches Association All-Star Game.

== College career ==
After high school, Meyinsse played college basketball at the University of Virginia, with the Virginia Cavaliers.

=== College statistics ===
Year	Team	GP	GS	MPG	FG%	3P%	FT%	RPG	APG	SPG	BPG	PPG
2006–07	Virginia	15	0	6.7	.364	.000	.692	1.3	0.1	0.1	.1	1.1
2007–08	Virginia	26	0	7.2	.697	.000	.333	1.9	0.1	0.1	.1	1.9
2008–09	Virginia	17	1	8.8	.400	.000	.591	1.6	0.1	0.1	.4	1.7
2009–10	Virginia	31	23	22.3	.580	.000	.747	4.1	0.4	0.3	.7	6.5
Career		89	24	12.7	.568	.000	.783	2.5	0.3	0.2	.4	3.4

== Professional career ==
Meyinsse began his pro career in 2010, and has played with several clubs in Argentina and Brazil. In 2011-12 playing for Estudiantes de Bahía Blanca in Argentina, he averaged 15.3 points (8th in the league), 6.4 rebounds, and 1.2 blocks (2nd) per game. In January 2013, he was cut by Sionista, and he then joined Regatas Corrientes. Meyinsse made a quick adjustment to his new team, and with them, he won Argentina's top-tier level league, the Liga Nacional de Básquet (LNB), in May 2013.

Meyinsse's next step in his career was to play with Flamengo, of Brazil's top-tier level Novo Basquete Brasil (NBB). Along with his Argentinian friend, point guard Nicolás Laprovíttola, and Brazilian shooting guard Vítor Benite, Meyinsse had success in Brazil. He won several tournaments with Flamengo.

For the 2016–17 season, Meyinsse joined San Lorenzo de Almagro, of the Liga Nacional de Basquet (LNB). With San Lorenzo, Meyinsse won the Argentine League championship for the second time, while playing under head coach Julio Lamas. For the 2017–18 season, he joined the Argentine League club Atenas de Córdoba.

On November 22, 2020, he signed with Ironi Nes Ziona of the Israeli Basketball Premier League.

On June 17, 2021, he signed with Sendai 89ers of the B.League.

In the summer of 2022, he signed with Ironi Ness Ziona of the Israeli Basketball Premier League.

== NBB career statistics ==
=== NBB regular season ===
Season	Team	GP	MPG	2PT FG%	3PT FG%	FT%	RPG	APG	SPG	BPG	PPG
2013–14	Flamengo	31	21.3	.667	.000	.734	4.7	.5	.7	1.0	12.2
2014–15	Flamengo	29	25.5	.617	.500	.674	5.5	.8	.9	1.1	11.2
2015–16	Flamengo	26	18.2	.632	.000	.783	4.3	.9	.5	1.0	9.2
Career		86	21.7	.640	.500	.718	4.8	.8	.7	1.0	11.0
All-Star		2	24	1.000	.000	1.000	6.0	3.0	.0	.0	4.0

=== NBB playoffs ===
Season	Team	GP	MPG	2PT FG%	3PT FG%	FT%	RPG	APG	SPG	BPG	PPG
2013–14	Flamengo	9	24.8	.662	.000	.698	6.3	.7	.6	.8	13.3
2014–15	Flamengo	10	24.8	.590	.000	.818	4.9	.8	.5	1.4	9.2
Career		19	24.8	.633	.000	.738	5.6	.7	.5	1.1	11.2

== Awards and accomplishments ==
- FIBA Intercontinental Cup Champion: (2014)
- 2× Brazilian League Champion: (2014, 2015)
- Brazilian All-Star: (2014)
- Brazilian League Finals MVP: (2014)
