= Rafael Mineiro =

Brazilian basketball player

Rafa Mineiro
No. 12 – Flamengo
- Position: Power forward / center
- League: NBB

Personal information
- Born: June 3, 1988 (age 38) Uberaba, Brazil
- Listed height: 6 ft 9 in (2.06 m)
- Listed weight: 238 lb (108 kg)

Career information
- NBA draft: 2010: undrafted
- Playing career: 2004–present

Career history
- 2004–2006: COC Ribeirão Preto
- 2006–2008: Franca
- 2008–2009: Paulistano
- 2009–2011: São José
- 2011–2014: Pinheiros
- 2014–2015: Limeira
- 2015–2017: Flamengo
- 2017–2018: Franca
- 2018–present: Flamengo

Career highlights
- FIBA Intercontinental Cup champion (2022); 2× FIBA Americas League/Champions League Americas champion (2013, 2021); 3× NBB champion (2016, 2019, 2021); All-NBB Team (2013); NBB All-Star Slam Dunk champion (2010)
Medals
Men's basketball
Representing Brazil
FIBA South American Championship
Gold medal – first place	2010 Colombia
Bronze medal – third place	2014 Venezuela
Silver medal – second place	2016 Caracas
Pan American Games
Gold medal – first place	2015 Toronto
FIBA AmeriCup
Silver medal – second place	2022 Brazil

Rafael "Rafa" Ferreira de Souza, commonly known as Rafael "Rafa" Mineiro, (born June 3, 1988) is a Brazilian professional basketball player. He currently plays with the Flamengo team of the Novo Basquete Brasil, in Brazil.

== Professional career ==
In his pro club career, Mineiro has played in both the South American 2nd-tier level FIBA South American League, and the South American 1st-tier level FIBA Americas League.

== National team career ==
Mineiro represented the senior men's Brazilian national basketball team at the 2015 FIBA AmeriCup, in Mexico City. He also played at the 2017 FIBA AmeriCup.

== NBB career statistics ==
=== NBB regular season ===
†	Denotes seasons in which Rafael Mineiro won NBB championship

Season	Team	GP	MPG	2PT FG%	3PT FG%	FT%	RPG	APG	SPG	BPG	PPG
2009	Paulistano	21	24.6	.557	.214	.685	5.3	.6	.7	.8	11.2
2009–10	São José	10	22.6	.672	.143	.563	4.8	.8	1.2	.1	11.1
2010–11	São José	21	24.3	.554	.256	.667	4.0	1.3	.9	.5	8.2
2011–12	Pinheiros	28	14.0	.678	.188	.600	2.3	.5	.7	.7	5.5
2012–13	Pinheiros	33	32.6	.596	.358	.704	5.1	1.3	.7	.7	13.9
2013–14	Pinheiros	29	30.7	.611	.361	.616	5.1	1.7	.8	1.0	12.4
2014–15	Limeira	25	27.7	.579	.292	.697	4.9	1.6	.6	.7	10.6
2015–16†	Flamengo	28	21.9	.544	.353	.673	3.9	1.1	.4	.6	8.0
2016–17	Flamengo	28	20.2	.531	.323	.620	3.6	1.4	.5	.3	5.9
2017–18	Franca	24	24.5	.577	.259	.662	5.6	1.0	1.0	.4	7.7
2018–19†	Flamengo	26	20.0	.540	.267	.579	4.6	1.2	0.5	.2	6.9
Career		273	24.2	.582	.319	.654	4.4	1.2	.7	.6	9.2

=== NBB playoffs ===
Season	Team	GP	MPG	2PT FG%	3PT FG%	FT%	RPG	APG	SPG	BPG	PPG
2010	São José	7	25.7	.606	.000	.630	4.4	1.6	1.3	.6	8.1
2011	São José	8	25.2	.474	.400	.600	5.3	1.1	1.0	.6	7.9
2012	Pinheiros	7	13.6	.647	.286	.625	2.1	.7	.1	.4	4.7
2013	Pinheiros	10	30.2	.500	.259	.714	3.8	1.4	.5	.7	9.8
2014	Pinheiros	4	34.0	.519	.211	.500	5.3	1.8	.8	1.0	12.0
2015	Limeira	7	21.9	.467	.286	.778	3.0	1.6	.7	.3	7.9
2016†	Flamengo	13	19.5	.533	.250	.600	3.5	.8	.5	.6	7.0
2017	Flamengo	5	21.1	.609	.333	.929	3.8	1.0	.4	1.0	9.4
2017	Franca	3	20.9	.353	.000	1.000	5.0	1.0	.7	.3	4.3
2019†	Flamengo	12	19.2	.510	.231	.480	4.8	.7	.3	.8	6.1
Career		76	22.6	.518	.256	.640	4.0	1.1	.6	.6	7.6
