= Eduardo Machado (basketball) =

Brazilian basketball player (born 1982)

Duda Machado
Personal information
- Born: September 10, 1982 (age 44) Rio de Janeiro, Brazil
- Listed height: 6 ft 5 in (1.96 m)
- Listed weight: 195 lb (88 kg)

Career information
- Playing career: 2002–2021
- Position: Shooting guard / small forward

Career history
- 2002: Londrina
- 2002–2003: Limeira
- 2004: Flamengo
- 2005–2007: Brasília
- 2007–2013: Flamengo
- 2013–2014: Macaé
- 2014: Mackenzie
- 2014–2015: Rio Claro
- 2015–2017: Cearense
- 2017–2018: Bauru
- 2018–2019: CR Vasco da Gama
- 2019–2020: São José
- 2021: Botafogo
- 2021: Corinthians

Career highlights
- FIBA South American League champion (2009); 4× Brazilian champion (2007, 2008, 2009, 2013); NBB All-Star (2009)
Medals
Men's basketball
Representing Brazil
FIBA AmeriCup
Gold medal – first place	2009 San Juan
FIBA South American Championship
Gold medal – first place	2006 Caracas
Gold medal – first place	2010 Neiva

Eduardo Magalhaes Machado, commonly known as Duda Machado (born 10 September 1982 in Rio de Janeiro) is a Brazilian professional basketball player. At a height of 1.96 m (6'5") tall, he plays at the shooting guard and small forward positions.

== Professional career ==
After playing with the youth teams of Fluminense, in his pro club career, Machado has played in both the South American 2nd-tier level FIBA South American League, and the South American top-tier level FIBA Americas League.

== National team career ==
Machado was a member of the senior Brazilian national basketball team. With Brazil, he played at the 2008 FIBA World Olympic Qualifying Tournament. He also won a gold medal at the 2009 FIBA AmeriCup.

== Personal ==
Duda's father, Renê Machado, was a Brazilian club basketball player in the 1960s and 1970s. His uncle, Sérgio "Macarrão" Toledo Machado, was also a successful basketball player with the senior men's Brazilian national basketball team, in the 1960s and 1970s. Duda's older brother, Marcelinho Machado, was also a long-time professional basketball player, and he is one of the most well-known players Brazil ever produced.
