= Rafael Hettsheimeir =

Brazilian-Spanish basketball player

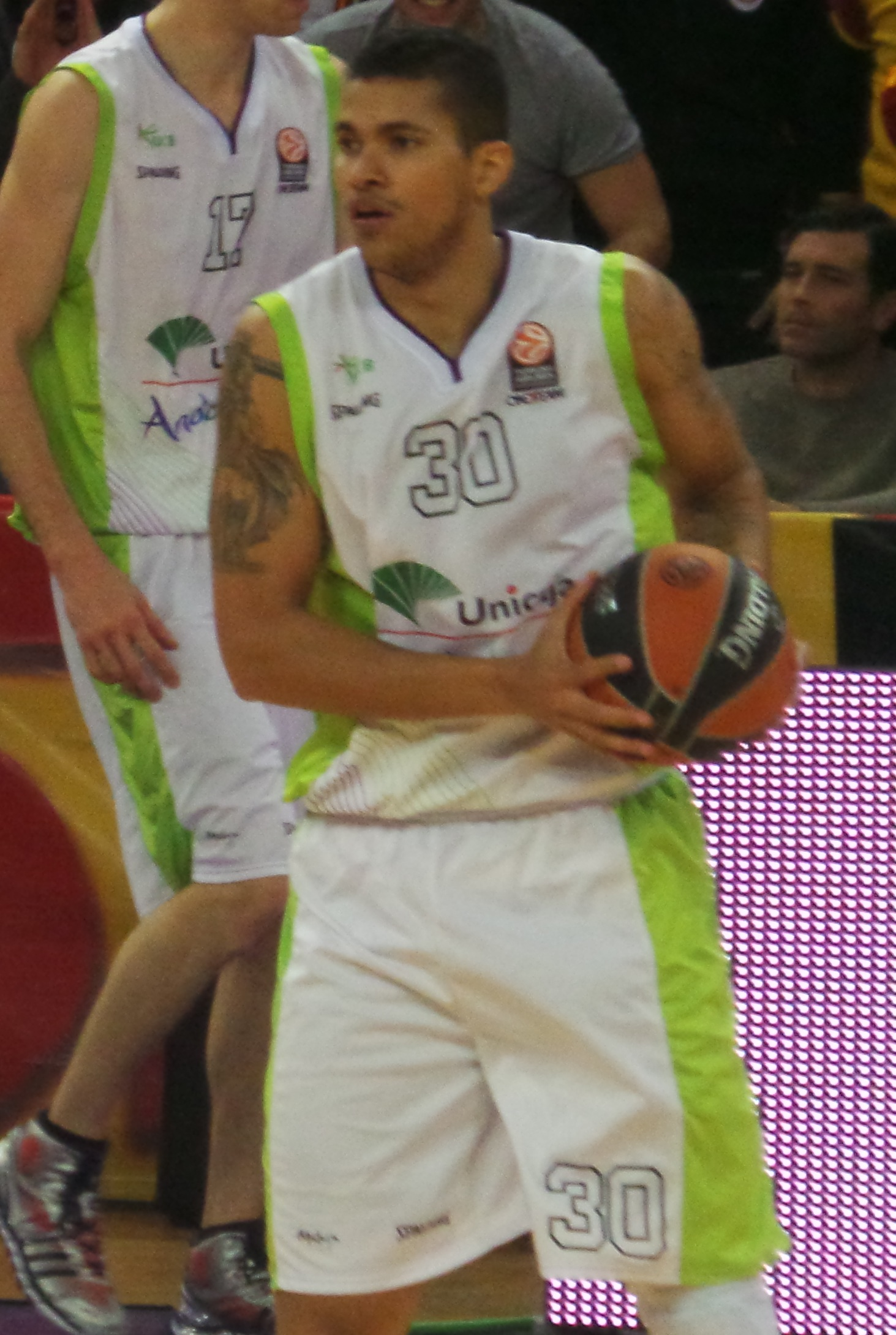
- Hettsheimeir, while playing with Málaga, in 2013.

No. 30 – Flamengo
- Position: Center
- League: NBB; BCL Americas

Personal information
- Born: June 16, 1986 (age 40) Araçatuba, Brazil
- Listed height: 6 ft 10 in (2.08 m)
- Listed weight: 275 lb (125 kg)

Career information
- NBA draft: 2008: undrafted
- Playing career: 2003–present

Career history
- 2003–2005: COC/Ribeirão Preto
- 2005–2007: Vic
- 2007–2009: Plus Pujol Lleida
- 2009–2012: CAI Zaragoza
- 2009–2010: → Obradoiro CAB
- 2012–2013: Real Madrid
- 2013–2014: Unicaja
- 2014–2017: Bauru
- 2017: Fuenlabrada
- 2017: Santeros de Aguada
- 2017–2018: Bauru
- 2018–2020: Franca
- 2020–present: Flamengo

Career highlights
- BCL Americas MVP (2021); Spanish League champion (2013); FIBA Americas League champion (2015); BCL Americas champion (2021); FIBA South American League champion (2014); 3× All-Brazilian League Team (2015, 2016, 2018); NBB All-Star Three-Point champion (2018)
Medals
Men's basketball
Representing Brazil
FIBA AmeriCup
| Gold medal – first place | 2005 Santo Domingo |
| Silver medal – second place | 2011 Mar del Plata |
Pan American Games
| Gold medal – first place | 2015 Toronto |

Rafael Estevão "Rafa" Hettsheimeir (born June 16, 1986) is a Brazilian-Spanish professional basketball player who currently plays for Flamengo in the Novo Basquete Brasil (NBB) and the BCL Americas. He was also member of the Brazilian national basketball team.

== Professional career ==
Hettsheimeir started his senior career in Brazil with Ribeirão Preto, with whom he played from 2003 to 2005. In 2006, he moved to Spain and signed with Akasvayu Vic of the LEB Plata. After two seasons with Vic, he moved to Plus Pujol Lleida of the LEB Oro where he stayed for two seasons.

In the summer of 2009, Hettsheimeir signed with CAI Zaragoza. On November 13, 2009, he was loaned to Obradoiro CAB for three months. On February 11, 2010, he returned to CAI Zaragoza. On May 27, 2010, he signed a new two-year contract with Zaragoza.

On October 30, 2012, Hettsheimeir signed with Real Madrid. With Real he won the 2012–13 ACB championship. After one season, he parted ways with Real. On August 15, 2013, Hettsheimeir signed a two-year deal with Unicaja. After one season, he left Unicaja and returned to Brazil where he signed with Bauru.

On January 26, 2017, Hettsheimeir signed with Montakit Fuenlabrada for the rest of the 2016–17 ACB season. In June 2017, he signed with Santeros de Aguada of the Baloncesto Superior Nacional.

After a couple of seasons playing in Franca, Rafael signed Flamengo Basket for NBB and FIBA America League.

== National team career ==
As a member of the Brazilian national basketball team he won the gold medal at the 2005 FIBA Americas Championship. He also won a silver medal at the 2011 FIBA Americas Championship.

== Career statistics ==
=== NBB regular season ===
| Season | Team | GP | MPG | 2PT FG% | 3PT FG% | FT% | RPG | APG | SPG | BPG | PPG |
|---|---|---|---|---|---|---|---|---|---|---|---|
| 2014–15 | Bauru | 28 | 27.8 | .637 | .408 | .818 | 5.6 | .9 | .9 | .2 | 16.7 |
| 2015–16 | Bauru | 24 | 26.4 | .569 | .394 | .835 | 5.3 | 1.2 | .5 | .2 | 15.2 |
| Career | | 52 | 27.1 | .601 | .402 | .825 | 5.5 | 1.0 | .7 | .2 | 16.0 |
| All-Star | | | | | | | | | | | |

=== NBB playoffs ===
| Season | Team | GP | MPG | 2PT FG% | 3PT FG% | FT% | RPG | APG | SPG | BPG | PPG |
|---|---|---|---|---|---|---|---|---|---|---|---|
| 2015 | Bauru | 12 | 37.5 | .486 | .324 | .800 | 7.1 | .8 | .7 | .3 | 16.0 |
| 2016 | Bauru | 12 | 29.8 | .674 | .340 | .810 | 6.4 | 1.6 | .7 | .1 | 17.9 |
| Career | | 24 | 33.7 | .589 | .330 | .805 | 6.8 | 1.2 | .7 | .2 | 17.0 |
