= Caio Torres =

Brazilian basketball player

Personal information
- Born: June 3, 1987 (age 39) São Paulo, Brazil
- Listed height: 2.10 m (6 ft 11 in)
- Listed weight: 136 kg (300 lb)

Career information
- Playing career: 2002–2022
- Position: Center

Career history
- 2002–2004: Pinheiros
- 2004–2005: CB Guadalajara
- 2005–2008: CB Estudiantes
- 2008–2009: Club Melilla Baloncesto
- 2009–2011: Menorca Bàsquet
- 2011–2013: Flamengo
- 2013–2015: São José
- 2015–2016: Paulistano
- 2016–2018: Mogi das Cruzes
- 2018: Ciclista Olímpico
- 2018–2019: Vasco da Gama
- 2019–2020: Pinheiros

Career highlights
- Brazilian League Finals MVP (2013); 2× All-Brazilian League Team (2013, 2016)
Medals
Men's basketball
Representing Brazil
FIBA AmeriCup
Gold medal – first place	2005 Santo Domingo
Silver medal – second place	2011 Mar del Plata
Pan American Games
Gold medal – first place	2007 Rio de Janeiro
FIBA South American Championship
Silver medal – second place	2004 Rio de Janeiro
Gold medal – first place	2006 Caracas

Caio Aparecido Da Silveira Torres (born 3 June 1987) is a Brazilian former professional basketball player.

== Professional career ==
Torres declared himself eligible for the 2005 NBA draft and 2007 NBA draft, but withdrew prior to both.

Torres has played with São José Basketball and several other clubs in the Brazilian League.

== National team career ==
A member of the senior men's Brazilian national basketball team, Torres played with the squad at the 2006 FIBA World Championship, where Brazil finished in 19th place. He also played at the 2012 Summer Olympics.
