= Nicolás Gianella =

Argentine basketball player

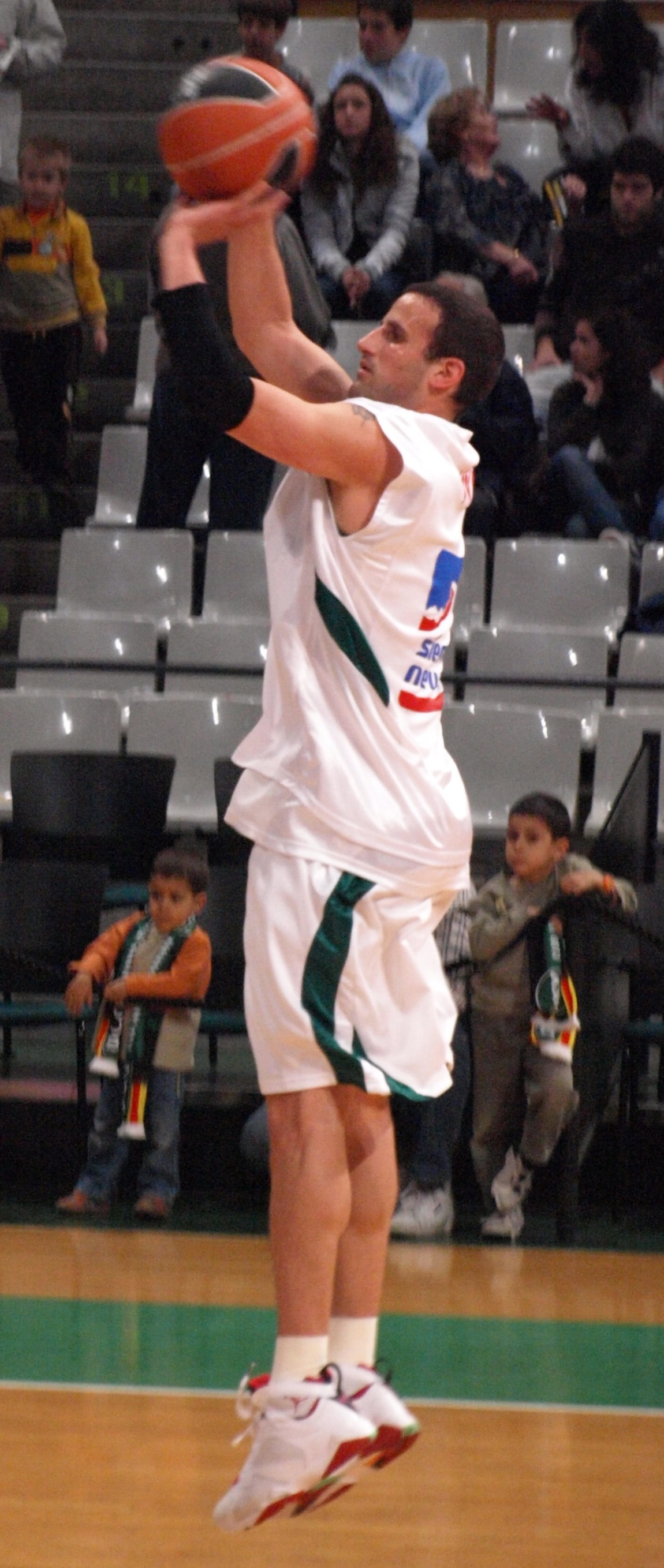

Personal information
- Born: February 14, 1978 (age 48) La Plata, Argentina
- Listed height: 6 ft 3 in (1.91 m)
- Listed weight: 205 lb (88 kg)

Career information
- Playing career: 1997–present
- Position: Point guard

Career history
- 1997-2000: Estudiantes Olavarría
- 2000-2001: Viola Reggio Calabria
- 2001-2002: Gimnasia y Esgrima La Plata
- 2002: León Caja España
- 2002: Tris Rieti
- 2002-2003: Rida Scafati
- 2003-2004: Plasencia
- 2004-2005: Plus Pujol Lleida
- 2005-2011: CB Granada
- 2011-2012: Bennet Cantù
Medals
Men's basketball
Representing Argentina
South American Championship
Bronze medal – third place	2006 Caracas	National team

Carlos Nicolás Gianella (born February 14, 1978, in La Plata) is an Argentine professional basketball player, currently playing for Boca Juniors.

He has played basketball in Argentina, Italy, and Spain

== Honours ==
Argentina

- South American Championships Bronze Medal: 1
  - 2006

Estudiantes Olavarría

- LNB: 1
  - 2000
