= Shamell Stallworth =

American basketball player (born 1980)

Caxias do Sul Basquete
- Position: Shooting guard / small forward
- League: NBB

Personal information
- Born: September 7, 1980 (age 46) Alabama, U.S.
- Listed height: 6 ft 4.75 in (1.95 m)
- Listed weight: 212 lb (96 kg)

Career information
- High school: Washington Union (Fresno, California)
- College: San Francisco (1999–2003)
- NBA draft: 2003: undrafted
- Playing career: 2003–present

Career history
- 2004: Araraquara
- 2004–2007: Paulistano
- 2007–2008: Zadar
- 2008–2009: Limeira
- 2009–2013: Pinheiros
- 2013: Marinos de Anzoátegui
- 2013–2014: Pinheiros
- 2014–2019: Mogi das Cruzes
- 2019–2023: São Paulo
- 2023–2024: Mogi das Cruzes
- 2024: CDSC Puerto Varas
- 2024–present: Caxias do Sul Basquete

Career highlights
- BCL Americas champion (2022); FIBA Americas League champion (2013); FIBA Americas League Grand Finals MVP (2013); 2× FIBA Americas League Top Scorer (2013, 2016); FIBA South American League champion (2016); FIBA South American League MVP (2016); Brazilian League Best Foreign Player (2016); 15× Brazilian All-Star (2009–2019, 2021-2023, 2025); 3× Brazilian All-Star Game MVP (2009, 2016, 2017)

Shamell Jermaine Stallworth, commonly known in Brazil simply as Shamell (born September 7, 1980), is an American professional basketball player. His nickname is "Showmell". With E.C. Pinheiros from São Paulo, he won the 2013 FIBA Americas League.

== College career ==
Shamell played for four seasons of college basketball in the NCAA Division I (North American university championship), representing the University of San Francisco, where he played with the San Francisco Dons.

== Professional career ==
In 2004, Shamell came to Brazil and stayed three months in Araraquara, playing in the quarterfinals of the Paulista state championship. The following year, he moved to Paulistano, where in his first season there, playing next to the Paulista wing Renato Lamas, his team finished second in the Paulista state championship. That same season, Shamell was chosen for the selection of the Brazilian Championship, alongside Nezinho dos Santos, Alex Garcia, Ricardo Probst, and Murilo Becker. In August 2007, Shamell moved to the Croatian club Zadar of the Adriatic League and the European 2nd-tier level EuroCup, where he played until June 2008. At the end of his contract, Shamell moved to the Chinese Basketball Association to play for Zhejiang Cyclone.

However, he only played two months with the club, due to adjustment problems of his family, and he chose to return to Brazil to play, a nation which he declared to be his new home. He joined Winner Limeira, where he won the Paulista state regional championship in 2008–09. The fans of that club still remember him. In 2009, "Showmell" went to Pinheiros, a club that later would become a great rival of his former team Paulistano.

Playing for the team of São Paulo, Shamell helped formed a great squad, alongside Marquinhos, Olivinha, and Juan Pablo Figueroa, winning the first Paulista state title in club history, and leading the team to two consecutive semifinals in the NBB. Moreover, Pinheiros, led by these players, was twice the runner-up in the InterLeagues Tournament, losing to Obras Sanitarias in 2011, and to Peñarol Mar del Plata in 2012 . Also in 2011, the club was the runner-up in the FIBA South American League, losing again to Obras Sanitarias.

But in 2013, Shamell, playing alongside Márcio Dornelles, Rafael Mineiro, Joe Smith, and Paulinho Boracini, led Pinheiros to the FIBA Americas League title. It was the first time he played at the Final Four of the tournament. Shamell was named the MVP of the Final Four's Grand Final. In June 2013, he signed with Marinos de Anzoátegui of the Venezuelan League.

He then returned to Pinheiros. In 2014, he moved to Mogi das Cruzes, where he stayed until 2019. Stallworth then signed with São Paulo prior to the 2019–20 season.

On May 18, 2024, Stallworth signed with CDSC Puerto Varas. On October 7, 2024, Stallworth signed with Caxias do Sul Basquete.

== Brazilian League statistics ==
Legend
| GP | Games played | GS | Games started | MPG | Minutes per game |
| FG% | Field goal percentage | 3P% | 3-point field goal percentage | FT% | Free throw percentage |
| RPG | Rebounds per game | APG | Assists per game | SPG | Steals per game |
| BPG | Blocks per game | PPG | Points per game | **Bold** | Career high |

| Led the league |

=== NBB regular season ===
| Season | Team | GP | MPG | FG% | 3PT% | FT% | RPG | APG | SPG | BPG | PPG |
|---|---|---|---|---|---|---|---|---|---|---|---|
| 2008–09 | Limeira | 21 | 32.9 | **.541** | **.437** | **.874** | 4.2 | 2.8 | **2.0** | .1 | 20.6 |
| 2009–10 | Pinheiros | 26 | **38.1** | .500 | .414 | .809 | 4.1 | 3.5 | 1.8 | .1 | **22.5** |
| 2010–11 | Pinheiros | 28 | 33.4 | .522 | .410 | .792 | 3.3 | 3.8 | 1.2 | .1 | 19.2 |
| 2011–12 | Pinheiros | 26 | 31.7 | .538 | .417 | .761 | 3.6 | 2.5 | 1.6 | **.2** | 19.7 |
| 2012–13 | Pinheiros | **34** | 33.1 | .537 | .414 | .758 | 4.1 | 3.2 | 1.1 | .1 | 15.7 |
| 2013–14 | Pinheiros | 31 | 35.6 | .508 | .397 | .815 | **4.8** | **4.0** | 1.7 | .1 | 21.0 |
| **Career** | | 166 | 34.1 | .522 | .414 | .802 | 4.0 | 3.3 | 1.6 | .1 | 19.6 |
| All-Star | | 6 | – | – | – | – | – | – | – | – | - |

=== NBB playoffs ===
| Season | Team | GP | MPG | FG% | 3PT% | FT% | RPG | APG | SPG | BPG | PPG |
|---|---|---|---|---|---|---|---|---|---|---|---|
| 2009 | Limeira | 4 | 33.7 | .422 | .208 | **.900** | 3.5 | 2.7 | 1.2 | **.5** | 13.5 |
| 2010 | Pinheiros | 6 | **36.3** | .461 | .367 | .714 | 2.8 | 3.2 | **1.7** | .0 | **19.5** |
| 2011 | Pinheiros | 9 | 36.1 | .466 | .362 | .804 | 3.9 | 2.8 | 1.1 | .2 | 18.4 |
| 2012 | Pinheiros | 8 | 31.8 | .459 | .258 | .739 | 3.9 | 2.1 | 1.0 | .0 | 13.9 |
| 2013 | Pinheiros | **10** | 31.1 | **.536** | **.431** | .769 | **5.9** | **4.5** | 1.2 | .1 | 18.0 |
| **Career** | | 37 | 35.2 | .575 | .325 | .785 | 4.0 | 3.1 | 1.3 | .2 | 16.7 |
