= David Jackson (basketball) =

American basketball player (born 1982)

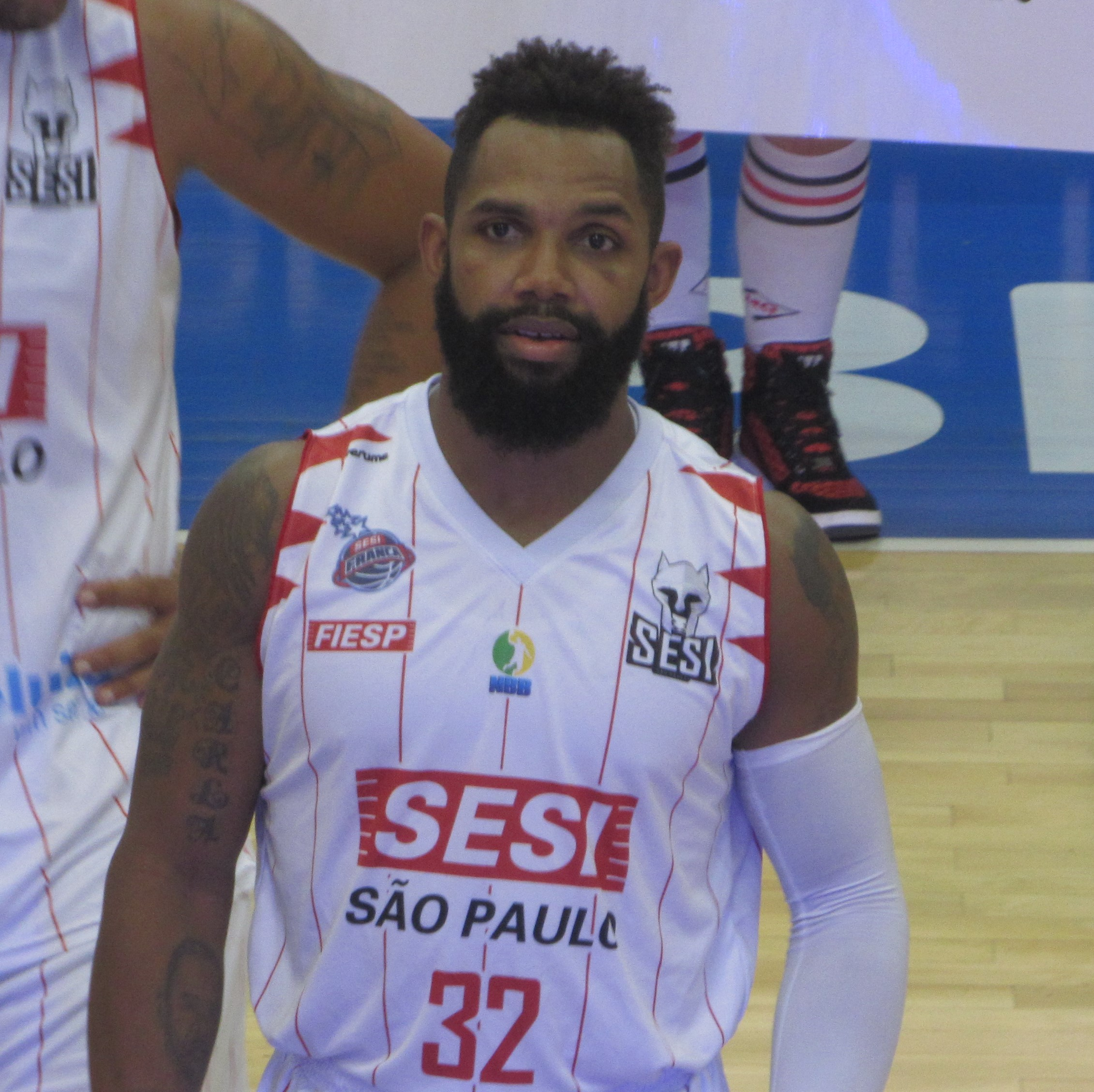
- Jackson while playing for Franca in 2019

No. 32 – Franca
- Position: Shooting guard / point guard
- League: NBB; BCL Americas

Personal information
- Born: August 12, 1982 (age 44) Rockville, Maryland, U.S.
- Listed height: 6 ft 3.75 in (1.92 m)
- Listed weight: 207 lb (94 kg)

Career information
- High school: High Point (Beltsville, Maryland); Bonner Academy (Raleigh, North Carolina)
- College: Gulf Coast CC (2003–2005); Penn State (2005–2007)
- NBA draft: 2007: undrafted
- Playing career: 2007–present

Career history
- 2007–2008: Defensor Sporting
- 2008: Grises de Humacao
- 2008–2009: Peñarol Mar del Plata
- 2009–2011: La Unión
- 2011: Flamengo
- 2011: Guaiqueríes de Margarita
- 2011–2012: Flamengo
- 2012–2013: Gimnasia Indalo
- 2013: Cangrejeros de Santurce
- 2013–2015: Winner/Kabum Limeira
- 2015–2016: Quimsa
- 2016: Vasco da Gama
- 2016: Quimsa
- 2016–2018: Vasco da Gama
- 2018–2020: Franca
- 2020–2021: Minas
- 2021–present: Franca

Career highlights
- FIBA Intercontinental Cup champion (2023); FIBA Intercontinental Cup MVP (2023); Champions League Americas champion (2023); Liga Sudamericana de Básquetbol MVP (2018); Liga Sudamericana de Básquetbol winner (2018); 4× Paulista State Championship (2018, 2019, 2022, 2024); 4× Brazilian League champion (2022, 2023, 2024, 2025); Liga Nacional de Baloncesto Profesional champion (2020); NBB MVP Award (2014); 4× NBB Best Foreign Player (2014, 2015, 2020, 2021); 4× All-NBB Team (2014, 2019, 2021, 2023); 11× NBB All-Star (2012, 2014, 2015, 2017–2019, 2021-2025); Carioca State Championship (2011); LNB Top Scorer (2010); LNB MVP (2009); 4× LNB All-Star (2009–2011, 2013); 2× LNB All-Star Game MVP (2011, 2013)

David Wayne Jackson Jr. (born August 12, 1982) is an American professional basketball player for Franca of Novo Basquete Brasil (NBB). A 6 ft 3 in (1.92 m) tall combo guard, he played high school basketball in Maryland and North Carolina and attended Gulf Coast Community College in Florida after he failed to academically qualify to play Division I basketball. After two years at Gulf Coast, Jackson transferred to Penn State, where he played his last two years of eligibility. After going undrafted in the 2007 NBA draft he started his professional career in Uruguay with Defensor Sporting. He has earned several accolades while playing in South America, including two MVP awards (one in Argentina and one in Brazil), multiple all-star selections and an LNB scoring title in 2010. Jackson won the FIBA Intercontinental Cup in 2023 and was named the tournament MVP.

== High school career ==
Jackson was born in Rockville, Maryland and resided in Gaithersburg, Maryland, attending High Point High School in nearby Beltsville, where he played the point guard position. After the end of his senior season in 2000–01, Jackson suffered a foot injury and failed to academically qualify for college basketball, scoring too low on the ACT and having to renounce to the only offer he received from Gettysburg College, a Division III school. After graduating high school he worked in an assisted living center before deciding to attend Bonner Academy, a prep school in Raleigh, North Carolina, trying to improve his grades and take the SAT to qualify for NCAA Division I basketball.

== College career ==
Jackson visited several community colleges in Florida before joining Gulf Coast Community College in Panama City, Florida. In two years there he was a two-time All-Panhandle Conference selection and in his sophomore year he averaged 18.2 points, 6.4 rebounds and 3.5 assists per game, leading the state of Florida in 3-point percentage at 55%.

Jackson's performance at Gulf Coast earned him the attention of several Division I schools, and he received offers from Auburn, Penn State, West Virginia and South Carolina. He narrowed his choice between Auburn and Penn State, and ultimately signed to play for the latter in April 2005. He decided to major in business management. In his first year at Penn State he wore jersey number 32 and started all the 30 games he played, averaging 6.7 points, 3.2 rebounds and 2.9 assists in 29.2 minutes per game, ranking 5th in the team in scoring, 4th in rebounding and 2nd in assists behind Ben Luber, shooting 37.1% from the field and 29.3% from three. The following year at Penn State he played with another player named David Jackson (also known as DJ Jackson), and he started 21 out of 30 games, averaging 6.6 points, 3.1 rebounds and 2.3 assists in 24.8 minutes per game. He posted career-highs in all shooting categories, recording percentages of 41.7% from the field, 37.1% from three and 83.6% from the free throw line.

=== College statistics ===
| Year | Team | GP | GS | MPG | FG% | 3P% | FT% | RPG | APG | SPG | BPG | PPG |
|---|---|---|---|---|---|---|---|---|---|---|---|---|
| 2005–06 | Penn State | 30 | 30 | 29.2 | .371 | .293 | .717 | 3.2 | 2.9 | 0.9 | 0.1 | 6.7 |
| 2006–07 | Penn State | 30 | 21 | 24.8 | .417 | .371 | .836 | 3.1 | 2.3 | 0.9 | 0.0 | 6.6 |
| Career | | 60 | 51 | 27.0 | .392 | .327 | .774 | 3.2 | 2.6 | 0.9 | 0.1 | 6.7 |

== Professional career ==
=== Beginnings and MVP in Argentina ===
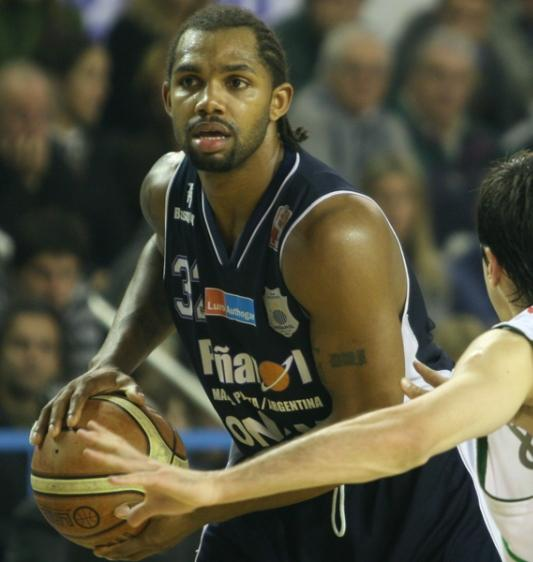
Jackson playing for Peñarol

After the end of his college career, Jackson was automatically eligible for the NBA draft, but he went undrafted. He decided to join Defensor Sporting in Uruguay and he played in the LUB (21 points per game over 42 appearances and a career-high of 38 points in a game against Soriano) and in the 2007–08 FIBA Americas League, where in 6 games played he averaged 24.5 points, 3.2 rebounds and 3.7 assists, shooting 57.1% from the field, 45.2% from three and 82.4% from the free throw line. In March 2008 moved to Puerto Rico, where he played 11 games in the Baloncesto Superior Nacional with Grises de Humacao, averaging 8.1 points, 4.3 rebounds and 2.4 assists per game.

In 2008 he joined Peñarol Mar del Plata, and he played 58 games averaging 18.4 points, 3.7 rebounds, 1.8 assists and 1.4 steals per game, shooting 55.4% from the field and 50.4% from three: he was named League MVP, the first foreigner to receive the award. He then transferred to La Unión in June 2009, and in his first season with the new team he led the league in scoring with 18.9 points per game, winning the Top Scorer title at the end of the season: he shot 57.7% from the field (43.8% from three) and 86.6% from the free throw line. He also played with La Unión for the following season, where over 51 games he averaged 19.4 points, 3.7 rebounds and 1.5 assists.

=== The first period in Brazil ===
In 2011 he moved to Brazil, signing for Flamengo: he played in the Carioca State Championship, winning the title, and then moved to Venezuela, where he played for Guaiqueríes de Margarita. He then returned to Flamengo to play in the 2011–12 NBB season: over 38 games he played 32.2 minutes per game, averaging 16.2 points, 2.7 rebounds, 2.4 assists per game on 61.6% field goal percentage, 49.6% from three 92.5% from the free throw line, thus recording a 60–40–90 season. He also played in the 2011 Liga Sudamericana de Básquetbol, being eliminated in the second stage. In 2012 he went back to Argentina, joining Gimnasia Indalo, being the first foreign player to sign for the team. In 50 games he averaged 17.6 points, 3.1 rebounds and 1.9 assists, shooting 56.6% from the field, 44% from three and 91.2% from the line.

In April 2013 he signed for Cangrejeros de Santurce in Puerto Rico and played 35 games: he then returned to Brazil, signing for Winner/Kabum Limeira in the month of August. He played in the Paulista State Championship and in the NBB. In the 2013–14 NBB season he averaged 20.6 points, 4 rebounds and 2.3 assists in 32.5 minutes per game over 37 games, shooting 48.8% from three and 92.9% from the free throw line, being named in the All-NBB Team and receiving the MVP and the Best Foreign Player awards. In the following season he again played for Limeira, and over 34 appearances he posted averages of 16.6 points, 3.8 rebounds and 3.2 assists. He also shot a career-best 94.8% from the free throw line.

=== Quimsa and Vasco da Gama ===
In 2015 Jackson left Brazil and joined Quimsa, an Argentine team of Santiago del Estero. In 47 LNB games he averaged 13.7 points, 4.1 rebounds and 2 assists per game, and also played in the 2016 FIBA Americas League where he averaged 8.3 points and 4.7 rebounds over 6 games. He then joined Vasco da Gama where he played in the Liga Ouro, the second level of Brazilian basketball, obtaining the promotion to NBB.

For the 2016–17 season Jackson briefly joined Quimsa and then signed for Vasco da Gama, where he competed in the 2016–17 NBB season averaging 17 points per game in 27 appearances, shooting 44.4% from three. In the 2017–18 season he again played in 27 games, averaging 15.4 points in 31.4 minutes per game.

=== Franca ===
In July 2018 Jackson signed for Franca. He won the Paulista State Championship in 2018 with the team, and competed in the 2018–19 NBB season, playing 35 games with averages of 16.7 points, 4.1 rebounds and 2.7 assists in 30.5 minutes per game, shooting 46.9% from three. Jackson won the 2018 Liga Sudamericana de Básquetbol with Franca, and was named the Most Valuable Player of the competition.

=== Minas ===
On December 1, 2020, Jackson signed with Minas.

=== Return to Franca ===
On June 7, 2021, Franca announced the return of Jackson. On April 16, 2023, Jackson won the continental Basketball Champions League Americas championship with Franca. He also won the NBB championship in 2022 and 2023, and was named to the league's All-First Team again in 2023. On September 24, 2023, he won the FIBA Intercontinental Cup with Franca, being named the competition's MVP.
