= Léonardo Meindl =

Brazilian basketball player (born 1993)

Léo Meindl
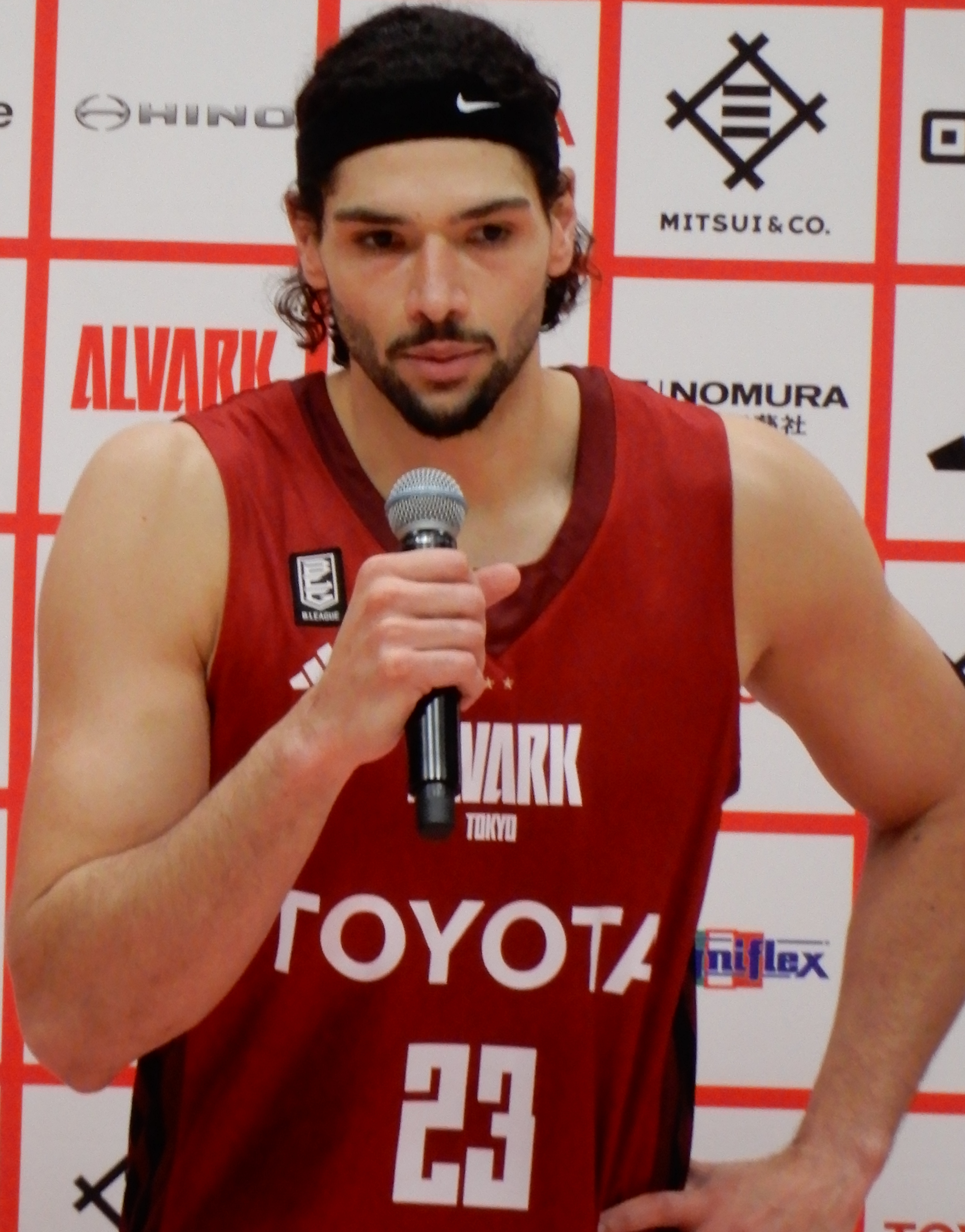
- Meindl with the Alvark Tokyo in 2024

No. 8 – Obradoiro CAB
- Position: Small forward
- League: Liga ACB

Personal information
- Born: March 20, 1993 (age 33) São Paulo, Brazil
- Listed height: 2.01 m (6 ft 7 in)
- Listed weight: 100 kg (220 lb)

Career information
- NBA draft: 2015: undrafted
- Playing career: 2011–present

Career history
- 2011–2015: Franca
- 2015–2017: Bauru
- 2017–2018: Franca
- 2018–2019: Paulistano
- 2019–2020: São Paulo
- 2020–2022: Fuenlabrada
- 2022–2023: U-BT Cluj-Napoca
- 2023–2025: Alvark Tokyo
- 2025–2026: San Pablo Burgos
- 2026–present: Obradoiro

Career highlights
- Romanian League champion (2023); Romanian League Finals MVP (2023); Romanian Cup winner (2023); Romanian Cup Finals MVP (2023); NBB Sixth Man (2013)
Medals
Men's basketball
Representing Brazil
FIBA AmeriCup
Silver medal – second place	2022 Brazil
FIBA South American Championship
Bronze medal – third place	2014 Venezuela
Silver medal – second place	2016 Venezuela
Pan American Games
Gold medal – first place	2015 Toronto

Leonardo "Léo" Meindl (born March 20, 1993) is a Brazilian professional basketball player for Obradoiro of the Spanish Liga ACB. He formerly played for Paulistano of the Novo Basquete Brasil in Brazil.

== Professional career ==
Meindl began his pro club career in 2011, with the Brazilian League club Franca. He was named the Brazilian League 6th Man of the Year in 2013. Meindl signed with Fuenlabrada in 2020 and averaged 11 points and 5.8 rebounds per game. He re-signed with the team on June 26, 2021.

On August 7, 2022, he signed with U-BT Cluj-Napoca of the Liga Națională.

On July 21, 2023, Meindl signed with Alvark Tokyo of the Japanese B.League. On June 14, 2024, he re-signed with Alvark Tokyo.

On July 10, 2025, he signed with San Pablo Burgos of the Spanish Liga ACB.

On July 15, 2026, he signed with Obradoiro of the Spanish Liga ACB.

== National team career ==
Meindl represented the senior Brazilian national basketball team at the 2015 FIBA AmeriCup, in Mexico City. He also played at the 2017 FIBA AmeriCup.

He represented Brazil in the 2024 Paris Olympics.
