= Nezinho dos Santos =

Brazilian basketball player

Personal information
- Born: 21 January 1981 (age 45) Araraquara, Brazil
- Listed height: 6 ft 1 in (1.85 m)
- Listed weight: 165 lb (75 kg)

Career information
- Playing career: 2000–2021
- Position: Point guard

Career history
- 2000–2006: COC Ribeirão Preto
- 2006–2007: Brasília
- 2008–2009: Limeira
- 2009–2014: Brasília
- 2014–2015: Limeira
- 2015–2016: Franca
- 2016–2018: Vasco da Gama
- 2018–2021: Universo Brasília

Career highlights
- 5× Brazilian champion (2003, 2007, 2010–2012); Brazilian League Sixth Man of the year (2010); 3× Brazilian All-Star (2010–2012); Brazilian All-Star Skills Challenge champion (2014)
Medals
Men's basketball
Representing Brazil
FIBA AmeriCup
Gold medal – first place	2005 Santo Domingo
Silver medal – second place	2011 Mar del Plata
FIBA South American Championship
Silver medal – second place	2004 Rio de Janeiro
Gold medal – first place	2006 Caracas
Gold medal – first place	2010 Neiva

Welington Reginaldo "Nezinho" dos Santos, also commonly known simply as Nezinho (born 21 January 1981 in Araraquara) is a Brazilian former professional basketball player. He also represented the senior Brazilian national team. At a height of 1.85 m (6 ft 1 in) tall, he played at the point guard position.

== Professional career ==
Dos Santos was the Brazilian League's Sixth Man of the Year in 2010.

== National team career ==
Dos Santos was a member of the senior Brazilian national basketball team. With Brazil, he played at some of the following major tournaments: the 2005 FIBA AmeriCup, the 2006 FIBA World Cup, the 2007 FIBA AmeriCup, the 2010 FIBA World Cup, and the 2011 FIBA AmeriCup.
