= Ginásio Pedrocão =

Indoor sporting arena

Ginásio Poliesportivo Pedro Morilla Fuentes
- Ginásio Pedrocão
- Interactive map of Ginásio Poliesportivo Pedro Morilla Fuentes
- Location: Franca; Brazil
- Coordinates: 20.560709350937746°S 47.40731685358672°W
- Owner: Municipality of Franca
- Capacity: 6,000
- Type: indoor sporting arena

Construction
- Opened: 19 January 1975

Tenant
- Franca Basketball

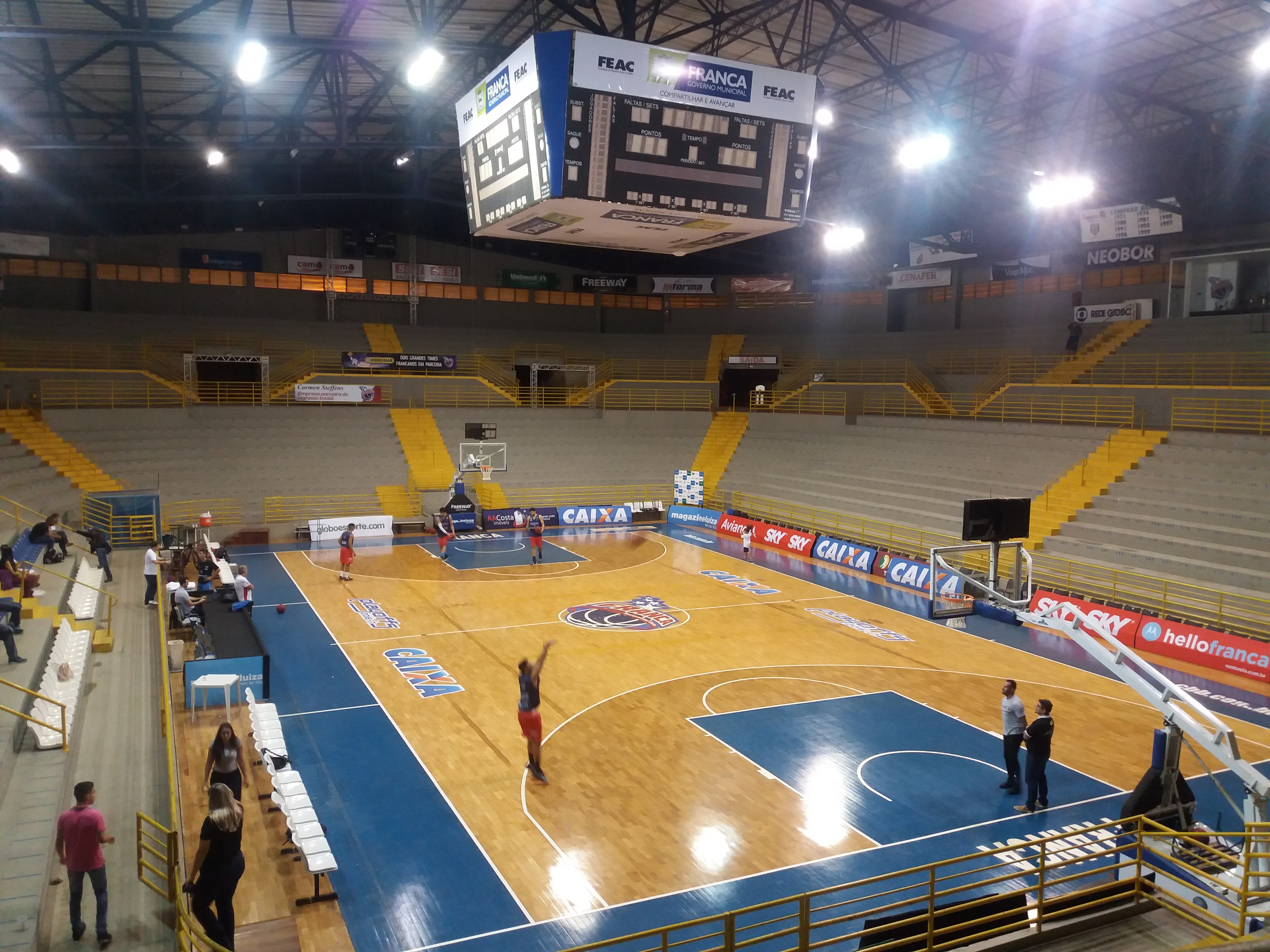
Ginásio Pedrocão arena

The Ginásio Pedrocão (Ginásio Poliesportivo Pedro Morilla Fuentes) is an indoor arena and the home of Franca Basketball Club in the NBB. It was established in 1975 and renamed "Pedrocão" in 1996 to honor coach and team idol Pedro Morilla Fuentes (Pedroca) who led the team from 1959 to 1981. The arena also hosts matches for the Brazil men's national basketball team.
