= Associação Macaé de Basquete =

Macaé Basquete
- Leagues: NBB
- Founded: 2001; 25 years ago
- Arena: Ginásio Tênis Clube de Macaé
- Capacity: 3,000
- Location: Macaé, Brazil
- Team colors: White, Royal Blue and Light Royal Blue
- President: (Brazil) Maria Florêncio
- Head coach: (Brazil) Léo Costa
- Website: macaebasquete.com.br
Home	Away

Associação Macaé de Basquete, or simply Macaé Basquete, is a Brazilian professional basketball team that is headquartered in Macaé, Brazil. The team was founded with the priority of reaching the top-tier level league in the country, the Novo Basquete Brasil (NBB), which it eventually accomplished.

== History ==
The team was founded with great support from the population of Macaé, who welcomed the team with much affection, and crowded the Ginásio Juquinha in all team games during its difficult campaign towards making it to the top-tier level professional basketball league in Brazil, NBB. To get to the NBB, Macaé first had to play in the Southeast Brazil Cup, where the top three teams of the tournament were qualified to the Brazilian Super Cup. In the first phase of the Southeast Brazil Cup, the team finished in first place, with 8 wins and 2 losses. Macaé managed to reach the semifinals of the competition, but was eliminated by Rio Claro, team that won the tournament. In the end, Macaé, Rio Claro, and Fluminense, qualified for the national Brazilian Super Cup tournament, which brought together the best teams from regional tournaments.

In the Brazilian Super Cup, Macaé finished the first phase in first place, with two wins and no losses. In the semifinals, the team faced Rio Claro again, but this time got the win, and qualified for the final, and consequently, for the Tournament Access/Descent to the NBB. Macaé was defeated in the finals by Fluminense, but both teams earned the right to play in a group of three teams in a Tournament Access/Descent to the NBB, with the penultimate set of the 2012–13 NBB season, Tijuca Tênis Clube. With 1 win and 1 loss, the team finished the tournament in second place, behind Tijuca, which managed 2 wins in 2 games. Thus, Tijuca managed to stay in the elite of Brazilian pro club basketball, while Macaé also earned a place in the NBB, the club's first.

After qualifying for the NBB, the board of Macaé began a series of renewals of contracts of the major players of the club's NBB qualification run: the American point guard Jamaal Smith, the Argentine power forward Pablo Espinoza, the experienced center, Atilio de Mello, and the young talent João Phyllipe Bernardi. In addition, the team began to invest heavily in signing other players with good contracts, with the intention of having a successful debut season in the NBB.

The first player signed was the veteran Márcio Dornelles, who had won a FIBA Americas League championship with Pinheiros, in 2013, and was one of the key players in that title. Besides him, the Argentine center Juan Manuel Torres was also signed, coming from Fluminense. But the club's most important signing was undoubtedly that of shooting guard Duda Machado, who had been the sixth man of the Flamengo, the team that had just won the NBB championship.

== Roster ==
Note: Flags indicate national team eligibility at FIBA-sanctioned events. Players may hold other non-FIBA nationalities not displayed.

Macaé Basquete roster
Players
Coaches

Pos.	No.	Nat.	Name	Ht.
G	1	(United States)	Benzor Simmons
PG	2	(Brazil)	Marcio de Mattos
PG	4	(Brazil)	Thiago Carneiro
G	8	(United States)	Lewis Leonard
PF	10	(Brazil)	Erick Camilo
F	22	(Brazil)	Carlos Silva

Head coach

- (Brazil) Léo Costa

Assistant coach(es)

- (Brazil) Pablo Costa
- (Brazil) Bruno Gonzalez

Legend

- (C) Team captain
- Injured

- Roster
Updated: 2017-11-17

== Honors and titles ==
=== National ===
- Brazilian Basketball Super Cup
  - Runners-up: 2013

=== Regional ===
- Rio de Janeiro State Championship
  - Runners-up (3): 2013, 2014, 2015

== Notable players ==
Note: Flags indicate national team eligibility at FIBA-sanctioned events. Players may hold other non-FIBA nationalities not displayed.

Criteria

To appear in this section a player must have either:

- Set a club record or won an individual award while at the club
- Played at least one official international match for their national team at any time
- Played at least one official NBA match at any time.

- (Brazil) Andre Bresolin
- (Brazil) Eddy Carvalho
- (Brazil) Ricardo De Bem
- (Brazil) Márcio Dornelles
- (Brazil) Duda Machado
- (Trinidad and Tobago) Ian Young
- (United States) Kendall Anthony
