= Associação Limeirense de Basquete =

Winner Limeira Basquete
- Leagues: NBB; FIBA South American League
- Founded: 2001; 25 years ago
- Arena: Ginásio "Vô" Lucato
- Capacity: 1,200
- Location: Limeira, Brazil
- Team colors: White, Blue and Orange
- President: (Brazil) Osmar de Paula Junior
- Championships: 1 Brazilian Championship
- Website: limeirabasquete.com.br
Home	Away

Associação Limeirense de Basquete, also commonly known as Basquete Limeira, and known as Winner/Kabum Limeira for sponsorship reasons, is a Brazilian professional basketball team that is based in Limeira, São Paulo, Brazil.

== History ==
Winner Limeira was founded in 2001, with the intention of rescuing club basketball in Limeira, and competing for both state and national titles. In its first year, Limeira won the second division of the State Championship and the Regional Games. Over the following eight years, Limeira won the Regional Games, and also won its first Brazilian championship, which was named the Nossa Liga de Basquete, in 2006.

In the club's first NBB season, was the 2009 NBB season. In that season, with a core group of players consisting of Nezinho dos Santos, Betinho Duarte, Shamell Stallworth, Guilherme Teichmann, and Bruno Fiorotto, they finished in fifth place in the league, after being defeated by Joinville. Limeira did not participate in the second season of the NBB.

In the following two seasons, Limeira had similar campaigns, finishing in ninth place. In the 2014 FIBA South American League, Limeira advanced from the preliminary round, with two wins and one loss, but only won one out of three games in the semifinals.

== Roster ==
Note: Flags indicate national team eligibility at FIBA-sanctioned events. Players may hold other non-FIBA nationalities not displayed.

Winner Limeira roster
Players
Coaches

Pos.	No.	Nat.	Name	Ht.
F	6	(Brazil)	Dalla, Matheus	1.97 m (6 ft 6 in)
C	8	(Brazil)	Mineiro, Rafael	2.09 m (6 ft 10 in)
G	9	(Brazil)	Ramos, Deryk	1.85 m (6 ft 1 in)
F/C	10	(Brazil)	Teichmann, Guilherme	2.04 m (6 ft 8 in)
G/F	14	(Dominican Republic)	Ramón, Ronald (C)	1.86 m (6 ft 1 in)
C	15	(Brazil)	Pereira, Matheus	2.02 m (6 ft 8 in)
F/C	17	(Brazil)	Sommer, Dú	2.04 m (6 ft 8 in)
C	21	(Brazil)	Fiorotto, Bruno	2.08 m (6 ft 10 in)
G	23	(Brazil)	dos Santos, Nezinho	1.84 m (6 ft 0 in)
F	28	(Brazil)	Lima, Higor	1.94 m (6 ft 4 in)
G/F	32	(United States)	Jackson, David	1.95 m (6 ft 5 in)
F	33	(Brazil)	Ferraz, Nicolas	1.91 m (6 ft 3 in)
F	34	(Brazil)	Oliveira, Leonardo	1.96 m (6 ft 5 in)
F/C	99	(United States)	Hayes, Chris	2.07 m (6 ft 9 in)

Head coach

- (Brazil) Dedé Barbosa

Assistant coach(es)

- (Brazil) Jece Leite
- (Brazil) Otávio Troyano

Legend

- (C) Team captain
- Injured

- Roster
Updated: 2014-12-04

== Honors and titles ==
=== National ===
- Brazilian Championship
  - Champions (1): 2006

=== Regional ===
- São Paulo State Championship
  - Champions (2): 2008, 2010
  - Runners-up (2): 2004, 2014

=== Other Tournaments ===
- Regional Games
  - Winners (11): 2001, 2002, 2003, 2004, 2005, 2006, 2007, 2008, 2009, 2011, 2012
- EPTV Cup
  - Winners (1): 2008

== Noted players ==
Note: Flags indicate national team eligibility at FIBA-sanctioned events. Players may hold other non-FIBA nationalities not displayed.

Criteria

To appear in this section a player must have either:

- Set a club record or won an individual award while at the club
- Played at least one official international match for their national team at any time
- Played at least one official NBA match at any time.

- (Brazil) Duda Machado
- (Brazil) Rafa Mineiro
- (Brazil) Deryk Evandro Ramos

== Head coaches ==
- (Brazil) Demétrius Conrado Ferraciú
