= Liga Sorocabana de Basquete =

Liga Sorocabana
- Leagues: NBB
- Founded: 1997; 29 years ago
- Arena: Ginásio Gualberto Moreira (capacity: 3,000)
- Location: Sorocaba, Brazil
- Team colors: White, Light Blue and Orange
- Main sponsor: CASE; Objetivo
- President: (Brazil) Rinaldo Rodrigues
- Head coach: (Brazil) Rinaldo Rodrigues
- Website: lsbasquete.com.br
Home	Away	Third

Liga Sorocabana de Basquete, or simply LSB, as it is known, is a Brazilian basketball team from Sorocaba, São Paulo state. The team receives financial support from partners such as Case, Flextronics, Intermédica and Objetivo Sorocaba.

== History ==
The team was founded in 1997, but the first conquest of only highlight came in 2011, when he reached the final of the Super Copa Brasil, losing to the team of the Tijuca Tênis Clube. But the team won the right to compete in the NBB 2011-2012. For the competition, LSB hired the American point guard Kenny Dawkins, who led the team throughout the championship to the eleventh place in the regular season. In the playoffs, LSB was beaten by Bauru, after a series by 3-0.

== Roster ==
Note: Flags indicate national team eligibility at FIBA-sanctioned events. Players may hold other non-FIBA nationalities not displayed.

Liga Sorocabana roster
Players
Coaches

Pos.	No.	Nat.	Name	Ht.	Wt.	Age
C		(Brazil)	Oliveira, Maique	2.09 m (6 ft 10 in)		32 – 26 June 1993
G		(Brazil)	Carioca, Patrick	1.86 m (6 ft 1 in)		32 – 10 October 1993
G		(Brazil)	Gusmão, Victor	1.88 m (6 ft 2 in)		32 – 3 September 1993
C		(Brazil)	Nunes, Douglas	2.10 m (6 ft 11 in)		39 – 9 February 1987
F		(Brazil)	Paranhos, Alexandre	2.02 m (6 ft 8 in)		34 – 2 March 1992
F		(Brazil)	Vieira, Rômulo	1.98 m (6 ft 6 in)		34 – 27 January 1992
G		(United States)	Gilchrist, Broderick	1.83 m (6 ft 0 in)	80 kg (176 lb)
F		(Brazil)	Oliveira, Gabriel
		(Brazil)	[[|Batata]]

Head coach

- (Brazil) Rinaldo Rodrigues

Assistant coach(es)

- (Brazil) João Henrique dos Santos
- (Brazil) Alexandre Trindade de Lima

Legend

- (C) Team captain
- Injured

- Roster
Updated: 2016-08-25

== Honors ==
=== National ===
- Super Copa Brasil:
  - Runner-up: 2011
