= Mogi das Cruzes Basquete =

- Leagues: NBB; FIBA South American League
- Founded: 1995; 31 years ago
- Arena: Ginásio Municipal Hugo Ramos
- Capacity: 5,000
- Location: Mogi das Cruzes, Brazil
- Team colors: Dark blue, yellow, white
- Main sponsor: Helbor; Tivit
- President: Reiad Abdu Arab
- Head coach: Guerrinha
- Championships: 1 FIBA South American League; 1 Brazilian Super Cup; 2 São Paulo State Championships
- Website: mogidascruzesbasquete.com.br
Home	Away

Mogi das Cruzes Basquete, is a Brazilian professional basketball team that is based in Mogi das Cruzes, São Paulo. The club's full name is Associação Desportiva Mogi das Cruzes. The club competes in the top-tier level national basketball league in Brazil, the Novo Basquete Brasil (NBB).

== History ==
Mogi das Cruzes was founded in 1995, but ended operations in 2005 due to financial problems. In 2011, the club returned to activity governed by an entirely new board. In the same year, the team qualified for the first division of the São Paulo State Championship.

The tradition of basketball in Mogi das Cruzes started when the team played in the finals series of the São Paulo State Championship in 2003, against COC/Ribeirão Preto, which was one of the strongest teams in Brazil at the time. COC/Ribeirão Preto was led by the head coach Lula Ferreira. The series was won by COC/Ribeirão Preto.

In 2012, Mogi das Cruzes finished in third place in the Southeast Super Cup, and thus obtained a spot in the Brazilian Super Cup. The team won the Brazil Super Cup, returning to the top-tier level league of Brazilian basketball, the NBB.

== Roster ==
Note: Flags indicate national team eligibility at FIBA-sanctioned events. Players may hold other non-FIBA nationalities not displayed.

Mogi das Cruzes roster
Players
Coaches

Pos.	No.	Nat.	Name	Ht.	Wt.	Age
PG		(Brazil)	Borges, Alexey	1.81 m (5 ft 11 in)	75 kg (165 lb)	30 – 8 October 1995
PF		(Brazil)	Paranhos, Alexandre	2.04 m (6 ft 8 in)	110 kg (243 lb)	34 – 2 March 1992
SF		(Brazil)	Góes, André	1.95 m (6 ft 5 in)	94 kg (207 lb)	39 – 5 March 1987
G/F		(Brazil)	Fuzaro, Danilo	1.95 m (6 ft 5 in)	90 kg (198 lb)	32 – 10 January 1994
G/F	2	(Brazil)	Colina, Luiz Alberto	1.91 m (6 ft 3 in)	76 kg (168 lb)	25 – 8 December 2000
PG	3	(Brazil)	Ferreira, Vinícius	1.85 m (6 ft 1 in)	69 kg (152 lb)	23 – 24 June 2002
PG	4	(Brazil)	Santana, Lucas	1.80 m (5 ft 11 in)	71 kg (157 lb)	28 – 6 July 1997
G/F	6	(Brazil)	Torralbo, Juan	1.95 m (6 ft 5 in)	90 kg (198 lb)	24 – 2 January 2002
SF	8	(United States)	Stallworth, Shamell	1.96 m (6 ft 5 in)	96 kg (212 lb)	45 – 7 September 1980
F	9	(Brazil)	de Souza, Murilo	1.98 m (6 ft 6 in)	76 kg (168 lb)	23 – 6 June 2002
PF	10	(Brazil)	de Oliveira, Fabricio	2.00 m (6 ft 7 in)	102 kg (225 lb)	40 – 1 May 1985
G/F	11	(Brazil)	Filipin, Guilherme	1.88 m (6 ft 2 in)	92 kg (203 lb)	42 – 7 August 1983
C	16	(Brazil)	Demétrio, João Pedro	2.08 m (6 ft 10 in)	110 kg (243 lb)	30 – 20 May 1995
F/C	19	(Brazil)	Castilho, Anderson	2.00 m (6 ft 7 in)	103 kg (227 lb)	25 – 19 February 2001
F/C	20	(Brazil)	Gruber, Luis Felipe	2.02 m (6 ft 8 in)	98 kg (216 lb)	30 – 16 May 1995
PG	29	(Brazil)	Mattos, André	1.82 m (6 ft 0 in)	72 kg (159 lb)	23 – 2 June 2002
PG	32	(Brazil)	Lessa, Guilherme	1.77 m (5 ft 10 in)	76 kg (168 lb)	30 – 7 May 1995
F	33	(Brazil)	Machado, Breno	1.92 m (6 ft 4 in)	83 kg (183 lb)	24 – 25 May 2001
G	35	(Brazil)	dos Santos, José Carlos	1.99 m (6 ft 6 in)	98 kg (216 lb)	29 – 2 January 1997
F	42	(Brazil)	Cafferata, Enzo	1.88 m (6 ft 2 in)	88 kg (194 lb)	38 – 6 March 1988

Head coach

- (Brazil) Guerrinha

Assistant coach(es)

- (Brazil) Danilo Padovani
- (Brazil) Ricardo Cardoso Guimarães
- (Brazil) Alexandre Alvarez Rios

Legend

- (C) Team captain
- Injured

- Roster
Updated: 11 July 2019

== Honors and titles ==
=== Latin America ===
- FIBA Americas League
  - Runners-up (1): 2018

=== Continental ===
- FIBA South American League
  - Champions (1): (2016)
  - Runners-up (1): 2014

=== National ===
- Brazilian League
  - Runners-up (1): 2018
- Brazilian Super Copa (Brazilian Supercup)
  - Winners (1): 2012

=== Regional ===
- São Paulo State Championship
  - Champions (2): 1996, 2016
  - Runners-up (3): 1998, 2003, 2015

== Head coaches ==
- (Brazil) Jorge "Guerrinha" Guerra
