= São José Basketball =

São José dos Campos Basketball
- Leagues: NBB
- Founded: 1948; 78 years ago
- Arena: Ginásio Lineu de Moura
- Capacity: 2,620
- Location: São José dos Campos, Brazil
- Team colors: Blue, Yellow and White
- President: Rafael Gonçalves Mota
- Head coach: Paulo César Martins de Oliveira
- Championships: 1 Brazilian Championship
Home	Away

São José dos Campos Basketball, or simply Sao José Basketball, is a Brazilian professional basketball club that is based in São José dos Campos, São Paulo State. The club's full name is Associação Esportiva São José dos Campos Basketball. The club plays in the top-tier level league in Brazil, the Novo Basquete Brasil (NBB).

== History ==
In the 1970s and 1980s, São José was one of the greatest basketball teams in Brazil. In 1980 and 1981 the team won the São Paulo State Championship, plus the Brazilian Basketball Cup (Brazilian Championship), in 1981. But for almost thirty years, São José did not win titles.

In 2009, the team won its third São Paulo State Championship, after a finals series against C.A. Paulistano. After all, the point guard Fúlvio de Assis was chosen the best player. In the following year, São José team was defeated in NBB by C.R. Flamengo in the quarterfinal series, by 3–0.

In the same year, Limeira eliminated São José in the São Paulo State Championship, again in the quarterfinals series. In 2011, São José racked up another two defeats, this time in the quarterfinal series of NBB, after a series against Franca, and in the final series of the state championship, won by E.C. Pinheiros. In the 2011–12 NBB season, São José did its best campaign in years, reaching the final of the championship. In previous series, eliminated the executioners Franca and Flamengo, in the quarterfinals and semifinals series, respectively. But in the finals game, São José was defeated by Brasília.

== Roster ==
=== Corrent roster ===
Note: Flags indicate national team eligibility at FIBA-sanctioned events. Players may hold other non-FIBA nationalities not displayed.

São José roster
Players
Coaches

Pos.	No.	Nat.	Name	Ht.	Wt.	Age
PG	3	(Argentina)	Sahdi, Fabián	1.88 m (6 ft 2 in)	92 kg (203 lb)	36 – 24 July 1989
PG	5	(Brazil)	Lima, Hélio	1.87 m (6 ft 2 in)	92 kg (203 lb)	44 – 14 November 1981
PG	6	(Brazil)	Eugeniusz, Matheus	1.89 m (6 ft 2 in)	83 kg (183 lb)	25 – 11 June 2000
SF	8	(Brazil)	Stefanelli, Dedé	1.98 m (6 ft 6 in)	92 kg (203 lb)	41 – 28 August 1984
F	9	(Brazil)	Pastor, Vinicius	2.00 m (6 ft 7 in)	104 kg (229 lb)	35 – 9 September 1990
SF	10	(Brazil)	Panunzio, Christian	1.90 m (6 ft 3 in)	90 kg (198 lb)	31 – 18 October 1994
G	11	(Brazil)	Guirro, João Pedro	1.94 m (6 ft 4 in)	92 kg (203 lb)	26 – 3 December 1999
SF	12	(Brazil)	Lima, Pedro	1.92 m (6 ft 4 in)	94 kg (207 lb)	38 – 8 July 1987
SF	13	(Brazil)	Schneider, Guilherme	1.92 m (6 ft 4 in)	88 kg (194 lb)	39 – 17 October 1986
F	15	(Brazil)	Dornelles, Márcio	1.96 m (6 ft 5 in)	96 kg (212 lb)	50 – 28 December 1975
C	18	(Brazil)	da Conceição, Sérgio	2.08 m (6 ft 10 in)	96 kg (212 lb)	25 – 21 May 2000
F/C	24	(Brazil)	Nunes, Douglas	2.10 m (6 ft 11 in)	106 kg (234 lb)	39 – 9 February 1987
C	41	(Brazil)	Rafel Mineiro	2.13 m (7 ft 0 in)	113 kg (249 lb)	38 – 17 October 1987
C	44	(Brazil)	Coimbra, André Luiz	2.05 m (6 ft 9 in)	110 kg (243 lb)	39 – 29 October 1986

Head coach

- (Brazil) Paulo César Martins de Oliveira

Assistant coach(es)

- (Brazil) Cristiano Ahmed

Legend

- (C) Team captain
- Injured

- Roster
Updated: 4 July 2019

== Honors and titles ==
=== Continental ===
- South American Club Championship
  - Runners-up (1): 1981

=== National ===
- Brazilian Championship:
  - Champions (1): 1981 (I)
  - Runners-up (1): 2012
- Brazilian 2nd Division:
  - Runners-up (1): 2018

=== Regional ===
- São Paulo State Championship
  - Champions (5): 1980, 1981, 2009, 2012, 2015
  - Runners-up (2): 1952, 2011
- Campeonato Paulista A2:
  - Champions (1): 2005

== Other sports ==
Other sports sections at the club include: association football, futsal, martial arts, golf, gymnastics, swimming and tennis, among others.

== See also ==
- São José Esporte Clube
- São José Esporte Clube (women)
