= 2009–10 NBB season =

NBB 2009–10
- League: Novo Basquete Brasil
- Sport: Basketball
- Duration: November 1, 2009–June 6, 2010
- Teams: 14
- TV partner: SporTV Rede Globo

NBB season
- Champions: Brasília
- Season MVP: (Brazil) Marcelinho Machado (Flamengo)

NBB seasons
- ← 2009 2010–11 →

2009–2010 NBB season was the second season of Novo Basquete Brasil, the Brazilian basketball league. It started on November 1, 2009, and was disputed by fourteen teams playing each other in round and runoff in the regular season. At the end of the regular season the first four teams qualify for the quarterfinals of the playoffs automatically now the team who finish between 5th and 12th positions will participate in the first round of the playoffs to define the other four teams in the quarterfinals.

On 7 March 2010, Marcelinho Machado broke two single-game NBB records with 63 points and 16 made three-pointers (on 21 attempts) in a 101–89 win over São José.

== Participating teams ==
- Londrina
- Franca
- Paulistano
- Araraquara
- Assis Basket
- Bauru
- São José
- Pinheiros
- Flamengo
- Saldanha da Gama
- CETAF Vila Velha
- Brasília
- Joinville
- Minas

== Regular season ==
Classification
Team		Pts	G	W	D	%
1	Brasília	47	26	21	5	80,76
2	Flamengo	46	26	20	6	76,92
3	Franca	43	26	17	9	65,38
4	Minas	43	26	17	9	65,38
5	Joinville	41	26	15	11	57,69
6	Pinheiros	40	26	14	12	53,84
7	São José	39	26	13	13	50,0
8	Bauru	38	26	12	14	46,15
9	Assis	37	26	11	15	42,30
10	Palmeiras/Araraquara	36	26	10	16	38,46
11	Paulistano	36	26	10	16	38,46
12	Vila Velha	34	26	8	18	30,76
13	Londrina	34	26	8	18	30,76
14	Saldanha da Gama	32	26	6	20	23,07
Pts – points; G – games disputed; W - wins; D - defeats; % - percentage of victories;

Classification

Qualified for the playoffs automatically

Rated qualifying for the first round of the playoffs

== Playoffs - first round ==
First round
5	Joinville	68	93	71	–	–	3
12	Vila Velha	64	74	60	–	–	0
6	Pinheiros	101	94	74	–	–	3
11	Paulistano	93	92	73	–	–	0
7	São José	78	88	71	82	–	3
10	Palmeiras/Araraquara	82	74	67	70	–	1
8	Bauru	77	90	86	–	–	3
9	Assis	70	68	81	–	–	0

=== Joinville (5) vs. (12) Araraquara ===
==== Game 1 ====
Sportv

April 7, 2010
16:00 UTC-03

Vila Velha 64, Joinville 68
Pts: Cícero Gonzaga 15; Rebs: Tramaine Stevens 7 Asts: Tramaine Stevens, Manuil Egidio 3	Pts: Tiagão 17; Rebs: Vinícius Bristott, André Góes 8 Asts: Espiga 3
Joinville led series, 1–0

Ginásio Municipal João Goulart (Tartarugão), Vila Velha, Espírito Santo

==== Game 2 ====
Sportv

April 9, 2010
20:00 UTC-03

Joinville 93, Vila Velha 74
Pts: André Góes 22; Rebs: Shilton dos Santos 8 Asts: Espiga 4	Pts: Alexandre Pinheiro 19; Rebs: Manuil Egidio 7 Asts: Alexandre Pinheiro, Raul 2
Joinville led series, 2–0

Centreventos Cau Hansen, Joinville, Santa Catarina

==== Game 3 ====
Sportv

April 10, 2010
20:00 UTC-03

Joinville 71, Vila Velha 60
Pts: André Góes 16; Rebs: Shilton dos Santos, Tiagão 8 Asts: three players tied 3	Pts: Tramaine Stevens 13; Rebs: Eric Soares, Magen McNeil 4 Asts: Alexandre Pinheiro 3
Joinville wins series, 3–0

Centreventos Cau Hansen, Joinville, Santa Catarina

=== Pinheiros (6) vs. (11) Paulistano ===
==== Game 1 ====
Sportv

April 9, 2010
19:00 UTC-03

Paulistano 91, Pinheiros 103
Pts: Paulinho Boracini 27; Rebs: Felipe Ribeiro 8 Asts: Paulinho Boracini, Fernando Penna 4	Pts: Shamell Stallworth 31; Rebs: Morro 10; Asts: Jamison Brewer 10
Pinheiros led series, 1–0

Ginásio Antônio Prado Junior, São Paulo, São Paulo

==== Game 2 ====
Sportv

April 12, 2010
20:00 UTC-03

Pinheiros 94, Paulistano 92
Pts: Diego Pinheiro 24; Rebs: Olivinha 16; Asts: Shamell Stallworth, Jamison Brewer 7	Pts: Paulinho Boracini 20; Rebs: Betinho Duarte 5 Asts: Paulinho Boracini, Fernando Penna 3
Pinheiros led series, 2–0

Ginásio Henrique Villaboim, São Paulo, São Paulo

==== Game 3 ====
Sportv

April 13, 2010
16:00 UTC-03

Pinheiros 87, Paulistano 84
Pts: Olivinha 25; Rebs: Olivinha 20; Asts: Jamison Brewer 4	Pts: Paulinho Boracini 23; Rebs: Felipe Ribeiro 8 Asts: Fernando Penna 3
Pinheiros wins series, 3–0

Ginásio Henrique Villaboim, São Paulo, São Paulo

=== São José (7) vs. (10) Araraquara ===
==== Game 1 ====
Sportv

April 8, 2010
20:00 UTC-03

Araraquara 82, São José 78
Pts: Jonathan Luz, Arnaldinho 17; Rebs: Deivisson Costa 8 Asts: Arnaldinho 5	Pts: Fúlvio de Assis 23; Rebs: Paulo de Castro, Fabrício de Oliveira 7 Asts: Matheus Costa 6
Araraquara led series, 1–0

Ginásio Castelo Branco (Gigantão), Araraquara, São Paulo

==== Game 2 ====
Sportv

April 11, 2010
11:00 UTC-03

São José 88, Araraquara 74
Pts: Fabrício de Oliveira 22; Rebs: Fabrício de Oliveira, Rafael Mineiro 7 Asts: Fúlvio de Assis 15	Pts: Arnaldinho 21; Rebs: Deivisson Costa, Jonathan Luz 7 Asts: three players tied 4
Series tied, 1-1

Ginásio Lineu de Moura, São José dos Campos, São Paulo

==== Game 3 ====
Sportv

April 12, 2010
19:00 UTC-03

São José 71, Araraquara 67
Pts: Fabrício de Oliveira, Matheus Costa 18; Rebs: Wanderson Trigueiro 6 Asts: Fúlvio de Assis 10	Pts: Arnaldinho 18; Rebs: Marcão 9 Asts: Arnaldinho 6
São José led series, 2–1

Ginásio Lineu de Moura, São José dos Campos, São Paulo

==== Game 4 ====
Sportv

April 16, 2010
19:00 UTC-03

Araraquara 70, São José 82
Pts: Deivisson Costa 19; Rebs: Deivisson Costa 10; Asts: Arlindo Neto, Luisinho 4	Pts: Wanderson Trigueiro 21; Rebs: Wanderson Trigueiro 8 Asts: Fúlvio de Assis 13
São José wins series, 3-1

Ginásio Castelo Branco (Gigantão), Araraquara, São Paulo

=== Bauru (8) vs. (9) Assis ===
==== Game 1 ====
Sportv

April 8, 2010
20:00 UTC-03

Assis 70, Bauru 77
Pts: James Parker 20; Rebs: Lucas Tischer 10; Asts: Mark Borders 5	Pts: Larry Taylor 20; Rebs: Jeff Agba 8 Asts: Larry Taylor 3
Bauru led series, 1-0

Jairo Ferreira dos Santos (Jairão), Assis, São Paulo

==== Game 2 ====
Sportv

April 11, 2010
11:00 UTC-03

Bauru 90, Assis 68
Pts: Larry Taylor 28; Rebs: Ricardo Azevedo 10; Asts: three players tied 3	Pts: James Parker 17; Rebs: Leandro Buboltz, James Parker 8 Asts: Leandro Buboltz 2
Bauru led series, 2-0

Ginásio Panela de Pressão, Bauru, São Paulo

==== Game 3 ====
Sportv

April 12, 2010
20:00 UTC-03

Bauru 86, Assis 81
Pts: Fernando Fischer 21; Rebs: Jeff Agba 11; Asts: Larry Taylor 6	Pts: Mark Borders, John Thomas 18; Rebs: John Thomas 10; Asts: Mark Borders 5
Bauru wins series, 3-0

Ginásio Panela de Pressão, Bauru, São Paulo

== Playoffs ==
Quarterfinals
1	Brasília	102	118	111	-	-	3
8	Bauru	96	78	101	-	-	0
4	Minas	76	87	94	-	-	3
5	Joinville	72	77	90	-	-	0
3	Franca	95	84	73	-	-	3
6	Pinheiros	76	75	71	-	-	0
2	Flamengo	78	89	95	-	-	3
7	São José	71	70	91	-	-	0

Semifinals
1	Brasília	106	94	102	70	90	3
4	Minas	97	103	86	78	77	2
3	Franca	90	73	73	85	-	1
2	Flamengo	82	101	80	86	-	3

Finals
1	Brasília	84	93	85	74	76	3
2	Flamengo	88	90	84	94	74	2

== Quarterfinals ==
=== Brasília (1) vs. (8) Bauru ===
==== Game 1 ====
Sportv

April 20, 2010
19:00 UTC-03

Bauru 96, Brasília 102
Pts: Larry Taylor 36; Rebs: Jeff Agba 11; Asts: Larry Taylor 4	Pts: Guilherme Giovannoni 26; Rebs: Guilherme Giovannoni 12; Asts: Valter da Silva 3
Brasília led series, 1–0

Ginásio Panela de Pressão, Bauru, São Paulo

==== Game 2 ====
Sportv

April 23, 2010
19:00 UTC-03

Brasília 118, Bauru 78
Pts: Arthur Belchor Silva 22; Rebs: Mineiro 7 Asts: Nezinho dos Santos, Valter da Silva 5	Pts: Fernando Fischer 31; Rebs: Fernando Fischer, Jeff Agba 6 Asts: Larry Taylor 5
Brasília led series, 2–0

Ginásio Nilson Nelson, Brasília, Distrito Federal

==== Game 3 ====
Sportv

April 24, 2010
21:30 UTC-03

Brasília 111, Bauru 101
Pts: Arthur Belchor Silva 28; Rebs: Guilherme Giovannoni 9 Asts: Valter da Silva 6	Pts: Larry Taylor 30; Rebs: Larry Taylor 7 Asts: Larry Taylor 7
Brasília wins series, 3–0

Ginásio Nilson Nelson, Brasília, Distrito Federal

=== Flamengo (2) vs. (7) São José ===
==== Game 1 ====
Sportv

April 23, 2010
21:00 UTC-03

São José 71, Flamengo 78
Pts: Matheus Costa 21; Rebs: Fúlvio de Assis 7 Asts: Fúlvio de Assis 14	Pts: Marcelinho Machado 35; Rebs: Jefferson William 8 Asts: Fred Santos 8
Flamengo led series, 1–0

Ginásio Lineu de Moura, São José dos Campos, São Paulo

==== Game 2 ====
Sportv

April 25, 2010
20:30 UTC-03

Flamengo 89, São José 70
Pts: Marcelinho Machado 19; Rebs: Marcelinho Machado, Jefferson William 8 Asts: Duda Machado 4	Pts: Wanderson Trigueiro 18; Rebs: Fúlvio de Assis 7 Asts: Matheus Costa, Rafael Mineiro 3
Flamengo led series, 2–0

HSBC Arena, Rio de Janeiro, Rio de Janeiro

==== Game 3 ====
Sportv

April 26, 2010
19:00 UTC-03

Flamengo 95, São José 91
Pts: Marcelinho Machado 35; Rebs: Marcelinho Machado 16; Asts: Hélio Lima, Marcelinho Machado 3	Pts: Fúlvio de Assis 30; Rebs: Rafael Mineiro 9 Asts: Fúlvio de Assis, Matheus Costa 5
Flamengo wins series, 3–0

HSBC Arena, Rio de Janeiro, Rio de Janeiro

=== Franca (3) vs. (6) Pinheiros ===
==== Game 1 ====
Sportv

April 21, 2010
15:00 UTC-03

Pinheiros 76, Franca 95
Pts: Shamell Stallworth 26; Rebs: Diego Pinheiro 6 Asts: Jamison Brewer 4	Pts: Hélio Rubens Filho 23; Rebs: Ricardo Probst 9 Asts: Hélio Rubens Filho 7
Franca led series, 1–0

Ginásio Henrique Villaboim, São Paulo, São Paulo

==== Game 2 ====
Sportv

April 24, 2010
11:00 UTC-03

Franca 84, Pinheiros 75
Pts: Rogério Klafke 24; Rebs: Ricardo Probst 8 Asts: Hélio Rubens Filho 11	Pts: Olivinha 20; Rebs: Olivinha 13; Asts: Jamison Brewer 6
Franca led series, 2–0

Ginásio Pedrocão, Franca, São Paulo

==== Game 3 ====
Sportv

April 25, 2010
12:00 UTC-03

Franca 73, Pinheiros 71
Pts: Márcio Dornelles 21; Rebs: Harper Williams 14; Asts: Helio Rubens Filho 9	Pts: Shamell Stallworth 24; Rebs: Olivinha 8 Asts: Shamell Stallworth 5
Franca wins series, 3–0

Ginásio Pedrocão, Franca, São Paulo

=== Minas (4) vs. (5) Joinville ===
==== Game 1 ====
Sportv

April 21, 2010
17:00 UTC-03

Joinville 72, Minas 76
Pts: Audrei Parizotto 17; Rebs: Shilton dos Santos 11; Asts: Espiga 5	Pts: William Drudi 20; Rebs: Murilo Becker 9 Asts: Facundo Sucatzky 10
Minas led series, 1–0

Centreventos Cau Hansen, Joinville, Santa Catarina

==== Game 2 ====
Sportv

April 23, 2010
20:00 UTC-03

Minas 84, Joinville 75
Pts: Leandro Azevedo 18; Rebs: Murilo Becker 9 Asts: Facundo Sucatzky 9	Pts: André Góes, Audrei Parizotto 15; Rebs: Audrei Parizotto 12; Asts: Espiga 3
Minas led series, 2–0

Arena Vivo, Belo Horizonte, Minas Gerais

==== Game 3 ====
Sportv

April 24, 2010
19:30 UTC-03

Minas 94, Joinville 90
Pts: Christopher Jeffries 27; Rebs: Murilo Becker 10; Asts: Facundo Sucatzky 7	Pts: Shilton dos Santos 23; Rebs: Shilton dos Santos 11; Asts: four played tied 2
Minas wins series, 3–0

Arena Vivo, Belo Horizonte, Minas Gerais

== Semifinals ==
=== Brasília (1) vs. (4) Minas ===
==== Game 1 ====
Sportv

May 4, 2010
18:00 UTC-03

Minas 97, Brasília 106
Pts: Murilo Becker 26; Rebs: Murilo Becker 12; Asts: Facundo Sucatzky 11	Pts: Nezinho dos Santos 26; Rebs: three players tied 7 Asts: Valter da Silva, Alex Garcia 6
Brasília led series, 1–0

Arena Vivo, Belo Horizonte, Minas Gerais

==== Game 2 ====
Sportv

May 7, 2010
18:30 UTC-03

Brasília 94, Minas 103
Pts: Arthur Belchor Silva 28; Rebs: Arthur Belchor Silva 6 Asts: Alex Garcia 6	Pts: Murilo Becker 29; Rebs: Murilo Becker 15; Asts: Luiz Felipe Lemes 10
Series tied, 1–1

Ginásio Nilson Nelson, Brasília, Distrito Federal

==== Game 3 ====
Sportv

May 8, 2010
18:30 UTC-03

Brasília 102, Minas 96
Pts: Guilherme Giovannoni 21; Rebs: Guilherme Giovannoni 10; Asts: Valter da Silva 7	Pts: Luiz Felipe Lemes 24; Rebs: William Drudi 10; Asts: Luiz Felipe Lemes 8
Brasília led series, 2–1

Ginásio Nilson Nelson, Brasília, Distrito Federal

==== Game 4 ====
Sportv

May 13, 2010
19:00 UTC-03

Minas 78, Brasília 70
Pts: Murilo Becker 21; Rebs: Christopher Jeffries 7 Asts: Luiz Felipe Lemes 6	Pts: Alex Garcia 18; Rebs: Guilherme Giovannoni 8 Asts: Valter da Silva 5
Series tied, 2–2

Arena Vivo, Belo Horizonte, Minas Gerais

==== Game 5 ====
Sportv

May 15, 2010
16:00 UTC-03

Brasília 90, Minas 77
Pts: Alex Garcia 23; Rebs: Guilherme Giovannoni 10; Asts: Valter da Silva 5	Pts: Luiz Felipe Lemes 22; Rebs: Leandro Azevedo 9 Asts: three players tied 2
Brasília wins series, 3–2

Ginásio Nilson Nelson, Brasília, Distrito Federal

=== Flamengo (2) vs. (3) Franca ===
==== Game 1 ====
Sportv

May 4, 2010
21:00 UTC-03

Franca 90, Flamengo 82
Pts: Márcio Dornelles 22; Rebs: Ricardo Probst 12; Asts: Hélio Rubens Filho 5	Pts: Marcelinho Machado 28; Rebs: Fernando Coloneze 8 Asts: Marcelinho Machado 4
Franca led series, 1–0

Ginásio Pedrocão, Franca, São Paulo

==== Game 2 ====
Sportv

May 7, 2010
21:00 UTC-03

Flamengo 101, Franca 73
Pts: Marcelinho Machado 23; Rebs: Marcelinho Machado, Hélio Lima 8 Asts: Marcelinho Machado 7	Pts: Márcio Dornelles 26; Rebs: Harper Williams 7 Asts: Tony Stockman, Hélio Rubens Filho 4
Series tied, 1–1

HSBC Arena, Rio de Janeiro, Rio de Janeiro

==== Game 3 ====
Sportv

May 8, 2010
20:30 UTC-03

Flamengo 80, Franca 73
Pts: Marcelinho Machado 23; Rebs: Jefferson William 11; Asts: Duda Machado 5	Pts: Hélio Rubens Filho 19; Rebs: Ricardo Probst 11; Asts: Hélio Rubens Filho 3
Flamengo led series, 2–1

HSBC Arena, Rio de Janeiro, Rio de Janeiro

==== Game 4 ====
Sportv

May 11, 2010
20:30 UTC-03

Franca 85, Flamengo 86
Pts: Hélio Rubens Filho 21; Rebs: Ricardo Probst 13; Asts: Tony Stockman 3	Pts: Marcelinho Machado 21; Rebs: Jefferson William 5 Asts: Hélio Lima 4
Flamengo wins series, 3–1

Ginásio Pedrocão, Franca, São Paulo

== Finals ==
=== Brasília (1) vs. (2) Flamengo ===
==== Game 1 ====
Sportv

May 22, 2010
16:00 UTC-03

Flamengo 88, Brasília 84
Pts: Hélio Lima 27; Rebs: Guilherme Teichmann 7 Asts: Hélio Lima 6	Pts: Guilherme Giovannoni 21; Rebs: Estevam Ferreira, Guilherme Giovannoni 9 Asts: Nezinho dos Santos 5
Flamengo led series, 1–0

HSBC Arena, Rio de Janeiro, Rio de Janeiro

==== Game 2 ====
Sportv

May 28, 2010
21:00 UTC-03

Brasília 93, Flamengo 90
Pts: Guilherme Giovannoni 19; Rebs: Estevam Ferreira 14; Asts: Guilherme Giovannoni 7	Pts: Marcelinho Machado 41; Rebs: Guilherme Teichmann 7 Asts: Duda Machado 5
Series tied, 1–1

Ginásio Nilson Nelson, Brasília, Distrito Federal

==== Game 3 ====
Sportv

May 30, 2010
12:00 UTC-03

Brasília 85, Flamengo 84
Pts: Alex Garcia 17; Rebs: Alex Garcia 13; Asts: Nezinhos dos Santos, Valter da Silva 5	Pts: Duda Machado 22; Rebs: Guilherme Teichmann 9 Asts: Marcelinho Machado 4
Brasília led series, 2–1

Ginásio Nilson Nelson, Brasília, Distrito Federal

==== Game 4 ====
Sportv

June 3, 2010
16:00 UTC-03

Flamengo 94, Brasília 74
Pts: Duda Machado 20; Rebs: Wagner Mattos 7 Asts: Duda Machado 9	Pts: Guilherme Giovannoni 18; Rebs: Márcio Cipriano, Valter da Silva 7 Asts: Nezinho dos Santos, Valter da Silva 3
Series tied, 2–2

HSBC Arena, Rio de Janeiro, Rio de Janeiro

==== Game 5 ====
Sportv

June 6, 2010
10:00 UTC-03

Brasília 76, Flamengo 74
Pts: Alex Garcia 23; Rebs: Guilherme Giovannoni, Valter da Silva 7 Asts: Alex Garcia 6	Pts: Duda Machado, Marcelinho Machado 16; Rebs: Guilherme Teichmann 11; Asts: Hélio Lima 4
Brasília wins NBB Finals, 3–2

Ginásio Newton de Faria, Anápolis, Goiás

== Awards ==
- MVP - Marcelinho Machado (Flamengo)
- Sixth Player - Nezinho dos Santos (Brasília)
- Best Defender - Alex Garcia (Brasília)
- Revelation - Raulzinho (Minas)
- Most Improved Player - Audrei Parizotto (Joinville)
- Coach - Lula Ferreira (Brasília)

== All-Team ==
Position	Player	Team
PG	Fúlvio de Assis	São José
SG	Alex Garcia	Brasília
SF	Marcelinho Machado	Flamengo
PF	Guilherme Giovannoni	Brasília
C	Murilo Becker	Minas
