= Fúlvio de Assis =

Brazilian-Italian basketball player

Personal information
- Born: 15 August 1981 (age 45) São Paulo, Brazil
- Listed height: 6 ft 2 in (1.88 m)
- Listed weight: 185 lb (84 kg)

Career information
- Playing career: 1999–2022
- Position: Point guard

Career history
- 1999–2000: Uberlândia
- 2000: Paulistano
- 2000–2001: Leitor Casa Branca
- 2001–2002: Franca
- 2002–2004: Corinthians
- 2005: Ribeirão Preto
- 2006: Assis Basket
- 2007: Paulista
- 2008–2009: Pallacanestro Roseto
- 2009: CB Granada
- 2009–2014: São José
- 2014–2017: Brasília
- 2017–2018: Vasco da Gama
- 2018–2019: Bauru
- 2019–2022: Mogi das Cruzes

Career highlights
- 4× All-NBB Team (2010, 2012, 2013, 2017); 3× NBB All-Star Game (2010, 2012, 2013)
Medals
Men's basketball
Representing Brazil
FIBA South American Championship
Silver medal – second place	2004 Rio de Janeiro
Gold medal – first place	2010 Neiva

Fúlvio Chiantia de Assis (born 15 August 1981) is a Brazilian-Italian former professional basketball player. He played at the point guard (play maker) position.

== Professional career ==
De Assis has played professional basketball in Brazil, Italy, and Spain and has represented Brazil's national basketball team on several occasions. During his time with São José, he became a fan favourite.

== National team career ==
De Assis has been a member of the senior Brazilian national basketball team. He played at the 2017 FIBA AmeriCup.

== Novo Basquete Brasil statistics ==
Legend
GP	Games played	GS	Games started	MPG	Minutes per game
FG%	Field goal percentage	3P%	3-point field goal percentage	FT%	Free throw percentage
RPG	Rebounds per game	APG	Assists per game	SPG	Steals per game
BPG	Blocks per game	PPG	Points per game	**Bold**	Career high

Led the league

=== Regular season ===
Season	Team	GP	MPG	FG%	3PT%	FT%	RPG	APG	SPG	BPG	PPG
2009–10	São José	26	**34.5**	.458	.379	.849	**4.1**	7.8	**1.9**	.0	**13.8**
2010–11	São José	19	30.9	**.570**	.427	**.914**	3.3	7.3	1.4	.1	13.1
2011–12	São José	22	31.6	.526	.427	.857	3.7	**8.3**	1.4	.0	11.0
2012–13	São José	**30**	30.4	.517	**.438**	.902	3.6	7.9	1.4	.0	11.6
2013–14	São José	-	-	-	-	-	-	-	-	-	-
Career		97	31.8	.509	.418	.880	3.7	7.8	1.5	.0	12.4
All-Star		3	–	–	–	–	–	–	–	–	-

=== Playoffs ===
Season	Team	GP	MPG	FG%	3PT%	FT%	RPG	APG	SPG	BPG	PPG
2010	São José	7	**38.5**	.490	.366	.939	5.7	**8.9**	.6	.3	**14.6**
2011	São José	8	32.3	.503	.353	**.949**	2.8	6.5	**1.3**	.1	11.1
2012	São José	9	32.2	**.524**	.413	.842	3.1	7.3	1.2	.1	14.3
2013	São José	**14**	31.2	.481	**.417**	.814	5.5	6.7	1.1	.1	12.4
2014	São José	-	-	-	-	-	-	-	-	-	-
Career		38	33.5	.497	.362	.886	4.3	7.4	1.1	.2	13.1

== Achievements and awards ==
=== Individual ===
- 4× All-NBB Team: (2010, 2012, 2013, 2017)
- 3× NBB All-Star Game: (2010, 2012, 2013)
