= 2012–13 NBB season =

NBB 2012–13
- League: Novo Basquete Brasil
- Sport: Basketball
- Duration: November 2012–May 2013
- Teams: 18
- TV partner: SporTV Rede Globo

NBB season
- Champions: Flamengo
- Season MVP: (Brazil) Marquinhos (Flamengo)

NBB seasons
- ← 2011–12 2013–14 →

The 2012–13 NBB season was the fifth edition of Novo Basquete Brasil, the Brazilian basketball league. This tournament is organized entirely by the Liga Nacional de Basquete (LNB). The NBB serves as a qualifying competition for international tournaments such as Liga Sudamericana and Torneo InterLigas. For this season the qualify for the FIBA Americas League came to be through the Liga Sudamericana.

This season has a record number of participating teams, with eighteen teams playing each other in round and second round in the regular season. At the end of two rounds the top four teams qualify for the quarterfinals of the playoffs automatically, while the teams finishing in the 5th and 12th place participated in the first round of the playoffs to determine the other four teams in the quarterfinals, best of five matches, advances to the next phase who win three games.

For this season, the LNB added a new feature: the last two regular season placed will dispute a four-group against the two finalists in the Super Copa Brasil de Basquete. The two top finishers in this group receive the right to contest the next NBB.

== Participating teams ==
Team	Home city	Stadium	Capacity	Head coach	Season
Sky/Basquete Cearense	Fortaleza	Ginásio Paulo Sarasate	9,000	(Brazil) Alberto Bial	1st
Paschoalotto/Bauru	Bauru	Ginásio Panela de Pressão	3,000	(Brazil) Guerrinha	5th
UniCEUB/BRB/Brasília	Brasília	Ginásio da ASCEB; Ginásio Nilson Nelson	3,050; 16,000	(Brazil) José Carlos Vidal	5th
Flamengo	Rio de Janeiro	Ginásio Álvaro Vieira Lima	4,500	(Brazil) José Alves Neto	5th
Vivo/Franca	Franca	Ginásio Pedrocão	6,000	(Brazil) Lula Ferreira	5th
Cia do Terno/Romaço/Joinville	Joinville	Centreventos Cau Hansen	4,000	(Brazil) Ênio Vecchi	5th
Liga Sorocabana	Sorocaba	Ginásio Gualberto Moreira	3,000	(Brazil) Rinaldo Rodrigues	2nd
Winner/Kabum/Limeira	Limeira	Ginásio Vô Lucato	1,800	(Brazil) Demétrius Ferracciú	4th
Icatu/Minas	Belo Horizonte	Arena Vivo	4,000	(Brazil) Raul Togni Filho	5th
Mogi das Cruzes/Helbor	Mogi das Cruzes	Ginásio Municipal Professor Hugo Ramos	5,000	(Spain) Paco García	1st
Palmeiras	São Paulo	Ginásio Palestra Itália	1,500	(Spain) Arturo Álvarez	1st
Paulistano/Unimed	São Paulo	Ginásio Antônio Prado Junior	1,500	(Brazil) Gustavo de Conti	5th
Pinheiros/Sky	São Paulo	Poliesportivo Henrique Villaboim	854	(Brazil) Cláudio Mortari	5th
São José/Unimed	São José dos Campos	Ginásio Lineu de Moura	2,620	(Brazil) Régis Marrelli	5th
Suzano/Cesumar/Campestre	Suzano	Ginásio Paulo Portela	1,500	(Brazil) Cadum	1st
Tijuca/Rio de Janeiro	Rio de Janeiro	Ginásio Álvaro Vieira Lima	4,500	(Brazil) Eldio Leal	2nd
Unitri/Universo/Uberlândia	Uberlândia	Ginásio Homero Santos	3,500	(Brazil) Hélio Rubens Garcia	3rd
Vila Velha/Garoto/UVV	Vila Velha	Ginásio Municipal João Goulart	3,500	(Brazil) Daniel Wattfy	5th

== Managerial changes ==
Team	Outgoing manager	Manner of departure	Replaced by	Date of appointment
Tijuca	(Brazil) Miguel Ângelo da Luz	Sacked	(Brazil) Elídio Leal	March 13, 2013

== Regular season ==
=== League table ===
#	Teams	P	W	L	PF	PA	Avg	PCT	Pts	Qualification or relegation
1	Flamengo	34	30	4	3088	2585	1,20	88%	64	Qualified for the Quarterfinals Playoffs
2	Brasília	34	27	7	3037	2712	1,12	79%	61	Qualified for the Quarterfinals Playoffs
3	Uberlândia	34	25	9	2855	2631	1,09	73%	59	Qualified for the Quarterfinals Playoffs
4	Bauru	34	24	10	2817	2608	1,08	70%	58	Qualified for the Quarterfinals Playoffs
5	Franca	34	23	11	2673	2422	1,10	67%	57	Qualified for the First Round Playoffs
6	Pinheiros	34	22	12	2941	2825	1,04	64%	56	Qualified for the First Round Playoffs
7	São José	34	20	14	2721	2653	1,03	58%	54	Qualified for the First Round Playoffs
8	Basquete Cearense	34	18	16	2727	2721	1,00	52%	52	Qualified for the First Round Playoffs
9	Paulistano	34	17	17	2740	2745	1,00	50%	51	Qualified for the First Round Playoffs
10	Minas	34	16	18	2750	2779	0,99	47%	50	Qualified for the First Round Playoffs
11	Limeira	34	15	19	2748	2691	1,02	44%	49	Qualified for the First Round Playoffs
12	Liga Sorocabana	34	15	19	2640	2746	0,96	44%	49	Qualified for the First Round Playoffs
13	Palmeiras	34	12	22	2562	2742	0,93	35%	46	
14	Mogi das Cruzes	34	11	23	2546	2796	0,91	32%	45	
15	Joinville	34	11	23	2579	2739	0,94	32%	45	
16	Vila Velha	34	10	24	2690	2899	0,93	29%	44	
17	Tijuca	34	6	28	2447	2706	0,90	17%	40	Relegation to Promotion Tournament
18	Suzano	34	4	30	2497	3064	0,82	11%	38	Relegation to Promotion Tournament

Source: LNB – NBB

=== Results ===
	BCE	BAU	BRA	FLA	FRA	JOI	LSB	LIM	MIN	MOG	PAL	PAU	PIN	SJO	SUZ	TIJ	UBE	VIV
Basquete Cearense		83–82	100–104	82–101	87–88	78–62	71–62	65–84	88–52	71–74	85–83	95–76	84–85	73–63	96–61	92–86	60–72	77–75
Bauru	95–84		79–90	97–102	67–74	114–91	85–94	83–82	91–59	87–84	91–67	66–64	67–62	87–82	85–44	81–68	81–82	85–70
Brasília	92–77	80–60		82–70	93–77	94–83	86–75	97–89	81–86	94–67	99–81	68–67	96–99	90–57	94–82	90–79	102–80	102–76
Flamengo	86–61	74–89	102–88		86–91	94–67	102–64	98–81	90–77	70–64	81–61	94–70	102–85	83–75	89–56	107–103	79–66	96–77
Franca	90–68	80–82	62–76	77–82		70–52	85–64	75–62	78–77	79–71	82–61	77–63	72–67	76–53	108–66	101–75	73–75	96–86
Joinville	94–71	71–83	86–96	72–99	50–59		86–93	77–62	73–55	85–90	75–60	63–71	73–93	79–93	79–67	74–73	71–62	99–80
Liga Sorocabana	76–86	76–90	70–100	59–87	59–80	93–86		81–79	82–84	81–74	93–73	73–78	81–87	66–65	87–70	72–67	74–63	82–76
Limeira	90–72	82–84	77–80	75–80	72–58	96–86	85–66		85–87	71–79	75–65	89–68	82–81	79–83	96–65	91–75	77–87	88–87
Minas	76–74	64–77	86–90	90–105	58–60	78–69	78–76	81–61		84–86	89–77	109–114	101–75	97–77	100–78	77–70	67–90	95–72
Mogi das Cruzes	80–86	73–80	91–96	64–86	59–95	68–70	71–59	72–89	75–66		78–75	77–73	76–95	60–93	86–65	68–83	83–81	76–85
Palmeiras	81–86	89–83	78–88	61–106	87–77	92–86	85–77	72–68	96–87	86–77		79–86	85–94	75–66	95–86	77–79	112–104	87–65
Paulistano	79–86	76–73	77–82	93–94	51–77	95–71	94–96	86–82	92–78	67–77	83–69		89–88	80–68	84–72	84–65	76–88	80–90
Pinheiros	87–69	73–74	92–89	93–91	97–82	88–87	77–94	102–100	91–77	118–82	87–82	88–86		77–82	91–65	84–81	87–92	92–90
São José	76–87	62–82	84–79	82–84	87–66	83–76	77–73	84–76	95–93	105–67	77–65	68–76	93–77		89–74	81–65	80–76	106–87
Suzano	71–85	82–87	81–92	74–105	75–71	65–75	79–90	80–81	76–97	78–77	79–87	85–87	72–91	80–100		86–79	67–89	88–94
Tijuca	69–83	71–79	53–73	70–94	59–63	58–79	68–89	77–82	65–75	76–67	82–79	52–74	64–73	74–79	103–66		63–83	82–74
Uberlândia	84–71	94–83	95–89	78–87	91–87	99–73	84–81	86–96	88–86	75–68	89–73	86–75	91–87	88–63	109–73	71–57		73–64
Vila Velha	85–94	79–88	94–85	61–82	64–87	67–59	88–82	72–64	82–84	92–85	68–59	120–126	74–78	86–93	86–89	58–56	66–84	

Source: NBB Fixtures

== NBB All-Star Weekend ==
This season, the All-Star Weekend will be played in Ginásio Nilson Nelson in Brasília on March 1–2, 2013. In the first day of the event, it will be disputed the "Dunk Tournament", "Three-Point Tournament" and "Skills Challenge". In these three tournaments, the champions in the previous season are already included, while the other participating players will compete for the remaining spots. The players of Brasília, the host team, are also included at these tournaments.

In the second day, it will occur the main event on the weekend, the NBB All-Star Game, which will be disputed by two teams divided into "NBB Brasil", formed by Brazilian players, and "NBB Mundo", formed by foreign players. On February 6, the Liga Nacional de Basquete (LNB) announced the players that will make up the teams NBB Brasil and NBB Mundo, which will compete in the fifth edition of the All-Star Game of the national competition. In all, 85 votes were counted. Different professionals who participated in the election had assigned different weights. The coaches of the 18 teams vying for the NBB accounted for 50%, the captains of the teams were left with 20%, while the specialist press and the personalities of basketball had 30% weight. The starter players will be chosen by votes on the internet.

=== Dunk Tournament ===
For Dunk Tournament, the champion in the previous season was the shooting guard Gui Deodato, from Bauru, while the host team, Brasília, will be represented by the shooting guard Isaac Gonçalves. The other challengers to the title was defined after being evaluated by a jury of personalities from the artistic and basketball. The judges evaluated each participant a dunk and choose two athletes (Danilo Fuzaro and Jefferson Socas). The fifth element (Desmond Holloway) was set after a popular vote on the Internet. The two finalists were the champion of the previous season Gui Deodato and the shooting guard Danilo Fuzaro. Using the cover of the character Batman and a mask of the famous villain Darth Vader, Gui Deodato won the tournament.

Player	First round	Finals
Gui Deodato (Bauru)	50+49=99	50+46=96
Danilo Fuzaro (Minas)	50+49=99	31+50=81
Isaac (Brasília)	47+44=91	
Desmond Holloway (Liga Sorocabana)	42+42=84	
Jefferson Socas (Franca)	46+37=83	

=== Three-Point Tournament ===
The tournament will have six competitors for the title. The champion of previous season Helinho, from Uberlândia, and Rossi, from the host city team, had already been secured in the dispute and its four rivals was decided after the completion of qualifying, which was played between matches of the NBB on February 14 and February 16. In the final, which featured Matheus Dalla, from Limeira, and Matheus Costa, from Basquete Cearense, it was necessary two tiebreaks to know the champion. In the second tiebreak Matheus Dalla won his first Three-Point Tournament.

Player	First round	Finals	Tiebreak
Matheus Dalla (Limeira)	21	19	17/19
Matheus Costa (Basquete Cearense)	18	19	17/13
Guto (Palmeiras)	17		
Rossi (Brasília)	16		
Bruno Irigoyen (Minas)	16		
Helinho (Uberlândia)	15		

=== Skills Challenge ===
The Skills Challenge, which will be played for the third time, will have the presence of double champion Fernando Penna, from Pinheiros, the guard Eric Tatu, from the host team Brasília, and six more competitors which was determined by the LNB Technical Department. In the final, Fernando Penna, for the third consecutive time, won the challenge, against the point guard Gustavinho, Mogi das Cruzes.

Player	First round	Finals
Fernando Penna (Pinheiros)	24.8	23.4
Gustavinho (Mogi das Cruzes)	26.5	35.3
Kenny Dawkins (Liga Sorocabana)	26.7	
Marcellus (Tijuca)	26.8	
Fúlvio (São José)	27.4	
Jefferson Campos (Suzano)	29.8	
Victor Correia (Joinville)	33.0	
Eric Tatu (Brasília)	33.7	

=== NBB All-Star Game ===
On February 25, the election on the Internet finished, and the starter players were defined, according to the official site of NBB All-Star Game.

Jeff Agba, from Bauru, was originally selected to take part in the NBB Mundo team, but he injured and was replaced by Tyrone Curnell, from Palmeiras, while Guilherme Giovannoni, from Brasília, also was taken out of the game because of damage in his thigh, and for his place was named Jefferson William, from São José.

==== Roster ====
NBB Brasil
Pos	Player	Team	No. of selections	Votes (%)
Starters
PG	Larry Taylor	Bauru	5	43.3
SG	Alex Garcia (MVP)	Brasília	5	26.6
SF	Marquinhos	Flamengo	4	44.2
PF	Olivinha	Flamengo	5	22.6
C	Caio Torres	Flamengo	2	20.5
Reserves
PG	Fúlvio de Assis	São José	3	28.7
PG	Nezinho dos Santos	Brasília	3	27.9
PG	Paulinho Boracini	Pinheiros	1	14.7
SG	Vítor Benite	Flamengo	3	14.4
C	Rafael Mineiro	Pinheiros	2	14.6
PF	Luis Gruber	Uberlândia	1	11.3
PF	Jefferson William	São José	2	N/A^{1}
Head coach: José Alves Neto (Flamengo)

^{1}Replacing Guilherme Giovannoni (30.9%)

NBB Mundo
Pos	Player	Team	No. of selections	Votes (%)
Starters
PG	(United States) Kenny Dawkins	Liga Sorocabana	1	47.2
SG	(United States) Shamell Stallworth	Pinheiros	5	26.5
SF	(United States) Robert Day	Uberlândia	3	25.1
PF	(United States) DeAndre Coleman	Bauru	1	15.6
C	(United States) Steven Toyloy	Paulistano	2	33.5
Reserves
PG	(United States) Kojo Mensah	Flamengo	1	37.2
PG	(United States) Mark Borders	Minas	2	15.5
SF	(United States) Benzor Simmons	Vila Velha	1	17.3
SG	(United States) Joe Smith	Pinheiros	1	15.6
SF	(United States) Desmond Holloway	Liga Sorocabana	1	15.5
C	(Paraguay) Guillermo Araujo	Pinheiros	2	12.7
PF	(United States) Tyrone Curnell	Palmeiras	1	N/A^{2}
Head coach: Lula Ferreira (Franca)

^{2}Replacing Jeff Agba (38.2%)

==== Game ====
Globo
SporTV

March 2, 2013
10:00 (UTC−03:00)

Report

NBB Brasil 146, NBB Mundo 144 (OT)
Scoring by quarter: 36–34, 42–28, 23–34, 31–36, Overtime: 14–12
Pts: Alex 26; Rebs: Rafael Mineiro 9 Asts: Nezinho 7	Pts: Shamell 37; Rebs: Toyloy 14; Asts: Borders 5

Ginásio Nilson Nelson, Brasília, Federal District
Attendance: 5,212
Referees: Cristiano Maranho, Marcos Benito, Diego Chiconato

== Playoffs ==
First Round (Best-of-5)
(8) Basquete Cearense	2
(9) Paulistano	3
(7) São José	3
(10) Minas	1
(6) Pinheiros	3
(11) Limeira	2
(5) Franca	3
(12) Liga Sorocabana	0

Quarterfinals (Best-of-5)
(1) Flamengo	3
(9) Paulistano	0
(2) Brasília	2
(7) São José	3
(3) Uberlândia	3
(6) Pinheiros	2
(4) Bauru	3
(5) Franca	2

Semifinals (Best-of-5)
(1) Flamengo	3
(7) São José	2
(3) Uberlândia	3
(4) Bauru	0

Final (Single game)
(1) Flamengo	77
(3) Uberlândia	70

=== First round ===
==== (5) Franca vs. (12) Liga Sorocabana ====
Game 1

SporTV

April 16, 2013
20:00 UTC−03:00

Report

Liga Sorocabana 69, Franca 72
Scoring by quarter: 16–16, 13–15, 18–22, 22–19
Pts: Dawkins 17; Rebs: De Bem 9 Asts: Dawkins, Holloway 5	Pts: Figueroa 13; Rebs: Teichmann, Lucas Mariano 4 Asts: Jhonatan 4

Ginásio Gualberto Moreira, Sorocaba, São Paulo
Attendance: 1,042
Referees: Cristiano Maranho, Fábio Kover, Leandro Sehnem

Game 2

April 19, 2013
20:00 UTC−03:00

Report

Franca 74, Liga Sorocabana 55
Scoring by quarter: 12–9, 14–17, 23–10, 25–19
Pts: Kurtz 14; Rebs: Teichmann 8 Asts: Figueroa 7	Pts: Holloway 18; Rebs: De Bem 8 Asts: Dawkins 4

Ginásio Pedrocão, Franca, São Paulo
Attendance: 3,227
Referees: Marcos Benito, Jacob Barreto, Vinicius da Silva

Game 3

April 20, 2013
19:00 UTC−03:00

Report

Franca 72, Liga Sorocabana 70
Scoring by quarter: 18–17, 1–18, 30–10, 23–25
Pts: Teichmann 24; Rebs: Lucas Mariano 12; Asts: Figueroa 8	Pts: Holloway 24; Rebs: Daniel Conti 9 Asts: Dawkins 3
Franca wins series, 3–0

Ginásio Pedrocão, Franca, São Paulo
Attendance: 3,728
Referees: José Pelissari, Guilherme Locatelli, Mauricio Serour

==== (6) Pinheiros vs. (11) Limeira ====
Game 1

April 18, 2013
20:00 UTC−03:00

Report

Limeira 88, Pinheiros 74
Scoring by quarter: 24–16, 15–16, 34–15, 15–27
Pts: Ramón 15; Rebs: Daniel Alemão 10; Asts: Hélio 7	Pts: Shamell 19; Rebs: Fiorotto 7 Asts: Shamell 5

Ginásio Vô Lucato, Limeira, São Paulo
Attendance: 1,105
Referees: José Pelissari, Vander Nunes Jr., Diego Chiconato

Game 2

SporTV

April 21, 2013
13:30 UTC−03:00

Report

Pinheiros 82, Limeira 95
Scoring by quarter: 11–26, 27–17, 14–22, 30–30
Pts: Smith 19; Rebs: Shamell 6 Asts: Fernando Penna 7	Pts: Hélio 25; Rebs: Daniel Alemão 10; Asts: Hélio 8

Poliesportivo Henrique Villaboim, São Paulo, São Paulo
Attendance: 626
Referees: Fernando Serpa, Guilherme Locatelli, Mauricio Serour

Game 3

SporTV

April 22, 2013
19:15 UTC−03:00

Report

Pinheiros 93, Limeira 82
Scoring by quarter: 23–21, 21–29, 25–18, 24–14
Pts: Shamell 22; Rebs: Bambú 8 Asts: Shamell 6	Pts: Ramón 15; Rebs: Hélio, Fernando Mineiro 5 Asts: Ramón 5

Poliesportivo Henrique Villaboim, São Paulo, São Paulo
Attendance: 499
Referees: Cristiano Maranho, Jacob Barreto, Leandro Sehnem

Game 4

April 24, 2013
20:00 UTC−03:00

Report

Limeira 85, Pinheiros 86
Scoring by quarter: 20–15, 23–13, 20–26, 22–32
Pts: Diego 21; Rebs: Daniel Alemão 9 Asts: Hélio 5	Pts: Shamell 19; Rebs: Shamell 9 Asts: Shamell 6

Ginásio Vô Lucato, Limeira, São Paulo
Attendance: 1,590
Referees: Fernando Serpa, José Pelissari, Vander Nunes Jr.

Game 5

April 26, 2013
19:15 UTC−03:00

Report

Pinheiros 97, Limeira 77
Scoring by quarter: 27–18, 29–18, 22–25, 19–16
Pts: Shamell 28; Rebs: Shamell 10; Asts: Smith 7	Pts: three players 14; Rebs: Hélio 8 Asts: Hélio, Fernando Mineiro 3
Pinheiros wins series, 3–2

Poliesportivo Henrique Villaboim, São Paulo, São Paulo
Attendance: 906
Referees: Cristiano Maranho, Fernando Serpa, Marcos Ferreira

==== (7) São José vs. (10) Minas ====
Game 1

April 16, 2013
20:00 UTC−03:00

Report

Minas 70, São José 68
Scoring by quarter: 10–14, 26–23, 16–14, 18–17
Pts: Mineiro, Crosby 21; Rebs: Mineiro 9 Asts: Borders 8	Pts: Calvo 24; Rebs: Murilo 9 Asts: Laws 6

Arena Vivo, Belo Horizonte, Minas Gerais
Attendance: 388
Referees: Fernando Oliveira, Marcos Ferreira, Maria Cláudia Moraes

Game 2

SporTV

April 19, 2013
19:00 UTC−03:00

Report

São José 61, Minas 60
Scoring by quarter: 21–20, 16–14, 12–17, 12–9
Pts: Fúlvio 16; Rebs: Murilo 17; Asts: Fúlvio 7	Pts: Betinho 14; Rebs: Crosby 8 Asts: Crosby 5

Ginásio Lineu de Moura, São José dos Campos, São Paulo
Attendance: 1,837
Referees: Guilherme Locatelli, Jonas Pereira, Diego Chiconato

Game 3

April 20, 2013
18:00 UTC−03:00

Report

São José 67, Minas 64
Scoring by quarter: 13–23, 21–11, 15–15, 18–15
Pts: Dedé 21; Rebs: Dedé 7 Asts: Laws 7	Pts: Betinho 18; Rebs: Douglas Nunes 6 Asts: Borders 8

Ginásio Lineu de Moura, São José dos Campos, São Paulo
Attendance: 2,338
Referees: Marcos Benito, Vander Nunes Jr., Gustavo Mathias

Game 4

April 22, 2013
20:00 UTC−03:00

Report

Minas 59, São José 75
Scoring by quarter: 9–20, 19–14, 17–24, 14–17
Pts: Betinho 16; Rebs: Betinho, Douglas Nunes 6 Asts: Betinho, Borders 3	Pts: Murilo 21; Rebs: Murilo 11; Asts: Fúlvio 9
São José wins series, 3–1

Arena Vivo, Belo Horizonte, Minas Gerais
Attendance: 456
Referees: Fernando Serpa, José Pelissari, Andreia Silva

==== (8) Basquete Cearense vs. (9) Paulistano ====
Game 1

April 16, 2013
19:00 UTC−03:00

Report

Paulistano 95, Basquete Cearense 74
Scoring by quarter: 16–17, 35–7, 23–30, 21–20
Pts: Manteguinha 20; Rebs: Wagner 10; Asts: three players 3	Pts: Jimmy 22; Rebs: Drudi 14; Asts: Matheus 4

Ginásio Antônio Prado Junior, São Paulo, São Paulo
Attendance: 510
Referees: Marcos Benito, Jacob Barreto, Andreia Silva

Game 2

SporTV

April 19, 2013
21:30 UTC−03:00

Report

Basquete Cearense 79, Paulistano 66
Scoring by quarter: 22–15, 20–23, 21–16, 16–12
Pts: André Góes 29; Rebs: Felipe 12; Asts: André Góes 4	Pts: Wagner 15; Rebs: Renato Carbonari 6 Asts: Elinho 3

Ginásio Paulo Sarasate, Fortaleza, Ceará
Attendance: 7,029
Referees: Fernando Serpa, Fábio Kover, Eduardo Albano

Game 3

April 20, 2013
19:00 UTC−03:00

Report

Basquete Cearense 87, Paulistano 71
Scoring by quarter: 15–17, 33–16, 12–16, 27–22
Pts: Drudi 23; Rebs: Drudi 5 Asts: Jimmy 6	Pts: Toyloy 21; Rebs: three players 4 Asts: Elinho 5

Ginásio Paulo Sarasate, Fortaleza, Ceará
Attendance: 6,315
Referees: Cristiano Maranho, Francisco Ferreira Filho, Andreza Almeida

Game 4

April 23, 2013
19:00UTC−03:00

Report

Paulistano 89, Basquete Cearense 85
Scoring by quarter: 25–26, 22–16, 26–24, 16–19
Pts: Elinho 17; Rebs: Elinho 7 Asts: Alex Oliveira 3	Pts: André Góes 26; Rebs: Drudi 7 Asts: André Góes, Felipe 4

Ginásio Antônio Prado Junior, São Paulo, São Paulo
Attendance: 795
Referees: Cristiano Maranho, Vander Nunes Jr., Jacob Barreto

Game 5

SporTV

April 26, 2013
19:00 UTC−03:00

Report

Basquete Cearense 68, Paulistano 69
Scoring by quarter: 18–18, 12–9, 22–22, 16–20
Pts: Drudi 18; Rebs: Felipe 10; Asts: Rogério, Edu Mariano 4	Pts: Elinho 16; Rebs: Wagner, Alex Oliveira 8 Asts: Manteguinha 4
Paulistano wins series, 3–2

Ginásio Paulo Sarasate, Fortaleza, Ceará
Attendance: 7,406
Referees: José Pelissari, Marcos Benito, Jacob Barreto

=== Quarterfinals ===
==== (1) Flamengo vs. (9) Paulistano ====
Game 1

April 29, 2013
20:00 UTC−03:00

Report

Paulistano 91, Flamengo 100
Scoring by quarter: 15–27, 13–25, 40–23, 23–25
Pts: Elinho 22; Rebs: Toyloy 12; Asts: Elinho 6	Pts: Marquinhos 24; Rebs: Marquinhos, Kojo 5 Asts: Kojo 10

Ginásio Antônio Prado Junior, São Paulo, São Paulo
Attendance: 983
Referees: Fernando Serpa, Francisco Ferreira Filho, Leandro Sehnem

Game 2

May 2, 2013
20:30 UTC−03:00

Report

Flamengo 80, Paulistano 76
Scoring by quarter: 13–21, 9–17, 34–15, 24–23
Pts: Marquinhos 19; Rebs: Marquinhos 6 Asts: Marquinhos 3	Pts: Eddy 16; Rebs: Toyloy, Elinho 6 Asts: Elinho 6

Ginásio Álvaro Vieira Lima, Rio de Janeiro, Rio de Janeiro
Attendance: 1,516
Referees: Cristiano Maranho, Marcos Benito, Vander Nunes Jr.

Game 3

SporTV

May 4, 2013
21:30 UTC−03:00

Report

Flamengo 84, Paulistano 64
Scoring by quarter: 25–18, 16–16, 27–15, 16–15
Pts: Olivinha 22; Rebs: Olivinha 13; Asts: Kojo 6	Pts: Alex Oliveira 19; Rebs: Toyloy 9 Asts: Manteguinha 3
Flamengo wins series, 3–0

Ginásio Álvaro Vieira Lima, Rio de Janeiro, Rio de Janeiro
Attendance: 2,362
Referees: José Pelissari, Guilherme Locatelli, Jacob Barreto

==== (2) Brasília vs. (7) São José ====
Game 1

SporTV

April 29, 2013
21:00 UTC−03:00

Report

São José 90, Brasília 76
Scoring by quarter: 17–24, 19–19, 22–18, 32–15
Pts: Murilo 21; Rebs: Murilo 9 Asts: Fúlvio 13	Pts: Giovannoni 19; Rebs: Paulão Prestes, Alex 7 Asts: Giovannoni, Nezinho 4

Ginásio Lineu de Moura, São José dos Campos, São Paulo
Attendance: 2,362
Referees: José Pelissari, Jacob Barreto, Andreia Silva

Game 2

SporTV

May 1, 2013
17:00 UTC−03:00

Report

Brasília 100, São José 79
Scoring by quarter: 25–12, 28–18, 24–25, 23–24
Pts: Nezinho 25; Rebs: Paulão Prestes 14; Asts: Nezinho 5	Pts: Dedé 18; Rebs: Chico, Jefferson 6 Asts: Fúlvio 4

Ginásio Nilson Nelson, Brasília, Federal District
Attendance: 2,958
Referees: Fernando Serpa, Guilherme Locatelli, Fabio Kover

Game 3

SporTV

May 3, 2013
21:00 UTC−03:00

Report

Brasília 91, São José 76
Scoring by quarter: 30–21, 16–20, 27–18, 18–17
Pts: Nezinho 36; Rebs: Paulão Prestes 9 Asts: Nezinho 7	Pts: Murilo 25; Rebs: Murilo, Fúlvio 10; Asts: Fúlvio 6

Ginásio Nilson Nelson, Brasília, Federal District
Attendance: 3,416
Referees: Cristiano Maranho, Marcos Benito, Diego Chiconato

Game 4

May 6, 2013
20:00 UTC−03:00

Report

São José 84, Brasília 70
Scoring by quarter: 30–14, 15–16, 21–17, 18–23
Pts: Murilo 25; Rebs: Murilo 11; Asts: Fúlvio 7	Pts: Giovannoni 18; Rebs: Cipriano 6 Asts: Nezinho, Eric Tatu 5

Ginásio Lineu de Moura, São José dos Campos, São Paulo
Attendance: 2,652
Referees: Fernando Serpa, Vander Nunes Jr., Andreia Silva

Game 5

SporTV

May 9, 2013
19:00 UTC−03:00

Report

Brasília 81, São José 98
Scoring by quarter: 17–18, 17–18, 27–33, 20–29
Pts: Nezinho 16; Rebs: Paulão Prestes 12; Asts: Nezinho 5	Pts: Laws 29; Rebs: Murilo 10; Asts: Laws, Fúlvio 6
São José wins series, 3–2

Ginásio Nilson Nelson, Brasília, Federal District
Attendance: 4,411
Referees: Cristiano Maranho, Marcos Benito, Guilherme Locatelli

==== (3) Uberlândia vs. (6) Pinheiros ====
Game 1

SporTV

April 29, 2013
19:00 UTC−03:00

Report

Pinheiros 67, Uberlândia 86
Scoring by quarter: 27–24, 7–24, 11–21, 22–17
Pts: Márcio 14; Rebs: three players 4 Asts: Smith 4	Pts: Cipolini 24; Rebs: Collum 11; Asts: Collum 6

Poliesportivo Henrique Villaboim, São Paulo, São Paulo
Attendance: 521
Referees: Cristiano Maranho, Jonas Pereira, Eduardo Albano

Game 2

May 2, 2013
20:00 UTC−03:00

Report

Uberlândia 97, Pinheiros 103 (2OT)
Scoring by quarter: 16–28, 20–18, 12–15, 28–15, Overtime: 11–11, 10–16
Pts: Day 39; Rebs: Collum 9 Asts: Collum 11	Pts: Rafael Mineiro, Shamell 24; Rebs: Rafael Mineiro 9 Asts: Shamell 8

Ginásio Sabiazinho, Uberlândia, Minas Gerais
Attendance: 2,076
Referees: José Pelissari, Guilherme Locatelli, Diego Chiconato

Game 3

SporTV

May 4, 2013
19:30 UTC−03:00

Report

Uberlândia 70, Pinheiros 91
Scoring by quarter: 21–18, 18–20, 12–24, 19–29
Pts: Luis Gruber 16; Rebs: Day 8 Asts: Valtinho 4	Pts: Smith 32; Rebs: Shamell 7 Asts: Paulinho Boracini 6

Ginásio Sabiazinho, Uberlândia, Minas Gerais
Attendance: 2,510
Referees: Fernando Serpa, Marcos Benito, Vander Nunes Jr.

Game 4

SporTV

May 7, 2013
19:30 UTC−03:00

Report

Pinheiros 76, Uberlândia 89
Scoring by quarter: 23–24, 15–20, 18–17, 20–28
Pts: Shamell 19; Rebs: Márcio, Smith 4 Asts: Shamell 5	Pts: Cipolini 20; Rebs: three players 5 Asts: Collum 7

Poliesportivo Henrique Villaboim, São Paulo, São Paulo
Attendance: 723
Referees: Cristiano Maranho, Jacob Barreto, Diego Chiconato

Game 5

May 9, 2013
20:00 UTC−03:00

Report

Uberlândia 92, Pinheiros 85
Scoring by quarter: 23–14, 23–22, 24–23, 22–26
Pts: Valtinho 22; Rebs: Luis Gruber, Léo 8 Asts: Valtinho, Collum 6	Pts: Paulinho Boracini 20; Rebs: three players 3 Asts: Rafael Mineiro 5
Uberlândia wins series, 3–2

Ginásio Sabiazinho, Uberlândia, Minas Gerais
Attendance: 5,121
Referees: Fernando Serpa, José Pelissari, Vander Nunes Jr.

==== (4) Bauru vs. (5) Franca ====
Game 1

SporTV

April 28, 2013
13:00 UTC−03:00

Report

Franca 72, Bauru 69
Scoring by quarter: 22–21, 13–16, 21–16, 16–16
Pts: Léo Meindl 14; Rebs: Teichmann 10; Asts: Figueroa 9	Pts: Larry 21; Rebs: Jeff Agba 10; Asts: Larry 6

Ginásio Pedrocão, Franca, São Paulo
Attendance: 3,495
Referees: Cristiano Maranho, Marcos Ferreira, Eduardo Albano

Game 2

SporTV

May 1, 2013
19:30 UTC−03:00

Report

Bauru 86, Franca 79
Scoring by quarter: 19–21, 22–18, 21–21, 24–19
Pts: Coleman 23; Rebs: Larry 9 Asts: Larry, Mosso 4	Pts: Cauê Borges 18; Rebs: Figueroa 7 Asts: Figueroa 6

Ginásio Panela de Pressão, Bauru, São Paulo
Attendance: 2,087
Referees: José Pelissari, Marcos Benito, Diego Chiconato

Game 3

May 3, 2013
20:00 UTC−03:00

Report

Bauru 87, Franca 78
Scoring by quarter: 17–19, 25–17, 20–23, 25–19
Pts: Larry 20; Rebs: Coleman, Jeff Agba 12; Asts: Larry 6	Pts: Cauê Borges 19; Rebs: Antonio 5 Asts: Cauê Borges, Figueroa 3

Ginásio Panela de Pressão, Bauru, São Paulo
Attendance: 1,979
Referees: Fernando Serpa, Vander Nunes Jr., Jacob Barreto

Game 4

SporTV

May 6, 2013
19:00 UTC−03:00

Report

Franca 70, Bauru 62
Scoring by quarter: 23–2, 15–23, 12–24, 20–13
Pts: Léo Meindl 19; Rebs: Lucas Mariano 12; Asts: Figueroa 14	Pts: Coleman 16; Rebs: Jeff Agba 11; Asts: Jeff Agba 3

Ginásio Pedrocão, Franca, São Paulo
Attendance: 3,406
Referees: José Pelissari, Jonas Pereira, Jacob Barreto

Game 5

SporTV

May 10, 2013
21:00 UTC−03:00

Report

Bauru 78, Franca 71
Scoring by quarter: 27–14, 21–18, 19–20, 11–19
Pts: Larry 27; Rebs: Coleman 11; Asts: Pilar 7	Pts: Socas, Léo Meindl 19; Rebs: Teichmann 7 Asts: Figueroa, Teichmann 4
Bauru wins series, 3–2

Ginásio Panela de Pressão, Bauru, São Paulo
Attendance: 1,984
Referees: Cristiano Maranho, Marcos Benito, Guilherme Locatelli

=== Semifinals ===
==== (1) Flamengo vs. (7) São José ====
Game 1

SporTV

May 14, 2013
19:00 UTC−03:00

Report

São José 80, Flamengo 72
Scoring by quarter: 17–20, 17–13, 18–22, 28–17
Pts: Jefferson 27; Rebs: Jefferson 13; Asts: Fúlvio 13	Pts: Marquinhos 17; Rebs: Caio Torres 8 Asts: Marquinhos 5

Ginásio Lineu de Moura, São José dos Campos, São Paulo
Attendance: 2,348
Referees: Fernando Serpa, Vander Nunes Jr., Andreia Silva

Game 2

SporTV

May 17, 2013
21:00 UTC−03:00

Report

Flamengo 100, São José 84
Scoring by quarter: 27–23, 27–19, 24–20, 22–22
Pts: Caio Torres 23; Rebs: Caio Torres, Marquinhos 7 Asts: Kojo 6	Pts: Fúlvio 20; Rebs: Murilo 8 Asts: Dedé 3

HSBC Arena, Rio de Janeiro, Rio de Janeiro
Attendance: 5,250
Referees: Cristiano Maranho, Guilherme Locatelli, Diego Chiconato

Game 3

SporTV

May 19, 2013
20:00 UTC−03:00

Report

Flamengo 106, São José 86
Scoring by quarter: 26–22, 22–20, 31–28, 27–16
Pts: Olivinha 18; Rebs: Caio Torres 10; Asts: Kojo 4	Pts: Murilo 20; Rebs: Fúlvio 7 Asts: three players 2

HSBC Arena, Rio de Janeiro, Rio de Janeiro
Attendance: 6,130
Referees: José Pelissari, Marcos Benito, Jacob Barreto

Game 4

SporTV

May 23, 2013
19:00 UTC−03:00

Report

São José 96, Flamengo 88
Scoring by quarter: 30–19, 21–21, 24–32, 21–16
Pts: Jefferson 23; Rebs: Jefferson, Laws 6 Asts: Fúlvio 9	Pts: Marquinhos 29; Rebs: Olivinha 7 Asts: Kojo 4

Ginásio Lineu de Moura, São José dos Campos, São Paulo
Attendance: 2,400
Referees: Cristiano Maranho, Fernando Serpa, Vander Nunes Jr.

Game 5

SporTV

May 25, 2013
21:45 UTC−03:00

Report

Flamengo 88, São José 76
Scoring by quarter: 23–22, 16–20, 30–16, 19–18
Pts: Duda Machado 26; Rebs: Marquinhos 11; Asts: Gegê 6	Pts: Murilo 23; Rebs: Jefferson, Fúlvio 7 Asts: Fúlvio 9
Flamengo wins series, 3–2

HSBC Arena, Rio de Janeiro, Rio de Janeiro
Attendance: 11,330
Referees: Cristiano Maranho, José Pelissari, Marcos Benito

==== (3) Uberlândia vs. (4) Bauru ====
Game 1

SporTV

May 13, 2013
19:00 UTC−03:00

Report

Bauru 75, Uberlândia 89
Scoring by quarter: 13–19, 22–23, 23–26, 17–21
Pts: Pilar 22; Rebs: Andrezão, Ricardo Fischer 7 Asts: Pilar 5	Pts: Audrei 23; Rebs: Léo 9 Asts: Day, Valtinho 5

Ginásio Panela de Pressão, Bauru, São Paulo
Attendance: 1,956
Referees: Cristiano Maranho, Marcos Benito, Diego Chiconato

Game 2

SporTV

May 16, 2013
19:30 UTC−03:00

Report

Uberlândia 93, Bauru 65
Scoring by quarter: 23–17, 22–16, 31–18, 17–14
Pts: Cipolini 21; Rebs: Cipolini 8 Asts: Valtinho 7	Pts: Larry 16; Rebs: Jeff Agba 8 Asts: Ricardo Fischer 6

Ginásio Sabiazinho, Uberlândia, Minas Gerais
Attendance: 6,100
Referees: Fernando Serpa, Vander Nunes Jr., Jonas Pereira

Game 3

SporTV

May 18, 2013
21:45 UTC−03:00

Report

Uberlândia 80, Bauru 77
Scoring by quarter: 26–25, 15–23, 25–16, 14–13
Pts: Cipolini 19; Rebs: Cipolini 7 Asts: Valtinho 14	Pts: Gui Deodato 24; Rebs: Jeff Agba 10; Asts: Larry 8
Uberlândia wins series, 3–0

Ginásio Sabiazinho, Uberlândia, Minas Gerais
Attendance: 6,300
Referees: José Pelissari, Guilherme Locatelli, Jacob Barreto

=== Final ===
Globo
SporTV

June 1, 2013
10:00 UTC−03:00

Report

Flamengo 77, Uberlândia 70
Scoring by quarter: 21–15, 12–19, 25–15, 19–21
Pts: Caio Torres 23; Rebs: Olivinha 12; Asts: Marquinhos, Duda 3	Pts: Luis Gruber 20; Rebs: Cipolini 9 Asts: Robby Collum 6
Flamengo wins NBB Final Game

HSBC Arena, Rio de Janeiro, Rio de Janeiro
Attendance: 14,447
Referees: Cristiano Maranho, Marcos Benito, Fernando Serpa

== Promotion Tournament ==
During the NBB semifinals, Tijuca, the penultimate placed in the regular season in the NBB (the last placed Suzano later withdrawn due to financial troubles), as well as Fluminense and Macaé, the two finalists of the Super Copa Brasil de Basquete, played a small tournament between them to decide the two teams that would join the other sixteen teams in the 2013–14 NBB season. All matches were played in the Ginásio Álvaro Vieira Lima, Rio de Janeiro.

After two rounds, Tijuca remained in NBB with two wins and Macaé was promoted to his first season.

Game 1

May 15, 2013
19:00 UTC−03:00

Report

Tijuca 83, Macaé 80
Scoring by quarter: 19–13, 16–27, 26–23, 22–17
Pts: Arnaldinho 32; Rebs: César 8 Asts: Fred 6	Pts: Atílio 24; Rebs: Pablo 10; Asts: Pablo 3

Ginásio Álvaro Vieira Lima, Rio de Janeiro, Rio de Janeiro
Attendance: 321
Referees: José Pelissari, Marcos Benito, Andreia Silva

Game 2

May 16, 2013
19:00 UTC−03:00

Report

Macaé 82, Fluminense 81
Scoring by quarter: 24–14, 17–24, 22–18, 19–25
Pts: João Phyllipe 22; Rebs: Pablo 17; Asts: three players 2	Pts: De Souza 19; Rebs: Torres 10; Asts: Sucatzky 5

Ginásio Álvaro Vieira Lima, Rio de Janeiro, Rio de Janeiro
Attendance: 1,658
Referees: Cristiano Maranho, Jacob Barreto, Diego Chiconato

Game 3

May 17, 2013
18:00 UTC−03:00

Report

Tijuca 81, Fluminense 76
Scoring by quarter: 25–20, 12–9, 23–18, 21–29
Pts: César, Arnaldinho 14; Rebs: Renan 8 Asts: Fred 5	Pts: Pitú 15; Rebs: Gaspar 4 Asts: Sucatzky 4

Ginásio Álvaro Vieira Lima, Rio de Janeiro, Rio de Janeiro
Attendance: 492
Referees: Fernando Serpa, Vander Nunes Jr, Jonas Pereira

== Statistical leaders ==
=== Individual tournament highs ===
Points

Pos.	Name	G	Pts	PPG
1	(United States) Desmond Holloway (LSB)	37	751	20.30
2	(Brazil) Marquinhos (FLA)	43	872	20.28
3	(United States) Benzor Simmons (VIV)	34	630	18.53
4	(United States) Robert Day (UBE)	43	770	17.91
5	(United States) Kenny Dawkins (LSB)	31	552	17.81
6	(Brazil) Nezinho dos Santos (BRA)	33	584	17.70
7	(United States) Joe Smith (PIN)	39	673	17.26
8	(Brazil) Murilo Becker (SJO)	29	498	17.17
9	(Brazil) Betinho Duarte (MIN)	37	627	16.95
10	(United States) Jermaine Beal (MIN)	37	619	16.73

Rebounds

Pos.	Name	G	Reb.	RPG
1	(Brazil) Bábby (MOG)	31	271	8.74
2	(Brazil) Felipe Ribeiro (BCE)	39	327	8.38
3	(Brazil) Olivinha (FLA)	43	353	8.21
4	(Brazil) Paulão Prestes (BRA)	21	168	8.00
5	(Brazil) Murilo Becker (SJO)	29	216	7.45
6	(Brazil) Daniel Alemão (LIM)	37	273	7.38
7	(Brazil) Guilherme Teichmann (FRA)	39	280	7.18
8	(Brazil) Jeff Agba (BAU)	38	266	7.00
9	(Brazil) Jefferson William (SJO)	37	259	7.00
10	(Brazil) Guilherme Giovannoni (BRA)	36	246	6.83

Assists

Pos.	Name	G	Ass.	APG
1	(Brazil) Fúlvio de Assis (SJO)	44	331	7.52
2	(Brazil) Nezinho dos Santos (BRA)	33	208	6.30
3	(United States) Robby Collum (UBE)	29	168	5.79
4	(Brazil) Alexandre Pinheiro (VIV)	34	186	5.47
5	(Brazil) Valtinho (UBE)	23	116	5.04
6	(Argentina) Juan Pablo Figueroa (FRA)	41	190	4.63
7	(Brazil) Ricardo Fischer (BAU)	37	167	4.39
8	(Brazil) Larry Taylor (BAU)	40	174	4.35
9	(Brazil) Hélio Lima (LIM)	38	164	4.32
10	(Brazil) Jefferson Campos (SUZ)	33	138	4.18

Blocks

Pos.	Name	G	Blocks	BPG
1	(Brazil) Thiago Mathias (JOI)	32	44	1.38
2	(Brazil) Felipe Ribeiro (BCE)	39	51	1.31
3	(Brazil) Guilherme Teichmann (FRA)	39	47	1.21
4	(Brazil) Paulão Prestes (BRA)	21	23	1.10
5	(Brazil) Douglas Nunes (MIN)	37	36	0.97
6	(Brazil) Lucas Mariano (FRA)	42	40	0.95
7	(United States) Steven Toyloy (PAU)	41	35	0.85
8	(Brazil) Murilo Becker (SJO)	29	24	0.83
9	(Brazil) Jefferson William (SJO)	37	30	0.81
10	(Brazil) Ricardo Gaspar (SUZ)	19	15	0.79

Steals

Pos.	Name	G	Stls	SPG
1	(Brazil) Arlindo Neto (LSB)	37	78	2.11
2	(United States) Kenny Dawkins (LSB)	31	65	2.10
3	(Brazil) Jefferson Campos (SUZ)	33	64	1.94
4	(Brazil) Betinho Duarte (MIN)	37	69	1.86
5	(Brazil) Felipe Ribeiro (BCE)	39	70	1.79
6	(Brazil) Guilherme Teichmann (FRA)	39	68	1.74
7	(Argentina) Juan Pablo Figueroa (FRA)	41	70	1.71
8	(Brazil) Larry Taylor (BAU)	40	68	1.70
9	(United States) Caleb Brown (PAL)	33	56	1.70
10	(United States) Jay Parker (VIV)	34	57	1.68

Efficiency

Pos.	Name	G	EPG
1	(Brazil) Marquinhos (FLA)	43	21.05
2	(Brazil) Felipe Ribeiro (BCE)	39	21.03
3	(Brazil) Murilo Becker (SJO)	29	19.90
4	(Brazil) Guilherme Giovannoni (BRA)	36	19.59
5	(United States) Robert Day (UBE)	43	19.44
6	(United States) Desmond Holloway (LSB)	37	18.70
7	(Brazil) Olivinha (FLA)	43	18.44
8	(Brazil) Nezinho dos Santos (BRA)	33	18.27
9	(Brazil) Lucas Cipolini (UBE)	43	17.91
10	(United States) Shamell Stallworth (Pinheiros)	44	17.82

== Awards ==
=== NBB All-Team ===
Position	Player	Team
PG	Fúlvio de Assis	São José
SG	Robert Day	Uberlândia
SF	Marquinhos	Flamengo
PF	Rafael Mineiro	Pinheiros
C	Caio Torres	Flamengo

=== Individual awards ===
- MVP – Marquinhos (Flamengo)
- MVP of the Final – Caio Torres (Flamengo)
- Sixth Player – Léo Meindl (Franca)
- Best Defender – Alex Garcia (Brasília)
- Revelation – Ricardo Fischer (Bauru)
- Most Improved Player – Gui Deodato (Bauru)
- Coach – Lula Ferreira (Franca)
