= 2013–14 NBB season =

NBB 2013–14
- League: Novo Basquete Brasil
- Sport: Basketball
- Duration: November 2013–May 2014
- Teams: 17
- TV partner: SporTV Rede Globo

NBB season
- Champions: Flamengo
- Season MVP: (United States) David Jackson (Limeira)

NBB seasons
- ← 2012–13 2014–15 →

The 2013–14 NBB season was the sixth season of the Novo Basquete Brasil, the Brazilian basketball league. This tournament was organized entirely by the Liga Nacional de Basquete (LNB). The NBB serves as a qualifying competition for international tournaments such as Liga Sudamericana and FIBA Americas League.

Seventeen teams playing each other in the regular season. At the end of the home and away matches round the top four teams qualified for the quarterfinals of the playoffs automatically, while the teams finishing in the 5th and 12th place participated in the first round of the playoffs to determine the other four teams in the quarterfinals, best of five matches, advances to the next phase who win three games.

For this season, the last two regular season placed was relegated to the newly created Liga Ouro, the NBB second division. The Liga Ouro winner receive the right to contest NBB in the next year.

== Participating teams ==
New teams in the league

- Macaé Basquete (Promotion Tournament runners-up)
- Universo/Goiânia (approved by the LNB)

Teams that left the league

- Cia do Terno/Romaço/Joinville (withdrew due to financial troubles)
- Tijuca/Rio de Janeiro (Promotion Tournament winner, withdrew due to financial troubles)
- Suzano/Cesumar/Campestre (withdrew due to financial troubles)

Team	Home city	Stadium	Capacity	Head coach	Season
Sky/Basquete Cearense	Fortaleza	Ginásio da UNIFOR; Ginásio Paulo Sarasate	2,200; 9,000	(Brazil) Alberto Bial	2nd
Paschoalotto/Bauru	Bauru	Ginásio Panela de Pressão	3,000	(Brazil) Guerrinha	6th
UniCEUB/BRB/Brasília	Brasília	Ginásio da ASCEB; Ginásio Nilson Nelson	3,050; 16,000	(Argentina) Sergio Hernández	6th
Espírito Santo Basquetebol^{1}	Vila Velha	Ginásio Municipal João Goulart	3,500	(Brazil) Ênio Vecchi	6th
Flamengo	Rio de Janeiro	Ginásio Hélio Maurício; HSBC Arena	800; 15,430	(Brazil) José Alves Neto	6th
Vivo/Franca	Franca	Ginásio Pedrocão	6,000	(Brazil) Lula Ferreira	6th
Universo/Goiânia	Goiânia	Ginásio Rio Vermelho; Arena Goiânia	6,000; 15,000	(Brazil) Márcio de Andrade	1st
Liga Sorocabana	Sorocaba	Ginásio Gualberto Moreira	3,000	(Brazil) Rinaldo Rodrigues	3rd
Winner/Kabum/Limeira	Limeira	Ginásio Vô Lucato	1,800	(Brazil) Demétrius Ferracciú	5th
Macaé Basquete	Macaé	Tênis Clube de Macaé; Ginásio Maurício Soares Bittencourt	3,000; 6,000	(Brazil) Léo Costa	1st
Minas Tênis Clube	Belo Horizonte	Arena Vivo	4,000	(Argentina) Carlos Romano	6th
Mogi das Cruzes/Helbor	Mogi das Cruzes	Ginásio Municipal Professor Hugo Ramos	5,000	(Spain) Paco García	2nd
Palmeiras/Meltex	São Paulo	Ginásio Palestra Itália	1,500	(Brazil) Hebert Coimbra	2nd
Paulistano/Unimed	São Paulo	Ginásio Antônio Prado Junior	1,500	(Brazil) Gustavo de Conti	6th
Pinheiros/Sky	São Paulo	Poliesportivo Henrique Villaboim	854	(Brazil) Cláudio Mortari	6th
São José/Unimed	São José dos Campos	Ginásio Lineu de Moura	2,620	(Brazil) Luiz Zanon	6th
Unitri/Magazine Luiza/Uberlândia	Uberlândia	Arena Multiuso Tancredo Neves	6,000	(Brazil) Brasília	4th

^{1}Vila Velha was renamed Espírito Santo from this season.

Locations of the 2013–14 NBB teams

== Managerial changes ==
Team	Outgoing manager	Manner of departure	Replaced by	Date of appointment
Palmeiras	(Brazil) Ênio Vecchi	Moved to technical coordinator	(Brazil) Hebert Coimbra	December 3, 2013
Uberlândia	(Brazil) Hélio Rubens Garcia	Sacked	(Brazil) João Batista	January 7, 2014
Espírito Santo	(Brazil) João Batista	Signed by Uberlândia	(Brazil) Ênio Vecchi	January 10, 2014
São José	(Brazil) Edvar Simões	Sacked	(Brazil) Luiz Zanon	January 21, 2014
Uberlândia	(Brazil) João Batista	Sacked	(Brazil) Brasília	April 1, 2014

== Regular season ==
=== League table ===
Pos	Team	Pld	W	L	PF	PA	PD	Pts	Qualification or relegation
1	Flamengo	32	26	6	2712	2433	+279	58	Quarterfinals Playoffs
2	Paulistano	32	23	9	2684	2500	+184	55	Quarterfinals Playoffs
3	Brasília	32	21	11	2770	2491	+279	53	Quarterfinals Playoffs
4	Limeira	32	21	11	2498	2350	+148	53	Quarterfinals Playoffs
5	Pinheiros	32	20	12	2664	2598	+66	52	First Round Playoffs
6	São José	32	19	13	2643	2607	+36	51	First Round Playoffs
7	Uberlândia	32	19	13	2647	2564	+83	51	First Round Playoffs
8	Bauru	32	18	14	2642	2602	+40	50	First Round Playoffs
9	Basquete Cearense	32	15	17	2472	2529	−57	47	First Round Playoffs
10	Franca	32	15	17	2565	2513	+52	47	First Round Playoffs
11	Palmeiras	32	15	17	2551	2583	−32	47	First Round Playoffs
12	Mogi das Cruzes	32	14	18	2591	2527	+64	46	First Round Playoffs
13	Macaé Basquete	32	13	19	2570	2605	−35	45	
14	Liga Sorocabana	32	10	22	2429	2696	−267	42	
15	Minas	32	10	22	2255	2404	−149	42	
16	Goiânia	32	9	23	2471	2643	−172	41	Relegation to Liga Ouro
17	Espírito Santo	32	4	28	2255	2774	−519	36	Relegation to Liga Ouro

Source: LNB – NBB

=== Results ===
	BCE	BAU	BRA	ESB	FLA	FRA	GOI	LSB	LIM	MAC	MIN	MOG	PAL	PAU	PIN	SJO	UBE
Basquete Cearense		84–80	88–77	78–60	81–88	80–65	102–85	92–87	73–64	78–75	60–71	71–69	70–69	54–77	94–97	74–64	86–96
Bauru	83–77		93–85	79–74	94–96	87–72	85–78	110–93	71–90	90–86	76–69	91–79	74–78	77–90	91–97	78–76	74–76
Brasília	88–75	82–72		98–73	79–81	87–72	91–82	102–65	82–67	96–71	82–54	78–85	71–77	100–77	84–82	90–91	84–75
Espírito Santo	82–74	85–88	66–110		60–77	61–85	51–65	70–81	84–99	65–89	68–67	70–73	90–95	84–99	50–97	86–79	70–79
Flamengo	72–69	85–66	84–82	90–73		92–89	83–69	95–72	81–71	79–69	90–59	92–76	84–76	80–58	71–80	59–81	82–77
Franca	73–61	77–76	75–70	106–82	70–80		61–63	80–73	81–82	82–68	84–65	74–78	95–62	83–84	94–74	91–82	92–75
Goiânia	75–63	83–87	72–101	82–83	74–95	83–78		92–90	65–67	66–72	53–62	64–78	81–77	74–76	74–88	100–85	75–94
Liga Sorocabana	92–83	72–85	83–84	75–67	79–98	79–88	96–98		74–76	73–54	79–76	81–79	79–84	60–82	82–76	73–80	74–87
Limeira	99–85	79–86	74–70	83–53	67–88	64–80	91–83	69–71		76–74	74–66	81–67	93–81	87–78	72–79	81–73	69–81
Macaé Basquete	80–74	98–94	78–91	85–67	103–95	95–80	84–79	91–67	62–76		85–69	79–74	101–93	68–80	77–80	82–85	72–65
Minas	79–81	71–77	62–71	73–62	84–66	59–65	75–74	75–77	64–62	67–65		94–93	85–75	75–65	66–75	87–90	83–91
Mogi das Cruzes	96–74	75–74	85–90	94–76	94–90	90–52	82–76	89–61	67–78	86–77	70–60		89–69	66–79	80–88	90–91	71–73
Palmeiras	69–85	87–84	82–94	103–64	71–84	89–84	86–63	69–71	67–85	92–85	63–57	98–91		75–68	90–73	92–74	68–64
Paulistano	94–79	87–66	96–74	96–61	67–98	96–86	95–93	96–70	56–72	110–93	80–66	93–89	76–67		100–81	92–93	90–79
Pinheiros	93–73	73–81	82–110	96–66	74–62	96–87	90–78	95–65	53–91	82–78	90–82	84–82	98–91	91–93		77–95	76–84
São José	54–71	78–88	77–87	88–72	74–94	86–77	82–75	87–72	76–82	96–88	79–72	90–78	92–79	79–73	79–70		83–85
Uberlândia	76–83	70–85	95–81	91–80	95–101	94–87	93–97	87–63	79–77	98–86	82–61	79–76	79–77	80–81	76–77	92–104	

Source: NBB Fixtures

== NBB All-Star Weekend ==
This season, the All-Star Weekend was played at Ginásio Paulo Sarasate in Fortaleza, Ceará on February 21–22, 2014. In the first day of the event, it was disputed the "Dunk Tournament", "Three-Point Tournament", "Skills Challenge" and the newly "Shooting Stars Competition". The NBB All-Star Game was played on the following day and NBB Brasil defeated NBB Mundo for the third straight year (126–116).

== Playoffs ==
First Round (Best-of-5)
(8) Bauru	3
(9) Basquete Cearense	0
(5) Pinheiros	1
(12) Mogi das Cruzes	3
(7) Uberlândia	2
(10) Franca	3
(6) São José	3
(11) Palmeiras	2

Quarterfinals (Best-of-5)
(1) Flamengo	3
(8) Bauru	1
(4) Limeira	2
(12) Mogi das Cruzes	3
(2) Paulistano	3
(10) Franca	2
(3) Brasília	0
(6) São José	3

Semifinals (Best-of-5)
(1) Flamengo	3
(12) Mogi das Cruzes	1
(2) Paulistano	3
(6) São José	2

Final (Single game)
(1) Flamengo	78
(2) Paulistano	73

=== First round ===
==== (5) Pinheiros vs. (12) Mogi das Cruzes ====
Game 1

April 9, 2014
19:00 UTC−03:00

Report

Pinheiros 85, Mogi das Cruzes 82
Scoring by quarter: 16–19, 25–14, 25–26, 19–23
Pts: Shamell 27; Rebs: Lucas Dias 6 Asts: Smith 7	Pts: Filipin 22; Rebs: Daniel Alemão 9 Asts: Filipin 5

Poliesportivo Henrique Villaboim, São Paulo, São Paulo
Attendance: 483
Referees: Fernando Serpa, Vander Nunes Jr., Leandro Sehnem

Game 2

SporTV

April 11, 2014
19:00 UTC−03:00

Report

Pinheiros 77, Mogi das Cruzes 90
Scoring by quarter: 13–20, 20–19, 20–24, 24–27
Pts: Smith 17; Rebs: Tavernari 8 Asts: Smith 5	Pts: Simões 24; Rebs: Agba 11; Asts: Gustavinho 5

Poliesportivo Henrique Villaboim, São Paulo, São Paulo
Attendance: 772
Referees: Sérgio Pacheco, Francisco Lima Filho, Eduardo Albano

Game 3

SporTV

April 15, 2014
19:30 UTC−03:00

Report

Mogi das Cruzes 85, Pinheiros 81
Scoring by quarter: 16–20, 18–23, 20–15, 31–23
Pts: Filipin 15; Rebs: Daniel Alemão 12; Asts: Toledo 5	Pts: Shamell 32; Rebs: four players 5 Asts: Smith 10

Ginásio Professor Hugo Ramos, Mogi das Cruzes, São Paulo
Attendance: 5,000
Referees: Cristiano Maranho, Marcos Ferreira, Maria Cláudia Moraes

Game 4

April 17, 2014
20:00 UTC−03:00

Report

Mogi das Cruzes 86, Pinheiros 68
Scoring by quarter: 22–20, 19–19, 20–15, 25–14
Pts: Simões 18; Rebs: Daniel Alemão 15; Asts: Gustavinho 7	Pts: Rafael Mineiro 21; Rebs: three players 6 Asts: Smith 5
Mogi das Cruzes wins series, 3–1

Ginásio Professor Hugo Ramos, Mogi das Cruzes, São Paulo
Attendance: 3,347
Referees: José Pelissari, Jacob Barreto, Andreia Silva

==== (6) São José vs. (11) Palmeiras ====
Game 1

SporTV

April 7, 2014
19:00 UTC−03:00

Report

São José 78, Palmeiras 77 (OT)
Scoring by quarter: 18–17, 20–11, 13–16, 16–23, Overtime: 11–10
Pts: Caio Torres 20; Rebs: Jefferson 15; Asts: Quezada 19	Pts: Átila 18; Rebs: Stanic, Curnell 8 Asts: Stanic 16

Ginásio Lineu de Moura, São José dos Campos, São Paulo
Attendance: 2,320
Referees: Cristiano Maranho, Marcos Ferreira, Gregory Garcia

Game 2

April 9, 2014
20:00 UTC−03:00

Report

São José 80, Palmeiras 70
Scoring by quarter: 28–21, 16–15, 21–18, 15–16
Pts: Quezada 24; Rebs: Caio Torres 9 Asts: Quezada 5	Pts: Guto 18; Rebs: Tiagão 10; Asts: Stanic 12

Ginásio Lineu de Moura, São José dos Campos, São Paulo
Attendance: 2,580
Referees: José Pelissari, Fábio Kover, Maria Cláudia Moraes

Game 3

SporTV

April 13, 2014
18:00 UTC−03:00

Report

Palmeiras 85, São José 68
Scoring by quarter: 21–13, 23–19, 19–17, 22–19
Pts: Neto, Curnell 18; Rebs: Fabricio 6 Asts: Stanic 7	Pts: Dedé 18; Rebs: Caio Torres 7 Asts: Jefferson, Laws 3

Ginásio Palestra Itália, São Paulo, São Paulo
Attendance: 1,331
Referees: Fernando Serpa, Guilherme Locatelli, Gonçalo Gonçalves

Game 4

April 15, 2014
20:00 UTC−03:00

Report

Palmeiras 83, São José 69
Scoring by quarter: 19–11, 15–14, 26–24, 23–20
Pts: Stanic 19; Rebs: Fabricio 8 Asts: Stanic 8	Pts: Laws, Caio Torres 11; Rebs: Jefferson 9 Asts: Quezada 7

Ginásio Palestra Itália, São Paulo, São Paulo
Attendance: 1,354
Referees: Marcos Benito, Jonas Pereira, Diego Chiconato

Game 5

SporTV

April 19, 2014
16:00 UTC−03:00

Report

São José 64, Palmeiras 60
Scoring by quarter: 15–14, 16–16, 19–15, 14–15
Pts: Jefferson 16; Rebs: Jefferson 15; Asts: Quezada 6	Pts: Tiagão, Fabricio 12; Rebs: Tiagão 8 Asts: Stanic 6
São José wins series, 3–2

Ginásio Lineu de Moura, São José dos Campos, São Paulo
Attendance: 2,575
Referees: Cristiano Maranho, Vander Nunes Jr., Jacob Barreto

==== (7) Uberlândia vs. (10) Franca ====
Game 1

April 6, 2014
18:00 UTC−03:00

Report

Uberlândia 61, Franca 68
Scoring by quarter: 12–23, 21–18, 13–15, 15–12
Pts: Valtinho 15; Rebs: Valtinho, Day 5 Asts: Valtinho, Day 5	Pts: Léo Meindl 13; Rebs: Paulão Prestes 12; Asts: Figueroa 5

Ginásio Sabiazinho, Uberlândia, Minas Gerais
Attendance: 850
Referees: Sérgio Pacheco, Fábio Kover, Bruno Oliveira

Game 2

SporTV

April 8, 2014
19:15 UTC−03:00

Report

Uberlândia 69, Franca 67
Scoring by quarter: 13–17, 12–14, 24–18, 20–18
Pts: Day 23; Rebs: Day 7 Asts: Valtinho 9	Pts: Lucas Mariano 15; Rebs: Figueroa 9 Asts: Figueroa 3

Ginásio Sabiazinho, Uberlândia, Minas Gerais
Attendance: 580
Referees: Marcos Benito, Jacob Barreto, Vinicius da Silva

Game 3

SporTV

April 12, 2014
16:00 UTC−03:00

Report

Franca 61, Uberlândia 92
Scoring by quarter: 19–20, 11–21, 15–17, 16–34
Pts: Lucas Mariano 21; Rebs: Paulão Prestes 10; Asts: Figueroa 5	Pts: Cipolini 25; Rebs: Cipolini 9 Asts: Valtinho 10

Ginásio Pedrocão, Franca, São Paulo
Attendance: 1,222
Referees: José Pelissari, Guilherme Locatelli, Andreia Silva

Game 4

April 14, 2014
20:00 UTC−03:00

Report

Franca 82, Uberlândia 74
Scoring by quarter: 20–15, 17–20, 18–19, 27–20
Pts: Paulão Prestes 20; Rebs: Paulão Prestes 15; Asts: Figueroa 4	Pts: Day 22; Rebs: Day 7 Asts: Valtinho 6

Ginásio Pedrocão, Franca, São Paulo
Attendance: 2,029
Referees: Cristiano Maranho, Marcos Ferreira, Eduardo Albano

Game 5

SporTV

April 18, 2014
19:00 UTC−03:00

Report

Uberlândia 71, Franca 76
Scoring by quarter: 26–19, 12–15, 28–21, 5–21
Pts: Day 19; Rebs: Waszkiewicz 8 Asts: Valtinho 14	Pts: Paulão Prestes 19; Rebs: Jhonatan 9 Asts: Figueroa 7
Franca wins series, 3–2

Ginásio Sabiazinho, Uberlândia, Minas Gerais
Attendance: 3,347
Referees: Sérgio Pacheco, Jonas Pereira, Vander Nunes Jr.

==== (8) Bauru vs. (9) Basquete Cearense ====
Game 1

SporTV

April 9, 2014
20:00 UTC−03:00

Report

Bauru 79, Basquete Cearense 56
Scoring by quarter: 19–13, 22–12, 17–14, 21–17
Pts: Murilo 16; Rebs: Murilo 12; Asts: Larry 6	Pts: Brown, Davi 11; Rebs: Davi, Hardin 7 Asts: Davi 7

Ginásio Panela de Pressão, Bauru, São Paulo
Attendance: 821
Referees: Marcos Benito, Jacob Barreto, Diego Chiconato

Game 2

SporTV

April 11, 2014
21:30 UTC−03:00

Report

Bauru 97, Basquete Cearense 78
Scoring by quarter: 24–21, 18–18, 27–18, 28–21
Pts: three players 22; Rebs: Murilo 8 Asts: R. Fischer 6	Pts: Felipe 27; Rebs: Felipe 13; Asts: Brown, Davi 3

Ginásio Panela de Pressão, Bauru, São Paulo
Attendance: 1,070
Referees: Francisco Serpa, Jonas Pereira, Andreia Silva

Game 3

SporTV

April 14, 2014
19:00 UTC−03:00

Report

Basquete Cearense 78, Bauru 79
Scoring by quarter: 25–15, 16–24, 20–18, 17–22
Pts: Felipe 22; Rebs: Felipe 13; Asts: Davi 5	Pts: Murilo 15; Rebs: Murilo 10; Asts: Larry, R. Fischer 5
Bauru wins series, 3–0

Ginásio da UNIFOR, Fortaleza, Ceará
Attendance: 2,078
Referees: Sérgio Pacheco, Guilherme Locatelli, Gustavo Mathias

=== Quarterfinals ===
==== (1) Flamengo vs. (8) Bauru ====
Game 1

SporTV

April 26, 2014
21:30 UTC−03:00

Report

Flamengo 70, Bauru 74
Scoring by quarter: 21–10, 14–20, 21–19, 14–25
Pts: Marcelinho 16; Rebs: Meyinsse 12; Asts: Laprovíttola 8	Pts: F. Fischer 22; Rebs: Murilo 11; Asts: R. Fischer 9

Ginásio Álvaro Vieira Lima, Rio de Janeiro, Rio de Janeiro
Attendance: 1,197
Referees: José Pelissari, Vander Nunes Jr., Maria Cláudia Moraes

Game 2

April 28, 2014
20:00 UTC−03:00

Report

Flamengo 86, Bauru 69
Scoring by quarter: 21–16, 28–16, 20–19, 17–18
Pts: Marcelinho 31; Rebs: Marcelinho 9 Asts: Marquinhos, Laprovíttola 4	Pts: Murilo 14; Rebs: Murilo 7 Asts: R. Fischer 2

Ginásio Álvaro Vieira Lima, Rio de Janeiro, Rio de Janeiro
Referees: Sérgio Pacheco, Guilherme Locatelli, Diego Chiconato

Game 3

SporTV

May 3, 2014
16:00 UTC−03:00

Report

Bauru 73, Flamengo 92
Scoring by quarter: 19–25, 22–20, 14–28, 18–19
Pts: R. Fischer 17; Rebs: Murilo 13; Asts: R. Fischer 10	Pts: Olivinha 21; Rebs: Meyinsse 12; Asts: Laprovíttola, Marcelinho 6

Ginásio Panela de Pressão, Bauru, São Paulo
Attendance: 2,023
Referees: Cristiano Maranho, Jonas Pereira, Jabob Barreto

Game 4

SporTV

May 5, 2014
19:00 UTC−03:00

Report

Bauru 81, Flamengo 84
Scoring by quarter: 20–16, 19–21, 19–26, 23–21
Pts: R. Fischer 27; Rebs: Murilo 17; Asts: R. Fischer 5	Pts: Laprovíttola 24; Rebs: Olivinha, Marquinhos 5 Asts: Gegê 6
Flamengo wins series, 3–1

Ginásio Panela de Pressão, Bauru, São Paulo
Attendance: 1,774
Referees: Fernando Serpa, Marcos Benito, Andreia Silva

==== (4) Limeira vs. (12) Mogi das Cruzes ====
Game 1

April 25, 2014
20:00 UTC−03:00

Report

Limeira 97, Mogi das Cruzes 82
Scoring by quarter: 23–12, 22–26, 21–22, 31–22
Pts: Jackson 26; Rebs: Ramón, Bruno Fiorotto 5 Asts: Bruno Fiorotto 7	Pts: Toledo 19; Rebs: Toledo, Daniel Alemão 5 Asts: Smith 4

Ginásio Vô Lucato, Limeira, São Paulo
Attendance: 21
Referees: José Pelissari, Guilherme Locatelli, Maria Cláudia Moraes

Game 2

SporTV

April 27, 2014
15:00 UTC−03:00

Report

Limeira 83, Mogi das Cruzes 72
Scoring by quarter: 27–16, 28–26, 12–19, 16–11
Pts: Jackson 23; Rebs: Jackson 6 Asts: Hélio 5	Pts: Smith 17; Rebs: Daniel Alemão 12; Asts: Gustavinho 5

Ginásio Vô Lucato, Limeira, São Paulo
Attendance: 985
Referees: Cristiano Maranho, Marcos Ferreira, Andreia Silva

Game 3

SporTV

May 2, 2014
21:00 UTC−03:00

Report

Mogi das Cruzes 88, Limeira 81
Scoring by quarter: 21–16, 25–14, 20–26, 22–25
Pts: Toledo 21; Rebs: Daniel Alemão 11; Asts: Gustavinho 6	Pts: Ramón 25; Rebs: Bruno Fiorotto 6 Asts: Renato Lamas 5

Ginásio Municipal Professor Hugo Ramos, Mogi das Cruzes, São Paulo
Attendance: 5,000
Referees: Fernando Serpa, Marcos Benito, Fábio Kover

Game 4

SporTV

May 5, 2014
21:00 UTC−03:00

Report

Mogi das Cruzes 72, Limeira 60
Scoring by quarter: 16–14, 17–15, 17–14, 22–17
Pts: Toledo 21; Rebs: Toledo 12; Asts: Gustavinho 4	Pts: Ramón 18; Rebs: Bruno Fiorotto 5 Asts: Ramón 5

Ginásio Municipal Professor Hugo Ramos, Mogi das Cruzes, São Paulo
Attendance: 5,000
Referees: Sérgio Pacheco, Guilherme Locatelli, Vander Nunes Jr.

Game 5

SporTV

May 9, 2014
21:00 UTC−03:00

Report

Limeira 70, Mogi das Cruzes 75
Scoring by quarter: 19–16, 16–17, 17–18, 18–24
Pts: Jackson 30; Rebs: Jackson 5 Asts: Hélio 3	Pts: Gustavinho 20; Rebs: Sidão 8 Asts: Gustavinho 5
Mogi das Cruzes wins series, 3–2

Ginásio Vô Lucato, Limeira, São Paulo
Attendance: 1,119
Referees: José Pelissari, Marcos Benito, Fernando Serpa

Notes

1. Game was played behind closed doors due to punishment by Superior Court of Sports Justice.

==== (2) Paulistano vs. (10) Franca ====
Game 1

April 27, 2014
18:00 UTC−03:00

Report

Paulistano 82, Franca 72
Scoring by quarter: 14–19, 22–19, 19–12, 27–22
Pts: Holloway 23; Rebs: Renato Carbonari, Pilar 6 Asts: André 8	Pts: Paulão Prestes 18; Rebs: Paulão Prestes 10; Asts: three players 2

Ginásio Antônio Prado Junior, São Paulo, São Paulo
Attendance: 1,100
Referees: Sérgio Pacheco, Guilherme Locatelli, Gregory Garcia

Game 2

SporTV

April 29, 2014
21:00 UTC−03:00

Report

Paulistano 67, Franca 87
Scoring by quarter: 24–19, 12–17, 16–26, 15–25
Pts: Dawkins 14; Rebs: Mineiro 5 Asts: André 4	Pts: Léo Meindl 22; Rebs: Paulão Prestes 13; Asts: Paulão Prestes, Figueroa 4

Ginásio Antônio Prado Junior, São Paulo, São Paulo
Attendance: 830
Referees: Fernando Serpa, Francisco Lima Filho, Jacob Barreto

Game 3

SporTV

May 4, 2014
11:00 UTC−03:00

Report

Franca 71, Paulistano 81
Scoring by quarter: 26–26, 21–22, 9–14, 15–19
Pts: Paulão Prestes 17; Rebs: Figueroa 7 Asts: Figueroa 6	Pts: César 22; Rebs: Holloway 7 Asts: Dawkins 4

Ginásio Pedrocão, Franca, São Paulo
Attendance: 3,920
Referees: José Pelissari, Vander Nunes Jr., Andreia Silva

Game 4

SporTV

May 6, 2014
19:00 UTC−03:00

Report

Franca 97, Paulistano 87
Scoring by quarter: 23–18, 23–18, 19–25, 32–26
Pts: Basden 22; Rebs: Paulão Prestes 7 Asts: Figueroa 7	Pts: Dawkins 21; Rebs: Holloway 9 Asts: Holloway 5

Ginásio Pedrocão, Franca, São Paulo
Attendance: 3,857
Referees: Cristiano Maranho, Marcos Benito, Marcos Ferreira

Game 5

SporTV

May 9, 2014
19:00 UTC−03:00

Report

Paulistano 86, Franca 77
Scoring by quarter: 27–19, 18–13, 20–23, 21–22
Pts: Pilar 26; Rebs: Holloway 7 Asts: Holloway 5	Pts: Figueroa 24; Rebs: Paulão Prestes 10; Asts: Figueroa 6
Paulistano wins series, 3–2

Ginásio Antônio Prado Junior, São Paulo, São Paulo
Attendance: 1,100
Referees: Sérgio Pacheco, Guilherme Locatelli, Jacob Barreto

==== (3) Brasília vs. (6) São José ====
Game 1

April 26, 2014
11:00 UTC−03:00

Report

Brasília 82, São José 87
Scoring by quarter: 18–18, 23–14, 17–22, 24–33
Pts: Alex Garcia 24; Rebs: Goree 11; Asts: Alex Garcia, Osimani 4	Pts: Quezada 25; Rebs: Jefferson 13; Asts: three players 2

Ginásio Nilson Nelson, Brasília, Federal District
Attendance: 3,156
Referees: Cristiano Maranho, Guilherme Locatelli, Leandro Sehnem

Game 2

SporTV

April 28, 2014
19:00 UTC−03:00

Report

Brasília 82, São José 95
Scoring by quarter: 23–15, 15–25, 21–26, 23–29
Pts: Alex Garcia 31; Rebs: Alex Garcia 7 Asts: Nezinho 8	Pts: Quezada 50; Rebs: Jefferson 15; Asts: Quezada 5

Ginásio Nilson Nelson, Brasília, Federal District
Attendance: 2,039
Referees: Marcos Benito, Vander Nunes Jr., Gustavo Mathias

Game 3

May 2, 2014
20:00 UTC−03:00

Report

São José 72, Brasília 70
Scoring by quarter: 22–23, 18–14, 11–17, 21–16
Pts: Caio Torres 18; Rebs: Caio Torres 19; Asts: Quezada 4	Pts: Alex Garcia 17; Rebs: Goree, Alírio 6 Asts: Nezinho 6
São José wins series, 3–0

Ginásio Lineu de Moura, São José dos Campos, São Paulo
Attendance: 50
Referees: Sérgio Pacheco, Jacob Barreto, Eduardo Albano

Notes

1. Game was played behind closed doors due to punishment by Superior Court of Sports Justice.

=== Semifinals ===
==== (1) Flamengo vs. (12) Mogi das Cruzes ====
Game 1

SporTV

May 12, 2014
19:00 UTC−03:00

Report

Flamengo 88, Mogi das Cruzes 82
Scoring by quarter: 20–19, 21–16, 27–22, 20–25
Pts: Marquinhos 24; Rebs: Olivinha 13; Asts: Laprovíttola, Gegê 3	Pts: Filipin 18; Rebs: Sidão 8 Asts: Gustavinho, Daniel Alemão 3

Ginásio Álvaro Vieira Lima, Rio de Janeiro, Rio de Janeiro
Referees: Cristiano Maranho, Jonas Pereira, Diego Chiconato

Game 2

SporTV

May 14, 2014
20:00 UTC−03:00

Report

Flamengo 65, Mogi das Cruzes 69
Scoring by quarter: 19–16, 16–14, 16–20, 14–19
Pts: Laprovíttola 12; Rebs: Meyinsse 7 Asts: Laprovíttola 7	Pts: Agba, Toledo 15; Rebs: Toledo 13; Asts: Gustavinho 7

Ginásio Álvaro Vieira Lima, Rio de Janeiro, Rio de Janeiro
Referees: José Pelissari, Marcos Benito, Maria Cláudia Moraes

Game 3

SporTV

May 17, 2014
20:30 UTC−03:00

Report

Mogi das Cruzes 78, Flamengo 80
Scoring by quarter: 18–19, 19–21, 14–15, 27–25
Pts: Daniel Alemão 18; Rebs: Daniel Alemão 10; Asts: Smith 7	Pts: Marquinhos 29; Rebs: three players 5 Asts: Laprovíttola 9

Ginásio Municipal Professor Hugo Ramos, Mogi das Cruzes, São Paulo
Referees: Fernando Serpa, Guilherme Locatelli, Jacob Barreto

Game 4

SporTV

May 19, 2014
19:00 UTC−03:00

Report

Mogi das Cruzes 71, Flamengo 79
Scoring by quarter: 13–18, 21–14, 16–29, 21–18
Pts: Agba 20; Rebs: Agba, Daniel Alemão 6 Asts: four players 3	Pts: Meyinsse 34; Rebs: Meyinsse, Laprovíttola 6 Asts: Laprovíttola 6
Flamengo wins series, 3–1

Ginásio Municipal Professor Hugo Ramos, Mogi das Cruzes, São Paulo
Attendance: 5,000
Referees: Sérgio Pacheco, Marcos Benito, Vander Nunes Jr.

==== (2) Paulistano vs. (6) São José ====
Game 1

SporTV

May 13, 2014
19:30 UTC−03:00

Report

Paulistano 88, São José 71
Scoring by quarter: 16–22, 29–19, 29–22, 14–8
Pts: Dawkins 25; Rebs: Gemerson 10; Asts: Dawkins 4	Pts: Quezada 19; Rebs: Caio Torres 11; Asts: Quezada 4

Ginásio Antônio Prado Junior, São Paulo, São Paulo
Attendance: 1,138
Referees: Cristiano Maranho, Marcos Ferreira, Eduardo Albano

Game 2

SporTV

May 15, 2014
19:30 UTC−03:00

Report

Paulistano 78, São José 83
Scoring by quarter: 17–25, 18–15, 24–30, 19–13
Pts: Holloway 17; Rebs: Holloway 8 Asts: Dawkins, Pilar 4	Pts: Caio Torres 20; Rebs: Caio Torres 12; Asts: Quezada 9

Ginásio Antônio Prado Junior, São Paulo, São Paulo
Attendance: 1,230
Referees: Fernando Serpa, Vander Nunes Jr., Andreia Silva

Game 3

SporTV

May 18, 2014
16:00 UTC−03:00

Report

São José 74, Paulistano 80
Scoring by quarter: 16–9, 23–22, 21–19, 14–30
Pts: Jefferson 23; Rebs: Nelson 10; Asts: Laws 5	Pts: Holloway 18; Rebs: Mineiro 7 Asts: André 4

Ginásio Lineu de Moura, São José dos Campos, São Paulo
Referees: Sérgio Pacheco, Guilherme Locatelli, Fábio Kover

Game 4

SporTV

May 20, 2014
21:00 UTC−03:00

Report

São José 96, Paulistano 68
Scoring by quarter: 28–23, 25–12, 26–13, 17–20
Pts: Quezada 29; Rebs: Jefferson 14; Asts: Quezada 8	Pts: Carbonari 13; Rebs: Labbate 5 Asts: Pilar 4

Ginásio Lineu de Moura, São José dos Campos, São Paulo
Referees: Cristiano Maranho, José Pelissari, Diego Chiconato

Game 5

SporTV

May 23, 2014
21:00 UTC−03:00

Report

Paulistano 81, São José 68
Scoring by quarter: 13–19, 27–11, 21–14, 20–24
Pts: Holloway 30; Rebs: Holloway 10; Asts: Holloway 3	Pts: Dedé 21; Rebs: Jefferson 12; Asts: Laws 4
Paulistano wins series, 3–2

Ginásio Antônio Prado Junior, São Paulo, São Paulo
Referees: Cristiano Maranho, Marcos Benito, Vander Nunes Jr.

=== Final ===
Globo
SporTV

May 31, 2014
10:00 UTC−03:00

Report

Flamengo 78, Paulistano 73
Scoring by quarter: 22–17, 16–23, 21–17, 19–16
Pts: Meyinsse, Marcelinho 16; Rebs: Marcelinho 7 Asts: Laprovíttola 5	Pts: Holloway 15; Rebs: Carbonari 7 Asts: André 3
Flamengo wins NBB Final Game

HSBC Arena, Rio de Janeiro, Rio de Janeiro
Attendance: 15,449
Referees: Cristiano Maranho, Marcos Benito, Sérgio Pacheco

== Statistical leaders ==
=== Individual tournament highs ===
Points

Pos.	Name	G	PPG
1	(United States) Shamell Stallworth (PIN)	35	20.77
2	(Brazil) Leandro Barbosa (PIN)	8	20.75
3	(Uruguay) Emilio Taboada (GOI)	23	20.74
4	(United States) David Jackson (LIM)	37	20.57
5	(Brazil) Paulão Prestes (FRA)	40	18.73

Rebounds

Pos.	Name	G	RPG
1	(Brazil) Jefferson William (SJO)	45	9.80
2	(Brazil) Paulão Prestes (FRA)	40	9.40
3	(Argentina) Pablo Espinoza (MAC)	32	8.13
4	(Brazil) Felipe Ribeiro (BCE)	34	8.12
5	(Brazil) Olivinha (FLA)	41	8.07

Assists

Pos.	Name	G	APG
1	(Brazil) Valtinho (UBE)	37	7.49
2	(Argentina) Maximiliano Stanic (PAL)	21	7.19
3	(Brazil) Elinho Neto (MIN)	32	6.28
4	(Dominican Republic) Manny Quezada (SJO)	42	5.74
5	(Brazil) Nezinho dos Santos (BRA)	34	5.68

Blocks

Pos.	Name	G	BPG
1	(Brazil) Morro (PIN)	30	1.40
2	(Brazil) Douglas Nunes (MIN)	32	1.34
3	(Brazil) Léo Waszkiewicz (UBE)	29	1.17
4	(United States) Marcus Goree (BRA)	33	1.12
5	(United States) DeVon Hardin (BCE)	35	1.11

Steals

Pos.	Name	G	SPG
1	(Argentina) Maximiliano Stanic (PAL)	21	2.29
2	(Brazil) Biloca (BAU)	1	2.00
3	(Brazil) Gustavo Cortes (BAU)	1	2.00
4	(Brazil) Marcus Vinicius Toledo (MOG)	44	1.86
5	(Brazil) Edu Oliveira (ESB)	14	1.86

Efficiency

Pos.	Name	G	Eff
1	(Brazil) Gustavo Cortes (BAU)	1	22.00
2	(Brazil) Alex Garcia (BRA)	26	21.96
3	(Brazil) Paulão Prestes (FRA)	40	21.80
4	(United States) David Jackson (LIM)	37	20.62
5	(United States) Shamell Stallworth (PIN)	35	19.83

Source: LNB – NBB

== Awards ==
=== NBB All-Team ===
Position	Player	Team
PG	Nicolás Laprovíttola	Flamengo
SG	David Jackson	Limeira
SF	Marquinhos	Flamengo
PF	Jefferson William	São José
C	Paulão Prestes	Franca

=== Individual awards ===
- MVP – David Jackson (Limeira)
- Sixth Player – Hélio Lima (Limeira)
- Best Defender – Alex Garcia (Brasília)
- Revelation – Henrique Coelho (Minas)
- Most Improved Player – Paulão Prestes (Franca)
- Coach – Gustavo de Conti (Paulistano)
- MVP of the Final – Jerome Meyinsse (Flamengo)
