= 1997 World Jiu-Jitsu Championship =

Brazilian Jiu-Jitsu competitions

- Venue: Tijuca Tênis Clube
- Location: Rio de Janeiro, Brazil
- Dates: 1 April 1997
- Website: IBJJF

The 1997 World Jiu-Jitsu Championship, also known as II BJJ Mundials, was an international jiu-jitsu event organised by the International Brazilian Jiu-Jitsu Federation (IBJFF) and held at the Tijuca Tênis Clube in Rio de Janeiro, Brazil on 1 April 1997.

== Teams results ==
Results by Academy

Rank	Men's division (Note: The Women's division started the following year)	
Rank	Team	Points
1	Nova União	n/a
2	Gracie Barra|	n/a
3	Protesto	n/a
