= 2002 World Jiu-Jitsu Championship =

Brazilian Jiu-Jitsu competitions

The 2002 World Jiu-Jitsu Championship was held at Tijuca Tênis Clube, Rio de Janeiro, Brazil.
