= Basquete Universo/Goiânia =

Universo/Goiânia
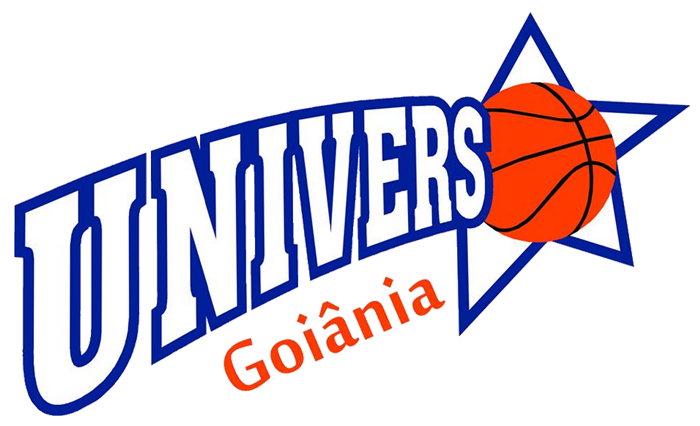
- Founded: 2000
- Arena: Ginásio Rio Vermelho (capacity: 6,000)
- Location: Goiânia, Brazil
- Team colors: White, Black and Orange
Home	Away

Basquete Universo/Goiânia, or simply Universo/Goiânia, is Brazilian basketball team headquartered in Goiânia, Brazil. The team was founded in 2000, but it ended its activities in 2006. In 2013 he resumed activities with the priority to reach a place in the main league in the country, Novo Basquete Brasil.

== History ==
The team of Univero/Goiânia was founded in 2000; the team achieved excellent results, especially the 2nd place in the Liga Sudamericana 2005 and the sixth state title (2000–2005), and the 3rd place in the Campeonato Brasileiro de Basquete, in 2004. But because of financial difficulties, ceased production in 2006.

In 2013, Universo/Goiânia returned to the Brazilian basketball to dispute Copa Brasil Centro-Oeste de Basquete, where became champion, guaranteeing the right to dispute the vacant Super Copa Brasil de Basquete. In Super Copa Brasi, the team won all the games in the qualifying round against Caxias do Sul (86–81), Sport (99–75) and Rio Claro (88–78), taking the Fluminense in the semi-final in a disputed game in which the team ended up losing by 106–108. In the dispute for third place, Universo/Goiânia played again against Rio Claro and won 100–92. Although the team did not have qualified to compete in the Tournament Access/Descent that gives access to 2013–14 NBB season, team presented a project to the Board of Directors of Liga Nacional de Basquete, who approved, on June 5, 2013, at a meeting held in the headquarters, in São Paulo, the requests of Fluminense and Universo/Goiânia to plead for a spot in the next edition of the NBB. Now, teams must still pass the technical evaluation, structural and financial, to be confirmed in next season's greatest basketball competition in the country.

== Roster ==
Note: Flags indicate national team eligibility at FIBA-sanctioned events. Players may hold other non-FIBA nationalities not displayed.

Universo/Goiânia roster
Players
Coaches

Pos.	No.	Nat.	Name	Ht.
F	9	(Brazil)	Oliveira, Fábio	1.95 m (6 ft 5 in)
G	10	(Brazil)	Figueiredo, Raphael	1.93 m (6 ft 4 in)
F/C	12	(Brazil)	Carvalho, Felippe	2.02 m (6 ft 8 in)
F	17	(Brazil)	Veloso, Murilo	1.96 m (6 ft 5 in)
F/C	32	(Brazil)	Figueiredo, Gustavo	2.04 m (6 ft 8 in)
C	33	(Brazil)	Lacerda, Everson	2.10 m (6 ft 11 in)
G/F	77	(Uruguay)	Taboada, Emilio	1.93 m (6 ft 4 in)

Head coach

- (Brazil) Márcio de Andrade

Assistant coach(es)

- (Brazil) Breno Pinheiro

Legend

- (C) Team captain
- Injured

== Honors ==
=== Regional ===
- Copa Brasil Centro-Oeste de Basquete:
  - Winner: 2013
