= Vinícius Bristott =

Brazilian basketball player

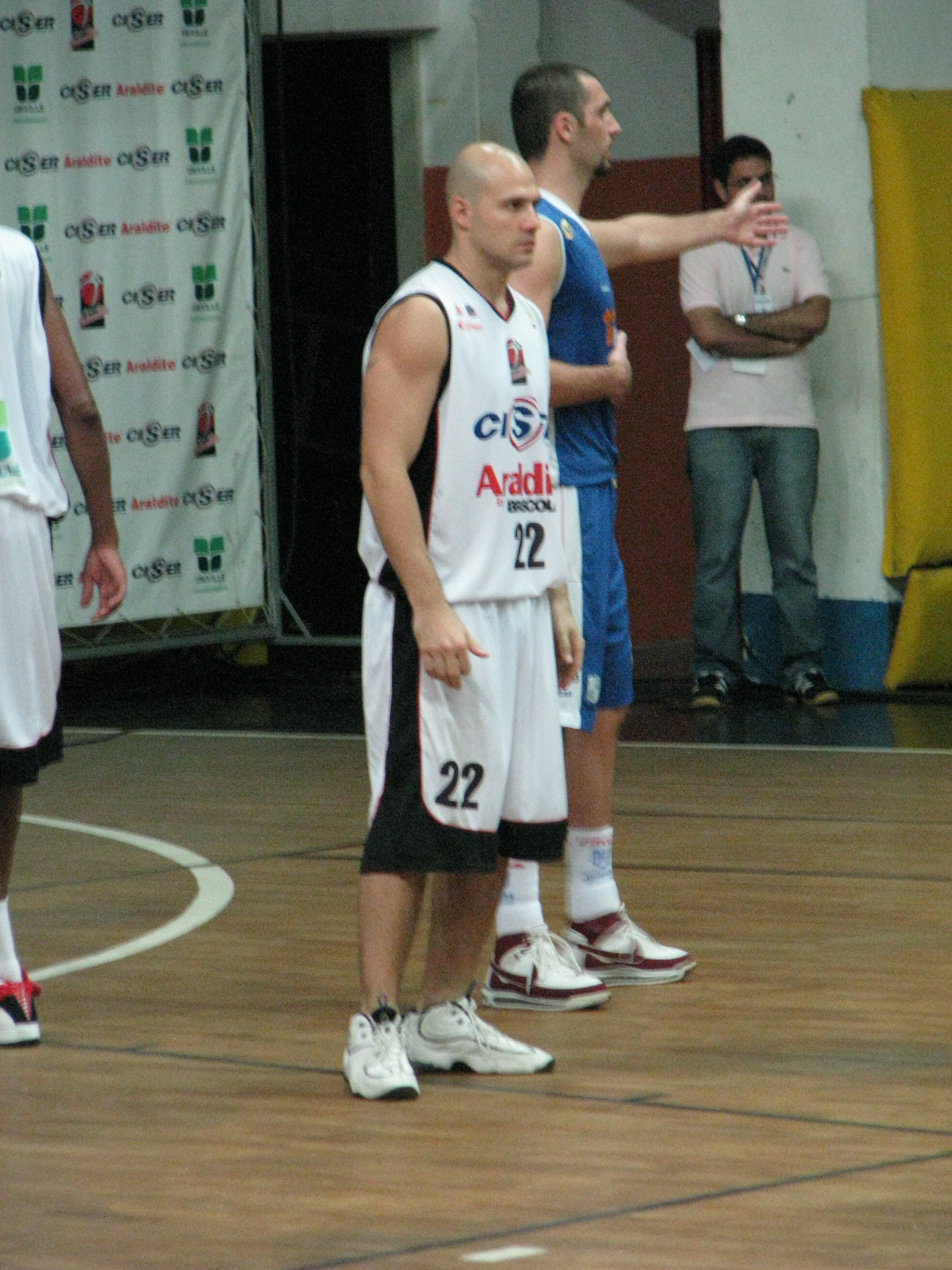
- Bristott on a 2010 playoff game

No. 22 – Araldite/Univille
- Position: Forward
- League: Novo Basquete Brasil

Personal information
- Born: November 27, 1981 (age 44) Passo Fundo, Rio Grande do Sul, Brazil
- Listed height: 6 ft 4 in (1.93 m)
- Listed weight: 227 lb (103 kg)

Vinícius da Silva Bristott, also known as Gaúcho, is a Brazilian professional basketball player. Bristott was born in Passo Fundo, Rio Grande do Sul, the southernmost state of Brazil.

== Previous teams ==
Before signing with Araldite/Univille, Bristott has played for these teams:

- Unisanta (Santos-SP)
- AD Guarujá (Guarujá-SP)
- Blumenau (Blumenau-SC)
- Videira (Videra-SC)

== Araldite/Univille - Joinville ==
Right after Joinville beat Bristott's previous team (Videira) in the state championship final, Bristott was hired to make part of Joinville's squad to compete in the 2009-2010 NBB season. He was mostly used as a 3rd option forward, coming in for Jefferson Sobral or Audrei Parisotto. For the first round in the 09-10 playoffs, Joinville had many injured players. Manteguinha, the starting point guard, Joao Victor, a center, and players like Sobral and Vezaro were doing some work away from Joinville. Their absences created extra time for players from the bench, and Bristott got some extra time on the court. He helped Joinville beat Vila Velha/CETAF in a 3-0 series, scoring 8 PPG, and playing for 8.4 MPG.

== NBB Stats ==
=== Regular season Stats ===
Year	Team	GP	GS	MPG	FG%	3P%	FT%	RPG	APG	SPG	BPG	PPG
2009–10	Joinville	10	0	10.4	.565	.600	.727	2.4	0.6	.8	.000	7.00

== Jogo das Estrelas ==
In early 2010, NBB hosted an All-Star weekend event in Uberlândia-MG. Vinícius Bristott was the selected player from Joinville to participate in the Slam Dunk contest. Bristott was eliminated on the first round, having a score only 2 points away from being able to move on to the final round. He successfully made a double-handed windmill, even though he can also do the one-handed windmill, and the eastbay dunk, as he has shown in pre-game warm-ups.
