= Centro de Treinamento Arremessando para o Futuro =

Espírito Santo Basquetebol
- Leagues: NBB
- Founded: 2000; 26 years ago
- Arena: Ginásio Tartarugão (capacity: 3,500)
- Location: Vila Velha, Brazil
- Team colors: Blue, Pink and White
- President: (Brazil) Luiz Felipe Azevedo
- Head coach: (Brazil) Ênio Vecchi
- Website: cetaf.com.br
Home	Away

Centro de Treinamento Arremessando para o Futuro, or simply Espírito Santo Basquetebol, is a Brazilian basketball team from Vila Velha, Espírito Santo, Brazil.

== History ==
Espírito Santo was founded in 2000 as CETAF/Vila Velha, but it disputed its first Brazilian championship in 2008, and at the same moment the team from Vila Velha also disputed Nossa Liga de Basquete. In 2009, they disputed the first edition of Novo Basquete Brasil, finished the regular in the tenth position and did not disputed the playoffs of that season. In the second season, 2009–10 NBB season, the team finished the regular in a worse position, twelfth place. But, due new rules of Liga Nacional de Basquete, it won the right to compete its first and only playoffs where it was defeated by Joinville, after a series by 3–0. In the two following seasons, Vila Velha made terrible campaigns. To the 2012–13 NBB season Vila Velha began a process of renovation of players and technical committee.

== Roster ==
Note: Flags indicate national team eligibility at FIBA-sanctioned events. Players may hold other non-FIBA nationalities not displayed.

Espírito Santo roster
Players
Coaches

Pos.	No.	Nat.	Name	Ht.
F	5	(Brazil)	Oliveira, Edu	1.95 m (6 ft 5 in)
G	6	(Brazil)	Christ, Vitor	1.75 m (5 ft 9 in)
F	7	(Brazil)	Poltronieri, Mateus	1.93 m (6 ft 4 in)
F	8	(Brazil)	Luxinger, Mateus	1.96 m (6 ft 5 in)
F	10	(Brazil)	Grandella, Rafael	1.95 m (6 ft 5 in)
F	11	(United States)	Muojeke, Afam	2.07 m (6 ft 9 in)
C	12	(Brazil)	Filé, Daniel	2.07 m (6 ft 9 in)
C	15	(Brazil)	Gouraskas, Douglas	2.05 m (6 ft 9 in)
G/F	17	(United States)	McClemore, Rashaun	1.88 m (6 ft 2 in)
F/C	18	(Brazil)	Gaspar, Ricardo	2.05 m (6 ft 9 in)
F	19	(Brazil)	Gonzaga, Cicero	2.02 m (6 ft 8 in)
F	21	(Brazil)	Vesper, Robson	1.95 m (6 ft 5 in)
G	23	(United States)	Collins, C.J.	1.89 m (6 ft 2 in)
G	32	(Brazil)	Moreira Filho, Arnaldo	1.87 m (6 ft 2 in)

Head coach

- (Brazil) Ênio Vecchi

Assistant coach(es)

- (Brazil) Luiz Felipe Filho
- (Brazil) Márcio Azevedo

Legend

- (C) Team captain
- Injured

- Roster
Updated: 2014-01-22
