= Espiga =

Brazilian basketball player (born 1972)

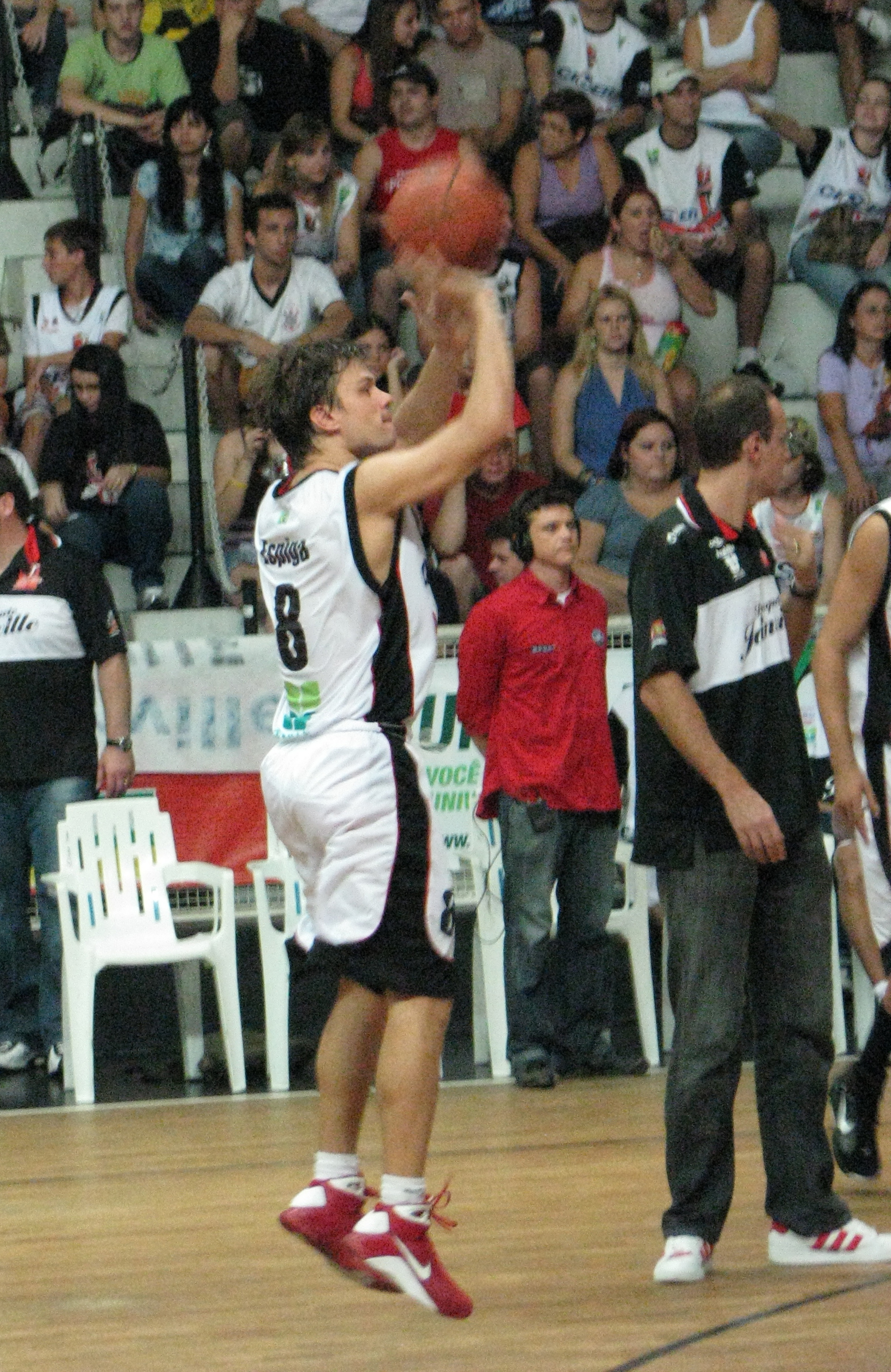
- Espiga warming up his 3PT shots at an April 2010 playoff game

No. 8 – Ciser/Araldite/Univille
- Position: Point guard
- League: Novo Basquete Brasil

Personal information
- Born: December 13, 1972 (age 53) Rio de Janeiro, Rio de Janeiro, Brazil
- Listed height: 6 ft 2 in (1.88 m)
- Listed weight: 194 lb (88 kg)

Flávio Aurélio dos Santos Soares (Espiga) is a Brazilian professional basketball player, who plays in the Novo Basquete Brasil league.

== Previous Teams ==
- Vasco da Gama
- Report Suzano
- Report Mogi
- Tijuca Tênis Clube
- Corinthians/RS
- Jequiá I.C.
- Fluminense
- Unit/Uberlândia
- Minas Tênis Clube

== Ciser/Araldite/Univille ==
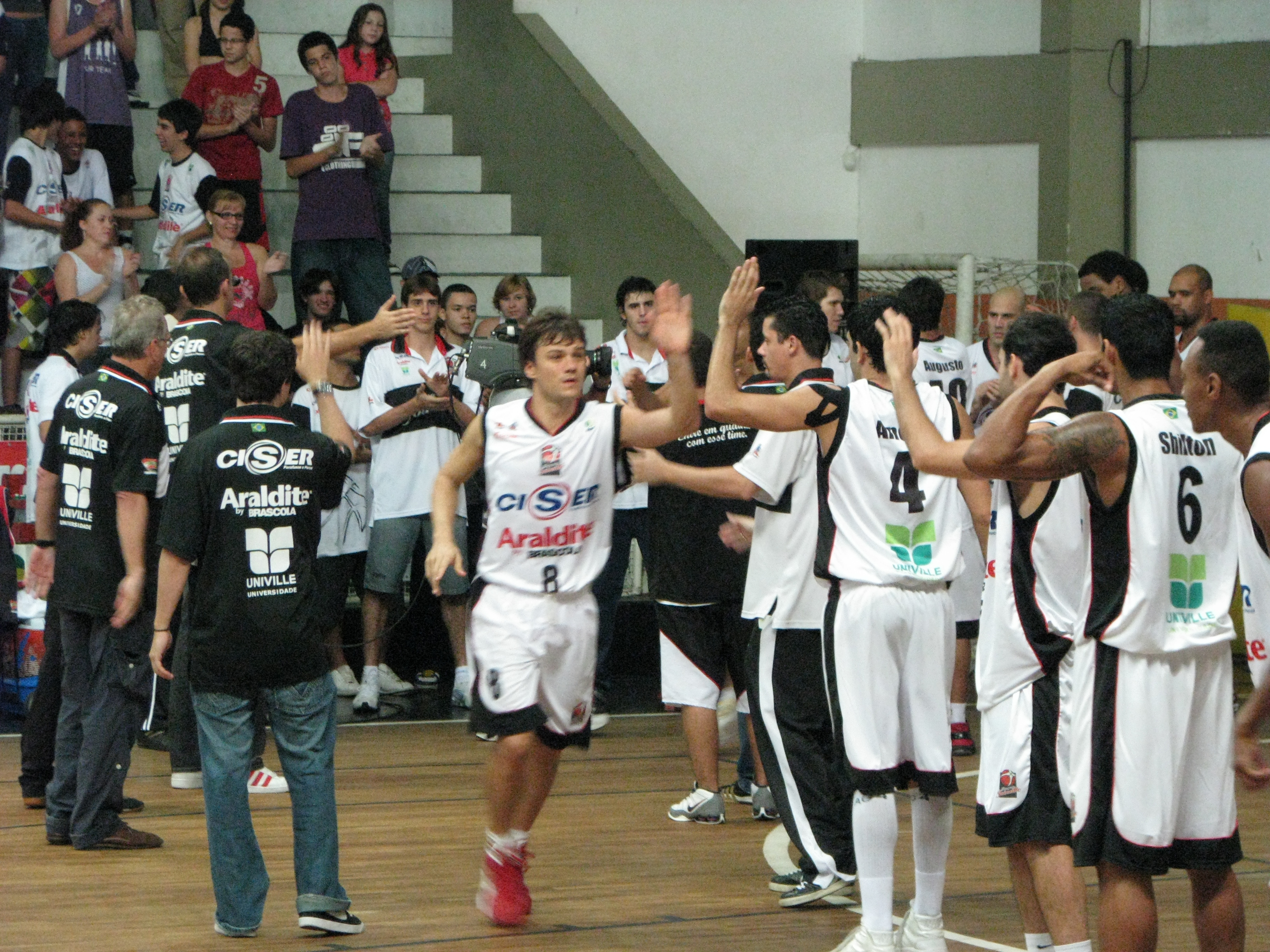
Espiga (center) being presented before a 2010 playoff game

Espiga was one of the founding players of the Joinville team, after the team lost its sponsor and was re-created a couple of years later. He is the oldest player on the squad, but is very loved by the local crowd and gets many minutes off the bench. On the first round of the 2010 playoffs, Espiga started on all 3 games, because starting point guard Manteguinha was injured.

== NBB Stats ==
=== Regular season ===
| Year | Team | GP | GS | MPG | FG% | 3P% | FT% | RPG | APG | SPG | BPG | PPG |
|---|---|---|---|---|---|---|---|---|---|---|---|---|
| 2008–09 | Joinville | 22 | 12 | 27.5 | .692 | .342 | .714 | 2.6 | 3.7 | N/A | 0.0 | 8.6 |
| 2009–10 | Joinville | 24 | 5 | 16.6 | .399 | .305 | .545 | 1.67 | 2.21 | 0.8 | 0.0 | 4.58 |

=== Playoffs ===
| Year | Team | GP | GS | MPG | FG% | 3P% | FT% | RPG | APG | SPG | BPG | PPG |
|---|---|---|---|---|---|---|---|---|---|---|---|---|
| 2008–09 | Joinville | 6 | 0 | 28.5 | .643 | .245 | 1.000 | 2.2 | 3.2 | N/A | 0.0 | 9.0 |
| 2009–10 | Joinville | 3 | 3 | 19.3 | .461 | .333 | .750 | 3.33 | 3.33 | 1.0 | 0 | 13.7 |
