= Maximiliano Stanic =

Argentine-Italian basketball player

Maxi Stanic
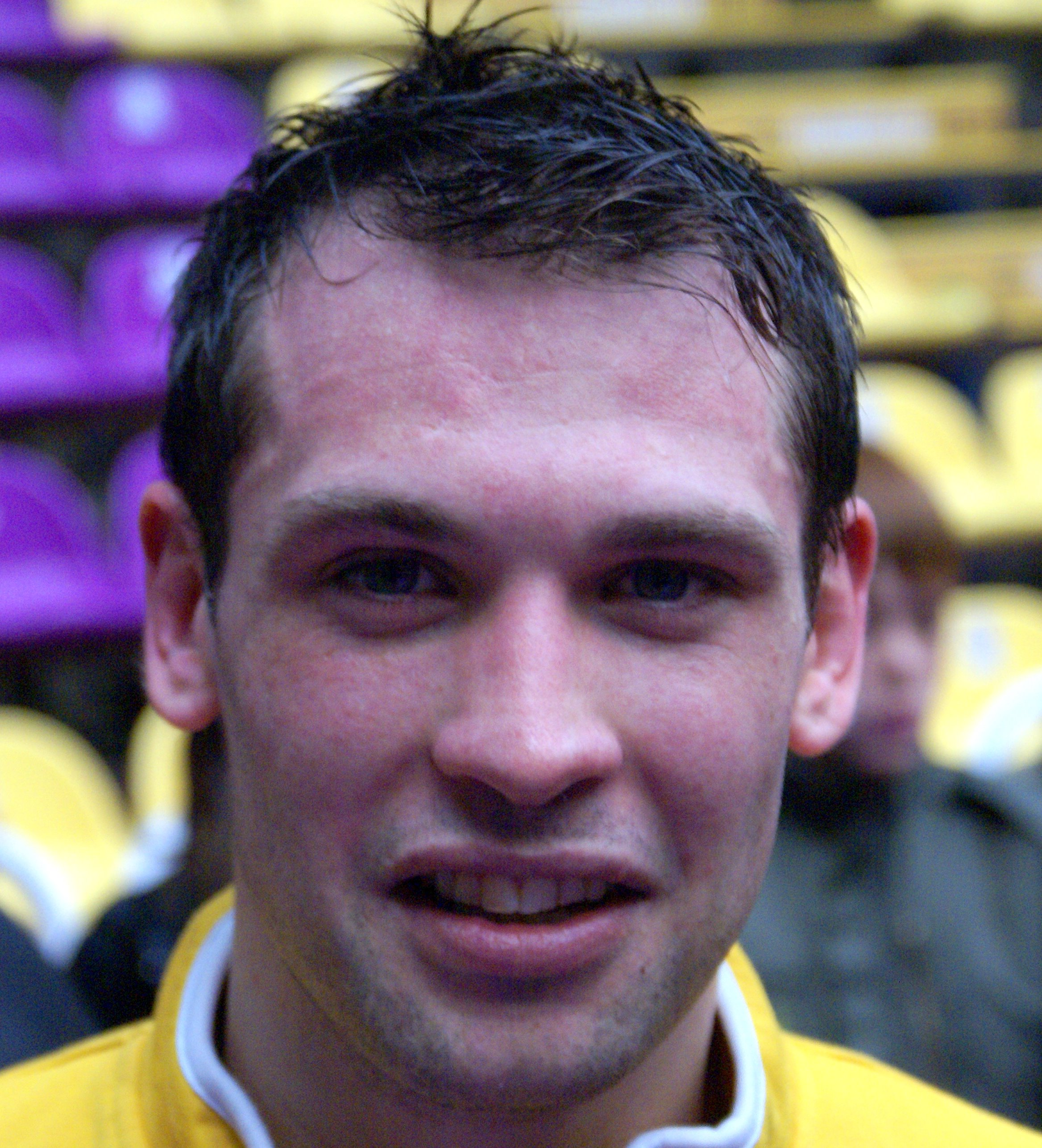
- Stanic in 2011.

Ciclista Olímpico
- Position: Point guard
- League: Liga Nacional de Básquet

Personal information
- Born: December 2, 1978 (age 47) Morón, Argentina
- Listed height: 1.78 m (5 ft 10 in)
- Listed weight: 82 kg (181 lb)

Career information
- Playing career: 1997–present

Career history
- 1997–2000: Pico FC
- 2000–2001: Regatas San Nicolás
- 2001–2002: Boca Juniors
- 2002–2003: Aurora Basket Jesi
- 2003–2006: Scafati Basket
- 2006–2007: Pallacanestro Pavia
- 2007–2008: EB Pau-Orthez
- 2008–2009: Victoria Libertas Pesaro
- 2009–2010: Obradoiro CAB
- 2001–2011: CB Valladolid
- 2011–2013: Boca Juniors
- 2013–2014: SE Palmeiras
- 2014: Club Morón
- 2014–2015: SE Palmeiras
- 2015–2019: Ciclista Olímpico
- 2019–present: Atenas Cordoba
Medals
Men's basketball
Representing Argentina
FIBA South American Championship
Gold medal – first place	2008 Puerto Montt

Maximiliano Ariel "Maxi" Stanic (born December 2, 1978, in Morón, Buenos Aires) is an Argentine-Italian professional basketball player who currently plays for Atenas Cordoba, from Argentina. He plays at the point guard position.

== Professional career ==
During his pro club career, Stanic has played in Argentina, Italy, France, Spain, and Brazil, where he played with SE Palmeiras.

== National team career ==
Stanic was a member of the Argentine national team that won the 2008 FIBA South American Championship.
