= Paul Crosby (basketball) =

American basketball player (1989–2019)

Personal information
- Born: January 21, 1989 Lansing, Michigan, U.S.
- Died: October 30, 2019 (aged 30) near Portage, Indiana, U.S.
- Listed height: 6 ft 8 in (2.03 m)
- Listed weight: 245 lb (111 kg)

Career information
- High school: Holt (Holt, Michigan)
- College: Navarro College (2007–2009); Mississippi Valley State (2010–2012)
- NBA draft: 2012: undrafted
- Playing career: 2012–2014
- Position: Power forward / center

Career history
- 2012: Montevideo
- 2013: Minas
- 2014: Laskar Dreya
- 2014: CD Talca

Career highlights
- AP honorable mention All-American (2012); SWAC Player of the Year (2012); 2× First-team All-SWAC (2011, 2012)

Paul James Crosby (January 21, 1989 – October 30, 2019) was an American basketball player. He was an All-American college player at Mississippi Valley State University.

== College ==
Crosby originally committed to the University of Toledo out of Holt High School in Holt, Michigan. However, he failed to qualify academically and instead ended up at Navarro College, a junior college in Texas. After junior college, he moved to Binghamton. But his time at Binghamton would be short-lived, as he was one of five players dismissed in the wake of the Binghamton University basketball scandal prior to the start of the 2009–10 season.

He landed at Mississippi Valley State after sitting out the 2010–11 season as a transfer student. He had a strong two years at MVSU, earning first team All-Southwest Athletic Conference (SWAC) honors both years. As a senior in 2011–12, Crosby averaged 13.1 points and 7.4 rebounds per game and was named SWAC Player of the Year. He led the Delta Devils to the 2012 NCAA Tournament and was named an honorable mention All-American by the Associated Press.

== Professional ==
After going undrafted in the 2012 NBA draft, Crosby signed with Montevideo in Uruguay. In December 2012, the league paused operations while investigating the shooting of two fans. Crosby took this opportunity to move to Minas in Brazil, where he completed the 2012–13 season.

On November 1, 2013, Crosby was drafted in the seventh round of the 2013 NBA Development League Draft by the Maine Red Claws. On November 4, 2013, his rights were traded to the Santa Cruz Warriors. On November 18, he was waived by the Warriors.

Crosby died in a truck crash near Portage, Indiana, on October 30, 2019.
