= Jamison Brewer =

American basketball player (born 1980)

Personal information
- Born: November 19, 1980 (age 45) East Point, Georgia, U.S.
- Listed height: 6 ft 4 in (1.93 m)
- Listed weight: 184 lb (83 kg)

Career information
- High school: Newport School (Silver Spring, Maryland); Tri-Cities (East Point, Georgia)
- College: Auburn (1999–2001)
- NBA draft: 2001: 2nd round, 40th overall pick
- Drafted by: Indiana Pacers
- Playing career: 2001–2011
- Position: Point guard
- Number: 2

Career history
- 2001–2004: Indiana Pacers
- 2004–2005: New York Knicks
- 2005–2006: Cibona Zagreb
- 2006–2007: Hollywood Fame
- 2007: Dexia Mons-Hainaut
- 2007: Bakersfield Jam
- 2009–2010: Pinheiros
- 2010–2011: Odesa
- 2011: Eisbären Bremerhaven

Career highlights
- Third-team All-SEC (2001)
- Stats at NBA.com
- Stats at Basketball Reference

Jamison Rudy Van Brewer (born November 19, 1980) is an American former professional basketball player. A point guard, he played four years in the National Basketball Association (NBA).

== College career ==
Brewer played two years of college basketball, attending Auburn University; in his last year, he averaged 8 points, 7 rebounds and 6 assists.

== Professional career ==
Brewer was selected by the Indiana Pacers in the second round (40th overall) in the 2001 NBA draft. During the basketball combine, Brewer set a still-standing record time of 9.65 seconds on a "lane agility" drill that involves a short sprint, lane slides, and reverse running.

During his three-year spell with the team, he only amassed 36 regular season games combined, spending most of the time in the injured reserve list, and averaging slightly more than two points. On December 20, 2003, he scored a career-high 12 points at the Minnesota Timberwolves, on 5-for-11 shooting (80–102 loss).

Brewer was signed as a restricted free agent by the New York Knicks in the 2004 off-season. After only 18 appearances, he was traded to the San Antonio Spurs in February 2005, being waived without any appearances. He was again signed by the Knicks prior to the start of 2005–06, being immediately cut.

Holding NBA career averages of 1.6 points, 1.0 assists and 0.9 rebounds, Brewer's final NBA game was played on February 11, 2005, in a 94 - 111 loss to the Boston Celtics where he played for four and half minutes and recorded no stats.

Brewer subsequently played – also shortly – with Croatia's KK Cibona (2006), Hollywood Fame (2006–07), Dexia Mons-Hainaut in Belgium (2007) and the NBA Development League's Bakersfield Jam (2007–08).

Late in 2009, Brewer was signed by Esporte Clube Pinheiros in São Paulo, Brazil, until the end of the Brazilian League season.

For the 2010–2011 season, Brewer signed with BC Odesa in the Ukrainian Basketball Super League, but he was released in January 2011.

In February 2011, Brewer signed with Eisbären Bremerhaven.

== Career statistics ==
Legend
| GP | Games played | GS | Games started | MPG | Minutes per game |
| FG% | Field goal percentage | 3P% | 3-point field goal percentage | FT% | Free throw percentage |
| RPG | Rebounds per game | APG | Assists per game | SPG | Steals per game |
| BPG | Blocks per game | PPG | Points per game | **Bold** | Career high |

=== College ===
| Year | Team | GP | GS | MPG | FG% | 3P% | FT% | RPG | APG | SPG | BPG | PPG |
|---|---|---|---|---|---|---|---|---|---|---|---|---|
| 1999–00 | Auburn | 26 | 1 | 12.0 | .407 | .200 | .520 | 1.7 | 1.9 | .6 | .0 | 2.3 |
| 2000–01 | Auburn | **32** | **32** | **32.3** | **.469** | **.227** | **.529** | **7.2** | **5.8** | **1.5** | **.1** | **8.4** |
| Career | | 58 | 33 | 23.2 | .456 | .220 | .527 | 4.7 | 4.1 | 1.1 | .1 | 5.7 |

=== NBA ===
==== Regular season ====
| Year | Team | GP | GS | MPG | FG% | 3P% | FT% | RPG | APG | SPG | BPG | PPG |
|---|---|---|---|---|---|---|---|---|---|---|---|---|
| 2001–02 | Indiana | 13 | 0 | 3.3 | .400 | .000 | – | .6 | .7 | .2 | .0 | .3 |
| 2002–03 | Indiana | 10 | 0 | 8.0 | **.529** | .000 | .444 | .9 | **1.8** | .2 | **.1** | 2.2 |
| 2003–04 | Indiana | 13 | **1** | **12.3** | .371 | **.357** | .167 | .8 | 1.3 | **.5** | .0 | **2.5** |
| 2004–05 | New York | **18** | 0 | 10.3 | .297 | .200 | **.462** | **1.2** | .7 | .4 | **.1** | 1.7 |
| Career | | 54 | 1 | 8.7 | .372 | .250 | .393 | .9 | 1.0 | .4 | .0 | 1.6 |

==== Playoffs ====
| Year | Team | GP | GS | MPG | FG% | 3P% | FT% | RPG | APG | SPG | BPG | PPG |
|---|---|---|---|---|---|---|---|---|---|---|---|---|
| 2002 | Indiana | 2 | 0 | 3.0 | .000 | – | .500 | 2.0 | .5 | .0 | .0 | .5 |
