= Clube Atlético Campestre de Assis Basket =

Assis Basket
- Leagues: Novo Basquete Brasil
- Founded: 2002
- History: 2002 - present
- Arena: Jairão Arena
- Location: Assis, Brazil
- Team colors: blue and white
- President: Joaquim Carvalho JR
- Head coach: Carlão
Home	Away

The Assis Basket is a male professional basketball team that is based in Brazil. The club has played in the top-tier level league in Brazil, the NBB.

== Honors and titles ==
=== Regional ===
- São Paulo State Championship
  - Runners-up (1): 2006
