= 2011–12 NBB season =

NBB 2011–12
- League: Novo Basquete Brasil
- Sport: Basketball
- Duration: November 19, 2011–June 2, 2012
- Teams: 15
- TV partners: SporTV; Rede Globo

NBB season
- Champions: Brasília
- Season MVP: (Brazil) Murilo Becker (São José)

NBB seasons
- ← 2010–11 2012–13 →

2011–2012 NBB season was the fourth season of Novo Basquete Brasil, the Brazilian basketball league. This tournament is organized entirely by the participating clubs. The NBB serves as a qualifying competition for international tournaments such as Liga Sudamericana and Torneo InterLigas. For this season the qualify for the FIBA Americas League came to be through the Liga Sudamericana.

The season started on November 19 and was disputed with 16 participating teams playing each other in round and second round in the regular season. At the end of two rounds the top four teams qualify for the quarterfinals of the playoffs automatically, while the teams finishing in the 5th and 12th place participated in the first round of the playoffs to determine the other four teams in the quarterfinals, best of five matches, advances to the next phase who win three games.

== Participating teams ==
- Franca
- Paulistano
- Araraquara
- Bauru
- São José
- Pinheiros
- Winner Limeira
- Liga Sorocabana
- Flamengo
- Tijuca
- Brasília
- Minas
- Uberlândia
- CETAF Vila Velha
- Joinville
- Vitória Basquete gave to dispute the season 2011/2012.

== Regular season ==
	Times	%	Pts	G	W	D	PM	PA	PA
1	São José	82,14	51	28	23	5	2424	2174	1,12
2	Pinheiros	75,00	49	28	21	7	2428	2173	1,12
3	Brasília	75,00	49	28	21	7	2432	2248	1,08
4	Flamengo	75,00	49	28	21	7	2469	2173	1,14
5	Uberlândia	64,29	46	28	18	10	2391	2257	1,06
6	Bauru	60,71	45	28	17	11	2307	2172	1,06
7	Paulistano	60,71	45	28	17	11	2286	2240	1,02
8	Joinville	50,00	42	28	14	14	2217	2232	0,99
9	Limeira	46,43	41	28	13	15	2278	2207	1,03
10	Franca	46,43	41	28	13	15	2339	2339	1,00
11	Liga Sorocabana	39,29	39	28	11	17	2128	2300	0,93
12	Tijuca	32,14	37	28	9	19	2200	2384	0,92
13	Minas	32,14	37	28	9	19	2179	2303	0,95
14	Araraquara	7,14	30	28	2	26	2077	2488	0,84
15	Vila Velha	3,57	29	28	1	27	1859	2324	0,80

% - percentage; Pts - points; G – games disputed; W - wins; D - defeats; PM - points made; PA - points against; PA - points average.

Classification

Qualified for the quarterfinals and for Liga Sudamericana.
Qualified for the first round of the playoffs. .

== Playoffs- first round ==
First round
5	Uberlândia	67	73	93	81	—	3
12	Tijuca	75	59	77	74	—	1
6	Bauru	82	83	84	—	—	3
11	Liga Sorocabana	76	71	74	—	—	0
7	Paulistano	89	68	69	—	—	0
10	Franca	91	75	77	—	—	3
8	Joinville	69	89	88	74	86	3
9	Limeira	77	84	69	102	78	2

=== Uberlândia (5) vs. (12) Tijuca ===
==== Game 1 ====
Sportv

April 14, 2012
18:00 UTC-03

Tijuca 75, Uberlândia 67
Scoring by quarter: 16-24, 16-13, 19-16, 24-14
Pts: Manteguinha 15; Rebs: Marcellus da Silva, Casé 5 Asts: Marcellus da Silva 4	Pts: Robby Collum 16; Rebs: Léo Waszkiewicz 10; Asts: Robby Collum 6
Tijuca led series, 1–0

Ginásio Álvaro Vieira Lima, Rio de Janeiro, Rio de Janeiro

==== Game 2 ====
Sportv

April 18, 2012
20:00 UTC-03

Uberlândia 73, Tijuca 59
Scoring by quarter: 18-10, 18-15, 12-21, 25-13
Pts: Robert Day 26; Rebs: Lucas Cipolini, Léo Waszkiewicz 5 Asts: Valter da Silva 7	Pts: Fernando Mineiro 14; Rebs: Diego Conceição, Fernando Coloneze 5 Asts: Gegê Chaia 4
Series tied, 1–1

Ginásio Homero Santos, Uberlândia, Minas Gerais

==== Game 3 ====
Sportv

April 20, 2012
19:00 UTC-03

Uberlândia 93, Tijuca 77
Scoring by quarter: 34-22, 17-23, 24-15, 18-17
Pts: Robert Day 26; Rebs: Léo Waszkiewicz 11; Asts: Robert Day, Robby Collum 4	Pts: Manteguinha 23; Rebs: Rodrigo Bahia, Diego Conceição 5 Asts: Gegê Chaia 2
Uberlândia led series, 2–1

Ginásio Homero Santos, Uberlândia, Minas Gerais

==== Game 4 ====
Sportv

April 23, 2012
19:00 UTC-03

Tijuca 74, Uberlândia 81
Scoring by quarter: 19-19, 18-21, 19-15, 18-26
Pts: Rodrigo Bahia 22; Rebs: Rodrigo Bahia 6 Asts: Manteguinha 4	Pts: Robby Collum 25; Rebs: Lucas Cipolini 6 Asts: Valter da Silva 7
Uberlândia wins series, 3–1

Ginásio Álvaro Vieira Lima, Rio de Janeiro, Rio de Janeiro

=== Bauru (6) vs. (11) Liga Sorocabana ===
==== Game 1 ====
Sportv

April 14, 2012
18:00 UTC-03

Liga Sorocabana 76, Bauru 82
Scoring by quarter: 18-23, 19-16, 19-17, 20-26
Pts: Kenny Dawkins 20; Rebs: Mineiro 10; Asts: Kenny Dawkins, César Araújo 2	Pts: Gaúcho 24; Rebs: Larry Taylor 9 Asts: Larry Taylor, Gaúcho 5
Bauru led series, 1–0

Ginásio Gualberto Moreira, Sorocaba, São Paulo

==== Game 2 ====
Sportv

April 18, 2012
20:00 UTC-03

Bauru 83, Liga Sorocabana 71
Scoring by quarter: 27-26, 21-15, 13-21, 22-9
Pts: Fernando Fischer 17; Rebs: Jeff Agba 10; Asts: Larry Taylor 7	Pts: Jeff Trepagnier 15; Rebs: Jeff Trepagnier, César Araújo 5 Asts: Kenny Dawkins 5
Bauru led series, 2–0

Ginásio Panela de Pressão, Bauru, São Paulo

==== Game 3 ====
Sportv

April 20, 2012
21:00 UTC-03

Bauru 84, Liga Sorocabana 74
Scoring by quarter: 24-28, 16-19, 30-9, 14-18
Pts: Jeff Agba 22; Rebs: Jeff Agba 9 Asts: Larry Taylor 5	Pts: Kenny Dawkins 24; Rebs: Mineiro 8 Asts: Kenny Dawkins 5
Bauru wins series, 3–0

Ginásio Panela de Pressão, Bauru, São Paulo

=== Paulistano (7) vs. (10) Franca ===
==== Game 1 ====
Sportv

April 14, 2012
18:00 UTC-03

Franca 91, Paulistano 89
Scoring by quarter: 22-22, 23-17, 27-28, 19-22
Pts: Kevin Sowell 23; Rebs: Eddie Basden 6 Asts: Kevin Sowell 8	Pts: Alex Oliveira 20; Rebs: Alex Oliveira 6 Asts: Elinho 10
Franca led series, 1–0

Ginásio Pedrocão, Franca, São Paulo

==== Game 2 ====
Sportv

April 17, 2012
21:00 UTC-03

Paulistano 68, Franca 75
Scoring by quarter: 12-18, 16-23, 17-19, 23-15
Pts: Betinho Duarte 15; Rebs: Felipe Ribeiro 8 Asts: Elinho 6	Pts: William Drudi 18; Rebs: William Drudi 7 Asts: Kevin Sowell 5
Franca led series, 2–0

Ginásio Antônio Prado Junior, São Paulo, São Paulo

==== Game 3 ====
Sportv

April 19, 2012
20:00 UTC-03

Paulistano 69, Franca 77
Scoring by quarter: 12-18, 16-19, 27-20, 14-20
Pts: Betinho Duarte 22; Rebs: Elinho 8 Asts: Betinho Duarte 3	Pts: William Drudi 21; Rebs: three players tied 7 Asts: Eddie Basden 3
Franca wins series, 3–0

Ginásio Antônio Prado Junior, São Paulo, São Paulo

=== Joinville (8) vs. (9) Limeira ===
==== Game 1 ====
Sportv

April 13, 2012
19:00 UTC-03

Limeira 77, Joinville 69
Scoring by quarter: 13-15, 24-24, 17-20, 23-10
Pts: Ronald Ramón, Vítor Benite 17; Rebs: Jonathan Luz 7 Asts: Ronald Ramón, Eric Tatu 5	Pts: Kojo Mensah 30; Rebs: Tiagão 7 Asts: André Góes 3
Limeira led series, 1–0

Ginásio Vô Lucato, Limeira, São Paulo

==== Game 2 ====
Sportv

April 17, 2012
20:00 UTC-03

Joinville 89, Limeira 84
Scoring by quarter: 34-25, 21-21, 17-12, 17-26
Pts: Rashad Bishop 29; Rebs: Rashad Bishop 15; Asts: Kojo Mensah, Luiz Felipe Lemes 4	Pts: Vítor Benite 22; Rebs: Rogério Klafke 6 Asts: Vítor Benite 2
Series tied, 1–1

Centreventos Cau Hansen, Joinville, Santa Catarina

==== Game 3 ====
Sportv

April 19, 2012
20:00 UTC-03

Joinville 88, Limeira 69
Scoring by quarter: 28-23, 24-11, 19-20, 17-15
Pts: Tiagão, Audrei Parizotto 15; Rebs: Kojo Mensah 7 Asts: Kojo Mensah 3	Pts: Diego Pinheiro 15; Rebs: Steven Toyloy 5 Asts: Eric Tatu, Diego Pinheiro 2
Joinville led series, 2–1

Centreventos Cau Hansen, Joinville, Santa Catarina

==== Game 4 ====
Sportv

April 22, 2012
12:00 UTC-03

Limeira 102, Joinville 74
Scoring by quarter: 29-12, 21-21, 25-21, 27-20
Pts: Vítor Benite 29; Rebs: Steven Toyloy 8 Asts: Eric Tatu, Vítor Benite 4	Pts: Kojo Mensah 22; Rebs: Tiagão 11; Asts: Kojo Mensah 7
Series tied, 2–2

Ginásio Vô Lucato, Limeira, São Paulo

==== Game 5 ====
Sportv

April 25, 2012
20:00 UTC-03

Joinville 86, Limeira 78
Scoring by quarter: 21-18, 19-14, 25-21, 21-25
Pts: Tiagão 17; Rebs: Tiagão, Rashad Bishop 7 Asts: Kojo Mensah 7	Pts: Ronald Ramón 23; Rebs: Rogério Klafke 13; Asts: Vítor Benite 2
Joinville wins series, 3–2

Centreventos Cau Hansen, Joinville, Santa Catarina

== Playoffs ==
Quarterfinals
1	São José	92	96	94	–	–	3
10	Franca	77	85	80	–	–	0
4	Flamengo	110	70	60	78	77	3
5	Uberlândia	108	63	77	87	62	2
3	Brasília	80	90	99	–	–	3
6	Bauru	76	78	91	–	–	0
2	Pinheiros	80	68	80	77	73	3
8	Joinville	96	74	69	71	63	2

Semifinals
1	São José	68	107	100	80	106	3
4	Flamengo	84	99	91	92	90	2
3	Brasília	90	65	76	105	81	3
2	Pinheiros	77	81	74	109	68	2

Final
1	São José	62
3	Brasília	78

== Quarterfinals ==
=== São José (1) vs. (10) Franca ===
==== Game 1 ====
Sportv

April 27, 2012
21:00 UTC-03

Franca 77, São José 92
Scoring by quarter: 18-25, 16-29, 20-20, 23-18
Pts: Eddie Basden 14; Rebs: Fernando Penna 5 Asts: Fernando Penna 5	Pts: Murilo Becker, Dedé Stefanelli 17; Rebs: Fúlvio de Assis, Dedé Stefanelli 7 Asts: Fúlvio de Assis 10
São José led series, 1–0

Ginásio Pedrocão, Franca, São Paulo

==== Game 2 ====
Sportv

May 1st, 2012
21:00 UTC-03

São José 96, Franca 85
Scoring by quarter: 22-28, 26-19, 26-17, 22-21
Pts: Murilo Becker 28; Rebs: Murilo Becker 8 Asts: Fúlvio de Assis 9	Pts: Kevin Sowell 23; Rebs: Ricardo Probst 12; Asts: Kevin Sowell 5
São José led series, 2–0

Ginásio Lineu de Moura, São José dos Campos, São Paulo

==== Game 3 ====
Sportv

May 3, 2012
20:00 UTC-03

São José 94, Franca 80
Scoring by quarter: 22-17, 30-16, 17-20, 25-27
Pts: Murilo Becker 29; Rebs: Murilo Becker 11; Asts: Fúlvio de Assis 10	Pts: Márcio Dornelles 20; Rebs: Vuk Ivanovic 9 Asts: Fernando Penna 6
São José wins series, 3–0

Ginásio Lineu de Moura, São José dos Campos, São Paulo

=== Pinheiros (2) vs. (8) Joinville ===
==== Game 1 ====
Sportv

April 27, 2012
20:00 UTC-03

Joinville 96, Pinheiros 80
Scoring by quarter: 29-13, 15-26, 22-15, 30-26
Pts: Kojo Mensah, Rashad Bishop 23; Rebs: Shilton dos Santos 10; Asts: Kojo Mensah 10	Pts: Marquinhos 21; Rebs: Renato Lamas, Bruno Fiorotto 5 Asts: Renato Lamas 3
Joinville led series, 1–0

Centreventos Cau Hansen, Joinville, Santa Catarina

==== Game 2 ====
Sportv

May 1st, 2012
19:00 UTC-03

Pinheiros 68, Joinville 74
Scoring by quarter: 14-17, 20-21, 15-16, 19-20
Pts: Marquinhos 15; Rebs: Rafael Mineiro 8 Asts: Juan Pablo Figueroa, Marquinhos 4	Pts: Kojo Mensah 19; Rebs: Shilton dos Santos 8 Asts: Kojo Mensah 4
Joinville led series, 2–0

Ginásio Henrique Villaboim, São Paulo, São Paulo

==== Game 3 ====
Sportv

May 3, 2012
20:00 UTC-03

Pinheiros 80, Joinville 69
Scoring by quarter: 11-16, 19-15, 23-23, 27-15
Pts: Bruno Fiorotto 15; Rebs: Olivinha 9 Asts: Marquinhos 7	Pts: Audrei Parizotto 20; Rebs: Shilton dos Santos 10; Asts: Kojo Mensah 6
Joinville led series, 2–1

Ginásio Henrique Villaboim, São Paulo, São Paulo

==== Game 4 ====
Sportv

May 8, 2012
19:00 UTC-03

Joinville 71, Pinheiros 77 (OT)
Scoring by quarter: 13-14, 14-20, 17-14, 19-15, Overtime: 8-14
Pts: Kojo Mensah 18; Rebs: Shilton dos Santos 10; Asts: Kojo Mensah 7	Pts: Shamell Stallworth 27; Rebs: Olivinha 10; Asts: Paulinho Boracini 2
Series tied, 2–2

Centreventos Cau Hansen, Joinville, Santa Catarina

==== Game 5 ====
Sportv

May 11, 2012
20:00 UTC-03

Pinheiros 73, Joinville 63
Scoring by quarter: 17-12, 15-13, 20-19, 21-19
Pts: Shamell Stallworth 17; Rebs: Marquinhos 10; Asts: Marquinhos 5	Pts: Shilton dos Santos 16; Rebs: Kojo Mensah 10; Asts: Kojo Mensah 5
Pinheiros wins series, 3–2

Ginásio Henrique Villaboim, São Paulo, São Paulo

=== Brasíla (3) vs. (6) Bauru ===
==== Game 1 ====
Sportv

May 4, 2012
21:00 UTC-03

Bauru 76, Brasília 80
Scoring by quarter: 17-21, 18-19, 17-21, 24-19
Pts: Larry Taylor 29; Rebs: Larry Taylor 6 Asts: Larry Taylor 5	Pts: Alex Garcia 20; Rebs: Lucas Tischer 9 Asts: three players tied 3
Brasília led series, 1–0

Ginásio Panela de Pressão, Bauru, São Paulo

==== Game 2 ====
Sportv

May 7, 2012
20:00 UTC-03

Brasília 90, Bauru 78
Scoring by quarter: 22-25, 23-16, 28-22, 17-15
Pts: Alex Garcia 24; Rebs: Alex Garcia 7 Asts: Alex Garcia, Nezinho dos Santos 5	Pts: Larry Taylor 19; Rebs: Larry Taylor 11; Asts: Larry Taylor 4
Brasília led series, 2–0

Ginásio Nilson Nelson, Brasília, Distrito Federal

==== Game 3 ====
Sportv

May 8, 2012
21:00 UTC-03

Brasília 99, Bauru 91
Scoring by quarter: 16-23, 33-15, 29-30, 21-23
Pts: Alex Garcia, Guilherme Giovannoni 19; Rebs: Guilherme Giovannoni, Márcio Cipriano 7 Asts: Nezinho dos Santos 8	Pts: Fernando Fischer 23; Rebs: Jeff Agba 13; Asts: Larry Taylor 7
Brasília wins series, 3–0

Ginásio Nilson Nelson, Brasília, Distrito Federal

=== Flamengo (4) vs. (5) Uberlândia ===
==== Game 1 ====
Sportv

April 28, 2012
18:00 UTC-03

Uberlândia 108, Flamengo 110 (OT)
Scoring by quarter: 21-22, 15-23, 31-24, 23-21, Overtime: 20-26
Pts: Robert Day 30; Rebs: Lucas Cipolini 11; Asts: Robert Day 5	Pts: David Jackson 29; Rebs: Federico Kammerichs 12; Asts: Hélio Lima 6
Flamengo led series, 1–0

Ginásio Homero Santos, Uberlândia, Minas Gerais

==== Game 2 ====
Sportv

May 1st, 2012
17:00 UTC-03

Flamengo 70, Uberlândia 63
Scoring by quarter: 16-18, 20-14, 20-13, 14-18
Pts: David Jackson 24; Rebs: Federico Kammerichs 11; Asts: Hélio Lima 5	Pts: Valter da Silva 18; Rebs: Lucas Cipolini 9 Asts: Robby Collum, Robert Day 5
Flamengo led series, 2–0

Ginásio Álvaro Vieira Lima, Rio de Janeiro, Rio de Janeiro

==== Game 3 ====
Sportv

May 4, 2012
19:00 UTC-03

Flamengo 60, Uberlândia 77
Scoring by quarter: 15-14, 14-16, 18-21, 13-26
Pts: Marcelinho Machado 11; Rebs: David Jackson 5 Asts: Marcelinho Machado, Teichmann 3	Pts: Robby Collum 25; Rebs: Lucas Cipolini 8 Asts: Valter da Silva 4
Flamengo led series, 2–1

Ginásio Álvaro Vieira Lima, Rio de Janeiro, Rio de Janeiro

==== Game 4 ====
Sportv

May 8, 2012
20:00 UTC-03

Uberlândia 87, Flamengo 78
Scoring by quarter: 20-18, 23-28, 16-11, 28-21
Pts: Lucas Cipolini 22; Rebs: Lucas Cipolini 10; Asts: Robby Collum 6	Pts: Marcelinho Machado 19; Rebs: Caio Torres 8 Asts: Hélio Lima 5
Series tied, 2–2

Ginásio Homero Santos, Uberlândia, Minas Gerais

==== Game 5 ====
Sportv

May 11, 2012
19:00 UTC-03

Flamengo 77, Uberlândia 62
Scoring by quarter: 18-19, 20-9, 29-21, 10-13
Pts: Caio Torres 22; Rebs: Caio Torres 9 Asts: Hélio Lima 5	Pts: Robert Day 17; Rebs: Lucas Cipolini 7 Asts: Valter da Silva 4
Flamengo wins series, 3–2

Ginásio Álvaro Vieira Lima, Rio de Janeiro, Rio de Janeiro

== Semifinals ==
=== São José (1) vs. (4) Flamengo ===
==== Game 1 ====
Sportv

May 15, 2012
21:00 UTC-03

Flamengo 84, São José 68
Scoring by quarter: 27-18, 14-15, 26-18, 17-17
Pts: David Jackson 17; Rebs: David Jackson 9 Asts: Marcelinho Machado 4	Pts: Dedé Stefanelli 17; Rebs: Murilo Becker 8 Asts: Andre Laws 3
Flamengo led series, 1–0

Ginásio Álvaro Vieira Lima, Rio de Janeiro, Rio de Janeiro

==== Game 2 ====
Sportv

May 18, 2012
19:00 UTC-03

São José 107, Flamengo 99 (OT)
Scoring by quarter: 24-24, 14-20, 22-24, 28-20, Overtime: 19-11
Pts: Fúlvio de Assis 29; Rebs: Murilo Becker 13; Asts: Fúlvio de Assis 6	Pts: David Jackson, Marcelinho Machado 25; Rebs: Federico Kammerichs 11; Asts: David Jackson, Federico Kammerichs 6
Series tied, 1–1

Ginásio Lineu de Moura, São José dos Campos, São Paulo

==== Game 3 ====
Sportv

May 20, 2012
21:15 UTC-03

São José 100, Flamengo 91
Scoring by quarter: 26-23, 29-19, 27-23, 18-26
Pts: Murilo Becker 24; Rebs: Murilo Becker 8 Asts: Fúlvio de Assis 13	Pts: Marcelinho Machado 27; Rebs: Federico Kammerichs 7 Asts: Marcelinho Machado 4
São José led series, 2–1

Ginásio Lineu de Moura, São José dos Campos, São Paulo

==== Game 4 ====
Sportv

May 25, 2012
21:00 UTC-03

Flamengo 92, São José 80
Scoring by quarter: 24-20, 21-26, 25-16, 22-18
Pts: Marcelinho Machado 19; Rebs: Federico Kammerichs 5 Asts: Marcelinho Machado 5	Pts: Dedé Stefanelli 17; Rebs: Murilo Becker 6 Asts: Fúlvio de Assis 5
Series tied, 2–2

Ginásio Álvaro Vieira Lima, Rio de Janeiro, Rio de Janeiro

==== Game 5 ====
Sportv

May 27, 2012
18:00 UTC-03

São José 106, Flamengo 90
Scoring by quarter: 25-23, 29-24, 24-13, 28-30
Pts: Murilo Becker 32; Rebs: Murilo Becker 7 Asts: Fúlvio de Assis 8	Pts: Marcelinho Machado 28; Rebs: Caio Torres 6 Asts: David Jackson 6
São José wins series, 3–2

Ginásio Lineu de Moura, São José dos Campos, São Paulo

=== Pinheiros (2) vs. (3) Brasília ===
==== Game 1 ====
Sportv

May 18, 2012
20:30 UTC-03

Brasília 90, Pinheiros 77
Scoring by quarter: 16-18, 26-20, 23-24, 26-15
Pts: Nezinho dos Santos 22; Rebs: Guilherme Giovannoni 7 Asts: Guilherme Giovannoni 7	Pts: Olivinha 21; Rebs: Olivinha 12; Asts: Shamell Stallworth 4
Brasília led series, 1–0

Ginásio Nilson Nelson, Brasília, Distrito Federal

==== Game 2 ====
Sportv

May 20, 2012
19:15 UTC-03

Pinheiros 81, Brasília 65
Scoring by quarter: 26-13, 15-17, 20-18, 20-17
Pts: Juan Pablo Figueroa 20; Rebs: Marquinhos, Olivinha 7 Asts: Marquinhos 9	Pts: Guilherme Giovannoni 20; Rebs: Ronald Reis 4 Asts: Nezinho dos Santos 4
Series tied, 1–1

Ginásio Henrique Villaboim, São Paulo, São Paulo

==== Game 3 ====
Sportv

May 22, 2012
21:00 UTC-03

Pinheiros 74, Brasília 76
Scoring by quarter: 24-21, 12-19, 13-18, 25-18
Pts: Marquinhos 21; Rebs: Marquinhos, Olivinha 6 Asts: Juan Pablo Figueroa, Marquinhos 4	Pts: Guilherme Giovannoni 21; Rebs: Guilherme Giovannoni 8 Asts: Guilherme Giovannoni 4
Brasília led series, 2–1

Ginásio Henrique Villaboim, São Paulo, São Paulo

==== Game 4 ====
Sportv

May 25, 2012
18:45 UTC-03

Brasília 105, Pinheiros 109 (OT)
Scoring by quarter: 11-22, 21-12, 20-24, 29-23, Overtime: 24-28
Pts: Alex Garcia 27; Rebs: Guilherme Giovannoni 12; Asts: Nezinho dos Santos, Alex Garcia 4	Pts: Marquinhos 26; Rebs: Olivinha 20; Asts: Marquinhos 7
Series tied, 2–2

Ginásio Nilson Nelson, Brasília, Distrito Federal

==== Game 5 ====
Sportv

May 27, 2012
14:00 UTC-03

Pinheiros 68, Brasília 81
Scoring by quarter: 15-30, 21-10, 12-17, 20-24
Pts: Paulinho Boracini 16; Rebs: Olivinha 7 Asts: Juan Pablo Figueroa 4	Pts: Nezinho dos Santos 20; Rebs: Márcio Cipriano 7 Asts: Nezinho dos Santos 8
Brasília wins series, 3–2

Ginásio Henrique Villaboim, São Paulo, São Paulo

== Final ==
=== São José (1) vs. (3) Brasília ===
Sportv

June 2, 2012
10:00 UTC-03

São José 62, Brasília 78
Scoring by quarter: 10-18, 19-15, 10-20, 23-25
Pts: Murilo Becker 20; Rebs: Murilo Becker 14; Asts: Fúlvio de Assis 3	Pts: Guilherme Giovannoni 26; Rebs: Alex Garcia 11; Asts: Nezinho dos Santos 6
Brasília wins NBB Final Game

Ginásio Municipal Professor Hugo Ramos, Mogi das Cruzes, São Paulo

== Awards ==
- MVP - Murilo Becker (São José)
- Finals MVP - Guilherme Giovannoni (Brasília)
- Sixth Player - Paulinho Boracini (Pinheiros)
- Best Defender - Alex Garcia (Brasília)
- Revelation - Gui Deodato (Bauru)
- Most Improved Player - Gui Deodato (Bauru)
- Coach - Régis Marrelli (São José)

== All-Team ==
Position	Player	Team
PG	Fúlvio de Assis	São José
SG	Alex Garcia	Brasília
SF	Marquinhos	Pinheiros
PF	Guilherme Giovannoni	Brasília
C	Murilo Becker	São José
