= 2010–11 NBB season =

NBB 2010–11
- League: Novo Basquete Brasil
- Sport: Basketball
- Duration: October 29, 2010–May 24, 2011
- Teams: 15
- TV partner: SporTV Rede Globo

NBB season
- Champions: Brasília
- Season MVP: (Brazil) Guilherme Giovannoni (Brasília)

NBB seasons
- ← 2009–10 2011–12 →

The 2010–11 NBB season was the third season of Novo Basquete Brasil, the Brazilian basketball league. It started on October 29, 2010, and was disputed by fourteen teams playing each other in round and runoff in the regular season. The NBB serves as a qualifying competition for international tournaments such as FIBA Americas League, Liga Sudamericana and Torneo InterLigas. As in the second edition, in the third edition of NBB, also named NBB 3, At the end of the regular season the first four teams qualify for the quarterfinals of the playoffs automatically now the team who finish between 5° and 12° positions will participate in the first round of the playoffs o define the other four teams in the quarterfinals.

== Participating teams ==
- Franca
- Paulistano
- Araraquara
- Assis Basket
- Bauru
- São José
- Pinheiros
- Winner Limeira
- Flamengo
- Vitória Basquete/CECRE
- CETAF Vila Velha
- Brasília
- Joinville
- Minas
- Uberlândia

== Regular season ==
Classification
Team		Pts	G	W	D	%	A
1	Franca	48	28	20	8	85,71	1,098
2	Pinheiros	48	28	20	8	85,71	1,093
3	Brasília	48	28	20	8	85,71	1,129
4	Flamengo	48	28	20	8	85,71	1,120
5	Bauru	47	28	19	9	83,93	1,113
6	Uberlândia	47	28	19	9	83,93	1,092
7	Joinville	45	28	17	11	80,36	1,073
8	São José	43	28	15	13	76,79	1,059
9	Limeira	40	28	12	16	71,43	0,951
10	Minas	38*	28	13	15	67,86	0,951
11	Araraquara	37	28	9	19	66,07	0,926
12	Paulistano	36	28	8	20	64,29	0,875
13	Vitória	35	28	7	21	62,50	0,841
14	Vila Velha	34	28	6	22	60,71	0,841
15	Assis	33	28	5	23	58,93	0,900
* O Minas lost 3 (three) points according to punishment imposed by STJD.
Pts - points; G – games disputed; W - wins; D - defeats; % - percentage; A - average

Classification

Qualified for the playoffs and for FIBA Americas League.
Qualified for the playoffs and for Liga Sudamericana.
Qualified for the first round of the playoffs and for Liga Sudamericana.
Qualified for the first round of the playoffs.

== Playoffs- first round ==
First round
5	Bauru	86	90	92	—	—	3
12	Paulistano	62	69	77	—	—	0
6	Uberlândia	90	89	74	—	—	3
11	Araraquara	63	61	65	—	—	0
7	Joinville	81	84	78	85	71	3
10	Minas	83	77	80	74	66	2
8	São José	76	92	72	84	81	3
9	Limeira	90	77	60	95	76	2

=== Bauru (5) vs. (12) Paulistano ===
==== Game 1 ====
Sportv

April 8, 2011
20:00 UTC-03

Paulistano 62, Bauru 86
Scoring by quarter: 8-23, 15-18, 16-25, 23-17
Pts: Pedro Lima 20; Rebs: Felipe Ribeiro 7 Asts: Pedro Lima, Vinícius Gobor 2	Pts: Fernando Fisher 20; Rebs: Jeff Agba 7 Asts: Larry Taylor 11
Bauru led series, 1–0

Ginásio Antonio Prado Junior, São Paulo, São Paulo

==== Game 2 ====
Sportv

April 11, 2011
19:00 UTC-03

Bauru 90, Paulistano 69
Scoring by quarter: 26-25, 23-14, 17-11, 24-19
Pts: Larry Taylor 33; Rebs: Douglas Nunes, Pilar 7 Asts: Larry Taylor 6	Pts: Betinho Duarte 18; Rebs: three players tied 4 Asts: Thiago 2
Bauru led series, 2–0

Assoc. Luso Brasileira de Bauru, Bauru, São Paulo

==== Game 3 ====
Sportv

April 13, 2011
20:00 UTC-03

Bauru 92, Paulistano 66
Scoring by quarter: 29-13, 17-17, 24-9, 22-27
Pts: Alex Oliveira 26; Rebs: Jeff Agba 11; Asts: Larry Taylor 6	Pts: Felipe Ribeiro 22; Rebs: Felipe Ribeiro, Erick Rodrigues 6 Asts: Luiz Felipe Lemes 3
Bauru wins series, 3–0

Assoc. Luso Brasileira de Bauru, Bauru, São Paulo

=== Uberlândia (6) vs. (11) Araraquara ===
==== Game 1 ====
Sportv

April 10, 2011
20:00 UTC-03

Araraquara 63, Uberlândia 90
Scoring by quarter: 11-26, 18-20, 14-19, 20-25
Pts: Luisinho 13; Rebs: Deivisson Costa 6 Asts: Mark Borders 5	Pts: Robert Day 31; Rebs: Valter da Silva, Lucas Cipolini 7 Asts: Valter da Silva 14
Uberlândia led series, 1–0

Ginásio Decimo Chiozzini, Araraquara, São Paulo

==== Game 2 ====
Sportv

April 12, 2011
19:00 UTC-03

Uberlândia 89, Araraquara 61
Scoring by quarter: 27-22, 14-14, 19-12, 29-13
Pts: Robert Day 31; Rebs: Lucas Cipolini 7 Asts: Valter da Silva, Robby Collum 4	Pts: Mark Borders, Daniel Zilmer 15; Rebs: Chico Delben 7 Asts: Chico Delben 4
Uberlândia led series, 2–0

Ginásio Tancredo Neves, Uberlândia, Minas Gerais

==== Game 3 ====
Sportv

April 14, 2011
20:00 UTC-03

Uberlândia 74, Araraquara 65
Scoring by quarter: 19-15, 18-24, 27-10, 10-16
Pts: Lucas Cipolini 17; Rebs: Lucas Cipolini 8 Asts: Valter da Silva 8	Pts: Arlindo Neto 16; Rebs: Fernando Mineiro 9 Asts: Fernando Mineiro 2
Uberlândia wins series, 3–0

Ginásio Tancredo Neves, Uberlândia, Minas Gerais

=== Joinville (7) vs. (10) Minas ===
==== Game 1 ====
Sportv

April 9, 2011
12:00 UTC-03

Minas 83, Joinville 81
Scoring by quarter: 27-20, 20-12, 20-32, 16-17
Pts: Bernard Robinson 31; Rebs: Leandro Azevedo 6 Asts: four players tied 4	Pts: Manteguinha 23; Rebs: Shilton dos Santos 8 Asts: Manteguinha 8
Minas led series, 1–0

Arena Vivo, Belo Horizonte, Minas Gerais

==== Game 2 ====
Sportv

April 12, 2011
20:00 UTC-03

Joinville 84, Minas 77
Scoring by quarter: 17-11, 16-16, 27-24, 24-26
Pts: Manteguinha 24; Rebs: Shilton dos Santos 12; Asts: Paulinho Boracini 2	Pts: Michel Nascimento 18; Rebs: Michel Nascimento 11; Asts: Facundo Sucatzky 2
Series tied, 1–1

Centreventos Cau Hansen, Joinville, Santa Catarina

==== Game 3 ====
Sportv

April 14, 2011
12:00 UTC-03

Joinville 78, Minas 80
Scoring by quarter: 17-15, 26-24, 19-22, 16-19
Pts: Manteguinha 19; Rebs: Shilton dos Santos 13; Asts: Shilton dos Santos 3	Pts: Bernard Robinson 36; Rebs: Michel Nascimento 12; Asts: four players tied 1
Minas led series, 2–1

Centreventos Cau Hansen, Joinville, Santa Catarina

==== Game 4 ====
Sportv

April 17, 2011
11:00 UTC-03

Minas 74, Joinville 85
Scoring by quarter: 19-28, 6-26, 22-16, 27-15
Pts: Brett Winkelman 17; Rebs: Bernard Robinson 6 Asts: Facundo Sucatzky 7	Pts: Luis Gruber 20; Rebs: Shilton dos Santos 11; Asts: Paulinho Boracini 6
Series tied, 2–2

Arena Vivo, Belo Horizonte, Minas Gerais

==== Game 5 ====
Sportv

April 20, 2011
20:00 UTC-03

Joinville 71, Minas 66
Scoring by quarter: 13-17, 15-16, 19-11, 24-22
Pts: Manteguinha 19; Rebs: Shilton dos Santos 11; Asts: Manteguinha 4	Pts: Facundo Sucatzky 17; Rebs: Brett Winkelman 7 Asts: Facundo Sucatzky, Michel Nascimento 1
Joinville wins series, 3–2

Centreventos Cau Hansen, Joinville, Santa Catarina

=== São José (8) vs. (9) Limeira ===
==== Game 1 ====
Sportv

April 7, 2011
20:00 UTC-03

Limeira 90, São José 76
Scoring by quarter: 25-19, 19-12, 27-24, 19-21
Pts: Ronald Ramón 25; Rebs: Jonathan Luz 5 Asts: Jonathan Luz 4	Pts: Fúlvio de Assis 15; Rebs: Murilo Becker, Joseph Shipp 5 Asts: Fúlvio de Assis 5
Limeira led series, 1–0

Ginásio Vô Lucato, Limeira, São Paulo

==== Game 2 ====
Sportv

April 10, 2011
12:00 UTC-03

São José 92, Limeira 77
Scoring by quarter: 26-20, 13-20, 35-14, 18-23
Pts: Renato Lamas 22; Rebs: Joseph Shipp 9 Asts: Fúlvio de Assis 8	Pts: Ronald Ramón 22; Rebs: Eric Tatu 7 Asts: Diego Pinheiro 6
Series tied, 1–1

Ginásio Lineu de Moura, São José dos Campos, São Paulo

==== Game 3 ====
Sportv

April 12, 2011
20:00 UTC-03

São José 72, Limeira 60
Scoring by quarter: 17-15, 26-24, 19-22, 16-19
Pts: Renato Lamas 20; Rebs: Rafael Mineiro 9 Asts: Fúlvio de Assis 7	Pts: Diego Pinheiro 16; Rebs: André Bambu 4 Asts: Ronald Ramón, Diego Pinheiro 2
São José led series, 2–1

Ginásio Lineu de Moura, São José dos Campos, São Paulo

==== Game 4 ====
Sportv

April 17, 2011
12:00 UTC-03

Limeira 95, São José 84
Scoring by quarter: 25-17, 30-24, 19-22, 21-21
Pts: Ronald Ramón 23; Rebs: Diego Pinheiro 7 Asts: Eric Tatu 5	Pts: Murilo Becker 33; Rebs: Murilo Becker 15; Asts: four players tied 3
Series tied, 2–2

Ginásio Vô Lucato, Limeira, São Paulo

==== Game 5 ====
Sportv

April 20, 2011
20:00 UTC-03

São José 81, Limeira 76
Scoring by quarter: 28-23, 19-15, 9-16, 25-22
Pts: Renato Lamas 20; Rebs: Murilo Becker 6 Asts: Fúlvio de Assis 7	Pts: Eric Tatu, Diego Pinheiro 13; Rebs: Daniel Alemão 10; Asts: Jonathan Luz 5
São José wins series, 3–2

Ginásio Lineu de Moura, São José dos Campos, São Paulo

== Playoffs ==
Quarterfinals
1	Franca	86	79	83	-	-	3
8	São José	79	78	62	-	-	0
4	Flamengo	85	79	79	82	-	3
5	Bauru	87	71	73	79	-	1
3	Brasília	91	109	84	68	91	3
6	Uberlândia	95	73	72	80	74	2
2	Pinheiros	72	84	103	71	93	3
7	Joinville	66	70	105	76	82	2

Semifinals
1	Franca	73	94	91	-	-	3
4	Flamengo	69	86	78	-	-	0
3	Brasília	84	90	92	99	-	3
2	Pinheiros	80	89	99	93	-	1

Finals
1	Franca	72	75	93	68	-	1
3	Brasília	92	80	92	77	-	3

== Quarterfinals ==
=== Franca (1) vs. (8) São José ===
==== Game 1 ====
Sportv

April 24, 2011
11:00 UTC-03

São José 79, Franca 86
Scoring by quarter: 22-20, 13-17, 21-27, 23-22
Pts: Murilo Becker 23; Rebs: Murilo Becker 8 Asts: Fúlvio de Assis 12	Pts: Márcio Dornelles 24; Rebs: Ricardo Probst 9 Asts: Hélio Rubens Filho 5
Franca led series, 1–0

Ginásio Lineu de Moura, São José dos Campos, São Paulo

==== Game 2 ====
Sportv

April 26, 2011
19:00 UTC-03

Franca 79, São José 78
Scoring by quarter: 26-24, 11-15, 22-14, 20-25
Pts: William Drudi 17; Rebs: William Drudi 10; Asts: Márcio Dornelles 4	Pts: Murilo Becker 31; Rebs: Murilo Becker 17; Asts: Fúlvio de Assis 6
Franca led series, 2–0

Ginásio Pedrocão, Franca, São Paulo

==== Game 3 ====
Sportv

April 27, 2011
20:00 UTC-03

Franca 83, São José 62
Scoring by quarter: 23-18, 21-24, 29-17, 10-13
Pts: Marques Lewis 13; Rebs: Marques Lewis 7 Asts: Vítor Benite 6	Pts: three players tied 13; Rebs: Rafael Mineiro 6 Asts: Fúlvio de Assis, Renato Lamas 4
Franca wins series, 3–0

Ginásio Pedrocão, Franca, São Paulo

=== Pinheiros (2) vs. (7) Joinville ===
==== Game 1 ====
Sportv

April 23, 2011
20:30 UTC-03

Joinville 66, Pinheiros 72
Scoring by quarter: 13-13, 25-21, 16-19, 12-19
Pts: Paulinho Boracini 12; Rebs: Shilton dos Santos 11; Asts: Manteguinha 3	Pts: Shamell Stallworth 22; Rebs: Bruno Fiorotto 10; Asts: Shamell Stallworth, Marquinhos 3
Pinheiros led series, 1–0

Centreventos Cau Hansen, Joinville, Santa Catarina

==== Game 2 ====
Sportv

April 26, 2011
20:00 UTC-03

Pinheiros 84, Joinville 70
Scoring by quarter: 24-19, 18-15, 19-17, 23-19
Pts: Shamell Stallworth, Marquinhos 17; Rebs: Morro 8 Asts: Juan Pablo Figueroa 5	Pts: Paulinho Boracini 16; Rebs: Shilton dos Santos 8 Asts: Audrei Parizotto 3
Pinheiros led series, 2–0

Ginásio Henrique Villaboim, São Paulo, São Paulo

==== Game 3 ====
Sportv

April 27, 2011
20:00 UTC-03

Pinheiros 103, Joinville 105
Scoring by quarter: 16-26, 19-24, 36-23, 19-17
Pts: Marquinhos 43; Rebs: Morro 8 Asts: Juan Pablo Figueroa 7	Pts: Manteguinha 21; Rebs: Shilton dos Santos 11; Asts: Paulinho Boracini 5
Pinheiros led series, 2–1

Ginásio Henrique Villaboim, São Paulo, São Paulo

==== Game 4 ====
Sportv

April 29, 2011
20:00 UTC-03

Joinville 76, Pinheiros 71
Scoring by quarter: 20-15, 13-19, 24-19, 19-18
Pts: Manteguinha 18; Rebs: Tiago Valentin 11; Asts: Tiago Valentin 4	Pts: Shamell Stallworth 20; Rebs: Olivinha 10; Asts: Morro 1
Series tied, 2–2

Centreventos Cau Hansen, Joinville, Santa Catarina

==== Game 5 ====
Sportv

May 1st, 2011
11:00 UTC-03

Pinheiros 93, Joinville 82
Scoring by quarter: 17-19, 23-17, 28-23, 25-23
Pts: Marquinhos 31; Rebs: Olivinha 10; Asts: Marquinhos 4	Pts: Manteguinha 29; Rebs: Shilton dos Santos 8 Asts: Manteguinha 4
Pinheiros wins series, 3–2

Ginásio Henrique Villaboim, São Paulo, São Paulo

=== Brasília (3) vs. (6) Uberlândia ===
==== Game 1 ====
Sportv

April 23, 2011
18:30 UTC-03

Uberlândia 96, Brasília 91
Scoring by quarter: 25-29, 20-18, 22-20, 29-24
Pts: Valter da Silva, Robert Day 27; Rebs: Lucas Cipolini 7 Asts: Valter da Silva, Robert Day 4	Pts: Nezinho dos Santos 24; Rebs: Alírio de Souza 5 Asts: Alex Garcia 8
Uberlândia led series, 1–0

Ginásio Tancredo Neves, Uberlândia, Minas Gerais

==== Game 2 ====
Sportv

April 26, 2011
20:00 UTC-03

Brasília 109, Uberlândia 73
Scoring by quarter: 31-15, 21-14, 32-22, 25-21
Pts: Guilherme Giovannoni 23; Rebs: Guilherme Giovannoni 10; Asts: Nezinho dos Santos 9	Pts: Valter da Silva 14; Rebs: Hátila Passos 10; Asts: Valter da Silva, Soró 2
Series tied, 1-1

Ginásio Nilson Nelson, Brasília, Distrito Federal

==== Game 3 ====
Sportv

April 27, 2011
20:00 UTC-03

Brasília 84, Uberlândia 72
Scoring by quarter: 24-20, 18-11, 21-18, 21-23
Pts: Arthur Belchor Silva 21; Rebs: Guilherme Giovannoni 8 Asts: Nezinho dos Santos 10	Pts: Robert Day 16; Rebs: Hátila Passos 9 Asts: Valter da Silva, Robby Collum 4
Brasília led series, 2–1

Ginásio Nilson Nelson, Brasília, Distrito Federal

==== Game 4 ====
Sportv

April 29, 2011
20:00 UTC-03

Uberlândia 80, Brasília 68
Scoring by quarter: 25-20, 15-16, 20-17, 20-15
Pts: Robert Day 27; Rebs: Robert Day 10; Asts: Valter da Silva 7	Pts: Guilherme Giovannoni 13; Rebs: Márcio Cipriano 8 Asts: Nezinho dos Santos 6
Series tied, 2–2

Ginásio Tancredo Neves, Uberlândia, Minas Gerais

==== Game 5 ====
Sportv

May 2, 2011
20:00 UTC-03

Brasília 91, Uberlândia 74
Scoring by quarter: 19-21, 32-20, 17-23, 23-10
Pts: Guilherme Giovannoni 29; Rebs: Márcio Cipriano 9 Asts: Nezinho dos Santos, Alex Garcia 4	Pts: Robert Day 23; Rebs: Robert Day 7 Asts: Robby Collum 6
Brasília wins series, 3–2

Ginásio Nilson Nelson, Brasília, Distrito Federal

=== Flamengo (4) vs. (5) Bauru ===
==== Game 1 ====
Sportv

April 24, 2011
11:00 UTC-03

Bauru 87, Flamengo 85
Scoring by quarter: 19-22, 19-7, 29-23, 20-33
Pts: Jeff Agba, Fernando Fischer 16; Rebs: Jeff Agba 9 Asts: Larry Taylor 7	Pts: Marcelinho Machado 30; Rebs: Guilherme Teichmann 5 Asts: Hélio Lima 4
Bauru led series, 1–0

Assoc. Luso Brasileira de Bauru, Bauru, São Paulo

==== Game 2 ====
Sportv

April 26, 2011
20:00 UTC-03

Flamengo 79, Bauru 71
Scoring by quarter: 30-12, 21-16, 22-24, 6-19
Pts: Marcelinho Machado 26; Rebs: Jefferson William 8 Asts: Hélio Lima 3	Pts: Jeff Agba 19; Rebs: Jeff Agba 14; Asts: Larry Taylor 8
Series tied, 1–1

HSBC Arena, Rio de Janeiro, Rio de Janeiro

==== Game 3 ====
Sportv

April 27, 2011
20:00 UTC-03

Flamengo 79, Bauru 73
Scoring by quarter: 14-16, 20-16, 26-20, 19-21
Pts: Hélio Lima 21; Rebs: Marcelinho Machado 8 Asts: Guilherme Teichmann 4	Pts: Fernando Fischer 24; Rebs: Douglas Nunes 9 Asts: Pilar, Larry Taylor 1
Flamengo led series, 2–1

HSBC Arena, Rio de Janeiro, Rio de Janeiro

==== Game 4 ====
Sportv

April 29, 2011
20:30 UTC-03

Bauru 79, Flamengo 82
Scoring by quarter: 27-15, 14-21, 16-13, 22-33
Pts: Douglas Nunes 22; Rebs: Douglas Nunes 8 Asts: Larry Taylor 10	Pts: David Teague 29; Rebs: David Teague, Átila dos Santos 5 Asts: Fred Santos, Marcelinho Machado 4
Flamengo wins series, 3–1

Assoc. Luso Brasileira de Bauru, Bauru, São Paulo

== Semifinals ==
=== Franca (1) vs. (4) Flamengo ===
==== Game 1 ====
Sportv

May 6, 2011
21:00 UTC-03

Flamengo 69, Franca 73
Scoring by quarter: 23-26, 16-12, 14-21, 16-15
Pts: Marcelinho Machado 32; Rebs: Guilherme Teichmann 9 Asts: Marcelinho Machado 3	Pts: Hélio Rubens Filho 16; Rebs: Ricardo Probst 10; Asts: Hélio Rubens Filho 8
Franca led series, 1–0

HSBC Arena, Rio de Janeiro

==== Game 2 ====
Sportv

May 8, 2011
18:00 UTC-03

Franca 94, Flamengo 86
Scoring by quarter: 19-27, 19-16, 20-19, 36-24
Pts: Márcio Dornelles 18; Rebs: Fernando Penna 6 Asts: three players tied 4	Pts: Marcelinho Machado 40; Rebs: Guilherme Teichmann 9 Asts: Hélio Lima 5
Franca led series, 2-0

Ginásio Pedrocão, Franca, São Paulo

==== Game 3 ====
Sportv

May 10, 2011
21:00 UTC-03

Franca 91, Flamengo 78
Scoring by quarter: 25-12, 16-22, 29-22, 21-22
Pts: Vítor Benite 24; Rebs: William Drudi 7 Asts: Vítor Benite 5	Pts: Marcelinho Machado 27; Rebs: three players tied 5 Asts: Fred Santos 4
Franca wins series, 3-0

Ginásio Pedrocão, Franca, São Paulo

=== Pinheiros (2) vs. (3) Brasília ===
==== Game 1 ====
Sportv

May 6, 2011
19:00 UTC-03

Brasília 84, Pinheiros 80
Scoring by quarter: 23-18, 13-22, 21-18, 27-22
Pts: Guilherme Giovannoni 36; Rebs: Márcio Cipriano 13; Asts: Márcio Cipriano 5	Pts: Marquinhos 32; Rebs: Olivinha 7 Asts: Shamell Stallworth 3
Brasília led series, 1–0

Ginásio Nilson Nelson, Brasília, Ditrito Federal

==== Game 2 ====
Sportv

May 8, 2011
20:00 UTC-03

Pinheiros 89, Brasília 90
Scoring by quarter: 19-23, 20-19, 22-24, 28-24
Pts: Olivinha 19; Rebs: Olivinha 7 Asts: Marquinhos 4	Pts: Guilherme Giovannoni 23; Rebs: Lucas Tischer 8 Asts: Nezinho dos Santos 11
Brasília led series, 2-0

Ginásio Henrique Villaboim, São Paulo, São Paulo

==== Game 3 ====
Sportv

May 10, 2011
19:00 UTC-03

Pinheiros 99, Brasília 92
Scoring by quarter: 16-15, 28-17, 24-28, 16-24
Pts: Marquinhos 27; Rebs: Bruno Fiorotto 8 Asts: Shamell Stallworth 4	Pts: Guilherme Giovannoni 29; Rebs: Guilherme Giovannoni 10; Asts: Nezinho dos Santos 9
Brasília led series, 2–1

Ginásio Henrique Villaboim, São Paulo, São Paulo

==== Game 4 ====
Sportv

May 13, 2011
21:00 UTC-03

Brasília 99, Pinheiros 93 (OT)
Scoring by quarter: 14-28, 23-19, 25-20, 24-19, Overtime: 13-7
Pts: Alex Garcia 31; Rebs: Guilherme Giovannoni 12; Asts: Alex Garcia 5	Pts: Olivinha 26; Rebs: Morro 7 Asts: Juan Pablo Figueroa, Marquinhos 5
Brasília wins series, 3-1

Ginásio Nilson Nelson, Brasília, Ditrito Federal

== Finals ==
=== Franca (1) vs. (3) Brasília ===
==== Game 1 ====
Sportv

May 19, 2011
21:00 UTC-03

Brasília 92, Franca 72
Scoring by quarter: 22-17, 31-16, 19-17, 20-22
Pts: Guilherme Giovannoni, Nezinho 16; Rebs: three players tied 7 Asts: Nezinho dos Santos 7	Pts: Dedé Stefanelli 22; Rebs: William Drudi 9 Asts: Hélio Rubens Filho 6
Brasília led series, 1–0

Ginásio Nilson Nelson, Brasília, Ditrito Federal

==== Game 2 ====
Sportv

May 21, 2011
21:30 UTC-03

Franca 75, Brasília 80
Scoring by quarter: 14-18, 19-12, 20-22, 22-28
Pts: Márcio Dornelles 13; Rebs: William Drudi 9 Asts: Fernando Penna, Dedé Stefanelli 4	Pts: Guilherme Giovannoni 34; Rebs: Guilherme Giovannoni 10; Asts: Nezinho dos Santos, Alex Garcia 3
Brasília led series, 2-0

Ginásio Pedrocão, Franca, São Paulo

==== Game 3 ====
Sportv

May 22, 2011
21:30 UTC-03

Franca 93, Brasília 92 (OT)
Scoring by quarter: 26-23, 11-17, 24-18, 17-20, Overtime: 15-14
Pts: Hélio Rubens Filho 33; Rebs: Hélio Rubens Filho 12; Asts: Vítor Benite 3	Pts: Alex Garcia 24; Rebs: Guilherme Giovannoni 7 Asts: Nezinho dos Santos 7
Brasília led series, 2–1

Ginásio Pedrocão, Franca, São Paulo

==== Game 4 ====
Sportv

May 24, 2011
21:00 UTC-03

Brasília 77, Franca 68
Scoring by quarter: 19-12, 15-9, 17-17, 26-30
Pts: Guilherme Giovannoni 17; Rebs: Guilherme Giovannoni, Márcio Cipriano 9 Asts: Nezinho dos Santos 5	Pts: Vítor Benite 16; Rebs: Ricardo Probst 5 Asts: Hélio Rubens Filho, Ricardo Probst 3
Brasília wins NBB Finals, 3-1

Ginásio Nilson Nelson, Brasília, Ditrito Federal

== Awards ==
- MVP - Guilherme Giovannoni (Brasília)
- Finals MVP - Guilherme Giovannoni (Brasília)
- Sixth Player - Vítor Benite (Franca)
- Best Defender - Alex Garcia (Brasília)
- Revelation - Vítor Benite (Franca)
- Most Improved Player - Vítor Benite (Franca)
- Coach - Hélio Rubens (Franca)

== All-Team ==
Position	Player	Team
PG	Larry Taylor	Bauru
SG	Alex Garcia	Brasília
SF	Marquinhos	Pinheiros
PF	Guilherme Giovannoni	Brasília
C	Murilo Becker	São José
