= 2009 NBB season =

NBB 2009
- League: Novo Basquete Brasil
- Sport: Basketball
- Duration: January 28–June 28, 2009
- Teams: 15
- TV partner(s): SporTV; Rede Globo

NBB season
- Champions: Flamengo
- Season MVP: (Brazil) Marcelinho Machado (Flamengo)

NBB seasons
- ← 2008 2009–10 →

Novo Basquete Brasil (NBB) is the Brazilian basketball league, created in 2008 as the new format to the Campeonato Brasileiro de Basquete. NBB is fully organized by the participating clubs, as an attempt to reorganize and rebuild the Brazilian basketball. The form of dispute follows a similar model adopted by the NBA and European countries. The first edition was disputed by fifteen teams playing each other in the round and second round at the classification stage. At the end of two rounds, the top eight teams qualify for the playoffs in best of five matches, advances to the next phase who win three games.

== Participating teams ==
- Winner Limeira
- Franca
- Paulistano
- Araraquara
- Assis Basket
- Bauru
- São José
- Pinheiros
- Flamengo
- Saldanha da Gama
- CETAF Vila Velha
- Brasília
- Joinville
- Bira-Lajeado
- Minas

== Regular season ==
Classification
Team		Pts	G	W	D	PM	PA	PDif	AVE
1	Flamengo	54	28	26	2	2616	2224	392	1.17626
2	Brasília	50	28	22	6	2442	2208	234	1.10598
3	Minas	49	28	21	7	2428	2212	216	1.09765
4	Joinville	49	28	21	7	2320	2108	212	1.10057
5	Winner Limeira	46	28	18	10	2399	2307	92	1.03988
6	Bauru	44	28	16	12	2288	2195	93	1.04237
7	Franca	44	28	16	12	2271	2201	70	1.03180
8	Pinheiros	44	28	16	12	2438	2336	102	1.04366
9	Paulistano	39	28	11	17	2161	2308	-147	0.93631
10	CETAF Vila Velha	38	28	10	18	2100	2211	-111	0.94980
11	Assis Basket	38	28	10	18	2077	2239	-162	0.92765
12	Araraquara	36	28	8	20	2099	2261	-162	0.92835
13	São José	35	28	7	21	2164	2313	-149	0.93558
14	Saldanha da Gama	32	28	4	24	2037	2425	-388	0.84000
15	Bira-Lajeado	32	28	4	24	2047	2339	-292	0.87516
Pts – points; G – games played; W - wins; D - defeats; PM – points made; PA – points against; PDif - point difference; AVE – average

Classification

Ranked for the playoffs

== Playoffs ==
Quarterfinals
1	Flamengo	92	92	87	–	–	3
8	Pinheiros	87	85	84	–	–	0
4	Joinville	77	85	77	95	–	3
5	Limeira	87	75	63	89	–	1
3	Minas	83	74	75	–	–	3
6	Bauru	79	47	74	–	–	0
2	Brasília	78	96	76	73	64	3
7	Franca	76	105	66	74	59	2

Semifinals
1	Flamengo	88	92	109	–	–	3
4	Joinville	86	86	94	–	–	0
3	Minas	91	76	79	90	–	1
2	Brasília	78	103	89	101	–	3

Finals
1	Flamengo	81	71	99	78	76	3
2	Brasília	74	81	78	82	68	2

== Quarterfinals ==
=== Flamengo (1) vs. (8) Pinheiros ===
==== Game 1 ====
Sportv

May 16, 2009
18:00 UTC-03

Pinheiros 87, Flamengo 92
Scoring by quarter: 25-19, 16-23, 27-25, 19-25
Pts: Marquinhos 25; Rebs: Olivinha 13; Asts: Olivinha 6	Pts: Marcelinho Machado 40; Rebs: Marcelinho Machado 10; Asts: Marcelinho Machado 4
Flamengo led series, 1–0

Ginásio Henrique Villaboim, São Paulo, São Paulo
Referees:
- Carlos Renato Santos
- Sérgio Pacheco
- Sérgio Pranchevicius

==== Game 2 ====
Sportv

May 18, 2009
18:00 UTC-03

Flamengo 92, Pinheiros 85
Pts: Marcelinho Machado 27; Rebs: Baby; Asts: Hélio Lima 7	Pts: Marquinhos 37; Rebs: Marquinhos 11
Flamengo led series, 2–0

Ginásio Álvaro Vieira Lima, Rio de Janeiro, Rio de Janeiro

==== Game 3 ====
Sportv

May 20, 2009
18:00 UTC-03

Flamengo 87, Pinheiros 84
Rebs: Olivinha 11; Asts: Marquinhos 5	Pts: Marcelinho Machado 32
Flamengo wins series, 3–0

Ginásio Álvaro Vieira Lima, Rio de Janeiro, Rio de Janeiro

=== Brasília (2) vs. (7) Franca ===
==== Game 1 ====
Sportv

May 17, 2009
12:00 UTC-03

Franca 76, Brasília 78
Scoring by quarter: 21-29, 19-28, 18-12, 18-9
Pts: Felipe 19; Rebs: Rogério Klafke 8 Asts: Helio Rubens Filho 5	Pts: Alex Garcia 24; Rebs: Alex Garcia 8 Asts: Valter da Silva 4
Brasília led series, 1–0

Ginásio Pedrocão, Franca, São Paulo
Referees:
- José A. Piovesan
- Marco A. Ferreira
- Vander Lobosco Jr.

==== Game 2 ====
Sportv

May 19, 2009
18:00 UTC-03

Brasília 96, Franca 105
Pts: Alex Garcia 32; Rebs: Rafael Rodrigues 12; Asts: Valter da Silva 4
Series tied, 1–1

Ginásio Nilson Nelson, Brasília, Distrito Federal

==== Game 3 ====
Sportv

May 21, 2009
18:00 UTC-03

Brasília 76, Franca 66
Pts: Valter da Silva 18; Asts: Valter da Silva 6	Rebs: William Drudi 13
Brasília led series, 2–1

Ginásio Nilson Nelson, Brasília, Distrito Federal

==== Game 4 ====
Sportv

May 23, 2009
18:00 UTC-03

Franca 74, Brasília 73
Pts: William Drudi 20; Asts: Valter da Silva 8	Rebs: Alex Garcia 10
Series tied, 2–2

Ginásio Pedrocão, Franca, São Paulo

==== Game 5 ====
Sportv

May 25, 2009
18:00 UTC-03

Brasília 64, Franca 59
Pts: Alex Garcia 18; Rebs: Alex Garcia 10	Asts: Matheus 6
Brasília wins series, 3–2

Ginásio Nilson Nelson, Brasília, Distrito Federal

=== Minas (3) vs. (6) Bauru ===
==== Game 1 ====
Sportv

May 17, 2009
18:00 UTC-03

Bauru 79, Minas 83
Scoring by quarter: 8-24, 18-21, 26-14, 27-24
Pts: Fernando Fischer 24; Rebs: Mãozão 9 Asts: Larry Taylor 5	Pts: Joseph Shipp 24; Rebs: Murilo Becker 8 Asts: Facundo Sucatzky 7
Minas led series, 1-0

Ginásio Panela de Pressão, Bauru, São Paulo

==== Game 2 ====
Sportv

May 19, 2009
18:00 UTC-03

Minas 74, Bauru 47
Pts: Murilo Becker 21; Rebs: Ricardo Probst 11; Asts: Luiz Felipe Lemes 6
Minas led series, 2-0

Arena Vivo, Belo Horizonte, Minas Gerais

==== Game 3 ====
Sportv

May 21, 2009
18:00 UTC-03

Minas 75, Bauru 74
Rebs: Ricardo Probst, Murilo Becker 8 Asts: Facundo Sucatzky 5	Pts: Larry Taylor 30; Asts: Larry Taylor 5
Minas wins series, 3-0

Arena Vivo, Belo Horizonte, Minas Gerais

=== Joinville (4) vs. (5) Limeira ===
==== Game 1 ====
Sportv

May 16, 2009
18:00 UTC-03

Limeira 87, Joinville 77
Scoring by quarter: 24-15, 17-24, 25-17, 21-21
Pts: Bruno Fiorotto 17; Rebs: Bruno Fiorotto 14; Asts: Nezinho dos Santos 6	Pts: Jefferson Sobral 22; Rebs: Shilton dos Santos 12; Asts: Shilton dos Santos 6
Limeira led series, 1-0

Ginásio Vô Lucato, Limeira, São Paulo

==== Game 2 ====
Sportv

May 18, 2009
18:00 UTC-03

Joinville 85, Limeira 75
Rebs: Shilton dos Santos 17; Asts: Shilton dos Santos 5	Pts: Nezinho dos Santos 22; Asts: Shamell Stallworth 5
Series tied, 1-1

Centreventos Cau Hansen, Joinville, Santa Catarina

==== Game 3 ====
Sportv

May 20, 2009
18:00 UTC-03

Joinville 77, Limeira 63
Pts: Jefferson Sobral 20; Rebs: Shilton dos Santos 21; Asts: Manteiguinha 8
Joinville led series, 2-1

Centreventos Cau Hansen, Joinville, Santa Catarina

==== Game 4 ====
Sportv

May 22, 2009
18:00 UTC-03

Limeira 89, Joinville 95
Pts: Shamell Stallworth 22; Asts: Renato Lamas 7	Rebs: Tiagão 10
Joinville wins series, 3-1

Ginásio Vô Lucato, Limeira, São Paulo

== Semifinals ==
=== Flamengo (1) vs. (4) Joinville ===
==== Game 1 ====
Sportv

May 26, 2009
18:00 UTC-03

Joinville 86, Flamengo 88
Pts: Jefferson Sobral 20; Rebs: Shilton dos Santos 15; Asts: Manteiguinha, Jefferson Sobral 6	Pts: Marcelinho Machado 32; Asts: Duda Machado 6
Flamengo led series, 1-0

Centreventos Cau Hansen, Joinville, Santa Catarina

==== Game 2 ====
Sportv

May 29, 2009
18:00 UTC-03

Flamengo 92, Joinville 86
Pts: Marcelinho Machado 32; Asts: Fred Santos 5	Rebs: Shilton dos Santos 8 Asts: Shilton dos Santos 5
Flamengo led series, 2-0

Ginásio Álvaro Vieira Lima, Rio de Janeiro, Rio de Janeiro

==== Game 3 ====
Sportv

May 31, 2009
18:00 UTC-03

Flamengo 109, Joinville 94
Pts: Jefferson William 21; Rebs: Hélio Lima 8	Pts: Manteiguinha 27; Asts: Manteiguinha 7
Flamengo wins series, 3-0

Ginásio Álvaro Vieira Lima, Rio de Janeiro, Rio de Janeiro

=== Brasília (2) vs. Minas (3) ===
==== Game 1 ====
Sportv

May 27, 2009
18:00 UTC-03

Minas 91, Brasília 78
Rebs: Murilo Becker 7 Asts: Facundo Sucatzky 15	Pts: Alex Garcia 28
Minas led series, 1-0

Arena Vivo, Belo Horizonte, Minas Gerais

==== Game 2 ====
Sportv

May 30, 2009
18:00 UTC-03

Brasília 103, Minas 76
Pts: Alex Garcia, Valter da Silva 21; Rebs: Alex Garcia 8 Asts: Valter da Silva 8	Rebs: Murilo Becker 8
Series tied, 1-1

Ginásio Nilson Nelson, Brasília, Distrito Federal

==== Game 3 ====
Sportv

June 1st, 2009
18:00 UTC-03

Brasília 89, Minas 79
Pts: Alex Garcia 29; Asts: Valter da Silva 6	Rebs: Murilo Becker 13
Brasília led series, 2-1

Ginásio Nilson Nelson, Brasília, Distrito Federal

==== Game 4 ====
Sportv

June 3, 2009
18:00 UTC-03

Minas 90, Brasília 101
Pts: Murilo Becker 24; Rebs: Murilo Becker 10; Asts: Facundo Sucatzky 6
Brasília wins series, 3-1

Arena Vivo, Belo Horizonte, Minas Gerais

== Finals ==
=== Game 1 ===
Sportv

June 11, 2009
12:00 UTC-03

Brasília 74, Flamengo 81
Scoring by quarter: 18-21, 22-12, 16-23, 18-25
Pts: Alex Garcia 23; Rebs: Diego Pinheiro 11; Asts: Alex Garcia 3	Pts: Marcelinho Machado 32; Rebs: Jefferson William 7 Asts: Marcelinho Machado, Fred Santos 4
Flamengo led series, 1-0

Ginásio Nilson Nelson, Brasília, Distrito Federal
Referees:
- Carlos Renato dos Santos
- Sérgio Pacheco
- Francisco Lima Filho

=== Game 2 ===
Sportv

June 13, 2009
12:00 UTC-03

Flamengo 71, Brasília 81
Scoring by quarter: 19-28, 16-16, 12-15, 24-22
Pts: Marcelinho Machado 16; Rebs: Baby 10; Asts: Duda Machado 5	Pts: Alex Garcia 17; Rebs: Estevam Ferreira 11; Asts: Valter da Silva 8
Series tied, 1-1

HSBC Arena, Rio de Janeiro, Rio de Janeiro
Referees:
- José A. Piovesan
- Marco A. Ferreira
- Cristiano Maranho

=== Game 3 ===
Sportv

June 14, 2009
13:00 p.m. UTC-03

Flamengo 99, Brasília 78
Scoring by quarter: 27-16, 17-27, 32-7, 23-18
Pts: Marcelinho Machado 35; Rebs: Marcelinho Machado 12; Asts: Duda Machado 6	Pts: Alex Garcia 20; Rebs: David 8 Asts: Valter da Silva 7
Flamengo led series, 2-1

HSBC Arena, Rio de Janeiro, Rio de Janeiro
Referees:
- Jose A. Piovesan
- Sergio Pacheco
- Cristiano Maranho

=== Game 4 ===
Sportv

June 21, 2009
12:00 UTC-03

Brasília 82, Flamengo 78 (OT)
Scoring by quarter: 22-22, 11-12, 21-22, 16-14, Overtime: 12-8
Pts: Alex Garcia 16; Rebs: Márcio Cipriano 14; Asts: Valter da Silva 5	Pts: Marcelinho Machado 24; Rebs: Baby 10; Asts: Duda Machado 3
Series tied, 2-2

Ginásio Nilson Nelson, Brasília, Distrito Federal
Referees:
- José A. Piovesan
- José C. Pelissari
- Carlos Renato dos Santos

=== Game 5 ===
Sportv

June 14, 2009
10:00 a.m. UTC-03

Flamengo 76, Brasília 68
Scoring by quarter: 19-17, 23-19, 15-15, 19-17
Pts: Marcelinho Machado 27; Rebs: Wagner Mattos 8 Asts: Duda Machado, Hélio Lima 4	Pts: Alex Garcia 35; Rebs: Estevam Ferreira 9 Asts: Valter da Silva 5
Flamengo wins NBB Finals, 3-2

HSBC Arena, Rio de Janeiro, Rio de Janeiro
Attendance: 15.430 (maximum capacity)
Referees:
- Jose A. Piovesan
- Sergio Pacheco
- Cristiano Maranho

== Awards ==
- MVP - Marcelinho Machado (Flamengo)
- Sixth Player - Fred Santos (Flamengo)
- Best Defender - Alex Garcia (Brasília)
- Coach - Paulo Sampaio (Flamengo)

== All-Team ==
Position	Player	Team
PG	Larry Taylor	Bauru
SG	Alex Garcia	Brasília
SF	Marcelinho Machado	Flamengo
PF	Murilo Becker	Minas
C	Rafael Araújo	Flamengo
