= Robert Day (basketball) =

American basketball player (born 1982)

Personal information
- Born: January 13, 1982 (age 44) Portland, Oregon
- Listed height: 6 ft 6 in (1.98 m)
- Listed weight: 220 lb (100 kg)

Career information
- High school: Benson Polytechnic (Portland, Oregon)
- College: Western Oregon (2000–2004)
- NBA draft: 2004: undrafted
- Playing career: 2004–2016
- Position: Shooting guard / small forward
- Number: 31

Career history
- 2004–2006: Algodoneros de la Comarca
- 2007–2008: Caballeros de Culiacan
- 2008–2009: Algodoneros de la Comarca
- 2009–2010: Lobos Grises de la UAD Durango
- 2010–2014: Uberlândia
- 2014–2016: Bauru

Career highlights
- 3× NBB All-Star (2011–2013); NBB All-Star Game MVP (2011); NBB All Team (2013); ABA All Star-Game (2005)

Robert Andrew Day (born January 31, 1982), is an American former professional basketball player, who last played with the Brazilian team Bauru, of the Novo Basquete Brasil, the major Brazilian basketball league.

== Early life and career ==
Born in Portland, Oregon, Day started to practice basketball at 10 years old. He went on to play high school basketball at Benson Polytechnic High School where he averaged over 20 points per game as a senior.

== College career ==
After high school, Day played college basketball at Western Oregon University, with the Western Oregon Wolves.

== Professional career ==
Day's first professional team was with the Algodoneros de la Comarca in Mexico where he stayed for two years. He stopped playing for a season and a half due to a lack of playing time and a lack of opportunities elsewhere. He returned to professional basketball again in Mexico in the second half of the 2007–08 season with Caballeros de Culiacan. The following season, he returned to Algodoneros de la Comarca.

In the 2009–10 season he signed with Lobos Grises de la UAD Durango in the hopes of gaining visibility outside of Mexico. After the season, his agent initially arranged for him to participate in a tournament in China with an Argentine team, but after further negotiations he signed with Brazilian team Unitri/Uberlândia for 2010–11 NBB season.

In his first season in Brazil, Day gained visibility and became known for being extremely dangerous from the three-point line. His great performances earned him a spot in the NBB All-Star Game, held in Franca, where he played for a team composed of foreign players, called NBB Mundo (NBB World), against a team composed entirely of Brazilian players. Day started the game on the bench, but when he entered the court, his story began to be written. With a rare performance from the three-point line, Day hit an unbelievable 12 three-pointers and scored an incredible 50 points. NBB World won the match 115–99 and Day was named the MVP of the game. During the season, Robert Day, assisted by Robby Collum and Valtinho, led the team to the quarterfinals of the championship, being eliminated by Brasília of Alex Garcia, Guilherme Giovannoni and Nezinho dos Santos.

The following season, Uberlândia emerged as one of the favorites of the NBB. The team had been having a great season, having led a good portion of the regular season, but the departure of Uruguayan coach Miguel Volcan in the middle of the season was detrimental to the team, which finished fifth in the first phase. In the playoffs, the team of Minas Gerais was eliminated by Flamengo in the quarterfinals.

But in the 2012–13 NBB season, with the return of Helio Rubens Garcia and Helio Rubens Filho, Robert Day had his best season in Brazil, led the team to the championship final, again facing Flamengo. But this match, played at the Rio de Janeiro, was canceled. The Paraguayan Bruno Zanotti took charge to mark the American, which was fundamental for the title of the team from Rio de Janeiro.

After the match, Robert Day was chosen to the NBB First Team, beside Fúlvio de Assis, Marquinhos, Rafael Mineiro and Caio Torres.

Robert Andrew Day now has 3 kids Lainey (the oldest), Cooper (the middle), and Beckett (the youngest).

== Brazilian League statistics ==
=== NBB regular season ===
Season	Team	GP	MPG	FG%	3PT%	FT%	RPG	APG	SPG	BPG	PPG
2010–11	Uberlândia	28	30.5	.486	.395	.833	4.4	1.6	1.3	.2	17.1
2011–12	Uberlândia	26	33.7	.509	.413	.853	5.1	2.6	1.3	.1	16.5
2012–13	Uberlândia	34	34.7	.555	.478	.871	4.6	3.6	1.7	.1	18.8
2013–14	Uberlândia	27	32.2	.517	.443	.840	5.0	2.8	1.3	.1	17.5
Career		115	32.5	.519	.435	.852	4.8	2.7	1.4	.1	17.5
All-Star		3	–	–	–	–	–	–	–	–	26.3

=== NBB playoffs ===
Season	Team	GP	MPG	FG%	3PT%	FT%	RPG	APG	SPG	BPG	PPG
2011	Uberlândia	8	32.9	.609	.529	.771	6.4	2.4	1.5	.4	22.8
2012	Uberlândia	9	32.8	.520	.444	.769	4.3	2.7	0.8	.1	19.1
2013	Uberlândia	9	32.9	.500	.515	.879	4.2	2.3	0.4	.0	14.6
2014	Uberlândia	5	33.7	.497	.412	.852	6.2	2.8	1.8	.2	18.0
Career		31	33.1	.536	.459	.806	5.3	2.5	1.1	.2	18.5
