= Carlos Olivinha =

Brazilian basketball player (born 1983)

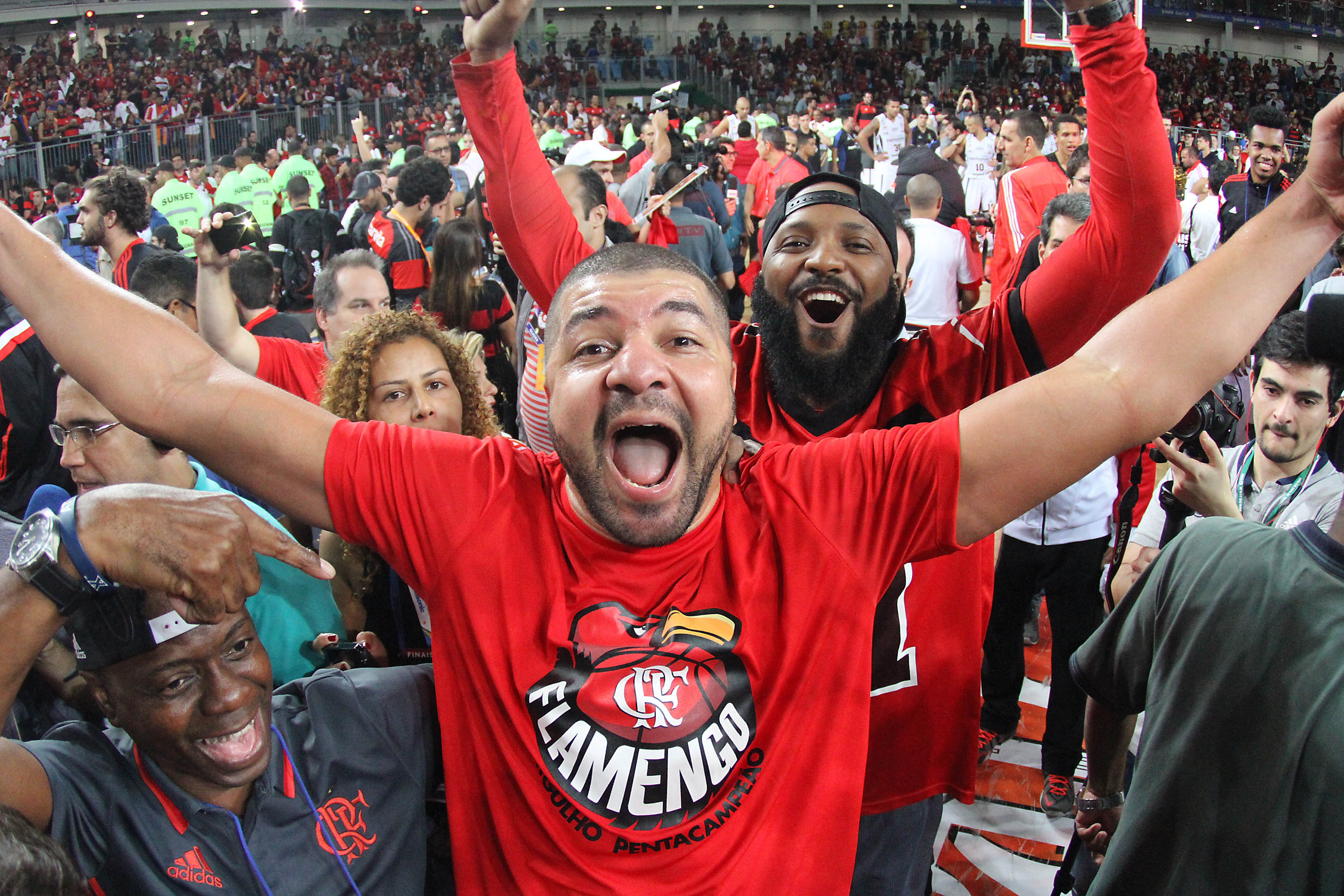
- Olivinha with Flamengo, in 2015.

Personal information
- Born: April 18, 1983 (age 43) Rio de Janeiro, Brazil
- Listed height: 6 ft 8 in (2.03 m)
- Listed weight: 260 lb (118 kg)

Career information
- Playing career: 2003–2024
- Position: Small forward / power forward

Career history
- 2003–2009: Flamengo
- 2008–2009: Uberlândia
- 2009–2012: Pinheiros
- 2012–2024: Flamengo

Career highlights
- 2× FIBA Intercontinental Cup champion (2014, 2022); 2× BCLA/FIBA Americas League champion (2014, 2021); 6× NBB champion (2013–2016, 2019, 2021); 2× Super 8 Cup champion (2018, 2021); NBB Finals MVP (2016, 2019); NBB All-Star Game (2013)
Medals
Men's basketball
Representing Brazil
FIBA AmeriCup
Gold medal – first place	2009 San Juan
Pan American Games
Gold medal – first place	2015 Toronto
FIBA South American Championship
Silver medal – second place	2016 Caracas
Bronze medal – third place	2014 Isla Margarita

Carlos Alexandre Rodrigues do Nascimento (born April 18, 1983), commonly known as Carlos Olivinha, or simply Olivinha, is a Brazilian former professional basketball player. At 6 ft 8 in (2.03 m), he played at either the small forward or power forward positions, with power forward being his main position. He was born in Rio de Janeiro.

== Professional career ==
In the Brazilian League's 2009–10 regular season, Olivinha averaged 20.8 points and 10.4 rebounds per game.

== National team career ==
Olivinha has also been a member of the senior men's Brazilian national basketball team. He made his debut with the senior team at the 2009 Marchand Continental Championship Cup, averaging 3.3 points and 1.3 rebounds per game for the team. He also competed for the gold medal-winning Brazilian team at the 2009 FIBA AmeriCup, seeing action in four games off the bench for the Brazilians. He also played at the 2015 FIBA AmeriCup.

== NBB career statistics ==
†	Denotes seasons in which Olivinha won NBB championship
*	Led the league

=== NBB regular season ===
Season	Team	GP	MPG	2PT FG%	3PT FG%	FT%	RPG	APG	SPG	BPG	PPG
2009	Pinheiros	28	36.0	.599	.422	.748	10.2	1.5	1.4	.2	20.4
2009–10	Pinheiros	26	34.6	.587	.347	.812	10.4	1.9	1.2	.8	20.8
2010–11	Pinheiros	26	32.2	.641	.365	.773	8.9	1.7	1.0	.3	17.9
2011–12	Pinheiros	28	29.1	.630	.307	.793	6.7	1.9	1.1	.5	15.0
2012–13†	Flamengo	34	29.8	.639	.325	.722	8.7	1.3	.5	.2	14.4
2013–14†	Flamengo	32	28.1	.551	.340	.783	8.4	1.2	.8	.2	12.9
2014–15†	Flamengo	29	22.6	.622	.349	.703	6.1	1.1	.9	.2	10.2
2015–16†	Flamengo	23	18.1	.621	.286	.680	4.4	.9	.5	.1	9.3
2016–17	Flamengo	28	26.5	.667	.340	.721	10.1	1.7	.8	.3	13.9
2017–18	Flamengo	28	19.3	.589	.246	.800	6.4	.9	.6	.1	8.8
2018–19†	Flamengo	26	19.5	.617	.355	.800	5.6	.7	.9	.1	12.4
2019–20	Flamengo	22	22.5	.492	.403	.768	6.3	1.0	1.0	.2	11.3
2020–21†	Flamengo	24	21.9	.550	.463	.743	7.4	1.8	.8	.3	12.8
Career		354	26.4	.605	.356	.760	7.7	1.4	.9	.2	13.9
All-Star		-	-	-	-	-	-	-	-	-	-

=== NBB playoffs ===
Season	Team	GP	MPG	2PT FG%	3PT FG%	FT%	RPG	APG	SPG	BPG	PPG
2009	Pinheiros	3	39.2	.565	.304	1.000	11.0	2.7	1.0	.0	18.7
2010	Pinheiros	6	38.3	.600	.345	.848	12.0	1.5	1.2	.5	17.7
2011	Pinheiros	8	32.3	.604	.333	.800	7.1	0.9	1.0	.3	12.8
2012	Pinheiros	10	31.1	.582	.175	.763	8.3	1.1	1.3	.1	12.8
2013†	Flamengo	9	26.9	.605	.323	.667	6.2	1.4	1.4	.2	9.6
2014†	Flamengo	9	24.8	.628	.333	.769	6.9	0.8	1.0	.3	11.1
2015†	Flamengo	10	26.3	.636	.353	.769	6.0	1.5	1.2	.1	12.6
2016†	Flamengo	12	25.9	.622	.467	.781	6.8	1.1	1.0	.2	14.1
2017	Flamengo	5	22.3	.586	.455	.889	6.0	1.2	1.0	.0	14.4
2018	Flamengo	7	19.0	.513	.250	.769	5.6	.9	.7	.0	8.4
2019†	Flamengo	12	21.2	.609	.419	.800	6.6	1.2	1.1	.2	11.8
2021†	Flamengo	8	22.5	.543	.250	.643	7.5	.5	.3	.1	9.6
Career		99	26.6	.596	.333	.786	7.2	1.1	1.0	.2	12.6
