= Rafael Araújo (basketball) =

Brazilian basketball player (born 1980)

Rafael Araujo
Personal information
- Born: August 12, 1980 (age 46) Curitiba, Paraná, Brazil
- Listed height: 6 ft 11 in (2.11 m)
- Listed weight: 275 lb (125 kg)

Career information
- High school: Padre Anacleto (São Paulo, Brazil)
- College: Arizona Western (2000–2002); BYU (2002–2004)
- NBA draft: 2004: 1st round, 8th overall pick
- Drafted by: Toronto Raptors
- Playing career: 2004–2014
- Position: Center
- Number: 55

Career history
- 2004–2006: Toronto Raptors
- 2006–2007: Utah Jazz
- 2007–2008: Spartak Saint Petersburg
- 2009: Flamengo
- 2009–2010: Paulistano
- 2010–2011: Flamengo
- 2011–2012: Franca
- 2012–2014: Mogi das Cruzes
- 2014: Pinheiros

Career highlights
- Brazilian League champion (2009); All-Brazilian League Team (2009); MWC co-Player of the Year (2004); First-team All-MWC (2094)

Career NBA statistics
- Points: 389 (2.8 ppg)
- Rebounds: 395 (2.8 rpg)
- Assists: 41 (0.3 apg)
- Stats at NBA.com
- Stats at Basketball Reference

Rafael Paulo de Lara Araújo (Brazilian Portuguese: [ʁafaˈɛw aɾaˈuʒu]; born August 12, 1980) is a Brazilian former professional basketball player. He played for three years in the National Basketball Association (NBA).

== College career ==
After attending Padre Anacleto High School in São Paulo, Araújo went to the United States to play college basketball, attending Arizona Western College in Yuma, Arizona. In his freshman season (2000–01), he averaged 12.1 points and 8.4 rebounds per game. Araújo later explained that AWC coach Kelly Green gave him $400 to get his visa and establish himself in Yuma, despite coaches being forbidden to do so. As a sophomore, he tallied 17.9 points and 10.7 rebounds per game, leading the Matadors to a 28–3 record and a top ten national ranking among junior colleges. He was named Region Most Valuable Player and 2nd Team NJCAA All-American. At the same time Araújo was drafted for the Brazil national basketball team at the 2002 World Championships, as NBA player Nenê could not attend the tournament.

After finishing his junior college career, Araújo moved to Brigham Young University in Provo, Utah where as a junior (2002–03), he averaged 12.0 points and 8.9 rebounds per game (second in the Mountain West Conference). In his senior season, Araújo led BYU in scoring (18.4 points per game), rebounding (10.1 rebounds per game), steals (43 total), and blocked shots (25). He was named Co-Player of the Year in the Mountain West Conference, sharing the honor with Air Force's Nick Welch. He was named 2nd Team NCAA All-American by Basketball Times and Honorable Mention All-American by the Associated Press.

With his size and strength, the 6-foot-11, 295-pound Araújo impressed many pro scouts during his senior season. On December 6, 2003, he dominated a tough Oklahoma State team, totaling 32 points and 17 rebounds in BYU's 76–71 upset victory. He concluded his collegiate career with a 24-point, 12-rebound performance in the Cougars' 80–75 loss to Syracuse in the NCAA Tournament.

== Controversy ==
During the 2002 World Championships in Indianapolis, Araújo tested positive for the steroid nandrolone. He was given a 24-month suspension from international play. He was subsequently found clean during tests while a player at BYU, and the NBA did not test players for steroid use. Araújo explained that the tests went positive because at the time he consumed a dietary supplement containing androstenedione, but he could still play because he was only suspended by FIBA, who does not sanction college basketball.

Araújo was involved in multiple on-court incidents during his senior season at BYU. On March 6, 2004, Araújo was reprimanded by the Mountain West Conference (MWC) for hitting UNLV guard Jerel Blassingame during an 89–88 win. Six days later on March 12, in a 54–51 loss to Utah, Araujo was charged with a technical foul for elbowing the Utes' Andrew Bogut in the head in the MWC Tournament.

== Professional career ==
The Toronto Raptors selected Araújo with the eighth pick in the 2004 NBA draft, making him the first college senior drafted that year, one pick ahead of future NBA finals MVP Andre Iguodala. His NBA career was mostly disappointing with him seeing limited action as a rookie, averaging 3.3 points and 3.1 rebounds in 12.5 minutes per game. He set a career-high with 14 rebounds against the Sacramento Kings on January 5, 2005. Days later, on January 9, he scored a career-high 14 points against the Golden State Warriors. He later matched that total against the Kings on November 25, 2005.

In the 2005-06 season, he again struggled through a disappointing year and had trouble getting playing time, averaging 11.6 minutes a game, 2.3 points, and 2.8 rebounds while shooting a dismal 36.6% from the field. Shortly after that season, Toronto GM Rob Babcock was fired, and it was rumored that the firing, in part, had to do with the drafting of Araújo. The player claimed he did not play much with the Raptors because then-coach Sam Mitchell held a grudge against Babcock, and thus he did not want to put Babcock's draft pick on the court.

On June 8, 2006, Araújo was traded to the Utah Jazz with an undisclosed amount of money for Kris Humphries and Robert Whaley. Many viewed this as a new beginning for Araújo, a chance for him to change the direction of his career. He worked hard in Utah, dropping his weight from 295 pounds to 275 in an effort to improve his athleticism. He also expressed much interest as he already played in Utah during college. However, he did not fit in well in Utah's offense, which was already set with Carlos Boozer, Andrei Kirilenko and Mehmet Okur in the frontcourt, and Araújo played sparingly during the 2006-07 season. He averaged 2.6 points and 2.4 rebounds per game in 28 games, averaging only 8.9 minutes per appearance.

Araújo's rookie contract expired after the 2006–07 season, and Jazz owner Larry H. Miller said publicly that he liked Araújo and hoped he could return to the team the following season. Araújo's final NBA game was played in Game 5 of the 2007 Western Conference Finals against the San Antonio Spurs on May 30, 2007. Utah will lose the game 84 - 109, with Araújo recording 7 points, 4 rebounds and 1 steal. San Antonio thus won the entire series 4 - 1.

Araújo played for Utah in the 2007 Rocky Mountain Revue, but the Jazz signed 7-foot-1 Kyrylo Fesenko during the offseason, filling the roster spot that Araújo held previously. With that opportunity gone, and his NBA career likely over, Araújo signed a 1-year, $500,000 contract to play for Spartak St. Petersburg in Russia. Araújo claimed that despite the easy adaptation, his lack of European passport and Spartak's underperformances led him to leave.

Araújo was in training camp with the NBA's Minnesota Timberwolves for 2008 but was waived before the 2008-09 season. He claimed that this happened because of the arrival of Kevin Love, and because Araújo was not in top shape due to an injured knee.

After a brief and failed stint at the Shanghai Sharks, in January 2009, Araújo signed with Brazilian club Flamengo for the 2009 season. The details of his contract were not revealed. He became the star of the club's team alongside Marcelinho Machado. Six months later, at the end of the 2009 season, he signed a deal with Paulistano for the 2009–10 season, and in June 2010 he transferred back to Flamengo signing a two-year contract. For his second stint at Flamengo, Araújo, for numerology reasons, changed the spelling of his nickname to "Bàbby" and his jersey number from 55 to 66.

Araújo made headlines in January 2011 by shattering a glass backboard with a powerful dunk during a game in the FIBA Americas League. Video of the play was widely circulated across the Internet.

In June 2011, he signed a deal with Franca Basquetebol Clube. In 2012, Araújo decided to retire, though he was open to return to basketball if he had a good proposal.

In October 2012, Araujo returned to basketball, signing with Mogi das Cruzes. He moved to Pinheiros in 2014.

== Career statistics ==
Legend
GP	Games played	GS	Games started	MPG	Minutes per game
FG%	Field goal percentage	3P%	3-point field goal percentage	FT%	Free throw percentage
RPG	Rebounds per game	APG	Assists per game	SPG	Steals per game
BPG	Blocks per game	PPG	Points per game	**Bold**	Career high

=== NBA ===
==== Regular season ====
Year	Team	GP	GS	MPG	FG%	3P%	FT%	RPG	APG	SPG	BPG	PPG
2004–05	Toronto	**59**	**41**	**12.5**	**.434**	**.333**	**.782**	**3.1**	.3	.4	**.1**	**3.3**
2005–06	Toronto	52	34	11.6	.366	.000	.536	2.8	.3	**.5**	**.1**	2.3
2006–07	Utah	28	0	8.9	.415	.000	.621	2.4	**.4**	.2	**.1**	2.6
Career		139	75	11.4	.405	.250	.679	2.8	.3	.4	.1	2.8

==== Playoffs ====
Year	Team	GP	GS	MPG	FG%	3P%	FT%	RPG	APG	SPG	BPG	PPG
2007	Utah	5	0	5.6	.375	.000	.417	2.2	.2	.2	.0	2.2
