= Valtinho da Silva =

Brazilian basketball player

Personal information
- Born: 31 January 1977 (age 49) Rio Claro, Brazil
- Listed height: 6 ft 1.25 in (1.86 m)
- Listed weight: 198 lb (90 kg)

Career information
- Playing career: 1995–2017
- Position: Point guard

Career history
- ?–?: Continental-SP
- 1995–1996: Rio Claro
- 1997–1998: COC/Ribeirão Preto
- 1999–2001: Franca
- 2001–2007: Uberlândia
- 2008: Vasco da Gama
- 2008–2010: Brasília
- 2010–2014: Uberlândia
- 2014–2015: São José
- 2015–2016: Paulistano
- 2016–2017: Bauru

Career highlights
- FIBA Americas League champion (2009); FIBA South American League champion (2005); FIBA South American League MVP (2005); South American Club champion (1995); 5× Brazilian champion (1995, 1999, 2004, 2010, 2017); 3× Brazilian League All-Star (2009–2011)
Medals
Men's basketball
Representing Brazil
Pan American Games
Gold medal – first place	2003 Santo Domingo
Gold medal – first place	2007 Rio de Janeiro
FIBA South American Championship
Gold medal – first place	2003 Montevideo

Válter Apolinário da Silva (31 January 1977), commonly known as Valtinho da Silva, or simply Valtinho, is a Brazilian former professional basketball player. Born in Rio Claro, he played at the point guard position, and he is considered one of the last classical point guards of Brazilian basketball. Recognized for being a player who had responsibility in defining moments, he knew how to control the dynamics of the game, always controlling the pace of his team on the court.

== Professional career ==
Valtinho was the conductor of Uberlândia, and beside the head coach Helio Rubens Garcia, and his son, Helio Rubens Filho, won the 2004 Brazilian national league title, beating Flamengo in the finals series 3–0.

After the 2007 Pan American Games, Valtinho moved to Vasco da Gama, to compete for the state championship in Rio de Janeiro, where he was defeated by his greatest team rival, Flamengo. His short spell at Gigante da Colina ended, when the point guard signed with the then Brazilian League champions, Brasilia.

In three seasons with Brasilia, Valtinho became one of the greatest club idols of the fans of Brasilia. Along with Alex Garcia and Arthur Belchior, da Silva was defeated in two consecutive finals of the Brazilian national league championship by Flamengo, which initiated the largest Brazilian basketball rivalry of recent times. But the following season, Brasilia hit back at the team led by Marcelinho Machado winning the FIBA South American League and the Brazilian national championship, in 2010.

After the 2010 FIBA World Championship, Valtinho returned to the city where he was an idol, Uberlândia. In his first two seasons with Uberlândia in the NBB, the team was eliminated in the quarterfinals – by Brasília in 2011, and by Flamengo in 2012. But the team's third appearance in the NBB in 2013, included the return of two of the club's idols, Helio Rubens Garcia and his son. The return of the two, added to Valtinho and Americans Robert Day and Robby Collum, led to an Uberlândia final against Flamengo, repeating the Brazilian League final from nine years earlier. But the ending was different. With the help of their fanatical fans, Flamengo annulled Robert Day, and led by the center Caio Torres, won their third Brazilian national league title.

== National team career ==
A great season with Uberlândia, led to Valtinho being selected by head coach Lula Ferreira, to compete at the 2007 Pan American Games, in Rio de Janeiro. It was Valtinho's return to the Brazilian national team, after four years. The team, which had players like Leandro Barbosa, Marcelinho Machado, Marquinhos, and Marcelinho Huertas, received unconditional support of Brazilian fans, and won the title, after winning the final against Puerto Rico.

Valtinho was called by head coach Rubén Magnano to play with Brazil at the 2010 FIBA World Championship, but he was eventually cut from the team, before the tournament began.
