= Manteguinha =

Brazilian basketball player

No. 5 – Araldite/Univille
- Position: Point guard
- League: Novo Basquete Brasil

Personal information
- Born: April 2, 1981 (age 45) Rio de Janeiro, Rio de Janeiro, Brazil
- Listed height: 6 ft 4 in (1.93 m)
- Listed weight: 207 lb (94 kg)

André Luiz Brügger de Mello Rodrigues, or Manteguinha (born 2 April 1981) is a Brazilian retired professional basketball player, who plays in the Novo Basquete Brasil league in Brazil. Manteguinha was born in Rio de Janeiro, and has played for many teams in Rio and around Brazil.

== Previous Teams ==
- Flamengo (RJ)
- Tijuca Tênis Clube (RJ)
- Clube Municipal (RJ)
- Vasco da Gama (RJ)
- Ajax (GO)
- Uberlândia (MG)

== Araldite/Univille ==
Manteguinha is the starting shooting guard for Joinville's NBB team, and is usually the top scorer on the team. In the edition of the Novo Basquete Brasil league (2008–2009), Manteguinha led Joinville to a 4th place overall finish, losing on the semifinals to the future champion Flamengo Basketball.

== NBB Stats ==
=== Regular season ===
Legend
League leader

Year	Team	GP	GS	MPG	FG%	3P%	FT%	RPG	APG	SPG	BPG	PPG
2008–09	Joinville	29	29	34.1	.543	.485	.794	2.7	4.2	N/A	0.1	17.8
2009–10	Joinville	24	24	32.0	.500	.407	.868	2.42	2.75	1.25	0.3	15.2

=== Playoffs ===
Year	Team	GP	GS	MPG	FG%	3P%	FT%	RPG	APG	SPG	BPG	PPG
2008–09	Joinville	7	7	38.1	.571	.554	—N/a	—N/a	5.6	—N/a	—N/a	20.7
