= Clube Atlético Ubirajá =

Bira
- Leagues: NBB
- Founded: 1955
- Arena: Complexo Esportivo da Univates (capacity: 4.000)
- Location: Lajeado, Brazil
- Team colors: red and green
- President: Walmor Spellmeier
- Head coach: (Brazil) Antônio Fernando Krebs Jr
- Website: univates.br/bira
Home	Away

Clube Atlético Ubirajá, commonly known as Bira, is a Brazilian basketball club located in Lajeado, in the Rio Grande do Sul State that competes in NBB, the country's premier professional men's basketball league.

== Titles ==
Rio Grande do Sul State Basketball Championship

- Winners (5): 2006, 2007, 2008, 2011, 2012

Brazilian Cup - South

- Winners (1): 2012
