= Kojo Mensah =

Ghanaian basketball player

Free agent
- Position: Guard

Personal information
- Born: April 1, 1986 (age 40) Ghana
- Listed height: 6 ft 1 in (1.85 m)

Career information
- College: Duquesne (2006-2008)
- Playing career: 2008–2019

Career history
- 2015/16: Esporte Clube Vitória
- 2017: Nauticos of Mazatlan

Thad Kojo Mensah (born April 1, 1986) is a Ghanaian former professional basketball player.

Mensah attended Bishop Loughlin High School, where he received all-city recognition and participated in the ABCD Camp, which included Top 100 high school players in the country.

Siena college where he was third team as a freshman and lead his team in scoring and assists, along with second in rebounds as a guard.

Attended Duquesne where he led in triple doubles and second in scoring behind Shawn James.

2012-2013 Played for the prestigious Clube do Flamengo basketball team in Brazil where he was a 2x champion.

In 2015–16, he played for Esporte Clube Vitória of the Novo Basquete Brasil.

His last team as an active player was Nauticos of Mazatlan of the Circuito de Baloncesto de la Costa del Pacífico.

== Accomplishments ==
- 1999 Eastern Invitational MVP
- 2000 Five-star basketball camp MVP
- 2000 ABCD all American Camp
- 2002 MAAC third Team Siena
- 2006 Duquesne leader in triple doubles in a single season
- 2009 Uruguayan League First Team
- 2010 Venezuelan LPB All-Star Game
- 2012 Novo Basquete Brazil all-league
- 2013 Novo Basquete Brasil Champion
- 2015 Venezuelan LPB all-league
- 2016 Venezuelan LPB all star
- 2017 Novo Basquete Brasil all-star
