= Marquinhos Vieira =

Brazilian basketball player (born 1984)

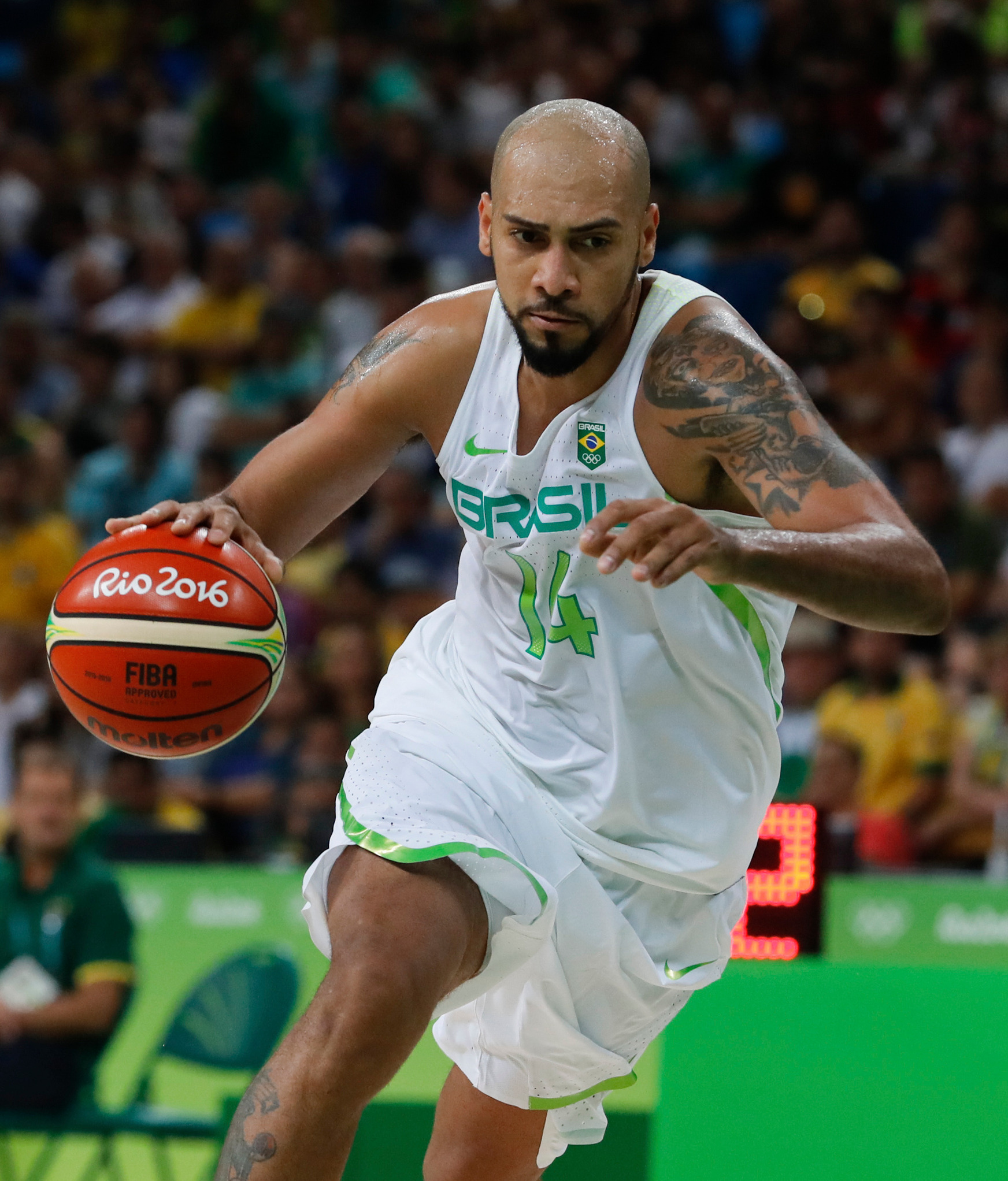
- Marquinhos Vieira at the 2016 Summer Olympics.

Personal information
- Born: May 31, 1984 (age 42) Rio de Janeiro, Brazil
- Listed height: 6 ft 9 in (2.06 m)
- Listed weight: 225 lb (102 kg)

Career information
- NBA draft: 2006: 2nd round, 43rd overall pick
- Drafted by: New Orleans/Oklahoma City Hornets
- Playing career: 2000–2025
- Position: Forward / shooting guard

Career history
- 2000–2001: Corinthians
- 2002: Bauru
- 2002–2003: Vasco da Gama
- 2003–2004: Corinthians / Mogi das Cruzes
- 2004–2005: Sutor Montegranaro
- 2005–2006: São Carlos
- 2006–2008: New Orleans Hornets (Note: During the 2005–06 and 2006–07 seasons, the team was known as the New Orleans/Oklahoma City Hornets during their temporary relocation to Oklahoma City due to Hurricane Katrina.)
- 2006–2007: →Tulsa 66ers
- 2008–2009: Pinheiros
- 2009–2010: Sutor Montegranaro
- 2010–2012: Pinheiros
- 2012–2021: Flamengo
- 2021–2022: São Paulo FC
- 2023-2025: Vasco da gama

Career highlights
- FIBA Intercontinental Cup champion (2014); 5× NBB champion (2013–2016, 2019); CBB champion (2002); 3× NBB MVP (2013, 2016, 2018); 10× All-NBB Team (2011–2016, 2018–2021); 7× NBB All-Star Game (2009, 2011–2013, 2015, 2016, 2018); 2× Copa Super 8 winner (2018, 2021); Copa Super 8 MVP (2018); 2× BCL Americas champion (2021, 2022)
- Stats at NBA.com
- Stats at Basketball Reference
Medals
Men's basketball
Representing Brazil
FIBA AmeriCup
Silver medal – second place	2011 Mar del Plata
Pan American Games
Gold medal – first place	2007 Rio de Janeiro

Marcus Vinicius Vieira de Souza (born May 31, 1984), commonly known as Marquinhos Vieira, or simply Marquinhos, is a Brazilian former professional basketball player for CR Vasco da Gama (basketball) in the Novo Basquete Brasil (NBB). He also represents the senior Brazilian national team.

At a height of 2.07 m (6 ft 9 in) tall, and a weight of 102 kg (225 lb), he can play shooting guard, small forward, and power forward.

== Professional career ==
=== Early career ===
In the 2004–05 season, Vieira played professionally in the Italian 2nd Division, with Premiata Montegranaro. He played professionally with São Carlos Clube Basquete in Brazil, in the 2005–06 season. Vieira was a second round NBA draft choice of the New Orleans/Oklahoma City Hornets, in the 2006 NBA draft, chosen 43rd overall.

=== NBA ===
Vieira played in a total of 26 NBA games with the New Orleans/Oklahoma City Hornets, scoring 50 points. He spent part of the 2006–07 NBA season with the NBA Development League's Tulsa 66ers, for whom he played 13 games. In 2008, he was traded to the Memphis Grizzlies, only to be waived 2 days later.

== National team career ==
Vieira has also been a member of the senior men's Brazilian national basketball team. With Brazil, he has played at the following major tournaments: the 2007 Pan American Games, the 2007 FIBA AmeriCup, the 2010 FIBA World Cup, the 2011 FIBA AmeriCup, the 2012 Summer Olympics, the 2014 FIBA World Cup, the 2015 FIBA AmeriCup, and the 2016 Summer Olympics.

== Career statistics ==
=== NBA ===
==== Regular season ====
Year	Team	GP	GS	MPG	FG%	3P%	FT%	RPG	APG	SPG	BPG	PPG
2006–07	New Orleans/Oklahoma City	13	0	7.9	.467	.429	.714	.8	.4	.2	.1	1.7
2007–08	New Orleans	13	0	5.3	.450	.417	.455	.6	.2	.1	.1	2.2
Career		26	0	6.6	.457	.421	.571	.7	.3	.1	.1	1.9

=== NBB ===
==== Regular season ====
†	Denotes seasons in which Marquinhos won NBB championship
*	Led the league

Season	Team	GP	MPG	2P%	3P%	FT%	RPG	APG	SPG	BPG	PPG
2009	Pinheiros	28	37.8	.563	.363	.812	5.4	4.7	1.7	.3	22.3
2010–11	Pinheiros	27	33.0	.644	.358	.811	3.7	3.4	1.4	.5	20.4
2011–12	Pinheiros	28	31.5	.582	.412	.794	3.8	2.4	1.2	.2	18.0
2012–13†	Flamengo	34	31.0	.617	.433	.795	4.6	2.5	1.2	.2	20.7
2013–14†	Flamengo	16	26.7	.517	.376	.860	3.5	2.4	.9	.3	14.8
2014–15†	Flamengo	28	27.8	.539	.459	.821	4.5	2.6	.9	.2	16.3
2015–16†	Flamengo	28	26.9	.492	.381	.791	3.9	3.1	1.3	.2	15.6
2016–17	Flamengo	27	31.1	.534	.389	.782	3.7	3.3	.7	.1	18.6
2017–18	Flamengo	27	28.6	.636	.371	.790	3.8	3.2	.8	.2	18.6
2018–19†	Flamengo	26	26.9	.561	.383	.821	4.5	3.1	.6	.2	15.4
Career		270	30.4	.576	.393	.804	4.2	3.1	1.1	.2	18.3
All-Star		7	–	–	–	–	–	–	–	–	–

==== Playoffs ====
Season	Team	GP	MPG	2P%	3P%	FT%	RPG	APG	SPG	BPG	PPG
2009	Pinheiros	3	40.0	.472	.571	.789	6.7	5.3	2.3	.0	28.3
2011	Pinheiros	9	36.2	.534	.434	.938	3.7	2.9	1.8	.3	24.7
2012	Pinheiros	10	35.0	.403	.404	.683	4.2	4.4	1.1	.2	15.4
2013†	Flamengo	9	33.0	.540	.429	.857	4.9	3.0	.7	.2	18.6
2014†	Flamengo	9	33.3	.456	.414	.864	2.9	2.1	.7	.0	17.0
2015†	Flamengo	10	27.6	.494	.417	.912	4.6	2.8	1.5	.2	16.9
2016†	Flamengo	13	27.6	.549	.371	.872	4.2	3.2	1.1	.4	16.5
2017	Flamengo	5	29.9	.548	.367	.750	5.8	4.0	1.4	.4	19.4
2018	Flamengo	7	29.4	.472	.350	.789	3.1	4.0	1.0	.0	15.1
2019†	Flamengo	12	30.8	.538	.306	.734	3.8	3.6	1.3	.3	15.7
Career		87	31.7	.503	.396	.822	4.2	3.4	1.2	.2	17.7
