= Shilton dos Santos =

Brazilian professional basketball player (born 1982)

- Shilton on an April, 2010 Playoff game

No. 6 – Minas
- Position: Power forward
- League: NBB

Personal information
- Born: August 10, 1982 (age 44) Cuiabá, Mato Grosso, Brazil
- Listed height: 6 ft 6 in (1.98 m)
- Listed weight: 231 lb (105 kg)

Career history
- 2008–2012: Joinville/JBA
- 2012–2014: Flamengo
- 2014–2016: Minas
- 2016–2018: Bauru
- 2018–2019: Corinthians
- 2019–present: Minas

Shilton Alessanco dos Santos is a Brazilian professional basketball player, who currently plays for Flamengo. He is a small but very strong center, very skilled at getting rebounds, both offensive and defensive. Shilton is also known for his powerful post moves, most of the time successfully drawing a foul. Although not a good free throw shooter (a little below 50% for the 09-10 season), Shilton scores some crucial points at the foul line on the very competitive games in NBB, Brazilian premier league.

== Previous teams ==
As of early 2010, Shilton has played for the following teams:

- Círculo Militar - SP
- Monte Líbano - SP
- Pinheiros - SP
- Londrina - PR
- Campos - RJ
- Araldite/Univille Joinville - SC

== Araldite/Univille - Joinville ==
Shilton has been playing in Joinville since 2005, and is now the team captain. He is very loved by the team's supporters, as he has been on the team longer than any other player on the current squad. In the 2009-2010 season of NBB, Shilton, the starting center for Joinville has scored 209 points in 23 games. He had a great importance on the team's playoffs run in the 08'-09' season, finishing 4th overall with a 0.750 record for the season.

=== Regular season ===
Year	Team	GP	GS	MPG	FG%	3P%	FT%	RPG	APG	SPG	BPG	PPG
2008–2009	Joinville	30	30	35.4	.584	.000	.583	11.9	2.7	N/A	0.7	12.4
2009–2010	Joinville	25	25	28.4	.486	.000	.441	7.7	1.76	0.84	0.36	8.8
2010–2011	Joinville	26	26	27.4	N/A	.000	N/A	7.8	1.8	0.6	0.2	8.5
2011–2012	Joinville	28	28	27.2	N/A	.000	.605	7.0	1.0	0.9	0.2	10.6

=== Playoffs ===
Year	Team	GP	GS	MPG	FG%	3P%	FT%	RPG	APG	SPG	BPG	PPG
2008–09	Joinville	7	7	36.7	.461	.000	.571	12.4	4.1	N/A	0.7	11.9
2009–10	Joinville	6	6	0	.000	.000	.000	0	0	0	0	8.3
