= Guilherme Giovannoni =

Brazilian-Italian basketball player

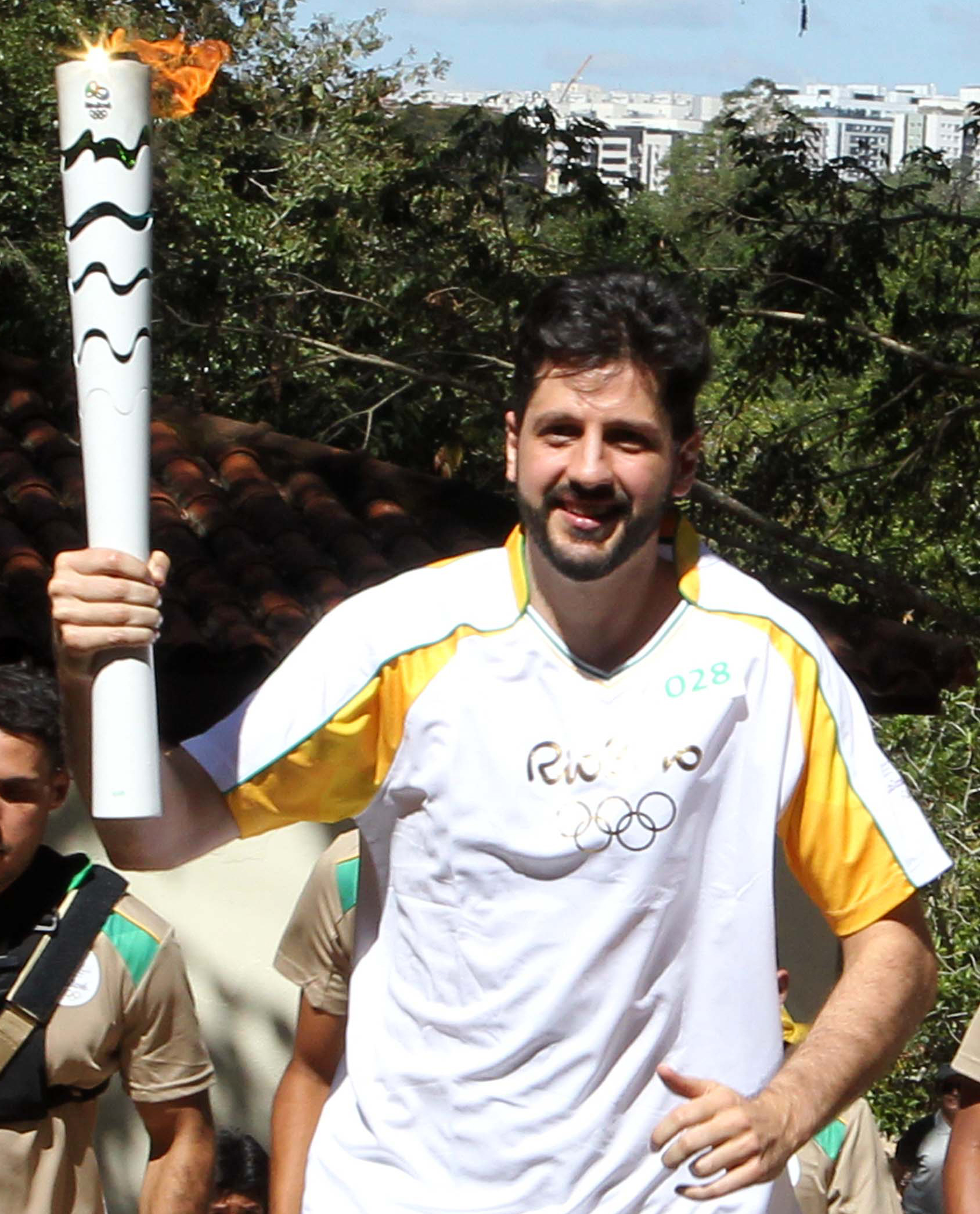
- Giovannoni carrying the 2016 Summer Olympics torch

Personal information
- Born: June 2, 1980 (age 46) Piracicaba, Brazil
- Listed height: 6 ft 8.5 in (2.04 m)
- Listed weight: 232 lb (105 kg)

Career information
- Playing career: 1997–2019
- Position: Power forward
- Number: 12

Career history
- 1997–2000: Pinheiros
- 2000–2001: Fuenlabrada
- 2001: Gijón
- 2001–2002: Pinheiros
- 2002: COC Ribeirão Preto
- 2002–2006: Benetton Treviso
- 2002–2003: → Crabs Rimini
- 2003–2004: → Biella
- 2004–2005: → Kyiv
- 2006–2009: Virtus Bologna
- 2009–2017: Brasília
- 2017–2018: Vasco da Gama
- 2018–2019: Corinthians

Career highlights
- FIBA EuroChallenge champion (2009); Italian League champion (2006); Italian Cup winner (2004); 3× FIBA South American League champion (2010, 2013, 2015); 2× FIBA South American League MVP (2010, 2013); 3× Brazilian League champion (2010–2012); Brazilian League MVP (2011); 2× Brazilian League Finals MVP (2011, 2012); 4× All-Brazilian League Team (2010–2012, 2015); 6× Brazilian All-Star (2010–2015)
Medals
Men's basketball
Representing Brazil
FIBA AmeriCup
Gold medal – first place	2005 Santo Domingo
Gold medal – first place	2009 San Juan
Silver medal – second place	2001 Neuquén
Silver medal – second place	2011 Mar del Plata
Pan American Games
Gold medal – first place	1999 Winnipeg
Gold medal – first place	2003 Santo Domingo
FIBA South American Championship
Gold medal – first place	2003 Montevideo
Silver medal – second place	2001 Valdivia

Guilherme Giovannoni (born June 2, 1980) is a Brazilian former professional basketball player. He played at the power forward position for several clubs in Brazil and Europe. Currently, he is a commentator on the National Basketball Association and Novo Basquete Brasil for ESPN Brasil.

== Professional career ==
During his pro career, Giovannoni has played with UniCEUB/BRB and several other clubs in the top-tier level Brazilian League.

== National team career ==
Giovannoni has competed with the senior men's Brazilian national basketball team, at the 2002, 2006, 2010, and 2014 FIBA World Cups. He was also a part of the Brazilian teams at the 2012 Summer Olympics, and the 2016 Summer Olympics.
