= Nilson Nelson Gymnasium =

Indoor sports arena in Brasília, Brazil

Arena BRB Nilson Nelson
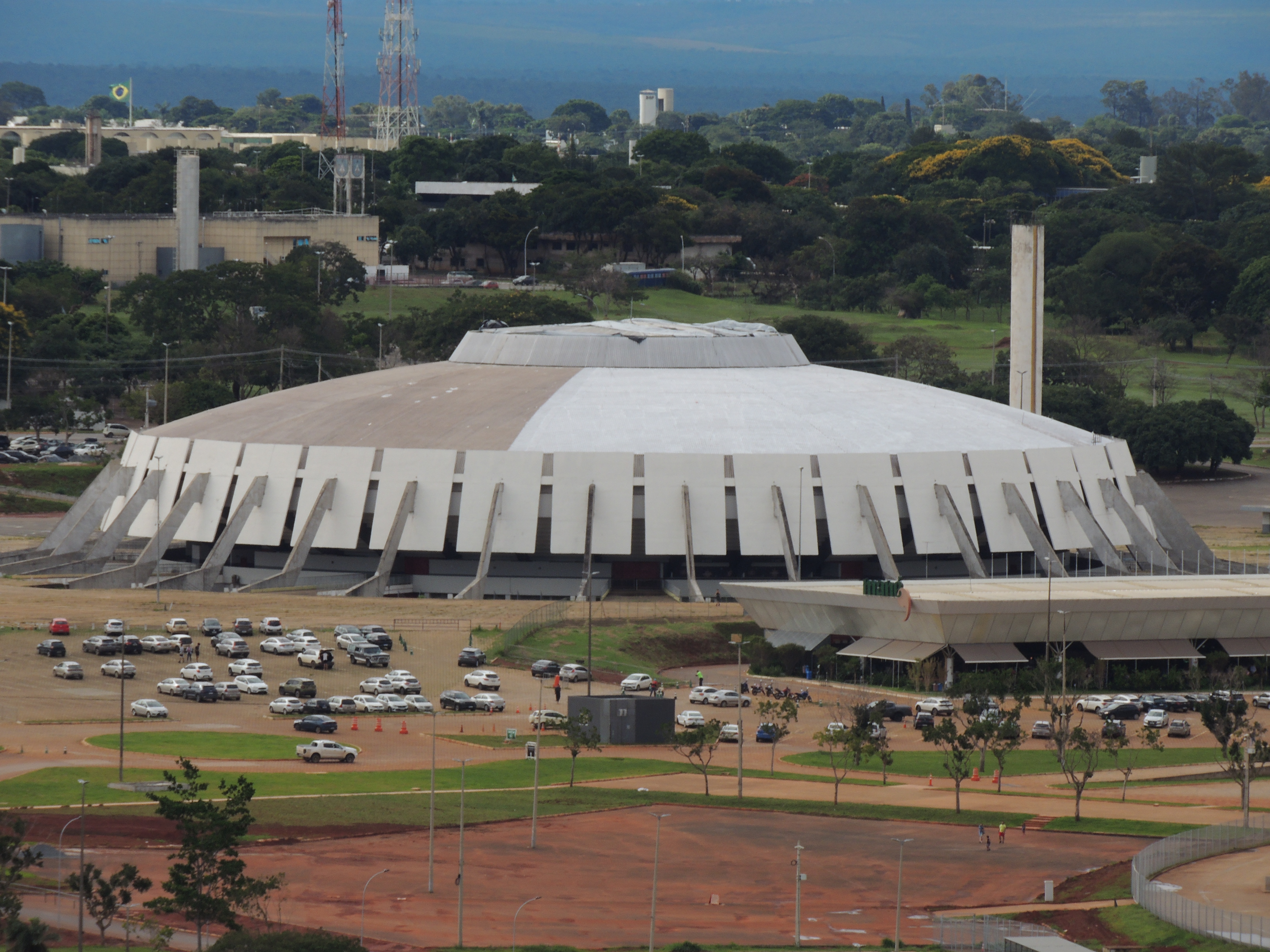
- Interactive map of Arena BRB Nilson Nelson
- Full name: Arena BRB Nilson Nelson
- Former names: Ginásio de Esportes Presidente Médici
- Location: Brasília, Brazil
- Coordinates: 15°46′59″S 47°54′11″W
- Owner: Federal District
- Operator: Distrito Federal Sports Departament
- Capacity: 24,286 seats (1973–2008); 16,600 seats (2008–2016); 11,105 seats (2017–present)

Construction
- Opened: 21 April 1973; 53 years ago
- Renovated: 2008; 18 years ago
- Architects: Cláudio Cianciarullo; Ícaro de Castro Mello; Eduardo de Castro Mello

The Nilson Nelson Gymnasium (Ginásio Nilson Nelson) is an indoor sporting arena used mostly for volleyball located in Brasília, Brazil, which is near the Estádio Nacional Mané Garrincha. Both are part of the Ayrton Senna Sports Complex. The capacity of the arena is 11,105 spectators and it was built in 1973. It is one of the arenas used by the Universo Basketball team.

The hall was designed by Cláudio Cianciarullo and opened on April 21, 1973. From 1973 to 2008, the arena had a capacity of 24,286 seats. In 2008, the multi-purpose arena was renovated and reduced the spectator capacity to 11,105 seats. It is used mainly for indoor sports, and was the secondary venue at 2008 FIFA Futsal World Cup.

== Concerts and events ==
- A-ha – 2010 (5,500)
- Black Eyed Peas – 2006 (14,000)
- Bob Dylan – 2012
- Eric Clapton – 1990 (24,000)
- The Cranberries – 2010 (10,000)
- Deep Purple – 1997
- Green Day – 2010 (9,500)
- David Guetta – 2010
- Duran Duran – 2012
- Guns N' Roses – 2014 (11,000)
- Jackson 5, The Jackson 5 World Tour – 22 September 1974
- Avril Lavigne – 2011 (16,600)
- McFly – 2009 (8,000)
- Megadeth – 2010 (13,000)
- Alanis Morissette – 2009
- Motörhead – 2010 (5,500)
- Ozzy Osbourne– 2010 (8,000)
- Paramore – 2011 (11,000)
- Scorpions – 2010 (11,532)
- RBD – 2007 (14,000)
- RBD – 2008 (15,000)
- Rihanna – 2011 (13,500)
- Roxette – 2012
- Sade – 2011
- Seal – 2011 (3,500)
- Shakira – 1996 (21,000), 2011 (16,000)
- UFC Fight Night: Bigfoot vs. Arlovski (UFC Fight Night 51) – September 13, 2014 (8,822)
- UFC Fight Night: Cyborg vs. Länsberg (UFC Fight Night 95) – September 24, 2016 (8,410)
- UFC Fight Night: Lee vs. Oliveira (UFC Fight Night 170) – March 14, 2020 (0)
- Iron Maiden, The Book of Souls World Tour – 22 March 2016 (13,500)

American superstar Miley Cyrus was scheduled to perform in the Gymnasium on September 24, 2014 as part of her highly anticipated, Bangerz World Tour but was cancelled due to logistical issues.

== See also ==
- List of indoor arenas in Brazil
