= Larry Taylor (basketball) =

American-Brazilian basketball player

No. 4 – Bauru
- Position: Point guard / shooting guard
- League: NBB

Personal information
- Born: October 3, 1980 (age 46) Chicago, Illinois
- Listed height: 5 ft 11.5 in (1.82 m)
- Listed weight: 205 lb (93 kg)

Career information
- High school: Rich Central (Olympia Fields, Illinois)
- College: South Suburban College (1999–2001); Missouri Western (2001–2003)
- NBA draft: 2003: undrafted
- Playing career: 1997–present

Career history
- 2004: Chicago Soldiers
- 2004: San Antonio All Stars
- 2005: La Huacana
- 2006: Frayles de Guasave
- 2006: Lobos Grises de la UAD
- 2007: Guaiqueríes de Margarita
- 2007: Marineros de Cozumel
- 2008: Lobos UAD de Mazatlán
- 2008–2015: Bauru
- 2015–2018: Mogi das Cruzes
- 2018–present: Bauru

Career highlights
- LDA champion (2015); 3× LSB champion (2014, 2016, 2022); 2× All-Brazilian League Team (2009, 2011); 8× Brazilian All-Star (2009–2013, 2016, 2018, 2022); 3× Campeonato Paulista champion (2013, 2014, 2016); 1× Interligas champion (2019); No. 4 retired by Bauru
Medals
Men's basketball
Representing Brazil
Pan American Games
Gold medal – first place	2015 Toronto

Larry James Taylor Junior, also commonly known simply as Larry in Brazil (born October 3, 1980), is an American-Brazilian professional basketball player. At a height of 1.82 m (6 ft 0 in) tall, he can play either the point guard or shooting guard position, with point guard being his main position. He also represented the senior Brazilian national basketball team. While he was a player of Bauru, he received the nickname "Alienígena" ('Alien'), because of his skills with the basketball.

== Professional career ==
Taylor first came to Brazil in 2008, to play with Bauru Basket. On the São Paulo State's team, he became one of the most important players in Brazil, helping the team to win major championships such as the FIBA Americas League (Latin America's version of the EuroLeague) and to reach the top-tier level Brazilian League's (NBB) finals, becoming a local idol. He also competed at the 2015 FIBA Intercontinental Cup with Bauru, where they lost in the finals to the at the time defending EuroLeague champions Real Madrid.

After 7 years with Bauru, Taylor joined Mogi das Cruzes of the top-tier Brazilian League. In his first game back with Bauru, his former team retired his number 4 jersey.

Eventually, Taylor would return to Bauru after three years away playing for Mogi das Cruzes.

== National team career ==
In 2012, Taylor received Brazilian nationality, and thus became able to represent the senior Brazilian national basketball team at major tournaments. Taylor went on to play with Brazil at the 2012 Summer Olympics, the 2013 FIBA AmeriCup, and the 2014 FIBA World Cup. In 2015, he won the gold medal at the 2015 Pan American Games, in Toronto.

He was ultimately left out of the final roster list of Brazil's national team for the 2016 Summer Olympics, in Rio de Janeiro.

== Career statistics ==
=== Regular season ===
Season	Team	GP	MPG	FG%	3PT%	FT%	RPG	APG	SPG	BPG	PPG
2008–09	Bauru	28	36.4	.493	.339	.842	6.8	6.3	2.6	.4	19.3
2009–10	Bauru	26	34.9	.492	.427	.768	5.7	5.7	2.0	.3	16.2
2010–11	Bauru	28	32.1	.494	.347	.720	5.0	5.6	1.9	.1	13.7
2011–12	Bauru	28	34.4	.516	.329	.852	5.4	6.7	2.0	.3	16.5
2012–13	Bauru	32	34.3	.501	.347	.895	4.9	4.3	1.8	.2	14.6
2013–14	Bauru	29	31.3	.491	.364	.792	5.7	3.8	1.3	.2	13.8
2014–15	Bauru	30	26.0	.493	.282	.789	4.2	2.7	1.3	.1	9.7
2015–16	Mogi das Cruzes	28	28.9	.431	.303	.784	4.4	4.4	2.0	.1	11.6
2016–17	Mogi das Cruzes	24	27.2	.425	.298	.784	4.3	4.5	1.9	.2	9.8
2017–18	Mogi das Cruzes	26	30.1	.424	.347	.786	4.7	4.8	1.8	.1	11.5
2018–19	Bauru	17	26.1	.439	.347	.840	3.6	3.4	1.4	.1	10.1
2019–20	Bauru	11	23.7	.439	.375	.727	3.4	1.9	1.1	.0	9.2
2020–21	Bauru	30	24.8	.403	.352	.935	2.7	2.8	0.9	.0	7.9
2021–22	Bauru	29	31.4	.465	.384	.864	4.2	3.7	1.1	.2	14.8
2022–23	Bauru	32	20.7	.467	.331	.696	2.1	2.0	0.7	.0	7.0
Career		398	31.1	.471	.347	.816	4.7	4.4	1.6	.1	13.0

=== Playoffs ===
Season	Team	GP	MPG	FG%	3PT%	FT%	RPG	APG	SPG	BPG	PPG
2009	Bauru	3	34.8	.367	.417	.833	2.7	3.7	2.3	.3	15.7
2010	Bauru	6	36.0	.563	.423	.833	5.2	4.7	1.5	.5	22.2
2011	Bauru	7	36.5	.568	.320	.774	4.6	7.0	1.9	.4	15.1
2012	Bauru	6	35.8	.410	.355	.795	6.0	5.5	1.3	.2	19.0
2013	Bauru	8	38.1	.427	.387	.800	4.9	4.4	1.1	.0	15.0
2014	Bauru	7	31.2	.367	.280	1.000	5.1	3.7	1.9	.3	9.4
2015	Bauru	12	30.6	.421	.231	.844	5.4	3.3	1.4	.2	9.2
2016	Mogi das Cruzes	12	28.5	.428	.200	.674	4.3	2.8	1.1	.3	11.1
2017	Mogi das Cruzes	5	33.1	.457	.286	.769	3.6	4.8	1.8	.0	12.8
2018	Mogi das Cruzes	12	33.2	.395	.303	.900	6.3	4.3	1.6	.1	12.8
2019	Bauru	6	29.8	.430	.250	.727	5.3	2.3	1.5	.0	11.8
2021	Bauru	5	11.7	.383	.300	1.000	2.4	1.6	.2	.0	3.6
2022	Bauru	6	31.0	.511	.467	.929	3.8	1.8	.3	.2	14.8
2023	Bauru	7	13.2	.286	.222	.844	0.9	0.6	0.4	.0	2.4
Career		102	30.3	.473	.315	.799	4.3	3.3	1.3	.2	12.2

== Personal ==
Taylor is married to Erika Nicole Taylor, a Kansas City, Missouri activist and philanthropist. He is friends with Dwyane Wade and his brother since young.

He became a naturalized Brazilian citizen in 2012 in order to play for Brazil at the 2012 Summer Olympics. In Brazil Taylor have started his rapper career.

Taylor is a supporter of Corinthians in Brazil and usually choose this team to play FIFA.
