= Diego Pinheiro =

Brazilian basketball player

Medal record

Men's basketball

Representing Brazil

FIBA AmeriCup
Gold medal – first place	2009 San Juan	

Diego Pinheiro da Silva, commonly known as Diego Pinheiro, or simply as Diego (born June 14, 1980 in Brazil) is a Brazilian professional basketball player. He is a 6'5" (1.95 m) swingman.

== Professional career ==
Pinheiro has played professionally with Winner Limeira of Novo Basquete Brasil.

== National team career ==
Pinheiro is also a member of the Brazilian national basketball team.

Pinheiro made his debut for the senior team at the 2008 South American Championship, averaging 5.8 points and 2.7 assists per game for the team. He also competed for the gold-medal winning Brazilian team at the FIBA Americas Championship 2009, seeing action in five games off the bench for the Brazilians.

Previously, Pinheiro competed for the junior national team at the 1999 World Championship for Junior Men as a 19-year-old. He was the team's second leading scorer, and helped the Brazilians to an eighth-place finish in the tournament.
