= Unitri/Uberlândia =

Unitri Uberlândia
- Leagues: NBB
- Founded: 1998; 28 years ago
- Arena: Arena Tancredo Neves; Ginásio Homero Santos
- Capacity: 6,000; 3,000
- Location: Uberlândia, Brazil
- Team colors: White, Blue and Red
- Championships: 1 FIBA South American League; 1 Brazilian Championship
Home	Away

Uberlândia Tênis Clube is a Brazilian professional basketball team from Uberlândia, Minas Gerais, Brazil. It is also known as Unitri/Uberlândia, due to a partnership with the university Unitri, which is located in Uberlândia. Unitri/Uberlândia is one of the teams of the Novo Basquete Brasil (NBB), the top-tier level Brazilian basketball league.

== History ==
Unitri/Uberlândia was founded in 1998, with the arrival of the head coach Ary Vidal and since its foundation, the team receives financial support from the university Unitri. In 2004, the team from Minas Gerais won its first title, winning the Brazilian Championship. They beat Flamengo in the league's finals, 3–0. In 2005, when Uberlândia defended its national title, the team was defeated by Telemar/Rio de Janeiro, where the small forward Marcelinho Machado played.

Two years later, Unitri was eliminated in the league's semifinal series by Franca. In the 2010–11 and 2011–12 NBB seasons, the team was defeated in the league's quarterfinals playoff series, by Brasília and Flamengo, respectively.

== Roster ==
Note: Flags indicate national team eligibility at FIBA-sanctioned events. Players may hold other non-FIBA nationalities not displayed.

Unitri Uberlândia roster
Players
Coaches

Pos.	No.	Nat.	Name	Ht.
F/C	3	(United States)	Mims, O'Neal	2.08 m (6 ft 10 in)
G	4	(Brazil)	Silva, Rafael	1.95 m (6 ft 5 in)
G	5	(Brazil)	Lima, Hélio	1.87 m (6 ft 2 in)
G	7	(Brazil)	Parisotto, Ícaro	1.85 m (6 ft 1 in)
F	8	(Brazil)	Xavier, Luan	1.87 m (6 ft 2 in)
G	9	(United States)	Brown, Caleb	1.85 m (6 ft 1 in)
G/F	11	(Uruguay)	Taboada, Emilio	1.93 m (6 ft 4 in)
C	12	(Brazil)	Miranda, Leandro	2.05 m (6 ft 9 in)
F	14	(Brazil)	Silva, Olintho	2.01 m (6 ft 7 in)
C	15	(Brazil)	dos Santos, Douglas	2.04 m (6 ft 8 in)
F	20	(Brazil)	Gruber, Luis	2.05 m (6 ft 9 in)
G/F	22	(Brazil)	Parisotto, Audrei	1.95 m (6 ft 5 in)
F/C	23	(Brazil)	Silva, Rodrigo César	2.05 m (6 ft 9 in)
F	25	(Brazil)	Teló, Vinícius	2.02 m (6 ft 8 in)
C	26	(Brazil)	Leichtweis, Renan	2.11 m (6 ft 11 in)
F	32	(Brazil)	Zanini, Ricardo	1.98 m (6 ft 6 in)

Head coach

- (Argentina) Carlos Romano

Assistant coach(es)

- (Brazil) José Ricardo Lima

Legend

- (C) Team captain
- Injured

- Roster
Updated: 2015-02-24

== Honors and titles ==
=== Continental ===
- FIBA South American League
  - Champions (1): 2005
  - Runners-up (1): 2004
- South American Club Championship
  - Runners-up (1): 2005

=== National ===
- Brazilian Championship
  - Champions (1): 2004
  - Runners-up (3): 2003, 2005, 2013

=== Regional ===
- Minas Gerais State League
  - Champions (14): 1998, 1999, 2000, 2001, 2002, 2003, 2004, 2005, 2006, 2010, 2011, 2012, 2013, 2014

== Head coaches ==
- (Brazil) Ary Ventura Vidal
- (Brazil) Milton "Carioquinha" Setrini
- (Brazil) Hélio Rubens Garcia
- (Brazil) Ricardo "Cadum" Guimarães
- (Brazil) Ênio Ângelo Vecchi
- (Brazil) André "Ratto" Luís Guimarães Fonseca
