= Joinville Basquete Associados =

Cia. Do Terno/Romaço/Joinville
- Leagues: NBB
- Founded: 2003
- Arena: Ginásio Ivan Rodrigues (capacity: 3,500)
- Location: Joinville, Santa Catarina, Brazil
- Team colors: White, Black and Red
- President: (Brazil) Leonardo Roesler
- Head coach: (Brazil) Ênio Vecchi
- Website: www.basquetedejoinville.com.br
Home	Away

Joinville Basquete Associados, now called Cia. do Terno/Romaço/Joinville, is a professional basketball team from Joinville, Brazil that plays in the Novo Basquete Brasil league. In NBB's first season (2008–2009), Joinville finished 4th overall, out of 15 teams from all over Brazil. Before entering the 2009-2010 season playoffs, Joinville was placed 5th on the regular season (15-11).

== Roster ==
=== Current roster ===
Cia. do Terno/Romaço/Joinville roster
Players
Coaches

Pos.	No.	Nat.	Name	Ht.
PG	4	(Brazil)	Medeiros, Henrique	1.83 m (6 ft 0 in)
C	7	(Brazil)	Probst, Ricardo (C)	2.00 m (6 ft 7 in)
SF	8	(Brazil)	Cunha, Durval	2.01 m (6 ft 7 in)
PG	11	(Brazil)	Veber, Romarinho	1.81 m (5 ft 11 in)
SG	12	(United States)	Garner, Milton	1.85 m (6 ft 1 in)
SF	15	(Brazil)	Conceição, Diego	2.01 m (6 ft 7 in)
PF	21	(Brazil)	Scholz, Renato	1.97 m (6 ft 6 in)
SF	22	(Brazil)	Vierne, Erick	1.95 m (6 ft 5 in)
SF	25	(Brazil)	Teló, Vinicius	2.03 m (6 ft 8 in)
F/C	33	(Brazil)	Moreira, Abner	2.05 m (6 ft 9 in)
C	40	(Brazil)	Martins, João Carlos	2.10 m (6 ft 11 in)

Head coach

- TBD

Assistant coach(es)

- (Brazil) Annibal de Oliveira Júnior

Legend

- (C) Team captain
- Injured

- Roster
Updated: 2010-07-06

== Arena ==
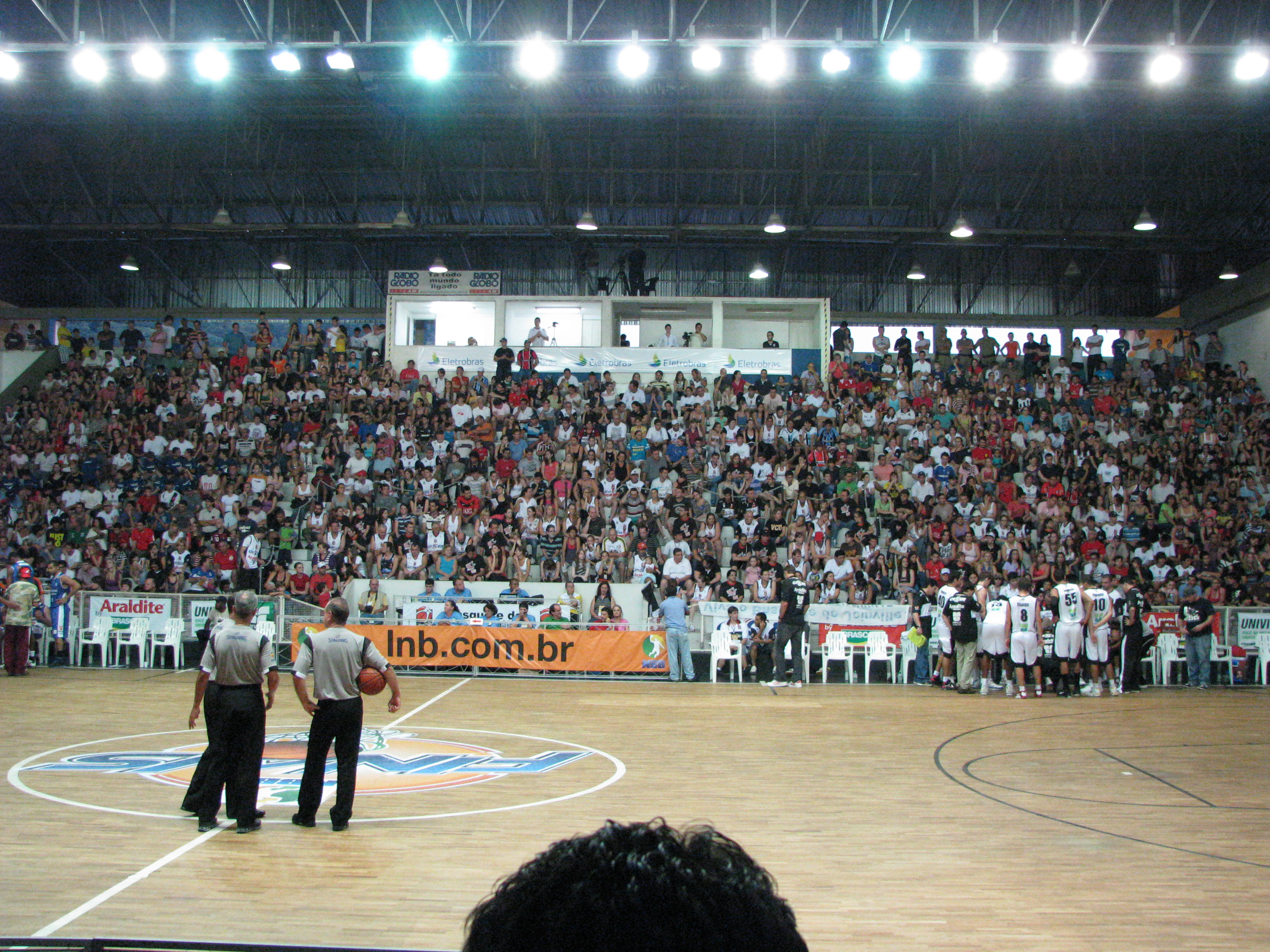
Ginásio Ivan Rodrigues full at a 2010 NBB Playoff game

Cia. do Terno/Romaço/Joinville plays at Ginásio Ivan Rodrigues, that has a capacity of 3500 spectators.

== 2009-2010 Season ==
In late 2009, Joinville had won many games in the first round of the Novo Basquete Brasil, being the last team to lose its undefeated status in the season. In the first round, Joinville defeated both Flamengo and Brasília, the two teams that would compete in the finals. However, coming back from the Christmas/New Year's break, the team was not able to connect like they did in the first round. Joinville's second round started off with some bad losses to teams that had much worse records in the season. The year of 2010 was not particularly good for Joinville. The team fell apart, and fell from second overall to fifth, not making it to the quarter-finals. Joinville played Vila Velha/CETAF for a spot on the quarterfinals. CETAF, the 12th overall, did not cause much trouble to Joinville, and the team from Santa Catarina was able to advance in a quick 3-0 playoff win. In the second game of the series, the starting point guard for Joinville, Manteguinha, was hurt after getting a rebound only 27 seconds in the game. He ended up hurting his back, but returned for the next series against the 4th-seeded Minas Tênis Clube. The first game of this series was played in Joinville, and even with a great number of supporters attending, the team had a very difficult objective to achieve, and ended up losing the first game 72-76. However, in the regular season, Joinville beat Minas in a road game, so the hopes were still alive. The second game ended up giving Minas a 2-0 lead in the series, and a very high chance of advancing, as the third game would be played at Minas' home arena. Even with Joinville's efforts to bring the series back to the Ivan Rodrigues arena, the team's failure to connect with perimeter shooting held back Joinville's score. The game ended with a 94-90 win for Minas, and therefore ending Joinville's run in the 2010 NBB.

== 2010-2011 Season ==
For the 2011 season, Ciser did not renew its contract to sponsor the team, but fellow sponsor Araldite took over Ciser's spot as main sponsor, allowing the team to continue alive in the NBB. At the end of the previous season, the only player who had a contract for the following season was team captain Shilton. Right after the team's elimination to Minas, it was announced that Jefferson Sobral, Marcão and Rômulo would not have their contracts extended. Five players were immediately confirmed for 2011: C/PF João Victor, PF Augusto, SF Bristott, SF Audrei and PG Espiga. In mid-May, EC Pinheiros announced a deal with former starting shooting guard André Góes, then obligating Joinville to look for a good replacement to the key member of the squad. That replacement for the SG position ended up being former starting PG Manteguinha, and the team later hired PG Paulinho Boracini, who played for EC Paulistano in the 09-10 season. Another big deal for the team was the deal with CR Flamengo, which brought center Fernando Coloneze to the team, filling a need for a big man inside, as the two centers weren't very tall and the team needed more points in the paint. Espiga, who was a very good option off the bench, retired a couple of months before NBB3 started, in a game between Araldite/Univille and a team made up of his friends. Fans filled the stadium, generating a lot of donations in food to the poor in Joinville. Three other big deals brought Luis Gruber, Renato Scholz and Guilherme Schneider to Joinville. Gruber had played for many years in Europe, and he's getting a lot of minutes in Bial's rotation. Renato is a very athletic player, with very explosive dunks ingame. Scholz entered for the Jogo das Estrelas Slam Dunk competition, to compete with other players of NBB3.
