= FIBA Americas League Final 4 =

The FIBA Americas League Final 4 is the final four format final championship stage of the Latin American top-tier level FIBA Americas League (Portuguese: FIBA Liga das Américas, Spanish: FIBA Liga de las Américas) professional club basketball competition.

It culminates with the FIBA Americas League Grand Final. The first FIBA Americas League Final Four was held in 2008, in Mexicali, Mexico.

== FIBA Americas League Final Fours and Grand Finals ==
FIBA Americas League Final Four
| Year | Host City | FIBA Americas League Grand Final | | | | |
| Year | Host City | Champion | Score | Second Place | Third Place | Fourth Place |
| 2008; Details | Mexicali | (Argentina); Peñarol | League stage | (Mexico); Soles de Mexicali | (United States); Miami Tropics | (Brazil); Minas |
| 2009; Details | Xalapa | (Brazil); Brasília | League stage | (Mexico); Halcones UV Xalapa | (Uruguay); Biguá | (Brazil); Minas |
| 2010; Details | Mar del Plata | (Argentina); Peñarol | League stage | (Venezuela); Espartanos de Margarita | (Mexico); Halcones UV Xalapa | (Argentina); Quimsa |
| 2011; Details | Xalapa | (Argentina); Regatas Corrientes | League stage | (Puerto Rico); Capitanes de Arecibo | (Mexico); Halcones UV Xalapa | (Mexico); Halcones Rojos |
| 2012; Details | Formosa | (Mexico); Pioneros de Quintana Roo | League stage | (Argentina); La Unión | (Argentina); Obras Sanitarias | (Brazil); Brasília |
| 2013; Details | Arecibo | (Brazil); Pinheiros | League stage | (Argentina); Lanús | (Puerto Rico); Capitanes de Arecibo | (Brazil); Brasília |
| 2014; Details | Rio | (Brazil); Flamengo | 85–78 | (Brazil); Pinheiros | (Uruguay); Aguada | (Mexico); Halcones UV Xalapa |
| 2015; Details | Rio | (Brazil); Bauru | 86–72 | (Mexico); Pioneros de Quintana Roo | (Brazil); Flamengo | (Argentina); Peñarol |
| 2016; Details | Barquisimeto | (Venezuela); Guaros de Lara | 84–79 | (Brazil); Bauru | (Brazil); Mogi das Cruzes | (Brazil); Flamengo |
| 2017; Details | Barquisimeto | (Venezuela); Guaros de Lara | 88–65 | (Argentina); Weber Bahía Blanca | (Puerto Rico); Leones de Ponce | (Mexico); Fuerza Regia |
| 2018; Details | Buenos Aires | (Argentina); San Lorenzo | 79–71 | (Brazil); Mogi das Cruzes | (Argentina); Regatas Corrientes | (Argentina); Estudiantes Concordia |

=== By club ===
FIBA Americas League Final Fours By Club
| Team | Champion | Second place | Third place | Fourth place |
|---|---|---|---|---|
| (Argentina) Peñarol | 2× (2008, 2010) | | | (2015) |
| (Venezuela) Guaros de Lara | 2× (2016, 2017) | | | |
| (Brazil) Bauru | (2015) | (2016) | | |
| (Brazil) Pinheiros | (2013) | (2014) | | |
| (Mexico) Pioneros de Quintana Roo | (2012) | (2015) | | |
| (Brazil) Flamengo | (2014) | | (2015) | (2016) |
| (Argentina) Regatas Corrientes | (2011) | | (2018) | |
| (Brazil) Brasília | (2009) | | | (2012, 2013) |
| (Argentina) San Lorenzo de Almagro | (2018) | | | |
| (Mexico) Halcones UV Xalapa | | (2009) | (2010, 2011) | (2014) |
| (Puerto Rico) Capitanes de Arecibo | | (2011) | (2013) | |
| (Brazil) Mogi das Cruzes | | (2018) | (2016) | |
| (Mexico) Soles de Mexicali | | (2008) | | |
| (Venezuela) Espartanos de Margarita | | (2010) | | |
| (Argentina) La Unión de Formosa | | (2012) | | |
| (Argentina) Lanús | | (2013) | | |
| (Argentina) Weber Bahía Blanca | | (2017) | | |
| (United States) Miami Tropics | | | (2008) | |
| (Uruguay) Biguá | | | (2009) | |
| (Argentina) Obras Sanitarias | | | (2012) | |
| (Uruguay) Aguada | | | (2014) | |
| (Puerto Rico) Leones de Ponce | | | (2017) | |
| (Brazil) Minas | | | | (2008, 2009) |
| (Argentina) Quimsa | | | | (2010) |
| (Mexico) Halcones Rojos | | | | (2011) |
| (Mexico) Fuerza Regia | | | | (2017) |
| (Argentina) Estudiantes Concordia | | | | (2018) |

=== By country ===
FIBA Americas League Final Fours By Country
| Nation | Champion | Second place | Third place | Fourth place |
|---|---|---|---|---|
| Brazil | 4× | 3× | 2× | 5× |
| Argentina | 4× | 3× | 2× | 3× |
| Venezuela | 2× | 1 | 0 | 0 |
| Mexico | 1 | 3× | 2× | 3× |
| Puerto Rico | 0 | 1 | 2× | 0 |
| Uruguay | 0 | 0 | 2× | 0 |
| United States | 0 | 0 | 1 | 0 |

=== FIBA Americas League Grand Finals MVPs ===
FIBA Americas League Grand Finals MVPs
| Year | Grand Final MVP | Team |
|---|---|---|
| 2008 | (United States); Quincy Wadley | (Argentina); Peñarol de Mar del Plata |
| 2009 | (Brazil); Alex Garcia | (Brazil); Brasília |
| 2010 | (United States); Kyle LaMonte | (Argentina); Peñarol de Mar del Plata |
| 2011 | (Argentina); Federico Kammerichs | (Argentina); Regatas Corrientes |
| 2012 | (United States) – (Mexico); Chris Hernández | (Mexico); Pioneros de Quintana Roo |
| 2013 | (United States); Shamell Stallworth | (Brazil); Pinheiros |
| 2014 | (Brazil); Marcelinho Machado | (Brazil); Flamengo |
| 2015 | (Brazil); Alex Garcia (2×) | (Brazil); Bauru |
| 2016 | (United States); Damien Wilkins | (Venezuela); Guaros de Lara |
| 2017 | (United States); Zach Graham | (Venezuela); Guaros de Lara |
| 2018 | (Argentina); Gabriel Deck | (Argentina); San Lorenzo de Almagro |
| 2019 | (Jordan); Dar Tucker | (Argentina); San Lorenzo de Almagro |

== See also ==
- FIBA Americas League
- FIBA Americas League Awards
