= 2007–08 FIBA Americas League =

FIBA Americas League 2007–08
- League: FIBA Americas League
- Sport: Basketball
- Duration: December 4, 2007 – February 9, 2008
- Top scorer: (United States) Quincy Wadley (Peñarol de Mar del Plata)

Finals
- Champions: (Argentina) Peñarol de Mar del Plata
- Runners-up: (Mexico) Soles de Mexicali
- Grand Final MVP: (United States) Quincy Wadley (Peñarol de Mar del Plata)

FIBA Americas League seasons
- 2008–09 →

The 2007–08 FIBA Americas League was the first edition of the first-tier and most important professional international club basketball competition in the regions of South America, Central America, the Caribbean, and Mexico, with the winner of the competition being crowned as the best team and champion of all of those regions, as well as of the FIBA Americas zone. The first FIBA Americas League also included two teams from the United States, the Miami Tropics, and the PBL All-Stars, which was an All-Star selection team from the Premier Basketball League.

The competition began on December 4. The first stage was a round robin phase with four teams in each group. Each of the groups were played in different cities, (Guaynabo, Miami, Belo Horizonte, and Mar del Plata). The Final 4 of the league was played in a round-robin format from February 7 to February 9, in Mexicali, Mexico, home of the hosting team, Soles de Mexicali.

== Teams ==
Group phase
(Argentina) Boca Juniors (1st)	(Brazil) Brasília (1st)	(Mexico) Soles de Mexicali (1st)	(United States) Miami Tropics (ABA)
(Argentina) Peñarol Mar del Plata (2nd)	(Brazil) Flamengo (2nd)	(Mexico) Halcones de Xalapa (2nd)	(United States) Premier Basketball League All Stars (PBL)
(Argentina) Libertad Sunchales^{LSH}(3d)	(Brazil) Minas Tênis (WC)	(Mexico) Fuerza Regia (WC)	(Puerto Rico) Cangrejeros de Santurce (1st)
(Dominican Republic) Metros de Santiago (1st)	(Uruguay) Defensor Sporting (WC)	(Chile) Liceo Mixto (1st)	(Puerto Rico) Capitanes de Arecibo (2nd)

The labels in the parentheses show how each team qualified for the place of its starting round (TH: Americas League title holders, LSH: Liga Sudamerican title holders):

- LC: Qualified through a licensed club with a long-term licence
- 1st, 2nd, etc.: League position after Playoffs

== Group stage ==
Key to colors
Top two places advanced to Quarterfinals

=== Group A (Guaynabo) ===
Pos	Team	Pld	W	L	PF	PA	PD
1.	(Mexico) Soles de Mexicali	3	3	0	248	227	+21
2.	(Puerto Rico) Cangrejeros de Santurce	3	2	1	262	210	+52
3.	(United States) PBL All-Stars	3	1	2	238	267	−29
4.	(Dominican Republic) Metros de Santiago	3	0	3	236	280	−44

December 4, 2007

Boxscore

PBL All-Stars (United States)	95–91	(Dominican Republic) Metros de Santiago
Scoring by quarter: 9–22, 32–22, 28–25, 26–22
Pts: Tatum 18; Rebs: Pradia 11; Asts: Pérez Tejeda 5		Pts: Curbelo 23; Rebs: Solano 10; Asts: Ramírez Arias, Lenderborg 6

Mario Morales Coliseum, Guaynabo

December 4, 2007

Boxscore

Cangrejeros de Santurce (Puerto Rico)	74–75	(Mexico) Soles de Mexicali
Scoring by quarter: 15–22, 9–17, 24–16, 26–20
Pts: Falcon Meléndez 19; Rebs: Dalmau 14; Asts: Dalmau 3		Pts: Wheat 23; Rebs: Penny 10; Asts: Wheat 5

Mario Morales Coliseum, Guaynabo

December 6, 2007

Boxscore

Metros de Santiago (Dominican Republic)	83–94	(Mexico) Soles de Mexicali
Scoring by quarter: 15–25, 16–29, 29–17, 23–23
Pts: Solano 15; Rebs: Solano 8 Asts: Ramírez Arias 6		Pts: Penny 25; Rebs: Llamas 12; Asts: Wheat 6

Mario Morales Coliseum, Guaynabo

December 6, 2007

Boxscore

PBL All-Stars (United States)	73–97	(Puerto Rico) Cangrejeros de Santurce
Scoring by quarter: 16–25, 21–24, 9–20, 27–28
Pts: Tatum 17; Rebs: Pradia 13; Asts: Russell 3		Pts: Falcon Meléndez 19; Rebs: Falcon Meléndez 9 Asts: Falcon Meléndez, Santiago 5

Mario Morales Coliseum, Guaynabo

December 7, 2007

Boxscore

Soles de Mexicali (Mexico)	79–70	(United States) PBL All-Stars
Scoring by quarter: 27–27, 19–10, 11–19, 22–14
Pts: Penny 19; Rebs: Carrillo García 10; Asts: Wheat, Esquer Paredes 3		Pts: Pérez Tejeda 20; Rebs: Pittman 8 Asts: Howard, Russell 2

Mario Morales Coliseum, Guaynabo

December 7, 2007

Boxscore

Cangrejeros de Santurce (Puerto Rico)	91–62	(Dominican Republic) Metros de Santiago
Scoring by quarter: 24–18, 26–13, 22–20, 19–11
Pts: Dalmau, Watson 22; Rebs: Traylor 10; Asts: Dalmau 5		Pts: Solano 17; Rebs: Solano 9 Asts: Lenderborg 6

Mario Morales Coliseum, Guaynabo

=== Group B (Miami) ===
Pos	Team	Pld	W	L	PF	PA	PD
1.	(United States) Miami Tropics	3	3	0	296	264	+32
2.	(Mexico) Halcones de Xalapa	3	1	2	310	287	+23
3.	(Mexico) Fuerza Regia	3	1	2	274	288	−14
4.	(Puerto Rico) Capitanes de Arecibo	3	1	2	253	290	−37

December 11, 2007

Boxscore

Capitanes de Arecibo (Puerto Rico)	96–93	(Mexico) Fuerza Regia
Scoring by quarter: 28–16, 26–22, 19–30, 23–25
Pts: Figueroa 22; Rebs: Figueroa 11; Asts: Hatton 9		Pts: Quintero, Williams, 23; Rebs: Crutchfield 11; Asts: Quintero 6

FIU Arena, Miami

December 11, 2007

Boxscore

Miami Tropics (United States)	112–105 (OT)	(Mexico) Halcones de Xalapa
Scoring by quarter: 20–29, 24–22, 26–20, 21–20, Overtime: 21–14
Pts: Rosario 32; Rebs: Shelman 13; Asts: Shelman 6		Pts: Mata 29; Rebs: Bradley, Ayón 10; Asts: Bowie, Prendes 4

FIU Arena, Miami

December 12, 2007

Boxscore

Capitanes de Arecibo (Puerto Rico)	86–116	(Mexico) Halcones de Xalapa
Scoring by quarter: 16–22, 20–35, 27–27, 23–32
Pts: Figueroa 21; Rebs: Massenburg 10; Asts: Cruz 5		Pts: Bowie 25; Rebs: Avila 8 Asts: Bradley 6

FIU Arena, Miami

December 12, 2007

Boxscore

Fuerza Regia (Mexico)	88–103	(United States) Miami Tropics
Scoring by quarter: 16–25, 26–19, 23–30, 23–29
Pts: Williams 28; Rebs: Jackson 17; Asts: Jackson, Quintero 3		Pts: Watson 25; Rebs: Shelman 9 Asts: Mitchell, Shelman, Watson 6

FIU Arena, Miami

December 13, 2007

Boxscore

Fuerza Regia (Mexico)	93–89	(Mexico) Halcones de Xalapa
Scoring by quarter: 23–26, 18–17, 27–26, 25–20
Pts: Williams 35; Rebs: Crutchfield, Jackson 9 Asts: Crutchfield 3		Pts: Salcido 17; Rebs: Bowie 6 Asts: Bowie 5

FIU Arena, Miami

December 13, 2007

Boxscore

Capitanes de Arecibo (Puerto Rico)	71–81	(United States) Miami Tropics
Scoring by quarter: 17–11, 13–29, 22–18, 19–23
Pts: Figueroa 25; Rebs: Massenburg 9 Asts: Cruz 9		Pts: Watson 24; Rebs: Baldonado 9 Asts: Shelman 5

FIU Arena, Miami

=== Group C (Belo Horizonte) ===
Pos	Team	Pld	W	L	PF	PA	PD	Tie
1.	(Brazil) Minas Tênis Clube	3	2	1	241	232	+9	1–0
2.	(Uruguay) Defensor Sporting	3	2	1	242	225	+17	0–1
3.	(Argentina) Boca Juniors	3	1	2	215	246	−31	1–0
4.	(Brazil) Flamengo	3	1	2	250	245	+5	0–1

December 18, 2007

Boxscore

Boca Juniors (Argentina)	73–94	(Uruguay) Defensor Sporting
Scoring by quarter: 16–17, 18–23, 15–26, 24–28
Pts: Gutiérrez 19; Rebs: Alloatti, Gutiérrez, Stephens 6 Asts: Sartorelli 3		Pts: Jackson 34; Rebs: Mielke 14; Asts: González 5

Juscelino Kubitschek Arena, Belo Horizonte

December 18, 2007

Boxscore

Minas Tênis Clube (Brazil)	88–99	(Brazil) Flamengo
Scoring by quarter: 18–22, 20–26, 24–10, 26–41
Pts: Johnson 26; Rebs: Camargos 9 Asts: Sucatzky 11		Pts: Da Costa, Machado 25; Rebs: Coloneze 13; Asts: Lima 8

Juscelino Kubitschek Arena, Belo Horizonte

December 19, 2007

Boxscore

Boca Juniors (Argentina)	77–76	(Brazil) Flamengo
Scoring by quarter: 24–22, 16–15, 22–16, 15–23
Pts: Orona 20; Rebs: Cequeira, Stephens 6 Asts: Sartorelli 5		Pts: Machado 23; Rebs: Machado 8 Asts: Vega 4

Juscelino Kubitschek Arena, Belo Horizonte

December 19, 2007

Boxscore

(Brazil) Minas Tênis Clube	77–68	Defensor Sporting (Uruguay)
Scoring by quarter: 23–15, 17–17, 23–17, 13–19
Pts: Machado 28; Rebs: Machado 14; Asts: Sucatzky 9		Pts: Jackson, Castrillon 18; Rebs: Mielke 16; Asts: González Correa 8

Juscelino Kubitschek Arena, Belo Horizonte

December 20, 2007

Boxscore

(Brazil) Flamengo	75–80	Defensor Sporting (Uruguay)
Scoring by quarter: 17–24, 21–16, 16–17, 21–23
Pts: Da Costa 26; Rebs: Coloneze 13; Asts: Alvim, Lima 3		Pts: Jackson 26; Rebs: Paez 10; Asts: González Correa 6

Juscelino Kubitschek Arena, Belo Horizonte

December 20, 2007

Boxscore

(Argentina) Boca Juniors	65–76	Minas Tênis Clube (Brazil)
Scoring by quarter: 19–22, 9–26, 18–18, 19–20
Pts: Cequeira 19; Rebs: Robinson 9 Asts: Cequeira 3		Pts: Johnson 21; Rebs: Machado 9 Asts: Sucatzky 10

Juscelino Kubitschek Arena, Belo Horizonte

=== Group D (Mar del Plata) ===
Pos	Team	Pld	W	L	PF	PA	PD
1.	(Argentina) Peñarol	3	3	0	248	207	+41
2.	(Argentina) Libertad	3	2	1	228	204	+24
3.	(Brazil) Brasília	3	1	2	218	238	−20
4.	(Chile) Liceo Mixto	3	0	3	224	269	−45

January 8, 2008

Boxscore

Libertad (Argentina)	76–65	(Brazil) Brasília
Scoring by quarter: 20–12, 20–16, 21–20, 15–17
Pts: Battle 19; Rebs: Battle, Ceruti 7 Asts: Pelussi 4		Pts: Ferreira 15; Rebs: Ferreira 8 Asts: Silva 9

Polideportivo Islas Malvinas, Mar del Plata

January 8, 2008

Boxscore

Peñarol (Argentina)	95–76	(Chile) Liceo Mixto
Scoring by quarter: 25–21, 17–17, 27–15, 26–23
Pts: González 21; Rebs: Osborne 10; Asts: Rodríguez 7		Pts: Hill 22; Rebs: Briones, Madison 8 Asts: Saez 6

Polideportivo Islas Malvinas, Mar del Plata

January 9, 2008

Boxscore

Brasília (Brazil)	86–78	(Chile) Liceo Mixto
Scoring by quarter: 15–19, 34–18, 27–21, 10–20
Pts: Belchor 30; Rebs: De Souza 7 Asts: Santos, Spillers, Silva, Fonseca 3		Pts: Briones, Werth 14; Rebs: Madison 8 Asts: Madison 3

Polideportivo Islas Malvinas, Mar del Plata

January 9, 2008

Boxscore

Peñarol (Argentina)	69–64	(Argentina) Libertad
Scoring by quarter: 21–18, 18–10, 13–15, 17–21
Pts: Wadley 22; Rebs: González 7 Asts: Picarelli 6		Pts: Battle, Ginóbili 16; Rebs: Battle, Pelussi 8 Asts: Ceruti, Ginóbili 4

Polideportivo Islas Malvinas, Mar del Plata

January 10, 2008

Boxscore

Libertad (Argentina)	88–70	(Chile) Liceo Mixto
Scoring by quarter: 24–21, 22–16, 26–20, 16–13
Pts: Battle 22; Rebs: Pelussi 7 Asts: Ginóbili 6		Pts: Madison 17; Rebs: Madison 8 Asts: Werth 6

Polideportivo Islas Malvinas, Mar del Plata

January 10, 2008

Boxscore

Peñarol (Argentina)	84–67	(Brazil) Brasília
Scoring by quarter: 20–12, 21–12, 14–24, 29–19
Pts: Wadley 22; Rebs: Osborne 7 Asts: Rodríguez 6		Pts: Spillers 22; Rebs: Santos Cipriano 8 Asts: Silva 3

Polideportivo Islas Malvinas, Mar del Plata

== Quarterfinals ==
	Team No. 1	Agg.	Team No. 2	Game 1	Game 2	Game 3
1.	Halcones de Xalapa (Mexico)	1–2	(Mexico) Soles de Mexicali	93–78	60–72	84–67
2.	Libertad (Argentina)	0–2	(Brazil) Minas Tênis Clube	72–74	73–80	
3.	Cangrejeros de Santurce (Puerto Rico)	1–2	(United States) Miami Tropics	102–94	64–91	83–91
4.	Defensor Sporting (Uruguay)	1–2	(Argentina) Peñarol	98–95	74-98	68–77

=== Game 1 ===
January 14, 2008

Boxscore

Halcones de Xalapa (Mexico)	93–78	(Mexico) Soles de Mexicali
Scoring by quarter: 25–14, 29–30, 24–13, 15–21
Pts: Ayón 20; Rebs: Selleaze 8 Asts: Johnson 7		Pts: Lewis 23; Rebs: Lewis 12; Asts: Chávez, Penny, Wheat 3

Gimnasio USBI, Xalapa

January 15, 2008

Boxscore

Libertad (Argentina)	72–74	(Brazil) Minas Tênis Clube
Scoring by quarter: 18–26, 18–14, 22–17, 14–17
Pts: Pelussi 19; Rebs: Battle 11; Asts: Müller, Ginóbili, Pelussi 4		Pts: Campos 15; Rebs: Johnson 7 Asts: Sucatzky 6

Hogar de los Tigres, Sunchales

January 16, 2008

Boxscore

Cangrejeros de Santurce (Puerto Rico)	102–94	(United States) Miami Tropics
Scoring by quarter: 26–17, 17–26, 28–19, 31–32
Pts: Dalmau 29; Rebs: Traylor 10; Asts: Santiago 9		Pts: Barnes 19; Rebs: Robinson 7 Asts: Mitchell 5

Mario Morales Coliseum, Guaynabo

January 17, 2008

Boxscore

Defensor Sporting (Uruguay)	98–95	(Argentina) Peñarol
Scoring by quarter: 25–23, 30–24, 23–27, 20–21
Pts: Jackson 29; Rebs: Mielke 9 Asts: Jackson 7		Pts: Wadley 32; Rebs: Osborne 7 Asts: Osborne 6

Estadio Alberto Casal, Montevideo

=== Game 2 ===
January 21, 2008

Boxscore

Soles de Mexicali (Mexico)	72–60	(Mexico) Halcones de Xalapa
Scoring by quarter: 26–26, 8–10, 25–11, 13–13
Pts: Llamas 19; Rebs: Llamas 7 Asts: Wheat 4		Pts: Bowie 12; Rebs: Ayón 9 Asts: Johnson 4

Auditorio del Estado, Mexicali

January 22, 2008

Boxscore

Minas Tênis Clube (Brazil)	80–73	(Argentina) Libertad
Scoring by quarter: 27–18, 19–13, 11–17, 23–25
Pts: Sucatzky 25; Rebs: Camargos, Sucatzky 5 Asts: Sucatzky 10		Pts: Pelussi 21; Rebs: Battle 10; Asts: Moldu 4

Juscelino Kubitschek Arena, Belo Horizonte

January 24, 2008

Boxscore

Miami Tropics (United States)	91–64	(Puerto Rico) Cangrejeros de Santurce
Scoring by quarter: 17–18, 19–13, 30–18, 25–15
Pts: Barnes 23; Rebs: Rosario 12; Asts: Mitchell 7		Pts: Traylor 14; Rebs: Traylor 9 Asts: Santiago 3

FIU Stadium, Miami

January 22, 2008

Boxscore

Peñarol (Argentina)	98–74	(Uruguay) Defensor Sporting
Scoring by quarter: 20–24, 24–16, 26–16, 28–18
Pts: Wadley 19; Rebs: Osborne 9 Asts: Wadley 7		Pts: Jackson 19; Rebs: Manciel 7 Asts: González Correa 8

Polideportivo Islas Malvinas, Mar del Plata

=== Game 3 ===
January 22, 2008

Boxscore

Soles de Mexicali (Mexico)	84–67	(Mexico) Halcones de Xalapa
Scoring by quarter: 16–20, 19–19, 21–9, 28–19
Pts: Lewis, Wheat 20; Rebs: Llamas 12; Asts: Lewis, Lopez, Penny, Wheat 3		Pts: Johnson 23; Rebs: Ayón 10; Asts: Johnson 4

Auditorio del Estado, Mexicali

January 25, 2008

Boxscore

Miami Tropics (United States)	91–83	(Puerto Rico) Cangrejeros de Santurce
Scoring by quarter: 16–16, 28–24, 19–18, 28–25
Pts: Shelman 29; Rebs: Robinson 7 Asts: Shelman 4		Pts: Traylor 27; Rebs: Traylor 16; Asts: Dalmau, Santiago, Traylor, Watson 3

FIU Stadium, Miami

January 23, 2008

Boxscore

Peñarol (Argentina)	77–68	(Uruguay) Defensor Sporting
Scoring by quarter: 21–20, 21–16, 16–12, 19–20
Pts: Rodríguez 17; Rebs: Locatelli 10; Asts: Rodríguez 6		Pts: Jackson 21; Rebs: Paez 14; Asts: Castrillón 4

Polideportivo Islas Malvinas, Mar del Plata

== Final 4 ==
Peñarol got the first place in the round-robin group and won their first Americas League title due to a better point difference than the other two teams who had the same record (Soles de Mexicali and Miami Tropics).

Pos	Team	Pld	W	L	PF	PA	PD	Tie
1.	(Argentina) Peñarol	3	2	1	270	246	+24	1–1 (+24)
2.	(Mexico) Soles de Mexicali	3	2	1	287	278	+9	1–1 (+9)
3.	(United States) Miami Tropics	3	2	1	260	267	−7	1–1 (–7)
4.	(Brazil) Minas Tênis Clube	3	0	3	236	280	−44	

February 7, 2008

Boxscore

Peñarol (Argentina)	94–77	(United States) Miami Tropics
Scoring by quarter: 25–17, 22–20, 25–18, 22–22
Pts: Wadley 32; Rebs: Osborne 11; Asts: Wadley 4		Pts: Shelman 16; Rebs: Rosario 8 Asts: Watson 5

Auditorio del Estado, Mexicali

February 7, 2008

Boxscore

Soles de Mexicali (Mexico)	95–83	(Brazil) Minas Tênis Clube
Scoring by quarter: 22–26, 31–16, 14–24, 28–17
Pts: Lewis 27; Rebs: Lewis 16; Asts: López 6		Pts: Johnson 23; Rebs: Machado 8 Asts: Sucatzky 8

Auditorio del Estado, Mexicali

February 8, 2008

Boxscore

Peñarol (Argentina)	97–85	(Brazil) Minas Tênis Clube
Scoring by quarter: 27–19, 27–19, 16–20, 27–27
Pts: Wadley 26; Rebs: Locatelli 7 Asts: Locatelli, Rodríguez, Wasdley 5		Pts: Johnson 23; Rebs: Johnson 11; Asts: Sucatzky 14

Auditorio del Estado, Mexicali

February 8, 2008

Boxscore

Soles de Mexicali (Mexico)	108–116 (OT)	(United States) Miami Tropics
Scoring by quarter: 24–28, 38–25, 20–24, 18–23, Overtime: 8–16
Pts: Llamas 26; Rebs: Llamas 13; Asts: Wheat 10		Pts: Barnes 29; Rebs: Watson 11; Asts: Mitchell 7

Auditorio del Estado, Mexicali

February 9, 2008

Boxscore

Minas Tênis Clube (Brazil)	65–67	(United States) Miami Tropics
Scoring by quarter: 19–18, 13–20, 24–8, 9–21
Pts: Fernandes 21; Rebs: Johnson, Santos 8 Asts: Sucatzky 9		Pts: Watson 15; Rebs: Rosario 11; Asts: Mitchell 3

Auditorio del Estado, Mexicali

February 9, 2008

Boxscore

Soles de Mexicali (Mexico)	84–79	(Argentina) Peñarol
Scoring by quarter: 25–18, 16–27, 27–23, 16–11
Pts: Lewis 22; Rebs: Lewis 12; Asts: Penny, Wheat, López, Lewis 3		Pts: Wadley 28; Rebs: Osborne 9 Asts: Rodríguez 3

Auditorio del Estado, Mexicali

FIBA Americas League 2007–08 Champions

Peñarol de Mar del Plata
1st title
