= Lula Ferreira =

Brazilian basketball coach

Personal information
- Born: January 2, 1951 (age 75) São Paulo, Brazil
- Position: Head coach

Career history

Coaching
- 2001–2005: COC/Ribeirão Preto
- 2003–2007: Brazil
- 2007–2010: Universo BRB
- 2012–2016: Franca

Career highlights
- As a head coach: FIBA Americas League champion (2009); Brazilian champion (2003); 2× Brazilian League Coach of the Year (2010, 2013); 5× São Paulo State champion (2001–2005)

Aluísio ("Lula") Elias Ferreira Xavier, commonly known as Lula Ferreira (born January 2, 1951, in São Paulo), is a Brazilian professional basketball coach.

== Coaching career ==
=== Clubs ===
During his professional club head coaching career, Ferreira coached several clubs in Brazil's top-level league, the New Basket Brazil (NBB), including clubs like Universo BRB and Franca. As a head coach, he won the Brazilian Championship in 2003, and the São Paulo State Championship five times, in 2001, 2002, 2003, 2004, and 2005. He also won the FIBA Americas League championship in 2009. He was the Brazilian League Coach of the Year in 2010 and 2013.

=== National teams ===
As the head coach of the senior Brazilian national basketball team, Ferreira led Brazil to gold medals at the following tournaments: the 2003 FIBA South American Championship, the 2003 Pan American Games, the 2005 FIBA AmeriCup, the 2006 FIBA South American Championship, and the 2007 Pan American Games. He also won a silver medal at the 2004 FIBA South American Championship.

Ferreira was also the head coach of Brazil at the 2006 FIBA World Championship, in Japan. Brazil finished that tournament in 17th place.
