= 2010–11 FIBA Americas League =

FIBA Americas League 2010–11
- League: FIBA Americas League
- Sport: Basketball
- Duration: December 9, 2010 – March 6, 2011
- Top scorer: (Panama) Jaime Lloreda (Halcones Rojos)

Finals
- Champions: (Argentina) Regatas Corrientes
- Runners-up: (Puerto Rico) Capitanes de Arecibo
- Grand Final MVP: (Argentina) Federico Kammerichs (Regatas Corrientes)

FIBA Americas League seasons
- ← 2009–10 2012 →

The 2010–11 FIBA Americas League was the fourth edition of the first-tier and most important professional international club basketball competition in the regions of South America, Central America, the Caribbean, and Mexico, with the winner of the competition being crowned as the best team and champion of all of those regions. It was played between December 9, 2010 and March 6, 2011. The Argentine League club Peñarol de Mar del Plata, was the defending champion. Regatas Corrientes, also from Argentina, won the title.

== Group stage ==
=== Group A ===
Team	W	L	Pts	PF	PA
(Argentina) Regatas Corrientes	3	0	6	249	218
(Argentina) Peñarol de Mar del Plata	2	1	5	254	228
(Mexico) Toros de Nuevo Laredo	1	2	4	227	228
(Venezuela) Espartanos de Margarita	0	3	3	217	273

=== Group B ===
Team	W	L	Pts	PF	PA
(Mexico) Halcones UV Xalapa	3	0	6	295	244
(Brazil) Brasília	2	1	5	280	258
(Uruguay) Defensor Sporting	1	2	4	227	252
(Dominican Republic) Cañeros de la Romana	0	3	3	253	301

=== Group C ===
Team	W	L	Pts	PF	PA
(Brazil) Flamengo	3	0	6	244	218
(Argentina) Quimsa	2	1	5	228	205
(Chile) Español de Talca	1	2	4	213	242
(Ecuador) Mavort	0	3	3	221	241

=== Group D ===
Team	W	L	Pts	PF	PA
(Puerto Rico) Capitanes de Arecibo	2	1	5	243	233
(Mexico) Halcones Rojos	2	1	5	256	251
(Venezuela) Cocodrilos de Caracas	1	2	4	228	235
(Argentina) Juventud Sionista	1	2	4	229	237

== Quarterfinals stage ==
=== Group E ===
Team	W	L	Pts	PF	PA
(Mexico) Halcones Rojos	3	0	6	245	229
(Puerto Rico) Capitanes de Arecibo	2	1	5	256	252
(Argentina) Peñarol de Mar del Plata	1	2	4	238	238
(Brazil) Flamengo	0	3	3	238	258

=== Group F ===
Team	W	L	Pts	PF	PA
(Mexico) Halcones UV Xalapa	2	1	5	248	209
(Argentina) Regatas Corrientes	2	1	5	223	250
(Argentina) Quimsa	1	2	4	203	205
(Brazil) Brasília	1	2	4	233	243

== Final 4 ==
Team	W	L	Pts	PF	PA
(Argentina) Regatas Corrientes	2	1	5	240	219
(Puerto Rico) Capitanes de Arecibo	2	1	5	218	224
(Mexico) Halcones UV Xalapa	1	2	4	226	237
(Mexico) Halcones Rojos	1	2	4	223	227

=== Game 1 ===
March 4
18:00

Report

Halcones Rojos (Mexico)	68–70	(Puerto Rico) Capitanes de Arecibo
Scoring by quarter: 20–15, 17–16, 18–20, 13–19
Pts: Ferrón 23; Rebs: Ferrón 11; Asts: Ruiz 7		Pts: Pinnock 20; Rebs: Pinnock 9 Asts: Pinnock 5

Gimnasio de Halcones, Xalapa, Mexico

March 4
20:10

Report

Halcones UV Xalapa (Mexico)	72–81	(Argentina) Regatas Corrientes
Scoring by quarter: 13–13, 9–11, 22–29, 28–28
Pts: Roe 23; Rebs: Roe 8 Asts: Morales 4		Pts: Kammerichs 18; Rebs: Kammerichs 19; Asts: Miranda 9

Gimnasio de Halcones, Xalapa, Mexico

=== Game 2 ===
March 5
18:00

Report

Regatas Corrientes (Argentina)	70–74	(Mexico) Halcones Rojos
Scoring by quarter: 14–12, 23–22, 20–18, 13–22
Pts: Kammerichs, Stanton 16; Rebs: Benson 13; Asts: Miranda 6		Pts: Ferrón 22; Rebs: Robinson 9 Asts: Stoll, Ruiz 4

Gimnasio de Halcones, Xalapa, Mexico

March 5
20:10

Report

Capitanes de Arecibo (Puerto Rico)	75–67	(Mexico) Halcones UV Xalapa
Scoring by quarter: 22–21, 16–12, 23–20, 14–14
Pts: Ayuso 24; Rebs: Pinnock 10; Asts: Pinnock 4		Pts: Reyes 19; Rebs: Roe 12; Asts: Hernandez 9

Gimnasio de Halcones, Xalapa, Mexico

=== Game 3 ===
March 6
18:00

Report

Regatas Corrientes (Argentina)	89–73	(Puerto Rico) Capitanes de Arecibo
Scoring by quarter: 20–12, 25–21, 25–19, 19–21
Pts: Kammerichs 23; Rebs: Romano 6 Asts: Martinez Miranda 14		Pts: Pinnock 19; Rebs: Aubry Torress 5 Asts: Hatton 5

Gimnasio de Halcones, Xalapa, Mexico

March 6
20:10

Report

Halcones UV Xalapa (Mexico)	87–81	(Mexico) Halcones Rojos
Scoring by quarter: 26–22, 27–19, 14–19, 20–21
Pts: Roe 17; Rebs: Roe 9 Asts: Meza Rogel 6		Pts: Ferrón 27; Rebs: Ferrón 7 Asts: Stoll 3

Gimnasio de Halcones, Xalapa, Mexico
