= 2008–09 FIBA Americas League =

FIBA Americas League 2008–09
- League: FIBA Americas League
- Sport: Basketball
- Duration: December 9, 2008 – February 8, 2009
- Top scorer: (Uruguay) Leandro García Morales (Biguá)

Finals
- Champions: (Brazil) Brasília
- Runners-up: (Mexico) Halcones de Xalapa
- Grand Final MVP: (Brazil) Alex Garcia (Brasília)

FIBA Americas League seasons
- ← 2007–08 2009–10 →

The 2008–09 FIBA Americas League was the second edition of the first-tier and most important professional international club basketball competition in the regions of South America, Central America, the Caribbean, and Mexico, with the winner of the competition being crowned as the best team and champion of all of those regions. It began on December 4. The first stage was a round robin phase, with four teams in each group. Each of the groups were played in different cities, (Arecibo, Mar del Plata, Sunchales, and Xalapa). The first team from each group advanced to the Final 4 round-robin stage that took place in the city of Xalapa, Mexico.

== Teams allocation ==
Group phase
(Argentina) Regatas de Corrientes^{LSH}(LNB)	(Brazil) Brasília (2nd)	(Mexico) Soles de Mexicali (2nd)	Liceo de Costa Rica (1st)
(Argentina) Peñarol Mar del Plata (3d)	(Brazil) Flamengo (2nd)	(Mexico) Halcones de Xalapa (1st)	(Dominican Republic) Merengueros (WC)
(Argentina) Libertad Sunchales(1st)	(Brazil) Minas Tênis (3d)	(Uruguay) Biguá (1st)	(Mexico) Pioneros de Quintana Roo (WC)
(Argentina) Quimsa (2nd)	(Chile) Universidad de Concepción (4th)	(Chile) Deportes Castro (3d)	(Puerto Rico) Capitanes de Arecibo (1st)

The labels in the brackets show how each team qualified for the place of its starting round (TH: Americas League title holders, LSH: Liga Sudamerican title holders):

- LC: Qualified through a licensed club with a long-term licence
- 1st, 2nd, etc.: League position after Playoffs

== Group stage ==
Key to colors
Top two places advanced to the Final 4

=== Group A (Arecibo) ===
Minas Tênis Clube advanced due to a better goal average.

Pos	Team	Pld	W	L	PF	PA	PD	Tie
1.	(Brazil) Minas Tênis Clube	3	2	1	264	234	+30	1–1 (1.128)
2.	(Puerto Rico) Capitanes de Arecibo	3	2	1	286	243	+43	1–1 (1.177)
3.	(Dominican Republic) Merengueros	3	2	1	248	261	−13	1–1 (.950)
4.	(Mexico) Pioneros de Quintana Roo	3	0	3	230	290	−60	

December 9, 2008

Boxscore

Merengueros (Dominican Republic)	65–90	(Brazil) Minas Tênis Clube
Scoring by quarter: 24–26, 16–27, 16–25, 9–12
Pts: Tavares 14; Rebs: Paniagua, Tavares 5 Asts: Coronado, Mata 2		Pts: Becker 22; Rebs: Da Cruz Silva 9 Asts: Sucatzky 15

Coliseo Manuel Iguina, Arecibo

December 9, 2008

Boxscore

Capitanes de Arecibo (Puerto Rico)	104–72	(Mexico) Pioneros de Quintana Roo
Scoring by quarter: 25–12, 21–22, 26–27, 32–21
Pts: Figueroa 20; Rebs: Figueroa 8 Asts: Cruz 7		Pts: Wade 22; Rebs: Braggs 10; Asts: Fleming 3

Coliseo Manuel Iguina, Arecibo

December 10, 2008

Boxscore

Minas Tênis Clube (Brazil)	93–74	(Mexico) Pioneros de Quintana Roo
Scoring by quarter: 31–14, 14–21, 28–18, 20–21
Pts: Shipp 21; Rebs: Becker 8 Asts: Sucatzky 12		Pts: Braggs 18; Rebs: Braggs 5 Asts: Braggs 4

Coliseo Manuel Iguina, Arecibo

December 10, 2008

Boxscore

Merengueros (Dominican Republic)	90–87 (OT)	(Puerto Rico) Capitanes de Arecibo
Scoring by quarter: 18–15, 12–20, 21–21, 26–21, Overtime: 13–10
Pts: Martínez 18; Rebs: Paniagua 17; Asts: Sandoval 5		Pts: Wilson 22; Rebs: Aubry 14; Asts: Cruz 5

Coliseo Manuel Iguina, Arecibo

December 11, 2008

Boxscore

Pioneros de Quintana Roo (Mexico)	84–93	(Dominican Republic) Merengueros
Scoring by quarter: 20–27, 13–14, 22–25, 29–27
Pts: Fleming 30; Rebs: Braggs 15; Asts: Braggs 5		Pts: Sandoval 25; Rebs: Paniagua 7 Asts: Sandoval 7

Coliseo Manuel Iguina, Arecibo

December 11, 2008

Boxscore

Capitanes de Arecibo (Puerto Rico)	95–81	(Brazil) Minas Tênis Clube
Scoring by quarter: 22–19, 27–24, 24–21, 22–17
Pts: Figueroa 26; Rebs: Aubry, Figueroa 9 Asts: Rodríguez 3		Pts: Shipp 23; Rebs: Becker, Goncalves de Oliveira 5 Asts: Sucatzky 8

Coliseo Manuel Iguina, Arecibo

=== Group B (Mar del Plata) ===
Pos	Team	Pld	W	L	PF	PA	PD	Tie
1.	(Uruguay) Biguá	3	3	0	231	199	+32	
2.	(Argentina) Peñarol	3	1	2	224	218	+6	1–1 (1.033)
3.	(Argentina) Regatas de Corrientes	3	1	2	233	234	−1	1–1 (.996)
4.	(Chile) Universidad de Concepción	3	1	2	213	250	−37	1–1 (.852)

December 16, 2008

Boxscore

Biguá (Uruguay)	71–68	(Argentina) Regatas de Corrientes
Scoring by quarter: 16–19, 15–21, 14–11, 26–17
Pts: García Morales 22; Rebs: Wolkowyski 11; Asts: M. Osimani 4		Pts: Acosta 18; Rebs: Stanton 8 Asts: Montecchia, Stanton 3

Polideportivo Islas Malvinas, Mar del Plata

December 16, 2008

Boxscore

Peñarol (Argentina)	80–63	(Chile) Universidad de Concepción
Scoring by quarter: 17–17, 24–9, 21–22, 18–15
Pts: Jackson 16; Rebs: Johnson 10; Asts: Rodríguez 7		Pts: Hardwick, Maxey 17; Rebs: Hardwick 10; Asts: Hernández 4

Polideportivo Islas Malvinas, Mar del Plata

December 17, 2008

Boxscore

Biguá (Uruguay)	76–54	(Chile) Universidad de Concepción
Scoring by quarter: 19–11, 24–7, 14–17, 19–19
Pts: J. Osimani 11; Rebs: Young 7 Asts: Rovira 3		Pts: Agba 20; Rebs: Agba 13; Asts: Hernández 5

Polideportivo Islas Malvinas, Mar del Plata

December 17, 2008

Boxscore

Regatas de Corrientes (Argentina)	71–67	(Argentina) Peñarol
Scoring by quarter: 21–18, 12–8, 13–26, 25–15
Pts: Tintorelli 21; Rebs: Tintorelli 10; Asts: Cequeira 2		Pts: Rodríguez 16; Rebs: González 11; Asts: Malara 5

Polideportivo Islas Malvinas, Mar del Plata

December 18, 2008

Boxscore

Universidad de Concepción (Chile)	96–94 (OT)	(Argentina) Regatas de Corrientes
Scoring by quarter: 18–21, 19–21, 21–16, 20–20, Overtime: 11–11, 7–5
Pts: Maxey 26; Rebs: Hardwick 15; Asts: Hernández 6		Pts: Tintorelli 21; Rebs: López 13; Asts: López, Montecchia 4

Polideportivo Islas Malvinas, Mar del Plata

December 18, 2008

Boxscore

Peñarol (Argentina)	77–84 (OT)	(Uruguay) Biguá
Scoring by quarter: 16–21, 9–16, 17–12, 24–17, Overtime: 11–18
Pts: Jackson, Johnson 18; Rebs: Johnson 13; Asts: Jackson, Muruaga, Picarelli 2		Pts: García Morales 35; Rebs: Wolkowyski 11; Asts: M. Osimani 3

Polideportivo Islas Malvinas, Mar del Plata

=== Group C (Sunchales) ===
Pos	Team	Pld	W	L	PF	PA	PD
1.	(Brazil) Brasília	3	2	1	268	251	+17
2.	(Brazil) Flamengo	3	2	1	297	262	+35
3.	(Argentina) Libertad de Sunchales	3	2	1	277	261	+16
4.	(Chile) Deportes Castro	3	0	3	250	318	−68

January 14, 2008

Boxscore

Libertad de Sunchales (Argentina)	114–88	(Chile) Deportes Castro
Scoring by quarter: 32–22, 27–19, 25–27, 30–20
Pts: Farley 33; Rebs: Zilli 6 Asts: 5 Players 3		Pts: Smith 32; Rebs: Smith 9 Asts: McFadgon 4

Hogar de los Tigres, Sunchales

January 14, 2008

Boxscore

Brasília (Brazil)	92–96	(Brazil) Flamengo
Scoring by quarter: 17–19, 16–23, 32–29, 27–25
Pts: Garcia 21; Rebs: Ferreira 9 Asts: Fonseca, Garcia 3		Pts: M. Machado 23; Rebs: Araújo, E. Machado 5 Asts: E. Machado, M. Machado 4

Hogar de los Tigres, Sunchales

January 15, 2008

Boxscore

Flamengo (Brazil)	117–77	(Chile) Deportes Castro
Scoring by quarter: 28–18, 26–15, 30–20, 33–24
Pts: M. Machado 26; Rebs: Araújo, Andrade da Silva 8 Asts: M. Machado 5		Pts: McFagdon 17; Rebs: Smith 7 Asts: Smith 4

Hogar de los Tigres, Sunchales

January 15, 2008

Boxscore

Brasília (Brazil)	89–70	(Argentina) Libertad de Sunchales
Scoring by quarter: 22–19, 29–11, 16–20, 22–20
Pts: Garcia 21; Rebs: Santos 10; Asts: da Silva 4		Pts: Alston 14; Rebs: Farley 5 Asts: Ginóbili 3

Hogar de los Tigres, Sunchales

January 16, 2008

Boxscore

Deportes Castro (Chile)	85–87	(Brazil) Brasília
Scoring by quarter: 21–22, 17–15, 27–26, 20–24
Pts: Posey 23; Rebs: Campos, Posey 6 Asts: Campos 4		Pts: Garcia 30; Rebs: Ferreira, Rodrigues 7 Asts: Garcia 4

Hogar de los Tigres, Sunchales

January 16, 2008

Boxscore

Libertad de Sunchales (Argentina)	93–84	(Brazil) Flamengo
Scoring by quarter: 24–18, 23–15, 29–21, 17–30
Pts: Farley 25; Rebs: Alston 8 Asts: Moldú 7		Pts: M. Machado 23; Rebs: Araújo 9 Asts: E. Machado 2

Hogar de los Tigres, Sunchales

=== Group D (Xalapa) ===
Pos	Team	Pld	W	L	PF	PA	PD
1.	(Mexico) Halcones de Xalapa	3	3	0	305	220	+85
2.	(Mexico) Soles de Mexicali	3	2	1	265	255	+10
3.	(Argentina) Quimsa	3	1	2	238	275	−37
4.	Liceo de Costa Rica	3	0	3	254	312	−58

January 20, 2009

Boxscore

Quimsa (Argentina)	73–87	(Mexico) Soles de Mexicali
Scoring by quarter: 24–25, 16–21, 19–20, 14–21
Pts: Mikulas 19; Rebs: Mikulas 8 Asts: Treise 7		Pts: Pedroza 18; Rebs: Lewis, Llamas, López 5 Asts: Wheat 6

Gimnasio USBI, Xalapa

January 20, 2009

Boxscore

Halcones de Xalapa (Mexico)	116–73	Liceo de Costa Rica
Scoring by quarter: 30–19, 23–25, 33–15, 30–14
Pts: Hickerson 21; Rebs: Hickerson 9 Asts: Hickerson 8		Pts: Jennings 26; Rebs: Julio, Leith 7 Asts: Jones 5

Gimnasio USBI, Xalapa

January 21, 2009

Boxscore

Soles de Mexicali (Mexico)	100–96	Liceo de Costa Rica
Scoring by quarter: 22–22, 31–17, 26–24, 21–33
Pts: Lewis 27; Rebs: Llamas 8 Asts: Paredes, Herrera 4		Pts: Martinez 22; Rebs: Leith 8 Asts: Chavarria 8

Gimnasio USBI, Xalapa

January 21, 2009

Boxscore

Quimsa (Argentina)	69–103	(Mexico) Halcones de Xalapa
Scoring by quarter: 22–20, 14–27, 19–30, 14–26
Pts: Mikulas 17; Rebs: Treise 6 Asts: Mason, Treise 4		Pts: Truitt 24; Rebs: Ayón, Truitt 7 Asts: Mills 8

Gimnasio USBI, Xalapa

January 22, 2009

Boxscore

Liceo de Costa Rica	85–96	(Argentina) Quimsa
Scoring by quarter: 18–24, 23–22, 10–25, 34–25
Pts: Leith 21; Rebs: Leith 11; Asts: Chavarria 6		Pts: Mázzaro, Mikulas 25; Rebs: Mikulas 8 Asts: Camargos, Mázzaro 4

Gimnasio USBI, Xalapa

January 22, 2009

Boxscore

Halcones de Xalapa (Mexico)	86–78	(Mexico) Soles de Mexicali
Scoring by quarter: 16–17, 23–15, 20–24, 27–22
Pts: Ayón 27; Rebs: Ayón, Hickerson, Truitt 7 Asts: Hickerson, Mills 5		Pts: Pedroza 25; Rebs: Llamas 8 Asts: Marentez 3

Gimnasio USBI, Xalapa

== Final 4 ==
Team	W	L	Pts	PF	PA
(Brazil) Brasília	3	0	6	262	238
(Mexico) Halcones de Xalapa	2	1	5	287	261
(Uruguay) Club Biguá	1	2	4	250	263
(Brazil) Minas Tênis Clube	0	3	3	241	278

=== Round 1 ===
February 6
18:00

(Report)

Brasília (Brazil)	90–80	(Brazil) Minas Tênis Clube
Scoring by quarter: 20-12, 15-21, 26-29, 29-18
Pts: Valtinho 22; Asts: Marcio Cipriano 5		Pts: Joseph Shipp 18; Asts: Facundo Sucatzky 8

Gimnasio de Halcones, Xalapa, Mexico

February 6
20:15

(Report)

Halcones de Xalapa (Mexico)	100–91	(Uruguay) Club Biguá
Scoring by quarter: 21-18, 15-20, 31-27, 33-36
Pts: Samuel Bowie, Abdul Mills 21; Asts: Abdul Mills, Victor Mariscal 6		Pts: Leandro Garcia Morales 29; Asts: Martin Osimani 5

Gimnasio de Halcones, Xalapa, Mexico

=== Round 2 ===
February 7
18:00

(Report)

Club Biguá (Uruguay)	75–86	(Brazil) Brasília
Scoring by quarter: 17-22, 15-16, 24-20, 19-28
Pts: Leandro Garcia Morales 23; Asts: Martin Osimani 5		Pts: José Ferreira Jr. 19; Asts: Valtinho 10

Gimnasio de Halcones, Xalapa, Mexico

February 7
20:15

(Report)

Minas Tênis Clube (Brazil)	84–104	(Mexico) Halcones de Xalapa
Scoring by quarter: 30-22, 11-31, 25-29, 18-22
Pts: Evandro Fernandes 18; Asts: Facundo Sucatzky 11		Pts: Samuel Bowie 26; Asts: Abdul Mills 6

Gimnasio de Halcones, Xalapa, Mexico

=== Round 3 ===
February 8
16:00

(Report)

Minas Tênis Clube (Brazil)	77–84	(Uruguay) Club Biguá
Scoring by quarter: 16-14, 10-16, 28-26, 23-28
Pts: Joseph Shipp 24; Asts: Luiz Felipe Campos 7		Pts: Leandro Garcia Morales 29; Asts: Martin Osimani, Juan Rovira Ubal 4

Gimnasio de Halcones, Xalapa, Mexico

February 8
18:30

(Report)

Halcones de Xalapa (Mexico)	83–86	(Brazil) Brasília
Scoring by quarter: 29-19, 20-24, 18-27, 16-16
Pts: Abdul Mills 21; Asts: Abdul Mills 5		Pts: Valtinho 21; Asts: Alex Ribeiro Garcia 6

Gimnasio de Halcones, Xalapa, Mexico

FIBA Americas League 2008–09 Champions

Brasília
1st title

== Statistics ==
=== Top Scorer ===
- (Uruguay) Leandro Garcia Morales ( (Uruguay) Club Biguá )

=== Assists Leader ===
- (Argentina) Facundo Sucatzky ( (Brazil) Minas Tênis Clube )

== Awards ==
=== Grand Finals MVP ===
- (Brazil) Alex Ribeiro Garcia ( (Brazil) Brasília )
