= FIBA Americas League Awards =

FIBA Americas League Awards are the annual individual awards of the top-tier level men's professional club basketball league in Latin America, the FIBA Americas League (Portuguese: FIBA Liga das Américas, Spanish: FIBA Liga de las Américas).

== FIBA Americas League Grand Final MVP ==
The Grand Finals MVP is the award given to the best player of the Grand Final of the FIBA Americas League Final 4, which is the culminating final four tournament of each season's FIBA Americas League.

FIBA Americas League Grand Final MVP
Season	Grand Final MVP	Team
2008	(United States); Quincy Wadley	(Argentina); Peñarol de Mar del Plata
2009	(Brazil); Alex Garcia	(Brazil); Brasília
2010	(United States); Kyle LaMonte	(Argentina); Peñarol de Mar del Plata
2011	(Argentina); Federico Kammerichs	(Argentina); Regatas Corrientes
2012	(United States) – (Mexico); Chris Hernández	(Mexico); Pioneros de Quintana Roo
2013	(United States); Shamell	(Brazil); Pinheiros
2014	(Brazil); Marcelinho Machado	(Brazil); Flamengo
2015	(Brazil); Alex Garcia (2×)	(Brazil); Bauru
2016	(United States); Damien Wilkins	(Venezuela); Guaros de Lara
2017	(United States); Zach Graham	(Venezuela); Guaros de Lara
2018	(Argentina); Gabriel Deck	(Argentina); San Lorenzo de Almagro

== FIBA Americas League top scorer ==
The top scorer award is the award for the league leader in points per game of each season of FIBA Americas League.

FIBA Americas League top scorer
Season	Top scorer	Team	Points per game
2008	(United States); Quincy Wadley	(Argentina); Peñarol de Mar del Plata	23.1
2009	(Uruguay); Leandro García Morales	(Uruguay); Biguá	24.3
2010	(Uruguay); Leandro García Morales (2×) & (Venezuela); Héctor Romero	(Mexico); Halcones UV Xalapa & (Venezuela); Espartanos de Margarita	20.5
2011	(Panama); Jaime Lloreda	(Mexico); Halcones Rojos	19.8
2012	(United States); Tony Washam	(Argentina); Obras Sanitarias	19.6
2013	(United States); Shamell	(Brazil); Pinheiros	20.2
2014	(Uruguay); Leandro García Morales (3×)	(Uruguay); Aguada	28.3
2015	(United States); Justin Keenan	(Mexico); Pioneros de Quintana Roo	19.3
2016	(United States); Shamell (2×)	(Brazil); Mogi das Cruzes	18.6
2017	(Argentina); Lucio Redivo	(Argentina); Bahía Basket	22.1
2018	(Argentina); Gabriel Deck	(Argentina); San Lorenzo de Almagro	19.1

== Quinteto Ideal (Ideal Quintet) ==
The Quinteto Ideal (English: Ideal Quintet) is the award for the league's best 5 players of each season.

Season	Position	Player	Club	Refs.
2017	PG	(Puerto Rico) Carlos Arroyo	(Puerto Rico) Leones de Ponce	
2017	SG	(Argentina) Lucio Redivo	(Argentina) Weber Bahía Basket	
2017	SF	(United States) Zach Graham	(Venezuela) Guaros de Lara	
2017	PF	(Argentina) Gabriel Deck	(Argentina) San Lorenzo	
2017	C	(Venezuela) Gregory Echenique	(Venezuela) Guaros de Lara	

== See also ==
- FIBA Americas League
- FIBA Americas League Final 4
