= Pablo Sebastián Rodríguez =

Argentine former basketball player (born 1978)

Tato Rodríguez
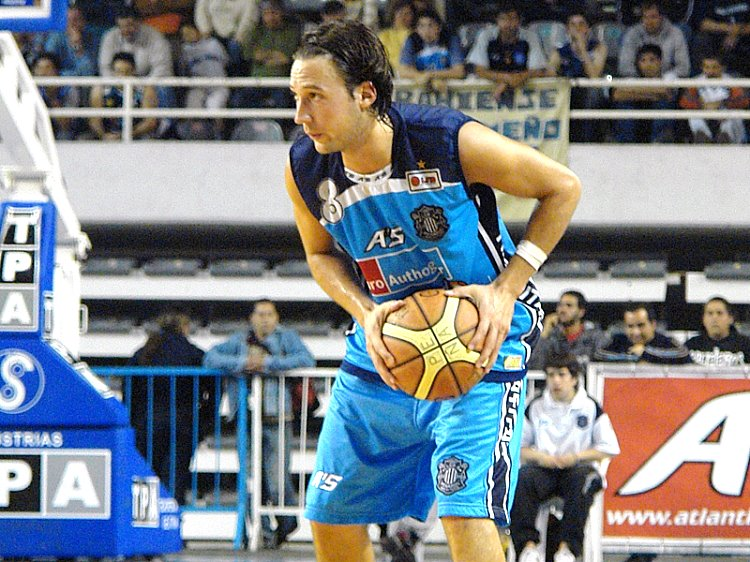
- Rodríguez playing for Peñarol in 2007.

Personal information
- Born: October 6, 1978 (age 46); Mar del Plata, Argentina
- Listed height: 1.88 m (6 ft 2 in)
- Position: Point guard
- Number: 8

Career history
- 1994–1998: Peñarol
- 1998–1999: Ciclista Juninense
- 1999–2003: Peñarol (MDP)
- 2003–2004: Boca Juniors
- 2004–2011: Peñarol (MDP)

Career highlights and awards
- List: 2× FIBA Americas League champion; 3× Liga Nacional champion; 1× Torneo Súper 8 winner; 1× Copa Desafío winner; 2× Liga Nacional assist leader; N° 8 retired by Peñarol (2011)

Pablo Sebastián "Tato" Rodríguez (born October 6, 1978) is an Argentine former basketball player. He spent most of his career at Marplatense Club Peñarol, where he played during 15 seasons until September 2011. Rodríguez was forced to leave the professional activity after he was diagnosed with heart problems.

Rodríguez's health problem was similar to the illness that affected other basketball players such as Fabricio Oberto and Leonardo Gutiérrez, but unlike him, Oberto and Gutiérrez could continue playing basketball.

Rodríguez played 610 matches for Peñarol, scoring 7,106 points (including 996 three-point field goals). He also won three Liga Nacional championships.

On November 24, 2011, Peñarol paid tribute to "Tato" Rodríguez retiring his emblematic number 8 jersey. The retirement ceremony was held before the match that Peñarol disputed against Estudiantes de Bahía Blanca in Mar del Plata.

== Career ==
- Peñarol (1994–98, 1999–2003, 2004–11)
- Ciclista Juninense (1998–99)
- Boca Juniors (2003–04)

== Honours ==
=== Club ===
Boca Juniors

- Liga Nacional (1): 2003–04

Peñarol

- FIBA Americas League (2): 2007–08, 2009–10
- Liga Nacional (2): 2009–10, 2010–11
- Torneo Súper 8 (2): 2006, 2009
- Copa Desafío (1): 2006–07

=== Individual ===
- Best three-point field goal average in second division (TNA): 1998–99
- Best three-point field goal average in first division: 1999–2000
- Best assistance player of the season: 2004–05, 2005–06
- Number 8 retired by Peñarol: (2011)
