= 2009–10 FIBA Americas League =

FIBA Americas League 2009–10
- League: FIBA Americas League
- Sport: Basketball
- Duration: December 6, 2009 – February 6, 2010
- Top scorer: (Uruguay) Leandro García Morales (Halcones Xalapa) (Venezuela) Héctor Romero (Espartanos de Margarita)

Finals
- Champions: (Argentina) Peñarol de Mar del Plata
- Runners-up: (Venezuela) Espartanos de Margarita
- Grand Final MVP: (United States) Kyle Lamonte (Peñarol de Mar del Plata)

FIBA Americas League seasons
- ← 2008–09 2010–11 →

The 2009–10 FIBA Americas League was the third edition of the first-tier and most important professional international club basketball competition in the regions of South America, Central America, the Caribbean, and Mexico, with the winner of the competition being crowned as the best team and champion of all of those regions. It was played between December 6, 2009 and February 6, 2010. The tournament was won by the Argentine League club Peñarol Mar del Plata, which was their second title in three years.

== Group stage ==
=== Group A ===
Team	W	L	Pts	PF	PA
(Argentina) Quimsa	3	0	6	234	214
(Argentina) Atenas de Cordoba	2	1	5	271	234
(Mexico) Soles de Mexicali	1	2	4	228	252
(Brazil) Minas Tênis Clube	0	3	3	246	279

=== Group B ===
Team	W	L	Pts	PF	PA
(Venezuela) Espartanos de Margarita	2	1	5	265	271
(Mexico) Halcones Rojos Veracruz	2	1	5	273	266
(Brazil) Flamengo	1	2	4	223	219
(Puerto Rico) Capitanes de Arecibo	1	2	4	247	252

=== Group C ===
Team	W	L	Pts	PF	PA
(Mexico) Halcones de Xalapa	3	0	6	290	216
(Argentina) Obras Sanitarias	2	1	5	245	259
(Brazil) Joinville Esporte Clube	1	2	4	241	260
(Uruguay) Malvin	0	3	3	245	286

=== Group D ===
Team	W	L	Pts	PF	PA
(Argentina) Peñarol	3	0	6	249	195
(Brazil) Brasília	2	1	5	255	245
(Mexico) Halcones UV Córdoba	1	2	4	237	227
(Panama) Navieros de Colón	0	3	3	194	268

== Final 4 ==
Team	W	L	Pts	PF	PA
(Argentina) Peñarol	3	0	6	272	222
(Venezuela) Esparantos de Margarita	1	2	4	222	236
(Mexico) Halcones Xalapa	1	2	4	272	272
(Argentina) Quimsa	1	2	4	221	257

=== Round 1 ===
February 4
18:00

(Report)

Halcones Xalapa (Mexico)	99–101	(Argentina) Quimsa
Scoring by quarter: 27-30, 19-16, 24-24, 29-31
Pts: Orlando Méndez 29; Rebs: Jack Michael Martínez 11; Asts: Méndez and Martínez 3 each		Pts: Román González 31; Rebs: Dionisio Gomez 10; Asts: Jonatan Treise 6

Polideportivo Islas Malvinas, Mar del Plata, Argentina

February 4
20:15

(Report)

Peñarol (Argentina)	92–73	(Venezuela) Espartanos de Margarita
Scoring by quarter: 32-17, 12-18, 26-24, 22-14
Pts: Leonardo Gutiérrez 20; Rebs: Leonardo Gutiérrez 7 Asts: Pablo Rodriguez 8		Pts: Kevin Freeman 16; Rebs: Herrera and Matthews 8 each Asts: Edgar Moreno 4

Polideportivo Islas Malvinas, Mar del Plata, Argentina

=== Round 2 ===
February 5
18:00

(Report)

Espartanos de Margarita (Venezuela)	78–82	(Mexico) Halcones Xalapa
Scoring by quarter: 18-19, 26-23, 21-20, 13-20
Pts: Héctor Romero 22; Rebs: Héctor Romero 12; Asts: Rafael Guevara 4		Pts: Leandro Garcia 25; Rebs: Jack Michael Martínez 10; Asts: Leandro Garcia 5

Polideportivo Islas Malvinas, Mar del Plata, Argentina

February 5
20:15

(Report)

Quimsa (Argentina)	58–87	(Argentina) Peñarol
Scoring by quarter: 10-19, 15-25, 14-25, 19-18
Pts: Julio Mázzaro 18; Rebs: 3 tied with 5 Asts: 7 tied with 1		Pts: Rodriguez and Lamonte 19 each Rebs: Martín Leiva 10; Asts: Pablo Rodriguez 5

Polideportivo Islas Malvinas, Mar del Plata, Argentina

=== Round 3 ===
February 6
18:00

(Report)

Quimsa (Argentina)	62–71	(Venezuela) Espartanos de Margarita
Scoring by quarter: 7-15, 22-14, 17-23, 16-19
Pts: Román González 21; Rebs: Dionisio Gomez 12; Asts: 3 tied with 2		Pts: Héctor Romero 17; Rebs: Héctor Romero 11; Asts: Rafael Guevara 5

Polideportivo Islas Malvinas, Mar del Plata, Argentina

February 6
20:15

(Report)

Peñarol (Argentina)	93–91 (OT)	(Mexico) Halcones Xalapa
Scoring by quarter: 20-15, 24-20, 11-19, 28-29, Overtime: 10-8
Pts: Kyle Lamonte 39; Rebs: Martín Leiva 16; Asts: Leonardo Gutiérrez 4		Pts: Gerald Brown 21; Rebs: Victor Mariscal 8 Asts: 2 tied with 3

Polideportivo Islas Malvinas, Mar del Plata, Argentina
