= Horacio Llamas =

Mexican basketball player (born 1973)

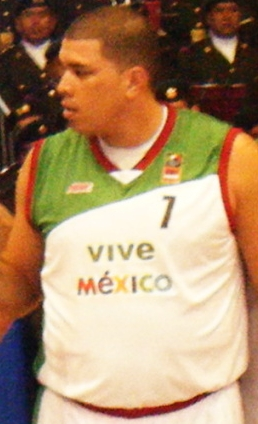

Personal information
- Born: July 17, 1973 (age 53) El Rosario, Sinaloa, Mexico
- Listed height: 7 ft 0 in (2.13 m)
- Listed weight: 305 lb (138 kg)

Career information
- College: Pima CC (1992–1994); Grand Canyon (1994–1996)
- NBA draft: 1996: undrafted
- Playing career: 1996–2013
- Position: Center
- Number: 17
- Coaching career: 2013–present

Career history

Playing
- 1996–1997: Sioux Falls Skyforce
- 1997–1998: Phoenix Suns
- 2001-2002: Phoenix Eclipse
- 2002: KK Crvena zvezda
- 2003: UB La Palma
- 2005-2010: Soles de Mexicali
- 2010-2012: Pioneros de Quintana Roo

Career highlights
- FIBA Americas League champion (2012); CIBACOPA champion (2010); LNBP champion (2006); CIMEBA champion (2001); CBA All-Rookie Second Team (1997); NCAA Division II Player of the Year (1996); Third-team Division II All-American (1996); 2× First-team CCAA (1995, 1996); Second-team All-ACCAC (1994); Third-team All-ACCAC (1993)
- Stats at NBA.com
- Stats at Basketball Reference

Horacio Llamas Grey (born July 17, 1973) is a Mexican former professional basketball player. He played two seasons with the Phoenix Suns of the National Basketball Association (NBA), becoming the first Mexican-born player in NBA history. He currently serves as an assistant coach for Astros de Jalisco in the Liga Nacional de Baloncesto Profesional (LNBP).

== Early years ==
Llamas was born in El Rosario, Sinaloa, Mexico, the first child of Horacio and Ana Luisa Llamas. He practiced karate from the age of two, followed by baseball, and did not begin playing basketball until he was 15.

== College career ==
Llamas was discovered by Pima Community College head coach Mike Lopez, who was shown a picture of Llamas by one of his players, who was also from Sinaloa. He played for two years at Pima Community College in Tucson, Arizona. As a freshman he averaged 15.4 points, 7.2 rebounds and 2.1 blocks per game, earning third-team All-Arizona Community College Athletic Conference (ACCAC) honors. He earned second-team All-ACCAC honors as a sophomore, even recording 52 points and 11 rebounds in a game against Arizona Western College.

Instead of attending an NCAA Division I college, Llamas chose Division II Grand Canyon University where he earned NCAA Division II Player Of The Year honors during his senior season. He also set school records for blocks in a game (10), season (106) and career (172).

== Professional career ==
Llamas was invited to try out for the Atlanta Hawks, but he was released after training camp. He subsequently joined the Sioux Falls Skyforce of the Continental Basketball Association (CBA), where he averaged 8.2 points, 4.9 rebounds and 1.7 blocks per game. The Skyforce went 35–3 with Llamas in the lineup, and he was named to the CBA All-Rookie second team.

On February 21, 1997, Llamas signed a 10-day contract with the injury-riddled Phoenix Suns. He chose to wear jersey number 17 which is the date of his birthday. He made his NBA debut against the Dallas Mavericks on March 2 at Reunion Arena, playing four minutes and scoring on his only attempt in a 109–108 win. He became the first Mexican to participate in an NBA game. After signing a second 10-day contract, he was signed for the rest of the season. He played in most of the games left that season. His first career start saw him play a career-high 24 minutes with six points, four rebounds, one assist and one steal in a 109–96 home win over the Houston Rockets. Llamas played in 20 games during his debut season, averaging of 1.7 points, 0.9 rebounds and 0.2 assists per game.

In the 1997-98 season, he played in eight games, three games in November, one game in February and four in April. He averaged 3.0 points, 2.3 rebounds and 0.1 assists per game and never saw any more than 8 minutes on the court. He had an NBA career-best 7 points including a 3-pointer in his final game for the Suns in a 123–93 thrashing at Houston in the final game of the regular season. After 28 games in two seasons with the Suns, Llamas was released after the 1997–98 season. His production totals may have been adversely affected by his not playing many minutes: in his 28 games, he only saw action a total of 143 minutes, for an average of 5 minutes per game. On the other hand, local newspapers reported during his stint that his conditioning was said to be poor, at least initially.

Llamas had an impact in the Phoenix community, partly because of the large amount of Hispanics who live there. Soon after he began playing with the Suns, he was featured on the cover of the Suns' magazine, Fastbreak. Hoping to keep on bringing Hispanic fans to their home games, the Suns acquired Puerto Rico's Daniel Santiago soon after Llamas was released.

Llamas played in Mexico until he signed with the Phoenix Eclipse of the American Basketball Association for the 2001–02 season. Llamas then played with KK Crvena zvezda. He also had a stint in Spain in 2003, averaging 9.5 points and 5.4 rebounds per game across ten appearances with UB La Palma.

Llamas attempted NBA comebacks with the Washington Wizards in 2002 and with the Milwaukee Bucks in 2004, but was not signed on either occasion. He returned to Mexico to play with the Soles de Mexicali of the Liga Nacional de Baloncesto Profesional (LNBP), appearing with the team from 2005 to 2010 and winning a league title in 2006. Llamas subsequently joined the Pioneros de Quintana Roo, where he won a FIBA Americas League title in 2012 under coach Josep Clarós.

In Mexico, Llamas played in the Circuito Mexicano de Básquetbol (CIMEBA) for the Gallos de Ciudad Juárez and the Soles de Jalisco. He played in the LNBP for the Lechugueros de León, Soles de Mexicali and Pioneros de Quintana Roo. He also played in the Circuito de Baloncesto de la Costa del Pacífico (CIBACOPA) for the Venados de Mazatlán, Cañeros Dorados de Navolato, Trigueros de Ciudad Obregón, Caballeros de Culiacán and Lagartos UAN Tepic. In the Liga de Básquetbol Estatal de Chihuahua (LBE), he played for the Choriceros de Camargo.

== National team career ==
Llamas was the starting center for the Mexico national basketball team, and he participated in international events such as the 1993 Central American and Caribbean Games, held in Ponce, Puerto Rico. He also competed in tournaments such as the FIBA Americas Championship, Centrobasket and FIBA COCABA Championship.

== Post-playing career ==
Llamas retired in 2013 as a member of the Pioneros de Quintana Roo, staying with the team as an assistant coach. The Pioneros also retired his #17 jersey.

In 2016, Llamas was hired as the academy director of the Garzas de Plata de la UAEH, a returning member of the LNBP.

In 2019, Llamas was named the sporting director at the Asociación Deportiva Mexicana de Básquetbol. He joined the Astros de Jalisco as an assistant coach in 2022.
