= Asociación Deportiva Mexicana de Básquetbol =

Governing body of basketball in Mexico

- Formation: 2008
- Location: Mexico
- President: Modesto Robledo
- Website: ademeba.mx

The Asociación Deportiva Mexicana de Básquetbol (ADEMEBA) is the governing body of basketball in Mexico. It was established in 2008.

ADEMEBA is recognized by FIBA and has taken the place of the FMB as the national basketball organization for Mexico.

The organization is currently directed by Modesto Robledo.

== See also ==
- Liga Nacional de Baloncesto Profesional
- Federación Mexicana de Baloncesto
