= Final four =

Last four teams remaining in a sports playoff tournament

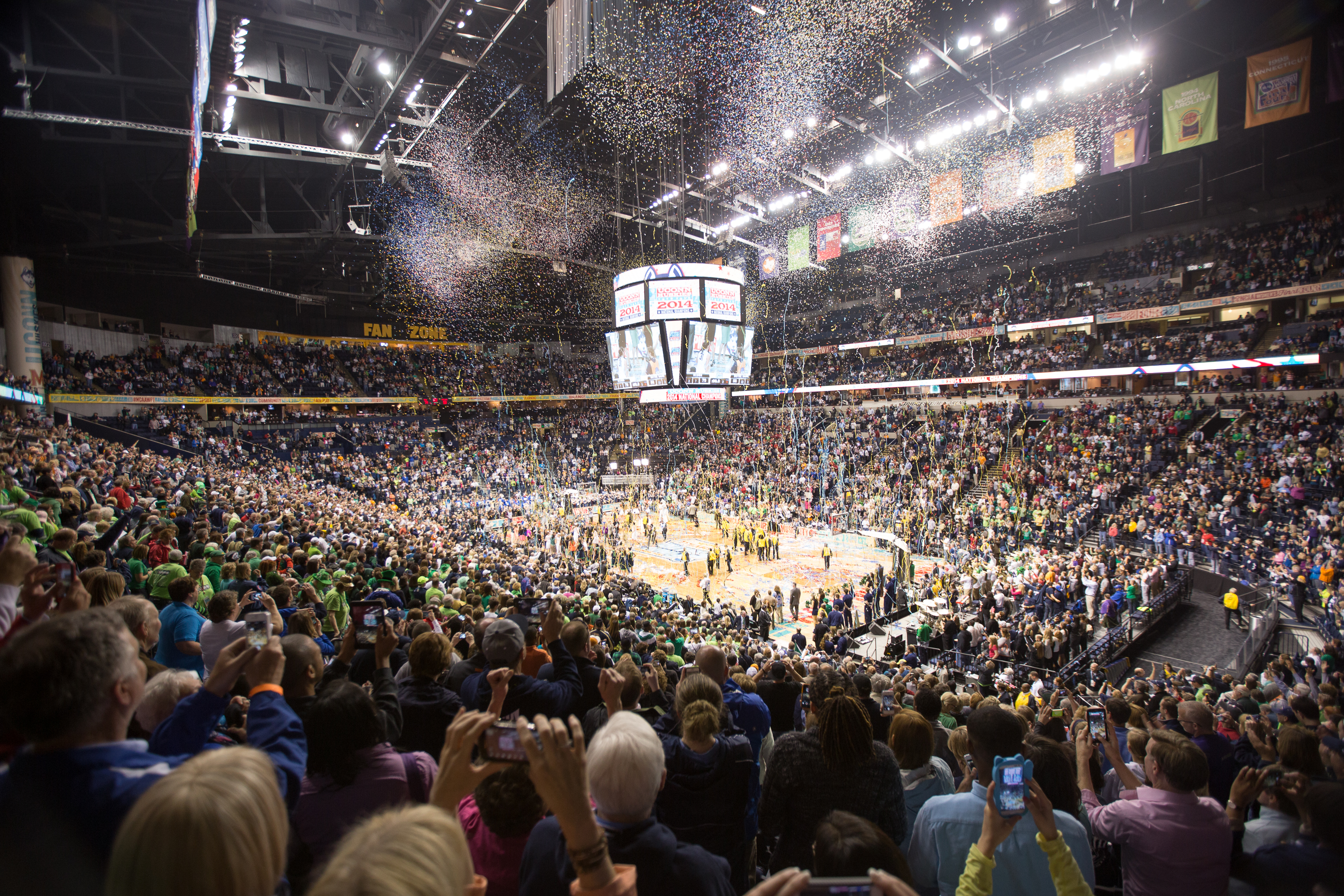
An example of a final four event

In sports, the final four is the last four teams remaining in a playoff tournament. Usually the final four compete in the two games of a single-elimination tournament's semi-final (penultimate) round. Of these teams, the two who win in the semi-final round play another single-elimination game whose winner is the tournament champion. In some tournaments, the two teams that lose in the semi-final round compete for third place in a consolation game.

== History ==
The term "final four" is most often used in the United States and in sports heavily influenced by that country; elsewhere, only the term "semi-finals" is in common use. Previously, it was believed that the phrase "final four" first appeared in print in a 1975 article for the Official Collegiate Basketball Guide, whose author Ed Chay was a sportswriter for the Cleveland Plain Dealer. Chay stated that the Marquette basketball team "was one of the final four" during the previous season's tournament. The myth that "final four" was first used in 1975 is refuted by the fact that the term "final four" was in widespread use in descriptions of the NCAA basketball tournament by the 1960s. For example, Bill Mayer of the Kansas-based Lawrence Daily Journal World wrote in 1966, "What a great year it could be if ... KU ... could advance to the NCAA Final Four by winning the regional here." The National Collegiate Athletic Association (NCAA) later trademarked the term.

The oldest and most common use of the term is in reference to the final four teams in the annual NCAA basketball tournaments: each Final Four team is the champion from one of four regions of the tournament. These regional champions then travel from the four separate sites of their regional rounds to a common venue for the Final Four. A team must advance through multiple rounds of play—typically winning four to five consecutive games in a field of 64 (or 68) teams—to qualify for the Final Four. These four teams are matched against each other on the last weekend of the tournament. The Final Four of the men's Division I tournament is traditionally held on a Saturday, while the Final Four of the women's Division I tournament is usually played on a Friday.

During the Final Four of the men's Division I tournament, the national anthem was sung by four student-athletes from the four semi-finalist schools with one student-athlete representing each school.

The NCAA also uses "Final Four" for other sports besides basketball, such as men's and women's volleyball championships. For ice hockey tournaments, the NCAA uses a variation of the term—"Frozen Four".

== Registered trademark ==
Because the term is now a registered trademark of the NCAA in the United States, no other organizations in that country can use the phrase to refer to their tournaments. Organizations in other countries may officially do so. Many basketball organizations outside the U.S. use the term for the semifinal and final rounds of their tournaments such as the FIBA Americas League (FIBA Americas League Final 4), the EuroLeague (EuroLeague Final Four), the Champions League (Champions League Final Four), the Israeli Premier League, the Philippine NCAA, and the University Athletic Association of the Philippines. The CEV Champions League in volleyball and the six-a-side soccer competition Baller League also use "Final Four" for their final rounds, but to conform with the NCAA's trademark the Final Four is referred to as the "Finals" in Baller League USA.

Despite the NCAA's registration of "Final Four" as a trademark, the term is still widely used by sportswriters, fans etc. to denote participants in semifinal rounds of professional postseason playoffs, such as those of the League Championship Series in Major League Baseball, the conference championship games in the National Football League, and the conference championship series in both the National Basketball Association and the National Hockey League.

== Non-sports use ==
"Final Four" was used to refer to the crew of STS-135, the final Space Shuttle mission.

The term has also been used in some television shows to denote the last remaining four contestants, such as the Philippine TV series StarStruck and the reality show Survivor.

== See also ==
- List of NCAA men's Division I basketball tournament Final Four participants
