= Ángel Figueroa =

Puerto Rican basketball player

Personal information
- Born: October 13, 1981 (age 45) San Juan, Puerto Rico
- Listed height: 6 ft 5 in (1.96 m)
- Listed weight: 220 lb (100 kg)

Career information
- College: Dowling
- Playing career: 1999–2018
- Position: Forward

Career highlights
- 2× BSN Champion (2005, 2008); BSN Finals MVP (2008); 2× BSN Most Outstanding Player (2007, 2008); 3× BSN All-Star (2006–2008, 2010); BSN Scoring Champion (2007); 3× All-BSN First team (2005, 2007, 2008); 2× All-BSN Second team (2003, 2009); BSN Rookie of the Year (1999); BSN steals leader (2008)
Medals
Men's basketball
Representing Puerto Rico
Central American and Caribbean Games
Gold medal – first place	2006 Cartagena

Ángel Luis "Buster" Figueroa Sepúlveda (born October 13, 1981) is a Puerto Rican professional basketball player for the Capitanes De Arecibo of the BSN league in Puerto Rico. He was a member of the Puerto Rico National Basketball Team in 2006.

== Baloncesto Superior Nacional ==
Figueroa made his professional debut in the National Superior Basketball League of Puerto Rico in 1999. In his first two years he competed with the Guaynabo Mets. On his rookie year he won the Rookie of the Year award after having an average of 15.4 points per game. After two seasons playing for Guaynabo he was traded to the Arecibo Captains in 2001. With Arecibo, Figueroa would be selected to the league's All-Star game on multiple occasions. In between, Figueroa was the nation's leading scorer in NCAA's Division II during the 2001–2002 season at Dowling College. In 2005 he helped the Arecibo Captains win the league's national championship with an average of 19.0 points per game. Figueroa was the National Superior Basketball league's scoring champion in 2006 with an average of 20.7 points per game. During the off-season, he played a single game with Dinamo Basket Sassari of the LegADue, scoring 21 points and capturing 5 rebounds. Figueroa finished the 2007 regular season as the league's top scorer with an average of 24.6 points per game. His performance gained him a participation in the league's All-Star game. Due to his performance in the BSN he was selected to play in the national basketball team, in which he served as a back-up forward. In 2008 he finished the regular BSN in the second scoring position with an average of 21.5 points per game. He was once again selected as a starter in the All-Star game, being the player that received most fan votes in the pre-game poll. On June 6, 2008, Figueroa received the BSN Most Outstanding Player award. He also finished in the second position of the league's MVP votation, receiving 27 votes. In Arecibo Figueroa helped the team win the third BSN Championship in the franchise's history, and was selected the BSN Final's MVP. In the series' final game he scored 33 points and grabbed 22 rebounds against Carolina Giants.

== Liga Nacional de Baloncesto Profesional ==
Following his participation in the BSN, Figueroa signed a contract with the Lobos Grises UAD of the Liga Nacional de Baloncesto Profesional (LNBP). On October 1, 2009, he made his debut against Cosmos, scoring 21 points, 6 rebounds and 4 steals. Figueroa concluded his first week with 34 points, 15 rebounds and 3 steals in games against the Soles and Potros. He then scored 18 points in two consecutive games, before scoring a season-low 10 points to close the week. In his next game, Figueroa recorded 21 points, 6 rebounds and 2 steals against Panteras. In the Lobos' next game, he scored 16 points, with the game marking the first time that he did not make a steal in the season. On October 29, 2009, Figueroa recorded his first double-double of the season against Abejas, with 21 points and 10 rebounds. To close the first month, he registered 22 points, 8 rebounds and 4 steals. After two weeks of inactivity, Figueroa returned but fell into a brief offensive slump, scoring 11 and 12 points in his next two games, but also recovering 17 rebounds. Figueroa improved in a game against Barreteros, where he scored 21 points and 7 rebounds. In the last game of November, he scored 20 points, 8 points and a steal.

== National team career ==
In 2006, Figueroa competed for the Puerto Rico national basketball team in the Central American and Caribbean Games where Puerto Rico went on to win the gold medal finishing with an undefeated record. He was selected as a member of the national team that participated in the 2006 FIBA World Championship, but he was unable to compete due to injury. In June 2008, the national team's directives announced that Figueroa did not have a guaranteed spot in the team. This was product of a new team initiative which focused on height.

In the 2008 FIBA Americas League, Figueroa once again joined Arecibo. In the team's debut against Pioneros, he scored 20 points, 8 rebounds and one steal. Against Merengueros, he had 19 points, 6 rebounds and 2 steals. In Arecibo's final game, Figueroa scored a tournament-high of 26 points, 9 rebounds and 2 steals.
