= FIBA Americas League =

- Founded: 2007; 18 years ago
- First season: 2007–08
- Folded: 2019; 6 years ago
- Replaced by: Basketball Champions; League Americas (BCLA)
- Number of teams: 16
- Level on pyramid: 1
- Most championships: (Venezuela) Guaros de Lara (Argentina) Peñarol (Argentina) San Lorenzo (2 titles)
- CEO: Usie Richards
- TV partners: DSports
- Website: FIBA.basketball/ligamericas
- 2019 FIBA Americas League

The FIBA Americas League (Portuguese: FIBA Liga das Américas, Spanish: FIBA Liga de las Américas), officially abbreviated as the LDA, was the premier intercontinental basketball club competition played annually by clubs of the entire Americas. Organized by FIBA Americas, the competition was replaced by the Basketball Champions League Americas (BCLA) in September 2019. The inaugural season started on 4 December 2007. The FIBA Americas League was a recreation of the now defunct Pan American Club Championship, that existed from 1993 to 2000.

The winner of the Final Four, the culminating tournament of each season's FIBA Americas League, is crowned as the champion of all of the FIBA Americas zone region. The tournament's final is called the Grand Final. It is the first-tier and most important professional international club basketball competition in the regions of South America, Central America, the Caribbean, and Mexico.

From 2013 to 2015, the winner of each season's FIBA Americas tournament, played against the winner of each season's European top-tier level EuroLeague competition, at the FIBA Intercontinental Cup, in order to determine an official club world cup champion. Since 2016, the champions of the FIBA Americas League contest the FIBA Intercontinental Cup against the champions of one of the two European second-tier level competitions, the European Champions League.

== History ==
In 1993, the Campeonato Panamericano de Clubes de Básquetbol (Pan American Basketball Club Championship) was created as a Pan American tournament, running from 1993 until 2000. In December 2007, the FIBA Americas League was introduced in the second attempt of a panamerican basketball club competition.

The FIBA Americas League was formed in 2007, as a professional intercontinental men's basketball club competition, under the organization of FIBA Americas, with the goal of creating a world-class top level multinational basketball league in the Americas Region including teams from North America this time (apart from the NBA). The league was modeled after the EuroLeague, Europe's top-tier level multinational club basketball league. The main reason for creating the league was the promotion and growth of the sport, and the increased level of competition that would come from the creation of a multinational super league in the FIBA Americas region. The only North American teams participating in the competition (2007–2019) were the former USBL champions Miami Tropics and an All-Star selection team from the Premier Basketball League.

Another one of the main goals in the creation of the league was to eventually revive the dormant FIBA Intercontinental Cup, so that clubs from the FIBA Americas region could once again directly compete against top EuroLeague teams in official games, and so that an official world cup championship could once again be contested. FIBA World decided to revive the FIBA Intercontinental Cup in 2013, deciding that the champions of the FIBA Americas League would play against the champions of the EuroLeague, to decide on the world club champion. It was then decided by FIBA World that the tournament would be played every year from then on for the foreseeable future. Pinheiros was the first team to represent Americas in the Intercontinental Cup. Since 2016, the FIBA Americas League champions play against the champions of one of the two European second-tier level competitions, the FIBA Champions League.

Another goal in creating the league was to form a league system of teams that could form a partnership with the EuroLeague and NBA on playing friendly games during the preseason, in the same way that the EuroLeague and NBA teams were already playing against each other during the preseason. This was finally realized in the 2014–15 preseason, when teams from the FIBA Americas League played against teams from both the EuroLeague and the NBA.

=== Names of the top-tier level Pan American competition ===
  - Campeonato Panamericano de Clubes de Básquetbol (English: Pan American Basketball Club Championship): (1993–2000)
- FIBA Americas era: (2007–2019)
  - FIBA Americas League: (2007 – 2019)
  - FIBA Champions League Americas (2019–present)

== Format ==
Under the original format, 16 participating clubs were divided in four groups, of four teams each. The top two clubs of each group qualified for the quarterfinals. The quarterfinals winners then played a four-team group stage, in a yet to be determined host city.

Under the current format, the 16 participating clubs are divided in four groups, of four teams each. The top two clubs of each group qualify for the semifinals. The semifinals winners qualify to play at the FIBA Americas League Final 4, in a yet to be determined host city. The final four format was held for the first time in 2014. The last game of the tournament is called the Grand Final.

== Final Fours and Grand Finals (2007–2019) ==
Edition	Year	Hosts	Champions	Score and Venue	Runners-up	Third place	Fourth place
1	2007–08; Details	(Mexico); Mexicali	(Argentina); Peñarol	League stage Auditorio del Estado, Mexicali	(Mexico); Soles de Mexicali	(United States); Miami Tropics	(Brazil); Minas
2	2008–09; Details	(Mexico); Xalapa	(Brazil); Brasília	League stage Gimnasio USBI, Xalapa	(Mexico); Halcones UV Xalapa	(Uruguay); Biguá	(Brazil); Minas
3	2009–10; Details	(Argentina); Mar del Plata	(Argentina); Peñarol	League stage Polideportivo Islas Malvinas, Mar del Plata	(Venezuela); Espartanos de Margarita	(Mexico); Halcones UV Xalapa	(Argentina); Quimsa
4	2010–11; Details	(Mexico); Xalapa	(Argentina); Regatas Corrientes	League stage Gimnasio USBI, Xalapa	(Puerto Rico); Capitanes de Arecibo	(Mexico); Halcones UV Xalapa	(Mexico); Halcones Rojos
5	2012; Details	(Argentina); Formosa	(Mexico); Pioneros de Quintana Roo	League stage Estadio Cincuentenario, Formosa	(Argentina); La Unión	(Argentina); Obras Sanitarias	(Brazil); Brasília
6	2013; Details	(Puerto Rico); Arecibo	(Brazil); Pinheiros	League stage Coliseo Manuel "Petaca" Iguina, Areciba	(Argentina); Lanús	(Puerto Rico); Capitanes de Arecibo	(Brazil); Brasília
7	2014; Details	(Brazil); Rio de Janeiro	(Brazil); Flamengo	85–78; Maracanãzinho, Rio de Janeiro	(Brazil); Pinheiros	(Uruguay); Aguada	(Mexico); Halcones UV Xalapa
8	2015; Details	(Brazil); Rio de Janeiro	(Brazil); Bauru	86–72; Maracanãzinho, Rio de Janeiro	(Mexico); Pioneros de Quintana Roo	(Brazil); Flamengo	(Argentina); Peñarol
9	2016; Details	(Venezuela); Barquisimeto	(Venezuela); Guaros de Lara	84–79; Domo Bolivariano, Barquisimeto	(Brazil); Bauru	(Brazil); Mogi das Cruzes	(Brazil); Flamengo
10	2017; Details	(Venezuela); Barquisimeto	(Venezuela); Guaros de Lara	88–65; Domo Bolivariano, Barquisimeto	(Argentina); Weber Bahía Blanca	(Puerto Rico); Leones de Ponce	(Mexico); Fuerza Regia
11	2018; Details	(Argentina); Buenos Aires	(Argentina); San Lorenzo	79–71; Polideportivo Roberto Pando, Buenos Aires	(Brazil); Mogi das Cruzes	(Argentina); Regatas Corrientes	(Argentina); Estudiantes Concordia
12	2019; Details	(Argentina); Buenos Aires	(Argentina); San Lorenzo	64–61; Polideportivo Roberto Pando, Buenos Aires	(Venezuela); Guaros de Lara	(Brazil); Paulistano	(Mexico); Capitanes de la Ciudad de México

== Performances ==
=== By club ===
Team	Winners	Runners-up	Third place	Fourth place
(Venezuela) Guaros de Lara	2 (2016, 2017)	1 (2019)	0	0
(Argentina) Peñarol	2 (2007–08, 2009–10)	0	0	1 (2015)
(Argentina) San Lorenzo de Almagro	2 (2018, 2019)	0	0	0
(Brazil) Bauru	1 (2015)	1 (2016)	0	0
(Brazil) Pinheiros	1 (2013)	1 (2014)	0	0
(Mexico) Pioneros de Quintana Roo	1 (2012)	1 (2015)	0	0
(Brazil) Flamengo	1 (2014)	0	1 (2015)	1 (2016)
(Argentina) Regatas Corrientes	1 (2010–11)	0	1 (2018)	0
(Brazil) Brasília	1 (2008–09)	0	0	2 (2012, 2013)
(Mexico) Halcones UV Xalapa	0	1 (2008–09)	2 (2009–10, 2010–11)	1 (2014)
(Puerto Rico) Capitanes de Arecibo	0	1 (2010–11)	1 (2013)	0
(Brazil) Mogi das Cruzes	0	1 (2018)	1 (2016)	0
(Mexico) Soles de Mexicali	0	1 (2007–08)	0	0
(Venezuela) Espartanos de Margarita	0	1 (2009–10)	0	0
(Argentina) La Unión de Formosa	0	1 (2012)	0	0
(Argentina) Lanús	0	1 (2013)	0	0
(Argentina) Weber Bahía Blanca	0	1 (2017)	0	0
(United States) Miami Tropics	0	0	1 (2007–08)	0
(Uruguay) Biguá	0	0	1 (2008–09)	0
(Argentina) Obras Sanitarias	0	0	1 (2012)	0
(Uruguay) Aguada	0	0	1 (2014)	0
(Puerto Rico) Leones de Ponce	0	0	1 (2017)	0
(Brazil) Paulistano	0	0	1 (2019)	0
(Brazil) Minas	0	0	0	2 (2007–08, 2008–09)
(Argentina) Quimsa	0	0	0	1 (2009–10)
(Mexico) Halcones Rojos	0	0	0	1 (2010–11)
(Mexico) Fuerza Regia	0	0	0	1 (2017)
(Argentina) Estudiantes Concordia	0	0	0	1 (2018)
(Mexico) Capitanes de la Ciudad de México	0	0	0	1 (2019)

=== By country ===
Nation	Winners	Runners-up	Third place	Fourth place
Argentina	5	3	2	3
Brazil	4	3	3	5
Venezuela	2	2	0	0
Mexico	1	3	2	4
Puerto Rico	0	1	2	0
Uruguay	0	0	2	0
United States	0	0	1	0

== See also ==
- FIBA Americas League Final 4
- FIBA Americas League Awards
- Pan American Club Championship
- Basketball Champions League Americas
- FIBA South American League
- South American Championship of Champions Clubs
