= Federación Mexicana de Baloncesto =

Basketball federation in Mexico

The Federación Mexicana de Baloncesto (FMB), formerly known as the Federación Mexicana de Basquetbol, is a nationwide basketball federation in Mexico. It was established in 1936.

FMB participated in the formation of FIBA Americas, 1975. FMB is not recognized by FIBA, which accepted the ADEMEBA as the national basketball organization for Mexico.

The organization is directed by Agustín Villa.

== See also ==
- Asociación Deportiva Mexicana de Básquetbol
