= DeJuan Wheat =

American basketball player (born 1973)

Personal information
- Born: October 14, 1973 (age 53) Louisville, Kentucky, U.S.
- Listed height: 5 ft 11 in (1.80 m)
- Listed weight: 165 lb (75 kg)

Career information
- High school: Ballard (Louisville, Kentucky)
- College: Louisville (1993–1997)
- NBA draft: 1997: 2nd round, 51st overall pick
- Drafted by: Los Angeles Lakers
- Playing career: 1997–2010
- Position: Point guard
- Number: 6, 32

Career history
- 1997–1998: Minnesota Timberwolves
- 1999: Vancouver Grizzlies
- 1999–2000: Idaho Stampede
- 2001–2002: Panteras de Miranda
- 2002–2003: Buffalo City Thunder
- 2003–2004: Juarez Gallos de Pelea
- 2004–2005: Calgary Drillers
- 2005–2010: Soles de Mexicali

Career highlights
- Third-team All-American – NABC (1997); 2× First-team All-Conference USA (1996, 1997); Fourth-team Parade All-American (1992)
- Stats at NBA.com
- Stats at Basketball Reference

DeJuan Shontez Wheat (born October 14, 1973) is an American former professional basketball player, formerly of the NBA's Minnesota Timberwolves and Vancouver Grizzlies. He was a star at the University of Louisville from 1993 to 1997, becoming the first player in NCAA Division I history to amass career totals of at least 2,000 points, 450 assists, 300 three-point field goals and 200 steals.

Louisville's second all-time leader in three-point field goals (323), Wheat ranks second in school history in scoring (2,183 points) and third in assists (498). As a senior, he was named Honorable Mention All-America by The Associated Press, as well as Third Team All-America by the National Association of Basketball Coaches and Second Team All-America by The Sporting News. He led the Cardinals in scoring (17.3), assists (career-high 4.3), steals (career-high 1.94), three-point field goals (career-high 97) and minutes played (34.9 per game) as a senior and had 15 games with 20 or more points. He helped lead his hometown Cards to the Elite Eight in the NCAA Tournament that season.

Wheat was selected 52nd overall in the 1997 NBA draft by the Los Angeles Lakers but was cut in the preseason. He was signed by Minnesota before the regular season began and saw limited action in 34 games, averaging 1.7 points in 4.4 minutes per game during the 1997–98 season. He signed as a free agent with Vancouver on January 29, 1999, and played in 46 of 50 games, all as a reserve, averaging 4.5 points and 2.2 assists in only 12.8 minutes per game.

Wheat retired in 2010, playing his final season in Mexico for Soles de Mexicali.
