= Federico Kammerichs =

Argentine basketball player (born 1980)

Federico "Yacaré" Kammerichs
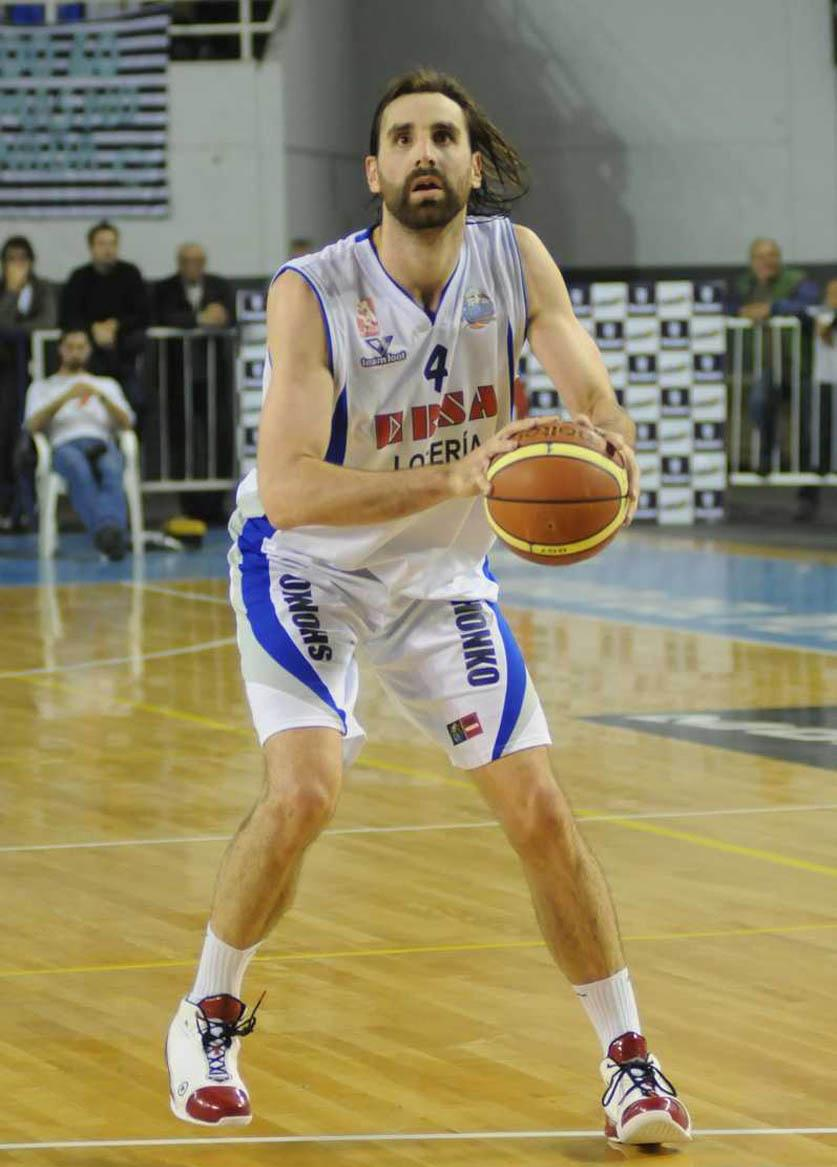
- Kammerichs in 2011

Personal information
- Born: June 21, 1980 (age 46) Goya, Argentina
- Listed height: 6 ft 8.75 in (2.05 m)
- Listed weight: 245 lb (111 kg)

Career information
- NBA draft: 2002: 2nd round, 51st overall pick
- Drafted by: Portland Trail Blazers
- Playing career: 1998–2015
- Position: Power forward

Career history
- 1998–2001: Ferro Carril Oeste
- 2001–2002: Ourense
- 2002–2005: Valencia
- 2005–2006: Girona
- 2006–2007: Bruesa GBC
- 2007–2008: Murcia
- 2008–2011: Regatas
- 2011–2012: Flamengo
- 2012–2013: Regatas
- 2014: Juventud Unida de Goya
- 2014–2015: Club Atlético Unión Goya

Career highlights
- FIBA Americas League Grand Finals MVP (2011); NBB All Star (2012); 2× Liga Nacional de Básquet rebounding leader (2009, 2010); Super 8 Tournament MVP (2008)
- Stats at Basketball Reference
Medals
Men's basketball
Representing Argentina
Summer Olympic Games
Bronze medal – third place	2008 Beijing
FIBA Diamond Ball
Gold medal – first place	2008 Nanjing
FIBA AmeriCup
Silver medal – second place	2003 San Juan
Silver medal – second place	2005 Santo Domingo
Silver medal – second place	2007 Las Vegas
Bronze medal – third place	2009 San Juan
Gold medal – first place	2011 Mar del Plata
FIBA South American Championship
Silver medal – second place	2003 Montevideo

Guillermo Federico Kammerichs (born June 21, 1980) is an Argentine retired professional basketball player, who last played with Unión de Goya. At 6 ft 8 3/4 in (2.05 m) tall and 245 lbs. (111 kg) in weight, he could play at the small forward and power forward positions.

== Professional career ==
Some of the clubs Kammerichs played with professionally included: Ferro Carril Oeste of the Argentine League (1998–01), Ourense of the Spanish Second Division (2001–02), Valencia (2002–05), Girona (2005–06), Bruesa GBC (2006–07), Murcia (2007–08) of the Spanish First Division, and Flamengo of the Brazilian League (2011–12). He went back to Argentina after a year, at the end of his season with Flamengo, to play again with Regatas.

Kammerichs was selected by the Portland Trail Blazers in the 2nd round (51st pick overall) of the 2002 NBA draft but ended up never playing in a single NBA game (making him 1 of 9 players selected in that draft that never played in the league).

== National team career ==
Kammerichs defended Argentina at FIBA Americas Championships: a gold medal 2011, silver medals at the 2003, 2005, and 2007), and bronze medal in 2009. They brought home a bronze medal at both the 2008 Summer Olympic Games.

== Personal life ==
Born and raised in Argentina, Kammerichs also holds German citizenship, because he is of German descent.

== Awards and accomplishments ==
=== Pro career ===
- EuroCup Champion: (2003)
- Super 8 Tournament Winner: (2008)
- Super 8 Tournament MVP: (2008)
- FIBA Americas League Grand Finals MVP: (2011)

=== Argentina national team ===
- 2003 South American Championship: Silver
- 2003 FIBA Americas Championship: Silver
- 2005 FIBA Americas Championship: Silver
- 2007 FIBA Americas Championship: Silver
- 2008 FIBA Diamond Ball Tournament: Gold
- 2008 Summer Olympic Games: Bronze
- 2009 FIBA Americas Championship: Bronze
- 2011 FIBA Americas Championship: Gold
