= Gimnasio USBI =

Indoor arena in Xalapa, Mexico

- Location: 101 Av. Culturas Veracruz; Xalapa, Veracruz, 91040
- Owner: Universidad Veracruzana
- Operator: Universidad Veracruzana
- Capacity: Basketball: 2,638; Concerts: 3,000

Construction
- Groundbreaking: 2001
- Opened: 2003
- Cost: $2 Million
- Architect: FAUV
- General contractor: Constructora Pakal

Tenants
- Halcones UV Xalapa (2003–present)

Gimnasio USBI is an indoor arena that is located in Xalapa, Veracruz, Mexico. It is the home arena of the LNBP professional basketball team Halcones UV Xalapa. It was created when the city of Xalapa was granted an expansion team, and the Universidad Veracruzana offered its recently planned arena to the team for its use.

It hosted 2021 FIBA Under-16 Americas Championship held 23–29 August 2021.
