= Halcones Rojos Veracruz =

- Leagues: LNBP
- Founded: 2003
- Dissolved: 2025
- Arena: Auditorio Benito Juarez
- Capacity: 4,000
- Location: Veracruz, Veracruz, Mexico
- Team colors: Crimson, White, and Black
- President: Ricardo Rodríguez Díaz
- Head coach: Carlos Rivera
- Championships: LNBP 1 (2011-12) *FIBA Americas League 0
- Website: halconesrojos.com
Home	Away

Halcones Rojos Veracruz was a men's Mexican professional basketball team based in Veracruz.

== History ==
After two successful seasons on the basketball team Halcones UV Xalapa, and seeing how the fans to the sport was growing in the state of Veracruz, it was decided to acquire a franchise for the city of Veracruz had a basketball team and so continue promoting the sport in Veracruz territory. On 1 May 2005 the official announcement was made, the birth of the Falcons Campus Veracruz Universidad Veracruzana (UV Hawks Veracruz). With this, the state of Veracruz and has two teams (both representing the UV) LNBP participating in the league of the country's largest basketball.

=== Seasons ===
==== 2005 ====
Putting together a team without a lot of planning and a little less than a month after starting the 2005 season, the RedHawks (so Called by the governor Fidel Herrera Beltrán) surprised the league to qualify for the play-off for second place in the South Zone. Under the orders of the Mexican coach Jose Luis "Satan" Creeks, and with an initial staff of 15 players: Karim Malpica, Oscar Castellanos, Alonso Izaguirre, Hector Martinez, Octavio Robles, Francisco Morales, Roberto Elicerio, Juan Escalante, Francisco Ibarra, Veracruz and Iván Hernández and Arnulfo Antonio Valenzuela Valenzuela, plus Americans Craig Jackson, Christopher Ferguson and Lataryl Williams, the RedHawks opened the season against the Red Wave of the Federal District with a defeat as a visitor, but they turned out to be the surprise team of the season in his debut campaign, being second in the South at the end of his first foray into the league. Remarkably, the three foreigners who began the season were changed by their poor performance and were replaced by the Americans also Antonio " La Chispa" Rivers, Carlus Groves and Jason Love Lawson. In the first round of the play-off, the feathered eliminated the Fresnillo Gambusinos by 3 games to 1, but the surprise ended when Leon Lechugueros defeated the RedHawks 4-0 in the semifinals of area.

==== 2006 ====
Their second season (2006), repeated 7 of the 15 players who participated in the campaign of 2005, which were: Oscar "El Diablo" Castellanos (Team Captain), Alonso Izaguirre, Francisco Morales, Francisco Ibarra and Veracruz Iván Hernández, Antonio Arnulfo Valenzuela and Valenzuela, and coach Jose Luis "Satan" Arroyos. The team was strengthened in all positions with 7 new additions, totaling a Roster of 14 players, including new acquisitions were : Jorge Rochin (Who came to be considered the best Mexican player in the 2005 season with Lechugueros Leon), the Mexican-American Rafael Berumen (Sourced from the Fuerza Regia Monterrey), the Mexican -American Daniel Anaya (It came to shine with Barreteros Zacatecas) and also Mexican-American José Escobedo (which had shone with UV Xalapa Falcons, but that was only a month on the computer). Besides Americans Charles Edward Byrd (Star in leagues in Brazil, Venezuela and France), Eric Allen Strand (Star in the Venezuelan league) and Terquin Mott (Superstar in Venezuela), but the team proved a total failure by not past the first round of the playoffs after falling 3 games to 2 against the Panthers of Aguascalientes at Auditorio "Benito Juárez" itself. Due to disciplinary problems, the team never gave what was expected of him, being totally inconsistent during the regular season. Note that the only foreign player that was maintained throughout the season was Charles "Bird" Byrd since Eric Allen Strand Terquin Mott and caused low early in the season. Other foreigners who also spent time on the computer was the American Toraino Johnson, however he did not meet expectations and was dropped. Finally the other two foreign players who finished the season with the RedHawks were also American Justin Howard Bradford and Willie Davis Jr.

==== 2007-08 ====
In early 2007, the club's board announced the dismissal of equipment with respect to UV, running officially named Veracruz RedHawks. For the 2007-2008 season, 7 players of the 14 players from the previous season returned, which were: Oscar "El Diablo" Castellanos (Team Captain), Alonso Izaguirre, Francisco Ibarra (a time the team was absent for personal reasons) and Veracruz Ivan Hernandez, Arnulfo Antonio Valenzuela and Valenzuela. In addition to the American Charles "Bird" Byrd (He was discharged not fully recover from an injury). Unlike the previous two seasons in the Buenos Aires team was led by José Luis "Satan " Brooks, for this year the new coach was Enrique Ortega team, however due to the poor results he was replaced on an interim basis by Adam Saldaña (who was the assistant Ortega), to finally finish the tournament under the mandate of the U.S. coach Chuck Michael Skarshaug. For this tournament 8 new players were added: Hector Nungaray (Coming Royals Santos de San Luis), César Briseno (Sourced from Royals Santos de San Luis, and was discharged), Juan Manuel Veracruz Esteva (Sourced from Gambusinos Fresnillo), Jorge Luis Hernandez (low player required by the league), Omar Gonzalez (low player required by the league), and the Mexican-American Rick Torres (Discharged early in the season), in addition to U.S. Reginald Jordan (Former NBA and the Comets from Querétaro to superstar status LNBP) and Lawrence Nelson (Algodoneros coming of the Shire, and it came as the best center League last season, however he was discharged to his low performance). It is noteworthy that replacing Rick Torres came in place Edgar Soto (Sourced from the Maya of Yucatán). As Gerald Eaker (sorry had to be dropped because of a thrombosis of the leg), who came to fill the seat left vacant César Briseno. Moreover, the Mexican-American Gilberto Sanchez (Sourced from Comets de Querétaro) joined the team after an absence of Francisco Ibarra. Just as the U.S. Lamar Castile (Coming Roadrunner UAT Victoria, and lasted less than a month in the team), who came to cover the floor of the also foreign player Charles "Bird" Byrd (At which he was offered the post of assistant Coach, and did not accept), who did not fully recover from the injury he suffered in the final of the South Zone of the Independence Cup at the Lechugueros Lion, the early season. On the other hand, the U.S. joined Casey Love the template to take its place also let down the American Lawrence Nelson. In the area of foreign players, the U.S. Lawayne Gouards Da Juan was on trial for covering the floor of Lamar Castile, however this does not live up to expectations and was not activated within the roster. Finally, the American Michael Joseph Adams came to fill the seat left by Lamar Castile. In the last game of the regular season against the Pioneers of Quintana Roo, debuted with the RedHawks youth George Lohmann, Wilfredo Rodriguez and Alejandro Ruano, who along with Jorge Hernandez and Omar Gonzalez who were throughout the season with the team, made that comply with Rule 120 minutes played by trace elements of 20 years. After the 2007-2008 season, the RedHawks concluded as the 12th. Instead of the General Table, and the 4th. place in the South Zone with 25 brand won and 23 lost, being this far his worst season so far in its history within the LNBP in the regular season. In the first stage of the play-off, the RedHawks faced the Pioneers of Quintana Roo, in which they won the series 3 games to 1 and going to the semifinals of the Southern Zone. However, the red feathered fell to the Semifinals Zone UV Xalapa Falcons by 3 games to 1, where finally the absences through injury of captain Oscar " El Diablo " Castellanos, Hector Nungaray and Gerald Eaker is disrupted.

==== 2008-09 ====
For the 2008-2009 season, 5 of 15 players returned from the previous season, which were: Oscar "El Diablo" Castellanos (Team Captain), Alonso Izaguirre, Hector "El Raton" Nungaray, Gerald Eaker (As of through injury) and Iván Hernández Veracruz. 10 new players were added: Miguel Ayala (Sourced from Panthers Aguascalientes), the Mexican -American Noah Brown (Algodoneros Coming of the Shire), the U.S. national Mexican Michael Saulsberry (Sourced from the Grey Wolves of the UAD, but was discharged almost starting the season), youth Melesio Uscanga and Raul Navarro (Product of tryouts conducted by the directive), the Dominican Jack Michael Martinez (Player selected from his country debut in LNPB) renowned Costa Rican Hernol Hall (selected from his country from Liceo de Costa Rica, and also made his debut in the LNBP) plus Americans Cleotis Brown (coming from Quimsa of Argentina and former Hawks player UV Xalapa), William McFarlan (Coming from Quimsa of Argentina and debutant LNBP) and Calvin Cage (Coming basketball Cyprus, but was discharged early in the season). Finally, the Puerto Rican Bobby Joe Hatton joined the team in place of Calvin Cage Base template for a total of 13 elements, since the low of Pivots Michael Saulsberry and Gerald Eaker were not covered. Note that the Buenos Aires team started the season under Mexican coach Luis Manuel "El Chango" Lopez, but this was dropped for the poor results obtained and the poor relationship he had with several of the players, and was replaced by Manolo Cintron Puerto Rican coach much prestige in Latin America that had won the 2008 directing Centrobasket selecting your country.1 This season, feathered red mark got 34 wins 13 losses, and a game suspended Aguascalientes to the Panthers in the final game of the regular season, running in second place in the South Zone and fourth of the General Board. In the first stage of the postseason, the locals removed the Royals St. Louis Saints by 3 games to 2, but fell in the semifinals to the UV region Córdoba Hawks 4 games to 1, in which undoubtedly downward William McFarlan (replaced by U.S. Jarret Stephens) for indiscipline weighed too much and ended up finishing with the aspirations of jarocho team get to the end zone.

==== 2009-10 ====
For the 2009-2010 season, returned 6 players who participated last season, which were : Oscar "El Diablo" Castellanos (Team Captain), Alonso Izaguirre, Hector " El Raton " Nungaray, Miguel Ayala, Raul Navarro and Veracruz Melesio Uscanga. Eight new players were added: Joel Reynoso (Youth from UDLAP), Edward Ayileke (Youth from the ITESM), the Veracruz Sunday Montalvo (Sourced from the deer Nuevo Laredo), Puerto Ricans Carlos Rivera (Sourced from Arecibo Captains) and Angelo Reyes (Coming Carolina Giants), besides Americans Daimon Gonner (Sourced from Piedras Negras Braves), Lawrence Hill (Sourced Stanford University) and Jeff Aubry (Sourced from the Dorados de Chihuahua). Note that because the Board of the league did not give the support to the player to play with Angelo Reyes status Latin, also Puerto Rican Ricky Sanchez (Sourced from Humacao Grays) came to occupy the space vacated this. On the other hand, the U.S. team Edner Elisma came to replace Jeff Aubry, because the latter had to be out of the club for personal reasons. Finally, the U.S. also came to replace Dan Langhi fellow Elisma Edner, because this did not meet the expectations that he had. However, in the round of finals in the absence of a natural Pivot, American Larry Abney was activated to replace Daimon Gonner Alero, although the latter remained with the team as it would have required re-enable it. Finally, the Antiguan Lennox Mc Coy was activated after injury Base Puerto Rican Carlos Rivera in the semifinals. The injured Rivera also took the team from the stands to support it for the rest of the postseason.

===== LNBP Runner-up =====
At the end of the 2009-2010 regular season, the RedHawks were able for the first time ever the Super General Leadership with a record of 32 wins and 8 lost. In the first round of the play-off (Final Round), the RedHawks defeated the Hurricane Tampico by 3 wins to 1. Already in the round of the quarterfinals, the locals defeated the Panthers swept Aguascalientes 3 wins to 0. In the round of finals, the RedHawks defeated the Toros de Nuevo Laredo 4 wins to 2, thus achieving arriving for the first time in its history to the end of the LNBP. In the LNBP Final Series, the RedHawks fell 4-1 to the Falcons UV Xalapa, thereby achieving the runner-up.

==== 2010-11 ====
For the 2010-2011 season, returned 11 players of the 19 who participated last season, which were: Oscar "El Diablo" Castellanos (Team Captain), Hector "El Raton" Nungaray, Miguel Ayala, Raul Navarro, Joel Reynoso Edward Ayileke, the Veracruz Sunday Montalvo. As Americans Lawrence Hill, Jeff Aubry, and Puerto Ricans Carlos Rivera and Ricky Sanchez. Six new players were added: Arim Solares (Sourced from the Falcons UV Córdoba), Fernando Benitez (Youth from the ITESM), Juan Alvarez (Youth from UDLAP) Puerto Ricans Roberto Nieves (Sourced from the Santurce Crabbers) and Carmelo Lee (Sourced from Bayamón Cowboys, and for the American league took place), plus U.S. Richard Roby (Coming from Maccabi Haifa BC). Puerto Rican coach Eddie Casiano Jarocho took over the team, while Manolo Cintron fulfilled its commitment in front of the basketball team of Puerto Rico in the World Turquía. Cintron, like Ricky Sanchez and Carmelo Lee Buenos Aires have joined the team at the end of their participation in that justa. To make room on the Roster to the Puerto Rican Ricky Sanchez and Carmelo Lee, were discharged his compatriot Roberto Nieves and American Richard Roby, although the latter was training on the computer as it would have had the need to activate it again for some injury or absence of any of the other foreign players in the squad. However, due to the poor performance of the team in the first 8 days, and his low performance were I discharged Puerto Rican Ricky Sanchez and Edward Ayileke, replaced by the Panamanian Jaime Lloreda (Sourced from Marine Anzoategui) and Mexican -American David Crouse (Sourced from the Soles de Mexicali). Finally, Alejandro Pérez Zarco (Sourced from the Lechugueros Leon) joined the team in early December when he finished his college career, being at that time, a Roster of 16 players. However, due to its low performance were discharged U.S. Carmelo Lee and the Mexican -American David Crouse, replaced by U.S. Alero Brandon Robinson (Coming from the Liaoning Dinosaurs of China) and the Mexican -American Base Paul Stoll (Sourced Algodoneros of the Shire). On the other hand, Raul Navarro caused low as to not get him in game plans, finally leaving a Roster of 15 players. At the end of the regular season of the 2010-2011 season, the Red Hawks were fourth in the General Table with record 25 won and 11 lost. I getting to be the best defense in the tournament only accepting 2468 points in 36 games played, for an average of 68.56 points per game. Also managed to be the best team at home to mark livestock and 3 perdidos.6 15 In the first round of the play-off, the RedHawks defeated the Gray Wolves by tense UAD 0.7 3 wins in the second round of the playoffs, the RedHawks fell to 2 to 3 wins UV Xalapa Falcons.

==== 2011-12 ====
For the 2011-2012 season, repeated 7 players of the 15 who finished the previous season, which were: Hector " El Raton " Nungaray, Miguel Ayala, Joel Reynoso, Arim Solares, Fernando Benitez, as well as the Mexican -American Paul Stoll and Carlos Rivera (New team Captain). Seven new players were added: Noah Alonzo (Sourced from UV Xalapa Falcons), Isaac Gutierrez (Sourced from Panthers Aguascalientes, and strengthened the team in the 2010-11 LDA), Hugo Carrillo (Sourced from the Colts ITSON Obregón, and strengthened the team in 2010-11 LDA), Puerto Ricans David Cortés (Sourced from Arecibo Captains) and Ramon Clemente (Sourced from Indios de Mayagüez, which took place for the American league), besides the Americans Shaun Pruitt (Sourced from Guaynabo Mets) A.J. Valles (Los Angeles, CA) and Venezuelan Gregory Vargas (Sourced from Marine Anzoategui). However, because I had a Ramon Clemente prior commitment to a club in Israel, Venezuelan Luis Bethelmy (Sourced from Caracas Crocodiles) came to sustituirlo. also American Jeff Aubry (Sourced from Arecibo Captains, and returned to the club for the third time) joined the team in place of fellow Shaun Pruitt. For this campaign, the Puerto Rican coach Eddie Casiano was hired to lead the Veracruz quintet definitively, which took over the Jarocho team temporarily last season, while Manolo Cintron fulfilled its commitment in front of the basketball team of Puerto Rico in World Turquía. The Red Hawks placed first in the overall standings with 34 games won mark for only 6 losses, for a total of 74 points. addition were the better team as a local with record 19-1 win–loss record, 36 and also the best visitor with 15 wins and just 5 losses. They were also the best defense of the circuit to accept only 2745 points, for an average of 68.62 per game. Note that since coming to Mexican professional basketball, Veracruz Red Hawks had not had as good numbers as in this campaign. His best season was 2009-2010 when the also finished in first place overall and reached the final with Manolo Cintron ahead. On that occasion, the Buenos Aires quintet finished with 32 wins by 8 losses. Of those eight, lost two at home and the other visit. Now, with the same number of matches and directed by Eddie Casiano in his first foray into the Mexican basketball, Jarocho team reached the 34 wins for only 6 losses, and these home around Soles de Mexicali was the win. In addition only one team could make more than 100 points (Pioneers of Quintana Roo) and several of them left in less than 70 units against. In the round of the quarterfinals in the Play-offs, the Reds defeated the Barreteros de Zacatecas by 4 wins to 0, and thus gained their place in the round of 41 Semifinales. In phase Semifinal RedHawks faced the Pioneros de Quintana Roo, whom they defeated by tense 4 wins 0, achieving in this way to reach his second final in their history within the LNBP. On Monday February 13, 2012, the Veracruz Red Hawks ended a great season to get the LNBP championship for the first time in its history, defeating the Final Series to the Toros de Nuevo Laredo 4 wins to 1, the crowning jarocho team as a visitor in the Multidisciplinary Gymnasium Nuevo Laredo Nuevo Laredo, Tamaulipas own.

==== 2012-13 ====
For the 2012-2013 season, returned 9 players from the 14 team that was champion last season, which were: Noah Alonzo (New Team Captain), Arim Solares, Fernando Benitez, Hugo Carrillo, Isaac Gutierrez, Joel Reynoso; and Carlos Rivera Puerto Rican, Venezuelan Luis Bethelmy and American Jeff Aubry. Besides the coach Eddie Casiano continuity. Six new players were added: Elvis Medina (Coming of the Hurricane Tampico), Francisco Cruz (Sourced from Guinda Nogales Force), naturalized Mexican Americans Leroy Davis (Hurricanes from Tampico) and Mike Mitchell (Sourced from the Fuerza Regia Monterrey), in addition to Mexican Americans Karim Rodriguez and Marco Ramos (recruited from the tryouts held in Los Angeles). To cover the withdrawal of the injured Carlos Rivera Puerto Rican compatriot Filiberto Rivera joined the team from the Pipers of Zulia Venezuela. the other hand, to cover the temporary absence of the Venezuelan Luis Bethelmy, Panamanian Danilo Pinnock joined the Uniceub club from BRB Brasil. Moreover, before the departure of previous commitments by Filiberto Rivera arrival at jarocho team, the U.S. came to replace Curtis Stinson from the Cedevita Zagreb Croacia. Finally Venezuelan Luis Bethelmy is rejoined the team to cover the U.S. out injured Jeff Aubry. Both the Puerto Rican Carlos Rivera as American Jeff Aubry continued the Veracruz team until the end of the season, providing a possible injury of foreign players in the postseason. The RedHawks finished in second place in the overall standings with 32 games won mark for only 8 missing, for a total of 72 points. addition were the third best team as a local with record 17-3 win–loss record, 60 and the second best away with 15 wins and just 5 losses. For the third consecutive season were the best defensive circuit to accept only 2968 points, for an average of 74.20 per game.

==== 2013-14 ====
For the current 2013-2014 season, repeated 6 players of the 17 who finished the previous season, which are: Fernando Benitez, Hugo Carrillo, Isaac Gutierrez, Francisco Cruz, Marco Ramos and Carlos Rivera (Team Captain). Besides the coach Eddie Casiano continuity. Nine new players joined: Brandon Heredia (Sourced from the Roadrunners UAT Victoria), Jorge Casillas (Sourced from Panthers Aguascalientes, and strengthened the team in the 2010 LDA -11), Jesus Gonzalez (Sourced from the Hurricane Tampico), Puerto Ricans Filiberto Rivera (Sourced from the Chiefs of Humacao, and participate with the team last season) and David Huertas (Sourced from Panthers Aguascalientes), the Dominican Edward Santana (Sourced from the Pipers Zulia), in addition to Mexican-Americans Adrian Zamora (Sourced from the Hurricane Tampico), Salvador Cuevas (Sourced from the Barreteros Zacatecas) and Javier Ramos (Recruited from the tryouts held in Los Angeles). subsequently naturalized Mexican American Mike Mitchell, who last year dressed the Red Hawks jersey Veracruz, returned to the team for this season. Also caused low Javier Ramos, Brandon Heredia and Salvador Cuevas. Before the Puerto Rican out injured David Huertas, American James Maye (Coming Titans Licey) joined team to cover that square extranjero. Moreover, youth Joshua Ruiz (Coming UDLAP) joined the team. on the other hand, the U.S. Leroy Hickerson (Sourced from the Falcons UV Xalapa) joined the team, replacing compatriot James Maye, who was terminated for failing to meet expectations club.70 Finally, the Mexican -American Brody Angley (Sourced from the Toros de Nuevo Laredo) joined the team in replacing Mike Mitchell. Notably after the abandonment of the Dominican Edward Santana, Puerto Rican Renaldo Balkman (Coming Warlock of Guayama) came to fill that space foráneo. Finally, due to injury Filiberto Rivera and some administrative complications in processing naturalization of Carlos Rivera, the club's board announced the highest this último. Just as the reinstatement of Mike Mitchell instead of Joshua Ruiz, leaving a staff of 13 players again. At the end of the season, the RedHawks were in first place in the overall standings with 33 games won mark for only 7 lost, for a total of 73 puntos. addition were the better team as a local with record 19-1 win–loss record, 78 and also the best visitor with 14 wins and only 6 losses. For the fourth consecutive season were the best defensive circuit to accept only 3029 points, for an average of 75.73 per game.

== Current roster ==
Note: Flags indicate national team eligibility at FIBA-sanctioned events. Players may hold other non-FIBA nationalities not displayed.

Halcones Rojos Veracruz roster
Players
Coaches

Pos.	No.	Nat.	Name	Ht.	Age
SG	0	(Puerto Rico)	Ayala, Eric	1.96 m (6 ft 5 in)	27 – 2 January 1999
SG	3	(United States)	Dougherty, Colin	1.93 m (6 ft 4 in)	30 – 19 July 1996
PF	5	(United States)	Minnie, Elijah	2.06 m (6 ft 9 in)	32 – 4 August 1994
SF	8	(Mexico)	Ávalos, Irwin	2.01 m (6 ft 7 in)	35 – 13 June 1991
PG	11	(Mexico)	Suárez, Ramsés	1.73 m (5 ft 8 in)	33 – 3 November 1992
SF	12	(United States)	Blackmon, Marshawn	1.96 m (6 ft 5 in)	29 – 14 June 1997
C	17	(Mexico)	Reyna, Alejandro	2.06 m (6 ft 9 in)	29 – 17 February 1997
PG	21	(Puerto Rico)	Gandia-Rosa, Iván	1.84 m (6 ft 0 in)	31 – 14 September 1994
SG	29	(Mexico)	Colosia, Jordan
PF	30	(United States)	Horton, Ken	2.01 m (6 ft 7 in)	37 – 25 July 1989
PF	41	(United States)	Jefferson, Davon	2.03 m (6 ft 8 in)	39 – 3 November 1986
SG	42	(United States)	Washington, Deshawndre	2.01 m (6 ft 7 in)	25 – 23 February 2001
SG	44	(Mexico)	Andriassi, Josué	1.86 m (6 ft 1 in)	28 – 12 October 1997

Head coach

- (Puerto Rico) Carlos Rivera

Assistant coach(es)

- (Argentina) Ariel Rearte

Legend

- (C) Team captain
- Injured

- Roster
Updated: 24 July 2022

== Retired numbers ==
Númber	Player	Nationality
4	Oscar "Diablo" Castellanos	Mexican

== Other notable former players ==
- (Mexico) Noe Alonzo
- (Mexico) Israel Gutiérrez
- (Puerto Rico) Jeffrion Aubry
- (United States) Tu Holloway
