= Instituto Viver Basquetebol =

Lobos Brasília
- Founded: 2000; 26 years ago
- Folded: 2017; 9 years ago
- Arena: Ginásio Nilson Nelson (capacity: 16,000); Ginásio da ASCEB (capacity: 3,050)
- Location: Brasília, Brazil
- Team colors: White, Blue, Red
- Championships: 1 FIBA Americas League; 3 FIBA South American Leagues; 4 Brazilian Championships
Home	Away

The Instituto Viver Basquetebol, commonly known simply as Lobos Brasília, was a Brazilian professional basketball club, based in Brasília, Federal District. The team was founded in 2000, and renamed in 2009, been originally related to Salgado de Oliveira University (UNIVERSO). Between 2010 and 2017 was associated with Centro Universitário de Brasília (UniCEUB) and named UniCEUB/BRB/Brasília. Their gyms are Nilson Nelson and ASCEB (minor games). In 2017, the team was dissolved.

The lack of soccer tradition in Brasília contributed to the basketball team of UniCEUB/BRB being adopted as a local passion. The results inside the basketball court also favored the club consolidation, especially the third consecutive championship of Novo Basquete Brasil (NBB) won in 2011–2012 season, that led the team to reach the mark of four national titles in six consecutive finals.

In addition, UniCEUB/BRB was the first Brazilian team to have won the FIBA Americas League, the most important club tournament of the International Basketball Federation (FIBA) in the continent. In 2008–09 season the team won the title by defeating the Mexican Halcones Xalapa in their home.

== History ==
=== 2000–06: Creation and consolidation ===
The history of Instituto Viver Basquetebol (Living Basketball Institute) began in 2000 when University Salgado de Oliveira created in Brasilia its basketball team. Since its first year, the team came to dominate the local scene of the Federal District, with the conquest of Metropolitan Basketball Championships, but in 2003, from the investment of a weight sponsor as the BRB Bank, the team appeared for the first time on the national scene. That season, the so-called Universo/BRB/Brasília won the Brazilian Basketball Supercup with a team of athletes with experience in the Brazilian National Team, such as Ratto, Alexey Carvalho, and Sandro Varejao.

From the entrance of a larger capital, the return came naturally. With the title of the 2003 Supercup, the team earned a place in the 2004 Brazilian Basketball Championship. Maintained the previous year's players, the team won the 2004 Supercup, ensuring the presence for the second consecutive year in the national main competition.

With the continuity of work, the team, led at the time by José Roberto Lux, reached the 4th position in the 2005 Brazilian Basketball Championship. The following year, the team was put together to finally win the national title, but the outcome of the season generated controversy. Officially, the Brazilian Championship 2006 has not even ended because the team from Brasilia filed an injunction in court claiming that one player from the Telemar Rio de Janeiro was playing irregularly hexagonal, which defined the finalists.

=== 2007–12: National hegemony ===
The year of 2007 marked the beginning of the so-called Golden Age of Brasilia, which would reach six consecutive national finals to win four Brazilian Championships, in addition to the trophies of the South American Basketball League and the League of the Americas. The team's greatest run was possible thanks to the arrival of a group of former players COC/Ribeirao Preto, such as Nezinho, Alex Garcia, Arthur, Márcio Cipriano and Alirio.

In 2007, after an unbeaten run of 20 games, Brasilia obtained the national basketball attendance record in a match against Flamengo, with 24,286 people attending in the Nilson Nelson Gymnasium. And in the final of the Championship that year, led by José Carlos Vidal, they won the national title over the traditional team of Franca. After the title, Alex Garcia left for a new international team in Israel. Nezinho also left the team, going to Limeira.

In the 2008 season, to replace the outgoing Nezinho and Alex, they were hired Valtinho and Maurice Spillers. The team was again led by Lula Ferreira and was runner-up in the Brazilian Championship, losing the final to Flamengo by 3–0.

Alex Garcia returned to Brasilia in 2009, but the team was once again the Brazilian runner-up, this time in the first edition of the Brazilian New Basketball (NBB), losing the final to Flamengo by the score of 3–2. However, they won the first international title of the group, becoming champion of the League of the Americas, winning the Finals played in Xalapa, Mexico against the home team, Halcones de Xalapa.

Determined to recover the highest position of Brazilian basketball, Universo/Brasília rehired Nezinho and repatriated Guilherme Giovannoni in 2010. The team then returned to clinch the National Champion winning the "Carioca Club" by 3–2 in the final of NBB2.

In the next season, the team had to be sheltered by the University Center of Brasilia (UniCEUB). Political disagreements led the Universo to exchange Brasilia for the city of Uberlândia. With the change, they left Valtinho and Estevam, who were defending the colors of the new team, while the coach Lula Ferreira was replaced by Jose Carlos Vidal.

The group moved, changing the blue and white colors of Universo to the red and white of UniCEUB, and won the NBB3 again over Franca in the final, and the South American League over Flamengo in Rio de Janeiro. In 2012, the team reached its fourth national title in the final in a single game against São José.

=== 2013–16: Cycle end and renewal ===
After six seasons of linked successes, the 2012–13 season was the first without titles for the team. The team was eliminated in the quarter-finals of NBB5 by São José losing the series by 3–2 with a painful defeat in the fifth game in full Nilson Nelson. Vidal was no longer coach and the team signed Sergio Hernandez, triple winner of the Argentinian Championship of the seasons 2009–10, 2010–11 and 2011–12 with Peñarol de Mar del Plata, to be the new coach.

With Hernandez at charge, the team was champion of his second South American League, but it was not beyond the quarter-finals in NBB6, falling again facing São José, for 3–0. At the end of the season, Alex and Nezinho left the team, ending his victorious trajectories in the national capital. To reset the positions, the UniCEUB/ BRB/Brasilia announced the signing of experienced Fulvio for the 2014–15 season. Again under the instructions of Carlos Vidal, the team returned to be eliminated in the quarter-end of the NBB, this time losing to Limeira.

For the 2015–16 season, the Uniceub/BRB/Brasilia maintained the base of the previous year and invested in hiring young promises of Brazilian basketball, such as Deryk Ramos and Jefferson Campos. With a more balanced bench, allowing greater rotation during the games, the team won its third South American League, becoming the biggest winner of the competition, alongside Atenas de Córdoba (ARG). At NBB, however, the team returned to stay out of the decision, to be eliminated by Bauru in the semi-finals.

Continuing the renewal of the cast, the Uniceub/BRB/Brasilia hired two promising young pivots for the season 2016–17: Lucas Mariano, with games for the Brazilian National Team, and Fab Melo, with experience in the NBA.

=== 2017–: Financial troubles and debts ===
After the 2016–17 season, the team lost its main sponsor UniCEUB after finishing the NBB in 8th place (lost to Bauru in the quarterfinals play-offs). In financial debt with players and coaching staff, the team gave up participating in the 2017–18 season.

== Honors and titles ==
=== Latin America ===
- FIBA Americas League
  - Champions (1): 2008–09

=== Continental ===
- FIBA South American League
  - Champions (3): 2010, 2013, 2015
  - Runners-up (1): 2012

=== National ===
- Brazilian Championship
  - Champions (4): 2007, 2009–10, 2010–11, 2011–12
  - Runners-up (2): 2008, 2008–09
- Brazilian Super Cup
  - Winners (2): 2003, 2004

=== Regional ===
- Brasiliense Championship
  - Champions (11): 2002, 2003, 2004, 2005, 2006, 2007, 2008, 2009, 2010, 2013, 2015, 2016
  - Runners-up (2): 2013, 2014

== Final roster ==
Note: Flags indicate national team eligibility at FIBA-sanctioned events. Players may hold other non-FIBA nationalities not displayed.

Brasília roster
Players
Coaches

Pos.	No.	Nat.	Name	Ht.	Wt.	Age
G	1	(Brazil)	Ferreira da Silva, Pedro	1.96 m (6 ft 5 in)		31 – 2 January 1995
G/F	3	(Brazil)	Campos, Jefferson	1.85 m (6 ft 1 in)		34 – 9 February 1991
F/C	5	(Brazil)	Pilar, Henrique	1.98 m (6 ft 6 in)		41 – 14 February 1984
F	7	(Brazil)	Lourenço, Paulo	1.93 m (6 ft 4 in)		31 – 13 October 1994
G	8	(Brazil)	Silveira, Victor	1.83 m (6 ft 0 in)		30 – 5 June 1995
G/F	9	(Brazil)	Ramos, Deryk	1.85 m (6 ft 1 in)		31 – 14 June 1994
F	10	(Brazil)	Oliveira, Alex	1.94 m (6 ft 4 in)		42 – 17 August 1983
G	11	(Brazil)	de Assis, Fúlvio	1.86 m (6 ft 1 in)		44 – 15 August 1981
F/C	12	(Brazil)	Giovannoni, Guilherme (C)	2.04 m (6 ft 8 in)		45 – 2 June 1980
F	14	(Brazil)	Lima, Johnny	1.96 m (6 ft 5 in)		29 – 18 February 1996
F/C	15	(Brazil)	Bernardi, João	1.98 m (6 ft 6 in)		35 – 8 June 1990
C	16	(Brazil)	Alemão, Daniel	2.02 m (6 ft 8 in)		42 – 14 December 1983
C	28	(Brazil)	Mariano, Lucas	2.07 m (6 ft 9 in)		32 – 24 September 1993
C	32	(Brazil)	Araújo, Iago	2.06 m (6 ft 9 in)		30 – 16 March 1995
C	33	(Brazil)	Costa, Rômulo	2.05 m (6 ft 9 in)		30 – 1 October 1995
F	55	(Brazil)	Santos, Kelvin	1.80 m (5 ft 11 in)		30 – 10 December 1995

Head coach

- (Brazil) Bruno Savignani

Assistant coach(es)

- (Brazil) Paulo Santiago
- (Brazil) Brenno Blassioli

Legend

- (C) Team captain
- Injured

- Roster
Updated: 2017-02-12

=== Notable players ===
Note: Flags indicate national team eligibility at FIBA-sanctioned events. Players may hold other non-FIBA nationalities not displayed.

Criteria

To appear in this section a player must have either:

- Set a club record or won an individual award while at the club
- Played at least one official international match for their national team at any time
- Played at least one official NBA match at any time.

- (Brazil) Alexey Carvalho
- (Brazil) Lucas Cipolini
- (Brazil) Valtinho da Silva
- (Brazil) Nezinho dos Santos
- (Brazil) Alex Garcia
- (Brazil) Duda Machado
- (Brazil) Fab Melo
- (Brazil) Diego Pinheiro
- (Brazil) Pipoka
- (Brazil) Paulão Prestes
- (Brazil) Deryk Ramos
- (Brazil) Ratto
- (Brazil) Arthur Belchor Silva
- (Brazil) Jefferson Sobral
- (Brazil) Sandro Varejão
- (Uruguay) Martín Osimani
- (Dominican Republic) José "El Grillo" Vargas
- (United States) Kenya Capers
- (United States) Maurice Spillers

== Franchise accomplishments and awards ==
=== Franchise leaders ===
Single Game Records (Regular Season)
Category	Player	Statistics	Date
Points	Nezinho dos Santos	40	February 26, 2013
Minutes played	–	–	–
Rebounds	Ronald Reis	20	January 18, 2014
Assists	Nezinho dos Santos	18	February 7, 2010
Steals	Válter da Silva; Nezinho dos Santos; Jefferson Campos	6	January 15, 2010; December 10, 2010; December 22, 2015
Blocks	Ronald Reis	5	March 21, 2015
Field goals made	–	–	–
3-Point Field Goals	Nezinho dos Santos	8	February 26, 2013
Free throws	Válter da Silva	17	March 15, 2009
Turnovers	–	–	–

Single Game Records (Playoffs)
Category	Player	Statistics	Date
Points	Guilherme Giovannoni; Nezinho dos Santos	36	May 6, 2011; May 3, 2013
Minutes played	–	–	–
Rebounds	Paulão Prestes; Ronald Reis	14	May 1, 2013; May 10, 2016
Assists	Fúlvio de Assis	13	May 10, 2016
Steals	Nezinho dos Santos	6	May 6, 2011
Blocks	Alex Garcia	4	May 7, 2010
Field goals made	–	–	–
3-Point Field Goals	Nezinho dos Santos	8	May 3, 2013
Free throws	Alex Garcia	16	May 22, 2011
Turnovers	–	–	–
