= 2017 FIBA AmeriCup squads =

The following are the squads for 2017 FIBA AmeriCup.

Ages and clubs are as of the opening day of the tournament on 25 August 2017.

== Group A ==
=== Brazil ===
Brazil men's national basketball team – 2017 FIBA AmeriCup roster
Players
Coaches

Pos.	No.	Name	Age – Date of birth	Height	Club	Ctr.
PG	4	Davi Rossetto	25 – 27 July 1992	1.85 m (6 ft 1 in)	Cearense	(Brazil)
SF	5	Bruno Caboclo	21 – 21 September 1995	2.02 m (6 ft 8 in)	Toronto Raptors	(Canada)
SF	7	Lucas Dias	21 – 21 September 1995	2.07 m (6 ft 9 in)	Paulistano	(Brazil)
PF	8	Lucas Mariano	23 – 24 September 1993	2.07 m (6 ft 9 in)	Brasília	(Brazil)
SG	9	Danilo Siqueira	23 – 10 January 1994	1.89 m (6 ft 2 in)	Minas	(Brazil)
C	10	Renan Lenz	26 – 10 September 1990	2.07 m (6 ft 9 in)	Bauru	(Brazil)
PG	11	Fúlvio de Assis	36 – 15 August 1981	1.86 m (6 ft 1 in)	Vasco da Gama	(Brazil)
C	12	Rafael Mineiro	29 – 3 June 1988	2.06 m (6 ft 9 in)	Franca	(Brazil)
C	13	João Paulo Batista	35 – 29 October 1981	2.06 m (6 ft 9 in)	Flamengo	(Brazil)
SF	14	Leonardo Meindl	27 – 23 March 1990	2.00 m (6 ft 7 in)	Franca	(Brazil)
SG	18	Jimmy Oliviera	27 – 11 April 1990	1.90 m (6 ft 3 in)	Mogi das Cruzes	(Brazil)
PG	32	Georginho de Paula	21 – 24 May 1996	1.92 m (6 ft 4 in)	Paulistano	(Brazil)

Head coach

- (Brazil) César Guidetti

Assistant coach(es)

- (Brazil) Felipe Luiz Santana

Legend

- Club – describes last
  club before the tournament
- Age – describes age
  on August 25, 2017

=== Colombia ===
Colombia men's national basketball team – 2017 FIBA AmeriCup roster
Players
Coaches

Pos.	No.	Name	Age – Date of birth	Height	Club	Ctr.
PG	4	Edgar Moreno	35 – 30 August 1981	1.90 m (6 ft 3 in)	Cimarrones del Choco	(Colombia)
SF	7	Luis Almanza	26 – 20 August 1991	1.96 m (6 ft 5 in)	Condores	(Colombia)
F	8	Michaell Jackson	30 – 11 July 1987	1.91 m (6 ft 3 in)	Coopeservidores Escazu	(Costa Rica)
SF	9	Stalin Ortiz	36 – 8 February 1981	1.91 m (6 ft 3 in)	Fast Break (basketball club)	(Colombia)
G	10	Hansel Atencia	20 – 24 May 1997	1.78 m (5 ft 10 in)	Master's Mustangs	(United States)
SG	11	Braian Angola-Rodas	23 – 6 April 1994	1.98 m (6 ft 6 in)	Florida State Seminoles	(United States)
PF	12	Divier Perez	28 – 14 April 1989	2.03 m (6 ft 8 in)	Academia de la Montana	(Colombia)
C	14	John Hernandez	33 – 6 January 1984	2.13 m (7 ft 0 in)	Cimarrones del Choco	(Colombia)
F	15	Jhan Mejia	23 – 15 June 1994	2.06 m (6 ft 9 in)	Cal State Fullerton Titans	(United States)
PF	20	Tonny Trocha-Morelos	23 – 21 June 1994	2.06 m (6 ft 9 in)	Texas A&M Aggies	(United States)
C	22	Hanner Mosquera-Perea	24 – 28 January 1993	2.06 m (6 ft 9 in)	East Tennessee State Buccaneers	(United States)
C	23	Juan Palacios	32 – 11 May 1985	2.05 m (6 ft 9 in)	BC Neptūnas	(Lithuania)

Head coach

- (Colombia) Guillermo Moreno

Assistant coach(es)

- (Colombia) Tomas Diaz

Legend

- Club – describes last
  club before the tournament
- Age – describes age
  on August 25, 2017

=== Mexico ===
Mexico men's national basketball team – 2017 FIBA AmeriCup roster
Players
Coaches

Pos.	No.	Name	Age – Date of birth	Height	Club	Ctr.
G	4	Diego Willis	18 – 11 May 1999	1.94 m (6 ft 4 in)	Tenerife Academy	(Spain)
PF	5	Irwin Ávalos	26 – 12 June 1991	2.01 m (6 ft 7 in)	Santos de San Luis	(Mexico)
PG	6	Idris Dawud	26 – 12 June 1991	1.93 m (6 ft 4 in)	Centauros	(Mexico)
PG	7	Jorge Gutiérrez	28 – 27 December 1988	1.91 m (6 ft 3 in)	Trento	(Italy)
F/C	8	Edgar Garibay	27 – 5 March 1990	2.11 m (6 ft 11 in)	Guaiqueríes	(Venezuela)
SG	9	Francisco Cruz	27 – 3 October 1989	1.91 m (6 ft 3 in)	Fuenlabrada	(Spain)
PG	10	Gabriel Girón	29 – 27 February 1988	1.90 m (6 ft 3 in)	Fuerza Regia	(Mexico)
G	11	Alex Pérez	24 – 1 January 1993	1.92 m (6 ft 4 in)	BK VEF Rīga	(Latvia)
PF	12	Héctor Hernández	30 – 15 June 1985	2.05 m (6 ft 9 in)	Free Agent
C	13	Fernando Benítez	28 – 6 August 1989	2.04 m (6 ft 8 in)	Panteras	(Mexico)
C	14	Lorenzo Mata	31 – 27 February 1986	2.06 m (6 ft 9 in)	Toros	(Mexico)
C	15	Israel Gutiérrez	24 – 15 January 1993	2.06 m (6 ft 9 in)	Argentino de Junín	(Argentina)

Head coach

- (Spain) Sergio Valdeolmillos

Assistant coach(es)

- (Spain) Ramón Diaz
- (Mexico) Javier Ceniceros
- (Mexico) Mateo Rubio

Legend

- Club – describes current
  or most recent club
- Age – describes age
  on August 25, 2017

=== Puerto Rico ===
Puerto Rico men's national basketball team – 2017 FIBA AmeriCup roster
Players
Coaches

Pos.	No.	Name	Age – Date of birth	Height	Club	Ctr.
PG	1	Alex Abreu	26 – August 14, 1991	5 ft 11 in (1.8 m)	Orléans Loiret Basket	(France)
SG	3	Mike Rosario	26 – November 2, 1990	6 ft 3 in (1.91 m)	Piratas de Quebradillas	(Puerto Rico)
PF	5	Ramón Rivas Jr.	22 – October 11, 1994	6 ft 8 in (2.03 m)	North Georgia Nighthawks	(United States)
F	6	Chris Ortiz	24 – April 2, 1993	6 ft 8 in (2.03 m)	Cariduros de Fajardo	(Puerto Rico)
PF	11	Carlos López	27 – June 23, 1990	6 ft 10 in (2.08 m)	Atléticos de San Germán	(Puerto Rico)
C	12	Jorge Bryan Díaz	27 – November 13, 1989	6 ft 11 in (2.11 m)	Piratas de Quebradillas	(Puerto Rico)
PG	13	Ángel Rodríguez	24 – December 5, 1992	5 ft 11 in (1.8 m)	Maccabi Haifa	(Israel)
SF	14	Gilberto Clavell	28 – August 10, 1989	6 ft 6 in (1.98 m)	Santeros de Aguada	(Puerto Rico)
F	22	Emmanuel Andújar	24 – June 27, 1993	6 ft 6 in (1.98 m)	Santeros de Aguada	(Puerto Rico)
PG	31	Carlos Rivera (C)	34 – February 5, 1983	6 ft 2 in (1.88 m)	Leones de Ponce	(Puerto Rico)
PF	33	Chris Gastón	28 – April 20, 1989	6 ft 7 in (2.01 m)	Santeros de Aguada	(Puerto Rico)
C	34	Tyler Davis	20 – May 22, 1997	6 ft 10 in (2.08 m)	Texas A&M Aggies	(United States)

Head coach

- (Puerto Rico) Eddie Casiano

Assistant coach(es)

- (Puerto Rico) Manolo Cintrón
- (Puerto Rico) Omar Gonzalez

Legend

- (C) Team captain
- Club field describes current
  or most recent club
- Age – describes age
  on August 25, 2017

== Group B ==
=== Argentina ===
Argentina men's basketball team roster – 2017 FIBA AmeriCup roster
Players
Coaches

Pos.	No.	Name	Age – Date of birth	Height	Club	Ctr.
PG		Luca Vildoza	22 – 11 August 1995	1.91 m (6 ft 3 in)	Baskonia	(Spain)
SG		Lucio Redivo	23 – 14 February 1994	1.83 m (6 ft 0 in)	Bilbao Basket	(Spain)
PF		Luis Scola (C)	37 – 30 April 1980	2.06 m (6 ft 9 in)	Shanxi Brave Dragons	(China)
PG		Facundo Campazzo	26 – 23 March 1991	1.80 m (5 ft 11 in)	Real Madrid	(Spain)
PG		Nicolás Laprovíttola	27 – 31 January 1990	1.90 m (6 ft 3 in)	Zenit St. Petersburg	(Russia)
SG		Nicolás Brussino	24 – 2 March 1993	2.03 m (6 ft 8 in)	Atlanta Hawks	(United States)
C		Marcos Delía	25 – 8 April 1992	2.10 m (6 ft 11 in)	CB Murcia	(Spain)
C		Tayavek Gallizzi	24 – 8 February 1993	2.06 m (6 ft 9 in)	Club La Unión	(Argentina)
SF		Gabriel Deck	22 – 8 February 1995	2.01 m (6 ft 7 in)	San Lorenzo	(Argentina)
G/F		Patricio Garino	24 – 17 May 1993	2.01 m (6 ft 7 in)	Saski Baskonia	(Spain)
PF		Javier Saiz	23 – 16 February 1994	2.06 m (6 ft 9 in)	Regatas Corrientes	(Argentina)
G		Máximo Fjellerup	19 – 27 November 1997	1.97 m (6 ft 6 in)	Bahía Basket	(Argentina)

Head coach

- (Argentina) Sergio Hernández

Assistant coach(es)

- (Argentina) Nicolás Casalanguida
- (Argentina) Gonzalo García
- (Argentina) Silvio Santander

Legend

- (C) Team captain
- Club – describes current club
- Age – describes age
  on August 25, 2017

=== Canada ===
Canada men's national basketball team – 2017 FIBA AmeriCup roster
Players
Coaches

Pos.	No.	Name	Age – Date of birth	Height	Club	Ctr.
F		Richard Amardi	26 – October 16, 1990	6 ft 1 in (1.85 m)	Niagara River Lions	(Canada)
C		Joel Anthony	34 – August 9, 1982	6 ft 8 in (2.03 m)	Free Agent
G		Jermaine Anderson	34 – 8 February 1983	6 ft 2 in (1.88 m)	Free Agent
F		Murphy Burnatowski	26 – 18 July 1991	6 ft 7 in (2.01 m)	Fribourg Olympic	(Switzerland)
G		Junior Cadougan	27 – 7 May 1990	6 ft 1 in (1.85 m)	London Lightning	(Canada)
G		Ammanuel Diressa	24 – 5 May 1993	6 ft 5 in (1.96 m)	Ryerson Rams	(Canada)
F		Grandy Glaze	25 – 4 March 1992	6 ft 7 in (2.01 m)	Caballeros de Culiacán	(Mexico)
G		Olivier Hanlan	24 – 15 February 1993	6 ft 4 in (1.93 m)	Le Mans Sarthe Basket	(France)
G		Brady Heslip	27 – June 19, 1990	6 ft 1 in (1.85 m)	Trabzonspor B.K.	(Turkey)
F		Andrew Nicholson	27 – 8 December 1989	6 ft 9 in (2.06 m)	Portland Trail Blazers	(United States)
G/F		Dyshawn Pierre	23 – 17 November 1993	6 ft 6 in (1.98 m)	Dinamo Sassari	(Italy)
G		Xavier Rathan-Mayes	23 – 29 April 1994	6 ft 4 in (1.93 m)	New York Knicks	(United States)

Head coach

- (Canada) Roy Rana

Assistant coach(es)

- (Canada) Dave Smart
- (Canada) Scott Morrison
- (Canada) Nathaniel Mitchell

Legend

- (C) Team captain
- Club – describes last
  professional club
- Age – describes age
  on August 25, 2017

=== U.S. Virgin Islands ===
U.S. Virgin Islands men's national basketball team – 2017 FIBA AmeriCup roster
Players
Coaches

Pos.	No.	Name	Age – Date of birth	Height	Club	Ctr.
PG	4	Angel Rivera	22 – 17 March 1995	1.70 m (5 ft 7 in)	Stetson Hatters	(United States)
SG	5	Stephaun Adams	20 – 20 November 1996	1.93 m (6 ft 4 in)	Tennessee Tech Golden Eagles	(United States)
PG	6	Walter Hodge	30 – 21 September 1986	1.83 m (6 ft 0 in)	Capitanes de Arecibo	(Puerto Rico)
SF	7	Cuthbert Victor	34 – 30 January 1983	1.97 m (6 ft 6 in)	ET Land	(South Korea)
PF	8	Justin Gray	21 – 15 December 1995	2.00 m (6 ft 7 in)	Texas Tech Red Raiders	(United States)
SG	9	Jonathan Gray	26 – 4 May 1991	1.93 m (6 ft 4 in)	Valle d'Itria Basket Martina Franca	(Italy)
SG	10	Jahmia Simmons	19 – 17 June 1998	1.94 m (6 ft 4 in)	North Texas Mean Green	(United States)
SG	11	Deon Edwin	25 – 9 August 1992	1.93 m (6 ft 4 in)	KTP Basket	(Finland)
SF	12	Khalid Hart	22 – 13 September 1994	1.92 m (6 ft 4 in)	Marist Red Foxes	(United States)
SF	13	Rashawn Fredericks	20 – 12 November 1996	1.95 m (6 ft 5 in)	Motlow State Bucks	(United States)
C	14	Phillip Jones	31 – 2 September 1985	2.11 m (6 ft 11 in)	Atléticos de San Germán	(Puerto Rico)
PF	15	Javier Martínez	24 – 16 July 1993	1.98 m (6 ft 6 in)	Tennessee-Martin Skyhawks	(United States)

Head coach

- (United States) Sam Mitchell

Assistant coach(es)

- (United States) Jareem Dowling
- (United States) Michael Evans

Legend

- (C) Team captain
- Club – describes current club
- Age – describes age
  on August 25, 2017

=== Venezuela ===
Venezuela men's national basketball team – 2017 FIBA AmeriCup roster
Players
Coaches

Pos.	No.	Name	Age – Date of birth	Height	Club	Ctr.
PG		Gregory Vargas	31 – 18 February 1986	1.80 m (5 ft 11 in)	Montakit Fuenlabrada	(Spain)
SG		John Cox	36 – 7 June 1981	1.94 m (6 ft 4 in)	Medi bayreuth	(Germany)
PF		Miguel Ruiz	26 – 20 December 1990	2.02 m (6 ft 8 in)	Trotamundos de Carabobo	(Venezuela)
PG		Heissler Guillént	30 – 17 December 1986	1.86 m (6 ft 1 in)	Guaros de Lara	(Venezuela)
F		Anthony Pérez	23 – 29 September 1993	2.05 m (6 ft 9 in)	Trotamundos de Carabobo	(Venezuela)
PF		Néstor Colmenares	29 – 5 September 1987	2.03 m (6 ft 8 in)	Guaros de Lara	(Venezuela)
F/C		Windi Graterol	30 – 10 September 1986	2.05 m (6 ft 9 in)	Bucaneros de La Guaira	(Venezuela)
G/F		José Gregorio Vargas	35 – 23 January 1982	1.95 m (6 ft 5 in)	Guaros de Lara	(Venezuela)
F/C		José Bravo	31 – 16 May 1986	2.04 m (6 ft 8 in)	Bucaneros de La Guaira	(Venezuela)
C		Luis Carrillo	24 – 14 May 1993	2.06 m (6 ft 9 in)	Trotamundos de Carabobo	(Venezuela)
SG		César García	27 – 24 May 1990	1.93 m (6 ft 4 in)		(Venezuela)
G		Pedro Chourio	27 – 13 March 1990	1.86 m (6 ft 1 in)	Trotamundos de Carabobo	(Venezuela)

Head coach

- (Argentina) Néstor García

Assistant coach(es)

- (Venezuela) Nelson Solórzano
- (Venezuela) Daniel Seoane

Legend

- Club – describes last
  club before the tournament
- Age – describes age
  on August 25, 2017
- (C) – Team Captain

== Group C ==
=== Dominican Republic ===
Dominican Republic men's national basketball team – 2017 FIBA AmeriCup roster
Players
Coaches

Pos.	No.	Name	Age – Date of birth	Height	Club	Ctr.
SG		Víctor Liz	31 – 12 May 1986	1.82 m (6 ft 0 in)	Metros de Santiago	(Dominican Republic)
SG		Rigoberto Mendoza	? – 6 July 1992	1.90 m (6 ft 3 in)	Estudiantes Concordia	(Argentina)
PF		Edward Santana	? – 14 September 1987	2.03 m (6 ft 8 in)	Titanes del Distrito Nacional	(Dominican Republic)
PG		Juan Coronado	34 – 25 August 1983	1.85 m (6 ft 1 in)	Reales de La Vega	(Dominican Republic)
F		Angel Nunez	25 – 29 December 1991	2.03 m (6 ft 8 in)	Metros de Santiago	(Dominican Republic)
SF		Dagoberto Peña	29 – 14 June 1988	1.98 m (6 ft 6 in)	CB Estudiantes	(Spain)

Head coach

- (Dominican Republic) Melvyn López

Legend

- (C) Team captain
- Club field describes current pro club
- Age – describes age
  on August 25, 2017

=== Panama ===
Panama men's national basketball team – 2017 FIBA AmeriCup roster
Players
Coaches

Pos.	No.	Name	Age – Date of birth	Height	Club	Ctr.
G		Joel Muñoz	35 – 24 June 1980	1.78 m (5 ft 10 in)	Los Tigres de Villa Caceres	(Panama)
F		Tony Bishop	26 – 16 July 1989	2.01 m (6 ft 7 in)	Kanazawa Samuraiz	(Japan)
C		Jonathan King	26 – 25 January 1990	2.07 m (6 ft 9 in)	Sonsonate BC	(El Salvador)
PF		Josimar Ayarza	29 – 3 May 1987	2.05 m (6 ft 9 in)	Atlético Echagüe	(Argentina)
PG		Eugenio Luzcando	21 – 24 April 1995	1.87 m (6 ft 2 in)	Boston College Eagles	(United States)
SF		Ernesto Oglivie	26 – 30 June 1989	1.99 m (6 ft 6 in)	AD Isidro Metapan	(El Salvador)

Head coach

- (Spain) Joaquín Ruiz Lorente

Assistant coach(es)

- (Spain) Alberto Codeso
- (United States) Dionisio Gomez

Legend

- Club – describes last
  club before the tournament
- Age – describes age
  on August 25, 2017

=== United States ===
United States men's national basketball team – 2017 FIBA AmeriCup roster
Players
Coaches

Pos.	No.	Name	Age – Date of birth	Height	Club	Ctr.
G	5	Billy Baron	26 – December 11, 1990	6 ft 2 in (1.88 m)	Eskişehir	(Turkey)
C	15	Alec Brown	25 – July 23, 1992	7 ft 1 in (2.16 m)	Estudiantes	(Spain)
G	6	Larry II Drew	27 – March 5, 1990	6 ft 2 in (1.88 m)	Sioux Falls Skyforce	(United States)
G	10	Reggie Hearn	26 – August 14, 1991	6 ft 4 in (1.93 m)	Reno Bighorns	(United States)
F	12	Darrun Hilliard	24 – April 13, 1993	6 ft 6 in (1.98 m)	Detroit Pistons	(United States)
F	14	Jonathan Holmes	24 – December 9, 1992	6 ft 9 in (2.06 m)	Canton Charge	(United States)
G	4	Kendall Marshall	26 – August 19, 1991	6 ft 4 in (1.93 m)	Reno Bighorns	(United States)
G	9	Xavier Munford	25 – June 1, 1992	6 ft 3 in (1.91 m)	Greensboro Swarm	(United States)
C	11	Marshall Plumlee	25 – July 14, 1992	7 ft 0 in (2.13 m)	New York Knicks	(United States)
F	13	Jameel Warney	23 – January 31, 1994	6 ft 7 in (2.01 m)	Texas Legends	(United States)
G	8	C. J. Williams	27 – February 6, 1990	6 ft 5 in (1.96 m)	Texas Legends	(United States)
G/F	7	Reggie Williams	30 – September 14, 1986	6 ft 8 in (2.03 m)	Oklahoma City Blue	(United States)

Head coach

- (United States) Jeff Van Gundy

Assistant coach(es)

- (Georgia (country)) Tyrone Ellis
- (United States) Mo McHone

Legend

- Club – describes last
  club before the tournament
- Age – describes age
  on August 25, 2017

=== Uruguay ===
Uruguay men's national basketball team – 2017 FIBA AmeriCup roster
Players
Coaches

Pos.	No.	Name	Age – Date of birth	Height	Club	Ctr.
C	1	Gonzalo Iglesias	24 – 4 August 1993	2.04 m (6 ft 8 in)	Weber Bahia Blanca Basket	(Argentina)
PG	4	Mauro Zubiaurre	23 – 25 May 1994	1.84 m (6 ft 0 in)	Atenas	(Uruguay)
F	5	Juan Ducasse	18 – 2 September 1998	2.04 m (6 ft 8 in)	Sunrise Christian Academy	(United States)
PG	6	Bruno Fitipaldo	26 – 2 August 1991	1.84 m (6 ft 0 in)	Scandone Avellino	(Italy)
PF	11	Sebastian Izaguirre	31 – 4 December 1985	2.07 m (6 ft 9 in)	Hebraica y Macabi	(Uruguay)
PF	13	Sebastian Vazquez	31 – 4 September 1985	1.95 m (6 ft 5 in)	Goes Montevideo	(Uruguay)
F	14	Nicolas Borsellino	31 – 8 May 1986	2.02 m (6 ft 8 in)	Biguá	(Uruguay)
C	15	Esteban Batista	33 – 2 September 1983	2.08 m (6 ft 10 in)	Umana Reyer Venezia	(Italy)
G	21	Luciano Parodi	23 – 16 February 1994	1.82 m (6 ft 0 in)	Weber Bahia Blanca Basket	(Argentina)
G	25	Jayson Granger	27 – 15 September 1989	1.88 m (6 ft 2 in)	Baskonia	(Spain)
F	31	Hernando Caceres	23 – 22 August 1994	2.08 m (6 ft 10 in)	Club Trouville Montevideo	(Uruguay)
C	33	Kiril Wachsmann	32 – 12 November 1984	2.03 m (6 ft 8 in)	Defensor Sporting	(Uruguay)

Head coach

- (Uruguay) / (Italy) Marcelo Signorelli

Assistant coach(es)

- (Uruguay) Marcelo Capalbo
- (Uruguay) Javier Isis

Legend

- Club – describes last
  club before the tournament
- Age – describes age
  on August 25, 2017
