= 2022 FIBA AmeriCup squads =

The following are the squads for the 2022 FIBA AmeriCup.

Ages and clubs are as of the opening day of the tournament, 2 September 2022.

== Group A ==
=== Brazil ===
The squad was announced on 1 September 2022.

Brazil men's national basketball team – 2022 FIBA AmeriCup roster
Players
Coaches

| Pos. | No. | Name | Age – Date of birth | Height | Club | Ctr. |
|---|---|---|---|---|---|---|
| PG | 2 | Yago dos Santos | 23 – 9 March 1999 | 1.78 m (5 ft 10 in) | Ratiopharm Ulm | (Germany) |
| G | 5 | Rafa Luz | 30 – 11 February 1992 | 1.88 m (6 ft 2 in) | BC Andorra | (Spain) |
| C | 6 | Cristiano Felício | 30 – 7 July 1992 | 2.06 m (6 ft 9 in) | Granada | (Spain) |
| SG | 7 | Didi Louzada | 23 – 2 July 1999 | 1.95 m (6 ft 5 in) | Portland Trail Blazers | (United States) |
| SG | 8 | Vítor Benite | 32 – 20 February 1990 | 1.90 m (6 ft 3 in) | Gran Canaria | (Spain) |
| PG | 9 | Marcelo Huertas (C) | 39 – 25 May 1983 | 1.90 m (6 ft 3 in) | Lenovo Tenerife | (Spain) |
| F | 12 | Rafael Mineiro | 34 – 3 June 1988 | 2.08 m (6 ft 10 in) | Flamengo | (Brazil) |
| SF | 14 | Léonardo Meindl | 29 – 20 March 1993 | 2.00 m (6 ft 7 in) | Cluj-Napoca | (Romania) |
| PF | 19 | Lucas Dias | 27 – 6 July 1995 | 2.07 m (6 ft 9 in) | Franca | (Brazil) |
| C | 23 | Augusto Lima | 30 – 17 September 1991 | 2.06 m (6 ft 9 in) | Málaga | (Spain) |
| C | 28 | Lucas Mariano | 28 – 24 September 1993 | 2.08 m (6 ft 10 in) | Franca | (Brazil) |
| G | 32 | Georginho | 26 – 24 May 1996 | 1.97 m (6 ft 6 in) | Franca | (Brazil) |

Head coach

- (Brazil) Gustavo De Conti

Assistant coach(es)

- (Brazil) Vitor Galvani
- (Brazil) Hélio Rubens Filho

Legend

- (C) Team captain
- Club – describes last
  club before the tournament
- Age – describes age
  on 2 September 2022

=== Canada ===
The squad was announced on 1 September 2022.

Canada men's national basketball team – 2022 FIBA AmeriCup roster
Players
Coaches

| Pos. | No. | Name | Age – Date of birth | Height | Club | Ctr. |
|---|---|---|---|---|---|---|
| SG | 0 | Jahvon Blair | 24 – 27 March 1998 | 1.90 m (6 ft 3 in) | Newfoundland Growlers | (Canada) |
| PF | 1 | Maurice Calloo | 23 – 9 April 1999 | 2.03 m (6 ft 8 in) | Guelph Nighthawks | (Canada) |
| PG | 2 | Trae Bell-Haynes (C) | 26 – 5 September 1995 | 1.88 m (6 ft 2 in) | Budućnost | (Montenegro) |
| G | 3 | Jaylen Babb-Harrison | 29 – 7 August 1993 | 1.93 m (6 ft 4 in) | Niagara River Lions | (Canada) |
| PG | 5 | Kadre Gray | 24 – 2 November 1997 | 1.86 m (6 ft 1 in) | Fraser Valley Bandits | (Canada) |
| SG | 10 | Devonte Bandoo | 25 – 12 September 1996 | 1.89 m (6 ft 2 in) | Edmonton Stingers | (Canada) |
| C | 13 | Kalif Young | 25 – 5 April 1997 | 2.03 m (6 ft 8 in) | Medi Bayreuth | (Germany) |
| F | 14 | Abu Kigab | 23 – 3 November 1998 | 1.98 m (6 ft 6 in) | Boise State Broncos | (United States) |
| C | 22 | Chad Posthumus | 31 – 12 February 1991 | 2.08 m (6 ft 10 in) | Edmonton Stingers | (Canada) |
| SF | 41 | Lloyd Pandi | 22 – 10 December 1999 | 1.93 m (6 ft 4 in) | Carleton Ravens | (Canada) |
| F | 45 | Dalano Banton | 22 – 7 November 1999 | 2.00 m (6 ft 7 in) | Toronto Raptors | (Canada) |
| PF | 54 | Thomas Kennedy | 22 – 1 September 2000 | 2.06 m (6 ft 9 in) | Windsor Lancers | (Canada) |

Head coach

- (Canada) Nate Mitchell

Assistant coach(es)

- (Canada) David DeAveiro
- (Canada) Scott Morrison

Legend

- (C) Team captain
- Club – describes last
  club before the tournament
- Age – describes age
  on 2 September 2022

=== Colombia ===
The squad was announced on 1 September 2022.

Colombia men's national basketball team – 2022 FIBA AmeriCup roster
Players
Coaches

| Pos. | No. | Name | Age – Date of birth | Height | Club | Ctr. |
|---|---|---|---|---|---|---|
| G | 0 | Pablo Rojas | 26 – 20 February 1996 | 2.00 m (6 ft 7 in) | Lobos Brasília | (Brazil) |
| G | 1 | Juan Duarte | 25 – 13 February 1997 | 1.80 m (5 ft 11 in) | Mount Marty University | (United States) |
| PF | 2 | Tonny Trocha-Morelos | 28 – 21 June 1994 | 2.06 m (6 ft 9 in) | Jämtland Basket | (Sweden) |
| C | 3 | Juan Tello (C) | 37 – 11 May 1985 | 2.05 m (6 ft 9 in) | BC Jonava | (Lithuania) |
| PF | 5 | Alvaro Peña Muñoz | 26 – 16 December 1995 | 1.93 m (6 ft 4 in) | Team Cali | (Colombia) |
| PF | 6 | Soren De Luque | 23 – 8 September 1998 | 1.96 m (6 ft 5 in) | Titanes de Barranquilla | (Colombia) |
| G | 7 | Romario Roque | 23 – 17 December 1998 | 1.75 m (5 ft 9 in) | Pato Basquete | (Brazil) |
| PG | 10 | Hansel Atencia | 25 – 24 May 1997 | 1.75 m (5 ft 9 in) | Oviedo CB | (Spain) |
| C | 12 | Jaime Echenique | 25 – 27 April 1997 | 2.13 m (7 ft 0 in) | Capital City Go-Go | (United States) |
| PF | 14 | Yildon Mendoza | 25 – 8 September 1996 | 2.06 m (6 ft 9 in) | Team Cali | (Colombia) |
| PF | 20 | Andrés Ibargüen | 26 – 14 February 1996 | 2.00 m (6 ft 7 in) | CB Prat | (Spain) |
| SF | 55 | Hayner Montaño | 24 – 2 December 1997 | 1.90 m (6 ft 3 in) | Team Cali | (Colombia) |

Head coach

- (Colombia) Guillermo Moreno

Assistant coach(es)

- (Colombia) Tomas Díaz
- (Colombia) Raul Pabón Porras

Legend

- (C) Team captain
- Club – describes last
  club before the tournament
- Age – describes age
  on 2 September 2022

=== Uruguay ===
The squad was announced on 1 September 2022.

Uruguay men's national basketball team – 2022 FIBA AmeriCup roster
Players
Coaches

| Pos. | No. | Name | Age – Date of birth | Height | Club | Ctr. |
|---|---|---|---|---|---|---|
| PF | 1 | Gonzalo Iglesias | 29 – 4 August 1993 | 2.03 m (6 ft 8 in) | Reina Yogur Clavijo CB | (Spain) |
| SG | 3 | Joaquín Osimani | 35 – 6 May 1987 | 1.95 m (6 ft 5 in) | Club Atlético Goes | (Uruguay) |
| PG | 8 | Agustin Ubal | 19 – 19 July 2003 | 1.98 m (6 ft 6 in) | FC Barcelona | (Spain) |
| F | 10 | Emiliano Serres | 25 – 7 June 1997 | 2.06 m (6 ft 9 in) | Obras Sanitarias | (Argentina) |
| SG | 14 | Joaquín Rodríguez | 23 – 14 June 1999 | 1.94 m (6 ft 4 in) | Obras Sanitarias | (Argentina) |
| C | 15 | Esteban Batista (C) | 39 – 2 September 1983 | 2.07 m (6 ft 9 in) | Olimpia | (Uruguay) |
| PF | 18 | Sebastian Ottonello | 24 – 3 December 1997 | 1.98 m (6 ft 6 in) | Unión Atlética | (Uruguay) |
| PG | 21 | Luciano Parodi | 28 – 16 February 1994 | 1.78 m (5 ft 10 in) | Hebraica Macabi | (Uruguay) |
| PG | 21 | Juan Zanotta | 27 – 25 March 1995 | 1.82 m (6 ft 0 in) | Club Atlético Peñarol | (Uruguay) |
| C | 33 | Kiril Wachsmann | 37 – 12 November 1984 | 2.00 m (6 ft 7 in) | Malvín | (Uruguay) |
| F | 42 | Martín Rojas | 24 – 23 July 1998 | 1.93 m (6 ft 4 in) | Biguá de Villa Biarritz | (Uruguay) |
| PG | 52 | Diego Peña | 26 – 3 July 1996 | 1.95 m (6 ft 5 in) | Club Atlético Peñarol | (Uruguay) |

Head coach

- (Argentina) Rubén Magnano

Assistant coach(es)

- (Uruguay) Edgardo Kogan
- (Uruguay) Pablo Daniel

Legend

- (C) Team captain
- Club – describes last
  club before the tournament
- Age – describes age
  on 2 September 2022

== Group B ==
=== Argentina ===
The squad was announced on 2 September 2022.

Argentina men's national basketball team – 2022 FIBA AmeriCup roster
Players
Coaches

| Pos. | No. | Name | Age – Date of birth | Height | Club | Ctr. |
|---|---|---|---|---|---|---|
| SG | 2 | Máximo Fjellerup | 24 – 25 November 1997 | 1.91 m (6 ft 3 in) | Bàsquet Girona | (Spain) |
| PG | 7 | Facundo Campazzo (C) | 31 – 23 March 1991 | 1.79 m (5 ft 10 in) | Denver Nuggets | (United States) |
| PG | 8 | Nicolás Laprovíttola | 32 – 31 January 1990 | 1.94 m (6 ft 4 in) | Barcelona | (Spain) |
| SF | 9 | Nicolás Brussino | 29 – 2 March 1993 | 2.01 m (6 ft 7 in) | Gran Canaria | (Spain) |
| SG | 10 | Carlos Delfino | 40 – 29 August 1982 | 2.00 m (6 ft 7 in) | Victoria Libertas | (Italy) |
| PG | 11 | Luca Vildoza | 27 – 11 August 1995 | 1.91 m (6 ft 3 in) | Flamengo | (Brazil) |
| C | 12 | Marcos Delía | 30 – 8 August 1992 | 2.09 m (6 ft 10 in) | BC Wolves | (Lithuania) |
| SF | 14 | Gabriel Deck | 27 – 8 February 1995 | 1.98 m (6 ft 6 in) | Real Madrid | (Spain) |
| SF | 22 | Juan Pablo Vaulet | 26 – 22 March 1996 | 1.98 m (6 ft 6 in) | Manresa | (Spain) |
| PF | 25 | Tomás Chapero | 21 – 10 June 2001 | 2.06 m (6 ft 9 in) | Ourense | (Spain) |
| SG | 31 | Leandro Bolmaro | 21 – 11 September 2000 | 1.98 m (6 ft 6 in) | Utah Jazz | (United States) |
| C | 83 | Tayavek Gallizzi | 29 – 8 February 1993 | 2.05 m (6 ft 9 in) | Instituto | (Argentina) |

Head coach

- (Argentina) Pablo Prigioni

Assistant coach(es)

- (Argentina) Gonzalo García
- (Argentina) Leo Gutiérrez

Legend

- (C) Team captain
- Club – describes current
  or most recent club
- Age – describes age
  on 2 September 2022

=== Dominican Republic ===
The squad was announced on 1 September 2022.

Dominican Republic men's national basketball team – 2022 FIBA AmeriCup roster
Players
Coaches

| Pos. | No. | Name | Age – Date of birth | Height | Club | Ctr. |
|---|---|---|---|---|---|---|
| SF | 1 | Juan Miguel Suero | 29 – 11 May 1993 | 1.91 m (6 ft 3 in) | Indios de San Francisco | (Dominican Republic) |
| SG | 3 | Anyeuri Castillo | 24 – 15 November 1997 | 1.90 m (6 ft 3 in) | Soles de Santo Domingo | (Dominican Republic) |
| SF | 7 | Sadiel Rojas | 33 – 16 July 1989 | 1.93 m (6 ft 4 in) | UCAM Murcia | (Spain) |
| PG | 8 | Richard Bautista | 25 – 9 February 1997 | 1.83 m (6 ft 0 in) | Titanes del Distrito Nacional | (Dominican Republic) |
| SF | 9 | Jassel Pérez | 20 – 12 September 2001 | 1.90 m (6 ft 3 in) | Free agent |
| PG | 10 | Andrés Feliz (C) | 25 – 15 July 1997 | 1.83 m (6 ft 0 in) | Club Joventut Badalona | (Spain) |
| PF | 12 | Ángel Delgado | 27 – 20 November 1994 | 2.05 m (6 ft 9 in) | Pınar Karşıyaka | (Turkey) |
| PF | 15 | Brayan Martínez | 30 – 9 October 1991 | 2.03 m (6 ft 8 in) | Santa Ana | (Dominican Republic) |
| PF | 24 | Ángel Núñez | 30 – 9 October 1991 | 2.03 m (6 ft 8 in) | Vaqueros de Bayamón | (Puerto Rico) |
| SG | 25 | Yeison Yan | 25 – 27 November 1996 | 1.90 m (6 ft 3 in) | Motilones | (Colombia) |
| PF | 32 | Jeromy Rodriguez | 26 – 3 January 1996 | 1.98 m (6 ft 6 in) | Cañeros del Este | (Dominican Republic) |

Head coach

- (Dominican Republic) Melvyn Lopez

Assistant coach(es)

- (Dominican Republic) David Díaz
- (Dominican Republic) José Mercedes Rosario

Legend

- (C) Team captain
- Club – describes last
  club before the tournament
- Age – describes age
  on 2 September 2022

=== Puerto Rico ===
The squad was announced on 31 August 2022.

Puerto Rico men's national basketball team – 2022 FIBA AmeriCup roster
Players
Coaches

| Pos. | No. | Name | Age – Date of birth | Height | Club | Ctr. |
|---|---|---|---|---|---|---|
| PF | 1 | George Conditt IV | 22 – 22 August 2000 | 2.08 m (6 ft 10 in) | Gigantes de Carolina | (Puerto Rico) |
| SG | 11 | Stephen Thompson Jr. | 25 – 23 March 1997 | 1.94 m (6 ft 4 in) | Vaqueros de Bayamón | (Puerto Rico) |
| C | 15 | Timajh Parker-Rivera | 28 – 9 February 1994 | 2.03 m (6 ft 8 in) | Grises de Humacao | (Puerto Rico) |
| SF | 20 | Jordan Cintrón | 24 – 11 June 1998 | 2.03 m (6 ft 8 in) | Indios de Mayagüez | (Puerto Rico) |
| F | 21 | Justin Reyes | 27 – 16 March 1995 | 1.93 m (6 ft 4 in) | Pallacanestro Varese | (Italy) |
| PG | 22 | Tjader Fernández | 28 – 28 January 1994 | 1.78 m (5 ft 10 in) | Atléticos de San Germán | (Puerto Rico) |
| SG | 25 | Alfonso Plummer | 24 – 4 September 1997 | 1.85 m (6 ft 1 in) | Lavrio | (Greece) |
| C | 28 | Ismael Romero | 31 – 23 June 1991 | 2.03 m (6 ft 8 in) | Vaqueros de Bayamón | (Puerto Rico) |
| F | 32 | Chris Ortiz | 29 – 2 April 1993 | 2.03 m (6 ft 8 in) | Brujos de Guayama | (Puerto Rico) |
| G | 44 | Javier Mojica (C) | 38 – 31 August 1984 | 1.86 m (6 ft 1 in) | Vaqueros de Bayamón | (Puerto Rico) |
| PG | 51 | Tremont Waters | 24 – 10 January 1998 | 1.60 m (5 ft 3 in) | Gigantes de Carolina | (Puerto Rico) |
| G | 55 | Ethan Thompson | 23 – 4 May 1999 | 1.93 m (6 ft 4 in) | Windy City Bulls | (United States) |

Head coach

- (Puerto Rico) Nelson Colón

Assistant coach(es)

- (Puerto Rico) Rafael Cruz
- (Puerto Rico) Carlos González

Legend

- (C) Team captain
- Club – describes current
  or most recent club
- Age – describes age
  on 2 September 2022

=== Virgin Islands ===
Virgin Islands men's national basketball team – 2022 FIBA AmeriCup roster
Players
Coaches

| Pos. | No. | Name | Age – Date of birth | Height | Club | Ctr. |
|---|---|---|---|---|---|---|
| G | 0 | Amir Nesbitt | 21 – 23 July 2001 | 1.82 m (6 ft 0 in) | Hampton Pirates | (United States) |
| G | 4 | Georgio Milligan | 32 – 26 July 1990 | 1.87 m (6 ft 2 in) | União Corinthians | (Brazil) |
| SF | 5 | Jahsean Corbett | 20 – 1 July 2002 | 1.98 m (6 ft 6 in) | Chicago State Cougars | (United States) |
| F | 7 | Shaquan Jules | 22 – 23 September 1999 | 2.01 m (6 ft 7 in) | Radford Highlanders | (United States) |
| PG | 8 | Trivante Bloodman | 29 – 26 December 1992 | 1.85 m (6 ft 1 in) | Mississippi State Bulldogs | (United States) |
| F | 11 | Ivan Aska (C) | 32 – 26 June 1990 | 2.00 m (6 ft 7 in) | DEAC | (Hungary) |
| C | 13 | Rakeem Christmas | 30 – 1 December 1991 | 2.05 m (6 ft 9 in) | Yulon Luxgen | (Chinese Taipei) |
| F | 14 | Romani Hansen | 25 – 4 February 1997 | 2.03 m (6 ft 8 in) | Starwings Basket Regio Basel | (Switzerland) |
| F | 20 | Miguel López | 22 – 13 September 1999 | 1.93 m (6 ft 4 in) | Whitworth University | (United States) |
| G | 22 | Earl Baker | 22 – 26 October 1999 | 1.80 m (5 ft 11 in) | Slippery Rock University | (United States) |

Head coach

- (United States) Edniesha Curry

Assistant coach(es)

- (Guinea) Malick Kone

Legend

- (C) Team captain
- Club – describes last
  club before the tournament
- Age – describes age
  on September 2, 2022

== Group C ==
=== Mexico ===
The squad was announced on 2 September 2022.

Mexico men's national basketball team – 2022 FIBA AmeriCup roster
Players
Coaches

| Pos. | No. | Name | Age – Date of birth | Height | Club | Ctr. |
|---|---|---|---|---|---|---|
| SF | 2 | Gael Bonilla | 19 – 26 February 2003 | 2.04 m (6 ft 8 in) | Barcelona | (Spain) |
| F | 3 | Fabián Jaimes | 29 – 22 September 1992 | 1.98 m (6 ft 6 in) | Panteras de Aguascalientes | (Mexico) |
| PG | 4 | Paul Stoll (C) | 36 – 4 December 1985 | 1.80 m (5 ft 11 in) | Fuerza Regia | (Mexico) |
| F | 5 | Irwin Ávalos | 31 – 13 June 1991 | 2.01 m (6 ft 7 in) | Libertadores de Querétaro | (Mexico) |
| PG | 8 | Diego Willis | 23 – 11 May 1999 | 1.94 m (6 ft 4 in) | Libertadores de Querétaro | (Mexico) |
| SF | 10 | Gabriel Girón | 34 – 27 February 1988 | 1.91 m (6 ft 3 in) | Fuerza Regia | (Mexico) |
| PG | 11 | Santiago Ochoa | 18 – 2 January 2004 | 1.86 m (6 ft 1 in) | HD Toros of San Antonio | (United States) |
| PF | 12 | Héctor Hernández | 37 – 15 January 1985 | 2.05 m (6 ft 9 in) | Capitanes | (Mexico) |
| SG | 16 | Moisés Andriassi | 22 – 1 March 2000 | 1.77 m (5 ft 10 in) | Capitanes | (Mexico) |
| F | 24 | Omar De Haro | 27 – 13 May 1995 | 1.87 m (6 ft 2 in) | Astros de Jalisco | (Mexico) |
| C | 25 | Israel Gutiérrez | 29 – 15 January 1993 | 2.06 m (6 ft 9 in) | Dorados de Chihuahua | (Mexico) |
| F | 44 | Daniel Amigo | 26 – 13 September 1995 | 2.08 m (6 ft 10 in) | Libertadores de Querétaro | (Mexico) |

Head coach

- (Mexico) Omar Quintero

Assistant coach(es)

- (United States) Victor Canales
- (Mexico) Gustavo Quintero

Legend

- (C) Team captain
- Club – describes current
  or most recent club
- Age – describes age
  on 2 September 2022

=== Panama ===
The squad was announced on 1 September 2022.

Panama men's national basketball team – 2022 FIBA AmeriCup roster
Players
Coaches

| Pos. | No. | Name | Age – Date of birth | Height | Club | Ctr. |
|---|---|---|---|---|---|---|
| F | 3 | Alejandro Grant | 28 – 3 October 1993 | 1.98 m (6 ft 6 in) | Panteras de Aguascalientes | (Mexico) |
| PG | 4 | Isaac Hall | 19 – 27 October 2002 | 1.80 m (5 ft 11 in) | Panteras de Aguascalientes | (Mexico) |
| PG | 5 | Trevor Gaskins (C) | 32 – 24 November 1989 | 1.93 m (6 ft 4 in) | Unifacisa Paraiba | (Brazil) |
| C | 6 | Aldimir Castillo | 19 – 2 January 2003 | 2.03 m (6 ft 8 in) | Correcaminos de Colón | (Panama) |
| C | 7 | Daniel King | 35 – 25 July 1987 | 2.04 m (6 ft 8 in) | S.D. Atlético Nacional | (Panama) |
| C | 8 | Jonathan King | 32 – 25 January 1990 | 2.07 m (6 ft 9 in) | S.D. Atlético Nacional | (Panama) |
| F | 10 | Josimar Ayarza | 35 – 3 May 1987 | 2.05 m (6 ft 9 in) | Titanes de Barranquilla | (Colombia) |
| F | 16 | Eric Romero | 23 – 1 June 1999 | 1.90 m (6 ft 3 in) | Libertadores de Querétaro | (Mexico) |
| PG | 20 | José Montenegro | 23 – 3 September 1998 | 1.90 m (6 ft 3 in) | Caballos de Coclé | (Panama) |
| F | 21 | Gil Atencio | 26 – 5 June 1996 | 2.00 m (6 ft 7 in) | Dragones de Don Bosco | (Panama) |
| F | 24 | Aaron Gedeon | 23 – 11 March 1999 | 1.98 m (6 ft 6 in) | Toros de Chiriquí | (Panama) |
| PG | 55 | Carlos Rodríguez | 28 – 2 August 1994 | 1.88 m (6 ft 2 in) | Caballos de Coclé | (Panama) |

Head coach

- (Puerto Rico) Flor Meléndez

Assistant coach(es)

- (Panama) Alberto Duque

Legend

- (C) Team captain
- Club – describes current
  or most recent club
- Age – describes age
  on 2 September 2022

=== United States ===
The squad was announced on 27 August 2022.

United States men's national basketball team – 2022 FIBA AmeriCup roster
Players
Coaches

| Pos. | No. | Name | Age – Date of birth | Height | Club | Ctr. |
|---|---|---|---|---|---|---|
| G | 4 | Frank Mason III | 28 – 3 April 1994 | 1.80 m (5 ft 11 in) | Wisconsin Herd | (United States) |
| G | 5 | Norris Cole | 33 – 13 October 1988 | 1.88 m (6 ft 2 in) | Atléticos de San Germán | (Puerto Rico) |
| G | 6 | Jeremy Pargo (C) | 36 – 17 March 1986 | 1.88 m (6 ft 2 in) | Windy City Bulls | (United States) |
| G | 7 | Jodie Meeks | 35 – 21 August 1987 | 1.93 m (6 ft 4 in) | Free agent |
| G | 8 | Patrick McCaw | 26 – 25 October 1995 | 2.01 m (6 ft 7 in) | Delaware Blue Coats | (United States) |
| G | 9 | Craig Sword | 28 – 16 January 1994 | 1.90 m (6 ft 3 in) | Capital City Go-Go | (United States) |
| G | 10 | Eli Pemberton | 25 – 31 May 1997 | 1.90 m (6 ft 3 in) | Santa Cruz Warriors | (United States) |
| C | 11 | Will Davis | 29 – 9 November 1992 | 2.02 m (6 ft 8 in) | College Park Skyhawks | (United States) |
| G | 12 | Anthony Lamb | 24 – 20 January 1998 | 1.98 m (6 ft 6 in) | Free agent |
| G | 13 | Zylan Cheatham | 26 – 17 November 1995 | 1.98 m (6 ft 6 in) | Birmingham Squadron | (United States) |
| F | 14 | Gary Clark | 27 – 16 November 1994 | 1.98 m (6 ft 6 in) | Free agent |
| C | 15 | Stephen Zimmerman | 25 – 9 September 1996 | 2.11 m (6 ft 11 in) | Cairns Taipans | (Australia) |

Head coach

- (United States) Alex Jensen

Assistant coach(es)

- (United States) Michael Williams
- (United States) Steve Wojciechowski

Legend

- (C) Team captain
- Club – describes current
  or most recent club
- Age – describes age
  on 2 September 2022

=== Venezuela ===
The squad was announced on 30 August 2022.

Venezuela men's national basketball team – 2022 FIBA AmeriCup roster
Players
Coaches

| Pos. | No. | Name | Age – Date of birth | Height | Club | Ctr. |
|---|---|---|---|---|---|---|
| G | 3 | Luis Betancourt | 20 – 1 April 2002 | 1.74 m (5 ft 9 in) | Cocodrilos de Caracas | (Venezuela) |
| PG | 4 | Kender Urbina | 17 – 11 December 2004 | 1.76 m (5 ft 9 in) | Spartans Distrito Capital | (Venezuela) |
| C | 6 | Carlos López | 23 – 20 January 1999 | 2.06 m (6 ft 9 in) | Centauros de Portuguesa | (Venezuela) |
| PG | 11 | Harol Cazorla | 30 – 29 November 1991 | 1.73 m (5 ft 8 in) | Gigantes de Guayana | (Venezuela) |
| SF | 12 | Edgar Martínez | 25 – 23 January 1997 | 1.92 m (6 ft 4 in) | Guaiqueríes de Margarita | (Venezuela) |
| SF | 13 | José Ascanio | 26 – 10 January 1996 | 2.03 m (6 ft 8 in) | Guaiqueríes de Margarita | (Venezuela) |
| C | 15 | Windi Graterol (C) | 35 – 10 September 1986 | 2.04 m (6 ft 8 in) | Spartans Distrito Capital | (Venezuela) |
| PF | 16 | Elian Centen | 22 – 18 July 2000 | 2.01 m (6 ft 7 in) | Spartans Distrito Capital | (Venezuela) |
| G | 20 | Yohanner Sifontes | 27 – 19 August 1995 | 1.88 m (6 ft 2 in) | Spartans Distrito Capital | (Venezuela) |
| PF | 27 | Fernando Fuenmayor | 22 – 5 April 2000 | 2.01 m (6 ft 7 in) | Brillantes del Zulia | (Venezuela) |
| PF | 28 | Miguel Bolivar | 30 – 24 January 1992 | 1.99 m (6 ft 6 in) | Cocodrilos de Caracas | (Venezuela) |
| F | 35 | Jose Materan | 26 – 17 August 1996 | 1.96 m (6 ft 5 in) | Gladiadores de Anzoátegui | (Venezuela) |

Head coach

- (Argentina) Fernando Duró

Assistant coach(es)

- (Venezuela) Ronald Guillén
- (Venezuela) Diego Vásquez

Legend

- (C) Team captain
- Club – describes last
  club before the tournament
- Age – describes age
  on 2 September 2022
