= 2025 FIBA AmeriCup squads =

National basketball teams

The following are the squads for the 2025 FIBA AmeriCup.

Ages and clubs are as of the opening day of the tournament, 22 August 2025.

== Group A ==
=== Bahamas ===
Bahamas men's national basketball team roster
Players
Coaches

Pos.	No.	Name	Age – Date of birth	Height	Club	Ctr.
G	0	Garvin Clarke	23 – 15 September 2001	1.83 m (6 ft 0 in)	CB L'Horta Godella	(Spain)
PG	2	Dominick Bridgewater	25 – 14 May 2000	1.78 m (5 ft 10 in)	Fos Provence Basket	(France)
G	3	Franco Miller Jr.	26 – 9 February 1999	1.88 m (6 ft 2 in)	Florida Gulf Coast Eagles	(United States)
SF	4	Wilkenson Isnord	25 – 30 March 2000	1.98 m (6 ft 6 in)	GBA Sojky Pelhřimov	(Czech Republic)
G	5	Rashad Davis	28 – 29 October 1996	1.85 m (6 ft 1 in)	Vendée Challans Basket	(France)
SF	9	Joshua Dames	25 – 25 July 2000	1.88 m (6 ft 2 in)	Kansas Community College	(United States)
PF	11	Samuel Hunter	24 – 28 November 2000	2.03 m (6 ft 8 in)	BC Trepca	(Kosovo)
SF	12	Kentwan Smith	33 – 17 December 1991	2.03 m (6 ft 8 in)	BC Luleå	(Sweden)
C	14	Isaiah Mobley	25 – 24 September 1999	2.03 m (6 ft 8 in)	Delaware Blue Coats	(United States)
C	15	Jaraun Burrows	39 – 4 September 1985	1.98 m (6 ft 6 in)	Andrézieux-Bouthéon	(France)
PF	18	Lathaniel Bastian	27 – 12 May 1998	2.00 m (6 ft 7 in)	Pays Salonais Basket	(France)

Head coach

- (The Bahamas) Lourawls Nairn Jr.

Assistant coach(es)

- (The Bahamas) Nashad Mackey

Legend

- (C) Team captain
- Club – describes last
  club before the tournament
- Age – describes age
  on 22 August 2025

=== Brazil ===
Brazil men's national basketball team roster
Players
Coaches

Pos.	No.	Name	Age – Date of birth	Height	Club	Ctr.
SF	1	Guilherme Deodato	34 – 2 June 1991	1.92 m (6 ft 4 in)	Flamengo	(Brazil)
PG	2	Yago dos Santos	26 – 9 March 1999	1.78 m (5 ft 10 in)	Crvena zvezda	(Serbia)
PG	4	Alexey Borges	29 – 8 October 1995	1.88 m (6 ft 2 in)	Flamengo	(Brazil)
SG	8	Vítor Benite (C)	35 – 20 February 1990	1.90 m (6 ft 3 in)	Real Betis	(Spain)
PF	9	Lucas Dias	30 – 6 July 1995	2.07 m (6 ft 9 in)	SESI Franca	(Brazil)
PG	23	Caio Pacheco	26 – 22 February 1999	1.88 m (6 ft 2 in)	Básquet Coruña	(Spain)
SF	29	Reynan Santos	21 – 13 February 2004	1.92 m (6 ft 4 in)	Pinheiros	(Brazil)
C	30	Ruan Miranda	24 – 7 July 2001	2.03 m (6 ft 8 in)	Flamengo	(Brazil)
F	32	Georginho de Paula	29 – 24 May 1996	1.97 m (6 ft 6 in)	SESI Franca	(Brazil)
PF	43	Nathan Fernandes	21 – 16 September 2003	2.07 m (6 ft 9 in)	Athletico Paulistano	(Brazil)
F	45	Mãozinha Pereira	24 – 28 August 2000	1.98 m (6 ft 6 in)	Manisa Basket	(Turkey)
PF	51	Bruno Caboclo	29 – 21 September 1995	2.08 m (6 ft 10 in)	Hapoel Tel Aviv	(Israel)

Head coach

- (Croatia) Aleksandar Petrović

Assistant coach(es)

- (Brazil) Demétrius Conrado

Legend

- (C) Team captain
- Club – describes last
  club before the tournament
- Age – describes age
  on 22 August 2025

=== United States ===
United States men's national basketball team roster
Players
Coaches

Pos.	No.	Name	Age – Date of birth	Height	Club	Ctr.
G	4	Jarell Eddie	33 – 30 October 1991	2.01 m (6 ft 7 in)	Peristeri Athens	(Greece)
G	5	Speedy Smith	32 – 28 January 1993	1.90 m (6 ft 3 in)	Türk Telekom	(Turkey)
G	6	Javonte Smart	26 – 3 June 1999	1.93 m (6 ft 4 in)	Osceola Magic	(United States)
PG	7	Andrew Andrews	32 – 25 May 1993	1.88 m (6 ft 2 in)	BC Wolves	(Lithuania)
SG	8	Jahmi'us Ramsey	24 – 9 June 2001	1.91 m (6 ft 3 in)	Pallacanestro Trieste	(Italy)
PG	9	Langston Galloway (C)	33 – 9 December 1991	1.88 m (6 ft 2 in)	Esenler Erokspor	(Turkey)
SG	10	Jerian Grant	32 – 9 October 1992	1.93 m (6 ft 4 in)	Panathinaikos	(Greece)
F	11	Cameron Reynolds	30 – 7 February 1995	2.03 m (6 ft 8 in)	Maroussi	(Greece)
F	12	Robert Baker	27 – 28 June 1998	2.08 m (6 ft 10 in)	New Zealand Breakers	(New Zealand)
F	13	Zach Auguste	32 – 8 July 1993	2.08 m (6 ft 10 in)	KK Cedevita Olimpija	(Slovenia)
PF	14	Jack Cooley	34 – 12 April 1991	2.06 m (6 ft 9 in)	Dinamo Sassari	(Italy)
PF	15	Tyler Cavanaugh	31 – 9 February 1994	2.06 m (6 ft 9 in)	Bahçeşehir Koleji	(Turkey)

Head coach

- (United States) Stephen Silas

Assistant coach(es)

- (Democratic Republic of the Congo) Patrick Mutombo

Legend

- (C) Team captain
- Club – describes last
  club before the tournament
- Age – describes age
  on 22 August 2025

=== Uruguay ===
Uruguay men's national basketball team roster
Players
Coaches

Pos.	No.	Name	Age – Date of birth	Height	Club	Ctr.
SF	5	Juan Ignacio Ducasse	26 – 2 September 1998	2.06 m (6 ft 9 in)	Unión Atlética	(Uruguay)
PG	6	Bruno Fitipaldo (C)	34 – 2 August 1991	1.83 m (6 ft 0 in)	La Laguna Tenerife	(Spain)
F	10	Emiliano Serres	28 – 7 June 1997	2.06 m (6 ft 9 in)	Peñarol	(Uruguay)
SG	14	Joaquín Rodríguez	26 – 14 June 1999	1.94 m (6 ft 4 in)	Casademont Zaragoza	(Spain)
C	20	Pablo Gómez	22 – 24 January 2003	2.02 m (6 ft 8 in)	Club Trouville	(Uruguay)
PG	21	Luciano Parodi	31 – 16 February 1994	1.78 m (5 ft 10 in)	Nacional	(Uruguay)
G	22	Patricio Prieto	22 – 7 December 2002	1.83 m (6 ft 0 in)	Nacional	(Uruguay)
G	25	Santiago Vescovi	23 – 14 September 2001	1.88 m (6 ft 2 in)	Peñarol	(Uruguay)
SF	30	Nicolás Martínez	21 – 28 October 2003	2.07 m (6 ft 9 in)	Bàsquet Manresa	(Spain)
F	31	Bernardo Barrera	27 – 4 October 1997	1.94 m (6 ft 4 in)	Nacional	(Uruguay)
PF	35	Gonzalo Iglesias	32 – 4 August 1993	2.03 m (6 ft 8 in)	CB L'Horta Godella	(Spain)
PF	45	Mateo Bianchi	23 – 23 June 2002	2.05 m (6 ft 9 in)	Defensor Sporting	(Uruguay)

Head coach

- (Uruguay) Gerardo Jauri

Assistant coach(es)

- (Uruguay) Gonzalo Brea Rey

Legend

- (C) Team captain
- Club – describes last
  club before the tournament
- Age – describes age
  on 22 August 2025

== Group B ==
=== Canada ===
Canada men's national basketball team roster
Players
Coaches

Pos.	No.	Name	Age – Date of birth	Height	Club	Ctr.
SG	0	Jahvon Blair	27 – 27 March 1998	1.90 m (6 ft 3 in)	Chorale Roanne	(France)
PG	2	Trae Bell-Haynes (C)	29 – 11 September 1995	1.88 m (6 ft 2 in)	Casademont Zaragoza	(Spain)
G	3	Nate Darling	26 – 30 August 1998	1.90 m (6 ft 3 in)	Élan Chalon	(France)
C	5	Mfiondu Kabengele	28 – 14 August 1997	2.06 m (6 ft 9 in)	Dubai Basketball	(United Arab Emirates)
SF	7	Kyshawn George	21 – 12 December 2003	1.94 m (6 ft 4 in)	Washington Wizards	(United States)
PF	11	Leonard Miller	21 – 23 November 2003	2.00 m (6 ft 7 in)	Minnesota Timberwolves	(United States)
PG	13	Marcus Carr	26 – 6 June 1999	1.85 m (6 ft 1 in)	Würzburg Baskets	(Germany)
C	14	Charles Bediako	23 – 10 March 2002	2.11 m (6 ft 11 in)	Grand Rapids Gold	(United States)
SF	24	Isiaha Mike	28 – 11 August 1997	1.98 m (6 ft 6 in)	KK Partizan	(Germany)
PF	33	Kyle Wiltjer	32 – 20 October 1992	2.06 m (6 ft 9 in)	Reyer Venezia	(Italy)
C	54	Thomas Kennedy	24 – 1 September 2000	2.06 m (6 ft 9 in)	Cedevita Olimpija	(Slovenia)
F	55	David Muenkat	25 – 2 July 2000	2.01 m (6 ft 7 in)	Würzburg Baskets	(Germany)

Head coach

- (Canada) Nate Mitchell

Assistant coach(es)

- (Canada) Shawn Swords

Legend

- (C) Team captain
- Club – describes last
  club before the tournament
- Age – describes age
  on 22 August 2025

=== Panama ===
Panama men's national basketball team roster
Players
Coaches

Pos.	No.	Name	Age – Date of birth	Height	Club	Ctr.
G	5	Trevor Gaskins (C)	35 – 24 November 1989	1.93 m (6 ft 4 in)	Unifacisa Basquete	(Brazil)
G	8	Guillermo Navarro	22 – 7 May 2003	1.75 m (5 ft 9 in)	Toros de Chiriquí	(Panama)
G	9	Joshua Lemon	21 – 6 April 2004	1.80 m (5 ft 11 in)	Dragones de Don Bosco	(Panama)
F	10	Justin Quintero	26 – 31 October 1998	1.90 m (6 ft 3 in)	Libertadores de Querétaro	(Mexico)
SG	11	Roberto Armstrong	24 – 18 November 2000	1.75 m (5 ft 9 in)	Toros de Chiriquí	(Panama)
F	13	Anthony Hall	20 – 11 September 2004	1.95 m (6 ft 5 in)	Toros de Chiriquí	(Panama)
F	15	Luis Rodríguez Jr.	26 – 15 March 1999	1.95 m (6 ft 5 in)	Toros de Chiriquí	(Panama)
SF	19	Jonathan Young	25 – 2 October 1999	1.93 m (6 ft 4 in)	Caballos de Coclé	(Panama)
F	21	Gil Atencio	29 – 5 June 1996	2.00 m (6 ft 7 in)	URUPAN	(Uruguay)
F	24	Aaron Gedeon	26 – 11 March 1999	1.98 m (6 ft 6 in)	Correcaminos de Colón	(Panama)
C	29	Ezequiel Bell	25 – 22 November 1999	2.00 m (6 ft 7 in)	Correcaminos de Colón	(Panama)
SF	44	Sebastian Bosquez	20 – 14 June 2005	1.88 m (6 ft 2 in)	Toros de Chiriquí	(Panama)

Head coach

- (Argentina) Gonzalo García

Assistant coach(es)

- (Argentina) Imanol Hernández
- (Panama) Alberto Duque
- (Panama) Bryan Waithe

Legend

- (C) Team captain
- Club – describes last
  club before the tournament
- Age – describes age
  on 22 August 2025

=== Puerto Rico ===
Puerto Rico men's national basketball team roster
Players
Coaches

Pos.	No.	Name	Age – Date of birth	Height	Club	Ctr.
PF	0	Isaiah Pineiro	30 – 2 February 1995	2.01 m (6 ft 7 in)	Cangrejeros de Santurce	(Puerto Rico)
F	1	George Conditt IV	25 – 22 August 2000	2.12 m (6 ft 11 in)	CB Gran Canaria	(Spain)
F	6	RJ Meléndez	22 – 3 December 2002	1.98 m (6 ft 6 in)	Capitanes de Arecibo	(Puerto Rico)
G	9	Gary Browne	32 – 24 March 1993	1.85 m (6 ft 1 in)	Vaqueros de Bayamón	(Puerto Rico)
PG	10	Jose Alvarado	27 – 12 April 1998	1.83 m (6 ft 0 in)	New Orleans Pelicans	(United States)
PF	16	Alexander Kappos	28 – 26 July 1997	2.08 m (6 ft 10 in)	Criollos de Caguas	(Puerto Rico)
SF	20	Jordan Cintrón	27 – 11 June 1998	2.03 m (6 ft 8 in)	Vaqueros de Bayamón	(Puerto Rico)
G	21	Iván Gandía	27 – 14 September 1997	1.82 m (6 ft 0 in)	Santeros de Aguada	(Puerto Rico)
G	24	Gian Clavell (C)	31 – 26 November 1993	1.93 m (6 ft 4 in)	Piratas de Quebradillas	(Puerto Rico)
SG	25	Alfonso Plummer	27 – 4 September 1997	1.85 m (6 ft 1 in)	ratiopharm Ulm	(Germany)
C	28	Ismael Romero	34 – 23 June 1991	2.03 m (6 ft 8 in)	Mets de Guaynabo	(Puerto Rico)
PF	41	Arnaldo Toro	27 – 28 October 1997	2.02 m (6 ft 8 in)	Santeros de Aguada	(Puerto Rico)

Head coach

- (Puerto Rico) Carlos González

Assistant coach(es)

- (Puerto Rico) Wilhelmus Caanen
- (Puerto Rico) Christian Dalmau

Legend

- (C) Team captain
- Club – describes last
  club before the tournament
- Age – describes age
  on 22 August 2025

=== Venezuela ===
Venezuela men's national basketball team roster
Players
Coaches

Pos.	No.	Name	Age – Date of birth	Height	Club	Ctr.
PG	2	Edwin Mijares	32 – 27 October 1992	1.82 m (6 ft 0 in)	Toros de Aragua	(Venezuela)
G	3	Yeferson Guerra	22 – 6 July 2003	1.88 m (6 ft 2 in)	Unión de Santa Fe	(Argentina)
PG	8	David Cubillán (C)	38 – 27 July 1987	1.82 m (6 ft 0 in)	Trotamundos de Carabobo	(Venezuela)
PF	12	Elian Centeno	25 – 18 July 2000	2.02 m (6 ft 8 in)	Pioneros del Ávila	(Venezuela)
SF	13	José Ascanio	29 – 10 January 1996	2.02 m (6 ft 8 in)	Ciclista Olímpico	(Argentina)
C	15	Windi Graterol	38 – 10 September 1986	2.04 m (6 ft 8 in)	Spartans Distrito Capital	(Argentina)
SF	16	Anyelo Cisneros	28 – 31 January 1997	1.98 m (6 ft 6 in)	Gimnasia y Esgrima	(Argentina)
PG	20	Yohanner Sifontes	30 – 19 August 1995	1.90 m (6 ft 3 in)	Spartans Distrito Capital	(Venezuela)
G	21	Franger Pirela	22 – 19 December 2002	1.82 m (6 ft 0 in)	CB La Matanza	(Spain)
PF	27	Fernando Fuenmayor	25 – 5 April 2000	2.01 m (6 ft 7 in)	Trotamundos de Carabobo	(Venezuela)
SG	28	Carlos Daniel Fulda Carrera	23 – 23 July 2002	1.85 m (6 ft 1 in)	Gladiadores de Anzoátegui	(Venezuela)
C	77	Enrique Medina	21 – 31 January 2004	2.18 m (7 ft 2 in)	CB Santfeliuenc	(Spain)

Head coach

- (Venezuela) Ronald Guillén

Assistant coach(es)

- (Venezuela) Alexis Cedres
- (Venezuela) Yonaiker Ecker
- (Venezuela) Diego Vásquez

Legend

- (C) Team captain
- Club – describes last
  club before the tournament
- Age – describes age
  on 22 August 2025

== Group C ==
=== Argentina ===
Argentina men's national basketball team roster
Players
Coaches

Pos.	No.	Name	Age – Date of birth	Height	Club	Ctr.
PF	1	Francisco Cáffaro	25 – 19 May 2000	2.07 m (6 ft 9 in)	Bàsquet Girona	(Spain)
PG	6	Juani Marcos	25 – 6 July 2000	1.90 m (6 ft 3 in)	FC Barcelona	(Spain)
SF	9	Nicolás Brussino	32 – 2 March 1993	2.00 m (6 ft 7 in)	Gran Canaria	(Spain)
G	10	Gonzalo Corbalán	23 – 3 March 2002	1.93 m (6 ft 4 in)	San Pablo Burgos	(Spain)
PG	11	José Vildoza (C)	29 – 15 January 1996	1.91 m (6 ft 3 in)	Boca Juniors	(Argentina)
PG	16	Dylan Bordón	20 – 16 October 2004	1.90 m (6 ft 3 in)	Gran Canaria	(Spain)
C	18	Gonzalo Bressan	23 – 16 November 2001	2.05 m (6 ft 9 in)	Olímpico La Banda	(Argentina)
SF	20	Juan Bocca	20 – 18 March 2005	1.98 m (6 ft 6 in)	Obradoiro CAB	(Spain)
PF	21	Juan Fernández	22 – 21 November 2002	2.05 m (6 ft 9 in)	Bàsquet Girona	(Spain)
SF	22	Juan Pablo Vaulet	29 – 22 March 1996	1.98 m (6 ft 6 in)	Palencia Baloncesto	(Spain)
PF	23	Santiago Trouet	21 – 25 January 2004	2.05 m (6 ft 9 in)	Arizona State Sun Devils	(United States)
SG	44	Alex Negrete	24 – 2 August 2001	1.92 m (6 ft 4 in)	IACC	(Brazil)

Head coach

- (Argentina) Pablo Prigioni

Assistant coach(es)

- (Argentina) Pablo Albertinazzi
- (Argentina) Nicolas Casalanguida
- (Argentina) Pablo Favarel
- (Argentina) Herman Mandole

Legend

- (C) Team captain
- Club – describes last
  club before the tournament
- Age – describes age
  on 22 August 2025

=== Colombia ===
Colombia men's national basketball team roster
Players
Coaches

Pos.	No.	Name	Age – Date of birth	Height	Club	Ctr.
PF	0	Luis Almanza	34 – 20 August 1991	1.96 m (6 ft 5 in)	Caribbean Storm Islands	(Colombia)
G	7	Romario Roque	26 – 17 December 1998	1.75 m (5 ft 9 in)	Caribbean Storm Islands	(Colombia)
SF	8	Michaell Jackson (C)	38 – 11 July 1987	1.96 m (6 ft 5 in)	Motilones del Norte	(Colombia)
PG	10	Hansel Atencia	28 – 24 May 1997	1.75 m (5 ft 9 in)	Paisas Basketball	(Colombia)
F	11	Braian Angola	31 – 6 April 1994	1.95 m (6 ft 5 in)	CB Canarias	(Spain)
PF	12	Yildon Mendoza	28 – 8 September 1996	2.06 m (6 ft 9 in)	Toros del Valle	(Colombia)
PG	14	Sebastian Valencia	28 – 3 July 1997	2.00 m (6 ft 7 in)	Caimanes del Llano	(Colombia)
F	18	Miguel Caicedo	24 – 5 February 2001	1.98 m (6 ft 6 in)	Santa Paula de Gálvez	(Argentina)
PF	22	Álvaro Peña	29 – 16 December 1995	1.93 m (6 ft 4 in)	Paisas Basketball	(Colombia)
F	34	Jerson Caicedo	20 – 12 October 2004	2.04 m (6 ft 8 in)	IACC	(Argentina)
C	45	Cristian Solis	24 – 29 May 2001	2.06 m (6 ft 9 in)	Toros del Valle	(Colombia)
PG	70	Octavio Muñoz	24 – 5 February 2001	1.80 m (5 ft 11 in)	Caimanes del Llano	(Colombia)

Head coach

- (Colombia) Tomás Díaz

Assistant coach(es)

- (Venezuela) Ivan García

Legend

- (C) Team captain
- Club – describes last
  club before the tournament
- Age – describes age
  on 22 August 2025

=== Dominican Republic ===
Dominican Republic men's national basketball team roster
Players
Coaches

Pos.	No.	Name	Age – Date of birth	Height	Club	Ctr.
SF	1	Juan Miguel Suero	32 – 11 May 1993	1.91 m (6 ft 3 in)	Trotamundos de Carabobo	(Venezuela)
PF	2	Ángel Núñez	33 – 9 October 1991	2.03 m (6 ft 8 in)	Vaqueros de Bayamón	(Puerto Rico)
G	3	Jean Montero	22 – 3 July 2003	1.88 m (6 ft 2 in)	CB Islas Canarias	(Spain)
PG	4	Gelvis Solano	31 – 1 June 1994	1.85 m (6 ft 1 in)	Dewa United Banten	(Indonesia)
SG	5	Víctor Liz (C)	39 – 12 May 1986	1.88 m (6 ft 2 in)	Capitanes de Arecibo	(Puerto Rico)
F	8	David Jones García	23 – 24 November 2001	1.94 m (6 ft 4 in)	San Antonio Spurs	(United States)
PG	10	Andrés Feliz	28 – 15 July 1997	1.83 m (6 ft 0 in)	Real Madrid	(Spain)
C	11	Eloy Vargas	36 – 30 December 1988	2.10 m (6 ft 11 in)	Metros de Santiago	(Dominican Republic)
PF	12	Ángel Delgado	30 – 20 November 1994	2.08 m (6 ft 10 in)	Galatasaray	(Turkey)
C	22	Joel Soriano	25 – 30 January 2000	2.11 m (6 ft 11 in)	Valencia Basket	(Spain)
SF	24	Jassel Pérez	23 – 12 September 2001	1.90 m (6 ft 3 in)	Spartans Distrito Capital	(Venezuela)
PF	35	Juan Guerrero	32 – 8 July 1993	1.90 m (6 ft 3 in)	Club Fernando Valerio	(Chile)

Head coach

- (Argentina) Néstor García

Assistant coach(es)

- (Dominican Republic) David Díaz
- (Dominican Republic) Abraham Disla

Legend

- (C) Team captain
- Club – describes last
  club before the tournament
- Age – describes age
  on 22 August 2025

=== Nicaragua ===
Nicaragua men's national basketball team roster
Players
Coaches

Pos.	No.	Name	Age – Date of birth	Height	Club	Ctr.
PG	0	Deo Downs	17 – 13 March 2008	1.70 m (5 ft 7 in)	Real Estelí	(Nicaragua)
PG	1	Joost West	17 – 5 July 2008	1.80 m (5 ft 11 in)	Free agent
PF	2	Kaleb Myers	20 – 7 October 2004	2.01 m (6 ft 7 in)	Jaguares de la UAM	(Nicaragua)
PF	3	Josmel Martínez	26 – 22 May 1999	1.98 m (6 ft 6 in)	Real Estelí	(Nicaragua)
SG	5	David Watson	18 – 17 April 2007	1.85 m (6 ft 1 in)	Free agent
C	11	Andy Pérez	25 – 23 September 1999	2.05 m (6 ft 9 in)	Real Estelí	(Nicaragua)
SF	15	Norchad Omier (C)	23 – 28 August 2001	2.05 m (6 ft 9 in)	Miami RedHawks	(United States)
C	23	Bartel López	35 – 27 October 1989	2.10 m (6 ft 11 in)	Real Estelí	(Nicaragua)
SF	24	Jared Ruiz	32 – 14 September 1992	1.89 m (6 ft 2 in)	Real Estelí	(Nicaragua)
SF	29	Francisco Garth	26 – 14 March 1999	1.85 m (6 ft 1 in)	Real Estelí	(Nicaragua)
C	34	Ponce Ferguson	23 – 29 August 2001	2.03 m (6 ft 8 in)	Real Estelí	(Nicaragua)
G	35	Jensen Campbell	27 – 17 February 1998	1.98 m (6 ft 6 in)	Real Estelí	(Nicaragua)

Head coach

- (Puerto Rico) David Rosario

Assistant coach(es)

- (Nicaragua) Stacey Acuña
- (Nicaragua) Chester Linarte
- (Nicaragua) Noel Makence

Legend

- (C) Team captain
- Club – describes last
  club before the tournament
- Age – describes age
  on 22 August 2025
