= 2021 BCL Americas Playoffs =

The 2021 BCL Americas Playoffs were the 2nd playoffs of the Basketball Champions League Americas (BCL Americas) and were the concluding tournament of the 2021 BCL Americas season. The playoffs began on 10 April 2021 and ended on 13 April 2021 with the final. All games were single-elimination and were played at the Alexis Arguello Sports Complex in Managua, Nicaragua.

== Bracket ==
Quarterfinals
10 April
(Nicaragua) Real Estelí	94
(Brazil) Franca	73
10 April
(Argentina) Quimsa	60
(Brazil) Minas	87
10 April
(Argentina) San Lorenzo	75
(Brazil) São Paulo FC	78
10 April
(Brazil) Flamengo	74
(Panama) Caballos de Coclé	59

Semifinals
11 April
(Nicaragua) Real Estelí	98
(Brazil) Minas	95
11 April
(Brazil) São Paulo FC	66
(Brazil) Flamengo	75

Final
13 April
(Nicaragua) Real Estelí	80
(Brazil) Flamengo	84
Third place game
13 April
(Brazil) Minas	75
(Brazil) São Paulo FC	58

== Quarterfinals ==
10 April 2021	San Lorenzo (Argentina)	75–78	(Brazil) São Paulo FC	Managua
11:40 GMT–6	Scoring by quarter: 21–21, 21–17, 17–18, 16–22
	Pts: Vildoza 16; Rebs: Piñero 8 Asts: Fjellerup 3 PIR: Aguirre 16		Pts: Georginho 20; Rebs: Bennett, Georginho 8 Asts: Bennett 4 PIR: Georginho 22	Arena: Alexis Arguello Sports Complex

10 April 2021	Flamengo (Brazil)	74–59	(Panama) Caballos de Coclé	Managua
14:10 GMT–6	Scoring by quarter: 21–8, 14–18, 18–16, 21–17
	Pts: Marquinhos, Martinez 14; Rebs: Marquinhos 8 Asts: Dos Santos 9 PIR: Martinez 15	Boxscore	Pts: Rivera 13; Rebs: Rivera 9 Asts: Garcia, Correa 2 PIR: Rivera 19	Arena: Alexis Arguello Sports Complex

10 April 2021	Quimsa (Argentina)	60–87	(Brazil) Minas	Managua
16:40 GMT–6	Scoring by quarter: 11–17, 14–30, 22–22, 13–18
	Pts: Romero 16; Rebs: Romero 9 Asts: Baralle 3 PIR: Romero 21	Boxscore	Pts: Jackson 20; Rebs: Three players 7 Asts: Jackson 5 PIR: Jackson 26	Arena: Alexis Arguello Sports Complex

10 April 2021	Real Estelí (Nicaragua)	94–73	(Brazil) Franca	Managua
19:10 GMT–6	Scoring by quarter: 23–15, 17–18, 23–21, 31–19
	Pts: Ruiz 28; Rebs: Mojica 10; Asts: Akindele 6 PIR: Ruiz 31		Pts: Hubner 18; Rebs: Hubner 11; Asts: Neto 7 PIR: Hubner 19	Arena: Alexis Arguello Sports Complex

== Semifinals ==
11 April 2021	São Paulo FC (Brazil)	66–75	(Brazil) Flamengo	Managua
11:40 GMT–6	Scoring by quarter: 9–24, 14–13, 20–25, 23–13
	Pts: Georginho 22; Rebs: Georginho 9 Asts: Bennett 3 PIR: Georginho 25		Pts: Marquinhos 14; Rebs: Marquinhos, Martinez 7 Asts: Hettsheimeir 5 PIR: Hettsheimeir 17	Arena: Alexis Arguello Sports Complex

11 April 2021	Real Estelí (Brazil)	98–95	(Brazil) Minas	Managua
11:40 GMT–6
				Arena: Alexis Arguello Sports Complex

== Third place game ==
13 April 2021	Minas (Brazil)	75–58	(Brazil) São Paulo FC	Managua
11:40 GMT–6	Scoring by quarter: 13–15, 15–12, 29–17, 18–14
	Pts: Jackson 14; Rebs: Jackson, Nesbitt 8 Asts: Johnson 4 PIR: Da Silva 18	Boxscore	Pts: Georginho 17; Rebs: Mariano 9 Asts: Four players 2 PIR: Georginho 12	Arena: Alexis Arguello Sports Complex

== Final ==
13 April 2021	Real Estelí (Nicaragua)	80–84	(Brazil) Flamengo	Managua
19:10 GMT–6	Scoring by quarter: 27–19, 23–24, 13–25, 29–18
	Pts: De Jesus 23; Rebs: Franklin 11; Asts: Three players 4 PIR: Franklin 24	Boxscore	Pts: Dos Santos 16; Rebs: Martinez 8 Asts: Dos Santos 8 PIR: Hettsheimeir 28	Arena: Alexis Arguello Sports Complex
