= Panama men's national basketball team =

Panama
- FIBA ranking: 56 (1 September 2026)
- Joined FIBA: 1958
- FIBA zone: FIBA Americas
- National federation: Federación Panameña de Baloncesto
- Coach: Gonzalo García

Olympic Games
- Appearances: 1

FIBA World Cup
- Appearances: 4

FIBA AmeriCup
- Appearances: 14
- Medals: None
Home	Away

The Panama men's national basketball team (Spanish: selección de baloncesto de Panamá) represents Panama in men's international basketball competitions, The team represents both FIBA and FIBA Americas.

With four qualifications to the Basketball World Cup, one qualification to the Olympic Games, and one medal at the Pan American Games, Panama has traditionally been the dominant basketball power in Central America.

== History ==
Basketball in Panama rose to international prominence in the 1960s and 1970s, when the men's national team emerged as one of the strongest in Central America and the Caribbean.

Panama made its debut at the FIBA World Championship in 1970, finishing 9th overall. This marked the country's first appearance on the global stage, showcasing a new generation of Panamanian talent.

The team enjoyed its golden era during the 1970s. At the 1972 Summer Olympics in Munich, Panama qualified for the Olympic basketball tournament for the first time in its history, finishing in 9th place.

Regionally, Panama became a regular contender in the FIBA AmeriCup (formerly the Tournament of the Americas). The team won the bronze medal at the 1967 Pan American Games and continued to challenge regional powers such as Puerto Rico and Brazil.

After a period of decline in the 1980s and 1990s, Panama returned to the World Cup stage in 2006, qualifying for the tournament in Japan. Despite a difficult group, the appearance reestablished Panama’s presence among the top teams of the Americas.

In the 21st century, the national team has remained competitive in the FIBA AmeriCup and FIBA Basketball World Cup qualification (Americas) cycles. While facing challenges from larger basketball nations in the region, Panama continues to serve as one of the traditional basketball powers of Central America, producing players who have competed professionally in Europe, South America, and the United States.

== Tournament record ==
=== Olympic Games ===
- 1968 – 12th

=== FIBA World Cup ===
- 1970 – 9th
- 1982 – 9th
- 1986 – 19th
- 2006 – 21st

=== Pan American Games ===
- 1951 – 6th
- 1967 – (3rd place)
- 1971 – 6th
- 1979 – 7th
- 1987 – 6th
- 2007 – 5th

=== FIBA AmeriCup ===
- 1984 – 4th
- 1989 – 11th
- 1992 – 8th
- 1993 – 8th
- 1999 – 9th
- 2001 – 6th
- 2005 – 5th
- 2007 – 9th
- 2009 – 8th
- 2011 – 8th
- 2015 – 7th
- 2017 – 12th
- 2022 – 11th
- 2025 – 12th

=== Central American Championship ===
- 1995 – 4th place
- 1999 – 4th place
- 2001 – (3rd place)
- 2004 – (3rd place)
- 2006 – (1st place)
- 2008 – 6th
- 2010 – (3rd place)
- 2012 – 4th
- 2014 – 5th

== Team ==
=== Current roster ===
Roster for the 2025 FIBA AmeriCup.

Panama men's national basketball team roster
Players
Coaches

Pos.	No.	Name	Age – Date of birth	Height	Club	Ctr.
G	5	Trevor Gaskins (C)	35 – 24 November 1989	1.93 m (6 ft 4 in)	Unifacisa Basquete	(Brazil)
G	8	Guillermo Navarro	22 – 7 May 2003	1.75 m (5 ft 9 in)	Toros de Chiriquí	(Panama)
G	9	Joshua Lemon	21 – 6 April 2004	1.80 m (5 ft 11 in)	Dragones de Don Bosco	(Panama)
F	10	Justin Quintero	26 – 31 October 1998	1.90 m (6 ft 3 in)	Libertadores de Querétaro	(Mexico)
SG	11	Roberto Armstrong	24 – 18 November 2000	1.75 m (5 ft 9 in)	Toros de Chiriquí	(Panama)
F	13	Anthony Hall	20 – 11 September 2004	1.95 m (6 ft 5 in)	Toros de Chiriquí	(Panama)
F	15	Luis Rodríguez Jr.	26 – 15 March 1999	1.95 m (6 ft 5 in)	Toros de Chiriquí	(Panama)
SF	19	Jonathan Young	25 – 2 October 1999	1.93 m (6 ft 4 in)	Caballos de Coclé	(Panama)
F	21	Gil Atencio	29 – 5 June 1996	2.00 m (6 ft 7 in)	URUPAN	(Uruguay)
F	24	Aaron Gedeon	26 – 11 March 1999	1.98 m (6 ft 6 in)	Correcaminos de Colón	(Panama)
C	29	Ezequiel Bell	25 – 22 November 1999	2.00 m (6 ft 7 in)	Correcaminos de Colón	(Panama)
SF	44	Sebastian Bosquez	20 – 14 June 2005	1.88 m (6 ft 2 in)	Toros de Chiriquí	(Panama)

Head coach

- (Argentina) Gonzalo García

Assistant coach(es)

- (Argentina) Imanol Hernández
- (Panama) Alberto Duque
- (Panama) Bryan Waithe

Legend

- (C) Team captain
- Club – describes last
  club before the tournament
- Age – describes age
  on 22 August 2025

=== Head coach position ===
- (United States) Nolan Richardson: 2005
- (Argentina) Guillermo Vecchio: 2006
- (United States) Nolan Richardson: 2007

=== Past rosters ===
1968 Olympic Games: finished 12th among 16 teams

Davis Peralta, Norris Webb, Luis Sinclair, Pedro Rivas, Eliecer Ellis, Calixto Malcom, Nicolás Noé Alvarado, Ernesto Arturo Agard, Francisco Checa, Julio Osorio, Pércibal Eduardo Blades, Ramón Reyes (Coach: Eugenio Luzcando)

1970 World Championship: finished 9th among 13 teams

Davis Peralta, Luis Sinclair, Pedro Rivas, Ernesto Arturo Agard, Julio Osorio, Pércibal Eduardo Blades, Julio Andrade, Herbert Cousins, Ronald Walton, Cecilio Straker, Mario Peart, Hector Montalvo (Coach: Carl Pirelli Minetti)

1982 World Championship: finished 9th among 13 teams

Ernesto "Tito" Malcolm, Rolando Frazer, Mario Butler, Rodolfo Gill, Fernando Pinillo, Reggie Grenald, Braulio Rivas, Arturo Brown, Mario Galvez, Adolfo Medrick, Eddie Joe Chávez, Alfonso Smith (Coach: Jim Baron)

1986 World Championship: finished 19th among 24 teams

Ernesto "Tito" Malcolm, Mario Butler, Rolando Frazer, Reggie Grenald, Rodolfo Gill, Fernando Pinillo, Braulio Rivas, Adolfo Medrick, Cirilo Escalona, Mario Gálvez, Enrique Grenald, Daniel Macias (Coach: Frank Holness)

2006 World Championship: finished 21st among 24 teams

Ed Cota, Rubén Garcés, Jaime Lloreda, Ruben Douglas, Michael Hicks, Maximiliano "Max" Gómez, Eric Omar Cardenas, Kevin Daley, Antonio Enrique García, Jair Peralta, Jamaal Levy, Dionisio Gómez (Coach: Guillermo Edgardo Vecchio)

At the 2015 FIBA Americas Championship:

Panama men's national basketball team roster roster
Players
Coaches

Pos.	No.	Name	Age – Date of birth	Height	Club
PG	4	Joel Muñoz	35 – 24 June 1980	1.83 m (6 ft 0 in)	Leones de Managua	(Nicaragua)
PG	5	Trevor Gaskins	25 – 24 November 1989	1.88 m (6 ft 2 in)	Estudiantes Bahía Blanca	(Argentina)
SG	6	J. R. Pinnock	31 – 11 December 1983	1.96 m (6 ft 5 in)	Huracanes del Atlántico	(Dominican Republic)
F	7	Jamelle Horne	26 – 4 November 1988	2.00 m (6 ft 7 in)	Toyama Grouses	(Japan)
G/F	8	Jonathan King	25 – 25 January 1990	1.98 m (6 ft 6 in)	Cojute	(El Salvador)
F/C	9	Jamaal Levy	32 – 8 January 1983	2.06 m (6 ft 9 in)	Estudiantes Bahía Blanca	(Argentina)
SF	10	Josimar Ayarza	28 – 3 May 1987	2.05 m (6 ft 9 in)	Culiacán	(Mexico)
G/F	11	Michael Hicks (C)	39 – 4 August 1976	1.96 m (6 ft 5 in)	Hebraica y Macabi	(Uruguay)
SF	12	Ernesto Oglivie	26 – 30 June 1989	1.99 m (6 ft 6 in)	San Marcos	(El Salvador)
PF	13	Gyno Pomare	29 – 5 April 1986	2.04 m (6 ft 8 in)	Aomori Wat's	(Japan)
F/C	14	Jose Lloreda	34 – 10 November 1980	2.06 m (6 ft 9 in)	Atenienses de Manatí	(Puerto Rico)
F/C	15	Rubén Garcés	41 – 17 October 1973	2.06 m (6 ft 9 in)	Club Malvin	(Uruguay)

Head coach

- (Spain) Joaquín Ruiz Lorente

Assistant coach(es)

- (Panama) Mario Butler
- (Panama) Luis Julio

Legend

- Club field describes latest professional club
- Age field is age on August 30, 2015
- (C) – Team Captain

== Panama Pipeline ==
During the late 1970s and early 1980s, various Panama players played their college basketball in the United States at NAIA school Briar Cliff College as part of head coach Ray Nacke's "Panama Pipeline". Some of the members included national team members Rolando Frazier, Ernesto "Tito" Malcolm, Mario Butler, Eddie Warren, Reggie Grenald, and Mario Galvez. These players helped Briar Cliff to many NAIA Regional Championships, National Tournament appearances, and in 1981 the Chargers were ranked No. 1 in the nation in the NAIA's final regular season poll.

Since 2000, there has been a new group of Panamanian players that have come through the national Superior Basketball Circuit (CBS), the under-21 Panamanian national team and NCAA Division I colleges in America. These years saw Panama qualify for four pre-Olympic qualifiers, five pre-World Championships, the 2006 FIBA World Championship in Japan and the 2010 Youth Olympic Games in Singapore. The domestic developmental pathway uses regional leagues to spot talent and most of them move to the American college basketball league before moving into the senior Panamanian team.

Despite its small size, Panama Basketball has managed to qualify to big tournaments and cause upsets, such as beating the United States in the Pan American Games in Rio de Janeiro, Brazil in 2007. Their style has been influenced by their culture of street basketball, especially visible in their persistence, which is what has helped the team gain international success.

== Kit ==
=== Manufacturer ===
2015: Nike
