= Joel Muñoz =

Panamanian basketball player

Dragones de Don Bosco
- Position: Point guard
- League: LPB Panama

Personal information
- Born: June 24, 1980 (age 46) Panama City, Panama
- Listed height: 1.83 m (6 ft 0 in)
- Listed weight: 82 kg (181 lb)

Career history
- 2012–2013: Paulistano
- 2013–2014: Liga Sorocabana
- 2014–2015: Leones A. de Managua
- 2015–2016: Correcaminos de Colón
- 2016–2017: Caballos de Coclé
- 2017–2020: Toros de Chiriquí
- 2020–present: Dragones de Don Bosco

Career highlights
- LPB Panama MVP (2017); LPB Panama Top Scorer (2017); 6× LPB Panama assists leader (2015–2021)
Medals
Joel Muñoz
Medal record
Men's basketball
Representing Panama
Centrobasket
Bronze medal – third place	2010 Santo Domingo	
FIBA COCABA Championship
Gold medal – first place	2004 San Salvador	
Bronze medal – third place	2009 Cancún	

Joel Gabriel Muñoz Castillo (born June 24, 1980) is a Panamanian professional basketball player who plays for the Dragones de Don Bosco of the LPB Panama He is also a member of the Panama men's national basketball team.

Muñoz has played professional basketball in Panama, Uruguay, Brazil, and Mexico since beginning his career with Tumba Muerto Colosos in the Panama National Basketball League in 2000. In his most recent season, he averaged 4.3 points and 4.2 assists per game with Potros ITSON in the Mexican Liga Nacional de Baloncesto Profesional.

Muñoz is also a member of the Panama men's national basketball team. He competed with the team at the FIBA Americas Championship in 2005, 2007, and 2009; Centrobasket in 2008; and the COCABA Championship in 2004 and 2009. He averaged 10 points, 4.2 rebounds and 4 assists per game
