= Flor Meléndez =

Puerto Rican basketball player and coach (born 1947)

Caballos de Coclé
- Title: Head coach
- League: LPB Panama

Personal information
- Born: January 12, 1947 (age 79) Cidra, Puerto Rico
- Listed height: 6 ft 2 in (1.88 m)
- Listed weight: 190 lb (86 kg)

Career information
- Playing career: 1965–1977
- Position: Shooting guard

Career history

Playing
- 1965—1971: Santos de San Juan
- 1972—1977: Gigantes de Carolina

Coaching
- 2011–2013: Puerto Rico National Team
- 2021–present: Caballos de Coclé

Career highlights
- As coach: FIBA Intercontinental Cup champion (1983)

Flor Meléndez Montañez (born January 12, 1947) is a Puerto Rican retired basketball player and current coach. He is a former head coach of Puerto Rico's men's national basketball team, Argentina men's national basketball team, and Panama men's national basketball team. Currently, he coaches in the Baloncesto Superior Nacional as an assistant coach for Gigantes de Carolina.

== Biography ==
=== Early life ===
Meléndez is the son of Florencio Meléndez and Emilia Montañez. He grew up alongside seven brothers and three sisters. Two of his brothers, Jorge and Diego, also had notable careers as basketball players.

Meléndez enjoyed sports since a young age. He moved to Cantera, a San Juan area that is close to the childhood homes of salsa singer Andy Montañez and world boxing champion Ossie Ocasio, when he was still a child. At Cantera, he was enrolled at the Oratorio San Juan Bosco school, where he participated in one of Puerto Rico's best known Association football programs, the "Don Bosco" teams. He also enjoyed playing baseball.

Although Meléndez would have probably been chosen to play on Puerto Rico's Liga de Baloncesto Superior (Puerto Rico's professional basketball league) he decided to pursue basketball as a future career, playing in the YMCA before entering the Puerto Rico's professional basketball league in 1965, with San Juan's squad.

=== Professional career ===
Meléndez began his coaching career in 1967, coaching a youth team. In 1968, Meléndez became a member of the Puerto Rican national basketball team that competed at the 1968 Olympic Games in Mexico City. He also represented the country in Spain, Venezuela and the Dominican Republic as a player with the national team.

Meléndez won four youth championships as head coach between 1967 and 1973, year in which he was traded from San Juan to the Gigantes de Carolina team in the BSN. Meléndez became head coach of the Puerto Rican national women's basketball team in 1976. He helped the Gigantes reach the BSN finals in 1979, but they lost to Raymond Dalmau's Quebradillas Pirates for the championship. That year, Meléndez retired as a player and decided to concentrate on his coaching career. In 1978, he stepped off as coach of the women's national team, having won two gold medals with the women's youth team and a bronze one with the veteran's team, earned at the Central American and Caribbean Games held in Medellín, Colombia.

Upon retiring as head coach of the female national team, Meléndez made his debut as BSN head coach, with the Gigantes. He coached them into two more consecutive finals, but they again fell short to the Dalmau led Piratas de Quebradillas, in 1978 and 1979. His first year as head coach of the Gigantes, Meléndez won the BSN's coach of the year award. That same year, he became head coach of the men's national team, leading them to a gold medal in the Pre-Olympics. Because United States President Jimmy Carter announced a boycott of the 1980 Olympics in Moscow, Meléndez was deprived of participating in his second Olympic Games. In 1981, Meléndez returned to the finals, this time coaching the Bayamón Cowboys, who, helped by stars such as Rubén Rodríguez, Jose Sosa and Roberto Valderas, won the national championship by defeating Fico Lopez, Mario Morales and the Julio Toro coached Guaynabo Mets. Meléndez and Toro sustained a coaching rivalry during the early 1980s that lasted a few years. In 1982, the Cowboys lost to the Mets in the tournament's semifinals.

Meléndez remained as head coach of the men's national team until 1983, when he retired as head coach of that organization, having led them to a silver medal at the 1979 Pan American Games held in San Juan, and at the 1981 Centrobasket tournament as well as the 1982 Central American and Caribbean games.

From 1982 to 1985, Meléndez coach the Obras Sanitarias and guided the team to the 1983 FIBA Intercontinental Cup title, becoming the first Puerto Rican coach to win the competition.

In 1985, Meléndez led José Ortiz and the Atleticos de San German to that franchise's first championship in 30 years. He then moved to Argentina, where he was named head coach of that country's national team. He coached in Argentina's professional league, and had a stint as head coach of a professional team in Venezuela. Meléndez would later on move to Panama, where he also was head coach of the national team.

In 1992, Melendez earned his second BSN coach of the year award, and he repeated it in 1993. Back at the helm of the Bayamón Cowboys, Meléndez won his third national championship in 1995, leading the team to back to back titles when they also conquered the 1996 championship. In 1999, Meléndez made history by taking Club de Regatas Vasco da Gama, the Brazilian basketball team to the McDonald's Cup final, facing NBA champion San Antonio Spurs. With Vasco, Meléndez won the Brazilian Championship and South American basketball champion. Meléndez was still coaching the Cowboys in 2004, when, as assistant coach, he finally attended his second Olympic Games, after Puerto Rico's national men's basketball team won a bronze medal at the 2003 pre-Olympic Games to qualify for the Athens sports celebration.

Meléndez has also coached the Ponce Lions in the BSN. He recorded his 600th career win on April 24, 2017. As a basketball player, Meléndez retired as one of only 65 players in history to reach the 5,000 points mark in the BSN, having scored 5,088 points during his career.

In 2020 Meléndez was managing the Indios de Mayagüez team until the season was postponed on account of a global pandemic.

In 2021, Melendez began as the head coach of Mayagüez. He resigned in mid-August, and became an assistant coach at Carolina.

== Personal life ==
Melendez's grandson Jhivvan Jackson plays college basketball for UTSA. At the end of March 2020, Melendez was hospitalized after contracting the coronavirus during the 2020 pandemic. He recovered and tested negative by April. His wife who had also tested positive, recovered as well.
