= 2021 BCL Americas Final =

- Event: 2021 BCL Americas
Flamengo	Real Estelí
(Brazil)	(Nicaragua)
84	80
Head coach: Gustavo de Conti	Head coach: David Rosario
	1	2	3	4	Total
Flamengo	25	12	23	20	80
Real Estelí	24	20	23	17	84
- Date: 14 April 2021
- Venue: Alexis Arguello Sports Complex, Managua
- MVP: Rafael Hettsheimeir

The 2021 BCL Americas Final was the final game of the 2021 BCL Americas, the 2nd season of the league under its new entity and the 14th of the pan-American premier basketball league organised by FIBA. It was played at the Alexis Arguello Sports Complex in Managua on 14 April 2021. The game was played between Nicaraguan club Real Estelí and Brazilian club Flamengo.

Flamengo won the final and captured its second pan-American championship, thus also qualifying for the 2022 FIBA Intercontinental Cup.

== Teams ==
In the following table, finals until 2020 were in the FIBA Americas League era.

Team	Previous final appearances (bold indicates winners)
(Nicaragua) Real Estelí	None
(Brazil) Flamengo	2 (**2014**, 2020)

== Road to the final ==
(Nicaragua) Real Estelí		Round	(Brazil) Flamengo	
Opponent	Result	Group phase	Opponent	Result
(Panama) Caballos de Coclé	78–69 (H)	Gameday 1	(Brazil) Minas	79–69 (H)
(Colombia) Titanes de Barranquilla	79–88 (H)	Gameday 2	(Argentina) Instituto	Cancelled
(Panama) Caballos de Coclé	74–72 (N)	Gameday 3	(Argentina) Instituto	78–77 (N)
(Colombia) Titanes de Barranquilla	66–98 (A)	Gameday 4	(Brazil) Minas	96–93 (A)
(Panama) Caballos de Coclé	72–78 (A)	Gameday 5	(Argentina) Instituto	70–61 (N)
(Colombia) Titanes de Barranquilla	81–72 (N)	Gameday 6	(Brazil) Minas	90–80 (A)
**Group A first place**: Pos / Team / Pld / Pts; **1** / (Nicaragua) Real Estelí / **6** / **10**; 2 / (Colombia) Titanes Barranquilla / 6 / **8**; 3 / (Panama) Caballos de Coclé / 6 / **9**; Source: BCL Americas		Group phase	**Group D first place**: Pos / Team / Pld / Pts; **1** / (Brazil) Flamengo / **5** / **10**; 2 / (Brazil) Minas / 6 / **8**; 3 / (Argentina) Instituto / 5 / **6**; Source: BCL Americas	
Opponent	Result	Playoffs	Opponent	Result
(Brazil) Franca	94–73	Quarterfinals	(Panama) Caballos de Coclé	74–59
(Brazil) Minas	98–95	Semifinals	(Brazil) São Paulo FC	75–66

- (H): Home game
- (A): Away game
- (N): Neutral venue

== Game details ==
13 April 2021	Real Estelí (Nicaragua)	80–**84**	(Brazil) **Flamengo**	Managua
19:10 GMT–6	Scoring by quarter: **27**–19, 23–**24**, 13–**25**, **29**–18
	Pts: De Jesús 23; Rebs: Franklin 11; Asts: Three players 4 PIR: Franklin 24	Boxscore	Pts: Dos Santos 16; Rebs: Martinez 8 Asts: Dos Santos 8 PIR: Hettsheimeir 28	Arena: Alexis Arguello Sports Complex

Starters:			Pts	Reb	Ast
PG	0	(Puerto Rico) Jezreel De Jesús	23	9	4
SG	44	(Puerto Rico) Javier Mojica	16	5	2
SF	42	(Puerto Rico) Alexander Franklin	14	11	4
PF	32	(Puerto Rico) Renaldo Balkman	13	7	4
C	23	(Nicaragua) Bartel Lopez	2	1	1
Reserves:					
G	1	(Nicaragua) Vansdell Wester	DNP		
PG	4	(Nicaragua) Sharlon Hodgson	0	0	1
SF	9	(Nicaragua) Dalton Cacho	2	0	0
F	15	(Nicaragua) Andy Estrada	DNP		
C	17	(Nigeria) Jeleel Akindele	2	4	2
SF	24	(Nicaragua) Jared Ruiz	8	2	1
F	29	(Nicaragua) Francisco Garth	DNP		
Head coach:
(Puerto Rico) David Rosario

**Real Estelí**	**Flamengo**

Estelí	Statistics	Flamengo
31/65 (48%)	2-pt field goals	27/66 (41%)
7/17 (41%)	3-pt field goals	13/39 (33%)
11/15 (73%)	Free throws	17/27 (63%)
8	Offensive rebounds	11
32	Defensive rebounds	28
40	Total rebounds	39
18	Assists	22
15	Turnovers	8
7	Steals	8
4	Blocks	3
23	Fouls	17

2021 BCL Americas champions

**Flamengo**
1st league title
2nd continental title

Starters:			Pts	Reb	Ast
PG	2	(Brazil) Yago dos Santos	16	2	8
SF	11	(Brazil) Marquinhos	15	3	3
SF	25	(Mexico) Luke Martinez	12	8	2
PF	71	(Brazil) Léo Demétrio	0	1	0
C	30	(Brazil) Rafael Hettsheimeir	13	6	3
Reserves:					
G	7	(Brazil) Jhonatan Luz	8	2	2
SF	8	(Argentina) Luciano González	DNP		
G	9	(Brazil) Ryan Miranda	DNP		
C	12	(Brazil) Rafael Mineiro	6	4	3
PF	16	(Brazil) Carlos Olivinha	DNP		
PF	20	(Brazil) Rafael Rachel	DNP		
PG	91	(Argentina) Diego Figueredo	1	0	0
Head coach:
(Brazil) Gustavo de Conti
