= Jaime Lloreda =

Panamanian basketball player

Caballos de Coclé
- Position: Power forward / center
- League: Liga Profesional de Baloncesto

Personal information
- Born: November 10, 1980 (age 46) Colón, Panama
- Listed height: 6 ft 9 in (2.06 m)
- Listed weight: 255 lb (116 kg)

Career information
- High school: Berkshire Academy (Homestead, Florida)
- College: Dixie State (2000–2002); LSU (2002–2004)
- NBA draft: 2004: undrafted
- Playing career: 2000–present

Career history
- 2004–2005: Karşıyaka
- 2005–2006: Lokomotiv Rostov
- 2006: Al-Ittihad (Jeddah)
- 2006–2007: Bosna
- 2007–2008: Varese
- 2008–2009: Roseto
- 2009: Hebraica y Macabi
- 2009–2010: Zaragoza
- 2010–2011: Halcones Rojos
- 2011: San Germán
- 2011: Ciclista Olímpico
- 2011–2012: Atenas de Córdoba
- 2012: San Germán
- 2012: Titanes del Licey
- 2012–2013: Juventud Sionista
- 2013: Mets de Guaynabo
- 2013: Indios de San Francisco
- 2013–2014: Pioneros
- 2014: Vaqueros de Bayamón
- 2015–2016: Atenas de Córdoba
- 2016–2017: Hebraica y Macabi
- 2017–2020: Mineros de Zacatecas
- 2020–present: Caballos de Coclé

Career highlights
- FIBA Americas League Top Scorer (2011); Second-team All-SEC (2004)
Medals
Men's basketball
Representing Panama
Centrobasket
Gold medal – first place	2006 Panama City
Bronze medal – third place	2010 Santo Domingo
Central American and Caribbean Games
Silver medal – second place	2006 Cartagena

José Jaime Lloreda Ferrón (born November 10, 1980) is a Panamanian professional basketball player. He is a longtime member of the Panama men's national basketball team.

== College career ==
Lloreda played two years of junior college ball for Dixie State College in St. George, Utah after graduating from the Berkshire Academy in Homestead, Florida. He was a dominant power forward in two years for the Ragin' Red, averaging 16.4 points and 10.5 rebounds per game in his first season and 20.5 points and 9.5 rebounds per game in his second season. After his second season, Lloreda was named NJCAA National Player of the Year after leading his team to an 82-81 national championship over Coffeyville Community College.

Lloreda played his last two years of college ball for Louisiana State University. He started 29 of 30 games in his first season with the Tigers, averaging 12.3 points and 9 rebounds per game in helping the Tigers to an NCAA Tournament appearance. He scored 21 points and grabbed 14 rebounds in a first round loss to Purdue University. In his second season with the Tigers, Lloreda averaged 16.9 points and an SEC-leading 11.6 rebounds per game en route to being selected First Team All-Southeastern Conference. Despite playing only two years with the Tigers, he ranks fifth on the career blocked shots list and sixth in career field goal percentage.

== Professional career ==
Although considered a candidate to be drafted in the 2004 NBA draft on the strength of his solid LSU career, Lloreda went undrafted. He began his professional career overseas with Pınar Karşıyaka of the Turkish Basketball League. In 18 games with the team, Lloreda put up strong numbers, averaging 15.8 points and 9.7 rebounds per game. The following year, he joined Lokomotiv Rostov of the Russian Basketball Super League. He averaged 14.9 points and 10.9 rebounds in 14 games of league action and 16.8 points and 11.5 rebounds in FIBA EuroCup action, helping the team to a quarterfinal appearance. In the succeeding seasons, Lloreda has bounced around the globe to teams in Saudi Arabia, Bosnia, Italy, and Panama. At season 2008–09, he played for Seven 2007 Roseto of the Italian League, averaging 15.3 points and 9.5 rebounds per game in 19 games of action.

== National team career ==
Lloreda is a long-time member of the Panama men's national basketball team. He competed for the team at the 2005, 2007, and 2009 FIBA Americas Championship and the 2009 FIBA COCABA Championship. He also participated in the 2006 FIBA World Championship with the team after they were a surprise qualifier by finishing fifth at the FIBA Americas Championship 2005, despite starting off the quarterfinal round with an 0–3 record.
