= Marcelo Signorelli =

Italian-Uruguayan basketball player, coach, and author

Personal information
- Born: 8 January 1963 (age 63)
- Position: Head coach
- Coaching career: 1993–present

Career history

Coaching
- 2016: Correcaminos Colon (Panama)
- 2016–2018: Uruguay National Basketball Team

Marcelo Signorelli (born 8 January 1963) is an Italian-Uruguayan professional basketball coach, book author and former player. He has two daughters named Valentina (36) and Paulina (24). His father Americo Signorelli was a journalist recognized in Uruguay. He served as the head coach of the Uruguayan National Basketball Team from 2016 to 2018.

In 2016, he held the head coach position of the Correcaminos Colon of the Liga Panameña de Baloncesto, Panama's first division, and the international FIBA Americas League.
