= Joaquín Ruiz Lorente =

Spanish basketball player and manager

China men's national basketball team
- Title: Assistant coach

Personal information
- Born: April 14, 1966 (age 60) Zaragoza, Spain
- Listed height: 1.87 m (6 ft 2 in)

Career information
- Playing career: 1983–2002
- Position: Point guard

Career history

Playing
- 1983–1986: Zaragoza
- 1986–1987: Gran Canaria
- 1987–1991: Zaragoza
- 1991–1993: Unicaja
- 1993–1994: Valencia
- 1994–1995: Peñas Huesca
- 1995–1997: Gran Canaria
- 1997–2001: Cantabria Lobos
- 2001–2002: Breogán

Coaching
- 2010–2014: CAI Zaragoza (assistant)
- 2014–2015: CAI Zaragoza
- 2016–2017: Panama
- 2016–2019: Liaoning Flying Leopards (assistant)
- 2020–2024: Guangzhou Loong Lions (assistant)
- 2024–present: China Men (assistant)

Joaquín Ruiz Lorente (born April 14, 1966) is a Spanish retired professional basketball player who currently serves as an assistant coach of the China men's national basketball team.

== Playing career ==
The career of Ruiz Lorente began with CB Zaragoza, with players like José Luis Llorente or Pepe Arcega. In 1991, he left the team of his born city for playing with other Liga ACB teams. He totally spent 18 seasons in the league, playing 453 games.

=== Honors ===
- Copa del Rey: (2)
  - 1984, 1990

== Coaching career ==
Ruiz Lorente started his career as assistant coach of José Luis Abós at CAI Zaragoza during four seasons, becoming the head coach in August 2014, when Abós resigned due an illness. He was sacked in November 2015 after an awful start of the 2015–16 season.

On 31 March 2016, Ruiz Lorente was appointed as head coach of the Panama men's national basketball team.

Six months later, Ruiz Lorente agreed terms with Chinese league team Liaoning Flying Leopards, but despite this contract, he will continue being the Panamese national team coach.
