= Jezreel De Jesús =

Puerto Rican basketball player

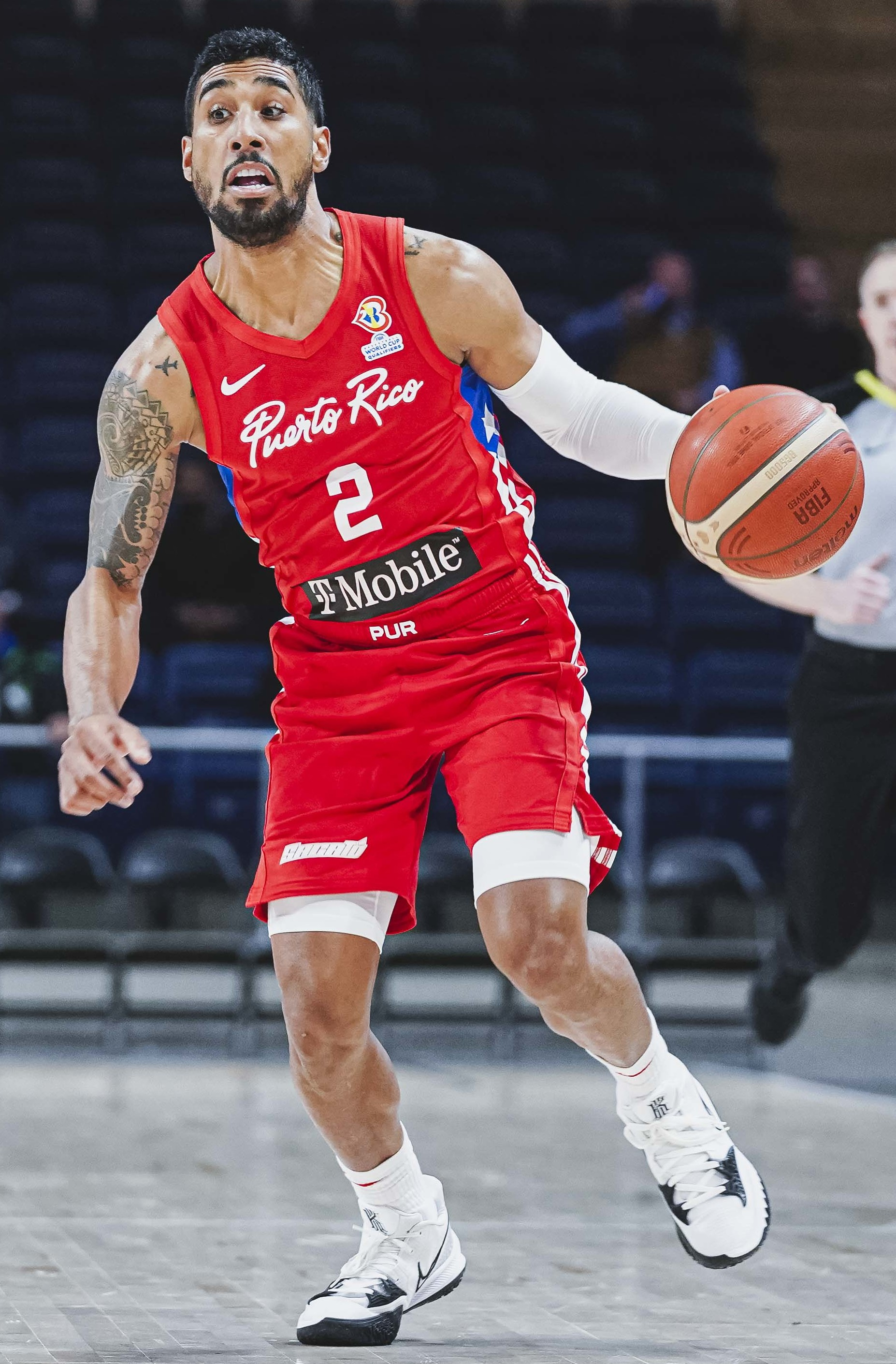
- De Jesús with Puerto Rico during the qualifiers for the 2023 FIBA Basketball World Cup

Personal information
- Born: 5 May 1991 (age 35) Carolina, Puerto Rico
- Listed height: 1.86 m (6 ft 1 in)
- Listed weight: 82 kg (181 lb)

Career information
- Playing career: 2012–present
- Position: Point guard

Career history
- 2012–2013: Leones de Ponce
- 2014: Maratonistas de Coamo
- 2014: Barrancabermeja Ciudad Futuro
- 2014–2015: Guaiqueríes de Margarita
- 2015: Maratonistas de Coamo
- 2015: Fuerza Regia de Monterrey
- 2016: Guaiqueríes de Margarita
- 2016: Santeros de Aguada
- 2017: Al-Wakrah
- 2017: Atenas
- 2017: Indios de Mayagüez
- 2018: Capitanes de Arecibo
- 2018: Santos de San Luis
- 2018: Salta Basket
- 2018: Caciques de Humacao
- 2018: Atléticos de San Germán
- 2018: Cañeros del Este
- 2018: Fastbreak del Valle
- 2019: Indios de Mayagüez
- 2019–2021: Capitanes de Arecibo
- 2019–present: Real Estelí
- 2021: Hurricanes de San Andrés
- 2021–present: Leones de Ponce
- 2021: Fuerza Regia de Monterrey
- 2023: Cañeros del Este
- 2023: Panteras de Aguascalientes
- 2023–2024: Gladiadores de Anzoátegui
- 2026: Gambusinos de Fresnillo

Career highlights
- SPB champion (2024); SPB Finals MVP (2024); 2× Nicaraguan League champion (2020, 2021); BSN Second Team (2023); BCL Americas Top Scorer (2021)

Jezreel De Jesús (born 5 May 1991) is a Puerto Rican basketball player for Leones de Ponce of the Baloncesto Superior Nacional (BSN). He is also a member of the Puerto Rico national basketball team. De Jesús has played for several teams in Puerto Rico, and has also played in Argentina, Qatar, Venezuela, Mexico, Colombia and Nicaragua.

== Early and college career ==
De Jesús started playing basketball at age 5 in his hometown Carolina. Later, he traveled to Miami and later played for Western Oklahoma State College.

== Professional career ==
De Jesús started his career with Leones de Ponce in the Puerto Rican .

In 2015, he played with Barrancabermeja Ciudad Futuro in the Colombian League where he was named the Most Valuable Player of the season.

In the 2021 BCL Americas season, De Jesús was the top scorer of the league after averaging 20.1 points per game. On 14 April, De Jesus scored a game-high 26 points in the final of the 2021 BCL Americas. However, Estelí could not overcome Flamengo and lost the game narrowly.

== Awards and accomplishments ==
=== Club ===
Real Estelí

- 2× Liga Superior de Baloncesto: (2020, 2021)

=== Individual ===
- BCL Americas Top Scorer: (2021)
- Venezuelan League Top Scorer: (2015)
- Baloncesto Profesional Colombiano MVP: (2014)
