= Atlético Echagüe =

- Founded: 1932; 94 years ago
- Location: Paraná, Entre Ríos, Argentina

Atlético Echagüe is an Argentine professional basketball team located in Paraná, Entre Ríos. The team competes in the Liga Nacional de Básquet.

== Notable players ==
Note: Flags indicate national team eligibility at FIBA-sanctioned events. Players may hold other non-FIBA nationalities not displayed.

Criteria

To appear in this section a player must have either:

- Set a club record or won an individual award while at the club
- Played at least one official international match for their national team at any time
- Played at least one official NBA match at any time.

- (Argentina) Matias Nocedal
- (Dominican Republic) Gelvis Solano
- (Panama) Josimar Ayarza
