= 2021 Basketball Champions League Americas =

Basketball Champions League Americas
- Season: 2020–21
- Dates: 31 January – 13 April 2021
- Teams: 12

Regular season
- Season MVP: (Brazil) Rafael Hettsheimeir

Finals
- Champions: (Brazil) Flamengo (1st league title; 2nd continental title)
- Runners-up: (Nicaragua) Real Estelí
- Third place: (Brazil) Minas
- Fourth place: (Brazil) São Paulo FC

Statistical leaders
Points	(Puerto Rico) Jezreel De Jesús	20.1
Rebounds	(Panama) Ernesto Oglivie	9.7
Assists	(Argentina) Fernando Zurbriggen	6.3
Index Rating	(Argentina) Fernando Zurbriggen	21.8

The 2021 Basketball Champions League Americas season was the 14th edition of the top-tier level professional club basketball competition in the Americas and the second of the Basketball Champions League Americas (BCLA) since launched by FIBA in 2019. It was also the 22nd season of Pan-American top-level competition, as well as the 59th season of South American top-level competition.

The season began on 31 January 2021 and ended on 13 April 2021. The season ended with a Final Eight tournament that was hosted in Managua, Nicaragua. The defending champions Quimsa were eliminated in the quarter-finals.

Flamengo won its second continental championship (Note: The title was considered Flamengo's second Pan-American continental title after winning the 2014 FIBA Americas League. However, in 1953, Flamengo finished as co-champions of the South American Championship, along with two other teams.) after defeating Real Estelí in the final in Managua. As champions, Flamengo also qualified for the 2022 FIBA Intercontinental Cup.

== Team allocation ==
A total of 12 teams from 6 countries participated in the 2020–21 Basketball Champions League Americas.

=== Teams ===
League positions after eventual playoffs of the previous season shown in parentheses. Because Peñarol and Aguada from Uruguay were not able to participation due to national restrictions, Minas and Obras Sanitarias were given wild cards by FIBA. Universidad de Concepción replaced Chilean champions Valdivia, who withdrew.

Group phase
(Argentina) Quimsa^{TH} (Abd-1st)	(Argentina) Obras Sanitarias (WC)	(Brazil) São Paulo FC (3rd)	(Chile) Universidad de Concepción (WC)
(Argentina) San Lorenzo (Abd-2nd)	(Brazil) Flamengo (1st)	(Brazil) Minas (WC)	(Colombia) Titanes Barranquilla (1st)
(Argentina) Instituto (Abd-4th)	(Brazil) Franca (2nd)	(Panama) Caballos de Coclé (1st)	(Nicaragua) Real Estelí (1st)

The labels in the parentheses show how each team qualified for the place of its starting round:

- 1st, 2nd, etc.: League position after Playoffs
- Abd: Abandoned seasons due to COVID-19 pandemic
- TH: Title holders
- WC: Qualified through Wild Card

== Group phase ==
The 12 teams are drawn into four groups of three, while taking into account geographic location. In each group, teams play against each other home-and-away, in a round-robin format. The group winners and runners-up advance to the quarterfinals, while the remaining team in each group is eliminated.

=== Group A ===
Pos	Team	Pld	W	L	PF	PA	PD	Pts	Qualification
1	(Nicaragua) Real Estelí	6	4	2	456	471	−15	10	Advance to quarterfinals
2	(Panama) Caballos de Coclé	6	3	3	453	457	−4	9	Advance to quarterfinals
3	(Colombia) Titanes Barranquilla	6	2	4	485	466	+19	8	

Source: BCL Americas

=== Group B ===
Pos	Team	Pld	W	L	PF	PA	PD	Pts	Qualification
1	(Argentina) Quimsa	4	3	1	325	312	+13	7	Advance to quarterfinals
2	(Brazil) São Paulo FC	4	2	2	310	270	+40	6	Advance to quarterfinals
3	(Chile) Universidad de Concepción	4	1	3	297	350	−53	5	

Source: BCL Americas

=== Group C ===
Pos	Team	Pld	W	L	PF	PA	PD	Pts	Qualification
1	(Argentina) San Lorenzo	4	4	0	321	292	+29	8	Advance to quarterfinals
2	(Brazil) Franca	4	2	2	315	316	−1	6	Advance to quarterfinals
3	(Argentina) Obras Sanitarias	4	0	4	322	350	−28	4	

Source: BCL Americas

=== Group D ===
Pos	Team	Pld	W	L	PF	PA	PD	Pts	Qualification
1	(Brazil) Flamengo	5	5	0	413	380	+33	10	Advance to quarterfinals
2	(Brazil) Minas	6	2	4	492	494	−2	8	Advance to quarterfinals
3	(Argentina) Instituto	5	1	4	406	437	−31	6	

Source: BCL Americas

== Playoffs ==
The playoffs, also called the Final Eight, began on 10 April and ended on 13 April 2021. All games were played in the Alexis Arguello Sports Complex in the Nicaraguan capital Managua.

=== Bracket ===
Quarterfinals
10 April
(Nicaragua) Real Estelí	94
(Brazil) Franca	73
10 April
(Argentina) Quimsa	60
(Brazil) Minas	87
10 April
(Argentina) San Lorenzo	75
(Brazil) São Paulo FC	78
10 April
(Brazil) Flamengo	74
(Panama) Caballos de Coclé	59

Semifinals
11 April
(Nicaragua) Real Estelí	98
(Brazil) Minas	95
11 April
(Brazil) São Paulo FC	66
(Brazil) Flamengo	75

Final
13 April
(Nicaragua) Real Estelí	80
(Brazil) Flamengo	84
Third place game
13 April
(Brazil) Minas	75
(Brazil) São Paulo FC	58

== Awards ==
=== Most Valuable Player ===
Player	Team	Ref.
(Brazil) Rafael Hettsheimeir	(Brazil) Flamengo	

== Statistics ==
The following were the statistical leaders in the 2021 season.

=== Individual statistic leaders ===
Category	Player	Team(s)	Statistic
Efficiency per game	(Argentina) Fernando Zurbriggen	Obras Sanitarias	21.8
Points per game	(Puerto Rico) Jezreel De Jesús	Real Estelí	20.1
Rebounds per game	(Panama) Ernesto Oglivie	Caballos de Coclé	9.7
Assists per game	(Argentina) Fernando Zurbriggen	Obras Sanitarias	6.3
Steals per game	(Argentina) Mauro Cosolito	Quimsa	2.4
Blocks per game	(United States) Justin Williams	Titanes de Barranquilla	2.8
Turnovers per game	(Argentina) Selem Safar	Titanes de Barranquilla	3.0
Minutes per game	(Puerto Rico) Jonathan Rodriguez	Titanes de Barranquilla	37.4
FG%	(United States) Diamon Simpson	Quimsa	55.9%
3P%	(Peru) Juan Pablo Venegas Schaefer	Obras Sanitarias	58.3%

=== Individual game highs ===
Category	Player	Team	Statistic
Efficiency	(United States) Brandon Moss	Universidad de Concepción	34
Efficiency	(Brazil) Lucas Mariano	São Paulo FC	34
Points	(United States) Brandon Moss	Universidad de Concepción	33
Rebounds	Four occasions		16
Assists	(Brazil) George de Paula	São Paulo FC	11
Steals	(Mexico) Luke Martínez	Flamengo	5
Blocks	(United States) Brandon Moss	Universidad de Concepción	6
Three pointers	(Argentina) Santiago Scala	Franca	7
