= Real Estelí Baloncesto =

Real Estelí
- Nickname: El Tren del Norte (The Train of the North)
- Leagues: Liga Superior de Baloncesto; BCL Americas
- Founded: 2018; 8 years ago
- History: Real Estelí Baloncesto; 2018–present
- Arena: Alexis Arguello Sports Complex
- Capacity: 8,057
- Location: Managua, Nicaragua
- Team colors: Red, white
- President: Fidel Moreno
- Head coach: David Rosario
- Championships: 6 (2018–2022, 2024)
- Website: realestelifc.com/basket
Home	Away

Real Estelí Baloncesto are a Nicaraguan basketball team based in Managua. Founded in 2018, it is the basketball section of the Real Estelí FC football club, which was founded in 1959. The team entered the Liga Superior de Baloncesto (LSB) for its debut season in 2018 season.

Real Estelí's home arena is the Alexis Arguello Sports Complex, which was opened in 2017 and has a capacity of 8,057 people.

== History ==
The first game of the team in the LSB was played on 9 February 2018 against Leones de Managua.

In 2019, head coach David Rosario took over the team. Before he joined Estelí, Rosario had been the three-time Baloncesto Superior Nacional champion with Capitanes de Arecibo. In the same year, Real Estelí played in the inaugural season of the newly founded, Basketball Champions League Americas. Real reached the quarterfinals. A year later, the team won its first LSB championship after defeating Brumas de Jinotega in the playoff finals.

In April 2021, Real Estelí played in the Final Eight of the 2020–21 BCL Americas and hosted the tournament in Managua. The team managed to reach the final for the first time in club history, where it narrowly lost to Flamengo 80–84.

Real Estelí qualified for the 2021–22 BCL Americas season, which was its fourth in a row. El Tren del Norte was allotted into Group A alongside Cangrejeros de Santurce and the Edmonton Stingers.

On 3 December 2021, the club repeated as LSB champions after beating Brunas de Jinotega in the final. The following 2022 season, Real Estelí captured their fourth title.

== Honours ==
=== National ===
Liga Superior de Baloncesto

- Champions (6): 2018, 2019, 2020, 2021, 2022, 2024

Carlos Ulloa Tournament

- Champions (1): 2022

=== International ===
BCL Americas

- Runner-up (1): 2020–21

Liga Centroamericana

- Winners (1): 2018

== Players ==
=== Current roster ===
Real Estelí roster
Players
Coaches

Pos.	No.	Nat.	Name	Ht.	Age
PG	0	(Puerto Rico)	De Jesús, Jezreel	1.86 m (6 ft 1 in)	34 – 5 May 1991
SF	6	(Puerto Rico)	Matias, Angel	1.95 m (6 ft 5 in)	33 – 16 July 1992
F	7	(Nicaragua)	Pauth, Farrell	1.95 m (6 ft 5 in)	26 – 6 September 1999
F	11	(Nicaragua)	Pérez, Andy	2.00 m (6 ft 7 in)	26 – 23 September 1999
F	13	(Nicaragua)	Casildo, Bryan	1.97 m (6 ft 6 in)	19 – 5 September 2006
SG	14	(Nicaragua)	Larios, Elijah	1.90 m (6 ft 3 in)	20 – 12 January 2006
PG	15	(Nicaragua)	Reyes, Jeter	1.80 m (5 ft 11 in)	16 – 31 May 2009
C	23	(Nicaragua)	López, Bartel	2.13 m (7 ft 0 in)	36 – 27 October 1989
SG	24	(Nicaragua) (Puerto Rico)	Ruiz, Jared	1.88 m (6 ft 2 in)	33 – 14 September 1992
G	27	(Nicaragua)	Torres, Aaron	1.85 m (6 ft 1 in)	27 – 23 February 1998
G/F	29	(Nicaragua)	Garth, Francisco	1.95 m (6 ft 5 in)	26 – 14 March 1999
F/C	34	(Nicaragua)	Furgeson, Ponce	2.05 m (6 ft 9 in)	30 – 1 May 1995
SF	35	(Nicaragua)	Campbell, Jensen	1.98 m (6 ft 6 in)	27 – 17 February 1998
F/C	41	(United States)	Jefferson, Davon	2.03 m (6 ft 8 in)	39 – 3 November 1986
PG	77	(Nicaragua)	Ponce, Romario	1.80 m (5 ft 11 in)	31 – 14 January 1995

Head coach

- (Puerto Rico) David Rosario

Assistant coach(es)

- (Mexico) Giovanni Rivera
- (Paraguay) Jose Rios

Legend

- (C) Team captain
- Injured

- Roster
Updated: December 1, 2025

Pos.	Starting 5	Bench 1	Bench 2
C	Davon Jefferson	Ponce Furgeson	Bartel López
PF	Angel Matias	Jensen Campbell	Andy Pérez
SF	Fransisco Garth	Farrel Pauth	Bryan Casildo
SG	Jared Ruiz	Elijah Larios	Aaron Torres
PG	Jezreel De Jesús	Romario Ponce	Jeter Reyes

== Performance in international competitions ==
Champions Runners-up Third place Fourth place

=== Basketball Champions League Americas ===
Below are all the seasons of Real Estelí in the BCL Americas competition.

Champions Runners-up

Season	League	Result	W–L	%
2019–20	BCL Americas	Quarter-finals (lost to Instituto)	5–2	.714
2020–21	BCL Americas	Runners-up (lost to Flamengo)	6–3	.667
2021–22	BCL Americas	Quarter-finalist (lost to São Paulo)	3–4	.429
2022–23	BCL Americas	Quarter-finalist (lost to Quimsa)	4–4	.500
2023–24	BCL Americas	Quarter-finalist (lost to Quimsa)	4–5	.444
2024–25	BCL Americas	Quarter-finalist (lost to Boca Juniors)	5–3	.625
Totals		0 titles	27–21	.563

== Notable players ==
- Set a club record or won an individual award as a professional player.
- Played at least one official international match for his senior national team at any time.

Note: Flags indicate national team eligibility at FIBA-sanctioned events. Players may hold other non-FIBA nationalities not displayed.

- (Guyana) Delroy James
- (Puerto Rico) Renaldo Balkman
- (Puerto Rico) Alex Franklin
- (Puerto Rico) Javier Mojica
- (United States) Melsahn Basabe
- (United States) (Israel) D'or Fischer
