= Toros de Chiriquí =

- League: Liga Profesional de Baloncesto
- Founded: 2015
- History: Toros de Chiriquí (2015–present)
- Arena: Gimnasio Escolar de David
- Capacity: 2015
- Location: David, Chiriquí, Panama
- Head coach: Josua Chambers

Toros de Chiriquí (English: Chiriquí Bulls) is a professional basketball team based in David, Chiriquí, Panama. Established in 2015, it competes in the Liga Profesional de Baloncesto (LPB), Panama's top basketball league.

== History ==
Toros de Chiriquí was established in 2015 as one of the founding teams of Panama’s Liga Profesional de Baloncesto (LPB). In the league’s inaugural season, the club reached the championship final, where it was narrowly defeated by Correcaminos de Colón, 74–71.

In 2024, Toros de Chiriquí again advanced to the LPB finals, losing 79–65 to Correcaminos de Colón.

In the 2024 LPB season, Toros de Chiriquí finished first in the regular-season standings, and guard Guillermo Navarro was named the league’s regular-season Most Valuable Player.

The club made its international debut in the 2024–25 season of the Basketball Champions League Americas, becoming the third Panamanian team to play in the tournament after Correcaminos de Colón and Caballos de Coclé. The team did not advance past the group stage.

== Stadium ==
Toros de Chiriquí plays its home games at the Gimnasio Escolar de David in David, Chiriquí. The venue has a seating capacity of approximately 2,015 spectators.

== Notable players and coaches ==
- Michael Hicks – American forward and naturalized Panamanian national team player. Hicks led the team in scoring during their BCL Americas campaign.
- Jaime Lloreda – Veteran Panamanian center who contributed in both domestic and international games.
- Guillermo Navarro – Panamanian guard; named 2024 LPB regular-season MVP.
- Roberto Armstrong – Panamanian guard; key player on the 2024 team that reached the LPB finals.
- Ezequiel Bell – Panamanian forward who played in the 2024 season and BCL Americas.
- Josua Chambers – Head coach during the club's 2024 LPB finals run and international campaign.

== Honours ==
- Liga Profesional de Baloncesto
  - Runners-up (2): 2015, 2024
