= Ernesto Oglivie =

Panamaian basketball player

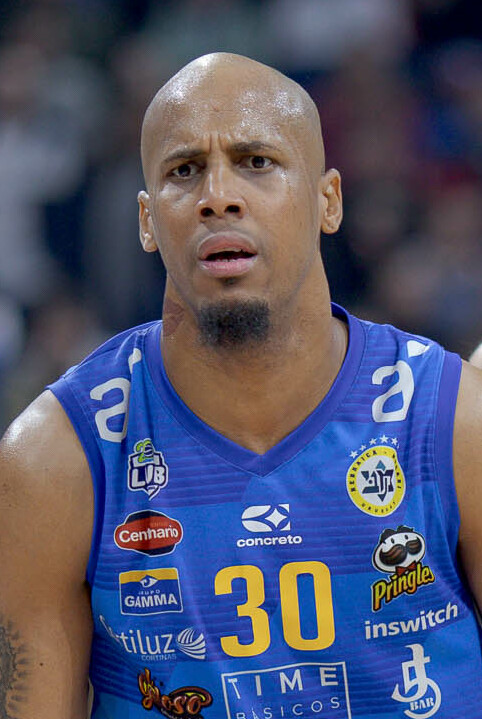

No. 30 – Hebraica Macabi
- Position: Power forward
- League: Uruguayan League

Personal information
- Born: 11 November 1992 (age 34) Panama City, Panama
- Listed height: 2.03 m (6 ft 8 in)

Career information
- College: National Technological University
- NBA draft: 2011: undrafted
- Playing career: 2006–present

Career history
- 2006–2009: Caimanes de Rio Abajo
- 2009–2010: Lechugueros de León
- 2010–2011: Santa Tecla BC
- 2011–2012: San Marcos
- 2012–2013: Maldonando
- 2013–2014: Abejas de León
- 2014–2015: Denver
- 2015–2016: Ferro Carril Oeste
- 2016–2017: Club Trouville
- 2017–2020: Capitanes de Ciudad de México
- 2020–2021: Astros de Jalisco
- 2020–2021: Titanes de Barranquilla
- 2020–2021: Caballos de Coclé
- 2021–2022: Panteras de Aguascalientes
- 2021–2022: Mineros de Zacatecas
- 2022–present: Hebraica Macabi

Career highlights
- LPB Panama MVP (2016); BCL Americas rebounding leader (2021)

Ernesto Mauro Oglivie (born 11 November 1992) is a professional Panamanian basketball player, who plays for the Hebraica Macabi of the Uruguayan League.

== Professional career ==
In the 2008–09 season he played for Lechugueros de León.

He also played for the National Technological University basketball team in Argentina.

For the 2021 Liga Nacional de Baloncesto Profesional (LNBP) season, he joined Panteras de Aguascalientes. In October 2021, he was one of five finalists for the MVP Award for the Liga Nacional de Baloncesto Profesional West Division. (The other players were Vander Blue, Michael Smith, Lucas Martínez and Karim Rodríguez) At that time, Oglivie had averaged 26:53 minutes, 15.6 points, 4.7 rebounds and 1.6 assists per game.

In 2021, Oglivie played for Caballos de Coclé in the 2021 BCL Americas season and was the league's leading rebounder with 9.7 per game.

== Panama national team ==
He has been a member of Panama's national basketball team on numerous occasions.

== Player profile ==
According to the Mexican newspaper El Heraldo de Aguascalientes, Oglivie not only contributes noteworthy stats but also considerable leadership abilities.
