= Josimar Ayarza =

Panamanian basketball player (born 1987)

Free agent
- Position: Power forward

Personal information
- Born: May 3, 1987 (age 39) Panama City, Panama
- Listed height: 6 ft 9 in (2.06 m)

Career information
- College: Cuesta College (2007–2009); Southern Miss (2009–2011)
- Playing career: 2011–present

Career history
- 2011–2013: 9 de Julio de Río Tercero
- 2013–2014: Bauru
- 2014–2015: Estudiantes Concordia
- 2015: Caballeros de Culiacán
- 2015–2016: Welcome
- 2016–2017: Atletico Echague Parana
- 2017–2021: Caballos de Coclé
- 2020–2021: Correbasket UAT
- 2021–2022: Universidad de Concepción
- 2022: Caribbean Storm Islands

Career highlights
- LPB Panama champion (2020); LPB Panama MVP (2020)

Josimar Abdiel Ayarza Tous (born May 3, 1987) is a Panamanian professional basketball player.

== Early life ==
As a collegiate freshman for Cuesta College, in March 2008, Ayarza was selected for All-Western State Conference First Team accolades after averaging 18.7 points and 8.2 rebounds. Then as a sophomore, he received first-team all-state selection from the CCCAA after averaging 16.6 points, 6.7 rebounds and 2.7 blocks.

Ayarza then signed a letter of intent to play for Southern Mississippi. He scored 410 total points for the Golden Eagles combined from 2009 to 2011.

== Professional career ==
He played for Atletico Echague Parana of the Liga Nacional de Básquet in Argentina.

== International basketball ==
He represented the Panama's national basketball team at the 2015 FIBA COCABA Championship in San José, Costa Rica, where he helped secure the gold medal.
