= Liga Profesional de Baloncesto (Panama) =

Professional basketball league in Panama

LPB Panama
- Founded: 3 June 2015; 10 years ago
- First season: 2015
- Country: Panama
- Confederation: FIBA Americas
- Number of teams: 6
- Level on pyramid: 1
- International cup: BCL Americas
- Current champions: Correcaminos de Colón (5th title) (2024)
- Most championships: Correcaminos de Colón (5 titles)
- Website: lpbpanama.com

The Liga Profesional de Baloncesto (LPB), also known as the LPB Panama, is the top professional basketball league in Panama. The league was formed in 2015 by six clubs. Correcaminos de Colón has been the most successful team in the league with four won championships.

As of the 2022 season, the league consisted of six teams.

== History ==
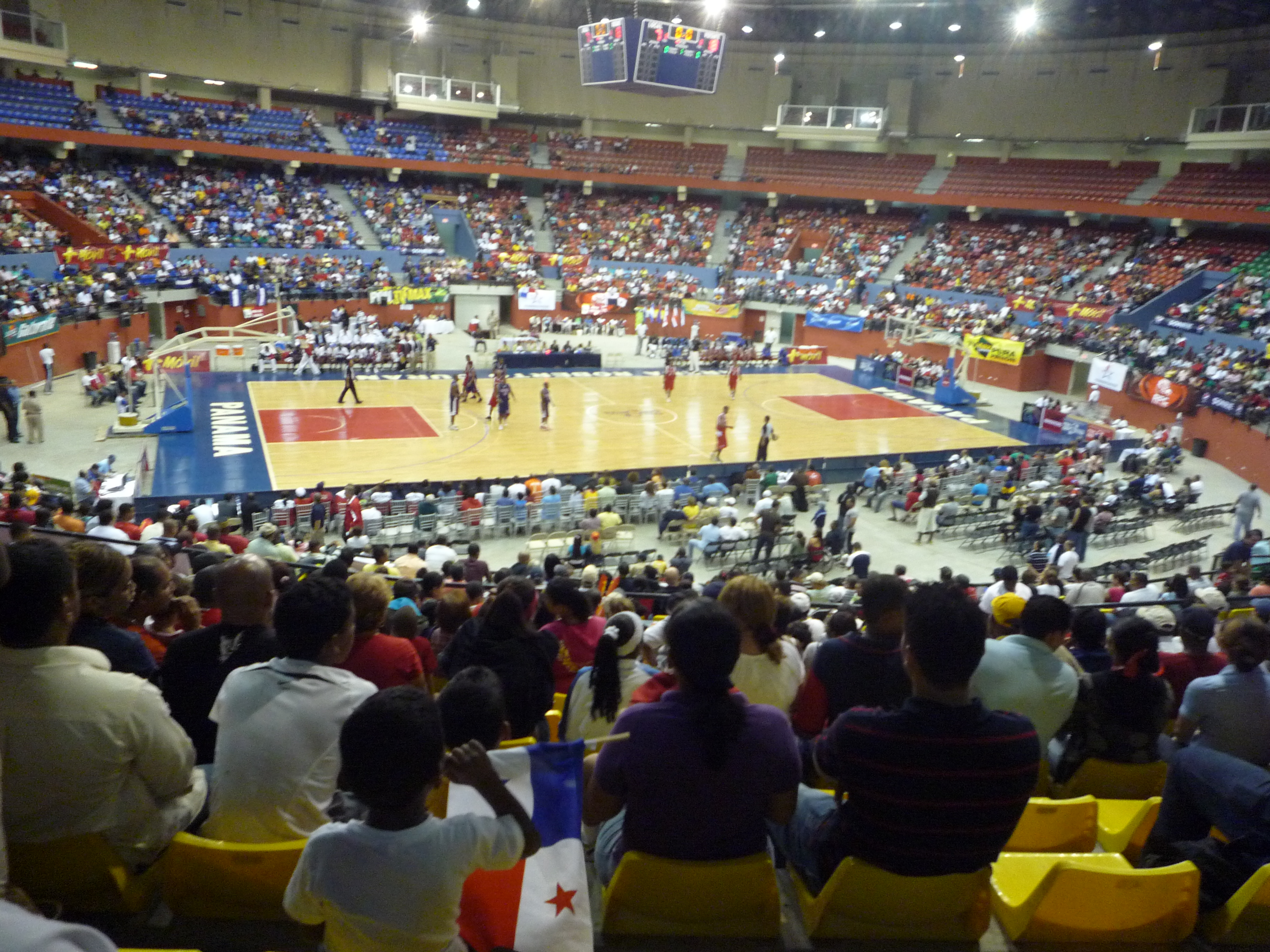
The Roberto Duran Arena hosts the finals

The league was established on June 3, 2015 by the Federación Panameña de Baloncesto (FEPABA). Six newly established clubs entered the inaugural season of the league. The first game was played on October 2, 2015, between the Águilas de Río Abajo and the Caballos de Coclé. On December 15, 2015, the Correcaminos de Colón won the first-ever league title.

In 2020, the league expanded to 7 teams with the entrance of Dragones de Don Bosco.

== Current teams ==
Team	City	Arena	Capacity	Founded	Joined
Atlético Nacional (Note: Known as Águilas de Río Abajo from 2015 to 2017.)	Panama City	Gimnasio de la USMA	5,500	2015	
Correcaminos de Colón	Colón, Panama	Arena Panamá Al Brown	3,000	2015	
Dragones de Don Bosco	Panama City	Gimnasio de la USMA	5,500	2020	
Panteras	Panama City	Gimnasio de la USMA	5,500	2015	
Scorpions de Union			2,023	2023	
Toros de Chiriquí	David, Chiriquí	Gimnasio Escolar de David	2,015	2015	

=== Timeline ===
- * – Indicates championship season

== Finals ==
Season	Champions	Runners-up	Score
2015	Correcaminos de Colón	Toros de Chiriquí	74–71
2016	Correcaminos de Colón	Caballos de Coclé	77–64
2017	Correcaminos de Colón	Caballos de Coclé	71–67
2018	Universitarios del West	Correcaminos de Colón	73–64
2019	Caballos de Coclé	Correcaminos de Colón	139–132
2020	Not played due to the COVID-19 pandemic		
2021	Correcaminos de Colón	Dragones de Don Bosco	3–0
2022	Atlético Nacional	Caballos de Coclé	3–2
2023	Not played		
2024	Correcaminos de Colón	Toros de Chiriquí	3–1

=== Performance by team ===
Club	Wins	Runners-up	Seasons won	Seasons runners-up
Correcaminos de Colón	5	1	2015, 2016, 2017, 2021, 2024	2018
Caballos de Coclé	1	3	2019	2016, 2017, 2022
Universitarios del West	1	–	2018	–
Atlético Nacional	1	–	2022	–
Toros de Chiriquí	–	2	–	2015, 2023
Dragones de Don Bosco	–	1	–	2021

== In international competitions ==
Teams for the LPB can qualify to play in pan-American competitions organised by FIBA. The champions from each season are eligible to play in the group phase of the BCL Americas, the successor of the FIBA Americas League.

Team	Competition	Seasons	Best result
Correcaminos de Colón	FIBA Americas League	2016, 2017	Quarterfinals (2017)
Caballos de Coclé	BCL Americas	2021	Quarterfinals (2021)

== Individual awards ==
=== MVP ===
Season	Player	Team	Ref.
2015	(Panama) Isaac St. Rose	Correcaminos de Colón	
2016	(Panama) Ernesto Oglivie	Halcones de Calle	
2017	(Panama) Joel Muñoz	Toros de Chiriquí	
2020	(Panama) Josimar Ayarza	Caballos de Coclé	
2021	(Panama) Pablo Rivas	Dragones de Don Bosco	
2024	(Panama) Guillermo Navarro	Toros de Chiriquí	

== Statistical leaders ==
=== Points ===
Year	Player	Team	PPG	Ref.
2015	(Panama) Joel Muñoz	Toros de Chiriquí	22.3	
2016	(Panama) Antonio Bumpus	Toros de Chiriquí	24.8	
2017	(Panama) Joel Muñoz	Toros de Chiriquí	21.7	
2018	(United States) Lovell Cook	Atlético Nacional	19.3	
2020	(Puerto Rico) Will Martinez	Universitarios del West	27.2	
2021	(Panama) Pablo Rivas	Dragones de Don Bosco	20.6	

=== Rebounds ===
Year	Player	Team	RPG	Ref.
2015	(Panama) Antonio Garcia	Caballos de Coclé	11.7	
2016	(Panama) Jaime Lloreda	Halonces de Calle	11.7	
2017	(Panama) Daniel King	Atlético Nacional	11.0	
2018	(Dominican Republic) Brayan Martinez	Panteras	14.1	
2020	(Dominican Republic) Brayan Martinez	Panteras	11.8	
2021	(Panama) Jaime Lloreda	Correcaminos de Colón	14.8	

=== Assists ===
Year	Player	Team	APG	Ref.
2015	(Panama) Joel Muñoz	Toros de Chiriquí	6.0	
2016	(Panama) Joel Muñoz	Toros de Chiriquí	7.1	
2017	(Panama) Joel Muñoz	Toros de Chiriquí	9.7	
2018	(Panama) Joel Muñoz	Toros de Chiriquí	7.3	
2020	(Panama) Joel Muñoz	Toros de Chiriquí	7.1	
2021	(Panama) Joel Muñoz	Dragones de Don Bosco	7.1	
