= Correcaminos de Colón =

Panamanian basketball club

- League: LPB Panama
- Founded: 2015
- History: Correcaminos de Colón; 2015–present
- Arena: Arena Panamá Al Brown
- Capacity: 3,000
- Location: Colón, Panama
- Team colors: Blue, Gold and White
- Championships: 4 (2015, 2016, 2017, 2021)

Correcaminos de Colón (transl. Colón Roadrunners) is a Panamaian professional basketball team located in Colón, Panama. The team competes in the Liga Panameña de Baloncesto (LPB) and plays its home games at the Arena Panamá Al Brown, which has a capacity of 3,000 people. It has won a record four titles in the LPB, the last being in 2021.

The Correcaminos have been active at the South American level too, having played in the 2016 and 2017 seasons of the FIBA Americas League. The team was proclaimed champion of the Championship of Clubs of Central America in 2016 when being first in the league.

== Honours ==
Liga Panameña de Baloncesto

- Champions (4): 2015, 2016, 2017, 2021

== Current roster ==
Note: Flags indicate national team eligibility at FIBA-sanctioned events. Players may hold other non-FIBA nationalities not displayed.

Correcaminos Colon roster
Players
Coaches

Pos.	No.	Nat.	Name
PG	2	(Panama)	Trevor Gaskins
PG	4	(Panama)	Anibal Salazar
PF	12	(Panama)	David Tait
F	13	(United States)	Tyler Gaskins
SG	15	(Panama)	Isaac St.Rose
C	17	(Panama)	Joel Tesis
G/F	21	(Panama)	Darrell St.Rose
C	23	(Nicaragua)	Bartel Lopez
G/F	24	(Panama)	Manuel Barnes
SF	27	(Panama)	Eduardo Isaac
	28	(Panama)	Alex Mendoza
PF	29	(Panama)	Josimar Stewart
C	32	(United States)	Ronald Farmer-Blanchard
SF		(United States)	Adrian Rodgers
C		(United Kingdom)	Dylan Johns
G/F		(United States)	Chris Hill

Head coach

(Panama) Casimiro Laguna

Legend

- (C) Team captain
- Injured

- Roster
Updated: 28 December 2017

=== Notable players ===
Note: Flags indicate national team eligibility at FIBA-sanctioned events. Players may hold other non-FIBA nationalities not displayed.

Criteria

To appear in this section a player must have either:

- Set a club record or won an individual award while at the club
- Played at least one official international match for their national team at any time
- Played at least one official NBA match at any time.

- (Panama) Trevor Gaskins
- (Panama) Ernesto Oglivie
- (Puerto Rico) Alexander Galindo
- (United States) Tyler Gaskins

== Head coaches ==
- (Uruguay) (Italy) Marcelo Signorelli
