= Caballos de Coclé =

- League: LPB
- Founded: 2015
- Arena: Gimnasio Municipal de Aguadulce Durán
- Capacity: 900
- Location: Aguadulce, Coclé, Panama
- President: Carlos Lee
- Head coach: Flor Meléndez
- Championships: 1 Panamanian League

Caballos de Coclé (in English: Coclé Horses) is a Panamanian basketball club based in Aguadulce in the Coclé Province. The team plays in the Liga Profesional de Baloncesto (LPB). The home arena of the team is the Gymnasio Municipal de Aguadulce. The Caballos has won one LPB championship, in 2019.

The Cablalos made their debut in international competition during the 2017 FIBA Americas League, finishing third in Group B. The club played in the 2020–21 season of the BCL Americas and reached the quarterfinals. Home games were played in Panama City in the Roberto Durán Arena.

== Honours ==
Liga Profesional de Baloncesto

- Champions (1): 2019
  - Runners-up (3): 2016, 2017, 2022

== Players ==
=== Current roster ===
Note: Flags indicate national team eligibility at FIBA-sanctioned events. Players may hold other non-FIBA nationalities not displayed.

Caballos de Coclé roster
Players
Coaches

Pos.	No.	Nat.	Name	Ht.
PG	2	(Panama)	Andrés Vergara	1.80 m (5 ft 11 in)
PF	3	(Panama)	Josimar Ayarza	2.05 m (6 ft 9 in)
C	5	(Panama)	Jaime Lloreda	2.06 m (6 ft 9 in)
PG	10	(Panama)	José Montenegro	1.90 m (6 ft 3 in)
F	11	(Panama)	Ernesto Oglivie	2.00 m (6 ft 7 in)
F/C	12	(Panama)	Orlando Ortega	2.00 m (6 ft 7 in)
G	13	(Panama)	Bryan Waithe	1.88 m (6 ft 2 in)
C	15	(Panama)	Aldimir Castillo	2.03 m (6 ft 8 in)
SG	19	(Panama)	Joshua Chambers	1.80 m (5 ft 11 in)
G/F	23	(Panama)	Michael Hicks	1.96 m (6 ft 5 in)
F/C	26	(Panama)	Damar Wilson	2.03 m (6 ft 8 in)
F	27	(Panama)	Gil Atencio	2.00 m (6 ft 7 in)
PG	55	(Panama)	Carlos Rodríguez	1.88 m (6 ft 2 in)

Head coach

- (Puerto Rico) Flor Meléndez

Legend

- (C) Team captain
- Injured
