= List of basketball champions of the Americas =

Overview of continental men's basketball champions in the Americas

The continental championship for men's basketball teams based in the Americas, a landmass that includes North America and South America, has been played since 1993. From 1946 to 1992, a competition for South American teams was run by FIBA. Historically, different leagues have been organised to determine the continental champions of the American continents. Currently, the Basketball Champions League Americas is the official first-level league.

Teams from the highest level of basketball in the United States, the National Basketball Association (NBA), do not participate in FIBA competitions. Although this league is widely accepted to be of a higher level, FIBA still awards the continental championship title to the BCLA winners.

== Competitions ==
Competitions historically considered as the first-level continental league
Timespan	League	Note(s)
1946-1992	Campeonato Sudamericano de Clubes Campeones de Básquetbol	The league was exclusively for teams from Latin America. The competition continued as the continental second-tier level until 1996, and later as the third-tier level until 2008.
1993-2000	Campeonato Panamericano de Clubes de Básquetbol	
2000-2007	Liga Sudamericana de Básquetbol (LSB)	The league was exclusively for teams from Latin America. The LSB was the second-tier league between 1996 and 2000, and still is since 2008.
2007-2019	FIBA Americas League	
2019–present	Basketball Champions League Americas (BCLA)	

== List of champions ==
From 1946 to 1992, the South American champions are listed in the absence of a FIBA-ran competition for Northern American teams.

Ed.	Pan-American ed.	Year	First place game		Third place game		Num. teams	Ref.
Ed.	Pan-American ed.	Year	Winners	Runners-up	Third place	Fourth place	Num. teams	Ref.
1	–	1946	(Uruguay) Olimpia Montevideo	(Argentina) Gimnasia y Esgrima (VdP)	–		2	
2	–	1953	(Paraguay) Olimpia (Brazil) Flamengo (Argentina) Provincia de Santa Fe selection	(Chile) Club Deportivo Palestino (Uruguay) Paysandu				
3	–	1956	Sporting Club Uruguay	(Argentina) Ateneo de la Juventud				
4	–	1958	(Uruguay) Defensor Sporting	(Argentina) San Lorenzo	(Colombia) Selección Valley del Cauca	(Ecuador) LDU Quito	7	
5	–	1961	(Brazil) Sírio	(Paraguay) Olimpia				
6	–	1965	(Brazil) Corinthians	(Uruguay) Tabaré				
7	–	1966	(Brazil) Corinthians	(Ecuador) L.D. Estudantil	Two teams from Argentina and Uruguay withdrew		2	
8	–	1967	(Chile) Thomas Bata	(Uruguay) Welcome				
9	–	1968	(Brazil) Sírio	(Uruguay) Welcome				
10	–	1969	(Brazil) Corinthians	(Ecuador) L.D. Estudantil				
11	–	1970	(Brazil) Sírio	(Uruguay) Atenas				
12	–	1971	(Brazil) Sírio	(Chile) Sportiva Italiana				
13	–	1972	(Brazil) Sírio	(Uruguay) Olimpia				
14	–	1974	(Brazil) Franca	(Uruguay) CA Peñarol				
15	–	1975	(Brazil) Franca	(Argentina) Obras Sanitarias				
16	–	1977	(Brazil) Franca	(Brazil) Palmeiras				
17	–	1978	(Brazil) Sírio	(Brazil) Franca				
18	–	1979	(Brazil) Sírio	(Venezuela) Guaiqueríes de Margarita				
19	–	1980	(Brazil) Franca	(Brazil) Sírio				
20	–	1981	(Argentina) Ferro C. Oeste	(Brazil) São José dos Campos			7	
21	–	1982	(Argentina) Ferro C. Oeste	(Argentina) Obras Sanitarias				
22	–	1983	(Uruguay) Peñarol	(Brazil) Monte Líbano			6	
23	–	1984	(Brazil) Sírio	(Argentina) River Plate				
24	–	1985	(Brazil) Monte Líbano	(Argentina) San Andrés				
25	–	1986	(Brazil) Monte Líbano	(Argentina) Ferro C. Oeste				
26	–	1987	(Argentina) Ferro C. Oeste	(Brazil) Monte Líbano				
27	–	1988	(Venezuela) Trotamundos	(Argentina) Atenas				
28	–	1989	(Venezuela) Trotamundos	(Uruguay) Biguá				
29	–	1990	(Brazil) Franca	(Ecuador) San Pedro Pascual				
30	–	1991	(Brazil) Franca	(Argentina) Atenas				
31	–	1992	(Uruguay) Biguá	(Brazil) Franca				
Campeonato Panamericano de Clubes de Básquetbol
32	1	1993	(Brazil) Franca	(Argentina) Atenas	(Mexico) Indios de Ciudad Juárez	(Ecuador) Adidas		
33	2	1994	(Brazil) Franca	(Argentina) Olimpia de Venado Tuerto	(Brazil) União Corinthians	(Argentina) Atenas		
34	3	1995	(Brazil) Rio Claro	(Argentina) Peñarol Mar del Plata	(Brazil) União Corinthians	(Brazil) Franca		
35	4	1996	(Argentina) Atenas	(Brazil) Franca	(Brazil) Dharma/Yara Franca	(Argentina) Independiente de General Pico		
36	5	1997	(Brazil) Franca	(Argentina) Atenas	(Argentina) Independiente de General Pico	(Brazil) Mogi das Cruzes		
37	6	1998	Cancelled due to the 1999 Pacific hurricane season					
38	7	1999	(Brazil) Franca	(Brazil) Vasco da Gama	(Dominican Republic) Mauricio Baez	(Argentina) Independiente de General Pico		
39	8	2000	(Argentina) Estudiantes de Olavarría	(Uruguay) Aguada	(Uruguay) Atlético Welcome	(Brazil) Marathon Franca		
Liga Sudamericana de Básquetbol (LSB)
40	– (Note: The Liga Sudamericana de Basquetebol officially was a league opened for teams from South America. In the 2001 season, however, the NBDL Ambassadors of the United States participated.)	2001	(Argentina) Estudiantes de Olavarría	(Argentina) GECR	(Argentina) Atenas	(Brazil) Flamengo	16	
41	–	2002	(Argentina) Libertad de Sunchales	(Brazil) Vasco da Gama	(Venezuela) Cocodrilos de Caracas	(Argentina) Estudiantes de Olavarría	16	
42	–	2004	(Argentina) Atenas	(Brazil) Unitri Uberlândia	(Argentina) Boca Juniors	(Argentina) Libertad	16	
43	–	2005	(Brazil) Uberlândia	(Brazil) Universo Ajax	(Argentina) Boca Juniors	(Venezuela) Cocodrilos de Caracas	16	
44	–	2006	(Argentina) Ben Hur	(Brazil) COC Ribeirão Preto	(Brazil) Unitri Uberlândia	(Argentina) Libertad	16	
45	–	2007	(Argentina) Libertad de Sunchales	(Brazil) Unimed Franca	(Argentina) Ben Hur	(Argentina) GECR	16	
FIBA Americas League								
46	9	2007–08	(Argentina) Peñarol	(Mexico) Soles de Mexicali	(United States) Miami Tropics	(Brazil) Minas		
47	10	2008–09	(Brazil) Brasília	(Mexico) Halcones UV Xalapa	(Uruguay) Biguá	(Brazil) Minas		
48	11	2009–10	(Argentina) Peñarol	(Venezuela) Espartanos de Margarita	(Mexico) Halcones UV Xalapa	(Argentina) Quimsa		
49	12	2010–11	(Argentina) Regatas Corrientes	(Puerto Rico) Capitanes de Arecibo	(Mexico) Halcones UV Xalapa	(Mexico) Halcones Rojos		
50	13	2012	(Mexico) Pioneros de Quintana Roo	(Argentina) La Unión	(Argentina) Obras Sanitarias	(Brazil) Brasília		
51	14	2013	(Brazil) Pinheiros	(Argentina) Lanús	(Puerto Rico) Capitanes de Arecibo	(Brazil) Brasília		
52	15	2014	(Brazil) Flamengo	(Brazil) Pinheiros	(Uruguay) Aguada	(Mexico) Halcones UV Xalapa		
53	16	2015	(Brazil) Bauru	(Mexico) Pioneros de Quintana Roo	(Brazil) Flamengo	(Argentina) Peñarol		
54	17	2016	(Venezuela) Guaros de Lara	(Brazil) Bauru	(Brazil) Mogi das Cruzes	(Brazil) Flamengo		
55	18	2017	(Venezuela) Guaros de Lara	(Argentina) Weber Bahía Blanca	(Puerto Rico) Leones de Ponce	(Mexico) Fuerza Regia		
56	19	2018	(Argentina) San Lorenzo	(Brazil) Mogi das Cruzes	(Argentina) Regatas Corrientes	(Argentina) Estudiantes Concordia		
57	20	2019	(Argentina) San Lorenzo	(Venezuela) Guaros de Lara	(Brazil) Paulistano	(Mexico) Capitanes de la Ciudad de México		
Basketball Champions League Americas (BCLA)
58	21	2019–20	(Argentina) Quimsa	(Brazil) Flamengo	(Argentina) Instituto and (Argentina) San Lorenzo (Note: There was no third place game in the 2019-20 season, teams are listed in alphabetical order.)		12	
59	22	2021	(Brazil) Flamengo	(Nicaragua) Real Estelí	(Brazil) Minas	(Brazil) São Paulo	12	
60	23	2021–22	(Brazil) São Paulo	(Uruguay) Biguá	(Brazil) Minas	(Argentina) Quimsa	12	
61	24	2022–23	(Brazil) Franca	(Brazil) Flamengo	(Brazil) Minas	(Argentina) Quimsa	12	
62	25	2023–24	(Argentina) Quimsa	(Brazil) Flamengo	(Mexico) Halcones de Xalapa	(Uruguay) Hebraica Macabi	12	
63	26	2024–25	(Brazil) Flamengo	(Argentina) Boca Juniors	(Brazil) Franca	(Argentina) Instituto	12	
64	27	2025–26	(Argentina) Boca Juniors	(Brazil) Franca	(Uruguay) Nacional	(Brazil) Flamengo	12	

== Performance by club ==
The listing includes South American championships from 1946 to 1992 and from 2001 to 2007, as there was no competition for teams from North and Central America.

There are 27 teams who have won the continental championship. Two clubs have won three championships in a row: Sírio (1970-1972) and Franca (1974-1977). Twelve teams have won two consecutive titles.

Club	Titles	Runners-up	Seasons won	Seasons runner-up
(Brazil) Franca	10	4	1974, 1975, 1977, 1980, 1990, 1993, 1994, 1997, 1999, 2022–23	1978, 1992, 1996, 2025–26
(Brazil) Sirio	8	1	1961, 1968, 1970, 1971, 1972, 1978, 1979, 1984	1980
(Brazil) Flamengo	4	2	1953*, 2014, 2021, 2024–25	2019–20, 2022–23
(Argentina) Ferro Carril Oeste	3	1	1981, 1982, 1987	1986
(Argentina) Atenas de Cordoba	2	4	1996, 2004	1988, 1991, 1993, 1997
(Brazil) Monte Libano	2	2	1985, 1986	1983, 1987
(Argentina) San Lorenzo	2	1	2018, 2019	1958**
(Argentina) Peñarol Mar del Plata	2	1	2007–08, 2009–10	1995
(Venezuela) Guaros de Lara	2	1	2016, 2017	2019
(Argentina) Quimsa	2	0	2019–20, 2023–24	—
(Brazil) Corinthians	2	0	1965, 1966	—
(Uruguay) Defensor Sporting	2	0	1956, 1958	—
(Venezuela) Trotamundos	2	0	1988, 1989	
(Argentina) Estudiantes de Olavarría	2	0	2000, 2001	—
(Argentina) Libertad de Sunchales	2	0	2002, 2007	—
(Uruguay) Biguá	1	2	1992	1989, 2021–22
(Uruguay) Olimpia Montevideo	1	1	1946	1972
(Paraguay) Olimpia	1	1	1953*	1961
(Uruguay) Peñarol Montevideo	1	1	1983	1974
(Brazil) Bauru	1	1	2015	2016
(Brazil) Uberlândia	1	1	2005	2004
(Mexico) Pioneros de Quintana Roo	1	1	2012	2015
(Brazil) Pinheiros	1	1	2013	2014
(Argentina) Boca Juniors	1	1	2025–26	2024–25
(Argentina) Provincia de Santa Fé	1	0	1953*	—
(Chile) Thomas Bata	1	0	1967	—
(Brazil) Rio Claro	1	0	1995	—
(Brazil) Brasília	1	0	2008–09	—
(Argentina) Ben Hur	1	0	2006	—
(Argentina) Regatas Corrientes	1	0	2010–11	—
(Brazil) São Paulo	1	0	2021–22	—
(Ecuador) Estudantil	0	2	—	1966, 1969
(Uruguay) Welcome	0	2	—	1967, 1968
(Argentina) Obras Sanitarias	0	2	—	1975, 1982
(Brazil) Vasco da Gama	0	2	—	1999, 2002
(Argentina) Gimnasia y Esgrima	0	1	—	1946
(Chile) Palestino	0	1	—	1953*
(Argentina) Ateneo de la Juventud	0	1	—	1956
(Colombia) Valle del Cauca	0	1	—	1958**
(Uruguay) Tabaré	0	1	—	1965
(Uruguay) Atenas de San Carlos	0	1	—	1970
(Chile) Sportiva Italiana	0	1	—	1971
(Brazil) Palmeiras	0	1	—	1977
(Venezuela) Guaiqueríes de Margarita	0	1	—	1979
(Brazil) São José dos Campos	0	1	—	1981
(Ecuador) San Pedro Pascual	0	1	—	1990
(Argentina) Olimpia de Venado Tuerto	0	1	—	1994
(Uruguay) Aguada	0	1	—	2000
(Argentina) GE Comodoro Rivadavia	0	1	—	2001
(Brazil) Universo/Goiânia	0	1	—	2005
(Brazil) COC Ribeirão Preto	0	1	—	2006
(Mexico) Soles de Mexicali	0	1	—	2007–08
(Mexico) Halcones de Xalapa	0	1	—	2008–09
(Venezuela) Espartanos de Margarita	0	1	—	2009–10
(Puerto Rico) Capitanes de Arecibo	0	1	—	2010–11
(Argentina) La Unión	0	1	—	2012
(Argentina) Lanús	0	1	—	2013
(Argentina) Estudiantes de Bahía Blanca	0	1	—	2017
(Brazil) Mogi das Cruzes	0	1	—	2018
(Nicaragua) Real Estelí	0	1	—	2021

* The 1953 edition had three joint winners and two joint runners-up.

** The 1958 season had two joint runners-up, both San Lorenzo and Selleción Valley del Cauca.

== Performance by country ==
Club	Titles	Runners-up
Brazil	32	19
Argentina	19	17
Uruguay	5	9
Venezuela	4	3
Mexico	1	3
Chile	1	2
Paraguay	1	1
Ecuador	0	3
Colombia	0	1
Nicaragua	0	1
Puerto Rico	0	1
