= Santiago Scala =

Argentine basketball player (born 1991)

No. 6 – Diablos Rojos del México
- Position: Point guard
- League: Liga Nacional de Básquet

Personal information
- Born: 6 February 1991 (age 35) Junín, Buenos Aires, Argentina
- Listed height: 1.87 m (6 ft 2 in)

Career information
- Playing career: 2008–present

Career history
- 2008–2011: Argentino (Junín)
- 2011–2015: Gimnasia y Esgrima (Comodoro Rivadavia)
- 2015–2016: Regatas Corrientes
- 2016–2017: San Lorenzo de Almagro
- 2017–2021: Instituto
- 2021–2024: Franca
- 2024: Diablos Rojos del México
- 2025–2026: Boca Juniors
- 2026–present: Diablos Rojos del México

Career highlights
- FIBA Intercontinental Cup champion (2023); 2× Champions League America champion (2023, 2026); 2× LNB champion (2017, 2025); La Liga Argentina champion (2010); Torneo Súper 4 champion (2017); 2× Supercopa de La Liga champion (2022, 2024); Copa Súper 20 champion (2025); 3× NBB champion (2022, 2023, 2024); LNBP champion (2024); LNB Sixth Man of the Year (2015); NBB Sixth Man of the Year (2023)
Medals
Men's basketball
Representing Argentina
Pan American Games
Gold medal – first place	2023 Santiago

Santiago Nicolás Scala (born 6 February 1991) is an Argentine basketball player for Diablos Rojos del México of the Liga Nacional de Baloncesto Profesional (LNBP). At a height of 1.87 metres (6 feet 2 inches) tall, he plays at the point guard position.

== Professional career ==
=== Argentino de Junín ===
Scala began his professional career at Argentino de Junín, a club in his hometown. His first two seasons with the Buenos Aires team were in the Torneo Nacional de Ascenso, the second division of Argentine basketball. After becoming champions in 2010, Argentino de Junín was promoted to the LNB, which allowed Scala to show that he could play in the top category. The following season however, his team was relegated from the LNB.

=== Gimnasia Indalo ===
In 2011, Scala was signed by the Chubut-based club Gimnasia Indalo with a contract for two seasons. At the end of those seasons, he renewed for two more seasons. In the 2014–2015 season he reached the LNB finals for the first time in his career, losing to Quimsa.

=== Regatas Corrientes and San Lorenzo ===
After leaving Gimnasia, Scala signed with Regatas Corrientes. After a year, he signed with San Lorenzo de Almagro. In his new club, he won the title in the Torneo Súper 4 and the LNB championship, after defeating Regatas Corrientes in the final.

=== Instituto ===
In July 2017, Scala signed with Instituto, spending four seasons with the team.

=== Franca ===
In June 2021, Scala announced that he would leave Instituto to play for Sesi/Franca, a team in the NBB. With this team, he won the 2022–23 Champions League Americas and the 2023 FIBA Intercontinental Cup.

=== Diablos Rojos and Boca Juniors ===
In 2024, Scala played in the Liga Nacional de Baloncesto Profesional (LNBP) with the Diablos Rojos, in which he was crowned champion.

In December 2024, Scala signed a contract with Boca Juniors for the 2024–25 Liga Nacional de Básquet season. On 17 January 2025, he won the 2024 Liga Supercopa title. On 4 March 2025, he won the 2025 Copa Súper 20 against his former team, Instituto de Córdoba. On 20 July 2025, he won the Liga Nacional title, scoring the decisive three-pointer in the seventh game of the finals, again against Instituto. On 18 April 2026, he won the Basketball Champions League Americas after defeating Franca 86–72. On 6 June, Scala and the club announced that he would not be part of the roster for the following season.

In June 2026, Diablos Rojos announced the return of Scala in preparation for the 2026 LNBP season.

== National team career ==
Scala won the 2007 South American Cadet Championship together with the Argentine team, being captain of the team and chosen as the MVP of the tournament. In 2008, he was part of the team that participated in the Albert Schweitzer Tournament that took place in Germany where the Argentine U18 team finished in sixth place.

Scala was part of the Argentine team that won the gold medal in the men's basketball tournament at the 2023 Pan American Games.
