= Luciano González (basketball) =

Argentine basketball player

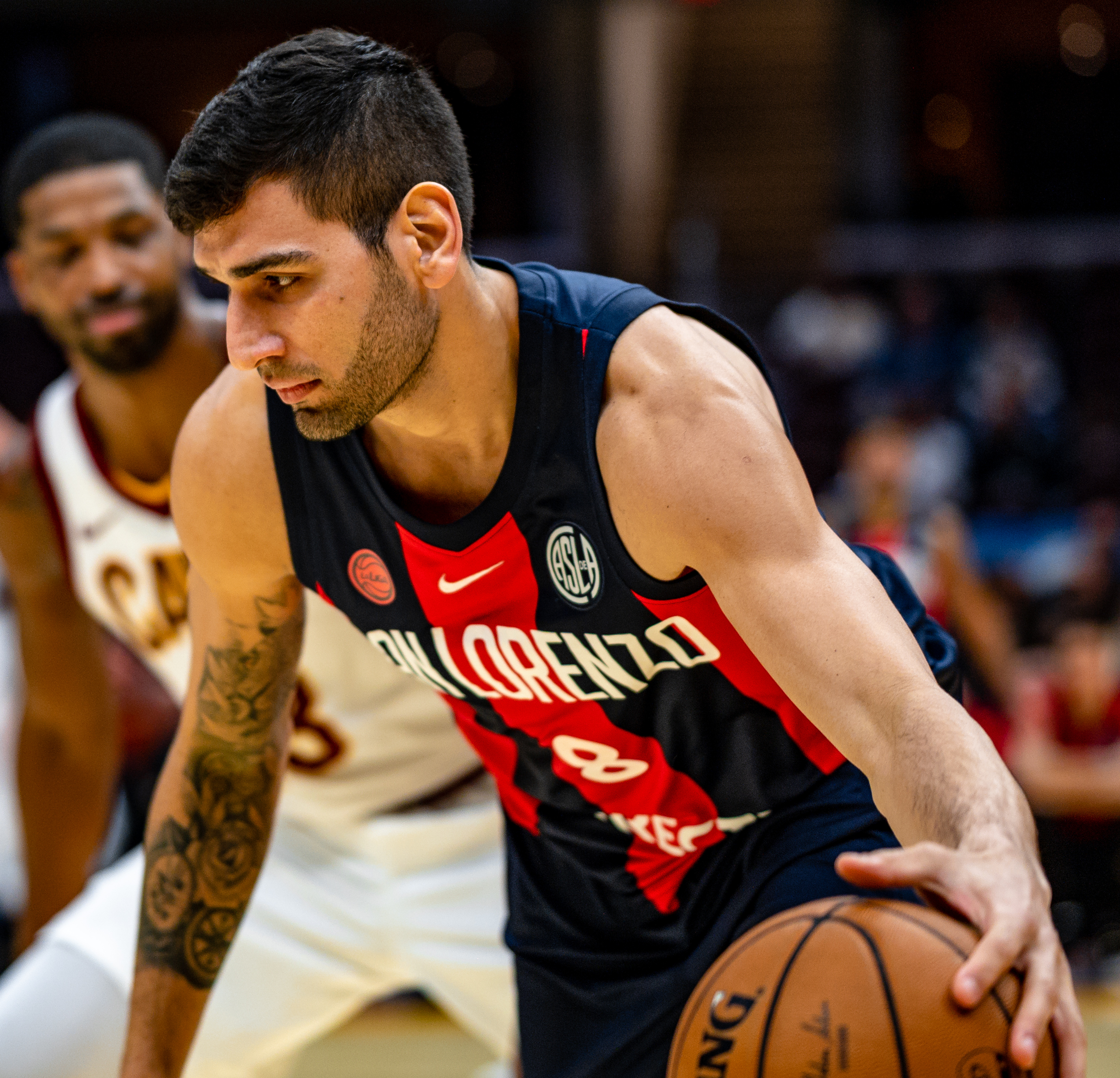
- González with San Lorenzo in 2019

No. 3 – Gambusinos de Fresnillo
- Position: Shooting guard
- League: Liga Nacional de Baloncesto Profesional

Personal information
- Born: 1 January 1990 (age 36) Entre Rios, Argentina
- Listed height: 188 cm (6 ft 2 in)
- Listed weight: 78 kg (172 lb)

Career information
- Playing career: 2008–present

Career history
- 2008–2009: Atlético Echagüe
- 2009–2010: Club San Martin
- 2010–2011: Obras Sanitarias
- 2011–2012: Minas Tênis Clube
- 2012–2013: Juventud Sionista
- 2013–2014: La Unión
- 2014–2016: Atenas Córdoba
- 2016–2017: Quimsa
- 2017–2019: Instituto
- 2019–2020: San Lorenzo
- 2020–2021: Flamengo
- 2021: Quimsa
- 2021–2023: Instituto
- 2023: Trotamundos
- 2023–2024: Minas
- 2024–2025: Diablos Rojos del México
- 2026–present: Gambusinos de Fresnillo

Luciano "Chuzito" González (born 1 January 1990) is an Argentine basketball player for Diablos Rojos del México of the Liga Nacional de Baloncesto Profesional (LNBP). Standing at 188 cm (6 ft 2 in), he plays as shooting guard.

== Professional career ==
On 13 July 2019, González was announced by defending Argentine champions San Lorenzo. On 13 March, he scored 14 points in a quarterfinal win over Quimsa in the BCL Americas.

On 10 July 2020, González signed with Flamengo in Brazil.

== National team career ==
In 2011, González made his debut for the Argentine national basketball team.
