= 2026 Basketball Champions League Americas Final =

2026 BCL Americas Final
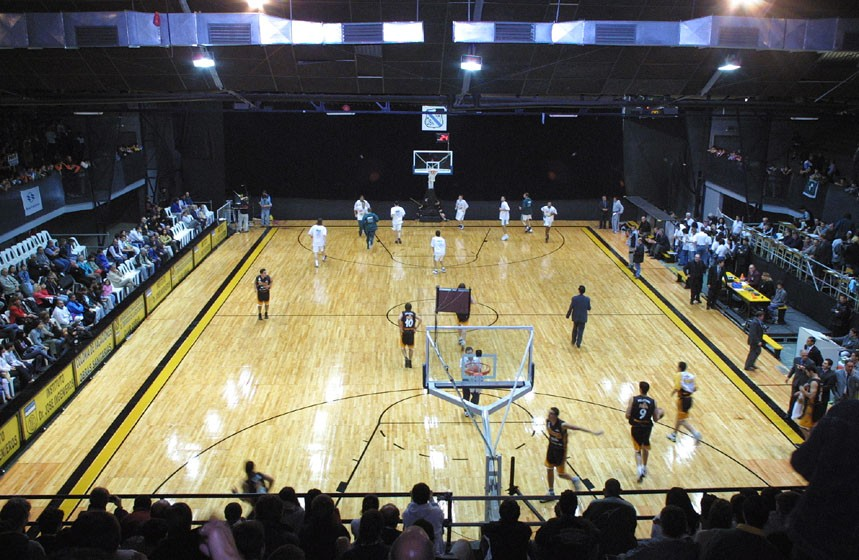
- The Estadio Obras Sanitarias hosted the Final.
- Event: 2025–26 BCL Americas
Boca Juniors	Sesi Franca
(Argentina)	(Brazil)
(7–2)	(7–3)
86	72
Head coach: Nicolas Casalanguida	Head coach: Helinho Rubens
	1	2	3	4	Total
Boca Juniors	31	16	19	20	86
Sesi Franca	28	10	15	19	72
- Date: 18 April 2026
- Venue: Estadio Obras Sanitarias, Buenos Aires
- MVP: Francisco Cáffaro
- Referees: Roberto Vázquez (PUR), Julio Anaya (PAN), Carlos Peralta (ECU)

The 2026 BCL Americas Final was the final game of the 2025–26 Basketball Champions League Americas, the seventh season of the league under its new entity and the 19th of the Pan-American premier basketball league organised by FIBA. It was played at the Estadio Obras Sanitarias in Buenos Aires] on 18 April 2026. The game was played between Brazilian club Sesi Franca and the Argentinean club Boca Juniors.

Boca Juniors won its first continental title and also they qualified for 2026 FIBA Intercontinental Cup. Francisco Cáffaro was the team's key player and won the league's MVP award.

== Teams ==
In the following table, finals until 2020 were in the FIBA Americas League and South American Championship eras.

Team	Previous final appearances (bold indicates winners)
(Argentina) Boca Juniors	2025
(Brazil) Sesi Franca	14 (**1974**, **1975**, **1977**, 1978, **1980**, **1990**, **1991**, 1992, **1993**, **1994**, 1996, **1997**, **1999**, **2023**)

== Road to the final ==
- (H): Home game
- (A): Away game
- (N): Neutral venue

(Argentina) Boca Juniors					Round	(Brazil) Sesi Franca				
Opponent	Result				Group phase	Opponent	Result			
(Uruguay) Aguada	88–71 (Paysandú)				Gameday 1	(Argentina) Instituto	89–93 (OT) (Concepción)			
(Brazil) KTO Minas	61–80 (Paysandú)				Gameday 2	(Chile) Universidad de Concepción	85–79 (Concepción)			
(Brazil) KTO Minas	92–77 (H)				Gameday 3	(Chile) Universidad de Concepción	120–62 (H)			
(Uruguay) Aguada	84–88 (H)				Gameday 4	(Argentina) Instituto	110–80 (H)			
(Uruguay) Aguada	101–54 (Belo Horizonte)				Gameday 5	(Argentina) Instituto	89–68 (Córdoba)			
(Brazil) KTO Minas	77–67 (Belo Horizonte)				Gameday 6	(Chile) Universidad de Concepción	79–80 (Córdoba)			
**Group B first place**: Pos / Team / Pld / Pts; **1** / (Argentina) Boca Juniors / **6** / **10**; 2 / (Brazil) KTO Minas / 6 / **10**; 3 / (Uruguay) Aguada / 6 / **7**; Updated to match(es) played on unknown. Source:					Group phase	**Group D first place**: Pos / Team / Pld / Pts; **1** / (Brazil) Sesi Franca / **6** / **10**; 2 / (Argentina) Instituto / 6 / **10**; 3 / (Chile) Universidad de Concepción / 6 / **7**; Updated to match(es) played on unknown. Source:				
Opponent	Series	Game 1	Game 2	Game 3	Playoffs	Opponent	Series	Game 1	Game 2	Game 3
(Argentina) Instituto	2–0	90–74 (A)	75–68 (H)	–	Quarterfinals	(Brazil) KTO Minas	2–1	98–90 (A)	101–110 (H)	103–91 (H)
(Brazil) Flamengo	81–58 (H)				Semifinals	(Uruguay) Nacional	83–71 (N)			

== Game details ==
18 April 2025	**Boca Juniors** (Argentina)	**86**–72	(Brazil) Sesi Franca	Buenos Aires, Argentina
21:40	Scoring by quarter: **31**–28, **16**–10, **19**–15, **20**–19
	Pts: Scala 18; Rebs: Scala 6 Asts: Scala 5	Boxscore	Pts: Lucas 17; Rebs: Lucas 7 Asts: Georginho 5	Arena: Estadio Obras Sanitarias; Referees: Roberto Vázquez (PUR), Julio Anaya (PAN), Carlos Peralta (ECU)

2024 BCL Americas champions

**Boca Juniors**
1st league title
1st continental title
