= Nathan Hoover =

American basketball player (born 1997)

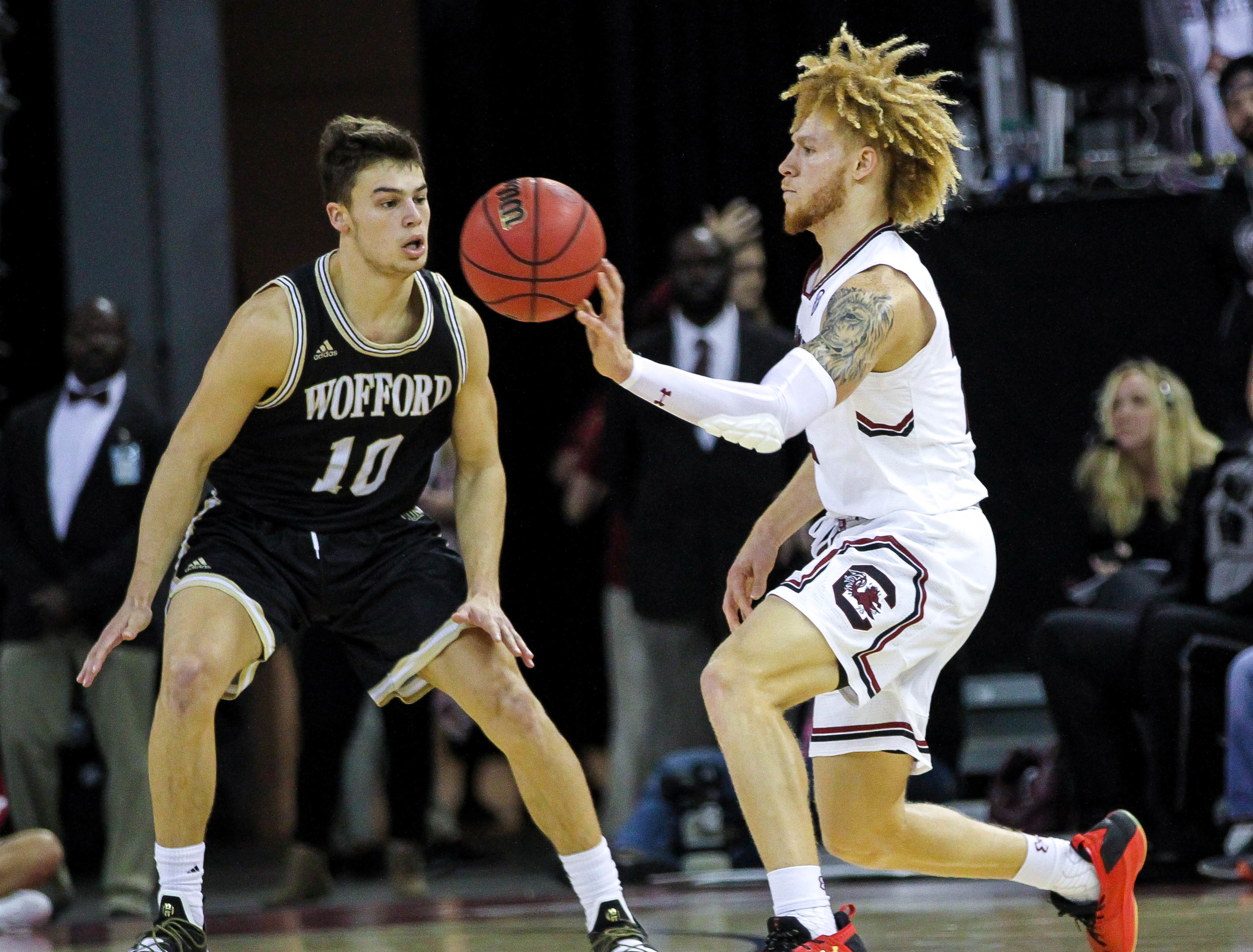
- Hoover (10) playing for Wofford

No. 10 – Club Melilla Baloncesto
- Position: Shooting guard
- League: Primera FEB

Personal information
- Born: May 24, 1997 (age 29)
- Listed height: 6 ft 4 in (1.93 m)
- Listed weight: 185 lb (84 kg)

Career information
- High school: Arlington (Arlington, Tennessee)
- College: Wofford (2016–2020)
- NBA draft: 2020: undrafted
- Playing career: 2021–present

Career history
- 2021–2022: Borisfen
- 2022–2023: Juaristi ISB
- 2023–2024: Instituto
- 2024: Real Valladolid
- 2025: Panteras de Aguascalientes
- 2025–2026: Club Atlético Peñarol
- 2026–present: Club Melilla Baloncesto

Career highlights
- FIBA South American League champion (2023); FIBA South American League MVP (2023); Second-team All-SoCon (2020); SoCon All-Freshman Team (2017)

Nathan Hoover (born May 24, 1997) is an American professional basketball player for Club Melilla Baloncesto of the Spanish Primera FEB. He played college basketball for Wofford.

== High school career ==
Hoover grew up in Memphis, Tennessee. He attended Arlington High School, where he averaged 15 points per game as a sophomore. Hoover averaged more than 25 points per game during junior and senior seasons. He was one of three finalists for Tennessee Mr. Basketball as a senior. Hoover committed to play college basketball for Wofford, the first school to offer him a scholarship.

== College career ==
In his collegiate debut, Hoover scored 18 points against LSU. Hoover averaged 7.8 points, and 2.4 rebounds per game as a freshman. He was named to the Southern Conference All-Freshman Team. As a sophomore, Hoover mainly came off the bench and averaged 11.0 points, 2.6 rebounds, and 1.4 assists per game. He helped Wofford reach the NCAA Tournament during his junior season, teaming with Fletcher Magee to form one of Division I's top three-point shooting pairs. Hoover was named to the SoCon All-Tournament Team. He averaged 13.6 points and 2.5 rebounds per game as a junior. On February 8, 2020, he scored a career-high 31 points in an 84–77 loss to Chattanooga. As a senior, Hoover averaged 14.7 points, 3.5 rebounds and 1.4 assists per game. He was named to the Second Team All-SoCon.

== Professional career ==
Hoover signed his first professional contract with BC Borisfen of the Belarusian Premier League on July 31, 2021.

Hoover won the 2023 Liga Sudamericana de Básquetbol with Instituto. He won the league's MVP award and averaged 14 points, 3.3 rebounds and 1.3 assists.

On February 4, 2026, he joined Club Melilla Baloncesto in the Primera FEB, the second tier of Spanish basketball.

== Career statistics ==
Legend
GP	Games played	GS	Games started	MPG	Minutes per game
FG%	Field goal percentage	3P%	3-point field goal percentage	FT%	Free throw percentage
RPG	Rebounds per game	APG	Assists per game	SPG	Steals per game
BPG	Blocks per game	PPG	Points per game	**Bold**	Career high

=== College ===
Year	Team	GP	GS	MPG	FG%	3P%	FT%	RPG	APG	SPG	BPG	PPG
2016–17	Wofford	33	15	24.9	.384	.353	.838	2.4	1.1	.2	**.1**	7.8
2017–18	Wofford	34	18	27.1	.425	.405	.831	2.6	**1.4**	**.6**	**.1**	11.0
2018–19	Wofford	**35**	**35**	28.6	**.457**	**.469**	.906	2.5	1.0	**.6**	.0	13.6
2019–20	Wofford	**35**	**35**	**33.3**	.367	.297	**.930**	**3.5**	**1.4**	**.6**	.0	**14.7**
Career		137	103	28.5	.406	.373	.889	2.8	1.2	0.5	0.0	11.8
