= 2022–23 Basketball Champions League Americas =

4th season of the Basketball Champions League Americas

BCL Americas
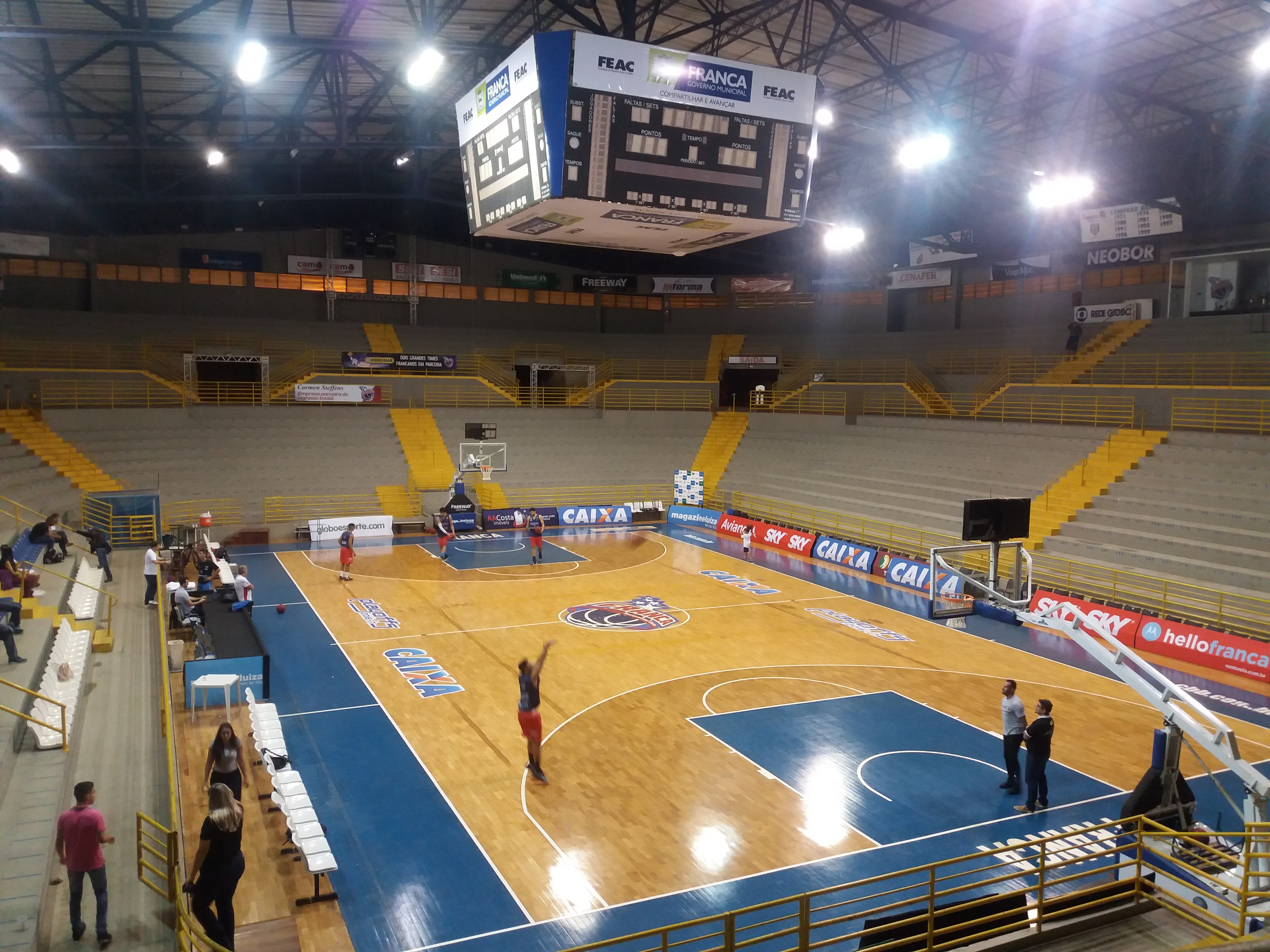
- The Pedrocão hosted the Final Four
- Season: 2022–23
- Dates: 9 December 2022 – 15 April 2023
- Teams: 12

Regular season
- Season MVP: (Brazil) Lucas Mariano

Finals
- Champions: (Brazil) Sesi Franca (1st league title; 10th continental title)
- Runners-up: (Brazil) Flamengo
- Third place: (Brazil) 123 Minas
- Fourth place: (Argentina) Quimsa

The 2022–23 Basketball Champions League Americas season was the 4th of the Basketball Champions League Americas (BCLA) season. It was also the 24th season of Pan-American top-level competition, as well as the 61st season of South American top-level competitions.

The Final Four took place on 14 and 15 April 2023, at the Ginásio Pedrocão in Franca, Brazil. Final Four hosts Sesi Franca won their first BCLA championship, and their record 10th continental title, by defeating Flamengo in the final. As the champions, Franca qualified for the 2023 FIBA Intercontinental Cup in Singapore.

São Paulo were the defending champions, but they did not qualify for the tournament and thus were unable to defend their title.

== Team allocation ==
The following teams have been confirmed for the upcoming season:

(Brazil) Franca (1st)	(Argentina) Instituto (1st)	(Uruguay) Biguá (1st)	(Nicaragua) Real Estelí (1st)
(Brazil) Flamengo (2nd)	(Argentina) Quimsa (2nd)	(Uruguay) Peñarol (2nd)	(Canada) Brampton Honey Badgers (1st)
(Brazil) Minas (3rd)	(Argentina) Obras Sanitarias (WC)	(Chile) Universidad de Concepción (1st)	(Mexico) Libertadores de Querétaro (WC)

== Group stage ==
The draw for the group stage was held on 14 October in Miami.

=== Group A ===
Pos	Team	Pld	W	L	PF	PA	PD	Pts	Qualification
1	(Mexico) Libertadores de Querétaro	6	5	1	595	538	+57	11	Advance to quarterfinals
2	(Nicaragua) Real Estelí	6	4	2	577	551	+26	10	Advance to quarterfinals
3	(Canada) Brampton Honey Badgers	6	0	6	531	608	−77	6	

Source: BCL Americas

9 December 2022	Libertadores de Querétaro (Mexico)	99–83	(Canada) Brampton Honey Badgers	Querétaro, Mexico
	Scoring by quarter: –, –, –, –
				Arena: Auditorio José María Arteaga

10 December 2022	Brampton Honey Badgers (Canada)	82–94	(Nicaragua) Real Estelí	Querétaro, Mexico
	Scoring by quarter: –, –, –, –
				Arena: Auditorio José María Arteaga

11 December 2022	Libertadores de Querétaro (Mexico)	98–87	(Nicaragua) Real Estelí	Querétaro, Mexico
	Scoring by quarter: –, –, –, –
				Arena: Auditorio José María Arteaga

16 January 2023	Real Estelí (Nicaragua)	98–84	(Mexico) Libertadores de Querétaro	Managua, Nicaragua
	Scoring by quarter: –, –, –, –
				Arena: Polideportivo Alexis Argüello

17 January 2023	Libertadores de Querétaro (Mexico)	106–90	(Canada) Brampton Honey Badgers	Managua, Nicaragua
	Scoring by quarter: –, –, –, –
				Arena: Polideportivo Alexis Argüello

18 January 2023	Real Estelí (Nicaragua)	109–93	(Canada) Brampton Honey Badgers	Managua, Nicaragua
	Scoring by quarter: 26–13, 28–33, 28–18, 27–9
	Pts: Robinson 33; Rebs: Robinson 13; Asts: Terrell Holloway 10	Boxscore	Pts: Rice 25; Rebs: Taylor Jr. 9 Asts: Taylor Jr. 5	Arena: CAA Centre

7 February 2023	Brampton Honey Badgers (Canada)	93–99	(Nicaragua) Real Estelí	Brampton, Canada
22:00	Scoring by quarter: 18–33, 24–25, 27–20, 24–21
				Arena: CAA Centre

8 February 2023	Real Estelí (Nicaragua)	90–101	(Mexico) Libertadores de Querétaro	Brampton, Canada
22:00	Scoring by quarter: 21–30, 29–24, 19–23, 21–24
		Boxscore		Arena: CAA Centre

9 February 2023	Brampton Honey Badgers (Canada)	86–107	(Mexico) Libertadores de Querétaro	Brampton, Canada
22:00	Scoring by quarter: 14–25, 22–21, 28–24, 22–37
		Boxscore		Arena: CAA Centre

=== Group B ===
Pos	Team	Pld	W	L	PF	PA	PD	Pts	Qualification
1	(Argentina) Quimsa	6	5	1	523	481	+42	11	Advance to quarterfinals
2	(Brazil) 123 Minas	6	3	3	533	473	+60	9	Advance to quarterfinals
3	(Uruguay) Biguá	6	1	5	451	553	−102	7	

Source: BCL Americas

12 December 2022	Biguá (Uruguay)	75–93	(Brazil) 123 Minas	Montevideo, Uruguay
	Scoring by quarter: 22–26, 23–33, 20–18, 10–16
		Boxscore		Arena: Palacio Peñarol

13 December 2022	123 Minas (Brazil)	93–95	(Argentina) Quimsa	Montevideo, Uruguay
	Scoring by quarter: 15–15, 28–34, 20–18, 30–28
		Boxscore		Arena: Palacio Peñarol

14 December 2022	Biguá (Uruguay)	73–88	(Argentina) Quimsa	Montevideo, Uruguay
	Scoring by quarter: 24–17, 15–20, 13–22, 21–29
		Boxscore		Arena: Palacio Peñarol

16 January 2023	123 Minas (Brazil)	74–86	(Argentina) Quimsa	Belo Horizonte, Brazil
	Scoring by quarter: 13–23, 21–24, 24–17, 16–22
		Boxscore		Arena: Arena Minas Tenis Clube

17 January 2023	Quimsa (Argentina)	83–102	(Uruguay) Biguá	Belo Horizonte, Brazil
	Scoring by quarter: 22–24, 24–23, 17–26, 20–29
		Boxscore		Arena: Arena Minas Tenis Clube

18 January 2023	123 Minas (Brazil)	90–61	(Uruguay) Biguá	Belo Horizonte, Brazil
	Scoring by quarter: 24–17, 23–14, 21–14, 22–16
		Boxscore		Arena: Arena Minas Tenis Clube

3 February 2023	Quimsa (Argentina)	88–67	(Uruguay) Biguá	Santiago del Estero, Argentina
	Scoring by quarter: 28–11, 12–24, 21–17, 27–15
		Boxscore		Arena: Estadio Ciudad

4 February 2023	Biguá (Uruguay)	73–111	(Brazil) 123 Minas	Santiago del Estero, Argentina
	Scoring by quarter: 17–21, 17–38, 20–23, 19–29
		Boxscore		Arena: Estadio Ciudad

5 February 2023	Quimsa (Argentina)	83–72	(Brazil) 123 Minas	Santiago del Estero, Argentina
	Scoring by quarter: 27–17, 14–22, 23–17, 19–16
		Boxscore		Arena: Estadio Ciudad

=== Group C ===
Pos	Team	Pld	W	L	PF	PA	PD	Pts	Qualification
1	(Brazil) Flamengo	6	5	1	540	394	+146	11	Advance to quarterfinals
2	(Uruguay) Peñarol	6	2	4	412	503	−91	8	Advance to quarterfinals
3	(Argentina) Instituto	6	2	4	420	475	−55	8	

Source: BCL Americas

12 December 2022	Peñarol (Uruguay)	64–56	(Argentina) Instituto	Montevideo, Uruguay
	Scoring by quarter: 12–12, 20–13, 16–16, 16–15
		Boxscore		Arena: Palacio Peñarol

13 December 2022	Flamengo (Brazil)	81–89	(Argentina) Instituto	Montevideo, Uruguay
	Scoring by quarter: 21–21, 23–23, 12–21, 25–24
		Boxscore		Arena: Palacio Peñarol

14 December 2022	Peñarol (Uruguay)	67–94	(Brazil) Flamengo	Montevideo, Uruguay
	Scoring by quarter: 16–25, 18–24, 17–23, 16–22
		Boxscore		Arena: Palacio Peñarol

13 January 2023	Flamengo (Brazil)	103–47	(Uruguay) Peñarol	Rio de Janeiro, Brazil
	Scoring by quarter: 29–10, 19–22, 29–6, 26–9
		Boxscore		Arena: Tijuca Tênis Clube

14 January 2023	Instituto (Argentina)	80–89	(Uruguay) Peñarol	Rio de Janeiro, Brazil
	Scoring by quarter: 22–21, 13–18, 20–20, 25–30
		Boxscore		Arena: Tijuca Tênis Clube

15 January 2023	Flamengo (Brazil)	91–46	(Argentina) Instituto	Rio de Janeiro, Brazil
	Scoring by quarter: 31–21, 11–8, 31–9, 18–8
		Boxscore		Arena: Tijuca Tênis Clube

6 February 2023	Instituto (Argentina)	71–79	(Brazil) Flamengo	Córdoba, Argentina
	Scoring by quarter: 18–29, 16–18, 25–17, 12–15
		Boxscore		Arena: Gimnasio Ángel Sandrín

7 February 2023	Peñarol (Uruguay)	74–92	(Brazil) Flamengo	Córdoba, Argentina
	Scoring by quarter: 18–22, 22–24, 22–23, 12–23
		Boxscore		Arena: Gimnasio Ángel Sandrín

8 February 2023	Instituto (Argentina)	78–71	(Uruguay) Peñarol	Córdoba, Argentina
	Scoring by quarter: 21–19, 16–20, 20–12, 21–20
		Boxscore		Arena: Gimnasio Ángel Sandrín

=== Group D ===
Pos	Team	Pld	W	L	PF	PA	PD	Pts	Qualification
1	(Brazil) Sesi Franca	6	6	0	584	459	+125	12	Advance to quarterfinals
2	(Chile) Universidad de Concepción	6	2	4	500	533	−33	8	Advance to quarterfinals
3	(Argentina) Obras Basket	6	1	5	469	561	−92	7	

Source: BCL Americas

9 December 2022	Universidad de Concepción (Chile)	92–106	(Brazil) Sesi Franca	Concepción, Chile
	Scoring by quarter: 15–33, 31–21, 28–29, 18–23
		Boxscore		Arena: Casa del Deporte

10 December 2022	Sesi Franca (Brazil)	104–87	(Argentina) Obras Basket	Concepción, Chile
	Scoring by quarter: 25–17, 27–36, 28–17, 24–17
		Boxscore		Arena: Casa del Deporte

11 December 2022	Universidad de Concepción (Chile)	92–97	(Argentina) Obras Basket	Concepción, Chile
	Scoring by quarter: 16–27, 19–21, 31–19, 26–30
		Boxscore		Arena: Casa del Deporte

13 January 2023	Obras Basket (Argentina)	69–90	(Chile) Universidad de Concepción	Buenos Aires, Argentina
	Scoring by quarter: 17–18, 18–30, 19–17, 15–25
		Boxscore		Arena: Arena Obras Sanitarias

14 January 2023	Universidad de Concepción (Chile)	76–83	(Brazil) Sesi Franca	Buenos Aires, Argentina
	Scoring by quarter: 19–21, 13–24, 24–15, 20–23
		Boxscore		Arena: Arena Obras Sanitarias

15 January 2023	Obras Basket (Argentina)	76–83	(Brazil) Sesi Franca	Buenos Aires, Argentina
	Scoring by quarter: 22–26, 18–15, 23–19, 13–23
		Boxscore		Arena: Arena Obras Sanitarias

3 February 2023	Sesi Franca (Brazil)	105–65	(Argentina) Obras Basket	Franca, Brazil
	Scoring by quarter: 24–20, 29–16, 30–15, 22–14
		Boxscore

4 February 2023	Obras Basket (Argentina)	75–87	(Chile) Universidad de Concepción	Franca, Brazil
	Scoring by quarter: 22–27, 23–18, 14–24, 16–18
		Boxscore

5 February 2023	Sesi Franca (Brazil)	103–63	(Chile) Universidad de Concepción	Franca, Brazil
	Scoring by quarter: 21–14, 32–20, 31–8, 19–21
		Boxscore

== Quarterfinals ==
The quarterfinals took place in March 2023. The four winners advanced to the Final Four. Teams listed as "Team 1" hosted games 2 and 3.

Team 1	Series	Team 2	Game 1	Game 2	Game 3
Sesi Franca (Brazil)	2–0	(Uruguay) Peñarol	91–84	87–72	—
Flamengo (Brazil)	2–0	(Chile) Universidad de Concepción	92–64	88–86	—
Libertadores de Querétaro (Mexico)	0–2	(Brazil) 123 Minas	78–98	84–93	—
Quimsa (Argentina)	2–0	(Nicaragua) Real Estelí	94–86	103–67	—

== Final Four ==
On 14 March 2023, FIBA announced the Final Four would be hosted by Franca in the Ginásio Poliesportivo Pedrocão in the Brazilian city of Franca, SP. The games took place on 14 and 15 April 2023.

=== Bracket ===
Semifinals
14 April
(Brazil) 123 Minas	75
(Brazil) Flamengo	80
14 April
(Brazil) Sesi Franca	91
(Argentina) Quimsa	73

Final
15 April
(Brazil) Flamengo	79
(Brazil) Sesi Franca	88
Third place game
15 April
(Brazil) 123 Minas	94
(Argentina) Quimsa	81

=== Semifinals ===
14 April 2023	123 Minas (Brazil)	75–80	(Brazil) Flamengo	Franca, Brazil
17:30	Scoring by quarter: 22–15, 18–26, 20–22, 15–17
	Pts: Alexey 25; Rebs: Johnson 5 Asts: Borges 7	Boxscore	Pts: Cuello 19; Rebs: Jaú 8 Asts: Fischer 5	Arena: Pedrocão; Referees: Julio Anaya (PAN), Daniel García (VEN), Diego Chiconato (BRA)

14 April 2023	Sesi Franca (Brazil)	91–73	(Argentina) Quimsa	Franca, Brazil
20:30	Scoring by quarter: 20–20, 17–10, 25–27, 29–16
	Pts: Lucas M. 22; Rebs: Dias 11; Asts: Georginho 6	Boxscore	Pts: Robinson 24; Rebs: Hernández, Ramírez 5 Asts: Cosolito, Ramírez 3	Arena: Pedrocão; Referees: Roberto Vásquez (PUR), Omar Bermúdez (MEX), Andrés Bartel (URU)

=== Third place game ===
15 April 2023	123 Minas (Brazil)	94–81	(Argentina) Quimsa	Franca, Brazil
17:00	Scoring by quarter: 25–23, 24–16, 16–23, 29–19
	Pts: Alexey 20; Rebs: four players 5 Asts: Alexey 4	Boxscore	Pts: Ramírez 19; Rebs: Anderson 8 Asts: Anderson 4	Arena: Pedrocão; Referees: Omar Bermúdez (MEX), Daniel García (VEN), Johnny Batista (PUR)

=== Final ===
15 April 2023	Flamengo (Brazil)	79–88	(Brazil) Sesi Franca	Franca, Brazil
20:30	Scoring by quarter: 17–29, 21–20, 22–15, 19–24
	Pts: Deodato 25; Rebs: Hettsheimeir 6 Asts: five players 1	Boxscore	Pts: Georginho, Lucas M. 16; Rebs: three players 7 Asts: Georginho 5	Arena: Pedrocão; Referees: Roberto Vásquez (PUR), Julio Anaya (PAN), Juan Fernández (ARG)

== Individual awards ==
The Most Valuable Player award, as well as the all-league team (in Spanish: el Quinteto ideal) were announced after the final on 15 April 2023.

- Most Valuable Player: Lucas Mariano, Sesi Franca
- All-League First Team:
  - Lucas Mariano, Sesi Franca
  - Georginho, Sesi Franca
  - Lucas Dias, Sesi Franca
  - Martín Cuello, Flamengo
  - Alexey Borges, 123 Minas

== Statistics ==
The following were the statistical leaders in the 2022–23 season.

=== Individual statistic leaders ===
Category	Player	Team(s)	Statistic
Efficiency per game	(Dominican Republic) Luis Santos	Biguá	25.5
Points per game	(Puerto Rico) Ismael Romero	Libertadores de Querétaro	21.3
Rebounds per game	(Dominican Republic) Luis Santos	Biguá	10.8
Assists per game	(Brazil) Alexey Borges	123 Minas	6.4
Steals per game	(Argentina) Leandro Vildoza	Instituto ACC	2.7
Blocks per game	(United States) Eric Anderson	Quimsa	2.0
Turnovers per game	(Chile) Eugenio Bocaz	UdeC	3.5
Minutes per game	(United States) Jerry Evans Jr.	UdeC	33.3

=== Individual game highs ===
Category	Player	Team	Statistic
Efficiency	(Puerto Rico) Ismael Romero	Libertadores de Querétaro	41
Points	(United States) Thomas Robinson	Real Estelí	33
Rebounds	(Dominican Republic) Luis Santos	Biguá	16
Assists	(Uruguay) Santiago Vidal	Biguá	14
Steals	(Brazil) Guilherme Deodato	Flamengo	6
Steals	(Argentina) Leandro Vildoza	Instituto ACC	6
Blocks	(United States) Eric Anderson	Quimsa	5
Three pointers	Five occasions		7
