= 2019–20 Basketball Champions League Americas =

Basketball Champions League Americas
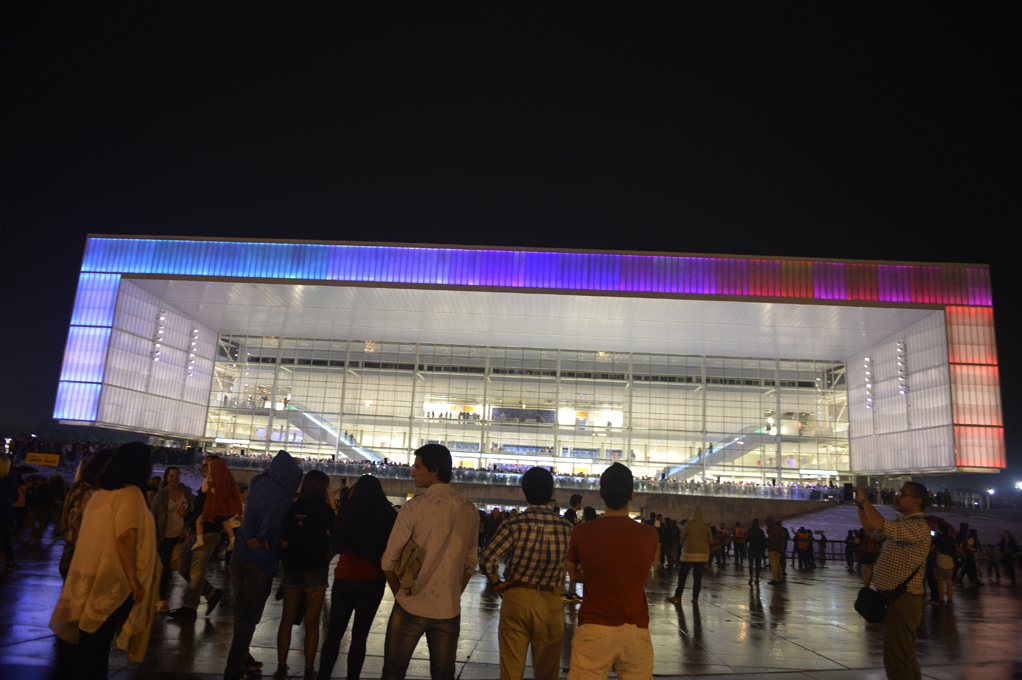
- The Antel Arena in Montevideo hosted the final
- Season: 2019–20
- Dates: 28 October 2019 – 30 October 2020
- Games played: 40
- Teams: 12

Regular season
- Season MVP: (United States) Brandon Robinson (Quimsa)

Finals
- Champions: (Argentina) Quimsa (1st title)
- Runners-up: (Brazil) Flamengo

The 2019–20 Basketball Champions League Americas season was the 13th edition of the top-tier level professional club basketball competition in the Americas and first of the Basketball Champions League Americas (BCLA) since launched by FIBA in September 2019. It was also the 21st season of Pan-American top-level competition, as well as the 58th season of South American top-level competition.

The competition began on 28 October 2019, with the group phase, and would have been concluded in April 2020. On 14 March 2020, FIBA suspended all of its competitions until further notice due to the COVID-19 pandemic. The competition resumed on 27 October 2020 with an altered format, including a single-match final in Montevideo, Uruguay, on 30 October 2020.

San Lorenzo won the last FIBA Americas League tournament. They were eliminated in the semifinals by eventual winners Quimsa, who went onto beat Flamengo 92–86 in the final to be crowned as the inaugural champions of the Basketball Champions League Americas. As champions, Quimsa qualified for the 2021 FIBA Intercontinental Cup.

== Team allocation ==
A total of 12 teams from 7 countries will participate in the 2019–20 Basketball Champions League Americas. The participating teams were announced on 1 October 2019.

=== Teams ===
League positions after eventual playoffs of the previous season shown in parentheses.

Group phase
(Argentina) San Lorenzo^{LDA} (1st)	(Brazil) Flamengo (1st)	(Uruguay) Aguada (1st)	(Mexico) Capitanes (2nd)
(Argentina) Instituto (2nd)	(Brazil) Franca (2nd)	(Uruguay) Biguá (WC)	(Chile) Valdivia (1st)
(Argentina) Quimsa (CW)	(Brazil) Mogi das Cruzes (3rd)	(Mexico) Fuerza Regia (1st)	(Nicaragua) Real Estelí (WC)

The labels in the parentheses show how each team qualified for the place of its starting round:

- 1st, 2nd, etc.: League position after Playoffs
- LDA: FIBA Americas League title holders
- CW: Preseason tournament winners
- WC: Qualified through Wild Card

== Round and draw dates ==
The schedule of the competition is as follows.

Phase	Round	Dates
Group phase	Gameday 1	28 October – 1 November 2019
Group phase	Gameday 2	24–29 November 2019
Group phase	Gameday 3	16–20 December 2019
Playoffs	Quarterfinals	14–21 January 2020
Playoffs	Semifinals	9 March – 27 October 2020 (originally 9–14 March 2020)
Playoffs	Final	30 October 2020 (originally April 2020) (Note: The final originally consisted of a best-of-three series, but it was changed to a single game in a neutral venue due to the COVID-19 pandemic.)

== Group phase ==
The 12 teams are drawn into four groups of three, while taking into account geographic location. In each group, teams play against each other home-and-away, in a round-robin format. The group winners and runners-up advance to the quarterfinals, while the remaining team in each group is eliminated. The Group phase started on 28 October and will end on 20 December 2019.

=== Group A ===
Pos	Team	Pld	W	L	PF	PA	PD	Pts	Qualification	SLR	MDC	BIG
1	(Argentina) San Lorenzo	4	4	0	390	335	+55	8	Advance to quarterfinals	—	107–78	104–88
2	(Brazil) Mogi das Cruzes	4	2	2	339	355	−16	6	Advance to quarterfinals	78–82	—	91–76
3	(Uruguay) Biguá	4	0	4	345	384	−39	4		91–97	90–92	—

Source: BCL Americas

=== Group B ===
Pos	Team	Pld	W	L	PF	PA	PD	Pts	Qualification	QUI	FRA	AGU
1	(Argentina) Quimsa	4	3	1	367	330	+37	7	Advance to quarterfinals	—	98–92	87–61
2	(Brazil) Franca	4	2	2	349	324	+25	6	Advance to quarterfinals	74–82	—	95–94
3	(Uruguay) Aguada	4	1	3	308	370	−62	5		103–100	50–88	—

Source: BCL Americas

=== Group C ===
Pos	Team	Pld	W	L	PF	PA	PD	Pts	Qualification	FLA	INS	VAL
1	(Brazil) Flamengo	4	4	0	338	301	+37	8	Advance to quarterfinals	—	81–76	82–71
2	(Argentina) Instituto	4	2	2	325	308	+17	6	Advance to quarterfinals	75–83	—	92–67
3	(Chile) Valdivia	4	0	4	294	348	−54	4		79–92	77–82	—

Source: BCL Americas

=== Group D ===
Pos	Team	Pld	W	L	PF	PA	PD	Pts	Qualification	RES	FUE	CAP
1	(Nicaragua) Real Estelí	4	4	0	381	331	+50	8	Advance to quarterfinals	—	90–65	99–85
2	(Mexico) Fuerza Regia	4	1	3	327	348	−21	5 (Note: Head-to-head points scored: Fuerza Regia 170–161 Capitanes.)	Advance to quarterfinals	92–97	—	77–64
3	(Mexico) Capitanes	4	1	3	335	364	−29	5		89–95	97–93	—

Source: BCL Americas

== Playoffs ==
=== Bracket ===
Quarterfinals
(Argentina) Quimsa	90	96
(Brazil) Mogi das Cruzes	84	83
(Argentina) San Lorenzo	59	91	75
(Brazil) Franca	75	76	73
(Brazil) Flamengo	90	103
(Mexico) Fuerza Regia	67	76
(Nicaragua) Real Estelí	80	87	85
(Argentina) Instituto	88	85	90

Semifinals
(Argentina) Quimsa	91	87	110
(Argentina) San Lorenzo	84	100	97
(Brazil) Flamengo	63	66
(Argentina) Instituto	54	64

Final
(Argentina) Quimsa	92
(Brazil) Flamengo	86

Team 1 hosts games 2 and 3.

=== Quarterfinals ===
Team 1	Series	Team 2	Game 1	Game 2	Game 3
San Lorenzo (Argentina)	2–1	(Brazil) Franca	59–75	91–76	75–73
Quimsa (Argentina)	2–0	(Brazil) Mogi das Cruzes	90–84	96–83	
Flamengo (Brazil)	2–0	(Mexico) Fuerza Regia	90–67	103–76	
Real Estelí (Nicaragua)	1–2	(Argentina) Instituto	80–88	87–85	85–90

=== Semifinals ===
Team 1	Series	Team 2	Game 1	Game 2	Game 3
Quimsa (Argentina)	2–1	(Argentina) San Lorenzo	91–84	87–100	110–97 (OT)
Flamengo (Brazil)	2–0	(Argentina) Instituto	63–54	66–64	

=== Final ===
30 October 2020	Quimsa (Argentina)	92–86	(Brazil) Flamengo	Montevideo
20:00 UTC−3	Scoring by quarter: 27–19, 23–24, 13–25, 29–18
	Pts: Robinson 26; Rebs: Ramírez 8 Asts: Copello, Ramírez 3	Boxscore	Pts: Marquinhos 20; Rebs: three players 6 Asts: Balbi 5	Arena: Antel Arena; Attendance: 0 (Note: The remainder of the competition, held in October 2020, was played behind closed doors due to the COVID-19 pandemic.); Referees: Andrés Bartel (URU), Gonzalo Salgueiro (URU), Carlos Peralta (ECU)

== Statistics ==
The following were the statistical leaders in the 2019–20 BCL Americas season.

=== Individual statistic leaders ===
Category	Player	Team(s)	Statistic
Efficiency per game	(Brazil) Danilo Fuzaro	Mogi das Cruzes	22.0
Points per game	(United States) Dwayne Davis	Instituto ACC	23.0
Rebounds per game	(Brazil) Alexandre De Sousa	Mogi das Cruzes	8.8
Assists per game	(Argentina) Franco Balbi	Flamengo	6.4
Steals per game	(Argentina) Juan Brussino	Quimsa	2.0
Blocks per game	(Nicaragua) Bartel Lopez	Real Estelí	1.9
Turnovers per game	(United States) Brandon Robinson	Quimsa	3.1
Minutes per game	(Brazil) Danilo Fuzaro	Mogi das Cruzes	35.1
FG%	(Puerto Rico) Ismael Romero	Quimsa	65.2%
3P%	(United States) David Jackson	Franca	57.6%

=== Individual game highs ===
Category	Player	Team	Statistic
Efficiency	(Jordan) Dar Tucker	San Lorenzo	37
Points	(Mexico) Omar de Haro	Fuerza Regia	38
Rebounds	(Mexico) Josh Ibarra	Fuerza Regia	14
Rebounds	(United States) Storm Warren	Biguá	14
Assists	(Argentina) Franco Balbi	Flamengo	12
Steals	(United States) Michael Lizárraga	Fuerza Regia	6
Blocks	(United States) Justin Williams	San Lorenzo	4
Blocks	(United States) Sam Clancy	Instituto ACC	4
Three pointers	(Mexico) Omar de Haro	Fuerza Regia	8
