= Ismael Romero =

Cuban basketball player

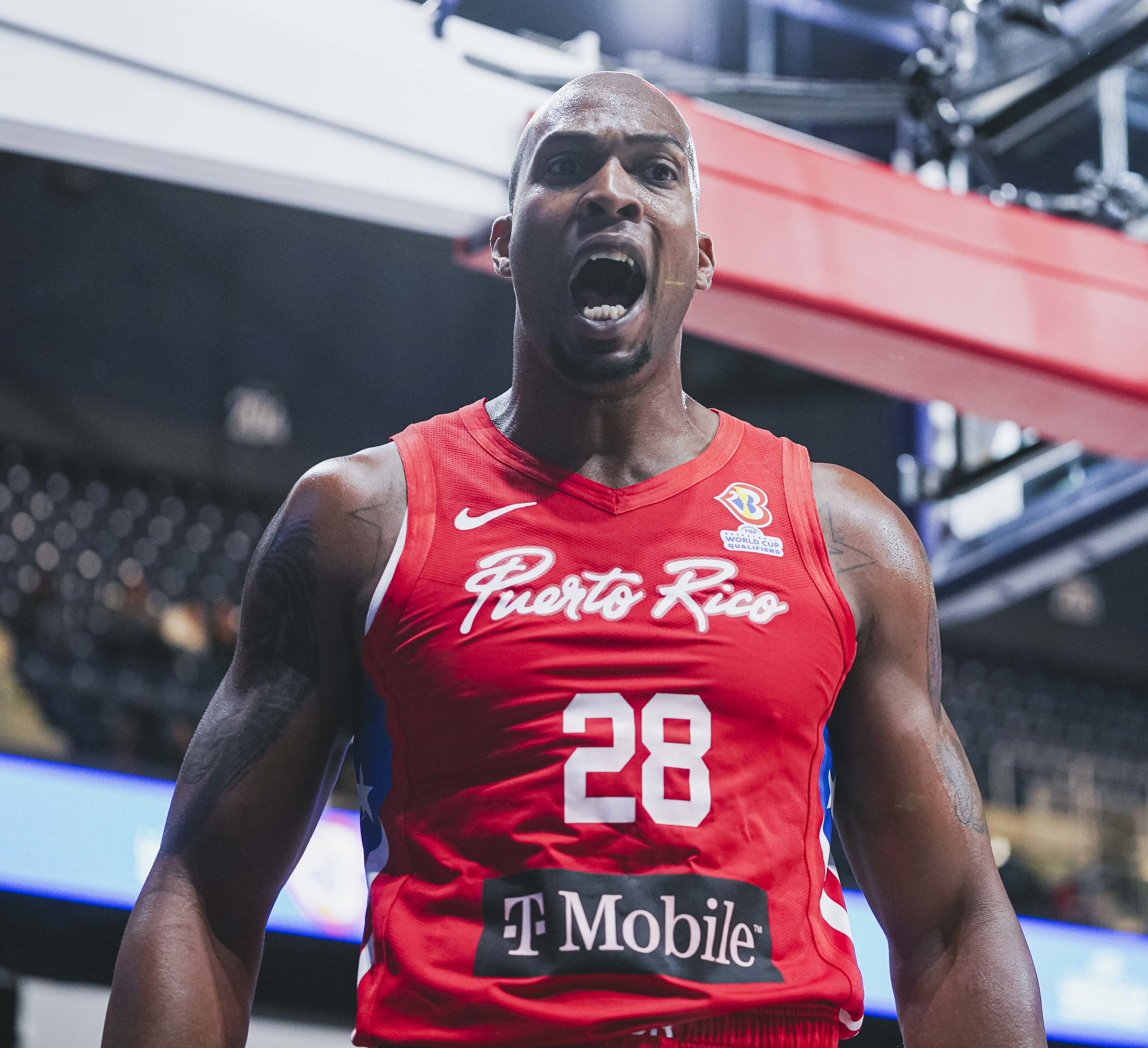
- Romero with Puerto Rico during the qualifiers for the 2023 World Cup

No. 28 – Mets de Guaynabo
- Position: Power forward / center
- League: BSN

Personal information
- Born: June 23, 1991 (age 35) Santa Clara, Cuba
- Listed height: 6 ft 9 in (2.06 m)
- Listed weight: 220 lb (100 kg)

Career information
- College: Universidad del Turabo (2011–2015)
- NBA draft: 2013: undrafted
- Playing career: 2015–present

Career history
- 2007–2011: Villa Clara
- 2015–2016: Grand Rapids Drive
- 2016–2017: Atléticos de San Germán
- 2016: Panteras de Aguascalientes
- 2017: Grand Rapids Drive
- 2017–2024: Vaqueros de Bayamón
- 2017: Indios de San Francisco de Macorís
- 2017–2018: Hapoel Haifa
- 2018–2019: Mexico City Capitanes
- 2019–2021: Quimsa
- 2021–2022: Real Estelí
- 2022–2023: Libertadores de Querétaro
- 2023: Real Betis
- 2023–2024: Real Estelí
- 2024–2025: Mets de Guaynabo
- 2024–2025: Suwon KT Sonicboom
- 2025: Al Ahli Tripoli
- 2025–2026: Meralco Bolts
- 2026–present: Mets de Guaynabo

Career highlights
- BCL Americas champion (2020); BCL Americas scoring leader (2023); BCL Americas rebounding leader (2022); 2× BSN champion (2020, 2022); BSN Rookie of the Year (2016); 4x BSN Sixth Man of the Year (2020-2023); LSB Rookie of the Year (2011)

Ismael Romero Fernández (born June 23, 1991) is a Cuban-Puerto Rican professional basketball player for the Mets de Guaynabo of the Baloncesto Superior Nacional (BSN). He is a member of the Puerto Rican national team and formerly represented the Cuban national team. He played college basketball for Universidad del Turabo from Puerto Rico.

== College career ==
After leaving Cuba, Romero attended the Universidad del Turabo of Puerto Rico where he helped his team to win, undefeated, the Liga Atlética Interuniversitaria de Puerto Rico (LAI) in 2014.

== Professional career ==
In 2007, Romero joined local team Villa Clara, where he played for four seasons. On October 31, he was selected by the Grand Rapids Drive in the fourth round of the 2015 NBA Development League Draft. On January 28, 2016, he made his D-League debut in a 90–87 win over the Iowa Energy, recording one point and one rebound in seven minutes. On March 20, 2016, Romero had a double-double in a 102–97 win over the Fort Wayne Mad Ants, finishing with 13 points, 14 rebounds and three steals, including nine points in the fourth quarter. In 27 games, he averaged 5.4 points and 4.9 rebounds per game.

On April 6, 2016, Romero signed with Atléticos de San Germán of the Puerto Rican League. The next day, he made his debut for San Germán in a 90–75 loss to Vaqueros de Bayamón, recording 11 points, three rebounds, three assists and one steal in 17 minutes. On May 26, he was named the BSN Rookie of the Year. In 17 games, he averaged 13.0 points, 5.1 rebounds, 1.4 assists and 1.2 steals in 24.1 minutes.

On August 30, 2016, Romero signed with Mexican team Panteras de Aguascalientes. In 24 games, he averaged 18.3 points, 8.0 rebounds, 1.2 assists and 0.8 steals in 23.8 minutes.

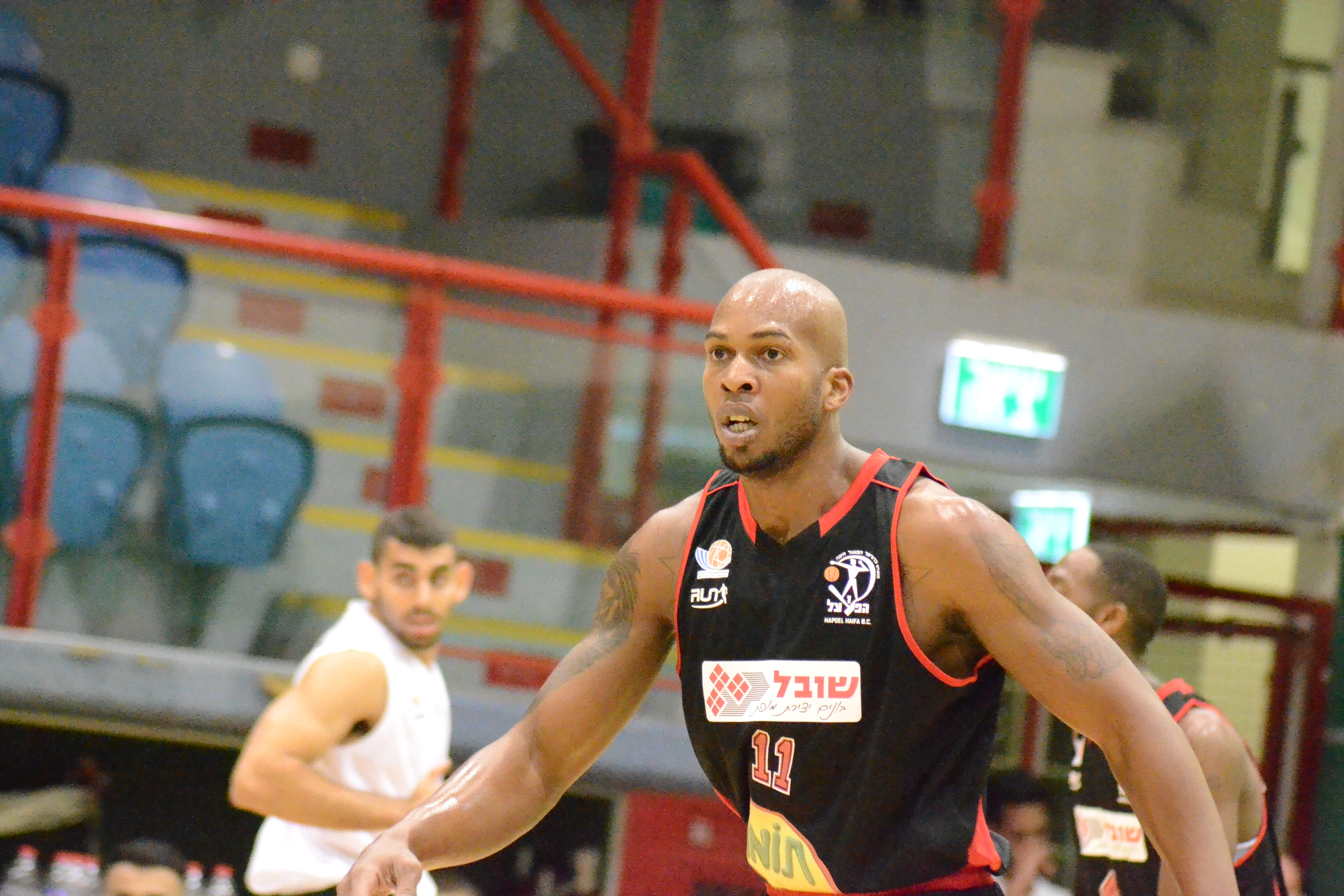
Romero with Hapoel Haifa, 2017

On January 4, 2017, Romero was reacquired by the Grand Rapids Drive. Two days later, he made his season debut for Grand Rapids in a 126–124 win over the Santa Cruz Warriors, recording six points, eight rebounds, one steal and two blocks in nine minutes off the bench. On April 1, 2017, Romero signed with Atléticos de San Germán, returning to the team for a second stint.

On July 7, 2017, Romero signed with Hapoel Haifa B.C., Israeli basketball team that play in the Liga Leumit.

On December 9, 2024, Romero joined Suwon KT Sonicboom of the Korean Basketball League, replacing Jordan Morgan. On March 1, 2025, he was replaced by Jordan Morgan.

On September 11, 2025, Romero joined the Meralco Bolts in the East Asia Super League as an import.

In September 2025, he played with Libyan club Al Ahli Tripoli at the 2025 FIBA Intercontinental Cup, where the team won a bronze medal, becoming the first African team in history to finish on the podium.

== International career ==
When Romero was 19, he played with the Cuba national basketball team at the 2012 Centrobasket, playing in an 81–61 loss against Bahamas. That very night, Romero, along with four other players of the Cuban selection, abandoned the team and asked for political asylum in Puerto Rico.

On September 13, 2021, the Puerto Rican Basketball Federation announced that they had initiated the naturalization process with FIBA for Romero to be able to represent the Puerto Rican national basketball team. On October 5, 2021, FIBA authorized the request for Romero's naturalization making him eligible to represent Puerto Rico in future competitions.

== Awards and accomplishments ==
=== Club ===
Vaqueros de Bayamón

- BSN champion: (2020 & 2022)

Quimsa

- BCL Americas: (2020)

=== Individual ===
- BSN Rookie of the Year: (2016)
- LSB Rookie of the Year: (2011)
- BCL Americas rebounding leader: (2022)
