= Juan Manuel Cavagliatto =

Argentine transport businessman and sports executive

President of Instituto Atlético Central Córdoba
- Incumbent
- Assumed office 3 May 2021
- Preceded by: Roberto Castoldi

Alternate member of the Executive Committee of the Argentine Football Association
- Incumbent
- Assumed office 2024

Personal details
- Born: July 13, 1987 (age 39) Córdoba, Argentina
- Occupation: Transport businessman, sports executive

Juan Manuel Cavagliatto (born 13 July 1987) is an Argentine transport businessman and sports executive who has served as president of Instituto Atlético Central Córdoba since 2021. He is the youngest president in the club's history.

== Biography ==
Cavagliatto comes from a family with a long tradition at Instituto: his grandfather, nicknamed "Toto", and his father, Mario, were among those who promoted basketball as one of the club's main activities. He spent his childhood just steps from the club's stadium, living for many years on the corner of Sucre and Lope de Vega streets in the Alta Córdoba neighbourhood. As a boy he trained as a basketball player at the club, where he was known by the nickname "Tatú", before also becoming involved in football.

In business, he works in the transport sector and owns Transporte Sucre, one of the leading firms of its kind in the city of Córdoba.

== Sports administration career ==
Cavagliatto rose through the club's basketball department, where he was part — together with his father Mario — of the project that rebuilt the programme: Instituto won the Córdoba provincial league in the 2011–12 season, in 2012 the team obtained a place in the Torneo Nacional de Ascenso — where it finished runner-up in 2014 — and in 2015, with Osvaldo "Turco" Arduh as head coach, it earned promotion to the Liga Nacional de Básquet after 29 years away from the top division.

On 3 May 2021, while serving as vice president, he took over the presidency of Instituto following the resignation of Roberto Castoldi. In August 2022 the club's electoral board confirmed the single "Juntos por Instituto" slate, submitted on 18 August, ratifying him as president for a three-year term. In August 2025 he was re-elected to lead the institution for a new four-year term.

=== Sporting achievements and titles ===
Under his presidency, Instituto's basketball team won the Torneo Súper 20 in 2021 and was crowned Liga Nacional champion on 14 June 2022, the first such title in the club's history, defeating Quimsa of Santiago del Estero 3–2 in the final series under head coach Lucas Victoriano. That same year, the football team earned promotion to the Argentine Primera División after a sixteen-year absence from the top flight.

On 3 December 2023, the basketball team won the Liga Sudamericana, the first international title in the club's history, defeating Titanes de Barranquilla 81–72 in the final played in Montevideo. In March 2026, the basketball team added the Supercopa de La Liga, beating Boca Juniors 86–81 in the seventh edition of the competition.

The club's main sporting achievements during his tenure are:

Year	Achievement	Sport	Country
2021	Torneo Súper 20	Basketball	(Argentina)
2022	Liga Nacional de Básquet (2021–22 season)	Basketball	(Argentina)
2022	Promotion to the Argentine Primera División	Football	(Argentina)
2023	Liga Sudamericana	Basketball	(Uruguay)
2026	Supercopa de La Liga	Basketball	(Argentina)

=== Club governance ===
At the club's General Ordinary Assembly in August 2025, the members approved the annual report and balance sheet, which showed a multi-million-peso surplus, and Cavagliatto was proclaimed together with the rest of the board of directors.

=== Infrastructure ===
His administration promoted an infrastructure plan that included the opening of the club's sports city (Ciudad Deportiva) at the La Agustina grounds, focused on youth divisions and player development.

Modernisation works were carried out at the Monumental de Alta Córdoba stadium, including the full replacement of the lighting with LED floodlights and the installation of a double fibre-optic ring, a project presented as the first "smart stadium" outside Buenos Aires.

=== Recognition ===
Cavagliatto received the award for best professional sports management (Dirigencia Deportiva Profesional) at the 2024 Cóndor Awards, presented by Agencia Córdoba Deportes, for the third consecutive year.

== Activity in the AFA ==
Cavagliatto has a close relationship with Claudio "Chiqui" Tapia, president of the Argentine Football Association, and has taken part in the association's official trips. In September 2024 he was included as an alternate member (vocal suplente) of the AFA Executive Committee for the 2024–2028 term, representing Instituto, a position listed on the association's official roster. He also represented the association at the 82nd Ordinary Congress of CONMEBOL, held in Quito.

== Public positions ==
Cavagliatto has spoken in defence of the model of Argentine clubs as non-profit civil associations and against the introduction of privately owned sports corporations (sociedades anónimas deportivas, SAD) into Argentine football, in response to proposals promoted by Mauricio Macri and the government of Javier Milei.
