= 2023 Liga Sudamericana de Básquetbol =

26th season of the Liga Sudamericana de Básquetbol

- League: Liga Sudamericana de Básquetbol
- Season: 2023
- Duration: 13 October – 3 December 2023
- Teams: 12

Finals
- Champions: (Argentina) Instituto (1st title)
- Runners-up: (Colombia) Titanes de Barranquilla
- Third place: (Argentina) Gimnasia y Esgrima (CR)
- Fourth place: (Colombia) Caribbean Storm

Awards
- Season MVP: Nathan Hoover (Instituto)

The 2023 Liga Sudamericana de Básquetbol, or 2023 FIBA South American Basketball League, was the 26th season of the Liga Sudamericana de Básquetbol (LSB), the second tier of basketball in South America organised by FIBA Americas. The season began 13 October and ended on 3 December 2023 with the Grand Final. The quarter-finals, semi-finals and Grand Final were all hosted in Montevideo.

Bauru was the defending champion, having won the 2022 title, but did not qualify for this season. Instituto won its first LSB championship after defeating Titanes de Barranquilla in the Grand Final.

== Team allocation ==
The following teams have been confirmed for the upcoming season:

- 1st, 2nd, etc.: Position in national league
- WC: Wild card

Teams in the 2023 Liga Sudamericana de Básquetbol
| (Argentina) Gimnasia y Esgrima (CR) (3rd) | (Chile) Los Leones de Quilpué (2nd) | (Paraguay) San José (1st) |
| (Argentina) Instituto (4th) | (Colombia) Caribbean Storm (2nd) | (Uruguay) Biguá (3rd) |
| (Argentina) Oberá TC (5th) | (Colombia) Titanes de Barranquilla (1st) | (Uruguay) Malvín (4th) |
| (Bolivia) Leones de Potosí (3rd) | (Ecuador) Soldiers TBT (1st) | (Uruguay) Peñarol (10th) |

== Group stage ==
Twelve teams participated in the group phase, in which each team faced the other teams in the group once. Each group tournament was held at the arena of a host team. The two highest-placed teams advanced to the semifinal phase. Games were played from 13 to 23 October, 2023.

=== Group A ===
The games of Group A were played from 13 October to 15 October 2023 in Oberá, Argentina.

| Pos | Team | Pld | W | L | PF | PA | PD | Pts | Qualification |
|---|---|---|---|---|---|---|---|---|---|
| 1 | (Paraguay) San José | 3 | 3 | 0 | 214 | 201 | +13 | 6 | Advance to final stage |
| 2 | (Argentina) Instituto | 3 | 2 | 1 | 242 | 194 | +48 | 5 | Advance to final stage |
| 3 | (Argentina) Oberá TC (H) | 3 | 1 | 2 | 233 | 240 | −7 | 4 | |
| 4 | (Uruguay) Malvín | 3 | 0 | 3 | 220 | 274 | −54 | 3 | |

Source: FIBA
(H) Hosts

=== Group B ===
The games of Group B were played from 16 October to 17 October 2023 in Montevideo, Uruguay.

| Pos | Team | Pld | W | L | PF | PA | PD | Pts | Qualification |
|---|---|---|---|---|---|---|---|---|---|
| 1 | (Uruguay) Peñarol (H) | 3 | 2 | 1 | 269 | 223 | +46 | 5 (Note: Head-to-head point difference: Peñarol +13, Gimnasia y Esgrima (CR) -3, Los Leones de Quilpué −13.) | Advance to final stage |
| 2 | (Argentina) Gimnasia y Esgrima (CR) | 3 | 2 | 1 | 256 | 204 | +52 | 5 | Advance to final stage |
| 3 | (Chile) Los Leones de Quilpué | 3 | 2 | 1 | 249 | 239 | +10 | 5 | |
| 4 | (Bolivia) Leones de Potosí | 3 | 0 | 3 | 167 | 275 | −108 | 3 | |

Source: FIBA
(H) Hosts

=== Group C ===
The games of Group A were played from 21 October to 23 October 2023 in Barranquilla, Colombia..

| Pos | Team | Pld | W | L | PF | PA | PD | Pts | Qualification |
|---|---|---|---|---|---|---|---|---|---|
| 1 | (Colombia) Titanes de Barranquilla (H) | 3 | 3 | 0 | 242 | 192 | +50 | 6 | Advance to final stage |
| 2 | (Colombia) Caribbean Storm | 3 | 2 | 1 | 226 | 231 | −5 | 5 | Advance to final stage |
| 3 | (Uruguay) Biguá | 3 | 1 | 2 | 230 | 213 | +17 | 4 | |
| 4 | (Ecuador) Soldiers TBT | 3 | 0 | 3 | 207 | 269 | −62 | 3 | |

Source: FIBA
(H) Hosts

== Final stage ==
=== Super 6 ===
The six teams that advanced from the group stage were paired according to their records, all matches were played in Montevideo, Uruguay.

All times are local (GMT-3)

==== First round ====
| 28 November 2023 | Gimnasia y Esgrima (CR) (Argentina) | 68–81 | (Argentina) Instituto | Montevideo |
| 18:40 | Scoring by quarter: 21–22, 20–15, 14–27, 13–17 |
| | Pts: Nazione 14; Rebs: De Vaughn 6 Asts: Webster 7 | Boxscore | Pts: Pomoli 17; Rebs: Pomoli 4 Asts: Vildoza 5 | Arena: Palacio Peñarol; Referees: Andres Bartel (URU), Alan Dos Santos (BRA), Carmelo de la Rosa Alvarez (PUR) |

| 28 November 2023 | Peñarol (Uruguay) | 82–86 | (Colombia) Caribbean Storm | Montevideo |
| 21:40 | Scoring by quarter: 21–18, 19–22, 17–30, 25–16 |
| | Pts: Granger 24; Rebs: Granger 7 Asts: Granger 8 | Boxscore | Pts: Ayarza 30; Rebs: Bethelmy 8 Asts: Liz 5 | Arena: Palacio Peñarol; Referees: Jorge Vazquez (PUR), Kristian Paez (ECU), Fernando Leite (BRA) |

==== Second round ====
| 29 November 2023 | Titanes de Barranquilla (Colombia) | 87–82 | (Argentina) Instituto | Montevideo |
| 18:40 | Scoring by quarter: 23–16, 19–21, 22–13, 23–32 |
| | Pts: Tello 25; Rebs: Tello 11; Asts: Zamora 9 | Boxscore | Pts: Hoover 21; Rebs: Lugarini 7 Asts: Vildoza 5 | Arena: Palacio Peñarol; Referees: Julio Anaya (PAN), Krishna Dominguez (MEX), Fernando Leite (BRA) |

| 29 November 2023 | Caribbean Storm (Colombia) | 82–72 | (Paraguay) San José | Montevideo |
| 21:40 | Scoring by quarter: 21–23, 28–19, 19–15, 14–15 |
| | Pts: Jackson 22; Rebs: Bethelmy 8 Asts: Jackson 22 | Boxscore | Pts: Sanchez 15; Rebs: Benitez 9 Asts: Paletta 7 | Arena: Palacio Peñarol; Referees: Kristian Paez (ECU), Alan Dos Santos (BRA), Carmelo de la Rosa Alvarez (PUR) |

==== Third round ====
| 30 November 2023 | San José (Paraguay) | 75–77 | (Argentina) Gimnasia y Esgrima (CR) | Montevideo |
| 18:40 | Scoring by quarter: 19–25, 25–26, 17–8, 14–18 |
| | Pts: Wood 15; Rebs: Wood 10; Asts: Wood 7 | Boxscore | Pts: Mariani 18; Rebs: Webster 7 Asts: Webster 10 | Arena: Palacio Peñarol; Referees: Jorge Vazquez (PUR), Andres Bartel (URU), Fernando Leite (BRA) |

| 30 November 2023 | Peñarol (Uruguay) | 52–64 | (Argentina) Instituto | Montevideo |
| 21:40 | Scoring by quarter: 13–16, 10–10, 17–20, 12–18 |
| | Pts: Granger 18; Rebs: Dime 9 Asts: Zanotta 4 | Boxscore | Pts: Hoover 22; Rebs: Saiz 11; Asts: Vildoza 4 | Arena: Palacio Peñarol; Referees: Krishna Dominguez (MEX), Kristian Paez (ECU), Alan Dos Santos (BRA) |

=== Final Four ===
==== Bracket ====
Semifinals
2 December
(Colombia) Titanes de Barranquilla | 83
(Argentina) Gimnasia y Esgrima (CR) | 74
2 December
(Colombia) Caribbean Storm | 69
(Argentina) Instituto | 83

Final
3 December
(Colombia) Titanes de Barranquilla | 72
(Argentina) Instituto | 81
Third place game
3 December
(Argentina) Gimnasia y Esgrima (CR) | 89
(Colombia) Caribbean Storm | 73

==== Semifinals ====
| 2 December 2023 | Titanes de Barranquilla (Colombia) | 83–74 | (Argentina) Gimnasia y Esgrima (CR) | Montevideo |
| 18:40 | Scoring by quarter: 21–22, 23–20, 19–14, 20–18 |
| | Pts: Tello 20; Rebs: Tello 14; Asts: Zamora 5 | Boxscore | Pts: Webster 22; Rebs: De Vaughn 7 Asts: Webster 6 | Arena: Palacio Peñarol; Referees: Kristian Paez (ECU), Alan Dos Santos (BRA), Carmelo de la Rosa Alvarez (PUR) |

| 2 December 2023 | Caribbean Storm (Colombia) | 69–83 | (Argentina) Instituto | Montevideo |
| 21:40 | Scoring by quarter: 11–18, 23–26, 14–14, 21–25 |
| | Pts: Almanza 12; Rebs: Bethelmy 7 Asts: Jackson 4 | Boxscore | Pts: Saiz 17; Rebs: Lugarini 8 Asts: Vildoza 5 | Arena: Palacio Peñarol; Referees: Jorge Vazquez (PUR), Julio Anaya (PAN), Andres Bartel (URU) |

==== Third place game ====
| 3 December 2023 | Gimnasia y Esgrima (CR) (Argentina) | 89–73 | (Colombia) Caribbean Storm | Montevideo |
| 18:40 | Scoring by quarter: 34–12, 13–20, 19–13, 23–28 |
| | Pts: Webster 21; Rebs: De Vaughn 8 Asts: Gramajo 9 | Boxscore | Pts: Ayarza 22; Rebs: Sanchez 5 Asts: Liz 6 | Arena: Palacio Peñarol; Referees: Carmelo de la Rosa Alvarez (PUR), Alan Dos Santos (BRA), Fernando Leite (BRA) |

==== Final ====
| 3 December 2023 | Titanes de Barranquilla (Colombia) | 72–81 | (Argentina) Instituto | Montevideo |
| 21:40 | Scoring by quarter: 22–21, 24–13, 11–30, 15–17 |
| | Pts: Rodriguez 17; Rebs: Vargas 15; Asts: Tello 6 | Boxscore | Pts: Jefferson 23; Rebs: Jefferson 12; Asts: Vildoza 9 | Arena: Palacio Peñarol; Referees: Julio Anaya (PAN), Andres Bartel (URU), Kristian Paez (ECU) |

== Individual awards ==
The winners of the individual awards were announced after the Grand Final on 3 December.

=== MVP ===
- (United States) Nathan Hoover (Instituto)

=== All-Tournament Team ===
- SG (United States) Nathan Hoover (Instituto)
- PG (United States) Joshua Webster (Gimnasia y Esgrima (CR))
- PF (Panama) Josimar Ayarza (Caribbean Storm)
- F (United States) Bryan Jefferson (Instituto)
- C (Dominican Republic) Eloy Vargas (Titanes de Barranquilla)
