= 2002 Liga Sudamericana de Básquetbol =

Liga Sudamericana de Básquetbol
- Season: 2002
- Dates: 20 February – 2 May 2002
- Teams: 16

Finals
- Champions: (Argentina) Libertad
- Runners-up: (Brazil) Vasco da Gama
- Semifinalists: (Venezuela) Cocodrilos de Caracas (Argentina) Estudiantes de Olavarría

The 2002 Liga Sudamericana de Básquetbol, or 2002 FIBA South American League, was the seventh edition of the top-tier tournament for basketball teams from South America. The tournament began on 20 February 2001 and finished on 1 May 2002. Argentine team Libertad won their first title, defeating Vasco da Gama in the Grand Finals.

== Format ==
Teams were split into four groups of four teams each, and played each other in a round-robin format. The top two teams from each group advanced to the final stage, a best-of-three direct playoff elimination in the quarterfinals and the semifinals, and a best-of-five elimination series in the Grand Finals, where the champion was decided.

== Teams ==
Country	Team
Argentina	Estudiantes de Olavarría
Argentina	Gimnasia y Esgrima de Comodoro Rivadavia
Argentina	Libertad
Bolivia	Real Santa Cruz
Brazil	COC/Ribeirão Preto
Brazil	Franca
Brazil	Vasco da Gama
Chile	Llanquihue
Chile	Valdivia
Colombia	Piratas de Bogotá
Ecuador	Mavort
Paraguay	San José
Peru	Regatas Lima
Uruguay	Biguá
Uruguay	Cordón
Venezuela	Cocodrilos de Caracas

== Group stage ==
=== Group A ===
Pos	Team	Pld	W	L	Pts	Qualification
1	(Brazil) Vasco da Gama	3	3	0	6	Advances to final stage
2	(Uruguay) Biguá	3	2	1	5	Advances to final stage
3	(Argentina) Gimnasia y Esgrima de Comodoro Rivadavia	3	1	2	4	
4	(Chile) Llanquihue	3	0	3	3	

Source: FIBA Archive

20 February 2002	Vasco da Gama (Brazil)	91–81	(Argentina) Gimnasia y Esgrima de Comodoro Rivadavia	Montevideo, Uruguay

20 February 2002	Biguá (Uruguay)	91–68	(Chile) 'CD Provincial Llanquihue'	Montevideo, Uruguay

21 February 2002	Biguá (Uruguay)	86–68	(Argentina) Gimnasia y Esgrima de Comodoro Rivadavia	Montevideo, Uruguay

21 February 2002	CD Provincial Llanquihue (Chile)	59–109	(Brazil) Vasco da Gama	Montevideo, Uruguay

22 February 2002	Biguá (Uruguay)	71–75	(Brazil) Vasco da Gama	Montevideo, Uruguay

22 February 2002	CD Provincial Llanquihue (Chile)	80–95	(Argentina) Gimnasia y Esgrima de Comodoro Rivadavia	Montevideo, Uruguay

=== Group B ===
Pos	Team	Pld	W	L	Pts	Qualification
1	(Argentina) Libertad	3	2	1	5	Advances to final stage
2	(Paraguay) San José	3	2	1	5	Advances to final stage
3	(Uruguay) Cordón	3	2	1	5	
4	(Bolivia) Real Santa Cruz	3	0	3	3	

Source: FIBA Archive

2 March 2002	Club Atlético Cordón (Uruguay)	66–84	(Argentina) Libertad	Asunción, Paraguay

2 March 2002	Deportivo San José (Paraguay)	82–66	(Bolivia) Real Santa Cruz	Asunción, Paraguay

3 March 2002	Club Atlético Cordón (Uruguay)	107–73	(Bolivia) Real Santa Cruz	Asunción, Paraguay

3 March 2002	Deportivo San José (Paraguay)	77–76	(Argentina) Libertad	Asunción, Paraguay

4 March 2002	Libertad (Argentina)	94–74	(Bolivia) Real Santa Cruz	Asunción, Paraguay

4 March 2002	Deportivo San José (Paraguay)	87–94	(Uruguay) Club Atlético Cordón	Asunción, Paraguay

=== Group C ===
Pos	Team	Pld	W	L	Pts	Qualification
1	(Argentina) Estudiantes de Olavarría	3	3	0	6	Advances to final stage
2	(Brazil) COC/Ribeirão Preto	3	2	1	5	Advances to final stage
3	(Chile) Valdivia	3	1	2	4	
4	(Peru) Regatas Lima	3	0	3	3	

Source: FIBA Archive

28 February 2002	Valdivia (Chile)	92–100	(Argentina) Estudiantes de Olavarría	São Paulo, Brazil

28 February 2002	COC/Ribeirão Preto (Brazil)	89–72	(Peru) Regatas Lima	São Paulo, Brazil

1 March 2002	COC/Ribeirão Preto (Brazil)	114–71	(Chile) Valdivia	São Paulo, Brazil

1 March 2002	Estudiantes de Olavarría (Argentina)	100–81	(Peru) Regatas Lima	São Paulo, Brazil

2 March 2002	Valdivia (Chile)	97–94	(Peru) Regatas Lima	São Paulo, Brazil

2 March 2002	COC/Ribeirão Preto (Brazil)	86–102	(Argentina) Estudiantes de Olavarría	São Paulo, Brazil

=== Group D ===
Pos	Team	Pld	W	L	Pts	Qualification
1	(Colombia) Cocodrilos de Caracas	3	2	1	5	Advances to final stage
2	(Ecuador) Mavort	3	2	1	5	Advances to final stage
3	(Brazil) Franca	3	2	1	5	
4	(Colombia) Piratas de Bogotá	3	0	3	3	

Source: FIBA Archive

23 February 2002	Mavort (Ecuador)	102–70	(Colombia) Piratas de Bogotá	Quito, Ecuador

23 February 2002	Franca (Brazil)	107–121	(Venezuela) Cocodrilos de Caracas	Quito, Ecuador

24 February 2002	Franca (Brazil)	102–70	(Colombia) Piratas de Bogotá	Quito, Ecuador

24 February 2002	Mavort (Ecuador)	110–106	(Venezuela) Cocodrilos de Caracas	Quito, Ecuador

25 February 2002	Cocodrilos de Caracas (Venezuela)	138–70	(Colombia) Piratas de Bogotá	Quito, Ecuador

25 February 2002	Mavort (Ecuador)	108–112	(Brazil) Franca	Quito, Ecuador

== Final stage ==
Quarterfinals
(Brazil) Vasco da Gama	2
(Paraguay) San José	0
(Venezuela) Cocodrilos de Caracas	2
(Brazil) COC/Ribeirão Preto	1
(Argentina) Estudiantes de Olavarría	2
(Ecuador) Mavort	0
(Argentina) Libertad	2
(Uruguay) Biguá	1

Semifinals
(Brazil) Vasco da Gama	2
(Venezuela) Cocodrilos de Caracas	0
(Argentina) Estudiantes de Olavarría	1
(Argentina) Libertad	2

Grand Finals
(Brazil) Vasco da Gama	1
(Argentina) Libertad	3

=== Quarterfinals ===
==== Game 1 ====
11 March 2002	Biguá (Uruguay)	101–96 (Series: 1–0)	(Argentina) Libertad	Montevideo, Uruguay
	Scoring by quarter: 34–32, 24–24, 24–26, 19–14
	Pts: Rovira 20		Pts: Sucatzky 29	Referees: Carlos Pellisario (BRA), José Piovesan (BRA)

13 March 2002	Mavort (Ecuador)	69–89 (Series: 0–1)	(Argentina) Estudiantes de Olavarría	Quito, Ecuador

13 March 2002	San José (Paraguay)	79–89 (Series: 0–1)	(Brazil) Vasco da Gama	Asunción, Paraguay

21 March 2002	COC/Ribeirão Preto (Brazil)	107–104 (Series: 1–0)	(Venezuela) Cocodrilos de Caracas	Rio de Janeiro, Brazil

==== Game 2 ====
19 March 2002	Vasco da Gama (Brazil)	104–73 (Series: 2–0)	(Paraguay) San José	Asunción, Paraguay

19 March 2002	Libertad (Argentina)	101–96 (Series: 1–1)	(Uruguay) Biguá	Sunchales, Argentina
				Arena: Hogar de los Tigres

23 March 2002	Estudiantes de Olavarría (Argentina)	109–88 (Series: 2–0)	(Ecuador) Mavort	Olavarría, Argentina
				Arena: Parque Carlos Guerrero

26 March 2002	Cocodrilos de Caracas (Venezuela)	85–76 (Series: 1–1)	(Brazil) COC/Ribeirão Preto	Caracas, Venezuela

==== Game 3 ====
22 March 2002	Libertad (Argentina)	99–84 (Series: 2–1)	(Uruguay) Biguá	Sunchales, Argentina
				Arena: Hogar de los Tigres

27 March 2002	Cocodrilos de Caracas (Venezuela)	92–84 (Series: 2–1)	(Brazil) COC/Ribeirão Preto	Caracas, Venezuela

=== Semifinals ===
==== Game 1 ====
4 April 2002	Cocodrilos de Caracas (Venezuela)	109–116 (Series: 1–0)	(Brazil) Vasco da Gama	Caracas, Venezuela
				Referees: Daniel Ramallo (ARG), Alejandro Rodrigo (ARG)

5 April 2002	Libertad (Argentina)	97–80 (Series: 1–0)	(Argentina) Estudiantes de Olavarría	Sunchales, Argentina
	Scoring by quarter: 32–29, 27–10, 13–19, 25–22
	Pts: Ceruti 26		Pts: Logrippo 24	Arena: Hogar de los Tigres

==== Game 2 ====
11 April 2002	Vasco da Gama (Brazil)	104–90 (Series: 2–0)	(Venezuela) Cocodrilos de Caracas	Rio de Janeiro, Brazil

12 April 2002	Estudiantes de Olavarría (Argentina)	100–88 (Series: 1–1)	(Argentina) Libertad	Olavarría, Argentina
	Pts: Quinteros 20		Pts: González 21	Arena: Parque Carlos Guerrero

==== Game 3 ====
13 April 2002	Estudiantes de Olavarría (Argentina)	100–106 (Series: 1–2)	(Argentina) Libertad	Olavarría, Argentina
				Arena: Parque Carlos Guerrero

=== Grand Finals ===
23 April 2002	Vasco da Gama (Brazil)	78–77 (Series: 1–0)	(Argentina) Libertad	Rio de Janeiro, Brazil
				Arena: Ginásio Tijuca Tênis Clube

24 April 2002	Vasco da Gama (Brazil)	81–83 (Series: 1–1)	(Argentina) Libertad	Rio de Janeiro, Brazil
				Arena: Ginásio Tijuca Tênis Clube; Referees: Carlos Gómez (URU), Raúl Gondsedorf (URU)

30 April 2002	Libertad (Argentina)	100–99 (Series: 2–1)	(Brazil) Vasco da Gama	Sunchales, Argentina
	Pts: Ceruti 25		Pts: Rogério, Sandro 26	Arena: Hogar de los Tigres; Referees: Jorge Tovar (VEN), David Pappo (VEN)

1 May 2002	Libertad (Argentina)	95–85 (Series: 3–1)	(Brazil) Vasco da Gama	Sunchales, Argentina
	Pts: Ceruti 24		Pts: Sandro 25	Arena: Hogar de los Tigres; Referees: Jorge Tovar (VEN), David Pappo (VEN)

== Finals rosters ==
Libertad Sunchales: Facundo Sucatzky, Mariano Cerutti, Esteban Pérez, Jorge Benítez, Román González - Sebastián Acosta. Coach: Daniel Rodríguez

Vasco da Gama: Helinho (basketball), Jamison Costa, Rogério Klafke, Jose Mingão, Sandro Varejão - Chuí. Coach: Hélio Rubens

== Season MVP ==
- (Argentina) Mariano Cerutti
