= Basketball Champions League Americas =

Basketball league

- Organising body: FIBA Americas
- Founded: 24 September 2019; 7 years ago
- First season: 2019–20
- Country: FIBA Americas member countries
- Confederation: FIBA Americas
- Number of teams: 12
- Level on pyramid: 1
- Promotion to: Intercontinental Cup
- Current champions: (Argentina) Boca Juniors (1st title) (2025–26)
- Most championships: (Argentina) Quimsa (Brazil) Flamengo (2 titles)
- TV partners: YouTube (live games occasionally)
- Website: BCLAmericas.basketball
- 2025–26 Basketball Champions League Americas

The Basketball Champions League Americas (BCLA) (Spanish: Liga de Campeones de Baloncesto de las Américas, Portuguese: Liga dos Campeões de Basquetebol das Américas) is Pan-America's premier men's basketball club competition. Founded in 2019, it replaced the FIBA Americas League as the highest level league in the Americas. The winner of each year's competition qualifies to the annual FIBA Intercontinental Cup.

Each season exists of 12 teams that qualify through their domestic leagues and the league is typically organized between December and April of the following calendar year.

Thus far the league has been won by four different teams. Argentine team Quimsa and Brazilian team Flamengo are the only teams to win the championship twice.

== History ==
=== Background ===
The first panamerican tournament for men's clubs was held in 1993. The competition lasted until 2000 and in 2007 FIBA started a new league and not a tournament: the top South American teams would no longer play in the Liga Sudamericana.

=== Launch ===
On 24 September 2019, FIBA launched the Panamerican competition, which derives its name and branding from the European Basketball Champions League. The competition replaced the FIBA Americas League as premier league in the Americas, President Horacio Muratore stated: "This is not a succession of Liga de las Américas, but rather a new product of our development project that will foster a balance between representation and quality". The competition consisted of twelve teams, which had to qualify through their domestic leagues. The inaugural season started on October 28, 2019. On October 30, 2021, Quimsa won the inaugural championship after winning the final in Montevideo. Canadian clubs Edmonton Stingers and Brampton Honey Badgers are the only North American teams to participate in the competition so far.

=== Panamerican competitions (1993-present) ===
Competitions historically considered as the top on Panamerican level
Timespan	League	Note(s)
1993-2000	Campeonato Panamericano de Clubes de Básquetbol	
2007-2019	FIBA Americas League	
2019–present	Basketball Champions League Americas (BCLA)	

== Format ==
As for the competition's format, the first phase of the BCLA will feature four groups of three teams each, with two qualifying teams per group that move on to the Quarter-Finals, which will be a best-of-three series. The Semi-Finals and the Final will also be decided in a best-of-three format.

Clubs qualify for the competition mostly based on performance in their national leagues and cup competitions. Although exceptional, some teams can be wildcarded.

== Results ==
=== List of seasons ===
Edition	Year	Hosts	Champions	Score and Venue	Runners-up	Third place	Score and Venue	Fourth place	No. of teams
1	2019–20	(Uruguay); Montevideo	(Argentina); Quimsa	92–86 (Note: The 2020 final originally consisted of a best-of-three series, but it was changed to a single game in a neutral venue due to the COVID-19 pandemic.); Antel Arena, Montevideo	(Brazil); Flamengo	(Argentina) San Lorenzo and (Argentina) Instituto			12
2	2021	(Nicaragua); Managua	(Brazil); Flamengo	84–80; Alexis Arguello Sports Complex, Managua	(Nicaragua); Real Estelí	(Brazil); Minas	75–58; Alexis Arguello Sports Complex, Managua	(Brazil); São Paulo	12
3	2021–22	(Brazil); Rio de Janeiro	(Brazil); São Paulo	98–84; Carioca Arena 1, Rio de Janeiro	(Uruguay); Biguá	(Brazil); 123 Minas	91–81; Carioca Arena 1, Rio de Janeiro	(Argentina); Quimsa	12
4	2022–23	(Brazil); Franca	(Brazil); Sesi Franca	88–79; Pedrocão, Franca	(Brazil); Flamengo	(Brazil); 123 Minas	94–81; Pedrocão, Franca	(Argentina); Quimsa	12
5	2023–24	(Argentina) Santiago del Estero	(Argentina); Quimsa	92–80; Estadio Ciudad, Santiago del Estero	(Brazil); Flamengo	(Mexico); Halcones de Xalapa	101–99 (OT); Estadio Ciudad, Santiago del Estero	(Uruguay); Hebraica Macabi	12
6	2024–25	(Brazil); Rio de Janeiro	(Brazil); Flamengo	83–57; Ginásio do Maracanãzinho, Rio de Janeiro	(Argentina); Boca Juniors	(Brazil); Sesi Franca	74–59; Ginásio do Maracanãzinho, Rio de Janeiro	(Argentina); Instituto	12
7	2025–26	(Argentina) Buenos Aires	(Argentina); Boca Juniors	86–72; Estadio Obras Sanitarias, Buenos Aires	(Brazil); Sesi Franca	(Uruguay); Nacional	94–65; Estadio Obras Sanitarias, Buenos Aires	(Brazil); Flamengo	12

== Performance ==
=== Medals ===
Rank	Nation	Gold	Silver	Bronze	Total
1	Brazil	4	4	4	12
2	Argentina	3	1	2	6
3	Uruguay	0	1	1	2
4	Nicaragua	0	1	0	1
5	Mexico	0	0	1	1
Totals (5 entries)		7	7	8	22

=== Performance by club ===
Performances in the BCL Americas by club
Club	Titles	Runners-up	Years won	Years runners-up
(Brazil) Flamengo	2	3	2021, 2025	2020, 2023, 2024
(Argentina) Quimsa	2	—	2020, 2024	—
(Brazil) Franca	1	1	2023	2026
(Argentina) Boca Juniors	1	1	2026	2025
(Brazil) São Paulo	1	—	2022	—
(Nicaragua) Real Estelí	—	1	—	2021
(Uruguay) Biguá	—	1	—	2022

=== Performance by country ===
Performance by nation
Country	Titles	Runners-up	Years won	Years runners-up
Brazil	4	4	2021, 2022, 2023, 2025	2020, 2023, 2024, 2026
Argentina	3	1	2020, 2024, 2026	2025
Nicaragua	—	1	—	2021
Uruguay	—	1	—	2022

=== Performance by head coach ===
Only one head coach has appeared in multiple finals, as Gustavo de Conti of Flamengo coached in four.

Performance by head coach
Head coach	Winner	Runner-up	Years won	Years runner-up
(Brazil) Gustavo de Conti	1	3	2021	2020, 2023, 2024
(Argentina) Jorge Sebastián González	1	—	2020	—
(Brazil) Bruno Mortari	1	—	2022	—
(Brazil) Helinho	1	—	2023	—
(Argentina) Leandro Ramella	1	—	2024	—
(Argentina) Sergio Hernández	1	—	2025	—
(Argentina) Nicolás Casalánguida	1	—	2026	—
(Puerto Rico) David Rosario	—	1	—	2021
(Uruguay) Diego Gutiérrez	—	1	—	2022
(Argentina) Gonzalo Pérez	—	1	—	2025

== All-time participants ==
The following is a list of clubs who have played in the Basketball Champions League Americas at any time since its formation in 2019 to the current season.

1st	Champions
2nd	Runners-up
3rd	Third place
4th	Fourth place
SF	Semifinalists
QF	Quarterfinalists
RS	Regular season
Q	Qualified for upcoming season

Team	20	21	22	23	24	25	26	27	Total seasons
(Argentina) Boca Juniors	—N/a	—N/a	QF	—N/a	RS	2nd	1st	—N/a	4
(Argentina) Ferro Carril Oeste	—N/a	—N/a	—N/a	—N/a	—N/a	—N/a	—N/a	Q	1
(Argentina) Gimnasia y Esgrima (CR)	—N/a	—N/a	—N/a	—N/a	—N/a	—N/a	—N/a	Q	1
(Argentina) Instituto	SF	RS	—N/a	RS	—N/a	4th	QF	—N/a	5
(Argentina) Obras Sanitarias	—N/a	RS	RS	RS	QF	—N/a	RS	—N/a	5
(Argentina) Quimsa	1st	QF	4th	4th	1st	QF	—N/a	Q	7
(Argentina) San Lorenzo	SF	QF	—N/a	—N/a	—N/a	—N/a	—N/a	—N/a	2
(Brazil) Flamengo	2nd	1st	QF	2nd	2nd	1st	4th	—N/a	7
(Brazil) Franca	QF	QF	—N/a	1st	QF	3rd	2nd	Q	7
(Brazil) Minas	—N/a	3rd	3rd	3rd	—N/a	QF	QF	Q	6
(Brazil) Mogi das Cruzes	QF	—N/a	—N/a	—N/a	—N/a	—N/a	—N/a	—N/a	1
(Brazil) Pinheiros	—N/a	—N/a	—N/a	—N/a	—N/a	—N/a	—N/a	Q	1
(Brazil) São Paulo	—N/a	4th	1st	—N/a	RS	—N/a	—N/a	—N/a	3
(Canada) Brampton Honey Badgers	—N/a	—N/a	—N/a	RS	—N/a	—N/a	—N/a	—N/a	1
(Canada) Edmonton Stingers	—N/a	—N/a	RS	—N/a	—N/a	—N/a	—N/a	—N/a	1
(Chile) Colegio Los Leones de Quilpué	—N/a	—N/a	—N/a	—N/a	—N/a	RS	—N/a	—N/a	1
(Chile) CD Valdivia	RS	—N/a	—N/a	—N/a	—N/a	—N/a	—N/a	—N/a	1
(Chile) Universidad de Concepción	—N/a	RS	RS	QF	RS	—N/a	RS	—N/a	5
(Colombia) Caimanes del Llano	—N/a	—N/a	—N/a	—N/a	—N/a	—N/a	RS	—N/a	1
(Colombia) Paisas Basketball	—N/a	—N/a	—N/a	—N/a	—N/a	QF	QF	—N/a	2
(Colombia) Titanes de Barranquilla	—N/a	RS	—N/a	—N/a	—N/a	—N/a	—N/a	—N/a	1
(Colombia) Toros del Valle	—N/a	—N/a	—N/a	—N/a	—N/a	RS	—N/a	—N/a	1
(Mexico) Astros de Jalisco	—N/a	—N/a	—N/a	—N/a	—N/a	—N/a	QF	Q	2
(Mexico) Capitanes	RS	—N/a	—N/a	—N/a	—N/a	—N/a	—N/a	—N/a	1
(Mexico) Halcones de Xalapa	—N/a	—N/a	—N/a	—N/a	3rd	—N/a	—N/a	—N/a	1
(Mexico) Fuerza Regia	QF	—N/a	—N/a	—N/a	—N/a	—N/a	—N/a	—N/a	1
(Mexico) Libertadores de Querétaro	—N/a	—N/a	—N/a	QF	—N/a	—N/a	—N/a	—N/a	1
(Nicaragua) Real Estelí	QF	2nd	QF	QF	QF	QF	—N/a	Q	7
(Panama) Caballos de Coclé	—N/a	QF	—N/a	—N/a	—N/a	—N/a	—N/a	—N/a	1
(Panama) Toros de Chiriquí	—N/a	—N/a	—N/a	—N/a	—N/a	RS	—N/a	—N/a	1
(Puerto Rico) Cangrejeros de Santurce	—N/a	—N/a	QF	—N/a	—N/a	—N/a	—N/a	—N/a	1
(Uruguay) Aguada	RS	—N/a	—N/a	—N/a	—N/a	—N/a	RS	Q	3
(Uruguay) Biguá	RS	—N/a	2nd	RS	—N/a	RS	—N/a	Q	5
(Uruguay) Hebraica Macabi	—N/a	—N/a	—N/a	—N/a	4th	—N/a	—N/a	—N/a	1
(Uruguay) Nacional	—N/a	—N/a	RS	—N/a	QF	—N/a	3rd	—N/a	3
(Uruguay) Peñarol	—N/a	—N/a	—N/a	QF	—N/a	—N/a	—N/a	Q	2
(Venezuela) Gladiadores de Anzoátegui	—N/a	—N/a	—N/a	—N/a	RS	—N/a	—N/a	—N/a	1
(Venezuela) Guaiqueríes de Margarita	—N/a	—N/a	—N/a	—N/a	—N/a	—N/a	—N/a	Q	1

== All-time table ==
As of the end of the 2025–26 season.

Rank	Club	SP	Pld	W	L	C	RU	3rd	4th	QF	RS
1	(Brazil) Flamengo	7	64	50	14	2	3	0	1	1	0
2	(Brazil) Franca	6	53	37	16	1	1	1	0	3	0
3	(Argentina) Quimsa	6	54	31	23	2	0	0	2	2	0
4	(Brazil) Minas	5	46	27	19	0	0	3	0	2	0
5	(Nicaragua) Real Estelí	6	49	27	22	0	1	0	0	5	0
6	(Argentina) Boca Juniors	4	34	21	13	1	1	0	0	1	1
7	(Argentina) Instituto	5	39	16	23	0	0	1	1	1	2
8	(Brazil) São Paulo	3	22	15	7	1	0	0	1	0	1
9	(Uruguay) Nacional	3	25	14	11	0	0	1	0	1	1
10	(Argentina) San Lorenzo	2	15	11	4	0	0	1	0	1	0
11	(Uruguay) Biguá	4	25	8	17	0	1	0	0	0	3
12	(Argentina) Obras Sanitarias	5	30	8	22	0	0	0	0	1	4
13	(Mexico) Halcones de Xalapa	1	11	7	4	0	0	1	0	0	0
14	(Mexico) Astros de Jalisco	1	8	6	2	0	0	0	0	1	0
15	(Colombia) Paisas	2	16	6	10	0	0	0	0	2	0
16	(Mexico) Libertadores de Querétaro	1	8	5	3	0	0	0	0	1	0
17	(Uruguay) Hebraica Macabi	1	11	4	7	0	0	0	1	0	0
18	(Chile) Universidad de Concepción	5	30	4	26	0	0	0	0	1	4
19	(Canada) Edmonton Stingers	1	6	3	3	0	0	0	0	0	1
20	(Panama) Caballos de Coclé	1	7	3	4	0	0	0	0	1	0
21	(Puerto Rico) Cangrejeros de Santurce	1	7	3	4	0	0	0	0	1	0
22	(Brazil) Mogi das Cruzes	1	6	2	4	0	0	0	0	1	0
23	(Venezuela) Gladiadores de Anzoátegui	1	6	2	4	0	0	0	0	0	1
24	(Colombia) Titanes de Barranquilla	1	6	2	4	0	0	0	0	0	1
25	(Colombia) Toros del Valle	1	6	2	4	0	0	0	0	0	1
26	(Uruguay) Peñarol	1	8	2	6	0	0	0	0	1	0
27	(Uruguay) Aguada	2	10	2	8	0	0	0	0	0	2
28	(Mexico) Capitanes	1	4	1	3	0	0	0	0	0	1
29	(Mexico) Fuerza Regia	1	6	1	5	0	0	0	0	1	0
30	(Canada) Brampton Honey Badgers	1	6	0	6	0	0	0	0	0	1
31	(Colombia) Caimanes del Llano	1	6	0	6	0	0	0	0	0	1
32	(Chile) CD Valdivia	1	4	0	4	0	0	0	0	0	1
33	(Chile) Colegio Los Leones de Quilpué	1	6	0	6	0	0	0	0	0	1
34	(Panama) Toros de Chiriquí	1	6	0	6	0	0	0	0	0	1

== Awards ==
=== Season MVP ===
Season	Player	Nationality	Club
2019-20	Robinson	United States	(Argentina) Quimsa
2021	Hettsheimeir	Brazil	(Brazil) Flamengo
2021-22	Caboclo	Brazil	(Brazil) São Paulo
2022-23	Mariano	Brazil	(Brazil) Franca
2023-24	Frank Hassell	United States	(Uruguay) Hebraica Macabi
2024-25	Borges	Brazil	(Brazil) Flamengo

=== Final MVP ===
Season	Player	Nationality	Club
2020	Robinson	United States	(Argentina) Quimsa
2021	Hettsheimeir	Brazil	(Brazil) Flamengo
2022	Caboclo	Brazil	(Brazil) São Paulo
2023	Mariano	Brazil	(Brazil) Franca
2024	Robinson (2)	United States	(Argentina) Quimsa
2025	Borges	Brazil	(Brazil) Flamengo
2026	Francisco Cáffaro	Argentina	(Argentina) Boca Juniors

== Statistical leaders ==
=== Topscorer ===
Season	Player	Nationality	Club	PPG
2019-20	Dwayne Davis	United States	(Brazil) Instituto ACC	22.0
2021	Jezreel De Jesús	Puerto Rico	(Nicaragua) Real Estelí	20.1
2021-22	Donald Sims	United States	(Uruguay) Biguá	24.8
2022-23	Ismael Romero	Puerto Rico	(Mexico) Libertadores de Querétaro	21.3
2023-24	Andre Spight	United States	(Argentina) Obras	18.2
2024-25	Victor Luiz	Dominican Republic	(Colombia) Paisas de Medellin	23.7
2025-26	Trey Burke	United States	(Mexico) Astros de Jalisco	19.3

=== Rebounds ===
Season	Player	Nationality	Club	RPG
2019-20	Alexandre De Sousa	Brazil	(Brazil) Mogi das Cruzes	8.8
2021	Ernesto Oglivie	Panama	(Panama) Caballos de Coclé	9.7
2021-22	Ismael Romero	United States	(Nicaragua) Real Estelí	11.1
2022-23	Luis Santos	Dominican Republic	(Uruguay) Biguá	10.8
2023-24	Eric Anderson	United States	(Uruguay) Nacional	10.0
2024-25	Eloy Vargas	Dominican Republic	(Colombia) Paisas	10.0
2025-26	Connor Zinaich	United States	(Uruguay) Nacional	9.7

=== Assists ===
Season	Player	Nationality	Club	APG
2019-20	Franco Balbi	Argentina	(Brazil) Flamengo	6.4
2021	Fernando Zurbriggen	Argentina	(Argentina) Obras	6.3
2021-22	Santiago Vidal	Uruguay	(Uruguay) Bigua	9.0
2022-23	Alexy Borges	Brazil	(Brazil) Minas Tenis	6.4
2023-24	Luciano Parodi	Uruguay	(Uruguay) Hebraica Macabi	6.7
2024-25	Alexey Borges	Brazil	(Brazil) Flamengo	8.0
2025-26	Pedro Barral	Argentina	(Argentina) Obras Basket	5.7

=== Index rating ===
Season	Player	Nationality	Club	RPG
2019-20	Danilo Fuzaro	Brazil	(Brazil) Mogi das Cruzes	22.0
2021	Fernando Zurbriggen	Argentina	(Argentina) Obras	21.8
2021-22	Bruno Caboclo	Brazil	(Brazil) São Paulo	32.8
2022-23	Luis Santos	Dominican Republic	(Uruguay) Biguá	25.5
2023-24	Frank Hassell	United States	(Uruguay) Hebraica Macabi	22.6
2024-25	Alexey Borges	Brazil	(Brazil) Flamengo	21.6
2025-26	Connor Zinaich	United States	(Uruguay) Nacional	21.6

== Broadcasting rights ==
In selected South American countries, the tournament aired live on DSports. In Puerto Rico, available via WAPA-TV. In the United States, available via FanDuel TV. In Brazil, available via Globo's SporTV. For countries without broadcasting rights, BCLA also available via Basketball Champions League Americas YouTube channel.

== Americas' top tier competitions ==
- 1993-2000: Panamerican Basketball Championship (es)
- 2000-2007: none
- 2007-2019: FIBA Americas League
- 2019-present: Basketball Champions League Americas

== See also ==
- FIBA Americas League
- Campeonato Panamericano de Clubes de Básquetbol
- Basketball Champions League
- FIBA Intercontinental Cup
