= Franca Basquetebol Clube =

Brazilian basketball team

Sesi Franca
- Leagues: NBB; Americas League
- Founded: 10 May 1959; 67 years ago
- Arena: Ginásio Pedrocão
- Capacity: 7,500
- Location: Franca, São Paulo state, Brazil
- President: Luís Aurélio Prior
- Head coach: Helinho
- Championships: 1 FIBA Intercontinental Cup; 4 Pan American Club Championships; 6 South American Club Championships; 13 Brazilian Championships
- Website: francabasquete.com.br
Home	Away

Franca Basquetebol Clube (English: Franca Basketball Club), most known as Franca, or Sesi Franca for sponsorship reasons, is a Brazilian men's professional basketball club that is based in Franca, São Paulo state. Franca is the most decorated team in Brazilian basketball history, having won 13 national championships.

The club was founded on 10 May 1959, and home games are played at the Ginásio Pedrocão. Franca won the South American Club Championship six times, the Pan American Championship four times, and has won the FIBA Intercontinental Cup in 2023.

== History ==
The club was a two-time FIBA Intercontinental Cup runner-up: in 1975 (as Esporte Clube Amazonas Franca), and in 1980 (as Associação Atlética Francana).

On 16 April 2023, Franca won the 2022–23 season of the Basketball Champions League Americas.

== Achievements and honors ==
=== Worldwide ===
- FIBA Intercontinental Cup
  - Champions (1): 2023
  - Runners-up (2): 1975, 1980

=== Latin America ===
- Pan American Club Championship
  - Champions (4): 1993, 1994, 1997, 1999 (record)
  - Runners-up (1): 1996

=== Continental ===
- South American Club Championship
  - Champions (6): 1974, 1975, 1977, 1980, 1990, 1991
  - Runners-up (3): 1978, 1992, 1993
- FIBA South American League
  - Champions (1): 2018
  - Runners-up (2): 1998, 2007
- Basketball Champions League Americas
  - Champions (1): 2022–23

=== National ===
- Brazilian Championship
  - Champions (15): 1971, 1974, 1975, 1980, 1981 (II), 1990, 1991, 1993, 1997, 1998, 1999, 2022, 2023, 2024, 2025(record)
  - Runners-up (9): 1979, 1981 (I), 1982, 1986, 1989, 1994, 2007, 2011, 2019
- Super 8 Cup
  - Winners (2): 2020, 2023
  - Runners-up (1): 2018
- Brazilian Supercup
  - Winners (1): 2008

=== Regional ===
- São Paulo State Championship
  - Champions (17 - record): 1973, 1975, 1976, 1977, 1988, 1990, 1992, 1997, 2000, 2006, 2007, 2018, 2019, 2020, 2022, 2024, 2025
  - Runners-up (13): 1964, 1970, 1971, 1974, 1978, 1979, 1980, 1991, 1993, 1996, 1999, 2008, 2017, 2021

== Current roster ==
Note: Flags indicate national team eligibility at FIBA-sanctioned events. Players may hold other non-FIBA nationalities not displayed.

Franca roster
Players
Coaches

Pos.	No.	Nat.	Name	Ht.	Wt.	Age
F/C	3	(Brazil)	Márcio Santos	2.02 m (6 ft 8 in)	100 kg (220 lb)	23 – 2 November 2002
CG	6	(Argentina)	Santiago Scala	1.85 m (6 ft 1 in)	80 kg (176 lb)	35 – 6 February 1991
SF	7	(Brazil)	Jhonatan Luz	1.96 m (6 ft 5 in)	92 kg (203 lb)	39 – 10 February 1987
PF	9	(Brazil)	Lucas Dias	2.07 m (6 ft 9 in)	104 kg (229 lb)	31 – 6 July 1995
C	11	(Brazil)	Edu Marília	2.07 m (6 ft 9 in)	83 kg (183 lb)	24 – 28 December 2001
PG	19	(Venezuela)	Heissler Guillent	1.86 m (6 ft 1 in)	95 kg (209 lb)	39 – 17 December 1986
C	21	(Brazil)	Wesley Castro	2.00 m (6 ft 7 in)	105 kg (231 lb)	30 – 15 October 1995
SG	32	(United States)	David Jackson	1.92 m (6 ft 4 in)	94 kg (207 lb)	44 – 12 August 1982
F	43	(Brazil)	Nathan Mariano	2.01 m (6 ft 7 in)	91 kg (201 lb)	23 – 16 September 2003
G/F	58	(Brazil)	Zu Júnior	1.92 m (6 ft 4 in)	86 kg (190 lb)	23 – 11 September 2003
SF	73	(United States)	Charles Hinkle	1.96 m (6 ft 5 in)	93 kg (205 lb)	38 – 11 March 1988

Head coach

- (Brazil) Helinho

Team manager

- (Brazil) Pablo Costa

Legend

- (C) Team captain
- Injured

- Roster
Updated: 17 August 2023

== Notable players ==
Note: Flags indicate national team eligibility at FIBA-sanctioned events. Players may hold other non-FIBA nationalities not displayed.

Criteria

To appear in this section a player must have either:

- Set a club record or won an individual award while at the club
- Played at least one official international match for their national team at any time
- Played at least one official NBA match at any time.

- (Brazil) Rafael "Bábby" Araújo
- (Brazil) Fúlvio de Assis
- (Brazil) Leandrinho Barbosa
- (Brazil) Murilo Becker
- (Brazil) Vítor Benite
- (Brazil) Roberto "Robertão" José Corrêa
- (Brazil) Lucas Dias
- (Brazil) Gilson Trinidade de Jesus
- (Brazil) Wagner da Silva
- (Brazil) Josuel dos Santos
- (Brazil) Nezinho dos Santos
- (Brazil) Demétrius Ferraciú
- (Brazil) Francisco Sérgio García
- (Brazil) Zé Geraldo
- (Brazil) Jorge Guerra
- (Brazil) Rafael Hettsheimeir
- (Brazil) Rogério Klafke
- (Brazil) Marquinhos Leite
- (Brazil) Didi Louzada
- (Brazil) Sílvio Malvezi
- (Brazil) Rafael Mineiro
- (Brazil) Fernando Minucci
- (Brazil) Adilson Nascimento
- (Brazil) Paulão Prestes
- (Brazil) Hélio Rubens
- (Brazil) Anderson Varejão
- (Brazil) Marcelo Vido
- (Argentina) Marcos Mata
- (Dominican Republic) José Vargas
- (United States) Eddie Basden
- (United States) Dexter Shouse
- (United States) Rocky Smith
- (United States) David Jackson

== Head coaches ==
- (Brazil) Pedro "Pedroca" Morilla Fuentes: (1959–1981)
- (Brazil) Hélio Rubens: (1981–2000)
- (Brazil) Daniel Abrão Wattfy: (2000–2004)
- (Brazil) Marco Aurélio "Chuí" Pegolo dos Santos: (2004–2005)
- (Brazil) Hélio Rubens: (2005–2012)
- (Brazil) Lula Ferreira: (2012–2016)
- (Brazil) Helinho: (2016–present)

== Official club names ==
The club adopted several different names during its history:

- Clube dos Bagres (1959–1971)
- Emmanuel Franca Esporte Clube (1972–1974)
- Esporte Clube Amazonas Franca (1975–1977)
- Associação Atlética Francana (1977–1984)
- Associação Francana de Basquetebol (1984–1988)
- Ravelli Franca Basquetebol (1988–1991)
- Franca Basquetebol Clube (1992–)

Since the foundation of Franca Basquetebol Clube (the club's current form), in 1992, the club has regularly changed its name according to its name sponsor:

- All Star/Franca (1992)
- Satierf/Sabesp/Franca (1993)
- Cosesp/Franca (1994)
- Cougar/Franca (1996)
- Marathon/Franca (1997–2000)
- Unimed/Franca (2000–2001)
- Franca Basquetebol Clube (2001–2004, 2015-)*
- Franca/Petrocrystal/Ferracini (2004–2005)
- Franca/Mariner/Unimed (2005–2006)
- Unimed/Franca (2006–2008)
- Vivo/Franca (2008–2015)
- Sesi/Franca (2017–)

* Without an official sponsor.
