= Instituto ACC (basketball) =

Basketball club in Argentina

Instituto
- Nickname: La Gloria
- Leagues: Liga Nacional de Básquet; Champions League Americas
- Founded: 8 August 1918; 108 years ago
- Arena: Angel Sandrin
- Capacity: 2,000
- Location: Córdoba, Argentina
- Team colors: Red, white
- President: Juan Manuel Cavagliatto
- Vice-president: Martín Leiva
- Team manager: Alejandro Desimone
- Head coach: Sebastián González
- 2025–26 position: 10th
- Website: institutoacc.com.ar/basquet
Home	Away

Instituto Atlético Central Córdoba basketball is the basketball section of the homonymous sports club based in Córdoba, Argentina. The team plays its home games at the Angel Sandrin, which has a capacity for 2,000 people. Instituto plays in the Liga Nacional de Básquet (LNB) and won its first championship in 2022.

After promoting from the La Liga Argentina de Básquet in 2015, Instituo has played in the LNB since. Instituo has won one LNB championship, in 2022 and were runners-up once, in 2018. At the international level, they have reached the semi-finals of the Basketball Champions League Americas in 2020.

== Players ==
=== Current roster ===
As of 2 February 2023.

Note: Flags indicate national team, as has been defined under FIBA eligibility rules. Players may hold more than one non-FIBA nationality.

No.	Pos.	Nat.	Player
1	PG	(Argentina) ARG	Leandro Vildoza
2	SG	(Argentina) ARG	Mateo Chiarini
3	SG	(Argentina) ARG	Fausto Moussa
5	C	(Argentina) ARG	Philip Lockett
7	SG	(Argentina) ARG	Gaston Elias
8	G/F	(Argentina) ARG	Luciano Gonzálvez
9	F	(Argentina) ARG	Bautista Lugarini
10	PG	(Argentina) ARG	Nicolas Copello
12	C	(Dominican Republic) DOM	Emmanuel Labata
13	PG	(Argentina) ARG	Juan Cruz Frontera
17	F	(Argentina) ARG	Josue Santillan Paz
22	SF	(Argentina) ARG	Martin Fernandez
33	PF	(Argentina) ARG	Nicolas Romano
83	C	(Argentina) ARG	Tayavek Gallizzi

== Honours ==
=== National competitions ===
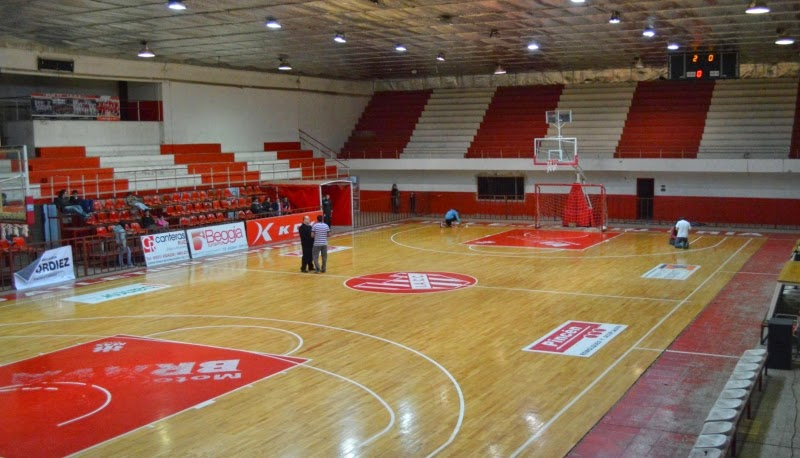
The Angel Sandrin, home arena of Instituto

- Liga Nacional de Básquet
  - Champions (1): 2021–22
    - Runners-up (1): 2018–19
- La Liga Argentina de Básquet
  - Winners (1): 2014–15
- Super Cup
  - Winners (2): 2022, 2025

=== International competitions ===
- Liga Sudamericana de Baloncesto
  - Champions (1): 2023
    - Runners-up (1): 2018
- BCL Americas
  - Semifinalist (1): 2019–20
