= Quimsa =

- Nickname: Fusión
- Leagues: LNB; Champions League Americas
- Founded: 13 August 1989; 37 years ago
- History: Asociación Atlética Quimsa (1989–present)
- Arena: Estadio Ciudad de Santiago del Estero
- Capacity: 4,300
- Location: Santiago del Estero, Argentina
- Team colors
- President: Gerardo Montenegro
- Head coach: Leandro Ramella
- Championships: 2 Champions League Americas; 2 Liga Nacional; 1 Liga Sudamericana; 1 Copa Argentina
Home	Away

Asociación Atlética Quimsa, usually called simply Quimsa, is an Argentine sports club located in the city of Santiago del Estero in the homonymous province.

The club's professional basketball team plays in the Liga Nacional de Básquet (LNB), the top division of Argentine basketball, and Pan-America's premier men's basketball league, the Basketball Champions League Americas. Quimsa has won two continental titles in 2020 and 2024. They have also won two national LNB championships in 2015 and 2023.

Quimsa's home arena is the Estadio Ciudad de Santiago del Estero. Apart from basketball, other activities hosted by the club are cestoball, roller skating, taekwondo and volleyball.

== History ==
Founded in 1989, its name derives from the Quichua word kimsa, meaning three. The club was established as the merger of "Estudiantes Unidos", "Santiago Basketball Club" and "Inti Club", all three historical basketball clubs in Santiago.

In the 2002–03 season Quimsa achieved promotion to Torneo Nacional de Ascenso, the second division of national basketball. In the 2004–05 season, Quimsa played the final to promote, but they lost to La Unión in a playoff match after a 2–2 tie.

Quimsa reached the final in the following season, promoting to LNB although Quimsa also lost to Juventud Sionista, which crowned champion of the second division.

In their first season in the top level of Argentine basketball, Quimsa ended 9°, with 25 wins and 23 losses.

In November 2020, Quimsa won the final of the Basketball Champions League Americas (BCLA), beating Flamengo and being crowned champions of South America.

On April 14, 2024, Quimsa won its second BCLA championship and became the first team to win two league titles. The Final Four was hosted by Quimsa in Santiago del Estero and the final was a rematch with Flamengo. Brandon Robinson was once again named the league MVP.

== Players ==
=== Current roster ===
Quimsa roster
Players
Coaches

Pos.	No.	Nat.	Name	Ht.	Age
G	0	(Argentina)	Collomb, Diego	1.92 m (6 ft 4 in)	21 – 1 October 2004
PG	4	(Argentina)	Amprimo, Romeo	1.78 m (5 ft 10 in)	21 – 19 April 2005
G	6	(Argentina)	Orresta, Sebastián	1.88 m (6 ft 2 in)	33 – 6 May 1993
SG	10	(Argentina)	Solanas, Matías	1.93 m (6 ft 4 in)	27 – 17 December 1998
F	15	(United States)	Robinson, Brandon	1.98 m (6 ft 6 in)	37 – 25 March 1989
F	17	(Argentina)	Basabe, Emiliano	1.96 m (6 ft 5 in)	34 – 2 July 1992
SG	18	(Argentina)	Cavallero, Tomás	1.96 m (6 ft 5 in)	28 – 24 May 1998
SF	20	(Argentina)	Lema, Leonardo	2.01 m (6 ft 7 in)	28 – 20 June 1998
PF	22	(Puerto Rico)	Negrón, Christian	2.01 m (6 ft 7 in)	27 – 24 November 1998
C	25	(Dominican Republic)	Bastardo, Raymon	2.02 m (6 ft 8 in)	24 – 15 February 2002
G/F	33	(Argentina)	Romano, Nicolás	1.99 m (6 ft 6 in)	38 – 1 November 1987
PF	41	(Argentina)	Cogliati, Patricio	2.03 m (6 ft 8 in)	19 – 12 December 2006
C	55	(United States)	Meyinsse, Jerome	2.08 m (6 ft 10 in)	37 – 18 December 1988
G	91	(Brazil) (Argentina)	Figueredo, Diego	1.80 m (5 ft 11 in)	34 – 27 December 1991

Head coach

- (Argentina) Leandro Ramella

Legend

- (C) Team captain
- Injured

- Roster
Updated: 2020-01-01

=== Retired numbers ===
Quimsa's retired numbers
N°	Nat.	Player	Position	Tenure	N° Ret.	Ref.
7	(Argentina)	Nicolás Aguirre	PG	2011–13, 2014–15	2019	
8	(Argentina)	Fernando Small	?	2006–08	2019	
11	(Argentina)	Miguel Cortijo	PG	(none) (Note: Although Cortijo never played for the club, the #11 jersey was retired honoring him as a native of Santiago del Estero, where Quimsa is located in.)	?	
14	(Argentina)	Gabriel Deck	SF	2010–16	2019	

=== Other players ===
Note: Flags indicate national team eligibility at FIBA-sanctioned events. Players may hold other non-FIBA nationalities not displayed.

Criteria

To appear in this section a player must have either:

- Set a club record or won an individual award while at the club
- Played at least one official international match for their national team at any time
- Played at least one official NBA match at any time.

- (Argentina) Nicolás Aguirre
- (United States) Quincy Alexander

== Arena ==
Quimsa plays its home venues at Estadio Ciudad de Santiago del Estero, which have a capacity of 4,300. The stadium was originally used by Club Estudiantes Unidos, one of the three institution that merged to form Quimsa. With the money earned from the sales of Inti Club and Santiago Básquetbol Club (the other two clubs part of the merging), Quimsa refurbished the arena.

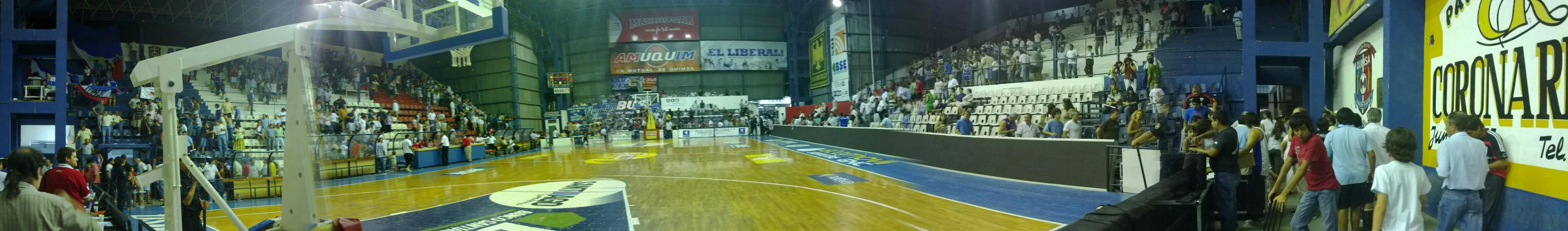
Panoramic view of Estadio Ciudad de Santiago del Estero

== Honours ==
- Liga Nacional (2): 2014-15, 2022–23
- Basketball Champions League Americas (2): 2019–20, 2023–24
- Liga Sudamericana (1): 2009 (II)
- Copa Argentina (1): 2009
