= Basketball at the 2023 Pan American Games – Men's team rosters =

This article shows the rosters of all participating teams at the men's basketball tournament at the 2023 Pan American Games in Santiago.

== Argentina ==
Argentina men's basketball team roster
Players
Coaches

| Pos. | No. | Name | Age – Date of birth | Height | Club | Ctr. |
|---|---|---|---|---|---|---|
| SG | | Franco Baralle | 24 – 25 March 1999 | 1.85 m (6 ft 1 in) | Minas | (Brazil) |
| | | Pedro Barral | – | | Obras Sanitarias | (Argentina) |
| | | Juan Bocca | – | | Obradoiro CAB | (Spain) |
| | | Martín Cuello | – | | Flamengo | (Brazil) |
| | | Lucas Giovannetti | – | | Movistar Estudiantes | (Spain) |
| | | Tayavek Gallizzi | 30 – 8 February 1993 | 2.06 m (6 ft 9 in) | Quimsa | (Argentina) |
| | | Bautista Lugarini | – | | Instituto | (Argentina) |
| | | Agustín Pérez | – | | San Martin de Corrientes | (Argentina) |
| | | Fabián Ramirez Barrios | – | | Quimsa | (Argentina) |
| | | Javier Saiz | 29 – 26 February 1994 | 2.06 m (6 ft 9 in) | Instituto | (Argentina) |
| PG | | Santiago Scala | 32 – 6 February 1991 | 1.87 m (6 ft 2 in) | SESI Franca | (Brazil) |
| | | Kevin Hernandez | – | | San Lorenzo | (Argentina) |

Head coach

- (Argentina) Leandro Ramella

Assistant coach(es)

Legend

- (C) Team captain
- Club – describes current club
- Age – describes age
  on 31 July 2023

== Brazil ==
Brazil men's basketball team roster
Players
Coaches

| Pos. | No. | Name | Age – Date of birth | Height | Club | Ctr. |
|---|---|---|---|---|---|---|
| | | Elio Corazza Neto | – | | Corinthians | (Brazil) |
| | | Scott Machado | – | | Flamengo | (Brazil) |
| | | Reynan dos Santos | – | | Cold Hearts | (United States) |
| | | Didi Louzada | – | | Flamengo | (Brazil) |
| | | Gui Deodato | – | | Flamengo | (Brazil) |
| | | Danilo Fuzaro | – | | Minas | (Brazil) |
| | | Lucas Dias | – | | SESI Franca | (Brazil) |
| | | Gabriel Jaú | – | | Flamengo | (Brazil) |
| | | Wesley Castro | – | | SESI Franca | (Brazil) |
| | | Márcio Henrique | – | | SESI Franca | (Brazil) |
| | | Maique Oliveira | – | | Flamengo | (Brazil) |

Head coach

- (Brazil) Gustavo de Conti

Assistant coach(es)

- (Brazil) Helinho

Legend

- (C) Team captain
- Club – describes current club
- Age – describes age
  on 31 July 2023

== Chile ==
Chile men's basketball team roster
Players
Coaches

| Pos. | No. | Name | Age – Date of birth | Height | Club | Ctr. |
|---|---|---|---|---|---|---|
| | | Nicolás Aguirre | – | | Universidad de Concepción | (Chile) |
| | | Ignacio Ansaldo | – | | Municipal Puente Alto | (Chile) |
| | | Sebastián Carrasco | – | | Universidad de Concepción | (Chile) |
| | | Ignacio Carrión | – | | Colegio Los Leones | (Chile) |
| | | Nicolás Carvacho | – | | MKS Dąbrowa Górnicza | (Poland) |
| | | Gerardo Isla | – | | CD Valdivia | (Chile) |
| | | Darrol Jones | – | | Colegio Los Leones | (Chile) |
| | | Franco Morales | – | | ABA Ancud | (Chile) |
| | | Marcelo Pérez | – | | Zárate Basket | (Argentina) |
| | | Lino Saéz | – | | Universidad de Concepción | (Chile) |
| | | Diego Sailva | – | | Universidad de Concepción | (Chile) |
| | | Nicolás Aguirre | – | | Las Ánimas | (Chile) |

Head coach

- (Chile) Juan Manuel Córdoba

Assistant coach(es)

Legend

- (C) Team captain
- Club – describes current club
- Age – describes age
  on 31 July 2023

== Dominican Republic ==
Dominican Republic men's basketball team roster
Players
Coaches

| Pos. | No. | Name | Age – Date of birth | Height | Club | Ctr. |
|---|---|---|---|---|---|---|
| | | Miguel Simon | – | | El Millon Yireh | (Dominican Republic) |
| | | Miguel Dicent | – | | Club Bameso | (Dominican Republic) |
| | | Sadiel Rojas | – | | Club Bameso | (Dominican Republic) |
| | | Jean Montero | – | | BC Andorra | (Spain) |
| | | Juan Miguel Suero | – | | Mauricio Baéz | (Dominican Republic) |
| | | Brandone Francis | – | | Prawira Bandung | (Indonesia) |
| | | Eddy Polanco | – | | El Millon Yireh | (Dominican Republic) |
| | | Juan Adolfo | – | | San Carlos | (Dominican Republic) |
| | | Richard Bautista | – | | Mauricio Baéz | (Dominican Republic) |
| | | Jhonatan Araujo | – | | San Carlos | (Dominican Republic) |
| | | Jassel Pérez | – | | Titanes del Licey | (Dominican Republic) |
| | | Victor Liz | – | | Caribbean Storm Islands | (Colombia) |

Head coach

- (Argentina) Néstor García

Assistant coach(es)

Legend

- (C) Team captain
- Club – describes current club
- Age – describes age
  on 31 July 2023

== Mexico ==
Mexico men's basketball team roster
Players
Coaches

| Pos. | No. | Name | Age – Date of birth | Height | Club | Ctr. |
|---|---|---|---|---|---|---|
| | | Moisés Andriassi | – | | Astros de Jalisco | (Mexico) |
| | | Iván Montano | – | | Plateros de Fresnillo | (Mexico) |
| | | Fabián Jaimes | – | | Atenas | (Argentina) |
| | | Jorge Camacho | – | | Dorados de Chihuahua | (Mexico) |
| | | Israel Gutiérrez | – | | Dorados de Chihuahua | (Mexico) |
| | | Víctor Álvarez | – | | Soles de Mexicali | (Mexico) |
| | | Kohl Meyer | – | | Soles de Mexicali | (Mexico) |
| | | Omar De Haro | – | | Santos de San Luis | (Mexico) |
| | | Eddie Girón | – | | Correcaminos UAT | (Mexico) |
| | | Jonatan Machado | – | | Astros de Jalisco | (Mexico) |
| | | Irwin Ávalos | – | | Libertadores de Querétaro | (Mexico) |
| | | Victor Valdés | – | | Troy University | (United States) |

Head coach

- (Mexico) Gustavo Quintero

Assistant coach(es)

- (Spain) Xavi Monferrer

Legend

- (C) Team captain
- Club – describes current club
- Age – describes age
  on 31 July 2023

== Panama ==
Panama men's basketball team roster
Players
Coaches

| Pos. | No. | Name | Age – Date of birth | Height | Club | Ctr. |
|---|---|---|---|---|---|---|
| | | Aaron Gedeon | – | | Águilas de Rio Abajo | (Panama) |
| | | Ezequiel Bell | – | | Correcaminos de Colón | (Panama) |
| | | Eric Romero | – | | Libertadores de Querétaro | (Mexico) |
| | | Edward Lopez | – | | Spartans | (Panama) |
| | | Isaac Machore | – | | Toros de Chiriquí | (Panama) |
| | | Amílcar Sanchez | – | | Independiente de Oliva | (Argentina) |
| | | Gil Atencio Yearwood | – | | Caballos de Coclé | (Panama) |
| | | Guillermo Navarro | – | | Spartans | (Panama) |
| | | José Montenegro | – | | Dragones de Don Bosco | (Panama) |
| | | Roberto Armstrong | – | | Correcaminos de Colón | (Panama) |
| | | Justin Quintero | – | | Toros de Chiriquí | (Panama) |
| | | Pablo Rivas | – | | Motillones del Norte | (Colombia) |

Head coach

- (Panama) José Gomez

Assistant coach(es)

- (Panama) Jamaal Levy

Legend

- (C) Team captain
- Club – describes current club
- Age – describes age
  on 31 July 2023

== Puerto Rico ==
Puerto Rico men's basketball team roster
Players
Coaches

| Pos. | No. | Name | Age – Date of birth | Height | Club | Ctr. |
|---|---|---|---|---|---|---|
| | | Tjader Fernandez | – | | Santos de San Luis | (Mexico) |
| | | Luis Hernandez | – | | Atléticos de San Germán | (Puerto Rico) |
| | | Josue Erazo | – | | Santos de San Luis | (Mexico) |
| | | Ismael Cruz | – | | Correcaminos UAT | (Mexico) |
| | | Isaiah Brown | – | | Orlando Christian Prep | (United States) |
| | | Brandon Boyd | – | | Cimarrones del Chocó | (Colombia) |
| | | Jordan Cintrón | – | | Santos de San Luis | (Mexico) |
| | | Alexander Kappos | – | | Abejas de León | (Mexico) |
| | | Wilfredo Rodriguez | – | | Corsarios | (Colombia) |
| | | Alejandro Aviles | – | | Dream City Christian | (United States) |
| | | Alexander Morales Jr. | – | | Osceola Magic | (United States) |
| | | Christian Negron | – | | Panteras de Aguascalientes | (Mexico) |

Head coach

Assistant coach(es)

Legend

- (C) Team captain
- Club – describes current club
- Age – describes age
  on 31 July 2023

== Venezuela ==
Venezuela men's basketball team roster
Players
Coaches

| Pos. | No. | Name | Age – Date of birth | Height | Club | Ctr. |
|---|---|---|---|---|---|---|
| | | Edwin Mijares | – | | Cocodrilos de Caracas | (Venezuela) |
| | | Miguel Ruiz | – | | Guaros de Lara | (Venezuela) |
| | | Windi Graterol | – | | Cimarrones del Chocó | (Colombia) |
| | | Garly Sojo | – | | Broncos de Caracas | (Venezuela) |
| | | Edgar Martinez | – | | Trotamundos | (Venezuela) |
| | | Yeferson Guerra | – | | Panteras de Miranda | (Venezuela) |
| | | Elian Centeno | – | | Diablos de Miranda | (Venezuela) |
| | | Yohanner Sifontes | – | | Leones de Potosí | (Bolivia) |
| | | Nestor Colmenares | – | | Halcones Rojos Veracruz | (Mexico) |
| | | Enrique Medina | – | | Regatas Corrientes | (Argentina) |
| | | José Ascanio | – | | Diablos de Miranda | (Venezuela) |
| | | Franger Pirela | – | | Melilla | (Spain) |

Head coach

- (Venezuela) Daniel Seoane

Assistant coach(es)

- (Venezuela) Yonaiker Ecker

Legend

- (C) Team captain
- Club – describes current club
- Age – describes age
  on 31 July 2023
