= 2024 Liga Sudamericana de Básquetbol =

27th season of the Liga Sudamericana de Básquetbol

2024 Liga Sudamericana de Baloncesto
- League: Liga Sudamericana de Baloncesto
- Season: 2024
- Duration: 15–27 October 2024 (group phase); 30 November – 1 December 2024 (Final Four)
- Teams: 10 (from 6 countries)

Finals
- Champions: (Uruguay) Nacional (1st title)
- Runners-up: (Argentina) San Lorenzo
- Third place: (Argentina) Olímpico
- Fourth place: (Uruguay) Defensor Sporting

Awards
- Season MVP: (Chile) Manny Suárez (Nacional)

Statistical leaders
- Points: (Brazil) João Vitor França (20.8)
- Rebounds: (United States) Derrick Woods (10.8)
- Assists: (Argentina) Lucas Pérez (8.8)
- Index Rating: (United States) Derrick Woods (23.3)

The 2024 Liga Sudamericana de Básquetbol, or 2024 FIBA South American Basketball League, was the 27th season of the Liga Sudamericana de Básquetbol (LSB), the second tier of basketball in South America organised by FIBA Americas. The season began on 15 October and ended on 1 December 2024.

Instituto were the defending champions, but they did not participate in the tournament.

Nacional won their first title after a 77–76 overtime win against San Lorenzo in the final.

== Team allocation ==
The list of teams was confirmed on 25 September 2024 by FIBA. The number of teams was decreased from 12 to 10.

- 1st, 2nd, etc.: Position in national league
- WC: Wild card
Location of teams of the 2024 Liga Sudamericana de Baloncesto group stage.
Red: Group A; Green: Group B.

Teams in the 2024 Liga Sudamericana de Básquetbol
(Argentina) San Lorenzo (3rd)	(Chile) Español de Osorno (2nd)	(Paraguay) San José (1st)
(Argentina) Obras (4th)	(Chile) ABA Ancud (3rd)	(Uruguay) Nacional (3rd)
(Argentina) Olímpico (5th)	(Ecuador) Santa María (1st)	(Uruguay) Defensor Sporting (4th)
(Bolivia) Nacional Potosí (1st)		

== Format ==
The format for this LSB season was altered, as in the group phase there will be two groups of five teams. All team will play each other once, for a total of four games per team. The top two ranked teams will advance to the Final Four, where the first ranked team from Group A will meet the second ranked team from Group B, and so forth, in single-elimination games.

== Group stage ==
Ten teams participate in the group phase, in which each team faced the other teams in the group once. Each group tournament are held at the arena of a host team. The two highest-placed teams advance to the semifinal phase. Games are played from 15 to 27 October 2024.

=== Group A ===
The games of Group A were played from 15 to 20 October 2024 in Osorno, Chile.

Pos	Team	Pld	W	L	PF	PA	PD	Pts	Qualification
1	(Uruguay) Nacional	4	4	0	340	263	+77	8	Advance to Final Four
2	(Argentina) San Lorenzo	4	3	1	330	292	+38	7	Advance to Final Four
3	(Chile) ABA Ancud	4	2	2	297	320	−23	6	
4	(Chile) Coolbet Español de Osorno (H)	4	1	3	291	314	−23	5	
5	(Ecuador) Santa María	4	0	4	294	363	−69	4	

Source: FIBA
(H) Hosts

15 October 2024	Nacional (Uruguay)	90–73	(Chile) ABA Ancud	Osorno
18:10 UTC−3	Scoring by quarter: 26–25, 27–15, 24–21, 13–12
	Pts: Suárez 24; Rebs: Ottonello 6 Asts: Feldeine 6	Boxscore	Pts: Woods 27; Rebs: Peña 10; Asts: Morales 6	Arena: Monumental María Gallardo; Referees: Johnny Batista (PUR), Alan Dos Santos (BRA), Julirys Guzmán (PUR)

15 October 2024	Español de Osorno (Chile)	98–73	(Ecuador) Santa María	Osorno
20:40 UTC−3	Scoring by quarter: 24–13, 23–14, 28–21, 23–25
	Pts: Spencer 24; Rebs: Cardenas 10; Asts: Amor 7	Boxscore	Pts: Hinds 24; Rebs: Quiñones 7 Asts: Martínez 4	Arena: Monumental María Gallardo; Referees: Leonardo Zalazar (ARG), Alexis Mercado (PUR), Larissa Sales (BRA)

16 October 2024	San Lorenzo (Argentina)	73–87	(Uruguay) Nacional	Osorno
18:10 UTC−3	Scoring by quarter: 15–19, 28–26, 16–26, 14–16
	Pts: Córdoba 24; Rebs: Three players 7 Asts: Pérez 8	Boxscore	Pts: Feldeine 25; Rebs: Colmenares 7 Asts: Sarni 5	Arena: Monumental María Gallardo; Referees: Alexis Mercado (PUR), Alan Dos Santos (BRA), Julirys Guzmán (PUR)

16 October 2024	Español de Osorno (Chile)	72–85	(Chile) ABA Ancud	Osorno
20:40 UTC−3	Scoring by quarter: 19–24, 17–22, 12–20, 24–19
	Pts: Suárez 16; Rebs: Cardenas 8 Asts: Four players 2	Boxscore	Pts: Morales 25; Rebs: Peña 10; Asts: Morales, Vergara 4	Arena: Monumental María Gallardo; Referees: Johnny Batista (PUR), Nicolás Flores (PAR), Orlando Varela (HON)

18 October 2024	Santa María (Ecuador)	75–84	(Chile) ABA Ancud	Osorno
18:10 UTC−3	Scoring by quarter: 25–23, 18–19, 16–25, 16–17
	Pts: Hooks 24; Rebs: Guerra 8 Asts: Martínez 4	Boxscore	Pts: Woods 23; Rebs: Woods 10; Asts: Morales 12	Arena: Monumental María Gallardo; Referees: Alexis Mercado (PUR), Alan Dos Santos (BRA), Larissa Sales (BRA)

18 October 2024	Español de Osorno (Chile)	62–77	(Argentina) San Lorenzo	Osorno
20:40 UTC−3	Scoring by quarter: 25–25, 9–20, 8–19, 20–13
	Pts: Rasas 23; Rebs: Rasas 9 Asts: Amor 4	Boxscore	Pts: Lugo 25; Rebs: Córdoba 10; Asts: Pérez 7	Arena: Monumental María Gallardo; Referees: Johnny Batista (PUR), Orlando Varela (HON), Julirys Guzmán (PUR)

19 October 2024	Santa María (Ecuador)	58–84	(Uruguay) Nacional	Osorno
18:10 UTC−3	Scoring by quarter: 16–21, 10–17, 7–23, 25–23
	Pts: Hinds 18; Rebs: Guerra 10; Asts: Arcila 4	Boxscore	Pts: Feldeine 19; Rebs: Colmenares, Watson 10; Asts: Ottonello 4	Arena: Monumental María Gallardo; Referees: Leonardo Zalazar (ARG), Orlando Varela (HON), Julirys Guzmán (PUR)

19 October 2024	ABA Ancud (Chile)	55–83	(Argentina) San Lorenzo	Osorno
20:40 UTC−3	Scoring by quarter: 12–25, 21–19, 14–23, 8–16
	Pts: Rasas 23; Rebs: Rasas 9 Asts: Amor 4	Boxscore	Pts: Lugo 25; Rebs: Córdoba 10; Asts: Pérez 7	Arena: Monumental María Gallardo; Referees: Johnny Batista (PUR), Alan Dos Santos (BRA), Nicolás Flores (PAR)

20 October 2024	San Lorenzo (Argentina)	97–88	(Ecuador) Santa María	Osorno
18:10 UTC−3	Scoring by quarter: 30–19, 21–23, 27–21, 19–25
	Pts: Lugo 21; Rebs: Basualdo 9 Asts: Pérez 7	Boxscore	Pts: Hinds 19; Rebs: Hinds 10; Asts: Guerra 8	Arena: Monumental María Gallardo; Referees: Alan Dos Santos (BRA), Orlando Varela (HON), Julirys Guzmán (PUR)

20 October 2024	Español de Osorno (Chile)	59–79	(Uruguay) Nacional	Osorno
20:40 UTC−3	Scoring by quarter: 22–21, 4–22, 17–20, 16–16
	Pts: Fofana 24; Rebs: Rasas 11; Asts: Amor 5	Boxscore	Pts: Watson 16; Rebs: Colmenares 9 Asts: Semiglia 4	Arena: Monumental María Gallardo; Referees: Leonardo Zalazar (ARG), Alexis Mercado (PUR), Larissa Sales (BRA)

=== Group B ===
The games of Group B are played from 22 to 27 October 2024 in La Banda, Argentina.

Pos	Team	Pld	W	L	PF	PA	PD	Pts	Qualification
1	(Argentina) Olímpico (H)	4	4	0	397	359	+38	8	Advance to Final Four
2	(Uruguay) Defensor Sporting	4	3	1	327	295	+32	7	Advance to Final Four
3	(Argentina) Obras	4	2	2	384	335	+49	6	
4	(Paraguay) San José	4	1	3	319	357	−38	5	
5	(Bolivia) Nacional Potosí	4	0	4	287	368	−81	4	

Source: FIBA
(H) Hosts

22 October 2024	Defensor Sporting (Uruguay)	83–77	(Argentina) Obras	La Banda
18:40 UTC−3	Scoring by quarter: 17–18, 20–14, 20–25, 26–20
	Pts: Curry 21; Rebs: Grystak 7 Asts: Curry 6	Boxscore	Pts: Mata 19; Rebs: Clarke, Mata 8 Asts: Barral 7	Arena: Estadio Vicente Rosales; Attendance: 100; Referees: Roberto Vázquez (PUR), Fernando Leite (BRA), Daniel García (VEN)

22 October 2024	Olímpico (Argentina)	92–85	(Bolivia) Nacional Potosí	La Banda
21:10 UTC−3	Scoring by quarter: 25–25, 19–19, 22–15, 26–24
	Pts: Walton, Shriver 16; Rebs: Walton, Morales 6 Asts: Facello 7	Boxscore	Pts: Raines 24; Rebs: Raines 10; Asts: Paletta 8	Arena: Estadio Vicente Rosales; Attendance: 250; Referees: Andrés Bartel (URU), Carmelo de la Rosa (PUR), Nicolas Zivieri (BRA)

23 October 2024	San José (Paraguay)	69–73	(Uruguay) Defensor Sporting	La Banda
18:40 UTC−3	Scoring by quarter: 16–22, 18–14, 21–18, 14–19
	Pts: Belardo 20; Rebs: Michaell Jackson 8 Asts: Dose, Belardo 4	Boxscore	Pts: Montgomery 21; Rebs: Soto 11; Asts: Galletto 5	Arena: Estadio Vicente Rosales; Attendance: 100; Referees: Roberto Vázquez (PUR), Carmelo de la Rosa (PUR), Ramiro Marques (BRA)

23 October 2024	Olímpico (Argentina)	107–106(OT)	(Argentina) Obras	La Banda
21:10 UTC−3	Scoring by quarter: 23–30, 22–21, 23–28, 28–17, Overtime: 11–10
	Pts: Morales, França 18; Rebs: Walton, Morales 6 Asts: França 11	Boxscore	Pts: Clarke 27; Rebs: Clarke 8 Asts: Barral, Clarke 6	Arena: Estadio Vicente Rosales; Attendance: 250; Referees: Andrés Bartel (URU), Daniel García (VEN), Claudio Osorio (CHI)

25 October 2024	Nacional Potosí (Bolivia)	68–100	(Argentina) Obras	La Banda
18:40 UTC−3	Scoring by quarter: 17–26, 15–21, 21–30, 15–23
	Pts: Cheeseman 20; Rebs: Cheeseman 11; Asts: Paletta 6	Boxscore	Pts: Inyaco 23; Rebs: Schattmann 7 Asts: Venegas 11	Arena: Estadio Vicente Rosales; Attendance: 150; Referees: Daniel García (VEN), Fernando Leite (BRA), Carmelo de la Rosa (PUR)

25 October 2024	Olímpico (Argentina)	109–83	(Paraguay) San José	La Banda
21:10 UTC−3	Scoring by quarter: 25–25, 28–19, 31–21, 25–18
	Pts: França 27; Rebs: França 9 Asts: Morales 8	Boxscore	Pts: Michaell Jackson 20; Rebs: Michaell Jackson 9 Asts: Belardo 5	Arena: Estadio Vicente Rosales; Referees: Roberto Vázquez (PUR), Andrés Bartel (URU), Nicolas Zivieri (BRA)

26 October 2024	Nacional Potosí (Bolivia)	60–86	(Uruguay) Defensor Sporting	La Banda
18:40 UTC−3	Scoring by quarter: 13–17, 17–16, 18–33, 12–20
	Pts: Paletta 12; Rebs: Cheeseman 11; Asts: Paletta 7	Boxscore	Pts: Metzger 17; Rebs: Soto, Bianchi 8 Asts: Galletto, Zubiaurre 5	Arena: Estadio Vicente Rosales; Attendance: 100; Referees: Carmelo de la Rosa (PUR), Fernando Leite (BRA), Nicolas Zivieri (BRA)

26 October 2024	Obras (Argentina)	101–77	(Paraguay) San José	La Banda
21:10 UTC−3	Scoring by quarter: 26–13, 22–20, 27–24, 26–20
	Pts: Smaniotti 19; Rebs: Chapero 7 Asts: Inyaco 4	Boxscore	Pts: Sánchez 31; Rebs: Granberry 9 Asts: Riveros 6	Arena: Estadio Vicente Rosales; Attendance: 100; Referees: Daniel García (VEN), Andrés Bartel (URU), Ramiro Marques (BRA)

27 October 2024	San José (Paraguay)	90–74	(Bolivia) Nacional Potosí	La Banda
18:40 UTC−3	Scoring by quarter: 30–21, 32–19, 18–13, 10–21
	Pts: Dose 19; Rebs: Four players 6 Asts: Peralta 6	Boxscore	Pts: Cheeseman 24; Rebs: Ortiz 6 Asts: González, Paletta 3	Arena: Estadio Vicente Rosales; Attendance: 50; Referees: Carmelo de la Rosa (PUR), Fernando Leite (BRA), Andrés Bartel (URU)

27 October 2024	Olímpico (Argentina)	89–85	(Uruguay) Defensor Sporting	La Banda
21:10 UTC−3	Scoring by quarter: 27–17, 21–27, 19–21, 22–20
	Pts: França 30; Rebs: Shriver 7 Asts: Facello, Pérez 6	Boxscore	Pts: Curry 22; Rebs: Soto 6 Asts: Curry 8	Arena: Estadio Vicente Rosales; Attendance: 260; Referees: Roberto Vázquez (PUR), Nicolas Zivieri (BRA), Claudio Osorio (CHI)

== Final Four ==
The Final Four was held on 30 November and 1 December 2024, at the Estadio 8 de Junio in Paysandú, Uruguay.

=== Bracket ===
Semifinals
30 November
(Uruguay) Nacional	76
(Uruguay) Defensor Sporting	58
30 November
(Argentina) Olímpico	65
(Argentina) San Lorenzo	78

Final
1 December
(Uruguay) Nacional (OT)	77
(Argentina) San Lorenzo	76
Third place game
1 December
(Uruguay) Defensor Sporting	68
(Argentina) Olímpico	73

=== Semifinals ===
30 November 2024	Olímpico (Argentina)	65–78	(Argentina) San Lorenzo	Paysandú
19:10	Scoring by quarter: 19–17, 21–26, 12–11, 13–24
	Pts: França 16; Rebs: França 12; Asts: Defelippo 6	Boxscore	Pts: Lugo 33; Rebs: Basualdo 10; Asts: Pérez 9	Arena: Estadio 8 de Junio; Referees: Julio Anaya (PAN), Daniel García (VEN), Julirys Guzmán (PUR)

30 November 2024	Nacional (Uruguay)	76–58	(Uruguay) Defensor Sporting	Paysandú
21:40	Scoring by quarter: 25–11, 21–19, 15–19, 15–9
	Pts: Feldeine 17; Rebs: Colmenares 11; Asts: Sarni 6	Boxscore	Pts: Fernández, Terra 11; Rebs: Montgomery 10; Asts: Curry 4	Arena: Estadio 8 de Junio; Referees: Omar Bermúdez (MEX), Johnny Batista (PUR), Nicolas Zivieri (BRA)

=== Third place game ===
1 December 2024	Defensor Sporting (Uruguay)	68–73	(Argentina) Olímpico	Paysandú
18:10	Scoring by quarter: 20–11, 12–17, 17–24, 19–21
	Pts: Terra 31; Rebs: Montgomery 12; Asts: Curry 4	Boxscore	Pts: França 15; Rebs: three players 6 Asts: Defelippo 6	Arena: Estadio 8 de Junio; Referees: Johnny Batista (PUR), Daniel García (VEN), Carlos Vélez (COL)

=== Final ===
1 December 2024	Nacional (Uruguay)	77–76(OT)	(Argentina) San Lorenzo	Paysandú
20:40	Scoring by quarter: 22–12, 7–23, 20–11, 18–21, Overtime: 10–9
	Pts: Semiglia 16; Rebs: Espíndola 12; Asts: Colmenares, Sarni 4	Boxscore	Pts: Grun 19; Rebs: Grun, Lugo 8 Asts: Pérez 10	Arena: Estadio 8 de Junio; Referees: Julio Anaya (PAN), Omar Bermúdez (MEX), Alan dos Santos (BRA)

=== MVP ===
Player	Team
(Chile) Manny Suárez	(Uruguay) Nacional

=== All-Tournament Team ===
Player	Team
(Argentina) Lucas Pérez	(Argentina) San Lorenzo
(Uruguay) Facundo Terra	(Uruguay) Defensor Sporting
(Uruguay) Gastón Semiglia	(Uruguay) Nacional
(Chile) Manny Suárez	(Uruguay) Nacional
(Brazil) João Vitor França	(Argentina) Olímpico
