= Durrell Summers =

American basketball player (born 1989)

Durrell Summer
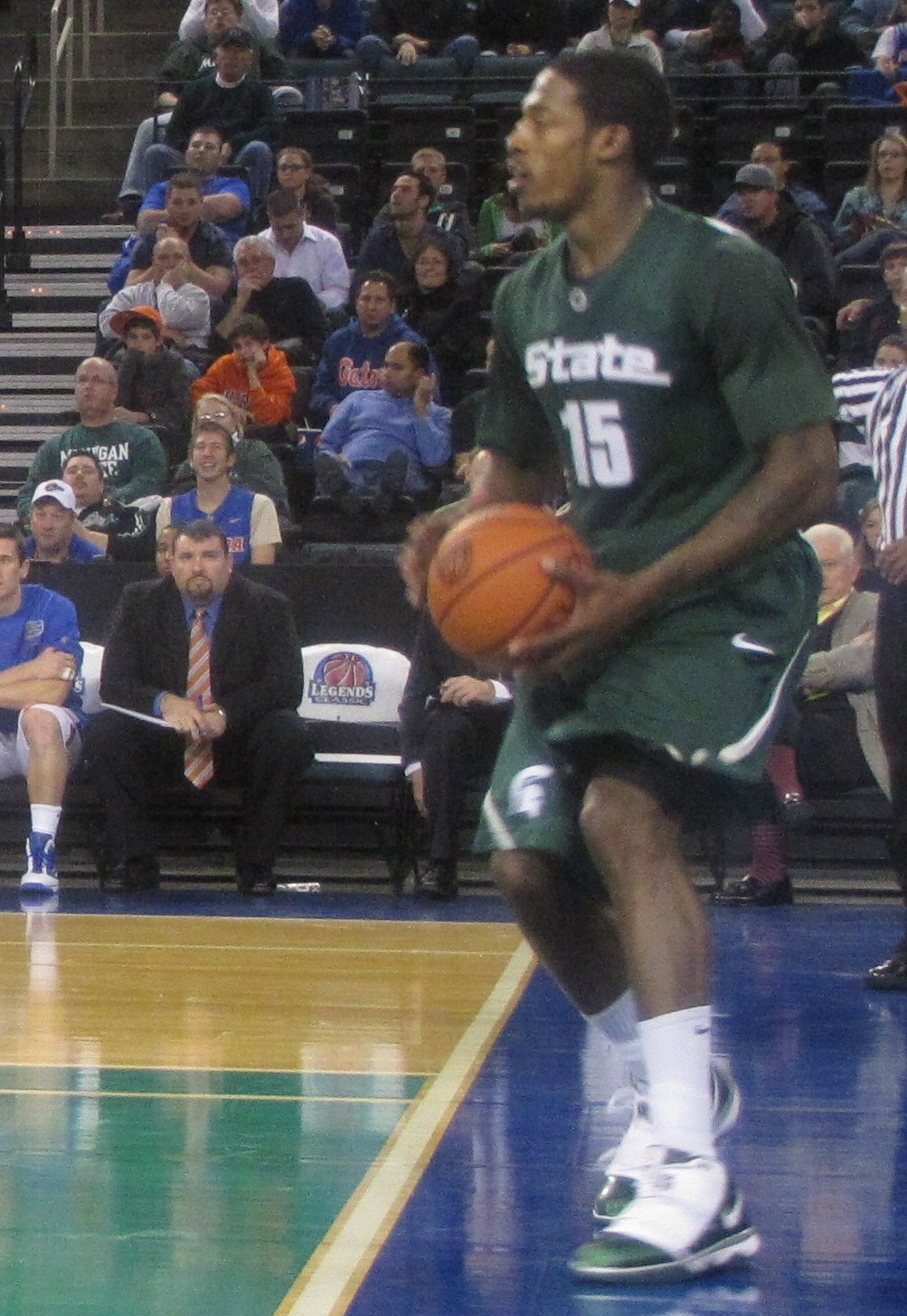

No. 89 – Paisas Basketball
- Position: Shooting guard / small forward
- League: BCL Americas

Personal information
- Born: April 2, 1989 (age 37) Detroit, Michigan, U.S.
- Listed height: 6 ft 5 in (1.96 m)
- Listed weight: 205 lb (93 kg)

Career information
- High school: Redford Covenant Christian (Detroit, Michigan)
- College: Michigan State (2007–2011)
- NBA draft: 2011: undrafted
- Playing career: 2011–present

Career history
- 2011–2012: Maine Red Claws
- 2012: S.O.M. Boulonnais
- 2012–2013: Idaho Stampede
- 2013: Trotamundos de Carabobo
- 2013: Atomerőmű SE
- 2013: BC Körmend
- 2013–2014: Ironi Kiryat Ata
- 2014–2015: Reno Bighorns
- 2015: Westchester Knicks
- 2015: Rayos de Hermosillo
- 2015–2016: Club Deportio Valdivia
- 2016: Frayles de Guasave
- 2016–2017: Club Deportio Valdivia
- 2017: Olimpo
- 2017: Estudiantes de Bahía Blanca
- 2017–2018: Osorno Básquetbol
- 2018: Atlético Echagüe
- 2018: Kauhajoki Karhu Basket
- 2019: Eisbären Bremerhaven
- 2019–2020: CEB Puerto Montt
- 2020: Dorados de Chihuahua
- 2021: Universidad de Concepción
- 2021: Chihuahua Dorados
- 2021: Dorados de Chihuahua
- 2021: Centauros de Portuguesa
- 2022: Hebraica Macabi
- 2022: Mineros de Zacatecas
- 2022–2023: IHC Apes
- 2023: Dorados de Chihuahua
- 2023–2024: Umnugovi Yoluud
- 2024: Indomables de Ciudad Juárez
- 2024: Caballeros de Culiacán
- 2024: Brillantes del Zulia
- 2024: Broncos de Caracas
- 2024: Gladiadores de Anzoátegui
- 2025: Indomables de Ciudad Juárez
- 2025–present: Paisas Basketball

Career highlights
- LNBP All-Star (2022); LNBP East District MVP (2021); Chilean League champion (2016); Fourth-team Parade All-American (2007)

Durrell La Faunce Summers (born April 2, 1989) is an American professional basketball player for Paisas Basketball of the Basketball Champions League Americas. He played college basketball for Michigan State University.

== High school career ==
Summers attended Redford Covenant Christian High School and averaged 34.5 points, 16.5 rebounds and 4.0 steals per game as a senior. He led Redford Covenant to a 20–5 record and a spot in the Class D regional finals where they lost to Jackson Christian High School. In addition, Summers was the 2007 Detroit News All-State Dream Team selection and Associated Press Class D Player of the Year.

== College career ==
Summers played four years with the Michigan State Spartans from 2007 to 2011. As a junior during the 2009–10 season, Summers averaged 11.3 points per game on 45.5% shooting from the field in 26.2 minutes per game. Durrell's college career high of 26 points happened in Columbus, Ohio on January 25, 2009, against the Ohio State Buckeyes. Durrell shot 8/13 from the field, with 4/4 free throws, and was 6/9 from three point range.

Summers postponed entering the NBA draft after his junior year and stayed with the Spartans for a senior year. Tom Izzo's returning class with Summers and Kalin Lucas in addition to the incoming freshman class, had high expectations for the 2010–11 season. The Spartans were ranked #2 in the AP basketball polls. During Summer's senior season, he averaged 11.6 points per game while shooting 38.7% from the field in 29 minutes per game. Summers majored in sociology.

== Professional career ==
In November 2011, Summers was drafted in the second round of the NBA Development League draft by the Maine Red Claws. A month later, he was signed by the Charlotte Bobcats. He recorded two points and one rebound in 10 minutes in two preseason games but was subsequently waived before the start of the 2011–12 season. He then returned to Maine. In January 2012, he left Maine and signed with S.O.M. Boulonnais of France but left in February after three games.

On November 2, 2012, Summers was drafted in the fourth round of the NBA Development League draft by the Santa Cruz Warriors. Three days later, he was traded to the Idaho Stampede.

In May 2013, Summers joined Trotamundos de Carabobo of the Liga Profesional de Baloncesto.

On September 13, 2013, Summers signed with the Wollongong Hawks of the Australian NBL. However, due to personal circumstances, on October 3, he was released by the Hawks. Later that month, he joined Atomerőmű SE of Hungary. After three games, he was released and in November 2013, joined BC Körmend. He was then released by Körmend after just one game. In December 2013, he signed with Ironi Kiryat Ata of Israel where he played six games before being released in February 2014.

On October 24, 2014, Summers' D-League rights were traded by the Idaho Stampede to the Reno Bighorns. He officially joined Reno on November 2, 2014. On February 5, 2015, he was waived by the Bighorns. On February 13, he was acquired by the Westchester Knicks. In April 2015, following the conclusion of the 2014–15 D-League season, he signed with Rayos de Hermosillo of Mexico for the rest of the 2015 CIBACOPA season.

On November 2, 2015, Summers was reacquired by Westchester, only to be waived by the team five days later. On November 14, he signed with Deportivo Valdivia of the Liga Nacional de Básquetbol de Chile. On May 21, 2016, he left Valdivia and signed with Frayles de Guasave of the CIBACOPA. He later re-joined Valdivia for the 2016–17 season. In March 2017, he signed with Club Olimpo of the Torneo Nacional de Ascenso (second division of the Argentine basketball). On December 2, 2017, Summers scored a career-high 56 points to go along with 12 rebounds in a 96–97 loss to the Colegio Los Leones.

For the 2019–20 season, Summers was acquired by the Hornets' NBA G League affiliate, the Greensboro Swarm. However, he never played for the team. Summers spent the 2019–20 season with CEB Puerto Montt of the Liga Nacional de Básquetbol de Chile. He averaged 30.8 points, 5.7 rebounds, 2.9 assists and 1.0 steal per game. On October 2, 2020, Summers signed with Dorados de Chihuahua of the Mexican Liga Nacional de Baloncesto Profesional.

In May 2020, Summers signed with Team Detroit in The Basketball Tournament.
