= 2019 Liga Sudamericana de Básquetbol =

South American basketball league season

Liga Sudamericana de Básquetbol
- Season: 2019
- Dates: 1 October – 13 December 2019
- Games played: 39
- Teams: 16

Regular season
- Season MVP: Cauê Borges

Finals
- Champions: (Brazil) Botafogo (1st title)
- Runners-up: (Brazil) Corinthians

The 2019 Liga Sudamericana de Básquetbol, or 2019 FIBA South American Basketball League, was the 24th edition of the second-tier level continental professional club basketball competition in the Americas, the FIBA Americas League. Sixteen teams from South America competed over three rounds to determine the champion. The defending champions, Franca, did not have the opportunity to defend their title, as they were playing in the first season of Basketball Champions League Americas. Botafogo of Brazil won their first Liga Sudamericana de Básquetbol championship in team history by beating Corinthians of Brazil.

== Team allocation ==
	Teams entering in this round	Teams advancing from previous round
Group phase (16 teams)	16 qualified teams	
Semifinal Phase (8 teams)		4 group winners from the group phase; 3 group runners-up from the group phase; 1 group third placed from the group phase
Finals (2 teams)		2 group winners from the semifinal phase

=== Teams ===
Group phase
(Argentina) Ferro Carril Oeste (3rd)	(Brazil) Botafogo (4th)	(Chile) Las Ánimas de Valdivia (CW)	(Paraguay) San José (1st)
(Argentina) Ciclista Olímpico (5th)	(Brazil) Pinheiros (5th)	(Colombia) Búcaros (2nd)	(Uruguay) Malvín (2nd)
(Argentina) Salta Basket (CW)	(Brazil) Corinthians (6th)	(Colombia) B&B de San Andrés (CW)	(Uruguay) Nacional (3rd)
(Bolivia) Pichincha de Potosí (1st)	(Chile) Leones de Quilpué (2nd)	(Ecuador) Piratas de los Lagos (3rd)	(Uruguay) Defensor Sporting (6th)

The labels in the parentheses show how each team qualified for the place of its starting round:

- 1st, 2nd, etc.: League position after Playoffs
- CW: Cup winner
- WC: Wild card

== Group phase ==
Sixteen teams participated in the group phase, in which each team faced the other teams in the group once. Each group tournament was held at the arena of a host team. The two highest-placed teams in groups B, C, and D, and the highest-placed team in group A advanced to the semifinal phase. Also, the best third-placed team from groups B, C and D advanced to the semifinal phase. Games were played from 1 to 24 October, 2019.

=== Group A ===
The games of Group A were played from 1 to 3 October 2019 in Ibarra, Ecuador.

Pos	Team	Pld	W	L	PF	PA	PD	Pts	Qualification
1	(Ecuador) Piratas de los Lagos (H)	3	2	1	247	236	+11	5 (Note: Head-to-head point difference: Piratas de Los Lagos +8, San José +2, Pichincha de Potosí −10.)	Advance to Semifinal Phase
2	(Paraguay) San José	3	2	1	244	228	+16	5	
3	(Bolivia) Pichincha de Potosí	3	2	1	243	229	+14	5	
4	(Colombia) Búcaros	3	0	3	218	259	−41	3	

Source: FIBA
(H) Hosts

=== Group B ===
The games of Group B were played from 8 to 10 October 2019 in São Paulo, Brazil.

Pos	Team	Pld	W	L	PF	PA	PD	Pts	Qualification
1	(Brazil) Corinthians (H)	3	3	0	241	193	+48	6	Advance to Semifinal Phase
2	(Argentina) Ferro Carril Oeste	3	2	1	213	205	+8	5	Advance to Semifinal Phase
3	(Chile) Las Ánimas de Valdivia	3	1	2	208	240	−32	4	
4	(Uruguay) Defensor Sporting	3	0	3	201	225	−24	3	

Source: FIBA
(H) Hosts

=== Group C ===
The games of Group C were played from 15 to 17 October 2019 in La Banda, Argentina.

Pos	Team	Pld	W	L	PF	PA	PD	Pts	Qualification
1	(Argentina) Ciclista Olímpico (H)	3	3	0	239	215	+24	6	Advance to Semifinal Phase
2	(Brazil) Pinheiros	3	2	1	242	219	+23	5	Advance to Semifinal Phase
3	(Uruguay) Malvín	3	1	2	205	222	−17	4	
4	(Chile) Leones de Quilpué	3	0	3	229	259	−30	3	

Source: FIBA
(H) Hosts

=== Group D ===
The games of Group D were played from 22 to 24 October 2019 in San Andrés, Colombia.

Pos	Team	Pld	W	L	PF	PA	PD	Pts	Qualification
1	(Argentina) Salta Basket	3	3	0	224	183	+41	6	Advance to Semifinal Phase
2	(Brazil) Botafogo	3	2	1	210	201	+9	5	Advance to Semifinal Phase
3	(Uruguay) Nacional	3	1	2	191	200	−9	4	
4	(Colombia) B&B de San Andrés (H)	3	0	3	196	237	−41	3	

Source: FIBA
(H) Hosts

=== Best third-placed team ===
Pos	Grp	Team	Pld	W	L	PF	PA	PD	Pts	Qualification
1	D	(Uruguay) Nacional	3	1	2	191	200	−9	4	Advance to Semifinal Phase
2	C	(Uruguay) Malvín	3	1	2	205	222	−17	4	
3	B	(Chile) Las Ánimas de Valdivia	3	1	2	208	240	−32	4	

Source: FIBA

== Semifinal phase ==
The eight teams which advanced from the group phase played in this stage. The eight teams were split into two groups, in which each team faced the other teams in the group once. Each group tournament was held at the arena of a host team. The highest-placed teams in each group advanced to the Grand Final series. Games were played from 12 to 21 November 2019.

=== Group E ===
The games of Group E were played from 12 to 14 November 2019 in São Paulo, Brazil.

Pos	Team	Pld	W	L	PF	PA	PD	Pts	Qualification
1	(Brazil) Corinthians (H)	3	3	0	265	184	+81	6	Advance to Finals
2	(Argentina) Ferro Carril Oeste	3	2	1	242	193	+49	5	
3	(Brazil) Pinheiros	3	1	2	222	214	+8	4	
4	(Ecuador) Piratas de los Lagos	3	0	3	183	321	−138	3	

Source: FIBA
(H) Hosts

=== Group F ===
The games of Group F were played from 19 to 21 November 2019 in La Banda, Argentina.

Pos	Team	Pld	W	L	PF	PA	PD	Pts	Qualification
1	(Brazil) Botafogo	3	3	0	209	197	+12	6	Advance to Finals
2	(Argentina) Ciclista Olímpico (H)	3	2	1	228	209	+19	5	
3	(Uruguay) Nacional	3	1	2	210	227	−17	4	
4	(Argentina) Salta Basket	3	0	3	201	215	−14	3	

Source: FIBA
(H) Hosts

== Finals ==
The Grand Finals were decided in a best-of-three playoff format. Games were played on 5, 12, and 13 December 2019. The team with the better record in the Semifinal phase played Games 2 and 3 (if necessary) at home.

Team 1	Series	Team 2	Game 1	Game 2	Game 3
Corinthians (Brazil)	1–2	(Brazil) Botafogo	88–74	64–74	70–74
