= Kenny Jones (basketball) =

American basketball player (born 1984)

No. 13 – Club Alianza Viedma
- Position: Power forward
- League: La Liga Argentina de Básquet

Personal information
- Born: July 22, 1984 (age 42) Wyandanch, New York
- Listed height: 6 ft 6 in (1.98 m)
- Listed weight: 215 lb (98 kg)

Career information
- High school: Wyandanch (Wyandanch, New York)
- College: Kentucky State (2004–2008)
- NBA draft: 2008: undrafted
- Playing career: 2008–present

Career history
- 2008–2010: Kentucky Bisons
- 2010–11: Bluegrass Stallions
- 2011–12: Dachau Spurs
- 2012: Tinguiririca San Fernando
- 2013: Saint John Mill Rats
- 2013: Trigueros de Ciudad Obregón
- 2013–2014: Instituto Córdoba
- 2014–2015: Saint John Mill Rats
- 2015: Fuerza Guinda de Nogales
- 2015–2016: Hindú Club de Resistencia Chaco
- 2016: Fuerza Guinda de Nogales
- 2016–2018: Hindú Club de Resistencia Chaco
- 2018–2019: Cape Breton Highlanders
- 2019–present: Club Alianza Viedma

Career highlights
- All- TNA Second Team (2018); All- TNA Import Team (2017); All-TNA First Team (2017); All-CIBACOPA Second Team (2015); All-NBL Canada Second Team (2015); NBL Canada scoring champion (2015); TNA Player of the Year (2014); TNA Import Player of the Year (2014); All-TNA First Team (2014); CIBACOPA Player of the Year (2013); CIBACOPA Import Player of the Year (2013); All-CIBACOPA First Team (2013); All-LNB First Team (2012); LNB Forward of the year (2012); Regionalliga Player of the Year (2012); PBL Newcomer of the Year (2011); All-PBL Second Team (2011); All-ABA Second Team (2010); All-ABA First Team (2009); ABA champion (2009)

Kenneth Terrell Jones (born July 22, 1984) is an American professional basketball player who formerly played for Hindú Club de Resistencia Chaco of the Torneo Nacional de Ascenso (TNA), the second-tier league in Argentina.

== College career ==
Jones originally committed to play college basketball for Saint Paul's in Virginia, but did not like it there and left after two months. He later came into contact with Kentucky State University recruiter Charles Coleman who got him to play for the college in the Southern Intercollegiate Athletic Conference (SIAC) of the NCAA Division II. Staying there from 2004 to 2008, he was selected on the SIAC First Team, named SIAC men's basketball MVP and earned a Division II All-America honourable mention for his senior season.

== Professional career ==
He stayed in Kentucky after graduating, signing with the ABA's Kentucky Bisons. He spent two seasons with the Bisons, winning the ABA in 2009 and earning All-Star honours in 2008–09 and 2009–10. He then spent the 2010–11 with another Kentucky team, the Bluegrass Stallions of the Premier Basketball League.

The American moved to Germany in 2011, playing the 2011–12 1. Regionalliga Südost (third division) season with the Dachau Spurs. His next stop was in the Chilean Dimayor with Tinguiririca San Fernando, playing the 2012 season from September, to November when his team lost in the playoff semifinals.

On 24 January 2013, Jones signed with the Saint John Mill Rats of the National Basketball League of Canada (NBL Canada). He debuted that same day against the Moncton Miracles, scoring 25 points and grabbing 6 rebounds. Averaging 22.7 points and 8.4 rebounds per game in the 17 games he played, he earned Player of the Week honours for the week ending 17 March 2013. He added a selection to the NBL Canada All-Playoff Team at the end of the season, and was also nominated for the All-Star Game in April but he had left the country by that time.

Meanwhile, he had joined Trigueros de Ciudad Obregón in the Mexican regional Circuito de Baloncesto de la Costa del Pacífico (CIBACOPA) for the 2013 season lasting from April to July. He finished as league top scorer with over 25 points per game, also making the league All-Star Game. His next stop was in the Argentine second-tier division TNA, as he signed with Instituto Atlético Central Córdoba in September 2013. At the end of the season in May 2014, he was selected by Latinbasket.com as their choice for the league's best player and import player of the year.

Jones re-signed with Saint John in September 2014. He was named to the All-NBL Canada Team at the end of the 2014–15 season. He helped the Mill Rats reach the playoff semifinals, but was powerless to prevent them from losing the series to the Island Storm, despite scoring 28 points and grabbing a game-high 11 rebounds in the decisive game. The Mill Rats placed Jones on their protected list in late May, meaning no other NBL Canada team can approach him for contract negotiations before the start of training camp for the 2015–16 NBL Canada season.

Having been selected in the second round of the 2015 CIBACOPA draft by Fuerza Guinda de Nogales, Jones joined the team from May to play another season in the Mexican league. He had averages of 20.1 points and 7.4 rebounds for Fuerza Guinda, helping the team reach the championship finals, but they were punished 56–80 by the Tijuana Zonkeys in game 7 on 24 July 2015 to concede the title, with Jones posting a team high 15 points. He finished the season averaging 19.9 points, 7.4 rebounds, 2.4 assists, and 1.2 steals per game.

On 17 October 2015, Jones signed with Hindú Club de Resistencia Chaco, returning to the TNA in Argentina.
