= Manny Suárez =

Chilean-Spanish basketball player (born 1993)

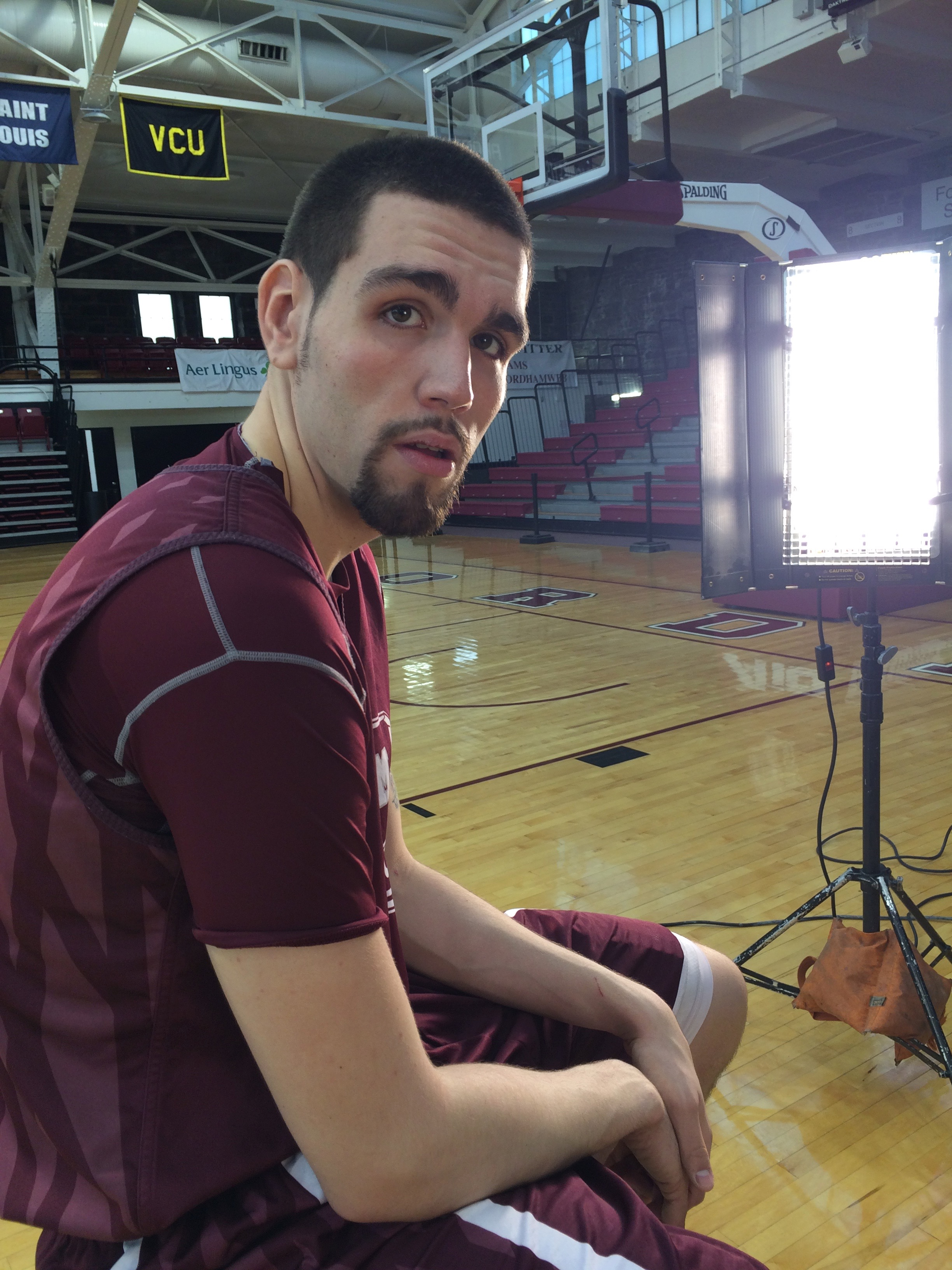
- Suárez with Fordham in 2015

No. 44 – Prawira Harum Bandung
- Position: Forward / center
- League: IBL

Personal information
- Born: 12 November 1993 (age 33) Cliffside Park, New Jersey, U.S.
- Listed height: 6 ft 10 in (2.08 m)
- Listed weight: 224 lb (102 kg)

Career information
- High school: Cliffside (Cliffside Park, New Jersey); Marist (Bayonne, New Jersey)
- College: Fordham (2014–2015); Adelphi (2015–2017); Creighton (2017–2018)
- Playing career: 2018–present

Career history
- 2018-2019: CD Las Ánimas
- 2018-2019: CD Castro
- 2019-2020: CEB Puerto Montt
- 2020–2021: Iraurgi SB
- 2021–2022: Hübner Nyíregyháza BS
- 2022–2023: BC Balkan Botevgrad
- 2023–2024: BC Kalev
- 2024–present: Prawira Bandung

Career highlights
- Estonian League champion (2024); All-KML Team (2024); Estonian Cup winner (2024)

Manuel "Manny" Alejandro Suárez Montero (born November 12, 1993) is a Chilean-Spanish basketball player who currently plays for Prawira Bandung of the Indonesian Basketball League (IBL). Manny also competes internationally for the Chilean national team.

Raised in Cliffside Park, New Jersey, Suárez attended Cliffside Park High School before transferring to Marist High School.

== College career ==
=== Fordham Rams (2014-15) ===
In the 2014-15 season, Suárez played for the Fordham Rams. Averaging 7.5 minutes in 19 games played, Manny averaged 1.8 points and 2.1 rebounds.

The Rams finished the season 10–21, 4–14 in A-10 play to finish in last place. They advanced to the second round of the A-10 tournament, where they lost to the Dayton Flyers, a game in which Manny played 4 minutes and scored 3 points.

=== Adelphi Panthers (2015-2017) ===
In the 2015–16 and 2016-17 seasons, Suárez played for the Adelphi Panthers. In the two seasons combined, Manny averaged 15.1 points, 8.6 rebounds and 2.2 blocks. Adelphi finished the respective seasons 20-8 and 18-12.

In 2015-16, Adelphi reached the quarter finals of the NE-10 championship. In the quarterfinals, Manny had 23 points, 11 rebounds and 4 blocks. Adelphi also reached the quarterfinals in the 2016-17 season, in which game Manny had 21 points,11 rebounds and 2 blocks.

=== Creighton Bluejays (2017-2018) ===
For the 2017-18 season, Manny was recruited to join the Creighton Bluejays by Greg McDermott. About thirty college basketball teams had expressed interest in signing Suárez. Manny averaged 3 points and 2.6 rebounds in 7 minutes per game in 24 games played.

Seeded 8th in the NCAA tournament, Creighton lost in the first round to 9th seed Kansas State, a game in which Manny played 1 minute and had 1 offensive rebound.

Suárez later graduated from Creighton.

== Professional career ==
=== CD Las Ánimas, CD Castro (2018-19) ===
In the 2018-19 season, Suárez played for Chilean club CD Las Ánimas in the Basketball Champions League Americas, the highest tier basketball league in the continent. With Las Animas, Manny averaged 4 points, 2.3 assists and 2 rebounds in 11.6 minutes per game over 3 games played.

Las Animas finished the Champions League with 2 wins and 4 losses, placing 8th.

In the same season, Suárez also played for CD Castro in the LNB Chile, the highest division of basketball in Chile. With CD Castro, Manny averaged 13.2 points, 8.7 rebounds, 2 assists, 1.1 steals and 1.7 blocks in 29.6 minutes per game over 23 games played.

CD Castro finished the season with 14 wins and 15 losses.

=== CEB Puerto Montt (2019-20) ===
In the 2019-20 season, Suárez continued in the LNB Chile, playing for CEB Puerto Montt. With Puerto Montt, Manny averaged 15.8 points, 10.1 rebounds, 2.6 assists, 1.4 steals and 1.9 blocks in 30.1 minutes per game over 17 games played.

Puerto Montt finished the season with 16 wins and 18 losses.

=== Iraurgi SB (2020-21) ===
In the 2020-21 season, Suárez played for Spanish club Iraurgi SB in the LEB Plata, the third highest division of basketball in Spain. With Iraurgi, Manny averaged 12.2 points and 6.7 rebounds in 20.6 minutes per game over 14 games played.

Iraurgi finished first in the league, winning 23 of 28 games and earning a promotion to LEB Oro of the second division.

=== Hübner Nyíregyháza BS (2021-22) ===
In the 2021-22 season, Suárez played for Hungarian club Hübner Nyíregyháza BS in the Nemzeti Bajnokság I/A, the highest division of basketball in Hungary. With Nyíregyháza, Manny averaged 13.5 points and 6.2 rebounds in 26.9 minutes per game in 25 games played.

With a record of 13 wins and 19 losses, Nyíregyháza finished the season in 11th place.

=== BC Balkan Botevgrad (2022-23) ===
In the 2022-23 season, Suárez played for 7-time Bulgarian champions BC Balkan Botevgrad in the Bulgarian NBL, the highest division of basketball in Bulgaria. With Balkan, Manny averaged 16.8 points, 8.7 rebounds, 1.4 assists, 1.4 steals and 1.5 blocks in 25.2 minutes per game over 39 games played. In the FIBA Europe Cup, he averaged 12 points, 7 rebounds, 1 steal and 1 block in 22.7 minutes per game over 6 games played.

Balkan finished the Bulgarian NBL regular season in 2nd place with a record of 23 wins and 7 losses, but were crowned the champions after beating BC Chernomorets in the finals. Manny was crowned the MVP of the finals. In the FIBA Europe Cup, Balkan failed to qualify from Group K in the second round of the tournament.

=== BC Kalev (2023-24) ===
For the 2023-24 season, Suárez has signed with 13-time Estonian champions, 1-time Estonian-Latvian champions and 2022-23 FIBA Europe Cup semi-finalists BC Kalev of the Latvian–Estonian Basketball League (LEBL) the highest division of basketball in both Estonia and Latvia. Kalev will also play in the Korvpalli Meistriliiga, the Estonian domestic basketball league running parallel with the LEBL, the Estonian Cup, and the 2023-24 FIBA Europe Cup.

== National team career ==
Upon graduation from Creighton, Suárez joined the Chilean national team. He later played at the 2023 FIBA Basketball World Cup qualification.

== Player profile ==
He is ambidextrous and can play as small forward, power forward or center.

== Personal ==
He is a Chilean citizen through his mother Mapi who moved to the United States. His father is a Spaniard. Suárez has a sister named María Teresa.

He recalls that playing in the National Basketball Association (NBA) has been his dream since he was eight years old.

== Career statistics ==
Legend
GP	Games played	GS	Games started	MPG	Minutes per game
FG%	Field-goal percentage	3P%	3-point field-goal percentage	FT%	Free-throw percentage
RPG	Rebounds per game	APG	Assists per game	SPG	Steals per game
BPG	Blocks per game	PPG	Points per game	PIR	Performance index rating
**Bold**	Career high

=== College ===
Season	Team	GP	MPG	FG%	3P%	FT%	RPG	APG	SPG	BPG	PPG
2014-15	Fordham	19	7.5	.231	.250	.667	2.1	0.2	0.2	0.9	1.8
2015-16	Adelphi	28	25.8	.467	.335	.746	7.7	0.8	0.8	2.5	13.2
2016-17	Adelphi	30	24.6	.552	.319	.795	9.4	1.2	0.4	1.9	16.9
2017-18	Creighton	24	7.5	.446	.250	.667	2.6	0.4	0.0	0.5	3.0

=== Domestic leagues ===
Season	Team	League	GP	MPG	FG%	3P%	FT%	RPG	APG	SPG	BPG	PPG
2018-19	CD Las Ánimas	BCLA	3	11.6	.455	.250	.000	2.0	2.3	0.7	0.0	4.0
2018-19	CD Castro	LNB	23	29.6	.506	.309	.600	8.7	2.0	1.1	1.7	13.2
2019-20	CEB Puerto Montt	LNB	17	30.1	.500	.377	.681	10.1	2.6	1.4	1.9	15.8
2020-21	Iraurgi SB	LEB Plata	14	20.6	.533	.429	.588	6.7	1.0	0.6	0.3	12.2
2021-22	Nyíregyháza BS	NB I/A	25	26.9	.490	.367	.685	6.2	1.5	0.6	0.8	13.5
2022-23	BC Balkan	BNBL	39	25.2	.686	.455	.785	8.7	1.4	1.4	1.5	16.8
2022-23	BC Balkan	FEC	6	22.7	.609	.111	.714	7	0.8	1	1	12
2023-24	BC Kalev	LEBL	35	18.0	.597	.388	.747	5.5	1	0.8	0.9	11.2
