= 2015 Liga Sudamericana de Básquetbol =

2015 Liga Sudamericana
- League: Liga Sudamericana
- Sport: Basketball
- Duration: September 29, 2015 – December 10, 2015

Liga Sudamericana seasons
- ← 2014 2016 →

The 2015 Liga Sudamericana de Básquetbol (LSB), or 2015 FIBA South American League, was the 20th edition of the Liga Sudamericana de Básquetbol competition, which is the second-tier South American professional basketball competition at the club level. It was organized by ABASU, which operates as a regional sub-zone of FIBA Americas.

== Group stage ==
=== Group A ===
Host city: Mogi das Cruzes, Brazil

Pos	Team	Pld	W	L	PF	PA	PD	Pts	Qualification
1	(Argentina) San Martín de Corrientes	3	3	0	280	239	+41	6	Advance to Second Round
2	(Brazil) Mogi das Cruzes	3	2	1	248	219	+29	5	Advance to Second Round
3	(Uruguay) Trouville	3	1	2	244	231	+13	4	
4	(Chile) Deportes Castro	3	0	3	196	279	−83	3	

Source: fiba.com

29 September 2015
17:45

Summary

San Martín de Corrientes	99–88	Trouville
Scoring by quarter: 22 - 16, 24 - 21, 27 - 24, 26 - 27
Pts: Jeremiah Demetrius Wood 45; Rebs: Jeremiah Demetrius Wood 14; Asts: Diego Andres Ciociari 15		Pts: Joaquin Izuibejeres 32; Rebs: Marcus Ryan Elliott 15; Asts: Santiago Adolfo Vidal Casaretto 11

Ginásio Municipal Hugo Ramos, Mogi das Cruzes

29 September 2015
20:00

Summary

Mogi das Cruzes	98–63	Deportes Castro
Scoring by quarter: 30-17, 26-14, 20-11, 22-21
Pts: Guilherme Filipin 15; Rebs: Lucas Fernandes Mariano 11; Asts: Elio Neto 6		Pts: Juan Fontena 15; Rebs: Eugene Mccrory 10; Asts: Gonzalo Velasquez 3

Ginásio Municipal Hugo Ramos, Mogi das Cruzes

30 September 2015
17:45

Report

Deportes Castro	74–93	San Martín de Corrientes
Scoring by quarter: 11-25, 22-21, 21-20, 20-27
Pts: Gonzalo Velasquez 18; Rebs: Juan Fontena 5 Asts: Jordan Davis 4		Pts: Jeremiah Wood 26; Rebs: Mariano Fierro 7 Asts: Diego Ciorciari 7

Ginásio Municipal Hugo Ramos, Mogi das Cruzes

30 September 2015
20:00

Report

Trouville	68–73	Mogi das Cruzes
Scoring by quarter: 19-18, 7-20, 20-17, 22-18
Pts: Marcus Elliott 14; Rebs: Marcus Elliott 8 Asts: Santiago Vidal 4		Pts: Shamell Stallworth 19; Rebs: Paulo Prestes 8 Asts: Larry Taylor 3

Ginásio Municipal Hugo Ramos, Mogi das Cruzes

1 October 2015
17:45

Report

Deportes Castro	59–88	Trouville
Scoring by quarter: 18-22, 16-23, 11-23, 14-20
Pts: Juan Fontena 12; Rebs: Juan Fontena 6 Asts: Jordan Davis 7		Pts: Nicolas Borsellino 22; Rebs: Nicolas Borsellino 11; Asts: Manuel Romero Schiaffarino 5

Ginásio Municipal Hugo Ramos, Mogi das Cruzes

1 October 2015
20:00

Report

Mogi das Cruzes	77–88	San Martín de Corrientes
Scoring by quarter: 16-24, 17-18, 24-21, 20-25
Pts: Lucas Fernandes Mariano 20; Rebs: Paulo Prestes 6 Asts: Larry Taylor 4		Pts: Mateo Bolivar 19; Rebs: Mariano Fierro 5 Asts: Miguel Gerlero 4

Ginásio Municipal Hugo Ramos, Mogi das Cruzes

=== Group B ===
Host city: Bogotá, Colombia

Pos	Team	Pld	W	L	PF	PA	PD	Pts	Qualification
1	(Uruguay) Club Malvín	3	3	0	234	182	+52	6	Advance to Second Round
2	(Argentina) Obras Sanitarias	3	2	1	258	203	+55	5	Advance to Second Round
3	(Colombia) Piratas de Bogotá	3	1	2	237	266	−29	4	
4	(Bolivia) Vikingos	3	0	3	161	239	−78	3	

Source: fiba.com

6 October 2015
17:45

Report

Obras Sanitarias	64–79	Club Malvín
Scoring by quarter: 26-16, 9-21, 14-24, 15-18
Pts: Selem Safar 14; Rebs: Dennis John Horner 10; Asts: Bruno Fitipaldo 4		Pts: Mathias Calfani 19; Rebs: Mathias Calfani 15; Asts: Federico Bavosi 6

Coliseo El Salitre, Bogotá

6 October 2015
20:00

Report

Piratas de Bogotá	84–72	Vikingos
Scoring by quarter: 20-13, 25-22, 18-16, 21-21
Pts: Brandon Givens 26; Rebs: Jhon Romero 7 Asts: Brandon Givens 5		Pts: Michael Anderson 19; Rebs: Ronald Arze 10; Asts: Ronald Arze 4

Coliseo El Salitre, Bogotá

7 October 2015
17:45

Report

Club Malvín	67–47	Vikingos
Scoring by quarter: 22-9, 7-13, 18-11, 20-14
Pts: Mathias Calfani 12; Rebs: Mathias Calfani 10; Asts: Federico Bavosi 5		Pts: Jason Jones Jr 19; Rebs: John Jones 12; Asts: Michael Anderson 2

Coliseo El Salitre, Bogotá

7 October 2015
20:00

Report

Obras Sanitarias	106–82	Piratas de Bogotá
Scoring by quarter: 25-22, 23-17, 34-16, 24-17
Pts: Juan Pedro Gutiérrez 18; Rebs: Juan Pedro Gutiérrez 7 Asts: Bruno Fitipaldo 10		Pts: Brandon Givens 23; Rebs: Jorge Salazar 8 Asts: Brandon Givens 8

Coliseo El Salitre, Bogotá

8 October 2015
17:45

Report

Vikingos	42–88	Obras Sanitarias
Scoring by quarter: 12-24, 6-21, 12-28, 12-15
Pts: Michael Anderson 20; Rebs: Michael Anderson 8 Asts: Jason Jones Jr 4		Pts: Tomás Zanzottera 19; Rebs: Marcos Delía 7 Asts: Iván Basualdo 6

Coliseo El Salitre, Bogotá

8 October 2015
20:00

Summary

Piratas de Bogotá	71–88	Club Malvín
Scoring by quarter: 28-14, 12-14, 14-30, 17-30
Pts: Jorge Salazar 22; Rebs: Franklin Forbes 6 Asts: Franklin Forbes 6		Pts: Nicolas Mazzarino 16; Rebs: Mathias Calfani 8 Asts: Federico Bavosi 6

Coliseo El Salitre, Bogotá

=== Group C ===
Host city: Santiago, Chile

Pos	Team	Pld	W	L	PF	PA	PD	Pts	Qualification
1	(Brazil) Brasília	1	1	0	93	76	+17	2	Advance to Second Round
2	(Chile) Colo-Colo	1	1	0	92	86	+6	2	Advance to Second Round
3	(Uruguay) Atenas	1	0	1	89	92	−3	1	
4	(Argentina) Quilmes de Mar del Plata	1	0	1	76	93	−17	1	

Source: fiba.com

13 October 2015
18:45

Report

Quilmes de Mar del Plata	76–93	Brasília
Scoring by quarter: 23-29, 16-17, 18-27, 19-20
Pts: Walter Baxley 19; Rebs: Enzo Ruiz 6 Asts: Luis Cequeira 4		Pts: Guilherme Giovannoni 19; Rebs: Guilherme Giovannoni 10; Asts: Guilherme Giovannoni 4

Gimnasio Boston College, Santiago

13 October 2015
21:00

Report

Colo-Colo	92–89	Atenas
Scoring by quarter: 26-25, 23-20, 23-23, 20-21
Pts: John Thomas 26; Rebs: John Thomas 10; Asts: Eduardo Marechal 7		Pts: De Andre Coleman 18; Rebs: De Andre Coleman 10; Asts: Matias De Gouveia 9

Gimnasio Boston College, Santiago

14 October 2015
18:45

Atenas	vs.	Quilmes de Mar del Plata

Gimnasio Boston College, Santiago

14 October 2015
21:00

Brasília	vs.	Colo-Colo

Gimnasio Boston College, Santiago

15 October 2015
18:45

Brasília	vs.	Atenas

Gimnasio Boston College, Santiago

15 October 2015
21:00

Colo-Colo	vs.	Quilmes de Mar del Plata

Gimnasio Boston College, Santiago

=== Group D ===
Host city: Quito, Ecuador

Pos	Team	Pld	W	L	PF	PA	PD	Pts	Qualification
1	(Brazil) Franca Basketball Clube	0	0	0	0	0	0	0	Advance to Second Round
2	(Venezuela) Guaros de Lara	0	0	0	0	0	0	0	Advance to Second Round
3	(Ecuador) U.T.E.	0	0	0	0	0	0	0	
4	(Peru) Regatas Lima	0	0	0	0	0	0	0	

Source: fiba.com

20 October 2015
18:00

Franca Basketball Clube	vs.	Guaros de Lara

Coliseo Julio César Hidalgo, Quito

20 October 2015
20:15

U.T.E.	vs.	Regatas Lima

Coliseo Julio César Hidalgo, Quito

21 October 2015
18:00

Guaros de Lara	vs.	Regatas Lima

Coliseo Julio César Hidalgo, Quito

21 October 2015
20:15

Franca Basketball Clube	vs.	U.T.E.

Coliseo Julio César Hidalgo, Quito

22 October 2015
18:00

Regatas Lima	vs.	Franca Basketball Clube

Coliseo Julio César Hidalgo, Quito

22 October 2015
20:15

U.T.E.	vs.	Guaros de Lara

Coliseo Julio César Hidalgo, Quito
