= Terrance Thomas =

American former professional basketball player (born 1980)

Personal information
- Born: December 29, 1980 (age 45) Waco, Texas
- Listed height: 6 ft 6 in (1.98 m)
- Listed weight: 230 lb (104 kg)

Career information
- High school: A. Maceo Smith (Dallas, Texas)
- College: Lon Morris College (2000–2002); Baylor (2002–2004)
- NBA draft: 2004: undrafted
- Playing career: 2004–2017
- Position: Small forward / power forward

Career history
- 2004–2005: T71 Dudelange
- 2005–2006: BK Ventspils
- 2006–2007: Fort Worth Flyers
- 2007–2008: Artland Dragons
- 2008–2009: Bakersfield Jam
- 2009–2010: Potros ITSON
- 2010: Selçuk University
- 2010–2011: Soles de Mexicali
- 2011: Rayos de Hermosillo
- 2011–2012: Reno Bighorns
- 2012: Canton Charge
- 2013: Fort Wayne Mad Ants
- 2014–2015: Deportes Castro
- 2015–2016: Las Ánimas de Valdivia
- 2016–2017: Deportes Castro

Career highlights
- Baltic Basketball League All-Star (2006); Bundesliga Cup champion (2008)

Terrance Lamar Thomas (born December 29, 1980) is an American retired professional basketball player who last played for Deportes Castro of Chile. He played college basketball at Baylor University.

== Career ==
He played professionally for T71 Dudelange (Luxembourg), BK Ventspils (Latvia), the Fort Worth Flyers (D-League), the Artland Dragons (Germany), the Bakersfield Jam (D-League), and Potros ITSON (Mexico).

In 2006, Thomas represented BK Ventspils in the Baltic Basketball League All-Star Game. In 2008, he won the German Bundesliga Cup with the Artland Dragons.

In March 2010, he signed with Selçuk University of the TBL2.

On February 20, 2012, he was acquired by the Canton Charge.

In March 2013, he was acquired by the Fort Wayne Mad Ants. In November 2013, he was reacquired by the Mad Ants. On December 2, 2013, he was waived by the Mad Ants.
