= Stanley Robinson (basketball) =

American basketball player (1988–2020)

Personal information
- Born: July 14, 1988 Birmingham, Alabama, U.S.
- Died: July 21, 2020 (aged 32) Birmingham, Alabama, U.S.
- Listed height: 6 ft 9 in (2.06 m)
- Listed weight: 220 lb (100 kg)

Career information
- High school: Huffman (Birmingham, Alabama)
- College: UConn (2006–2010)
- NBA draft: 2010: 2nd round, 59th overall pick
- Drafted by: Orlando Magic
- Playing career: 2010–2020
- Position: Forward

Career history
- 2010: Rio Grande Valley Vipers
- 2011–2012: Iowa Energy
- 2013–2015: Moncton Miracles
- 2015–2016: Leones de Quilpué
- 2016: Mauricio Baez
- 2016: Reales de La Vega
- 2016: Deportivo Valdivia
- 2016–2017: Defensor Sporting
- 2017: Keflavík
- 2018: Club Escuela de Basquétbol Puerto Montt
- 2018–2020: Español de Talca

Career highlights
- NBA D-League champion (2011); Second-team Parade All-American (2006); Alabama Mr. Basketball (2006)
- Stats at Basketball Reference
Medals
Men's basketball
Representing United States
FIBA Americas U18 Championship
Gold medal – first place	2006 San Antonio	Team competition

Stanley Earl Robinson (July 14, 1988 – July 21, 2020) was an American professional basketball player. He primarily played the small forward position, but occasionally assumed the role of a power forward as well. Robinson played college basketball for the UConn Huskies. He went on to play most of his professional career in South America.

== Early life ==
Robinson was born in Birmingham, Alabama, on July 14, 1988. He studied at the University of Connecticut, and played college basketball with the UConn Huskies. In the run-up to the NBA draft in June 2010, he was described as a "strong offensive rebounder" and an "explosive finisher". However, his quickness was somewhat cancelled out by mediocre ball-handling, and it was predicted that the absence of major development in his four years of college basketball would lead him to be selected in round two.

== Professional career ==
Robinson was selected in the second round of the 2010 NBA draft by the Orlando Magic with the 59th overall pick. He signed a non-guaranteed, one-year contract with the Magic. However, Robinson was waived following the conclusion of training camp in October 2010.

For the 2011–2012 season, Robinson played with the Iowa Energy of the NBA Development League.

On October 17, 2013, Robinson signed with the Moncton Miracles of the National Basketball League of Canada (NBL). However, on February 5, 2014, he was released due to an injury. Robinson resigned with the Miracles on September 25 of that year.

On September 7, 2015, Robinson signed with Leones de Quilpué, a Chilean club that plays in the Liga Nacional de Básquetbol de Chile (LNB). The following July he moved to the Dominican Republic to play for Reales de La Vega, and in September 2016 he came back to Chile with Deportivo Valdivia, then in November he joined Defensor Sporting in Uruguay.

In November 2017, Robinson signed with Keflavík of the Icelandic Úrvalsdeild karla. Disappointed by his physical shape, Keflavík announced on January 2, 2018, they had released him and signed Dominique Elliott in his place. In five games in the Úrvalsdeild, Robinson averaged 15.6 points and 10.4 rebounds.

In January 2018, Robinson signed with Club Escuela de Básquetbol Puerto Montt. That September, he moved to Español de Talca also in Chile.

== Personal life ==
Robinson was father to three daughters, and had moved back to his hometown of Birmingham.

== Death ==
Robinson was found unresponsive in his Birmingham, Alabama home on July 21, 2020, a week after his 32nd birthday. He died from an accidental opioid overdose, the Jefferson County Coroner reported. The cause of death is officially listed as "fentanyl toxicity".

== See also ==
- 2006 boys high school basketball All-Americans
