= 2016 Liga Sudamericana de Básquetbol =

South American basketball league season

Liga Sudamericana de Básquetbol
- Season: 2016
- Dates: 20 September – 7 December 2016
- Games played: 39
- Teams: 16

Regular season
- Season MVP: Shamell Stallworth

Finals
- Champions: (Brazil) Mogi das Cruzes (1st title)
- Runners-up: (Argentina) Bahía Basket

The 2016 Liga Sudamericana de Básquetbol, or 2016 FIBA South American Basketball League, was the 21st edition of the second-tier level continental professional club basketball competition in the Americas, the FIBA Americas League. Sixteen teams from South America competed over three rounds to determine the champion. The defending champions, Brasília, were eliminated in semifinals. Mogi das Cruzes of Brazil won their first Liga Sudamericana de Básquetbol championship in team history by beating Bahía Basket of Argentina.

== Team allocation ==
	Teams entering in this round	Teams advancing from previous round
Group phase (16 teams)	16 qualified teams	
Semifinal Phase (8 teams)		4 group winners from the group phase; 3 group runners-up from the group phase; 1 group third placed from the group phase
Finals (2 teams)		2 group winners from the semifinal phase

=== Teams ===
Group phase
(Argentina) Ciclista Olímpico (3rd)	(Brazil) Mogi das Cruzes (3rd)	(Chile) Universidad de Concepción (2nd)	(Uruguay) Defensor Sporting (2nd)
(Argentina) Bahía Basket (5th)	(Brazil) Brasília (4th)	(Colombia) Búcaros (1st)	(Uruguay) Trouville (3rd)
(Argentina) Gimnasia y Esgrima (CR) (CW)	(Brazil) Paulistano (5th)	(Peru) Regatas Lima (1st)	(Venezuela) Guaros de Lara (1st)
(Bolivia) Universidad San Simón (1st)	(Chile) Deportivo Valdivia (1st)	(Uruguay) Hebraica Macabi (1st)	(Venezuela) Gigantes de Guayana (WC)

The labels in the parentheses show how each team qualified for the place of its starting round:

- 1st, 2nd, etc.: League position after Playoffs
- CW: Cup winner
- WC: Wild card

== Group phase ==
Sixteen teams participated in the group phase, in which each team faced the other teams in the group once. Each group tournament was held at the arena of a host team. The two highest-placed teams in each group advanced to the semifinal phase. Games were played from 20 September to 13 October 2016.

=== Group A ===
The games of Group A were played from 20 to 22 September 2016 in Comodoro Rivadavia, Argentina.

Pos	Team	Pld	W	L	PF	PA	PD	Pts	Qualification
1	(Brazil) Mogi das Cruzes	3	3	0	269	227	+42	6	Advance to Semifinal Phase
2	(Argentina) Gimnasia y Esgrima (CR) (H)	3	2	1	274	247	+27	5	Advance to Semifinal Phase
3	(Uruguay) Defensor Sporting	3	1	2	256	241	+15	4	
4	(Peru) Regatas Lima	3	0	3	210	294	−84	3	

Source: FIBA
(H) Hosts

=== Group B ===
The games of Group B were played from 27 to 29 September 2016 in Valdivia, Chile.

Pos	Team	Pld	W	L	PF	PA	PD	Pts	Qualification
1	(Argentina) Bahía Basket	3	2	1	245	201	+44	5 (Note: Head-to-head point difference: Bahía Basket +29, Hebraica Macabi +1, Deportivo Valdivia −30.)	Advance to Semifinal Phase
2	(Uruguay) Hebraica Macabi	3	2	1	241	224	+17	5	Advance to Semifinal Phase
3	(Chile) Deportivo Valdivia (H)	3	2	1	221	243	−22	5	
4	(Bolivia) Universidad San Simón	3	0	3	200	239	−39	3	

Source: FIBA
(H) Hosts

=== Group C ===
The games of Group C were played from 4 to 6 October 2016 in Barquisimeto, Venezuela.

Pos	Team	Pld	W	L	PF	PA	PD	Pts	Qualification
1	(Brazil) Paulistano	3	3	0	258	207	+51	6	Advance to Semifinal Phase
2	(Venezuela) Guaros de Lara (H)	3	2	1	232	214	+18	5	Advance to Semifinal Phase
3	(Uruguay) Trouville	3	1	2	226	237	−11	4	
4	(Colombia) Búcaros	3	0	3	181	239	−58	3	

Source: FIBA
(H) Hosts

=== Group D ===
The games of Group D were played from 11 to 13 October 2016 in La Banda, Argentina.

Pos	Team	Pld	W	L	PF	PA	PD	Pts	Qualification
1	(Argentina) Ciclista Olímpico (H)	3	3	0	267	198	+69	6	Advance to Semifinal Phase
2	(Brazil) Brasília	3	2	1	247	219	+28	5	Advance to Semifinal Phase
3	(Venezuela) Gigantes de Guayana	3	1	2	222	250	−28	4	
4	(Chile) Universidad de Concepción	3	0	3	203	272	−69	3	

Source: FIBA
(H) Hosts

== Semifinal phase ==
The eight teams which advanced from the group phase played in this stage. The eight teams were split into two groups, in which each team faced the other teams in the group once. Each group tournament was held at the arena of a host team. The highest-placed teams in each group advanced to the Grand Final series. Games were played from 1 to 9 November 2016.

=== Group E ===
The games of Group E were played from 1 to 3 November 2016 in La Banda, Argentina.

Pos	Team	Pld	W	L	PF	PA	PD	Pts	Qualification
1	(Argentina) Bahía Basket	3	3	0	248	214	+34	6	Advance to Finals
2	(Argentina) Ciclista Olímpico (H)	3	2	1	271	222	+49	5	
3	(Brazil) Brasília	3	1	2	237	245	−8	4	
4	(Venezuela) Guaros de Lara	3	0	3	224	299	−75	3	

Source: FIBA
(H) Hosts

=== Group F ===
The games of Group F were played from 7 to 9 November 2016 in Maldonado, Uruguay.

Pos	Team	Pld	W	L	PF	PA	PD	Pts	Qualification
1	(Brazil) Mogi das Cruzes	3	3	0	248	195	+53	6	Advance to Finals
2	(Uruguay) Hebraica Macabi (H)	3	2	1	237	237	0	5	
3	(Brazil) Paulistano	3	1	2	211	234	−23	4	
4	(Argentina) Gimnasia y Esgrima (CR)	3	0	3	222	252	−30	3	

Source: FIBA
(H) Hosts

== Finals ==
The Grand Finals were decided in a best-of-five playoff format. Games were played on 23, 24, and 30 November 2016. The team with the better record in the Semifinal phase played Games 1, 2 and 5 (if necessary) at home.

Team 1	Series	Team 2	Game 1	Game 2	Game 3
Mogi das Cruzes (Brazil)	3–0	(Argentina) Bahía Basket	77–72	80–77	81–84
