= Terrell Grobes =

American basketball player (born 1993)

No. 3 – Amistad Sucre
- Position: Shooting guard
- League: Libobasquet

Personal information
- Born: Sharon Hill, Pennsylvania
- Listed height: 6 ft 5 in (1.96 m)
- Listed weight: 215 lb (98 kg)

Career information
- NBA draft: 2017: undrafted

Career history
- 2017: [Pioneeros de los Mochis] Pioneros de Los Mochis
- 2018: [La Paz Leyendas]
- 2019: [Deportivo Boston El Alto]
- 2019: [Cusco Bylys]
- 2020: [Libertadores de Queretaro] Libertadores de Querétaro
- 2021: [Amistad de Sucre]

Terrell Grobes (born February 8, 1993) is an American basketball player who plays for Libertadores de Querétaro in the Mexican Liga Nacional de Baloncesto Profesional League. He played college basketball for Wilmington University.

== Early life ==
Grobes was born in Sharon Hill, Pennsylvania.

== Professional career ==
After going undrafted June 22, 2017, in the 2017 NBA draft, Grobes signed with Pioneros de Los Mochis in the Mexican CibaCopa League.

On October 11, 2018, Grobes signed with AND-1 La Paz of Libobasquet Bolivia.

On August 25, 2019, Grobes signed with Cusco Bylys of the LNB Peru league.

On July 20, 2020, Grobes signed with Libertadores de Queretaro of the Liga Nacional de Baloncesto Profesional League.

On July 11, 2021, Grobes signed with Amistad Sucre of the Libobasquet league.
