= 2014 Liga Sudamericana de Básquetbol =

2014 Liga Sudamericana
- League: Liga Sudamericana
- Sport: Basketball
- Duration: September 30, 2014 – November 27, 2014
- Season MVP: (Brazil) Alex Garcia (Bauru)
- Top scorer: (United States) Robert Day (Bauru)
- Finals champions: (Brazil) Bauru
- Runners-up: (Brazil) Mogi das Cruzes

Liga Sudamericana seasons
- ← 2013 2015 →

The 2014 Liga Sudamericana de Básquetbol (LSB), or 2014 FIBA South American League, was the 19th edition of the Liga Sudamericana de Básquetbol competition, which is the second-tier South American professional basketball competition at the club level. It was organized by ABASU, which operates as a regional sub-zone of FIBA Americas.

== Group stage ==
=== Group A ===
Host city: Mogi das Cruzes, Brazil

	Team	W	L	Pts	PF	PA
1	(Uruguay) Club Malvín	3	0	6	238	188
2	(Brazil) Mogi das Cruzes	2	1	5	220	193
3	(Argentina) Libertad Sunchales	1	2	4	210	200
4	(Bolivia) La Salle de Tarija	0	3	3	164	251

==== Games ====
September 30, 2014

Box Score

Libertad Sunchales	66–72	Club Malvín
Pts: Alloatti 18; Rebs: Fierro 10; Asts: Sheard 3		Pts: Mazzarino 19; Rebs: Chaney 8 Asts: Mazzarino, Bavosi and Martinez 3

Ginásio Municipal Hugo Ramos, Mogi das Cruzes

September 30, 2014

Box Score

Mogi das Cruzes	84–50	La Salle de Tarija
Pts: Gérson 14; Rebs: Gérson 10; Asts: Gustavinho 6		Pts: Young 14; Rebs: Kante 13; Asts: Byro 6

Ginásio Municipal Hugo Ramos, Mogi das Cruzes

October 1, 2014

Box Score

La Salle de Tarija	60–86	Libertad Sunchales
Pts: Young 22; Rebs: Young 9 Asts: Fernandez 3		Pts: Barovero 25; Rebs: Alloatti 9 Asts: Sheard 5

Ginásio Municipal Hugo Ramos, Mogi das Cruzes

October 1, 2014

Box Score

Mogi das Cruzes	68–85	Club Malvín
Pts: Stallworth 17; Rebs: Gérson 7 Asts: Stallworth, Curnell, Gustavinho and Gehrke 2		Pts: Newsome 18; Rebs: Garcés 6 Asts: Mazzarino 7

Ginásio Municipal Hugo Ramos, Mogi das Cruzes

October 2, 2014

Box Score

Club Malvín	81–54	La Salle de Tarija
Pts: Chaney 23; Rebs: Chaney 7 Asts: Mazzarino and Silvarrey 4		Pts: Byro 19; Rebs: Kante 10; Asts: Byro 3

Ginásio Municipal Hugo Ramos, Mogi das Cruzes

October 2, 2014

Box Score

Mogi das Cruzes	68–58	Libertad Sunchales
Pts: Curnell 18; Rebs: Gérson 11; Asts: Gustavinho 3		Pts: Johnson 15; Rebs: Johnson 7 Asts: Slider and Talpone 2

Ginásio Municipal Hugo Ramos, Mogi das Cruzes

=== Group B ===
Host city: Ambato, Ecuador

	Team	W	L	Pts	PF	PA
1	(Ecuador) Comunikt	3	0	6	255	233
2	(Argentina) Boca Juniors	2	1	5	220	213
3	(Chile) Tinguiririca San Fernando	1	2	4	218	226
4	(Venezuela) Aduaneros de Carabobo	0	3	3	214	235

==== Games ====
October 7, 2014

Box Score

Boca Juniors	68–65	Tinguiririca San Fernando
Pts: Sosa Carrión 19; Rebs: Riley 9 Asts: Treise 4		Pts: Morgan 15; Rebs: Wilborn 8 Asts: Evans 2

Coliseo Cerrado de Deportes, Ambato

October 7, 2014

Box Score

Comunikt	84–79	Aduaneros de Carabobo
Pts: Oglivie 21; Rebs: Oglivie 10; Asts: Barrett 5		Pts: Valera Villegas 15; Rebs: Valera Villegas 11; Asts: Manaure Orta 4

Coliseo Cerrado de Deportes, Ambato

October 8, 2014

Box Score

Aduaneros de Carabobo	58–70	Boca Juniors
Pts: Farias Saez 15; Rebs: Lopez Perez 10; Asts: Morillo 5		Pts: Sosa Carrión 14; Rebs: Calderón Rodriguez 10; Asts: Treise 3

Coliseo Cerrado de Deportes, Ambato

October 8, 2014

Box Score

Comunikt	81–72	Tinguiririca San Fernando
Pts: Oglivie 25; Rebs: Oglivie 15; Asts: Rodgers 8		Pts: Valencia Rosales 13; Rebs: Wilborn 8 Asts: Sepulveda Soto 4

Coliseo Cerrado de Deportes, Ambato

October 9, 2014

Box Score

Tinguiririca San Fernando	81–77	Aduaneros de Carabobo
Pts: Sepulveda Soto 18; Rebs: Wilborn 14; Asts: Carrasco Follert 9		Pts: Manaure Orta 24; Rebs: Carrillo Trujillo 14; Asts: Morillo 5

Coliseo Cerrado de Deportes, Ambato

October 9, 2014

Box Score

Comunikt	90–82	Boca Juniors
Pts: Barrett 25; Rebs: Rodgers 8 Asts: Rodgers 10		Pts: Sandes 24; Rebs: Calderón Rodriguez 8 Asts: Treise 9

Coliseo Cerrado de Deportes, Ambato

=== Group C ===
Host city: Montevideo, Uruguay

	Team	W	L	Pts	PF	PA
1	(Brazil) Limeira	2	1	5	247	194
2	(Argentina) Argentino de Junin	2	1	5	225	217
3	(Uruguay) Club Atlético Aguada	2	1	5	255	237
4	(Ecuador) Importadora Alvarado	0	3	3	203	282

=== Group D ===
Host city: Bauru, Brazil

	Team	W	L	Pts	PF	PA
1	(Brazil) Bauru	3	0	6	270	221
2	(Brazil) Brasília	1	2	4	267	265
3	(Uruguay) Defensor Sporting	1	2	4	270	282
4	(Colombia) Guerreros de Bogotá	1	2	4	222	261

== Semifinals ==
=== Group E ===
Host city: Buenos Aires, Argentina

	Team	W	L	Pts	PF	PA
1	(Argentina) Boca Juniors	2	1	5	232	225
2	(Uruguay) Club Malvín	2	1	5	235	212
3	(Argentina) Argentino de Junin	1	2	4	222	242
4	(Brazil) Limeira	1	2	4	235	245

=== Group F ===
Host city: Mogi das Cruzes, Brazil

	Team	W	L	Pts	PF	PA
1	(Brazil) Bauru	3	0	6	296	248
2	(Brazil) Mogi das Cruzes	2	1	5	265	228
3	(Brazil) Brasília	1	2	4	242	254
4	(Ecuador) Comunikt	0	3	3	217	290

== Final Four ==
Host city: Bauru, Brazil

Semifinals; 25 November 2014
(Brazil) Bauru	103
(Uruguay) Club Malvín	57
(Argentina) Boca Juniors	85
(Brazil) Mogi das Cruzes	87

Final; 27 November 2014
(Brazil) Bauru	79
(Brazil) Mogi das Cruzes	53
Third place
(Uruguay) Club Malvín	75
(Argentina) Boca Juniors	76

== Statistical leaders ==
=== Individual averages ===
Points

Pos.	Name	G	PPG
1	Guilherme Giovannoni (BRA)	6	22.0
2	Scott Rodgers (CKT)	6	21.0
3	Robert Day (BAU)	6	18.2
4	Rafael Hettsheimeir (BAU)	6	17.5
5	Rasheem Barrett (CKT)	6	16.7

Rebounds

Pos.	Name	G	RPG
1	Bruno Fiorotto (LIM)	6	9.5
2	Gérson do Espírito Santo (MOG)	6	9.2
3	Rafael Hettsheimeir (BAU)	6	7.7
4	Guilherme Giovannoni (BRA)	6	7.0
5	Rafael de Souza (LIM)	6	6.8

Assists

Pos.	Name	G	APG
1	Franco Balbi (JUN)	6	8.0
2	Ricardo Fischer (BAU)	6	6.2
3	Scott Rodgers (CKT)	6	5.3
4	Fúlvio de Assis (BRA)	4	7.5
5	Welington dos Santos (LIM)	5	5.8

Blocks

Pos.	Name	G	BPG
1	Elgrace Wilborn (TSF)	3	3.7
2	Mathias Calfani (MAL)	6	1.7
3	Ronald Reis (BRA)	6	1.7
4	Lamar Roberson (IMP)	3	2.3
5	Scott Vandermeer (MAL)	3	2.0

Steals

Pos.	Name	G	SPG
1	Scott Rodgers (CKT)	6	2.8
2	Tyrone Curnell (MOG)	6	2.3
3	David Jackson (LIM)	6	2.3
4	Richard Chaney (MAL)	6	1.8
5	Franco Balbi (JUN)	6	1.7

Efficiency

Pos.	Name	G	Eff
1	TBD (TBD)	TBD	TBD
2	TBD (TBD)	TBD	TBD
3	TBD (TBD)	TBD	TBD
4	TBD (TBD)	TBD	TBD
5	TBD (TBD)	TBD	TBD

Source: Fiba Americas - Liga Sudamericana
