= División Mayor del Básquetbol de Chile =

Professional basketball league in Chile

The División Mayor del Básquetbol de Chile, DIMAYOR (officially the Copa Club Kino for sponsorship reasons), was one of the national professional basketball leagues in Chile, along with the Liga Nacional Movistar. The league was created in 1979 and was discontinued in 2013.

== Teams participating in 2012 ==
- San Luis de Quillota
- Liceo Mixto (Los Andes)
- Municipal Quilicura
- Universidad Católica (Santiago)
- DUOC UC (Santiago)
- Tinguiririca San Fernando
- Deportivo Virginio Gómez (Concepción)
- Universidad de Concepción

== List of Champions ==
- 1979: Thomas Bata
- 1980: Sportiva Italiana
- 1981: Español de Talca
- 1982: Sportiva Italiana
- 1983: Universidad Católica
- 1984: Universidad Católica
- 1985: Universidad Católica
- 1986: Universidad Católica
- 1987: Deportes Ancud
- 1988: Deportivo Petrox UBB
- 1989: Deportes Ancud
- 1990: Deportivo Petrox
- 1991: Deportivo Petrox
- 1992: Deportivo Petrox
- 1993: Universidad de Temuco
- 1994: Universidad de Temuco
- 1995: Universidad de Concepción
- 1996: Colo-Colo
- 1997: Universidad de Concepción
- 1998: Universidad de Concepción
- 1999: Provincial Osorno
- 2000: Provincial Osorno
- 2001: Deportivo Valdivia
- 2002: Provincial Llanquihue Puerto Varas
- 2003: Provincial Llanquihue Puerto Varas
- 2004: Provincial Osorno
- 2005: Universidad Católica
- 2006: Provincial Osorno
- 2007: Liceo Mixto Los Andes
- 2008: Liceo Mixto Los Andes
- 2009: Liceo Mixto Los Andes
- 2010: Universidad de Los Lagos Puerto Montt
- 2011: Liceo Mixto Los Andes
- 2012: Universidad de Concepción
