= 2006 boys high school basketball All-Americans =

Honorary sports team

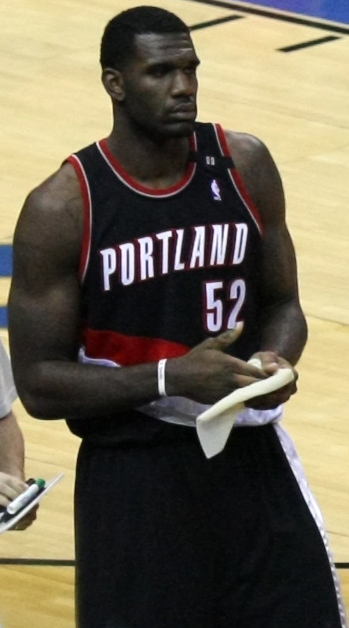
Greg Oden was the first 2006 high school boys' basketball All-American drafted into the National Basketball Association.

An All-American team is an honorary sports team that is generally composed of the best amateur players of a specific season for each team position—who in turn are given the honorific "All-America" and typically referred to as "All-American athletes", or simply "All-Americans". The term is used in U.S. team sports to refer to players who are selected by members of the national media. Walter Camp selected the first All-America team in the early days of American football in 1889.

Both the McDonald's All-American team selection and the Jordan Brand All-American team selection have associated high school basketball all-star games held in conjunction with them, in which the players are divided into two teams to compete in an exhibition game. The Jordan Brand held its first contest in 2002. McDonald's All-Americans have competed in such contests since 1977, and a girls' game was added in 2002. Both the Parade and USA Today lists included underclassmen, but fifth-year seniors were ineligible for the Parade team. Those lists also both designated ordinal teams as first team, second team, etc., while the McDonald's and Jordan Brand teams were selected without distinction among selectees. In basketball, some All-American teams are composed by position, while others were not.

In 2006, 47 boys' high-school basketball players were selected to major honorary All-American teams. For the 2006 selections, McDonald's selected 24 players to its All-American team; the Jordan Brand included 21 players, and the USA Today All-USA prep basketball team had 15. The list also includes the 40 Parade All-Americans, the largest of the four teams. The 2006 class of McDonald's All-Americans is regarded as the best class of the decade, with approximately 22 of the 24 expected to make it to the National Basketball Association by the time they have exhausted their collegiate eligibility, which in most cases is four years of competition in five years of enrollment.

Sherron Collins, Kevin Durant, Wayne Ellington, Spencer Hawes, Tywon Lawson, Greg Oden, Brandan Wright and Thaddeus Young were named to all four lists. Among this group, Durant, Hawes, Lawson and Oden were selected to the first team of both organizations that enumerated their selections. Collins was the only one of these to go undrafted. Oden and Derrick Rose were both NBA draft overall number-one selections, in 2007 and 2008, respectively. Gerald Henderson Jr. was the highest selection in the 2009 NBA draft (12th overall). Damion James and Stanley Robinson were the only selections from this group in the 2010 NBA draft. Kyle Singler and Vernon Macklin were the final draftees from this group in the 2011 NBA draft.

== All-American teams ==
The table below details the selections for four major 2006 boys' high-school basketball All-American teams. For those teams where teams were enumerated as first, second, etc. team, the number corresponding to this designation appears in the table. For teams where no such enumeration exists, a check mark is used. The following columns are included in the table:

Player – The name of the High School All-American
College – Collegiate affiliation
Draft – The NBA draft Year
Position – Overall position that the player was chosen in his draft year
McD – McDonald's All-American Team
Parade – Parade All-America Team
Jordan – Jordan Brand All-American Team
USAT – USA Today All-USA Team
N/A – not drafted
TBD – will be eligible for the draft at a future time
??? – remaining eligibility not clear in currently available sources
— – player not named to any team by that selector

Player	College	Draft	Position	McD	Parade	Jordan	USAT	Notes
Darrell Arthur	Kansas	2008	27	✓	3	—	3	—
D. J. Augustin	Texas	2008	9	✓	4	—	—	—
Jerryd Bayless	Arizona	2008	11	—	4	—	—	—
Michael Beasley	Kansas State	2008	2	—	2	—	3	—
Chase Budinger	Arizona	2009	44	✓	1	—	3	—
Tweety Carter	Baylor	2010	N/A	✓	3	✓	—	—
Earl Clark	Louisville	2009	14	✓	4	—	—	—
Sherron Collins	Kansas	2010	N/A	✓	3	✓	2	—
Mike Conley Jr.	Ohio State	2007	4	✓	3	—	—	—
Daequan Cook	Ohio State	2007	21	✓	3	—	—	—
Duke Crews	Tennessee/Bowie State	2010	N/A	—	3	✓	—	—
Javaris Crittenton	Georgia Tech	2007	19	✓	3	—	—	—
Kevin Durant	Texas	2007	2	✓	1	✓	1	2007 NCAA National Player of the Year (AP, FOX, NABC, Naismith, Rupp, SN, USBWA-Robertson, Wooden)
Wayne Ellington	North Carolina	2009	28	✓	1	✓	2	2009 NCAA basketball tournament Most Outstanding Player
Eric Gordon	Indiana	2008	7	—	4	—	—	—
Paul Harris	Syracuse	2009	N/A	—	—	✓	2	—
Spencer Hawes	Washington	2007	10	✓	1	✓	1	—
Gerald Henderson Jr.	Duke	2009	12	✓	2	—	—	—
Damion James	Texas	2010	24	—	2	—	3	—
Mike Jones	—	N/A	N/A	—	—	✓	—	—
James Keefe	UCLA	2010	N/A	✓	2	—	—	—
Curtis Kelly	Kansas State	2011	N/A	—	—	✓	—	—
Jon Kreft	Florida State	N/A	N/A	—	—	✓	—	—
Tywon Lawson	North Carolina	2009	18	✓	1	✓	1	—
Brook Lopez	Stanford	2008	10	✓	3	—	—	—
Robin Lopez	Stanford	2008	15	✓	3	—	—	—
Kevin Love	UCLA	2008	5	—	1	—	3	2007 National Player of the Year (Gatorade, McDonald's, Naismith, Parade, USA Today)
Vernon Macklin	Florida/Georgetown	2011	52	✓	2	✓	—	—
O. J. Mayo	USC	2008	3	—	1	—	1	—
Raymar Morgan	Michigan State	2010	N/A	—	4	—	—	—
Obi Muonelo	Oklahoma State	2010	N/A	—	—	✓	—	—
Greg Oden	Ohio State	2007	1	✓	1	✓	1	2005 National Player of the Year (Gatorade, Parade); 2006 National Player of the Year (Gatorade, McDonald's, Naismith, Parade, USA Today)
Scottie Reynolds	Villanova	2010	N/A	✓	3	—	—	—
Stanley Robinson	Connecticut	2010	59	—	2	—	—	—
Derrick Rose	Memphis	2008	1	—	4	—	—	—
Jon Scheyer	Duke	2010	N/A	✓	1	✓	—	—
DeShawn Sims	Michigan	2010	N/A	—	4	✓	—	—
Kyle Singler	Duke	2011	33	—	2	—	—	2010 NCAA basketball tournament Most Outstanding Player
Jerry Smith	Louisville	2010	N/A	—	4	—	—	—
Edgar Sosa	Louisville	2010	N/A	—	—	✓	—	—
Alex Stepheson	North Carolina/USC	2011	N/A	—	4	—	—	—
DaJuan Summers	Georgetown	2009	35	—	—	✓	—	—
Lance Thomas	Duke	2010	N/A	✓	2	—	—	—
Bill Walker	Kansas State	2008	47	—	2	—	—	—
Brandan Wright	North Carolina	2007	8	✓	1	✓	2	—
Thaddeus Young	Georgia Tech	2007	12	✓	2	✓	2	—
Brian Zoubek	Duke	2010	N/A	—	4	✓	—	—
