= Leones de Potosí =

- League: Libobasquet
- History: Leones de Pontosí (2017–present)
- Arena: Coliseo Ciudad de Potosí
- Location: Potosí, Bolivia
- Head coach: Diego D'Andrea
- Championships: 1 (2023)

Club Leones Potosi Basquetbol, more commonly known as Leones de Potosí, are a Bolivian professional basketball team located in Potosí. Founded in 2017, they play in the Libobasquet, the highest level league of basketball in the country, since the 2022 season. Home games are played at the Coliseo Ciudad de Potosí.

They won their first ever championship under coach Diego D'Andrea in the 2023 season following their 3–1 finals win over Nacional Potosí.

The Leones played in the Liga Sudamericana de Baloncesto in 2023.

== Honours ==
Libobasquet

- Champions (1): 2023
