= Español de Talca =

- Nickname: El Quijote; Los de Colonia; Los Hispanos
- Leagues: LNB Chile; FIBA Americas League
- Founded: 1978; 47 years ago
- Arena: Gimnasio Regional (occasional games in Gimnasio Cendyr Sur)
- Capacity: 4,500
- Team colors: Red, Yellow
- President: Víctor Montecinos
- Head coach: Santiago Gomez
- Championships: 3 Liga Nacional; 1 Dimayor; 1 Dimayor Apertura
- Website: www.espanoldetalca.cl
Home	Away

Club Deportivo Español de Talca, commonly known as Español de Talca, is a Chilean basketball club based in Talca. Founded in 1978, the team plays in the LNB Chile.

In 2018, the team played in the FIBA Americas League, where the club had a 0–3 record in the group phase.

== Trophies ==
- Liga Nacional: 3
  - 2010, 2012-13, 2016-17
- Dimayor: 1
  - 1981
- Dimayor Apertura: 1
  - 2001

== Notable players ==
- (United States) Stanley Robinson
- (United States) Tyran Walker
