= Earl Watson (basketball, born 1990) =

American basketball player (born 1990)

Free Agent
- Position: Power forward / center

Personal information
- Born: September 14, 1990 (age 36) Fort Pierce, Florida
- Listed height: 6 ft 7 in (2.01 m)
- Listed weight: 255 lb (116 kg)

Career information
- High school: Fort Pierce Central (Fort Pierce, Florida); Queen City Prep (Charlotte, North Carolina)
- College: Chipola JC (2011–2013); Rhode Island (2014–2016)
- NBA draft: 2016: undrafted
- Playing career: 2016–present

Career history
- 2016–2017: Kolossos Rodou
- 2017: Capitol Montevideo
- 2017: SCM U Craiova
- 2017–2018: IRT Tanger
- 2018–2019: Ourense
- 2019–2020: Fundación Granada
- 2020–2021: Legia Warszawa

Earl Watson (born September 14, 1990) is an American professional basketball player who last played for Legia Warszawa of the Polish Basketball League. Standing at 2.01 m (6 ft 7 in), he plays both the power forward and the center positions. After two years at Chipola Junior College and two years at Rhode Island Watson entered the 2016 NBA draft but was not selected in the draft's two rounds.

== High school career ==
Watson played high school basketball at Fort Pierce Central at Fort Pierce, Florida and at Queen City Prep Academy, at Charlotte, North Carolina.

== College career ==
After graduating from high school, Watson was originally inked a National Letter of Intent to attend Wichita State. In the end, he attended Chipola Junior College, where he stayed until 2013. As a freshman with the Indians, Watson averaged 6.5 points and 5.3 rebounds while making 57% of his field goal attempts. During the 2012–13 season, he averaged 9.5 points, 6.4 rebounds, and 1.0 blocks, connecting on 54.0% of his shots from the floor. The next two years, Watson played with the Rhode Island. As a senior, he averaged 5.5 points, 5.2 rebounds and 1 block per game, in 32 games with the Rams.

== Professional career ==
After going undrafted in the 2016 NBA draft, Watson signed with Kolossos Rodou of the Greek Basket League. After his spell with Kolossos, he joined Capitol Montevideo of the Uruguayan League.

On July 31, 2017, Watson joined SCM CSU Craiova of the Romanian League. On November 23, 2017, he left Craiova and joined IRT Tanger in the Nationale 1. On August 26, 2018, Watson signed with Río Ourense Termal of the LEB Oro.

On June 25, 2020, he has signed with Legia Warszawa of the Polish Basketball League.
