= Franco Morales =

Chilean basketball player

Personal information
- Born: 30 June 1992 (age 34) Talca, Chile
- Listed height: 1.80 m (5 ft 11 in)

Career information
- Playing career: 2009–present
- Position: Point guard

Career history
- 2014: Bucaros Freskaleche
- 2016–2021: Las Ánimas de Valdivia
- 2026: Toros Laguna

Career highlights
- 2018 Champion of the Liga Nacional de Básquetbol de Chile

Franco Patricio Morales Ordenes (born 30 June 1992) is a Chilean professional basketball player for ABA Ancud of the Liga Nacional de Básquetbol de Chile.

== Professional career ==
Morales signed with Las Ánimas de Valdivia in 2016. In August 2018, he signed for four more seasons.

== National team ==
He has been a member of Chile's national basketball team on many occasions, including the 2019 FIBA Basketball World Cup qualification.
