= Pichincha de Potosí =

Bolivian basketball team

- Nickname: Toro Rojo (Red Bull); La Vieja Casona
- Leagues: Libobasquet; Liga Sudamericana de Básquetbol
- Founded: 7 April 1937; 87 years ago
- History: Pichincha de Potosí; 1937–present
- Arena: Ciudad de Potosí Coliseum
- Capacity: 8,000
- Location: Potosí, Bolivia
- President: Eloy Alzu
- Head coach: Fabricio Salas
- Ownership: Colegio Nacional Pichincha
- Championships: 2 (2019, 2022)
Home	Away

Club Deportivo y Cultural Pichincha de Potosí is a Bolivian professional basketball team. It is the basketball team of the Colegio Nacional Pichincha university.

The team won the Libobasquet championship twice, in 2019 and 2022. According to the Bolivian newspaper Los Tiempos, several factors have contributed to the team’s success, including good management, economic and governmental support, and mainly the support of the people. As it is with the other Potosi competitors, namely Calero and Nacional, many of the former students of the clubs' prestigious schools today contribute financially, in addition to attending the games.

The Government of Potosí invested in the improvement of the Ciudad de Potosí coliseum, mainly with the installation of the floating floor, new giraffes for the boards and electronic meters.

Games between Pichincha and Calero normally draw around 5,000 spectators.

== Honours ==
Libobasquet

- Champions (2): 2019, 2022

== Notable players ==
- Set a club record or won an individual award as a professional player.
- Played at least one official international match for his senior national team at any time.

- (Bolivia) Ronald Arze
- (Bolivia) Rene Calvo
- (Brazil) Lucas Tischer
- (United States) Andrew Jones
