= Kohl Meyer =

American-born Mexican basketball player (born 1993)

Personal information
- Born: 30 November 1993 (age 32) San Diego, California, U.S.
- Listed height: 6 ft 3 in (1.91 m)
- Listed weight: 188 lb (85 kg)

Career information
- College: University of Puget Sound (2016–2017)
- NBA draft: 2017: undrafted
- Playing career: 2017–present
- Position: Point guard

Career history
- 2017–2019: Soles de Mexicali
- 2019: Aguacateros de Michoacán
- 2020: Plateros de Fresnillo
- 2021: Leñadores de Durango
- 2022: Plateros de Fresnillo
- 2023: Mineros de Zacatecas
- 2023–2024: Halcones de Xalapa

Kohl Gerhard Meyer (born 30 November 1993) is an American-born Mexican professional basketball player for the Halcones de Xalapa of the LNBP and the Mexican national team.

== Career ==
Meyer made his debut in the 2017 season with the Soles de Mexicali to play in the LNBP, he also have played for the teams Aguacateros de Michoacán, Plateros de Fresnillo, Leñadores de Durango, Mineros de Zacatecas and Halcones de Xalapa from the same league.

== National team career ==
He was a member of the Mexican national team that participated in the 2023 Pan American Games.
