= C.A. Nacional Potosí (basketball) =

- League: Libobasquet
- Founded: 2017
- History: C.A. Nacional Potosí (2017–present)
- Arena: Coloseo Ciudad de Potosí
- Location: Potosí, Bolivia
- Championships: 2 (2021, 2024)

Club Atlético Nacional Potosí Básquetbol, commonly known as Nacional Potosí, is a Bolivian basketball team based in Potosí. It is part of the homonymous sports club which started its basketball affiliation in 2017. They play in the Libobasquet, the highest level league in the country, since 2019 in which they were promoted from the second level division.

Nacional won the private-organised LNB league in 2022 after losing just one game in their campaign. They won their second title in 2024.

== Honours ==
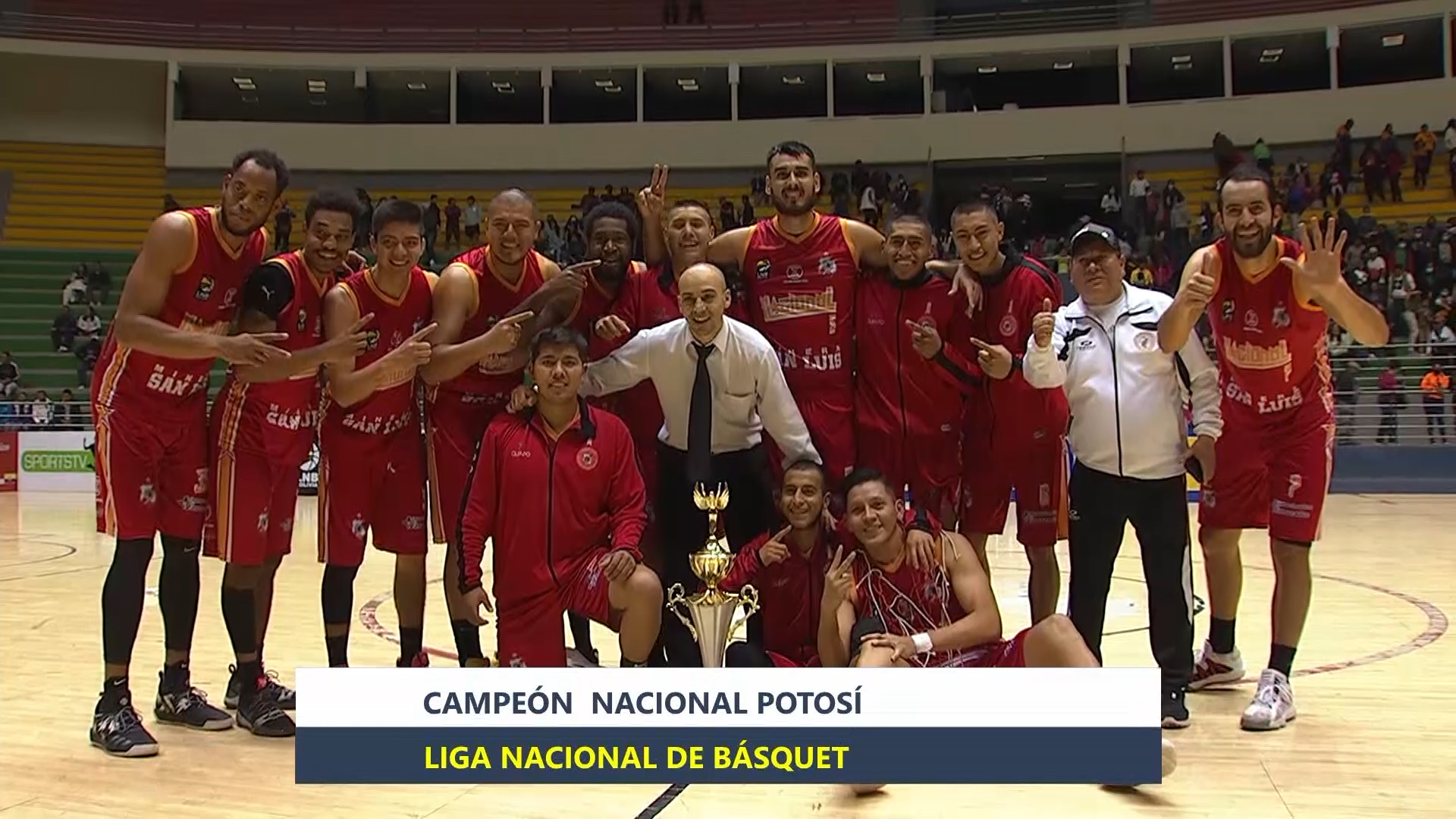
Nacional celebrating winning the 2022 LNB championship

Libobasquet

- Champions (2): 2021, 2024
- Runners-up (2): 2019, 2023

Liga Superior del Básquetbol Boliviano (2nd tier)

- Champions (1): 2019

LNB

- Champions (1): 2022

== Head coaches ==
- Gaston Fernández (2019)
- Diego D'Andrea (2021)
- Enrique Lancelotti (2022–present)
