= Malik Curry =

American basketball player (born 1999)

No. 7 – Defensor Sporting
- League: Liga Uruguaya de Básquetbol

Personal information
- Born: February 7, 1999 (age 27) New Castle, Delaware, U.S.
- Listed height: 6 ft 1 in (1.85 m)
- Listed weight: 180 lb (82 kg)

Career information
- High school: St. Elizabeth (New Castle, Delaware)
- College: Palm Beach (2017–2019); Old Dominion (2019–2021); West Virginia (2021–2022)
- NBA draft: 2022: undrafted
- Playing career: 2022–present

Career history
- 2022–2023: ETHA Engomis
- 2023: Al-Rayyan Doha
- 2023–2024: Defensor Sporting
- 2024: Mineros de Zacatecas
- 2024–2025: Defensor Sporting
- 2025: Al-Rayyan Doha

Malik Curry (born February 7, 1999) is an American professional basketball player who played for Al-Rayyan Doha. He played college basketball for the Palm Beach State College, Old Dominion University and West Virginia University.

== College career ==
=== Palm Beach State College (2017-2019) ===
On April 8, 2019, Curry was named to the NJCAA All-America 2nd Team. He led the team in multiple offensive categories and in the conference he finished 2nd in both points-per game and assists. Nationally, he finished 13th in scoring and 16th in assists.

Curry was selected to the 2019 NJCAA All-Star Game in Las Vegas, becoming the first player in the Martin McCann era to be named to the game.

During his time at Palm Beach State College he averaged 21.9 points, 5.9 rebounds and 6.3 assists per game. He was Second Team Junior College All-American, FCSAA Southern Conference Player of the Year, two-time FCSAA Player of the Week and First Team All FCSAA Southern Conference.

=== Old Dominion University (2019-2021) ===
In May 2019, Curry transferred to Old Dominion University for the 2019–2020 season.

In March 2021, Curry was named to the All-Conference USA Second Team. He started in every game he had played for Old Dominion the 2020–2021 season. He led the team in scoring, assists, steals, three-point percentage and free-throw percentage. Curry was also named to the National Association of Basketball Coaches All-District 11 Second Team.

=== West Virginia University (2021-2022) ===
In April 2021, Curry transferred to West Virginia University for the 2021–2022 season.

In December 2021, Curry rolled his ankle and was taken out the game in the first half of the UAB game.

In May 2022, Curry participated in the Tampa Bay Pro Combine where he was awarded the Most Valuable Player of game two. He had 24 points, 7 rebounds 5 assists and 2 blocks. His point total was tied for second-most at the combine.

== Professional career ==
=== ETHA Engomis (2022-2023) ===
On August 18, 2022, Curry signed his first professional contract with ETHA Engomis for the 2022-2023 season. On October 11, 2022, Curry received a Hoops Agent Player of the Week award. He had 36 points, 8 rebounds and 2 assists for his team's victory. On October 17, 2022, Curry received a Hoops Agents Player of the Week award for Round 2. He had 29 points, 5 rebounds and 4 assists for his team. He was the league's best scorer averaging 32.5 points per game. On November 7th, he received a Hoops Agents Player of the Week award after having 36 points and 11 rebounds. On November 29th, he received another Hoops Agents Player of the Week award. He had 37 points, 6 rebounds and 2 assists in his team's victory.

=== Al-Rayyan Doha (2023 & 2025) ===
On March 1, 2023, Curry signed with Al-Rayyan Doha for the season. He started the season with ETHA Engomis where he averaged 26.9 points, 5.9 rebounds and 4.1 assists per game. He was also voted the League Player of the Week four times in Cyprus.

=== Defensor Sporting (2023-2024 & 2024-2025) ===
On December 14, 2023, Curry received a Hoops Agents Player of the Week award for Round 13. He had 29 points, 6 rebounds, and 5 assists for the teams win.On September 4, 2024, Curry signed to re-join Defensor Sporting Club.

On October 24, 2024, Curry received a Hoops Agents Player of the Week award for Round 6. He had a game-high 21 points, 4 rebounds, and 6 assists.

== Personal life ==
Curry's father, Herman Curry, was murdered in front of hundreds of people during a soccer tournament in Wilmington, DE when Curry was 13.

Curry became a father in 2020 to a son.

Curry is the youngest of six children.
