= Osorno Básquetbol =

- Leagues: Liga Nacional de Básquetbol de Chile
- Founded: 2009
- Dissolved: 2019
- Arena: Monumental María Gallardo
- Capacity: 4,500
- Location: Osorno, Chile
- Team colors: Blue, White
- President: Carlos Vera (last)
- Head coach: Rodrigo Isbej (last)
- Championships: 1 Liga Saesa
Home	Away

Osorno Básquetbol was a Chilean basketball club based in Osorno, Los Lagos Region. The club was established on November 19, 2009. The club played in the Liga Nacional de Chile.

The Liga Nacional home games were played at the Gimnasio María Gallardo; some of the Liga Saesa games were played at the Gimansio Español.

The club was expelled from the Liga Nacional in February 2019 for two years, and the club itself was folded due to the financial difficulties.

== Trophies ==
- Liga Saesa/Libsur: 1
  - 2014

== Coaches ==
(Chile) Ricardo Bello (2010)

(Chile) Mario Negrón (2011-2012)

(Argentina) Juan Manuel Córdoba (2012-2015)

(Chile) Rodrigo Isbej (2015-2017)

(Chile) Carlos Schwarzenberg (2017)

(Costa Rica) Eddie Bermúdez (2017)

(Venezuela) Jorge Arrieta (2017)

(Cuba) Yudi Abreu (2018)

(Chile) Rodrigo Isbej (2018-2019)
