= Colegio Los Leones de Quilpué =

Chilean basketball team

- Leagues: Liga Sudamericana de Básquetbol; Liga Nacional de Básquetbol de Chile
- Founded: 2009
- Arena: Gimnasio Colegio Los Leones
- Capacity: 800
- Location: Quilpué, Chile
- Head coach: José Angel Samaniego
- Championships: 3 Liga Nacional de Básquetbol de Chile; 2 Copa Chile
- Website: Official website
Home	Away

Colegio Los Leones de Quilpué is a Chilean professional basketball club from Quilpué, the capital of the Marga Marga Province in central Chile. The team competes in the international Liga Sudamericana de Básquetbol and the national Liga Nacional de Básquetbol de Chile.

Los Leones won their first LNB Chile championship in the 2023–24 season.

== Trophies ==
- Liga Nacional de Básquetbol de Chile: 3
  - 2024, T-2025, A-2026.
- Copa Chile: 2
  - 2016, 2025.

== Notable players ==
- Set a club record or won an individual award as a professional player.
- Played at least one official international match for his senior national team at any time.

- (Chile) Ignacio Carrion
- (Chile) Eduardo Marechal
- (United States) John Taylor
