= Deportes Castro =

- Leagues: Liga Nacional de Básquetbol de Chile
- Founded: 2003
- Arena: Gimnasio Municipal de Castro (1,300 spectators)
- Location: Castro, Chile
- Team colors: Green, White
- President: Cristian Correa
- Head coach: Guillermo Narvarte
- Championships: 1 Liga Nacional; 1 Liga Saesa
- Website: Official website
Home	Away

Club Deportes Castro, also known as Naviera Ulloa de Castro, is a Chilean professional basketball team based in Castro on Chiloé Island, Los Lagos Region, Chile. The team has competed in the Liga Nacional de Básquetbol de Chile and play their matches at the Gimnasio Municipal de Castro.

Club Deportes Castro began operating in 2000 before it was formally created in February 2003. In the 2011–12 season, the team won the Liga Nacional for the first time, defeating Club Deportivo Boston College in the final. As a result, they represented Chile in the Liga Sudamericana de Baloncesto.

For financial reasons, Naviera Ulloa de Castro declined to take part in the 2025 season.

== History ==
In 2000, Club Deportes Castro began operating on an unofficial basis coaching and playing basketball. The club was formally established on 12 February 2003. Based in Castro on Chiloé Island, Los Lagos Region, Chile, the team play their matches at the Gimnasio Municipal de Castro.

In 2012, the club achieved its first Liga Nacional de Básquetbol de Chile title. After qualifying for the semi-finals, they defeated Club Deportivo Español de Osorno in the first two matches in the best of five series. However, Osorno fought back to level the series at two games each. In the decider, Club Deportes Castro were victorious and advanced to the final. Club Deportes Castro faced Club Deportivo Boston College in the final. The match was tied at 87–87 after regulation time. In overtime, Club Deportes Castro edged out their rivals with the final score 97–92. As a result, they qualified for the Liga Sudamericana de Baloncesto.

Ahead of the 2025 season, Naviera Ulloa de Castro declined to take part citing financial reasons.
