= C.D. Universidad de Concepción (basketball) =

Basketball team in Concepción, Chile

Universidad de Concepción
- Nickname: UdeC
- Leagues: Liga Nacional
- Founded: 1979
- Arena: Casa del Deporte
- Capacity: 2,000
- Location: Concepción, Biobio Region
- Team colors: Yellow, Dark Blue
- President: Mariano Campos
- Head coach: Cipriano Núñez
- Championships: 2 Liga Nacional; 4 Dimayor; 2 Copa Chile; 2 Supercopa; 2 Dimayor Centro-Sur; 1 Dimayor Apertura
- Website: laudeconce.cl
Home	Away

Club Deportivo Universidad de Concepción, also known as UdeC, is a Chilean basketball club based in the city of Concepción, Biobio Region. The sports club was officially founded August 8, 1994, but the professional basketball team begun in 1979, with the start of the Dimayor, the former Chilean professional League.

Their home games are played at the Casa del Deporte gym, located inside the Universidad de Concepción campus.

== Trophies ==
- Liga Nacional: 2
  - 2021, 2022
- Dimayor: 4
  - 1995, 1997, 1998, 2012
- Copa Chile: 2
  - 2014, 2022-23
- Supercopa: 2
  - 2021, 2022
- Dimayor Centro-Sur: 3
  - 2007, 2008, 2014
- Dimayor Apertura: 1
  - 2009

== Current roster ==
CD Universidad de Concercion roster
Players
Coaches

Pos.	No.	Nat.	Name	Ht.
G	1	(Panama)	[[Eugenio Luzcando {{{last}}} |Eugenio Luzcando {{{last}}}]]	6 ft 2 in (1.88 m)
G	3	(Chile)	[[Eduardo Marechal {{{last}}} |Eduardo Marechal {{{last}}}]]	6 ft 1 in (1.85 m)
F	7	(Chile)	[[Michael Rivera {{{last}}} |Michael Rivera {{{last}}}]]	6 ft 3 in (1.91 m)
G	8	(Chile)	[[Sebastián Carrasco {{{last}}} |Sebastián Carrasco {{{last}}}]]	5 ft 11 in (1.80 m)
C	13	(Chile)	[[Andrés Domínguez {{{last}}} |Andrés Domínguez {{{last}}}]]	6 ft 9 in (2.06 m)
G	22	(Chile)	[[Evandro Arteaga {{{last}}} |Evandro Arteaga {{{last}}}]]	5 ft 9 in (1.75 m)
F	23	(Chile)	[[Kevin Rubio {{{last}}} (basketball)|Kevin Rubio {{{last}}}]]	6 ft 2 in (1.88 m)
F	24	(United States)	[[Reyshawn Terry {{{last}}} |Reyshawn Terry {{{last}}}]]	6 ft 8 in (2.03 m)
C	25	(Venezuela)	[[Carlos Milano Páez {{{last}}} |Carlos Milano Páez {{{last}}}]]	6 ft 6 in (1.98 m)
F	30	(Chile)	[[Diego Silva {{{last}}} (basketball)|Diego Silva {{{last}}}]]	6 ft 0 in (1.83 m)
F	31	(United States)	[[Miles Bowman {{{last}}} |Miles Bowman {{{last}}}]]	6 ft 8 in (2.03 m)
C	33	(Chile)	[[Lino Sáez {{{last}}} |Lino Sáez {{{last}}}]]	6 ft 9 in (2.06 m)
C	60	(United States)	[[Jerry Evans Jr. {{{last}}} |Jerry Evans Jr. {{{last}}}]]	6 ft 8 in (2.03 m)

== See also ==
- University of Concepción
- C.D. Universidad de Concepción (football team)
