= Tinguiririca San Fernando =

- Nickname: TSF
- Leagues: Liga Nacional
- Founded: 2012
- Arena: Gimnasio Hermanos Maristas
- Capacity: 1,500
- Location: San Fernando, Chile
- Team colors: Blue, White
- President: Alejandro Riquelme Calvo
- Head coach: Cipriano Nuñez
- Championships: 1 LNB
Home	Away

Club Deportivo Tinguiririca San Fernando, commonly referred to as Tinguiririca SF, is a Chilean professional basketball club that is based in the city of San Fernando. They currently participate in the Liga Nacional de Básquetbol.

== History ==
The club was established in July 2012, when he was invited to play in the best basketball sports league in the country, Dimayor. The club is based in the town of San Fernando, in the O'Higgins Region.

In his first season, the sanfernandino team performance was no less, to settle for second place in the regular season, thus classifying the play-offs, where they eventually fall shakes before the cast of the Universidad de Concepción, in a dramatic definition to three games.

After the break initiated by it in the year 2013 the club joined the Liga Nacional Movistar, where he plays from the 2013-14 season, it still champion by defeating in the final Osorno 3-1.

== Players ==
=== Current roster ===
Tinguiririca SF
Players
Coaches

Pos.	#	Nat.	Name	Height
G	4	(Chile)	Francisco Pavez	1.83 m (6 ft 0 in)
F	13	(Chile)	Fernando Schuller	1.84 m (6 ft 1/2 in)
F	12	(Chile)	Pablo Gatica	1.85 m (6 ft 1 in)
G	9	(Chile)	Franco Morales (C)	1.79 m (5 ft 10 1/2 in)
G	6	(Chile)	Javier Castillo	1.82 m (5 ft 11 1/2 in)
G	15	(Chile)	Carlos Aranda	2.00 m (6 ft 6 1/2 in)
C	13	(Chile)	Víctor Venegas	1.76 m (5 ft 9 1/2 in)
C	14	(Chile)	Osven Ledezma	2.01 m (6 ft 7 in)
F	23	(Chile)	Jonathan Celis	1.87 m (6 ft 1 1/2 in)
C	21	(Argentina)	Juan Luis Abeiro	1.98 m (6 ft 6 in)

Head coach
- (Chile) Cipriano Nuñez
Assistant(s)
- (Chile) Christian Jara

Legend
- (DP) Unsigned draft pick
- (FA) Free agent
- (S) Suspended
- Injured

Roster
Updated: June 9, 2016

== Honours ==
Liga Nacional de Básquetbol
2013-14

Liga de Baloncesto del Centro de Chile
Runner-up 2013
