= Libobasquet =

Basketball league in Bolivia

- Sport: Basketball
- Founded: 24 August 2013; 13 years ago
- First season: 2014
- Organizing body: Liga Nacional de Basquetbol
- No. of teams: 10
- Country: Bolivia
- Continent: FIBA Americas
- Most recent champion: Universitario de Sucre (1st title) (2025)
- Most titles: Meta La Salle (3 titles)
- Level on pyramid: 1
- International cup: Liga Sudamericana de Baloncesto

The Liga Boliviana de Básquet (abbreviated as Libobasket) is the top professional basketball league in Bolivia that was founded in 2013. It replaced the Liga Superior de Baloncesto de Bolivia (2007–2012) and División Mayor de Baloncesto Boliviano (1994–2006) as the top-tier basketball league in the country.

== Championships ==
Year	Champion	Runner-up	Finals score
Apertura 2014	La Salle	Amistad	–
Clausura 2014	La Salle	La Salle	2–0
Apertura 2015	Vikingos	La Salle	3–0
Clausura 2015	San Simón	Vikingos	3–0
2016	San Simón (2)	Pichincha de Potosí	3–1
2017	Calero	Pichincha de Potosí	3–0
2018	Calero (2)	Nacional Potosí	3–0
2019	Pichincha de Potosí	Nacional Potosí	3–0
2021	Nacional Potosí	Pichincha de Potosí	2–1
2022	Pichincha de Potosí (2)	Atomico Calero	3–2
2023	Leones de Potosí	Nacional Potosí	3–2
2024	Nacional Potosí	Tarija	3–2
2025	Universitario de Sucre	Nacional Potosí	—

== Current clubs ==
Team	City, Province
CAN Oruro	Oruro
CAN Potosí	Potosí
CARL A-Z	Oruro
Kinwa	La Paz
La Paz	La Paz
Leones de Potosí	Potosí
Pichincha de Potosí	Potosí
Saracho	Oruro
Tarija	Tarija
Universitario de Sucre	Sucre

== Individual awards ==
=== Season MVP ===
Año	Jugador	Equipo
2018	Louis Munks III	Calero
2019	Gregory Curvelo	Rubair
2021	Antone Robinson Jr.	Pichincha
2022	Facundo Sanz	Saracho
2023	Daniel Orresta	Carl A-Z

=== Finals MVP ===
Año	Jugador	Equipo
2018	Louis Munks III	Calero
2019	Antone Robinson Jr.	Pichincha
2021	Adriano Barreras	Nacional Potosí
2022	Adriano Barreras	Pichincha
2023	Ronald Arze	Leones
2024	Adriano Barreras	Nacional Potosí
