= CD Valdivia =

- Leagues: Liga Nacional de Básquetbol de Chile
- Founded: 1986
- Arena: Coliseo Municipal Antonio Azurmendy Riveros
- Capacity: 5,000
- Location: Valdivia, Chile
- Team colors: Red, White
- President: Claus Prützmann
- Head coach: Juan Córdoba
- Championships: 2 Liga Nacional; 1 Dimayor; 3 Liga Saesa
- Website: Official website
Home	Away

Club Deportivo Valdivia is a Chilean professional basketball team located in Valdivia, Chile. The team currently competes in the Liga Nacional de Básquetbol de Chile, where the team won the 2016 and 2019 Championship.

== Trophies ==
- Liga Nacional: 1
  - 2015-16
- Dimayor: 1
  - 2001
- Liga Saesa/Libsur: 3
  - 2011, 2016, 2017

== Current roster ==
Note: Flags indicate national team eligibility at FIBA-sanctioned events. Players may hold other non-FIBA nationalities not displayed.

CD Valdivia roster
Players
Coaches

Pos.	No.	Nat.	Name
G	9	(Argentina)	Nicolas Ferreyra
SG	3	(Chile)	Matias Herrera
SF	8	(United States)	Alex Legion
SG	10	(Chile)	Claudio Naranjo
C	13	(United States)	Khapri Alston
SG	18	(Chile)	Vicente Guaico
PF	20	(Chile)	Gerardo Isla
C	24	(Chile)	Claudio Cabrera
SF	69	(Chile)	Fabian Aguilera
G	17	(Chile)	Pablo Campos
PF	0	(Chile)	Mauricio Konig
G	12	(Chile)	Benjamin Herrera

Head coach

(Argentina) Juan Manuel Cordoba

Legend

- (C) Team captain
- Injured

- Roster
Updated: 7 October 2018

== Notable players ==
To appear in this section a player must have either:

- Set a club record or won an individual award as a professional player.
- Played at least one official international match for his senior national team at any time.

- (Chile) Erik Carrasco
- (Chile) Sebastian Suarez
- (United States) Mario Austin
- (United States) Victor Alexander
