= Las Ánimas de Valdivia =

- Leagues: Liga Nacional
- Founded: 1942
- History: Las Ánimas de Valdiva (1942–present)
- Arena: Coliseo Municipal Antonio Azurmendy
- Capacity: 5,000
- Location: Valdivia, Los Ríos Region
- Team colors: Black, Red
- President: José Méndez
- Head coach: Jorge Luis Alvarez
- Championships: 1 Liga Nacional; 1 Copa Chile; 1 Supercopa
Home	Away

Club de Deportes Las Ánimas, is a Chilean sports club based in the city of Valdivia, Los Ríos Region. The club was founded on October 4, 1942, and took its name from the Las Ánimas neighborhood, located at the north side of the city.

The basketball branch is the most important of the club; boxing, table tennis, & amateur football being the other ones. The football branch played at the third level league between 1994 and 1996.

Their Liga Nacional home games are played at the Coliseo Antonio Azurmendy, also playing some of the Liga Saesa games at the Las Ánimas gym.

== Trophies ==
- Liga Nacional: 1
  - 2017-18
- Copa Chile: 1
  - 2018
- Supercopa: 1
  - 2019

== Notable players ==
- Set a club record or won an individual award as a professional player.
- Played at least one official international match for his senior national team at any time.

- (Chile) Franco Morales
