= Liga Nacional de Básquetbol de Chile =

Chilean basketball league

Liga Chery 2025 by Cecinas Llanquihue
- Sport: Basketball
- Founded: 2010
- First season: 2010
- Motto: "Qué buena está la Liga!"
- No. of teams: 12
- Countries: Chile
- Confederation: FIBA Americas
- Most recent champions: Colegio Los Leones (3rd title) (A-2026)
- Most titles: Universidad de Concepción (4 titles)
- Broadcaster: CDO
- Level on pyramid: 1
- International cups: Basketball Champions League Americas; Liga Sudamericana de Baloncesto
- Website: LNB.cl

The Liga Nacional de Básquetbol de Chile, also known as the LNB Chile, is the top national basketball leagues in Chile, it is a professional league, organized by the Federación de Básquetbol de Chile. The league was created in 2010 and the old national league, Dimayor was discontinued in 2013, being the only basketball professional league in the country. The league is now referred as Liga Chery 2025 by Cecinas Llanquihue for sponsorship reasons.

== History ==
Founded in 2008 with the objective of forming strong competition from basketball at national level.

Initially there was the creation of three (League A, League B & League C) divisions, but only the latter two were played. In 2010 the League B was renamed the Liga Nacional de Básquetbol, ranking as the main category of the competition, while the League C was renamed Liga Nacional Promocional.

However, that year was constituted the Liga Nacional Superior, vocational and bringing together the country's top clubs.

The inaugural season of the National League had an optimistic hosting, with 12 teams participate in this country. After eliminating Sagrados Corazones and Universidad Católica, Español de Talca met CD Boston College in the finals, winning by a marker 3–1 to become the first champion of the LNB.

In the 2011–12 edition there was a great turnout, with 18 teams, but the defending champion Español de Talca opted to return to the Dimayor. The winner this time was Deportes Castro, who defeated CD Boston College in the finals.

The 2012–13 season saw Español de Talca again crowned champion against CD Boston College, who won their third consecutive sub-championship. The title completed what was nearly a perfect season with only two losses in the tournament, winning Game 4 in overtime.

The 2013–14 season included 16 teams, with debutant team Tinguiririca San Fernando being champions after winning the final 3–1 to Osorno Basketball at the Monumental María Gallardo. With the win Tinguiririca San Fernando became the first team in the Northern Zone to win the championship.

2014–15 saw CSD Colo Colo crowned champion, winning the series 3–2 against Deportes Castro in Chiloé. The championship win earns Colo Colo the honor to represent the country in the Liga Sudamericana de Básquetbol.

== Format ==
All team from Liga Nacional de Básquetbol de Chile teams play each other twice during the regular season. At the end of the regular season, the top eight teams qualify for the playoffs.

== Current teams ==
Liga Uno teams for the 2025 season
Team	Location	Arena	Capacity	Head coach	Kit	Shirt Sponsor
Colegio Los Leones	Quilpué	Gimnasio Colegio Los Leones	800	(Spain) Guillermo Frutos	(Italy) Zeus Sport	(Chile) Knop Laboratorios
Sportiva Italiana	Valparaíso	Arlegui; Fortín Prat	1,200; 3,000	(Chile) Gianluca Pozo	(Chile) Playoff	(Chile) UVM
Colo-Colo	Macul	Centro Entrenamiento Olímpico de Ñuñoa	3,000	(Chile) Ernesto Menchaca	(Italy) Macron	(Chile) Clínica Meds
Universidad Católica	Santiago	Edificio de Deportes UC	1,500	(Argentina) Bernardo Murphy	(Chile) Playmaker	(Chile) CMPC
Municipal Puente Alto	Puente Alto	Gimnasio Municipal de Puente Alto	1,500	(Argentina) Cristián Santander	(Chile) Playoff	(Chile) CMPC
Español de Talca	Talca	Gimnasio Regional	4,500	(Chile) Héctor Vera Alfaro	(Chile) Masitri	(Chile) PF
Universidad de Concepción	Concepción	Casa del Deporte	2,000	(Uruguay) Santiago Gómez	(Italy) Macron	(United States) Mundo
Las Ánimas de Valdivia	Valdivia	Gimnasio de Las Ánimas / Coliseo Antonio Azurmendy	1,000 / 5,000	(Chile) Carlos Zúñiga	(Chile) Playoff	(Chile) Transportes Betancourt
CD Valdivia	Valdivia	Coliseo Municipal Antonio Azurmendy	5,000	(Argentina) Juan Manuel Jápez	(Chile) Live PRO	(Curaçao) Rojabet
Español de Osorno	Osorno	Gimnasio Monumental María Gallardo	4,500	(Argentina) Jorge Luis Álvarez	(Chile) Playoff	(Estonia) Coolbet
Atlético Puerto Varas	Puerto Varas	Gimnasio Fiscal de Puerto Varas	1,300	(Argentina) Damián Gamarra	(Chile) Evensport	(Chile) Cecinas Llanquihue
ABA Ancud	Ancud	Gimnasio Fiscal de Ancud	2,500	(Chile) Cipriano Núñez	(Argentina) Playoff	(Chile) Conservas Angelmó

== Original league system ==
Category	Division
1º	Liga Nacional de Básquetbol; 12 Teams
2º	Liga Deportiva Nacional; 12 Teams
3º	Liga Nacional Promocional; 24 Teams

== Current system ==
Category	Division
1º	Liga UNO; 15 Teams
2º	Liga DOS; 16 Teams
3º	Liga de Desarollo Febachile (U23); 37 Teams

== Champions ==
Season	Winner	Result	Runners-up	Coach
2010	Español de Talca	3–1	Boston College	Claudio Lavín
2011–12	Deportes Castro	3–1	Boston College	Warren Espinoza
2012–13	Español de Talca	3–1	Boston College	Carlos Iglesias
2013–14	Tinguiririca San Fernando	3–1	Osorno Básquetbol	Pablo Ares Ordenes
2014–15	Colo-Colo	3–2	Deportes Castro	Gabriel Schamberger
2015–16	CD Valdivia	4–2	Universidad de Concepción	Juan Manuel Córdoba
2016–17	Español de Talca	4–2	Osorno Básquetbol	Gabriel Schamberger
2017–18	Las Ánimas de Valdivia	4–1	Colegio Los Leones	Jorge Luis Álvarez
2018–19	CD Valdivia	4–1	Colegio Los Leones	Juan Manuel Córdoba
2019–20	Season cancelled due to the COVID-19 pandemic
2021	Universidad de Concepción	3–1	CD Valdivia	Cipriano Núñez
2022	Universidad de Concepción	4–2	Colegio Los Leones	Cipriano Núñez
2023	Universidad de Concepción	4–1	Colegio Los Leones	Cipriano Núñez
2023–24	Colegio Los Leones	4–1	Español de Osorno	José Ángel Samaniego
2024–25	Universidad de Concepción	4–1	Colegio Los Leones	Santiago Gómez
T-2025	Colegio Los Leones	3–1	CD Valdivia	Guillermo Frutos
A-2026	Colegio Los Leones	77-71	Español de Osorno	Guillermo Frutos

== Championship by team ==
Team	Titles	Runners-up
Universidad de Concepción	4	1
Colegio Los Leones	3	5
Español de Talca	3	-
CD Valdivia	2	2
Deportes Castro	1	1
Tinguiririca San Fernando	1	-
Colo-Colo	1	-
Las Ánimas de Valdivia	1	-
Boston College	-	3
Osorno Básquetbol	-	2
Español de Osorno	-	2
