= 2025 Basketball Champions League Americas Final =

2025 BCL Americas Final
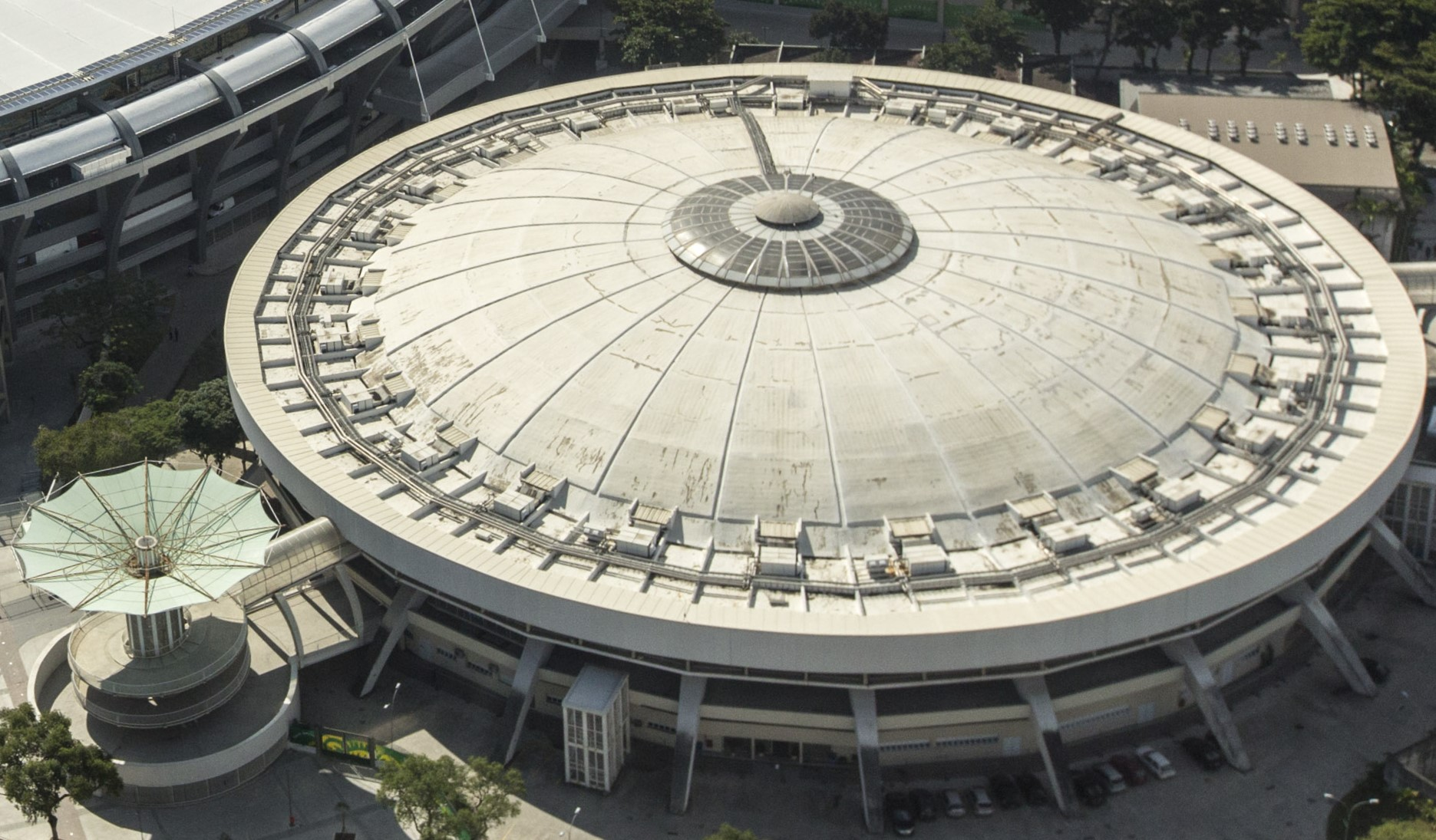
- The Ginásio do Maracanãzinho hosted the Final.
- Event: 2024–25 BCL Americas
Flamengo	Boca Juniors
(Brazil)	(Argentina)
(8–1)	(7–3)
83	57
Head coach: Sergio Hernández	Head coach: Gonzalo Pérez
	1	2	3	4	Total
Flamengo	30	19	11	23	83
Boca Juniors	13	16	16	12	57
- Date: 20 April 2025
- Venue: Ginásio do Maracanãzinho, Rio de Janeiro
- MVP: Alexey Borges
- Referees: Julio Anaya (PAN), Carlos Peralta (ECU), Orlando Varela (HON)

The 2025 BCL Americas Final was the final game of the 2024–25 BCL Americas, the sixth season of the league under its new entity and the 18th of the Pan-American premier basketball league organised by FIBA. It was played at the Ginásio do Maracanãzinho in Rio de Janeiro on 20 April 2025. The game was played between Brazilian club Flamengo and the Argentinean club Boca Juniors.

Flamengo won its fourth continental title, becoming the first Brazilian team to win the competition twice. Also they qualified for 2025 FIBA Intercontinental Cup. Alexey Borges was the team's key player and won the league's MVP award.

== Teams ==
In the following table, finals until 2020 were in the FIBA Americas League and South American Championship eras.

Team	Previous final appearances (bold indicates winners)
(Brazil) Flamengo	6 (**1953**, **2014**, 2020, **2021**, 2023, 2024)
(Argentina) Boca Juniors	None

== Road to the final ==
- (H): Home game
- (A): Away game
- (N): Neutral venue

(Brazil) Flamengo					Round	(Argentina) Boca Juniors				
Opponent	Result				Group phase	Opponent	Result			
(Argentina) Boca Juniors	70–69 (H)				Gameday 1	(Brazil) Flamengo	69–70 (Rio de Janeiro)			
(Panama) Toros de Chiriquí	99–72 (H)				Gameday 2	(Panama) Toros de Chiriquí	92–71 (Rio de Janeiro)			
(Panama) Toros de Chiriquí	96–50 (Panama City)				Gameday 3	(Brazil) Flamengo	61–96 (Panama City)			
(Argentina) Boca Juniors	96–61 (Panama City)				Gameday 4	(Panama) Toros de Chiriquí	83–63 (Panama City)			
(Argentina) Boca Juniors	71–96 (Buenos Aires)				Gameday 5	(Brazil) Flamengo	96–71 (H)			
(Panama) Toros de Chiriquí	110–65 (Buenos Aires)				Gameday 6	(Panama) Toros de Chiriquí	114–70 (H)			
**Group B first place**: Pos / Team / Pld / Pts; **1** / (Brazil) Flamengo / **6** / **11**; 2 / (Argentina) Boca Juniors / 6 / **10**; 3 / (Panama) Toros de Chiriquí / 6 / **6**; Source:					Group phase	**Group B second place**: Pos / Team / Pld / Pts; 1 / (Brazil) Flamengo / 6 / **11**; **2** / (Argentina) Boca Juniors / **6** / **10**; 3 / (Panama) Toros de Chiriquí / 6 / **6**; Source:				
Opponent	Series	Game 1	Game 2	Game 3	Playoffs	Opponent	Series	Game 1	Game 2	Game 3
(Colombia) Paisas	2–0	89–72 (A)	102–65 (H)	–	Quarterfinals	(Nicaragua) Real Estelí	2–1	93–79 (H)	89–97 (A)	72–58 (A)
(Brazil) Sesi Franca	91–67 (H)				Semifinals	(Argentina) Instituto	80–73 (N)			

== Game details ==
20 April 2025	**Flamengo** (Brazil)	**83**–57	(Argentina) Boca Juniors	Rio de Janeiro, Brazil
21:10	Scoring by quarter: **30**–13, **19**–16, 11–**16**, **23**–12
	Pts: Deodato 16; Rebs: Miranda 9 Asts: Borges 6	Boxscore	Pts: Martín Cuello 16; Rebs: Delía 14; Asts: Vildoza 5	Arena: Ginásio do Maracanãzinho; Referees: Julio Anaya (PAN), Carlos Peralta (ECU), Orlando Varela (HON)

2024 BCL Americas champions

**Flamengo**
2nd league title
4th continental title
