= 2024 BCL Americas Final =

- Event: 2023–24 BCL Americas
Flamengo	Quimsa
(Brazil)	(Argentina)
(8–1)	(6–4)
80	92
Head coach: Gustavo de Conti	Head coach: Leandro Ramella
	1	2	3	4	Total
Flamengo	12	21	26	21	80
Quimsa	28	22	20	22	92
- Date: 14 April 2024
- Venue: Estadio Ciudad de Santiago del Estero, Santiago del Estero
- MVP: Brandon Robinson

The 2024 BCL Americas Final was the final game of the 2023–24 BCL Americas, the 5th season of the league under its new entity and the 17th of the Pan-American premier basketball league organised by FIBA. It was played at the Estadio Ciudad de Santiago del Estero in Santiago del Estero on 14 April 2024. The game was played between Brazilian club Flamengo and the Argentinean club Quimsa.

Quimsa won its second continental title, becoming the first team to win twice the competition. Also they qualified for 2024 FIBA Intercontinental Cup. Brandon Robinson was the team's key player and won the league's MVP award.

== Teams ==
In the following table, finals until 2020 were in the FIBA Americas League and South American Championship eras.

Team	Previous final appearances (bold indicates winners)
(Brazil) Flamengo	5 (**1953**, **2014**, 2020, **2021**, 2023)
(Argentina) Quimsa	1 (**2020**)

== Road to the final ==
- (H): Home game
- (A): Away game
- (N): Neutral venue

(Brazil) Flamengo					Round	(Argentina) Quimsa				
Opponent	Result				Group phase	Opponent	Result			
(Uruguay) Hebraica Macabi	92–87 (OT) (H)				Gameday 1	(Brazil) São Paulo	112–65 (H)			
(Argentina) Boca Juniors	62–80 (H)				Gameday 2	(Uruguay) Nacional	86–78 (H)			
(Argentina) Boca Juniors	65-62 (Montevideo)				Gameday 3	(Uruguay) Nacional	86–78 (Buenos Aires)			
(Uruguay) Hebraica Macabi	78-65 (Montevideo)				Gameday 4	(Brazil) São Paulo	84–87 (Buenos Aires)			
(Argentina) Boca Juniors	87–79 (Buenos Aires)				Gameday 5	(Uruguay) Nacional	72–78 (São Paulo)			
(Uruguay) Hebraica Macabi	111–76 (Buenos Aires)				Gameday 6	(Brazil) São Paulo	82–94 (São Paulo)			
**Group C first place**: Pos / Team / Pld / Pts; **1** / (Brazil) Flamengo / **6** / **11**; 2 / (Uruguay) Hebraica Macabi / 6 / **8**; 3 / (Argentina) Boca Juniors / 6 / **8**; Source: BCL Americas					Group phase	**Group B first place**: Pos / Team / Pld / Pts; **1** / (Argentina) Quimsa / **6** / **9**; 2 / (Uruguay) Nacional / 6 / **9**; 3 / (Brazil) São Paulo / 6 / **9**; Source: BCL Americas				
Opponent	Agg.	1st leg	2nd leg	3rd leg	Playoffs	Opponent	Agg.	1st leg	2nd leg	3rd leg
(Argentina) Obras Basket	2–0	113–80 (A)	80–67 (H)	–	Quarterfinals	(Nicaragua) Real Estelí	2–1	98–68 (A)	94–95 (H)	99–69 (H)
(Mexico) Halcones de Xalapa	90–87 (N)				Semifinals	(Uruguay) Hebraica Macabi	89–75 (H)			

== Game details ==
14 April 2024	Flamengo (Brazil)	80–**92**	(Argentina) **Quimsa**	Santiago del Estero, Argentina
22:10	Scoring by quarter: 12–**28**, 21–**22**, **26**–20, 21–**22**
	Pts: Balbi 16; Rebs: Galvanini 7 Asts: Machado 4	Boxscore	Pts: Robinson 23; Rebs: Basabe 14; Asts: Brussino 7	Arena: Estadio Ciudad de Santiago del Estero; Referees: Julio Anaya (PAN), Andrés Bartel (URU), Johnny Batista (PUR)

2024 BCL Americas champions

**Quimsa**
2nd league title
2nd continental title
