= Basketball Champions League Americas All-Star Five =

The Basketball Champions League Americas All-Star Five (Spanish: Quinteto Ideal) is an annual honour awarded by the Basketball Champions League Americas (BCLA) to the five most outstanding players of a given season. The selection is composed of five players and was first made after the 2022–23 season.

== Key ==
^	Denotes players who are still active in the BCL Americas
*	Elected to the Naismith Memorial Basketball Hall of Fame
Player (X)	Denotes the number of times the player has been selected
**Player** **(in bold text)**	Indicates the player who won the Most Valuable Player (MVP) in the same year
G	Guard
F	Forward
C	Center

== Selections ==
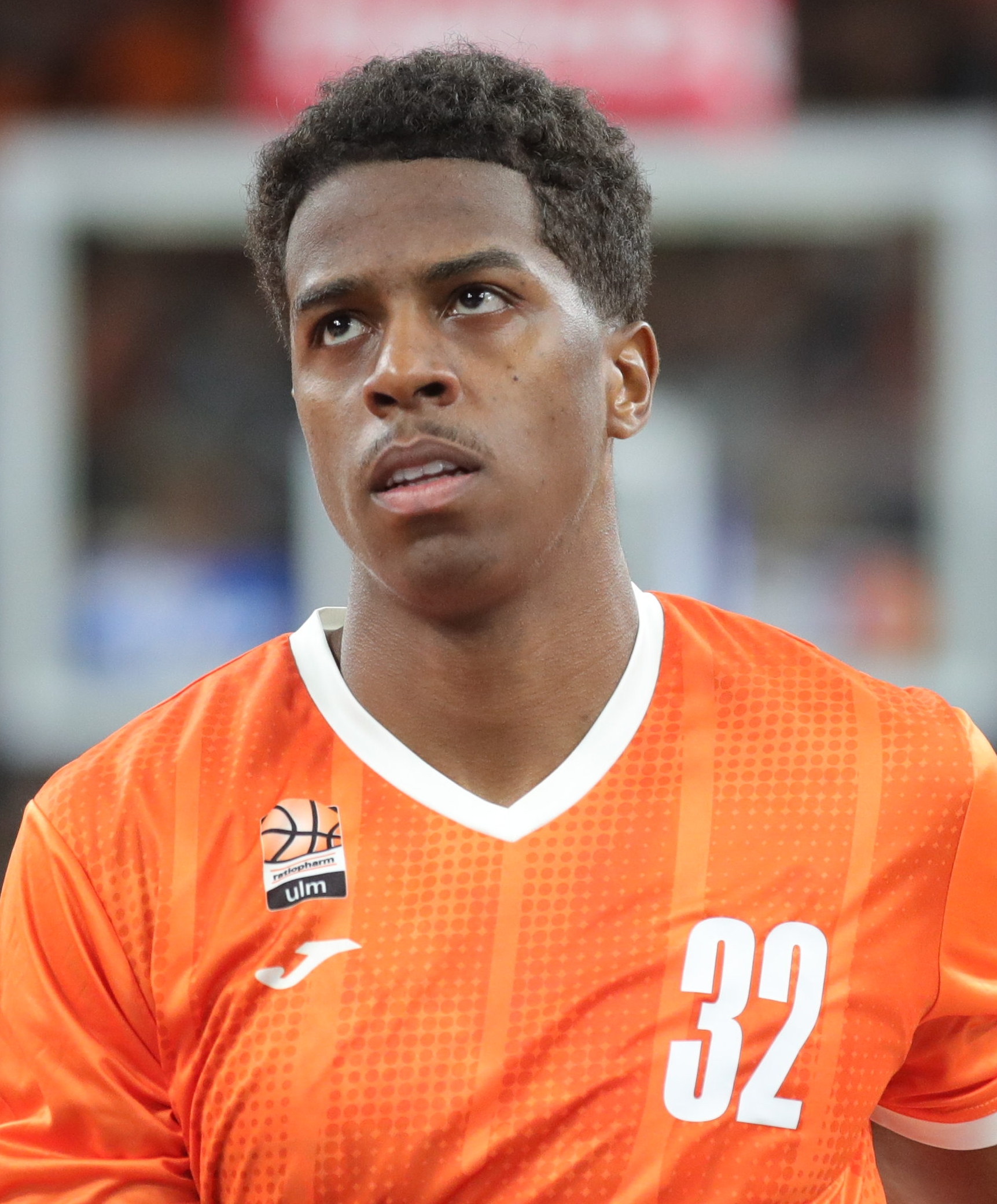
Georginho was on the inaugural All-Star Five selection in 2023

Season	Pos.	Player	Team	Ref.
2022–23	G	(Brazil) Alexey Borges	(Brazil) Minas	
2022–23	G	(Brazil) Georginho	(Brazil) Sesi Franca	
2022–23	F	(Argentina) Martín Cuello	(Brazil) Flamengo	
2022–23	**F**	**(Brazil) Lucas Mariano**	**(Brazil) Sesi Franca**	
2022–23	C	(Brazil) Lucas Dias	(Brazil) Sesi Franca	
2023–24	G	(Uruguay) Juan Brussino	(Uruguay) Hebraica Macabi	
2023–24	G	(Argentina) Franco Balbi	(Brazil) Flamengo	
2023–24	**F**	(United States) **Brandon Robinson**	(Argentina) **Quimsa**	
2023–24	F	(United States) Jordan Glynn	(Mexico) Halcones de Xalapa	
2023–24	C	(United States) Jordan Williams	(Uruguay) Hebraica Macabi	
2024–25	**G**	(Brazil) **Alexey Borges** (2)	(Brazil) **Flamengo**	
2024–25	G	(Uruguay) Nicola Pomoli	(Argentina) Instituto	
2024–25	F	(Brazil) Guilherme Deodato	(Brazil) Flamengo	
2024–25	F	(Argentina) Sebastián Vega	(Argentina) Boca Juniors	
2024–25	C	(Brazil) Lucas Dias (2)	(Brazil) Sesi Franca	
