= 2023–24 Basketball Champions League Americas =

5th season of the Basketball Champions League Americas

Basketball Champions League Americas
- Season: 2023–24
- Dates: 13 December 2023 – 14 April 2024
- Teams: 12

Regular season
- Season MVP: Brandon Robinson (Quimsa)

Finals
- Champions: (Argentina) Quimsa (2nd title)
- Runners-up: (Brazil) Flamengo
- Third place: (Mexico) Halcones de Xalapa
- Fourth place: (Uruguay) Hebraica Macabi

The 2023–24 Basketball Champions League Americas season, also referred to as the BCL Americas Season 5, was the 5th season of the Basketball Champions League Americas (BCLA). It was also the 25th season of Pan-American top-level competition, as well as the 62nd season of South American top-level competition.

The season began on 13 December 2023 and ended with the final stage in April 2024. The Final Four took place on 13 and 14 April 2024 at the Estadio Ciudad de Santiago del Estero in Santiago del Estero, Argentina. Final Four hosts Quimsa won their second BCL Americas title, defeating Flamengo 92–80 in the final.

Franca were the defending champions, having won their first league title and seventh pan-American title in history. They were eliminated by Hebraica Macabi in the quarterfinals.

== Team allocation ==
Nine out of twelve teams were announced on 9 August 2023 by FIBA. The three representative teams from Brazil were confirmed later, in 27 October 2023 by FIBA.

Gladiadores de Anzoátegui became the first Venezuelan team to participate in the league. The league did not feature a team from Canada, after having a representative from the Canadian Elite Basketball League (CEBL) the previous two seasons.

(Brazil) Franca (1st)	(Argentina) Quimsa (1st)	(Uruguay) Hebraica Macabi (1st)	(Nicaragua) Real Estelí (1st)
(Brazil) São Paulo (2nd)	(Argentina) Boca Juniors (2nd)	(Uruguay) Nacional (2nd)	(Mexico) Halcones de Xalapa (WC)
(Brazil) Flamengo (3rd)	(Argentina) Obras Sanitarias (WC)	(Chile) Universidad de Concepción (1st)	(Venezuela) Gladiadores de Anzoátegui (1st)

== Draw ==
The draw took place on 9 August 2023 in Miami. Group A was pre-determined based on geographical reasons and Groups B, C and D were decided through the draw.

== Group stage ==
=== Group A ===
Pos	Team	Pld	W	L	PF	PA	PD	Pts	Qualification
1	(Mexico) Halcones de Xalapa	6	4	2	533	477	+56	10	Advance to quarter-finals
2	(Nicaragua) Real Estelí	6	3	3	483	521	−38	9	Advance to quarter-finals
3	(Venezuela) Gladiadores de Anzoátegui	6	2	4	490	508	−18	8	

Source: FIBA
Rules for classification: 1) Points; 2) Head-to-head results; 3) Points difference; 4) Points scored.

16 December 2023	Real Estelí (Nicaragua)	80–70	(Mexico) Halcones de Xalapa	Managua, Nicaragua
	Scoring by quarter: 15–18, 22–15, 16–20, 27–17
		Boxscore		Arena: Polideportivo Alexis Argüello

17 December 2023	Halcones de Xalapa (Mexico)	76–82	(Venezuela) Gladiadores de Anzoátegui	Managua, Nicaragua
	Scoring by quarter: 17–22, 22–21, 15–18, 22–21
		Boxscore		Arena: Polideportivo Alexis Argüello

18 December 2023	Real Estelí (Nicaragua)	97–92(OT)	(Venezuela) Gladiadores de Anzoátegui	Managua, Nicaragua
	Scoring by quarter: 19–16, 29–26, 20–27, 18–17, Overtime: 11–6
		Boxscore		Arena: Polideportivo Alexis Argüello

20 January 2024	Gladiadores de Anzoátegui (Venezuela)	71–63	(Nicaragua) Real Estelí	Puerto La Cruz, Venezuela
	Scoring by quarter: 21–18, 16–16, 14–22, 20–7
		Boxscore		Arena: Gimnasio Luis Ramos

21 January 2024	Real Estelí (Nicaragua)	79–104	(Mexico) Halcones de Xalapa	Puerto La Cruz, Venezuela
	Scoring by quarter: 22–33, 21–25, 16–14, 20–32
		Boxscore		Arena: Gimnasio Luis Ramos

22 January 2024	Gladiadores de Anzoátegui (Venezuela)	74–92	(Mexico) Halcones de Xalapa	Puerto La Cruz, Venezuela
	Scoring by quarter: 27–24, 14–18, 15–29, 18–21
		Boxscore		Arena: Gimnasio Luis Ramos

7 February 2024	Halcones de Xalapa (Mexico)	91–87	(Venezuela) Gladiadores de Anzoátegui	Xalapa, Mexico
	Scoring by quarter: 32–18, 14–26, 19–27, 26–16
		Boxscore		Arena: Gimnasio USBI

8 February 2024	Gladiadores de Anzoátegui (Venezuela)	84–89	(Nicaragua) Real Estelí	Xalapa, Mexico
	Scoring by quarter: 14–25, 27–19, 19–22, 24–23
		Boxscore		Arena: Gimnasio USBI

9 February 2024	Halcones de Xalapa (Mexico)	100–75	(Nicaragua) Real Estelí	Xalapa, Mexico
	Scoring by quarter: 26–20, 23–25, 25–21, 26–9
		Boxscore		Arena: Gimnasio USBI

=== Group B ===
Pos	Team	Pld	W	L	PF	PA	PD	Pts	Qualification
1	(Argentina) Quimsa	6	3	3	522	480	+42	9 (Note: Head-to-head point difference: Quimsa +42, Nacional −18, São Paulo −24.)	Advance to quarter-finals
2	(Uruguay) Nacional	6	3	3	485	503	−18	9	Advance to quarter-finals
3	(Brazil) São Paulo	6	3	3	505	529	−24	9	

Source: FIBA
Rules for classification: 1) Points; 2) Head-to-head results; 3) Points difference; 4) Points scored.
Notes:

16 December 2023	Quimsa (Argentina)	112–65	(Brazil) São Paulo	Santiago del Estero, Argentina
	Scoring by quarter: 24–12, 24–24, 39–10, 25–19
		Boxscore		Arena: Estadio Ciudad

17 December 2023	São Paulo (Brazil)	84–89(OT)	(Uruguay) Nacional	Santiago del Estero, Argentina
	Scoring by quarter: 8–17, 23–26, 24–21, 21–12, Overtime: 8–13
		Boxscore		Arena: Estadio Ciudad

18 December 2023	Quimsa (Argentina)	86–78	(Uruguay) Nacional	Santiago del Estero, Argentina
	Scoring by quarter: 18–18, 13–24, 28–13, 27–23
		Boxscore		Arena: Estadio Ciudad

26 January 2024	Nacional (Uruguay)	78–86	(Argentina) Quimsa	Buenos Aires, Argentina
	Scoring by quarter: 19–23, 18–18, 20–25, 21–20
		Boxscore		Arena: Arena Obras Sanitarias

27 January 2024	Quimsa (Argentina)	84–87	(Brazil) São Paulo	Buenos Aires, Argentina
	Scoring by quarter: 22–20, 20–23, 22–23, 20–21
		Boxscore		Arena: Arena Obras Sanitarias

28 January 2024	Nacional (Uruguay)	86–82	(Brazil) São Paulo	Buenos Aires, Argentina
	Scoring by quarter: 22–24, 24–22, 20–17, 20–19
		Boxscore		Arena: Arena Obras Sanitarias

10 February 2024	São Paulo (Brazil)	93–87	(Uruguay) Nacional	São Paulo, Brazil
	Scoring by quarter: 15–9, 32–22, 24–21, 22–24
		Boxscore		Arena: Ginásio do Morumbi

11 February 2024	Nacional (Uruguay)	78–72	(Argentina) Quimsa	São Paulo, Brazil
	Scoring by quarter: 20–23, 18–20, 18–13, 22–16
		Boxscore		Arena: Ginásio do Morumbi

12 February 2024	São Paulo (Brazil)	94–82	(Argentina) Quimsa	São Paulo, Brazil
	Scoring by quarter: 23–15, 28–19, 15–21, 28–27
		Boxscore		Arena: Ginásio do Morumbi

=== Group C ===
Pos	Team	Pld	W	L	PF	PA	PD	Pts	Qualification
1	(Brazil) Flamengo	6	5	1	495	449	+46	11	Advance to quarter-finals
2	(Uruguay) Hebraica Macabi	6	2	4	455	496	−41	8 (Note: Head-to-head wins: Hebraica Macabi 2, Boca Juniors 1)	Advance to quarter-finals
3	(Argentina) Boca Juniors	6	2	4	436	441	−5	8	

Source: FIBA
Rules for classification: 1) Points; 2) Head-to-head results; 3) Points difference; 4) Points scored.
Notes:

13 December 2023	Flamengo (Brazil)	92–87(OT)	(Uruguay) Hebraica Macabi	Rio de Janeiro, Brazil
	Scoring by quarter: 25–22, 15–31, 28–16, 11–10, Overtime: 13–8
		Boxscore		Arena: Maracanãzinho

14 December 2023	Hebraica Macabi (Uruguay)	69–62	(Argentina) Boca Juniors	Rio de Janeiro, Brazil
	Scoring by quarter: 24–16, 12–11, 15–21, 19–14
		Boxscore		Arena: Maracanãzinho

15 December 2023	Flamengo (Brazil)	62–80	(Argentina) Boca Juniors	Rio de Janeiro, Brazil
	Scoring by quarter: 22–19, 18–19, 10–18, 12–24
		Boxscore		Arena: Maracanãzinho

17 January 2024	Hebraica Macabi (Uruguay)	82–64	(Argentina) Boca Juniors	Montevideo, Uruguay
	Scoring by quarter: 12–24, 24–16, 21–19, 25–5
		Boxscore		Arena: Palacio Peñarol

18 January 2024	Boca Juniors (Argentina)	62–65	(Brazil) Flamengo	Montevideo, Uruguay
	Scoring by quarter: 13–17, 15–19, 18–15, 16–14
		Boxscore		Arena: Palacio Peñarol

19 January 2024	Hebraica Macabi (Uruguay)	65–78	(Brazil) Flamengo	Montevideo, Uruguay
	Scoring by quarter: 20–17, 16–19, 10–22, 19–20
		Boxscore		Arena: Palacio Peñarol

10 February 2024	Boca Juniors (Argentina)	79–87	(Brazil) Flamengo	Buenos Aires, Argentina
	Scoring by quarter: 20–21, 18–20, 15–20, 26–26
		Boxscore		Arena: La Bombonerita

11 February 2024	Flamengo (Brazil)	111–76	(Uruguay) Hebraica Macabi	Buenos Aires, Argentina
	Scoring by quarter: 31–22, 22–12, 23–24, 35–18
		Boxscore		Arena: La Bombonerita

12 February 2024	Boca Juniors (Argentina)	89–76	(Uruguay) Hebraica Macabi	Buenos Aires, Argentina
	Scoring by quarter: 26–23, 14–23, 26–19, 23–11
		Boxscore		Arena: La Bombonerita

=== Group D ===
Pos	Team	Pld	W	L	PF	PA	PD	Pts	Qualification
1	(Brazil) Sesi Franca	6	5	1	583	496	+87	11	Advance to quarter-finals
2	(Argentina) Obras Basket	6	4	2	546	515	+31	10	Advance to quarter-finals
3	(Chile) Universidad de Concepción	6	0	6	425	543	−118	6	

Source: FIBA
Rules for classification: 1) Points; 2) Head-to-head results; 3) Points difference; 4) Points scored.

13 December 2023	Sesi Franca (Brazil)	78–59	(Chile) Universidad de Concepción	Franca, Brazil
	Scoring by quarter: 23–12, 22–9, 17–20, 16–18
		Boxscore		Arena: Ginásio Pedrocão

14 December 2023	Universidad de Concepción (Chile)	75–93	(Argentina) Obras Basket	Franca, Brazil
	Scoring by quarter: 15-23, 20-26, 20-14, 20-30
		Boxscore		Arena: Ginásio Pedrocão

15 December 2023	Sesi Franca (Brazil)	94–87	(Argentina) Obras Basket	Franca, Brazil
	Scoring by quarter: 25–20, 18-21, 34-17, 17–29
		Boxscore		Arena: Ginásio Pedrocão

20 January 2024	Universidad de Concepción (Chile)	67–96	(Argentina) Obras Basket	Concepción, Chile
	Scoring by quarter: 11–22, 22–30, 16–24, 18–20
		Boxscore		Arena: Casa del Deporte

21 January 2024	Obras Basket (Argentina)	94–118	(Brazil) Sesi Franca	Concepción, Chile
	Scoring by quarter: 26–29, 20–34, 23–21, 25–34
		Boxscore		Arena: Casa del Deporte

22 January 2024	Universidad de Concepción (Chile)	87–109	(Brazil) Sesi Franca	Concepción, Chile
	Scoring by quarter: 26–30, 17–37, 23–18, 21–24
		Boxscore		Arena: Casa del Deporte

7 February 2024	Obras Basket (Argentina)	97–96(OT)	(Brazil) Sesi Franca	Buenos Aires, Argentina
	Scoring by quarter: 21–29, 17–18, 25–22, 25–19, Overtime: 9–8
		Boxscore		Arena: Arena Obras Sanitarias

8 February 2024	Sesi Franca (Brazil)	88–72	(Chile) Universidad de Concepción	Buenos Aires, Argentina
	Scoring by quarter: 22–22, 26–22, 23–14, 17–14
		Boxscore		Arena: Arena Obras Sanitarias

9 February 2024	Obras Basket (Argentina)	79–65	(Chile) Universidad de Concepción	Buenos Aires, Argentina
	Scoring by quarter: 26–15, 11–19, 11–11, 31–20
		Boxscore		Arena: Arena Obras Sanitarias

== Quarterfinals ==
The quarterfinals took place in March 2024. The four winners advanced to the Final Four. Teams listed as "Team 1" hosted games 2 and 3. The schedule was confirmed on 16 February 2024.

Team 1	Series	Team 2	Game 1	Game 2	Game 3
Halcones de Xalapa (Mexico)	2–1	(Uruguay) Nacional	78–79	105–104 (2OT)	88–75
Quimsa (Argentina)	2–1	(Nicaragua) Real Estelí	98–68	94–95	99–69
Flamengo (Brazil)	2–0	(Argentina) Obras Basket	113–80	80–67	—
Sesi Franca (Brazil)	1–2	(Uruguay) Hebraica Macabi	96–67	94–100	96–101

=== Halcones de Xalapa vs. Nacional ===
5 March 2024 Game 1	Nacional (Uruguay)	79–78 (Series: 1–0)	(Mexico) Halcones de Xalapa	Montevideo, Uruguay
21:40	Scoring by quarter: 26–23, 17–22, 12–14, 24–19
	Pts: Semiglia 20; Rebs: Anderson 15; Asts: Acosta 5	Boxscore	Pts: Bejarano 19; Rebs: Mahalbašić 8 Asts: Mahalbašić 8	Arena: Antel Arena; Referees: Leonardo Zalazar (ARG), Daniel García (VEN), Alan dos Santos (BRA)

9 March 2024 Game 2	Halcones de Xalapa (Mexico)	105–104(2OT) (Series: 1–1)	(Uruguay) Nacional	Xalapa, Mexico
19:10	Scoring by quarter: 21–17, 25–21, 22–27, 19–22, Overtime: 10–10, 8–7
	Pts: Fernández 28; Rebs: Mahalbašić 8 Asts: Stoll 12	Boxscore	Pts: Mathews 21; Rebs: Anderson 12; Asts: Semiglia 8	Arena: Gimnasio USBI; Referees: Roberto Vázquez (PUR), Julio Anaya (PAN), Carmelo de la Rosa (PUR)

10 March 2024 Game 3	Halcones de Xalapa (Mexico)	88–75 (Series: 2–1)	(Uruguay) Nacional	Xalapa, Mexico
20:10	Scoring by quarter: 23–20, 19–14, 17–16, 29–25
	Pts: Glynn 23; Rebs: Glynn 9 Asts: Cubillán, Stoll 5	Boxscore	Pts: Mathews 24; Rebs: Giorgetti 8 Asts: Acosta, Anderson 4	Arena: Gimnasio USBI; Referees: Roberto Vázquez (PUR), Julio Anaya (PAN), Carlos Peralta (ECU)

=== Quimsa vs. Real Estelí ===
6 March 2024 Game 1	Real Estelí (Nicaragua)	68–98 (Series: 0–1)	(Argentina) Quimsa	Managua, Nicaragua
19:10	Scoring by quarter: 20–20, 19–22, 20–34, 9–22
	Pts: Williams 17; Rebs: Williams 9 Asts: Holloway 6	Boxscore	Pts: Acevedo 15; Rebs: Basabe, Vasirani 10; Asts: Brussino, Robinson 5	Arena: Polideportivo Alexis Argüello; Referees: Julio Anaya (PAN), Carmelo de la Rosa (PUR), José Fernández (CRC)

10 March 2024 Game 2	Quimsa (Argentina)	94–95 (Series: 1–1)	(Nicaragua) Real Estelí	Santiago del Estero, Argentina
20:40	Scoring by quarter: 24–25, 26–26, 20–22, 24–22
	Pts: Robinson 27; Rebs: Ramírez 9 Asts: Sansimoni 6	Boxscore	Pts: Romero 27; Rebs: Romero 12; Asts: Ruiz 9	Arena: Estadio Ciudad de Santiago del Estero; Referees: Andrés Bartel (URU), Daniel García (VEN), Alan dos Santos (BRA)

11 March 2024 Game 3	Quimsa (Argentina)	99–69 (Series: 2–1)	(Nicaragua) Real Estelí	Santiago del Estero, Argentina
22:10	Scoring by quarter: 28–21, 23–25, 21–11, 27–12
	Pts: Robinson 22; Rebs: Robinson, Vasirani 7 Asts: Brussino 6	Boxscore	Pts: Romero 16; Rebs: Bishop 7 Asts: Holloway, Lucas 3	Arena: Estadio Ciudad de Santiago del Estero; Referees: Andrés Bartel (URU), Daniel García (VEN), Fernando Leite (BRA)

=== Flamengo vs. Obras Basket ===
4 March 2024 Game 1	Obras Basket (Argentina)	80–113 (Series: 0–1)	(Brazil) Flamengo	Buenos Aires, Argentina
19:10	Scoring by quarter: 22–37, 17–25, 27–30, 14–21
	Pts: Spight 20; Rebs: Ruiz 6 Asts: Barral 5	Boxscore	Pts: Manfio 28; Rebs: Galvanini 12; Asts: Balbi 9	Arena: Arena Obras Sanitarias; Referees: Andrés Bartel (URU), Krishna Domínguez (MEX), Nicolás Flores (PAR)

7 March 2024 Game 2	Flamengo (Brazil)	80–67 (Series: 2–0)	(Argentina) Obras Basket	Rio de Janeiro, Brazil
20:10	Scoring by quarter: 22–18, 19–19, 27–17, 12–13
	Pts: Galvanini 24; Rebs: Manfio 8 Asts: Balbi 6	Boxscore	Pts: Spight 25; Rebs: Tha Andela 9 Asts: Spight, Venegas 3	Arena: Ginásio do Maracanãzinho; Referees: Johnny Batista (PUR), Kristian Páez (ECU), Samuel Hidalgo (DOM)

=== Sesi Franca vs. Hebraica Macabi ===
5 March 2024 Game 1	Hebraica Macabi (Uruguay)	67–96 (Series: 0–1)	(Brazil) Sesi Franca	Montevideo, Uruguay
19:10	Scoring by quarter: 14–24, 17–28, 18–19, 18–25
	Pts: Hassell 16; Rebs: Hassell 9 Asts: Parodi 6	Boxscore	Pts: Dias 19; Rebs: Santos 8 Asts: three players 5	Arena: Antel Arena; Referees: Juan Fernández (ARG), Johnny Batista (PUR), Carlos Vélez (COL)

8 March 2024 Game 2	Sesi Franca (Brazil)	94–100 (Series: 1–1)	(Uruguay) Hebraica Macabi	Franca, Brazil
18:40	Scoring by quarter: 24–28, 23–27, 25–24, 22–21
	Pts: Jackson 24; Rebs: Ferreira 7 Asts: Scala 7	Boxscore	Pts: Hassell 25; Rebs: Hassell 11; Asts: Parodi 8	Arena: Ginásio Pedrocão; Referees: Leonardo Zalazar (ARG), Krishna Domínguez (MEX), Franco Ronconi (ARG)

9 March 2024 Game 3	Sesi Franca (Brazil)	96–101 (Series: 1–2)	(Uruguay) Hebraica Macabi	Franca, Brazil
18:40	Scoring by quarter: 31–32, 18–15, 27–25, 20–29
	Pts: Hinkle 23; Rebs: Santos 7 Asts: Scala 8	Boxscore	Pts: Parodi 26; Rebs: Hassell 11; Asts: Parodi 10	Arena: Ginásio Pedrocão; Referees: Leonardo Zalazar (ARG), Krishna Domínguez (MEX), Alexis Mercado (PUR)

== Final Four ==
The Final Four took place on 13 and 14 April 2024. On 19 March, FIBA announced the round will be hosted by Quimsa at the Estadio Ciudad de Santiago del Estero in Santiago del Estero, Argentina.

=== Bracket ===
Semifinals
13 April
(Mexico) Halcones de Xalapa	87
(Brazil) Flamengo	90
13 April
(Argentina) Quimsa	89
(Uruguay) Hebraica Macabi	75

Final
14 April
(Brazil) Flamengo	80
(Argentina) Quimsa	92
Third place game
14 April
(Mexico) Halcones de Xalapa (OT)	101
(Uruguay) Hebraica Macabi	99

=== Semifinals ===
13 April 2024	Halcones de Xalapa (Mexico)	87–90	(Brazil) Flamengo	Santiago del Estero, Argentina
19:10	Scoring by quarter: 11–21, 19–26, 29–12, 28–31
	Pts: Glynn 26; Rebs: Glynn 9 Asts: Stoll 10	Boxscore	Pts: Deodato 25; Rebs: Galvanini 12; Asts: Balbi 7	Arena: Estadio Ciudad de Santiago del Estero; Referees: Julio Anaya (PAN), Andrés Bartel (URU), Juan Fernández (ARG)

13 April 2024	Quimsa (Argentina)	89–75	(Uruguay) Hebraica Macabi	Santiago del Estero, Argentina
22:10	Scoring by quarter: 19–24, 20–10, 26–16, 24–25
	Pts: Basabe, Brussino 14; Rebs: Vasirani 8 Asts: Sansimoni 6	Boxscore	Pts: Williams 25; Rebs: Hassell, Oglivie 8 Asts: Parodi 6	Arena: Estadio Ciudad de Santiago del Estero; Referees: Roberto Vázquez (PUR), Daniel García (VEN), Kristian Páez (ECU)

=== Third place game ===
14 April 2024	Halcones de Xalapa (Mexico)	101–99(OT)	(Uruguay) Hebraica Macabi	Santiago del Estero, Argentina
18:40	Scoring by quarter: 23–25, 16–25, 26–17, 26–24, Overtime: 10–8
	Pts: Bejarano, Glynn 20; Rebs: Mahalbašić 9 Asts: Stoll 10	Boxscore	Pts: Williams 32; Rebs: Oglivie 12; Asts: Hassell 4	Arena: Estadio Ciudad de Santiago del Estero; Referees: Roberto Vázquez (PUR), Carlos Peralta (ECU), Kristian Páez (ECU)

=== Final ===
14 April 2024	Flamengo (Brazil)	80–92	(Argentina) Quimsa	Santiago del Estero, Argentina
22:10	Scoring by quarter: 12–28, 21–22, 26–20, 21–22
	Pts: Balbi 16; Rebs: Galvanini 7 Asts: Machado 4	Boxscore	Pts: Robinson 23; Rebs: Basabe 14; Asts: Brussino 7	Arena: Estadio Ciudad de Santiago del Estero; Referees: Julio Anaya (PAN), Andrés Bartel (URU), Johnny Batista (PUR)
