= 2024–25 Basketball Champions League Americas =

6th season of the Basketball Champions League Americas

Basketball Champions League Americas
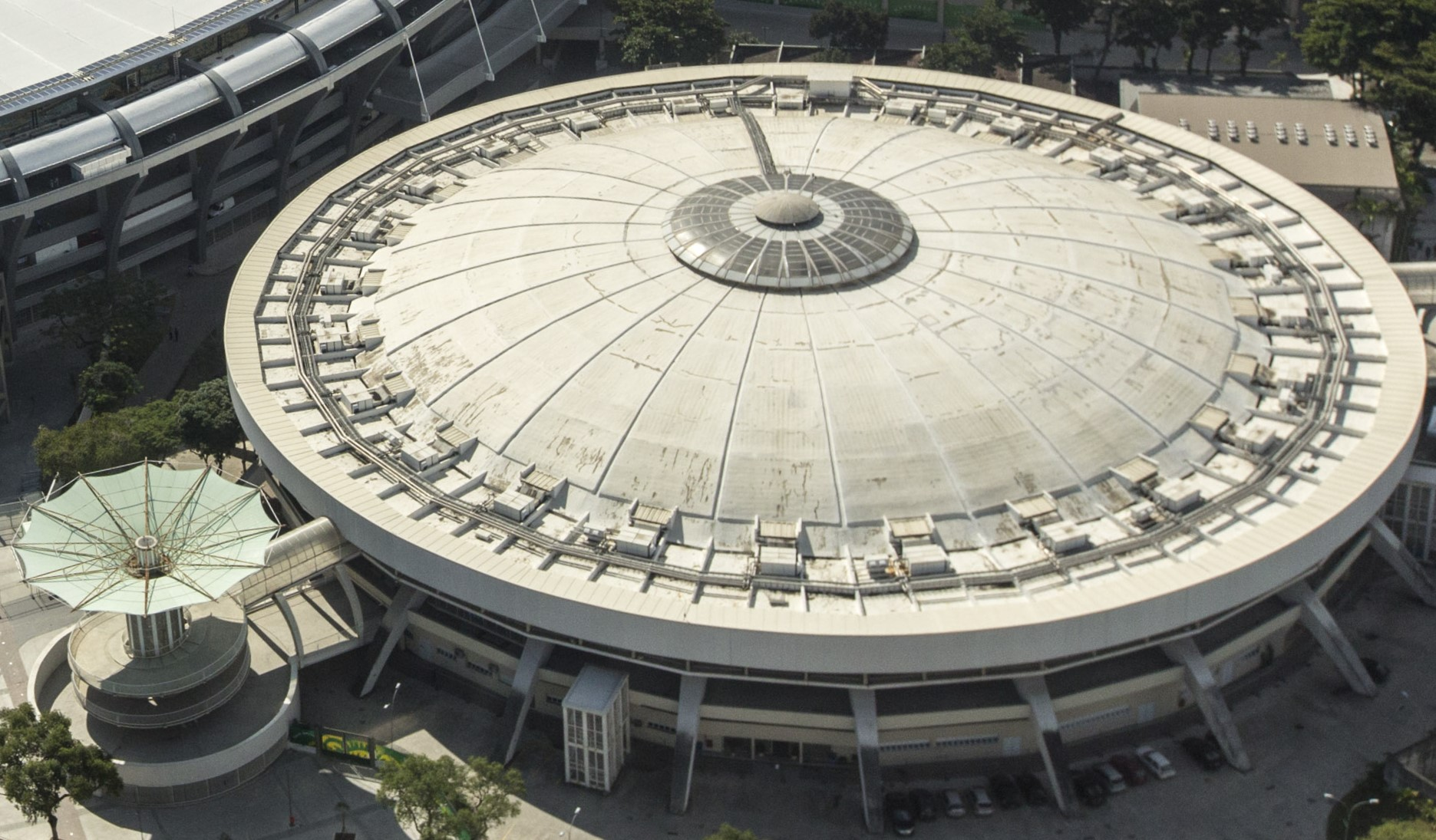
- The Ginásio do Maracanãzinho hosted the Final Four
- Season: 2024–25
- Dates: 12 December 2024 – 19 April 2025
- Teams: 12

Finals
- Champions: (Brazil) Flamengo; 2nd league title 3rd continental title
- Runners-up: (Argentina) Boca Juniors
- Third place: (Brazil) Sesi Franca
- Fourth place: (Argentina) Instituto

Awards
- Season MVP: (Brazil) Alexey Borges (Flamengo)

The 2024–25 Basketball Champions League Americas season, also referred to as the BCL Americas Season 6, was the 6th season of the Basketball Champions League Americas (BCLA). It was also the 26th season of Pan-American top-level competition, as well as the 63rd season of South American top-level competition.

The season began on 12 December 2024 and ended on 19 April 2025. The Final Four was held on 18 and 19 April 2025 at the Ginásio do Maracanãzinho in Rio de Janeiro, Brazil.

Quimsa were the defending champions, but they were eliminated by Sesi Franca in the quarterfinals. Final Four hosts Flamengo won their second BCL Americas championship (their third continental title), after beating Boca Juniors in the final. As winners, Flamengo qualified for the 2025 FIBA Intercontinental Cup.

== Team allocation ==
The twelve teams were announced on 20 November 2024 by FIBA.

Location of teams of the 2024–25 BCL Americas group stage.
Red: Group A; Green: Group B; Yellow: Group C; Blue: Group D.

(Brazil) Sesi Franca (1st)	(Argentina) Boca Juniors (1st)	(Colombia) Toros del Valle (2nd)	(Nicaragua) Real Estelí (1st)
(Brazil) Flamengo (2nd)	(Argentina) Instituto (2nd)	(Colombia) Paisas (WC)	(Panama) Toros de Chiriquí (1st)
(Brazil) KTO Minas (3rd)	(Argentina) Quimsa (3rd)	(Chile) Colegio Los Leones (1st)	(Uruguay) Biguá (WC)

Notes

1. Uruguay (URU): Although Aguada and Peñarol qualified as champions and runners-up of the 2023–24 LUB season, both refused to participate in the tournament. Biguá took one of the vacant spots, as a guest.

== The Draw ==
The draw took place on 20 November 2024 in Miami, United States at 16:00 ET. Group A was pre-determined based on geographical reasons and Groups B, C and D were decided through the draw.

Group stage draw
Pot 1	Pot 2	Pot 3
(Argentina) Quimsa; (Argentina) Instituto; (Brazil) Flamengo	(Argentina) Boca Juniors; (Brazil) Sesi Franca; (Brazil) KTO Minas	(Chile) Los Leones de Quilpué; (Panama) Toros de Chiriquí; (Uruguay) Biguá

== Group stage ==
=== Group A ===
Pos	Team	Pld	W	L	PF	PA	PD	Pts	Qualification
1	(Nicaragua) Real Estelí	6	4	2	515	489	+26	10	Advance to quarter-finals
2	(Colombia) Paisas	6	3	3	526	547	−21	9	Advance to quarter-finals
3	(Colombia) Toros del Valle	6	2	4	507	512	−5	8	

Source: FIBA
Rules for classification: 1) Points; 2) Head-to-head results; 3) Points difference; 4) Points scored.

16 January 2025	Real Estelí (Nicaragua)	87–68	(Colombia) Toros del Valle	Managua, Nicaragua
19:40	Scoring by quarter: 29–9, 26–27, 18–16, 14–16
	Pts: De Jesús 20; Rebs: Campbell 11; Asts: Ruiz 5	Boxscore	Pts: Ayarza, De Luque 15; Rebs: De Luque 12; Asts: Pizarro 9	Arena: Polideportivo Alexis Argüello; Attendance: 5,100; Referees: Omar Bermúdez (MEX), Leonardo Zalazar (ARG), Nicolas Zivieri (BRA)

17 January 2025	Toros del Valle (Colombia)	102–68	(Colombia) Paisas	Managua, Nicaragua
19:40	Scoring by quarter: 28–18, 23–17, 28–16, 23–17
	Pts: Wright 22; Rebs: De Luque, Wright 9 Asts: Pizarro 5	Boxscore	Pts: Crawford 13; Rebs: Vargas 10; Asts: three players 3	Arena: Polideportivo Alexis Argüello; Attendance: 200; Referees: Omar Bermúdez (MEX), Alan dos Santos (BRA), Nicolas Zivieri (BRA)

18 January 2025	Real Estelí (Nicaragua)	79–70	(Colombia) Paisas	Managua, Nicaragua
19:40	Scoring by quarter: 20–17, 22–12, 19–20, 18–21
	Pts: Girón 20; Rebs: Ruiz 8 Asts: De Jesús 5	Boxscore	Pts: Cosey 20; Rebs: Vargas 17; Asts: Cosey 5	Arena: Polideportivo Alexis Argüello; Attendance: 5,500; Referees: Omar Bermúdez (MEX), Leonardo Zalazar (ARG), Alan dos Santos (BRA)

31 January 2025	Toros del Valle (Colombia)	87–99	(Colombia) Paisas	Cali, Colombia
19:40	Scoring by quarter: 24–29, 18–15, 21–27, 24–28
	Pts: Santiago 24; Rebs: Trocha 8 Asts: De Luque 4	Boxscore	Pts: Liz 34; Rebs: Vargas 14; Asts: Cosey 5	Arena: Coliseo Evangelista Mora; Referees: Juan Fernández (ARG), Andrés Bartel (URU), Fernando Leite (BRA)

1 February 2025	Paisas (Colombia)	101–100	(Nicaragua) Real Estelí	Cali, Colombia
19:40	Scoring by quarter: 30–29, 31–28, 24–28, 16–15
	Pts: Liz 34; Rebs: Griffin 11; Asts: Cosey 5	Boxscore	Pts: De Jesús 35; Rebs: Ruiz 4 Asts: De Jesús 5	Arena: Coliseo Evangelista Mora; Referees: Leonardo Zalazar (ARG), Andrés Bartel (URU), Nicolás Flores (PAR)

2 February 2025	Toros del Valle (Colombia)	82–72	(Nicaragua) Real Estelí	Cali, Colombia
18:10	Scoring by quarter: 32–13, 17–20, 13–17, 20–22
	Pts: Almanza 17; Rebs: Almanza 13; Asts: Pizarro 10	Boxscore	Pts: Ruiz 20; Rebs: Girón 5 Asts: Girón 5	Arena: Coliseo Evangelista Mora; Referees: Juan Fernández (ARG), Leonardo Zalazar (ARG), Fernando Leite (BRA)

5 February 2025	Paisas (Colombia)	87–92	(Nicaragua) Real Estelí	Medellín, Colombia
19:40	Scoring by quarter: 12–20, 23–23, 23–27, 29–22
	Pts: Liz 20; Rebs: Rosario 8 Asts: Cosey 6	Boxscore	Pts: De Jesús 32; Rebs: De Jesús, Ruiz 6 Asts: Girón 5	Arena: Coliseo Iván de Bedout; Attendance: 1,704; Referees: Roberto Vázquez (PUR), Ryan Johnson (USA), Julirys Guzmán (PUR)

6 February 2025	Real Estelí (Nicaragua)	85–81	(Colombia) Toros del Valle	Medellín, Colombia
19:40	Scoring by quarter: 10–18, 20–20, 29–21, 26–22
	Pts: De Jesús 25; Rebs: Ruiz 12; Asts: Girón, Ruiz 5	Boxscore	Pts: Wright 22; Rebs: Trocha 9 Asts: Pizarro 7	Arena: Coliseo Iván de Bedout; Attendance: 494; Referees: Leonardo Zalazar (ARG), Ryan Johnson (USA), Julirys Guzmán (PUR)

7 February 2025	Paisas (Colombia)	101–87	(Colombia) Toros del Valle	Medellín, Colombia
19:40	Scoring by quarter: 21–23, 31–21, 24–24, 25–19
	Pts: Cosey 30; Rebs: Rosario 12; Asts: Cosey 4	Boxscore	Pts: Ayarza 19; Rebs: De Luque, Trocha 6 Asts: Pizarro 5	Arena: Coliseo Iván de Bedout; Attendance: 1,802; Referees: Roberto Vázquez (PUR), Leonardo Zalazar (ARG), Carlos Vélez (COL)

=== Group B ===
Pos	Team	Pld	W	L	PF	PA	PD	Pts	Qualification
1	(Brazil) Flamengo	6	5	1	542	413	+129	11	Advance to quarter-finals
2	(Argentina) Boca Juniors	6	4	2	515	441	+74	10	Advance to quarter-finals
3	(Panama) Toros de Chiriquí	6	0	6	391	594	−203	6	

Source: FIBA
Rules for classification: 1) Points; 2) Head-to-head results; 3) Points difference; 4) Points scored.

15 December 2024	Flamengo (Brazil)	70–69	(Argentina) Boca Juniors	Rio de Janeiro, Brazil
19:40	Scoring by quarter: 20–22, 13–13, 21–15, 16–19
	Pts: Deodato, Johnson 16; Rebs: Siewert, Williams 7 Asts: Balbi, Borges 5	Boxscore	Pts: Ibargüen 20; Rebs: Vega 8 Asts: Scala 6	Arena: Ginásio Álvaro Vieira Lima; Referees: Johnny Batista (PUR), Krishna Domínguez (MEX), Jayson Stiell (CAN)

16 December 2024	Boca Juniors (Argentina)	92–71	(Panama) Toros de Chiriquí	Rio de Janeiro, Brazil
19:40	Scoring by quarter: 22–22, 33–14, 18–23, 19–12
	Pts: Ibargüen 18; Rebs: Piñero, Vega 6 Asts: Vildoza 8	Boxscore	Pts: Foster 20; Rebs: Bell 9 Asts: Navarro 4	Arena: Ginásio Álvaro Vieira Lima; Referees: Johnny Batista (PUR), Alan dos Santos (BRA), Edwin Quiles (PUR)

17 December 2024	Flamengo (Brazil)	99–72	(Panama) Toros de Chiriquí	Rio de Janeiro, Brazil
19:40	Scoring by quarter: 23–12, 18–17, 34–17, 24–25
	Pts: Williams 16; Rebs: Siewert 10; Asts: Borges 9	Boxscore	Pts: Rojas 18; Rebs: Navarro 5 Asts: Foster 9	Arena: Ginásio Álvaro Vieira Lima; Referees: Johnny Batista (PUR), Krishna Domínguez (MEX), Edwin Quiles (PUR)

12 January 2025	Toros de Chiriquí (Panama)	50–96	(Brazil) Flamengo	Panama City, Panama
20:40	Scoring by quarter: 12–18, 14–30, 18–26, 6–22
	Pts: Hicks 14; Rebs: Lloreda 7 Asts: Armstrong, Navarro 3	Boxscore	Pts: Deodato, Johnson 13; Rebs: Miranda 8 Asts: Borges 9	Arena: Roberto Durán Arena; Referees: Andrés Bartel (URU), Blanca Burns (USA), Julirys Guzmán (PUR)

13 January 2025	Flamengo (Brazil)	96–61	(Argentina) Boca Juniors	Panama City, Panama
20:40	Scoring by quarter: 27–21, 30–14, 20–12, 19–14
	Pts: Johnson 22; Rebs: Balbi 9 Asts: Borges 6	Boxscore	Pts: Cooper 13; Rebs: three players 3 Asts: Scala, Vega 3	Arena: Roberto Durán Arena; Attendance: 972; Referees: Andrés Bartel (URU), Krishna Domínguez (MEX), Orlando Varela (HON)

14 January 2025	Toros de Chiriquí (Panama)	63–83	(Argentina) Boca Juniors	Panama City, Panama
20:40	Scoring by quarter: 17–22, 14–24, 18–16, 14–21
	Pts: Hicks 19; Rebs: Navarro 8 Asts: Armstrong 6	Boxscore	Pts: Cuello, Vildoza 15; Rebs: Cuello 9 Asts: three players 3	Arena: Roberto Durán Arena; Attendance: 657; Referees: Krishna Domínguez (MEX), Michael Scott (CAN), Julirys Guzmán (PUR)

9 February 2025	Boca Juniors (Argentina)	96–71	(Brazil) Flamengo	Buenos Aires, Argentina
11:10	Scoring by quarter: 24–17, 32–15, 28–12, 12–27
	Pts: Giorgetti, Vildoza 15; Rebs: Giorgetti 5 Asts: Scala 8	Boxscore	Pts: Deodato 22; Rebs: Dos Santos 9 Asts: Balbi 4	Arena: Gimnasio Héctor Etchart; Referees: Omar Bermúdez (MEX), Daniel García (VEN), Carmelo de la Rosa (PUR)

10 February 2025	Flamengo (Brazil)	110–65	(Panama) Toros de Chiriquí	Buenos Aires, Argentina
21:20	Scoring by quarter: 29–19, 26–17, 32–13, 23–16
	Pts: Williams 19; Rebs: Williams 8 Asts: Balbi 11	Boxscore	Pts: Murillo, Navarro 11; Rebs: Lloreda 5 Asts: Armstrong 5	Arena: Gimnasio Héctor Etchart; Referees: Carmelo de la Rosa (PUR), Yezid Carreño (COL), Franco Anselmo (ARG)

11 February 2025	Boca Juniors (Argentina)	114–70	(Panama) Toros de Chiriquí	Buenos Aires, Argentina
21:20	Scoring by quarter: 30–13, 21–21, 33–16, 30–20
	Pts: Cooper 16; Rebs: Guerrero, Ibargüen 6 Asts: Guerrero 9	Boxscore	Pts: Hicks 18; Rebs: Lloreda 8 Asts: Armstrong 5	Arena: Gimnasio Héctor Etchart; Referees: Omar Bermúdez (MEX), Daniel García (VEN), Yezid Carreño (COL)

=== Group C ===
Pos	Team	Pld	W	L	PF	PA	PD	Pts	Qualification
1	(Brazil) KTO Minas	6	6	0	489	420	+69	12	Advance to quarter-finals
2	(Argentina) Quimsa	6	2	4	430	459	−29	8	Advance to quarter-finals
3	(Uruguay) Biguá	6	1	5	423	463	−40	7	

Source: FIBA
Rules for classification: 1) Points; 2) Head-to-head results; 3) Points difference; 4) Points scored.

12 December 2024	Quimsa (Argentina)	70–72	(Uruguay) Biguá	Santiago del Estero, Argentina
22:10	Scoring by quarter: 18–23, 11–13, 14–13, 27–23
	Pts: Pérez 19; Rebs: Miller 15; Asts: Brussino, Sansimoni 4	Boxscore	Pts: Espinosa 16; Rebs: Cunningham 10; Asts: Spight 8	Arena: Estadio Ciudad; Attendance: 100; Referees: Grant Todey (USA), Carlos Vélez (COL), Nicolás Flores (PAR)

13 December 2024	Biguá (Uruguay)	60–73	(Brazil) KTO Minas	Santiago del Estero, Argentina
22:10	Scoring by quarter: 18–17, 9–20, 16–22, 17–14
	Pts: Cerminato 12; Rebs: Payovich 6 Asts: three players 3	Boxscore	Pts: Montero 17; Rebs: Paranhos 10; Asts: Machado 4	Arena: Estadio Ciudad; Attendance: 50; Referees: Juan Fernández (ARG), Nicolás Flores (PAR), Orlando Varela (HON)

14 December 2024	Quimsa (Argentina)	73–84	(Brazil) KTO Minas	Santiago del Estero, Argentina
22:40	Scoring by quarter: 31–21, 14–18, 17–20, 11–25
	Pts: Pérez 20; Rebs: Miller 7 Asts: Brussino 8	Boxscore	Pts: Fuzaro 17; Rebs: Mineiro, Montero 7 Asts: Fuzaro, Machado 4	Arena: Estadio Ciudad; Attendance: 50; Referees: Carlos Vélez (COL), Grant Todey (USA), Orlando Varela (HON)

12 January 2025	Biguá (Uruguay)	77–85	(Brazil) KTO Minas	Paysandú, Uruguay
20:10	Scoring by quarter: 11–25, 21–23, 16–17, 29–20
	Pts: Cerminato, Spight 13; Rebs: Cerminato, Payovich 6 Asts: Espinosa 5	Boxscore	Pts: Fuzaro 18; Rebs: Montero 14; Asts: four players 3	Arena: Estadio 8 de Junio; Referees: Johnny Batista (PUR), Daniel García (VEN), Carmelo de la Rosa (PUR)

13 January 2025	KTO Minas (Brazil)	80–69	(Argentina) Quimsa	Paysandú, Uruguay
20:10	Scoring by quarter: 21–21, 19–16, 28–20, 12–12
	Pts: Baralle, Montero 16; Rebs: Montero 10; Asts: Machado 5	Boxscore	Pts: Pérez 22; Rebs: Louis 10; Asts: seven players 2	Arena: Estadio 8 de Junio; Attendance: 546; Referees: Johnny Batista (PUR), Daniel García (VEN), Yezid Carreño (COL)

14 January 2025	Biguá (Uruguay)	66–79	(Argentina) Quimsa	Paysandú, Uruguay
20:10	Scoring by quarter: 12–20, 24–23, 17–9, 13–27
	Pts: Spight 21; Rebs: Cunningham 7 Asts: Espinosa, Spight 3	Boxscore	Pts: Romano 18; Rebs: Miller 6 Asts: Brussino 6	Arena: Estadio 8 de Junio; Attendance: 552; Referees: Johnny Batista (PUR), Fernando Leite (BRA), Carmelo de la Rosa (PUR)

8 February 2025	KTO Minas (Brazil)	86–64	(Argentina) Quimsa	Belo Horizonte, Brazil
19:10	Scoring by quarter: 27–20, 21–10, 18–19, 20–15
	Pts: Silva 15; Rebs: Mineiro, Paranhos 6 Asts: Baralle 6	Boxscore	Pts: Ali 16; Rebs: Louis 7 Asts: Brussino 5	Arena: Arena Minas Tênis Clube; Referees: Jorge Vásquez (PUR), Krishna Domínguez (MEX), Roberto Fernández (CRC)

9 February 2025	Quimsa (Argentina)	75–71	(Uruguay) Biguá	Belo Horizonte, Brazil
19:10	Scoring by quarter: 14–18, 22–10, 15–20, 24–23
	Pts: Brussino 13; Rebs: Ali, Miller 7 Asts: Romano 3	Boxscore	Pts: Spight 23; Rebs: Cerminato 13; Asts: Cerminato, Spight 4	Arena: Arena Minas Tênis Clube; Referees: Jorge Vásquez (PUR), Alan dos Santos (BRA), Samuel Hidalgo (DOM)

10 February 2025	KTO Minas (Brazil)	81–77	(Uruguay) Biguá	Belo Horizonte, Brazil
19:10	Scoring by quarter: 22–19, 19–20, 20–21, 20–17
	Pts: Elias 21; Rebs: Paranhos 11; Asts: Baralle 5	Boxscore	Pts: Pastor 16; Rebs: Payovich 10; Asts: Rodríguez 4	Arena: Arena Minas Tênis Clube; Referees: Krishna Domínguez (MEX), Roberto Fernández (CRC), Samuel Hidalgo (DOM)

=== Group D ===
Pos	Team	Pld	W	L	PF	PA	PD	Pts	Qualification
1	(Brazil) Sesi Franca	6	6	0	513	437	+76	12	Advance to quarter-finals
2	(Argentina) Instituto	6	3	3	469	472	−3	9	Advance to quarter-finals
3	(Chile) Colegio Los Leones	6	0	6	427	500	−73	6	

Source: FIBA
Rules for classification: 1) Points; 2) Head-to-head results; 3) Points difference; 4) Points scored.

14 December 2024	Instituto (Argentina)	76–81	(Brazil) Sesi Franca	Córdoba, Argentina
20:10	Scoring by quarter: 21–18, 20–17, 15–29, 20–17
	Pts: Copello 17; Rebs: Pomoli 10; Asts: Pomoli 6	Boxscore	Pts: Louzada 24; Rebs: Georginho 7 Asts: Georginho 8	Arena: Gimnasio Ángel Sandrín; Referees: Andrés Bartel (URU), Daniel García (VEN), Carmelo de la Rosa (PUR)

15 December 2024	Sesi Franca (Brazil)	88–64	(Chile) Colegio Los Leones	Córdoba, Argentina
22:10	Scoring by quarter: 23–18, 16–13, 26–18, 23–18
	Pts: Hinkle 21; Rebs: Ferreira 9 Asts: Jackson 5	Boxscore	Pts: Castillo, Evans 14; Rebs: Castillo, Johnson 6 Asts: Webster 8	Arena: Gimnasio Ángel Sandrín; Referees: Andrés Bartel (URU), Leonardo Zalazar (ARG), Roberto Fernández (CRC)

16 December 2024	Instituto (Argentina)	77–68	(Chile) Colegio Los Leones	Córdoba, Argentina
22:10	Scoring by quarter: 23–15, 22–17, 15–16, 17–20
	Pts: Pomoli, Vildoza 18; Rebs: three players 7 Asts: Vildoza 7	Boxscore	Pts: Castillo, Evans 16; Rebs: Castillo 10; Asts: Webster 10	Arena: Gimnasio Ángel Sandrín; Referees: Andrés Bartel (URU), Carmelo de la Rosa (PUR), Roberto Fernández (CRC)

9 January 2025	Colegio Los Leones (Chile)	77–81	(Argentina) Instituto	Santiago, Chile
20:10	Scoring by quarter: 29–25, 10–20, 15–23, 23–13
	Pts: Evans 16; Rebs: Evans 9 Asts: Webster 7	Boxscore	Pts: Lugarini 15; Rebs: Lugarini, Saiz 6 Asts: Copello, Saiz 4	Arena: Centro de Deportes Colectivos; Attendance: 539; Referees: Roberto Vázquez (PUR), Carlos Vélez (COL), Jayson Stiell (CAN)

10 January 2025	Instituto (Argentina)	83–91	(Brazil) Sesi Franca	Santiago, Chile
20:10	Scoring by quarter: 22–24, 20–21, 21–22, 20–24
	Pts: Pomoli 17; Rebs: Saiz 6 Asts: three players 4	Boxscore	Pts: Ferreira 18; Rebs: Georginho 7 Asts: Georginho 9	Arena: Centro de Deportes Colectivos; Attendance: 250; Referees: Roberto Vázquez (PUR), Nicolás Flores (PAR), Claudio Osorio (CHI)

11 January 2025	Colegio Los Leones (Chile)	71–83	(Brazil) Sesi Franca	Santiago, Chile
20:10	Scoring by quarter: 13–22, 17–20, 22–20, 19–21
	Pts: Evans 16; Rebs: Lugo 7 Asts: Webster 6	Boxscore	Pts: Dias 20; Rebs: Georginho 8 Asts: Corvalán, Georginho 6	Arena: Centro de Deportes Colectivos; Attendance: 300; Referees: Roberto Vázquez (PUR), Carlos Vélez (COL), Jayson Stiell (CAN)

5 February 2025	Sesi Franca (Brazil)	87–75	(Chile) Colegio Los Leones	Franca, Brazil
19:10	Scoring by quarter: 19–30, 25–18, 21–23, 22–4
	Pts: Dias 18; Rebs: Georginho 12; Asts: Georginho 8	Boxscore	Pts: Davis 19; Rebs: Johnson, Trelles 7 Asts: Trelles 6	Arena: Ginásio Pedrocão; Referees: Orlando Varela (HON), Edwin Quiles (PUR), Grant Todey (USA)

6 February 2025	Colegio Los Leones (Chile)	72–84	(Argentina) Instituto	Franca, Brazil
19:10	Scoring by quarter: 11–22, 17–20, 22–24, 22–18
	Pts: Carrión 13; Rebs: three players 6 Asts: Johnson 4	Boxscore	Pts: Lugarini 16; Rebs: Lugarini 8 Asts: Pomoli 6	Arena: Ginásio Pedrocão; Referees: Andrés Bartel (URU), Edwin Quiles (PUR), Nicolas Zivieri (BRA)

7 February 2025	Sesi Franca (Brazil)	83–68	(Argentina) Instituto	Franca, Brazil
19:10	Scoring by quarter: 17–20, 22–15, 16–20, 28–13
	Pts: Corvalán 14; Rebs: Georginho 9 Asts: Georginho, Jackson 5	Boxscore	Pts: Pomoli 20; Rebs: Negrete 9 Asts: Vildoza 4	Arena: Ginásio Pedrocão; Referees: Andrés Bartel (URU), Orlando Varela (HON), Grant Todey (USA)

== Quarterfinals ==
The quarterfinals took place in March 2025. The four winners advanced to the Final Four. Teams listed as "Team 1" hosted games 2 and 3. The schedule was confirmed on 17 February 2025.

Team 1	Series	Team 2	Game 1	Game 2	Game 3
Real Estelí (Nicaragua)	1–2	(Argentina) Boca Juniors	79–93	97–89	58–72
Flamengo (Brazil)	2–0	(Colombia) Paisas	89–72	102–65	—
KTO Minas (Brazil)	1–2	(Argentina) Instituto	60–67	79–70	74–79
Sesi Franca (Brazil)	2–1	(Argentina) Quimsa	71–69	78–88	84–73

=== Real Estelí vs. Boca Juniors ===
10 March 2025 Game 1	Boca Juniors (Argentina)	93–79 (Series: 1–0)	(Nicaragua) Real Estelí	Buenos Aires, Argentina
21:10	Scoring by quarter: 18–21, 17–18, 35–19, 23–21
	Pts: Vildoza 31; Rebs: Delía 10; Asts: Vildoza 8	Boxscore	Pts: De Jesús 25; Rebs: França 10; Asts: De Jesús, Rice 3	Arena: Estadio Obras Sanitarias; Referees: Omar Bermúdez (MEX), Fernando Leite (BRA), Nicolas Zivieri (BRA)

14 March 2025 Game 2	Real Estelí (Nicaragua)	97–89 (Series: 1–1)	(Argentina) Boca Juniors	Managua, Nicaragua
19:40	Scoring by quarter: 24–21, 22–27, 23–20, 28–21
	Pts: De Jesús 23; Rebs: Rice 9 Asts: De Jesús 7	Boxscore	Pts: Ibargüen, Vega 19; Rebs: Vega 10; Asts: Scala 10	Arena: Polideportivo Alexis Argüello; Attendance: 6,700; Referees: Julio Anaya (PAN), Johnny Batista (PUR), Alan dos Santos (BRA)

15 March 2025 Game 3	Real Estelí (Nicaragua)	58–72 (Series: 1–2)	(Argentina) Boca Juniors	Managua, Nicaragua
19:40	Scoring by quarter: 13–24, 19–16, 14–19, 12–13
	Pts: França 16; Rebs: França 10; Asts: Rice 5	Boxscore	Pts: Ibargüen 15; Rebs: Vega 10; Asts: Scala, Vega 4	Arena: Polideportivo Alexis Argüello; Attendance: 7,500; Referees: Julio Anaya (PAN), Johnny Batista (PUR), Andrés Bartel (URU)

=== Flamengo vs. Paisas ===
9 March 2025 Game 1	Paisas (Colombia)	72–89 (Series: 0–1)	(Brazil) Flamengo	Medellín, Colombia
17:10	Scoring by quarter: 19–23, 24–25, 17–20, 12–21
	Pts: Liz 25; Rebs: Robinson 11; Asts: Liz 4	Boxscore	Pts: Borges 20; Rebs: Miranda 11; Asts: Borges 9	Arena: Coliseo Iván de Bedout; Attendance: 3,950; Referees: Johnny Batista (PUR), Orlando Varela (HON), Waseem Husainy (CAN)

14 March 2025 Game 2	Flamengo (Brazil)	102–65 (Series: 2–0)	(Colombia) Paisas	Rio de Janeiro, Brazil
19:10	Scoring by quarter: 29–12, 37–21, 23–17, 13–15
	Pts: Williams 25; Rebs: Johnson, Williams 6 Asts: Borges 11	Boxscore	Pts: Robinson 10; Rebs: Arboleda 14; Asts: Arboleda, Salcedo 3	Arena: Ginásio do Maracanãzinho; Referees: Leonardo Zalazar (ARG), Juan Fernández (ARG), Claudio Osorio (CHI)

=== KTO Minas vs. Instituto ===
8 March 2025 Game 1	Instituto (Argentina)	67–60 (Series: 1–0)	(Brazil) KTO Minas	Córdoba, Argentina
19:40	Scoring by quarter: 17–17, 20–16, 14–19, 16–8
	Pts: Aaliya 16; Rebs: Pomoli 7 Asts: Vildoza 5	Boxscore	Pts: Hollowell 15; Rebs: Hollowell 10; Asts: three players 3	Arena: Gimnasio Ángel Sandrín; Referees: Andrés Bartel (URU), Carlos Vélez (COL), Edwin Quiles (PUR)

12 March 2025 Game 2	KTO Minas (Brazil)	79–70 (Series: 1–1)	(Argentina) Instituto	Belo Horizonte, Brazil
18:10	Scoring by quarter: 28–23, 11–16, 20–14, 20–17
	Pts: Baralle 21; Rebs: Paranhos 11; Asts: Fuzaro, Hollowell 3	Boxscore	Pts: Aaliya 17; Rebs: Holt 6 Asts: Negrete, Pomoli 3	Arena: Arena Minas Tênis Clube; Referees: Carlos Peralta (ECU), Daniel García (VEN), Edwin Quiles (PUR)

13 March 2025 Game 3	KTO Minas (Brazil)	74–79 (Series: 1–2)	(Argentina) Instituto	Belo Horizonte, Brazil
18:10	Scoring by quarter: 21–32, 19–10, 10–23, 24–14
	Pts: Arengo 19; Rebs: three players 8 Asts: Machado 4	Boxscore	Pts: Pomoli 21; Rebs: Lugarini 8 Asts: Vildoza 7	Arena: Arena Minas Tênis Clube; Referees: Carlos Peralta (ECU), Daniel García (VEN), Orlando Varela (HON)

=== Sesi Franca vs. Quimsa ===
8 March 2025 Game 1	Quimsa (Argentina)	69–71 (Series: 0–1)	(Brazil) Sesi Franca	Santiago del Estero, Argentina
22:10	Scoring by quarter: 17–14, 12–21, 30–20, 10–16
	Pts: Robinson 26; Rebs: Basabe 8 Asts: Brussino 9	Boxscore	Pts: Louzada 21; Rebs: Georginho 7 Asts: Georginho 6	Arena: Estadio Ciudad; Attendance: 1,400; Referees: Carlos Peralta (ECU), Daniel García (VEN), Ryan Johnson (USA)

12 March 2025 Game 2	Sesi Franca (Brazil)	78–88 (Series: 1–1)	(Argentina) Quimsa	Franca, Brazil
20:40	Scoring by quarter: 17–23, 26–24, 14–19, 21–22
	Pts: Dias 28; Rebs: Georginho 10; Asts: Dias, Georginho 3	Boxscore	Pts: Miller 23; Rebs: Robinson 7 Asts: Brussino 9	Arena: Ginásio Pedrocão; Attendance: 1,445; Referees: Roberto Vázquez (PUR), Krishna Domínguez (MEX), Carmelo de la Rosa (PUR)

13 March 2025 Game 3	Sesi Franca (Brazil)	84–73 (Series: 2–1)	(Argentina) Quimsa	Franca, Brazil
20:40	Scoring by quarter: 19–16, 19–28, 27–7, 19–22
	Pts: Georginho 24; Rebs: Georginho 10; Asts: Georginho 3	Boxscore	Pts: Robinson 16; Rebs: Miller 10; Asts: Brussino 4	Arena: Ginásio Pedrocão; Attendance: 1,493; Referees: Roberto Vázquez (PUR), Carmelo de la Rosa (PUR), Carlos Vélez (COL)

== Final Four ==
The Final Four took place on 18 and 19 April 2025. On 1 April, FIBA announced the round will be hosted by Flamengo at the Ginásio do Maracanãzinho in Rio de Janeiro, Brazil.

=== Bracket ===
Semifinals
18 April
(Brazil) Flamengo	91
(Brazil) Sesi Franca	67
18 April
(Argentina) Boca Juniors	80
(Argentina) Instituto	73

Final
19 April
(Brazil) Flamengo	83
(Argentina) Boca Juniors	57
Third place game
19 April
(Brazil) Sesi Franca	74
(Argentina) Instituto	59

=== Semifinals ===
18 April 2025	Boca Juniors (Argentina)	80–73	(Argentina) Instituto	Rio de Janeiro, Brazil
18:10	Scoring by quarter: 19–19, 15–15, 19–13, 27–26
	Pts: J. Vildoza 20; Rebs: Delía, Ibargüen 6 Asts: Scala 6	Boxscore	Pts: Pomoli 18; Rebs: Lugarini 7 Asts: L. Vildoza 5	Arena: Ginásio do Maracanãzinho; Referees: Andrés Bartel (URU), Carlos Peralta (ECU), Carlos Vélez (COL)

18 April 2025	Flamengo (Brazil)	91–67	(Brazil) Sesi Franca	Rio de Janeiro, Brazil
21:10	Scoring by quarter: 22–18, 20–11, 23–11, 26–27
	Pts: Borges 24; Rebs: Miranda 7 Asts: Borges 9	Boxscore	Pts: Hinkle 14; Rebs: Georginho 8 Asts: Georginho 4	Arena: Ginásio do Maracanãzinho; Referees: Julio Anaya (PAN), Daniel García (VEN), Orlando Varela (HON)

=== Third place game ===
19 April 2025	Sesi Franca (Brazil)	74–59	(Argentina) Instituto	Rio de Janeiro, Brazil
17:10	Scoring by quarter: 16–13, 23–18, 19–11, 16–17
	Pts: Georginho 18; Rebs: Georginho 10; Asts: Georginho 5	Boxscore	Pts: Negrete 18; Rebs: Holt 7 Asts: four players 3	Arena: Ginásio do Maracanãzinho; Referees: Andrés Bartel (URU), Krishna Domínguez (MEX), Carmelo de la Rosa (PUR)

=== Final ===
19 April 2025	Flamengo (Brazil)	83–57	(Argentina) Boca Juniors	Rio de Janeiro, Brazil
21:10	Scoring by quarter: 30–13, 19–16, 11–16, 23–12
	Pts: Deodato 16; Rebs: Miranda 9 Asts: Borges 6	Boxscore	Pts: Cuello 16; Rebs: Delía 5 Asts: Scala, Vildoza 5	Arena: Ginásio do Maracanãzinho; Referees: Julio Anaya (PAN), Carlos Peralta (ECU), Orlando Varela (HON)
