= Jordan Mathews =

American basketball player (born 1994)

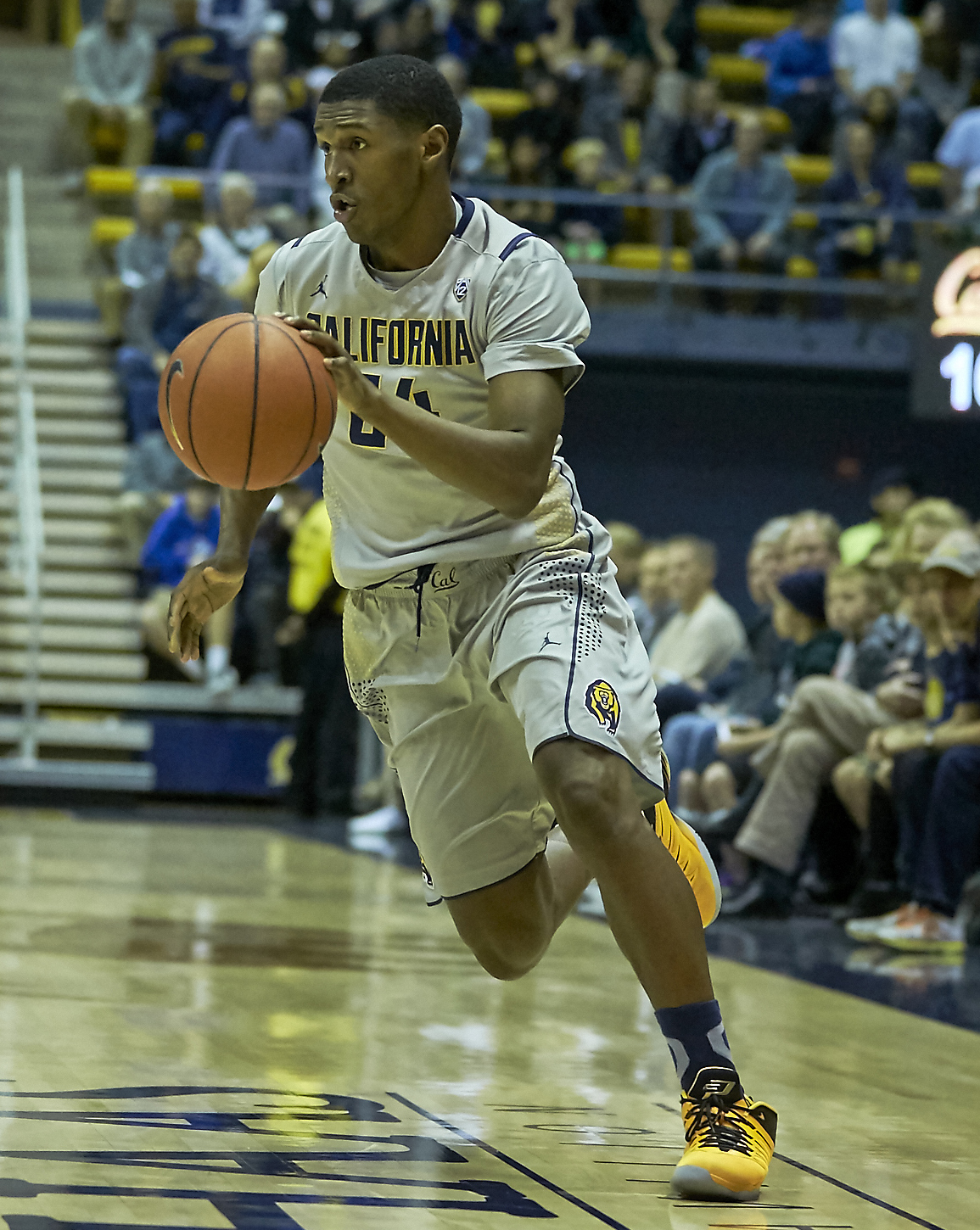
- Mathews with the California Golden Bears in 2015

Free agent
- Position: Shooting guard

Personal information
- Born: June 22, 1994 (age 32) Los Angeles, California, U.S.
- Listed height: 6 ft 4 in (1.93 m)
- Listed weight: 203 lb (92 kg)

Career information
- High school: Santa Monica (Santa Monica, California)
- College: California (2013–2016); Gonzaga (2016–2017)
- NBA draft: 2017: undrafted
- Playing career: 2017–present

Career history
- 2017–2018: Erie BayHawks
- 2018–2019: Team FOG Næstved
- 2019–2020: Vanoli Cremona
- 2021: BC Enisey
- 2022–2023: Spójnia Stargard
- 2024: Nacional
- Stats at Basketball Reference

Jordan Philip Mathews (born June 22, 1994) is an American professional basketball player. He played college basketball for California and Gonzaga.

== College career ==
Out of Santa Monica High School, Mathews was a top recruit out of high school for California. He had a solid freshman campaign under coach Mike Montgomery and had a 32-point game versus Oregon. As a sophomore, Mathews averaged 13.6 points per game. He posted 13.5 points per game as a junior and earned his degree after taking six classes in 12 weeks. He opted to transfer to Gonzaga for his final collegiate season because he did not have a great relationship with Golden Bears coach Cuonzo Martin.

Mathews endured a brief shooting slump in February 2017 but rebounded to make three 3-pointers and score 15 points in a win over San Diego. Mathews hit the go-ahead 3-pointer with under a minute to go in the Sweet 16 win over West Virginia and finished with 13 points. As a senior at Gonzaga, Mathews 10.6 points, 3.3 rebounds and 1.5 assists per game in helping the Bulldogs reach the National Championship game. He hit a team-high 85 3-pointers.

== Professional career ==
After going undrafted in the 2017 NBA draft, Mathews played for the New Orleans Pelicans and Phoenix Suns in the 2017 NBA Summer League. On September 21, 2017, Mathews signed with the Atlanta Hawks. He was released on October 13 as one of the team's final preseason roster cuts. Mathews subsequently joined the Erie BayHawks of the NBA G League for the 2017–18 season. He came off the bench for a team-high 20 points in a 115–96 loss to the Fort Wayne Mad Ants on March 17, 2018. Mathews averaged 8.8 points in 48 games in his rookie season, shooting 38.4 percent from the field. He played for the Los Angeles Clippers in the 2018 NBA Summer League.

On July 26, 2018, Mathews signed with Team FOG Næstved of the Danish Basketligaen.

On July 18, 2019, Mathews signed with Vanoli Cremona of the Italian Lega Basket Serie A.

On January 17, 2021, Mathews signed with BC Enisey of the Russian VTB United League.

On August 3, 2022, Mathews signed with Spójnia Stargard of the Polish Basketball League (PLK).

In March 2024, Mathews joined Nacional of the Liga Uruguaya de Básquetbol.

== Personal life ==
Mathews is the older brother of professional basketball player Jonah Mathews. His father, Phil Mathews, is the head coach of Riverside City College.
