= Eloy Vargas =

Dominican basketball player

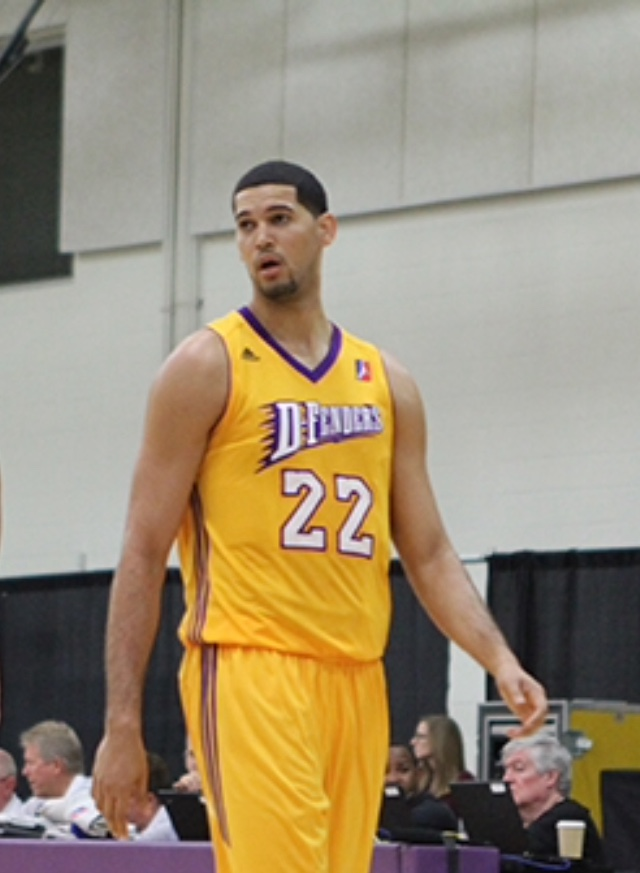

No. 30 – Paisas
- Position: Center
- League: BCL Americas

Personal information
- Born: December 30, 1988 (age 37) Moca, Dominican Republic
- Listed height: 6 ft 11 in (2.11 m)
- Listed weight: 240 lb (109 kg)

Career information
- High school: American Heritage (Plantation, Florida)
- College: Florida (2008–2009); Miami Dade College (2009–2010); Kentucky (2010–2012)
- NBA draft: 2012: undrafted
- Playing career: 2012–present

Career history
- 2012: Cañeros de La Romana
- 2013: Cupes de los Pepines
- 2013: San Lázaro
- 2013: Cañeros de La Romana
- 2013–2014: Fuenlabrada
- 2014: Metros de Santiago
- 2014–2015: Los Angeles D-Fenders
- 2015: Vaqueros de Bayamón
- 2015: Metros de Santiago
- 2015: Kavala
- 2015–2016: Defensor Sporting
- 2016: San Carlos
- 2016: Metros de Santiago
- 2017: GECR Indalo
- 2017: Metros de Santiago
- 2017–2018: Boulazac Dordogne
- 2018–2019: GECR Indalo
- 2019: Trotamundos de Carabobo
- 2019–2020: Flamengo
- 2020: Chemidor B.C.
- 2021: Metros de Santiago
- 2021–2022: Boca Juniors
- 2022–2023: Aguada
- 2023: Trotamundos de Carabobo
- 2023: Titanes de Barranquilla
- 2024: Peñarol
- 2024: Metros de Santiago
- 2025–present: Paisas Basketball

Career highlights
- LNB champion (2014); NCAA champion (2012); NJCAA D1 second-team All-America (2010)
- Stats at Basketball Reference

Eloy Antônio Camacho Vargas (born December 30, 1988) is a Dominican professional basketball player for Paisas Basketball of the Basketball Champions League Americas. He started his collegiate basketball career at Florida, and finished it at Kentucky, and represents the Dominican national team in international competition.

== Professional career ==
After graduating from the University of Kentucky in 2012, Vargas returned to the Dominican Republic to play for Cañeros de La Romana of the Liga Nacional de Baloncesto.

On August 24, 2012, Vargas signed a two-year deal with CB Clavijo of the LEB Oro. He later left Clavijo in September 2012 before appearing in a game for them. He then signed with Alba Fehérvár of Hungary in October 2012 but did not end up joining the team. He went on to play for three Dominican teams in 2013: Cupes de los Pepines, San Lazaro and Cañeros de La Romana.

In July 2013, Vargas joined the New York Knicks for the 2013 NBA Summer League. On November 27, 2013, he signed with Baloncesto Fuenlabrada of Spain for the rest of the 2013–14 season. In June 2014, he joined Metros de Santiago of the Liga Nacional de Baloncesto.

On November 1, 2014, Vargas was selected by the Los Angeles D-Fenders with the 17th overall pick in the 2014 NBA Development League Draft. In April 2015, he signed with Vaqueros de Bayamón of the Puerto Rican Baloncesto Superior Nacional. In June 2015, he re-signed with Metros de Santiago for the 2015 LNB season.

On September 28, 2015, he signed with Kavala of the Greek Basket League. In November 2015, he parted ways with Kavala after appearing in seven games. In early December 2015, he signed with Defensor Sporting of the Liga Uruguaya de Basketball.

On July 28, 2017, Vargas signed with French club Boulazac Dordogne for the 2017–18 season.

Vargas spent the 2019–20 season in Brazil with Flamengo Basketball. On September 26, 2020, he signed with Chemidor Qom of the Iranian league.
