= São Paulo FC (futsal) =

Brazilian futsal club

São Paulo
- Nicknames: Tricolor Paulista (Paulista Tricolour); O Clube da Fé (The Faith Team); Soberano (Sovereign)
- Founded: 1970s
- Ground: Ginásio do Morumbi
- Capacity: 1,918
- President: Julio Casares
- League: Liga Nacional de Futsal (1999–2015); Liga Paulista de Futsal (2021–present)
- Website: http://www.saopaulofc.net/
Home colors	Away colors

The futsal department of São Paulo FC is the area of the club designated for the futsal competitions. Disputed in the Liga Nacional de Futsal (LNF) several times, but always in partnership with another team previously established and now with its own independent futsal department, it disputes the competitions of Liga Paulista de Futsal, the state level of futsal in São Paulo, since 2021.

== Participations at Liga Nacional de Futsal ==
São Paulo disputed the main futsal competition in Brazil for sixteen times:

Season	Partnership	Final standings
1999	São Paulo/Osasco	4th of 13
2000	São Paulo/Osasco	5th of 14
2001	Did not play	
2002	São Paulo/Barueri	10th of 12
2003	São Paulo/São Caetano Futsal	7th of 17
2004	São Paulo/Santo André	16th of 17
2005	São Paulo/Santo André	13th of 16
2006	São Paulo/Santo André	18th of 20
2007	São Paulo/Marília Futsal	19th of 20
2008	Praia Clube/São Paulo	18th of 20
2009	São Paulo/AD Suzano Futsal	17th of 19
2010	São Paulo/Marília Futsal	20th of 21
2011	São Paulo/Marília Futsal	18th of 23
2012	Colégio Londrinense/São Paulo	12th of 20
2013	Suzano/São Paulo/Penalty	17th of 19
2014	São Paulo/FIB Bauru	18th of 19
2015	São Paulo/AD São Bernardo Futsal	8th of 20

== Participations at Liga Paulista de Futsal ==
Since 2021 there are two LPF competitions per year: the Copa LPF (English: LPF Cup) that occurs in the first semester, and the Liga LPF (English: LPF League) that occurs in the second semester.

=== Copa LPF ===
Season	Final standings
2021	Semifinals
2022	Quarterfinals
2023	Quarterfinals

- Note: 2021 Copa FPF is not finished due to COVID-19 pandemic

=== Liga LPF ===
Season	Final standings
2013	Semifinals (as Suzano/São Paulo/Penalty)
2014	Second stage (as São Paulo/FIB Bauru)
2015	Second stage (as São Paulo/FIB Bauru)
2016–2020	Inactive
2021	Quarterfinals
2022	7th of 10 (Group A)
2023	Round of 16

== Honours ==
=== Main competitions ===
- Campeonato Brasileiro de Clubes de Ligas
  - Winners (1): 2023

As São Paulo/Osasco:

- Campeonato Paulista de Futsal (FPFS):
  - Winners (2): 1998, 1999

FPFS - Federação Paulista de Futsal

=== Youth competitions ===
- Campeonato Paulista Sub-09/10
  - Winners (1): 1980
- Campeonato Paulista Sub-11/12
  - Winners (3): 1979, 2007, 2014
- Campeonato Paulista Sub-13/14
  - Winners (2): 2006, 2007
- Campeonato Paulista Sub-15/16
  - Winners (3): 1977, 2009, 2011
- Campeonato Metropolitano Sub-09/10
  - Winners (2): 1980, 2003
- Campeonato Metropolitano Sub-11/12
  - Winners (4): 1976, 1978, 1979, 2014
- Campeonato Metropolitano Sub-13/14
  - Winners (4): 1982, 1983, 1985
- Campeonato Metropolitano Sub-15/16
  - Winners (1): 1986
- Campeonato Metropolitano A1 – Série Prata Sub-12
  - Winners (2): 2022, 2023
- Campeonato Metropolitano A2 – Série Ouro Sub-12
  - Winners (2): 2023, 2024
- Campeonato Metropolitano A1 – Série Prata Sub-14
  - Winners (1): 2022
