= Glenn Cosey =

American basketball player

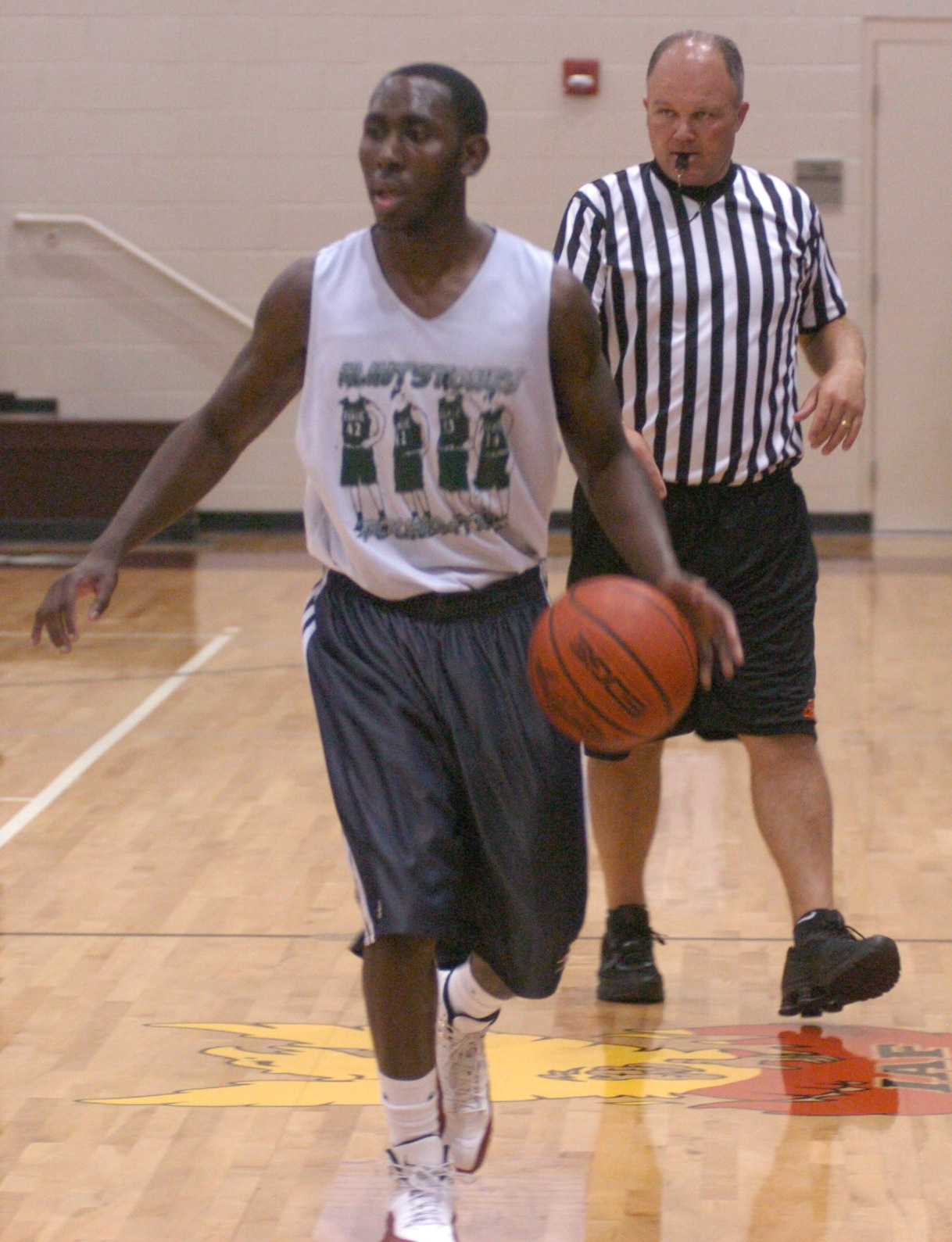
- Cosey in High School

No. 66 – Diablos Rojos del México
- Position: Point guard
- League: LNBP

Personal information
- Born: February 17, 1992 (age 34) Flint, Michigan, U.S.
- Listed height: 6 ft 0 in (1.83 m)
- Listed weight: 182 lb (83 kg)

Career information
- High school: Carman-Ainsworth (Flint Township, Michigan)
- College: Columbus State (2010–2012); Eastern Kentucky (2012–2014)
- NBA draft: 2014: undrafted
- Playing career: 2014–present

Career history
- 2014–2015: ALM Évreux
- 2015–2016: Zadar
- 2016: Pertevniyal
- 2016–2017: Derthona
- 2017–2018: Polski Cukier Toruń
- 2018: Seoul Samsung Thunders
- 2018–2019: ČEZ Nymburk
- 2019: VEF Rīga
- 2019–2020: Krka
- 2020: Bakken Bears
- 2020–2021: Lavrio
- 2021: Semt77 Yalovaspor
- 2021–2022: Peristeri
- 2022: Zastal Zielona Góra
- 2022–2023: VEF Rīga
- 2023–2024: Nizhny Novgorod
- 2024: Maroussi
- 2025: Paisas Basketball
- 2025: Shahrdari Gorgan
- 2025–2026: Antonine
- 2026: Split
- 2026–present: Diablos Rojos del México

Career highlights
- Latvian League champion (2019); Czech League champion (2018); Polish Cup winner (2018); First-team All-OVC (2014); OVC All-Newcomer Team (2013)

Glenn Miller Cosey (born February 17, 1992) is an American professional basketball player for Diablos Rojos del México of the Liga Nacional de Baloncesto Profesional (LNBP).

== High school career ==
Cosey played high school basketball at Carman-Ainsworth High School, in Flint Township, Michigan.

== College career ==
Cosey played college basketball with Columbus State and Eastern Kentucky after finishing high school at Carman-Ainsworth High School.

== Professional career ==
In February 2018, Cosey won the Polish Basketball Cup with Polskie Cukier Toruń. He scored a game-high 36 points in the final, which Toruń won 88–81 over Stelmet Zielona Góra.

On October 6, 2020, he signed with Bakken Bears of Basketligaen. Cosey averaged 16.2 points, 3.4 rebounds and 7.8 assists per game in five games.

On December 4, 2020, Cosey signed with Lavrio of the Greek Basket League, which he partially led to the league finals for the first time and a very successful season overall.

On June 30, 2021, he signed with Semt77 Yalovaspor of the Turkish BSL. In nine games, Cosey averaged 10.7 points, 3.7 assists, and 2.6 rebounds per game.

On November 30, 2021, Cosey signed with Peristeri of the Greek Basket League. In a total of 15 games, he averaged 8.5 points, 1.5 rebounds, 2.7 assists and 0.4 steals, playing around 23 minutes per contest.

On July 20, 2022, he signed with Zastal Zielona Góra of the Polish Basketball League (PLK).

On January 23, 2024, Cosey returned to Greece for Maroussi.
