= 2023 BCL Americas Final =

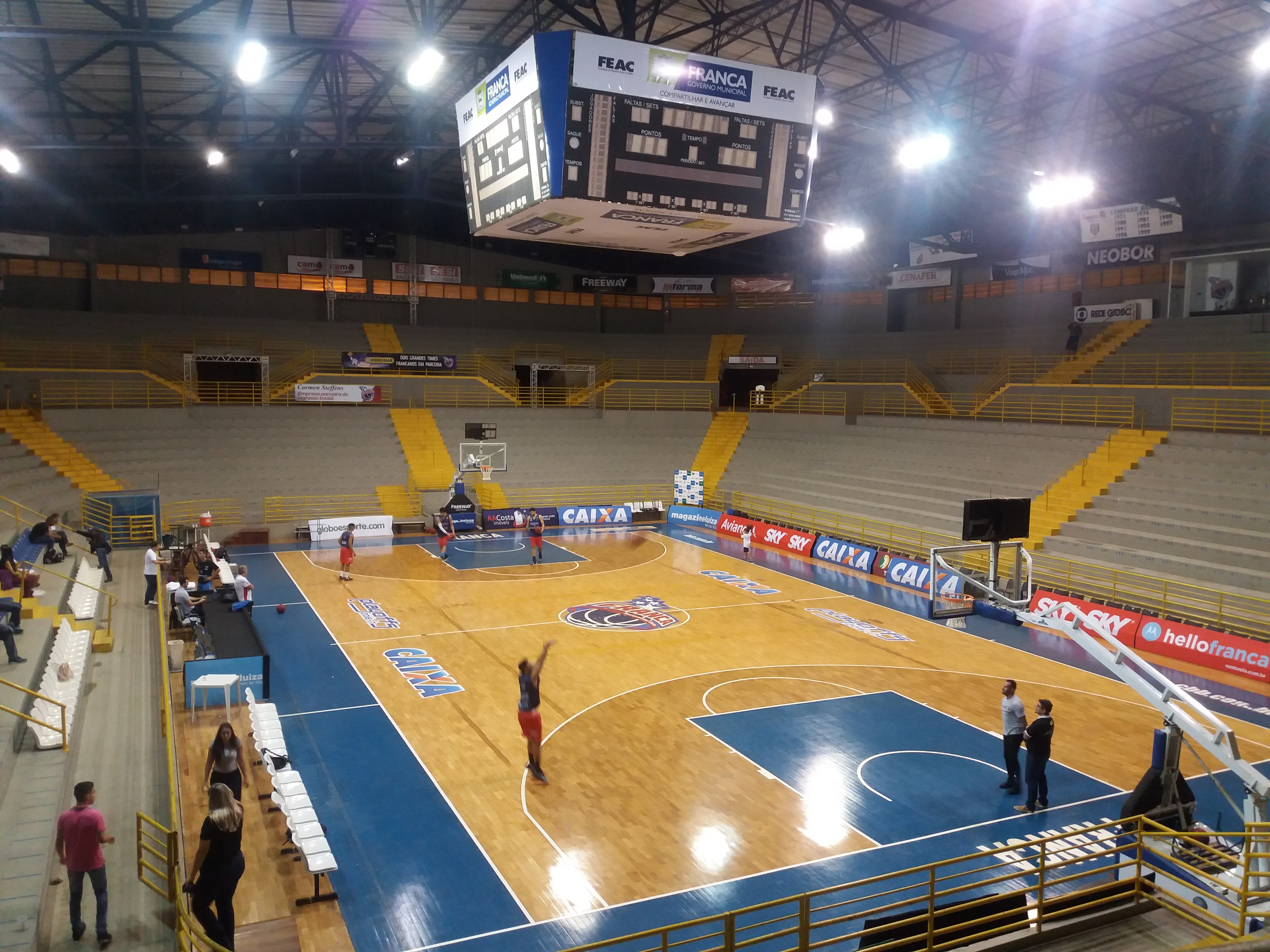
- The Pedrocão hosted the Final
- Event: 2022–23 BCL Americas
Flamengo	Sesi Franca
(Brazil)	(Brazil)
(8–1)	(9–0)
79	88
Head coach: Gustavo de Conti	Head coach: Helinho
	1	2	3	4	Total
Flamengo	17	21	22	19	79
Sesi Franca	29	20	15	24	88
- Date: 15 April 2023
- Venue: Ginásio Pedrocão, Franca
- MVP: Lucas Mariano

The 2023 BCL Americas Final was the final game of the 2022–23 BCL Americas, the 4th season of the league under its new entity and the 16th of the Pan-American premier basketball league organised by FIBA. It was played at the Ginásio Pedrocão in Franca on 15 April 2023. The game was played between Brazilian clubs Flamengo and Sesi Franca.

Franca won its tenth continental title and the first under the BCLA tournament. Lucas Mariano was the team's key player and won the league's MVP award.

== Teams ==
In the following table, finals until 2020 were in the FIBA Americas League and South American Championship eras.

Team	Previous final appearances (bold indicates winners)
(Brazil) Flamengo	4 (**1953**, **2014**, 2020, **2021**)
(Brazil) Sesi Franca	13 (**1974**, **1975**, **1977**, 1978, **1980**, **1990**, **1991**, 1992, **1993**, **1994**, 1996, **1997**, **1999**)

== Road to the final ==
- (H): Home game
- (A): Away game
- (N): Neutral venue

(Brazil) Flamengo				Round	(Brazil) Sesi Franca			
Opponent	Result			Group phase	Opponent	Result		
(Argentina) Instituto	81–89 (Montevideo)			Gameday 1	(Chile) Universidad de Concepción	106–92 (Concepción)		
(Uruguay) Peñarol	94–67 (Montevideo)			Gameday 2	(Argentina) Obras Sanitarias	104–87 (Concepción)		
(Uruguay) Peñarol	103-47 (H)			Gameday 3	(Chile) Universidad de Concepción	83–76 (Buenos Aires)		
(Argentina) Instituto	91-46 (H)			Gameday 4	(Argentina) Obras Sanitarias	83–76 (Buenos Aires)		
(Argentina) Instituto	79–71 (Córdoba)			Gameday 5	(Argentina) Obras Sanitarias	105–65 (H)		
(Uruguay) Peñarol	94–72 (Córdoba)			Gameday 6	(Chile) Universidad de Concepción	103–63 (H)		
**Group C first place**: Pos / Team / Pld / Pts; **1** / (Brazil) Flamengo / **6** / **11**; 2 / (Uruguay) Peñarol / 6 / **8**; 3 / (Argentina) Instituto / 6 / **8**; Source: BCL Americas				Group phase	**Group D first place**: Pos / Team / Pld / Pts; **1** / (Brazil) Sesi Franca / **6** / **12**; 2 / (Chile) Universidad de Concepción / 6 / **8**; 3 / (Argentina) Obras Basket / 6 / **7**; Source: BCL Americas			
Opponent	Agg.	1st leg	2nd leg	Playoffs	Opponent	Agg.	1st leg	2nd leg
(Chile) Universidad de Concepción	2–0	92–64 (A)	88–86 (H)	Quarterfinals	(Uruguay) Peñarol	2–0	91–84 (A)	87–72 (H)
(Brazil) 123 Minas	80–75 (N)			Semifinals	(Argentina) Quimsa	91–73 (H)		

== Game details ==
15 April 2023	Flamengo (Brazil)	79–**88**	(Brazil) **Sesi Franca**	Franca, Brazil
20:30	Scoring by quarter: 17–**29**, **21**–20, **22**–15, 19–**24**
	Pts: Deodato 25; Rebs: Hettsheimeir 6 Asts: five players 1	Boxscore	Pts: Georginho, Lucas M. 16; Rebs: three players 7 Asts: Georginho 5	Arena: Pedrocão; Referees: Roberto Vásquez (PUR), Julio Anaya (PAN), Juan Fernández (ARG)

Starters:			Pts	Reb	Ast
PG	5	(Brazil) Ricardo Fischer	2	0	1
SG	7	(Argentina) Nicolás Aguirre	0	0	0
SF	9	(Brazil) Gabriel Galvanini	12	3	1
PF	44	(Argentina) Martín Cuello	18	4	1
C	30	(Brazil) Rafael Hettsheimeir	10	6	0
Reserves:					
SF	1	(Brazil) Guilherme Deodato	25	4	0
PG	11	(Argentina) José Vildoza	2	3	0
F	12	(Brazil) Rafael Mineiro	4	3	1
PF	16	(Brazil) Carlos Olivinha	0	0	0
PF	19	(Colombia) Andrés Ibargüen	2	5	0
SF	25	(Mexico) Lucas Martinez	4	3	1
PF	90	(Brazil) Emanuel Fernandes	DNP		
Head coach:
(Brazil) Gustavo de Conti

**Flamengo**	**Sesi Franca**

Flamengo	Statistics	Sesi Franca
17/31 (55%)	2-pt field goals	22/37 (60%)
11/42 (26%)	3-pt field goals	10/21 (48%)
12/23 (52%)	Free throws	14/18 (78%)
16	Offensive rebounds	7
21	Defensive rebounds	34
37	Total rebounds	41
5	Assists	11
11	Turnovers	15
11	Steals	5
0	Blocks	2
21	Fouls	22

2023 BCL Americas champions

**Sesi Franca**
1st league title
11th continental title

Starters:			Pts	Reb	Ast
PG	14	(Brazil) Georginho	16	4	5
SG	7	(Brazil) Jhonatan dos Santos	3	4	0
SF	9	(Brazil) Lucas Dias	15	7	1
PF	1	(United States) David Jackson	11	6	2
C	28	(Brazil) Lucas Mariano	16	7	1
Reserves:					
PF	0	(United States) Michael Smith	6	0	1
C	3	(Brazil) Márcio Santos	8	7	2
SF	6	(Argentina) Santiago Scala	13	0	1
PF	11	(Brazil) Eduardo Elevi	DNP		
PF	29	(Brazil) Reynan Santos	DNP		
PF	43	(Brazil) Nathan Fernandes	DNP		
PF	58	(Brazil) Paulo Barbosa	DNP		
Head coach:
(Brazil) Helinho
