= Ginásio do Morumbi =

Indoor sporting arena

Ginásio Poliesportivo Doutor Antônio Leme Nunes Galvão
- Ginásio do Morumbi
- Interactive map of Ginásio Poliesportivo Doutor Antônio Leme Nunes Galvão
- Former names: Ginásio Décio Pacheco Pedroso
- Location: Morumbi, São Paulo; Brazil
- Coordinates: 23.601321164058294°S 46.72106580143673°W
- Owner: São Paulo FC
- Capacity: 1,918
- Type: indoor sporting arena

Construction
- Opened: 5 November 1982

Tenants
- São Paulo FC (basketball); São Paulo FC (futsal)

Website
- SPFC Basketball

The Ginásio do Morumbi (Ginásio Poliesportivo Doutor Antônio Leme Nunes Galvão) is the main indoor sporting arena of the São Paulo FC. It is currently used by the basketball team in the dispute of the NBB, and the futsal team in the dispute of the Liga Paulista de Futsal.
