= 2020 BCL Americas Final =

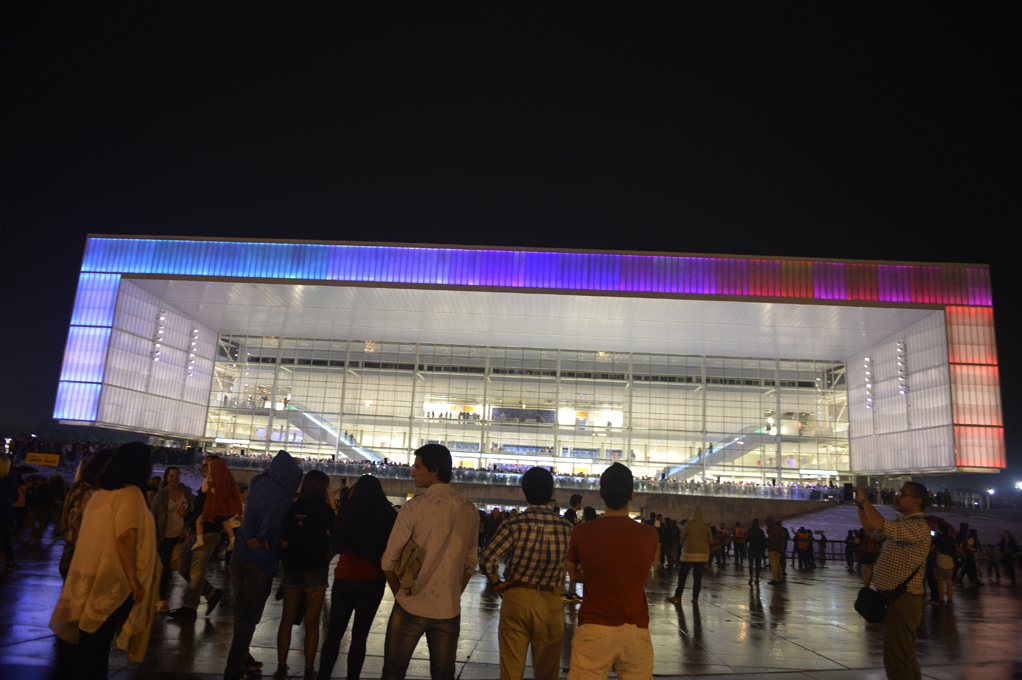
- The Antel Arena in Montevideo hosted the final
- Event: 2019–20 BCL Americas
Quimsa	Flamengo
(Argentina)	(Brazil)
92	86
Head coach: Jorge Sebastián González	Head coach: Gustavo de Conti
	1	2	3	4	Total
Quimsa	27	23	13	29	92
Flamengo	19	24	25	18	86
- Date: 30 October 2020
- Venue: Antel Arena, Montevideo
- Referees: Andrés Bartel (URU), Gonzalo Salgueiro (URU), Carlos Peralta (ECU)
- Attendance: 0 (Note: On 14 March 2020, FIBA suspended all of its competitions until further notice due to the COVID-19 pandemic. The competition resumed on 27 October 2020 with an altered format, including a single-match final in Montevideo, Uruguay, on 30 October 2020.)

The 2020 BCL Americas Final was the final game of the 2019–20 BCL Americas, the 1st season of the league under its new entity and the 13th of the Pan-American premier basketball league organised by FIBA. It was played at the Antel Arena in Montevideo on 30 October 2020. The game was played between Argentine club Quimsa and Brazilian club Flamengo.

Quimsa won the final 92–86 and captured its first Pan-American championship, thus also qualifying for the 2021 FIBA Intercontinental Cup.

== Teams ==
In the following table, finals until 2020 were in the FIBA Americas League era.

Team	Previous final appearances (bold indicates winners)
(Brazil) Flamengo	1 (**2014**)
(Argentina) Quimsa	None

== Road to the final ==
(Argentina) Quimsa				Round	(Brazil) Flamengo			
Opponent	Result			Group phase	Opponent	Result		
(Uruguay) Aguada	87–61 (H)			Gameday 1	(Argentina) Instituto	83–75 (A)		
(Uruguay) Aguada	100–103 (A)			Gameday 2	(Chile) Valdivia	82–71 (H)		
(Brazil) Franca	98–92 (H)			Gameday 3	(Chile) Valdivia	92–79 (A)		
(Brazil) Franca	82–74 (A)			Gameday 4	(Argentina) Instituto	81–76 (H)		
**Group B first place**: Pos / Team / Pld / Pts; **1** / (Argentina) Quimsa / **4** / **7**; 2 / (Brazil) Franca / 4 / **6**; 3 / (Uruguay) Aguada / 4 / **5**; Source: BCL Americas				Group phase	**Group A first place**: Pos / Team / Pld / Pts; **1** / (Brazil) Flamengo / **4** / **8**; 2 / (Argentina) Instituto / 4 / **6**; 3 / (Chile) Valdivia / 4 / **4**; Source: BCL Americas			
Opponent	First leg	Second leg	Third leg	Playoffs	Opponent	First leg	Second leg	Third leg
(Brazil) Mogi das Cruzes	90–84 (A)	96–83 (H)	—N/a	Quarterfinals	(Mexico) Fuerza Regia	90–67 (A)	103–76 (H)	—N/a
(Argentina) San Lorenzo	91–84 (A)	87–100 (H)	110–97 OT (H)	Semifinals	(Argentina) Instituto	63–54 (A)	66–64 (H)	—N/a

- (H): Home game
- (A): Away game

== Game details ==
30 October 2020	**Quimsa** (Argentina)	**92**–86	(Brazil) Flamengo	Montevideo
20:00 UTC−3	Scoring by quarter: **27**–19, 23–**24**, 13–**25**, **29**–18
	Pts: Robinson 26; Rebs: Ramírez 8 Asts: Copello, Ramírez 3	Boxscore	Pts: Marquinhos 20; Rebs: three players 6 Asts: Balbi 5	Arena: Antel Arena; Attendance: 0 Referees: Andrés Bartel (URU), Gonzalo Salgueiro (URU), Carlos Peralta (ECU)

Starters:			Pts	Reb	Ast
PG	2	(Panama) Trevor Gaskins	8	1	2
SG	10	(Argentina) Nicolas Copello	11	6	3
SF	30	(Argentina) Mauro Cosolito	2	3	1
PF	20	(United States) Diamon Simpson	17	6	0
C	33	(Argentina) Fabián Ramírez	9	8	3
Reserves:					
SG	00	(Argentina) Emiliano Torette	0	0	0
G	5	(Argentina) Pablo Gramajo	5	4	0
G	9	(Argentina) Franco Baralle	9	1	0
SF	15	(United States) Brandon Robinson	26	5	2
G	17	(Argentina) Lucio Longoni	DNP		
C	32	(United States) Anthony Kent	5	7	0
C	34	(Ecuador) Bryan Carabali	DNP		
Head coach:
(Argentine Basketball Confederation) Jorge Sebastián González

**Quimsa**	**Flamengo**

Quimsa	Statistics	Flamengo
24/39 (62%)	2-pt field goals	17/38 (45%)
8/23 (35%)	3-pt field goals	13/32 (41%)
20/30 (67%)	Free throws	13/19 (69%)
13	Offensive rebounds	9
34	Defensive rebounds	24
47	Total rebounds	33
11	Assists	15
13	Turnovers	5
3	Steals	4
3	Blocks	1
21	Fouls	25

2019–20 BCL Americas champions

**Quimsa**
1st title

Starters:			Pts	Reb	Ast
PG	6	(Argentina) Franco Balbi	14	6	5
SF	8	(Argentina) Luciano González	16	1	2
SF	11	(Brazil) Marquinhos	20	3	1
PF	16	(Brazil) Carlos Olivinha	7	6	2
C	12	(Brazil) Rafael Mineiro	8	1	0
Reserves:					
PG	1	(Brazil) Pedro Nunes	0	0	0
PG	2	(Brazil) Yago dos Santos	7	3	1
SF	7	(Brazil) Jhonatan Luz	1	2	1
PF	20	(Brazil) Rafael Rachel	DNP		
C	30	(Brazil) Rafael Hettsheimeir	13	6	3
PF	41	(Brazil) Léo Demétrio	0	1	0
C	88	(Brazil) Douglas Kurtz	DNP		
Head coach:
(Brazilian Basketball Confederation) Gustavo de Conti
