= Franco Balbi =

Argentine basketball player

No. 6 – Flamengo
- Position: Point guard
- League: NBB

Personal information
- Born: August 21, 1989 (age 37) Junín, Buenos Aires, Argentina
- Listed height: 6 ft 2 in (1.88 m)
- Listed weight: 190 lb (86 kg)

Career information
- NBA draft: 2011: undrafted
- Playing career: 2006–present

Career history
- 2006–2009: Ciclista Juninense
- 2009–2011: Quimsa
- 2011: San Martín de Corrientes
- 2011–2013: Ciclista Juninense
- 2013–2016: Argentino de Junín
- 2016–2018: Ferro Carril
- 2018–2022: Flamengo
- 2022–2024: Boca Juniors
- 2024–: Flamengo

Career highlights
- FIBA Intercontinental Cup champion (2022); BCL Americas champion (2021); All-BCL Americas First Team (2024); 2× NBB champion (2019, 2021); All-NBB Team (2019); NBB Best Foreign Player (2019); Brazilian Super 8 Cup winner (2018); Rio de Janeiro State champion (2018); LNB All-Team (2017); Argentine Cup winner (2009)

Franco Nicolás Balbi (born August 21, 1989), is an Argentine professional basketball player who currently plays for Flamengo of Novo Basquete Brasil. At a height of 6 ft 2 in (1.88 m) tall, he plays at the point guard position.

== Professional career ==
Balbi started playing youth club basketball with Club Villa Belgrano, in the city of Junín, when he was 5. He also played with Los Indios de Junín at the youth level, before arriving at Ciclista Juninense, where he made his debut in Argentina's top-level league, the Liga Nacional de Básquet (LNB), on January 14, 2007, against Regatas Corrientes. The following season, Ciclista Juninense got relegated, and had to play in Argentina's second division, the Torneo Nacional de Ascenso (TNA). Balbi turned into a key player on the team, including playing more minutes and having good games, which made Quimsa from Santiago del Estero, sign him up for the 2009–10 LNB season, marking his return to the Argentine first division. That same season, he suffered a severe injury that made him lose minutes the following season, and that ultimately led Quimsa to terminate his contract. He quickly managed to find a new club, San Martín de Corrientes, which he helped achieve a league promotion to the Argentine first division, by finishing as runner-ups in the Torneo Nacional de Ascenso (TNA).

In the following season, he returned to Ciclista Juninense, to play in the second division. After two good seasons, he signed with the club's local rivals, Argentino de Junín, for the 2013–14 LNB season, where he would return to play under his first professional head coach, Adrián Capelli.

With Argentino de Junín, he played in both the 2013–14 season of the Liga Nacional de Básquet, and the Liga Sudamericana de Básquetbol (FIBA South American League). It was a great season, for both him and the club, with the team making the semifinals of both tournaments. In the 2014–15 LNB season, he became a regular starter for Argentino de Junín, and once again played in the Liga Nacional de Básquet and the Liga Sudamericana de Básquetbol. He became an established player in the top level Argentine league, and received noticeable coverage from the local press.

=== Ferro ===
On May 23, 2016, Balbi signed with Ferro, for the Argentine 2016–17 Liga Nacional de Básquet season.

=== Flamengo ===
On June 21, 2018, Balbi signed with the Brazilian NBB club Flamengo, for the 2018–19 NBB season, which marked his first club playing experience outside of Argentina.

==== 2018–2019 ====
In his first year with Flamengo Balbi had a successful season winning the Rio de Janeiro State Championship, Brazilian Super 8 Cup and the NBB league. Besides that he was elected the league's Best Foreign Player and selected to the All-NBB Team, averaging 10.8 ppg and 5.7 apg in 26 regular season games.

==== 2019–2020 ====
On June 19, 2019, Balbi re-signed with Flamengo for one more year.

== National team career ==
After a good 2014–15 LNB season with Argentino de Junín, he was selected to the senior Argentine national basketball team for the first time. He made his debut against Uruguay, in Olavarría.

== Career statistics ==
=== LNB career statistics ===
Season	Team	GP	MPG	2P%	3P%	FT%	RPG	APG	SPG	BPG	PPG
2013–14	Argentino de Junín	50	23.3	.472	.410	.738	2.24	2.1	1.2	.02	9.34
2014–15	Argentino de Junín	54	29.6	.416	.309	.822	3.3	5.57	1.41	.09	11.48
2015–16	Argentino de Junín	62	32.4	.395	.302	.822	4.9	6.19	1.24	.13	11.61
2016–17	Ferro Carril	61	27.5	.393	.286	.723	3.51	6.15	1.33	.05	9.28
2017–18	Ferro Carril	38	30.1	.492	.396	.779	3.71	5.50	1.21	.11	11.61
Career		265	28.58	.434	.341	.777	3.53	5.1	1.27	.08	10.66

=== NBB regular season ===
†	Denotes seasons in which Franco Balbi won NBB championship

Season	Team	GP	MPG	2PT FG%	3PT FG%	FT%	RPG	APG	SPG	BPG	PPG
2018–19†	Flamengo	26	24.3	.485	.371	.808	3.6	5.7	1.8	.0	10.3
Career		26	24.3	.485	.371	.808	3.6	5.7	1.8	.0	10.3

=== NBB playoffs ===
Season	Team	GP	MPG	2PT FG%	3PT FG%	FT%	RPG	APG	SPG	BPG	PPG
2019†	Flamengo	12	30.8	.400	.344	.912	4.7	5.8	1.8	.0	11.8
Career		12	30.8	.400	.344	.912	4.7	5.8	1.8	.0	11.8
