= Club Nacional de Football (basketball) =

Uruguayan basketball team

Nacional
- Nickname: Bolso; Decano; Tricolores (Tricolors); Bolsilludo; Albos (Whites)
- Leagues: Liga Uruguaya de Básquetbol
- Founded: 26 January 1933; 93 years ago
- History: Club Nacional de Football; 1933–present
- Arena: Polideportivo Gran Parque Central
- Capacity: 400
- Location: La Blanqueada, Montevideo, Uruguay
- President: José Fuentes, Ariel Martinez
- Head coach: Leonardo Zylbersztein
- Website: www.nacional.uy
| Home | Away |

Club Nacional de Football, commonly known as simply Nacional, is the basketball section of the Club Nacional de Football club, based in Montevideo, Uruguay. The men's first team plays professionally in the Liga Uruguaya de Básquetbol.

Home games of the team are played in the Polideportivo Gran Parque Central, where there is capacity for 400 people. Nacional participates in the tournaments organised by the Uruguayan basketball federation Federación Uruguaya de Basketball (known as FUBB) since 1932. The club won the championships of 1935 and 1937. Nowadays, Nacional takes part in the Liga Uruguaya de Basketball, Uruguayan basketball first division.

== Honours ==
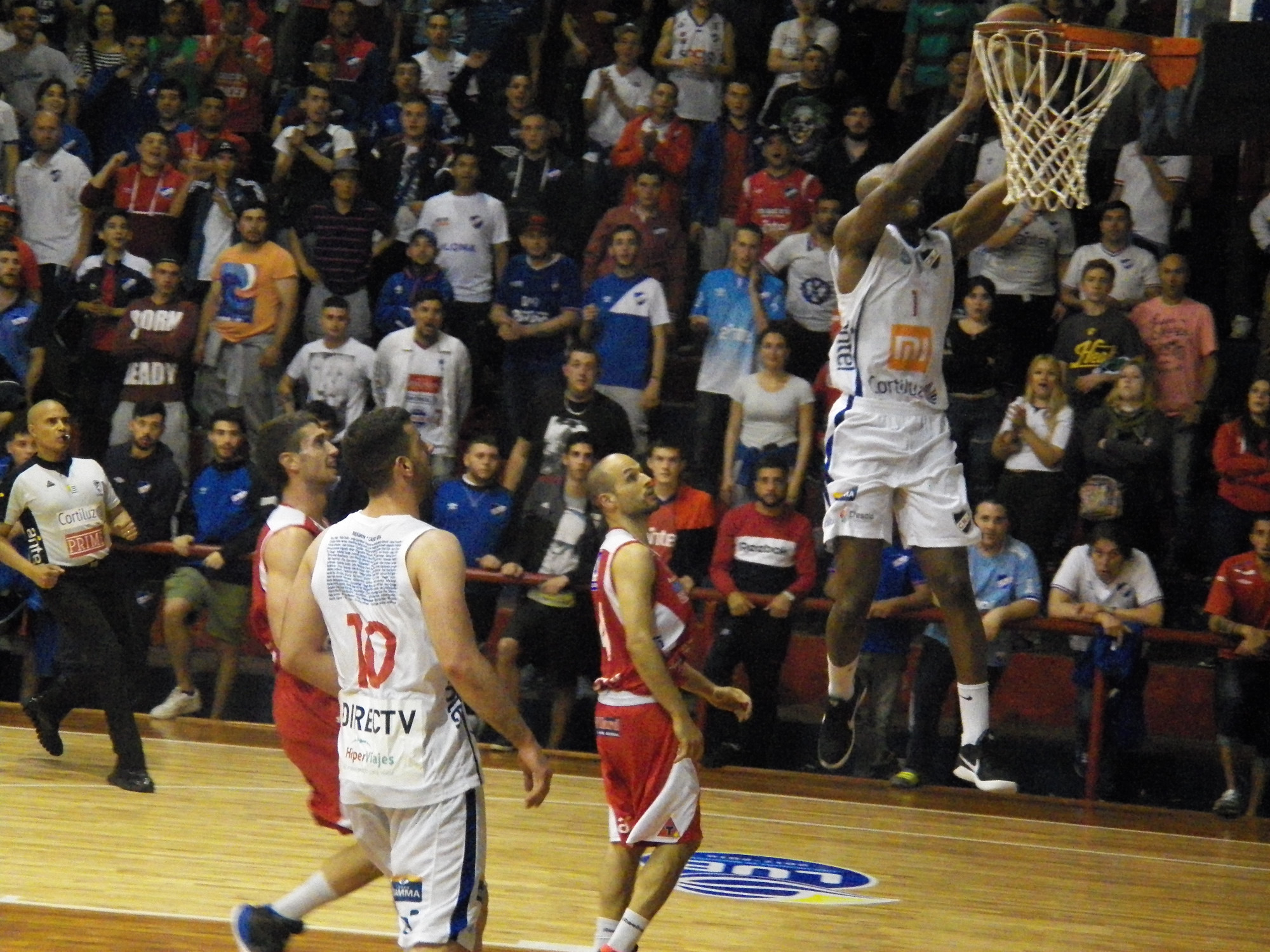
A game of Nacional (in white) in September 2016

- Uruguay Federal Championship
  - Champions (2): 1935, 1937
- Liga Uruguaya de Básquetbol
  - Champions: 2024-25
- Liguilla
  - Champions (2): 1982, 1983

== Players ==
=== Current roster ===
Note: Flags indicate national team eligibility at FIBA-sanctioned events. Players may hold other non-FIBA nationalities not displayed.

Nacional roster
Players
Coaches

| Pos. | No. | Nat. | Name | Ht. |
|---|---|---|---|---|---|---|
| G | 1 | (Uruguay) | Juarez, Ignacio | 1.85 m (6 ft 1 in) |
| C | 2 | (Central African Republic) | Jefferson, Johndre | 2.08 m (6 ft 10 in) |
| C | 5 | (Uruguay) | Baston, Emiliano | 2.00 m (6 ft 7 in) |
| F | 6 | (United States) | Daniels, Will | 2.02 m (6 ft 8 in) | 104 kg (229 lb) | 39 – 21 April 1986 |
| G | 7 | (Uruguay) | Perez, Lautaro | 1.82 m (6 ft 0 in) |
| G/F | 8 | (Uruguay) | Iarrea, Martin | 1.92 m (6 ft 4 in) |
| F | 9 | (Argentina) | Sacco, Jhonatan | 1.96 m (6 ft 5 in) |
| F | 10 | (Uruguay) | Moglia, Santiago | 1.96 m (6 ft 5 in) |
| G | 13 | (Uruguay) | Romero, Manuel | 1.83 m (6 ft 0 in) |
| F | 24 | (United States) | Hinkle, Charles | 1.98 m (6 ft 6 in) | 93 kg (205 lb) | 38 – 11 March 1988 |
| G | 31 | (Uruguay) | Zubiaurre, Mauro | 1.88 m (6 ft 2 in) |
| PG | 99 | (Uruguay) | Rusch, Pierinho | 1.74 m (5 ft 9 in) |

Head coach

- (Uruguay) Leonardo Zylbersztein

Assistant coach(es)

- (Uruguay) Ajeandro Muro

Legend

- (C) Team captain
- Injured

- Roster
Updated: November 21, 2021

=== Notable players ===
Note: Flags indicate national team eligibility at FIBA-sanctioned events. Players may hold other non-FIBA nationalities not displayed.

Criteria

To appear in this section a player must have either:

- Set a club record or won an individual award while at the club
- Played at least one official international match for their national team at any time
- Played at least one official NBA match at any time.

- (United States) Quincy Miller (1 season: 2021–present)
- (Central African Republic) Johndre Jefferson (1 season: 2021–present)
