= Paisas Basketball =

- League: Baloncesto Profesional Colombiano
- Founded: 2023
- History: Paisas Basketball (2023–present)
- Capacity: 6,000
- Location: Medellín, Colombia
- Head coach: Bernardo González
- Championships: 1 (2025)
Home	Away	Third

Paisas Basketball are a Colombian professional basketball team based in Medellín, Antioquia Department. Founded in 2023, they play in the Baloncesto Profesional Colombiano. The team plays its home games at the Coliseo Iván de Bedout, which has capacity for 6,000 people. The team was the first top level team in Antioquia in four years, after some teams had left the Colombian League. The first head coach was Bernardo González, and the club also started a youth academy, including an under-14 team. The following year, in November 2024, Paisas was announced as one of the twelve teams in the 2024–25 BCL Americas season, the top-level continental league.
