= Venezuelan Basketball All-Star Game =

Annual basketball event in Venezuela

LPB All-Star Game
- Status: Inactive
- Frequency: Annually
- Inaugurated: 1974
- Most recent: 2016
- Organizer: LEB; LPB

The LPB All-Star Game was an annual basketball event in Venezuela, organised by the LPB. It started in 1974 and it was first organised by the Liga Especial de Baloncesto.

It is the oldest basketball All-Star game event in South America. Former NBA players like Carl Herrera. Rubén Garcés and Óscar Torres have featured in the event.

== Format ==
The All-Star Game was played between the Criollos (Venezuelan players) and Importados (Foreign players) since 1974 and the creation of the Liga Especial de Baloncesto (LEB). In 2013, the Venezuelans recorded their 13th victory, while the Foreigners had won 21 games until then. A different format based on geographic location was used only twice throughout the years.

The first over time between the two selection was recorded in 2014, with the Importados finally beating the Criollos (137-134). The 2014 edition was the 37th out of 41 seasons and was played in front of 10.000 spectators. The All-Star Game was not played on three occasions: in 1978 due to the Central American Games, in 1983 due to the Pan American Games and in 1992 due conflicts between the LPB league and the Venezuelan Basketball Federation.

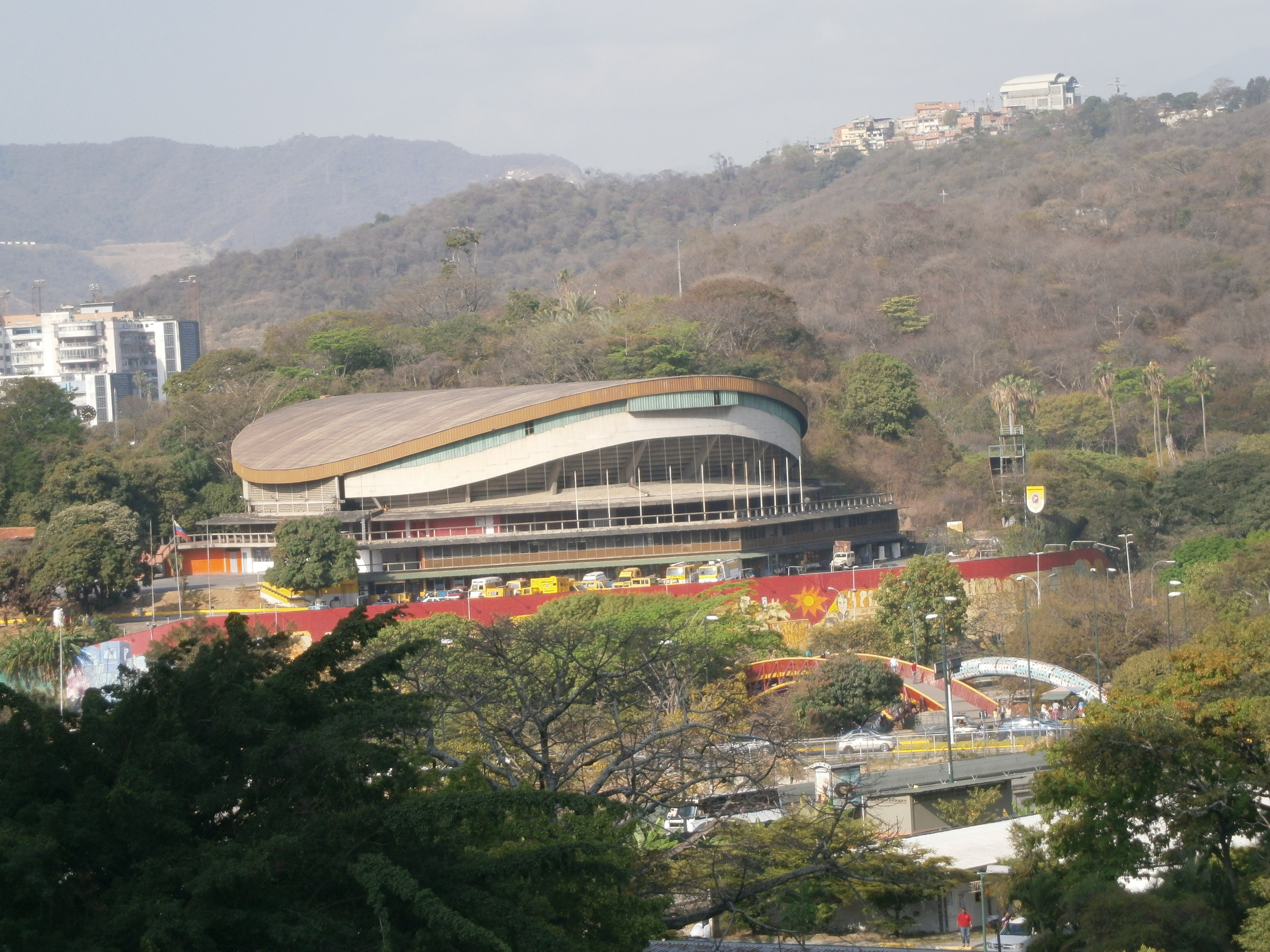
The 2001 edition was held at the Gymnasium of the Central University in Caracas.

The 2010 edition also featured the Future All-Stars Game for players from the newly founded Liga Especial (LEB), a development league (named after the historic Liga Especial, Venezuela's top division between 1974 and 1992). The players were split into two teams, the Eastern Conference and the Western Conference, with the former winning the game with 114-93.

== Events ==
The All-Star Game has also included a slam-dunk contest a three-point shootout and the Skills Challenge that was introduced later. The latter combined free-throws, dribbling and three-point shots.

== List of games ==
Bold: Team that won the game.

Season	Date	Venue	Team 1	Score	Team 2	MVP	Club
1997						(Venezuela) Victor David Diaz	Panteras de Miranda
2000	June 2000	Gimnacio of the Central University	Venezuela Criollos	119 -**125**	**Imports Team**	(United States) Alvin Sims	Toros de Aragua
2001	22 May 2001		**Venezuela Nationals**	**103**-101	Imports Team	(Venezuela) Tomás Aguilera	
2002			**Venezuela Nationals**	defeated	Imports Team	(Venezuela) Richard Lugo	Panteras de Miranda
2003			**Imports Team**	defeated	Nationals		
2004		Ginasio Jose Beracas, Caracas	**Nationals**	**144**-134	Imported Stars	(Venezuela) Victor David Diaz	Panteras de Miranda
2005			Domestic	129-**133**	**Imports Team**	(United States) Harold Arceneaux	Marinos B.B.C.
2006		Maracaibo	**Nationals**	**148** -?	Imported Stars	(Venezuela) Victor David Diaz	Cocodrilos de Caracas
2007			**National Stars**	150-**143**	Imported Stars	(Venezuela) Victor David Diaz (4)	Cocodrilos de Caracas
2008	18 May 2008	Bolivarian Dome, Barquisimeto	**National Stars**		Imported Stars		
2009		El Limon Colisseum, Maracay	National Stars	110-**114**	**Imported Stars**	(United States) Carl Elliott	Cocodrilos de Caracas
2010	22 April 2010	Ginasio Jose Beracas, Caracas	**Nationals**	**136**-123	Imported Stars	(Venezuela) Francisco Centeno	Gaiteros del Zulia
2011	7 May 2011	Forum de Valencia					
2012	16 April 2012	El Limon Colisseum, Maracay	Venezuelans	131-**137**	**Foreigners**	(United States) Darius Adams	Guaiqueries de Margarita
2013	1 May 2013	Ginasio Jose Beracas, Caracas	**Venezuelans**	**150**-145	Foreigners	(Venezuela) Carlos Cedeno (Venezuela) Óscar Torres	Bucaneros de La Guaira; Marinos de Anzoategui
2014	5 April 2014	Domo Bolivariano, Barquisimeto	Venezuelans	134-**137** (OT:124-124)	**Foreigners**	(United States) Robert Glenn	Trotamundos de Carabobo
2015	18 April 2015	Forum de Valencia	**Venezuelans**	**115**-114	Foreigners	(Venezuela) Windi Graterol	Guaros de Lara
2016	3 April 2016		**Venezuelans**	**136**-133	Foreigners	(Venezuela) Héctor Romero	Bucaneros de La Guaira

== Wins by team (1974-2016) ==
Team	Wins
National All Stars	16
Foreign All Stars	22

== Score sheets (2000-2010) ==
- All-Star Game 2000:

DATE: June 2000
VENUE: Gimnacio of the Central University, Caracas
SCORE: Venezuela Criollos – Imports Team 119-125

Venezuela Criollos: Richard Lugo 31, J.C.Espinoza 24, D.Dominguez 13, Carl Herrera 11, Roque Osorio 11

Imports Team: Alvin Sims 29, Ruben Nembhard 21, Darren Henrie 20, L.Booth 11, Andre Riddick 11, Ruben Garces 10

- All-Star Game 2001:

DATE: 22 May 2001
VENUE:
SCORE: Venezuela National Team – Imports Team 103-101

Venezuela National Team: Victor David Diaz (c) 25, Óscar Torres 20, Tomás Aguilera 17, Alex Quiroz 15, Henry Paez 12, Vallenilla 10, Rafael Guevara 4, Vladimir Heredia 4, Ernesto Mijares 3, Hebert Bayona 2, Ruben Pachano 1, Richard Lugo (DNP)

Imports Team: Ronnie Thompkins (c) 33, Anthony Douglas 14, Ryan Hoover 13, Ruben Nembhard 13, Tariq Kirksay 10, Mike Campbell 8, Kerry Blackshear 7, Askia Jones 2, José Vargas, Tim Moore, Rashel Tucker, Fred Williams, Reggie Freeman

- 31st All-Star Game 2004:

DATE:
VENUE: Ginasio Jose Beracas of Naciones Unidas National Park, Caracas
SCORE: Nationals – Imported Stars 144-134

Nationals: Victor David Diaz 40, Ernesto Mijares, Tomás Aguilera, Henry Paez 26, Luis Julio 21 (starters) ;

Imported Stars: Aki Thomas, Ruben Nembhard, Jermaine Walker 22, Ronnie Fields, Sam Clancy Jr. (starters) ; Jack Hartman 20

- 32nd All-Star Game 2009:

DATE:
VENUE: El Limon Colisseum, Maracay
SCORE: Nationals – Imported Stars 110-114

Nationals: Heissler Guillent 18, Amber Marin 18, Richard Lugo 17, José Vargas 16, Eduardo Torres 16, Luis Bethelmy 12, Victor David Diaz 6, Carlos Morris 3, Pablo Machado 2, Jesus Centeno 2, Ruben Pachano 0, Diego Guevara 0, Alejandro Barrios (DNP), Jhon Romero (DNP). Head coach: Nestor Salazar. Assistant: Carl Herrera

Imported Stars: Carl Elliott 23, Kenya Capers 18, Mark Bortz, Michael Gale 17, Hatila Passos 11, Alejandro Flores 10, Ruben Nembhard 8 , Rogers Washington 6, Brian Latham 4, Gustavo Barrera 0, Torraye Braggs 0, Mike Campbell 0, Omar Quintero (DNP). Head coach: Guillermo Narvarte. Assistant: Manolo Cintron

- 33d All-Star Game 2010:

DATE: 22 April 2010
VENUE: Ginasio Jose Beracas of Naciones Unidas National Park, Caracas
SCORE: Nationals – Imported Stars 136-123

Nationals: Heissler Guillent, Gregory Vargas, Jesus Centeno, Diego Guevara, Hector Romero, Juan Herrera, Luis Bethelmy, Axiers Sucre, Tulio Cobos, Richard Lugo, Roque Osorio. Head coach: Sergio Rouco (Marinos de Anzoategui)

Imported Stars: Ruben Nembhard, Kojo Mensah, Marcus Elliott, Alex Galindo, Ryan Forehan-Kelly, Donta Smith, Clarence Matthews, Kevin Young, Evan Brock, Jack Michael Martinez, Brown Ernest. Head coach: Nestor Salazar (Cocodrilos de Caracas)

== Three-Point Shoot Contest ==
Year	Player	Team
2000	(United States) Marcus Wilson	
2005	(Venezuela) Diego Guevara	Guaros de Lara
2010	(United States) David Reichel	Marinos de Anzoategui
2013	(United States) Robert Hornsby	Bucaneros de La Guaira
2014	(Venezuela) Leonardo Cappare	Toros de Aragua
2016	(Venezuela) Leonardo Cappare	Toros de Aragua

== Slam-Dunk winners ==
Year	Player	Team
2000	(United States) Alvin Sims	Toros de Aragua
2004	(Venezuela) Gregory Vallenilla	Panteras de Miranda
2005	(United States) Randy Holcomb	Cocodrilos de Caracas
2010	(United States) Evan Brock	Guaiqueríes de Margarita
2013	(United States) Micah Downs	Bucaneros de La Guaira
2014	(Venezuela) Darwin Matos	Guaros de Lara
2015	(Venezuela) Darwin Matos	Guaros de Lara
2016	(United States) Tony Mitchell	Cocodrilos de Caracas

== Skills contest ==
Year	Player	Team
2004	(United States) Dan Cross	Panteras de Miranda
2010	(Venezuela) Gregory Vargas	Marinos de Anzoategui

== Topscorers ==
Year	Player	Points	Team
2000	(Venezuela) Richard Lugo	31	Panteras de Miranda
2001	(United States) Ronnie Thompkins	33	Panteras de Miranda
2002			
2004	(Venezuela) Victor David Diaz	40	Panteras de Miranda
2005	(Venezuela) Victor David Diaz	27	Cocodrilos de Caracas
2007	(Venezuela) Rafael Guevara	24	Cocodrilos de Caracas
2009	(United States) Carl Elliott	23	Cocodrilos de Caracas
2010	(United States) Luis Bethelmy	31	Cocodrilos de Caracas
2012	(United States) Darius Adams	29	Guaiqueries de Margarita
2013	(United States) (Venezuela) Leon Rodgers	35	Marinos B.B.C.
2014	(United States) Aaron Harper	27	Marinos de Anzoategui
2015	(United States) Marcus Elliott	20	Marinos de Anzoategui
2016	(United States) Robert Glenn	28	Trotamundos de Carabobo

== Players with most selections (2000-2016) ==
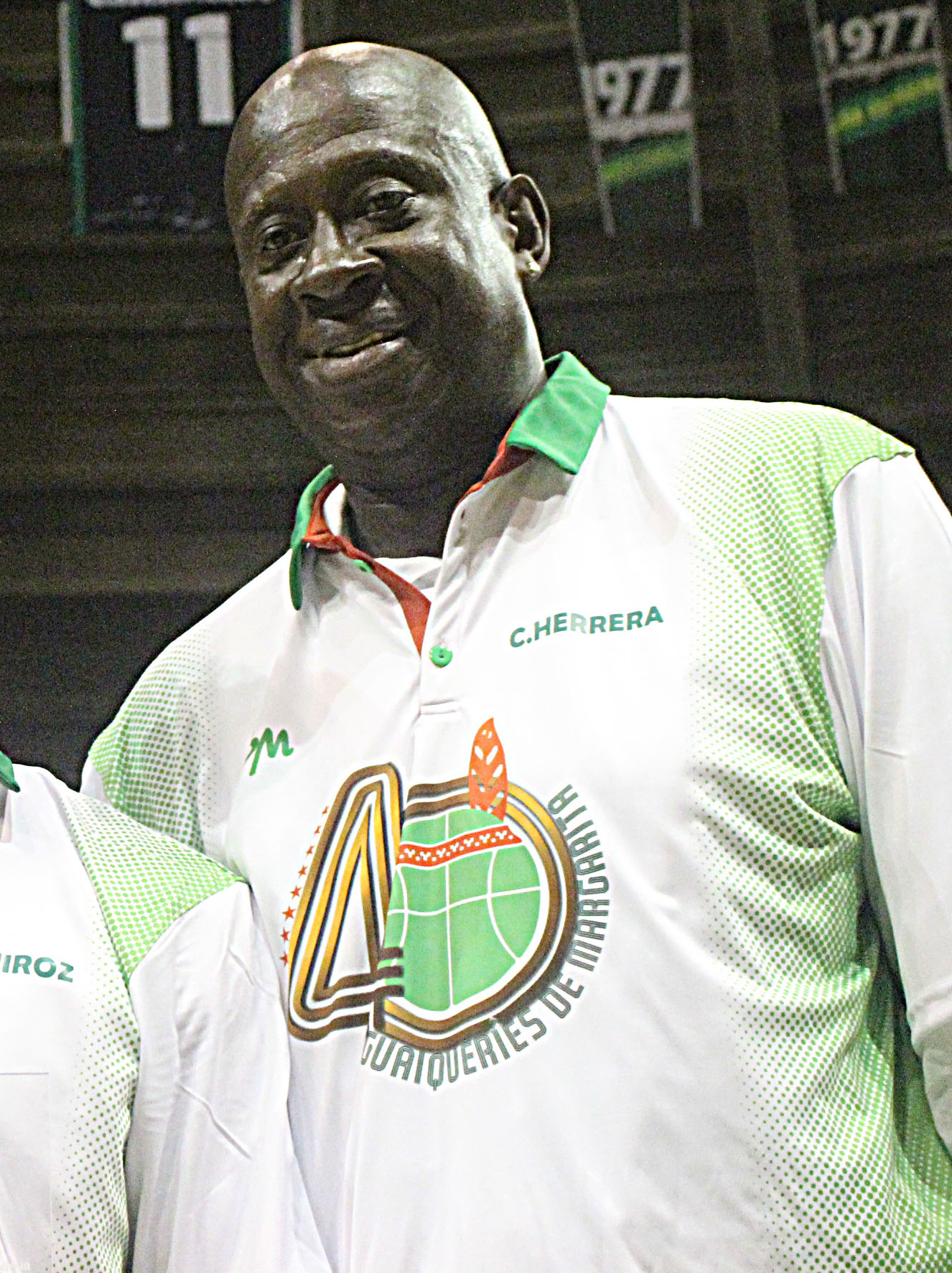
Former NBA player Carl Herrera featured in the 2000 All-Star Game.

Victor David Diaz is the only ever player to receive four MVP awards: in 1997, 2004, 2006 and 2007.

Player	All-Star	Editions	Notes
(Venezuela) Victor David Diaz	5	2001, 2004, 2005, 2006, 2009	4x MVP
(United States) Ruben Nembhard	5	2000, 2001, 2004, 2009, 2010	
(Venezuela) Richard Lugo	5	2000-2002, 2009, 2010	1x MVP (2002)

== LEB All-Star Game results ==
Bold: Team that won the game.

Season	Date	Venue	Team 1	Score	Team 2
2010	21 April 2010	Ginasio Jose Beracas, Caracas	**Eastern Conference**	**114**-93	Western Conference
2011	6 May 2011	Forum de Valencia	**Eastern Conference**	**112**-102	Western Conference
2012	15 April 2012	El Limon Colisseum, Maracay	Eastern Conference		Western Conference

== See also ==
- Superliga Profesional de Baloncesto
