= 2017 Liga Profesional de Baloncesto season =

Venezuelan basketball competition

- Season: 2017
- Dates: 24 February 2017–5 July 2017
- Games played: 219
- Teams: 10
- TV partner(s): DirecTV, TLT, Promar TV

Regular season
- Season MVP: (United States) Carlos Powell

Finals
- Champions: Guaros de Lara (1st title)
- Runners-up: Marinos

Awards
- Grand final MVP: (United States) Nate Robinson

The 2017 Liga Profesional de Baloncesto (LPB) season was the 44th season of the highest basketball division in Venezuela. Guaros de Lara won its first title after defeating Marinos in the Finals.

== Teams ==
=== Venues and locations ===
Club	City	Arena	Capacity
Cocodrilos de Caracas	Caracas	Gimnasio José Beracasa	6,100
Gaiteros del Zulia	Maracaibo	Gimnasio Pedro Elías Belisario Aponte	4,500
Guaros de Lara	Barquisimeto	Domo Bolivariano	10,000
Toros de Aragua	Maracay	Gimnasio Rafael Romero Bolívar	4,200
Trotamundos	Valencia	Forum de Valencia	10,000
Bucaneros de La Guaira	La Guaira	Domo José María Vargas	8,000
Gigantes de Guayana	Ciudad Guayana	Gimnasio Hermanas González	2,500
Guaiqueríes de Margarita	La Asunción	Gimnasio Ciudad de La Asunción	8,500
Marinos	Puerto La Cruz	Gimnasio Luis Ramos	6,000
Panteras de Miranda	Caracas	Gimnasio José Joaquín Papá Carrillo	3,500

== Regular season ==
=== Western Conference ===
Pos	Team	Pld	W	L	PF	PA	PD	Qualification or relegation
1	Cocodrilos Caracas	36	25	11	2863	2750	+113	Qualification to conference semi-finals
2	Guaros de Lara	36	24	12	3229	3012	+217	Qualification to conference semi-finals
3	Trotamundos	36	22	14	2926	2825	+101	Qualification to conference semi-finals
4	Toros de Aragua	36	12	24	2974	3178	−204	Qualification to conference semi-finals
5	Gaiteros del Zulia	36	7	29	2661	3013	−352	

Source: LPB

=== Eastern Conference ===
Pos	Team	Pld	W	L	PF	PA	PD	Qualification or relegation
1	Guaiqueríes de Margarita	36	23	13	2718	2685	+33	Qualification to conference semi-finals
2	Marinos	36	19	17	3132	3021	+111	Qualification to conference semi-finals
3	Bucaneros La Guaira	36	19	17	2842	2779	+63	Qualification to conference semi-finals
4	Gigantes de Guayana	36	16	20	2974	3178	−204	Qualification to conference semi-finals
5	Panteras de Miranda	36	13	23	3019	3040	−21	

Source: LPB

== Play-offs ==
All rounds were played in a best-of-seven playoff format. The higher seeded team played game one, two, six and seven (if needed) at home.

Conference Semi-finals
1 Cocodrilos Caracas	4
4 Toros de Aragua	3
2 Guaros de Lara	4
3 Trotamundos	1
1 Guaiqueríes de Margarita	4
4 Gigantes de Guayana	2
2 Marinos	4
3 Bucaneros La Guaira	2

Conference Finals
1 Cocodrilos Caracas	0
2 Guaros de Lara	4
1 Guaiqueríes de Margarita	1
2 Marinos	4

Grand Final
Guaros de Lara	4
Marinos	2

== Awards ==
=== Most Valuable Player ===
Winner	Team	Ref
(United States) Carlos Powell	Trotamundos	

=== Grand Final MVP ===
Winner	Team	Ref
(United States) Nate Robinson	Guaros de Lara	

== Attendances ==
#	Basketball club	Average attendance
1	Guaros de Lara	2,285
2	Trotamundos	1,586
3	Los Guaiqueríes	998
4	Bucaneros de La Guaira	872
5	Marinos BBC	689
6	Cocodrilos de Caracas	593
7	Gaiteros del Zulia	348
8	Toros de Aragua	241
9	Panteras de Miranda	195
10	Gigantes de Guayana	146
