= Nelson Solórzano =

Venezuelan basketball player and coach

Bucaneros de La Guaira
- Position: Head coach
- League: LPB

Career information
- Playing career: ?–?
- Coaching career: 2002–present

Career history

Playing
- 1980-1981: Cocodrilos de Caracas

Coaching
- 2019-2021: Cocodrilos de Caracas
- 2021-present: Bucaneros de La Guaira

Nelson Abelardo Solórzano Aponte (born 30 May 1959 in Caracas) is a Venezuelan former basketball player and current basketball coach.

== National team career ==
Solórzano competed as a player in the 1992 Summer Olympics with the senior men's Venezuelan national basketball team.

== Coaching career ==
Solórzano has worked as an assistant coach with the senior men's Venezuelan national basketball team. He was an assistant coach with Venezuela at the 2016 Summer Olympics.

He was hired as head coach of the Cocodrilos de Caracas of the Venezuelan Liga Profesional de Baloncesto in 2019. He had previously coached Toros de Aragua, Marinos de Anzoátegui, Panteras de Miranda and Gigantes de Guayana.
