= Liga Profesional de Baloncesto Exemplary Player of the Year =

The Liga Profesional de Baloncesto (LPB) Exemplary Player of the Year is an award presented yearly to the player with the best behavior on and off the court in the Liga Profesional de Baloncesto (LPB) of Venezuela. Since 2012, this recognition has been awarded by a vote of the Technical Commission, whose current members are José Rafael Gómez, Julio Mogollón and Manuel Fuentes. LPB rules mandate that to be eligible for the prize, candidates must have demonstrated irreproachable behavior and must also have played at least 75% of the regular season games.

== Winners ==
Season	Player	Team
2012	(United States) Andrew Feeley	Gigantes de Guayana
2013	(United States) Robert Hornsby	Bucaneros de La Guaira
2014	(United States) Kris Lang	Cocodrilos de Caracas
2015	(United States) Dwayne Jones	Guaiqueríes de Margarita
2015–16	(Venezuela) Dwight Lewis	Trotamundos de Carabobo
