= Trey Gilder =

American basketball player (born 1985)

Personal information
- Born: January 24, 1985 (age 41) Dallas, Texas, U.S.
- Listed height: 6 ft 9 in (2.06 m)
- Listed weight: 185 lb (84 kg)

Career information
- High school: DeSoto (DeSoto, Texas)
- College: McNeese State (2003–2004); Tyler JC (2004–2006); Northwestern State (2006–2008)
- NBA draft: 2008: undrafted
- Playing career: 2008–2022
- Position: Small forward

Career history
- 2008–2009: Colorado 14ers
- 2009: Memphis Grizzlies
- 2009–2010: Maine Red Claws
- 2010: Albuquerque Thunderbirds
- 2010: Zagreb
- 2010–2011: Sydney Kings
- 2012: Sioux Falls Skyforce
- 2012–2014: Trotamundos de Carabobo
- 2012: Cañeros del Este
- 2014: Halcones de Xalapa
- 2015: Austin Spurs
- 2015: Westchester Knicks
- 2015–2018: Panteras de Miranda
- 2018: Cañeros del Este
- 2018: Rafael Barias
- 2018: Hong Kong Eastern
- 2019: Capitanes de Arecibo
- 2019: Guaiqueríes de Margarita
- 2019–2020: Saga Ballooners
- 2021: Indios de Mayagüez
- 2021: Guaiqueríes de Margarita
- 2022: Gigantes de Guayana

Career highlights
- B3 League Scoring Leader (2020); NBA D-League champion (2009); NBA D-League All-Star (2010); First-team All-Southland (2008)
- Stats at NBA.com
- Stats at Basketball Reference

George Larenzo Gilder III (born January 24, 1985) is an American professional basketball player. He played college basketball for McNeese State, Tyler Junior College and Northwestern State.

== High school career ==
Gilder attended DeSoto High School in DeSoto, Texas, where he was a member of the 2003 Texas 5A State Championship winning team.

== College career ==
In 2003–04, Gilder played briefly for McNeese State University before playing for Tyler Junior College from 2004 to 2006.

Gilder played two years at Northwestern State University from 2006 to 2008. He averaged 14.1 points, 4.7 rebounds, 1.5 assists and 1.2 steals per game over his Northwestern State college career. Gilder was named to the 2006–07 Southland Conference All-Tournament Team in his first year with the Demons. He went on to be named to the 2007–08 first-team All-Southland Conference after leading the Demons in points (16.4) and rebounds (6.2) as a senior, finishing ninth in school history in points in a single season (542).

== Professional career ==
=== 2008–09 season ===
After going undrafted in the 2008 NBA draft, Gilder was selected by the Colorado 14ers in the second round of the 2008 NBA Development League Draft on November 7, 2008. He went on to help the 14ers win the 2009 NBA D-League championship as he averaged 13.6 points in 54 games on the season.

=== 2009–10 season ===
In July 2009, Gilder joined the Memphis Grizzlies for the 2009 NBA Summer League and later signed with the team on August 27, 2009. However, he was waived by the Grizzlies on November 5 after appearing in six preseason games and two regular season games. On November 30, he was acquired by the Maine Red Claws. On March 5, 2010, he was traded to the Albuquerque Thunderbirds in exchange for Kurt Looby.

=== 2010–11 season ===
In July 2010, Gilder joined the Orlando Magic for the Orlando Summer League and the Atlanta Hawks for the Las Vegas Summer League. In November 2010, he signed with KK Zagreb of the Croatian A-1 Liga but lasted just two games for parting ways with the club. On December 7, 2010, he signed with the Sydney Kings for the rest of the 2010–11 NBL season. In 20 games for the Kings, he averaged 13.2 points, 5.5 rebounds and 2.2 assists per game.

=== 2011–12 season ===
On December 12, 2011, Gilder signed with the Utah Jazz. However, he was later waived by the Jazz on December 21, 2011. Having held the returning players rights of Gilder following the name change from the New Mexico Thunderbirds, the Canton Charge traded his rights to the Sioux Falls Skyforce on January 3, 2012.

=== 2012 off-season ===
On April 18, 2012, Gilder signed with Trotamundos de Carabobo of Venezuela for the rest of the 2012 LPB season. In July 2012, he joined the Miami Heat for the 2012 NBA Summer League, and the following month, he signed with Cañeros del Este of the Liga Nacional de Baloncesto.

=== 2012–13 season ===
On September 26, 2012, Gilder signed with the Utah Jazz, returning to the franchise for a second stint. However, he was waived again on October 18, 2012, after appearing in two preseason games. In February 2013, he returned to Trotamundos de Carabobo but left the team after two months.

=== 2013–14 season ===
On February 21, 2014, Gilder signed with Halcones de Xalapa of Mexico for the rest of the 2013–14 (LNBP season. He later returned to Trotamundos in May for a third stint.

=== 2014–15 season ===
On January 28, 2015, Gilder was acquired by the Austin Spurs. On February 17, he was traded to the Westchester Knicks in exchange for the returning player rights of Richard Howell.

Shot the 3 that clinched the championship in the Dominican Republic in 2018.

MVP of the year 2018 Venezuela.

=== 2015–16 season ===
On December 20, 2015, Gilder signed with Panteras de Miranda of the Venezuelan League.

=== 2017–18 season ===
In March 2018, Gilder signed with Rafael Barias of the Dominican Torneo de Baloncesto Superior (TBS), making his debut on March 21 in an 80–78 win over Huellas del Siglo. After the season ended, he re-signed with Panteras de Miranda.

=== 2019–20 season ===
On August 17, 2019, Gilder signed with the Saga Ballooners of the B.League.

== Personal ==
Gilder is the son of Judith Redwine, and he has a brother, Keri.

== Career statistics ==
Legend
GP	Games played	GS	Games started	MPG	Minutes per game
FG%	Field goal percentage	3P%	3-point field goal percentage	FT%	Free throw percentage
RPG	Rebounds per game	APG	Assists per game	SPG	Steals per game
BPG	Blocks per game	PPG	Points per game	**Bold**	Career high

=== NBA ===
==== Regular season ====
Year	Team	GP	GS	MPG	FG%	3P%	FT%	RPG	APG	SPG	BPG	PPG
2009–10	Memphis	2	0	2.5	1.000	–	–	.5	.0	.5	.0	1.0
