= Jordan Hamilton (basketball) =

American basketball player (born 1990)

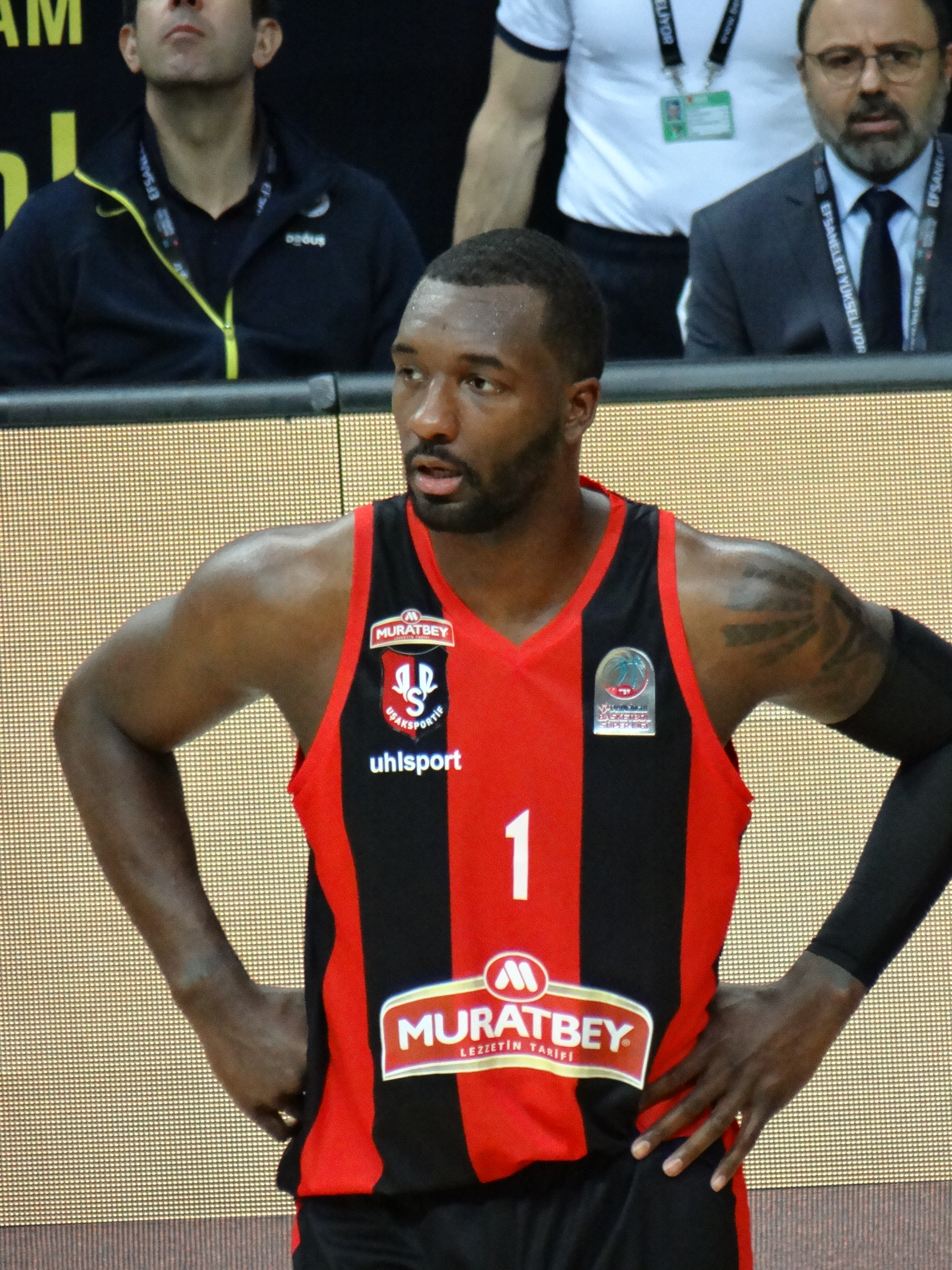
- Hamilton with Uşak Sportif in 2017

No. 5 – Saitama Broncos
- Position: Small forward
- League: B.League

Personal information
- Born: October 6, 1990 (age 36) Los Angeles, California, U.S.
- Listed height: 6 ft 7 in (2.01 m)
- Listed weight: 220 lb (100 kg)

Career information
- High school: Susan Miller Dorsey (Los Angeles, California); Manuel Dominguez (Compton, California)
- College: Texas (2009–2011)
- NBA draft: 2011: 1st round, 26th overall pick
- Drafted by: Dallas Mavericks
- Playing career: 2011–present

Career history
- 2011–2014: Denver Nuggets
- 2012: →Idaho Stampede
- 2014: Houston Rockets
- 2014: Iowa Energy
- 2014–2015: Reno Bighorns
- 2015: Los Angeles Clippers
- 2015: Krasny Oktyabr
- 2016: Rio Grande Valley Vipers
- 2016: New Orleans Pelicans
- 2016: Bucaneros de La Guaira
- 2016: Tofaş
- 2016–2017: Guaros de Lara
- 2017: Metros de Santiago
- 2017–2018: Uşak Sportif
- 2018: Hapoel Holon
- 2018–2019: Basket Brescia Leonessa
- 2019: Metros de Santiago
- 2019–2020: Hapoel Tel Aviv
- 2020–2021: Shiga Lakestars
- 2021–2022: Kumamoto Volters
- 2022–2023: Shiga Lakes
- 2023: →Nishinomiya Storks
- 2023–2024: Aomori Wat's
- 2024: Cocodrilos de Caracas
- 2024: Taipei Fubon Braves
- 2025–2026: Al-Difaa Al-Jawi
- 2026: Piratas de La Guaira
- 2026–present: Saitama Broncos

Career highlights
- FIBA South American Basketball League champion (2017); Dominican Republic Basketball League champion (2017); All-Dominican Republic Basketball League Second Team (2017); Venezuelan Basketball League champion (2017); NBA D-League All-Star (2015); Consensus second-team All-American (2011); First-team All-Big 12 (2011)
- Stats at NBA.com
- Stats at Basketball Reference

Jordan Christian Hamilton (born October 6, 1990) is an American professional basketball player for the Saitama Broncos of the B.League. He played college basketball for the University of Texas.

== High school career ==
Hamilton began his high school career at Susan Miller Dorsey High School where he averaged 26 points, eight rebounds and seven assists per game as a sophomore. After three years at Dorsey, he transferred to Manuel Dominguez High School, playing under Russell Otis. As a junior, he averaged 27.6 points and 11.1 rebounds per game while leading Dominguez to a 32–3 mark and the CIF Southern Section Division I-AA championship. Considered a five-star recruit by Rivals.com, Hamilton was listed as the No. 1 small forward and the No. 6 player in the nation in 2009.

== College career ==
Hamilton played for the University of Texas where, as a sophomore, he was selected in the second team All-America by the USBWA and the fourth team All-America by Fox Sports after posting averages of 18.6 points and 7.7 rebounds per game. In 70 games for the Longhorns, he averaged 14.5 points, 5.7 rebounds and 1.8 assists per game.

== Professional career ==
=== Denver Nuggets (2011–2014) ===
Hamilton was selected with the 26th overall pick in the 2011 NBA draft by the Dallas Mavericks. His draft rights were later traded to the Denver Nuggets on draft night. On December 9, 2011, he signed with the Nuggets. On January 3, 2012, he was assigned to the Idaho Stampede. Four days later, he made his professional debut in a 116–112 loss to the Bakersfield Jam, recording 14 points and 10 rebounds. On January 15, he was recalled by the Nuggets. Ten days later, he made his debut for the Nuggets in a 122–93 win over the Sacramento Kings, recording two points and three rebounds in five minutes off the bench. In three seasons, he averaged 5.6 points, 2.8 rebounds and 0.7 assists per game.

=== Houston Rockets (2014) ===
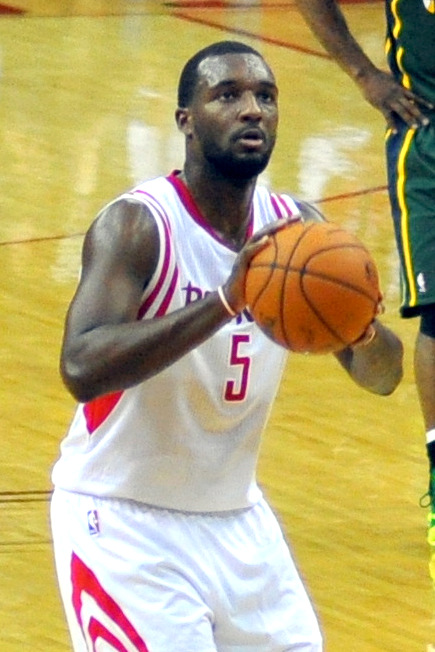
Hamilton with the Rockets in 2014

On February 20, 2014, Hamilton was traded to the Houston Rockets in exchange for Aaron Brooks. Five days later, he made his debut for the Rockets in a 129–103 win over the Sacramento Kings, recording 12 points, five rebounds, two assists, one steal and one block in 24 minutes off the bench. In 21 games, he averaged 6.6 points, 2.9 rebounds and 0.9 assists per game.

=== Iowa Energy / Reno Bighorns (2014–2015) ===
On August 18, 2014, Hamilton signed with the Toronto Raptors. However, he was later waived by the Raptors on October 25. Two days later, he was claimed off waivers by the Utah Jazz. On November 6, he was waived by the Jazz before appearing in a game for them.

On November 26, 2014, Hamilton was acquired by the Iowa Energy of the NBA Development League. Three days later, he made his debut for Iowa in a 102–97 loss to the Grand Rapids Drive, recording 11 points, three rebounds, two assists and one steal in 18 minutes off the bench.

On December 10, 2014, Hamilton was traded, along with a 2015 second-round pick, to the Reno Bighorns in exchange for a 2015 first-round pick. Two days later, he made his debut for the Bighorns in a 133–122 win over the Idaho Stampede, recording 11 points, three rebounds, one assist, one steal and two blocks in 21 minutes off the bench. On February 4, 2015, he was named to the Futures All-Star team for the 2015 NBA D-League All-Star Game.

=== Los Angeles Clippers (2015) ===
On February 24, 2015, Hamilton signed a 10-day contract with the Los Angeles Clippers. Three days later, he made his debut for the Clippers in a 97–79 win over the Memphis Grizzlies. On March 6, 2015, he signed a second 10-day contract with the Clippers. On March 20, he signed with the Clippers for the remainder of the season. On August 1, he was waived by the Clippers. In 14 games, he averaged 2.7 points, 1.1 rebounds and 0.5 assists per game.

=== Krasny Oktyabr (2015) ===
On August 22, 2015, Hamilton signed with Krasny Oktyabr of Russia for the 2015–16 season. On November 23, he parted ways with the club. In 6 Eurocup games, he averaged 12.2 points, 7.7 rebounds and 1.5 assists per game.

=== Rio Grande Valley Vipers (2016) ===
On February 16, 2016, he was acquired by the Rio Grande Valley Vipers. That night, he made his debut for the Vipers in a 101–96 win over the Austin Spurs, recording eight points, six rebounds, four assists and two blocks in 24 minutes.

=== New Orleans Pelicans (2016) ===
On March 25, 2016, Hamilton signed a 10-day contract with the New Orleans Pelicans to help the team deal with numerous injuries. New Orleans had to use an NBA hardship exemption in order to sign him as he made their roster stand at 17, two over the allowed limited of 15. The next day, he made his debut in a 115–91 loss to the Toronto Raptors, recording 11 points, four rebounds and three assists in 24 minutes off the bench. On April 4, Hamilton signed with the Pelicans for the rest of the season.

=== Bucaneros de La Guaira (2016) ===
On April 27, 2016, Hamilton signed with the Bucaneros de La Guaira of the Liga Profesional de Baloncesto. Two days later, he made his debut for La Guaira in an 81–77 win over the Marinos de Anzoátegui, recording 10 points, five rebounds, 12 assists and one steal in 38 minutes.

=== Tofaş (2016) ===
On July 25, 2016, Hamilton signed with Tofaş of the Turkish Basketball Super League. After only one game, Hamilton left Tofaş.

=== Guaros de Lara (2016–2017) ===
On October 23, 2016, Hamilton signed with Guaros de Lara of the Venezuelan League.

=== Uşak Sportif (2017–2018) ===
On June 17, 2017, Hamilton signed with Turkish club Uşak Sportif. Hamilton played 24 games for Uşak and averaged 13.5 points, 6.8 rebounds and 2.3 assists per game.

=== Hapoel Holon (2018) ===
On April 16, 2018, Hamilton parted ways with Uşak to join the Israeli team Hapoel Holon for the rest of the season, signing as a replacement for Glen Rice Jr. On May 30, 2018, Hamilton recorded a season-high 28 points, shooting 11-of-20 from the field, along with six rebounds and two steals in an 89–83 playoff win over Hapoel Eilat.

Hamilton helped Holon reach the Israeli League Final Four, where they eventually lost to Maccabi Tel Aviv in the Finals. In 16 games played for Holon, he averaged 17.7 points, 7.5 rebounds, 2.4 assists and 1.2 steals per game, while shooting 43.6 percent from three-point range.

=== Brescia (2018–2019) ===
On July 12, 2018, Hamilton signed a one-year deal with the Italian team Basket Brescia Leonessa. On March 24, 2019, Hamilton recorded a season-high 33 points, while shooting a career-high 11-of-16 from three-point range, along with five rebounds and three assists in a 91–89 win over Fiat Torino. In 39 games played for Brescia during the 2018–19 season (including the Italian League and the EuroCup), he averaged 13.9 points, 6.3 rebounds and 2.6 assists per game.

=== Hapoel Tel Aviv (2019–2020) ===
On October 23, 2019, Hamilton returned to Israel for a second stint, signing with Hapoel Tel Aviv for the 2019–20 season. On January 6, 2020, Hamilton recorded a season-high 27 points, while shooting 7-of-11 from three-point shot, along with eight rebounds and six assists in a 100–93 win over Maccabi Ashdod. He was subsequently named Israeli League Round 14 MVP.

=== Shiga Lakestars (2020–2021) ===
Prior to the 2020–21 season, Hamilton signed with the Shiga Lakestars of the Japanese B.League.

=== Kumamoto Volters (2021–2022) ===
On June 2, 2021, Hamilton signed with the Kumamoto Volters.

== The Basketball Tournament ==
Jordan Hamilton played for Team Challenge ALS in the 2018 edition of The Basketball Tournament. In four games, he averaged 14.3 points per game and 9.8 rebounds per game on 47 percent shooting. Team Challenge ALS made it to the West Regional Championship Game before falling to eventual tournament runner-up Eberlein Drive.

== NBA career statistics ==
Legend
| GP | Games played | GS | Games started | MPG | Minutes per game |
| FG% | Field goal percentage | 3P% | 3-point field goal percentage | FT% | Free throw percentage |
| RPG | Rebounds per game | APG | Assists per game | SPG | Steals per game |
| BPG | Blocks per game | PPG | Points per game | **Bold** | Career high |

=== Regular season ===
| Year | Team | GP | GS | MPG | FG% | 3P% | FT% | RPG | APG | SPG | BPG | PPG |
|---|---|---|---|---|---|---|---|---|---|---|---|---|
| 2011–12 | Denver | 26 | 2 | 9.9 | **.432** | .362 | .400 | 2.4 | .8 | .2 | .1 | 4.4 |
| 2012–13 | Denver | **40** | 1 | 9.9 | .418 | .370 | .500 | 2.4 | .6 | .4 | .2 | 5.2 |
| 2013–14 | Denver | 39 | **11** | 17.2 | .390 | .349 | .742 | 3.4 | .9 | .8 | **.3** | 6.8 |
| 2013–14 | Houston | 21 | 1 | 16.6 | .393 | .362 | **.850** | 2.9 | .9 | .6 | **.3** | 6.6 |
| 2014–15 | L.A. Clippers | 14 | 2 | 8.7 | .400 | **.476** | .000 | 1.1 | .5 | .1 | .0 | 2.7 |
| 2015–16 | New Orleans | 11 | 4 | **27.6** | .422 | .289 | .667 | **5.6** | **2.3** | **.7** | **.3** | **11.4** |
| Career | | 151 | 21 | 13.9 | .408 | .357 | .670 | 2.8 | .8 | .5 | .2 | 5.9 |

=== Playoffs ===
| Year | Team | GP | GS | MPG | FG% | 3P% | FT% | RPG | APG | SPG | BPG | PPG |
|---|---|---|---|---|---|---|---|---|---|---|---|---|
| 2012 | Denver | **2** | 0 | **2.5** | **.667** | .000 | .000 | .0 | .0 | **.5** | .0 | **2.0** |
| 2013 | Denver | 1 | 0 | 2.0 | .000 | .000 | .000 | .0 | .0 | .0 | .0 | .0 |
| Career | | 3 | 0 | 2.3 | .500 | .000 | .000 | .0 | .0 | .3 | .0 | 1.3 |

== Personal life ==
Hamilton is the son of Greg and Karen and has five siblings. His younger brother, Isaac, played college basketball for UCLA. Hamilton is married to New York Liberty player and 2021 WNBA All-Star Betnijah Laney. The couple married in November 2021.
