= Iván Déniz =

Spanish basketball coach

Astros de Jalisco
- Position: Head coach
- League: CIBACOPA

Personal information
- Born: 21 May 1973 (age 53) Santa Cruz de Tenerife, Spain
- Coaching career: 2003–present

Career history

Coaching
- 2003–2004: Tenerife CB
- 2004–2005: UCAM Murcia CB
- 2005–2006: CB Plasencia Ambroz
- 2007–2009: Soles de Mexicali
- 2009–2010: Tenerife CB
- 2010–2011: Halcones de Xalapa
- 2010–2011: Trotamundos de Carabobo
- 2011–2013: Soles de Mexicali
- 2013–2014: Atléticos de San Germán
- 2014: Marinos B.B.C.
- 2014–2016: Soles de Mexicali
- 2016: Guaros de Lara
- 2017: Piratas de La Guaira
- 2018: Mexico
- 2018–2022: Soles de Mexicali
- 2022: Rayos de Hermosillo
- 2023: Libertadores de Querétaro
- 2025–: Astros de Jalisco

Iván Eduardo Déniz O'Donnell (born 21 May 1973) is a Spanish basketball coach. He is the head coach of the Astros de Jalisco.

== Coaching career ==
Déniz grew up in sports under the guidance of José Carlos Hernández Rizo and Paco García on the Tenerife CB's bench. It was precisely after García's dismissal in the 2003/04 season when he got his first big opportunity, taking the reins of the team and coaching the last games of the ACB (since March 4). It was a good season in which the team tied for the last playoff spot but was eliminated after losing the final game. His next opportunity as a head coach came with UCAM Murcia CB in the LEB league, and then CB Plasencia in LEB-2 would be his next destination (he replaced Dani García on the Plasencia bench during the final stretch of the previous LEB-1 season, failing to maintain their position but continuing the next season). However, in June 2007, Déniz surprised with an unusual signing by the Soles de Mexicali, a team that hired him for one season with an option for an additional year. In his first year, Déniz adapted quickly and achieved the runner-up spot in the Americas championship, renewing his contract for one more year. In the second season, he repeated success and won the North Conference championship for the third consecutive year. In the 2009/10 season, he returned to Spain to coach the Tenerife Basketball Club in the LEB league. After the season, he signed a two-month contract with Trotamundos de Carabobo in Venezuela. In 2010, he joined Trotamundos de Carabobo, where he was named Coach of the Year in the LPB, the top basketball league in Venezuela. However, in the following season, things didn't go as well, and after only three wins in the first eight games of the regular season, he was dismissed. In 2011, he returned to Mexico to coach the Soles de Mexicali, a club he knew well and where he had already made an impact. That same year, he was selected as Coach of the Year in the Venezuelan Professional Basketball League after coaching Trotamundos de Carabobo. At the end of 2012, the Atléticos de San Germán from Puerto Rico confirmed that Déniz would be their head coach starting in March 2013. In 2014, he won the championship in the Venezuelan Professional Basketball League with Marinos de Anzoátegui and also won the championship in the Mexican Professional Basketball League with Soles de Mexicali, being named Coach of the Year. In the 2015–16 season, with Soles de Mexicali, he set a franchise record of 37 wins and 4 losses in the regular season and reached the Championship Final again, but lost in the seventh game due to a controversial league decision, which took away the second game previously won. This event led to the dismissal of the league president. In the same season, he again coached the All-Star Game of the league, leading the national players' team. Currently, he reached a contractual agreement to coach the Venezuelan team Guaros de Lara in the 2016 season of the Professional Basketball League (LPB). His first challenge as coach of this club would be none other than the FIBA Intercontinental Cup final, scheduled for September 18, 2016, where he would face the Fraport Skyliners of Frankfurt. The winner of this single game would claim the international championship. In 2016, Déniz won the FIBA Intercontinental Cup in Frankfurt (Germany), defeating the German Skyliners. In 2017, he returned to Soles de Mexicali, where in April 2018, he won the LNBP championship and was considered Coach of the Year. In 2018, he was named the men's head coach of Mexico and took charge of the qualification for the China World Cup. In 2023, he joined Libertadores de Querétaro. In 2025, he signed as new coach of Astros de Jalisco.
