= César Portillo =

Venezuelan basketball player

Personal information
- Born: September 26, 1968 Barcelona, Venezuela
- Listed height: 6 ft 9 in (2.06 m)

Career information
- High school: Miami Senior (Miami, Florida)
- College: Florida (1988–1989); Palm Beach JC (1989–1990); South Alabama (1990–1992)
- NBA draft: 1992: undrafted
- Playing career: 1992–2002
- Position: Center

Career history
- 1989–1991: Marinos de Oriente
- 1992: Cáceres CB
- 1992–1994: Marinos de Oriente
- 1994: Franca
- 1996–1998: Marinos de Oriente
- 1998–1999: Cocodrilos de Caracas
- 1999–2002: Gaiteros del Zulia

Career highlights
- Second-team Parade All-American (1988); Fourth-team Parade All-American (1987)

César Eduardo Portillo Brown (born September 26, 1968 in Barcelona, Anzoátegui) is a retired male basketball player (2.06 metres) from Venezuela, who played as a center during his career.

== High school and college ==
Portillo attended high school in the United States at Miami High School in Miami, Florida. There, Portillo led Miami High to a state title, with teammate and future NBA player Doug Edwards. Portillo was named a Parade All-American as a senior.

After his standout high school career, César Portillo committed to the University of Florida. His time there was cut short after only four games as his Scholastic Aptitude Test (SAT) came into question and he was asked to re-take the test. Instead, Portillo transferred to Palm Beach Community College to play.

Following a junior college season where he averaged 19.5 points, 9.9 rebounds and 3.2 blocks per game, Portillo signed with the University of South Alabama. Portillo played two years for South Alabama, leading them to the NCAA tournament as a junior.

== International career ==
Portillo's first international experience came as a 14-year-old guard as he was a part of Venezuela's entry to the 1983 Pan American Games. He later competed for the Venezuela national basketball team in his familiar post position at the 1989 Campeonato Sudamericano (4th place) and at the 1990 FIBA World Championship, where the team finished in 11th place.
