= Carl Herrera =

Venezuelan basketball player (born 1966)

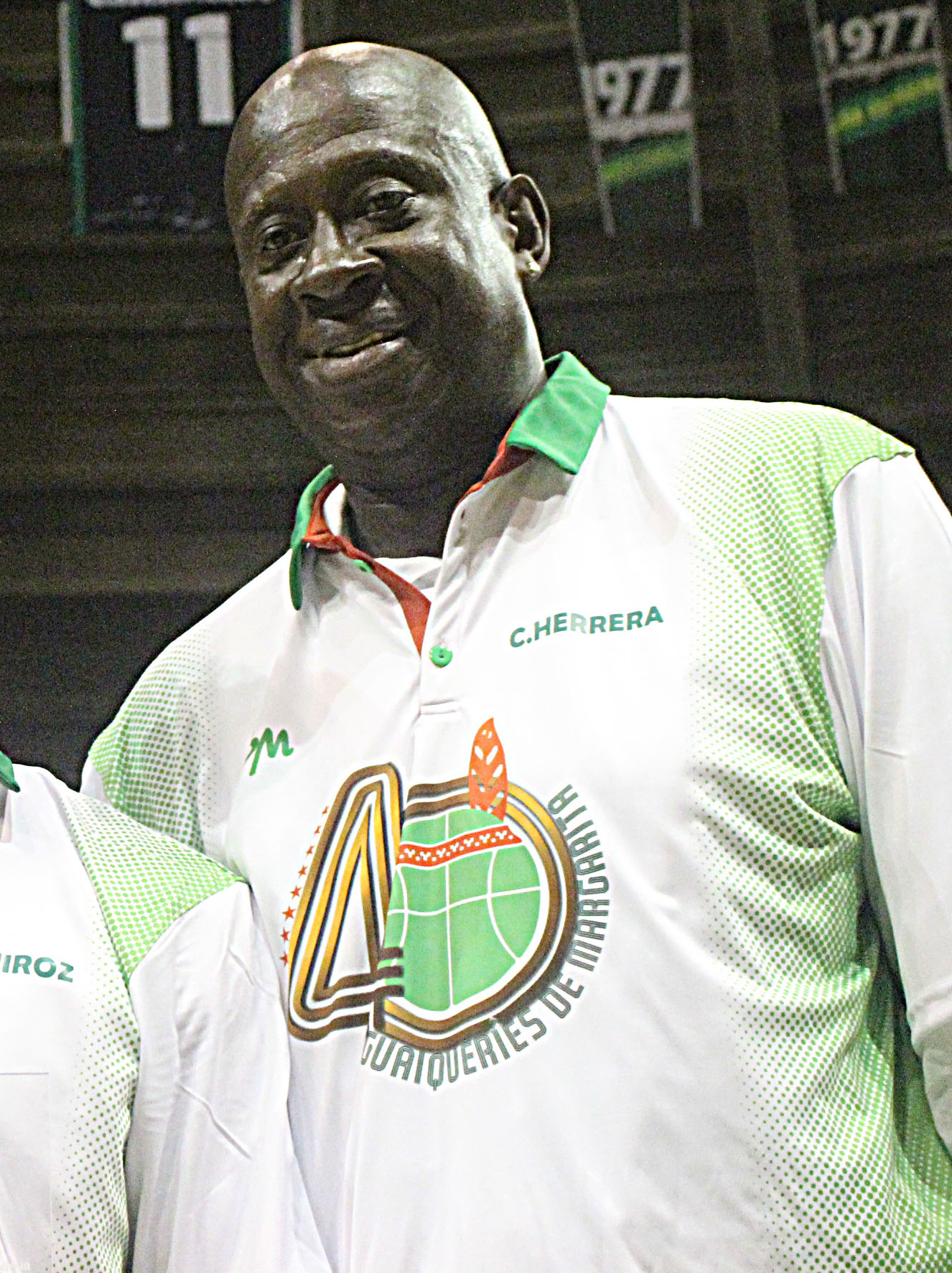

Personal information
- Born: December 14, 1966 (age 59) Canaan, Trinidad and Tobago
- Listed height: 6 ft 9 in (2.06 m)
- Listed weight: 215 lb (98 kg)

Career information
- College: Jacksonville College (1987–1989); Houston (1989–1990)
- NBA draft: 1990: 2nd round, 30th overall pick
- Drafted by: Miami Heat
- Playing career: 1990–2008
- Position: Power forward
- Number: 7, 11, 14, 21

Career history
- 1990–1991: Real Madrid
- 1991–1995: Houston Rockets
- 1995–1998: San Antonio Spurs
- 1998–1999: Vancouver Grizzlies
- 1999: Denver Nuggets
- 1999–2001: Bravos de Portuguesa
- 2001: Trotamundos de Carabobo
- 2001: Delfines de Miranda
- 2001: Cocodrilos de Caracas
- 2002: Trotamundos de Carabobo
- 2002–2004: Guaiqueríes de Margarita
- 2004–2007: Guaros de Lara
- 2007–2008: Deportivo Tachira

Career highlights
- 2× NBA champion (1994, 1995); First-team All-SWC (1990)

Career NBA statistics
- Points: 2,481 (5.3 ppg)
- Rebounds: 1,690 (3.6 rpg)
- Blocks: 204 (0.4 bpg)
- Stats at NBA.com
- Stats at Basketball Reference
Medals
Men's basketball
Representing Venezuela
South American Basketball Championship
Gold medal – first place	1991 Valencia	Venezuela national team
Bronze medal – third place	1999 Bahia Blanca	Venezuela national team
Bronze medal – third place	2001 Valdivia	Venezuela national team

Carl Víctor Herrera Alleyne (born December 14, 1966), nicknamed "Amigo", is a retired Trinidadian-born Venezuelan basketball player. A power forward, he was part of the Houston Rockets' National Basketball Association (NBA) championship teams of the mid-1990s. He was the first Venezuelan to ever play in the NBA.

== Basketball career ==
Born in Trinidad and Tobago, Herrera grew up playing basketball at colegio Simón Bolívar in San José, a suburb of Venezuela's capital Caracas. From the age of 16 he played in Venezuela's top flight for the Bravos de Portuguesa. In 1984, he was named Rookie of the Year in the LPB league. At the age of 19, he set league records by pulling down 34 rebounds in a single game and blocking 13 shots in another.

He attended Jacksonville Junior College in Texas and the University of Houston, before being selected by the Miami Heat with the 30th pick in the 1990 NBA draft. He spent his first professional season in Spain, with Real Madrid. Partnering with another future NBA player, Stanley Roberts, he helped the Liga ACB club to the Korać Cup final in his only season.

Herrera began his professional career in the United States in 1991 with the Houston Rockets, where he played until 1995, when the Rockets swept the Orlando Magic in four games to win their second straight NBA Championship. During the regular season of the two successful seasons combined, he averaged six points and four rebounds in roughly 20 minutes of play. While with the Rockets, Herrera was given the nickname "Amigo".

Afterwards, Herrera spent three seasons with the San Antonio Spurs, before splitting the final year of his NBA career, the lockout-shortened 1999 season, with the Vancouver Grizzlies and the Denver Nuggets.

After wrapping up his NBA career, he rejoined the Venezuelan basketball league, where he began playing at the age of 16. Herrera was also a long-time member of the Venezuela national team. He participated in the 1992 Olympic Games, as well as in the World Championships 1990 and 2002. In 1991, he won the South America Championship with Venezuela.

Herrera later became a coach with Estudiantes de Guárico and Gigantes de Guayana.

In December 2014, he was wounded during a shooting at Margarita Island, which was described as an "apparent robbery attempt". Herrera was taken into intensive care.
