= James Ennis III =

American basketball player (born 1990)

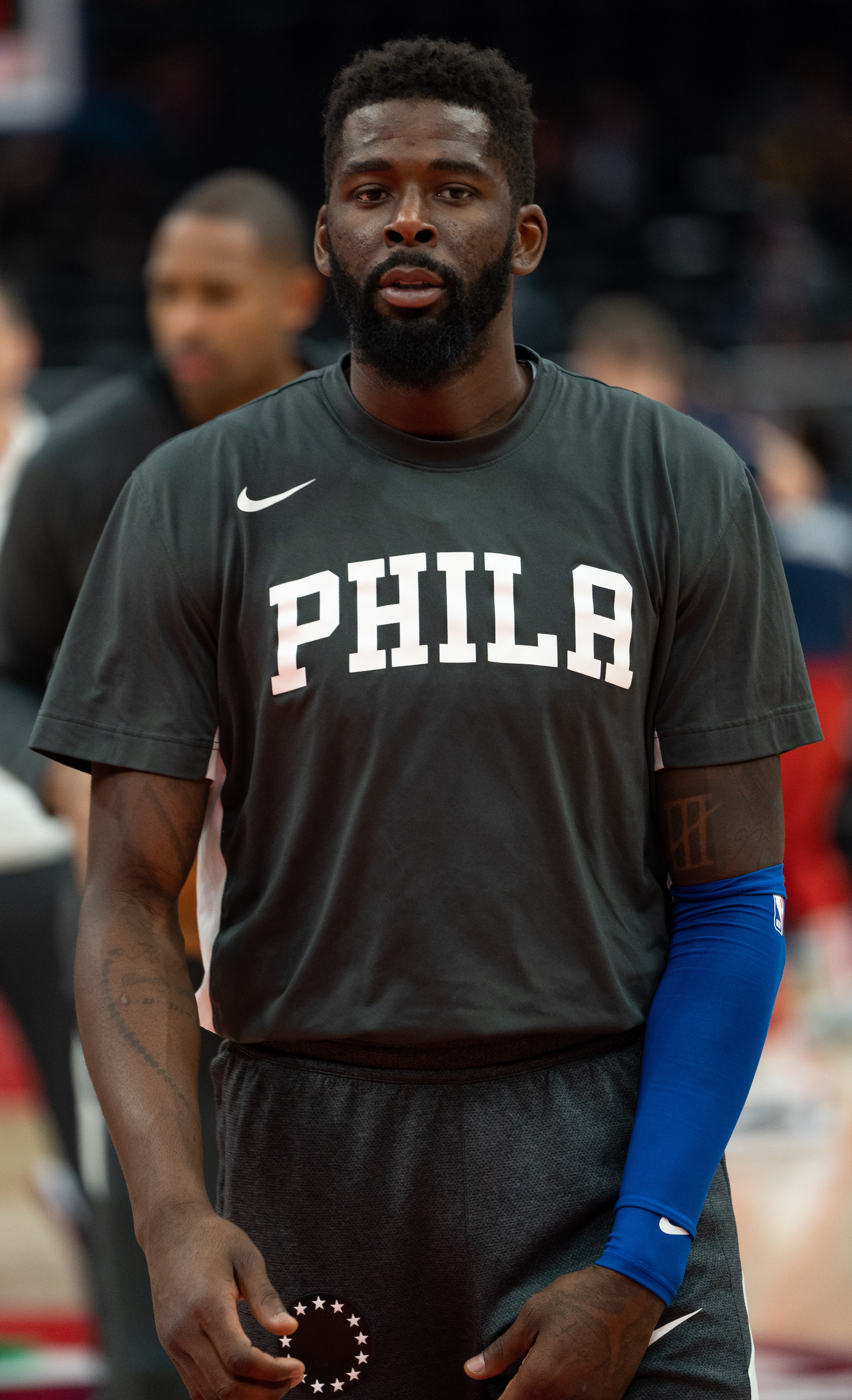
- Ennis with the Philadelphia 76ers in 2019

Free agent
- Position: Small forward

Personal information
- Born: July 1, 1990 (age 36) Ventura, California, U.S.
- Listed height: 198 cm (6 ft 6 in)
- Listed weight: 105 kg (231 lb)

Career information
- High school: Ventura (Ventura, California)
- College: Oxnard (2009–2010); Ventura (2010–2011); Long Beach State (2011–2013)
- NBA draft: 2013: 2nd round, 50th overall pick
- Drafted by: Atlanta Hawks
- Playing career: 2013–present

Career history
- 2013–2014: Perth Wildcats
- 2014: Piratas de Quebradillas
- 2014–2015: Miami Heat
- 2015–2016: Memphis Grizzlies
- 2015–2016: →Iowa Energy
- 2016: Iowa Energy
- 2016: New Orleans Pelicans
- 2016–2018: Memphis Grizzlies
- 2018: Detroit Pistons
- 2018–2019: Houston Rockets
- 2019–2020: Philadelphia 76ers
- 2020–2021: Orlando Magic
- 2021: Brooklyn Nets
- 2021–2022: Los Angeles Clippers
- 2022: Denver Nuggets
- 2022: Hapoel Haifa
- 2022–2023: BC Samara
- 2023: Grises de Humacao
- 2023–2024: Shijiazhuang Xianglan
- 2023–2024: Al-Ahli Manama
- 2025: Kagoshima Rebnise
- 2025: Formosa Dreamers
- 2026: Piratas de La Guaira

Career highlights
- NBL champion (2014); All-NBL First Team (2014); AP honorable mention All-American (2013); Big West Player of the Year (2013); First-team All-Big West (2013); 2× First-team All-WSC (2010, 2011)
- Stats at NBA.com
- Stats at Basketball Reference

James Alfred Ennis III (born July 1, 1990) is an American professional basketball player who last played for Piratas de La Guaira of the Superliga Profesional de Baloncesto (SPB). He played two years of college basketball for the Long Beach State 49ers, where he won the Big West Player of the Year in 2013. After being selected by the Atlanta Hawks in the second round of the 2013 NBA draft, Ennis moved to Australia and helped the Perth Wildcats win the 2014 NBL championship. He debuted in the National Basketball Association (NBA) in 2014 with the Miami Heat and later played for the Memphis Grizzlies, New Orleans Pelicans, Detroit Pistons, Houston Rockets, Philadelphia 76ers, Orlando Magic, Brooklyn Nets, Los Angeles Clippers and Denver Nuggets over eight NBA seasons.

== Early life ==
Born in Ventura, California, Ennis grew up in the Westview Village housing project where he and his five siblings played basketball, soccer, rode bikes and skateboarded. As a youngster, he and his family moved around a lot—Ennis attended three different high schools in his freshman year alone. They later settled back down at Westview Village where he went on to graduate from Ventura High School in 2009.

== College career ==
As a freshman at Oxnard College in 2009–10, Ennis was named first-team All-WSC after averaging 19.0 points, the third most in the state by a freshman, and 7.7 rebounds per game. For his sophomore season, he returned home to play for Ventura College, and in 2010–11, he was named first-team All-California Community College Athletic Association and first-team All-Western State Conference after averaging 20.3 points, 7.8 rebounds, 5.0 assists and 1.6 steals per game. He scored 1,053 points in two seasons of junior college basketball, while scoring in double figures in 48 of his 52 games.

For his junior season, Ennis joined the Long Beach State 49ers, and immediately garnered the starting small forward role. In 2011–12, Ennis earned honorable mention All-Big West Conference honors after averaging 10.0 points, 4.1 rebounds, 2.6 assists and 1.6 steals per game.

With the departure of conference player of the year Casper Ware, Ennis became the go-to player for the 49ers in 2012–13. He responded by averaging 16.5 points and 6.7 rebounds per game while leading the 49ers to another regular-season Big West championship. At the end of the season, Ennis was named Big West Player of the Year and an AP honorable mention All-American.

On April 5, 2013, Ennis scored a team-high 13 points in the Reese's College All-Star Game, leading the East team to an 87–81 win over the West.

== Professional career ==
=== NBA draft ===
On June 27, 2013, Ennis was selected by the Atlanta Hawks with the 50th overall pick in the 2013 NBA draft. His rights were subsequently traded to the Miami Heat on draft night, and he later joined the Heat for the 2013 NBA Summer League. The Heat reportedly wanted Ennis to play for their NBA Development League affiliate team, the Sioux Falls Skyforce, in 2013–14 but were unable to sign him to the NBA minimum salary of US$490,180 due to salary cap restrictions. Consequently, the most Ennis would have earned playing in the D-League was US$25,000, so Ennis made the decision to play overseas in order to support his father, his disabled mother, and his five siblings.

=== Perth Wildcats (2013–2014) ===
On August 10, 2013, Ennis signed with the Perth Wildcats in Australia for the 2013–14 NBL season. In his debut, he recorded 25 points, four rebounds and two assists in an 83–80 win over the Adelaide 36ers. His 25 points marked the most points scored by a Wildcat making their NBL debut. He went on to earn Player of the Month honors for October after averaging a league-leading 24.0 points per game to begin his career. On November 30, 2013, he scored a season-high 33 points in an 85–75 win over the Cairns Taipans.

The Wildcats started the season with eight straight wins before finishing with a league-best 21–7 record. They faced the Wollongong Hawks in the semi-finals, with Ennis scoring 25 points in Game 1 and 20 points in Game 2 to help the Wildcats advance to the NBL Grand Final with 2–0 sweep. In Game 1 of the grand final series against the Adelaide 36ers, Ennis scored a game-high 30 points in a 92–85 win. In Game 2, Ennis endured a quieter-than-usual night, tallying just 14 points before fouling out with 22 seconds left in an 89–84 loss. In Game 3, Ennis' early foul trouble limited him to a season-low nine points as the Wildcats claimed a 93–59 victory to win the championship.

For the season, Ennis finished third in the NBL MVP voting and earned All-NBL First Team honors. He also claimed the Wildcats' Club MVP. He appeared in all 33 games for the Wildcats in 2013–14, averaging 21.2 points, 7.1 rebounds and 2.1 assists per game whilst shooting 46.8% from the field.

=== Piratas de Quebradillas (2014) ===
Following the conclusion of the 2013–14 NBL season, Ennis moved to Puerto Rico to play for Piratas de Quebradillas of the Baloncesto Superior Nacional. In 12 games, he averaged 16.5 points with 8.3 rebounds per game. He returned to the United States in June 2014 to attend various NBA workouts.

=== Miami Heat (2014–2015) ===
On July 15, 2014, Ennis signed a multi-year deal with the Miami Heat. He impressed during the 2014 NBA Summer League, averaging 15.5 points, 5.7 rebounds, 1.5 assists and 1.3 steals in six games.

On October 29, 2014, Ennis made his NBA debut in the Heat's 107–95 season-opening win over the Washington Wizards. With the Heat up by four points with less than nine minutes to go in the fourth quarter, Ennis brought the American Airlines Arena crowd to their feet with a spectacular three-point play, taking off from midway down the paint, elevating over Rasual Butler and throwing down a dunk while getting fouled. He finished the game with five points and two rebounds in 14½ minutes of action off the bench. He went on to record a then season-best game on December 21 with 16 points and 8 rebounds in a 100–84 win over the Boston Celtics.

On March 29, 2015, Ennis tied his season high of 16 points in a 109–102 win over the Detroit Pistons. On April 5, he topped his season high, recording 17 points and 5 rebounds in a loss to the Indiana Pacers. In the Heat's season finale on April 15, Ennis received just his third start of the season with the majority of his teammates sitting out. He played the entire game and finished with 17 points, 12 rebounds and 6 assists in a 105–101 win over the Philadelphia 76ers. The Heat missed the playoffs in 2014–15 with a 37–45 record, good for 10th in the Eastern Conference. Ennis appeared in 62 of the Heat's 82 games during his rookie season, averaging 5.0 points and 2.8 rebounds in 17.0 minutes per game.

With $845,059 guaranteed salary on the line for Ennis coming into the 2015–16 season, he struggled during the 2015 NBA Summer League, calling his play "terrible" after shooting 29.7 percent from the field (19-of-64) in seven games, including 2-of-23 on three-pointers, and recorded more than twice as many turnovers (23) as assists (11). Tendinitis in his knees contributed to his struggles, but with three months between summer league and training camp, Ennis was able to rejuvenate himself while receiving treatment that subsided the tendinitis. He also worked on his jump shot with Heat assistant coach Keith Smart, and focused on improving his ball-handling. Despite sustaining a dislocated finger on his left hand in Miami's exhibition finale against the New Orleans Pelicans, the Heat retained Ennis for the 2015–16 season after earning a spot on the team's opening night roster.

=== Memphis Grizzlies (2015–2016) ===
Ennis managed game time in three of the Heat's first seven games to begin the 2015–16 season, when on November 10, 2015, he and Mario Chalmers were traded to the Memphis Grizzlies in exchange for Jarnell Stokes and Beno Udrih, a deal undertaken in order for the Heat to cut $6 million in luxury tax.

Upon joining the Grizzlies, Ennis was unable to make an impact or string together consecutive games due to the team's strong contingent of wing players in Jeff Green, Matt Barnes, Tony Allen, JaMychal Green and Vince Carter. He subsequently spent the majority of the 2015–16 season in the NBA Development League playing for the Iowa Energy, the Grizzlies' affiliate team. In his debut for the Energy on December 5, he scored a season-high 32 points in a 116–93 win over the Canton Charge. On March 2, 2016, after appearing in just 10 games for Memphis, he was waived by the organization.

=== Iowa Energy (2016) ===
On March 6, 2016, Ennis was acquired by the Iowa Energy. He played for the Energy that afternoon, recording 30 points and 7 rebounds in a 109–104 loss to the Delaware 87ers. On March 16, he recorded his first double-double of the season with 24 points and 10 rebounds in a 106–102 win over the Erie BayHawks. Two days later, he had a season-best game with 30 points, 13 rebounds, 3 assists and 3 steals in a 123–106 win over the Maine Red Claws. Between March 12 and 26, Ennis helped Iowa win six straight games to bring them back into playoff contention. However, a loss to the Sioux Falls Skyforce on March 29 ended their streak, as they were eliminated from the playoff race with two games remaining in the season. In 24 games for Iowa during the 2015–16 season, he averaged 18.8 points, 6.0 rebounds, 2.6 assists and 1.0 steals in 33.4 minutes per game.

=== New Orleans Pelicans (2016) ===
On March 30, 2016, Ennis signed a 10-day contract with the New Orleans Pelicans to help the team deal with numerous injuries. New Orleans had to use an NBA hardship exemption in order to sign him as he made their roster stand at 18, three over the allowed limited of 15. He made his debut for the Pelicans later that night, recording 13 points, 5 rebounds and 4 assists in 24 minutes off the bench in a 100–92 loss to the San Antonio Spurs. On April 6, he made his first start for the Pelicans, scoring 13 points in 29 minutes in a 104–97 loss to the Boston Celtics. On April 9, he signed with the Pelicans for the rest of the season. Later that day, in his seventh game and third start for the Pelicans, Ennis recorded 18 points, 6 rebounds and 3 steals in a 121–100 loss to the Phoenix Suns. On April 11, he scored a career-high 29 points on 9-of-14 shooting in a 121–116 loss to the Chicago Bulls. In the Pelicans' season finale on April 13, Ennis scored 28 points in a 144–109 loss to the Minnesota Timberwolves.

=== Return to Memphis (2016–2018) ===
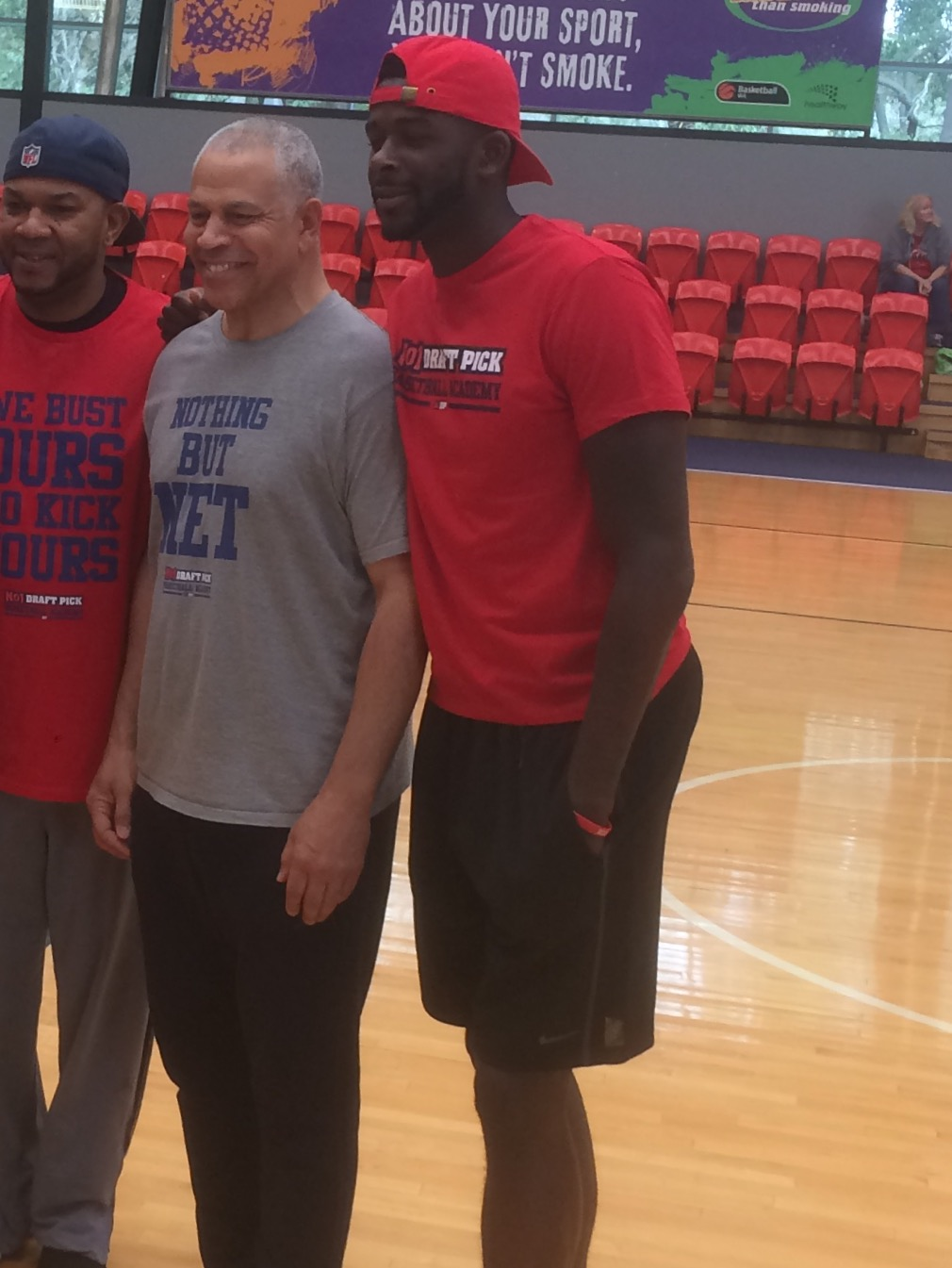
Ennis during the 2017 off-season

On July 13, 2016, Ennis signed a two-year, $6 million contract with the Memphis Grizzlies, returning to the franchise for a second stint. In the Grizzlies' season opener on October 26, 2016, Ennis recorded 15 points and six rebounds in 28 minutes as a starter in a 102–98 win over the Minnesota Timberwolves. Four days later, he scored eight points and tied a career high with 12 rebounds in a 112–103 overtime win over the Washington Wizards. On November 2, 2016, he had a season-best game with 16 points and 10 rebounds in an 89–83 win over his former team, the New Orleans Pelicans. Ennis started in 13 of the Grizzlies' first 14 games before missing his first game of the season on November 23 against the Philadelphia 76ers due to a calf injury. He missed 14 games in total with a right calf injury, returning to action on December 18 against the Utah Jazz. For the season, he appeared in 64 games and averaged 6.7 points on 37.2 percent shooting from three-point range, four rebounds, 0.7 steals and 23.5 minutes per game. In the 64 games he appeared in, he scored double-digit points in 16 games, never reaching the 20-point mark.

On November 29, 2017, Ennis scored a season-high 15 points in a 104–95 loss to the San Antonio Spurs.

=== Detroit Pistons (2018) ===
On February 8, 2018, the Grizzlies traded Ennis to the Detroit Pistons in exchange for Brice Johnson and a 2022 second-round draft pick. In his debut for the Pistons three days later, Ennis scored 14 points in a 118–115 loss to the Atlanta Hawks. On March 2, 2018, he scored a season-high 21 points in a 115–106 overtime loss to the Orlando Magic.

=== Houston Rockets (2018–2019) ===
On July 13, 2018, Ennis signed a two-year, $3.4 million contract with the Houston Rockets, with a player option for the second season, worth $1.8 million. Ennis missed three games to finish October with a right hamstring strain. On November 15, he scored a season-high 19 points against the Golden State Warriors. After starting in 22 games to start the season, Ennis came off the bench for the first time on December 11 against the Portland Trail Blazers, but left the game with a strained right hamstring. He subsequently missed the next 10 games.

=== Philadelphia 76ers (2019–2020) ===
On February 7, 2019, Ennis was traded to the Philadelphia 76ers, with Houston receiving the right to swap 2021 second-round picks with the 76ers. He became a key part of Philadelphia's rotation to finish the regular season and during the playoffs. In Game 2 of the 76ers' second-round playoff series against the Toronto Raptors, Ennis scored 13 points in a 94–89 win. At the season's end, he declined his player option for the 2019–20 season.

On July 12, 2019, Ennis re-signed with the 76ers, agreeing to a two-year, $4.1 million deal with a player option for the second year. On November 29, 2019, he scored 18 of his 20 points in the second half of the 76ers' 101–95 win over the New York Knicks. He went 3 for 4 from the 3-point line and was perfect on his nine free throws over 22 minutes after totaling just 24 minutes in his previous two games.

=== Orlando Magic (2020–2021) ===
On February 6, 2020, Ennis was traded to the Orlando Magic in exchange for a 2020 second-round pick. His addition and insertion into the starting lineup coincided with the Magic's offensive outburst and 8–4 stretch before the league paused on March 11 due to the COVID-19 pandemic. Ennis retained his starting spot upon the NBA's restart in July, which included the playoffs.

On November 25, 2020, Ennis re-signed with the Magic. He missed the first seven games of the 2020–21 season with a right hamstring strain. On February 11, 2021, he recorded 17 points and 10 rebounds in a 111–105 loss to the Golden State Warriors. He entered the All-Star break having missed three straight games due to soreness in his left calf. On March 21, he scored a season-high 18 points in 21 minutes off the bench in a 112–96 loss to the Boston Celtics. It was his first game in almost a month due to a strained left calf. On April 14, he set a new season high with 22 points in a 115–106 win over the Chicago Bulls. He played in just two of the final 16 games due to the calf injury.

=== Brooklyn Nets (2021) ===
On December 18, 2021, Ennis signed a 10-day contract with the Brooklyn Nets. He played two games for the Nets.

=== Los Angeles Clippers (2021–2022) ===
On December 29, 2021, Ennis signed a 10-day contract with the Los Angeles Clippers. He played two games for the Clippers.

=== Denver Nuggets (2022) ===
On January 10, 2022, Ennis signed a 10-day contract with the Denver Nuggets. He played three games for the Nuggets.

=== Hapoel Haifa (2022) ===
On March 7, 2022, Ennis signed with Hapoel Haifa of the Israeli Basketball Premier League.

=== BC Samara (2022–2023) ===
On August 22, 2022, Ennis signed with BC Samara of the VTB United League. In 30 games during the 2022–23 season, he averaged 14.2 points, 4.9 rebounds, 1.6 assists and 1.1 steals per game.

=== Grises de Humacao (2023) ===
In May 2023, Ennis joined Grises de Humacao of the Baloncesto Superior Nacional. In 12 games, he averaged 17.8 points, 8.0 rebounds, 3.2 assists and 1.5 steals per game.

=== Shijiazhuang Xianglan and Al-Ahli Manama (2023–2024) ===
In July 2023, Ennis joined Shijiazhuang Xianglan of the Chinese National Basketball League. Ennis averaged 30.88 points, 9.94 rebounds, 4.88 assists in 35.39 minutes in 17 games.

For the 2023–24 season, Ennis joined Al-Ahli Manama of the Bahraini Premier League. He helped the team reach the final of the Khalifa Bin Salman Cup after recording a game-high 30 points, 10 rebounds, eight assists and two steals in a semi-final win over Muharraq.

Ennis returned to Xianglan for the 2024 season. Ennis averaged 15.86 points, 5.86 rebounds, 2.59 assists in 21.42 minutes in 22 games.

=== Kagoshima Rebnise (2025) ===
On January 24, 2025, Ennis signed with Kagoshima Rebnise of the Japanese B.League for the remainder of the 2024–25 season.

=== Formosa Dreamers (2025) ===
On July 30, 2025, Ennis signed with the Formosa Dreamers of the Taiwan Professional Basketball League (TPBL). His contract was terminated by the Dreamers on December 15.

=== Piratas de La Guaira (2026) ===
In March 2026, Ennis signed with Piratas de La Guaira of the Superliga Profesional de Baloncesto.

== NBA career statistics ==
Legend
GP	Games played	GS	Games started	MPG	Minutes per game
FG%	Field goal percentage	3P%	3-point field goal percentage	FT%	Free throw percentage
RPG	Rebounds per game	APG	Assists per game	SPG	Steals per game
BPG	Blocks per game	PPG	Points per game	**Bold**	Career high

=== Regular season ===
Year	Team	GP	GS	MPG	FG%	3P%	FT%	RPG	APG	SPG	BPG	PPG
2014–15	Miami	62	3	17.0	.409	.326	.840	2.8	.8	.4	.3	5.0
2015–16	Miami	3	0	2.3	.000	.000	.000	.0	.3	.0	.0	.0
2015–16	Memphis	10	0	4.0	.308	.250	.600	.7	.2	.4	.2	1.6
2015–16	New Orleans	9	5	**31.3**	.500	.480	.792	3.9	**2.0**	**1.3**	.3	**15.9**
2016–17	Memphis	**64**	28	23.5	.455	.372	.782	4.0	1.0	.7	.3	6.7
2017–18	Memphis	45	14	23.4	.486	.357	.877	3.5	1.1	.7	.3	6.9
2017–18	Detroit	27	8	20.4	.457	.304	.767	2.5	.8	.6	.2	7.5
2018–19	Houston	40	25	23.7	.493	.367	.724	2.9	.7	1.0	.4	7.4
2018–19	Philadelphia	18	2	15.6	.410	.306	.696	3.6	.8	.2	.4	5.3
2019–20	Philadelphia	49	0	15.8	.442	.349	.787	3.1	.8	.5	.3	5.8
2019–20	Orlando	20	18	24.5	.451	.286	.838	**4.8**	1.1	.6	.4	8.5
2020–21	Orlando	41	**37**	24.0	.473	.433	.805	4.0	1.5	.8	.2	8.4
2021–22	Brooklyn	2	0	7.0	.286	**.500**	–	2.5	.0	.5	**.5**	2.5
2021–22	L.A. Clippers	2	0	14.0	**.636**	**.500**	**1.000**	2.5	.0	.5	**.5**	10.0
2021–22	Denver	3	0	4.7	.333	.000	.000	.7	1.0	.0	.0	1.3
Career		395	140	20.3	.457	.360	.797	3.3	.9	.6	.3	6.7

=== Playoffs ===
Year	Team	GP	GS	MPG	FG%	3P%	FT%	RPG	APG	SPG	BPG	PPG
2017	Memphis	6	4	**26.5**	.421	**.316**	**.857**	4.2	**1.2**	.8	.3	**8.3**
2019	Philadelphia	**11**	0	21.1	**.484**	.281	.632	3.8	1.1	.4	.3	7.5
2020	Orlando	5	**5**	23.8	.343	.250	.778	**5.8**	**1.2**	**1.0**	**.4**	7.0
Career		22	9	23.2	.431	.284	.738	4.4	1.1	.6	.3	7.6
