= Jeral Davis =

American basketball player (born 1984)

Personal information
- Born: September 17, 1984 (age 42) Toledo, Ohio, U.S.
- Listed height: 7 ft 1 in (2.16 m)
- Listed weight: 220 lb (100 kg)

Career information
- College: Talladega College (2008–2009)
- Playing career: 2009–2017
- Position: Power forward / center
- Number: 27

Career history
- 2010: Tijuana Zonkeys
- 2010–2014: Shimane Susanoo Magic
- 2014–2015: Sendai 89ers
- 2016–2017: Gaiteros del Zulia
- 2017: Club Bameso

Career highlights
- bj League Best Five (2013); 3× bj league Blocks leaders (2011–2013); Liga Profesional de Baloncesto Blocks leader (2016); CIBACOPA All-Star (2010)

Jeral Davis (born September 17, 1984) is an American former professional basketball player. He played overseas for the majority of his professional career, most notably in Mexico, Japan, Venezuela, and the Dominican Republic. Previously he attended Talladega College.

In 2010, Davis earned league all-star honors as a member of the Tijuana Zonkeys of the Circuito de Baloncesto de la Costa del Pacífico (CIBACOPA) in Mexico.
