= Jermaine Walker =

American basketball player (1977–2024)

Personal information
- Born: April 5, 1977 Pompano Beach, Florida, U.S.
- Died: December 11, 2024 (aged 47)
- Listed height: 6 ft 6 in (1.98 m)
- Listed weight: 225 lb (102 kg)

Career information
- High school: Blanche Ely (Pompano Beach, Florida)
- College: Miami (Florida) (1996–1997)
- NBA draft: 1998: undrafted
- Playing career: 1997–2007
- Position: Forward

Career history
- 1997–1998: Juve Caserta
- 1997–1998: Rapid City Thrillers
- 1998–1999: La Crosse Bobcats
- 1999–2000: Idaho Stampede
- 2000: Marinos de Oriente
- 2000: Gulf Coast SunDogs
- 2000–2001: Memphis Houn'Dawgs
- 2000–2001: Ironi Ashkelon
- 2001: Lakeland Blue Ducks
- 2001–2002: Fargo-Moorhead Beez
- 2002: FedEx Express
- 2002: Columbus Riverdragons
- 2002–2003: Huntsville Flight
- 2003–2004: Marinos de Oriente
- 2004: Aris Thessaloniki
- 2005: Rockford Lightning
- 2005: Marinos de Anzoátegui
- 2005: BCM Gravelines-Dunkerque
- 2006: Sioux Falls Skyforce
- 2007: Marinos de Anzoátegui

Career highlights
- Third-team Parade All-American (1996); McDonald's All-American (1996)

Jermaine Walker (April 5, 1977 – December 11, 2024) was an American professional basketball player.

== College career ==
Walker played college basketball for the Miami Hurricanes during the 1996–97 season. He was late to join the team as he failed his SAT twice before he passed it in December 1996. Walker left the Hurricanes in June 1997 to embark on a professional career.

== Professional career ==
Walker was under contract with Toronto Raptors (1999), Miami Heat (1999) and Orlando Magic (2002) of the National Basketball Association (NBA). He played professionally for Juve Caserta in Italy (1997–98), Rapid City Thrillers (IBA, 1997–98), La Crosse Bobcats (CBA, 1998–99), Idaho Stampede (CBA, 1999–00), Marinos B.B.C. (Venezuela, 2000), Gulf Coast SunDogs (USBL, 2000), Memphis Houn'Dawgs (ABA, 2000–01), Ironi Ashkelon (Israel, 2000–01), Lakeland Blue Ducks (USBL, 2001), Fargo-Moorhead Beez (CBA, 2001–02), FedEx Express (Philippines, 2002), Columbus Riverdragons and Huntsville Flight (NBDL, 2002–03), Marinos B.B.C. (Venezuela, 2003–04), Aris Thessaloniki (Greece, 2004), Rockford Lightning (CBA, 2005), Marinos B.B.C. (Venezuela, 2005), BCM Gravelines-Dunkerque (France, 2005), Sioux Falls Skyforce (CBA, 2006) and again with Marinos B.B.C. in Venezuela in 2007.

== Personal life and death ==
On September 22, 1998, Walker was shot in his left hip and had his car stolen after he was confronted outside his parents' house in Pompano Beach, Florida. Travaris Welch, who was identified by Walker, was charged with armed robbery and attempted murder.

Walker died on December 11, 2024, at the age of 47.
