= Ruben Nembhard =

American basketball player (born 1972)

Personal information
- Born: February 20, 1972 (age 54) Bronx, New York, U.S.
- Listed height: 6 ft 3 in (1.91 m)
- Listed weight: 208 lb (94 kg)

Career information
- High school: DeWitt Clinton (Bronx, New York)
- College: Paris JC (1991–1993); Weber State (1993–1995)
- NBA draft: 1995: undrafted
- Position: Point guard / shooting guard
- Number: 30, 9

Career history
- 1996–1997: Yakima Sun Kings
- 1997: Utah Jazz
- 1997: Portland Trail Blazers
- 1998–1999: La Crosse Bobcats
- 1999: Rockford Lightning
- 2001–2002: Fargo-Moorhead Beez
- 2002–2003: Idaho Stampede

Career highlights
- All-CBA First Team (2002); Big Sky Player of the Year (1995); First-team All-Big Sky (1995)
- Stats at NBA.com
- Stats at Basketball Reference

Ruben R. Nembhard (born February 20, 1972) is an American former professional basketball player who played in the National Basketball Association (NBA). A 6-foot-3-inch (1.91 m), 208-pound (94 kg) guard, he last played in the Venezuelan LPB for Gaiteros del Zulia.

Born in The Bronx, New York, Nembhard attended Weber State University and Paris Junior College, and had a brief career in the NBA, playing a combined total of ten games for the Portland Trail Blazers and the Utah Jazz during the 1996–97 season. During the 1997–98 season he played with Iraklis Thessaloniki B.C. having 18.2 points average. Nembhard played for the Fargo-Moorhead Beez of the Continental Basketball Association (CBA) during the 2001–02 season and was selected to the All-CBA First Team. He also played 12 games for the Townsville Crocodiles of the Australian NBL in 2003–04.

Nembhard and his wife Terri have two children, son RJ and daughter Jayden.

== NBA career statistics ==
Legend
| GP | Games played | GS | Games started | MPG | Minutes per game |
| FG% | Field goal percentage | 3P% | 3-point field goal percentage | FT% | Free throw percentage |
| RPG | Rebounds per game | APG | Assists per game | SPG | Steals per game |
| BPG | Blocks per game | PPG | Points per game | **Bold** | Career high |

| Year | Team | GP | GS | MPG | FG% | 3P% | FT% | RPG | APG | SPG | BPG | PPG |
|---|---|---|---|---|---|---|---|---|---|---|---|---|
| 1996–97 | Utah | **8** | 0 | **11.8** | .414 | .000 | **.800** | **1.0** | 1.5 | .8 | .0 | **4.0** |
| 1996–97 | Dallas | 2 | 0 | 9.5 | **.500** | .000 | — | .0 | **2.5** | **1.5** | .0 | **4.0** |
| Career | | 10 | 0 | 11.3 | .432 | .000 | .800 | .8 | 1.7 | .9 | .0 | 4.0 |
