= Superliga Profesional de Baloncesto =

Professional basketball league in Venezuela

- Founded: 1974; 52 years ago (the SPB in 2022)
- First season: 1974
- Country: Venezuela
- Conferences: Eastern / Western
- Number of teams: 14
- Level on pyramid: 1
- International cup: BCL Americas
- Current champions: Marinos B.B.C. (12th title) (2026)
- Most championships: Marinos de Anzoátegui (12 titles)
- Website: www.spbven.com

The Superliga Profesional de Baloncesto, commonly known as the SPB, is the Venezuelan first division national professional basketball league. Founded in 1974 as the Liga Especial de Baloncesto, it adopted the name Liga Profesional de Baloncesto in the 1993 season, and the name SuperLiga in 2019. Marinos are the team with most championships with 11. The winners and runners-up of each LPB season qualify for the FIBA Americas League regular season.

The 2018 season was the last played with the name Liga Profesional de Baloncesto: in 2019 a new competition called Copa LPB was played. In late 2019 the president of the Venezuelan Basketball Federation Hanthony Coello announced the creation of a new league called SuperLiga Profesional de Baloncesto.

== History ==
=== Liga Especial de Baloncesto (1974–1992) ===
In 1974 the league was founded as Liga Especial de Baloncesto (Special Basketball League). The initiative came from Leonardo Rodríguez, who had come back from the United States in September 1973 and had proposed the creation of a league to Arturo Redondo, the then-president of the Venezuelan Basketball Federation. Before the foundation of this league, which involved teams from all over the country, basketball was practiced at state level. The first edition of the league included four teams: Ahorristas de Caracas, Beverly Hills (also from Caracas), Colosos de Carabobo and Toyotas de Aragua. The first league was won by Ahorristas de Caracas, which defeated Colosos de Carabobo in the championship series, 3–2. The first MVP was American forward Robert Lewis of Colosos de Carabobo. In 1975 two teams joined the league: Panteras del Táchira and Petroleros del Zulia. In 1975, Sam Shepherd of Panteras del Táchira scored a then-record 57 points against Petroleros del Zulia; that season also saw the first LPB All-Star Game. The 1975 league title was won by Colosos de Carabobo, which defeated Panteras del Táchira in the final series. In 1976, two more teams joined: Caribes de Anzoátegui and Universitarios de Mérida. The 1976 season saw the first Venezuelan player win the MVP trophy: center Ramón Rivero of Panteras del Táchira.

In 1977, the league was divided in two groups: Este (East), which included Ahorristas de Caracas, Centauros de Cojedes, Guaiqueríes de Margarita and Caribes de Anzoátegui, and Oeste (West), which had Colosos de Carabobo, Universitarios de Mérida, Banqueros de Aragua, and Panteras del Táchira. Guaiqueríes de Margarita, which had debuted in the Liga Especial in 1977, won six consecutive championships from 1977 to 1982. During this period, Guaiqueríes had three MVP winners: Venezuelan forward Cruz Lairet in 1977 and Americans Gerald Cunningham and Lewis Linder in 1980 and 1981, respectively. In 1983 the league saw the highest number of participants yet, with 9 teams: Caribes de Anzoátegui, Colosos de Carabobo, Gaiteros del Zulia, Guaiqueríes de Nueva Esparta, Panteras de Lara, Taurinos de Aragua, Telefonistas de Caracas, Universitarios de Mérida and the Venezuela national team, which participated as a preparation for the 1983 Pan American Games. In the 1983 Liga Especial Panteras won the title, ending the winning streak of Guaiqueríes. In 1984 and 1985 Gaiteros del Zulia won two consecutive titles, led by American forward Michael Britt, a second round selection in the 1983 NBA draft who was named the 1985 MVP.

Between 1986 and 1989 Trotamundos de Carabobo won four consecutive titles, with Alfonso "Al" Smith winning three MVP awards in a row (1987, 1988 and 1989). Trotamundos had several players from the Venezuela national team such as Rostyn González, Luis Jiménez, Iván Olivares and Alexander Nelcha, and import players such as Al Smith, Sam Shepherd and Leroy Combs. The 1987 season saw the debut of Víctor David Díaz, who played for Panteras de Miranda and went on to become the all-time league leader in games played, minutes played and points scored. In 1990 Bravos de Portuguesa won the title, ending Trotamundos' winning streak, with the contribution of MVP Carl Herrera, who had just graduated from the University of Houston, where he played basketball in the NCAA Division I. In 1991 Marinos de Oriente won the league title, and Marinos forward Charlie Bradley, a former player of the University of South Florida, won the MVP award. In 1992 the league title went to Cocodrilos de Caracas, who had debuted the previous season replacing Halcones de Caracas. This was the second time a team from Caracas had won the championship following Ahorristas de Caracas in 1974.

=== Liga Profesional de Baloncesto (1993–2019) ===
The logo of the LPB

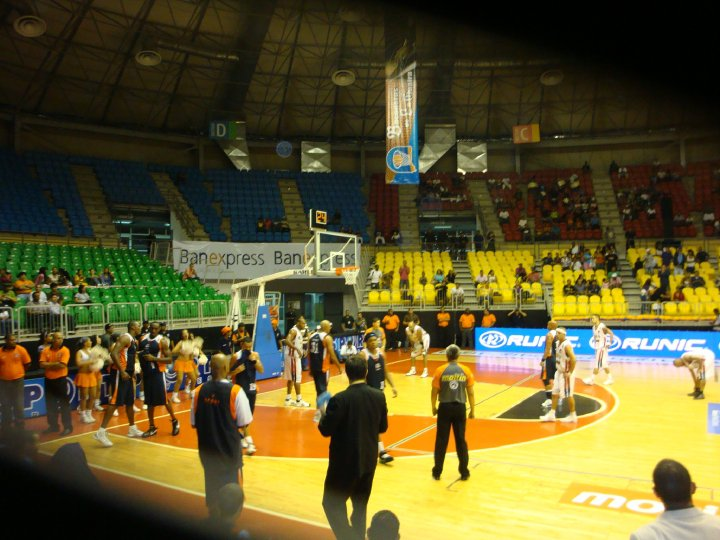
A game of Bucaneros de La Guaira, a team that joined the league in 2009

In 1992 the Venezuela national team had participated in the 1992 Summer Olympics in Barcelona, Spain. This had brought increased interest to basketball in Venezuela, and started a clash between the teams of the Liga Especial and the Basketball Federation for the division of broadcasting rights. This led to the creation of the Liga Profesional de Baloncesto (Professional Basketball League), which was a league owned by the teams and not under the direct control of the Federation. The first president was Tulio Capriles.

The first edition of league was played between 8 teams, with the best 6 advancing to the first round of semifinals ("Semifinals A"), of which the winners and the best losing team qualified for the second round ("Semifinals B"): the winners of Semifinals B qualified for the championship game in a best-of-7 series. The first LPB champions were Marinos de Oriente, which defeated Trotamundos de Carabobo in the final series, 4–3. The first MVP was David Wesley, a player who then went on to have a long career in the NBA. In 1994 Trotamundos won the title against Cocodrilos de Caracas, led by MVP Stanley Brundy, another player with NBA experience. In 1995 Panteras de Miranda won the title, defeating Marinos; Marinos also qualified for the 1996 finals, where they lost to Gaiteros del Zulia. In 1996 Harold Keeling of Toros de Aragua won the MVP award: he then went on to acquire Venezuelan citizenship, and played for the Venezuela national team. In 1997 Guaiqueríes de Margarita won their first title after 15 years: that season also saw Víctor David Díaz of Panteras de Miranda win the MVP award, the first Venezuelan to win it in the LPB era, and the first after 6 consecutive American MVPs (the last Venezuelan to win the award had been Carl Herrera in 1990).

In 1998 Marinos de Oriente defeated Trotamundos in the finals, and in 1999 Trotamundos won the title defeating Panteras de Miranda. In 2000 Cocodrilos de Caracas won the final series against Gaiteros del Zulia with the decisive basket of Lee Nailon, who scored in the final seconds of the seventh game of the series. In 2001 the league title went to Gaiteros del Zulia, and in 2002 Trotamundos de Carabobo won the league after having been down 1–3 in the final series. From 2003 to 2005, Marinos de Oriente won three consecutive titles. In 2006 Trotamundos de Carabobo defeated Guaros de Lara in the championship series and reached 8 league titles, a record at the time.

In 2007 the league title was won by Guaiqueríes de Margarita. In 2008 the league was expanded to 10 teams, with the addition of Gigantes de Guayana and Deportivo Táchira. The 2008 championship went to Cocodrilos de Caracas. In 2009 Deportivo Táchira moved to La Guaira, and became Bucaneros de La Guaira. The 2009 finals were won by Marinos, which also won the 2011 and 2012 titles after losing the 2010 finals to Cocodrilos de Caracas. Marinos reached 7 consecutive finals between 2009 and 2015, winning the titles in 2009, 2011, 2012, 2014 and 2015, reaching a total of 11, the most wins by a team in league history. In 2016 Cocodrilos de Caracas won the title against Bucaneros de La Guaira: the 2015–16 season was the first and only one to be played over two years instead of one. In 2017 and 2018 Guaros de Lara won two consecutive titles. In 2019 the Liga Profesional de Baloncesto was replaced by the Copa LPB, a tournament intended as a preparation to the national team's participation in the 2019 FIBA Basketball World Cup.

=== SuperLiga era (2019–2022) ===
The logo used from 2019 to 2022

In December 2019 newly elected Federation president Hanthony Coello announced that a new league called SuperLiga Profesional de Baloncesto was going to replace the LPB and was scheduled to start on February 28, 2020. On March 12, 2020, the Venezuelan Basketball Federation announced via Twitter that the planning of the new tournament was halted due to the coronavirus pandemic. The SuperLiga eventually commenced on October 13, 2020. A total of 13 teams participated after Trotamundos, Guaros de Lara and Cocodrilos de Caracas withdrew. Spartans Distrito Capital won the first SuperLiga title.

=== SPB era (2022–present) ===
On July 8, 2022, the SuperLiga and the LPB merged to form the Superliga Profesional de Baloncesto, commonly known as the SPB. The boards agreed to merge all records, statistics and championships of Venezuelan basketball.

== Format and rules ==
The competition consists of 20 teams divided in two conferences (West and East) who play each other twice at home and twice away in the regular season, for a total of 36 games. After that, the top four teams of each conference advance to the Playoffs. Every round (1st round, conference finals and league finals) are played in a best-of-seven format.

The regular season starts in February of each year and ends in May. Also, like the NBA, an All-Star Game is held at the middle of the season.

The rule that only two foreign players can play per team still stands.

== Current teams ==
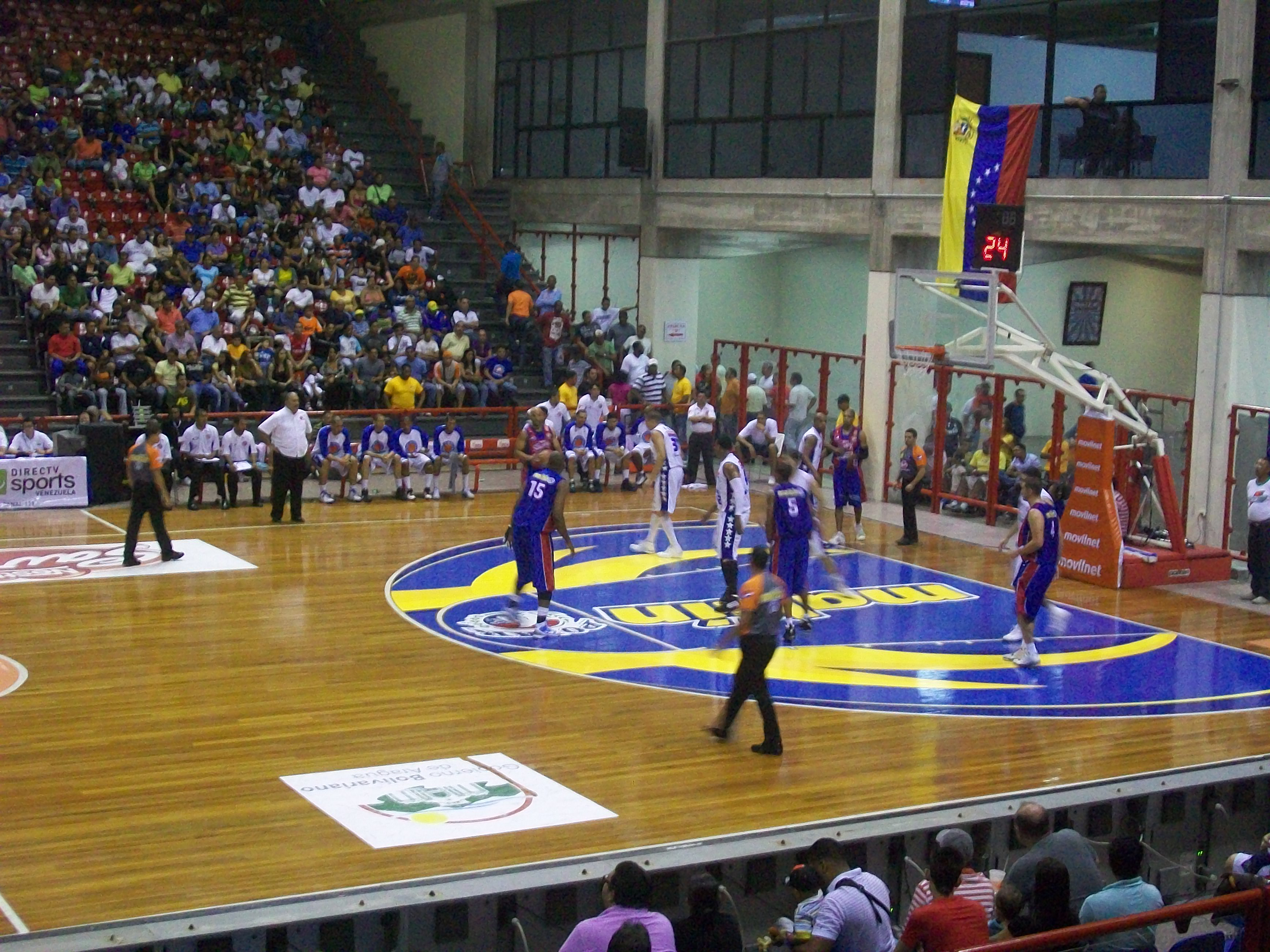
A 2010 game between Trotamundos de Carabobo and Toros de Aragua

The following 18 teams played in the 2024 SPB season.

=== Group 1 ===
Conferencia Oriental
Club	City	Arena	Capacity	Established
Brillantes del Zulia	Maracaibo, ZUL	Gimnasio Pedro Elias Belisario Aponte	4,500	2019
Broncos de Caracas	Caracas, MIR	Gimnasio José Joaquín Papá Carrillo	3,500	2016
Frontinos del Tachira	Táchira, IPA	Gimnasio Arminio Gutiérrez Castro	5,000	2023
Gladiadores de Anzoátegui	Puerto La Cruz, ANZ	Gimnasio Luis Ramos	5,500	2019
Llaneros de Guárico	San Juan de los Morros, GUA	Domo Olímpico de San Juan de los Morros	5,500	2018
Pioneros del Avila	Caracas, D. C.	Domo Ávila	3,000	2023
Spartans Distrito Capital	Caracas, MIR	Gimnasio José Joaquín Papá Carrillo	3,500	2019
Toros de Aragua	Maracay, ARA	Gimnasio cubierto Mauricio Johnson	3,000	2021
Trotamundos de Carabobo	Valencia, CAR	Forum de Valencia	10,000	1983

=== Group 2 ===
Conferencia Occidental
Club	City	Arena	Capacity	Established
Centauros de Portuguesa	Guanare, POR	Gimnasio Lara Figueroa	2,500	2020
Cocodrilos de Caracas	Caracas, D. C.	Gimnasio José Beracasa	6,100	1990
Diablos de Miranda	Caracas, MIR	Gimnasio José Joaquín Papá Carrillo	3,500	2019
Gaiteros del Zulia	Maracaibo, ZUL	Gimnasio Pedro Elias Belisario Aponte	4,500	1983
Guaiqueríes de Margarita	La Asunción, NUE	Gimnasio Ciudad de La Asunción	10,000	1977
Héroes de Falcón	Punto Fijo, FAL	Gimnasio Fenelón Díaz	2,000	2021
Marinos de Anzoátegui	Puerto La Cruz, ANZ	Gimnasio Luis Ramos	5,500	1976
Panteras de Miranda	Caracas, MIR	Gimnasio José Joaquín Papa Carrillo	3,500	1974
Piratas de La Guaira	La Guaira, LAG	Domo José María Vargas	8,000	2008

Did not participate:

- Gigantes de Guayana
- Guaros de Lara

== List of champions ==
Season	Champion	Result	Runner-up
1974	Ahorristas de Caracas	3–2	Colosos de Carabobo
1975	Colosos de Carabobo	3–2	Panteras del Táchira
1976	Panteras del Táchira	3–0	Ahorristas de Caracas
1977	Guaiqueríes de Margarita	3–1	Ahorristas de Caracas
1978	Guaiqueríes de Margarita	4–0	Panteras del Táchira
1979	Guaiqueríes de Margarita	4–0	Legisladores de Carabobo
1980	Guaiqueríes de Margarita	4–3	Retadores de Caracas
1981	Guaiqueríes de Margarita	4–2	Telefonistas de Caracas
1982	Guaiqueríes de Margarita	4–2	Panteras de Lara
1983	Panteras de Lara	4–2	Gaiteros del Zulia
1984	Gaiteros del Zulia	4–2	Guaiqueríes de Margarita
1985	Gaiteros del Zulia	4–3	Guaiqueríes de Margarita
1986	Trotamundos de Carabobo	4–1	Panteras de Miranda
1987	Trotamundos de Carabobo	4–1	Panteras de Miranda
1988	Trotamundos de Carabobo	4–2	Bravos de Portuguesa
1989	Trotamundos de Carabobo	4–0	Gaiteros del Zulia
1990	Bravos de Portuguesa	4–3	Marinos de Oriente
1991	Marinos de Oriente	4–2	Guaiqueríes de Margarita
1992	Cocodrilos de Caracas	4–2	Trotamundos de Carabobo
1993	Marinos de Oriente	4–3	Trotamundos de Carabobo
1994	Trotamundos de Carabobo	4–1	Cocodrilos de Caracas
1995	Panteras de Miranda	4–3	Marinos de Oriente
1996	Gaiteros del Zulia	4–3	Marinos de Oriente
1997	Guaiqueríes de Margarita	4–3	Cocodrilos de Caracas
1998	Marinos de Oriente	4–2	Trotamundos de Carabobo
1999	Trotamundos de Carabobo	4–2	Panteras de Miranda
2000	Cocodrilos de Caracas	4–3	Gaiteros del Zulia
2001	Gaiteros del Zulia	4–1	Bravos de Portuguesa
2002	Trotamundos de Carabobo	4–3	Panteras de Miranda
2003	Marinos de Oriente	4–3	Gaiteros del Zulia
2004	Marinos de Oriente	4–3	Gaiteros del Zulia
2005	Marinos de Anzoátegui	4–1	Guaros de Lara
2006	Trotamundos de Carabobo	4–2	Guaros de Lara
2007	Guaiqueríes de Margarita	4–3	Cocodrilos de Caracas
2008	Cocodrilos de Caracas	4–2	Gaiteros del Zulia
2009	Marinos de Anzoátegui	4–3	Cocodrilos de Caracas
2010	Cocodrilos de Caracas	4–2	Marinos de Anzoátegui
2011	Marinos de Anzoátegui	4–1	Cocodrilos de Caracas
2012	Marinos de Anzoátegui	4–2	Trotamundos de Carabobo
2013	Cocodrilos de Caracas	4–3	Marinos de Anzoátegui
2014	Marinos de Anzoátegui	4–3	Trotamundos de Carabobo
2015	Marinos de Anzoátegui	4–1	Guaros de Lara
2015–16	Cocodrilos de Caracas	4–3	Bucaneros de La Guaira
2017	Guaros de Lara	4–2	Marinos de Anzoátegui
2018	Guaros de Lara	4–3	Trotamundos de Carabobo
2019	Trotamundos de Carabobo	1–0	Guaros de Lara
2020	Spartans Distrito Capital	3–1	Gigantes de Guayana
2021 (I)	Trotamundos de Carabobo	3–1	Guaiqueríes de Margarita
2021 (II)	Guaiqueríes de Margarita	1–0	Trotamundos de Carabobo
2022	Trotamundos de Carabobo	4–1	Cocodrilos de Caracas
2023	Gladiadores de Anzoátegui	4–1	Guaros de Lara
2024	Gladiadores de Anzoátegui	4–0	Guaiqueríes de Margarita
2025	Gaiteros del Zulia	4–1	Trotamundos de Carabobo
2026	Marinos de Anzoátegui	4–1	Guaiqueríes de Margarita

== Championships ==
Teams shown in italics are no longer in existence.

Liga Profesional de Baloncesto winners by club
Club	Wins	Seasons won
Marinos	12	1991, 1993, 1998, 2003, 2004, 2005, 2009, 2011, 2012, 2014, 2015, 2026
Trotamundos de Carabobo	11	1986, 1987, 1988, 1989, 1994, 1999, 2002, 2006, 2019, 2021-I, 2022
Guaiqueríes de Margarita	9	1977, 1978, 1979, 1980, 1981, 1982, 1997, 2007, 2021-II
Cocodrilos de Caracas	6	1992, 2000, 2008, 2010, 2013, 2015–16
Gaiteros del Zulia	5	1984, 1985, 1996, 2001, 2025
Guaros de Lara	2	2017, 2018
Gladiadores de Anzoátegui	2	2023, 2024
Spartans Distrito Capital	1	2020
Halcones de Caracas	1	1974
Panteras de Miranda	1	1995
Legisladores de Carabobo	1	1975
Panteras del Táchira	1	1976
Panteras de Lara	1	1983
Cardenales de Portuguesa	1	1989

== Awards ==
- Most Valuable Player
- Grand Final MVP
- Rookie of the Year
- Defensive Player of the Year
- Sixth Man of the Year
- Most Improved Player of the Year
- Return of the Year
- Coach of the Year
- Exemplary Player of the Year
- Ideal Team of the Year
- Exemplary Team of the Year
- Manager of the Year

== Statistical leaders ==
=== Points ===
Year	Player	Team	PPG	Ref.
1994	(Venezuela) Gabriel Estaba	Malteros de Lara	26.7	
1995	Data not available			
1996	(United States) Harold Keeling	Toros de Aragua	24.0	
1997	(Venezuela) Víctor David Díaz	Panteras de Miranda	27.1	
1998	(Venezuela) Víctor David Díaz	Panteras de Miranda	24.0	
1999	(United States) Askia Jones	Guaiqueríes de Margarita	25.2	
2000	(United States) Ruben Nembhard	Gaiteros del Zulia	22.2	
2001	(Venezuela) Víctor David Díaz	Panteras de Miranda	22.9	
2002	(Venezuela) Víctor David Díaz	Panteras de Miranda	26.7	
2003	(United States) Ruben Nembhard	Gaiteros del Zulia	26.8	
2004	(Venezuela) Víctor David Díaz	Panteras de Miranda	25.9	
2005	(United States) Aaron Harper	Panteras de Miranda	24.1	
2006	(United States) Ruben Nembhard	Gaiteros del Zulia	22.6	
2007	(United States) Ruben Nembhard	Gaiteros del Zulia	21.8	
2008	(United States) Marcus Fleming	Guaiqueríes de Margarita	21.4	
2009	(Venezuela) José Gregorio Vargas	Trotamundos de Carabobo	19.2	
2010	(United States) Ruben Nembhard	Gaiteros del Zulia	23.3	
2011	Data not available			
2012	(United States) Donald Sims	Gaiteros del Zulia	24.1	
2013	(Dominican Republic) Kelvin Peña	Toros de Aragua	22.7	
2014	(United States) Andre Emmett	Cocodrilos de Caracas	22.4	
2015	(Puerto Rico) Jezreel De Jesús	Guaiqueríes de Margarita	22.9	
2016	(United States) Wendell McKines	Cocodrilos de Caracas	23.1	
2017	(United States) Al Thornton	Gaiteros del Zulia	23.6	
2018	(United States) Trey Gilder	Panteras de Miranda	26.5	
2020	(Venezuela) Tulio Cobos	Supersonicos de Miranda	16.3	
2021	(Venezuela) Luis Almanza	Trotamundos	18.1	

=== Rebounds ===
Year	Player	Team	RPG	Ref.
1998	(United States) Reggie Jackson	Toros de Aragua	9.9	
1999	(United States) Torraye Braggs	Toros de Aragua	11.7	
2000	(Panama) Rubén Garcés	Toros de Aragua	10.0	
2001	(Venezuela) Richard Lugo	Panteras de Miranda	9.8	
2002	(Dominican Republic) Jack Michael Martínez	Panteras de Miranda	11.2	
2003	(United States) Damian Cantrell	Guaiqueríes de Margarita	11.1	
2004	(United States) Aki Thomas	Toros de Aragua	9.7	
2005	(Venezuela) Richard Lugo	Trotamundos de Carabobo	9.8	
2006	(Venezuela) Richard Lugo	Trotamundos de Carabobo	9.8	
2007	(United States) Lee Benson Jr.	Marinos de Anzoátegui	11.0	
2008	(Venezuela) Axiers Sucre	Marinos de Anzoátegui	9.3	
2009	(Brazil) Hátila Passos	Marinos de Anzoátegui	8.2	
2010	(Venezuela) Richard Lugo	Trotamundos de Carabobo	9.3	
2011	Data not available			
2012	(Dominican Republic) Jack Michael Martínez	Cocodrilos de Caracas	10.5	
2013	(Dominican Republic) Jack Michael Martínez	Guaros de Lara	12.4	
2014	(Dominican Republic) Jack Michael Martínez	Trotamundos de Carabobo	10.9	
2015	(United States) Dwayne Jones	Guaiqueríes de Margarita	15.2	
2016	(United States) Dwayne Jones	Guaiqueríes de Margarita	14.5	
2017	(Venezuela) Axiers Sucre	Gigantes de Guayana	11.0	
2018	(Venezuela) Axiers Sucre	Gigantes de Guayana	10.2	
2020	(Venezuela) Luis Bethelmy	Cocodrilos de Caracas	11.5	
2021	(Venezuela) Anyelo Cisneros	Diablos de Miranda	9.7	

=== Assists ===
Year	Player	Team	APG	Ref.
1994	(United States) Sam Crawford	Marinos de Oriente	11.1	
1995	Data not available			
1996	(United States) Harold Keeling	Toros de Aragua	5.8	
1997	(United States) Harold Keeling	Toros de Aragua	6.5	
1998	(United States) Damon Jones	Trotamundos de Carabobo	7.8	
1999	(Venezuela) Harold Keeling	Marinos de Oriente	7.9	
2000	(Venezuela) Harold Keeling	Marinos de Oriente	6.5	
2001	(United States) Ruben Nembhard	Gaiteros del Zulia	5.9	
2002	(United States) Billy Keys	Cocodrilos de Caracas	7.1	
2003	(Venezuela) Ernesto Mijares	Marinos de Oriente	5.8	
2004	(United States) Ruben Nembhard	Gaiteros del Zulia	5.4	
2005	(United States) Ruben Nembhard	Gaiteros del Zulia	6.4	
2006	(United States) Ruben Nembhard	Gaiteros del Zulia	5.7	
2007	(United States) Ruben Nembhard	Gaiteros del Zulia	5.9	
2008	(United States Virgin Islands) Carl Krauser	Gigantes de Guayana	6.1	
2009	(Uruguay) Panchi Barrera	Trotamundos de Carabobo	5.7	
2010	(Ghana) Kojo Mensah	Panteras de Miranda	5.7	
2011	Data not available			
2012	(Mexico) Paul Stoll	Gigantes de Guayana	6.8	
2013	(Dominican Republic) Kelvin Peña	Toros de Aragua	5.8	
2014	(United States) Tu Holloway	Guaros de Lara	4.6	
2015	(Venezuela) Gregory Vargas	Marinos de Anzoátegui	8.0	
2016	(Venezuela) David Cubillán	Trotamundos de Carabobo	6.0	
2017	(Venezuela) David Cubillán	Trotamundos de Carabobo	7.5	
2018	(Venezuela) Heldrin Guillent	Guaros de Lara	6.9	
2020	(Venezuela) Kevin Pena	Centauros de Portuguesa	6.0	
2021	(Venezuela) Gregory Vargas	Cocodrilos de Caracas	6.2	

=== Steals ===
Year	Player	Team	SPG	Ref.
1994	(Venezuela) Gabriel Estaba	Malteros de Lara	3.7	
1995	Data not available			
1996	(United States) Harold Keeling	Marinos de Oriente	4.2	
1997	(United States) Harold Keeling	Marinos de Oriente	2.6	
1998	(Venezuela) Harold Keeling	Marinos de Oriente	3.6	
1999	(Venezuela) Ernesto Mijares	Panteras de Miranda	3.9	
2000	(United States) Alvin Sims	Toros de Aragua	4.3	
2001	(United States) Charles Byrd	Trotamundos de Carabobo	4.3	
2002	(Venezuela) Diego Guevara	Trotamundos de Carabobo	5.5	
2003	Data not available			
2004	(United States) Ronnie Fields	Trotamundos de Carabobo	4.9	
2005	Data not available			
2006	Data not available			
2007	(Colombia) Edgar Moreno	Cocodrilos de Caracas	3.5	
2008	(United States) Johnell Smith	Deportivo Táchira	3.8	
2009	(Venezuela) Heissler Guillent	Guaiqueríes de Margarita	3.7	
2010	(Venezuela) Heissler Guillent	Guaiqueríes de Margarita	3.2	
2011	Data not available			
2012	(Mexico) Paul Stoll	Gigantes de Guayana	4.3	
2013	(United States) Marquis Jones	Gigantes de Guayana	3.3	
2014	(United States) Smush Parker	Guaros de Lara	2.3	
2015	(United States) Carl Elliott	Cocodrilos de Caracas	2.3	
2016	(United States) Carl Elliott	Cocodrilos de Caracas	2.0	
2017	(United States) Carl Elliott	Cocodrilos de Caracas	2.9	
2018	(Venezuela) Heissler Guillent	Guaros de Lara	2.8	
2020	(Venezuela) José Sojo	Spartans Distrito Capital	2.6	
2021	(Venezuela) Harold Cazorla	Indios de Caracas	3.3	

=== Blocks ===
Year	Player	Team	BPG	Ref.
1998	(Venezuela) Richard Lugo	Panteras de Miranda	2.1	
1999	(United States) Andre Riddick	Trotamundos de Carabobo	4.1	
2000	(United States) Andre Riddick	Trotamundos de Carabobo	4.2	
2001	(Venezuela) Richard Lugo	Panteras de Miranda	3.3	
2002	(Venezuela) Richard Lugo	Panteras de Miranda	2.1	
2003	Data not available			
2004	(United States) Lonnie Jones	Guaiqueríes de Margarita	2.2	
2005	Data not available			
2006	Data not available			
2007	(Venezuela) Richard Lugo	Trotamundos de Carabobo	2.4	
2008	(Venezuela) Miguel Marriaga	Gaiteros del Zulia	1.7	
2009	(United States) Clarence Matthews	Gigantes de Guayana	1.3	
2010	(Venezuela) Richard Lugo	Trotamundos de Carabobo	1.7	
2011	Data not available			
2012	(United States) Rammel Allen	Marinos de Anzoátegui	2.3	
2013	(British Virgin Islands) Kleon Penn	Toros de Aragua	3.6	
2014	(United States) Lamont Barnes	Guaiqueríes de Margarita	1.5	
2015	(United States) Justin Williams	Panteras de Miranda	3.0	
2016	(United States) Jeral Davis	Gaiteros del Zulia	3.1	
2017	(United States) Maurice Sutton	Cocodrilos de Caracas	1.5	
2018	(United States) Tony Mitchell	Cocodrilos de Caracas	1.8	
2020	(Venezuela) Luis Carrillo	Guaiqueries de Margarita	2.3	
2021	(Venezuela) Windi Graterol	Spartans Distrito Capital	2.4	

== Records ==
=== Individual records ===
- Most games in a career

- 1,126 by Víctor David Díaz, 28 seasons (1987–2015)

- Most minutes in a career

- 32,078 by Víctor David Díaz, 28 seasons (1987–2015)

- Most points in a career

- 19,621 by Víctor David Díaz, 28 seasons (1987–2015)

- Most points in a game

- Regular season (overtime): 78 by Al Smith, Trotamundos de Carabobo (vs. Bravos de Portuguesa) on July 6, 1985 (3OT)
- Regular season (no overtime): 76 by Víctor David Díaz, Panteras de Miranda (vs. Bravos de Portuguesa) on June 5, 2002
- Playoffs: 58 by Al Smith, Trotamundos de Carabobo (vs. Bravos de Portuguesa) on May 9, 1986

- Most rebounds in a game
  38 by Ron Anthony, Gaiteros del Zulia (vs. Taurinos de Aragua) on May 27, 1983
- Most assists in a career

- 4,595 by Sam Shepherd, 23 seasons (1974–1997)

- Most assists in a game

- 28 by Leopoldo Bompart, Caribes de Anzoátegui (vs. Panteras del Táchira) on July 27, 1976
- 28 by Pedro Rojas, Bravos de Portuguesa (vs. Panteras de Miranda) on March 13, 1986

- Most blocks in a game

- Regular season: 13 by Carl Herrera, Bravos de Portuguesa (vs. Trotamundos de Carabobo) on April 20, 1986
- Playoffs: 11 by Andre Riddick, Trotamundos de Carabobo (vs. Panteras de Miranda) on June 29, 1999

== See also ==
- Venezuelan Basketball All-Star Game
