= Venezuelan Basketball Federation =

Governing body for basketball in Venezuela

Venezuelan Basketball Federation Federación Venezolana de Baloncesto
- Sport: Basketball
- Jurisdiction: Venezuela
- Abbreviation: FVB
- Founded: 1935
- Affiliation: FIBA
- Affiliation date: FIBA 1938; FIBA Americas 1938
- Regional affiliation: FIBA Americas
- (Venezuela)

The Venezuelan Basketball Federation (Spanish: Federación Venezolana de Baloncesto, abbreviated as FVB), is a governing body for basketball in Venezuela. It directs and oversees all of the basketball national teams of Venezuela, including both the junior and senior national teams of both men and women.

== History ==
The Venezuelan Basketball Federation was founded in 1935, and joined FIBA in 1938.

== Notable people ==
- José Herrera Uslar (born 1906), lawyer
