= Víctor Díaz (basketball) =

Venezuelan basketball player (born 1968)

Víctor David Díaz
Medal record

Men's basketball

Representing Venezuela

FIBA AmeriCup
Bronze medal – third place	2005 Santo Domingo	

FIBA South American Championship
Bronze medal – third place	2001 Valdivia	
Bronze medal – third place	2004 Rio de Janeiro	

Victor David Díaz (born February 4, 1968) is a basketball player from Caracas, Venezuela who last played with Gaiteros B.B.C. He holds the record for the most FIBA games in history (1,126). He participated with the Venezuela national basketball team at the 1992 Summer Olympics, the 2002 FIBA World Championship Where he was the second-highest scorer of the Championship and the 2006 FIBA World Championship, where he averaged 11 points per game. Diaz is 6'6"
