= Guaiqueríes de Margarita =

- Leagues: LPB
- Founded: 1977; 48 years ago
- Arena: Gimnasio Ciudad de la Asunción
- Capacity: 8,500
- Location: La Asunción, Venezuela
- President: Leopoldo Espinoza
- Head coach: Pablo Favarel
- Ownership: Rodolfo Tovar
- Championships: 9 Venezuelan Leagues
Home	Away

Guaiqueríes de Margarita is a professional basketball team based in La Asunción, Venezuela. The team currently plays in Venezuela's Liga Profesional de Baloncesto. The team has won the Venezuelan championships nine times.

== Current roster ==
LPB teams can only have three foreigners in the team.

Note: Flags indicate national team eligibility at FIBA-sanctioned events. Players may hold other non-FIBA nationalities not displayed.

Guaiqueríes de Margarita roster
Players
Coaches

Pos.	No.	Nat.	Name	Ht.	Age
C	0	(United States)	Dexter Pittman	2.11 m (6 ft 11 in)	37 – 2 March 1988
SF	2	(United States)	Tanksley Efianayi	1.98 m (6 ft 6 in)	30 – 6 July 1994
PG	3	(Venezuela)	Jose Sojo	1.80 m (5 ft 11 in)	29 – 30 January 1996
SG	6	(Venezuela)	Gendry Correa	1.90 m (6 ft 3 in)	29 – 9 January 1996
PG	8	(Venezuela)	David Cubillán	1.83 m (6 ft 0 in)	37 – 27 July 1987
F/C	9	(Venezuela)	Luis Valera	2.02 m (6 ft 8 in)	36 – 21 October 1988
C	15	(Venezuela)	Windi Graterol	2.06 m (6 ft 9 in)	38 – 10 September 1986
SF	16	(Venezuela)	Evert Bernal	1.95 m (6 ft 5 in)	29 – 6 March 1996
SF	20	(Venezuela)	Luis Velasquez	1.93 m (6 ft 4 in)	30 – 13 July 1994
SG	23	(Venezuela)	Jhon Brito	1.88 m (6 ft 2 in)	21 – 10 June 2003
F	24	(United States)	Tre McLean	1.96 m (6 ft 5 in)	31 – 19 October 1993
F/C	31	(Venezuela)	Ali Mata	2.06 m (6 ft 9 in)	27 – 27 December 1997

Head coach

- (Argentina) Pablo Favarel

Assistant coach(es)

- (Argentina) Daniel Farabello

Legend

- (C) Team captain
- Injured

== Trophies ==
- Venezuelan Champions: 9

1977, 1978, 1979, 1980, 1981, 1982, 1997, 2007, 2021-II

== Notable players ==
Note: Flags indicate national team eligibility at FIBA-sanctioned events. Players may hold other non-FIBA nationalities not displayed.

Criteria

To appear in this section a player must have either:

- Set a club record or won an individual award while at the club
- Played at least one official international match for their national team at any time
- Played at least one official NBA match at any time.

- (United States) Darius Adams (2012)
- (United States) Josh Davis (2013)
- (Puerto Rico) Renaldo Balkman (2013)
- (Puerto Rico) José "Piculín" Ortiz (1997; 1998)
- (United States) Antoine Wright (2012; 2013)
- (United States) (Venezuela) Askia Jones (1996−2001)
- (Venezuela) Carl Herrera (2002−2004)
- (Venezuela) Richard Lugo (2012−2016)
- (United States) Mike Hackett (1984–1985)
- (United States) Harold Keeling (1987)
- (United States) Dwayne Jones (2015–2016)
- (United States) Damian Cantrell (2003; 2005)
- (United States) Fred Vinson (2003; 2005)
- (Venezuela) Rostin González (1991)
- (Venezuela) Armando Becker (1990–1991; 1993–1994)
- (United States) Byron Larkin (1990–1991; 1993–1994)
- (United States) Ryan Forehan-Kelly (2004)
