= Trotamundos de Carabobo =

- Nickname: El Expreso Azul (The Blue Espresso)
- Leagues: SPB
- Founded: 1984; 42 years ago
- History: Trotamundos de Carabobo; 1984–present
- Arena: Forum de Valencia
- Capacity: 10,000
- Location: Valencia, Carabobo
- Team colors: Blue and White
- President: Giuseppe Palmisano
- Head coach: Guillermo Narvarte
- Ownership: Germán Blanco Romero
- Championships: 11 Venezuelan championships
- Website: trotamundosbbc.com
Home	Away

Trotamundos B.B.C. (transl. Globetrotters), also known as Trotamundos de Carabobo, are a professional basketball team based in Valencia, located in the Venezuelan Carabobo State. The team currently plays in the Superliga Profesional de Baloncesto (SPB). The team has won the Venezuelan championship 11 times. Trotamundos has also won the South American club championship three times, in 1988, 1989 and 2000.

== History ==
On June 11, 1983, Germán Blanco Romero bought the Andinos de Mérida team and named the team Trotamundos (in English: Globetrotters) in honour to the Harlem Globetrotters team. In 1986, the team managed to win its first national title after an impressive season with a 26–10 record.

The Trotamundos de Carabobo drew an average home attendance of 1,586 in the 2017 Liga Profesional de Baloncesto season, the second-highest average in the league that year.

== Trophies ==
Venezuelan Championship

- Winners (11): 1986, 1987, 1988, 1989, 1994, 1999, 2002, 2006, 2019, 2021, 2022

South American Club Championship

- Winners (3): 1988, 1989, 2000

== Roster ==
Note: Flags indicate national team eligibility at FIBA-sanctioned events. Players may hold other non-FIBA nationalities not displayed.

Trotamundos de Carabobo roster
Players
Coaches

Pos.	No.	Nat.	Name	Ht.	Age
F	0	(United States) (Venezuela)	Donta Smith	2.01 m (6 ft 7 in)	42 – 27 November 1983
G	2	(Venezuela)	Diego Sulbarán	1.86 m (6 ft 1 in)	20 – 12 May 2006
G	3	(United States)	James Reese V	1.93 m (6 ft 4 in)	27 – 8 December 1998
F	5	(United States)	Ricky Ledo	2.00 m (6 ft 7 in)	34 – 10 September 1992
G/F	7	(Venezuela)	Jhornan Zamora	1.96 m (6 ft 5 in)	37 – 30 January 1989
PG	8	(Venezuela)	David Cubillán	1.80 m (5 ft 11 in)	39 – 27 July 1987
C	9	(Venezuela)	Luis Rísquez	2.05 m (6 ft 9 in)	26 – 23 July 2000
G	11	(Venezuela)	Anthony Reyes	1.80 m (5 ft 11 in)	20 – 4 January 2006
G/F	12	(Venezuela)	Elvis Báez	1.91 m (6 ft 3 in)	36 – 17 November 1989
C	16	(Panama)	Eric Romero	2.10 m (6 ft 11 in)	27 – 1 June 1999
F	18	(Venezuela)	Tulio Cobos	1.98 m (6 ft 6 in)	40 – 11 October 1986
SF	23	(United States)	D. J. Kennedy	1.98 m (6 ft 6 in)	37 – 5 November 1989
SF	34	(Venezuela)	Edgar Martínez	1.98 m (6 ft 6 in)	29 – 23 January 1997
SF	73	(United States)	Dwayne Davis	1.96 m (6 ft 5 in)	36 – 27 November 1989
PF	77	(Venezuela)	José Rodríguez	1.98 m (6 ft 6 in)	32 – 20 January 1994

Head coach

- (Venezuela) Ronald Guillen

Assistant coach(es)

- (Venezuela) Ludwing Irazabal

Legend

- (C) Team captain
- Injured

- Roster
Updated: 20 March 2026

== Notable players ==
Note: Flags indicate national team eligibility at FIBA-sanctioned events. Players may hold other non-FIBA nationalities not displayed.

Criteria

To appear in this section a player must have either:

- Set a club record or won an individual award while at the club
- Played at least one official international match for their national team at any time
- Played at least one official NBA match at any time.

- (Venezuela) David Cubillán
