= Forum de Valencia =

Indoor sporting arena in Valencia, Carabobo, Venezuela

Coordinates: 10.220228°N 68.00395°W

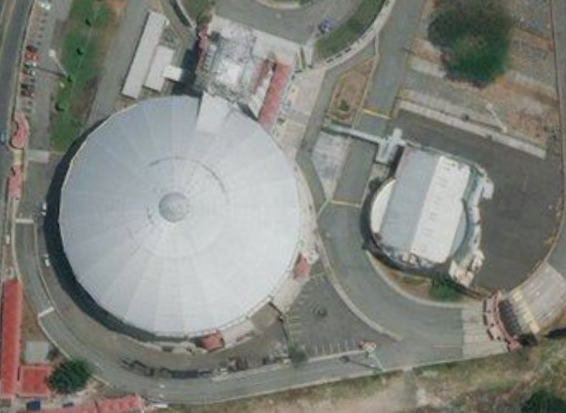

Forum de Valencia is an indoor sporting arena located in the Venezuelan city of Valencia, Carabobo. The capacity of the arena is 10,000 and is used mostly for basketball and concerts.

Construction of the venue began in 1988 and it was inaugurated in 1991.
