= Panteras de Miranda =

Venezuelan basketball team

- League: Superliga Profesional de Baloncesto
- Founded: 1974
- History: Panteras de Miranda; 1974–present
- Location: Miranda, Venezuela
- Team colors: Black, gold, and white
- Head coach: Daniel Seoane
- Championships: 1 (1995)
Home	Away	Third

Panteras de Miranda (transl. Miranda Panthers) is a Venezuelan professional basketball club based in Miranda. The club competes in the Superliga Profesional de Baloncesto (SPB), the highest tier.

After a short hiatus, the team made its return in 2023.
