= Piratas de La Guaira =

- Nickname: La Maquinaria Naranja (The Orange Machinery)
- Leagues: Venezuelan SuperLiga
- History: Deportivo Táchira B.B.C. 2007–2008; La Guaira B.B.C. 2008–2010; Bucaneros de La Guaira; 2010–2022; Piratas de La Guaira; 2022–present
- Arena: Polideportivo José María Vargas
- Capacity: 4,800
- Location: Maiquetía, Venezuela
- President: Gregory John
- Head coach: Ariel Amarillo
- Championships: 0
| Home | Away | Third |

The Piratas de La Guaira are a professional basketball team based in Maiquetía, Vargas, Venezuela. Founded in 2007 in San Cristóbal, Táchira as the basketball section of football club Deportivo Táchira, they relocated to Vargas state in 2010 and changed its name to Bucaneros de La Guaira. The team was re-founded as the Piratas in 2022. The team currently plays in the Superliga Profesional de Baloncesto, the top division of the Venezuelan basketball pyramid. The club also has a women's basketball team, volleyball and futsal teams.

== Current roster ==
Note: Flags indicate national team eligibility at FIBA-sanctioned events. Players may hold other non-FIBA nationalities not displayed.

Piratas de La Guaira roster
Players
Coaches

| Pos. | No. | Nat. | Name | Ht. | Age |
|---|---|---|---|---|---|
| F | 0 | (Venezuela) | Arias, Danny | 2.03 m (6 ft 8 in) | 29 – 12 March 1997 |
| F | 1 | (United States) | Ennis III, James | 2.01 m (6 ft 7 in) | 36 – 1 July 1990 |
| PG | 2 | (Dominican Republic) | Yeison Colome | 1.91 m (6 ft 3 in) | 29 – 27 November 1996 |
| F | 3 | (United States) (Nigeria) | Egbuta, Emmanuel | 2.01 m (6 ft 7 in) | 29 – 12 December 1996 |
| F | 4 | (Nigeria) | Oleka, Obinna | 2.03 m (6 ft 8 in) | 32 – 4 November 1993 |
| PG | 5 | (Venezuela) | Arian Amundaray | 1.92 m (6 ft 4 in) | 26 – 21 September 2000 |
| SF | 7 | (Venezuela) | Elder Giménez | 1.98 m (6 ft 6 in) | 35 – 5 July 1991 |
| F/C | 13 | (Venezuela) | Eduardo Díaz | 2.05 m (6 ft 9 in) | 32 – 25 October 1993 |
| SG | 15 | (Venezuela) | Ramos, Jesus | 1.87 m (6 ft 2 in) | 28 – 9 November 1997 |
| G | 20 | (Venezuela) | Bompart, Humberto | 1.84 m (6 ft 0 in) | 32 – 22 March 1994 |
| G/F | 24 | (United States) | Shabazz Muhammad | 1.98 m (6 ft 6 in) | 33 – 13 November 1992 |
| SF | 25 | (United States) | Hamilton, Jordan | 2.01 m (6 ft 7 in) | 36 – 6 October 1990 |
| C | 27 | (Venezuela) | Bolívar, Miguel | 2.05 m (6 ft 9 in) | 34 – 24 January 1992 |
| F/C | 45 | (United States) | Trice, Austin | 2.04 m (6 ft 8 in) | 29 – 17 October 1997 |
| PG | 88 | (Venezuela) | Centeno, Jesús | 1.90 m (6 ft 3 in) | 40 – 27 December 1985 |

Head coach

- (Venezuela) Nestor Garcia

Assistant coach(es)

- (Venezuela) Ricardo Moreno

Legend

- (C) Team captain
- Injured

- Roster
Updated: 21 March 2026

== Notable alumni ==
=== Players ===
To appear in this section a player must have either:

- Set a club record or won an individual award as a professional player.
- Played at least one official international match for his senior national team at any time.

- (Venezuela) John Cox
- (United States) James Ennis III
- (Venezuela) Windi Graterol
- (Venezuela) Donta Smith
- (Mexico) Juan Toscano
- (United States) Jordan Hamilton
- (United States) Sek Henry
- (United States) Lee Roberts
- (Lebanon) Ater Majok

=== Coaches ===
To appear in this section a player must have either:

- Set a club record or won an individual award as a professional coach.
- Coached at least one official international match for a senior national team at any time.

- (Spain) Iván Déniz
