= Cocodrilos de Caracas =

- Nickname: Los Saurios (The Saurians); El equipo de la Capital (The Capital Team)
- Leagues: Superliga Profesional de Baloncesto
- Founded: 1990; 35 years ago
- History: Cocrodilos de Caracas; 1990–present
- Arena: Parque Naciones Unidas
- Capacity: 6,100
- Location: Caracas, Venezuela
- Team colors: Red, Black and Silver
- President: Philip Valentiner
- Head coach: Néstor Salazar
- Championships: 6 Venezuelan Leagues (1992, 2000, 2008, 2010, 2013)
- Website: cocodrilosbbc.com.
Home	Away

Cocodrilos de Caracas (transl. Caracas Crocodiles) is a Venezuelan professional basketball club based in Caracas. Established in 1990, the club competes in the Superliga Profesional de Baloncesto (SPB), and has won the national championship six times. The Cocodrilos' home games are played at the Parque Naciones Unidas.

== History ==
The city of Caracas had known various teams that had played in the national premier basketball leagues. In the end of 1990, Dr. Guillermo Valentiner acquired the capital's basketball team and named it Cocodrilos de Caracas. In the first season of the team, it finished in fifth place. The team won its first national league after only one year, in 1992.

== Trophies ==
- Venezuelan LPB / Superliga: 6

1974 (Note: As "Ahorristas de Caracas") 1992, 2000, 2008, 2010, 2013

== Season by season ==
Season	Tier	League	Pos.	Postseason
2010	1	LPB	1	Champion
2011	1	LPB	1	Finalist
2012	1	LPB	2	Semifinalist
2013	1	LPB	2	Champion
2014	1	LPB	2	Semifinalist

== Notable alumni ==
=== Players ===
Note: Flags indicate national team eligibility at FIBA-sanctioned events. Players may hold other non-FIBA nationalities not displayed.

Criteria

To appear in this section a player must have either:

- Set a club record or won an individual award while at the club
- Played at least one official international match for their national team at any time
- Played at least one official NBA match at any time.

- (Venezuela) Carl Herrera (2003–2004)
- (Venezuela) Garly Sojo
- (Dominican Republic) Luis David Montero
- (Canada) Rowan Barrett
- (Uruguay) Leandro Garcia Morales
- (United States) Cedric Ball
- (United States) Chris Childs
- (United States) Ramel Curry (2005)
- (United States) Kris Lang (2005)
- (United States) Tony Dawson
- (United States) Roy Hairston
- (United States) Anthony Mason
- (United States) Lee Nailon
- (United States) Carl Elliott
- (United States) Kevin Freeman
- (United States) Ray Jackson

=== Coaches ===
To appear in this section a player must have either:

- Set a club record or won an individual award as a professional coach.
- Coached at least one official international match for a senior national team at any time.

- (Venezuela) Nelson Solórzano
