= Gigantes de Guayana =

- Nickname: Los Colosos del Sur (The Colossi of the South)
- League: Venezuelan SuperLiga
- Founded: 1 February 2008; 18 years ago
- History: Gigantes de Guayana; 2008–present
- Arena: Hermanas Gonzalez Gymnasium
- Capacity: 3,000
- Location: Puerto Ordaz, Bolívar State, Venezuela
- Team colors: Wine Red and Blue
- President: Ángel Hernández
- Head coach: José Ramos
- Ownership: Freddy Díaz

Gigantes de Guyana is a basketball club based in Puerto Ordaz, Bolívar State, Venezuela that plays in the Venezuelan SuperLiga. Established in 2008, the team's home games are played at Hermanas Gonzalez Gymnasium where there is capacity for 3,000 people.

The Gigantes had their most successful season in 2020, when they finished as runners-up of the SuperLiga behind Spartans Distrito Capital, who won the finals 3–1.

== Honours ==
Venezuelan SuperLiga

- Runners-up (1): 2020
