= Gaiteros del Zulia =

- Leagues: Superliga Profesional de Baloncesto
- Founded: 1983; 43 years ago
- Arena: Gimnasio Pedro Elías Belisario Aponte
- Capacity: 4,500
- Location: Maracaibo, Venezuela
- Championships: 5 Venezuelan Championships (1984, 1985, 1996, 2001) 2025 spb
Home	Away

Gaiteros del Zulia is a professional basketball team based in Maracaibo, Venezuela. The team plays in Venezuela's Superliga Profesional de Baloncesto. They have won the Venezuelan championships four times.

== Trophies ==
- Liga Profesional de Baloncesto
  - Champions (5): 1984, 1985, 1996, 2001 2025

== Roster ==
Note: Flags indicate national team eligibility at FIBA-sanctioned events. Players may hold other non-FIBA nationalities not displayed.

Gaiteros del Zulia roster
Players
Coaches

Pos.	No.	Nat.	Name	Ht.	Age
G	1	(United States) (Dominican Republic)	Jesse Zarzuela	1.91 m (6 ft 3 in)	26 – 25 October 2000
PG	3	(Venezuela)	Ángel Blanco	1.79 m (5 ft 10 in)	29 – 4 March 1997
G	5	(Venezuela)	Rafael Melgarejo	1.84 m (6 ft 0 in)	35 – 13 September 1991
F	7	(Venezuela)	Diego Martínez	1.92 m (6 ft 4 in)	30 – 29 June 1996
PG	9	(Venezuela)	Carlos Gascon	1.78 m (5 ft 10 in)	36 – 6 September 1990
PF	11	(Venezuela)	Yanitson Quintero	2.01 m (6 ft 7 in)	27 – 8 December 1998
G/F	12	(Venezuela)	Hector Ortega	1.95 m (6 ft 5 in)	26 – 16 June 2000
SF	13	(Venezuela)	Graddy Osorio	1.93 m (6 ft 4 in)	39 – 15 May 1987
C	14	(Nigeria)	Peter Olisemeka	2.08 m (6 ft 10 in)	34 – 9 December 1991
F	15	(United States)	Andre Nation	1.96 m (6 ft 5 in)	33 – 26 June 1993
F	17	(Venezuela)	Erick Rodríguez	2.01 m (6 ft 7 in)	27 – 19 January 1999
C	20	(Venezuela)	Espinoza, Adrian	2.10 m (6 ft 11 in)	29 – 3 January 1997
G/F	23	(United States)	Nahziah Carter	1.98 m (6 ft 6 in)	27 – 24 August 1999
SG	24	(Venezuela)	Maolin Colina	1.90 m (6 ft 3 in)	36 – 14 September 1990
C	27	(Venezuela)	Dario Castro	2.06 m (6 ft 9 in)	34 – 15 December 1991

Head coach

- (Venezuela) Gustavo García

Assistant coach(es)

- (Venezuela) Niremberg Escalona
- (Venezuela) Miguel Ángel Corona

Legend

- (C) Team captain
- Injured

- Roster
Updated: 1 February 2026

== Notable players ==
Note: Flags indicate national team eligibility at FIBA-sanctioned events. Players may hold other non-FIBA nationalities not displayed.

Criteria

To appear in this section a player must have either:

- Set a club record or won an individual award while at the club
- Played at least one official international match for their national team at any time
- Played at least one official NBA match at any time.

- (Trinidad and Tobago) Ian Young
- (Indonesia) Lester Prosper
- (United States Virgin Islands) Carl Krauser
- (United States) Rammel Allen
- (United States) Blake Walker
