= Marinos B.B.C. =

Marinos de Anzoátegui
- Nickname: The Oriental Battleship
- Leagues: Superliga Profesional de Baloncesto
- Founded: 1976; 50 years ago
- Arena: Gimnasio Luis Ramos
- Capacity: 3,200
- Location: Puerto La Cruz, Anzoátegui, Venezuela
- Team colors: Blue, yellow
- Main sponsor: Carlos Silva
- President: Tony Armas Jr.
- Vice-president: Gianni Patino
- Head coach: Omar Gonzales
- Championships: 11 Venezuelan Leagues
Home	Away

Marinos B.B.C., also referred to as Marinos de Anzoátegui, is a professional basketball club based in the city of Puerto La Cruz, located in the Venezuelan state of Anzoátegui. The team currently plays in Venezuela's Superliga Profesional de Baloncesto (SPB). Marinos have won the Venezuelan championships 11 times.

== Trophies ==
- Liga Profesional de Baloncesto
  - Winners (11): 1991, 1993, 1998, 2003, 2004, 2005, 2009, 2011, 2012, 2014, 2015

== Notable players ==
- (Venezuela) Gabriel Estaba (1990-1991)
- (Venezuela) César Portillo (1993-1994; 1996-1998)
- (Venezuela) José Ramos (1991)
- (Venezuela) Héctor Romero (2002-2004; 2005-2006; 2009)
- (Venezuela) Óscar Torres (1997-1998; 2002; 2008; 2009-2011; 2012–present)
- (Venezuela) Omar Walcott (1991-1992)
- (Argentina) Gabriel Bottalico (1990)
- (Greece) Kostas Vasileiadis (2022–present)
- (Netherlands) Dan Gadzuric (2012–13)
- (Rwanda) Darrius Garrett (2017)
- (Spain) Germán Gabriel (2014)
- (United States) Charlie Bradley (1991)
- (United States) Mario Donaldson (2001)
- (United States) Aaron Harper (2013–present)
- (United States) Harold Keeling (1991-2004)
- (United States) Anthony Mason (1990-1991)
- (United States) Andrew Moten (1995)
- (United States) Leon Rodgers (2012–2013)
- (United States) Donta Smith (2010-2011)
- (United States Virgin Islands) Leon Trimmingham (1998)
