= 2017 FIBA Americas League =

FIBA Americas League
- Duration: January 20 – March 18, 2017
- Games played: 40
- Teams: 16

Finals
- Champions: (Venezuela) Guaros de Lara (2nd title)
- Runners-up: (Argentina) Weber Bahía Blanca
- Third place: (Puerto Rico) Leones de Ponce
- Fourth place: (Mexico) Fuerza Regia

Awards
- Grand Final MVP: Zach Graham

Statistical leaders
Points	Lucio Redivo	22.1
Rebounds	José Lloreda	13.5
Assists	Carlos Arroyo	8.5

The 2017 FIBA Americas League was the tenth edition of the top-tier level intercontinental professional club basketball competition in the Americas, the FIBA Americas League. Sixteen teams from across the Americas competed over three rounds, to determine the champion. Brazilian teams were not allowed to compete in the competition, due to the suspension of the Brazilian Basketball Confederation by FIBA, in November 2016.

Guaros de Lara were the defending champions, and they successfully defended their title.

== Teams ==
Group phase
(Argentina) San Lorenzo (1st)	(Uruguay) Hebraica Macabi (1st)	(Mexico) Soles de Mexicali (1st)	(Venezuela) Bucaneros Guaira(WC)
(Argentina) Club La Unión (2nd)	(Uruguay) Aguada (2nd)	(Mexico) Fuerza Regia (2nd)	(Venezuela) Cocodrilos Caracas(WC)
(Argentina) Estudiantes de Bahía Blanca (2nd)	(Panama) Correcaminos Colon (1st)	(Puerto Rico) Capitanes de Arecibo (1st)	(Venezuela) Guaros de Lara^{TH} (1st)
(Colombia) Academia de la Montaña (1st)	(Panama) Caballos de Coclé (1st)	(Puerto Rico) Leones de Ponce (WC)	Chile Leones de Quilpué (WC)

The labels in the parentheses show how each team qualified for the place of its starting round (TH: Americas League title holders):

- LC: Qualified through a licensed club with a long-term licence
- 1st, 2nd, etc.: League position after Playoffs

Notes

Note Wild Cards (WC): As the Brazilian sides were banned from the competition, FIBA invited Cocodrilos de Caracas and Bucaneros de La Guaira to the competition.

== Group phase ==
=== Group A ===
Pos	Team	Pld	W	L	PF	PA	PD	Pts	Qualification
1	(Mexico) Soles de Mexicali (H)	3	2	1	288	263	+25	5 (Note: Soles de Mexicali 1–1, +2; La Unión de Formosa 1–1, +2; Aguada 1–1, –4)	Advanced to Semifinals
2	(Argentina) La Unión de Formosa	3	2	1	242	233	+9	5	Advanced to Semifinals
3	(Uruguay) Aguada	3	2	1	287	287	0	5	
4	(Panama) Correcaminos Colón	3	0	3	246	280	−34	3	

Source: FIBA
(H) Hosts
Notes:

20 January 2017
18:00 PST

Report

La Unión de Formosa (Argentina)	87–76	(Uruguay) Aguada
Scoring by quarter: 30–20, 18–17, 16–21, 23–18
Pts: Francis 21; Rebs: Francis 13; Asts: Konsztadt 10		Pts: Lamonte 20; Rebs: Curtis 8 Asts: Barrera 8

Auditorio del Estado, Mexicali
Referees: Roberto Oliveros (VEN), Carlos Peralta (ECU), Roberto Vazquez (PUR)

20 January 2017
20:15 PST

Report

Soles de Mexicali (Mexico)	100–77	(Panama) Correcaminos Colón
Scoring by quarter: 26–15, 23–22, 22–17, 29–23
Pts: Oguchi 32; Rebs: Oguchi 6 Asts: Meza 13		Pts: Gaskins 19; Rebs: Henriquez 9 Asts: Gaskins 3

Auditorio del Estado, Mexicali
Referees: José Fernandez (CRC), Daniel Garcia (VEN), Jorge Vazquez (PUR)

21 January 2017
16:15 PST

Report

Correcaminos Colón (Panama)	77–84	(Argentina) La Unión de Formosa
Scoring by quarter: 24–17, 16–25, 15–16, 22–26
Pts: Oglivie 18; Rebs: Henriquez 10; Asts: Gipson 4		Pts: Vargas 18; Rebs: Francis 16; Asts: Konsztadt 4

Auditorio del Estado, Mexicali
Referees: Daniel Garcia (VEN), Roberto Oliveros (VEN), Carlos Peralta (ECU)

21 January 2017
18:30 PST

Report

Aguada (Uruguay)	115–108 (OT)	(Mexico) Soles de Mexicali
Scoring by quarter: 28–27, 28–15, 26–31, 15–24, Overtime: 18–11
Pts: Smith 41; Rebs: Haller 12; Asts: Barrera 9		Pts: Keenan 34; Rebs: Keenan 11; Asts: Perez 6

Auditorio del Estado, Mexicali
Referees: José Fernandez (CRC), Jorge Vazquez (PUR), Roberto Vazquez (PUR)

22 January 2017
16:15 PST

Report

Correcaminos Colón (Panama)	92–96	(Uruguay) Aguada
Scoring by quarter: 26–22, 15–26, 22–21, 29–27
Pts: Galindo 20; Rebs: Henriquez 9 Asts: Gaskins 7		Pts: Alvarez 29; Rebs: Smith 13; Asts: Smith 7

Auditorio del Estado, Mexicali
Referees: Roberto Oliveros (VEN), José Fernandez (CRC), Carlos Peralta (ECU)

22 January 2017
18:30 PST

Report

Soles de Mexicali (Mexico)	80–71	(Argentina) La Unión de Formosa
Scoring by quarter: 23–18, 14–19, 27–20, 16–14
Pts: Keenan 30; Rebs: Keenan 10; Asts: Perez 5		Pts: Francis 15; Rebs: Francis 12; Asts: Piñero, Sandrini 3

Auditorio del Estado, Mexicali
Referees: Jorge Vazquez (PUR), Daniel Garcia (VEN), Roberto Vazquez (PUR)

=== Group B ===
Pos	Team	Pld	W	L	PF	PA	PD	Pts	Qualification
1	(Mexico) Fuerza Regia (H)	3	3	0	282	215	+67	6	Advanced to Semifinals
2	(Venezuela) Guaros de Lara	3	2	1	273	247	+26	5	Advanced to Semifinals
3	(Panama) Caballos de Coclé	3	1	2	245	261	−16	4	
4	(Chile) Leones de Quilpué	3	0	3	233	310	−77	3	

Source: FIBA
(H) Hosts

27 January 2017
18:00 CST

Report

Guaros de Lara (Venezuela)	92–83	(Panama) Caballos de Coclé
Scoring by quarter: 20–22, 25–12, 26–22, 21–27
Pts: Graham 15; Rebs: Echenique 9 Asts: Guillént 14		Pts: Sánchez 19; Rebs: Carter, Garcia 8 Asts: Rodriguez 7

Gimnasio Nuevo León Unido, Monterrey
Referees: Roberto Vazquez (PUR), José Fernandez (CRC), Jose Melgarejo (COL)

27 January 2017
20:15 CST

Report

Fuerza Regia (Mexico)	109–73	(Chile) Leones de Quilpué
Scoring by quarter: 18–16, 31–15, 25–19, 35–23
Pts: Panko 20; Rebs: Hernández 7 Asts: Rivera 10		Pts: Glover 22; Rebs: Glover 6 Asts: Bowdry 5

Gimnasio Nuevo León Unido, Monterrey
Referees: Jesed Diaz (PUR), Mauricio Chinchilla (CRC), Gonzalo Salgueiro (URU)

28 January 2017
18:00 CST

Report

Leones de Quilpué (Chile)	80–103	(Venezuela) Guaros de Lara
Scoring by quarter: 14–19, 26–34, 21–30, 19–20
Pts: Coleman 18; Rebs: Bowdry 11; Asts: Coleman 6		Pts: Bethelmy, Carter 20; Rebs: Colmenares 7 Asts: Abreu 9

Gimnasio Nuevo León Unido, Monterrey
Referees: Gonzalo Salgueiro (URU), José Fernandez (CRC), Jose Melgarejo (COL)

28 January 2017
20:15 CST

Report

Caballos de Coclé (Panama)	64–89	(Mexico) Fuerza Regia
Scoring by quarter: 9–26, 22–25, 20–24, 13–14
Pts: Melendez 14; Rebs: Carter 8 Asts: Garcia 3		Pts: Hernández 29; Rebs: Toscano 8 Asts: Rivera 7

Gimnasio Nuevo León Unido, Monterrey
Referees: Roberto Vazquez (PUR), Mauricio Chinchilla (CRC), Jesed Diaz (PUR)

29 January 2017
16:15 CST

Report

Caballos de Coclé (Panama)	98–80	(Chile) Leones de Quilpué
Scoring by quarter: 24–18, 25–17, 23–23, 26–22
Pts: Melendez 23; Rebs: Garcia 7 Asts: Rodriguez 7		Pts: Coleman 18; Rebs: Jones 7 Asts: Jones 8

Gimnasio Nuevo León Unido, Monterrey
Referees: Jose Melgarejo (COL), Mauricio Chinchilla (CRC), José Fernandez (CRC)

29 January 2017
18:30 CST

Report

Fuerza Regia (Mexico)	84–78	(Venezuela) Guaros de Lara
Scoring by quarter: 22–18, 9–22, 29–17, 24–21
Pts: Panko 25; Rebs: Rivera 8 Asts: Panko, Rivera 6		Pts: Graham 23; Rebs: Bethelmy 7 Asts: Abreu 5

Gimnasio Nuevo León Unido, Monterrey
Referees: Roberto Vazquez (PUR), Jesed Diaz (PUR), Gonzalo Salgueiro (URU)

=== Group C ===
Pos	Team	Pld	W	L	PF	PA	PD	Pts	Qualification
1	(Argentina) San Lorenzo de Almagro (H)	3	3	0	240	189	+51	6	Advanced to Semifinals
2	(Uruguay) Hebraica Macabi	3	2	1	239	234	+5	5	Advanced to Semifinals
3	(Puerto Rico) Capitanes de Arecibo	3	1	2	223	244	−21	4	
4	(Venezuela) Bucaneros	3	0	3	208	243	−35	3	

Source: FIBA
(H) Hosts

3 February 2017
19:15 ART

Report

Capitanes de Arecibo (Puerto Rico)	75–82	(Uruguay) Hebraica Macabi
Scoring by quarter: 13–25, 27–16, 9–24, 26–17
Pts: Greene 22; Rebs: Fischer 9 Asts: Alamo 3		Pts: García Morales 22; Rebs: Lloreda 13; Asts: Parodi 8

Polideportivo Roberto Pando, Buenos Aires
Referees: Leandro Lezcano (ARG), Omar Bermudez (MEX), Sebastian Negron (CHI)

3 February 2017
21:30 ART

Report

San Lorenzo de Almagro (Argentina)	76–51	(Venezuela) Bucaneros
Scoring by quarter: 20–11, 18–21, 19–10, 19–9
Pts: Deck 23; Rebs: Mata 9 Asts: Aguirre 9		Pts: Hamilton 19; Rebs: Hamilton 9 Asts: four players 1

Polideportivo Roberto Pando, Buenos Aires
Referees: Michael Weiland (CAN), Robinson Aracena (DOM), Felipe Valenzuela (CHI)

4 February 2017
19:15 ART

Report

Bucaneros (Venezuela)	80–85	(Puerto Rico) Capitanes de Arecibo
Scoring by quarter: 19–19, 17–23, 21–18, 23–25
Pts: Smith 17; Rebs: Smith 11; Asts: four players 3		Pts: Greene 23; Rebs: Fischer 11; Asts: Huertas 4

Polideportivo Roberto Pando, Buenos Aires
Referees: Robinson Aracena (DOM), Omar Bermudez (MEX), Leandro Lezcano (ARG)

4 February 2017
21:30 ART

Report

Hebraica Macabi (Uruguay)	75–82	(Argentina) San Lorenzo de Almagro
Scoring by quarter: 18–21, 19–14, 18–24, 20–23
Pts: Hicks 23; Rebs: three players 8 Asts: Parodi 5		Pts: Deck 29; Rebs: Deck, Sandes 6 Asts: Aguirre 9

Polideportivo Roberto Pando, Buenos Aires
Referees: Sebastian Negron (CHI), Felipe Valenzuela (CHI), Michael Weiland (CAN)

5 February 2017
19:15 ART

Report

Hebraica Macabi (Uruguay)	82–77	(Venezuela) Bucaneros
Scoring by quarter: 30–24, 11–18, 19–21, 22–14
Pts: Lloreda 26; Rebs: Lloreda 21; Asts: Parodi 7		Pts: Hamilton 27; Rebs: three players 6 Asts: Hamilton, Smith 3

Polideportivo Roberto Pando, Buenos Aires
Referees: Robinson Aracena (DOM), Leandro Lezcano (ARG), Felipe Valenzuela (CHI)

5 February 2017
21:30 ART

Report

San Lorenzo de Almagro (Argentina)	82–63	(Puerto Rico) Capitanes de Arecibo
Scoring by quarter: 34–12, 20–17, 18–17, 10–17
Pts: Deck 24; Rebs: Calfani 7 Asts: Aguirre 6		Pts: Huertas 12; Rebs: Fischer 7 Asts: Cruz, Huertas 5

Polideportivo Roberto Pando, Buenos Aires
Referees: Omar Bermudez (MEX), Sebastian Negron (CHI), Michael Weiland (CAN)

=== Group D ===
Pos	Team	Pld	W	L	PF	PA	PD	Pts	Qualification
1	(Argentina) Weber Bahía Blanca	3	3	0	267	234	+33	6	Advanced to Semifinals
2	(Puerto Rico) Leones de Ponce (H)	3	2	1	256	241	+15	5	Advanced to Semifinals
3	(Venezuela) Cocodrilos de Caracas	3	1	2	248	240	+8	4	
4	(Colombia) Academia de la Montaña	3	0	3	203	259	−56	3	

Source: FIBA
(H) Hosts

10 February 2017
17:45 AST

Report

Cocodrilos de Caracas (Venezuela)	75–77	(Argentina) Weber Bahía Blanca
Scoring by quarter: 19–27, 15–10, 16–20, 25–20
Pts: Flowers 25; Rebs: Caraballo, Sutton 6 Asts: Paul 6		Pts: Vaulet 18; Rebs: Johnson, Vaulet 8 Asts: three players 3

Auditorio Juan Pachín Vicéns, Ponce
Referees: Roberto Vazquez (PUR), Omar Bermudez (MEX), Michael Weiland (CAN)

10 February 2017
20:00 AST

Report

Leones de Ponce (Puerto Rico)	76–61	(Colombia) Academia de la Montaña
Scoring by quarter: 22–17, 15–8, 24–16, 15–20
Pts: Warrick 26; Rebs: Dawson 9 Asts: Arroyo 9		Pts: Hernandez 16; Rebs: Hernandez 15; Asts: Bacci 4

Auditorio Juan Pachín Vicéns, Ponce
Referees: Alejandro Sanchez (URU), Julio Anaya (PAN), Robinson Aracena (DOM)

11 February 2017
17:45 AST

Report

Academia de la Montaña (Colombia)	67–94	(Argentina) Weber Bahía Blanca
Scoring by quarter: 17–22, 12–22, 16–24, 22–26
Pts: Gransberry 17; Rebs: Gransberry 13; Asts: Bacci 4		Pts: Johnson 22; Rebs: Levy 6 Asts: Fjellerup 9

Auditorio Juan Pachín Vicéns, Ponce
Referees: Roberto Vazquez (PUR), Julio Anaya (PAN), Omar Bermudez (MEX)

11 February 2017
20:00 AST

Report

Cocodrilos de Caracas (Venezuela)	84–88	(Puerto Rico) Leones de Ponce
Scoring by quarter: 16–24, 19–18, 16–21, 33–25
Pts: Sutton 25; Rebs: Rodriguez 10; Asts: Paul 7		Pts: Vassallo 25; Rebs: Dawson 12; Asts: Arroyo 5

Auditorio Juan Pachín Vicéns, Ponce
Referees: Michael Weiland (CAN), Robinson Aracena (DOM), Alejandro Sanchez (URU)

12 February 2017
17:00 AST

Report

Academia de la Montaña (Colombia)	75–89	(Venezuela) Cocodrilos de Caracas
Scoring by quarter: 19–21, 20–23, 18–33, 18–12
Pts: Rodriguez 23; Rebs: Gransberry 13; Asts: Pena 6		Pts: Flowers, Garcia 18; Rebs: Rodriguez 9 Asts: Palacios 8

Auditorio Juan Pachín Vicéns, Ponce
Referees: Roberto Vazquez (PUR), Robinson Aracena (DOM), Omar Bermudez (MEX)

12 February 2017
19:15 AST

Report

Leones de Ponce (Puerto Rico)	92–96 (OT)	(Argentina) Weber Bahía Blanca
Scoring by quarter: 23–23, 20–17, 22–20, 15–20, Overtime: 12–16
Pts: Vassallo 34; Rebs: Warrick 10; Asts: Dawson 6		Pts: Johnson 22; Rebs: Johnson 7 Asts: Redivo 7

Auditorio Juan Pachín Vicéns, Ponce
Referees: Michael Weiland (CAN), Julio Anaya (PAN), Alejandro Sanchez (URU)

== Semifinals ==
=== Group E ===
Pos	Team	Pld	W	L	PF	PA	PD	Pts	Qualification
1	(Mexico) Fuerza Regia (H)	3	3	0	236	199	+37	6	Advance to Final 4
2	(Venezuela) Guaros de Lara	3	2	1	240	235	+5	5	Advance to Final 4
3	(Argentina) La Unión de Formosa	3	1	2	221	251	−30	4	
4	(Mexico) Soles de Mexicali	3	0	3	219	231	−12	3	

Source: FIBA
(H) Hosts

24 February 2017
18:00 CST

Report

Guaros de Lara (Venezuela)	88–86	(Mexico) Soles de Mexicali
Scoring by quarter: 20–24, 24–23, 31–18, 13–21
Pts: Guillént 18; Rebs: Colmenares, Echenique 9 Asts: Guillént 7		Pts: Keenan 21; Rebs: Keenan 8 Asts: Keenan, C. Perez 4

Gimnasio Nuevo León Unido, Monterrey
Referees: Jorge Vazquez (PUR), Julio Anaya (PAN), Leandro Lezcano (ARG)

24 February 2017
20:15 CST

Report

Fuerza Regia (Mexico)	93–72	(Argentina) La Unión de Formosa
Scoring by quarter: 25–17, 22–19, 26–17, 20–19
Pts: Akindele 19; Rebs: three players 6 Asts: Akindele 7		Pts: Francis 19; Rebs: Francis 9 Asts: Konsztadt, Sandrini 5

Gimnasio Nuevo León Unido, Monterrey
Referees: Reynaldo Mercedes (DOM), Mauricio Chinchilla (CRC), Roberto Vazquez (PUR)

25 February 2017
16:15 CST

Report

La Unión de Formosa (Argentina)	72–82	(Venezuela) Guaros de Lara
Scoring by quarter: 14–13, 24–21, 17–23, 17–25
Pts: Vargas 16; Rebs: Francis 10; Asts: Konsztadt 9		Pts: Hayward 21; Rebs: Hayward 10; Asts: Bethelmy 5

Gimnasio Nuevo León Unido, Monterrey
Referees: Jorge Vazquez (PUR), Mauricio Chinchilla (CRC), Roberto Vazquez (PUR)

25 February 2017
18:30 CST

Report

Soles de Mexicali (Mexico)	57–66	(Mexico) Fuerza Regia
Scoring by quarter: 12–15, 18–16, 10–19, 17–16
Pts: A. Perez 15; Rebs: Keenan, West 7 Asts: Keenan, Meza 3		Pts: Toscano 15; Rebs: Hernández 12; Asts: Toscano 6

Gimnasio Nuevo León Unido, Monterrey
Referees: Reynaldo Mercedes (DOM), Julio Anaya (PAN), Leandro Lezcano (ARG)

26 February 2017
16:15 CST

Report

Soles de Mexicali (Mexico)	76–77	(Argentina) La Unión de Formosa
Scoring by quarter: 17–22, 23–15, 25–18, 11–22
Pts: Keenan 21; Rebs: Keenan 7 Asts: A. Perez 5		Pts: Piñero 19; Rebs: Orlietti 8 Asts: Sandrini 8

Gimnasio Nuevo León Unido, Monterrey
Referees: Roberto Vazquez (PUR), Julio Anaya (PAN), Mauricio Chinchilla (CRC)

26 February 2017
18:30 CST

Report

Fuerza Regia (Mexico)	77–70 (OT)	(Venezuela) Guaros de Lara
Scoring by quarter: 21–11, 4–12, 24–21, 12–17, Overtime: 16–9
Pts: Akindele 19; Rebs: Akindele 14; Asts: Akindele 5		Pts: Hayward 18; Rebs: Hayward 10; Asts: Guillént 5

Gimnasio Nuevo León Unido, Monterrey
Referees: Jorge Vazquez (PUR), Leandro Lezcano (ARG), Reynaldo Mercedes (DOM)

=== Group F ===
Pos	Team	Pld	W	L	PF	PA	PD	Pts	Qualification
1	(Puerto Rico) Leones de Ponce (H)	3	2	1	277	269	+8	5 (Note: Leones de Ponce–Weber Bahía Blanca 95–82)	Advanced to Final 4
2	(Argentina) Weber Bahía Blanca	3	2	1	244	233	+11	5	Advanced to Final 4
3	(Argentina) San Lorenzo de Almagro	3	1	2	276	288	−12	4 (Note: San Lorenzo de Almagro–Hebraica Macabi 100–84)	
4	(Uruguay) Hebraica Macabi	3	1	2	233	240	−7	4	

Source: FIBA
(H) Hosts
Notes:

3 March 2017
17:45 AST

Report

San Lorenzo de Almagro (Argentina)	100–84	(Uruguay) Hebraica Macabi
Scoring by quarter: 22–26, 27–19, 25–21, 26–18
Pts: Deck 26; Rebs: Aguirre, Safar 7 Asts: Díaz 6		Pts: Lloreda 24; Rebs: Lloreda 12; Asts: García Morales 5

Auditorio Juan Pachín Vicéns, Ponce
Referees: Roberto Vázquez (PUR), Omar Bermúdez (MEX), Jesed Díaz (PUR)

3 March 2017
20:00 AST

Report

Leones de Ponce (Puerto Rico)	95–82	(Argentina) Weber Bahía Blanca
Scoring by quarter: 23–14, 24–25, 28–19, 20–24
Pts: Liz 21; Rebs: Warrick 12; Asts: Arroyo 14		Pts: Redivo 28; Rebs: Johnson, Vaulet 7 Asts: Fjellerup 6

Auditorio Juan Pachín Vicéns, Ponce
Referees: Michael Weiland (CAN), Robinson Aracena (DOM), Sebastián Negrón (CHI)

4 March 2017
17:45 AST

Report

Weber Bahía Blanca (Argentina)	89–69	(Argentina) San Lorenzo de Almagro
Scoring by quarter: 20–13, 24–13, 24–21, 21–22
Pts: Redivo 37; Rebs: Fjellerup 9 Asts: Levy, Redivo 6		Pts: Deck 17; Rebs: Mata 9 Asts: Aguirre 6

Auditorio Juan Pachín Vicéns, Ponce
Referees: Roberto Vázquez (PUR), Robinson Aracena (DOM), Omar Bermudez (MEX)

4 March 2017
20:00 AST

Report

Hebraica Macabi (Uruguay)	80–67	(Puerto Rico) Leones de Ponce
Scoring by quarter: 25–17, 12–10, 21–25, 22–15
Pts: Hicks 20; Rebs: Lloreda 14; Asts: García Morales 8		Pts: Liz 24; Rebs: Liz 6 Asts: Arroyo 10

Auditorio Juan Pachín Vicéns, Ponce
Referees: Reynaldo Mercedes (DOM), Sebastián Negrón (CHI), Michael Weiland (CAN)

5 March 2017
17:00 AST

Report

Hebraica Macabi (Uruguay)	69–73	(Argentina) Weber Bahía Blanca
Scoring by quarter: 16–14, 20–8, 20–21, 13–30
Pts: García Morales 26; Rebs: Lloreda 13; Asts: Parodi 8		Pts: Redivo 26; Rebs: Johnson 14; Asts: three players 3

Auditorio Juan Pachín Vicéns, Ponce
Referees: Roberto Vázquez (PUR), Omar Bermúdez (MEX), Michael Weiland (CAN)

5 March 2017
19:15 AST

Report

Leones de Ponce (Puerto Rico)	115–107 (2OT)	(Argentina) San Lorenzo de Almagro
Scoring by quarter: 17–14, 22–13, 24–30, 17–23, Overtime: 12–12, 23–15
Pts: Warrick 35; Rebs: Liz 11; Asts: Arroyo 10		Pts: Safar 23; Rebs: Aguirre 10; Asts: Aguirre 15

Auditorio Juan Pachín Vicéns, Ponce
Referees: Reynaldo Mercedes (DOM), Robinson Aracena (DOM), Sebastián Negrón (CHI)

== Final 4 ==
Semifinals
17 March
(Mexico) Fuerza Regia	65
(Argentina) Weber Bahía Basket	74
17 March
(Puerto Rico) Leones de Ponce	87
(Venezuela) Guaros de Lara (H)	100

Grand Final
18 March
(Argentina) Weber Bahía Basket	65
(Venezuela) Guaros de Lara (H)	88
Third Place Game
18 March
(Mexico) Fuerza Regia	68
(Puerto Rico) Leones de Ponce	90

=== Semifinals ===
17 March 2017
17:15 VET

Report

Fuerza Regia (Mexico)	65–74	(Argentina) Weber Bahía Basket
Scoring by quarter: 12–17, 16–17, 19–17, 18–23
Pts: Glynn 15; Rebs: Hernández, Panko 7 Asts: Toscano 3		Pts: Redivo 23; Rebs: Johnson 10; Asts: Fjellerup 5

Domo Bolivariano, Barquisimeto
Referees: Roberto Vazquez (PUR), Julio Anaya (PAN), Gonzalo Salgueiro (URU)

17 March 2017
19:30 VET

Report

Leones de Ponce (Puerto Rico)	87–100	(Venezuela) Guaros de Lara
Scoring by quarter: 18–27, 23–28, 22–16, 24–29
Pts: Liz 25; Rebs: Warrick 11; Asts: Arroyo 8		Pts: Graham 27; Rebs: Echenique 13; Asts: Guillént 10

Domo Bolivariano, Barquisimeto
Referees: Michael Weiland (CAN), Richard Pereira (URU), Alejandro Sanchez (URU)

=== Third Place Game ===
18 March 2017
17:15 VET

Report

Fuerza Regia (Mexico)	68–90	(Puerto Rico) Leones de Ponce
Scoring by quarter: 13–23, 19–23, 27–27, 9–17
Pts: Glynn 17; Rebs: Glynn 8 Asts: Cortes 8		Pts: Liz 24; Rebs: Reese 9 Asts: Arroyo 7

Domo Bolivariano, Barquisimeto
Referees: Alejandro Sanchez (URU), Richard Pereira (URU), Gonzalo Salgueiro (URU)

=== Grand Final ===
18 March 2017
19:30 VET

Report

Weber Bahía Basket (Argentina)	65–88	(Venezuela) Guaros de Lara
Scoring by quarter: 20–22, 17–13, 13–26, 15–27
Pts: Redivo 17; Rebs: Johnson, Levy 12; Asts: three players 3		Pts: Graham 20; Rebs: Bethelmy 12; Asts: Guillént 6

Domo Bolivariano, Barquisimeto
Referees: Roberto Vazquez (PUR), Julio Anaya (PAN), Michael Weiland (CAN)

== Awards ==
=== Quinteto Ideal (Ideal Quintet) ===
Ideal Quintet
Position	Player	Club
PG	(Puerto Rico) Carlos Arroyo	(Puerto Rico) Leones de Ponce
SG	(Argentina) Lucio Redivo	(Argentina) Weber Bahía Basket
SF	(United States) Zach Graham	(Venezuela) Guaros de Lara
PF	(Argentina) Gabriel Deck	(Argentina) San Lorenzo
C	(Venezuela) Gregory Echenique	(Venezuela) Guaros de Lara
