= 2016 FIBA Americas League =

Basketball competition

FIBA Americas League
- Duration: January 15 – March 12, 2016
- Games played: 40
- Teams: 16

Finals
- Champions: (Venezuela) Guaros de Lara (1st title)
- Runners-up: (Brazil) Bauru
- Third place: (Brazil) Mogi das Cruzes
- Fourth place: (Brazil) Flamengo
- Grand Final MVP: (United States) Damien Wilkins

Statistical leaders
Points	(United States) Shamell Stallworth	18.6
Rebounds	(Brazil) Alex Garcia	5.9
Assists	(Brazil) Ricardo Fischer	7.6

The 2016 FIBA Americas League was the ninth edition of the top intercontinental professional club basketball competition in the Americas. Guaros de Lara of Venezuela, won their first FIBA Americas League championship in team history, by beating Bauru of Brazil, by a score of 84–79, in the Grand Final.

== Preliminary round ==
=== Group A ===
Pos	Team	Pld	W	L	PF	PA	PD	Pts	Qualification
1	(Brazil) Mogi das Cruzes	3	3	0	259	209	+50	6	Advanced to quarterfinals
2	(Uruguay) Malvín	3	2	1	239	218	+21	5	Advanced to quarterfinals
3	(Dominican Republic) Metros de Santiago (H)	3	1	2	204	222	−18	4	
4	(Chile) Leones de Quilpué	3	0	3	208	261	−53	3	

Source: ligamericas.com
(H) Hosts

15 January 2016

Boxscore

Malvín (Uruguay)	60–82	(Brazil) Mogi das Cruzes
Scoring by quarter: 12–15, 19–19, 13–32, 16–16
Pts: Winston 19; Rebs: Hoskin 10; Asts: Calfani 3		Pts: Stallworth 25; Rebs: Santo 8 Asts: Pereira 3

Santiago de los Caballeros, Dominican Republic

15 January 2016

Boxscore

Metros de Santiago (Dominican Republic)	70–57	(Chile) Leones de Quilpué
Scoring by quarter: 13–7, 20–19, 17–12, 20–19
Pts: Deleon 19; Rebs: Sutton 11; Asts: Pena 5		Pts: Robinson 23; Rebs: Jones 9 Asts: Alvarez 2

Santiago de los Caballeros, Dominican Republic

16 January 2016

Boxscore

Leones de Quilpué (Chile)	68–91	(Uruguay) Malvín
Scoring by quarter: 15–21, 14–22, 22–28, 17–20
Pts: Robinson 21; Rebs: Robinson 9 Asts: Jones 3		Pts: Hoskin 20; Rebs: Calfani 11; Asts: Mazzarino 4

Santiago de los Caballeros, Dominican Republic

16 January 2016

Boxscore

Mogi das Cruzes (Brazil)	77–66	(Dominican Republic) Metros de Santiago
Scoring by quarter: 23–20, 12–14, 21–16, 21–16
Pts: Fernandes 20; Rebs: Fernandes 8 Asts: Taylor 4		Pts: Deleon 21; Rebs: Montas 6 Asts: Pena 3

Santiago de los Caballeros, Dominican Republic

17 January 2016

Boxscore

Leones de Quilpué (Chile)	83–100	(Brazil) Mogi das Cruzes
Scoring by quarter: 25–20, 20–26, 20–31, 18–23
Pts: Johnson 22; Rebs: Johnson 7 Asts: Amor 3		Pts: Stallworth 21; Rebs: Fernandes 6 Asts: Silva 4

Santiago de los Caballeros, Dominican Republic

17 January 2016

Boxscore

Metros de Santiago (Dominican Republic)	68–88	(Uruguay) Malvín
Scoring by quarter: 18–23, 21–27, 10–27, 19–11
Pts: Deleon 16; Rebs: Deleon 6 Asts: Deleon 3		Pts: Hoskin 21; Rebs: Calfani 9 Asts: Calfani 4

Santiago de los Caballeros, Dominican Republic

=== Group B ===
Pos	Team	Pld	W	L	PF	PA	PD	Pts	Qualification
1	(Brazil) Bauru	3	3	0	260	211	+49	6	Advanced to quarterfinals
2	(Argentina) Quimsa (H)	3	2	1	249	192	+57	5	Advanced to quarterfinals
3	(Venezuela) Marinos de Anzoategui	3	1	2	249	242	+7	4	
4	(Nicaragua) Toros del Norte	3	0	3	180	293	−113	3	

Source: ligamericas.com
(H) Hosts

22 January 2016

Boxscore

Bauru (Brazil)	84–82	(Venezuela) Marinos de Anzoategui
Scoring by quarter: 20–16, 19–19, 23–25, 22–22
Pts: Meindl 16; Rebs: Andrade 10; Asts: Garcia 5		Pts: Gabriel 23; Rebs: Gabriel 14; Asts: Fisher 4

Santiago del Estero, Argentina

22 January 2016

Boxscore

Quimsa (Argentina)	97–45	(Nicaragua) Toros del Norte
Scoring by quarter: 21–14, 12–7, 31–12, 33–12
Pts: Jackson 18; Rebs: Romano 8 Asts: Deck 7		Pts: Sundov 12; Rebs: Lopez 5 Asts: Jimenez 2

Santiago del Estero, Argentina

23 January 2016

Boxscore

Toros del Norte (Nicaragua)	58–100	(Brazil) Bauru
Scoring by quarter: 14–22, 16–28, 16–28, 12–22
Pts: Sundov 16; Rebs: Sundov 16; Asts: Gonzalez 3		Pts: Andrade 18; Rebs: Andrade 6 Asts: Fischer 10

Santiago del Estero, Argentina

23 January 2016

Boxscore

Marinos de Anzoategui (Venezuela)	71–81	(Argentina) Quimsa
Scoring by quarter: 21–22, 20–19, 14–18, 16–22
Pts: Fisher 18; Rebs: Siler 10; Asts: Rivera 6		Pts: Deck 25; Rebs: Romano 6 Asts: Jackson 6

Santiago del Estero, Argentina

24 January 2016

Boxscore

Toros del Norte (Nicaragua)	77–96	(Venezuela) Marinos de Anzoategui
Scoring by quarter: 18–32, 15–20, 27–27, 17–17
Pts: Sundov 31; Rebs: Sundov 8 Asts: Gonzalez 5		Pts: Materan 21; Rebs: Gabriel 10; Asts: Fisher 7

Santiago del Estero, Argentina

24 January 2016

Boxscore

Quimsa (Argentina)	71–76	(Brazil) Bauru
Scoring by quarter: 13–16, 14–17, 25–24, 19–19
Pts: Deck 15; Rebs: Clark 9 Asts: Clark 3		Pts: Fischer 24; Rebs: Fischer 7 Asts: Fischer 9

Santiago del Estero, Argentina

=== Group C ===
Pos	Team	Pld	W	L	PF	PA	PD	Pts	Qualification
1	(Brazil) Flamengo	3	3	0	209	179	+30	6	Advanced to quarterfinals
2	(Panama) Correcaminos Colón (H)	3	2	1	195	193	+2	5	Advanced to quarterfinals
3	(Argentina) Gimnasia Indalo	3	1	2	191	178	+13	4	
4	(Colombia) Águilas de Tunja	3	0	3	183	228	−45	3	

Source: ligamericas.com
(H) Hosts

29 January 2016

Boxscore

Flamengo (Brazil)	66–58	(Argentina) Gimnasia Indalo
Scoring by quarter: 21–15, 14–13, 14–27, 17–3
Pts: Marquinhos 15; Rebs: Meyinsse 6 Asts: Robinson 3		Pts: Sandes 17; Rebs: Clancy 10; Asts: Mainoldi 3

Panama City, Panama

29 January 2016

Boxscore

Correcaminos Colón (Panama)	74–71	(Colombia) Águilas de Tunja
Scoring by quarter: 16–18, 22–14, 22–22, 14–17
Pts: Pinnock 23; Rebs: Larry 9 Asts: Munoz 8		Pts: Rodriguez 19; Rebs: Jackson 9 Asts: Restrepo 7

Panama City, Panama

30 January 2016

Boxscore

Águilas de Tunja (Colombia)	60–75	(Brazil) Flamengo
Scoring by quarter: 15–15, 18–10, 9–26, 18–24
Pts: Rodriguez 28; Rebs: Arboleda 9 Asts: Rodriguez 7		Pts: Marquinhos 21; Rebs: Meyinsse 6 Asts: Luz 7

Panama City, Panama

30 January 2016

Boxscore

Gimnasia Indalo (Argentina)	54–60	(Panama) Correcaminos Colón
Scoring by quarter: 9–11, 18–16, 19–19, 8–14
Pts: Schattmann 17; Rebs: Mainoldi 10; Asts: Mainoldi 3		Pts: Gaskins 14; Rebs: Larry 6 Asts: Munoz 4

Panama City, Panama

31 January 2016

Boxscore

Águilas de Tunja (Colombia)	52–79	(Argentina) Gimnasia Indalo
Scoring by quarter: 18–18, 6–23, 12–21, 16–17
Pts: Jackson 18; Rebs: Hinestroza 7 Asts: Restrepo 5		Pts: Mainoldi 18; Rebs: Mainoldi 9 Asts: Mainoldi 8

Panama City, Panama

31 January 2016

Boxscore

Correcaminos Colón (Panama)	61–68	(Brazil) Flamengo
Scoring by quarter: 20–17, 11–13, 13–21, 17–17
Pts: Gaskins 17; Rebs: Larry 4 Asts: Gaskins 6		Pts: Ramon 20; Rebs: Batista 5 Asts: Luz 6

Panama City, Panama

=== Group D ===
Pos	Team	Pld	W	L	PF	PA	PD	Pts	Qualification
1	(Venezuela) Guaros de Lara (H)	3	2	1	256	225	+31	5	Advanced to quarterfinals
2	(Brazil) Brasília	3	2	1	267	227	+40	5	Advanced to quarterfinals
3	(Puerto Rico) Capitanes de Arecibo	3	2	1	274	256	+18	5	
4	(Cuba) Capitalinos de la Habana	3	0	3	196	285	−89	3	

Source: ligamericas.com
(H) Hosts

5 February 2016

Boxscore

Brasília (Brazil)	93–94	(Puerto Rico) Capitanes de Arecibo
Scoring by quarter: 25–24, 17–21, 25–31, 26–18
Pts: Evandro 33; Rebs: Coimbra 7 Asts: Pinheiro 3		Pts: Huertas 29; Rebs: Balkman 9 Asts: Cruz 4

Barquisimeto, Venezuela

5 February 2016

Boxscore

Guaros de Lara (Venezuela)	91–65	(Cuba) Capitalinos de la Habana
Scoring by quarter: 24–16, 19–17, 24–8, 24–24
Pts: Wilkins 23; Rebs: Echenique 8 Asts: Urdaneta 6		Pts: Guzman 20; Rebs: Haiti 10; Asts: Oliva 4

Barquisimeto, Venezuela

6 February 2016

Boxscore

Capitalinos de la Habana (Cuba)	60–99	(Brazil) Brasília
Scoring by quarter: 13–26, 10–24, 19–17, 18–32
Pts: Haiti 16; Rebs: Haiti 14; Asts: Torres 2		Pts: Cipolini 17; Rebs: Pinheiro 10; Asts: Chiantia 8

Barquisimeto, Venezuela

6 February 2016

Boxscore

Capitanes de Arecibo (Puerto Rico)	85–92	(Venezuela) Guaros de Lara
Scoring by quarter: 22–18, 25–22, 18–32, 20–20
Pts: Diaz 24; Rebs: Wallace 6 Asts: Cruz 4		Pts: Graham 23; Rebs: Wilkins 7 Asts: Wilkins 3

Barquisimeto, Venezuela

7 February 2016

Boxscore

Capitalinos de la Habana (Cuba)	71–95	(Puerto Rico) Capitanes de Arecibo
Scoring by quarter: 15–28, 17–24, 19–15, 20–28
Pts: Oliva 14; Rebs: Guzman 9 Asts: Muniz 6		Pts: Jones 21; Rebs: Wallace 12; Asts: Diaz 9

Barquisimeto, Venezuela

7 February 2016

Boxscore

Guaros de Lara (Venezuela)	73–75	(Brazil) Brasília
Scoring by quarter: 23–19, 14–20, 13–16, 23–20
Pts: Graham 20; Rebs: Wilkins 7 Asts: Colmenares 3		Pts: Pilar 15; Rebs: Pilar 10; Asts: Chiantia 5

Barquisimeto, Venezuela

== Quarterfinals ==
=== Group E ===
Pos	Team	Pld	W	L	PF	PA	PD	Pts	Qualification
1	(Brazil) Mogi das Cruzes	3	2	1	219	192	+27	5	Advanced to Final 4
2	(Brazil) Bauru (H)	3	2	1	228	215	+13	5	Advanced to Final 4
3	(Argentina) Quimsa	3	2	1	207	196	+11	5	
4	(Uruguay) Malvín	3	0	3	190	241	−51	3	

Source: ligamericas.com
(H) Hosts

19 February 2016

Boxscore

Quimsa (Argentina)	69–67	(Brazil) Mogi das Cruzes
Scoring by quarter: 18–19, 18–16, 17–17, 16–15
Pts: Romano 18; Rebs: Battle 8 Asts: Garcia 3		Pts: Pereira 19; Rebs: Curnell 7 Asts: Curnell 4

Bauru, Brazil

19 February 2016

Boxscore

Bauru (Brazil)	89–77	(Uruguay) Malvín
Scoring by quarter: 26–14, 22–20, 24–19, 17–24
Pts: Garcia 22; Rebs: Garcia 5 Asts: Fischer 10		Pts: Calfani 14; Rebs: Calfani 4 Asts: Winston 5

Bauru, Brazil

20 February 2016

Boxscore

Malvín (Uruguay)	56–75	(Argentina) Quimsa
Scoring by quarter: 13–16, 10–19, 17–21, 16–19
Pts: Hoskin 17; Rebs: Hoskin 6 Asts: Mazzarino 2		Pts: Jackson 12; Rebs: Jackson 6 Asts: Jackson 5

Bauru, Brazil

20 February 2016

Boxscore

Mogi das Cruzes (Brazil)	75–66	(Brazil) Bauru
Scoring by quarter: 16–13, 19–23, 23–19, 17–11
Pts: Taylor 20; Rebs: Curnell 8 Asts: Stallworth 2		Pts: Day 15; Rebs: Fischer 6 Asts: Fischer 8

Bauru, Brazil

21 February 2016

Boxscore

Mogi das Cruzes (Brazil)	77–57	(Uruguay) Malvín
Scoring by quarter: 13–11, 18–19, 22–16, 24–11
Pts: Stallworth 17; Rebs: Curnell 12; Asts: Taylor 3		Pts: Hoskin 14; Rebs: Calfani 6 Asts: Calfani 2

Bauru, Brazil

21 February 2016

Boxscore

Bauru (Brazil)	73–63	(Argentina) Quimsa
Scoring by quarter: 19–13, 15–18, 21–15, 18–17
Pts: Fischer 26; Rebs: Garcia 7 Asts: Fischer 7		Pts: Romano 19; Rebs: Battle 8 Asts: Perez 4

Bauru, Brazil

=== Group F ===
Pos	Team	Pld	W	L	PF	PA	PD	Pts	Qualification
1	(Brazil) Flamengo	3	2	1	277	268	+9	5	Advanced to Final 4
2	(Venezuela) Guaros de Lara (H)	3	2	1	277	244	+33	5	Advanced to Final 4
3	(Brazil) Brasília	3	2	1	276	271	+5	5	
4	(Panama) Correcaminos Colón	3	0	3	248	295	−47	3	

Source: ligamericas.com
(H) Hosts

26 February 2016

Boxscore

Flamengo (Brazil)	106–93	(Brazil) Brasília
Scoring by quarter: 23–16, 14–23, 31–31, 38–23
Pts: Machado 15; Rebs: Machado 4 Asts: Luz 7		Pts: Evandro 22; Rebs: Rudson 6 Asts: Rudson 4

Barquisimeto, Venezuela

26 February 2016

Boxscore

Guaros de Lara (Venezuela)	108–77	(Panama) Correcaminos Colón
Scoring by quarter: 29–22, 29–15, 25–25, 25–15
Pts: Wilkins 18; Rebs: Graterol 10; Asts: Taylor 5		Pts: Larry 14; Rebs: Moss 5 Asts: Reed 6

Barquisimeto, Venezuela

27 February 2016

Boxscore

Correcaminos Colón (Panama)	83–84	(Brazil) Flamengo
Scoring by quarter: 14–20, 22–15, 25–18, 22–31
Pts: Larry 18; Rebs: Gaskins 10; Asts: Gaskins 9		Pts: Machado 21; Rebs: Mineiro 10; Asts: Ramon 8

Barquisimeto, Venezuela

27 February 2016

Boxscore

Brasília (Brazil)	80–77	(Venezuela) Guaros de Lara
Scoring by quarter: 21–13, 23–14, 12–22, 24–28
Pts: Giovannoni 21; Rebs: Giovannoni 14; Asts: Evandro 5		Pts: Taylor 20; Rebs: Colmenares 7 Asts: Taylor 6

Barquisimeto, Venezuela

28 February 2016

Boxscore

Brasília (Brazil)	103–88	(Panama) Correcaminos Colón
Scoring by quarter: 26–26, 30–25, 22–16, 25–21
Pts: Giovannoni 18; Rebs: Cipolini 6 Asts: Chiantia 11		Pts: Moss 20; Rebs: Pinnock 6 Asts: Munoz 7

Barquisimeto, Venezuela

28 February 2016

Boxscore

Guaros de Lara (Venezuela)	92–87	(Brazil) Flamengo
Scoring by quarter: 26–16, 30–19, 24–25, 12–27
Pts: Taylor 19; Rebs: Echenique 8 Asts: Taylor 6		Pts: Batista 21; Rebs: Mineiro 6 Asts: Luz 6

Barquisimeto, Venezuela

== Final 4 ==
Semifinals
11 March
(Brazil) Flamengo	81
(Brazil) Bauru	83
11 March
(Brazil) Mogi das Cruzes	73
(Venezuela) Guaros de Lara	81

Grand Final
12 March
(Brazil) Bauru	79
(Venezuela) Guaros de Lara	84
Third-place game
12 March
(Brazil) Flamengo	71
(Brazil) Mogi das Cruzes	73

=== Semifinals ===
11 March 2016

Boxscore

Flamengo (Brazil)	81–83	(Brazil) Bauru
Scoring by quarter: 24–24, 21–15, 21–16, 15–28
Pts: Olivinha 15; Rebs: Meyinsse 7 Asts: Luz 6		Pts: Day 17; Rebs: Becker 8 Asts: Fischer 7

Barquisimeto, Venezuela

11 March 2016

Boxscore

Mogi das Cruzes (Brazil)	73–81	(Venezuela) Guaros de Lara
Scoring by quarter: 17–17, 21–17, 15–21, 20–26
Pts: Stallworth 31; Rebs: Stallworth 11; Asts: Taylor 5		Pts: Taylor 28; Rebs: Wilkins 9 Asts: Taylor 4

Barquisimeto, Venezuela

=== Third-place game ===
12 March 2016

Boxscore

Flamengo (Brazil)	71–73	(Brazil) Mogi das Cruzes
Scoring by quarter: 18–17, 14–22, 20–19, 19–15
Pts: Marquinhos 16; Rebs: Batista 8 Asts: Ramon 4		Pts: Stallworth 19; Rebs: Prestes 8 Asts: Silva 7

Barquisimeto, Venezuela

=== Grand Final ===
12 March 2016

Boxscore

Bauru (Brazil)	79–84	(Venezuela) Guaros de Lara
Scoring by quarter: 23–16, 10–17, 24–26, 22–25
Pts: Becker 19; Rebs: Garcia 9 Asts: Garcia 6		Pts: Wilkins 20; Rebs: Bethelmy 8 Asts: Taylor 3

Barquisimeto, Venezuela
