= Mike Rostampour =

Iranian-American basketball player

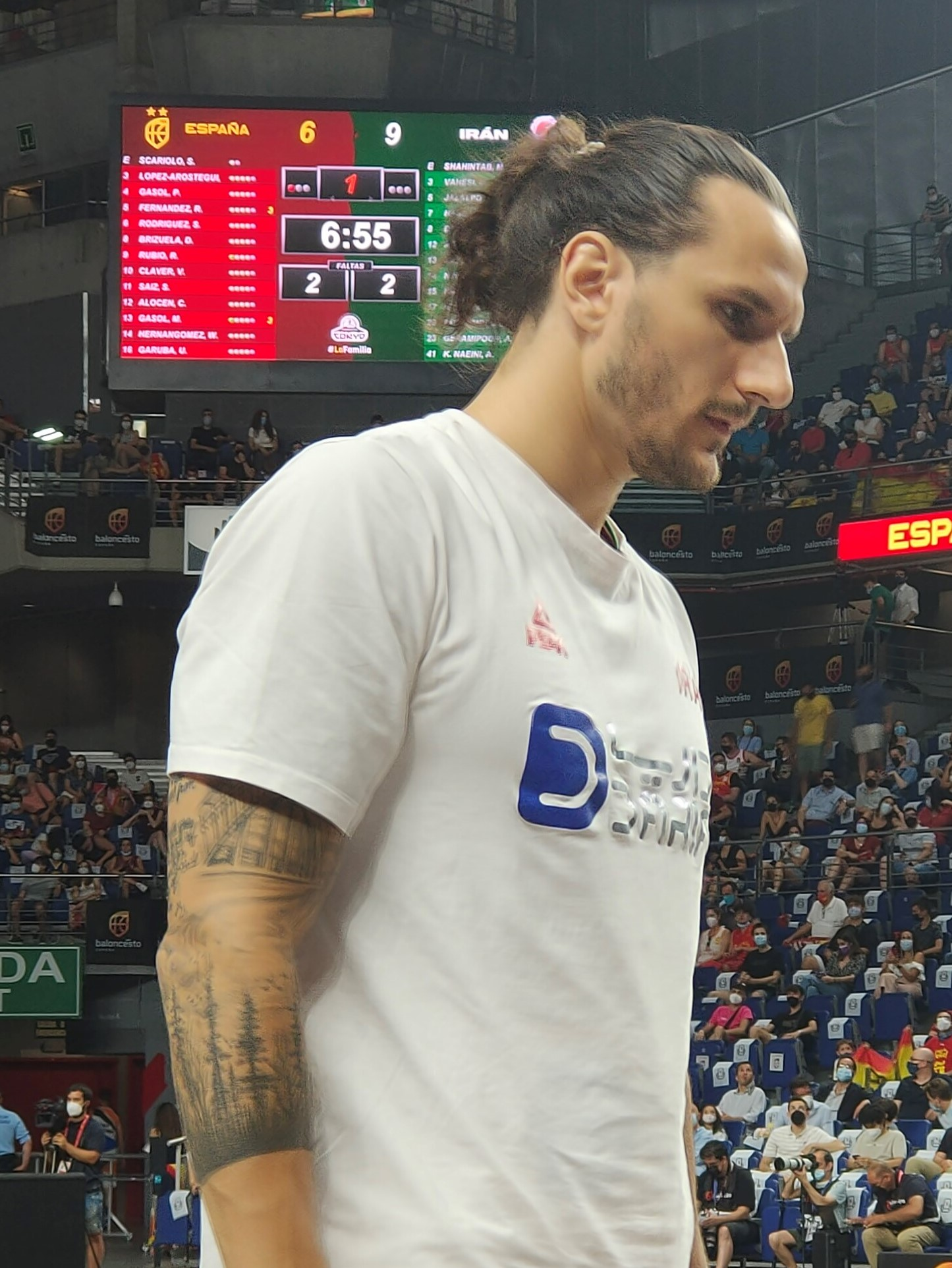

No. 0 – Shahrdari Gorgan
- Position: Power forward
- League: Iran Superleague

Personal information
- Born: December 20, 1991 (age 34) Minnesota, United States
- Listed height: 6 ft 8 in (2.03 m)
- Listed weight: 230 lb (104 kg)

Career information
- High school: Henry Sibley (Mendota Heights, Minnesota)
- College: Grayson County College (2010-2011); St. Cloud State (2011-2012); Omaha (2012-2015)

Career history
- 2015–2017: Prievidza
- 2016–2017: Cape Breton Highlanders
- 2017–2018: Caballeros de Culiacan
- 2018: San Salvador
- 2018–2019: Sanat Naft Abadan
- 2019–2020: Chemidor Qom
- 2020–2021: Shahrdari Gorgan

Mike Rostampour OLY (born December 20, 1991) is an Iranian-American professional basketball player for the Iranian national team.

== Career ==
Rostampour played in the 2018 FIBA Americas League for San Salvador BC. He competed as a member of the Iran National team in the 2019 FIBA World Cup in China. Rostampour qualified for and competed in the 2020 Tokyo Olympics, where he represented Iran in the first two games against the Czech Republic and the United States.

== Career statistics ==
=== College ===
Year	Team	GP	GS	MPG	FG%	3P%	FT%	RPG	APG	SPG	BPG	PPG
2011–12	St. Cloud State	27	27	19.7	.482	.520	.684	4.7	1.0	.5	.6	7.8
2012–13	Omaha	Transfer										
2013–14	Omaha	32	31	20.7	.554	.391	.673	7.5	.4	.8	.3	9.2
2014–15	Omaha	29	29	24.4	.448	.393	.711	7.7	.4	.9	.5	10.2
Career (NCAA DI)		61	60	22.5	.494	.392	.690	7.6	.4	.8	.4	9.7
Career (NCAA DII)		27	27	19.7	.482	.520	.684	4.7	1.0	.5	.6	7.8
