= 2018 FIBA Americas League =

FIBA Americas League
- Season: 2018
- Dates: 19 January – 25 March 2018
- Games played: 40
- Teams: 16

Finals
- Champions: (Argentina) San Lorenzo (1st title)
- Runners-up: (Brazil) Mogi das Cruzes
- Third place: (Argentina) Regatas Corrientes
- Fourth place: (Argentina) Estudiantes Concordia

Awards
- Grand Final MVP: Gabriel Deck

Statistical leaders
Points	(Argentina) Gabriel Deck	19.1
Rebounds	(United States) Tyrone Curnell	8.1
Assists	(Argentina) Nicolás Aguirre	7.5

The 2018 FIBA Americas League was the 11th edition of the top-tier level intercontinental professional club basketball competition in the Americas, the FIBA Americas League. Sixteen teams from across the Americas competed over three rounds, to determine the champion.

== Team allocation ==
	Teams entering in this round	Teams advancing from previous round
Group phase (16 teams)	16 qualified teams	
Semifinal Phase (8 teams)		4 group winners from the group phase; 4 group runners-up from the group phase
Final Four (4 teams)		2 group winners from the semifinal phase; 2 group runners-up from the semifinal phase

=== Teams ===
Group phase
(Argentina) San Lorenzo (1st)	(Brazil) Bauru (1st)	(Mexico) Fuerza Regia (1st)	(Uruguay) Hebraica Macabi (1st)
(Argentina) Regatas Corrientes (2nd)	(Brazil) Paulistano (2nd)	(Mexico) Soles de Mexicali (2nd)	(El Salvador) San Salvador
(Argentina) Estudiantes Concordia (5th)	(Brazil) Mogi das Cruzes (WC)	(Puerto Rico) Capitanes de Arecibo (2nd)	(Venezuela) Guaros de Lara^{TH} (1st)
(Argentina) Ferro (WC)	(Panama) Correcaminos Colon (1st)	(Puerto Rico) Leones de Ponce (4th)	(Chile) Español de Talca (1st)

The labels in the parentheses show how each team qualified for the place of its starting round (TH: Americas League title holders):

- LC: Qualified through a licensed club with a long-term licence
- 1st, 2nd, etc.: League position after Playoffs

Notes

Note Wild Cards (WC): As two Venezuelan sides faced financial troubles, FIBA invited Mogi das Cruzes and Ferro to the competition.

== Group phase ==
Mexican venues of the 2018 FIBA Americas League.
Yellow: Group A.
Venues of the 2018 FIBA Americas League.
Pink: Group B. Red: Group C, Group F. Green: Group D. Orange: Group E, Final Four.

Sixteen teams participated in the group phase, in which each team faced the other teams in the group once. Each group tournament was held at the arena of a host team. The two highest-placed teams in each group advance to the semifinal phase. Games were played from 19 January until 11 February 2018.

=== Group A ===
Venue: Monterrey, Mexico

Pos	Team	Pld	W	L	PF	PA	PD	Pts	Qualification
1	(Argentina) Ferro	3	3	0	265	228	+37	6	Advance to semifinal phase
2	(Mexico) Fuerza Regia (H)	3	2	1	236	236	0	5	Advance to semifinal phase
3	(Mexico) Soles de Mexicali	3	1	2	265	259	+6	4	
4	(Puerto Rico) Capitanes de Arecibo	3	0	3	241	284	−43	3	

Source: FIBA
(H) Hosts

=== Group B ===
Venue: Talca, Chile

Pos	Team	Pld	W	L	PF	PA	PD	Pts	Qualification
1	(Argentina) San Lorenzo	3	3	0	304	229	+75	6	Advance to semifinal phase
2	(Brazil) Mogi das Cruzes	3	2	1	288	256	+32	5	Advance to semifinal phase
3	(Brazil) Paulistano	3	1	2	262	256	+6	4	
4	(Chile) Español de Talca (H)	3	0	3	202	315	−113	3	

Source: FIBA
(H) Hosts

=== Group C ===
Venue: Corrientes, Argentina

Pos	Team	Pld	W	L	PF	PA	PD	Pts	Qualification
1	(Argentina) Regatas Corrientes (H)	3	3	0	258	211	+47	6	Advance to semifinal phase
2	(Argentina) Estudiantes Concordia	3	2	1	214	200	+14	5	Advance to semifinal phase
3	(Puerto Rico) Leones de Ponce	3	1	2	228	240	−12	4	
4	(Uruguay) Hebraica Macabi	3	0	3	196	245	−49	3	

Source: FIBA
(H) Hosts

=== Group D ===
Venue: Bauru, Brazil

Pos	Team	Pld	W	L	PF	PA	PD	Pts	Qualification
1	(Venezuela) Guaros de Lara	3	3	0	275	231	+44	6	Advance to semifinal phase
2	(Brazil) Bauru (H)	3	2	1	245	210	+35	5	Advance to semifinal phase
3	(Panama) Correcaminos Colon	3	1	2	199	236	−37	4	
4	(El Salvador) San Salvador	3	0	3	214	256	−42	3	

Source: FIBA
(H) Hosts

== Semifinal phase ==
The eight teams which advance from the group phase, played in this stage in which each team faced the other teams in the group once. Each group tournament was held at the arena of a host team. The two highest-placed teams in each group advance to the final four. Games were played from 2 March until 11 March 2018.

=== Group E ===
Venue: Buenos Aires, Argentina

Pos	Team	Pld	W	L	PF	PA	PD	Pts	Qualification
1	(Argentina) San Lorenzo (H)	3	3	0	224	188	+36	6	Advance to Final Four
2	(Brazil) Mogi das Cruzes	3	2	1	213	205	+8	5	Advance to Final Four
3	(Argentina) Ferro	3	1	2	213	217	−4	4	
4	(Mexico) Fuerza Regia	3	0	3	198	238	−40	3	

Source: FIBA
(H) Hosts

=== Group F ===
Venue: Corrientes, Argentina

Pos	Team	Pld	W	L	PF	PA	PD	Pts	Qualification
1	(Argentina) Regatas Corrientes (H)	3	2	1	251	224	+27	5	Advance to Final Four
2	(Argentina) Estudiantes Concordia	3	2	1	232	252	−20	5	Advance to Final Four
3	(Brazil) Bauru	3	1	2	253	262	−9	4	
4	(Venezuela) Guaros de Lara	3	1	2	229	227	+2	4	

Source: FIBA
(H) Hosts

== Final Four ==
The final four tournament decided the champion of the 2018 season. The tournament was held from 24 March and 25 March 2018 in the Polideportivo Roberto Pando in Buenos Aires, Argentina.

Semifinals
24 March
(Argentina) San Lorenzo	101
(Argentina) Estudiantes Concordia	71
24 March
(Brazil) Mogi das Cruzes	78
(Argentina) Regatas Corrientes	74

Grand Final
25 March
(Argentina) San Lorenzo	79
(Brazil) Mogi das Cruzes	71
Third place
25 March
(Argentina) Estudiantes Concordia	59
(Argentina) Regatas Corrientes	60

== Statistical leaders ==
Category	Player	Club	Average	Games	Total
Points	(Argentina) Gabriel Deck	(Argentina) San Lorenzo	19.1	8	153
Rebounds	(United States) Tyrone Curnell	(Brazil) Mogi das Cruzes	8.1	8	65
Assists	(Argentina) Nicolás Aguirre	(Argentina) San Lorenzo	7.5	8	60
Blocks	(Cuba) Javier Justiz	(Argentina) San Lorenzo	1.0	8	8
Steals	(United States) Clay Tucker	(Argentina) Estudiantes Concordia	1.8	8	14
FT%	(United States) Kendall Anthony	(Brazil) Bauru	92.6%	6	25/27
3P%	(United States) Kendall Anthony	(Brazil) Bauru	69.2%	6	9/13
Free throws	(Argentina) Gabriel Deck	(Argentina) San Lorenzo	5.8	8	46
Three-point field goals	(United States) Clay Tucker	(Argentina) Estudiantes Concordia	2.9	8	23
