= Domo Bolivariano de Barquisimeto =

National historical monument of Venezuela in Barquisimeto

Domo Bolivariano
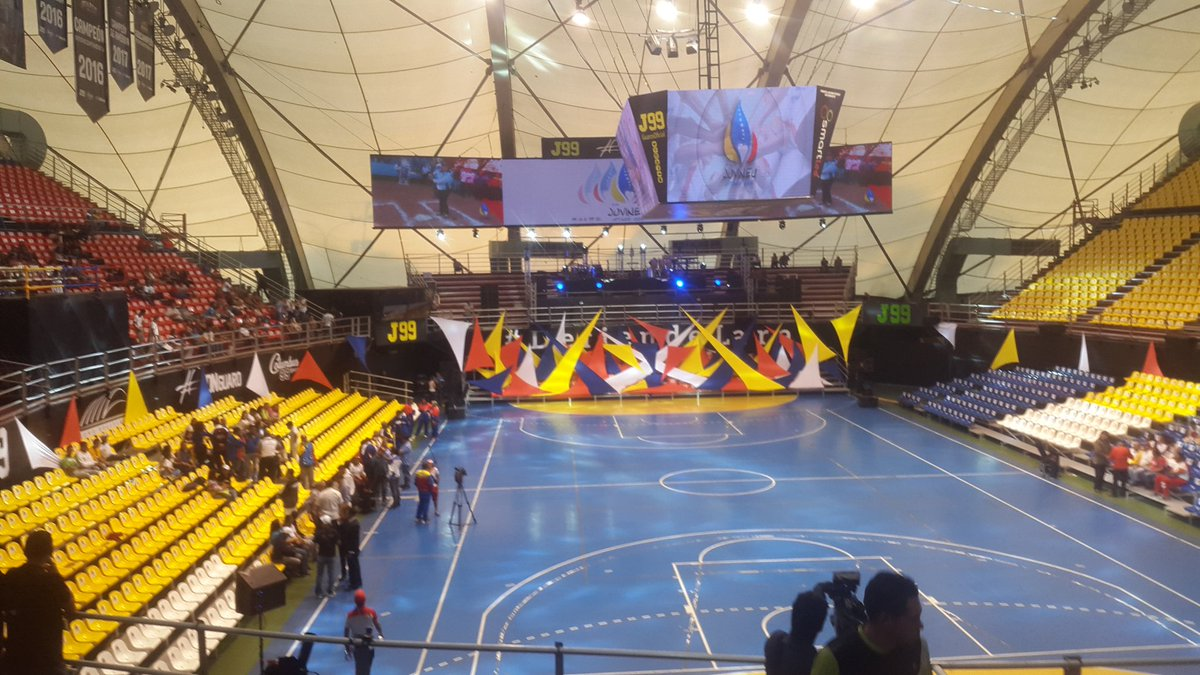
- The interior of Domo Bolivariano.
- Interactive map of Domo Bolivariano
- Full name: Domo Bolivariano de Barquisimeto
- Location: Barquisimeto, Venezuela
- Coordinates: 10.080322°N 69.330833°W
- Capacity: Basketball: 10,000

Construction
- Opened: 1982

Tenant
- Guaros de Lara

Domo Bolivariano de Barquisimeto, or simply Domo Bolivariano, is an indoor sporting arena that is located in Barquisimeto, Venezuela. The arena is named in honor of Simón Bolívar. The seating capacity of the arena is 10,000, and it is mainly used to host basketball games, as well as volleyball, boxing, and handball competitions.

== History ==
Domo Bolivariano has been used as the home arena of the Venezuelan League professional basketball club, Guaros de Lara. The arena hosted the Grand Finals of the 2016 FIBA Americas League, and the 2017 FIBA Americas League.

== See also ==
- List of basketball arenas
