= Heissler Guillent =

Venezuelan basketball player

Personal information
- Born: 17 December 1986 (age 39) Caracas, Venezuela
- Listed height: 6 ft 1.25 in (1.86 m)
- Listed weight: 210 lb (95 kg)

Career information
- Playing career: 2006–present
- Position: Point guard

Career history
- 2006–2009: Guaros de Lara
- 2009: Arrieros de Antioquia
- 2009–2010: Fuerza Regia
- 2010: Guaros de Lara
- 2011–2012: Bucaneros de La Guaira
- 2012: Guaros de Lara
- 2012: Leones de Santo Domingo
- 2012–2013: Estrellas Occidentales
- 2013–2014: Academia de la Montaña
- 2013–2019: Guaros de Lara
- 2019–2020: Astros de Jalisco
- 2021–2022: Guaiqueríes de Margarita
- 2023–2023: Guaros de Lara
- 2023–2024: Franca Basquetebol Clube
- 2024–2025: El Calor de Cancún

Career highlights
- FIBA Intercontinental Cup champion (2016); 2× FIBA Americas League champion (2016, 2017); FIBA South American League champion (2017); FIBA South American League MVP (2017); Venezuelan League champion (2017); 2× Venezuelan League MVP (2011, 2023); Venezuelan League Rookie of the Year (2008)
Medals
Men's basketball
Representing Venezuela
FIBA South American Championship
Gold medal – first place	2014 Venezuela
FIBA AmeriCup
Gold medal – first place	2015 Mexico

Heissler Rafael Guillent Ecker (born 17 December 1986) is a Venezuelan professional basketball player for Franca Basquetebol Clube and Venezuela.

== Professional career ==
In his pro club career, Guillent has played in both the South American 2nd-tier level FIBA South American League, and the South American top-tier level FIBA Americas League.

In October 2019, Guillent signed with Astros de Jalisco in Mexico. Guillent led the LNBP in assists.

In February 2021, Guillent signed with Guaiqueríes de Margarita in Venezuela.

In September 2023, Guillent signed with Franca Basquetebol Clube in Brazil.

== National team career ==
Guillent has been a member of the senior men's Venezuelan national basketball team. With Venezuela's senior national team, he has played at the following tournaments: the 2011 FIBA Americas Championship, the 2013 FIBA Americas Championship, the 2014 South American Championship, where he won a gold medal, the 2015 Pan American Games, and the 2015 FIBA Americas Championship, where he won a gold medal, and was named to the All-Tournament Team.

He also played at the 2016 Summer Olympics.
