= Néstor Colmenares =

Venezuelan basketball player (born 1987)

No. 43 – Nacional
- Position: Power forward
- League: Liga Uruguaya de Básquetbol

Personal information
- Born: September 5, 1987 (age 39) Caracas, Venezuela
- Listed height: 6 ft 8 in (2.03 m)
- Listed weight: 243 lb (110 kg)

Career information
- College: Indian Hills CC (2005–2007); Campbellsville (2007–2010)
- NBA draft: 2010: undrafted

Career history
- 2006: Cocodrilos de Caracas
- 2011: Unión de Sunchales
- 2011–2012: Huracanes de Tampico
- 2012: Cocodrilos de Caracas
- 2012: Centauros de Apure
- 2013: Estrellas Orientales
- 2013–2014: Abejas de Guanajuato
- 2014–2015: Trouville
- 2015: Cocodrilos de Caracas
- 2015–2019: Guaros de Lara
- 2019–2020: Maccabi Haifa
- 2020: U-BT Cluj-Napoca
- 2020–2021: Instituto de Córdoba
- 2021: Cocodrilos de Caracas
- 2021–2022: Club Atlético Goes
- 2022: Trotamundos de Carabobo
- 2022–2023: Club Atlético Goes
- 2023: Trotamundos de Carabobo
- 2023: Halcones Rojos Veracruz
- 2023–2024: Gladiadores de Anzoátegui
- 2024: Trotamundos de Carabobo
- 2024–present: Nacional

Career highlights
- FIBA Intercontinental Cup champion (2016); 2× FIBA Americas League champion (2016, 2017)
Medals
Men's basketball
Representing Venezuela
FIBA South American Championship
| Gold medal – first place | 2014 Venezuela |
| Gold medal – first place | 2016 Venezuela |
FIBA AmeriCup
| Gold medal – first place | 2015 Mexico |

Néstor Enrique Colmenares Uzcategui (born September 5, 1987) is a Venezuelan professional basketball player for Nacional of the Liga Uruguaya de Básquetbol. He is also a member of the senior Venezuela National Team. A power forward, his nickname is "La Bestia" ("The Beast"), He is known as a proficient rebounder.

== College career ==
Colmenares played college basketball at Indian Hills C.C. (JUCO), and at Campbellsville (NAIA).

== Professional career ==
In his pro career, Colmenares has played in both the 2nd-tier South American League, and the 1st-tier FIBA Americas League. He won the 2016 FIBA Americas League championship with Guaros de Lara.

On November 5, 2019, Colmenares signed with Maccabi Haifa of the Israeli Premier League. He averaged 10.7 points and 9.2 rebounds per game. On August 30, 2020, Colmenares signed with U-BT Cluj-Napoca of the Liga Națională.

== National team career ==
With the senior men's Venezuela national basketball team, Colmenares has played at the following tournaments: the 2011 FIBA Americas Championship, the 2013 FIBA Americas Championship, the 2014 South American Championship, where he won a gold medal, the 2015 Pan American Games, the 2015 FIBA Americas Championship, where he won a gold medal, the 2016 South American Championship, where he won a gold medal, and the 2016 Summer Olympics.
