= Club La Unión =

La Unión
- Nickname: La U
- Leagues: Liga Nacional de Básquetbol; FIBA Americas League
- Founded: 5 August 2004; 22 years ago
- Arena: Estadio Cincuentenario
- Location: Formosa, Formosa Province, Argentina
- Team colors: Light blue and dark blue
- President: María Alesi
- Head coach: Guillermo Narvarte
Home	Away

Club La Unión (also known as La Unión de Formosa) is a sports club based on the city of Formosa, Argentina. The club is known for both its basketball and volleyball teams.

Established in 2004, La Unión has won two Liga Argentina titles, and was runner-up in the 2015–16 Liga Nacional de Básquet season, where they lost the title to San Lorenzo.

== Basketball ==
=== Current roster ===
La Unión roster
Players
Coaches

Pos.	No.	Nat.	Name	Ht.	Age
PG	0	(United States)	Beavers, Brandon	1.88 m (6 ft 2 in)	25 – 15 May 2001
SG	2	(Mexico) (United States)	Nuno, Tomás	1.95 m (6 ft 5 in)	28 – 2 January 1998
G	4	(Argentina)	Marina, Mariano	1.85 m (6 ft 1 in)	27 – 13 May 1999
PF	6	(Argentina)	Acevedo, Sebastián	2.00 m (6 ft 7 in)	35 – 13 September 1990
SF	7	(Argentina)	Elsener, Alexis	1.92 m (6 ft 4 in)	38 – 23 February 1988
PG	8	(Argentina)	Machuca, Jonathan	1.85 m (6 ft 1 in)	37 – 21 March 1989
SG	10	(Argentina)	Harina, Federico	1.85 m (6 ft 1 in)	35 – 6 January 1991
C	12	(Paraguay)	Páez, Hugo	2.03 m (6 ft 8 in)	21 – 1 January 2005
G	14	(Argentina)	Genitti, Maximo	1.90 m (6 ft 3 in)	20 – 3 December 2005
C	15	(Venezuela)	Graterol, Windi	2.06 m (6 ft 9 in)	39 – 10 September 1986
PF/C	17	(Argentina)	Alorda, Franco	2.03 m (6 ft 8 in)	27 – 24 February 1999
PG	21	(Argentina)	Spano, Tomás	1.84 m (6 ft 0 in)	28 – 5 March 1998
G	44	(Argentina)	Perez, Mateo	1.93 m (6 ft 4 in)	24 – 17 July 2002

Head coach

- (Argentina) Gonzalo García

Assistant coach(es)

- (Argentina) Daniel Cano

Legend

- (C) Team captain
- Injured

- Roster
Updated: 2020-01-01

=== Notable players ===
Note: Flags indicate national team eligibility at FIBA-sanctioned events. Players may hold other non-FIBA nationalities not displayed.

Criteria

To appear in this section a player must have either:

- Set a club record or won an individual award while at the club
- Played at least one official international match for their national team at any time
- Played at least one official NBA match at any time.

- (Colombia) Romário Roque

== Titles ==
- La Liga Argentina (2): 2004–05, 2008–09
