= Gregory Echenique =

Venezuelan basketball player (born 1990)

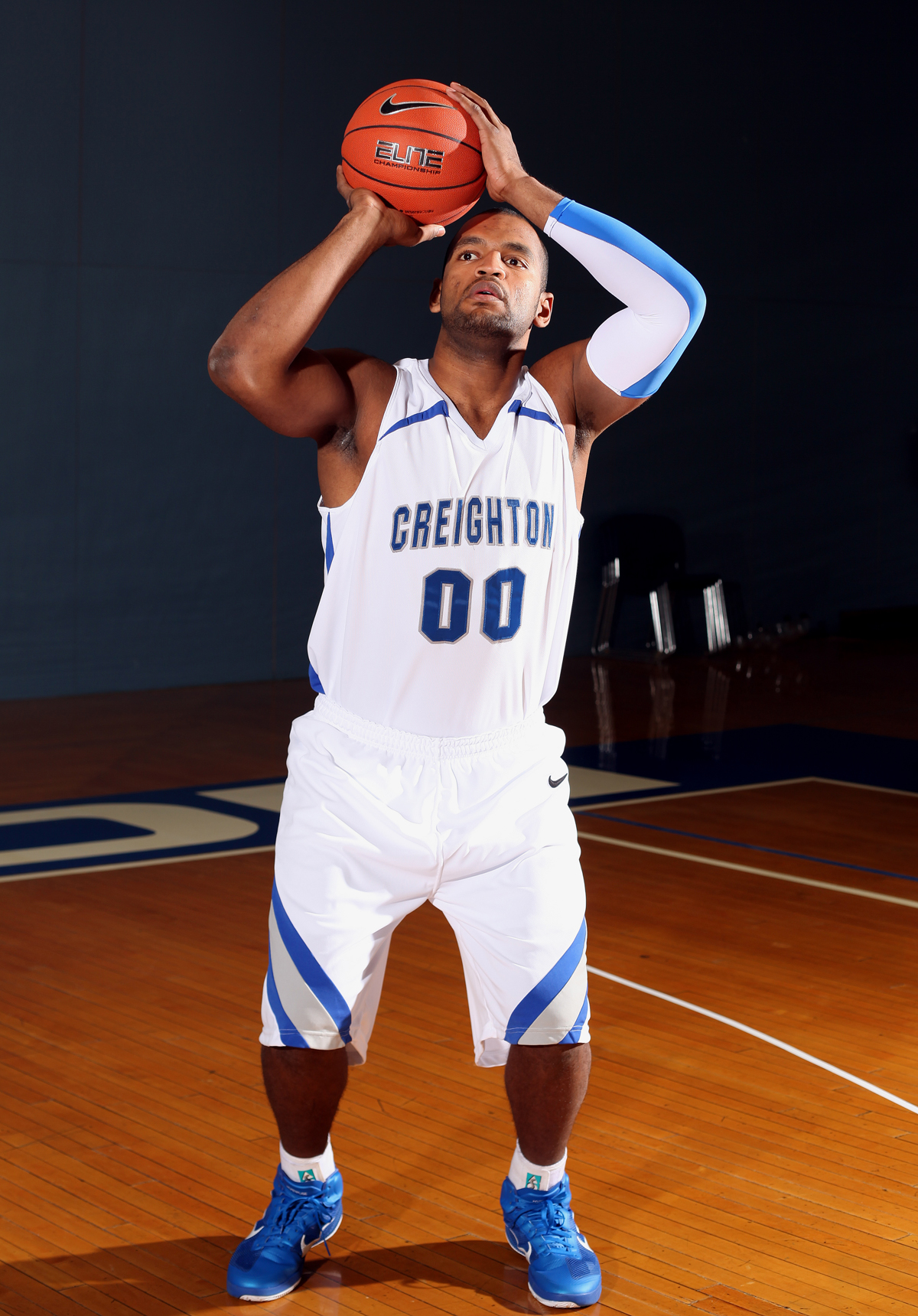
- Echenique in 2010

No. 88 – Kumamoto Volters
- Position: Power forward / center
- League: B.League

Personal information
- Born: November 20, 1990 (age 35) Miranda, Venezuela
- Listed height: 6 ft 10 in (2.08 m)
- Listed weight: 270 lb (122 kg)

Career information
- High school: Saint Benedict's (Newark, New Jersey)
- College: Rutgers (2008–2009); Creighton (2010–2013)
- NBA draft: 2013: undrafted
- Playing career: 2013–present

Career history
- 2013: Riesen Ludwigsburg
- 2014: Oostende
- 2014–2018: Guaros de Lara
- 2018–2019: Shimane Susanoo Magic
- 2019–2022: Hiroshima Dragonflies
- 2022–2024: Fukushima Firebonds
- 2024–present: Kumamoto Volters

Career highlights
- B2 League MVP (2020); B2 League Rebound Leader (2019); FIBA Intercontinental Cup champion (2016); 2× FIBA Americas League champion (2016, 2017); FIBA Americas League Ideal Quintet (2017); Belgian League champion (2014); Belgian Cup winner (2014)
- Stats at Basketball Reference
Medals
Men's basketball
Representing Venezuela
FIBA South American Championship
Gold medal – first place	2016 Venezuela
Silver medal – second place	2012 Argentina

Gregory Joshue Echenique Carrillo (born November 20, 1990) is a Venezuelan professional basketball player for the Kumamoto Volters of the Japanese B.League.

== College career ==
Echenique played college basketball at Rutgers University, with the Rutgers Scarlet Knights from 2008 to 2009, and at Creighton University, with the Creighton Bluejays, from 2010 to 2013.

== Professional career ==
After going undrafted in the 2013 NBA draft, Echenique signed with the German team MHP Riesen Ludwigsburg, which played in the Basketball Bundesliga. He was cut by the team in December 2013, after playing 10 games with the team.

In January 2014, he signed a two-month contract with Belgian club Telenet Oostende, the defending Belgian League champion. After this period his contract was extended until the end of the season. He re-signed with Oostende in August 2014 until December 27, 2014. A day later, he signed with the Venezuelan team Guaros de Lara.

He won the 2016 FIBA Americas League championship and the 2016 edition of the FIBA Intercontinental Cup championship with Guaros de Lara. On September 23, 2018, Echenique signed with Shimane Susanoo Magic of the Japanese B.League.

On October 18, 2024, Echenique signed a short-term contract with Fukushima Firebonds of the B.League. On November 10, his contract expired. On November 12, Echenique signed a 2024–25 season contract with Kumamoto Volters of the B.League.

== National team career ==
Echenique is a member of the senior men's Venezuelan national basketball team. He played with Venezuela at the following tournaments: the 2009 FIBA Americas Championship; the 2011 FIBA Americas Championship; the 2012 South American Championship, where he won a silver medal; the 2012 FIBA World Olympic Qualifying Tournament; the 2015 Pan American Games; and the 2016 South American Championship, where he won a gold medal.

He also played at the 2016 Summer Olympics.
