= 2015–16 Liga Nacional de Básquet season =

Liga Nacional de Básquet
- Season: 2015–16
- Dates: 22 September 2015 – 1 May 2016 (regular season); 6 May – 23 June 2016 (playoffs)
- Games played: 560 (Regular season); 34–57 (Playoffs)
- Teams: 20
- TV partner(s): TyC Sports

Regular season
- FIBA Americas League: San Lorenzo; La Unión
- Liga Sudamericana: Ciclista Olímpico; Gimnasia y Esgrima (CR); Weber Bahía Basket
- Season MVP: (United States) Justin Williams
- Promoted: Instituto de Córdoba; Ferro Carril Oeste
- Relegated: Juventud Sionista

Finals
- Champions: San Lorenzo
- Runners-up: La Unión
- Semifinalists: Weber Bahía Basket; Ciclista Olímpico
- Finals MVP: (Argentina) Walter Herrmann

Statistical leaders
| Points | (United States) Walter Baxley | 23.7 |
| Rebounds | (United States) Dwayne Jones | 13.2 |
| Assists | (Argentina) Franco Balbi | 6.2 |

The 2015–16 Liga Nacional de Básquet season was the 32nd season of the top professional basketball league in Argentina. The regular season started on 22 September 2015 and the defending champions were Club Atlético Quimsa. The finals were contested between San Lorenzo and La Unión, with San Lorenzo winning their first league title on 23 June 2016.

== Promotions and relegations ==
Torneo Nacional de Ascenso Champions from the previous season Instituto de Córdoba and runners-up 9 de Julio de Río Tercero were promoted. The latter, however, merged with newly reformed San Lorenzo, one of the founding teams of the original League, marking this their official return to the top tier. Another team that made its return was Ferro Carril Oeste, one of the powerhouses of the 80s and the inaugural Champion. The club purchased their league spot from Ciclista Juninense, whose financial situation made it impossible for them to keep competing at the top level, and returned to the Torneo Nacional de Ascenso. At the end of the season, Juventud Sionista was relegated after losing the playoff series against Lanús.

== Clubs ==
| Team | City | Arena | Capacity |
|---|---|---|---|
| Argentino de Junín | Junín | El Fortín de las Morochas | 1,465 |
| Atenas | Córdoba | Carlos Cerutti | 3,730 |
| Bahía Basket | Bahía Blanca | Osvaldo Casanova | 3,950 |
| Boca Juniors | Buenos Aires | Luis Conde | 2,000 |
| Ciclista Olímpico | La Banda | Luis Conde | 2,000 |
| Estudiantes Concordia | Concordia | Gigante Verde | 1,610 |
| Ferro Carril Oeste | Buenos Aires | Estadio Héctor Etchart | 4,500 |
| Gimnasia y Esgrima (Comodoro Rivadavia) | Comodoro Rivadavia | Socios Fundadores | 2,276 |
| Instituto (Córdoba) | Córdoba | Angel Sandrin | 2,000 |
| Juventud Sionista | Paraná | Estadio Moisés Flesler | 2,100 |
| Lanús | Lanús | Antonio Rotili | 4,000 |
| Libertad | Sunchales | El Hogar de los Tigres | 4,000 |
| Obras Sanitarias | Buenos Aires | Estadio Obras | 3,100 |
| Peñarol | Mar del Plata | Islas Malvinas | 8,000 |
| Quilmes | Mar del Plata | Once Unidos | 3,000 |
| Quimsa | Santiago del Estero | Estadio Ciudad | 5,200 |
| Regatas Corrientes | Corrientes | José Jorge Contte | 4,000 |
| San Lorenzo | Buenos Aires | Estadio Héctor Etchart | 4,500 |
| San Martín de Corrientes | Corrientes | Raúl A. Ortiz | 2,500 |
| La Unión | Formosa | Cincuentenario | 4,500 |

== Regular season ==
=== League table ===
==== North Conference ====
| Pos | Team | Pld | W | L | PCT | Qualification or relegation |
|---|---|---|---|---|---|---|
| 1 | Ciclista Olímpico | 56 | 36 | 20 | .643 | Conference semifinals |
| 2 | La Unión | 56 | 31 | 25 | .554 | Conference semifinals |
| 3 | Quimsa | 56 | 31 | 25 | .554 | Conference quarterfinals |
| 4 | Libertad | 56 | 31 | 25 | .554 | Conference quarterfinals |
| 5 | San Martín de Corrientes | 56 | 28 | 28 | .500 | Conference quarterfinals |
| 6 | Regatas Corrientes | 56 | 27 | 29 | .482 | Conference quarterfinals |
| 7 | Estudiantes Concordia | 56 | 27 | 29 | .482 | |
| 8 | Atenas | 56 | 26 | 30 | .464 | |
| 9 | Instituto (Córdoba) | 56 | 23 | 33 | .411 | |
| 10 | Juventud Sionista | 56 | 20 | 36 | .357 | Relegation playoffs |

==== South Conference ====
| Pos | Team | Pld | W | L | PCT | Qualification or relegation |
|---|---|---|---|---|---|---|
| 1 | Gimnasia y Esgrima (Comodoro Rivadavia) | 56 | 33 | 23 | .589 | Conference semifinals |
| 2 | Peñarol | 56 | 32 | 24 | .571 | Conference semifinals |
| 3 | Bahía Basket | 56 | 31 | 25 | .554 | Conference quarterfinals |
| 4 | San Lorenzo | 56 | 30 | 26 | .536 | Conference quarterfinals |
| 5 | Obras Sanitarias | 56 | 28 | 28 | .500 | Conference quarterfinals |
| 6 | Argentino de Junín | 56 | 26 | 30 | .464 | Conference quarterfinals |
| 7 | Ferro Carril Oeste | 56 | 26 | 30 | .464 | |
| 8 | Quilmes | 56 | 25 | 31 | .446 | |
| 9 | Boca Juniors | 56 | 25 | 31 | .446 | |
| 10 | Lanús | 56 | 24 | 32 | .429 | Relegation playoffs |

== Playoffs ==
=== Championship playoffs ===
Quarterfinals | Semifinals
N1 | Ciclista Olímpico | 3
N4 | Libertad | 1
N4 | Libertad | 3
N5 | San Martín (Corrientes) | 2
North Conference
N2 | La Unión | 3
N6 | Regatas Corrientes | 1
N3 | Quimsa | 0
N6 | Regatas Corrientes | 3
S2 | Peñarol | 1
S3 | Bahía Basket | 3
S3 | Bahía Basket | 3
S6 | Argentino de Junín | 2
South Conference
S1 | Gimnasia y Esgrima (Comodoro Rivadavia) | 1
S4 | San Lorenzo | 3
S4 | San Lorenzo | 3
S5 | Obras Sanitarias | 0

Conference Finals
N1 | Ciclista Olímpico | 2
N2 | La Unión | 3
S3 | Bahía Basket | 1
S4 | San Lorenzo | 3

Championship finals
N2 | La Unión | 0
S4 | San Lorenzo | 4

=== Relegation playoffs ===
| Finals |
| S10 | Lanús | 3 |
| N10 | Juventud Sionista | 1 |

== Clubs in international competitions ==
| Team | Competition | Progress |
|---|---|---|
| Quimsa | FIBA Americas League | Quarterfinals |
| Gimnasia Indalo | FIBA Americas League | Group stage |
| San Martín de Corrientes | Liga Sudamericana de Básquetbol | Runners-up |
| Obras Sanitarias | Liga Sudamericana de Básquetbol | Semifinals |
| Quilmes | Liga Sudamericana de Básquetbol | Semifinals |

== Awards ==
=== Yearly Awards ===
- Most Valuable Player: Justin Williams, Ciclista Olímpico
- Best Foreign Player: Justin Williams, Ciclista Olímpico
- Sixth Man of the Year: Mauro Cosolito, Ciclista Olímpico
- Rookie of the Year: Pablo Bertone, Lanús
- Coach of the Year: Fernando Duró, Ciclista Olímpico
- Most Improved Player: Lucio Redivo, Bahía Basket
- All-Tournament Team:
  - F Federico Aguerre, Gimnasia Indalo
  - F Walter Herrmann, San Lorenzo
  - C Justin Williams, Ciclista Olímpico
  - G Maximiliano Stanic, Ciclista Olímpico
  - G Walter Baxley, Quilmes
