= Bruno Šundov =

Croatian basketball player (born 1980)

Personal information
- Born: February 10, 1980 (age 46) Split, SR Croatia, SFR Yugoslavia
- Listed height: 7 ft 2 in (2.18 m)
- Listed weight: 260 lb (118 kg)

Career information
- High school: The Winchendon School (Winchendon, Massachusetts)
- NBA draft: 1998: 2nd round, 35th overall pick
- Drafted by: Dallas Mavericks
- Playing career: 1997–2018
- Position: Center
- Number: 40, 41, 14

Career history
- 1997–1998: Split
- 1998–2000: Dallas Mavericks
- 2000: Leones de Ponce
- 2000–2002: Indiana Pacers
- 2002–2003: Boston Celtics
- 2003: Cleveland Cavaliers
- 2004: New York Knicks
- 2004: Gary Steelheads
- 2004: Maccabi Tel Aviv
- 2004: Verviers-Pepinster
- 2004–2005: New York Knicks
- 2005–2007: Lucentum Alicante
- 2007–2008: AEL Limassol
- 2008: Baloncesto León
- 2008: ASK Riga
- 2009: Cibona
- 2009: Menorca Bàsquet
- 2009–2010: BC Donetsk
- 2010: Kavala
- 2010: Valencia
- 2011–2012: Lukoil Academic
- 2012: Osječki sokol
- 2013: Rain or Shine Elasto Painters
- 2013–2014: Al Shabab
- 2014: Jászberényi KSE
- 2014–2015: Lukoil Academic
- 2015–2016: Al-Ahli
- 2016: Toros del Norte
- 2016: Petrochimi
- 2016: Al-Ahli
- 2016–2017: Al Shaab
- 2017: Al Sharjah
- 2018: Split

Career highlights
- EuroLeague champion (2004); Bulgarian League champion (2015); Bulgarian Cup winner (2012)
- Stats at NBA.com
- Stats at Basketball Reference
Medals
Men's basketball
Representing Croatia
FIBA U-21 World Cup
| Silver medal – second place | 2001 Japan | U-21 Team |

Bruno Šundov (born February 10, 1980) is a Croatian former professional basketball player. Standing at 2.18 m (7 ft 2 in), he played the center position. He played for five NBA teams and over 20 clubs around the world.

== Professional career ==
Šundov was a second-round draft pick of the Dallas Mavericks in the 1998 NBA draft, aged only 18; after he was drafted the Mavericks placed him at The Winchendon School in Winchendon, Massachusetts for the majority of the season until he was activated by the Mavericks in February 1999 at which time he became the only player in NBA history to play in a regular season high school & NBA basketball game in the same week. He played sparingly for a number of teams during a seven-year spell: the Mavericks (1998–2000), Indiana Pacers (2000–02), Boston Celtics (2002–03), Cleveland Cavaliers (2003–04) and the New York Knicks (January 2004 and 2004–05). He averaged 1.7 points and one rebound per game over his NBA career.

Šundov also played with the Israeli league club Maccabi Tel Aviv in February 2004, and with RBC Verviers-Pepinster in the Basketball League Belgium in May later that year.

In September 2005, after leaving the NBA, he signed with the Spanish club Etosa Alicante, and two seasons later he joined five times-in-a-row Cyprus national championship club Proteas EKA AEL, being crucial in the team's success in the Eurocup campaign, where the club finished in third place.

In February 2008, Šundov was signed by the Spanish ACB league club Grupo Begar León, which was eventually relegated after the 2007–08 ACB season. In September 2008, he joined ASK Riga in the Baltic League and, later that season moved to Adriatic League team Cibona Zagreb. He ended that season with Menorca Bàsquet in Spain, then joined Donetsk. When the latter team went bankrupt in January 2010, Sundov signed with Kavala of the Greek League.

In September 2010 he signed a one-month contract with Valencia BC in Spain which was not extended. In January 2011, Sundov signed with the Bulgarian team PBC Lukoil Academic.

The Rain or Shine Elasto Painters selected Sundov as an import for the 2013 Philippine Basketball Association's Commissioner's Cup; he is the first European (and European-born) player to play as an import in the PBA. Later in 2013, Sundov signed with Al Shabab in the United Arab Emirates. In February 2014, he signed with Jászberényi KSE of Hungary.

In November 2014, he signed with his former club Lukoil Academic for the 2014–15 season. In late November 2015, he signed with Al-Ahli of the Bahraini Premier League. After moving to the Nicaraguan Toros del Norte with whom he played in the 2016 FIBA Americas League, in January 2016 Šundov landed in Petrochimi of the Iranian League.

On January 5, 2018, Šundov signed with KK Split and returned to the Croatian Premier League.

== National team career ==
Šundov won silver with the Croatia national basketball team at the 2001 FIBA Under-21 World Championship, averaging 10.7 points and 4.6 rebounds per game during the tournament.

== Career statistics ==
Legend
| GP | Games played | GS | Games started | MPG | Minutes per game |
| FG% | Field-goal percentage | 3P% | 3-point field-goal percentage | FT% | Free-throw percentage |
| RPG | Rebounds per game | APG | Assists per game | SPG | Steals per game |
| BPG | Blocks per game | PPG | Points per game | PIR | Performance index rating |
| **Bold** | Career high |

=== NBA ===
==== Regular season ====
| Year | Team | GP | GS | MPG | FG% | 3P% | FT% | RPG | APG | SPG | BPG | PPG |
|---|---|---|---|---|---|---|---|---|---|---|---|---|
| 1998–99 | Dallas | 3 | 0 | 3.7 | .286 | - | - | .0 | .3 | .0 | .0 | 1.3 |
| 1999–2000 | Dallas | 14 | 0 | 4.4 | .387 | - | **1.000** | .9 | .1 | .1 | .1 | 1.9 |
| 2000–01 | Indiana | 11 | **4** | **10.9** | .488 | .000 | .600 | 2.1 | .2 | **.2** | **.4** | **3.9** |
| 2001–02 | Indiana | 22 | 0 | 4.0 | .400 | - | .000 | 1.0 | .1 | .1 | .1 | 1.5 |
| 2002–03 | Boston | **26** | 0 | 5.3 | .250 | .250 | .000 | 1.1 | .3 | **.2** | .1 | 1.2 |
| 2003–04 | Cleveland | 4 | 0 | 7.3 | .333 | - | .500 | **2.5** | .0 | .0 | .0 | 2.3 |
| 2003–04 | New York | 1 | 0 | 4.0 | **1.000** | - | - | .0 | **1.0** | .0 | .0 | 2.0 |
| 2004–05 | New York | 21 | 0 | 3.5 | .297 | **.333** | **1.000** | .6 | .1 | .1 | .1 | 1.2 |
| Career | | 102 | 4 | 5.1 | .356 | .208 | .526 | 1.0 | .2 | .1 | .1 | 1.7 |

==== Playoffs ====
| Year | Team | GP | GS | MPG | FG% | 3P% | FT% | RPG | APG | SPG | BPG | PPG |
|---|---|---|---|---|---|---|---|---|---|---|---|---|
| 2002 | Indiana | 1 | 0 | 2.0 | 1.000 | .000 | .000 | .0 | .0 | .0 | .0 | 2.0 |
| Career | | 1 | 0 | 2.0 | 1.000 | .000 | .000 | .0 | .0 | .0 | .0 | 2.0 |

=== EuroLeague ===
| Year | Team | GP | GS | MPG | FG% | 3P% | FT% | RPG | APG | SPG | BPG | PPG | PIR |
|---|---|---|---|---|---|---|---|---|---|---|---|---|---|
| 2003–04 | Maccabi | **4** | 0 | 4.5 | **.800** | .000 | **1.000** | 1.0 | .0 | .0 | .0 | 2.5 | **2.0** |
| 2008–09 | Cibona | **4** | **1** | **9.3** | .357 | **.400** | **1.000** | **2.0** | .0 | .0 | .0 | **3.5** | 1.9 |
| Career | | 8 | 1 | 7.1 | .473 | .400 | 1.000 | 1.5 | .0 | .0 | .0 | 3.0 | 1.9 |
