= Lucio Redivo =

Argentine basketball player

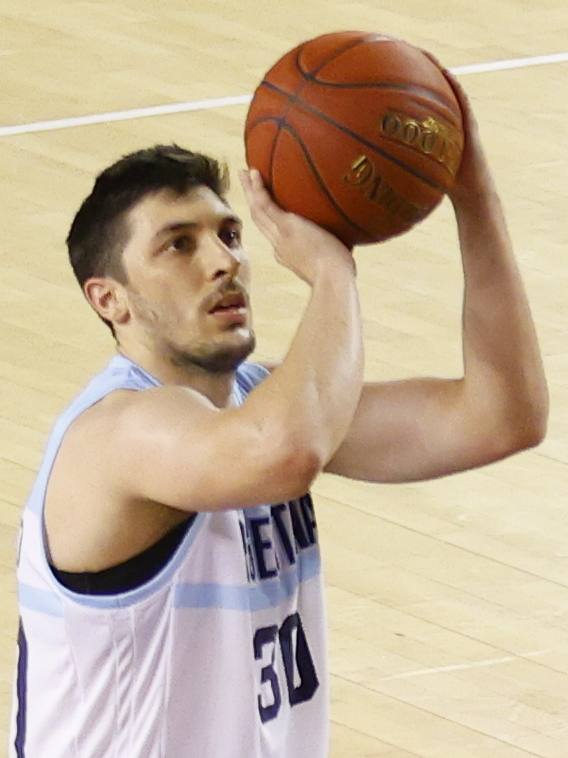

No. 3 – Gesteco Cividale
- Position: Point guard / shooting guard
- League: Serie A2

Personal information
- Born: February 12, 1994 (age 32) Bahía Blanca, Buenos Aires, Argentina
- Listed height: 1.83 m (6 ft 0 in)
- Listed weight: 84 kg (185 lb)

Career information
- NBA draft: 2016: undrafted
- Playing career: 2012–present

Career history
- 2012–2017: Bahía Basket
- 2017–2018: Bilbao Basket
- 2018–2019: Breogán
- 2019–2020: Aguacateros de Michoacán
- 2020–2021: Casale Monferrato
- 2021–2022: New Basket Brindisi
- 2022–2023: Casale Monferrato
- 2023–present: Gesteco Cividale

Career highlights
- FIBA Americas League Top Scorer (2017); FIBA Americas League Ideal Quintet (2017); Argentine League Most Improved Player (2016)
Medals
Men's basketball
Representing Argentina
World Cup
Silver medal – second place	2019 China
FIBA AmeriCup
Silver medal – second place	2017 Argentina
Pan American Games
Gold medal – first place	2019 Lima

Lucio Redivo (born February 14, 1994) is an Argentine-Italian professional basketball player for Gesteco Cividale of the Italian Serie A2. He can play at both the point guard and shooting guard positions, with shooting guard being his main position.

== Professional career ==
Redivo started his professional career with the Argentine club Bahía Basket in 2012. On August 26, 2017, he joined the Spanish club Bilbao Basket. In 2017–18 season, he averaged 10.2 points over 33 games in the Spanish League. He also appeared in 9 games of EuroCup and averaged 9.6 points, 1.4 assists and 1.1 rebounds per game.

On August 1, 2018, he signed a contract with the Spanish club CB Breogán. Over 32 Spanish League games, he averaged 10.8 points, 2.2 assists and 1.9 rebounds per game.

He played Los Aguacateros of the Mexican Basketball League in the season 2019–20 and the next year (season 2020–21), he played in the Italian Serie A2 for Casale Monferrato.

At the beginning of the 2021–22 season, Redivo was called by Brindisi in the Serie A to replace the injured Wes Clark with a short-term contract, with the possibility to extend it to the end of the season.

== National team career ==
Redivo has been a member of the senior Argentine national basketball team. He played with Argentina at the 2017 FIBA AmeriCup. In 2019, he took part in the team that won the Pan American gold medal in Lima. He was included in the Argentine squad for the 2019 FIBA Basketball World Cup and clinched silver medal with Argentina which emerged as runners-up to Spain at the 2019 FIBA Basketball World Cup.
