= Damien Wilkins =

American basketball player (born 1980)

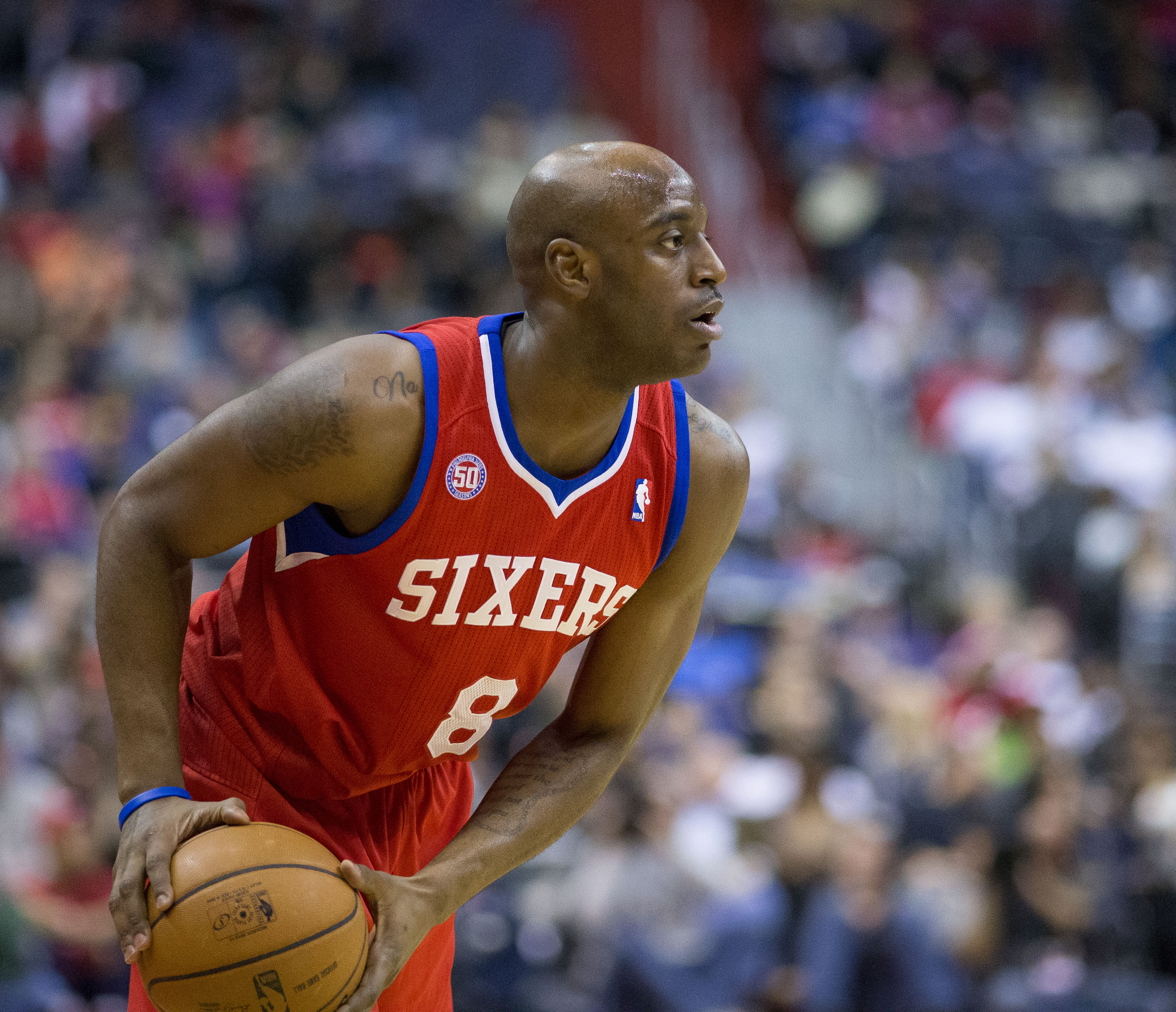
- Wilkins with the Philadelphia 76ers in 2013

Personal information
- Born: January 11, 1980 (age 46) Washington, North Carolina, U.S.
- Listed height: 6 ft 6 in (1.98 m)
- Listed weight: 217 lb (98 kg)

Career information
- High school: Dr. Phillips (Orlando, Florida)
- College: NC State (1999–2001); Georgia (2002–2004)
- NBA draft: 2004: undrafted
- Playing career: 2004–2018
- Position: Small forward / shooting guard
- Number: 12, 21, 3, 9, 8

Career history
- 2004–2009: Seattle SuperSonics / Oklahoma City Thunder
- 2009–2010: Minnesota Timberwolves
- 2011: Atlanta Hawks
- 2011–2012: Detroit Pistons
- 2012–2013: Philadelphia 76ers
- 2013–2014: Beijing Ducks
- 2014: Indios de Mayagüez
- 2014–2015: Iowa Energy
- 2015: Indios de Mayagüez
- 2015–2016: Guaros de Lara
- 2016–2017: Greensboro Swarm
- 2017: Brujos de Guayama
- 2017–2018: Indiana Pacers
- 2018: Greensboro Swarm

Career highlights
- FIBA Americas League Grand Final MVP (2016); All-NBA D-League Third Team (2015); NBA D-League All-Star (2015); BSN Scoring Champion (2017); McDonald's All-American (1999); Second-team Parade All-American (1999)
- Stats at NBA.com
- Stats at Basketball Reference
Medals
Representing the United States
Pan American Games
| Bronze medal – third place | 2015 Toronto | National team |

Damien Lamont Wilkins (born January 11, 1980) is an American former professional basketball player and basketball executive who played in the National Basketball Association for ten seasons. He is the son of retired 13-year NBA veteran Gerald Wilkins and nephew of nine-time NBA All-Star, Hall of famer Dominique Wilkins.

== College career ==
After graduating from Dr. Phillips High School in Orlando, Florida, Wilkins enrolled at North Carolina State University. Two years into a quick and promising start to his NCAA career at North Carolina State, Wilkins entered the 2001 NBA draft but decided to withdraw and transfer to University of Georgia. There, he had two solid but unspectacular seasons and went undrafted in 2004.

== Professional career ==
Diligence in the weight room helped Wilkins have a big summer league and shine in preseason action for the Sonics, allowing him to make the team. Working after practice, Wilkins got his shot towards the end of his rookie season and scored 21 points at Portland on March 24, 2005. Wilkins would start seven games the rest of the way as the Sonics battled injuries. He proved himself in the 2005 Playoffs when injuries struck again, finishing with 15 points, six rebounds and five steals in the Sonics' Game 4 win over San Antonio. A restricted free agent in the summer of 2005, Wilkins received an offer from the Minnesota Timberwolves in August 2005, which the Sonics matched within 7 days.

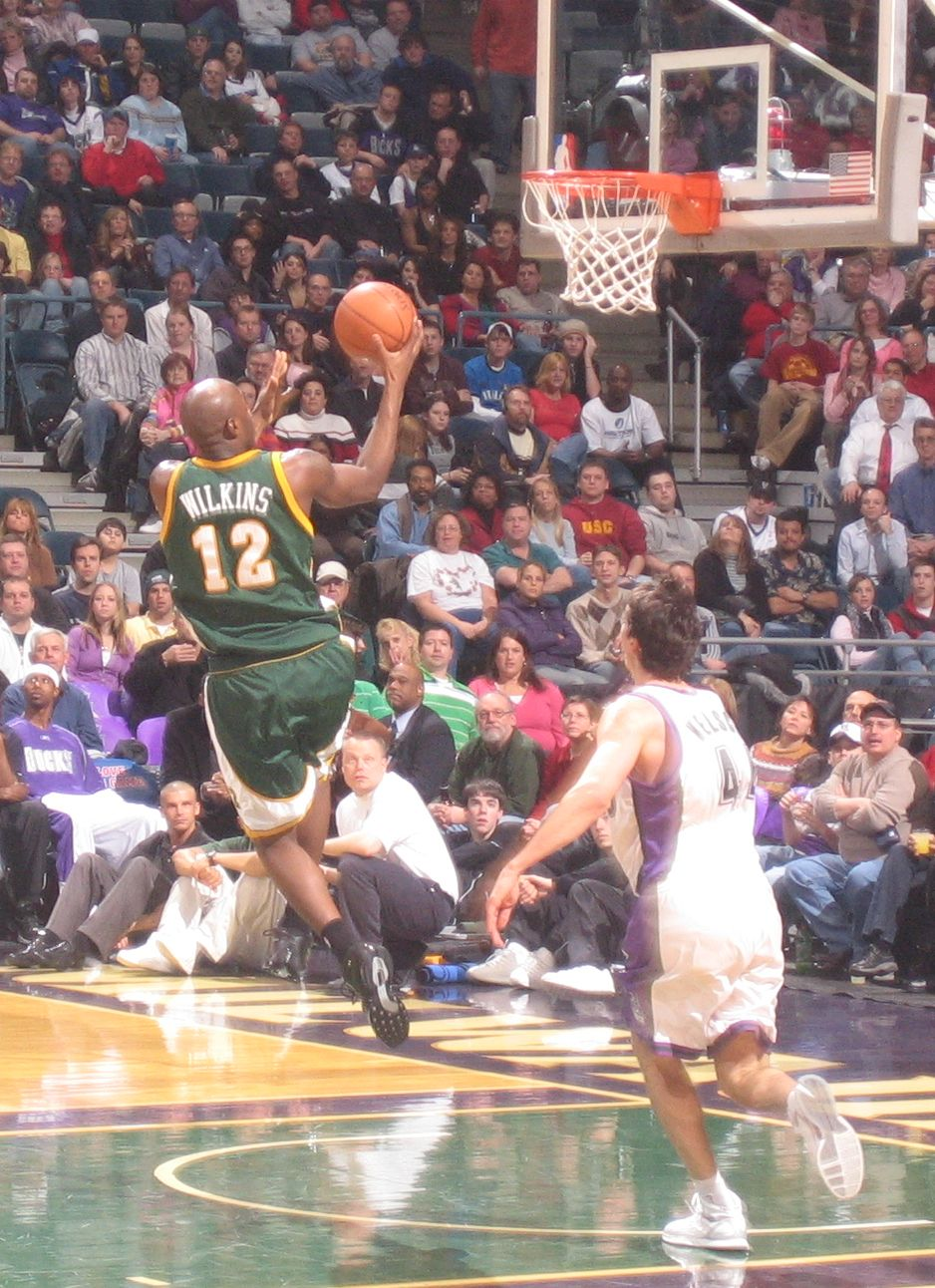
Wilkins playing for the Sonics.

In the 2007 season, the departure of Rashard Lewis and Ray Allen made Wilkins a starter. On November 16, 2007, he scored a career-high 41 points and grabbed 9 rebounds in a game against the Atlanta Hawks.

On July 27, 2009, Wilkins was traded to the Minnesota Timberwolves along with Chucky Atkins for center Etan Thomas and two future second-round draft picks.

On September 28, 2010, he was signed by the Memphis Grizzlies, but he was waived at the end of training camp on October 21.

On December 3, 2010, he signed a contract with the Atlanta Hawks after Joe Johnson's injury. The Hawks released him after one month.

On January 8, 2011, the Atlanta Hawks signed Wilkins to a 10-day contract. On January 28, 2011, the Hawks signed him for the remainder of the season.

During the 2011–12 season, Wilkins played for the Detroit Pistons. In September 2012, he signed with the Philadelphia 76ers.

On September 30, 2013, he rejoined the Atlanta Hawks. On October 14, 2013, he was waived by the Hawks.

In December 2013, he signed with the Beijing Ducks of China. In his first game for the Ducks, he recorded 10 points, 2 rebounds, and 1 assist in a 106–99 victory over Liaoning.

On May 1, 2014, he signed with Indios de Mayagüez for the rest of the 2014 BSN season.

On November 1, 2014, he was selected by the Iowa Energy with the 16th overall pick in the 2014 NBA Development League draft. On February 4, 2015, he was named to the Futures All-Star team for the 2015 NBA D-League All-Star Game. On April 20, he returned to Indios de Mayagüez.

After initially signing with a Venezuelan team for the 2015–16 season, Wilkins was swayed into re-entering the NBA following the injury to Michael Kidd-Gilchrist of the Charlotte Hornets. He and his agent contacted the Hornets and the two parties came to an agreement on a non-guaranteed training camp contract on October 5, 2015. On October 16, he officially signed with the Hornets. However, he was waived by the Hornets a week later after appearing in three preseason games. Two days later, he signed with Guaros de Lara of the Venezuelan League.

On October 31, 2016, Wilkins was acquired by the Greensboro Swarm of the NBA Development League.

In April 2017, Wilkins joined Brujos de Guayama of the Baloncesto Superior Nacional.

On August 15, 2017, Wilkins signed with the Indiana Pacers, returning to the NBA for the first time since 2013. On January 7, 2018, Wilkins was waived by the Pacers. On February 1, 2018, Wilkins returned to Greensboro Swarm.

== National team career ==
Wilkins represented the United States national team at the 2015 Pan American Games, where he won a bronze medal.

== NBA career statistics ==
Legend
| GP | Games played | GS | Games started | MPG | Minutes per game |
| FG% | Field goal percentage | 3P% | 3-point field goal percentage | FT% | Free throw percentage |
| RPG | Rebounds per game | APG | Assists per game | SPG | Steals per game |
| BPG | Blocks per game | PPG | Points per game | **Bold** | Career high |

=== Regular season ===
| Year | Team | GP | GS | MPG | FG% | 3P% | FT% | RPG | APG | SPG | BPG | PPG |
|---|---|---|---|---|---|---|---|---|---|---|---|---|
| 2004–05 | Seattle | 29 | 7 | 17.9 | .435 | .271 | .618 | 2.3 | .9 | .8 | **.3** | 6.3 |
| 2005–06 | Seattle | **82*** | 12 | 18.6 | .444 | .250 | .840 | 2.3 | 1.3 | .9 | .1 | 6.5 |
| 2006–07 | Seattle | **82*** | **31** | **24.8** | .435 | **.410** | **.882** | 2.8 | 1.9 | **1.1** | .2 | 8.8 |
| 2007–08 | Seattle | 76 | **31** | 24.3 | .403 | .323 | .736 | **3.2** | **2.0** | .8 | **.3** | **9.2** |
| 2008–09 | Oklahoma City | 41 | 14 | 15.5 | .362 | .375 | .804 | 1.7 | .9 | .5 | .2 | 5.3 |
| 2009–10 | Minnesota | 80 | **31** | 19.8 | .433 | .295 | .798 | 3.1 | 1.7 | .8 | **.3** | 5.6 |
| 2010–11 | Atlanta | 52 | 0 | 13.0 | **.504** | .200 | .714 | 1.7 | .8 | .5 | .2 | 3.5 |
| 2011–12 | Detroit | 60 | 2 | 15.4 | .394 | .304 | .630 | 1.7 | .7 | .5 | .2 | 3.2 |
| 2012–13 | Philadelphia | 61 | 21 | 18.0 | .459 | .333 | .743 | 1.7 | 1.5 | .6 | **.3** | 6.4 |
| 2017–18 | Indiana | 19 | 1 | 8.0 | .333 | .222 | .750 | .8 | .5 | .1 | .1 | 1.7 |
| Career | | 582 | 150 | 18.9 | .426 | .327 | .783 | 2.3 | 1.4 | .7 | .2 | 6.2 |

=== Playoffs ===
| Year | Team | GP | GS | MPG | FG% | 3P% | FT% | RPG | APG | SPG | BPG | PPG |
|---|---|---|---|---|---|---|---|---|---|---|---|---|
| 2005 | Seattle | 7 | 0 | **19.4** | .444 | **.273** | **.444** | **2.6** | **.4** | **1.4** | .1 | **5.6** |
| 2011 | Atlanta | **8** | 0 | 4.9 | **.538** | .000 | .000 | 1.0 | .1 | .3 | **.3** | 1.8 |
| Career | | 15 | 0 | 11.7 | .469 | .231 | .444 | 1.7 | .3 | .8 | .2 | 3.5 |

== Personal life ==
Wilkins is the son of retired 13-year NBA veteran Gerald Wilkins and nephew of nine-time NBA All-Star Dominique Wilkins. Isaiah Wilkins, the stepson of Dominique, also played basketball professionally.

Wilkins has been the General Manager and Head of Basketball of Overtime Elite since September 2022.
