= Guaros de Lara =

- Leagues: LPB; Champions League Americas
- Founded: 1983; 43 years ago (original club) 2003; 23 years ago (current club)
- History: Bravos de Portuguesa (1983–1993); Malteros de Lara (1993–1995); Bravos de Lara (1995–1998); Bravos de Portuguesa (1998–2003); Guaros de Lara (2003–present)
- Arena: Domo Bolivariano
- Capacity: 10,000
- Location: Barquisimeto, Lara, Venezuela
- Team colors: Red, Black
- President: Jorge Hernández Fernández
- Vice-president: Andrea Hernández M./ Jorge Hernández M.
- Team captain: Heissler Guillent
- Ownership: Jorge Hernández Fernández
- Championships: 1 FIBA Intercontinental Cup; 2 FIBA Americas League; 1 FIBA South American League; 2 Venezuelan League
- Website: guarosbbc.com
Home	Away	Third

The Guaros de Lara is a Venezuelan professional basketball club, that is based in Barquisimeto, Lara, Venezuela. Guaros de Lara BBC has existed as a club in various different forms since 1983. It has existed in its current form since 2003.

The club competes in the Venezuelan LPB. The club has won two Venezuelan LPB national domestic titles. On the international stage, the club also has one continental FIBA South American League title, and three intercontinental titles, consisting of two FIBA Americas League titles and one FIBA Intercontinental Cup title.

== History ==
In 1982, Flavio Fridegotto decided to sell his ownership in the Colosos de Carabobo basketball team, which led the club move from Carabobo, to the city of Acarigua. In Acarigua, the club began to compete under the name of Bravos de Portuguesa, in 1983. In 1993, the club moved to Barquisimeto, and changed its name to Malteros de Lara. In 1995, the club changed its name to Bravos de Lara.

The club again relocated, as it moved to the city of Guanare. After moving to Guanare, the club re-named itself to Bravos de Portuguesa once again, in 1998. Former NBA player Carl Herrera played with the team in 1999. In 2003, Carlos García Ibáñez bought the Bravos de Portuguesa club, and he subsequently moved it back to the city of Barquisimeto. After the club returned to Barquisimeto, it was re-named to Guaros de Lara.

In 2016, the Guaros de Lara won the 2016 FIBA Americas League championship, and was crowned as the champion of all of Latin America, for the first time. Following their FIBA Americas League championship, Guaros also won the 2016 FIBA Intercontinental Cup, and thus they were crowned world basketball club champions, after beating the Skyliners Frankfurt in the final.

In 2017, the Guaros successfully defended their Americas intercontinental title, by defeating Weber Bahía Blanca, by a score of 88–65, in the final of the years' Americas League. Later, they also won their first Venezuelan League national domestic title, by defeating Marinos de Anzoátegui, 4–2, in the Venezuelan League's finals. Afterwards, they won the 2017 FIBA South American League championship, which was the club's first South American continental championship; after defeating Estudiantes Concordia, 3–1, in the league's finals. The Guaros de Lara drew an average home attendance of 2,285 in the 2017 Liga Profesional de Baloncesto season, the highest average in the league that year.

== Arena ==
The Guaros de Lara play their home games at the 10,000-capacity Domo Bolivariano in Barquisimeto, numerous times in front of thousands of spectators.

== Honours ==
=== Domestic ===
- Venezuelan League

Champions (2): 2017, 2018
Runners-up (5): 2005, 2006, 2015, 2019, 2022

=== South America ===
- FIBA South American League

Champions (1): 2017

=== Latin America ===
- FIBA Americas League

Champions (2): 2016, 2017
Runners-up (1): 2019

=== Worldwide ===
- FIBA Intercontinental Cup

Champions (1): 2016
Runners-up (1): 2017

== Current roster ==
Note: Flags indicate national team eligibility at FIBA-sanctioned events. Players may hold other non-FIBA nationalities not displayed.

Guaros de Lara roster
Players
Coaches

Pos.	No.	Nat.	Name	Ht.	Age
SF	1	(Venezuela)	Gonzalez, Ruben	1.90 m (6 ft 3 in)	24 – 13 January 2002
PG	3	(Venezuela)	Moreno, Luis	1.78 m (5 ft 10 in)	24 – 2 May 2001
G	9	(Venezuela)	Guillent, Heldrin	1.80 m (5 ft 11 in)	27 – 3 September 1998
G/F	10	(Venezuela)	Vargas, José Gregorio	1.95 m (6 ft 5 in)	44 – 23 February 1982
SG	11	(Venezuela)	Marquez, Omar	1.93 m (6 ft 4 in)	25 – 10 November 2000
PF	12	(Colombia)	Palacios, Juan	2.06 m (6 ft 9 in)	40 – 11 May 1985
F/C	14	(Venezuela)	Ruiz, Miguel	2.03 m (6 ft 8 in)	35 – 20 December 1990
PG	19	(Venezuela)	Guillent, Heissler	1.85 m (6 ft 1 in)	39 – 17 December 1986
C	23	(Rwanda)	Ibeh, Prince	2.08 m (6 ft 10 in)	31 – 3 June 1994
G	30	(Venezuela)	Cabrera, Alan	1.83 m (6 ft 0 in)	24 – 9 May 2001
F	32	(Venezuela)	Rodriguez, Erick	2.01 m (6 ft 7 in)	27 – 19 January 1999

Head coach

- Vacant

Legend

- (C) Team captain
- Injured

| ]}}

| accessdate = September 19, 2019 }}

=== Depth chart ===
Pos.	Starting 5	Bench
C	Prince Ibeh	Miguel Ruiz
PF	Juan Palacios	Erick Rodríguez
SF	José Gregorio Vargas	Ruben Gonzalez
SG	Alan Cabrera	Omar Marquez
PG	Heissler Guillent	Heldrin Guillent

=== Notable players ===
Note: Flags indicate national team eligibility at FIBA-sanctioned events. Players may hold other non-FIBA nationalities not displayed.

Criteria

To appear in this section a player must have either:

- Set a club record or won an individual award while at the club
- Played at least one official international match for their national team at any time
- Played at least one official NBA match at any time.

- (Venezuela) Luis Bethelmy
- (Venezuela) Néstor Colmenares
- (Venezuela) Gregory Echenique
- (Venezuela) Windi Graterol
- (Venezuela) Heissler Guillént
- (Venezuela) Miguel Marriaga
- (Venezuela) José Gregorio Vargas
- (Venezuela) Gregory Vargas
- (Venezuela) David Cubillán
- (United States) David Cooke
- (United States) Zach Graham
- (United States) Lazar Hayward
- (United States) Damion James
- (United States) Davon Jefferson
- (United States) Mario Little
- (United States) Nate Robinson
- (United States) Robert Upshaw
- (United States) Damien Wilkins
- (Serbia) Branko Cvetković

=== Head coaches ===
- (Argentina) Che García
- (Spain) Iván Déniz
- (Argentina) Fernando Duró
