= San Salvador BC =

- Leagues: FIBA Americas League
- Founded: 2018; 7 years ago
- Arena: Adolfo Pineda Gymnasium
- Location: San Salvador, El Salvador

San Salvador BC is a basketball club based in San Salvador, El Salvador.

The club was founded in February 2018, in order for the country of El Salvador to be represented in the 2018 FIBA Americas League. El Salvador had a 0–3 record in the group phase, as it was eliminated.
