= Windi Graterol =

Venezuelan basketball player

No. 15 – Guaiqueríes de Margarita
- Position: Power forward / center
- League: Venezuelan SuperLiga

Personal information
- Born: 10 September 1986 (age 40) Caracas, Venezuela
- Listed height: 6 ft 9 in (2.06 m)
- Listed weight: 243 lb (110 kg)

Career information
- Playing career: 2005–present

Career history
- 2005: Delfines de Miranda
- 2006: Cocodrilos de Caracas
- 2006: Delfines de Miranda
- 2007: Cocodrilos de Caracas
- 2007: Delfines de Miranda
- 2008: Caciques de Trujillo
- 2009: Cocodrilos de Caracas
- 2009: Tiburones de Vargas
- 2009–2010: Espartanos de Margarita
- 2010: Cocodrilos de Caracas
- 2010: Tiburones de Vargas
- 2010: Graneros de Portuguesa
- 2011: Cocodrilos de Caracas
- 2011: Tiburones de Vargas
- 2011: Canoneros Norte de Cucuta
- 2012: Cocodrilos de Caracas
- 2012: Tiburones de Vargas
- 2013: Capitanes de Arecibo
- 2013: Cocodrilos de Caracas
- 2013: Caquetios de Falcon
- 2014: Guaros de Lara
- 2014: Metros de Santiago
- 2014: Columbus 99
- 2015–2017: Guaros de Lara
- 2017–2018: Bucaneros de La Guaira
- 2018–2019: Brasília
- 2019: Boca Juniors
- 2019: Metros de Santiago
- 2020–2021: Spartans Distrito Capital
- 2022: Olímpico
- 2022: Spartans DC
- 2022–2023: Goes
- 2023–present: Guaiqueríes de Margarita

Career highlights
- Venezuelan SuperLiga champion (2020); FIBA Intercontinental Cup champion (2016); FIBA Americas League champion (2016)
Medals
Men's basketball
Representing Venezuela
FIBA South American Championship
Silver medal – second place	2012 Argentina
Gold medal – first place	2014 Venezuela
FIBA AmeriCup
Gold medal – first place	2015 Mexico

Windi Manuel Graterol Clemente (born September 10, 1986) is a Venezuelan professional basketball player for the Guaiqueríes de Margarita of the Venezuelan SuperLiga.

== Professional career ==
Graterol won both the 2016 edition of the FIBA Americas League, and the 2016 edition of the FIBA Intercontinental Cup.

== National team career ==
While playing with the senior men's Venezuelan national basketball team, Graterol won the silver medal at the 2012 South American Championship, the gold medal at the 2014 South American Championship, and the gold medal at the 2015 FIBA Americas Championship.

He also represented Venezuela at the men's basketball competition at the 2016 Summer Olympics.
