= Zach Graham =

American basketball player (born 1989)

Personal information
- Born: March 28, 1989 (age 37) Suwanee, Georgia, U.S.
- Listed height: 6 ft 6 in (1.98 m)
- Listed weight: 215 lb (98 kg)

Career information
- High school: Peachtree Ridge (Suwanee, Georgia)
- College: Ole Miss (2007–2011)
- NBA draft: 2011: undrafted
- Playing career: 2011–2023
- Position: Shooting guard / small forward

Career history
- 2011–2012: Reno Bighorns
- 2012: Air21 Express
- 2012–2013: Maliye Milli Piyango
- 2013: Air21 Express
- 2013–2014: Soles de Mexicali
- 2014: Indios de Mayagüez
- 2014: Caciques de Humacao
- 2014–2015: Soles de Mexicali
- 2015: Brujos de Guayama
- 2015: Estudiantes
- 2016–2017: Guaros de Lara
- 2017–2018: Maccabi Haifa
- 2018: Caciques de Humacao
- 2018–2019: Brasília
- 2019–2020: Club Atlético Aguada
- 2020: Mineros de Zacatecas
- 2020–2021: Flamengo
- 2021–2022: Bauru
- 2022–2023: Corinthians
- 2023: Mineros de Zacatecas

Career highlights
- FIBA Intercontinental Cup champion (2016); FIBA Intercontinental Cup MVP (2016); FIBA Americas League champion (2017); FIBA Americas League Grand Final MVP (2017); FIBA Americas League Ideal Quintet (2017)

Zachary Darnell Graham (born March 28, 1989) is an American former professional basketball player who last played for Mineros de Zacatecas of the Mexican League. He played college basketball at Mississippi for four years. He was undrafted in the 2011 NBA draft.

== Early life and college career ==
Zach Graham was born on March 28, 1989, in Suwanee, Georgia, and graduated from Peachtree Ridge High School in 2007. Graham played for Ole Miss Rebels from 2007 to 2011, where he averaged 9.4 points and 3.4 rebounds in 23.4 minutes while playing 135 games for them.

== Professional career ==
Graham was automatically eligible for the 2011 NBA draft but he was not drafted.

Graham then played for the Reno Bighorns of the D-League where he played 43 games for them, 23 of them on which he started, averaging 10.9 points and 3.2 rebounds in 23.8 minutes.

On December 9, 2011, Graham was signed by the Atlanta Hawks but was released on December 17 of the same year.

The Air21 Express selected him as their import for the 2012 Governors' Cup where he played and started all 9 games and averaged 37.6 points and 12.6 rebounds in 44.8 minutes of action.

After his stint with Air21, Grahan them played for Maliye Milli Piyango in Turkey.

Graham once again returned to Air21, this time in the 2013 Governors' Cup, playing in 8 games and averaging 27 points and 9.8 rebounds in 44 minutes of action.

Graham was signed by Soles de Mexicali in 2012 where he played 43 games for them and averaged 18.8 points and 3.2 rebounds.

Graham was signed by Indios de Mayagüez of the Baloncesto Superior Nacional of Puerto Rico on March 17, 2014, but only played 5 games for them.

Graham was signed by Caciques de Humacao on April 19, 2014. He played 15 games for them.

In September 2014, he returned to Soles de Mexicali. In 50 games with them he averaged 20.8 points and 4.1 rebounds per game. On May 9, 2015, he signed with Brujos de Guayama of Puerto Rico for the 2015 BSN season.

On August 21, 2015, he signed with the Spanish club Estudiantes of the Liga ACB. On December 29, 2015, he parted ways with Estudiantes after appearing in seven games.

On September 18, 2016, Graham won the FIBA Intercontinental Cup with Guaros de Lara, and was named the FIBA Intercontinental Cup MVP after scoring 19 points in the game.

On December 16, 2017, Graham signed with the Israeli team Maccabi Haifa.

On July 11, 2018, Graham returned to Caciques de Humacao for a second stint, signing for the rest of the 2018 BSN Season.

=== Aguada ===
In June 2019 Graham signed with Aguada to play the finals of the LUB, he finished the tournament with 21 points per game, it was decisive for Aguada to be champions of the tournament.

=== Flamengo ===
In July 2019 Graham signed with NBB team Flamengo.
