= Maurice Sutton =

American basketball player (born 1989)

Mahram Tehran BC
- Position: Power forward / center
- League: Iranian Basketball Super League

Personal information
- Born: July 31, 1989 (age 37) Largo, Maryland
- Listed height: 6 ft 11 in (2.11 m)
- Listed weight: 220 lb (100 kg)

Career information
- High school: Largo (Largo, Maryland)
- College: Villanova (2009–2013)
- NBA draft: 2013: undrafted
- Playing career: 2013–present

Career history
- 2013–2015: Tulsa 66ers / Oklahoma City Blue
- 2015: Titanes del Distrito Nacional
- 2015: Enriquillo
- 2015: Śląsk Wrocław
- 2016: Metros de Santiago
- 2016: Pueblo Nuevo
- 2016: Cocodrilos de Caracas
- 2016: Titanes del Distrito Nacional
- 2016: Enriquillo
- 2017: Cocodrilos de Caracas
- 2017: Jose Horacio Rodriguez
- 2017: Enriquillo
- 2017–2018: Aguacateros de Michoacán
- 2018: Rafael Barias
- 2018: Gregorio Urbano Gilbert
- 2018: Leones de Santo Domingo
- 2018–2019: Aguacateros de Michoacán
- 2019: Abejas de León
- 2019: Dosa
- 2020–present: Mahram Tehran BC
- Stats at Basketball Reference

Maurice Sutton Jr. (born July 31, 1989) is an American professional basketball player for Mahram Tehran BC of the Iranian Basketball Super League. He played college basketball for Villanova University and then carved out a career in Latin America.

== High school career ==
Sutton attended Largo High School in Largo, Maryland. As a senior, he averaged 18 points, 13 rebounds and nine blocks per game in 2007–08.

== College career ==
Sutton attended Villanova University in 2008–09, but did not play and chose to redshirt the season as to maintain his four seasons of eligibility.

In his freshman season at Villanova University, Sutton played sparingly for the Wildcats. In 26 games, he averaged 1.8 points, 2.3 rebounds and 1.0 blocks in 10.3 minutes per game.

In his sophomore season, his production increased slightly but he still had a similar bench role to his freshman season. In 27 games, he averaged 2.4 points 2.3 rebounds and 1.0 blocks in 10.6 minutes per game.

In his junior season, he became a regular rotation player over the final six weeks of the season. In 25 games (7 starts), he averaged 3.6 points and 3.1 rebounds in 13.7 minutes per game.

In his senior season, he finished his career with 100 blocks, which ranks 11th all-time at Villanova. In 31 games (10 starts), he averaged 3.2 points and 2.7 rebounds in 9.5 minutes per game.

== Professional career ==
Between 2013 and 2015, Sutton played in the NBA Development League for the Tulsa 66ers and then the renamed Oklahoma City Blue. In 91 regular season games over two D-League season, Sutton averaged 7.9 points, 5.9 rebounds and 1.2 blocks per game. He also had three NBA Summer League stints with the Washington Wizards (2013), Oklahoma City Thunder (2014), and the D-League Select Team (2015).

Since 2015, Sutton has played mostly in Latin America—apart from a stint in Poland with Śląsk Wrocław to start the 2015–16 season—splitting his time in the Dominican Republic, Venezuela and Mexico. He spent the 2017–18 and 2018–19 seasons in the Mexican LNBP with Aguacateros de Michoacán, and then started the 2019–20 season with Abejas de León, but was released on October 14, 2019. In November 2019, he played for Dosa in the XXVI Torneo de Baloncesto Superior.

On March 6, 2020, Sutton signed with Iranian team Mahram Tehran BC.

== Personal ==
Sutton is the son of Maurice Sr. and Gwen Sutton, and has two older siblings, Terry Barnes and Candace Sutton-Pearson. His cousin is former NBA player, Chris Gatling.
