= Luis Bethelmy =

Venezuelan basketball player (born 1986)

No. 11 – Piratas de Los Lagos
- Position: Power forward

Personal information
- Born: 14 October 1986 (age 40)
- Listed height: 6 ft 7 in (2.01 m)

Career information
- NBA draft: 2008: undrafted
- Playing career: 2007–present

Career history
- 2007-2009: Cocodrilos de Caracas
- 2009-2010: Ángeles de Puebla
- 2010-2014: Cocodrilos de Caracas
- 2011-2013: Halcones Rojos Veracruz
- 2014: Guerreros de Bogotá
- 2015-2019: Guaros de Lara
- 2018-2019: Indios San Francisco Macoris
- 2019-2020: Gimnasia y Esgrima (CR)
- 2019-2020: Defensor Sporting
- 2020-2021: Centauros de Portuguesa
- 2021-2023: Cocodrilos de Caracas
- 2023-present: Piratas de Los Lagos
Medals
Men's basketball
Representing Venezuela
South American Basketball Championship
Gold medal – first place	2014 Venezuela
Gold medal – first place	2016 Venezuela
Bronze medal – third place	2008 Chile

Luis Miguel Bethelmy Villarroel (born 14 October 1986) is a Venezuelan professional basketball player who plays in the power forward position for the Venezuela national basketball team and currently plays for Piratas de Los Lagos in the Liga BásquetPro league. He is nicknamed as "the Tsunami". Luis was part of the Venezuelan squad during the 2019 FIBA Basketball World Cup, where the team ended up at 14th position.

== National team career ==
Luis Bethelmy made his senior international debut for Venezuela during the 2007 FIBA Americas Championship. He has represented Venezuela at the Pan American Games twice in 2015, 2019 and also took part at the 2009 FIBA Americas Championship and 2013 FIBA Americas Championship. He made his FIBA Basketball World Cup debut for Venezuela at the 2019 edition, which also saw Venezuela's return to the tournament for the first time since 2006 FIBA Basketball World Cup.

== Club career ==
He made his club debut for Cocodrilos de Caracas in 2007 before being drafted into NBA in 2008. He was part of the Guaros de Lara club which was crowned world basketball club champions at the 2016 FIBA Intercontinental Cup, after beating the German club Skyliners Frankfurt in the final. He was also member of the Guaros de Lara club which emerged as runners-up to Spanish club Iberostar Tenerife at the 2017 FIBA Intercontinental Cup.
