= Alvin Cruz =

Personal information
- Born: April 24, 1982 (age 44) San Juan, Puerto Rico
- Listed height: 6 ft 1 in (1.85 m)
- Listed weight: 185 lb (84 kg)

Career information
- High school: Florida Air Academy (Melbourne, Florida)
- College: Niagara (2001–2005)
- NBA draft: 2005: undrafted
- Playing career: 2005–present
- Position: Point guard
- Number: 10, 28

Career history
- 2005: Erdgas Basket Jena
- 2005: Turow Zgorzelec
- 2006: Znicz Sokolow Jaroslaw
- 2006–2007: Vaqueros de Bayamón
- 2008: Soproni KC
- 2008–2009: Gigantes de Carolina
- 2010: Leones de Ponce
- 2010–2011: Fuerza Regia Monterrey
- 2011–2012: Piratas de Quebradillas
- 2013: Mets de Guaynabo
- 2014–2017: Capitanes de Arecibo
- 2018: Cariduros de Fajardo
- 2018: Caballos de Coclé
- 2019: Leones de Ponce
- 2020: Vaqueros de Bayamón
- 2021: Vaqueros de Bayamón
- 2022: Grises de Humacao

Career highlights
- BSN champion (2016, 2020); Panamá Guard of the Year (2018)

Alvin Cruz (born April 24, 1982) is a professional basketball player who played for the Niagara University men's university basketball team from 2001 to 2005. He is currently playing in the Baloncesto Superior Nacional for the Grises de Humacao. Born in San Juan, Puerto Rico, Cruz played with the Puerto Rico U21 National Team-01 and Puerto Rico National Team-05 as well as in several different professional teams overseas.

== Early years ==
Cruz was born in San Juan, Puerto Rico. He attended Florida Air Academy in Melbourne, Florida, a private military academy, and played high school basketball for the Florida Air Falcons. The Falcons won state championship while undefeated during his senior season.

== Career Highs ==
Alvin is #2 on the all time assist list at Niagara University with 630 assists. Alvin is one of the top 50 players in the all time assist list in the Baloncesto Superior Nacional. In 2020, he set a new career record in assists with a 5.8 average, while also being the top leader in a/e (assists per errors) for the season.

Awarded Guard of the Year in 2018 at the Professional Basketball League in Panama for averaging 18.9 ppg, 4.8 rebounds and 4.9 assists.

== Professional career ==
After playing for the Niagara Purple Eagles in college, Cruz performed as a professional basketball player overseas in Europe and Mexico. In 2008, he started for the Soproni sÖrdögök in the Hungary-A Division where he averaged 17.6 ppg.

Since 2006 he has played and started for eight teams in the Puerto Rican professional basketball league Baloncesto Superior Nacional. He played for the Capitanes de Arecibo from 2014 to 2017, reaching the league finals on 4 seasons and winning the championship in 2016. In 2018, he was playing for the Cariduros de Fajardo, and received an Honorable Mention in the BSN. He played for the Caballos de Coclé in the Professional Basketball League in Panama and in 2018 was awarded Guard of the Year.

He played in the FIBA Americas League representing Puerto Rico and Arecibo from 2014 to 2017.
