= Gabriel Deck =

Argentine-Spanish basketball player (born 1995)

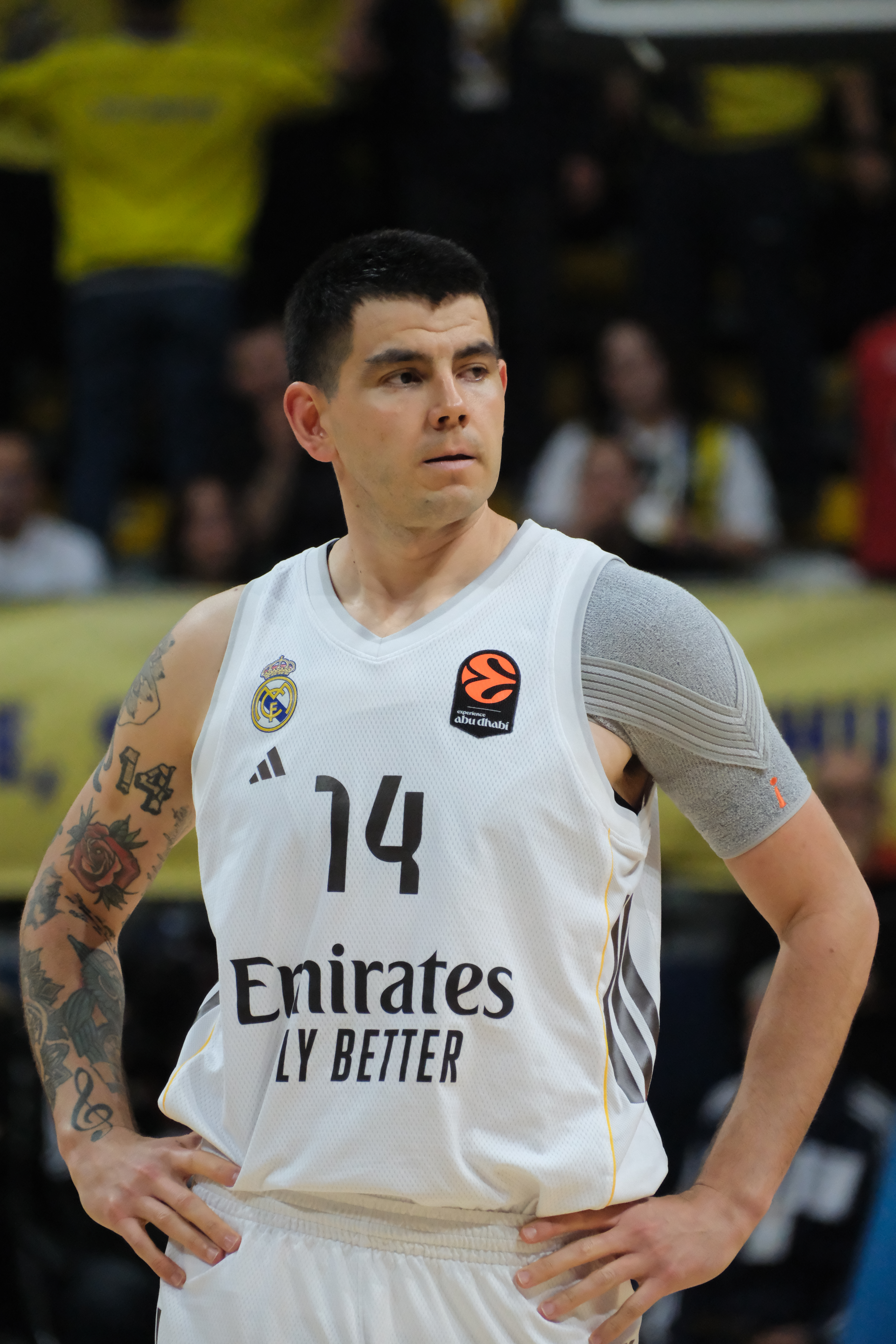
- Deck with Real Madrid in 2026

No. 14 – Real Madrid
- Position: Power forward / small forward
- League: Liga ACB; EuroLeague

Personal information
- Born: February 8, 1995 (age 31) Añatuya, Argentina
- Listed height: 6 ft 6 in (1.98 m)
- Listed weight: 231 lb (105 kg)

Career information
- NBA draft: 2017: undrafted
- Playing career: 2010–present

Career history
- 2010–2016: Quimsa
- 2016–2018: San Lorenzo
- 2018–2021: Real Madrid
- 2021–2022: Oklahoma City Thunder
- 2022–present: Real Madrid

Career highlights
- EuroLeague champion (2023); EuroLeague SuperCup champion (2026); FIBA Americas League champion (2018); FIBA Americas League Grand Final MVP (2018); 3× LNB champion (2015, 2017, 2018); Super 8 Tournament winner (2014); Super 4 Tournament winner (2017); LNB MVP (2018); 2× LNB Finals MVP (2017, 2018); LNB Most Improved Player (2015); LNB Best Young Player (2018); 2× Liga ACB champion (2019, 2022); Copa del Rey winner (2020); 4× Spanish Supercup winner (2018–2022); FIBA AmeriCup MVP (2022); No. 14 retired by Quimsa
- Stats at NBA.com
- Stats at Basketball Reference
Medals
Men's basketball
Representing Argentina
World Cup
Silver medal – second place	2019 China
FIBA AmeriCup
Gold medal – first place	2022 Brazil
Silver medal – second place	2015 Mexico City
Silver medal – second place	2017 Argentina
Pan American Games
Gold medal – first place	2019 Lima

Gabriel Alejandro "Gaby" Deck (born February 8, 1995) is an Argentine-Spanish professional basketball player for Real Madrid of the Liga ACB and the EuroLeague. At a height of 1.98 m (6 ft 6 in) he can play at both the small forward and power forward positions.

== Early career ==
In August 2011, Deck attended the Basketball Without Borders camp held in Rio de Janeiro, Brazil. He was named the camp's most valuable player. He later played at the Nike Hoops Summit in 2013.

== Professional career ==
=== Quimsa (2010–2016) ===
Deck started his professional career with the Argentinian LNB club Quimsa.

=== San Lorenzo (2016–2018) ===
In 2016, Deck joined the Argentine club San Lorenzo. With San Lorenzo, he won the 2018 FIBA Americas League championship while also being named the league's Grand Final MVP. Deck was also the competition's top scorer, with a scoring average of 19.1 points per game, over eight games played.

=== Real Madrid (2018–2021) ===
On July 19, 2018, Deck signed a three-year deal with Real Madrid of the Liga ACB and EuroLeague after he reached a buyout agreement with San Lorenzo. In his first season with the club, he made a debut in the 2018–19 EuroLeague season, averaging 4.4 points and 2.4 rebounds over 31 games. He averaged 4.8 points and 2.9 rebounds in the Spanish League over 30 games.

In his last season, Deck appeared in 58 games, averaging 9.7 points, 3.8 rebounds, and 1.2 assists in 23.9 minutes while shooting 52.1 percent from the field.

=== Oklahoma City Thunder (2021–2022) ===
On April 12, 2021, Deck signed a multi-year contract with the Oklahoma City Thunder of the NBA. On April 29, Deck made his debut against the New Orleans Pelicans, scoring two points, grabbing two rebounds and dishing out two assists across 15 minutes in the Thunder's 109–95 loss.

On January 4, 2022, Deck was waived by the Thunder.

=== Return to Real Madrid (2022–present) ===
On January 19, 2022, Deck returned to Real Madrid, signing a two-year deal. On June 28, 2023, Deck renewed his contract with the historic club through 2028.

On October 12, 2026, Deck underwent surgery after tests revealed anterior instability in his left shoulder following a dislocation.

== National team career ==
=== Junior national team ===
With the junior national team of Argentina, Deck was the top scorer of the 2012 FIBA Under-17 World Cup, with an average of 21.5 points per game. He was selected to the All-Tournament Team. He also played at the 2013 FIBA Under-19 World Cup.

=== Senior national team ===
Deck also represented the senior men's Argentine national basketball team at the 2015 FIBA AmeriCup, in Mexico City, where he won a silver medal. He recorded his team's best two-point field goal percentage during the tournament. He also played at the 2016 Summer Olympics and at the 2017 FIBA AmeriCup.

In 2019, he participated in the team that won the Pan American gold medal in Lima.

In 2022, Deck won the gold medal in the 2022 FIBA AmeriCup held in Recife, Brazil. He was Argentina's starting power forward in the tournament. After the final game against Brazil, he was named in the All-Tournament Team and declared the MVP of the championship.

== Career statistics ==
Legend
GP	Games played	GS	Games started	MPG	Minutes per game
FG%	Field-goal percentage	3P%	3-point field-goal percentage	FT%	Free-throw percentage
RPG	Rebounds per game	APG	Assists per game	SPG	Steals per game
BPG	Blocks per game	PPG	Points per game	PIR	Performance index rating
**Bold**	Career high

=== NBA ===
Year	Team	GP	GS	MPG	FG%	3P%	FT%	RPG	APG	SPG	BPG	PPG
2020–21	Oklahoma City	**10**	0	**21.2**	.478	.133	.818	**4.0**	**2.4**	**.8**	.0	**8.4**
2021–22	Oklahoma City	7	0	8.0	**.571**	**.500**	—	.9	.7	.1	.0	2.6
Career		17	0	15.8	.494	.211	.818	2.7	1.7	.5	.0	6.0

=== EuroLeague ===
†	Denotes seasons in which Deck won the EuroLeague

Year	Team	GP	GS	MPG	FG%	3P%	FT%	RPG	APG	SPG	BPG	PPG	PIR
2018–19	Real Madrid	31	11	5.0	**.595**	.333	.698	2.4	.7	.2	.0	4.4	5.4
2019–20	Real Madrid	24	17	20.1	.464	.259	.820	3.2	1.5	.3	**.1**	7.4	8.9
2020–21	Real Madrid	**32**	22	24.1	.490	.407	.843	3.7	1.2	**.7**	.0	8.8	10.3
2021–22	Real Madrid	11	9	25.4	.567	**.471**	.840	4.8	.8	.6	—	9.5	11.1
2022–23†	Real Madrid	31	**23**	**26.0**	.571	.319	.845	**5.4**	**1.9**	.5	**.1**	**12.3**	**15.7**
2023–24	Real Madrid	28	15	21.2	.582	.358	**.878**	3.3	1.1	.6	—	9.0	9.9
Career		157	97	21.6	.541	.357	.826	3.7	1.2	.5	.1	8.5	10.2

== Personal life ==
On August 4, 2026, Deck obtained Spanish citizenship. The process was completed on July 28th after several years of residence in Spain.
