= 2010 NBA All-Star Game =

Exhibition basketball game

	1	2	3	4	Total
East	37	39	42	23	141
West	34	35	40	30	139
- Date: February 14, 2010
- Arena: Cowboys Stadium; American Airlines Center (All-Star contests)
- City: Arlington
- MVP: Dwyane Wade
- National anthem: Gretchen Wilson (US); Canadian Tenors (Canada)
- Halftime show: Alicia Keys, Shakira
- Attendance: 108,713
- Network: TNT
- Announcers: Marv Albert, Doug Collins and Reggie Miller; Kevin Harlan, Reggie Miller, Mike Fratello, Charles Barkley and Kenny Smith (All-Star Saturday Night); Kevin Harlan, Kevin McHale and Dwyane Wade (Rookie Challenge)

NBA All-Star Game
< 2009	2011 >

The 2010 NBA All-Star Game was an exhibition basketball game that was played on February 14, 2010, during the National Basketball Association's (NBA) 2009–10 season. It was the 59th edition of the NBA All-Star Game, and was played at Cowboys Stadium in Arlington, Texas. The Eastern Conference defeated the Western Conference, 141–139. The East's Dwyane Wade, who recorded 28 points on 75% shooting, 11 assists, 6 rebounds and 5 steals, was named as the All-Star Game Most Valuable Player. This was the second time that the Dallas/Fort Worth metropolitan area had hosted the All-Star Game; the area had previously hosted the event in 1986. Dallas was awarded the 2010 All-Star Game in an announcement by commissioner David Stern on October 30, 2008.

The All-Star Weekend began on Friday, February 12, 2010, with the Celebrity Game and the Rookie Challenge, a game between the league's best rookies and second-year players. On Saturday, the event continued with the All-Star Saturday Night, which featured the Shooting Stars Competition, Skills Challenge, Three-Point Shootout, Slam Dunk Contest and H–O–R–S–E Competition. The D-League All-Star Game and the second D-League Dream Factory Friday Night, the latter of which was modeled after the NBA All-Star Saturday Night, also took place during the All-Star Weekend. The D-League Dream Factory Friday Night was held on Friday and the D-League All-Star Game was held on Saturday. In the Rookie Challenge, the Rookies defeated the Sophomores for the first time since 2002, with Rookies' Tyreke Evans named as the game MVP. In the All-Star Saturday Night events, Nate Robinson won his third Slam Dunk Contest while Paul Pierce and Steve Nash won the Three-Point Shootout and Skills Challenge respectively. Team Texas, the home team, won the Shootings Stars Competition. Kevin Durant repeated as champion in the H–O–R–S–E Competition.

The announced attendance for the All-Star Game was 108,713, the all-time attendance record for the sport. The previous verified record for attendance at a basketball game was 78,129, set in a December 13, 2003 game between Kentucky and Michigan State at Ford Field in Detroit. The final of the 1968 European Cup Winners' Cup between AEK Athens and Slavia Prague at Panathinaiko Stadium in Athens is believed to have had an attendance of 120,000 but that total was not verified at the time. The previous record attendance for an NBA All-Star Game was 44,735, set at the Houston Astrodome for the 1989 All-Star Game. This event also broke the record for the single largest attendance for an indoor event, previously held by WrestleMania III in 1987.

This marked the first All-Star game where neither team wore a white uniform. The East wore blue uniforms with silver trim, while the West wore red uniforms with gold trim.

== Venues ==
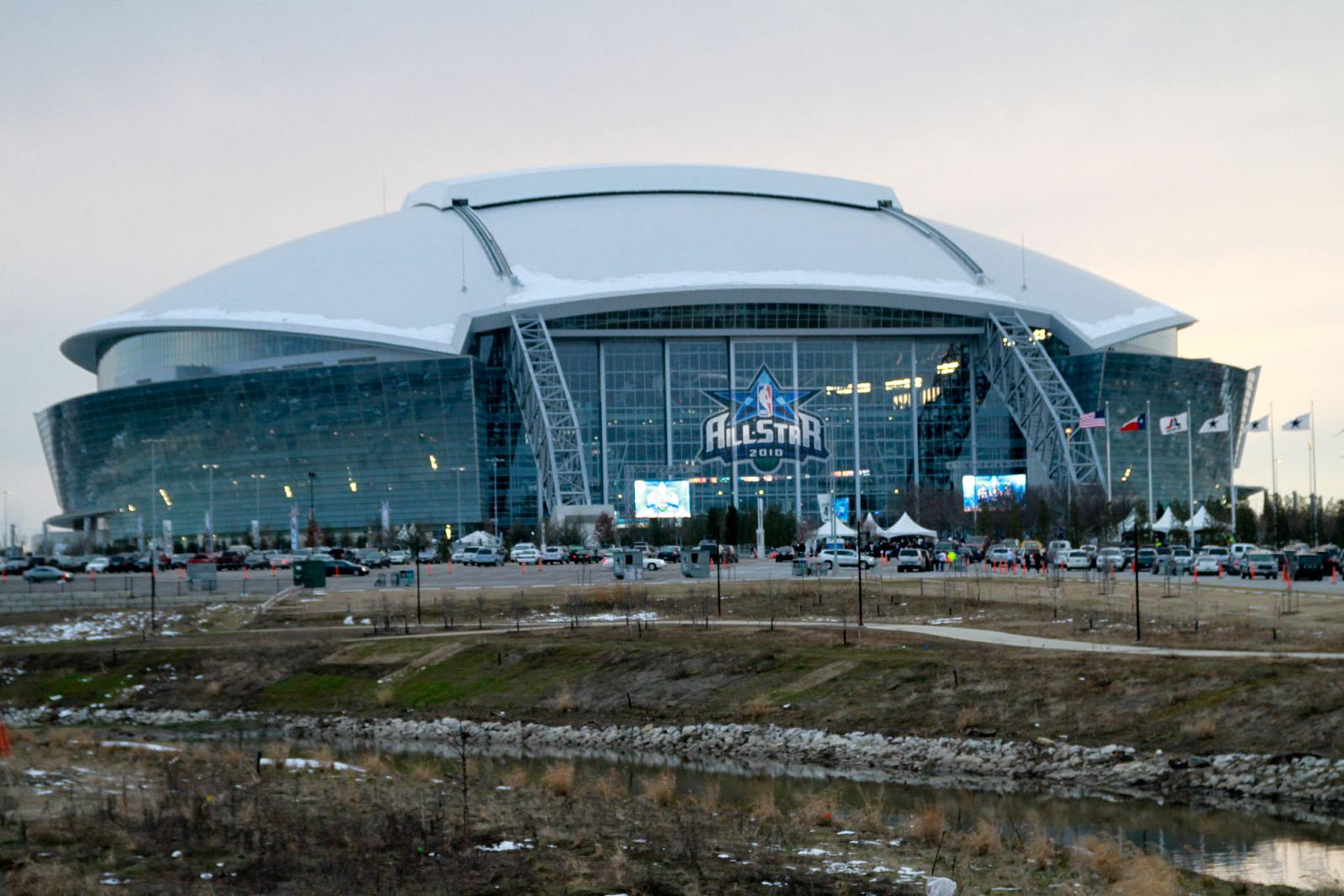
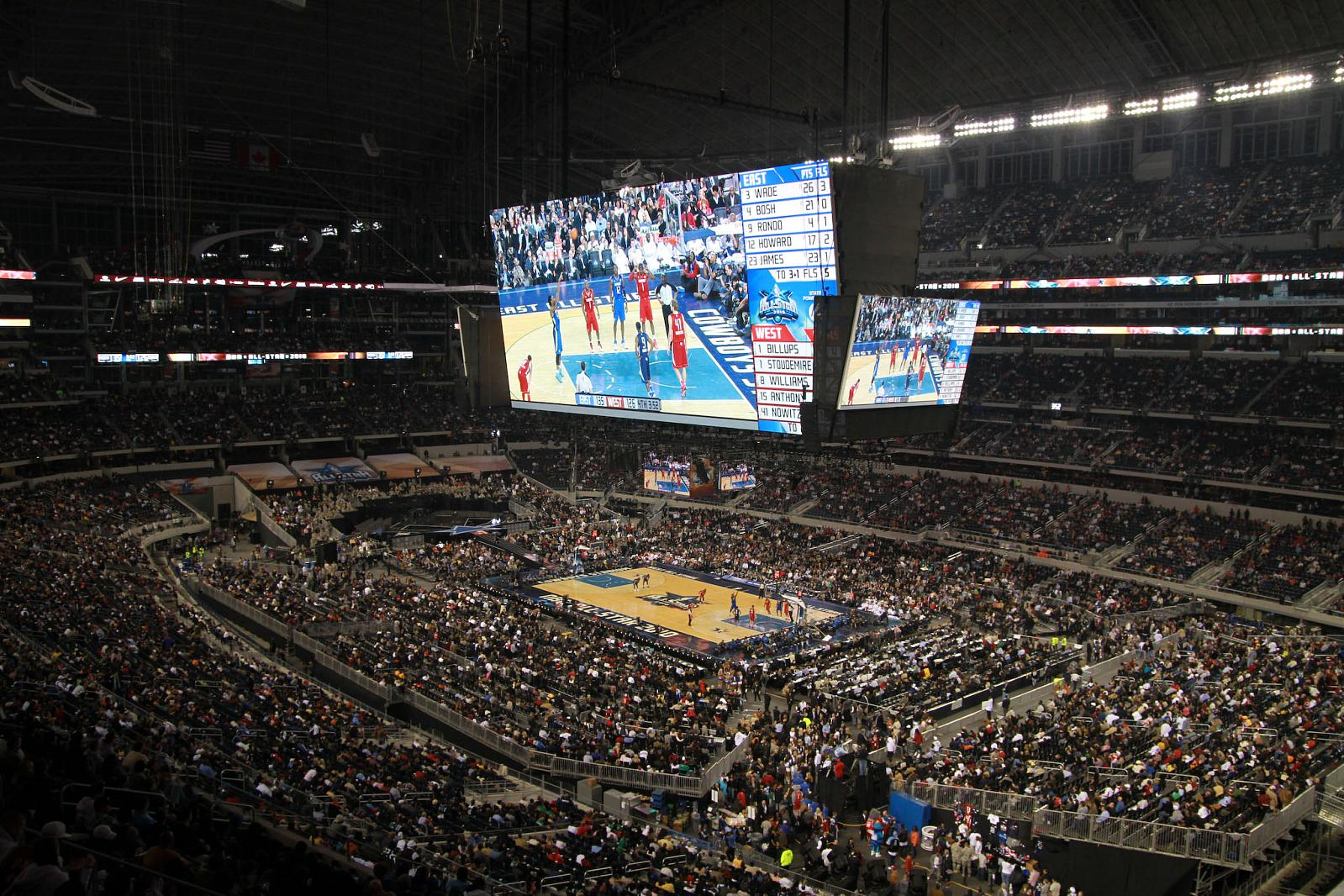
Cowboys Stadium was the host venue of the 2010 NBA All-Star Game.

The Dallas Mavericks served as host of an All-Star Game for the second time in franchise history; they previously hosted the 1986 All-Star Game at their former home court, the Reunion Arena in Dallas.

The venue for the game on February 14 was Cowboys Stadium, home of the National Football League's Dallas Cowboys, while the Rookie Challenge and NBA All-Star Saturday Night events were held on February 12 and February 13, 2010, respectively, at American Airlines Center, home of the Mavericks. This marked the first time the All-Star events were split between two venues since 1989.

The Mavericks were awarded the All-Star Game in an announcement by NBA commissioner David Stern on October 30, 2008. This was the first All-Star Game to be played in a football stadium since 1996 when San Antonio's Alamodome hosted the event.

== All-Star Game ==
=== Coaches ===
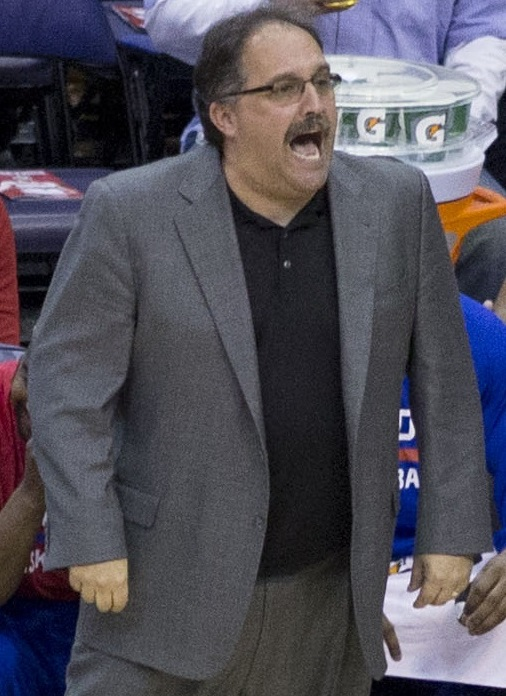
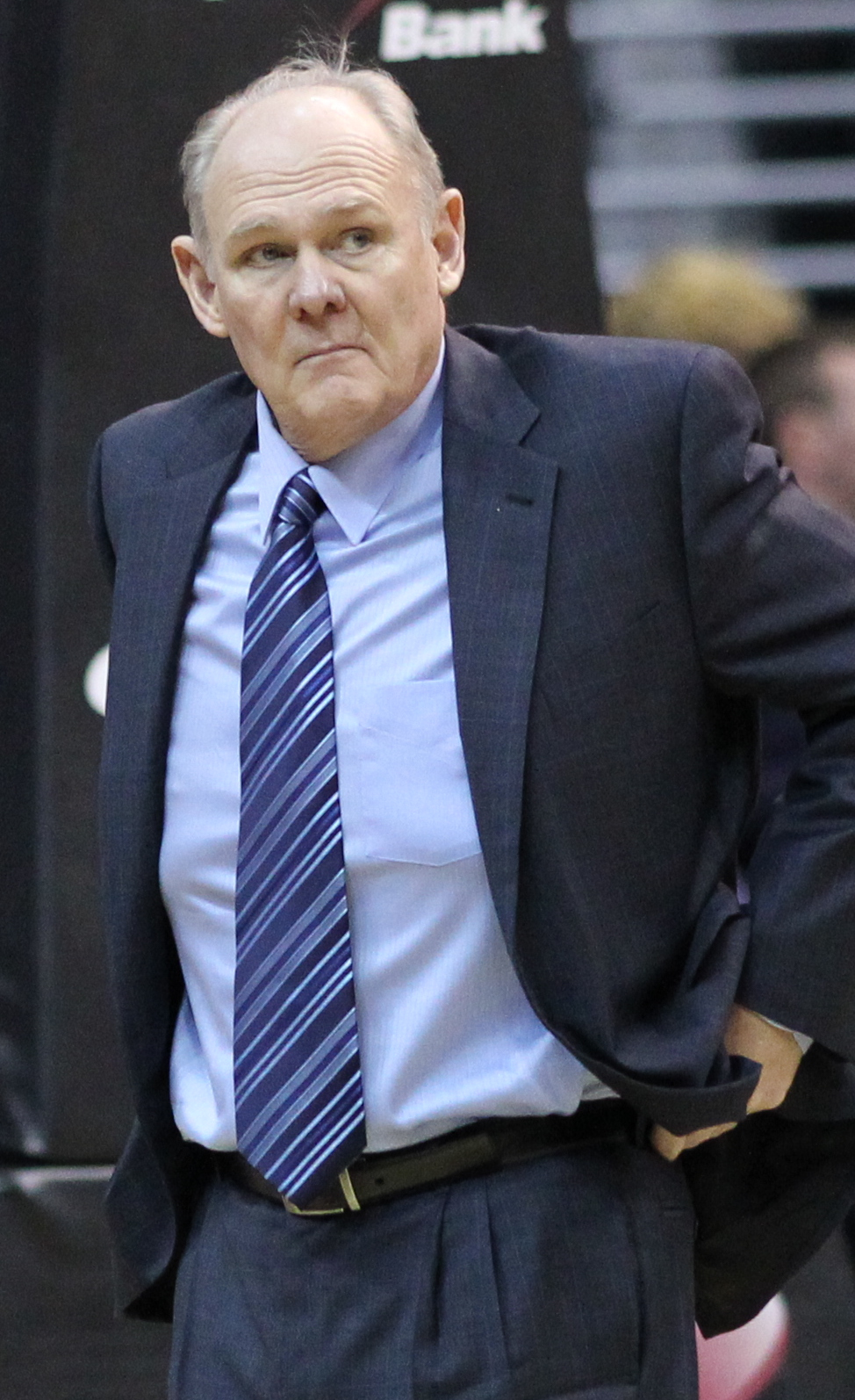
Stan Van Gundy (left) and George Karl were selected as the East and West head coach, respectively.

The coaches for the All-Star Game are the head coaches of the teams with the best winning percentage in each conference through the games of January 31, two weeks before the All-Star Game. However, an NBA rule also prohibits a coach from being selected for consecutive All-Star Games. Because Phil Jackson and Mike Brown coached in the 2009 All-Star Game, they were not eligible for selection, even though their teams (respectively the Los Angeles Lakers and Cleveland Cavaliers) had the best winning percentages in their respective conferences at the January 31 cutoff date.

The coach for the Western Conference team was Denver Nuggets head coach George Karl. This is the fourth time Karl was selected to be an All-Star coach, after previous selections in 1994, 1996 and 1998. At January 31, the Nuggets had 32–15 record, the second best winning percentage in the Western Conference, behind Phil Jackson's Lakers. The coach for the Eastern Conference team was Orlando Magic head coach Stan Van Gundy. This is the second time Van Gundy was selected to be an All-Star coach, after previously being selected in 2005. At January 31, the Magic had 32–16 record, the second best winning percentage in the Eastern Conference, behind Mike Brown's Cavaliers.

=== Players ===
The rosters for the All-Star Game are chosen in two ways. The starters were chosen via a fan ballot. Two guards, two forwards and one center who receive the highest vote were named the All-Star starters. The reserves were chosen by votes among the NBA head coaches in their respective conferences. The coaches were not permitted to vote for their own players. The reserves consists of two guards, two forwards, one center and two players regardless of position. If a player is unable to participate due to injury, the commissioner will select a replacement.

LeBron James of the Cleveland Cavaliers topped the All-Star Ballots with 2,549,693 votes, which earned him a starting position in the Eastern Conference team. Allen Iverson, who retired briefly before returning to play for the Philadelphia 76ers, earned his eleventh straight selection to the All-Star roster. Dwyane Wade, Kevin Garnett and Dwight Howard completed the Eastern Conference starting position. These five starters also started in the previous year's Eastern Conference team. The Eastern Conference reserves includes 4 first-time selections, Rajon Rondo, Derrick Rose, Gerald Wallace and Al Horford. Wallace became the first player to represent the Charlotte Bobcats in the All-Star game, while Rose became the first All-Star for the Chicago Bulls since Michael Jordan.

The Western Conference leading vote-getter is Kobe Bryant with 2,456,224 votes. Two-time MVP Steve Nash returned after missing out on the All-Star roster the previous year. Carmelo Anthony, Tim Duncan and Amar'e Stoudemire completed the Western Conference starting position. Bryant, Duncan and Stoudemire all started in last year's game, although Stoudemire was listed as a forward then. Dallas Mavericks' Dirk Nowitzki represented the home town after being selected as a reserve. The Western Conference reserves includes 3 first-time selections, Kevin Durant, Zach Randolph and Deron Williams, who grew up and starred in high school in the Dallas area.

Four players missed the game: Kobe Bryant, Chris Paul and Brandon Roy due to injury; Allen Iverson for personal reasons. As a result, four more were named to the roster as replacements: Chauncey Billups for Paul, Chris Kaman for Roy, Jason Kidd for Bryant and David Lee for Iverson. Both Kaman and Lee are first-time selections. Eastern Conference coach Stan Van Gundy selected Joe Johnson to replace Iverson in the starting lineup, while Western Conference coach George Karl selected Dirk Nowitzki to replace Bryant in the starting lineup.

=== Roster ===
Eastern Conference All-Stars
Pos.	Player	Team	# of selections	Total votes
Starters
G	Allen Iverson^{DNP} ^{1}	Philadelphia 76ers	11th	1,269,568
G	Dwyane Wade	Miami Heat	6th	2,327,550
F	LeBron James	Cleveland Cavaliers	6th	2,549,693
F	Kevin Garnett	Boston Celtics	13th	1,978,116
C	Dwight Howard	Orlando Magic	4th	2,360,096
Reserves
G	Joe Johnson^{1}	Atlanta Hawks	4th	—
G	Rajon Rondo	Boston Celtics	1st	—
G	Derrick Rose	Chicago Bulls	1st	—
F	Paul Pierce	Boston Celtics	8th	—
F	Gerald Wallace	Charlotte Bobcats	1st	—
F	Chris Bosh	Toronto Raptors	5th	—
F/C	Al Horford	Atlanta Hawks	1st	—
C	David Lee^{REP}	New York Knicks	1st	—
Head coach: Stan Van Gundy (Orlando Magic)

Western Conference All-Stars
Pos.	Player	Team	# of selections	Total votes
Starters
G	Steve Nash	Phoenix Suns	7th	1,222,235
G	Kobe Bryant^{INJ} ^{2}	Los Angeles Lakers	12th	2,456,224
F	Carmelo Anthony	Denver Nuggets	3rd	2,137,560
F	Tim Duncan	San Antonio Spurs	12th	1,156,696
C	Amar'e Stoudemire	Phoenix Suns	5th	1,824,093
Reserves
G	Chauncey Billups^{REP}	Denver Nuggets	5th	—
G	Jason Kidd^{REP}	Dallas Mavericks	10th	—
G	Chris Paul^{INJ}	New Orleans Hornets	3rd	—
G	Brandon Roy^{INJ}	Portland Trail Blazers	3rd	—
G	Deron Williams	Utah Jazz	1st	—
F	Kevin Durant	Oklahoma City Thunder	1st	—
F	Dirk Nowitzki^{2}	Dallas Mavericks	9th	—
F	Zach Randolph	Memphis Grizzlies	1st	—
F/C^{3}	Pau Gasol	Los Angeles Lakers	3rd	—
C	Chris Kaman^{REP}	Los Angeles Clippers	1st	—
Head coach: George Karl (Denver Nuggets)

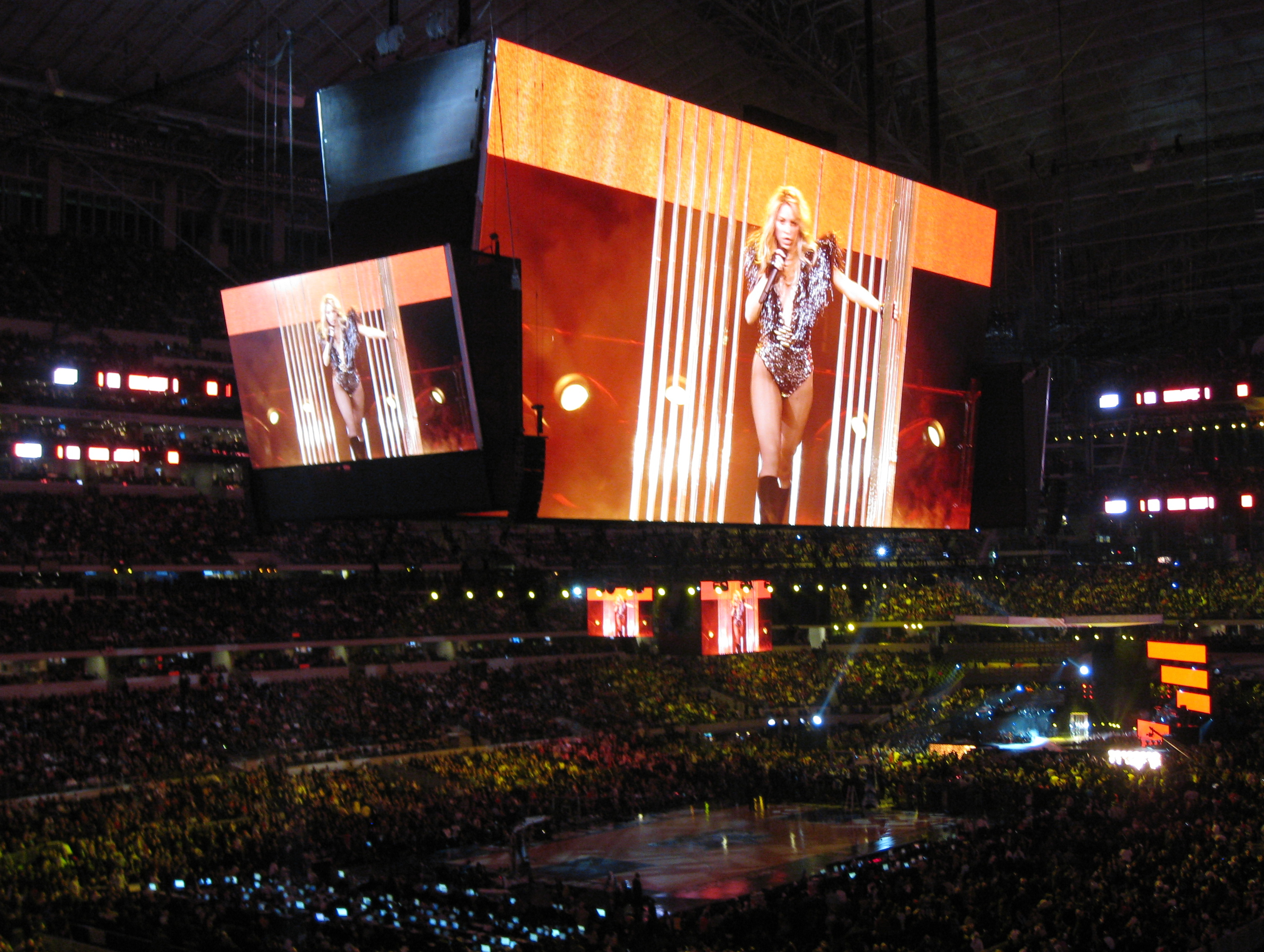
Shakira performing in the halftime show.

^INJ Kobe Bryant, Chris Paul and Brandon Roy did not participate due to injury.
^DNP Allen Iverson did not play for personal reasons.
^REP Chauncey Billups was named as a replacement for Chris Paul, Chris Kaman was named as a replacement for Brandon Roy, Jason Kidd was named as a replacement for Kobe Bryant, and David Lee was named as a replacement for Allen Iverson.
^1 Joe Johnson started in place of Allen Iverson.
^2 Dirk Nowitzki started in place of Kobe Bryant.
^3 Although the NBA listed Pau Gasol as a forward in the All-Star ballot, he was selected as a reserve center by the head coaches.

=== Game ===
TNT

February 14
7:50 p.m. CT

Boxscore

Eastern Conference All-Stars 141, Western Conference All-Stars 139
Scoring by quarter: 37–34, 39–35, 42–40, 23–30
Pts: Dwyane Wade 28; Rebs: Chris Bosh 10; Asts: Dwyane Wade 11	Pts: Carmelo Anthony 27; Rebs: Anthony, Stoudemire 10 each Asts: Steve Nash 13

Cowboys Stadium, Arlington, Texas
Attendance: 108,713
Referees:
- #48 Scott Foster
- #19 James Capers
- #63 Derek Richardson

== All-Star Weekend ==
=== Rookie Challenge ===
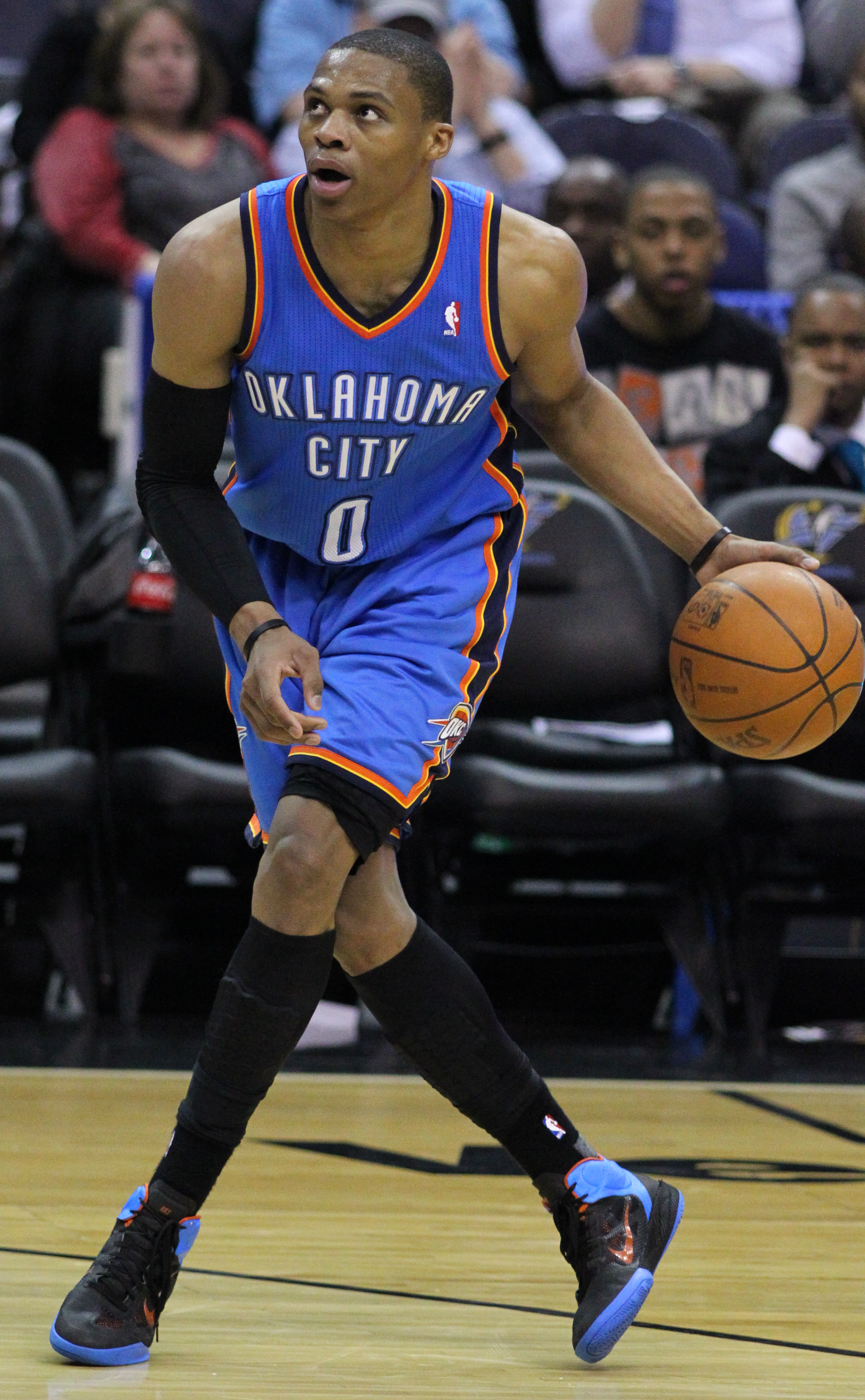
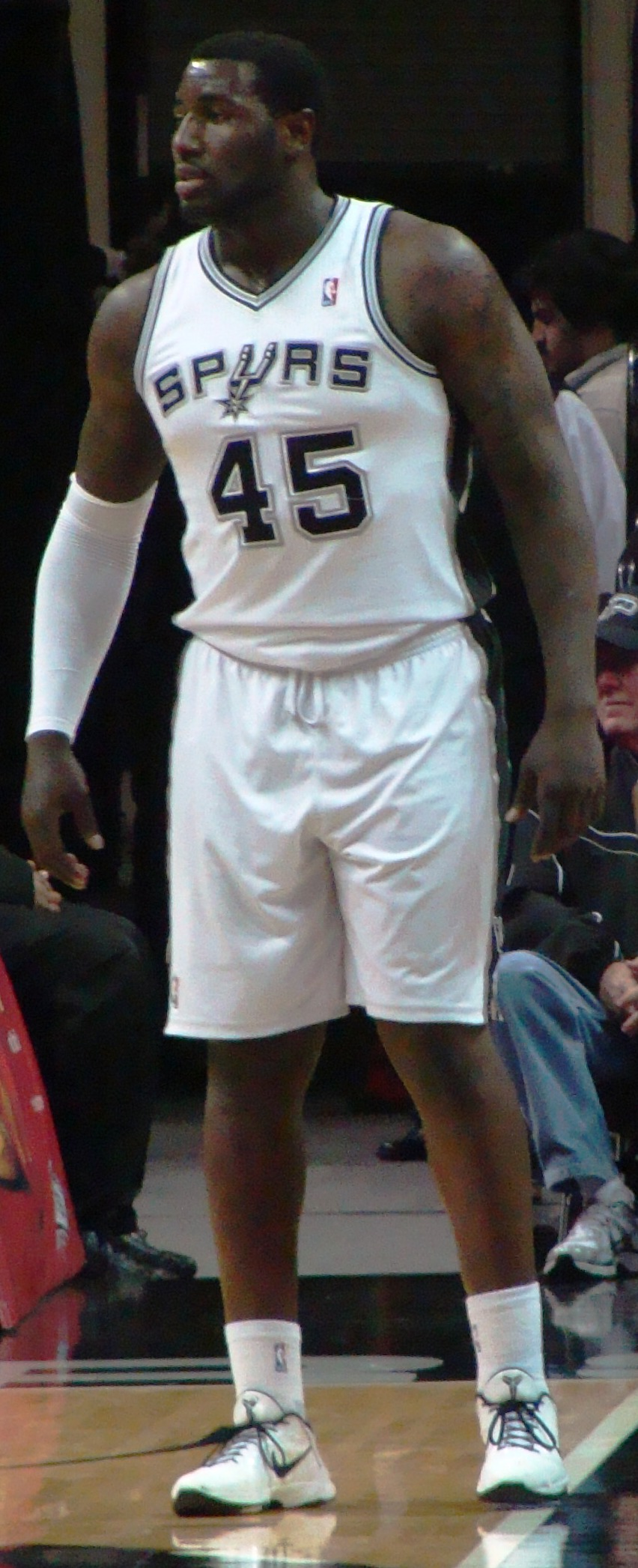
Russell Westbrook (left) scored a game-high 40 points for the Sophomores while DeJuan Blair (right) recorded a game-high 23 rebounds for the Rookies.

The T-Mobile Rookie Challenge featured a team of standout first-year players ('Rookies') against a team of standout second-year players ('Sophomores'). The game was divided into two twenty-minute halves, similar to college basketball. The participating players were chosen by voting among the league's assistant coaches. The Rookie team included five of the top ten picks from the 2009 NBA draft: Stephen Curry, Tyreke Evans, Jonny Flynn, James Harden and Brandon Jennings. The Sophomores team featured seven players from the previous Rookie Challenge game: Michael Beasley, Marc Gasol, Eric Gordon, Brook Lopez, O. J. Mayo, Derrick Rose and Russell Westbrook. However, Rose was later replaced by Anthony Morrow due to Rose's selection to the Skills Challenge and the All-Star Game.

The head coaches for the Rookies and Sophomores teams were the lead assistants from the All-Star Game coaching staffs, Adrian Dantley from the Denver Nuggets and Patrick Ewing from the Orlando Magic. They were assisted by two All-Stars who served as assistant coach, Kevin Durant and Chris Bosh. Durant participated in his third successive Rookie Challenge game, after playing as a rookie and sophomore in the last two years. Bosh, a Dallas native, returned to his hometown where he grew up and starred in high school basketball. Dantley and Durant coached the Rookie team while Ewing and Bosh coached the Sophomore team.

At halftime, sophomore Eric Gordon and rookie DeMar DeRozan competed in the inaugural NBA All-Star Slam Dunk-In, a single-round slam dunk competition to determine the fourth participant of the Slam Dunk Contest on Saturday. DeRozan, who was not part of the Rookie team, earned 61% of the fans vote to defeat Eric Gordon and won a spot to compete in the Slam Dunk Contest.

Rookies
Pos.	Player	Team
F/C	DeJuan Blair	San Antonio Spurs
F	Omri Casspi	Sacramento Kings
G	Stephen Curry	Golden State Warriors
G	Tyreke Evans	Sacramento Kings
G	Jonny Flynn	Minnesota Timberwolves
F	Taj Gibson	Chicago Bulls
G	James Harden	Oklahoma City Thunder
G	Brandon Jennings	Milwaukee Bucks
F	Jonas Jerebko	Detroit Pistons
Head coach: Adrian Dantley (Denver Nuggets)
Assistant coach: Kevin Durant (Oklahoma City Thunder)

Sophomores
Pos.	Player	Team
F	Michael Beasley	Miami Heat
C	Marc Gasol	Memphis Grizzlies
F	Danilo Gallinari	New York Knicks
G	Eric Gordon	Los Angeles Clippers
C	Brook Lopez	New Jersey Nets
F/C	Kevin Love	Minnesota Timberwolves
G	O. J. Mayo	Memphis Grizzlies
G	Anthony Morrow^{REP}	Golden State Warriors
G	Derrick Rose^{DNP}	Chicago Bulls
G	Russell Westbrook	Oklahoma City Thunder
Head coach: Patrick Ewing (Orlando Magic)
Assistant coach: Chris Bosh (Toronto Raptors)

^DNP Derrick Rose was excused from the Rookie Challenge in consideration of being named to the All-Star Game and his participation in the Skills Challenge.
^REP Anthony Morrow was named as a replacement for Derrick Rose.

TNT

February 12
9:00 p.m. ET

Boxscore

Rookies 140, Sophomores 128
Scoring by half: 67–55, 73–73
Pts: Tyreke Evans 26; Rebs: DeJuan Blair 23; Asts: Brandon Jennings 8	Pts: Russell Westbrook 40; Rebs: Beasley, Lopez 7 each Asts: O. J. Mayo 10

American Airlines Center, Dallas
Attendance: 19,200
Referees:
- #67 John Goble
- #65 Sean Wright
- #60 David Guthrie

The Rookies won the game 140–128, ending the Sophomores' seven-game win streak and winning the Rookie Challenge for the first time since 2002. Rookie's Tyreke Evans was named MVP; he had 26 points, 6 rebounds and 5 assists. DeJuan Blair scored 22 points and notched a record 23 rebounds, becoming the first player to have a 20–20 game in the Rookie Challenge. Sophomore's Russell Westbrook had a game-high 40 points in a losing effort. It was the second time a player has reached the 40-point mark, since Kevin Durant had 46 points last year. The Rookies were up by 12 at halftime, the largest lead of the game. Westbrook, who had 11 points at halftime, took over and scored 29 points in the second half. But strong plays enabled the Rookies to keep the lead for the rest of the game.

=== Slam Dunk Contest ===
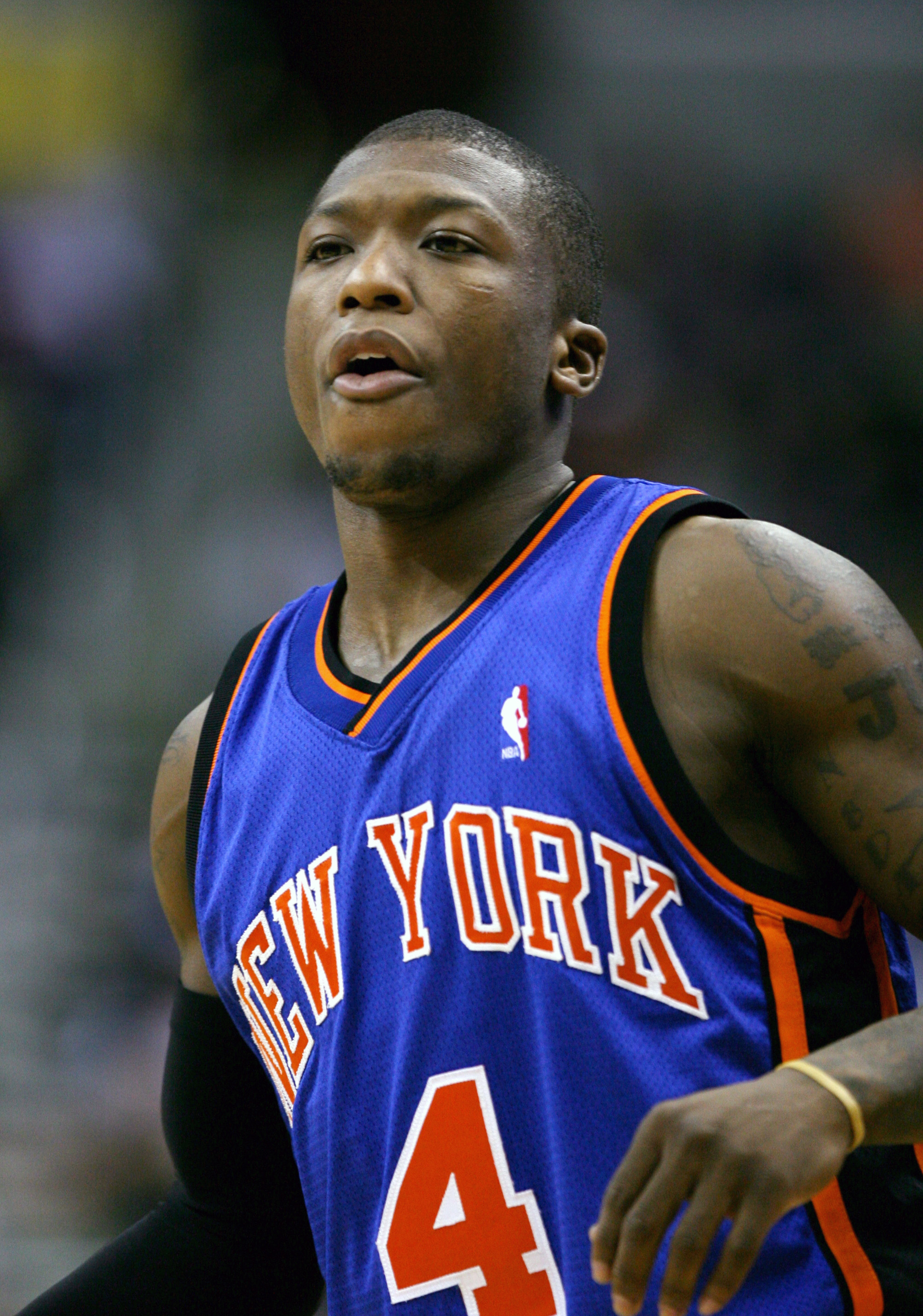
Nate Robinson won the 2010 Sprite Slam Dunk Contest, becoming the first three-time champion.

The Sprite Slam Dunk Contest was contested by defending champion Nate Robinson, All-Star Gerald Wallace, Shannon Brown and DeMar DeRozan. The fourth contestant was determined through the first ever NBA All-Star Dunk-In, a single-round slam dunk competition that was held at halftime of the Rookie Challenge game. The opening matchup between DeRozan and Eric Gordon ended with DeRozan winning 61% of the online fan vote and the final spot in the Saturday competition.

The Slam Dunk Contest was held the following night. Each of the four contestants performed two slam dunks in the first round. A panel of five judges, including former champion Dominique Wilkins and Spud Webb, then scored the dunks to determine the final round pairing. DeRozan's scored 92 points in the first round, including a 50-point dunk to advance to the finals. Robinson scored 89 points and also advanced to the finals, in which he was narrowly victorious in his effort to repeat. Robinson incorporated the Dallas Cowboys Cheerleaders his final round dunks, which earned him 51% of the fan vote, thus making him the first three-time dunk contest winner. After accepting the trophy, Robinson announced his retirement from any future dunk contests.

Contestants
Pos.	Player	Team	Height	Weight	First round			Final round
Pos.	Player	Team	Height	Weight	1st dunk	2nd dunk	Total	Votes
G	Nate Robinson	New York Knicks	5–8	180	44	45	89	51%
G	DeMar DeRozan	Toronto Raptors	6–7	220	42	50	92	49%
G	Shannon Brown	Los Angeles Lakers	6–4	205	37	41	78	—
F	Gerald Wallace	Charlotte Bobcats	6–7	220	38	40	78	—

Dunk-In contestants
Pos.	Player	Team	Height	Weight	Votes
G	DeMar DeRozan	Toronto Raptors	6–7	220	61%
G	Eric Gordon	Los Angeles Clippers	6–3	222	39%

=== Three-Point Shootout ===
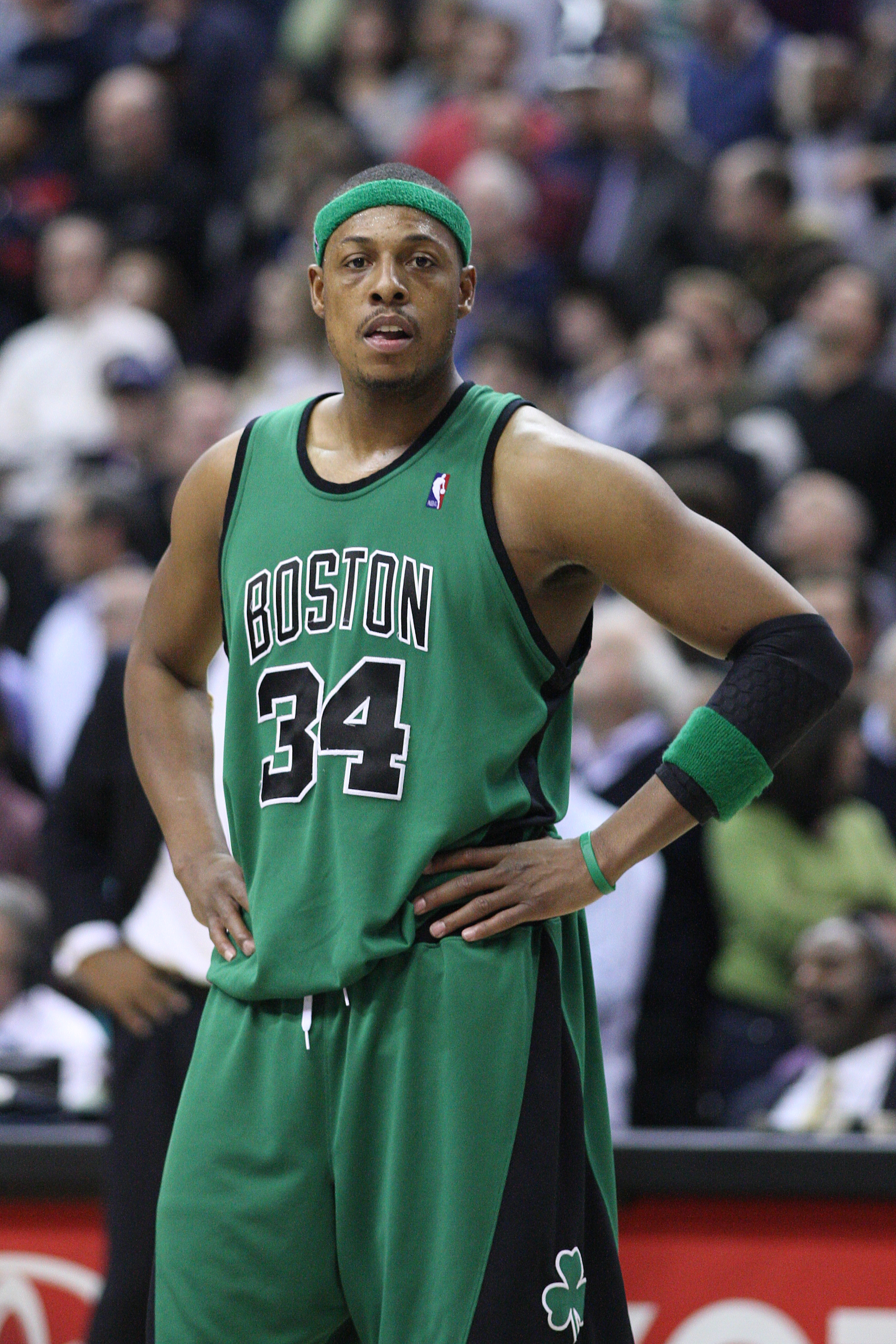
Paul Pierce won the 2010 Foot Locker Three-Point Shootout.

The Foot Locker Three-Point Shootout featured six players: defending champion Daequan Cook returned to defend his title, competing against Chauncey Billups, Paul Pierce, Channing Frye, Danilo Gallinari and rookie Stephen Curry. Frye was the first center to participate in the three-point shootout since Sam Perkins in 1997. In this contest, contestants attempt to make as many three-point field goals as possible from five shooting stations behind the three-point arc in one minute. Players begin shooting from one corner of the court, and move from station to station along the three-point arc until they reach the other corner. Each station has four standard balls, worth one point each, plus one specially colored "money ball", worth two points.

Curry led the first round with 18 points as he advanced to the final round along with Billups and Pierce, who both scored 17 points. Defending champion Cook failed to advance, finishing with 15 points along with Frye and Gallinari. In the second round, Pierce set the tone early by scoring 20 points, and both Billups and Curry were unable to match his score. Pierce, who could only manage to score 8 points in his first participation in 2002, became the first Celtic to win the contest since Larry Bird won it three straight in 1986, 1987 and 1988.

Contestants
Pos.	Player	Team	Height	Weight	First round	Final round
F	Paul Pierce	Boston Celtics	6–7	235	17	20
G	Stephen Curry	Golden State Warriors	6–3	185	18	17
G	Chauncey Billups	Denver Nuggets	6–3	202	17	14
G	Daequan Cook	Miami Heat	6–5	210	15	—
C	Channing Frye	Phoenix Suns	6–11	245	15	—
F	Danilo Gallinari	New York Knicks	6–10	225	15	—

=== Skills Challenge ===
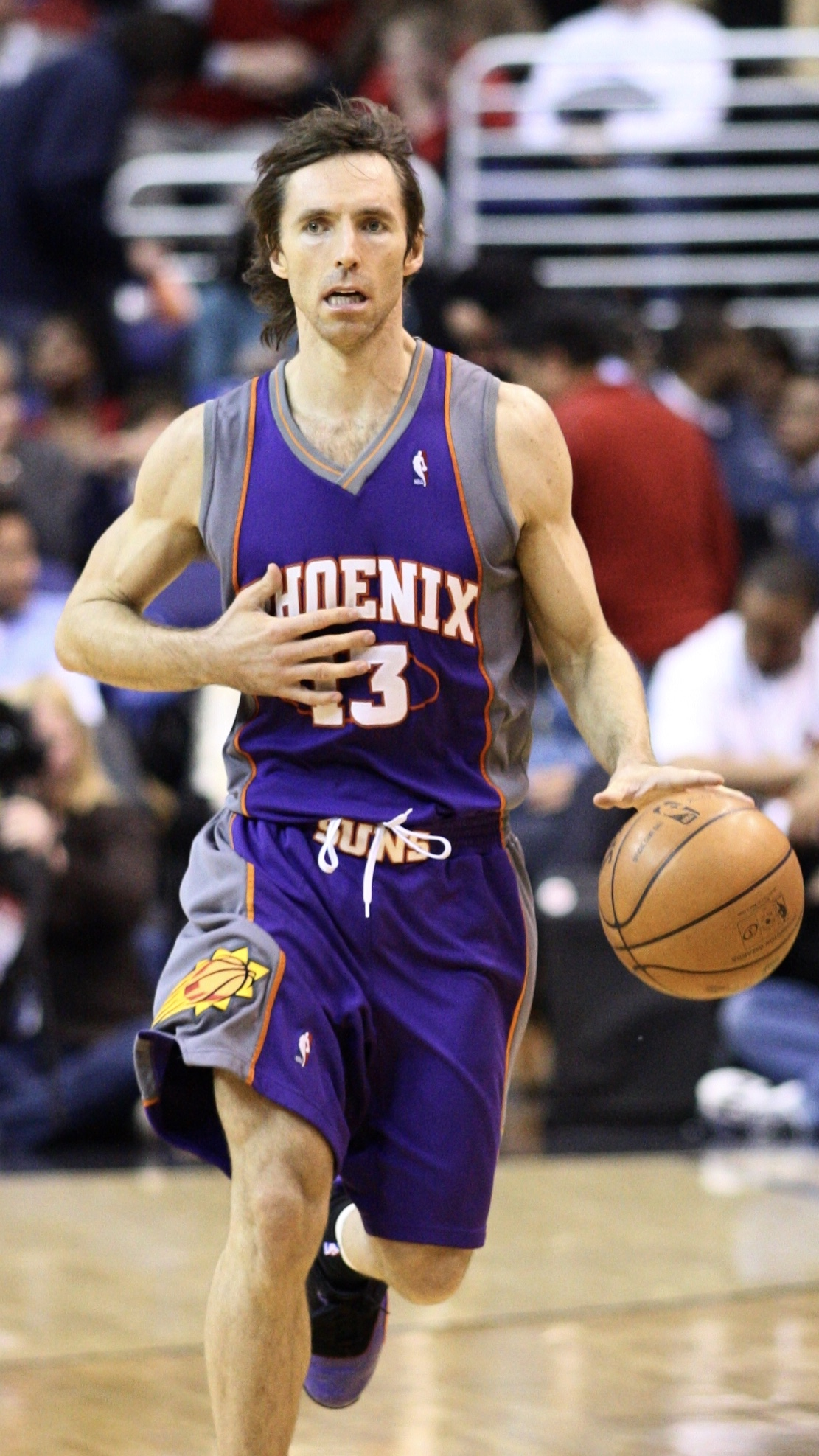
Steve Nash won the 2010 Taco Bell Skills Challenge, becoming the second two-time winner.

The Taco Bell Skills Challenge was contested by four players. Derrick Rose, the defending champion, was supposed to participate in the contest but he suffered an injury before the All-Star Break. He was replaced by Russell Westbrook of the Oklahoma City Thunder. 2008 champion Deron Williams, 2005 champion Steve Nash and rookie Brandon Jennings also competed. In this contest, the contestants have to complete an "obstacle course" consisting of dribbling, passing and shooting stations. The contestant who finishes the course with the fastest time wins the contest. All contestants must comply with basic NBA ball-handling rules while completing the course.

The two former champions, Nash and Williams advanced to the second round with the 35.0 and 34.1 seconds respectively. Jennings missed the cut for the final round with just 35.7 seconds, 0.7 second slower than Nash. In the final round, Nash went quicker than his first round attempt to record 29.9 seconds, while Williams could only record 37.9 seconds. Nash became the second two-time winner of the event, joining Dwyane Wade who won it back-to-back in 2006 and 2007.

Contestants
Pos.	Player	Team	Height	Weight	First round	Final round
G	Steve Nash	Phoenix Suns	6–3	195	35.0	29.9
G	Deron Williams	Utah Jazz	6–3	207	34.1	37.9
G	Brandon Jennings	Milwaukee Bucks	6–1	169	35.7	—
G	Russell Westbrook^{REP}	Oklahoma City Thunder	6–3	187	44.1	—
G	Derrick Rose^{INJ}	Chicago Bulls	6–3	190	—	—

^INJ Derrick Rose was not able to participate due to injury.
^REP Russell Westbrook was named as a replacement for Derrick Rose.

=== Shooting Stars Competition ===
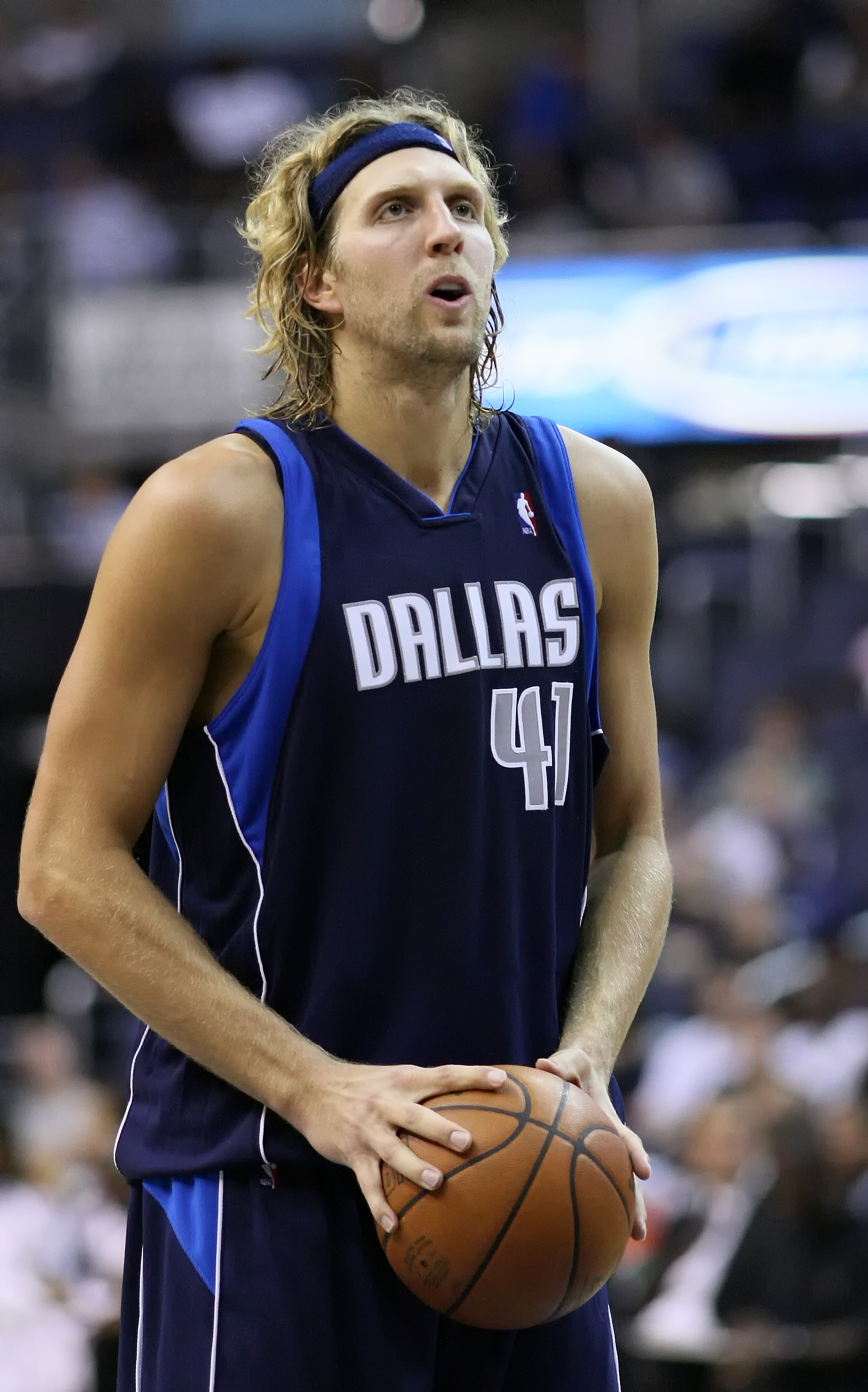
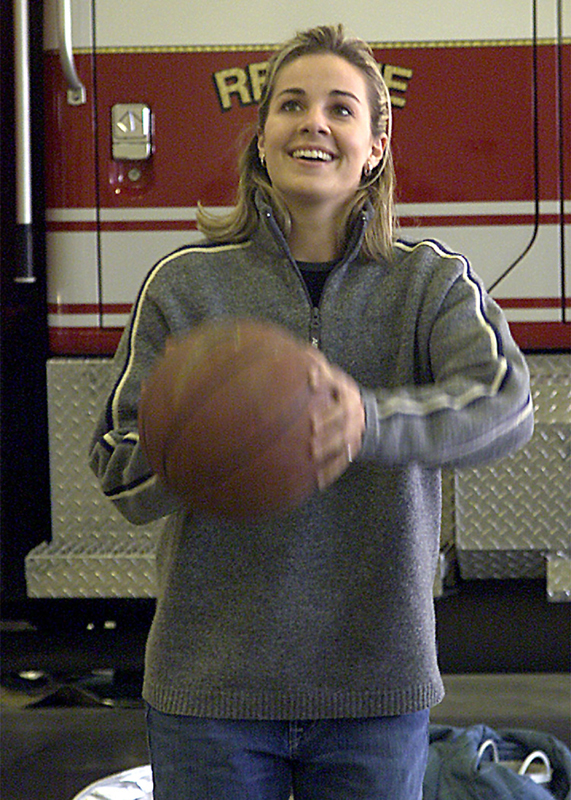
Dirk Nowitzki (left), Becky Hammon (right) and Kenny Smith (not pictured) won the 2010 Haier Shooting Stars Competition.

The Haier Shooting Stars Competition was contested by four teams of three players, with each team representing a city which has both NBA and WNBA teams (or in the case of Sacramento, had one during the 2009 season). Each team consisted of one current NBA player, one current WNBA player, and one NBA legend. In this competition, each team must make six shots from six shooting locations of increasing difficulties. The team who makes all six shots with the fastest time wins the competition. For the first time in the event's history, the TNT and NBA TV analysts participated in the event, as the NBA legend. Defending champion Team Detroit did not return to defend their title. A home team from Texas competed in the competition, representing Dallas, Houston and San Antonio, the three cities in Texas that have NBA franchises. Other participants in the event included Team Atlanta, Team Los Angeles and Team Sacramento.

In the first round, Team Texas and Los Angeles both had the two best times and advanced to the final round. In the final round, Team Texas finished the course in just 34.3 seconds, defeating team Los Angeles who recorded 55.2 seconds. Team Texas only missed two shots in their first five shooting locations before hometown player Dirk Nowitzki scored the half-court shot in the team's sixth attempt. WNBA player Becky Hammon, who won the competition as part of Team San Antonio in 2008, became the second two-time winner, after Bill Laimbeer.

Contestants
City/State	Members	Team	First round	Final round
Texas	Dirk Nowitzki	Dallas Mavericks	1:28	34.3
Texas	Becky Hammon^{1}	San Antonio Silver Stars	1:28	34.3
Texas	Kenny Smith	Houston Rockets (retired)	1:28	34.3
Los Angeles	Pau Gasol	Los Angeles Lakers	1:00	55.2
Los Angeles	Marie Ferdinand-Harris	Los Angeles Sparks	1:00	55.2
Los Angeles	Brent Barry	Los Angeles Clippers (retired)	1:00	55.2
Sacramento	Tyreke Evans	Sacramento Kings	1:46	—
Sacramento	Nicole Powell	Sacramento Monarchs	1:46	—
Sacramento	Chris Webber	Sacramento Kings (retired)	1:46	—
Atlanta	Joe Johnson	Atlanta Hawks	1:47	—
Atlanta	Angel McCoughtry	Atlanta Dream	1:47	—
Atlanta	Steve Smith	Atlanta Hawks (retired)	1:47	—

^1 Becky Hammon is a U.S. citizen by birth. She became a naturalized citizen of Russia in 2007 and has represented Russia in international competitions.

=== H–O–R–S–E Competition ===
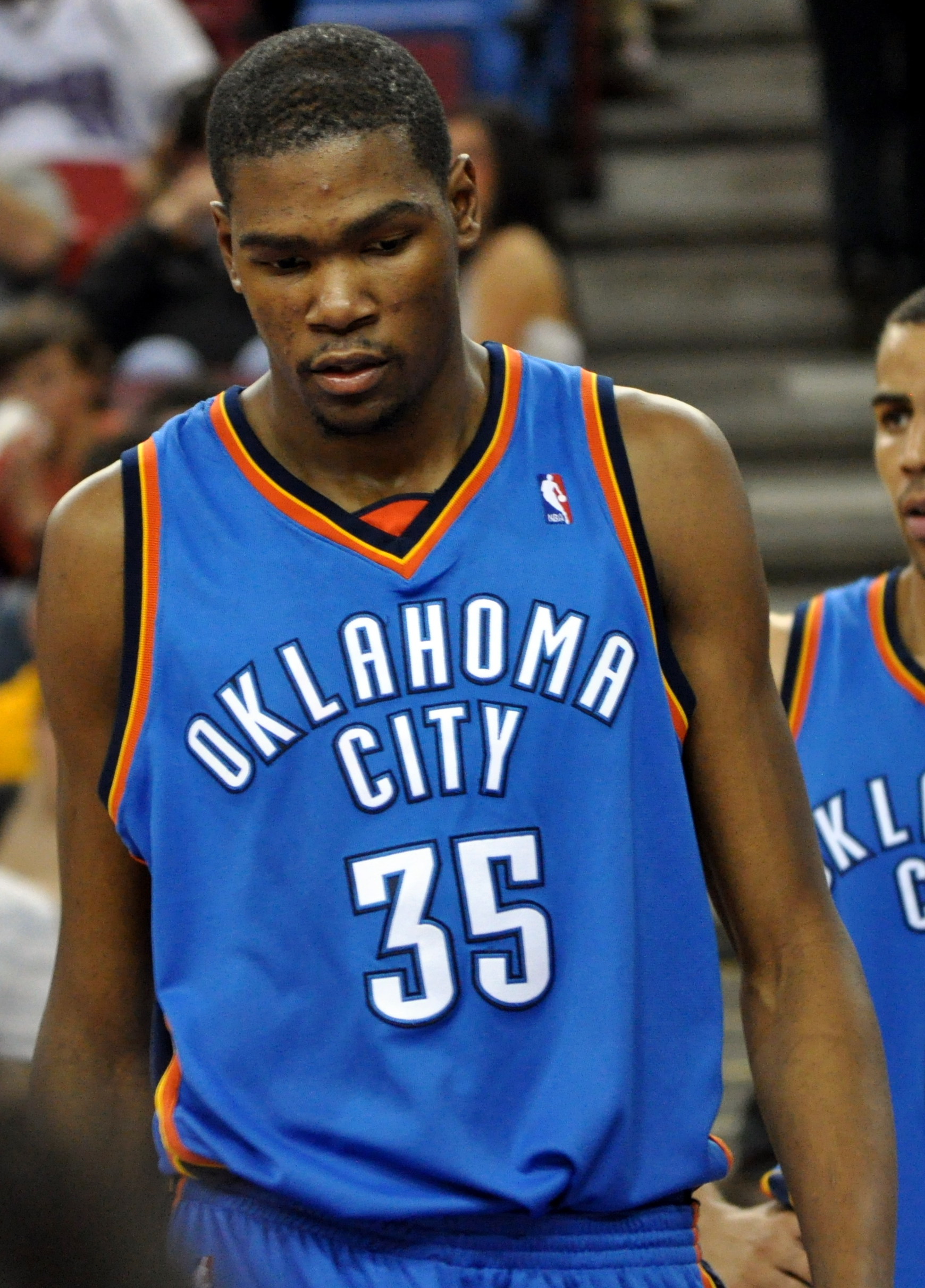
Kevin Durant repeated as champion in the 2010 H–O–R–S–E Competition.

A H–O–R–S–E Competition, which was contested for the first time last year as an exhibition event before the All-Star Saturday Night, is now part of the All-Star Saturday Night events. The objective of this competition is to accrue as few of the five letters as possible. Players are given a "letter" every time they fail to duplicate a shot of another player. Each player is given 24 seconds to make or duplicate a shot—dunking is prohibited. Each player who fails to duplicate five shots is eliminated from the competition. An NBA referee is assigned to rule whether the shot is performed properly. Defending champion Kevin Durant returned to defend his title, competing against Rajon Rondo and rookie Omri Casspi. All players started slow in the contest early on after failing to make most shots. Casspi was soon eliminated when he accumulated the five letters. Due to time constraint, the competition turned into a three-point contest. Durant made most of his shots, eliminating Rondo who missed two three-pointers.

Contestants
Pos.	Player	Team	Height	Weight	Results
F	Kevin Durant	Oklahoma City Thunder	6–9	230	H-O-R
G	Rajon Rondo	Boston Celtics	6–1	171	H-O-R-S-E
F	Omri Casspi	Sacramento Kings	6–9	225	H-O-R-S-E

=== Celebrity Game ===
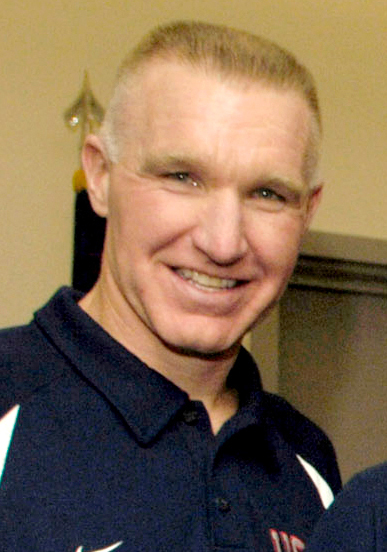
Five-time All-Star Chris Mullin participated in the Celebrity Game.

The NBA All-Star Celebrity Game was played on Friday, February 12 at the Dallas Convention Center. A total of 20 celebrities took part in the game, including several former basketball players. Basketball Hall of Famer Magic Johnson and five-time NBA All-Star Alonzo Mourning, served as coaches for the celebrity teams. Three former NBA players, Robert Horry, Rick Fox and Chris Mullin, along with Hall of Famer Nancy Lieberman and Dallas Mavericks owner Mark Cuban, participated in the game. The West team won 41–37 over the East. "Special K" Daley, one of the four Harlem Globetrotters player that participated in the game, scored game-high 18 points for the West. Actor Michael Rapaport, who scored 4 points, was named as the Celebrity Game MVP for his defense on football player Terrell Owens, the MVP of the last two Celebrity Games. Owens, who played both college basketball and football in Chattanooga, led the East with 10 points. The Globetrotters, joined by "Curly" Neal and "Bucket" Blakes, entertained the crowd during the timeouts with their signature ball-handling tricks.

East
Player	Background
Doctor Oz	Doctor/TV host
Chris Tucker	Actor/comedian
Joel Moore	Actor
Pitbull	Musician
Terrell Owens	Football player
"Flight Time" Lang	Harlem Globetrotters
"Big Easy" Lofton	Harlem Globetrotters
Angel McCoughtry	WNBA player
Nancy Lieberman	Basketball Hall of Famer
Rick Fox	NBA player
Head coach: Alonzo Mourning
Assistant coach: Mario Lopez (Actor)

West
Player	Background
Anthony Kim	Golfer
Terrence J	TV host
Mark Cuban	Dallas Mavericks owner
Common	Actor/musician
Michael Rapaport	Actor
"Scooter" Christensen	Harlem Globetrotters
"Special K" Daley	Harlem Globetrotters
Becky Hammon	WNBA player
Chris Mullin	Basketball Hall of Famer
Robert Horry	NBA player
Head coach: Magic Johnson
Assistant coach: Drake (Musician)

== D-League All-Star ==
=== D-League All-Star Game ===
Twenty of the NBA Development League's top players were selected to the D-League All-Star Game rosters by a combination of fan balloting on the official D-League website and voting by the 16 head coaches of D-League teams. Players who have been selected by coaches and fans must be on an active roster of a D-League team. Iowa Energy head coach Nick Nurse and Rio Grande Valley Vipers head coach Chris Finch were selected as the coach for the Red Team and the Blue Team respectively. Both coaches earned the honor by securing the best records in the D-League through January 26.

Eastern Conference
Pos.	Player	Team
C	Alexis Ajinça^{INJ}	Maine Red Claws
F	Morris Almond	Springfield Armor
F	Alade Aminu	Erie BayHawks
C	Earl Barron	Iowa Energy
F	Romel Beck^{REP}	Dakota Wizards
F	Trey Gilder	Maine Red Claws
F	Ron Howard	Fort Wayne Mad Ants
F	Rob Kurz	Fort Wayne Mad Ants
G/F	Cartier Martin	Iowa Energy
G	Curtis Stinson	Iowa Energy
F	Reggie Williams	Sioux Falls Skyforce
Head coach: Nick Nurse (Iowa Energy)

Western Conference
Pos.	Player	Team
G	Antonio Anderson^{INJ}	Rio Grande Valley Vipers
C	Brian Butch^{REP}	Bakersfield Jam
G	Joe Crawford^{REP}	Los Angeles D-Fenders
C	Joey Dorsey^{DNP}	Rio Grande Valley Vipers
G	Desmon Farmer^{REP}	Reno Bighorns
G	Sundiata Gaines^{DNP}	Idaho Stampede
G	Alonzo Gee	Austin Toros
F	Mike Harris	Rio Grande Valley Vipers
G	Dontell Jefferson^{INJ}	Utah Flash
G	Curtis Jerrells^{REP}	Austin Toros
F	Dwayne Jones	Austin Toros
F	Carlos Powell	Albuquerque Thunderbirds
G	Mustafa Shakur	Tulsa 66ers
F	Diamon Simpson^{REP}	Los Angeles D-Fenders
F	Anthony Tolliver^{DNP}	Idaho Stampede
Head coach: Chris Finch (Rio Grande Valley Vipers)

^INJ Alexis Ajinca, Dontell Jefferson and Antonio Anderson did not participate due to injury.
^DNP Joey Dorsey did not participate due to a recall by the Houston Rockets, while Sundiata Gaines and Anthony Tolliver did not participate due to call-ups to the Utah Jazz and Golden State Warriors respectively.
^REP Romel Beck, Brian Butch, Joe Crawford, Desmon Farmer, Curtis Jerrells and Diamon Simpson was named as replacements for the unavailable players.

NBA TV

February 13
3:00 p.m. ET

Recap
Boxscore

Eastern Conference 81, Western Conference 98
Scoring by half: 41–48, 40–50
Pts: Earl Barron 20; Rebs: Rob Kurz 10; Asts: Curtis Stinson 11	Pts: Brian Butch 18; Rebs: Brian Butch 13; Asts: Curtis Jerrells 6

Dallas Convention Center, Dallas
Attendance: 3500
Referees:
- #12 Scott Bolnick
- #14 Nick Buchert
- #52 James Williams

In the fourth annual D-League All-Star Game, the Western Conference team defeated the Eastern Conference Team 98–81. Bakersfield Jam center Brian Butch, who scored 18 points and grabbed 13 rebounds, was named as the MVP of the game. Iowa Energy center Earl Barron scored the game-high 20 points, while Curtis Stinson recorded the game-high 11 assists for the East.

=== D-League Dream Factory Friday Night ===
==== Slam Dunk Contest ====
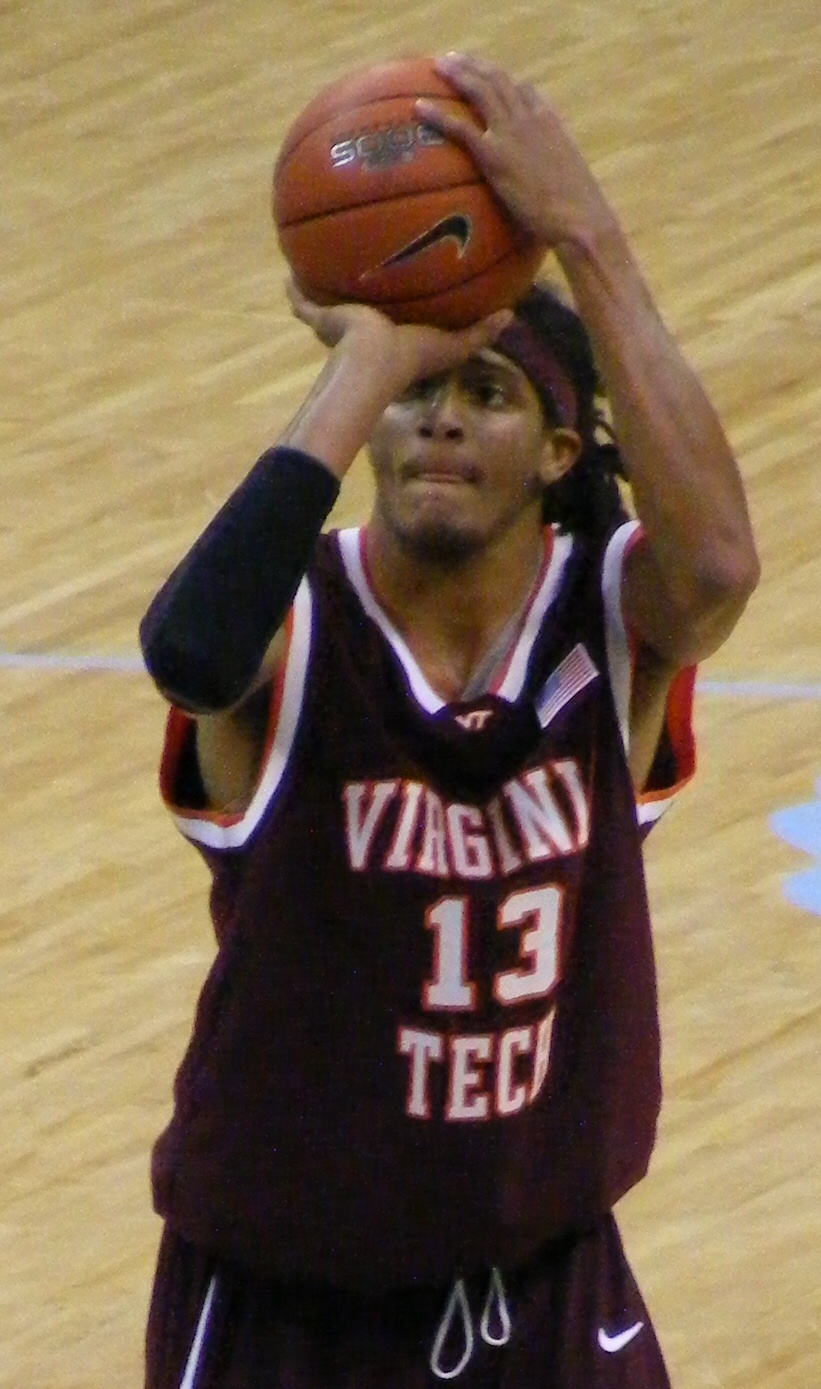
Deron Washington participated in the D-League Slam Dunk Contest.

Dar Tucker won the third annual D-League Slam Dunk Contest, beating Alonzo Gee in the final round. Tucker scored four 50-point dunk, finishing with perfect score in both the first and final round. In his final dunk, Tucker jumped over his teammate Brian Butch, who is seven feet tall.

Contestants
Pos.	Player	Team	Height	Weight
G	Dar Tucker	Los Angeles D-Fenders	6–4	205
G/F	Anthony Danridge	Albuquerque Thunderbirds	6–5	215
G	Alonzo Gee^{REP}	Austin Toros	6–6	220
F	Trey Gilder^{REP}	Maine Red Claws	6–9	185
F	Bill Walker^{DNP}	Maine Red Claws	6–5	220
F	Deron Washington^{INJ}	Tulsa 66ers	6–8	215

^INJ Deron Washington did not participate due to injury.
^DNP Bill Walker did not participate due to a recall by the Boston Celtics.
^REP Alonzo Gee and Trey Gilder was named as replacements for the unavailable players.

==== Three-Point Shootout ====
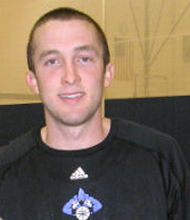
Blake Ahearn participated in the D-League Three-Point Shootout.

Andre Ingram won the third annual D-League Three-Point Shootout, beating defending champion Blake Ahearn in the final round by a score of 39–37. Ingram advanced to the finals having scored 18 points, while Ahearn scored 20 points in the first round. Morris Almond and Rob Kurz were eliminated in the first round.

Contestants
Pos.	Player	Team	Height	Weight
G	Andre Ingram	Utah Flash	6–3	190
G	Blake Ahearn	Bakersfield Jam	6–2	190
G	Morris Almond	Springfield Armor	6–5	210
F	Rob Kurz	Fort Wayne Mad Ants	6–9	230

==== Shooting Stars Competition ====
The Haier Shooting Stars Competition was held for the first time in the D-League Dream Factory Friday Night events. A team of Pat Carroll, Trey Gilder and Carlos Powell won the inaugural competition by defeating of a team of Brian Butch, Desmon Farmer and Donell Taylor in the final round. Carroll, Gilder and Powell finished the course with a time of 15.6 seconds, with Powell made a half-court shot on their first attempt.

Contestants
Pos.	Player	Team	Height	Weight
G	Pat Carroll	Iowa Energy	6–5	190
F	Trey Gilder	Maine Red Claws	6–9	185
F	Carlos Powell	Albuquerque Thunderbirds	6–7	225
F	Romel Beck	Dakota Wizards	6–8	195
F	Brian Butch	Bakersfield Jam	6–11	240
F	Desmon Farmer	Reno Bighorns	6–5	210
F	Mike Harris	Rio Grande Valley Vipers	6–6	235
G	Donell Taylor^{REP}	Idaho Stampede	6–5	215
G	Curtis Jerrells	Austin Toros	6–1	195
G	Mustafa Shakur	Tulsa 66ers	6–3	190
F	Diamon Simpson	Los Angeles D-Fenders	6–7	230
F	Reggie Williams	Sioux Falls Skyforce	6–6	210
G	Dontell Jefferson^{INJ}	Utah Flash	6–5	190

^INJ Dontell Jefferson did not participate due to injury.
^REP Donell Taylor was named as replacements for Dontell Jefferson.
