= Nate Robinson =

American basketball player (born 1984)

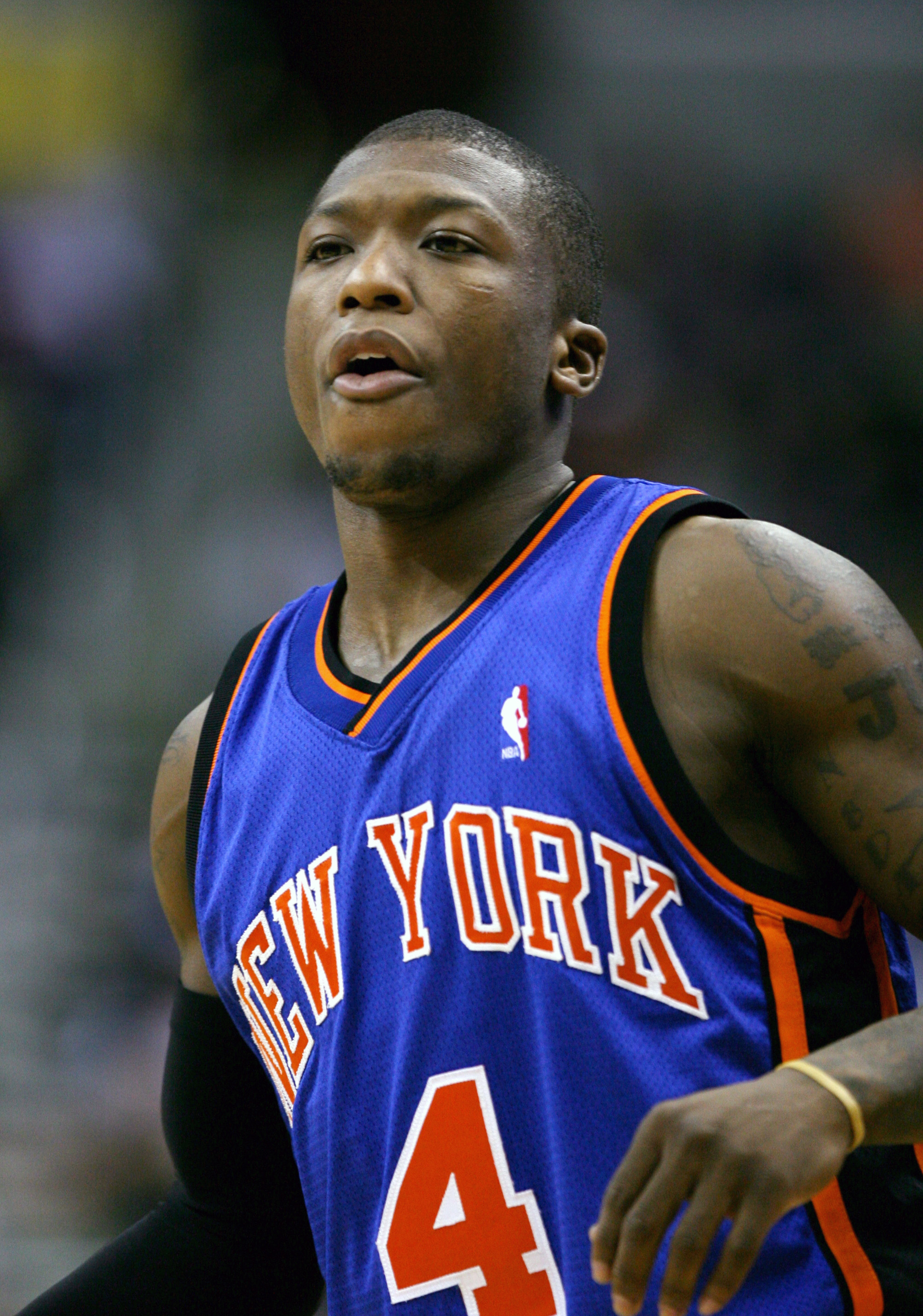
- Robinson with the New York Knicks in 2007

Personal information
- Born: May 31, 1984 (age 42) Seattle, Washington, U.S.
- Listed height: 5 ft 9 in (1.75 m)
- Listed weight: 180 lb (82 kg)

Career information
- High school: Rainier Beach (Seattle, Washington); James Logan (Union City, California)
- College: Washington (2002–2005)
- NBA draft: 2005: 1st round, 21st overall pick
- Drafted by: Phoenix Suns
- Playing career: 2005–2017
- Position: Point guard
- Number: 4, 2, 3, 10, 5, 8

Career history
- 2005–2010: New York Knicks
- 2010–2011: Boston Celtics
- 2011: Oklahoma City Thunder
- 2012: Golden State Warriors
- 2012–2013: Chicago Bulls
- 2013–2015: Denver Nuggets
- 2015: Los Angeles Clippers
- 2015: New Orleans Pelicans
- 2016: Hapoel Tel Aviv
- 2017: Delaware 87ers
- 2017: Guaros de Lara

Career highlights
- 3× NBA Slam Dunk Contest champion (2006, 2009, 2010); Venezuelan League champion (2017); Venezuelan League Grand Final MVP (2017); Third-team All-American – AP, NABC (2005); Frances Pomeroy Naismith Award (2005); 2× First-team All-Pac-10 (2004, 2005); Pac-10 All-Freshman Team (2003)

Career NBA statistics
- Points: 6,807 (11.0 ppg)
- Rebounds: 1,446 (2.3 rpg)
- Assists: 1,826 (3.0 apg)
- Stats at NBA.com
- Stats at Basketball Reference

Nathaniel Cornelius Robinson (born May 31, 1984) is an American former professional basketball player. Robinson played college basketball for the Washington Huskies and was the 21st overall pick of the 2005 NBA draft. The 5-foot-9-inch (1.75 m) point guard played 11 seasons in the National Basketball Association (NBA) for the New York Knicks, Boston Celtics, Oklahoma City Thunder, Golden State Warriors, Chicago Bulls, Denver Nuggets, Los Angeles Clippers, and New Orleans Pelicans. Robinson became the NBA's first three-time slam dunk champion in 2010.

== Early life ==
Robinson was born on May 31, 1984, in Seattle, Washington. Growing up in the South Seattle area, Robinson spent his first three years of high school at Rainier Beach High School before moving to Union City, California, where he played for James Logan High School in 2000–01. He then returned to Rainier Beach for his senior season in 2001–02. At Rainier Beach, Robinson excelled in basketball, football and track. He led his basketball team to a 28–1 record and won the AAA state championship as a senior with teammates Terrence Williams and twins, Rodrick and Lodrick Stewart. He averaged 17.9 points, seven rebounds, seven assists and three steals per game in 2001–02, and was named the AAA State player of the year in Washington. Rainier Beach also received a No. 7 national ranking from USA Today.

On September 10, 2010, Rainier Beach retired Robinson's No. 2 jersey.

== College career ==
Robinson was originally enrolled at Washington on a football scholarship, but decided to concentrate on basketball beginning with his sophomore year. He played all 13 football games in 2002 and started the final six games as a cornerback on the Husky football squad, including the Sun Bowl. He intercepted two passes and made 34 tackles.

In his freshman basketball season at Washington in 2002–03, Robinson was named to the CollegeInsider.com's 20-player national All-Freshmen Team, as well as earning All-Pac-10 Freshman Team honors. He led the team in scoring average with 13.0 points per game, a figure that ranked 17th among Pac-10 players; also his 300 points tied for fourth among all-time UW freshmen.

In his sophomore season, Robinson was named to the All-Pac-10 first team after he led the team and ranked 13th among Pac-10 scorers with 13.2 points per game.

In his junior season, Robinson was named to the NABC All-NCAA District 14 first team, NABC All-America third team, Pac-10 All-Tournament team and All-Pac-10 first team after leading Washington to the Sweet Sixteen of the NCAA Tournament

In April 2005, Robinson declared for the NBA draft, forgoing his final year of college eligibility.

== Professional career ==
=== New York Knicks (2005–2010) ===
Robinson was selected with the 21st overall pick by the Phoenix Suns in the 2005 NBA draft. He was later traded to the New York Knicks on draft night along with Quentin Richardson in exchange for Kurt Thomas and the draft rights to Dijon Thompson.

Robinson played in 72 games his rookie year, starting 26 of them, while averaging 9.3 points and 2.0 assists per game. He had a major breakout performance against the Philadelphia 76ers at Madison Square Garden where he scored 17 points and grabbed 6 rebounds. Of his 17 points, three came on a game-winning three-pointer at the overtime buzzer. During the All-Star weekend, Robinson won the 2006 Sprite Rising Stars Slam Dunk Contest, edging Andre Iguodala 141–140 in overtime, although he took 14 attempts to make his final dunk. In his most memorable dunk of the night, he jumped over 1986 champion Spud Webb, and received a perfect 50-point score for the dunk.

During the 2005–06 season, Robinson was reportedly involved in physical altercations between teammates Jerome James and Malik Rose in separate incidents. He was at one point considered by Knicks' coach Larry Brown to be demoted to the NBA Development League. He was instead placed on the Inactive List for 10 games between February 24 and March 11.

On November 11, 2006, Robinson blocked the 7'6" Yao Ming during the Knicks' 97–90 loss to the Houston Rockets. It became one of his career highlights owing to the unlikeliness of the event and Robinson's own athletic abilities.

On December 16, 2006, Robinson was one of the primary participants in the brawl between the Denver Nuggets and the Knicks. His fight with Nuggets guard J. R. Smith landed in the seats, and he was suspended for 10 games as a result.

Robinson competed in the 2007 Slam Dunk Contest to defend his 2006 title, and came in second place after Gerald Green. In the second round, Green's Boston Celtics teammate Paul Pierce brought out a cardboard cut-out of Robinson to dunk over, but Robinson came out and stood in its place instead, and Green jumped over him to complete the dunk.

In the 2007–08 season, Robinson averaged 12.7 points per game and was the team's leading scorer in 10 games. On March 8, 2008, he scored a career-high 45 points in a 114–120 overtime loss to the Portland Trail Blazers.

On February 14, 2009, Robinson won the 2009 Sprite Slam Dunk Competition. During the first round he completed two dunks, the second of which included jumping off Knicks teammate Wilson Chandler, who was on the floor. He finished second in the first round with a score of 87. After the first round, he went into the locker room and changed into a green Knicks jersey with green shorts and green shoes representing Kryptonite (which he called "KryptoNATE"), countering competitor Dwight Howard's Superman theme. In the final round, Robinson, who is only 5 feet 9, jumped over Dwight Howard (6 feet 11 inches) for the slam. Robinson went on to win his second Slam Dunk title with 52% of the fan vote.

Robinson had his best season in 2008–2009, averaging 17.2 points per game, 4.1 assists per game, and almost 30 minutes per game. On February 23, 2009, Robinson scored 41 points and also had 8 rebounds.

On August 12, 2009, Robinson reported on his Twitter page that he would change his number from number 4 to number 2 for the 2009–10 season. On September 25, 2009, Robinson re-signed with the New York Knicks to a one-year deal.

After a series of disagreements, Mike D'Antoni removed Robinson from the Knicks' rotation for 14 games beginning on December 1, 2009. Robinson's agent, Aaron Goodwin, urged the Knicks to deal his client, or perhaps work out a buy-out with the team. After remaining on the bench for nearly a month, Robinson made his return on January 1, 2010, against the Atlanta Hawks, and scored 41 points off the bench in the Knicks' overtime victory. He scored 21 of the Knicks' final 25 points, which included outscoring the Hawks by himself in overtime.

On February 13, 2010, Robinson won the 2010 Sprite Slam Dunk Contest, becoming the first three-time Slam Dunk champion.

=== Boston Celtics (2010–2011) ===
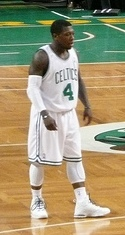
Robinson played parts of two seasons (February 2010 to February 2011) with the Boston Celtics.

On February 18, 2010, Robinson was traded to the Boston Celtics along with Marcus Landry in exchange for Eddie House, Bill Walker, and J. R. Giddens. Robinson played in 26 games with the Celtics averaging 6.5 points per game in 14.7 minutes per game. He was the primary backup to Rajon Rondo.

Despite his limited playing time, Robinson made key contributions during the Celtics' playoff run that season. In the series clinching Game 6 of the Eastern Conference Finals against the Orlando Magic, he scored 13 points in just 13 minutes while Rondo was tending to an injury. The Celtics bench, namely Robinson and Glen Davis, who called themselves "Shrek and Donkey", led a 13–2 run in the fourth quarter of their NBA Finals Game 4 victory to tie the series at two games each. The Celtics ultimately lost the series in seven games.

On July 16, 2010, Robinson re–signed with Boston on a two-year deal. With Rondo playing on limited minutes for the first two months of the season due to an ankle injury, Robinson received extended playing time and started 11 games for the Celtics between November and December. Six of the games Robinson started were part of a 14–game win streak for the Celtics. By January 2011, both Rondo and Delonte West were healthy, and Robinson was pushed to third on the point guard depth chart.

=== Oklahoma City Thunder (2011) ===
On February 24, 2011, Robinson was traded, along with Kendrick Perkins, to the Oklahoma City Thunder in exchange for Jeff Green and Nenad Krstić. He appeared in a second consecutive Conference Finals that year, but had fallen out of the Thunder's rotation by that point.

On December 24, 2011, just prior to the start of the lockout–shortened 2011–12 season, the Thunder waived Robinson.

=== Golden State Warriors (2012) ===
On January 4, 2012, Robinson signed with the Golden State Warriors. On January 10, 2012, with the absence of Stephen Curry, Robinson led the Warriors with 24 points in a 111–106 overtime victory over the Miami Heat. In the 2011–2012 season he averaged 11.2 points, 4.5 assists and 2 rebounds in 51 games played.

=== Chicago Bulls (2012–2013) ===
On July 31, 2012, Robinson signed a one-year contract with the Chicago Bulls. Due to Derrick Rose's injury, Robinson was given extensive playing time and started 23 games behind Kirk Hinrich. Robinson was named as the Eastern Conference Player of the Week for the first week of February, after averaging 17.8 points, 6.8 assists, and 2.5 steals on 52.9 percent from the three-point line in a 4-game span. During a 19-game stretch from March 8 to April 14, Robinson averaged 18.6 points and 5.1 assists, which included a win over the defending champion Heat on March 27 to end Miami's 27-game winning streak. The Bulls finished 45–37, good for the fifth seed in the East.

Up 2–1 in their first round series against the Brooklyn Nets, the Bulls faced a 109–95 deficit in game 4 with less than three minutes left in regulation. Robinson scored 12 unanswered points to bring the Bulls back and eventually win the game in triple overtime. He finished the game with 34 points, including 23 points in the 4th quarter, just one point shy of Michael Jordan's franchise playoff record. The Nets won the next two games setting up a decisive game 7 in Brooklyn that the Bulls won, which was their first road game 7 victory in franchise history.

Matched with the Miami Heat in the semifinals, Robinson scored 27 points and nine assists in game 1 to stun the defending champions and take a 1–0 series lead. He joined Michael Jordan, Scottie Pippen, and Derrick Rose as the only Bulls to score at least 25 points and nine assists in a playoff game. The Bulls lost the next four as Miami went on to repeat as NBA Champions. Steve Kerr, then a television analyst, said after Robinson's performance in the 2013 NBA Playoffs, "they might have to put a statue of this guy outside the building, right next to Michael." Kevin Craft of The Atlantic called Robinson the breakout star of the playoffs.

=== Denver Nuggets (2013–2015) ===
On July 26, 2013, Robinson signed a multi-year deal with the Denver Nuggets. He announced that he would wear number 10 to honor soccer player Lionel Messi; his preferred number 2 was already retired for Alex English.

On June 23, 2014, Robinson exercised the player option on his contract. On January 13, 2015, Robinson was traded to the Boston Celtics in exchange for Jameer Nelson Two days later, he was waived by the Celtics before appearing in a game for them.

=== Los Angeles Clippers (2015) ===
On March 7, 2015, Robinson signed a 10-day contract with the Los Angeles Clippers. On March 17, he signed a second 10-day contract with the Clippers. Due to injury, he was not retained by the Clippers following the expiration of his second 10-day contract.

=== New Orleans Pelicans (2015) ===
On October 16, 2015, Robinson signed a one-year deal with the New Orleans Pelicans. On October 29, he was waived by the Pelicans after appearing in the team's first two games of the regular season.

=== Hapoel Tel Aviv (2016) ===
On March 17, 2016, Robinson signed with Hapoel Tel Aviv of the Israeli Basketball Premier League. On May 19, he scored a season-high 46 points in a playoff game against Hapoel Jerusalem. In 14 games for Tel Aviv, he averaged 16.2 points, 1.6 rebounds, 2.9 assists and 1.8 steals per game.

=== Delaware 87ers (2017) ===
On February 8, 2017, Robinson was acquired by the Delaware 87ers of the NBA Development League. On February 14, he made his debut in a 123–101 win over the Maine Red Claws, recording three points, three assists and three steals in 18 minutes off the bench.

=== Guaros de Lara (2017) ===
On April 3, 2017, Robinson signed with Guaros de Lara of the Venezuelan Liga Profesional de Baloncesto (LPB). In July, Robinson won the 2017 LPB championship with Guaros. Robinson was named the LPB Grand Final MVP.

On July 31, 2018, Robinson signed with Homenetmen Beirut of the Lebanese Basketball League. He was waived by the club in September 2018 due to an injury he suffered while playing in the BIG3 during the summer.

== NBA career statistics ==
Legend
GP	Games played	GS	Games started	MPG	Minutes per game
FG%	Field goal percentage	3P%	3-point field goal percentage	FT%	Free throw percentage
RPG	Rebounds per game	APG	Assists per game	SPG	Steals per game
BPG	Blocks per game	PPG	Points per game	**Bold**	Career high
*	Led the league

=== Regular season ===
Year	Team	GP	GS	MPG	FG%	3P%	FT%	RPG	APG	SPG	BPG	PPG
2005–06	New York	72	**26**	21.4	.407	.397	.752	2.3	2.0	.8	.0	9.3
2006–07	New York	64	5	21.2	.434	.390	.777	2.4	1.4	.8	.1	10.1
2007–08	New York	72	17	26.2	.423	.332	.786	3.1	2.9	.8	.0	12.7
2008–09	New York	74	11	**29.9**	.437	.325	**.841**	**3.9**	4.1	**1.3**	.1	**17.2**
2009–10	New York	30	2	24.4	**.452**	.375	.778	2.4	3.7	.9	**.2**	13.2
2009–10	Boston	26	0	14.7	.401	**.414**	.615	1.5	2.0	.8	.0	6.5
2010–11	Boston	55	11	17.9	.404	.328	.825	1.6	1.9	.5	.1	7.1
2010–11	Oklahoma City	4	0	7.5	.267	.250	.750	.3	1.5	.0	.0	3.3
2011–12	Golden State	51	9	23.4	.424	.365	.832	2.0	**4.5**	1.2	.0	11.2
2012–13	Chicago	**82***	23	25.4	.433	.405	.799	2.2	4.4	1.0	.1	13.1
2013–14	Denver	44	1	19.7	.428	.377	.835	1.8	2.5	.8	.1	10.4
2014–15	Denver	33	1	14.1	.348	.261	.650	1.2	2.3	.4	.1	5.8
2014–15	L.A. Clippers	9	0	14.0	.333	.350	.833	1.2	2.2	.7	.0	5.1
2015–16	New Orleans	2	1	11.5	.000	.000	.000	.0	2.0	.5	.0	.0
Career		618	107	22.5	.423	.360	.796	2.3	3.0	.9	.1	11.0

=== Playoffs ===
Year	Team	GP	GS	MPG	FG%	3P%	FT%	RPG	APG	SPG	BPG	PPG
2010	Boston	**17**	0	7.5	.375	.333	.800	.8	1.1	.4	.1	4.2
2011	Oklahoma City	3	0	4.0	.286	.333	**1.000**	.0	.3	.0	.0	2.7
2013	Chicago	12	**8**	**33.7**	**.436**	**.338**	.756	**2.7**	**4.4**	**1.0**	**.2**	**16.3**
Career		32	8	17.0	.415	.337	.776	1.4	2.3	.6	.1	8.6

== Personal life ==
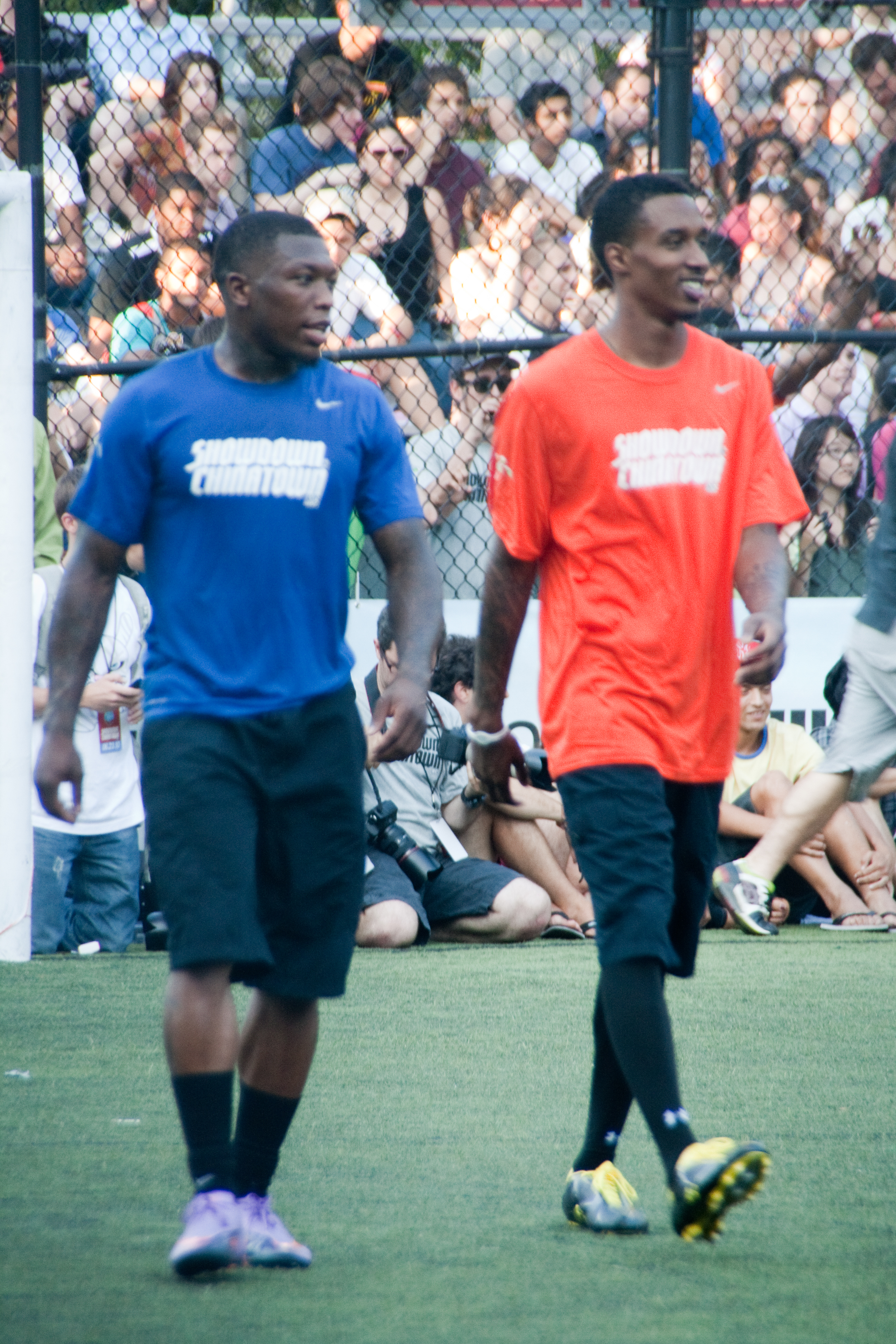
Robinson (left) and Brandon Jennings in a charity soccer match in 2010

Robinson's father, Jacque Robinson, played American football for the Huskies and earned MVP honors in both the 1982 Rose Bowl and 1985 Orange Bowl. Robinson's father was drafted by the Buffalo Bills in 1987 and played one season with the Philadelphia Eagles before his NFL career ended. His mother operates a beauty salon in Seattle. He is also the cousin of point guard Tony Wroten. Robinson's great-great-grandfather on his maternal side was Filipino.

Robinson has three children with his high school sweetheart.

In 2022, Robinson revealed that he had been battling renal disease. In April 2024, his renal failure had advanced to the point where he did not have long to live without a new kidney replacing his failing one. In February 2025, Robinson received a kidney transplant.

== Outside the court ==
In 2014, Robinson released a book entitled Heart over Height.

In 2014, Robinson opened a chicken and waffles restaurant in Rainier Beach, Seattle, the neighborhood where he grew up and went to high school.

In June 2016, Robinson played with the Seattle Seahawks practice squad.

In 2018, Robinson played the role of Boots in the basketball comedy film Uncle Drew.

In July 2020, Robinson announced he would be venturing into boxing for a professional debut, facing professional boxer and YouTuber Jake Paul as part of the undercard for the Mike Tyson vs. Roy Jones Jr. exhibition match. The event was initially scheduled for September 12 at the Dignity Health Sports Park in Carson, California; however, in August, Tyson revealed the event had been pushed back to November 28 in order to maximize revenue. Robinson lost to Paul by second-round knockout. The same year, Adult streaming website Camsoda extended an offer to Robinson to compete in Full Metal Dojo's Fight Circus and get paid US$200,000 for every fighter he faces in one night.

== Professional boxing record ==
1 fight	0 wins	1 loss
By knockout	0	1

No.	Result	Record	Opponent	Type	Round, time	Date	Location	Notes
1	Loss	0–1	Jake Paul	KO	2 (6), 1:24	Nov 28, 2020	Staples Center, Los Angeles, California, U.S.	

== See also ==
- List of shortest players in NBA history
- List of people banned or suspended by the NBA
