= Jhornan Zamora =

Venezuelan-Spanish basketball player

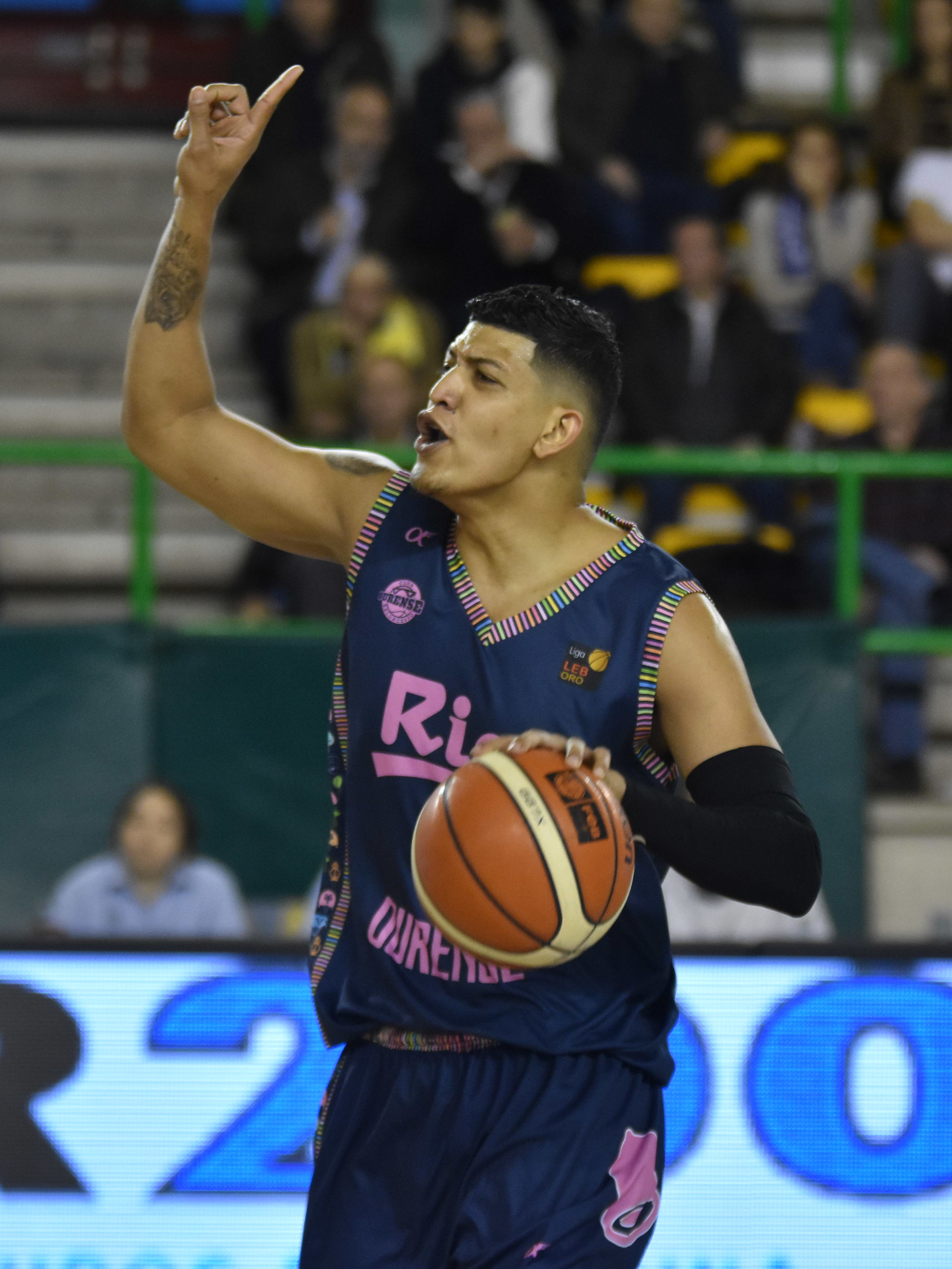
- Zamora in 2019

No. 7 – Trotamundos de Carabobo
- Position: Shooting guard
- League: Superliga Profesional de Baloncesto

Personal information
- Born: 30 January 1989 (age 37) Caracas, Venezuela
- Listed height: 6 ft 5 in (1.96 m)

Career information
- Playing career: 2008–present

Career history
- 2008–2009: CB Valladolid
- 2009–2011: CB Axarquía
- 2009–2010: Clinicas Rincon
- 2010–2011: Clinicas Rincon
- 2012–2013: Palencia
- 2013–2015: Trotamundos de Carabobo
- 2015–2016: Ourense
- 2016–2017: Palencia
- 2017: Puerto Montt
- 2017–2019: Ourense
- 2019–2021: ALM Évreux
- 2021–2022: Trotamundos de Carabobo
- 2022–2023: Titanes de Barranquilla
- 2023–present: Trotamundos de Carabobo
- 2024: El Calor de Cancún

Career highlights
- 2× Venezuelan SuperLiga champion (2021-I, 2022); 2× Venezuelan SuperLiga Finals MVP (2021-I, 2022)
Medals
Men's basketball
Representing Venezuela
South American Basketball Championship
Gold medal – first place	2014 Isla Mangarita
Silver medal – second place	2012 Resistencia

Jhornan José Zamora Mota (born 30 January 1989) is a Venezuelan-Spanish professional basketball player for Trotamundos de Carabobo of the Superliga Profesional de Baloncesto (SPB), and the Venezuelan national team. He plays as a shooting guard.

He also holds Spanish citizenship as he previously played for various Spanish clubs including CB Valladolid, CB Axarquía, Clinicas Rincon, Palencia and Club Ourense Baloncesto. Jhornan was part of the Venezuelan squad during the 2019 FIBA Basketball World Cup, where the team ended up at 14th position.

== Club career ==
He started his career as a youngster for CB Valladolid in 2004 and played for the side until 2009. On 19 September 2015, he joined the Spanish Club Ourense Baloncesto for one-year contract and later renewed the contract with it in 2017–19 season. In July 2019, he left the Club Ourense and signed with French club ALM Évreux Basket.

In November 2022, Zamora joined the Titanes de Barranquilla in Colombia.
