= Gladiadores de Anzoátegui =

- Nickname: Armadura Anzoatiguense (Anzoátiguan Armor)
- Leagues: SPB
- Founded: 9 February 2019; 6 years ago
- History: Gladiadores de Oriente (2019–2020); Gladiadores de Anzoátegui (2020–present)
- Arena: Gimnasio Luis Ramos
- Capacity: 5,500
- Location: Puerto La Cruz, Anzoátegui, Venezuela
- President: Fabián Eliantonio
- General manager: José Barberi
- Head coach: James Maye
- Championships: 1 (2023)
- Website: gladiadoresbbc.com

Gladiadores de Anzoátegui (in English: Anzoátegui Gladiators) is a Venezuelan basketball club based in Puerto La Cruz, Anzoátegui. They play in the Superliga Profesional de Baloncesto (SPB), the top-flight league in the country. Currently, Gladiadores also play in the Basketball Champions League Americas (BCLA).

Home games of the team are played in the Gimnasio Luis Ramos, which is also nicknamed the "Caldera del Diablo" (Devil's Caldera).

== History ==
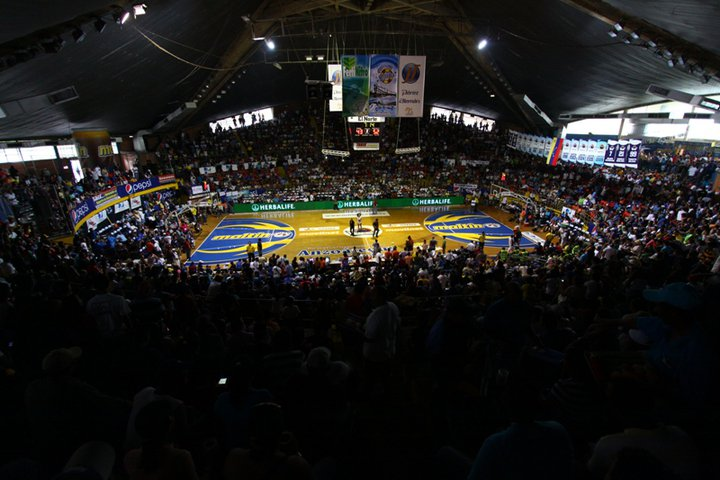
Interior of the Gimnasio Luis Ramos, the home arena of the Gladiadores

The team was founded on 3 February 2019 as Gladiadores de Oriente, and joined the Venezeluan Serie A in their debut season. The following season, the name was changed to Gladiadores de Anzoátegui and the team was confirmed to be one of the teams of the newly-established Superliga Profesional de Baloncesto (SPB). The Gladiadores made their league debut on 1 November 2020, and made the semi-finals in their debut season.

On 7 July 2023, Gladiadores won their first SPB championship, after defeating Guaros de Lara 4–1 in the Grand Final series. Notable foreign players on the Gladiadores roster were Malik Dime, Jordan Adams and Sheldon Mac; Mac was named the Grand Final MVP.

On 17 December 2023, Gladiadores became the first Venezuelan team to play in the BCL Americas. They won their first BCL Americas game against Halcones de Xalapa 82–76.

== Honours ==
Superliga Profesional de Baloncesto

- Champions (1): 2023
- Conference Champions (1): 2023
