= Venezuelan SuperLiga Grand Final MVP =

The Venezuelan SuperLiga Grand Final MVP is an annual award that is handed out to the most valuable player in the Grand Final series of a given season of the Venezuelan SuperLiga season, the highest professional basketball league in Venezuela.

== Winners ==
Season	Player	Pos.	Team	Ref
1997	(Puerto Rico) José Ortiz	C	Guaiqueríes de Margarita	
1998	(United States) Mario Donaldson	PG	Marinos de Anzoátegui	
1999	(United States) Charles Byrd	PG	Trotamundos de Carabobo	
2000	(United States) Mario Donaldson	PG	Cocodrilos de Caracas	
2001	(United States) Kerry Blackshear	SF	Gaiteros del Zulia	
2002	(United States) Monty Wilson	SF	Trotamundos de Carabobo	
2003	(United States) Shelly Clark	F	Marinos de Anzoátegui	
2004	(Venezuela) Johan Piñero	G	Marinos de Anzoátegui	
2005	(Venezuela) Héctor Romero	PF	Marinos de Anzoátegui	
2006	(Venezuela) Richard Lugo	C	Trotamundos de Carabobo	
2007	(United States) Chris Jackson	C	Guaiqueríes de Margarita	
2008	(Dominican Republic) Jack Michael Martínez	PF	Cocodrilos de Caracas	
2009	(Venezuela) Hector Romero	PF	Marinos de Anzoátegui	
2010	(Dominican Republic) Jack Michael Martínez	PF	Cocodrilos de Caracas	
2011	(United States) Donta Smith	SF	Marinos de Anzoátegui	
2012	(Venezuela) Axiers Sucre	PF	Marinos de Anzoátegui	
2013	(United States) Andre Emmett	SG	Cocodrilos de Caracas	
2014	(United States) Aaron Harper	SG	Marinos de Anzoátegui	
2015	(Venezuela) Gregory Vargas	PG	Marinos de Anzoátegui	
2015–16	(United States) Wendell McKines	PF	Cocodrilos de Caracas	
2017	(United States) Nate Robinson	PG	Guaros de Lara	
2018	(United States) Tyshawn Taylor	PG	Guaros de Lara	
2020	(Venezuela) Pedro Chourio	G	Spartans Distrito Capital	
2021-I	(Venezuela) Jhornan Zamora	G	Trotamundos de Carabobo	
2021-II	(Canada) Terry Thomas	G	Guaiqueríes de Margarita	
2022	(Venezuela) Jhornan Zamora (2)	G	Trotamundos de Carabobo	
2023	(United States) Sheldon Mac	G	Gladiadores de Anzoátegui	
2024	(Puerto Rico) Jezreel De Jesús	PG	Gladiadores de Anzoátegui	
