= Sheldon Mac =

American basketball player (born 1992)

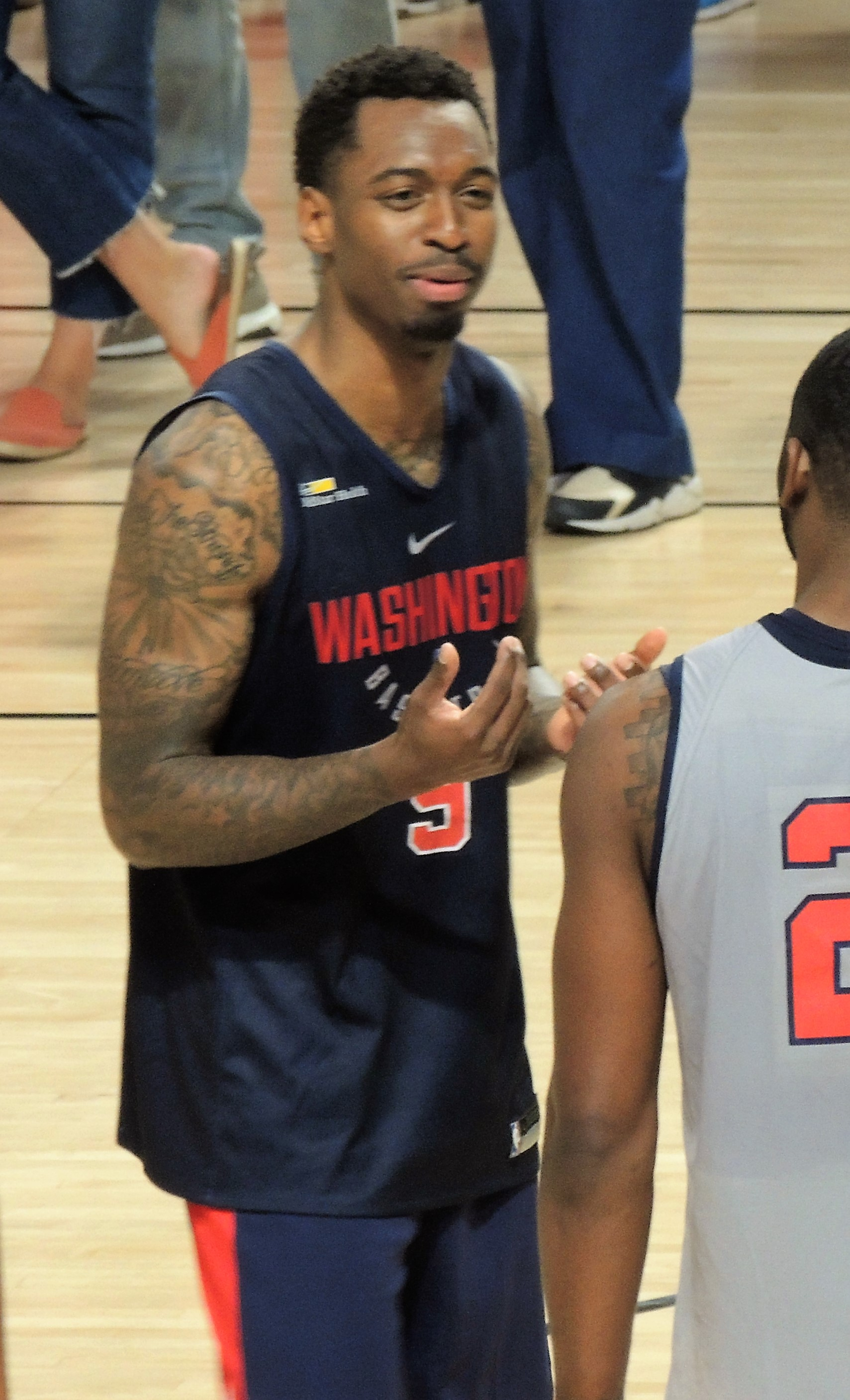
- Mac at Wizards training camp in 2017

Free agent
- Position: Shooting guard / small forward

Personal information
- Born: December 21, 1992 (age 33) Houston, Texas, U.S.
- Listed height: 6 ft 5 in (1.96 m)
- Listed weight: 200 lb (91 kg)

Career information
- High school: Bellaire (Houston, Texas)
- College: Texas (2011–2013); Miami (Florida) (2014–2016)
- NBA draft: 2016: undrafted
- Playing career: 2016–present

Career history
- 2016–2018: Washington Wizards
- 2016: →Delaware 87ers
- 2019–2021: Canton Charge
- 2021: ESSM Le Portel
- 2021: BCM Gravelines-Dunkerque
- 2022: Cleveland Charge
- 2022: Stockton Kings
- 2022: Atléticos de San Germán
- 2022: Gigantes de Carolina
- 2022: Gladiadores de Anzoátegui
- 2022: Club Atlético Aguada
- 2023: Gigantes de Carolina
- 2023: Osos de Manatí
- 2023: Gladiadores de Anzoátegui
- 2023: Jiangxi Ganchi
- 2024: Osos de Manatí
- 2024: Santeros de Aguada
- 2024: San Miguel Beermen

Career highlights
- SPB champion (2022); SPB Grand Final MVP (2022); BSN scoring champion (2022); Second-team All-ACC (2016)
- Stats at NBA.com
- Stats at Basketball Reference

Sheldon Mac (born Sheldon Reeves McClellan; December 21, 1992) is an American professional basketball player who last played for the San Miguel Beermen of the Philippine Basketball Association (PBA). He played college basketball for the Texas Longhorns and the Miami Hurricanes.

== High school career ==
McClellan attended Bellaire High School under Bruce Glover. As a senior, he averaged 25.6 points, 7.2 rebounds, 5.0 assists and 2.0 steals per game while helping Bellaire to a 20–9 mark and the first round of the Class 5A state playoffs.

== College career ==
McClellan began his collegiate career at Texas. In his freshman year, he averaged 11.2 points per game. He averaged 13.2 points in his sophomore season. After his sophomore season, he elected to transfer to Miami.

In his junior season at Miami, McClellan averaged 14.5 points, 4.7 rebounds, 1.9 assists in 33.6 minutes per game. He was an Honorable Mention All-ACC selection as a junior. McClellan was listed on the Oscar Robertson Award preseason watchlist as well as the Naismith College Player of the Year preseason watchlist. McClellan averaged 16.3 points, 3.2 rebounds, 1.6 assists, 1.0 steals and 0.3 blocks in 32.9 minutes per game as a senior. On March 6, 2016, McClellan was named to the Second-Team All-ACC.

== Professional career ==
=== Washington Wizards (2016–2018) ===
After going undrafted in the 2016 NBA draft, McClellan signed with the Washington Wizards on September 23, 2016. He made his debut for the Wizards in their season opener on October 27, 2016, recording seven points and two steals in four minutes off the bench in a 114–99 loss to the Atlanta Hawks. With starting shooting guard Bradley Beal out injured on November 12, 2016, against the Chicago Bulls, McClellan made his first career start and subsequently scored a season-high 15 points in a 106–95 loss. On December 6, 2016, he was assigned to the Delaware 87ers of the NBA Development League, pursuant to the flexible assignment rule. On December 18, 2016, he was recalled by Washington. On April 4, 2017, he was assigned to the Rio Grande Valley Vipers. He was recalled by the Wizards a week later.

In a preseason game on October 8, 2017, Mac suffered a serious injury to his lower left leg, with the Wizards fearing a tear to his left Achilles' tendon. He did not appear in a game for the Wizards in 2017–18, and on February 8, 2018, he was traded to the Atlanta Hawks alongside cash considerations in exchange for a protected 2019 second round draft pick. He was immediately waived by the Hawks upon being acquired.

=== Canton Charge (2019–2021) ===
For the 2019–20 season, Mac joined the Canton Charge of the NBA G League. On January 4, 2020, Mac recorded 39 points, five rebounds, five assists, two steals and one block in a 112–111 overtime win over the Fort Wayne Mad Ants.

On March 8, 2020, the Cleveland Cavaliers signed Mac to a 10-day contract. However, the season was suspended due to the COVID-19 pandemic and Mac's deal expired before he appeared in a game for the team.

Mac re-signed with the Charge for the 2020–21 season. He averaged 17.9 points and 3.6 assists per game in G League play.

=== ESSM Le Portel (2021) ===
On September 24, 2021, Mac signed with ESSM Le Portel of the French LNB Pro A. He averaged 9.3 points and 1.1 assists per game in seven games. Mac parted ways with the team on November 13.

=== BCM Gravelines-Dunkerque (2021) ===
On December 5, 2021, Mac signed with BCM Gravelines-Dunkerque of the LNB Pro A.

=== Cleveland Charge (2022) ===
On January 1, 2022, Mac was acquired by the Cleveland Charge via returning player rights.

=== Stockton Kings (2022) ===
On January 28, 2022, Mac was traded to the Stockton Kings, in exchange for the rights of Dwayne Sutton.

=== Atléticos de San Germán / Gigantes de Carolina (2022) ===
On April 9, 2022, Mac signed with Atléticos de San Germán of the Puerto Rican BSN, averaging 22.2 points and 4.6 assists in five games. On May 2, he signed with Gigantes de Carolina. Overall, he averaged a league-high 24.4 points in the 2022 season.

=== Gladiadores de Anzoátegui (2022) ===
Mac signed with Gladiadores de Anzoátegui. In July 2022, Mac guided the Gladiadores to their first-ever SPB championship, and was named the Grand Final MVP following his performance in the Grand Final against Guaros de Lara. Mac averaged 21.4 minutes, 14.6 points, 3.6 rebounds, 2.4 assists per game while shooting 55% from the field and 46.1% from three-point range.

=== Osos de Manatí (2023–2024) ===
On April 24, 2023, Mac signed with the Osos de Manatí of the Baloncesto Superior Nacional, averaging 22.4 points, 4.9 rebounds, 4.1 assists and 1.1 steals which included a 60-point game. On March 29, 2024, he re-signed with Manatí.

=== Santeros de Aguada (2024) ===
On May 17, 2024, Mac signed with the Santeros de Aguada of the Baloncesto Superior Nacional after leaving Manatí.

=== San Miguel Beeermen (2024) ===
In September 2024, Mac signed with the San Miguel Beermen of the Philippine Basketball Association to replace Jordan Adams as the team's import for the 2024 PBA Governors' Cup. However, he only played one game as the team brought back Adams.

== NBA career statistics ==
Legend
GP	Games played	GS	Games started	MPG	Minutes per game
FG%	Field goal percentage	3P%	3-point field goal percentage	FT%	Free throw percentage
RPG	Rebounds per game	APG	Assists per game	SPG	Steals per game
BPG	Blocks per game	PPG	Points per game	**Bold**	Career high

=== Regular season ===
Year	Team	GP	GS	MPG	FG%	3P%	FT%	RPG	APG	SPG	BPG	PPG
2016–17	Washington	30	3	9.6	.400	.233	.852	1.1	.5	.3	.1	3.0
Career		30	3	9.6	.400	.233	.852	1.1	.5	.3	.1	3.0

=== Playoffs ===
Year	Team	GP	GS	MPG	FG%	3P%	FT%	RPG	APG	SPG	BPG	PPG
2017	Washington	7	0	2.4	.556	.400	1.000	.3	.0	.0	.0	2.0
Career		7	0	2.4	.556	.400	1.000	.3	.0	.0	.0	2.0

== Personal life ==
Mac is the son of Angel Johnson and has one brother Justin. In February 2017, McClellan had his name legally changed to Sheldon Mac.
