= Rob Kurz =

American basketball player (born 1985)

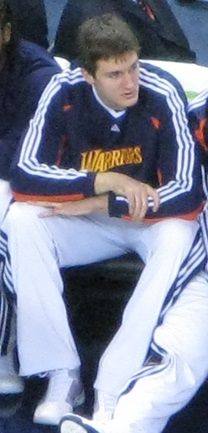
- Kurz with the Golden State Warriors in 2008

Personal information
- Born: March 5, 1985 (age 41) Philadelphia, Pennsylvania, U.S.
- Listed height: 6 ft 9 in (2.06 m)
- Listed weight: 232 lb (105 kg)

Career information
- High school: William Penn Charter School (Philadelphia, Pennsylvania)
- College: Notre Dame (2004–2008)
- NBA draft: 2008: undrafted
- Playing career: 2008–2013
- Position: Small forward
- Number: 31

Career history
- 2008–2009: Golden State Warriors
- 2009–2010: Fort Wayne Mad Ants
- 2010–2011: Granada
- 2011: Artland Dragons
- 2011–2012: Murcia
- 2012: SLUC Nancy
- 2012–2013: Baloncesto Fuenlabrada

Career highlights
- NBA D-League All Star (2010); All-NBA D-League Second Team (2010)
- Stats at NBA.com
- Stats at Basketball Reference

Robert Karl Kurz (born March 5, 1985) is an American former professional basketball player. He played one season in the National Basketball Association (NBA) for the Golden State Warriors, and later played in the top leagues in Spain, Germany, and France.

== High school ==
Kurz transferred to Penn Charter following two years at Germantown Academy. In his junior year at Penn Charter, Kurz averaged 18.0 points and 12.0 rebounds per game. As a senior, he averaged 18.5 points and 12.0 rebounds per game.

== College career ==
In his freshman season at the University of Notre Dame, Kurz appeared in fourteen games and averaged 1.4 points and 1.1 rebounds per game. He recorded career bests of 11 points and 7 rebounds in a National Invitation Tournament first-round loss to Holy Cross.

In his sophomore season, Kurz averaged 6.4 points and 5.1 rebounds per game, appearing in all thirty games. Kurz was named to the Big East Weekly Honor Roll on November 21 after recording 18 points in Notre Dame's season opener.

Kurz was one of the three captains for Notre Dame his junior season. He averaged 12.6 points and 8.0 rebounds per game during the season. On December 4, 2006, Kurz was named to the Big East Weekly Honor Roll for the second time in his career after averaging 19.6 points and 7.7 rebounds per game in wins over Lehigh, Winston-Salem, and Maryland.

Kurz served as a team captain for the second consecutive season, and was also the only senior on Notre Dame's roster. He started in all thirty-three games and averaged 12.8 points and 7.1 rebounds per game. Kurz led Notre Dame with 48 blocks, finishing with 122 blocked shots in his career, which ranks sixth all-time for Notre Dame. On December 31, 2007, he was named to the Big East Weekly Honor Roll for the third time in his career.

== Professional career ==
Kurz played with the Golden State Warriors in the NBA Summer League prior to the 2008–09 NBA season. In 11 games, Kurz averaged 7.1 points and 4.5 rebounds per game. He also played four games with the Warriors at the Rocky Mountain Revue, where he averaged 12.5 points and 6.8 rebounds per game. On September 9, 2008, Kurz signed a contract with the Warriors. On April 11, 2009, Kurz tallied a career-high 21 points against the Utah Jazz.

Kurz agreed to a non-guaranteed contract with the Cleveland Cavaliers on August 15, 2009. On October 19, Kurz was waived by the Cavaliers. He played in five games during the preseason, averaging 3.4 points and 2.0 rebounds in 9.8 minutes per game.

From 2009 to 2010 Kurz played 39 games for the Fort Wayne Mad Ants of the NBA D-League, averaging 17.5 ppg and 10.1 rpg.

Kurz was signed by the Chicago Bulls on April 9, 2010, but never played for the team and was waived on June 30.

In August 2010, Kurz signed with the Spanish club CB Granada.

In January 2011, Kurz signed with the German club Artland Dragons. He returned to Spain in July 2011 by signing with CB Murcia for one season.

In February 2012, Kurz signed with the French club SLUC Nancy.

Prior to the 2012–13 NBA season, Kurz agreed to play with the Sacramento Kings in the NBA Summer League. In September 2012, Kurz and Micah Downs joined the Boston Celtics as training camp invitees, but neither player made the team's final roster.

In December 2012, Kurz signed with Mad-Croc Fuenlabrada.

== NBA career statistics ==
Legend
GP	Games played	GS	Games started	MPG	Minutes per game
FG%	Field goal percentage	3P%	3-point field goal percentage	FT%	Free throw percentage
RPG	Rebounds per game	APG	Assists per game	SPG	Steals per game
BPG	Blocks per game	PPG	Points per game	**Bold**	Career high

=== Regular season ===
Year	Team	GP	GS	MPG	FG%	3P%	FT%	RPG	APG	SPG	BPG	PPG
2008–09	Golden State	40	5	11.1	.389	.395	.800	2.0	.5	.3	.5	3.9
Career		40	5	11.1	.389	.395	.800	2.0	.5	.3	.4	3.9
