= Thor manningi =

Manning grass shrimp

Scientific classification
- Kingdom: Animalia
- Phylum: Arthropoda
- Clade: Pancrustacea
- Class: Malacostraca
- Order: Decapoda
- Suborder: Pleocyemata
- Infraorder: Caridea
- Superfamily: Alpheoidea
- Family: Thoridae
- Genus: Thor
- Species: T. manningi

Binomial name
- Thor manningi Chace, 1972

Species of crustacean

Thor manningi is a species of shrimp. The common name for the species is the Manning grass shrimp. On average the life span in this species is 4 to 5 months. The species uses drag powered swimming to move from place to place.

== Distribution ==
Thor manningi has an amphiamerican distribution, found in shallow coastal regions of the Western Atlantic, including off the coast of South Carolina in the United States, and the East Pacific.

== Reproduction ==
Thor manningi is a trioecious species with males, females and protandrous hermaphrodites. Individuals approaching sex change have a mixture of male and female characteristics. In this species 50% of the population are males, 49% protandric hermaphrodites, and 1% are females.
