= 2019 FIBA Basketball World Cup squads =

The 2019 FIBA Basketball World Cup included teams whose rosters consisted of 12 players; a team could opt to have one naturalized player as per FIBA eligibility rules in their roster.

Player ages are as of 31 August 2019, the first day of the tournament.

== Group A ==
=== China ===
China men's national basketball team – 2019 FIBA World Cup roster
Players
Coaches

Pos.	No.	Name	Age – Date of birth	Height	Club	Ctr.
SG	1	Zhao Rui	23 – 14 January 1996	1.93 m (6 ft 4 in)	Guangdong Southern Tigers	(China)
SG	5	Fang Shuo	28 – 7 September 1990	1.88 m (6 ft 2 in)	Beijing Ducks	(China)
PG	6	Guo Ailun	25 – 14 November 1993	1.92 m (6 ft 4 in)	Liaoning Flying Leopards	(China)
SF	9	Zhai Xiaochuan	26 – 24 March 1993	2.05 m (6 ft 9 in)	Beijing Ducks	(China)
PF	11	Yi Jianlian (C)	31 – 27 October 1987	2.12 m (6 ft 11 in)	Guangdong Southern Tigers	(China)
SF	13	Kelanbaike Makan	26 – 27 September 1992	1.97 m (6 ft 6 in)	Xinjiang Flying Tigers	(China)
C	15	Zhou Qi	23 – 16 January 1996	2.17 m (7 ft 1 in)	Xinjiang Flying Tigers	(China)
G	17	Sun Minghui	23 – 26 April 1996	1.92 m (6 ft 4 in)	Zhejiang Lions	(China)
PF	20	Ren Junfei	29 – 4 February 1990	2.03 m (6 ft 8 in)	Guangdong Southern Tigers	(China)
F	23	Abudushalamu Abudurexiti	23 – 20 May 1996	2.03 m (6 ft 8 in)	Xinjiang Flying Tigers	(China)
PG	24	Zhao Jiwei	24 – 25 August 1995	1.85 m (6 ft 1 in)	Liaoning Flying Leopards	(China)
C	31	Wang Zhelin	25 – 20 January 1994	2.14 m (7 ft 0 in)	Fujian Sturgeons	(China)

Head coach

- (China) Li Nan

Assistant coach(es)

- (Greece) Yannis Christopoulos
- (United States) Scott Roth

Legend

- (C) Team captain
- Club – describes last
  club before the tournament
- Age – describes age
  on 31 August 2019

=== Ivory Coast ===
Ivory Coast national basketball team – 2019 FIBA Basketball World Cup roster
Players
Coaches

Pos.	No.	Name	Age – Date of birth	Height	Club	Ctr.
SG	1	Charles Abouo	30 – 11 April 1989	1.94 m (6 ft 4 in)	ADA Blois Basket 41	(France)
PG	6	Bryan Pamba	27 – 7 January 1992	1.91 m (6 ft 3 in)	Caen Basket Calvados	(France)
PF	7	Adjehi Baru	27 – 10 December 1991	2.07 m (6 ft 9 in)	Leyma Básquet Coruña	(Spain)
C	8	Frejus Zerbo	30 – 2 April 1989	2.13 m (7 ft 0 in)	JL Bourg en Bresse	(France)
PG	10	Souleyman Diabate	32 – 21 July 1987	1.82 m (6 ft 0 in)	SLUC Nancy Basket	(France)
F	11	Vafessa Fofana	27 – 12 June 1992	2.01 m (6 ft 7 in)	Cholet Basket	(France)
PF	12	Bali Coulibaly	24 – 3 July 1995	2.01 m (6 ft 7 in)	TOAC Basket	(France)
F	13	Tiegbe Bamba	28 – 21 January 1991	2.01 m (6 ft 7 in)	C'Chartres Basket	(France)
SG	14	Guy Landry Edi	30 – 26 December 1988	1.99 m (6 ft 6 in)	Champagne Châlons-Reims Basket	(France)
C	15	Mohamed Koné	38 – 24 March 1981	2.10 m (6 ft 11 in)	JA Vichy Clermont	(France)
PF	21	Deon Thompson	30 – 16 September 1988	2.04 m (6 ft 8 in)	Unicaja Baloncesto	(Spain)
PG	30	Abraham Sie	20 – 31 August 1999	1.79 m (5 ft 10 in)	Abidjan Basket Club	(Ivory Coast)

Head coach

- (Italy) Paolo Povia

Assistant coach(es)

- (Italy) Luca Palumbo
- (Ivory Coast) Ismaël N'Diaye

Legend

- (C) Team captain
- Club – describes last
  club before the tournament
- Age – describes age
  on 31 August 2019

=== Poland ===
Poland national basketball team – 2019 FIBA Basketball World Cup roster
Players
Coaches

Pos.	No.	Name	Age – Date of birth	Height	Club	Ctr.
C	2	Aleksander Balcerowski	18 – 19 November 2000	2.15 m (7 ft 1 in)	Herbalife Gran Canaria	(Spain)
SF	3	Michał Sokołowski	26 – 11 December 1992	1.96 m (6 ft 5 in)	Stelmet Zielona Góra	(Poland)
PF	5	Aaron Cel	32 – 4 March 1987	2.05 m (6 ft 9 in)	Twarde Pierniki Toruń	(Poland)
PG	6	A.J. Slaughter	32 – 3 August 1987	1.91 m (6 ft 3 in)	Real Betis Baloncesto	(Spain)
SG	9	Mateusz Ponitka	26 – 29 August 1993	1.98 m (6 ft 6 in)	Lokomotiv Kuban	(Russia)
SF	12	Adam Waczyński	29 – 15 October 1989	1.95 m (6 ft 5 in)	Unicaja Baloncesto	(Spain)
C	13	Dominik Olejniczak	23 – 1 July 1996	2.08 m (6 ft 10 in)	Ole Miss Rebels	(United States)
PG	15	Kamil Łączyński	30 – 17 April 1989	1.83 m (6 ft 0 in)	Anwil	(Poland)
SG	33	Karol Gruszecki	29 – 4 November 1989	1.96 m (6 ft 5 in)	Twarde Pierniki Toruń	(Poland)
C	34	Adam Hrycaniuk	35 – 15 March 1984	2.06 m (6 ft 9 in)	Arka Gdynia	(Poland)
PG	55	Łukasz Koszarek	35 – 12 January 1984	1.87 m (6 ft 2 in)	Stelmet Zielona Góra	(Poland)
PF	77	Damian Kulig	32 – 23 June 1987	2.06 m (6 ft 9 in)	İstanbul BBSK	(Turkey)

Head coach

- (United States) Mike Taylor

Assistant coach(es)

- (Poland) Arkadiusz Miłoszewski
- (Poland) Krzysztof Szablowski

Legend

- (C) Team captain
- Club – describes last
  club before the tournament
- Age – describes age
  on 31 August 2019

=== Venezuela ===
The final roster was announced on 27 August 2019.

Venezuela national basketball team – 2019 FIBA Basketball World Cup roster
Players
Coaches

Pos.	No.	Name	Age – Date of birth	Height	Club	Ctr.
PG	5	Gregory Vargas	33 – 18 February 1986	1.80 m (5 ft 11 in)	Hapoel Haifa	(Israel)
SG	7	Jhornan Zamora	30 – 30 January 1989	1.96 m (6 ft 5 in)	Évreux	(France)
SG	9	Pedro Chourio	29 – 13 March 1990	1.86 m (6 ft 1 in)	Trotamundos	(Venezuela)
SF	10	José Vargas	37 – 23 January 1982	1.96 m (6 ft 5 in)	Guaros de Lara	(Venezuela)
PF	11	Luis Bethelmy	32 – 14 October 1986	2.00 m (6 ft 7 in)	Guaros de Lara	(Venezuela)
F	13	Anthony Pérez	25 – 29 September 1993	2.05 m (6 ft 9 in)	Trotamundos	(Venezuela)
PF	14	Miguel Ruiz	28 – 20 December 1990	2.02 m (6 ft 8 in)	Trotamundos de Carabobo	(Venezuela)
C	15	Windi Graterol	32 – 10 September 1986	2.04 m (6 ft 8 in)	Boca Juniors	(Argentina)
PG	19	Heissler Guillent	32 – 17 December 1986	1.83 m (6 ft 0 in)	Guaros de Lara	(Venezuela)
SF	21	Dwight Lewis	31 – 7 October 1987	1.98 m (6 ft 6 in)	Gimnasia Comodoro	(Argentina)
PF	23	Michael Carrera	26 – 7 January 1993	1.96 m (6 ft 5 in)	Trotamundos de Carabobo	(Venezuela)
PF	43	Néstor Colmenares	31 – 5 September 1987	2.03 m (6 ft 8 in)	Guaros de Lara	(Venezuela)

Head coach

- (Argentina) Fernando Duró

Assistant coach(es)

- (Venezuela) Pablo Favarel
- (Venezuela) Nelson Solórzano

Legend

- (C) Team captain
- Club – describes last
  club before the tournament
- Age – describes age
  on 31 August 2019

== Group B ==
=== Argentina ===
The Argentinian team announced the 12-player final roster on 7th of August.

Argentina national basketball team – 2019 FIBA Basketball World Cup roster
Players
Coaches

Pos.	No.	Name	Age – Date of birth	Height	Club	Ctr.
C	1	Agustín Caffaro	24 – 6 February 1995	2.10 m (6 ft 11 in)	San Lorenzo	(Argentina)
PG	3	Luca Vildoza	24 – 11 August 1995	1.91 m (6 ft 3 in)	Saski Baskonia	(Spain)
PF	4	Luis Scola (C)	39 – 30 April 1980	2.06 m (6 ft 9 in)	Shanghai Sharks	(China)
PG	7	Facundo Campazzo	28 – 23 March 1991	1.81 m (5 ft 11 in)	Real Madrid	(Spain)
PG	8	Nicolás Laprovíttola	29 – 31 January 1990	1.93 m (6 ft 4 in)	Real Madrid	(Spain)
SF	9	Nicolás Brussino	26 – 2 March 1993	2.03 m (6 ft 8 in)	Basket Zaragoza	(Spain)
SG	10	Máximo Fjellerup	21 – 27 November 1997	1.97 m (6 ft 6 in)	San Lorenzo	(Argentina)
C	12	Marcos Delía	27 – 8 April 1992	2.10 m (6 ft 11 in)	Fuerza Regia	(Mexico)
PF	14	Gabriel Deck	24 – 8 February 1995	2.00 m (6 ft 7 in)	Real Madrid	(Spain)
SG	25	Lucio Redivo	25 – 12 February 1994	1.83 m (6 ft 0 in)	Breogán	(Spain)
SF	29	Patricio Garino	26 – 17 March 1993	2.01 m (6 ft 7 in)	Saski Baskonia	(Spain)
PF	83	Tayavek Gallizzi	26 – 8 February 1993	2.06 m (6 ft 9 in)	Regatas Corrientes	(Argentina)

Head coach

- (Argentina) Sergio Hernández

Assistant coach(es)

- (Argentina) Nicolás Casalanguida
- (Argentina) Gonzalo García
- (Argentina) Silvio Santander

Legend

- (C) Team captain
- Club – describes last
  club before the tournament
- Age – describes age
  on 31 August 2019

=== Nigeria ===
The final roster was announced on 27 August 2019.

Nigeria national basketball team – 2019 FIBA Basketball World Cup roster
Players
Coaches

Pos.	No.	Name	Age – Date of birth	Height	Club	Ctr.
PG	1	Ike Iroegbu	24 – 14 March 1995	1.88 m (6 ft 2 in)	Lietkabelis Panevėžys	(Lithuania)
PG	4	Ben Uzoh	31 – 18 March 1988	1.91 m (6 ft 3 in)	Caballeros de Culiacán	(Mexico)
SG	5	Stan Okoye	28 – 10 April 1991	1.97 m (6 ft 6 in)	Gran Canaria	(Spain)
PF	6	Ike Diogu	35 – 11 September 1983	2.06 m (6 ft 9 in)	Shimane Susanoo Magic	(Japan)
SF	7	Al-Farouq Aminu	28 – 21 September 1990	2.06 m (6 ft 9 in)	Orlando Magic	(United States)
C	8	Ekpe Udoh	32 – 20 May 1987	2.08 m (6 ft 10 in)	Beijing Ducks	(China)
PF	10	Chimezie Metu	22 – 22 March 1997	2.08 m (6 ft 10 in)	Sacramento Kings	(United States)
C	13	Talib Zanna	28 – 1 October 1990	2.06 m (6 ft 9 in)	Ironi Nes Ziona	(Israel)
SG	20	Josh Okogie	20 – 1 September 1998	1.93 m (6 ft 4 in)	Minnesota Timberwolves	(United States)
PG	22	Gabe Vincent	23 – 14 June 1996	1.91 m (6 ft 3 in)	Stockton Kings	(United States)
SF	33	Jordan Nwora	20 – 9 September 1998	2.03 m (6 ft 8 in)	Louisville Cardinals	(United States)
C	50	Michael Eric	31 – 24 June 1988	2.11 m (6 ft 11 in)	Saski Baskonia	(Spain)

Head coach

- (Nigeria) Alexander Nwora

Assistant coach(es)

- (United States) Kevin Burleson
- (Nigeria) Ogoh Odaudu
- (United States) Mfon Udofia

Legend

- (C) Team captain
- Club – describes last
  club before the tournament
- Age – describes age
  on 31 August 2019

=== Russia ===
Russia national basketball team – 2019 FIBA Basketball World Cup roster
Players
Coaches

Pos.	No.	Name	Age – Date of birth	Height	Club	Ctr.
PG	2	Andrei Sopin	22 – 7 July 1997	1.86 m (6 ft 1 in)	MBA Moscow	(Russia)
SF	3	Sergey Karasev	25 – 26 October 1993	2.01 m (6 ft 7 in)	Zenit Saint Petersburg	(Russia)
SG	4	Evgeny Baburin	32 – 4 July 1987	1.90 m (6 ft 3 in)	Nizhny Novgorod	(Russia)
SG	6	Grigory Motovilov	21 – 7 February 1998	1.91 m (6 ft 3 in)	Spartak Primorye	(Russia)
SG	7	Vitaly Fridzon	33 – 14 October 1985	1.95 m (6 ft 5 in)	Lokomotiv Kuban	(Russia)
C	8	Vladimir Ivlev	29 – 28 February 1990	2.07 m (6 ft 9 in)	Lokomotiv Kuban	(Russia)
PF	11	Semyon Antonov	30 – 18 July 1989	2.02 m (6 ft 8 in)	CSKA Moscow	(Russia)
PF	12	Andrey Zubkov	26 – 29 June 1991	2.05 m (6 ft 9 in)	Khimki	(Russia)
C	20	Andrey Vorontsevich	30 – 17 July 1987	2.07 m (6 ft 9 in)	CSKA Moscow	(Russia)
PG	30	Mikhail Kulagin	25 – 4 August 1994	1.92 m (6 ft 4 in)	CSKA Moscow	(Russia)
PF	31	Evgeny Valiev	29 – 3 May 1990	2.05 m (6 ft 9 in)	Zenit Saint Petersburg	(Russia)
SF	41	Nikita Kurbanov	32 – 5 October 1986	2.02 m (6 ft 8 in)	CSKA Moscow	(Russia)

Head coach

- (Russia) Sergei Bazarevich

Assistant coach(es)

- (Serbia) Saša Grujić
- (Russia) Sergei Bykov
- (Russia) Denis Goldevsky

Legend

- (C) Team captain
- Club – describes last
  club before the tournament
- Age – describes age
  on 31 August 2019

=== South Korea ===
The final roster was announced on 31 July 2019.

South Korea national basketball team – 2019 FIBA Basketball World Cup roster
Players
Coaches

Pos.	No.	Name	Age – Date of birth	Height	Club	Ctr.
SG	1	Park Chan-hee	32 – April 17, 1987	1.91 m (6 ft 3 in)	Incheon Electroland Elephants	(South Korea)
SF	2	Choi Jun-yong	25 – April 4, 1994	2.00 m (6 ft 7 in)	Seoul SK Knights	(South Korea)
SG	3	Lee Jung-hyun	32 – March 3, 1987	1.91 m (6 ft 3 in)	Jeonju KCC Egis	(South Korea)
PG	5	Kim Sun-hyung	31 – July 1, 1988	1.87 m (6 ft 2 in)	Seoul SK Knights	(South Korea)
PG	6	Heo Hoon	24 – August 16, 1995	1.81 m (5 ft 11 in)	Busan KT Sonicboom	(South Korea)
SF	11	Yang Hee-jong	35 – May 11, 1984	1.93 m (6 ft 4 in)	Anyang KGC	(South Korea)
PF	12	Jeong Hyo-geun	25 – December 14, 1993	2.00 m (6 ft 7 in)	Incheon Electroland Elephants	(South Korea)
PF	13	Kang Sang-jae	24 – December 31, 1994	2.02 m (6 ft 8 in)	Incheon Electroland Elephants	(South Korea)
C	15	Kim Jong-kyu	28 – July 3, 1991	2.06 m (6 ft 9 in)	Changwon LG Sakers	(South Korea)
C	20	Ricardo Ratliffe	30 – February 20, 1989	2.03 m (6 ft 8 in)	Ulsan Mobis Phoebus	(South Korea)
PF	33	Lee Seoung-hyun	27 – April 16, 1992	1.99 m (6 ft 6 in)	Goyang Orions	(South Korea)
SG	43	Lee Dae-sung	29 – May 30, 1990	1.90 m (6 ft 3 in)	Ulsan Mobis Phoebus	(South Korea)

Head coach

- (South Korea) Kim Sang-shik

Assistant coach(es)

- (South Korea) Cho Sang-hyun

Legend

- (C) Team captain
- Club – describes last
  club before the tournament
- Age – describes age
  on 31 August 2019

== Group C ==
=== Iran ===
The final roster was announced on 23 August 2019.

Iran national basketball team – 2019 FIBA Basketball World Cup roster
Players
Coaches

Pos.	No.	Name	Age – Date of birth	Height	Club	Ctr.
C	4	Meisam Mirzaei	27 – April 15, 1992	2.08 m (6 ft 10 in)	Petrochimi	(Iran)
PG	5	Sajjad Mashayekhi	25 – February 23, 1994	1.80 m (5 ft 11 in)	Petrochimi	(Iran)
SG	6	Hamed Hosseinzadeh	28 – October 6, 1990	1.85 m (6 ft 1 in)	Chemidor	(Iran)
SG	8	Behnam Yakhchali	21 – December 31, 1997	1.91 m (6 ft 3 in)	Nanjing Monkey	(China)
PG	9	Rasoul Mozafari	25 – July 22, 1994	1.88 m (6 ft 2 in)	Naft Abadan	(Iran)
SF	13	Mohammad Jamshidi	23 – July 30, 1996	1.99 m (6 ft 6 in)	Chemidor	(Iran)
SF	14	Samad Nikkhah Bahrami (C)	36 – May 11, 1983	1.98 m (6 ft 6 in)	Free agent
C	15	Hamed Haddadi	34 – May 19, 1985	2.18 m (7 ft 2 in)	Champville	(Lebanon)
PF	19	Arman Zangeneh	26 – June 16, 1993	2.03 m (6 ft 8 in)	Chemidor	(Iran)
PF	20	Mike Rostampour	27 – December 20, 1991	2.03 m (6 ft 8 in)	Naft Abadan	(Iran)
C	23	Aaron Geramipoor	26 – September 11, 1992	2.13 m (7 ft 0 in)	Free agent
PF	77	Mohammad Hassanzadeh	28 – October 6, 1990	2.03 m (6 ft 8 in)	Naft Abadan	(Iran)

Head coach

- (Iran) Mehran Shahintab

Assistant coach(es)

- (Iran) Farzad Kouhian
- (Iran) Mohammad Abedini

Legend

- (C) Team captain
- Club – describes last
  club before the tournament
- Age – describes age
  on 31 August 2019

=== Puerto Rico ===
Puerto Rico national basketball team – 2019 FIBA Basketball World Cup roster
Players
Coaches

Pos.	No.	Name	Age – Date of birth	Height	Club	Ctr.
SF	0	Isaiah Piñeiro	22 – February 28, 1997	6 ft 8 in (2.03 m)	Sacramento Kings	(United States)
PF	1	Ramón Clemente	33 – December 11, 1985	6 ft 6 in (1.98 m)	San Lorenzo	(Argentina)
PF	7	Devon Collier	28 – January 20, 1991	6 ft 7 in (2.01 m)	Capitanes de Arecibo	(Puerto Rico)
PG	9	Gary Browne	25 – March 24, 1994	6 ft 1 in (1.85 m)	Ironi Nes Ziona	(Israel)
C	12	Jorge Díaz	29 – November 13, 1989	7 ft 0 in (2.13 m)	Piratas de Quebradillas	(Puerto Rico)
PG	13	Ángel Rodríguez	26 – December 5, 1992	6 ft 2 in (1.88 m)	Rio Grande Valley Vipers	(United States)
G	24	Gian Clavell	25 – November 26, 1993	6 ft 5 in (1.96 m)	Movistar Estudiantes	(Spain)
SG	33	David Huertas (C)	32 – June 2, 1987	6 ft 5 in (1.96 m)	Leñadores de Durango	(Mexico)
F	34	Renaldo Balkman	35 – July 14, 1984	6 ft 7 in (2.01 m)	San Miguel Alab Pilipinas	(Philippines)
G/F	42	Alex Franklin	31 – July 11, 1988	6 ft 5 in (1.96 m)	Piratas de Quebradillas	(Puerto Rico)
C	43	Chris Brady	23 – September 15, 1995	6 ft 10 in (2.08 m)	Fukushima Firebonds	(Japan)
G	44	Javier Mojica	35 – August 31, 1984	6 ft 1 in (1.85 m)	Leñadores de Durango	(Mexico)

Head coach

- (Puerto Rico) Eddie Casiano

Assistant coach(es)

- (Puerto Rico) Omar González
- (Puerto Rico) Manolo Cintrón
- (Puerto Rico) Rafael Torres

Legend

- (C) Team captain
- Club – describes last
  club before the tournament
- Age – describes age
  on August 31, 2019

=== Spain ===
The final roster was announced on 21 August 2019.

Spain national basketball team – 2019 FIBA Basketball World Cup roster
Players
Coaches

Pos.	No.	Name	Age – Date of birth	Height	Club	Ctr.
PG	1	Quino Colom	30 – November 1, 1988	1.88 m (6 ft 2 in)	Valencia Basket	(Spain)
SF	5	Rudy Fernández (C)	34 – April 4, 1985	1.96 m (6 ft 5 in)	Real Madrid	(Spain)
SG	8	Pau Ribas	32 – March 2, 1987	1.97 m (6 ft 6 in)	FC Barcelona	(Spain)
PG	9	Ricky Rubio	28 – October 21, 1990	1.88 m (6 ft 2 in)	Phoenix Suns	(United States)
PF	10	Víctor Claver	31 – August 30, 1988	2.07 m (6 ft 9 in)	FC Barcelona	(Spain)
C	13	Marc Gasol	34 – January 29, 1985	2.11 m (6 ft 11 in)	Toronto Raptors	(Canada)
C	14	Willy Hernangómez	25 – May 23, 1994	2.11 m (6 ft 11 in)	Charlotte Hornets	(United States)
PF	18	Pierre Oriola	26 – October 25, 1992	2.06 m (6 ft 9 in)	FC Barcelona	(Spain)
SF	22	Xavi Rabaseda	30 – February 24, 1989	2.01 m (6 ft 7 in)	CB Gran Canaria	(Spain)
SG	23	Sergio Llull	31 – November 15, 1987	1.91 m (6 ft 3 in)	Real Madrid	(Spain)
SF	33	Javier Beirán	32 – May 22, 1987	2.00 m (6 ft 7 in)	CB Gran Canaria	(Spain)
PF	41	Juan Hernangómez	23 – September 22, 1995	2.07 m (6 ft 9 in)	Denver Nuggets	(United States)

Head coach

- (Italy) Sergio Scariolo

Assistant coach(es)

- (Spain) Manuel Aller
- (Spain) Luis Guil
- (Spain) Ángel Sánchez-Cañete

Legend

- (C) Team captain
- Club – describes last
  club before the tournament
- Age – describes age
  on 31 August 2019

=== Tunisia ===
The final roster was announced on 18 August 2019.

Tunisia national basketball team – 2019 FIBA Basketball World Cup roster
Players
Coaches

Pos.	No.	Name	Age – Date of birth	Height	Club	Ctr.
PG	4	Omar Abada	26 – 20 April 1993	1.89 m (6 ft 2 in)	Saint-Chamond Basket	(France)
SF	5	Ziyed Chennoufi	30 – 29 November 1988	2.06 m (6 ft 9 in)	ES Radès (basketball)	(Tunisia)
SG	7	Mourad El Mabrouk	32 – 19 October 1986	1.89 m (6 ft 2 in)	Hermine Nantes Basket	(France)
SG	8	Omar Mouhli	33 – 19 March 1986	1.96 m (6 ft 5 in)	ES Radès (basketball)	(Tunisia)
SF	9	Mohamed Hadidane	33 – 27 April 1986	2.06 m (6 ft 9 in)	ES Radès (basketball)	(Tunisia)
C	11	Mokhtar Ghyaza	32 – 15 November 1986	2.14 m (7 ft 0 in)	ES Radès (basketball)	(Tunisia)
PF	12	Makram Ben Romdhane	30 – 27 March 1989	2.06 m (6 ft 9 in)	Saint-Chamond Basket	(France)
PF	19	Mohamed Abbassi	28 – 28 March 1991	2.06 m (6 ft 9 in)	ES Radès (basketball)	(Tunisia)
SG	20	Michael Roll (NP)	32 – 12 April 1987	1.98 m (6 ft 6 in)	Olimpia Milano	(Italy)
PF	45	Radhouane Slimane	39 – 16 August 1980	2.06 m (6 ft 9 in)	US Monastir (basketball)	(Tunisia)
C	50	Salah Mejri	33 – 15 June 1986	2.19 m (7 ft 2 in)	Dallas Mavericks	(United States)
PG	66	Nizar Knioua	36 – 8 June 1983	1.89 m (6 ft 2 in)	Stade Nabeulien	(Tunisia)

Head coach

- (Portugal) Mário Palma

Assistant coach(es)

- (Tunisia) Khelil Ben Ameur
- (Tunisia) Kacem Louerchefani

Legend

- (C) Team captain
- (NP) Naturalized player
- Club – describes last
  club before the tournament
- Age – describes age
  on 31 August 2019

== Group D ==
=== Angola ===
The final roster was announced on 7 August 2019.

Angola national basketball team – 2019 FIBA Basketball World Cup roster
Players
Coaches

Pos.	No.	Name	Age – Date of birth	Height	Club	Ctr.
PG	1	Gerson Domingos	23 – April 16, 1996	1.78 m (5 ft 10 in)	Interclube	(Angola)
C	2	Yanick Moreira	28 – July 31, 1991	2.08 m (6 ft 10 in)	Virtus Bologna	(Italy)
SG	3	Jerson Gonçalves	23 – March 29, 1996	1.93 m (6 ft 4 in)	Petro de Luanda	(Angola)
SF	4	Olímpio Cipriano	37 – April 9, 1982	1.93 m (6 ft 4 in)	Petro de Luanda	(Angola)
SG	6	Carlos Morais	33 – October 16, 1985	1.93 m (6 ft 4 in)	Petro de Luanda	(Angola)
PF	9	Leonel Paulo	33 – April 30, 1986	1.98 m (6 ft 6 in)	Petro de Luanda	(Angola)
SF	10	Jose Antonio	29 – July 31, 1990	1.98 m (6 ft 6 in)	Petro de Luanda	(Angola)
PF	15	Eduardo Mingas (C)	40 – January 29, 1979	1.98 m (6 ft 6 in)	Primeiro de Agosto	(Angola)
C	16	Hermenegildo Mbunga	33 – September 4, 1985	2.06 m (6 ft 9 in)	Benfica do Libolo	(Angola)
PF	23	Reggie Moore	38 – March 31, 1981	2.03 m (6 ft 8 in)	Petro de Luanda	(Angola)
C	32	Valdelício Joaquim	29 – April 15, 1990	2.08 m (6 ft 10 in)	Obras Sanitarias	(Argentina)
PG	37	Jacques Conceição	29 – September 4, 1989	1.91 m (6 ft 3 in)	Primeiro de Agosto	(Angola)

Head coach

- (United States) Will Voigt

Assistant coach(es)

- (Angola) Walter Costa
- (Angola) Nataniel Lucas

Legend

- (C) Team captain
- Club – describes last
  club before the tournament
- Age – describes age
  on 31 August 2019

=== Italy ===
The final roster was announced on 29 August 2019.

Italy national basketball team – 2019 FIBA Basketball World Cup roster
Players
Coaches

Pos.	No.	Name	Age – Date of birth	Height	Club	Ctr.
SG	00	Amedeo Della Valle	26 – 11 April 1993	1.94 m (6 ft 4 in)	Olimpia Milano	(Italy)
SG	3	Marco Belinelli	33 – 25 March 1986	1.96 m (6 ft 5 in)	San Antonio Spurs	(United States)
SF	5	Alessandro Gentile	26 – 12 November 1992	2.00 m (6 ft 7 in)	Estudiantes	(Spain)
C	6	Paul Biligha	29 – 31 May 1990	2.00 m (6 ft 7 in)	Reyer Venezia	(Italy)
PG	7	Luca Vitali	33 – 9 May 1986	2.01 m (6 ft 7 in)	Brescia Leonessa	(Italy)
PF	8	Danilo Gallinari	31 – 8 August 1988	2.08 m (6 ft 10 in)	Los Angeles Clippers	(United States)
SG	10	Daniel Hackett	31 – 19 December 1987	1.98 m (6 ft 6 in)	CSKA Moscow	(Russia)
PG	12	Ariel Filloy	32 – 11 March 1987	1.90 m (6 ft 3 in)	Scandone Avellino	(Italy)
PF	15	Jeff Brooks	30 – 12 June 1989	2.03 m (6 ft 8 in)	Olimpia Milano	(Italy)
C	16	Amedeo Tessitori	24 – 7 October 1994	2.08 m (6 ft 10 in)	Universo Treviso Basket	(Italy)
SF	23	Awudu Abass	26 – 27 January 1993	2.00 m (6 ft 7 in)	Brescia Leonessa	(Italy)
SF	70	Luigi Datome (C)	31 – 23 November 1987	2.03 m (6 ft 8 in)	Fenerbahçe	(Turkey)

Head coach

- (Italy) Romeo Sacchetti

Assistant coach(es)

- (Italy) Lele Molin
- (Italy) Massimo Maffezzoli
- (Italy) Paolo Conti

Legend

- (C) Team captain
- Club – describes last
  club before the tournament
- Age – describes age
  on 31 August 2019

=== Philippines ===
The final roster was announced on 25 August 2019.

Philippines national basketball team – 2019 FIBA Basketball World Cup roster
Players
Coaches

Pos.	No.	Name	Age – Date of birth	Height	Club	Ctr.
PG	3	Paul John Dalistan	31 – February 14, 1988	6 ft 0 in (1.83 m)	Magnolia Hotshots	(Philippines)
PG	4	Kiefer Isaac Ravena	25 – October 27, 1993	6 ft 0 in (1.83 m)	NLEX Road Warriors	(Philippines)
SF	5	Gabriel Daniel Norwood (C)	34 – February 9, 1985	6 ft 6 in (1.98 m)	Rain or Shine Elasto Painters	(Philippines)
SG	8	Robert Bolick	23 – September 13, 1995	6 ft 1 in (1.85 m)	NorthPort Batang Pier	(Philippines)
C	11	Andray Blatche (NP)	33 – August 22, 1986	6 ft 11 in (2.11 m)	Tianjin Gold Lions	(China)
PG	14	Andy Mark Barroca	27 – April 25, 1992	5 ft 10 in (1.78 m)	Magnolia Hotshots	(Philippines)
C	15	June Mar Fajardo	29 – November 17, 1989	6 ft 10 in (2.08 m)	San Miguel Beermen	(Philippines)
SG	16	Roger Ray Pogoy	27 – June 16, 1992	6 ft 2 in (1.88 m)	TNT KaTropa	(Philippines)
SG	17	Christian Jaymar Perez	25 – November 17, 1993	6 ft 2 in (1.88 m)	Columbian Dyip	(Philippines)
PF	18	Jeth Troy Rosario	27 – January 20, 1992	6 ft 7 in (2.01 m)	TNT KaTropa	(Philippines)
C	20	Raymond Almazan	30 – August 2, 1989	6 ft 8 in (2.03 m)	Meralco Bolts	(Philippines)
PF	25	Japeth Paul Aguilar	32 – January 25, 1987	6 ft 9 in (2.06 m)	Barangay Ginebra San Miguel	(Philippines)

Head coach

- (Philippines) Yeng Guiao

Assistant coach(es)

- (Philippines) Ford Arao
- (Philippines) Caloy Garcia
- (Philippines) Ryan Gregorio

Legend

- (C) Team captain
- Club – describes last
  club before the tournament
- Age – describes age
  on 31 August 2019

=== Serbia ===
The final roster was announced on 29 August 2019.

Serbia national basketball team – 2019 FIBA Basketball World Cup roster
Players
Coaches

Pos.	No.	Name	Age – Date of birth	Height	Club	Ctr.
SF	5	Marko Simonović	33 – 30 May 1986	2.03 m (6 ft 8 in)	Zenit St. Petersburg	(Russia)
SG	7	Bogdan Bogdanović	27 – 18 August 1992	1.98 m (6 ft 6 in)	Sacramento Kings	(United States)
F	8	Nemanja Bjelica	31 – 9 May 1988	2.08 m (6 ft 10 in)	Sacramento Kings	(United States)
F	11	Vladimir Lučić	30 – 17 June 1989	2.03 m (6 ft 8 in)	Bayern Munich	(Germany)
C	13	Miroslav Raduljica (C)	31 – 5 January 1988	2.13 m (7 ft 0 in)	Jiangsu Dragons	(China)
PF	14	Stefan Birčević	29 – 13 December 1989	2.10 m (6 ft 11 in)	Baskets Bonn	(Germany)
PF	15	Nikola Jokić	24 – 19 February 1995	2.13 m (7 ft 0 in)	Denver Nuggets	(United States)
C	21	Nikola Milutinov	24 – 13 December 1994	2.13 m (7 ft 0 in)	Olympiacos	(Greece)
PG	22	Vasilije Micić	25 – 13 January 1994	1.97 m (6 ft 6 in)	Anadolu Efes	(Turkey)
SG	23	Marko Gudurić	24 – 8 March 1995	2.00 m (6 ft 7 in)	Fenerbahçe	(Turkey)
PG	24	Stefan Jović	28 – 3 November 1990	1.99 m (6 ft 6 in)	Bayern Munich	(Germany)
C	51	Boban Marjanović	31 – 15 August 1988	2.21 m (7 ft 3 in)	Philadelphia 76ers	(United States)

Head coach

- (Serbia) Aleksandar Đorđević

Assistant coach(es)

- (Serbia) Miroslav Nikolić
- (Serbia) Jovica Antonić
- (Serbia) Darko Rajaković

Legend

- (C) Team captain
- Club – describes last
  club before the tournament
- Age – describes age
  on 31 August 2019

== Group E ==
=== Czech Republic ===
A 12-player roster.

Czech Republic national basketball team – 2019 FIBA Basketball World Cup roster
Players
Coaches

Pos.	No.	Name	Age – Date of birth	Height	Club	Ctr.
PF	1	Patrik Auda	30 – August 28, 1989	2.06 m (6 ft 9 in)	Boulazac Basket Dordogne	(France)
PG	4	Tomáš Vyoral	26 – September 28, 1992	1.90 m (6 ft 3 in)	ČEZ Nymburk	(Czech Republic)
SF	6	Pavel Pumprla	33 – June 13, 1986	1.98 m (6 ft 6 in)	ČEZ Nymburk	(Czech Republic)
SF	7	Vojtěch Hruban	30 – August 29, 1989	2.02 m (6 ft 8 in)	ČEZ Nymburk	(Czech Republic)
PG	8	Tomáš Satoranský	27 – October 30, 1991	2.01 m (6 ft 7 in)	Chicago Bulls	(United States)
SF	11	Blake Schilb	35 – December 23, 1983	1.99 m (6 ft 6 in)	Champagne Basket	(France)
C	12	Ondřej Balvín	26 – September 20, 1992	2.17 m (7 ft 1 in)	CB Gran Canaria	(Spain)
PG	13	Jakub Šiřina	31 – November 21, 1987	1.86 m (6 ft 1 in)	Opava	(Czech Republic)
C	15	Martin Peterka	24 – January 12, 1995	2.03 m (6 ft 8 in)	ČEZ Nymburk	(Czech Republic)
SG	17	Jaromir Bohačík	27 – May 26, 1992	1.97 m (6 ft 6 in)	ČEZ Nymburk	(Czech Republic)
SF	23	Lukáš Palyza	29 – November 10, 1989	2.03 m (6 ft 8 in)	BK Olomoucko	(Czech Republic)
PF	31	Martin Kriz	26 – June 17, 1993	2.00 m (6 ft 7 in)	ČEZ Nymburk	(Czech Republic)

Head coach

- (Israel) Ronen Ginzburg

Assistant coach(es)

- (Czech Republic) Pavel Beneš
- (Czech Republic) Lubomir Ružička

Legend

- (C) Team captain
- Club – describes last
  club before the tournament
- Age – describes age
  on 31 August 2019

=== Japan ===
The Japanese team announced the 12-player final roster on 27th of August.

Japan national basketball team – 2019 FIBA Basketball World Cup roster
Players
Coaches
}

Pos.	No.	Name	Age – Date of birth	Height	Club	Ctr.
PG	3	Seiya Ando	26 – July 15, 1993	1.80 m (5 ft 11 in)	Alvark Tokyo	(Japan)
SG	6	Makoto Hiejima	29 – August 11, 1990	1.91 m (6 ft 3 in)	Utsunomiya Brex	(Japan)
PG	7	Ryusei Shinoyama (C)	31 – July 20, 1988	1.78 m (5 ft 10 in)	Kawasaki Brave Thunders	(Japan)
PF	8	Rui Hachimura	21 – February 8, 1998	2.04 m (6 ft 8 in)	Washington Wizards	(United States)
PF	10	Kosuke Takeuchi	34 – January 29, 1985	2.08 m (6 ft 10 in)	Utsunomiya Brex	(Japan)
SF	12	Yuta Watanabe	22 – October 27, 1996	2.06 m (6 ft 9 in)	Memphis Grizzlies	(United States)
SG	13	Shuto Ando	25 – June 13, 1994	1.91 m (6 ft 3 in)	Nagoya Diamond Dolphins	(Japan)
PF	15	Joji Takeuchi	34 – January 29, 1985	2.08 m (6 ft 10 in)	Alvark Tokyo	(Japan)
SF	18	Yudai Baba	23 – November 7, 1995	1.98 m (6 ft 6 in)	Alvark Tokyo	(Japan)
C	22	Nick Fazekas	34 – June 17, 1985	2.11 m (6 ft 11 in)	Kawasaki Brave Thunders	(Japan)
SG	24	Daiki Tanaka	27 – September 3, 1991	1.93 m (6 ft 4 in)	Alvark Tokyo	(Japan)
C	32	Avi Schafer	21 – January 28, 1998	2.03 m (6 ft 8 in)	Shiga Lakestars	(Japan)

Head coach

- (Argentina) Julio Lamas

Assistant coach(es)

- (Japan) Kenichi Sako
- (Argentina) Herman Julian Mandole

Legend

- (C) Team captain
- Club – describes last
  club before the tournament
- Age – describes age
  on 31 August 2019

=== Turkey ===
Turkey national basketball team - 2019 FIBA Basketball World Cup roster
Players
Coaches

Pos.	No.	Name	Age – Date of birth	Height	Club	Ctr.
PG	1	Scottie Wilbekin	26 – 5 April 1993	1.88 m (6 ft 2 in)	Maccabi Tel Aviv	(Israel)
PG	4	Doğuş Balbay	30 – 21 January 1989	1.85 m (6 ft 1 in)	Anadolu Efes	(Turkey)
SF	5	Metecan Birsen	24 – 6 April 1995	2.08 m (6 ft 10 in)	Anadolu Efes	(Turkey)
SF	6	Cedi Osman	24 – 8 April 1995	2.03 m (6 ft 8 in)	Cleveland Cavaliers	(United States)
PF	8	Ersan İlyasova	32 – 15 May 1987	2.08 m (6 ft 10 in)	Milwaukee Bucks	(United States)
C	9	Semih Erden	33 – 28 July 1986	2.13 m (7 ft 0 in)	Beşiktaş	(Turkey)
SG	10	Melih Mahmutoğlu	29 – 12 May 1990	1.91 m (6 ft 3 in)	Fenerbahçe	(Turkey)
PF	11	Ege Arar	22 – 2 September 1996	2.08 m (6 ft 10 in)	Galatasaray	(Turkey)
SG	19	Buğrahan Tuncer	26 – 23 March 1993	1.93 m (6 ft 4 in)	Anadolu Efes	(Turkey)
C	21	Sertaç Şanlı	28 – 5 August 1991	2.13 m (7 ft 0 in)	Anadolu Efes	(Turkey)
SG	22	Furkan Korkmaz	22 – 24 July 1997	2.01 m (6 ft 7 in)	Philadelphia 76ers	(United States)
SG	24	Yiğit Arslan	23 – 12 May 1996	1.94 m (6 ft 4 in)	Galatasaray	(Turkey)

Head coach

- (Turkey) Ufuk Sarıca

Assistant coach(es)

- (Turkey) Murat Bilge
- (Turkey) Arda Demirbağ
- (Turkey) Sedat Özyer
- (Turkey) Recep Şen

Legend

- (C) Team captain
- Club – describes last
  club before the tournament
- Age – describes age
  on 31 August 2019

=== United States ===
The American team announced the 12-player final roster on 24th of August.

United States national basketball team – 2019 FIBA Basketball World Cup roster
Players
Coaches

Pos.	No.	Name	Age – Date of birth	Height	Club	Ctr.
G	4	Derrick White	25 – July 2, 1994	6 ft 5 in (1.96 m)	San Antonio Spurs	(United States)
G	5	Donovan Mitchell	22 – September 7, 1996	6 ft 3 in (1.91 m)	Utah Jazz	(United States)
G	6	Joe Harris	27 – September 6, 1991	6 ft 6 in (1.98 m)	Brooklyn Nets	(United States)
G	7	Marcus Smart	25 – March 6, 1994	6 ft 4 in (1.93 m)	Boston Celtics	(United States)
F	8	Harrison Barnes	27 – May 30, 1992	6 ft 8 in (2.03 m)	Sacramento Kings	(United States)
F	9	Jaylen Brown	22 – October 24, 1996	6 ft 7 in (2.01 m)	Boston Celtics	(United States)
F	10	Jayson Tatum	21 – March 3, 1998	6 ft 8 in (2.03 m)	Boston Celtics	(United States)
C	11	Mason Plumlee	29 – March 5, 1990	6 ft 11 in (2.11 m)	Denver Nuggets	(United States)
C	12	Myles Turner	23 – March 24, 1996	6 ft 11 in (2.11 m)	Indiana Pacers	(United States)
C	13	Brook Lopez	31 – January 4, 1988	7 ft 0 in (2.13 m)	Milwaukee Bucks	(United States)
F	14	Khris Middleton	28 – August 12, 1991	6 ft 8 in (2.03 m)	Milwaukee Bucks	(United States)
G	15	Kemba Walker	29 – May 8, 1990	6 ft 1 in (1.85 m)	Charlotte Hornets	(United States)

Head coach

- (United States) Gregg Popovich

Assistant coach(es)

- (United States) Steve Kerr
- (United States) Lloyd Pierce
- (United States) Jay Wright

Legend

- (C) Team captain
- Club – describes last
  club before the tournament
- Age – as of 31 August 2019

Roster

== Group F ==
=== Brazil ===
The final roster was announced on 18 August 2019.

Brazil national basketball team – 2019 FIBA Basketball World Cup roster
Players
Coaches

Pos.	No.	Name	Age – Date of birth	Height	Club	Ctr.
PG	2	Yago dos Santos	20 – 9 March 1999	1.78 m (5 ft 10 in)	Paulistano	(Brazil)
PG	5	Rafa Luz	27 – 11 February 1992	1.88 m (6 ft 2 in)	UCAM Murcia	(Spain)
PF	6	Cristiano Felício	27 – 7 July 1992	2.08 m (6 ft 10 in)	Chicago Bulls	(United States)
SG	8	Vítor Benite	29 – 20 February 1990	1.91 m (6 ft 3 in)	San Pablo Burgos	(Spain)
PG	9	Marcelo Huertas	36 – 25 May 1983	1.91 m (6 ft 3 in)	Iberostar Tenerife	(Spain)
SF	10	Alex Garcia	39 – 4 March 1980	1.93 m (6 ft 4 in)	Minas	(Brazil)
C	11	Anderson Varejão	36 – 28 September 1982	2.11 m (6 ft 11 in)	Flamengo	(Brazil)
PF	14	Marquinhos Vieira	35 – 31 May 1984	2.06 m (6 ft 9 in)	Flamengo	(Brazil)
SG	19	Leandro Barbosa	36 – 28 November 1982	1.91 m (6 ft 3 in)	Minas	(Brazil)
C	23	Augusto Lima	27 – 17 September 1991	2.08 m (6 ft 10 in)	San Pablo Burgos	(Spain)
SF	24	Didi Louzada	20 – 2 July 1999	1.95 m (6 ft 5 in)	Sydney Kings	(Australia)
PF	50	Bruno Caboclo	23 – 20 September 1995	2.06 m (6 ft 9 in)	Memphis Grizzlies	(United States)

Head coach

- (Croatia) Aleksandar Petrović

Assistant coach(es)

- (Brazil) Cesar Guidetti
- (Brazil) Bruno Savignani

Legend

- (C) Team captain
- Club – describes last
  club before the tournament
- Age – describes age
  on 31 August 2019

=== Greece ===
The final roster was announced on 30 August 2019.

Greece national basketball team – 2019 FIBA Basketball World Cup preliminary roster
Players
Coaches

Pos.	No.	Name	Age – Date of birth	Height	Club	Ctr.
SG	5	Giannoulis Larentzakis	25 – 22 September 1993	1.96 m (6 ft 5 in)	AEK Athens	(Greece)
PG	8	Nick Calathes	30 – 7 February 1989	1.98 m (6 ft 6 in)	Panathinaikos	(Greece)
C	9	Ioannis Bourousis (C)	36 – 17 May 1983	2.15 m (7 ft 1 in)	Gran Canaria	(Spain)
SG	10	Kostas Sloukas	29 – 15 January 1990	1.90 m (6 ft 3 in)	Fenerbahçe	(Turkey)
C	14	Georgios Papagiannis	22 – 3 July 1997	2.18 m (7 ft 2 in)	Panathinaikos	(Greece)
PF	15	Georgios Printezis	34 – 22 February 1985	2.06 m (6 ft 9 in)	Olympiacos	(Greece)
SF	16	Kostas Papanikolaou	29 – 31 July 1990	2.04 m (6 ft 8 in)	Olympiacos	(Greece)
PG	17	Vangelis Mantzaris	29 – 16 April 1990	1.96 m (6 ft 5 in)	UNICS Kazan	(Russia)
SF	19	Ioannis Papapetrou	25 – 30 March 1994	2.06 m (6 ft 9 in)	Panathinaikos	(Greece)
PF	21	Panagiotis Vasilopoulos	35 – 8 February 1984	2.05 m (6 ft 9 in)	Peristeri	(Greece)
PF	34	Giannis Antetokounmpo	24 – 6 December 1994	2.11 m (6 ft 11 in)	Milwaukee Bucks	(United States)
SF	43	Thanasis Antetokounmpo	27 – 18 July 1992	2.01 m (6 ft 7 in)	Milwaukee Bucks	(United States)

Head coach

- (Greece) Thanasis Skourtopoulos

Assistant coach(es)

- (Greece) Giannis Eleutheriadis
- (Greece) Thanasis Molivdas
- (Greece) Giannis Kalampokis

Legend

- (C) - Team captain
- Club – describes last
  club before the tournament
- Age – describes age
  on 31 August 2019

=== Montenegro ===
Final roster

Montenegro national basketball team – 2019 FIBA Basketball World Cup roster
Players
Coaches

Pos.	No.	Name	Age – Date of birth	Height	Club	Ctr.
C	4	Nikola Vučević	28 – 24 October 1990	2.13 m (7 ft 0 in)	Orlando Magic	(United States)
PG	5	Derek Needham	28 – 20 October 1990	1.80 m (5 ft 11 in)	Mornar	(Montenegro)
SF	6	Suad Šehović	32 – 19 February 1987	1.97 m (6 ft 6 in)	Budućnost	(Montenegro)
PF	7	Nemanja Radović	27 – 11 November 1991	2.08 m (6 ft 10 in)	Zaragoza	(Spain)
SG	8	Sead Šehović	30 – 22 August 1989	1.96 m (6 ft 5 in)	Mornar	(Montenegro)
SG	10	Aleksa Popović	32 – 31 July 1987	2.01 m (6 ft 7 in)	Lovćen	(Montenegro)
C	11	Marko Todorović	27 – 19 April 1992	2.11 m (6 ft 11 in)	Joventut	(Spain)
PF	14	Bojan Dubljević	27 – 24 October 1991	2.05 m (6 ft 9 in)	Valencia	(Spain)
PG	20	Nikola Ivanović	25 – 19 February 1994	1.90 m (6 ft 3 in)	Budućnost	(Montenegro)
SF	23	Dino Radončić	20 – 8 January 1999	2.03 m (6 ft 8 in)	UCAM Murcia	(Spain)
SG	30	Petar Popović	22 – 13 September 1996	1.92 m (6 ft 4 in)	Budućnost	(Montenegro)
PF	51	Milko Bjelica	35 – 4 June 1984	2.07 m (6 ft 9 in)	Mornar	(Montenegro)

Head coach

- (Montenegro) Zvezdan Mitrović

Assistant coach(es)

- (Montenegro) Boško Radović
- (Montenegro) Dušan Dubljević
- (Montenegro) Milovan Ljubojević

Legend

- (C) Team captain
- Club – describes last
  club before the tournament
- Age – describes age
  on 31 August 2019

=== New Zealand ===
The final roster was announced on 21 August 2019.

New Zealand national basketball team – 2019 FIBA Basketball World Cup roster
Players
Coaches

Pos.	No.	Name	Age – Date of birth	Height	Club	Ctr.
G	0	Tai Webster	24 – 29 May 1995	1.93 m (6 ft 4 in)	Galatasaray	(Turkey)
F	3	Finn Delany	24 – August 12, 1995	2.00 m (6 ft 7 in)	New Zealand Breakers	(New Zealand)
PG	5	Shea Ili	26 – October 6, 1992	1.83 m (6 ft 0 in)	Melbourne United	(Australia)
PG	6	Jarrod Kenny	33 – 17 September 1985	1.86 m (6 ft 1 in)	Cairns Taipans	(Australia)
SG	9	Corey Webster (C)	30 – 29 November 1988	1.86 m (6 ft 1 in)	New Zealand Breakers	(New Zealand)
SF	10	Thomas Abercrombie	32 – 5 July 1987	1.98 m (6 ft 6 in)	New Zealand Breakers	(New Zealand)
C	14	Robert Loe	28 – 5 August 1991	2.11 m (6 ft 11 in)	New Zealand Breakers	(New Zealand)
PF	16	Tohi Smith-Milner	23 – October 6, 1995	2.05 m (6 ft 9 in)	Melbourne United	(Australia)
SF	20	Jordan Ngatai	26 – March 7, 1993	1.95 m (6 ft 5 in)	New Zealand Breakers	(New Zealand)
SG	25	Ethan Rusbatch	27 – 4 May 1992	1.96 m (6 ft 5 in)	Hawke's Bay Hawks	(New Zealand)
C	35	Alex Pledger	32 – March 27, 1987	2.15 m (7 ft 1 in)	Melbourne United	(Australia)
PF	42	Isaac Fotu	25 – 18 December 1993	2.03 m (6 ft 8 in)	Universo Treviso Basket	(Italy)

Head coach

- (New Zealand) Paul Henare

Assistant coach(es)

- (New Zealand) Pero Cameron
- (New Zealand) Ross McMains

Legend

- (C) Team captain
- Club – describes last
  club before the tournament
- Age – describes age
  on 31 August 2019

== Group G ==
=== Dominican Republic ===
Final roster for the 2019 FIBA Basketball World Cup.

Dominican Republic national basketball team – 2019 FIBA Basketball World Cup roster
Players
Coaches

Pos.	No.	Name	Age – Date of birth	Height	Club	Ctr.
SF	1	Dagoberto Peña	31 – June 14, 1988	6 ft 6 in (1.98 m)	Breogán	(Spain)
SG	2	Rigoberto Mendoza	27 – July 6, 1992	6 ft 3 in (1.91 m)	Santeros de Aguada	(Puerto Rico)
PG	5	Víctor Liz	32 – December 5, 1986	6 ft 0 in (1.83 m)	Leones de Ponce	(Puerto Rico)
SG	7	Sadiel Rojas	30 – July 16, 1989	6 ft 4 in (1.93 m)	UCAM Murcia	(Spain)
SF	9	Juan Miguel Suero	26 – May 11, 1993	6 ft 5 in (1.96 m)	Mauricio Báez	(Dominican Republic)
C	11	Eloy Vargas	30 – December 30, 1988	6 ft 11 in (2.11 m)	Trotamundos	(Venezuela)
PF	13	Eulis Báez	37 – March 18, 1982	6 ft 6 in (1.98 m)	Manresa	(Spain)
PG	14	Ronald Ramón	33 – January 14, 1986	6 ft 0 in (1.83 m)	Mauricio Báez	(Dominican Republic)
PG	24	Gelvis Solano	25 – June 1, 1994	6 ft 1 in (1.85 m)	Olimpico LB	(Argentina)
C	33	Ronald Roberts	28 – August 5, 1991	6 ft 8 in (2.03 m)	Elan Chalonnais	(France)
PF	41	Juan Jose García	30 – April 22, 1989	6 ft 7 in (2.01 m)	TAU Castelló	(Spain)
SF	44	Luis David Montero	26 – April 6, 1993	6 ft 7 in (2.01 m)	Cocodrilos	(Venezuela)

Head coach

- (Argentina) Nestor Garcia

Assistant coach(es)

- (Dominican Republic) Melvyn Lopez
- (United States) Tony Stubblefield

Legend

- (C) Team captain
- Club – describes last
  club before the tournament
- Age – describes age
  on 31 August 2019

=== France ===
The final roster was announced on 27 August 2019.

France national basketball team – 2019 FIBA Basketball World Cup roster
Players
Coaches

Pos.	No.	Name	Age – Date of birth	Height	Club	Ctr.
PG	1	Frank Ntilikina	21 – July 28, 1998	2.01 m (6 ft 7 in)	New York Knicks	(United States)
PF	2	Amath M'Baye	29 – December 14, 1989	2.09 m (6 ft 10 in)	Pınar Karşıyaka	(Turkey)
SF	5	Nicolas Batum	30 – December 14, 1988	2.04 m (6 ft 8 in)	Charlotte Hornets	(United States)
SG	10	Evan Fournier	26 – October 29, 1992	2.01 m (6 ft 7 in)	Orlando Magic	(United States)
PG	12	Nando de Colo	32 – June 23, 1987	1.96 m (6 ft 5 in)	Fenerbahçe	(Turkey)
C	17	Vincent Poirier	25 – October 27, 1993	2.11 m (6 ft 11 in)	Boston Celtics	(United States)
PG	21	Andrew Albicy	29 – March 21, 1990	1.78 m (5 ft 10 in)	Zenit Saint Petersburg	(Russia)
PF	25	Louis Labeyrie	27 – February 11, 1992	2.10 m (6 ft 11 in)	Valencia Basket	(Spain)
C	26	Mathias Lessort	23 – September 29, 1995	2.08 m (6 ft 10 in)	Bayern Munich	(Germany)
C	27	Rudy Gobert	27 – June 26, 1992	2.19 m (7 ft 2 in)	Utah Jazz	(United States)
SF	33	Axel Toupane	27 – July 23, 1992	2.03 m (6 ft 8 in)	Unicaja	(Spain)
SG	90	Paul Lacombe	29 – June 12, 1990	1.91 m (6 ft 3 in)	AS Monaco	(France)

Head coach

- (France) Vincent Collet

Assistant coach(es)

- (France) Pascal Donnadieu
- (France) Laurent Foirest
- (France) Ruddy Nelhomme

Legend

- (C) Team captain
- Club – describes last
  club before the tournament
- Age – describes age
  on 31 August 2019

=== Germany ===
Official 2019 World Cup roster

Germany national basketball team – 2019 FIBA Basketball World Cup roster
Players
Coaches

Pos.	No.	Name	Age – Date of birth	Height	Club	Ctr.
PG	4	Maodo Lô	27 – 12 March 1992	1.91 m (6 ft 3 in)	Bayern Munich	(Germany)
SF	5	Niels Giffey	28 – 8 June 1991	2.01 m (6 ft 7 in)	Alba Berlin	(Germany)
C	7	Johannes Voigtmann	26 – 30 September 1992	2.11 m (6 ft 11 in)	CSKA Moscow	(Russia)
PG	8	İsmet Akpınar	24 – 22 May 1995	1.91 m (6 ft 3 in)	Beşiktaş Istanbul	(Turkey)
PF	10	Daniel Theis	27 – 4 April 1992	2.03 m (6 ft 8 in)	Boston Celtics	(United States)
SF	12	Robin Benzing (C)	30 – 25 January 1989	2.08 m (6 ft 10 in)	CAI Zaragoza	(Spain)
PG	17	Dennis Schröder	25 – 15 September 1993	1.85 m (6 ft 1 in)	Los Angeles Lakers	(United States)
SF	21	Paul Zipser	25 – 18 February 1994	2.07 m (6 ft 9 in)	Bayern Munich	(Germany)
PF	22	Danilo Barthel	27 – 24 October 1991	2.08 m (6 ft 10 in)	Bayern Munich	(Germany)
C	24	Maximilian Kleber	27 – 21 January 1992	2.11 m (6 ft 11 in)	Dallas Mavericks	(United States)
PF	32	Johannes Thiemann	25 – 9 February 1994	2.08 m (6 ft 10 in)	Alba Berlin	(Germany)
SG	42	Andreas Obst	23 – 13 July 1996	1.91 m (6 ft 3 in)	Ulm	(Germany)

Head coach

- (Germany) Henrik Rödl

Legend

- (C) Team captain
- Club – describes last
  club before the tournament
- Age – describes age
  on 31 August 2019

=== Jordan ===
Latest Roster

Jordan national basketball team – 2019 FIBA Basketball World Cup roster
Players
Coaches

Pos.	No.	Name	Age – Date of birth	Height	Club	Ctr.
PG	0	Mahmoud Abdeen	31 – December 23, 1987	1.90 m (6 ft 3 in)	Al-Wehdat SC	(Jordan)
SG	1	Amin Abu Hawwas	25 – April 26, 1994	1.90 m (6 ft 3 in)	Orthodox (Jordan)	(Jordan)
SF	2	Dar Tucker (NP)	31 – April 11, 1988	1.93 m (6 ft 4 in)	San Lorenzo	(Argentina)
PG	4	Jordan Dasuqi	24 – November 29, 1994	1.80 m (5 ft 11 in)	Al-Jazeera SC (Amman)	(Jordan)
SG	5	Freddy Ibrahim	23 – January 26, 1996	1.90 m (6 ft 3 in)	Orthodox (Jordan)	(Jordan)
SF	7	Ahmad Al-Hamarsheh	32 – October 10, 1986	1.97 m (6 ft 6 in)	Al-Wehdat SC	(Jordan)
PF	12	Yousef Abuwazaneh	25 – December 6, 1993	2.01 m (6 ft 7 in)	Al-Riyadi Amman	(Jordan)
C	13	Mohammad Hussein	29 – March 3, 1990	2.08 m (6 ft 10 in)	Al-Ahli SC (Amman)	(Jordan)
PF	15	Zaid Abbas	35 – November 21, 1983	2.03 m (6 ft 8 in)	Al-Ahli Club (Manama)	(Bahrain)
SF	22	Ahmad Obeid	29 – August 24, 1990	1.98 m (6 ft 6 in)	Orthodox (Jordan)	(Jordan)
SF	23	Mousa Al-Awadi	34 – July 20, 1985	1.93 m (6 ft 4 in)	Kofer Yoba Irbid	(Jordan)
C	44	Ahmet Düverioğlu	26 – March 4, 1993	2.13 m (7 ft 0 in)	Fenerbahçe	(Turkey)

Head coach

- (United States) Joseph Anthony Stiebing

Assistant coach(es)

- (Jordan) Zaid AlKhas

Legend

- (C) Team captain
- (NP) Naturalized player
- Club – describes last
  club before the tournament
- Age – describes age
  on 31 August 2019

== Group H ==
=== Australia ===
The final roster was announced on 7 August 2019.

Australia national basketball team – 2019 FIBA Basketball World Cup roster
Players
Coaches

Pos.	No.	Name	Age – Date of birth	Height	Club	Ctr.
PG	2	Nathan Sobey	29 – July 14, 1990	1.88 m (6 ft 2 in)	Brisbane Bullets	(Australia)
SG	3	Cameron Gliddon	30 – August 16, 1989	1.97 m (6 ft 6 in)	Brisbane Bullets	(Australia)
SG	4	Chris Goulding	30 – October 24, 1988	1.92 m (6 ft 4 in)	Melbourne United	(Australia)
G	5	Patty Mills	31 – August 11, 1988	1.83 m (6 ft 0 in)	San Antonio Spurs	(United States)
C	6	Andrew Bogut	34 – November 28, 1984	2.13 m (7 ft 0 in)	Sydney Kings	(Australia)
SF	7	Joe Ingles	31 – October 2, 1987	2.03 m (6 ft 8 in)	Utah Jazz	(United States)
PG	8	Matthew Dellavedova	28 – September 8, 1990	1.92 m (6 ft 4 in)	Cleveland Cavaliers	(United States)
PF	11	Nick Kay	27 – August 3, 1992	2.06 m (6 ft 9 in)	Perth Wildcats	(Australia)
C	12	Aron Baynes	32 – December 9, 1986	2.08 m (6 ft 10 in)	Phoenix Suns	(United States)
F	20	David Barlow	35 – October 22, 1983	2.03 m (6 ft 8 in)	Melbourne United	(Australia)
PF	34	Jock Landale	23 – October 25, 1995	2.11 m (6 ft 11 in)	Žalgiris Kaunas	(Lithuania)
SF	55	Mitch Creek	27 – April 27, 1992	1.96 m (6 ft 5 in)	South East Melbourne Phoenix	(Australia)

Head coach

- (Australia) Andrej Lemanis

Assistant coach(es)

- (Australia) Luc Longley
- (Australia) Adam Caporn
- (Australia) David Patrick
- (United States) Will Weaver

Legend

- (C) Team captain
- Club – describes last
  club before the tournament
- Age – describes age
  on 31 August 2019

=== Canada ===
A 12-player final roster was named on 30 August.

Canada National Basketball Team – FIBA World Cup roster
Players
Coaches

Pos.	No.	Name	Age – Date of birth	Height	Club	Ctr.
PG	1	Kevin Pangos	26 – January 26, 1993	6 ft 2 in (1.88 m)	FC Barcelona	(Spain)
SF	3	Melvin Ejim	28 – March 4, 1991	6 ft 6 in (1.98 m)	Unicaja Málaga	(Spain)
SG	4	Brady Heslip	29 – June 19, 1990	6 ft 2 in (1.88 m)	Istanbul BB	(Turkey)
PG	6	Cory Joseph	28 – August 20, 1991	6 ft 3 in (1.91 m)	Sacramento Kings	(United States)
PG	10	Kaza Kajami-Keane	25 – January 27, 1994	6 ft 2 in (1.88 m)	Mitteldeutscher BC	(Germany)
PG	11	Andrew Nembhard	19 – January 16, 2000	6 ft 5 in (1.96 m)	Florida Gators	(United States)
PF	13	Conor Morgan	25 – August 3, 1994	6 ft 9 in (2.06 m)	Joventut Badalona	(Spain)
PF	17	Owen Klassen	27 – October 31, 1991	6 ft 10 in (2.08 m)	Telenet Giants Antwerp	(Belgium)
SF	21	Thomas Scrubb	27 – September 26, 1991	6 ft 7 in (2.01 m)	SIG Strasbourg	(France)
PG	23	Phil Scrubb	26 – November 27, 1992	6 ft 4 in (1.93 m)	Movistar Estudiantes	(Spain)
C	24	Khem Birch	26 – September 28, 1992	6 ft 9 in (2.06 m)	Orlando Magic	(United States)
PF	33	Kyle Wiltjer	26 – October 20, 1992	6 ft 10 in (2.08 m)	Türk Telekom	(Turkey)

Head coach

- (United States) Nick Nurse

Assistant coach(es)

- (Canada) Gordon Herbert

Legend

- (C) Team captain
- (NP) Naturalized player
- Club – describes last
  club before the tournament
- Age – describes age
  on 31 August 2019

=== Lithuania ===
The final roster was announced on 27 August 2019.

Lithuania national basketball team – 2019 FIBA Basketball World Cup final roster
Players
Coaches

Pos.	No.	Name	Age – Date of birth	Height	Club	Ctr.
PG	5	Mantas Kalnietis (C)	32 – September 6, 1986	1.96 m (6 ft 5 in)	ASVEL	(France)
SF	8	Jonas Mačiulis	34 – February 10, 1985	1.98 m (6 ft 6 in)	AEK Athens	(Greece)
SG	10	Renaldas Seibutis	34 – July 23, 1985	1.96 m (6 ft 5 in)	Zaragoza	(Spain)
C	11	Domantas Sabonis	23 – May 3, 1996	2.11 m (6 ft 11 in)	Indiana Pacers	(United States)
PF	13	Paulius Jankūnas	35 – April 29, 1984	2.05 m (6 ft 9 in)	Žalgiris Kaunas	(Lithuania)
C	17	Jonas Valančiūnas	27 – May 6, 1992	2.13 m (7 ft 0 in)	Memphis Grizzlies	(United States)
PF	19	Mindaugas Kuzminskas	29 – October 19, 1989	2.06 m (6 ft 9 in)	Olimpia Milano	(Italy)
SG	31	Rokas Giedraitis	27 – August 16, 1992	2.00 m (6 ft 7 in)	Alba Berlin	(Germany)
SG	40	Marius Grigonis	25 – April 26, 1994	1.98 m (6 ft 6 in)	Žalgiris Kaunas	(Lithuania)
PG	43	Lukas Lekavičius	25 – March 30, 1994	1.81 m (5 ft 11 in)	Panathinaikos	(Greece)
SF	51	Arnas Butkevičius	26 – October 10, 1992	1.97 m (6 ft 6 in)	Rytas Vilnius	(Lithuania)
SF	92	Edgaras Ulanovas	27 – January 7, 1992	1.98 m (6 ft 6 in)	Žalgiris Kaunas	(Lithuania)

Head coach

- (Lithuania) Dainius Adomaitis

Assistant coach(es)

- (Lithuania) Ramūnas Šiškauskas
- (Lithuania) Benas Matkevičius

Legend

- (C) Team captain
- Club – describes last
  club before the tournament
- Age – describes age
  on 31 August 2019

=== Senegal ===
The final roster was announced on 16 August 2019.

Senegal national basketball team – 2019 FIBA Basketball World Cup roster
Players
Coaches

Pos.	No.	Name	Age – Date of birth	Height	Club	Ctr.
SF	1	Maurice Ndour	27 – June 18, 1992	2.06 m (6 ft 9 in)	Valencia Basket	(Spain)
PF	2	Djibril Thiam	33 – July 6, 1986	2.06 m (6 ft 9 in)	Étoile Charleville-Mézières	(France)
PG	5	Xane D'Almeida	36 – January 21, 1983	1.83 m (6 ft 0 in)	Étoile Charleville-Mézières	(France)
PF	7	Pape Moustapha Diop	23 – January 1, 1996	2.07 m (6 ft 9 in)	BC Tallinna Kalev	(Estonia)
PG	10	Lamine Sambe	29 – December 15, 1989	1.96 m (6 ft 5 in)	ADA Blois Basket 41	(France)
PF	11	Mouhammad Faye	33 – September 14, 1985	2.08 m (6 ft 10 in)	Crvena Zvezda	(Serbia)
C	13	Hamady N'Diaye	32 – January 12, 1987	2.13 m (7 ft 0 in)	BCM Gravelines-Dunkerque	(France)
C	15	Youssou Ndoye	28 – July 15, 1991	2.13 m (7 ft 0 in)	JL Bourg	(France)
SG	25	Momar Ndoye	24 – July 13, 1995	2.01 m (6 ft 7 in)	JA Vichy-Clermont	(France)
SF	28	Ibrahima Fall Faye	22 – January 10, 1997	2.06 m (6 ft 9 in)	Antwerp Giants	(Belgium)
SG	31	Babacar Touré	33 – November 14, 1985	2.05 m (6 ft 9 in)	Fribourg Olympic	(Switzerland)
C	35	Makhtar Gueye	22 – January 7, 1997	2.08 m (6 ft 10 in)	UAB Blazers	(United States)

Head coach

- (Senegal) Moustapha Gaye

Assistant coach(es)

- (Senegal) Dame Diouf

Legend

- (C) Team captain
- Club – describes last
  club before the tournament
- Age – describes age
  on 31 August 2019

== Statistics ==
=== Player representation by league system ===
League systems with 15 or more players represented are listed. In all, World Cup squad members played for clubs in 37 countries.

Country	Players	Percentage	Outside national squad players
(Europe) Euroleague Basketball ^{a}	65	16.93%	10
USA/Canada (Includes NCAA)	61	15.89%	46
Spain	47	12.24%	39
France/Monaco	27	7.03%	26
VTB United League ^{b}	22	5.73%	10
Turkey	20	5.21%	12
Australia/New Zealand	18	4.69%	1
China	17	4.43%	5
Others	172	44.79%	
Total	384	100%	

^{a} As the Euroleague is a multinational league and all competing teams (excluding Olympiacos) compete in their domestic leagues, the total percentage will be over 100 because of duplications.
^{b} The VTB United League is Russia's main system, but teams from neighbouring nations are invited to enter.

- The Chinese, Russian, South Korean and American squads are made up entirely of players from the country's domestic league.
- The Ivorian squad has the most players from a single foreign federation, with nine players employed in France.
- Of the countries not represented by a national team at the World Cup, Israel's league provides the most squad members.
- Three squads (Canada, Senegal and Serbia) are made up entirely of players employed by overseas clubs.

=== Player representation by club ===
Clubs with six or more players represented are listed.

Club	Players
(Germany) Bayern Munich	6
(United States) Boston Celtics	6
(Spain) CB Gran Canaria	6
(Czech Republic) ČEZ Nymburk	6
(Russia) CSKA Moscow	6
(Angola) Petro de Luanda	6
