= Eualus cranchii =

Scientific classification
- Kingdom: Animalia
- Phylum: Arthropoda
- Class: Malacostraca
- Order: Decapoda
- Suborder: Pleocyemata
- Infraorder: Caridea
- Family: Thoridae
- Genus: Eualus
- Species: E. cranchii

Binomial name
- Eualus cranchii Leach, 1817

Synonyms
- Cancer dorsioculatus Nardo, 1847; Hippolyte bunseni Neumann, 1878; Hippolyte cranchii Leach, 1817; Hippolyte crassicornis H. Milne Edwards, 1837; Hippolyte lovenii Rathke, 1843; Hippolyte mutila Krøyer, 1841; Hippolyte yarrellii Thompson, 1853; Palemon microramphos Risso, 1816; Spirontocaris cranchi (Leach, 1817); Thoralus cranchii (Leach, 1817); Vianellia dorsioculata Nardo, 1847

Species of shrimp

Eualus cranchii is a species of broken-backed shrimp in the family Thoridae. It is named for John Cranch (1785–1816).

== Description ==
A prawn/shrimp of up to 12 mm (0.47 in) in length for males, and 22 mm (0.87 in) in length for females.

It can be distinguished from other Eualus by:

- the carpus of the second pereiopod is in six segments
- the mandibular palp is absent
- There are epipods on the first two pereiopods

== Habitat ==
Eualus cranchii is found in shallow waters throughout the Atlantic and Mediterranean.
