= Lebbeus clarehannah =

Scientific classification
- Kingdom: Animalia
- Phylum: Arthropoda
- Clade: Pancrustacea
- Class: Malacostraca
- Order: Decapoda
- Suborder: Pleocyemata
- Infraorder: Caridea
- Family: Thoridae
- Genus: Lebbeus
- Species: L. clarehannah

Binomial name
- Lebbeus clarehannah McCallum & Poore, 2010

Species of crustacean

Lebbeus clarehannah is a species of shrimp discovered in 2005 off the southwest coast of Western Australia. Former NBA player Luc Longley won the rights to name the shrimp in an eBay auction. He named the shrimp after his daughter, Clare Hanna Longley, as a birthday present to her.
