= P. kishinouyei =

P. kishinouyei may refer to:

- Paraspirontocaris kishinouyei, a synonym for Birulia kishinouyei, a shrimp species
- Plestiodon kishinouyei, a synonym for Eumeces kishinouyei, the Kishinoue's giant skink, a lizard species found only in Japan

== See also ==
- Kishinouyei (disambiguation)
