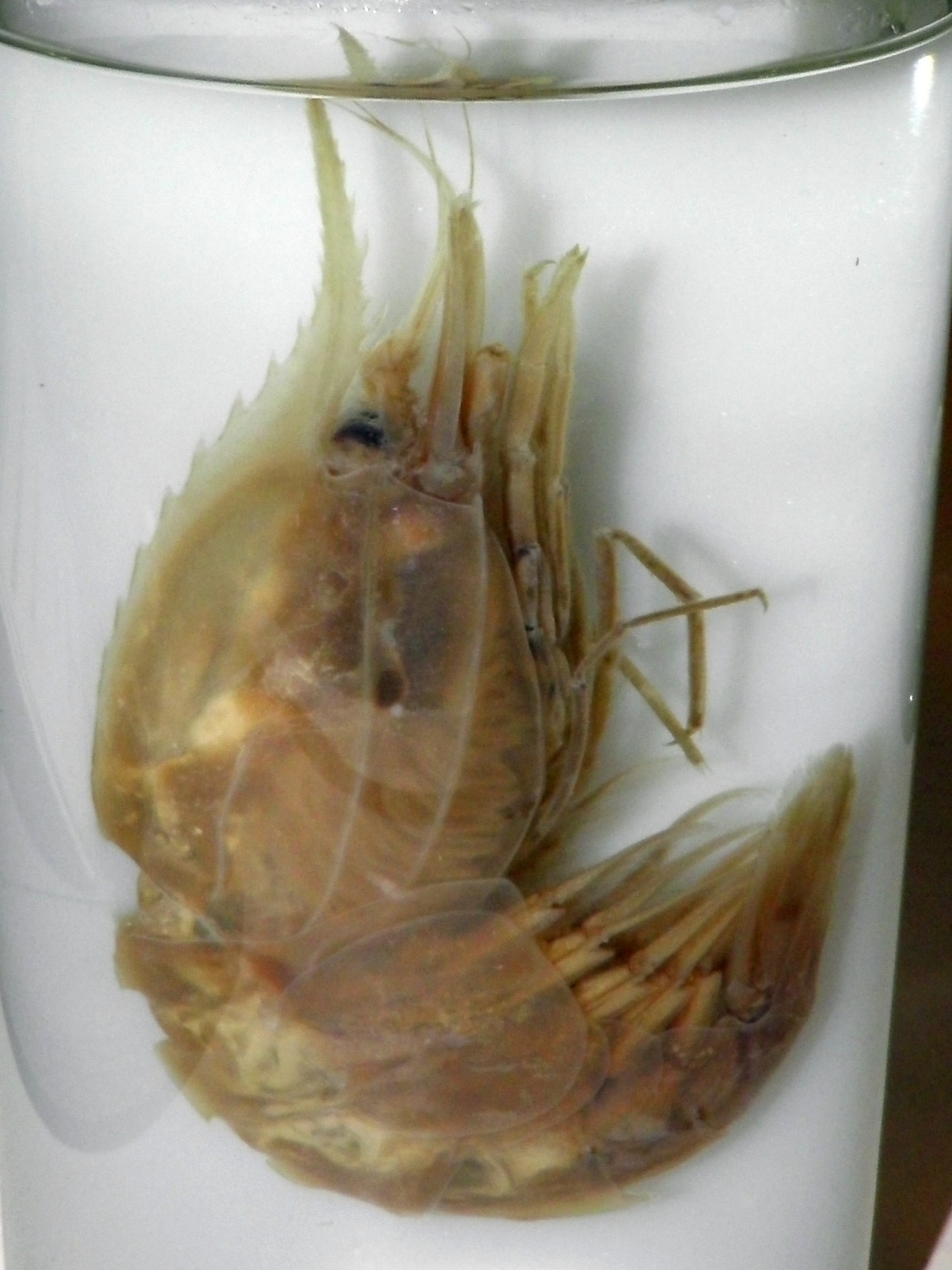

Scientific classification
- Domain: Eukaryota
- Kingdom: Animalia
- Phylum: Arthropoda
- Class: Malacostraca
- Order: Decapoda
- Suborder: Pleocyemata
- Infraorder: Caridea
- Family: Thoridae
- Genus: Lebbeus
- Species: L. groenlandicus

Binomial name
- Lebbeus groenlandicus Fabricius, 1775

= Lebbeus groenlandicus =

Species of crustacean

The spiny lobster (Lebbeus groenlandicus), also known as the chicken prawn and dokdo shrimp, is a crustacean belonging to the family Hippolytidae. It has a circumboreal distribution. It is found in South Korea on the east coast north of Pohang, Gyeongsangbuk-do, and in Japan from San'in to Hokkaido.
