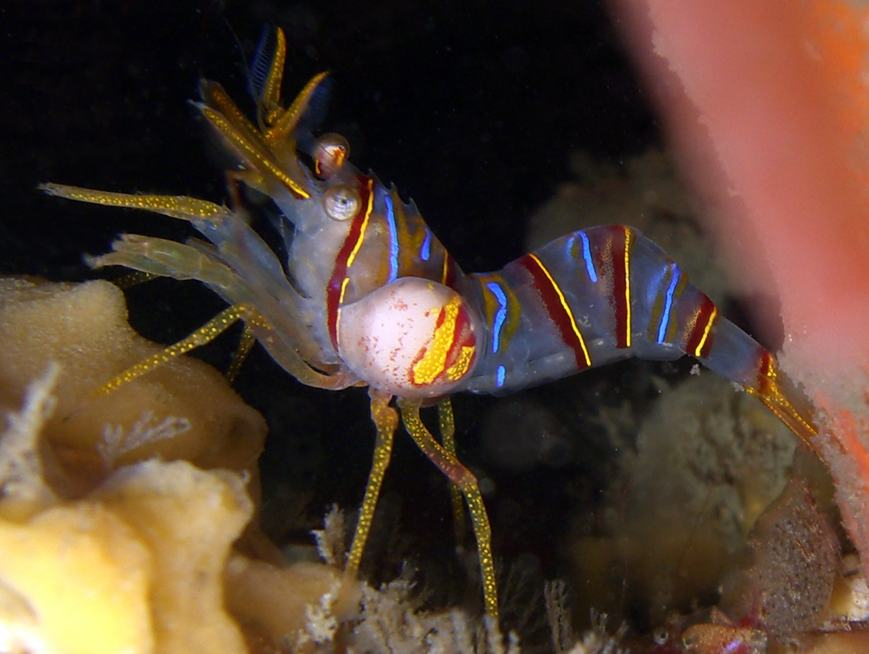
- Lebbeus grandimanus

Scientific classification
- Kingdom: Animalia
- Phylum: Arthropoda
- Clade: Pancrustacea
- Class: Malacostraca
- Order: Decapoda
- Suborder: Pleocyemata
- Infraorder: Caridea
- Family: Thoridae
- Genus: Lebbeus; White, 1847

Type species
- Lebbeus orthorhynchus (Leach mss) White, 1847

= Lebbeus =

Genus of crustaceans

Lebbeus is a genus of shrimp in the family Thoridae. It includes a species whose name was auctioned in 2009 to raise funds for conservation; Luc Longley won with a bid of A$3,600. He named the shrimp Lebbeus clarehannah. The following species are included:

- Lebbeus acudactylus Jensen, 2006
- Lebbeus africanus Fransen, 1997
- Lebbeus antarcticus (Hale, 1941)
- Lebbeus balssi Hayashi, 1992
- Lebbeus bidentatus Zarenkov, 1976
- Lebbeus brandti (Bražnikov, 1907)
- Lebbeus carinatus Zarenkov, 1976
- Lebbeus catalepsis Jensen, 1987
- Lebbeus clarehannah McCallum & Poore, 2010
- Lebbeus comanthi Hayashi & Okuno, 1997
- Lebbeus compressus Holthuis, 1947a
- Lebbeus cristagalli McCallum & Poore, 2010
- Lebbeus cristatus Ahyong, 2010
- Lebbeus curvirostris Zarenkov, 1976
- Lebbeus elegans Komai, Hayashi & Kohtsuka, 2004
- Lebbeus eludus Jensen, 2006
- Lebbeus fasciatus (Kobyakova, 1936)
- Lebbeus grandimanus (Bražnikov, 1907)
- Lebbeus groenlandicus (J. C. Fabricius, 1775)
- Lebbeus heterochaelus (Kobyakova, 1936)
- Lebbeus indicus Holthuis, 1947a
- Lebbeus kuboi Hayashi, 1992
- Lebbeus laevirostris Crosnier, 1999
- Lebbeus lagunae (Schmitt, 1921)
- Lebbeus laurentae Wicksten, 2010
- Lebbeus longidactylus (Kobyakova, 1936)
- Lebbeus longipes (Kobyakova, 1936)
- Lebbeus manus Komai & Collins, 2009
- Lebbeus microceros (Krøyer, 1841)
- Lebbeus miyakei Hayashi, 1992
- Lebbeus mundus Jensen, 2006
- Lebbeus nudirostris Komai & Takeda, 2004
- Lebbeus quadratus Chan & Komai, 2017
- Lebbeus polaris (Sabine, 1824)
- Lebbeus polyacanthus Komai, Hayashi & Kohtsuka, 2004
- Lebbeus profundus (Rathbun, 1906)
- Lebbeus rubrodentatus Bruce, 2010
- Lebbeus saldanhae (Barnard, 1947)
- Lebbeus schrencki (Bražnikov, 1907)
- Lebbeus scrippsi Wicksten & G. Méndez, 1982
- Lebbeus similior Komai & Komatsu, 2009
- Lebbeus speciosus (Urita, 1942)
- Lebbeus spinirostris (Kobyakova, 1936)
- Lebbeus splendidus Wicksten & G. Méndez, 1982
- Lebbeus spongiaris Komai, 2001
- Lebbeus tosaensis Hanamura & Abe, 2003
- Lebbeus unalaskensis (Rathbun, 1902)
- Lebbeus ushakovi (Kobyakova, 1936)
- Lebbeus vicinus (Rathbun, 1902a)
- Lebbeus vinogradowi Zarenkov, 1960
- Lebbeus virentova Nye et al., 2012
- Lebbeus washingtonianus (Rathbun, 1902)
- Lebbeus wera Ahyong, 2009
- Lebbeus yaldwyni Kensley, Tranter & Griffin, 1987
