= Birulia =

Scientific classification
- Domain: Eukaryota
- Kingdom: Animalia
- Phylum: Arthropoda
- Class: Malacostraca
- Order: Decapoda
- Suborder: Pleocyemata
- Infraorder: Caridea
- Family: Thoridae
- Genus: Birulia; Bražnikov, 1903

Species
- Birulia kishinouyei (Yokoya, 1930); Birulia sachalinensis Bražnikov, 1903

Synonyms
- Paraspirontocaris

Genus of crustaceans

Birulia is a genus of shrimp in the family Thoridae. It was formerly considered to be part of the family Hippolytidae.
