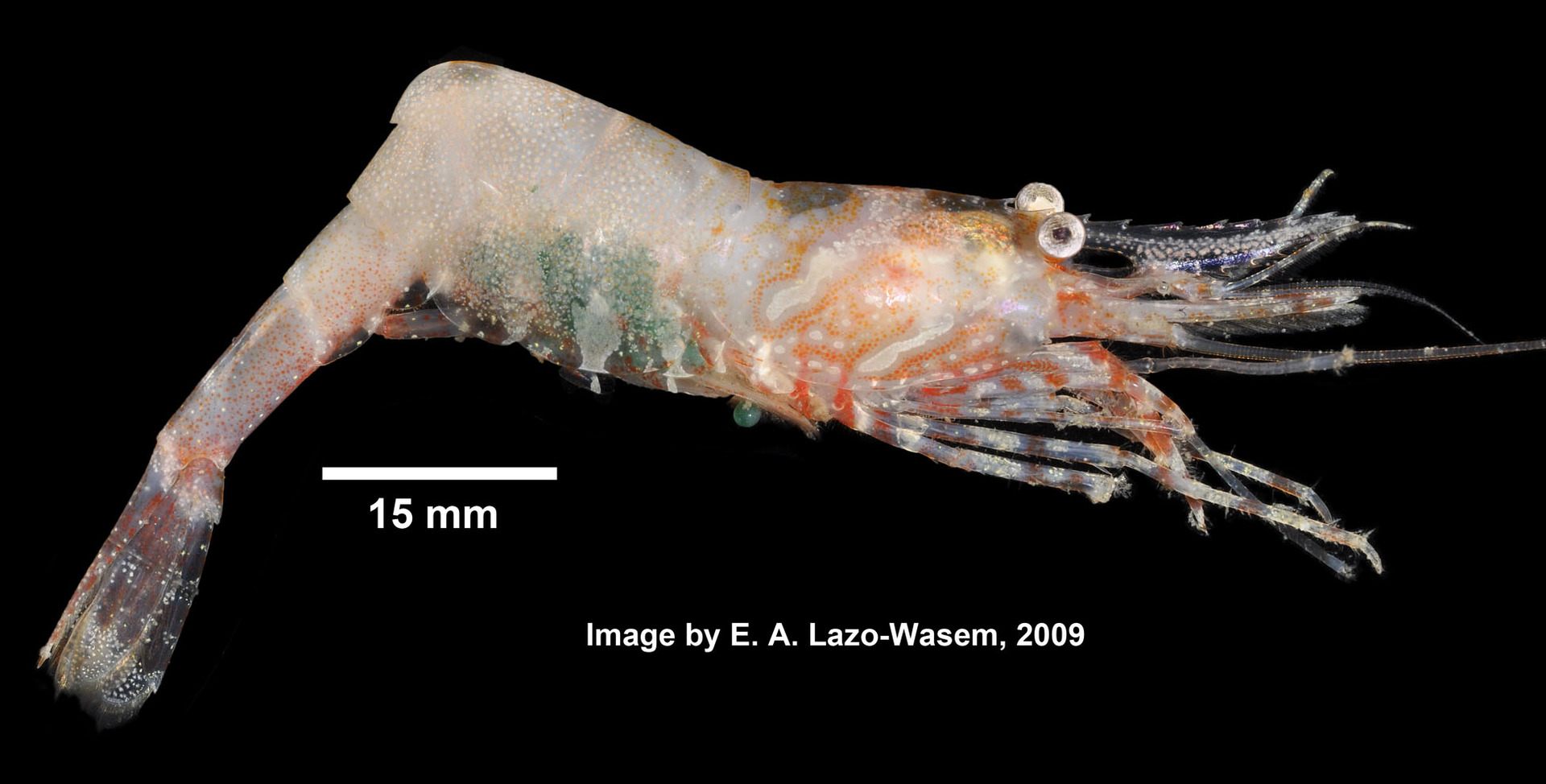
- Eualus sp. from the Southern Ocean

Scientific classification
- Domain: Eukaryota
- Kingdom: Animalia
- Phylum: Arthropoda
- Class: Malacostraca
- Order: Decapoda
- Suborder: Pleocyemata
- Infraorder: Caridea
- Family: Thoridae
- Genus: Eualus; Thallwitz, 1891

Species
- See text.

Synonyms
- Helia Thallwitz, 1891; Lysippe Kinahan, 1858; Spirontocarella Bražnikov, 1907; Thoralus Holthuis, 1947; Vianellia Nardo, 1847

= Eualus =

Genus of crustaceans

Eualus is a genus of cleaner shrimp.

== Genera ==
The following species are recognised in the genus Eualus:

- Eualus amandae Nye, Copley & Linse, 2013
- Eualus avinus (Rathbun, 1899)
- Eualus barbatus (Rathbun, 1899)
- Eualus belcheri (Bell, 1855)
- Eualus berkeleyorum Butler, 1971
- Eualus biunguis (Rathbun, 1902)
- Eualus bulychevae Kobjakova, 1955
- Eualus butleri Jensen, 2004
- Eualus cranchii (Leach, 1817)
- Eualus cteniferus (Barnard, 1950)
- Eualus ctenomerus Komai & Fujiwara, 2012
- Eualus dozei (A. Milne-Edwards, 1891)
- Eualus drachi Noël, 1978
- Eualus fabricii (Krøyer, 1841)
- Eualus gaimardii (H. Milne Edwards, 1837)
- Eualus gracilipes Crosnier & Forest, 1973
- Eualus gracilirostris (Stimpson, 1860)
- Eualus heterodactylus Xu & Li, 2014
- Eualus horii Komai & Hayashi, 2002
- Eualus kikuchii Miyake & Hayashi, 1967
- Eualus kinzeri Tiefenbacher, 1990
- Eualus kuratai Miyake & Hayashi, 1967
- Eualus lebourae Holthuis, 1951
- Eualus leptognathus (Stimpson, 1860)
- Eualus lindbergi Kobjakova, 1955
- Eualus lineatus Wicksten & Butler, 1983
- Eualus macilentus (Krøyer, 1841)
- Eualus macrophthalmus (Rathbun, 1902)
- Eualus middendorffi Bražnikov, 1907
- Eualus occultus (Lebour, 1936)
- Eualus oreios Nye, 2013
- Eualus pax (Stebbing, 1915)
- Eualus pectiniformis Hanamura, 2008
- Eualus pusiolus (Krøyer, 1841)
- Eualus sinensis (Yu, 1931)
- Eualus sollaudi (Zariquiey Cenarro, 1936)
- Eualus spathulirostris (Yokoya, 1933)
- Eualus subtilis Carvacho & Olson, 1984
- Eualus suckleyi (Stimpson, 1864)
- Eualus townsendi (Rathbun, 1902)
- Eualus zarenkovi Komai & De Grave, 2015
