= Agustín Caffaro =

Argentine basketball player (born 1995)

No. 11 – Regatas Corrientes
- Position: Center
- League: Liga Nacional de Básquet

Personal information
- Born: 6 February 1995 (age 31) Santa Fe, Argentina
- Listed height: 6 ft 11 in (2.11 m)
- Listed weight: 222 lb (101 kg)

Career information
- NBA draft: 2017: undrafted
- Playing career: 2008–present

Career history
- 2015–2016: Quimsa
- 2016: Huracán
- 2016–2018: Boca Juniors
- 2018–2019: Libertad Sunchales
- 2019–2022: San Lorenzo de Almagro
- 2022–2023: Peñarol Mar del Plata
- 2023-present: Regatas Corrientes
Medals
Men's basketball
Representing Argentina
World Cup
Silver medal – second place	2019 China
Pan American Games
Gold medal – first place	2019 Lima

Agustín Caffaro (born 6 February 1995) is an Argentine basketball player who plays as a center for Argentina and Regatas Corrientes of the Liga Nacional de Básquet (LNB). He was named in Argentine squad for the 2019 FIBA Basketball World Cup.

== National team career ==
Agustín made his senior international debut for Argentina at the 2019 FIBA Basketball World Cup Qualifiers against Puerto Rico on 22 February 2019. He was also a key member of the Argentine team which claimed gold medal at the 2019 Pan American Games for the first time since 1995. Agustín clinched silver medal with Argentina which emerged as runners-up to Spain at the 2019 FIBA Basketball World Cup.
