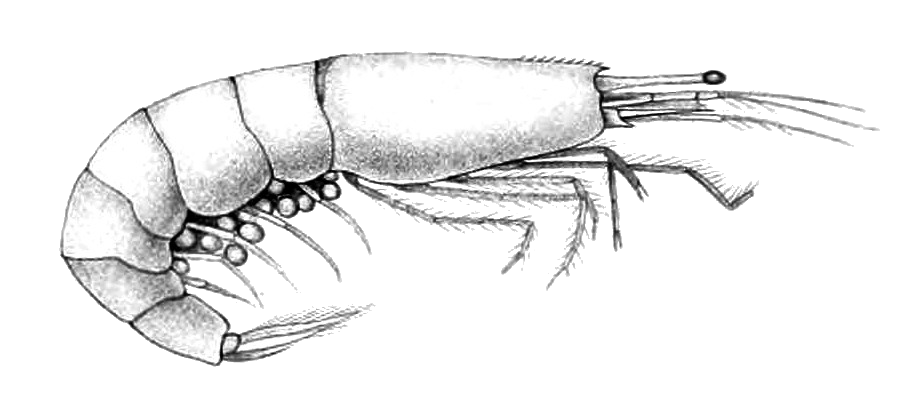
- Ogyrides alphaerostris

Scientific classification
- Kingdom: Animalia
- Phylum: Arthropoda
- Clade: Pancrustacea
- Class: Malacostraca
- Order: Decapoda
- Suborder: Pleocyemata
- Infraorder: Caridea
- Superfamily: Alpheoidea
- Family: Ogyrididae; Holthuis, 1955
- Genus: Ogyrides; Stebbing, 1914

Type species
- Ogyris orientalis Stimpson, 1860

Synonyms
- Ogyris Stimpson, 1860

= Ogyrides =

Genus of crustaceans

Ogyrides, also known as long eyed shrimps, is a genus of decapod crustaceans consisting of 13 species. It is the only genus in the monotypic family Ogyrididae.

== Appearance ==
Eyes are elongate, reaching nearly to distal end of antennular peduncle. Their first pair of pereiopods is robust and similar in size to the second pair; distinctly chelate. The second pair of pereiopods is divided into four articles. The first maxilliped has an exopod far removed from the endite. But the second maxilliped has segments arranged in usual serial manner; bearing exopod; endopod 4-segmented. Mandible usually with incisor and molar processes and palp. Second maxilla with palp; endite well developed.

== Diet ==
During early years the majority of their diet is composed of sea plankton, sea plants and sea weed. A grown long-eyed shrimp would eat small worms and microscopic organisms. From time to time they might consume dead fish or crabs and occasionally they would turn and eat their own.

== Habitat ==
This genus contains 13 species distributed along tropical and subtropical coasts around the world. Most of the species in this genus have been found off Australia and Mexico coasts. In these areas the shrimps have the optimal conditions and temperature to survive. One species Ogyrides mjoebergi has colonised the eastern Mediterranean from the Red Sea via the Suez Canal, a process known as Lessepsian migration.

== Behaviour ==
These shrimps exhibit complex behaviors like eusociality. Newly molted individuals have displayed a shift of their entire body forwards, with the cephalothorax angled downwards with respect to the pleon and both chelipeds extended forwards and towards each other; body jerked rapidly backwards with pleon curled and walking pereiopods extended; cephalothorax angled upwards, while the chelipeds were spread apart and moved backwards; and continuous undulations of pleopods. Is important to note that this only happened in individuals that were in their burrows and in the presence of light.

== Taxonomy ==
The genus name Ogyrides was proposed by the English zoologist Thomas Roscoe Rede Stebbing in 1914 as a replacement name, the genus had originally been named Ogyris in 1860 by William Stimpson, with Ogyris orientalis as its type species, but this name was invalid as it was preoccupied by a genus in Lepidoptera, Ogyris, proposed by George French Angas in 1847. The genus Ogyrides is the only genus in the monotypic family Ogyrididae, proposed by Lipke Holthuis in 1955,.

The following species are currently recognised:

- Ogyrides alphaerostris (Kingsley, 1880) – estuarine longeye shrimp
- Ogyrides delli Yaldwyn, 1971
- Ogyrides hayi Williams, 1981 – sand longeye shrimp
- Ogyrides mjoebergi (Balss, 1921)
- Ogyrides occidentalis (Ortmann, 1893) – telescope shrimp
- Ogyrides orientalis (Stimpson, 1860)
- Ogyrides rarispina Holthuis, 1951
- Ogyrides saldanhae Barnard, 1947
- Ogyrides sibogae de Man, 1910
- Ogyrides sindibadi De Grave, Al-Kandari & Anker, 2020
- Ogyrides striaticauda Kemp, 1915
- Ogyrides tarazonai Wicksten & Méndez G., 1988
- Ogyrides wickstenae Ayón-Parente & Salgado-Barragán, 2013
