= Spirontocaris =

- Spirontocaris lamellicornis

Scientific classification
- Kingdom: Animalia
- Phylum: Arthropoda
- Clade: Pancrustacea
- Class: Malacostraca
- Order: Decapoda
- Suborder: Pleocyemata
- Infraorder: Caridea
- Family: Thoridae
- Genus: Spirontocaris; Spence Bate, 1888

Genus of shrimp

Spirontocaris is a genus of benthic (bottom-dwelling) shrimp in the family Thoridae first described by Charles Spence Bate in 1888. They are known in part for their distinctive, thorny rostrums.

- Spirontocaris affinis Owen, 1866
- Spirontocaris arcuata Rathbun, 1902
- Spirontocaris dalli Rathbun, 1902
- Spirontocaris gurjanovae Kobjakova, 1955
- Spirontocaris holmesi Holthuis, 1947
- Spirontocaris lamellicornis (Dana, 1852)
- Spirontocaris lilljeborgi (Danielssen, 1859)
- Spirontocaris murdochi Rathbun, 1902
- Spirontocaris ochotensis (Brandt, 1851)
- Spirontocaris phippsi (Krøyer, 1841)
- Spirontocaris prionota (Stimpson, 1864)
- Spirontocaris sica Rathbun, 1902
- Spirontocaris snyderi Rathbun, 1902
- Spirontocaris spinus (J.Sowerby, 1805)
