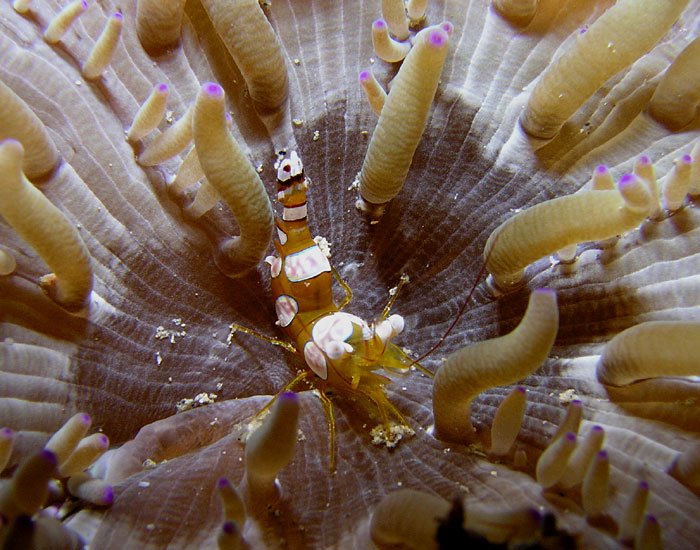
- Thor amboinensis

Scientific classification
- Domain: Eukaryota
- Kingdom: Animalia
- Phylum: Arthropoda
- Class: Malacostraca
- Order: Decapoda
- Suborder: Pleocyemata
- Infraorder: Caridea
- Family: Thoridae
- Genus: Thor; Kingsley, 1878

= Thor (crustacean) =

Genus of crustaceans

Thor is a genus of shrimp in the family Thoridae, containing the following species:

- Thor algicola Wicksten, 1987
- Thor amboinensis (De Man, 1888)
- Thor cocoensis Wicksten & Vargas, 2001
- Thor cordelli Wicksten, 1996
- Thor dobkini Chace, 1972
- Thor floridanus Kingsley, 1878
- Thor intermedius Holthuis, 1947
- Thor manningi Chace, 1972
- Thor marguitae Bruce, 1978
- Thor paschalis (Heller, 1862)
- Thor spinipes Bruce, 1983
- Thor spinosus Boone, 1935
