= Birulia kishinouyei =

Scientific classification
- Domain: Eukaryota
- Kingdom: Animalia
- Phylum: Arthropoda
- Class: Malacostraca
- Order: Decapoda
- Suborder: Pleocyemata
- Infraorder: Caridea
- Family: Thoridae
- Genus: Birulia
- Species: B. kishinouyei

Binomial name
- Birulia kishinouyei (Yokoya, 1930)

Synonyms
- Paraspirontocaris kishinouyei Yokoya, 1930

Species of crustacean

Birulia kishinouyei is a shrimp species in the genus Birulia. Its specific epithet is a tribute to the Japanese fisheries biologist Kamakichi Kishinouye (岸上 鎌吉, 1867–1929).
