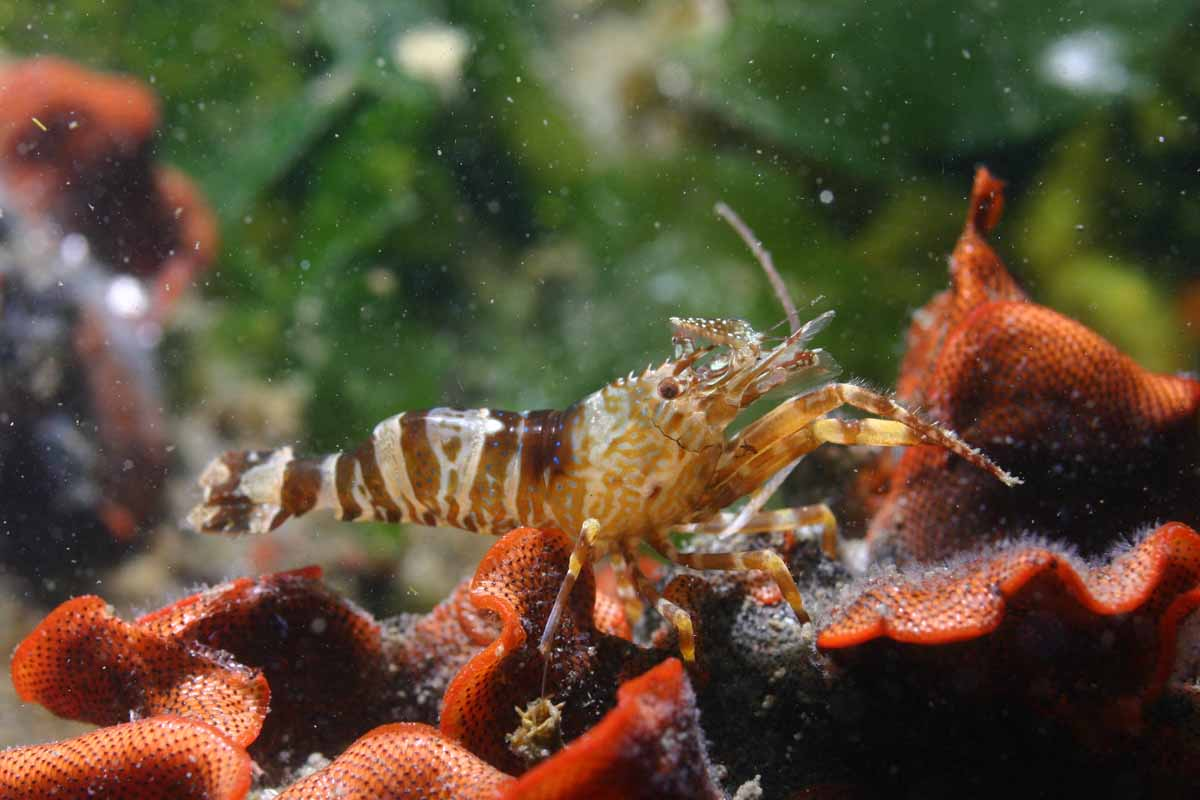
- Intertidal coastal shrimp, Heptacarpus palpator

Scientific classification
- Kingdom: Animalia
- Phylum: Arthropoda
- Class: Malacostraca
- Order: Decapoda
- Suborder: Pleocyemata
- Infraorder: Caridea
- Family: Thoridae
- Genus: Heptacarpus; Holmes, 1900

= Heptacarpus =

Genus of crustaceans

Heptacarpus is a genus of shrimps in the family Thoridae. There are more than 30 described species in the genus Heptacarpus. Most species are found in shallow water.

== Species ==
The following species are recognised in the genus Heptacarpus:

- Heptacarpus acuticarinatus Komai & Ivanov, 2008
- Heptacarpus brachydactylus (M.J.Rathbun, 1902) (island coastal shrimp)
- Heptacarpus brevirostris (Dana, 1852) (stout coastal shrimp)
- Heptacarpus camtschaticus (Stimpson, 1860) (northern coastal shrimp)
- Heptacarpus carinatus Holmes, 1900 (smalleye coastal shrimp)
- Heptacarpus commensalis Hayashi, 1979
- Heptacarpus decorus (M.J.Rathbun, 1902) (elegant coastal shrimp)
- Heptacarpus flexus (M.J.Rathbun, 1902) (slenderbeak coastal shrimp)
- Heptacarpus franciscanus (Schmitt, 1921) (Franciscan coastal shrimp)
- Heptacarpus fuscimaculatus Wicksten, 1986
- Heptacarpus futilirostris (Bate, 1888) (toy shrimp)
- Heptacarpus geniculatus (Stimpson, 1860) (flexed shrimp)
- Heptacarpus grebnitzkii (Rathbun, 1902)
- Heptacarpus herdmani (herdman coastal shrimp)
- Heptacarpus igarashii Hayashi & Chiba, 1989
- Heptacarpus jordani (Rathbun, 1902)
- Heptacarpus kincaidi (M.J.Rathbun, 1902) (Kincaid coastal shrimp)
- Heptacarpus longirostris (Kobyakova, 1936)
- Heptacarpus maxillipes (M.J.Rathbun, 1902) (Aleutian coastal shrimp)
- Heptacarpus minutus (Yokoya, 1930)
- Heptacarpus moseri (M.J.Rathbun, 1902) (alaska coastal shrimp)
- Heptacarpus palpator (Owen, 1839) (intertidal coastal shrimp)
- Heptacarpus paludicola Holmes, 1900 (California coastal shrimp)
- Heptacarpus pandaloides (Stimpson, 1860) (tsuno shrimp)
- Heptacarpus pugettensis Jensen, 1983 (barred shrimp)
- Heptacarpus rectirostris (Stimpson, 1860)
- Heptacarpus sitchensis (Brandt, 1851) (red-banded transparent shrimp)
- Heptacarpus stimpsoni Holthuis, 1947 (stimpson coastal shrimp)
- Heptacarpus stylus (Stimpson, 1864) (stiletto coastal shrimp)
- Heptacarpus taylori (Stimpson, 1857) (taylor coastal shrimp)
- Heptacarpus tenuissimus Holmes, 1900 (slender coastal shrimp)
- Heptacarpus tridens (M.J.Rathbun, 1902) (threespine coastal shrimp)
- Heptacarpus yaldwyni Wicksten, 1984
