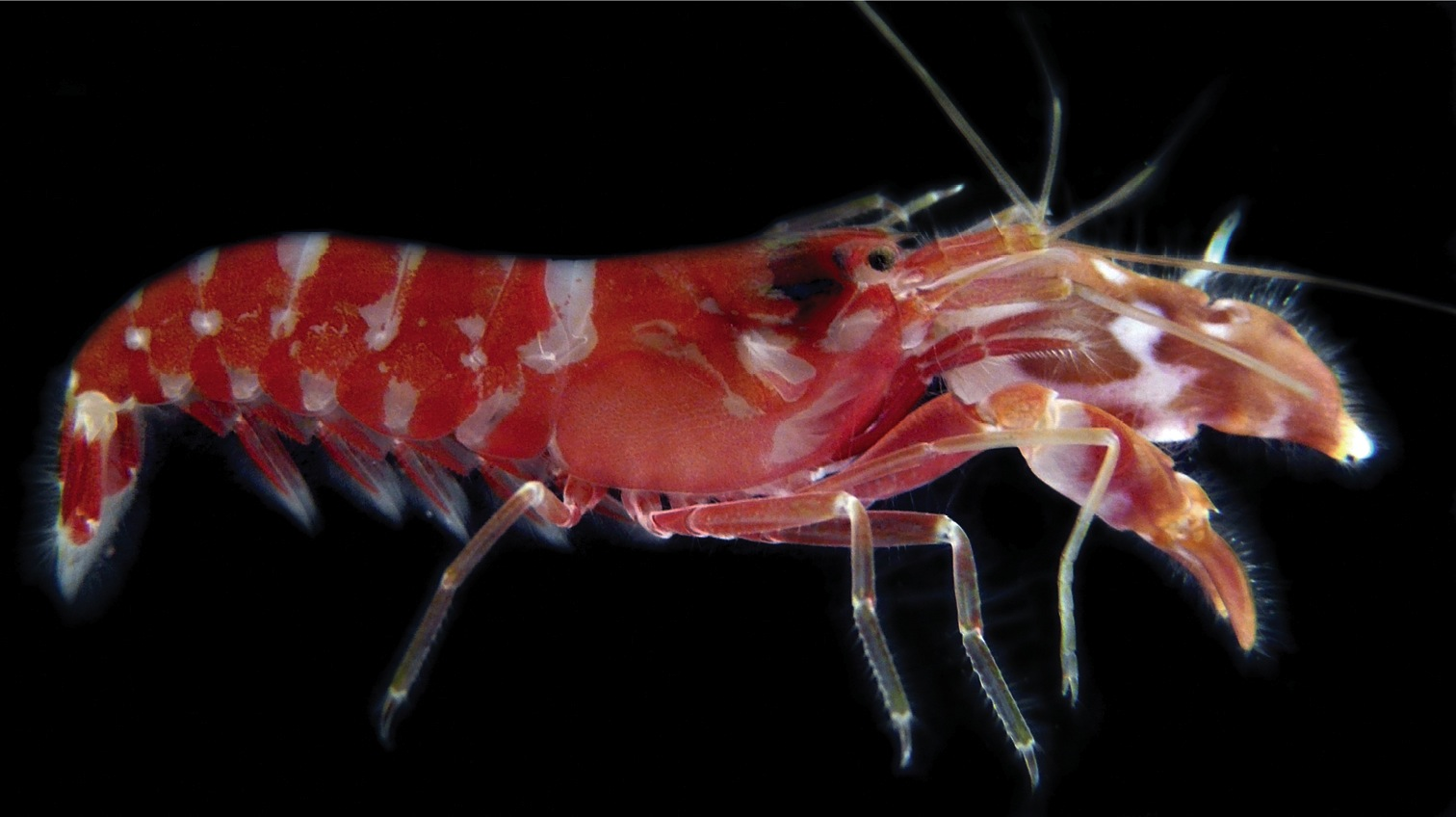
- Alpheus cedrici

Scientific classification
- Kingdom: Animalia
- Phylum: Arthropoda
- Class: Malacostraca
- Order: Decapoda
- Suborder: Pleocyemata
- Infraorder: Caridea
- Superfamily: Alpheoidea; Rafinesque, 1815

= Alpheoidea =

Superfamily of crustaceans

Alpheoidea is a superfamily of shrimp. Species of shrimp in the superfamily Alpheoidea are drag swimmers, as opposed to lift swimmers.

== Taxonomy ==
The following families are recognised in the superfamily Alpheoidea:

- Alpheidae Rafinesque, 1815
- Barbouriidae Christoffersen, 1987
- Bythocarididae Christoffersen, 1987
- Hippolytidae Bate, 1888
- Lysmatidae Dana, 1852
- Merguiidae Christoffersen, 1990
- Ogyrididae Holthuis, 1955
- Thoridae Kingsley, 1878
