= Momar Ndoye (basketball) =

Senegalese basketball player (born 1995)

Momar Nduoye
Tours Métropole Basket
- Position: Shooting guard
- League: Nationale Masculine 1

Personal information
- Born: July 13, 1995 (age 31) Rufisque, Senegal
- Listed height: 6 ft 7 in (2.01 m)
- Listed weight: 190 lb (86 kg)

Career information
- NBA draft: 2017: undrafted
- Playing career: 2016–present

Career history
- 2016–2018: Andrézieux-Bouthéon LSB
- 2018–2019: EF Feurs
- 2019–2020: JA Vichy-Clermont
- 2020–2021: SO Pont-de-Chéruy
- 2021–2022: FC Mulhouse Basket
- 2022–present: Tours Métropole Basket

Momar Nduoye (born 13 July 1995) is a Senegalese basketball player for Tours Métropole Basket of the Nationale Masculine 1. He plays for the Senegal national basketball team.

== Professional career ==
Ndoye started playing professionally in 2016, he had previously played for the Under 21 side of the Chorale Roanne Basket and BCM Gravelines-Dunkerque. He started playing with Andrézieux-Bouthéon LSB in the 2016–17 season, where he averaged 1.2 points, 1.6 rebound and 0.3 assists per game. In the 2017–18 season, he averaged 5.1 points, 3.6 rebound and 1.2 assists per game. On the July 9, 2018, he moved to Feurs Enfants du Forez Basket, he averaged 8.6 points, 4.6 rebound and 0.7 assist per game. In the 2019–20 season, he moved to the JA Vichy-Clermont Métropole Basket. Ndoye averaged 2.0 points and 1.8 rebounds per game in LNB Pro B. On September 3, 2020, he signed with SO Pont de Cheruy Charvieu Chavanoz of the Nationale Masculine 1.

== National team career ==
Nomar Nduoye represented the Senegal national basketball team at the 2019 FIBA Basketball World Cup in China, where he averaged 0.2 points, 1.2 rebound and 0.2 assists per game.
