= Luc Longley =

Australian basketball player (born 1969)

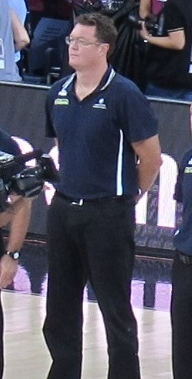

Personal information
- Born: 19 January 1969 (age 57) Melbourne, Victoria, Australia
- Listed height: 7 ft 2 in (2.18 m)
- Listed weight: 265 lb (120 kg)

Career information
- High school: Scotch College (Perth, Western Australia)
- College: New Mexico (1987–1991)
- NBA draft: 1991: 1st round, 7th overall pick
- Drafted by: Minnesota Timberwolves
- Playing career: 1986–2001
- Position: Center
- Number: 13
- Coaching career: 2013–present

Career history
- 1986: Perth Wildcats
- 1987–1990: Perth Redbacks
- 1991–1994: Minnesota Timberwolves
- 1994–1998: Chicago Bulls
- 1999–2000: Phoenix Suns
- 2000–2001: New York Knicks

Career highlights
- 3× NBA champion (1996–1998); 2× Australian State League champion (1989, 1990); Gaze Medal winner (1989); 2× First-team All-WAC (1990, 1991)

Career NBA statistics
- Points: 4,090 (7.2 ppg)
- Rebounds: 2,794 (4.9 rpg)
- Blocks: 549 (1.0 bpg)
- Stats at NBA.com
- Stats at Basketball Reference

Lucien James Longley (born 19 January 1969) is an Australian professional basketball coach and former player. He was the first Australian to play in the National Basketball Association (NBA), where he played for four teams over 10 seasons. He most notably played for the Chicago Bulls, with whom he won three championships from 1996 to 1998. Longley represented Australia as a player at three Olympic Games in 1988, 1992 and 2000; he has worked as an assistant coach for the Australian national basketball team.

Longley began his career in Australia with a brief stint playing for the Perth Wildcats of the National Basketball League (NBL) in 1986. He played collegiately for the New Mexico Lobos and was drafted 7th overall by the Minnesota Timberwolves in the 1991 NBA draft. He played three seasons with the Timberwolves before he was traded to the Bulls in 1994. He became the Bulls' starting centre during their historic 1995–96 season when they set the NBA record for most wins in a regular season with 72. Longley was an important component of the team's success and stayed in the Bulls' starting lineup during their championship three-peat. After the demise of the Bulls after their 1998 championship win, he had brief stints playing with the Phoenix Suns and New York Knicks.

== Early life and career ==
Longley was born 19 January 1969 in Melbourne, Victoria, to Sue (née Hansen) and Richard Longley. Longley's father was an architect who stood 6 ft 10 in (2.08 m) tall and represented Australia at international level in basketball, including being a member of two Olympic squads. His mother, who is 6 ft 4 in (1.93 m) tall, is an equestrian who has been divorced from Richard since 1984 and lives in Albuquerque, New Mexico, United States. Longley has two brothers, Sam, a journalist and actor, and Griffin, also a journalist who also played briefly for the Perth Wildcats.

Longley grew up in Fremantle, Western Australia. At the age of 16 he was a member of the Australian Under-19 side and the following year, 1986, he joined the Wildcats, with whom he played two games.

Longley was recruited out of Scotch College in Perth by the University of New Mexico's basketball coach, Gary Colson, who went to Perth to recruit Longley's childhood friend Andrew Vlahov, who ended up attending Stanford University. Vlahov and Longley both played their junior basketball for the Perth Redbacks on the same team. Longley attended college at the University of New Mexico, from 1987 to 1991, where he averaged 19.1 points, 9.2 rebounds and 3.6 assists in his senior year. He helped New Mexico reach the NCAA Tournament in 1991. At nineteen he was a member of the national team for the Seoul Olympics, where they finished fourth, at the time the best result an Australian senior men's basketball team had achieved in Olympic competition.

Longley also spent time at the Australian Institute of Sport in 1986 and 1987 (before heading to New Mexico) under the coaching of Australian Boomers head coach Adrian Hurley, attending the AIS with Vlahov and another emerging basketball player from Adelaide, Mark Bradtke. Throughout the 1990s, the trio formed the nucleus of the Australian Boomers front court with Longley at centre, 6'10" (208 cm) Bradtke at power forward, and 6'7" (201 cm) Vlahov at small forward.

When Longley returned home to Perth during college breaks, he regularly suited up for the Perth Redbacks, helping the team to win consecutive State Basketball League (SBL) championships in 1989 and 1990.

== NBA career ==
=== Minnesota Timberwolves ===
Longley was drafted 7th overall by the Minnesota Timberwolves in 1991. After long contract negotiations that were still going on when the 1991–92 NBA season started and actually prevented him from playing for the first month, he made his NBA debut for the Timberwolves on 30 November 1991. In 1992, he again represented Australia at the Barcelona Olympics. After two-plus seasons with the struggling franchise, the 7 ft 2 in (2.18 m) center was traded to the Chicago Bulls for Stacey King late in the 1993–94 season.

=== Chicago Bulls ===
Longley became the Bulls' starting center. He won three straight championships with the Bulls from 1996 to 1998, becoming the first Australian player to win an NBA title and the only to have won three championships. After he played 55 games from the bench in 1994–95, Chicago Bulls coach Phil Jackson made him the starting center in 1995–96. Post-season surgery to his left ankle and the recovery time forced him to miss playing for the Australian Boomers at the 1996 Olympics in Atlanta.

Longley missed almost two months of the 1996–97 season after dislocating his shoulder while body surfing at Hermosa Beach near the team's hotel after a game in Los Angeles. In a 2014 interview on Australian television, Longley stated that during that period, Michael Jordan began calling him to urge him to get back on the court soon because he had no one to set screens for him.

=== Phoenix Suns ===
After the breakup of the Bulls roster after the 1997–98 season, Chicago did a sign-and-trade deal with Longley, sending him to the Phoenix Suns for Mark Bryant, Martin Müürsepp, Bubba Wells, and a conditional first-round draft pick.

=== New York Knicks ===
Longley was traded to the New York Knicks prior to the 2000–01 NBA season in what was only the second four-team trade in NBA history. The Suns acquired Chris Dudley as part of the deal together with a first-round draft pick from New York and an undisclosed amount of cash, while New York received Longley, Glen Rice, Travis Knight, Vladimir Stepania, Lazaro Borrell, Vernon Maxwell, two first-round draft picks (from the Los Angeles Lakers and the Seattle SuperSonics), and two second-round draft picks from Seattle. Seattle received Patrick Ewing and the Lakers received Horace Grant, Greg Foster, Chuck Person, and Emanual Davis. Longley played one year with New York before retiring, due to a degenerative condition in his left ankle.

== National team career ==
Luc Longley made his international debut for the Australia national basketball team in 1988 and would be, whenever possible, the preferred starting centre for the next 12 years. He appeared in three Summer Olympic Games (1988, 1992 and 2000) as well as at the 1990 FIBA World Championship. Unfortunately, injury prevented him from playing for Australia at the 1996 Olympic games as well as the 1994 and 1998 FIBA World Championships.

During his international career, Longley played alongside a number of the greats of Australian basketball including Andrew Gaze, Phil Smyth, Mark Bradtke, Andrew Vlahov, Ray Borner, Brett Maher, and Larry Sengstock.

== Awards ==
In 2001, Longley was inducted into the Australian Institute of Sport 'Best of the Best'. He was the #1 ticket holder at the Fremantle Dockers in the Australian Football League between 2006 and 2007. In 2006 he was inducted into Basketball Australia's Hall of Fame in Melbourne.

On 8 October 2009 Longley was inducted into the Sport Australia Hall of Fame at its 25th anniversary dinner in Melbourne, becoming only the fourth basketball player to be inducted along with Andrew Gaze, Michele Timms, and Phil Smyth.

In August 2021, Longley was inducted into the Basketball Western Australia Hall of Fame.

== Coaching career ==
Longley has spoken of the importance of the Australian Boomers to his growth as a player, citing it as the reason he wanted to return to the national program as an assistant coach; he would later become the assistant coach of the Australian men's national basketball team from 2013 to 2019.

== Executive career ==
In 1999, Longley became a part-owner of the Perth Wildcats basketball club in the Australian National Basketball League (NBL) alongside Andrew Vlahov. He donated his 75% equity to Vlahov in 2004.

In 2019, Longley joined the Sydney Kings of the NBL as a special advisor. In 2022, he became a member of the ownership group for Hoops Capital Pty Ltd which owns the Kings and the Sydney Flames of the Women's National Basketball League.

== Personal life ==
Longley was married to an American, Kelly Yates, whom he met while he was attending college in Albuquerque and they have two daughters. He married an Australian, Anna Gare, a former musician and current television presenter, in 2008. The Longley family are well known in the Fremantle, Western Australia area, to the extent that a 25-year-old, then Chicago Bulls player, Longley was present at the Fremantle Football Club's unveiling and launch at the Fremantle Port. He cited Fremantle at the time as "one of the world's great spots".

In 1996, Longley bought a house in Riverwoods, Illinois. Also in 1996, he wrote a book, Running with the Bulls, about the 1995–96 season; Bulls coach Phil Jackson wrote the foreword.

On 6 April 2007, Longley's $2 million home in Fremantle was destroyed by a fire. It was initially believed that much of Longley's memorabilia from his basketball career was lost, although he later said he only lost his 1996 team photo. He then bought a warehouse on a nearby street which Gare's father, an architect, converted into a house for their needs. In 2015, the couple moved to a property near the coastal Western Australian town of Denmark.

In December 2009 Longley, who had previously participated in marine conservation efforts, named a newly discovered shrimp species Lebbeus clarehannah after his 15-year-old daughter. His wife's sister Sophie is married to British comedian Ben Elton.
