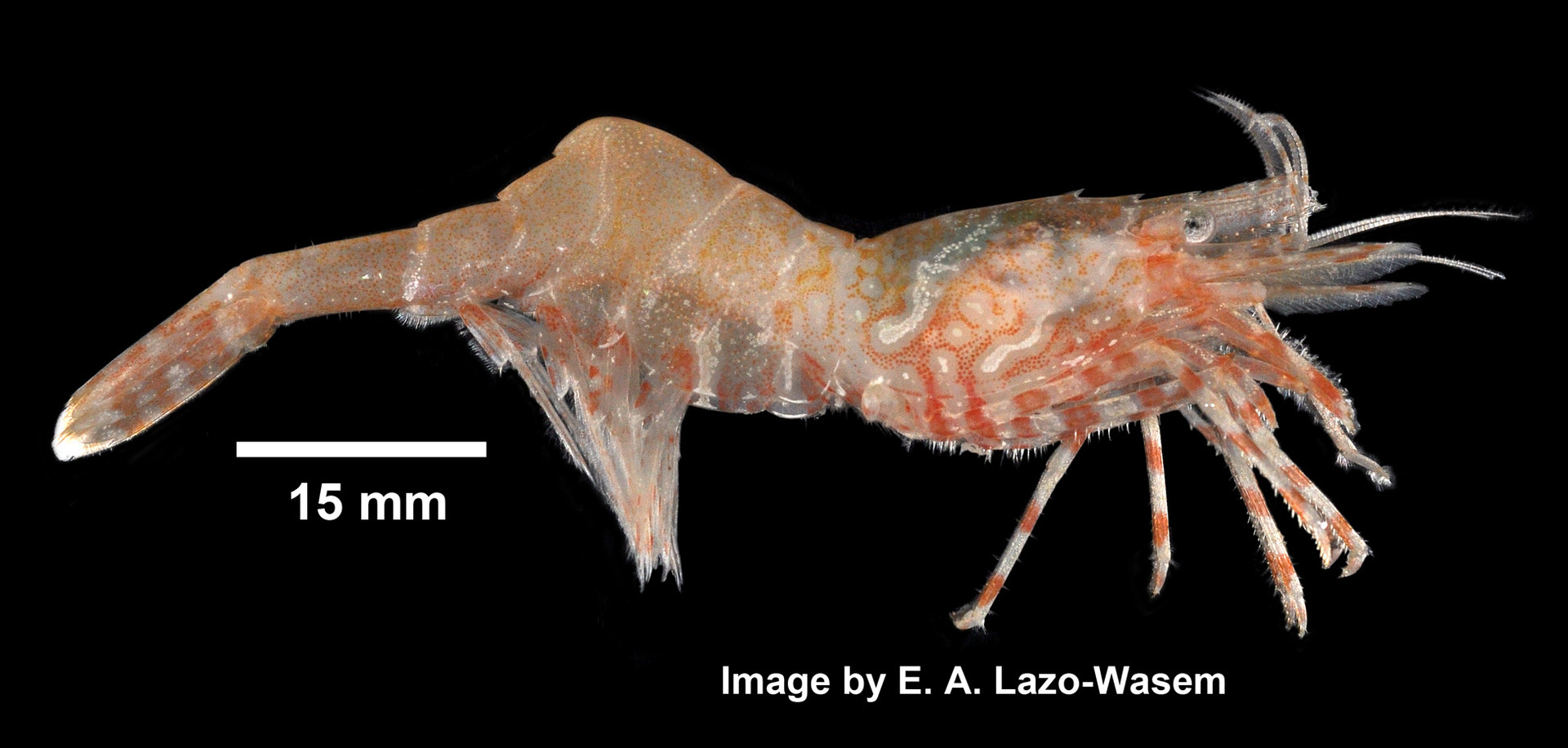
- Eualus sp.

Scientific classification
- Kingdom: Animalia
- Phylum: Arthropoda
- Clade: Pancrustacea
- Class: Malacostraca
- Order: Decapoda
- Suborder: Pleocyemata
- Infraorder: Caridea
- Superfamily: Alpheoidea
- Family: Thoridae; Kingsley, 1878

Genera
- See text.

= Thoridae =

Family of crustaceans

Thoridae, also known as broken-back shrimp or anemone shrimp, is a family of cleaner shrimp.

== Genera ==
The following genera are recognised in the family Thoridae:

- Birulia Bražnikov, 1903
- Eualus Thallwitz, 1892
- Heptacarpus Holmes, 1900
- Latreutes Stimpson, 1860
- Lebbeus White, 1847
- Paralebbeus Bruce & Chace, 1986
- Spirontocaris Bate, 1888
- Thinora Bruce, 1998
- Thor Kingsley, 1878

Morphological and genetic studies show that Thoridae is distinct from Hippolytidae.
